= 2021–22 Bangladesh Premier League =

Cricket Tournament

Bangladesh Premier League 2022
- 2022 BPL Logo
- Dates: 21 January – 18 February 2022
- Administrator: Bangladesh Cricket Board
- Cricket format: Twenty20
- Tournament format(s): Double round-robin and playoffs
- Host: Bangladesh
- Champions: Comilla Victorians (3rd title)
- Runners-up: Fortune Barishal
- Participants: 6
- Matches: 34
- Player of the series: Shakib Al Hasan (Fortune Barishal)
- Most runs: Will Jacks (Chattogram Challengers) (414)
- Most wickets: Mustafizur Rahman (Comilla Victorians) (19)
- Official website: BPL

The Bangladesh Premier League 2022, also known as BPL Season 8 or Bangabandhu BPL 2022 (for sponsorship reasons), was the eighth season of the Bangladesh Premier League (BPL), the top-level professional Twenty20 cricket league in Bangladesh, organized by the Bangladesh Cricket Board (BCB). The season was scheduled to start from March 2021. However, the tournament was postponed and rescheduled to be held from 21 January to 18 February 2022.

A franchise from Barisal was announced as taking part since Barisal Bulls played in 2016–17 Bangladesh Premier League. Comilla Victorians returned after a hiatus of one season. On 12 December 2021, all six teams were announced, with the exclusion of Rangpur Rangers and the defending champion Rajshahi Royals.

In the final match, Comilla Victorians defeated Fortune Barishal by 1 run to win their third BPL title. Comilla Victorians' bowling allrounder Sunil Narine won Player of the match for his all-round performances and Fortune Barishal captain Shakib Al Hasan won Player of the Tournament award for his all-round performances. Will Jacks was the leading run scorer in the tournament with 414 runs while Mustafizur Rahman was the leading wicket-taker with 19 wickets.

== Changes of rules ==
After confirming all franchises, BCB changed the rule of playing condition as:

- Each team is allowed to play a maximum of three overseas players in a match.
- Each franchise is allowed to sign one local players from any category as direct signing prior to the players' draft, and a maximum of 3 foreign players can be recruited as direct signing.
- Each franchise is allowed to sign a minimum of 10 and a maximum of 14 local players while a minimum of 3 and a maximum of 8 can be signed, in the case of foreign players.

== Draft and squads ==
The players' draft was held on 27 December 2021.

Chattogram Challengers Coach: Shaun Tait	Comilla Victorians Coach: Mohammad Salahuddin	Fortune Barishal Coach: Khaled Mahmud	Khulna Tigers Coach: Lance Klusener	Minister Dhaka Coach: Mizanur Rahman	Sylhet Sunrisers Coach: Mervyn Dillon
(Bangladesh) Afif Hossain (c); (Bangladesh) Naeem Islam; (Bangladesh) Mehidy Hasan; (Bangladesh) Nasum Ahmed; (England) Benny Howell; (Cricket West Indies) Kennar Lewis; (England) Will Jacks; (Bangladesh) Shoriful Islam; (Bangladesh) Shamim Hossain; (Bangladesh) Mukidul Islam; (Cricket West Indies) Chadwick Walton; (Cricket West Indies) Rayad Emrit; (Bangladesh) Rejaur Rahman Raja; (Bangladesh) Sabbir Rahman; (Bangladesh) Mrittunjoy Chowdhury; (Bangladesh) Akbar Ali; (Bangladesh) Enamul Haque; (Bangladesh) Zakir Hasan	(Bangladesh) Imrul Kayes (c); (South Africa) Faf du Plessis; (England) Moeen Ali; (Cricket West Indies) Sunil Narine; (Bangladesh) Mustafizur Rahman; (Bangladesh) Litton Das; (Bangladesh) Shohidul Islam; (Bangladesh) Tanvir Islam; (Sri Lanka) Kusal Mendis; (Cricket West Indies) Oshane Thomas; (Bangladesh) Ariful Haque; (Bangladesh) Nahidul Islam; (Bangladesh) Mahmudul Hasan Joy; (Bangladesh) Sumon Khan; (Bangladesh) Mominul Haque; (Bangladesh) Mahidul Islam Ankon; (Bangladesh) Pervez Hossain Emon; (Bangladesh) Abu Hider; Mehedi Hasan; (South Africa) Cameron Delport; (Afghanistan) Karim Janat	(Bangladesh) Shakib Al Hasan (c); (Afghanistan) Mujeeb Ur Rahman; (Sri Lanka) Danushka Gunathilaka; (Cricket West Indies) Chris Gayle; (Bangladesh) Nurul Hasan; (Bangladesh) Najmul Hossain Shanto; (Bangladesh) Mehedi Hasan Rana; (Bangladesh) Fazle Mahmud; (Cricket West Indies) Obed McCoy; (Cricket West Indies) Alzarri Joseph; (Bangladesh) Towhid Hridoy; (Bangladesh) Ziaur Rahman; (Bangladesh) Shafiqul Islam; (Bangladesh) Shykat Ali; (Sri Lanka) Niroshan Dickwella; (Bangladesh) Nayeem Hasan; (Bangladesh) Taijul Islam; (Bangladesh) Salman Hossain; (Bangladesh) Irfan Sukkur; (Cricket West Indies) Dwayne Bravo; (Bangladesh) Munim Shahriar; (England) Jake Lintott; (England) Sam Hain	(Bangladesh) Mushfiqur Rahim (c); (Sri Lanka) Thisara Perera; (Sri Lanka) Bhanuka Rajapaksa; (Afghanistan) Naveen-ul-Haq; (Bangladesh) Mahedi Hasan; (Bangladesh) Soumya Sarkar; (Bangladesh) Kamrul Islam Rabbi; (Bangladesh) Yasir Ali; (Sri Lanka) Seekkuge Prasanna; (Zimbabwe) Sikandar Raza; (Bangladesh) Farhad Reza; (Bangladesh) Rony Talukdar; (Bangladesh) Khaled Ahmed; (Bangladesh) Jaker Ali; (Bangladesh) Nabil Samad; (Bangladesh) Suhrawadi Shuvo; (Bangladesh) Sharifullah; (Cricket West Indies) Andre Fletcher; (Bangladesh) Tanzid Hasan; (Bangladesh) Ruyel Miah	(Bangladesh) Mahmudullah (c); (Sri Lanka) Isuru Udana; (Afghanistan) Qais Ahmad; (Afghanistan) Najibullah Zadran; (Bangladesh) Tamim Iqbal; (Bangladesh) Rubel Hossain; (Bangladesh) Mashrafe Mortaza; (Bangladesh) Shuvagata Hom; (Afghanistan) Mohammad Shahzad; (Afghanistan) Fazalhaq Farooqi; (Bangladesh) Mohammad Naim; (Bangladesh) Arafat Sunny; (Bangladesh) Imran Uzzaman; (Bangladesh) Shafiul Islam; (Bangladesh) Jahurul Islam; (Bangladesh) Shamsur Rahman; (Bangladesh) Ebadot Hossain; (Bangladesh) Rishad Hossain; (Cricket West Indies) Andre Russell; (Bangladesh) Hasan Murad; (Bangladesh) Aminul Islam; (Afghanistan) Azmatullah Omarzai	(England) Ravi Bopara (c); (Bangladesh) Mosaddek Hossain; (Bangladesh) Taskin Ahmed; (Sri Lanka) Dinesh Chandimal; (Cricket West Indies) Kesrick Williams; (South Africa) Colin Ingram; (United Arab Emirates) Shiraz Ahmed; (Bangladesh) Mohammad Mithun; (Bangladesh) Al-Amin Hossain; (Bangladesh) Nazmul Islam; (Sri Lanka) Angelo Perera; (Bangladesh) Anamul Haque; (Bangladesh) Sohag Gazi; (Bangladesh) Alok Kapali; (Bangladesh) Muktar Ali; (Bangladesh) Jubair Hossain; (Bangladesh) Mizanur Rahman; (Bangladesh) Nadif Chowdhury; Shafiul Hayet; (Bangladesh) Sunzamul Islam; (Cricket West Indies) Lendl Simmons; (Cricket West Indies) Devon Thomas; (Bangladesh) Alauddin Babu; (Bangladesh) AKS Swadhin

Sri Lanka Cricket did not provide a no-objection certificate to some of its players due to Future Tours Programme (FTP) commitments.

== Venues ==
Chittagong	Dhaka	Sylhet
Zohur Ahmed Chowdhury Stadium	Sher-e-Bangla National Cricket Stadium	Sylhet International Cricket Stadium
Capacity: 20,000	Capacity: 26,000	Capacity: 18,500
Matches: 8	Matches: 20 (incl. fs)	Matches: 6
Zahur Ahmed Chowdhury Stadium	Sher-e-Bangla National Cricket Stadium	Sylhet International Cricket Stadium
2021–22 Bangladesh Premier League is located in Bangladesh

== Teams and standings ==
=== Points Table ===
Pos	Team	Pld	W	L	NR	Pts	NRR
1	Fortune Barishal (R)	10	7	2	1	15	0.244
2	Comilla Victorians (C)	10	6	3	1	13	0.680
3	Chattogram Challengers (3)	10	5	5	0	10	−0.109
4	Khulna Tigers (4)	10	5	5	0	10	−0.127
5	Minister Dhaka	10	4	5	1	9	−0.003
6	Sylhet Sunrisers	10	1	8	1	3	−0.696

Source: Cricinfo
- advances to the Qualifier 1
- advances to the Eliminator

=== League progression ===
	League matches										Playoffs		
Team	1	2	3	4	5	6	7	8	9	10	Q1/E	Q2	F
Chattogram Challengers	0	2	4	4	6	6	6	6	8	10	W	L	
Comilla Victorians	2	4	6	6	8	9	9	11	13	13	L	W	W
Fortune Barishal	2	2	2	4	6	8	9	11	13	15	W		L
Khulna Tigers	2	2	4	4	4	6	8	8	8	10	L		
Minister Dhaka	0	0	2	2	4	6	7	7	9	9			
Sylhet Sunrisers	0	2	2	2	2	3	3	3	3	3			

Win	Loss	No result

Note: The total points at the end of each group match are listed.
Note: Click on the points (group matches) or W/L (Playoffs) to see the match summary.

== League stage ==
=== Phase 1 (Dhaka) ===
21 January 2022
13:30 (D/N)
Scorecard

Chattogram Challengers; 125/8 (20 overs)	v	Fortune Barishal; 126/6 (18.4 overs)
Benny Howell 41 (20); Alzarri Joseph 3/32 (4 overs)		Shykat Ali 39 (35); Mehidy Hasan 4/16 (4 overs)

Fortune Barishal won by 4 wickets
Sher-e-Bangla National Cricket Stadium, Dhaka
Umpires: Tanvir Ahmed (Ban) and Sharfuddoula (Ban)
Player of the match: Mehidy Hasan (Chattogram Challengers)

- Fortune Barishal won the toss and elected to field.

21 January 2022
18:30 (N)
Scorecard

Minister Dhaka; 183/6 (20 overs)	v	Khulna Tigers; 186/5 (19 overs)
Tamim Iqbal 50 (42); Kamrul Islam Rabbi 3/45 (4 overs)		Rony Talukdar 61 (42); Ebadot Hossain 2/27 (3 overs)

Khulna Tigers won by 5 wickets
Sher-e-Bangla National Cricket Stadium, Dhaka
Umpires: Morshed Ali Khan (Ban) and Masudur Rahman (Ban)
Player of the match: Rony Talukdar (Khulna Tigers)

- Khulna Tigers won the toss and elected to field.

22 January 2022
12:30
Scorecard

Sylhet Sunrisers; 96 (19.1 overs)	v	Comilla Victorians; 97/8 (18.4 overs)
Colin Ingram 20 (21); Shohidul Islam 2/15 (3.1 overs)		Karim Janat 18 (13); Nazmul Islam 3/17 (4 overs)

Comilla Victorians won by 2 wickets
Sher-e-Bangla National Cricket Stadium, Dhaka
Umpires: Morshed Ali Khan (Ban) and Masudur Rahman (Ban)
Player of the match: Nahidul Islam (Comilla Victorians)

- Comilla Victorians won the toss and elected to field.

22 January 2022
17:30 (N)
Scorecard

Chattogram Challengers; 161/8 (20 overs)	v	Minister Dhaka; 131 (19.5 overs)
Will Jacks 41 (24); Rubel Hossain 3/26 (4 overs)		Tamim Iqbal 52 (45); Shoriful Islam 4/34 (4 overs)

Chattogram Challengers won by 30 runs
Sher-e-Bangla National Cricket Stadium, Dhaka
Umpires: Tanvir Ahmed (Ban) and Sharfuddoula (Ban)
Player of the match: Nasum Ahmed (Chattogram Challengers)

- Minister Dhaka won the toss and elected to field

24 January 2022
12:30
Scorecard

Fortune Barishal; 129/8 (20 overs)	v	Minister Dhaka; 130/6 (17.3 overs)
Chris Gayle 36 (30); Andre Russell 2/27 (4 overs)		Mahmudullah 47 (47); Shafiqul Islam 2/20 ( 3 overs)

Minister Dhaka won by 4 wickets
Sher-e-Bangla National Cricket Stadium, Dhaka
Umpires: Tanvir Ahmed (Ban) and Masudur Rahman (Ban)
Player of the match: Mahmudullah (Minister Dhaka)

- Minister Dhaka won the toss and elected to field.
- Shakib Al Hasan (Fortune Barishal) took his 400th wicket in Twenty20 cricket.

24 January 2022
17:30 (N)
Scorecard

Chattogram Challengers; 190/7 (20 overs)	v	Khulna Tigers; 165/9 (20 overs)
Benny Howell 34* (20); Kamrul Islam Rabbi 2/35 (3 overs)		Yasir Ali 40 (26); Rejaur Rahman Raja 2/20 (4 overs)

Chattogram Challengers won by 25 runs
Sher-e-Bangla National Cricket Stadium, Dhaka
Umpires: Morshed Ali Khan (Ban) and Sharfuddoula (Ban)
Player of the match: Benny Howell (Chattogram Challengers)

- Khulna Tigers won the toss and elected to field.
- Andre Fletcher (Khulna Tigers) was replaced by Sikandar Raza during Khulna Tiger's innings, after suffering a concussion.

25 January 2022
12:30
Scorecard

Minister Dhaka; 100 (18.4 overs)	v	Sylhet Sunrisers; 101/3 (17 overs)
Mahmudullah 33 (26); Nazmul Islam 4/18 (4 overs)		Anamul Haque 45 (45); Mashrafe Mortaza 2/21 (4 overs)

Sylhet Sunrisers won by 7 wickets
Sher-e-Bangla National Cricket Stadium, Dhaka
Umpires: Masudur Rahman (Ban) and Sharfuddoula (Ban)
Player of the match: Nazmul Islam (Sylhet Sunrisers)

- Sylhet Sunrisers won the toss and elected to field.

25 January 2022
17:30 (N)
Scorecard

Comilla Victorians; 158/7 (20 overs)	v	Fortune Barishal; 95 (17.3 overs)
Mahmudul Hasan Joy 48 (35); Dwayne Bravo 3/30 (4 overs)		Najmul Hossain Shanto 36 (47); Nahidul Islam 3/5 (4 overs)

Comilla Victorians won by 63 runs
Sher-e-Bangla National Cricket Stadium, Dhaka
Umpires: Tanvir Ahmed (Ban) and Morshed Ali Khan (Ban)
Player of the match: Nahidul Islam (Comilla Victorians)

- Fortune Barishal won the toss and elected to field.

=== Phase 2 (Chittagong) ===
28 January 2022
13:30 (D/N)
Scorecard

Chattogram Challengers; 143/8 (20 overs)	v	Khulna Tigers; 144/4 (18.5 overs)
Afif Hossain 44 (37); Thisara Perera 3/18 (4 overs)		Andre Fletcher 58 (47); Mehidy Hasan 2/24 (3.5 overs)

Khulna Tigers won by 6 wickets
Zohur Ahmed Chowdhury Stadium, Chittagong
Umpires: Tanvir Ahmed (Ban) and Masudur Rahman (Ban)
Player of the match: Andre Fletcher (Khulna Tigers)

- Khulna Tigers won the toss and elected to field.

28 January 2022
18:30 (N)
Scorecard

Sylhet Sunrisers; 175/5 (20 overs)	v	Minister Dhaka; 177/1 (17 overs)
Lendl Simmons 116 (65); Qais Ahmad 1/26 (4 overs)		Tamim Iqbal 111* (64); Alauddin Babu 1/32 (2 overs)

Minister Dhaka won by 9 wickets
Zohur Ahmed Chowdhury Stadium, Chittagong
Umpires: Mahfuzur Rahman (Ban) and Prageeth Rambukwella (SL)
Player of the match: Tamim Iqbal (Minister Dhaka)

- Minister Dhaka won the toss and elected to field.

29 January 2022
12:30
Scorecard

Fortune Barishal; 141/9 (20 overs)	v	Khulna Tigers; 124 (19 overs)
Chris Gayle 45 (34); Farhad Reza 2/18 (2 overs)		Mushfiqur Rahim 40 (36); Mehedi Hasan Rana 4/17 (3 overs)

Fortune Barishal won by 17 runs
Zohur Ahmed Chowdhury Stadium, Chittagong
Umpires: Morshed Ali Khan (Ban) and Prageeth Rambukwella (SL)
Player of the match: Mehedi Hasan Rana (Fortune Barishal)

- Khulna Tigers won the toss and elected to field.

29 January 2022
17:30 (N)
Scorecard

Chattogram Challengers; 202/5 (20 overs)	v	Sylhet Sunrisers; 186/6 (20 overs)
Will Jacks 52 (19); Sohag Gazi 1/18 (2 overs)		Anamul Haque 78 (47); Mrittunjoy Chowdhury 3/33 (4 overs)

Chattogram Challengers won by 16 runs
Zohur Ahmed Chowdhury Stadium, Chittagong
Umpires: Mahfuzur Rahman (Ban) and Sharfuddoula (Ban)
Player of the match: Mrittunjoy Chowdhury (Chattogram Challengers)

- Sylhet Sunrisers won the toss and elected to field.
- Mrittunjoy Chowdhury (Chattogram Challengers) took a hat-trick.

31 January 2022
12:30
Scorecard

Comilla Victorians; 183/3 (20 overs)	v	Chattogram Challengers; 131 (17.3 overs)
Faf du Plessis 83* (55); Nasum Ahmed 2/23 (4 overs)		Will Jacks 69 (42); Nahidul Islam 3/17 (4 overs

Comilla Victorians won by 52 runs
Zohur Ahmed Chowdhury Stadium, Chittagong
Umpires: Morshed Ali Khan (Ban) and Sharfuddoula (Ban)
Player of the match: Faf du Plessis (Comilla Victorians)

- Chattogram Challengers won the toss and elected to field.

31 January 2022
17:30 (N)
Scorecard

Fortune Barishal; 145 (18.5 overs)	v	Khulna Tigers; 139/6 (20 overs)
Najmul Hossain Shanto 45 (40); Khaled Ahmed 3/41 (4 overs)		Yasir Ali 57* (34); Dwayne Bravo 3/40 (4 overs)

Fortune Barishal won by 6 runs
Zohur Ahmed Chowdhury Stadium, Chittagong
Umpires: Mahfuzur Rahman (Ban) and Prageeth Rambukwella (SL)
Player of the match: Shakib Al Hasan (Fortune Barishal)

- Fortune Barishal won the toss and elected to bat.
- Soumya Sarkar (Khulna Tigers) scored his 3,000th runs in T20 cricket.

1 February 2022
12:30
Scorecard

Minister Dhaka; 181/6 (20 overs)	v	Comilla Victorians; 131 (17.3 overs)
Mahmudullah 70* (41); Tanvir Islam 2/36 (4 overs)		Mahmudul Hasan Joy 46 (30); Andre Russell 3/17 (2.3 overs)

Minister Dhaka won by 50 runs
Zohur Ahmed Chowdhury Stadium, Chittagong
Umpires: Tanvir Ahmed (Ban) and Prageeth Rambukwella (SL)
Player of the match: Mahmudullah (Minister Dhaka)

- Comilla Victorians won the toss and elected to field.

1 February 2022
17:30 (N)
Scorecard

Fortune Barishal; 149 (19.1 overs)	v	Chattogram Challengers; 135 (19.4 overs)
Shakib Al Hasan 50 (31); Mrittunjoy Chowdhury 4/12 (2 overs)		Afif Hossain 39 (32); Mujeeb Ur Rahman 3/9 (4 overs)

Fortune Barishal won by 14 runs
Zohur Ahmed Chowdhury Stadium, Chittagong
Umpires: Mahfuzur Rahman (Ban) and Masudur Rahman (Ban)
Player of the match: Shakib Al Hasan (Fortune Barishal)

- Fortune Barishal won the toss and elected to bat.

=== Phase 3 (Dhaka) ===
3 February 2022
12:30
Scorecard

Sylhet Sunrisers; 142/5 (20 overs)	v	Khulna Tigers; 144/1 (14.2 overs)
Mohammad Mithun 72 (51); Khaled Ahmed 2/20 (4 overs)		Andre Fletcher 71* (47); Nazmul Islam 1/39 (3.2 overs)

Khulna Tigers won by 9 wickets
Sher-e-Bangla National Cricket Stadium, Dhaka
Umpires: Morshed Ali Khan (Ban) and Masudur Rahman (Ban)
Player of the match: Andre Fletcher (Khulna Tigers)

- Khulna Tigers won the toss and elected to field.

3 February 2022
17:30 (N)
Scorecard

Chattogram Challengers; 138/8 (18 overs)	v	Comilla Victorians; 148/1 (16.3 overs)
Will Jacks 57 (37); Mustafizur Rahman 5/27 (4 overs)		Imrul Kayes 81* (62); Mrittunjoy Chowdhury 1/21 (1.3 overs)

Comilla Victorians won by 9 wickets (DLS method)
Sher-e-Bangla National Cricket Stadium, Dhaka
Umpires: Mahfuzur Rahman (Ban) and Prageeth Rambukwella (SL)
Player of the match: Mustafizur Rahman (Comilla Victorians)

- Comilla Victorians won the toss and elected to field.
- Rain stopped play during Chattogram Challengers innings. Comilla Victorians were set a revised target of 144 runs from 18 overs.

4 February 2022
13:30 (D/N)
Scorecard

Fortune Barishal	v	Sylhet Sunrisers

Match abandoned
Sher-e-Bangla National Cricket Stadium, Dhaka
Umpires: Masudur Rahman (Ban) and Prageeth Rambukwella (SL)

- No toss.
- No play was possible due to rain.

4 February 2022
18:30 (N)
Scorecard

Comilla Victorians	v	Minister Dhaka

Match abandoned
Sher-e-Bangla National Cricket Stadium, Dhaka
Umpires: Tanvir Ahmed (Ban) and Mahfuzur Rahman (Ban)

- No toss
- No play was possible due to rain.

=== Phase 4 (Sylhet) ===
7 February 2022
12:30
Scorecard

Fortune Barishal; 155/5 (20 overs)	v	Comilla Victorians; 123/9 (20 overs)
Shakib Al Hasan 50 (37); Tanvir Islam 2/22 (3 overs)		Mominul Haque 30 (30); Nayeem Hasan 3/29 (4 overs)

Fortune Barishal won by 32 runs
Sylhet International Cricket Stadium, Sylhet
Umpires: Mozahiduzzaman (Ban) and Masudur Rahman (Ban)
Player of the match: Shakib Al Hasan (Fortune Barishal)

- Comilla Victorians won the toss and elected to field.

7 February 2022
17:30 (N)
Scorecard

Khulna Tigers; 182/3 (20 overs)	v	Sylhet Sunrisers; 167/6 (20 overs)
Soumya Sarkar 82* (62); Sohag Gazi 1/27 (4 overs)		Anamul Haque 47 (33); Thisara Perera 2/23 (4 overs)

Khulna Tigers won by 15 runs
Sylhet International Cricket Stadium, Sylhet
Umpires: Mahfuzur Rahman (Ban) and Prageeth Rambukwella (SL)
Player of the match: Soumya Sarkar (Khulna Tigers)

- Sylhet Sunrisers won the toss and elected to field.

8 February 2022
12:30
Scorecard

Chattogram Challengers; 148/6 (20 overs)	v	Minister Dhaka; 145/6 (20 overs)
Shamim Hossain 52 (37); Mahmudullah 1/5 (1 over)		Tamim Iqbal 73* (56); Mrittunjoy Chowdhury 2/21 (4 overs)

Chattogram Challengers won by 3 runs
Sylhet International Cricket Stadium, Sylhet
Umpires: Mahfuzur Rahman (Ban) and Prageeth Rambukwella (SL)
Player of the match: Shamim Hossain (Chattogram Challengers)

- Minister Dhaka won the toss and elected to field.

8 February 2022
17:30 (N)
Scorecard

Fortune Barishal; 199/4 (20 overs)	v	Sylhet Sunrisers; 187/6 (20 overs)
Chris Gayle 51* (45); Nazmul Islam 1/14 (2 overs)		Colin Ingram 90 (49); Najmul Hossain Shanto 2/2 (1 over)

Fortune Barishal won by 12 runs
Sylhet International Cricket Stadium, Sylhet
Umpires: Tanvir Ahmed (Ban) and Mozahiduzzaman (Ban)
Player of the match: Shakib Al Hasan (Fortune Barishal)

- Sylhet Sunrisers won the toss and elected to field.

9 February 2022
12:30
Scorecard

Khulna Tigers; 129/8 (20 overs)	v	Minister Dhaka; 131/5 (19.2 overs)
Sikandar Raza 64 (50); Arafat Sunny 2/15 (3 overs)		Mahmudullah 34 (36); Thisara Perera 2/39 (3.2 overs)

Minister Dhaka won by 5 wickets
Sylhet International Cricket Stadium, Sylhet
Umpires: Tanvir Ahmed (Ban) and Prageeth Rambukwella (SL)
Player of the match: Arafat Sunny (Minster Dhaka)

- Khulna Tigers won the toss and elected to bat.

9 February 2022
17:30 (N)
Scorecard

Sylhet Sunrisers; 169/5 (20 overs)	v	Comilla Victorians; 173/6 (19.5 overs)
Colin Ingram 89 (63); Mustafizur Rahman 3/23 (4 overs)		Mahmudul Hasan Joy 65 (50); Alauddin Babu 2/24 (3.5 overs)

Comilla Victorians won by 4 wickets
Sylhet International Cricket Stadium, Sylhet
Umpires: Mozahiduzzaman (Ban) and Mahfuzur Rahman (Ban)
Player of the match: Mahmudul Hasan Joy (Comilla Victorians)

- Comilla Victorians won the toss and elected to field.

=== Phase 5 (Dhaka) ===
11 February 2022
13:30 (D/N)
Scorecard

Comilla Victorians; 188/6 (20 overs)	v	Khulna Tigers; 123 (19.3 overs)
Moeen Ali 75 (35); Thisara Perera 2/28 (3 overs)		Thisara Perera 26 (33); Abu Hider 3/19 (4 overs)

Comilla Victorians won by 65 runs
Sher-e-Bangla National Cricket Stadium, Dhaka
Umpires: Morshed Ali Khan (Ban) and Masudur Rahman (Ban)
Player of the match: Moeen Ali (Comilla Victorians)

- Khulna Tigers won the toss and elected to field.

11 February 2022
18:30 (N)
Scorecard

Minister Dhaka; 128/9 (20 overs)	v	Fortune Barishal; 129/2 (15.3 overs)
Tamim Iqbal 66 (50); Mehedi Hasan Rana 2/12 (2 overs)		Shakib Al Hasan 51* (29); Qais Ahmad 1/15 (1 over)

Fortune Barishal won by 8 wickets
Sher-e-Bangla National Cricket Stadium, Dhaka
Umpires: Mahfuzur Rahman (Ban) and Prageeth Rambukwella (SL)
Player of the match: Shakib Al Hasan (Fortune Barishal)

- Minister Dhaka won the toss and elected to bat.

12 February 2022
12:30
Scorecard

Sylhet Sunrisers; 185/6 (20 overs)	v	Chattogram Challengers; 188/6 (19.1 overs)
Ravi Bopara 44 (21); Mrittunjoy Chowdhury 3/37 (4 overs)		Will Jacks 91* (57); Sohag Gazi 2/21 (3 overs)

Chattogram Challengers won by 4 wickets
Sher-e-Bangla National Cricket Stadium, Dhaka
Umpires: Masudur Rahman (Ban) and Prageeth Rambukwella (SL)
Player of the match: Will Jacks (Chattogram Challengers)

- Chattogram Challengers won the toss and elected to field.

12 February 2022
17:30 (N)
Scorecard

Comilla Victorians; 182/5 (20 overs)	v	Khulna Tigers; 183/1 (18.4 overs)
Faf du Plessis 101 (54); Mahedi Hasan 1/29 (4 overs)		Andre Fletcher 101* (62); Moeen Ali 1/13 (1.4 overs)

Khulna Tigers won by 9 wickets
Sher-e-Bangla National Cricket Stadium, Dhaka
Umpires: Tanvir Ahmed (Ban) and Mahfuzur Rahman (Ban)
Player of the match: Andre Fletcher (Khulna Tigers)

- Comilla Victorians won the toss and elected to bat.

== Playoffs ==
Semifinals
14 February 2022 — Dhaka
1	Fortune Barishal	143/8 (20 overs
2	Comilla Victorians	133/7 (20 overs)
14 February 2022 — Dhaka
3	Chattogram Challengers	189/5 (20 overs)
4	Khulna Tigers	182/5 (20 overs)

Preliminary final
16 February 2022 — Dhaka
2	Comilla Victorians	149/3 (12.5 overs)
3	Chattogram Challengers	148 (19.1 overs)

Final
18 February 2022 — Dhaka
1	Fortune Barishal	150/8 (20 overs)
2	Comilla Victorians	151/9 (20 overs)

=== Eliminator ===
14 February 2022
12:30
Scorecard

Chattogram Challengers; 189/5 (20 overs)	v	Khulna Tigers; 182/5 (20 overs)
Chadwick Walton 89* (44); Khaled Ahmed 2/40 (4 overs)		Andre Fletcher 80* (58); Mehidy Hasan 2/40 (4 overs)

Chattogram Challengers won by 7 runs
Sher-e-Bangla National Cricket Stadium, Dhaka
Umpires: Mahfuzur Rahman (Ban) and Prageeth Rambukwella (SL)
Player of the match: Chadwick Walton (Chattogram Challengers)

- Khulna Tigers won the toss and elected to field.

=== Qualifiers ===
Qualifier 1

14 February 2022
17:30 (N)
Scorecard

Fortune Barishal; 143/8 (20 overs)	v	Comilla Victorians; 133/7 (20 overs)
Munim Shahriar 44 (30); Shohidul Islam 3/25 (3 overs)		Litton Das 38 (35); Mehedi Hasan Rana 2/15 (3 overs)

Fortune Barishal won by 10 runs
Sher-e-Bangla National Cricket Stadium, Dhaka
Umpires: Tanvir Ahmed (Ban) and Masudur Rahman (Ban)
Player of the match: Mehedi Hasan Rana (Fortune Barishal)

- Comilla Victorians won the toss and elected to field.

Qualifier 2

16 February 2022
17:30 (N)
Scorecard

Chattogram Challengers; 148 (19.1 overs)	v	Comilla Victorians; 149/3 (12.5 overs)
Mehidy Hasan 44 (38); Moeen Ali 3/20 (3 overs)		Sunil Narine 57 (16); Benny Howell 1/11 (2 overs)

Comilla Victorians won by 7 wickets
Sher-e-Bangla National Cricket Stadium, Dhaka
Umpires: Tanvir Ahmed (Ban) and Prageeth Rambukwella (SL)
Player of the match: Sunil Narine (Comilla Victorians)

- Chattogram Challengers won the toss and elected to bat.
- Sunil Narine (Comilla Victorians) scored the fastest fifty in BPL (13 balls).

=== Final ===
18 February 2022
17:30 (N)
Scorecard

Comilla Victorians; 151/9 (20 overs)	v	Fortune Barishal; 150/8 (20 overs)
Sunil Narine 57 (23); Mujeeb Ur Rahman 2/27 (4 overs)		Shykat Ali 58 (34); Sunil Narine 2/15 (4 overs)

Comilla Victorians won by 1 run
Sher-e-Bangla National Cricket Stadium, Dhaka
Umpires: Masudur Rahman (Ban) and Prageeth Rambukwella (SL)
Player of the match: Sunil Narine (Comilla Victorians)

- Comilla Victorians won the toss and elected to bat.

== Statistics ==
Most runs
Player	Team	Matches	Runs
Will Jacks	Chattogram Challengers	11	414
Andre Fletcher	Khulna Tigers	11	410
Tamim Iqbal	Minister Dhaka	9	407
Colin Ingram	Sylhet Sunrisers	9	333
Faf du Plessis	Comilla Victorians	11	295

- Source: Cricinfo.com

Most wickets
Player	Team	Matches	Wickets
Mustafizur Rahman	Comilla Victorians	11	19
Dwayne Bravo	Fortune Barishal	10	18
Shakib Al Hasan	Fortune Barishal	11	16
Tanvir Islam	Comilla Victorians	12	16
Mrittunjoy Chowdhury	Chattogram Challengers	8	15

- Source: Cricinfo.com

Highest team totals
Team	Total	Opponent	Ground	Result
Chattogram Challengers	202/5	Sylhet Sunrisers	Zohur Ahmed Chowdhury Stadium	Won
Fortune Barishal	199/4	Sylhet Sunrisers	Sylhet International Cricket Stadium	Won
Chattogram Challengers	190/7	Khulna Tigers	Sher-e-Bangla National Cricket Stadium	Won

- Source: Cricinfo.com
