= 2016 Dhaka Dynamites season =

Dhaka cricket team in 2016

Dhaka Dynamites
2016 Bangladesh Premier League season
- Coach: Khaled Mahmud
- Captain: Shakib Al Hasan
- Ground(s): Sher-e-Bangla Cricket Stadium, Mirpur
- BPL: Champions (1st title)

The Dhaka Dynamites are a franchise cricket team based in Dhaka, Bangladesh, which plays in the Bangladesh Premier League (BPL). They were one of the seven teams that competed in the 2016 Bangladesh Premier League. The team was captained by Shakib Al Hasan.

== Player draft ==
The 2016 BPL draft was held on 30 September. Before the draft, the seven clubs signed 38 foreign players to contracts and each existing franchise was able to retain two home-grown players from the 2015 season. A total of 301 players participated in the draft, including 133 local and 168 foreign players. 85 players were selected in the draft.

=== Player transfers ===
Before the 2016 draft, several high-profile players moved teams. These included transfers between competing teams and due to the suspension of Shakib Al Hasan as team captain of Dhaka Dynamites from Rangpur Riders.

== Owners and sponsorship ==
The owners of the Dynamites are Beximco, a company specialising in producing clothing materials. Beximco produces textiles, basic chemicals, pharmaceuticals, jute and marine foods; the company also has real estate and land development interests. Bangladesh Export Import Company (BEXIMCO) is a Bangladeshi industrial conglomerate. The industries under this Group include Textiles, Basic Chemicals and Pharmaceuticals, Jute, Marine Foods, Real Estate and Development. Services provided by Beximco include Engineering, Media, Information Technology, Trade and Financial Services. Beximco Pharmaceuticals and Shinepukur Ceramics are the two units that have got world-class factories.

In 2012 and 2013, sponsorship of the then-Gladiators was bought by BBS Cables for 112.50 million for each season, and Oriental Group bought co-sponsorship for 15 million for each season. Beximco secured the sponsorship for the team during the third season.

== Points table ==
Pos	Team	Pld	W	L	NR	Pts	NRR
1	Dhaka Dynamites (C)	12	8	4	0	16	0.912
2	Khulna Titans (3)	12	7	5	0	14	−0.215
3	Chittagong Vikings (4)	12	6	6	0	12	0.233
4	Rajshahi Kings (R)	12	6	6	0	12	0.208
5	Rangpur Riders	12	6	6	0	12	−0.106
6	Comilla Victorians	12	5	7	0	10	−0.345
7	Barisal Bulls	12	4	8	0	8	−0.688

Source: Cricinfo.com
- The top four teams qualified for playoffs
- advanced to the Qualifier
- advanced to the Eliminator

== League stage ==
8 November 2016
19:00 (D/N)
Scorecard

Barisal Bulls; 148/6 (20 overs)	v	Dhaka Dynamites; 149/2 (16 overs)
Shahriar Nafees 55 (34); Mohammad Shahid 3/21 (4 overs)		Mehedi Maruf 75 (45); Taijul Islam 1/14(2 overs)

Dhaka won by 8 wickets
Sher-e-Bangla National Cricket Stadium, Mirpur
Umpires: Khalid Mahmood (Pak) and Nadir Shah (Ban)
Player of the match: Mehedi Maruf (Dhaka Dynamites)

- Dhaka Dynamites won the toss and elected to field.
- Mahedi Hasan (Barisal Bulls) made his T20 debut.

11 November 2016
19:15 (D/N)
Scorecard

Dhaka Dynamites; 138/5 (20 overs)	v	Rajshahi Kings; 139/4 (18.1 overs)
Mosaddek Hossain 59* (46); Samit Patel 2/20 (4 overs)		Samit Patel 44* (25); Abu Jayed 1/14 (2 overs)

Rajshahi won by 6 wickets
Sher-e-Bangla National Cricket Stadium, Mirpur
Umpires: Khalid Mahmood (Pak) and Mahfuzur Rahman (Ban)
Player of the match: Samit Patel (Rajshahi Kings)

- Rajshahi Kings won the toss and elected to field.

12 November 2016
19:00 (D/N)
Scorecard

Dhaka Dynamites; 170/6 (20 overs)	v	Rangpur Riders; 92/9 (19.2 overs)
Mosaddek Hossain 48 (28); Shahid Afridi 2/22 (4 overs)		Naeem Islam 29 (26); Shakib Al Hasan 2/17 (4 overs)

Dhaka won by 78 runs
Sher-e-Bangla National Cricket Stadium, Mirpur
Umpires: Khalid Mahmood (Pak) and Nadir Shah (Ban)
Player of the match: Mosaddek Hossain (Dhaka Dynamites)

- Rangpur Riders won the toss and elected to field.

14 November 2016
19:00 (D/N)
Scorecard

Dhaka Dynamites; 194/5 (20 overs)	v	Comilla Victorians; 161/9 (20 overs)
Mehedi Maruf 60 (39); Rashid Khan 3/28 (4 overs)		Mashrafe Mortaza 47 (35); Mohammad Shahid 3/34 (4 overs)

Dhaka won by 33 runs
Sher-e-Bangla National Cricket Stadium, Mirpur
Umpires: Ranmore Martinesz (SL) and Nadir Shah (Ban)
Player of the match: Mehedi Maruf (Dhaka Dynamites)

- Comilla Victorians won the toss and elected to field.
- This was a replay of the match from 5 November 2016.

17 November 2016
13:00
Scorecard

Dhaka Dynamites; 148/9 (20 overs)	v	Chittagong Vikings; 129/8 (20 overs)
Mosaddek Hossain 35 (26); Mohammad Nabi 3/18 (3 overs)		Tamim Iqbal 26 (35); Mohammad Shahid 3/23 (4 overs)

Dhaka won by 19 runs
Zohur Ahmed Chowdhury Stadium, Chittagong
Umpires: Ranmore Martinesz (SL) and Nadir Shah (Ban)
Player of the match: Mohammad Shahid (Dhaka Dynamites)

- Chittagong Vikings won the toss and elected to field.

19 November 2016
13:00
Scorecard

Khulna Titans; 157/5 (20 overs)	v	Dhaka Dynamites; 148 (19.1 overs)
Mahmudullah 62 (44); Dwayne Bravo 2/27 (4 overs)		Seekkuge Prasanna 53 (22); Mosharraf Hossain 3/31 (4 overs)

Khulna won by 9 runs
Zohur Ahmed Chowdhury Stadium, Chittagong
Umpires: Khalid Mahmood (Pak) and Masudur Rahman (Ban)
Player of the match: Mosharraf Hossain (Khulna Titans)

- Khulna Titans won the toss and elected to bat.

21 November 2016
13:00
Scorecard

Dhaka Dynamites; 182/4 (20 overs)	v	Rajshahi Kings; 184/7 (19.5 overs)
Kumar Sangakkara 66 (46); Farhad Reza 2/22 (3 overs)		Samit Patel 75 (39); Dwayne Bravo 3/35 (4 overs)

Rajshahi won by 3 wickets
Zohur Ahmed Chowdhury Stadium, Chittagong
Umpires: Ranmore Martinesz (SL) and Nadir Shah (Ban)
Player of the match: Samit Patel (Rajshahi Kings)

- Dhaka Dynamites won the toss and elected to bat.

26 November 2016
13:00
Scorecard

Dhaka Dynamites; 170/4 (20 overs)	v	Comilla Victorians; 138/8 (20 overs)
Shakib Al Hasan 41 (26); Rashid Khan 2/26 (4 overs)		Khalid Latif 38 (33); Dwayne Bravo 3/32 (4 overs)

Dhaka won by 32 runs
Sher-e-Bangla National Cricket Stadium, Mirpur
Umpires: Khalid Mahmood (Pak) and Nadir Shah (Ban)
Player of the match: Shakib Al Hasan (Dhaka Dynamites)

- Dhaka Dynamites won the toss and elected to bat.

27 November 2016
13:00
Scorecard

Barisal Bulls; 132/6 (20 overs)	v	Dhaka Dynamites; 135/6 (19.2 overs)
Mushfiqur Rahim 36 (30); Abu Jayed 1/12 (4 overs)		Nasir Hossain 34 (29); Taijul Islam 2/19 (4 overs)

Dhaka won by 4 wickets
Sher-e-Bangla National Cricket Stadium, Mirpur
Umpires: Khalid Mahmood (Pak) and Masudur Rahman (Ban)
Player of the match: Shakib Al Hasan (Dhaka Dynamites)

- Barisal Bulls won the toss and elected to bat.

30 November 2016
13:00
Scorecard

Dhaka Dynamites; 188/7 (20 overs)	v	Rangpur Riders; 146/8 (20 overs)
Evin Lewis 75 (34); Rubel Hossain 3/25 (4 overs)		Ziaur Rahman 60 (43); Abu Jayed 3/20 (4 overs)

Dhaka won by 42 runs
Sher-e-Bangla National Cricket Stadium, Mirpur
Umpires: Masudur Rahman (Ban) and Rashid Riaz (Pak)
Player of the match: Evin Lewis (Dhaka Dynamites)

- Dhaka Dynamites won the toss and elected to bat.
- As a result of this match, Dhaka Dynamites qualified

2 December 2016
18:15 (D/N)
Scorecard

Chittagong Vikings; 134/6 (20 overs)	v	Dhaka Dynamites; 135/4 (18.2 overs)
Tamim Iqbal 74 (59); Dwayne Bravo 3/27 (4 overs)		Kumar Sangakkara 35 (35); Mohammad Nabi 1/2 (2 overs)

Dhaka won by 6 wickets
Sher-e-Bangla National Cricket Stadium, Mirpur
Umpires: Khalid Mahmood (Pak) and Masudur Rahman (Ban)
Player of the match: Dwayne Bravo (Dhaka Dynamites)

- Dhaka Dynamites won the toss and elected to field.

4 December 2016
17:45 (D/N)
Scorecard

Dhaka Dynamites; 158/7 (20 overs)	v	Khulna Titans; 159/4 (18 overs)
Kumar Sangakkara 59 (41); Junaid Khan 3/22 (4 overs)		Mahmudullah 50 (28); Ravi Bopara 2/17 (3 overs)

Khulna won by 6 wickets
Sher-e-Bangla National Cricket Stadium, Mirpur
Umpires: Morshed Ali Khan (Ban) and Ranmore Martinesz (SL)
Player of the match: Mahmudullah (Khulna Titans)

- Khulna Titans won the toss and elected to field.

== Playoffs ==
=== Qualifier 1 ===
6 December 2016
17:45 (D/N)
Scorecard

Dhaka Dynamites; 140/8 (20 overs)	v	Khulna Titans; 86 (16.2 overs)
Andre Russell 46 (25); Junaid Khan 4/24 (4 overs)		Andre Fletcher 28 (22); Dwayne Bravo 3/10 (2.2 overs)

Dhaka won by 54 runs
Sher-e-Bangla National Cricket Stadium, Dhaka
Umpires: Khalid Mahmood (Pak) and Nadir Shah (Ban)
Player of the match: Andre Russell (Dhaka Dynamites)

- Khulna Titans won the toss and elected to field.
- Dhaka Dynamites advanced to Final and Khulna Titans goes to Qualifier 2

=== Final ===
9 December 2016
17:45 (D/N)
Scorecard

Dhaka Dynamites; 159/9 (20 overs)	v	Rajshahi Kings; 103 (17.4 overs)
Evin Lewis 45 (31); Farhad Reza 3/28 (4 overs)		Mominul Haque 27 (30); Abu Jayed 2/12 (3 overs)

Dhaka won by 56 runs
Sher-e-Bangla National Cricket Stadium, Dhaka
Umpires: Khalid Mahmood (Pak) and Mahfuzur Rahman (Ban)
Player of the match: Kumar Sangakkara (Dhaka Dynamites)

- Rajshahi Kings won the toss and elected to field.
- Dhaka Dynamites won the championship and Rajshahi Kings became runners-up

== Squad ==
Name	Nationality	Batting style	Bowling style	Year signed	Notes
Batsmen
Evin Lewis	West Indies	Left-handed	Right-arm medium	2016	
Mehedi Maruf	Bangladesh	Right-handed	Right-arm off break	2016	
Mahela Jayawardene	Sri Lanka	Right-handed	Right-arm medium	2016	
All-rounders
Shakib Al Hasan	Bangladesh	Left-handed	Slow Left-arm orthodox	2016	Captain
Mosaddek Hossain	Bangladesh	Right-handed	Right-arm off-break	2015	
Dwayne Bravo	West Indies	Right-handed	Right-arm medium-fast	2016	
Andre Russell	West Indies	Right-handed	Right-arm fast	2016	
Ravi Bopara	England	Right-handed	Right-arm medium	2016	
Wayne Parnell	South Africa	Left-handed	Left-arm fast	2015	
Seekkuge Prasanna	Sri Lanka	Right-handed	Legbreak	2016	
Matt Coles	England	Left-handed	Right-arm fast	2016	
Nasir Hossain	Bangladesh	Right-handed	Right-arm off-break	2015	
Alauddin Babu	Bangladesh	Right-handed	Right-arm medium fast	2016	
Tanbir Hayder	Bangladesh	Right-handed	Legbreak	2016	
Wicket-keepers
Irfan Sukkur	Bangladesh	Right-handed	–	2015	Opener
Kumar Sangakkara	Sri Lanka	Left-handed	–	2015	Opener
Bowlers
Mohammad Shahid	Bangladesh	Right-handed	Right-arm medium-fast	2016	
Abu Jayed	Bangladesh	Right-handed	Right-arm fast-medium	2016	
Usama Mir	Pakistan	Right-handed	Leg-break	2016	
Suhrawadi Shuvo	Bangladesh	Left-handed	Slow left-arm orthodox	2016	
Sunzamul Islam	Bangladesh	Right-handed	slow left-arm orthodox	2016	

== Statistics ==
Most runs
Player	Innings	Runs
Kumar Sangakkara	13	370
Mehedi Maruf	13	347
Mosaddek Hossain	14	304

- Source: CricInfo

Most wickets
Player	Innings	Wickets
Dwayne Bravo	13	21
Mohammad Shahid	8	15
Shakib Al Hasan	14	13

- Source: CricInfo
