= 2016 Comilla Victorians season =

Comilla Victorians
2016 Bangladesh Premier League season
- Captain: Mashrafe Mortaza

The Comilla Victorians are a franchise cricket team based in Comilla, Bangladesh, which plays in the Bangladesh Premier League (BPL). They were one of the seven teams that competed in the 2016 Bangladesh Premier League. The team was captained by Mashrafe Mortaza.

== Player draft ==
The 2016 BPL draft was held on 30 September. Prior to the draft, the seven clubs signed 38 foreign players to contracts and each existing franchise was able to retain two home-grown players from the 2015 season. A total 301 players participated in the draft, including 133 local and 168 foreign players. 85 players were selected in the draft.

== Points table ==
Pos	Team	Pld	W	L	NR	Pts	NRR
1	Dhaka Dynamites (C)	12	8	4	0	16	0.912
2	Khulna Titans (3)	12	7	5	0	14	−0.215
3	Chittagong Vikings (4)	12	6	6	0	12	0.233
4	Rajshahi Kings (R)	12	6	6	0	12	0.208
5	Rangpur Riders	12	6	6	0	12	−0.106
6	Comilla Victorians	12	5	7	0	10	−0.345
7	Barisal Bulls	12	4	8	0	8	−0.688

Source: Cricinfo.com
- The top four teams qualified for playoffs
- advanced to the Qualifier
- advanced to the Eliminator

== Squad ==
Name	Nationality	Batting style	Bowling style	Year signed	Notes
Batsmen
Imrul Kayes	Bangladesh	Left-handed		2016	
Nazmul Hossain Shanto	Bangladesh	Left-handed	Left arm offbreak	2016	
Khalid Latif	Pakistan	Right-handed	Right-arm leg break	2016	
Ahmed Shehzad	Pakistan	Right-handed	Right-arm leg break	2015	Overseas
Saikat Ali	Bangladesh	Right-handed	Right-arm medium fast	2016	
Rovman Powell	West Indies	Right-handed	Right-arm medium-fast	2016	
Marlon Samuels	West Indies	Right-handed	Right-arm offbreak	2015	Overseas
All-rounders
Sohail Tanvir	Pakistan	Left-handed	Left-arm medium-fast	2016	Overseas
Jason Holder	West Indies	Right-handed	Right-arm medium-fast	2016	Overseas
Nahidul Islam	Bangladesh	Left-handed	Left-arm medium	2016	
Abdullah Al Mamun	Bangladesh	Right-handed	Right-arm medium-fast	2016	
Imad Wasim	Pakistan	Left-handed	Slow left-arm orthodox	2016	Overseas
Sunil Narine	West Indies	Left-handed	Right-arm offbreak	2015	Overseas
Ryan Ten Doeschate	Netherlands	Right-handed	Right-arm medium fast	2016	Overseas
Ashar Zaidi	England	Left-handed	Slow left-arm orthodox	2015	Overseas
Wicket-keepers
Liton Das	Bangladesh	Right-handed	–	2015	
Jashimuddin	Bangladesh	Right-handed	–	2016	
Bowlers
Mashrafe Mortaza	Bangladesh	Right-handed	Right-arm medium fast	2015	Captain
Nuwan Kulasekara	Sri Lanka	Right-handed	Right-arm fast medium	2015	Overseas
Mohammad Saifuddin	Bangladesh	Left-handed	Right-arm medium fast	2016	
Shahadat Hossain	Bangladesh	Right-handed	Right-arm medium fast	2016	
Mohammad Sharif	Bangladesh	Right-handed	Right-arm medium fast	2016	
Rashid Khan	Afghanistan	Right-handed	Right-arm legbreak	2016	Overseas
Nabil Samad	Bangladesh	Left-handed	Slow left arm orthodox	2016	
