= 2016–17 Bangladesh Premier League =

Cricket Tournament

2016 Bangladesh Premier League
- Dates: 8 November 2016 – 9 December 2016
- Administrator: Bangladesh Cricket Board
- Cricket format: Twenty20
- Tournament format(s): Double round-robin and playoffs
- Host: Bangladesh
- Champions: Dhaka Dynamites (3rd title)
- Runners-up: Rajshahi Kings
- Participants: 7
- Matches: 46
- Player of the series: Mahmudullah (Khulna Titans)
- Most runs: Tamim Iqbal (Chittagong Vikings) (476)
- Most wickets: Dwayne Bravo (Dhaka Dynamites) (21)
- Official website: BPL

The Bangladesh Premier League 2016, also known as BPL Season 4 and AKS BPL 2016 (for sponsorship reasons) was the fourth season of the Bangladesh Premier League (BPL), the top level professional Twenty20 cricket franchise league in Bangladesh. The competition was organised by the Bangladesh Cricket Board (BCB) and featured seven teams. The season originally began on 4 November 2016 and ended on 9 December 2016. However, after the first four matches of the tournament were abandoned due to rain and with more rain forecast, the league opted to restart on 8 November and to replay all six of the opening six matches.

Two new teams, Khulna Titans and Rajshahi Kings played in the competition under new owners after the original franchisees were not allowed to enter the 2015 competition, while the Sylhet Super Stars franchise was excluded from the competition. The BCB originally claimed that Sylhet had breached franchisee agreements or not paid bank guarantees, but on 21 September clarified that the franchise had been excluded for "disciplinary reasons". Comilla Victorians were the defending champions but were eliminated in the group stage. In the championship game, Dhaka Dynamites defeated Rajshahi Kings to win their third title.

== Draft and Squads ==
The 2016 BPL draft was held on 30 September. Prior to the draft, the seven clubs signed 38 foreign players to contracts and each existing franchise was able to retain two home-grown players from the 2015 season. A total 301 players participated in the draft, including 133 local and 168 foreign players. 85 players were selected in the draft.

=== Player transfers ===
Prior to the 2016 draft, a number of high-profile players moved teams. These included transfers between competing teams and due to the suspension of the Sylhet Super Stars and the introduction of two new teams, Khulna Titans and Rajshahi Kings. Transfers included the move of Barisal Bulls captain Mahmudullah Riyad to the Khulna Titans, Chris Gayle from the Barisal Bulls to the Chittagong Vikings, the signing of Shahid Afridi as team captain of Rangpur Riders from the Sylhet Super Stars and Shakib Al Hasan as team captain of Dhaka Dynamites from Rangpur Riders.

| Dhaka Dynamites Coach: Khaled Mahmud | Chittagong Vikings Coach: Simon Helmot | Barisal Bulls Coach: Dev Whatmore | Khulna Titans Coach: Mahela Jayawardene | Rajshahi Kings Coach: Lance Klusener | Rangpur Riders Coach: Tom Moody | Comilla Victorians Coach: Mohammad Salahuddin |
|---|---|---|---|---|---|---|
| Shakib Al Hasan (c); Kumar Sangakkara; Mahela Jayawardena; Evin Lewis; Ravi Bopara; Dwayne Bravo; Matt Coles; Mosaddek Hossain; Nasir Hossain; Andre Russell; Seekkuge Prasanna; Irfan Shukkur; Alauddin Babu; Tanbir Hayder; Suhrawardi Shuvo; Sunzamul Islam; Mohammad Shahid; Wayne Parnell; Usama Mir; Mehedi Maruf | Tamim Iqbal (c); Chris Gayle; Anamul Haque; Jahurul Islam; Zakir Hasan; Yasir Ali; Grant Elliott; Mohammad Nabi; Shoaib Malik; Dwayne Smith; Jeevan Mendis; Nazmul Hossain Milon; Chaturanga de Silva; Abdur Razzak; Taskin Ahmed; Shohidul Islam; Tymal Mills; Imran Khan; Jubair Hossain; Saqlain Sajib; Subashis Roy | Mushfiqur Rahim (c); Dilshan Munaweera; Dawid Malan; Shahriar Nafees; Shamsur Rahman; Dhiman Ghosh; Nadif Chowdhury; Carlos Brathwaite; Josh Cobb; Fazle Mahmud; Rayad Emrit; Jeevan Mendis; Mohammad Nawaz; Thisara Perera; Mahedi Hasan; Taijul Islam; Al Amin Hossain; Abu Hider Rony; Kamrul Islam Rabbi; Rumman Raees; Monir Hossain; Shahin Hossain | Mahmudullah (c); Andre Fletcher; Lendl Simmons; Nicholas Pooran; Riki Wessels; Alok Kapali; Ariful Haque; Abdul Mazid; Abu Sayem; Kevon Cooper; Benny Howell; Shuvagata Hom; Mosharraf Hossain; Taibur Rahman; Junaid Khan; Ben Laughlin; Mohammad Asghar; Shafiul Islam; Abdul Halim; Hasanuzzaman; Saddam Hossain; Naeem Islam Jnr | Darren Sammy (c); Rony Talukder; Upul Tharanga; Umar Akmal; Mehidy Hasan Miraz; Mominul Haque; Samit Patel; Sabbir Rahman; Farhad Reza; Nurul Hasan; Raqibul Hasan; Salman Hossain Emon; Milinda Siriwardana; Abul Hasan; Delwar Hossain; Ebadot Hossain; Mohammad Sami; Nazmul Islam; Kesrick Williams | Naeem Islam (c); Babar Azam; Mohammad Mithun; Mohammad Shahzad; Nasir Jamshed; Pinak Ghosh; David Miller; Gidron Pope; Gihan Rupasinghe; Sharjeel Khan; Muktar Ali; Shahid Afridi; Dasun Shanaka; Sohag Gazi; Soumya Sarkar; Ziaur Rahman; Anwar Ali; Arafat Sunny; Elias Sunny; Richard Gleeson; Rubel Hossain; Sachithra Senanayake; Jupiter Ghosh; Mehrab Hossain; Shahbaz Chouhan | Mashrafe Mortaza (c); Ahmed Shehzad; Imrul Kayes; Litton Das; Najmul Hossain Shanto; Rovman Powell; Marlon Samuels; Shahzaib Hasan; Ashar Zaidi; Khalid Latif; Imad Wasim; Mohammad Saifuddin; Nahidul Islam; Rashid Khan; Shykat Ali; Jason Holder; Nuwan Kulasekara; Nabil Samad; Sohail Tanvir; Abdullah Al Mamun; Al-Amin; Jasimuddin; Mohammad Sharif |

== Venues ==
A total of 46 matches, including the final, were played at two venues in Chittagong and Dhaka. The Zohur Ahmed Chowdhury Stadium in Chittagong hosted eleven (11) matches in the middle block of games, with the majority of matches (35), including all playoff matches and the final being held at the Sher-e-Bangla National Cricket Stadium in Dhaka. 25,000 people attended the final.

| Chittagong | Dhaka |
|---|---|
| Zohur Ahmed Chowdhury Stadium | Sher-e-Bangla National Cricket Stadium |
| Capacity: 22,000 | Capacity: 25,000 |
| Zahur Ahmed Chowdhury Stadium | Sher-e-Bangla National Cricket Stadium |
2016–17 Bangladesh Premier League is located in Bangladesh

== Points table ==
| Pos | Team | Pld | W | L | NR | Pts | NRR |
|---|---|---|---|---|---|---|---|
| 1 | Dhaka Dynamites (C) | 12 | 8 | 4 | 0 | 16 | 0.912 |
| 2 | Khulna Titans (3) | 12 | 7 | 5 | 0 | 14 | −0.215 |
| 3 | Chittagong Vikings (4) | 12 | 6 | 6 | 0 | 12 | 0.233 |
| 4 | Rajshahi Kings (R) | 12 | 6 | 6 | 0 | 12 | 0.208 |
| 5 | Rangpur Riders | 12 | 6 | 6 | 0 | 12 | −0.106 |
| 6 | Comilla Victorians | 12 | 5 | 7 | 0 | 10 | −0.345 |
| 7 | Barisal Bulls | 12 | 4 | 8 | 0 | 8 | −0.688 |

Source: Cricinfo.com
- The top four teams qualified for playoffs
- advanced to the Qualifier
- advanced to the Eliminator

== League stage ==
A total of 46 matches were played in the tournament. During the round-robin group stage each team played 12 matches, two against each other team taking part in the tournament. In total 42 matches were played in the group stage, with the top four teams progressing to the playoff stage of the tournament where three playoff matches and the final were played, the final taking place on 9 December at the Sher-e-Bangla National Cricket Stadium in Dhaka.

Group stage matches were played in three blocks. The first and third blocks took place in Dhaka, with the middle block of 10 matches taking place in Chittagong. Two matches were played on each day of the group stage part of the tournament. The first four matches of the tournament were washed out after heavy rain, and the two matches scheduled to take place on 6 November were postponed. The tournament was restarted on 8 November with the first six fixtures rescheduled and the matches from the opening day of fixtures replayed, with the points table reset.

=== Rain-affected fixtures ===
The following six matches were all affected by rain, with only the first one technically starting with a toss taking place. All of the results were removed from the points table and rescheduled for later in the tournament.

4 November 2016
14:30

| Comilla Victorians | v | Rajshahi Kings |

No result
Sher-e-Bangla National Cricket Stadium, Mirpur
Umpires: Ranmore Martinesz (SL) and Masudur Rahman (Ban)

- Rajshahi Kings won the toss and elected to field.
- No play was possible due to heavy rain.
- The match was replayed on 30 November 2016.

4 November 2016
19:30 (D/N)

| Rangpur Riders | v | Khulna Titans |

Match abandoned
Sher-e-Bangla National Cricket Stadium, Mirpur
Umpires: Khalid Mahmood (Pak) and Nadir Shah (Ban)

- No toss.
- No play was possible due to heavy rain.
- The match was replayed on 10 November 2016.

5 November 2016
14:30

| Barisal Bulls | v | Chittagong Vikings |

Postponed
Sher-e-Bangla National Cricket Stadium, Mirpur
Umpires: Ranmore Martinesz (SL) and Masudur Rahman (Ban)

- The match was replayed on 14 November 2016.

5 November 2016
19:30 (D/N)

| Comilla Victorians | v | Dhaka Dynamites |

Postponed
Sher-e-Bangla National Cricket Stadium, Mirpur
Umpires: Khalid Mahmood (Pak) and Nadir Shah (Ban)

- The match was replayed on 14 November 2016.

6 November 2016
14:30

| Rangpur Riders | v | Rajshahi Kings |

Postponed
Sher-e-Bangla National Cricket Stadium, Mirpur

- The match was replayed on 28 November 2016.

6 November 2016
19:30 (D/N)

| Barisal Bulls | v | Khulna Titans |

Postponed
Sher-e-Bangla National Cricket Stadium, Mirpur

- The match was replayed on 20 November 2016.

=== Phase 1 ===
8 November 2016
14:00
Scorecard

| Chittagong Vikings; 161/3 (20 overs) | v | Comilla Victorians; 132/8 (20 overs) |
| Tamim Iqbal 54 (38); Imad Wasim 1/22 (4 overs) | | Nazmul Hossain 54* (44); Mohammad Nabi 4/24 (4 overs) |

Chittagong won by 29 runs
Sher-e-Bangla National Cricket Stadium, Mirpur
Umpires: Gazi Sohel (Ban) and Ranmore Martinesz (SL)
Player of the match: Mohammad Nabi (Chittagong Vikings)

- Comilla Victorians won the toss and elected to field.
- Zakir Hasan (Chittagong Vikings); Nahidul Islam and Nazmul Hossain Shanto (Comilla Victorians) all made their T20 debuts.

8 November 2016
19:00 (D/N)
Scorecard

| Barisal Bulls; 148/6 (20 overs) | v | Dhaka Dynamites; 149/2 (16 overs) |
| Shahriar Nafees 55 (34); Mohammad Shahid 3/21 (4 overs) | | Mehedi Maruf 75 (45); Taijul Islam 1/14(2 overs) |

Dhaka won by 8 wickets
Sher-e-Bangla National Cricket Stadium, Mirpur
Umpires: Khalid Mahmood (Pak) and Nadir Shah (Ban)
Player of the match: Mehedi Maruf (Dhaka Dynamites)

- Dhaka Dynamites won the toss and elected to field.
- Mahedi Hasan (Barisal Bulls) made his T20 debut.

9 November 2016
14:00
Scorecard

| Khulna Titans; 133/8 (20 overs) | v | Rajshahi Kings; 130 (20 overs) |
| Mahmudullah 32 (21); Abul Hasan 5/28 (4 overs) | | Mominul Haque 64 (57); Junaid Khan 4/23 (4 overs) |

Khulna won by 3 runs
Sher-e-Bangla National Cricket Stadium, Mirpur
Umpires: Ranmore Martinesz (SL) and Masudur Rahman (Ban)
Player of the match: Mahmudullah (Khulna Titans)

- Khulna Titans won the toss and elected to bat.
- Abdul Mazid (Khulna Titans) and Mehedi Hasan (Rajshahi Kings) both made their T20 debuts.

9 November 2016
19:00 (D/N)
Scorecard

| Chittagong Vikings; 124 (19.4 overs) | v | Rangpur Riders; 125/1 (15 overs) |
| Shoaib Malik 30(32); Sohag Gazi 2/18 (3 overs) | | Mohammad Shahzad 80 (52); Tymal Mills 1/30 (3 overs) |

Rangpur won by 9 wickets
Sher-e-Bangla National Cricket Stadium, Mirpur
Umpires: Khalid Mahmood (Pak) and Nadir Shah (Ban)
Player of the match: Mohammad Shahzad (Rangpur Riders)

- Rangpur Riders won the toss and elected to field.

10 November 2016
19:00 (D/N)
Scorecard

| Khulna Titans; 44 (10.4 overs) | v | Rangpur Riders; 45/1 (8 overs) |
| Shuvagata Hom 12 (8); Shahid Afridi 4/12 (3 overs) | | Mohammad Mithun 15* (15); Junaid Khan 1/14 (2 overs) |

Rangpur won by 9 wickets
Sher-e-Bangla National Cricket Stadium, Mirpur
Umpires: Mahfuzur Rahman (Ban) and Ranmore Martinesz (SL)
Player of the match: Shahid Afridi (Rangpur Riders)

- Rangpur Riders won the toss and elected to field.
- This was a replay of the match from 4 November 2016.
- Rangpur Riders recorded the biggest win in the BPL in terms of balls remaining and Khulna Titans made the lowest total in the BPL.

11 November 2016
14:30
Scorecard

| Comilla Victorians; 129/8 (20 overs) | v | Barisal Bulls; 130/4 (18.3 overs) |
| Marlon Samuels 48 (48); Abu Hider 2/34 (4 overs) | | Thisara Perera 34 (20); Nabil Samad 1/12 (3 overs) |

Barisal Bulls won by 6 wickets
Sher-e-Bangla National Cricket Stadium, Mirpur
Umpires: Ranmore Martinesz (SL) and Nadir Shah (Ban)
Player of the match: Thisara Perera (Barisal Bulls)

- Comilla Victorians won the toss and elected to bat.

11 November 2016
19:15 (D/N)
Scorecard

| Dhaka Dynamites; 138/5 (20 overs) | v | Rajshahi Kings; 139/4 (18.1 overs) |
| Mosaddek Hossain 59* (46); Samit Patel 2/20 (4 overs) | | Samit Patel 44* (25); Abu Jayed 1/14 (2 overs) |

Rajshahi won by 6 wickets
Sher-e-Bangla National Cricket Stadium, Mirpur
Umpires: Khalid Mahmood (Pak) and Mahfuzur Rahman (Ban)
Player of the match: Samit Patel (Rajshahi Kings)

- Rajshahi Kings won the toss and elected to field.

12 November 2016
14:00
Scorecard

| Khulna Titans; 127/7 (20 overs) | v | Chittagong Vikings; 123/9 (20 overs) |
| Nicholas Pooran 29 (30); Mohammad Nabi 3/22 (4 overs) | | Mohammad Nabi 39 (23); Shafiul Islam 4/28 (4 overs) |

Khulna won by 4 runs
Sher-e-Bangla National Cricket Stadium, Mirpur
Umpires: Mahfuzur Rahman (Ban) and Ranmore Martinesz (SL)
Player of the match: Mahmudullah (Khulna Titans)

- Chittagong Vikings won the toss and elected to field.
- Hasanuzzaman (Khulna Titans) made his T20 debut.

12 November 2016
19:00 (D/N)
Scorecard

| Dhaka Dynamites; 170/6 (20 overs) | v | Rangpur Riders; 92/9 (19.2 overs) |
| Mosaddek Hossain 48 (28); Shahid Afridi 2/22 (4 overs) | | Naeem Islam 29 (26); Shakib Al Hasan 2/17 (4 overs) |

Dhaka won by 78 runs
Sher-e-Bangla National Cricket Stadium, Mirpur
Umpires: Khalid Mahmood (Pak) and Nadir Shah (Ban)
Player of the match: Mosaddek Hossain (Dhaka Dynamites)

- Rangpur Riders won the toss and elected to field.

13 November 2016
14:00
Scorecard

| Barisal Bulls; 192/4 (20 overs) | v | Rajshahi Kings; 188/6 (20 overs) |
| Mushfiqur Rahim 81* (52); Farhad Reza 2/22 (4 overs) | | Sabbir Rahman 122 (61); Al Amin 3/35 (4 overs) |

Barisal Bulls won by 4 runs
Sher-e-Bangla National Cricket Stadium, Mirpur
Umpires: Anisur Rahman (Ban) and Khalid Mahmood (Pak)
Player of the match: Sabbir Rahman (Rajshahi Kings)

- Rajshahi Kings won the toss and elected to field.

13 November 2016
19:00 (D/N)
Scorecard

| Khulna Titans; 144/9 (20 overs) | v | Comilla Victorians; 131/9 (20 overs) |
| Hasanuzzaman 37 (30); Sohail Tanvir 3/17 (4 overs) | | Marlon Samuels 30 (34); Shafiul Islam 2/19 (4 overs) |

Khulna won by 13 runs
Sher-e-Bangla National Cricket Stadium, Mirpur
Umpires: Ranmore Martinesz (SL) and Sharfuddoula (Ban)
Player of the match: Shafiul Islam (Khulna Titans)

- Comilla Victorians won the toss and elected to field.
- Mohammad Saifuddin (Comilla Victorians) made his T20 debut.

14 November 2016
14:00
Scorecard

| Chittagong Vikings; 163/3 (20 overs) | v | Barisal Bulls; 167/3 (19.4 overs) |
| Tamim Iqbal 75 (51); Kamrul Islam 1/21 (4 overs) | | Dawid Malan 78 (48); Imran Khan Jr. 2/30 (4 overs) |

Barisal Bulls won by 7 wickets
Sher-e-Bangla National Cricket Stadium, Mirpur
Umpires: Khalid Mahmood (Pak) and Tanvir Ahmed (Ban)
Player of the match: Dawid Malan (Barisal Bulls)

- Barisal Bulls won the toss and elected to field.
- This was a replay of the match from 5 November 2016.

14 November 2016
19:00 (D/N)
Scorecard

| Dhaka Dynamites; 194/5 (20 overs) | v | Comilla Victorians; 161/9 (20 overs) |
| Mehedi Maruf 60 (39); Rashid Khan 3/28 (4 overs) | | Mashrafe Mortaza 47 (35); Mohammad Shahid 3/34 (4 overs) |

Dhaka won by 33 runs
Sher-e-Bangla National Cricket Stadium, Mirpur
Umpires: Ranmore Martinesz (SL) and Nadir Shah (Ban)
Player of the match: Mehedi Maruf (Dhaka Dynamites)

- Comilla Victorians won the toss and elected to field.
- This was a replay of the match from 5 November 2016.

=== Phase 2 ===
17 November 2016
13:00
Scorecard

| Dhaka Dynamites; 148/9 (20 overs) | v | Chittagong Vikings; 129/8 (20 overs) |
| Mosaddek Hossain 35 (26); Mohammad Nabi 3/18 (3 overs) | | Tamim Iqbal 26 (35); Mohammad Shahid 3/23 (4 overs) |

Dhaka won by 19 runs
Zohur Ahmed Chowdhury Stadium, Chittagong
Umpires: Ranmore Martinesz (SL) and Nadir Shah (Ban)
Player of the match: Mohammad Shahid (Dhaka Dynamites)

- Chittagong Vikings won the toss and elected to field.

17 November 2016
17:45 (D/N)
Scorecard

| Rangpur Riders; 175/6 (20 overs) | v | Barisal Bulls; 163 (19.4 overs) |
| Mohammad Mithun 62 (44); Taijul Islam 2/27 (4 overs) | | Jeevan Mendis 57 (53); Sohag Gazi 3/19 (3.4 overs) |

Rangpur won by 12 runs
Zohur Ahmed Chowdhury Stadium, Chittagong
Umpires: Khalid Mahmood (Pak) and Masudur Rahman (Ban)
Player of the match: Mohammad Mithun (Rangpur Riders)

- Barisal Bulls won the toss and elected to field.

18 November 2016
13:30
Scorecard

| Chittagong Vikings; 190/5 (20 overs) | v | Rajshahi Kings; 171/9 (20 overs) |
| Mohammad Nabi 87 (37); Samit Patel 2/21 (4 overs) | | Sabbir Rahman 46 (30); Taskin Ahmed 5/31 (4 overs) |

Chittagong won by 19 runs
Zohur Ahmed Chowdhury Stadium, Chittagong
Umpires: Khalid Mahmood (Pak) and Nadir Shah (Ban)
Player of the match: Mohammad Nabi (Chittagong Vikings)

- Rajshahi Kings won the toss and elected to field.

18 November 2016
18:15 (D/N)
Scorecard

| Comilla Victorians; 122/5 (20 overs) | v | Rangpur Riders; 126/1 (17 overs) |
| Ahmed Shehzad 52 (45); Rubel Hossain 2/27 (4 overs) | | Mohammad Shahzad 51 (49); Mashrafe Mortaza 1/20 (4 overs) |

Rangpur won by 9 wickets
Zohur Ahmed Chowdhury Stadium, Chittagong
Umpires: Tanvir Ahmed (Ban) and Ranmore Martinesz (SL)
Player of the match: Mohammad Shahzad (Rangpur Riders)

- Rangpur Riders won the toss and elected to field.

19 November 2016
13:00
Scorecard

| Khulna Titans; 157/5 (20 overs) | v | Dhaka Dynamites; 148 (19.1 overs) |
| Mahmudullah 62 (44); Dwayne Bravo 2/27 (4 overs) | | Seekkuge Prasanna 53 (22); Mosharraf Hossain 3/31 (4 overs) |

Khulna won by 9 runs
Zohur Ahmed Chowdhury Stadium, Chittagong
Umpires: Khalid Mahmood (Pak) and Masudur Rahman (Ban)
Player of the match: Mosharraf Hossain (Khulna Titans)

- Khulna Titans won the toss and elected to bat.

19 November 2016
17:45 (D/N)
Scorecard

| Comilla Victorians; 152/5 (20 overs) | v | Rajshahi Kings; 120 (19 overs) |
| Nazmul Hossain 41 (40); Darren Sammy 2/34 (4 overs) | | Mominul Haque 53 (43); Sohail Tanvir 4/18 (3 overs) |

Comilla won by 32 runs
Zohur Ahmed Chowdhury Stadium, Chittagong
Umpires: Ranmore Martinesz (SL) and Nadir Shah (Ban)
Player of the match: Sohail Tanvir (Comilla Victorians)

- Rajshahi Kings won the toss and elected to field.

20 November 2016
17:45 (D/N)
Scorecard

| Khulna Titans; 151/7 (20 overs) | v | Barisal Bulls; 129 (19.3 overs) |
| Mahmudullah 44 (26); Taijul Islam 3/18 (4 overs) | | Mushfiqur Rahim 35 (23); Shafiul Islam 4/17 (3.3 overs) |

Khulna won by 22 runs
Zohur Ahmed Chowdhury Stadium, Chittagong
Umpires: Ranmore Martinesz (SL) and Gazi Sohel (Ban)
Player of the match: Mahmudullah (Khulna Titans)

- Barisal Bulls won the toss and elected to field.
- This was a replay of the match from 6 November 2016.

21 November 2016
13:00
Scorecard

| Dhaka Dynamites; 182/4 (20 overs) | v | Rajshahi Kings; 184/7 (19.5 overs) |
| Kumar Sangakkara 66 (46); Farhad Reza 2/22 (3 overs) | | Samit Patel 75 (39); Dwayne Bravo 3/35 (4 overs) |

Rajshahi won by 3 wickets
Zohur Ahmed Chowdhury Stadium, Chittagong
Umpires: Ranmore Martinesz (SL) and Nadir Shah (Ban)
Player of the match: Samit Patel (Rajshahi Kings)

- Dhaka Dynamites won the toss and elected to bat.

21 November 2016
17:45 (D/N)
Scorecard

| Comilla Victorians; 183/3 (20 overs) | v | Chittagong Vikings; 186/4 (19.2 overs) |
| Khalid Latif 76 (53); Taskin Ahmed 1/44 (4 overs) | | Mohammad Nabi 46 (24); Ryan ten Doeschate 2/16 (2 overs) |

Chittagong won by 6 wickets
Zohur Ahmed Chowdhury Stadium, Chittagong
Umpires: Morshed Ali Khan (Ban) and Khalid Mahmood (Pak)
Player of the match: Mohammad Nabi (Chittagong Vikings)

- Comilla Victorians won the toss and elected to bat.
- Shahidul Islam (Chittagong Vikings) and Habibur Rahman (Comilla Victorians) both made their T20 debuts.

22 November 2016
13:00
Scorecard

| Khulna Titans; 125/7 (20 overs) | v | Rangpur Riders; 129/3 (19 overs) |
| Taibur Rahman 32 (37); Arafat Sunny 2/16 (4 overs) | | Mohammad Mithun 49 (41); Mahmudullah 1/14 (3 overs) |

Rangpur won by 7 wickets
Zohur Ahmed Chowdhury Stadium, Chittagong
Umpires: Morshed Ali Khan (Ban) and Khalid Mahmood (Pak)
Player of the match: Shahid Afridi (Rangpur Riders)

- Khulna Titans won the toss and elected to bat.

22 November 2016
17:45 (D/N)
Scorecard

| Chittagong Vikings; 185/5 (20 overs) | v | Barisal Bulls; 107 (18.4 overs) |
| Dwayne Smith 69 (49); Kamrul Islam 2/29 (4 overs) | | Mohammad Enamul 42 (37); Mohammad Nabi 3/16 (3 overs) |

Chittagong won by 78 runs
Zohur Ahmed Chowdhury Stadium, Chittagong
Umpires: Ranmore Martinesz (SL) and Gazi Sohel (Ban)
Player of the match: Shoaib Malik (Chittagong Vikings)

- Chittagong Vikings won the toss and elected to bat.
- Mohammad Enamul (Barisal Bulls) made his T20 debut.

=== Phase 3 ===
25 November 2016
13:30
Scorecard

| Rajshahi Kings; 162/5 (20 overs) | v | Rangpur Riders; 150/5 (20 overs) |
| Darren Sammy 44 (18); Liam Dawson 2/15 (3 overs) | | Mohammad Mithun 64 (36); Nazmul Islam 2/19 (4 overs) |

Rajshahi won by 12 runs
Sher-e-Bangla National Cricket Stadium, Mirpur
Umpires: Ranmore Martinesz (SL) and Sharfuddoula (Ban)
Player of the match: Darren Sammy (Rajshahi Kings)

- Rangpur Riders won the toss and elected to field.

25 November 2016
18:15 (D/N)
Scorecard

| Barisal Bulls; 119/5 (20 overs) | v | Khulna Titans; 120/4 (18.4 overs) |
| Mushfiqur Rahim 31 (26); Junaid Khan 1/12 (4 overs) | | Shuvagata Hom 40 (34); Rumman Raees 2/13 (4 overs) |

Khulna won by 6 wickets
Sher-e-Bangla National Cricket Stadium, Mirpur
Umpires: Khalid Mahmood (Pak) and Anisur Rahman (Ban)
Player of the match: Shuvagata Hom (Khulna Titans)

- Barisal Bulls won the toss and elected to bat.

26 November 2016
13:00
Scorecard

| Dhaka Dynamites; 170/4 (20 overs) | v | Comilla Victorians; 138/8 (20 overs) |
| Shakib Al Hasan 41 (26); Rashid Khan 2/26 (4 overs) | | Khalid Latif 38 (33); Dwayne Bravo 3/32 (4 overs) |

Dhaka won by 32 runs
Sher-e-Bangla National Cricket Stadium, Mirpur
Umpires: Khalid Mahmood (Pak) and Nadir Shah (Ban)
Player of the match: Shakib Al Hasan (Dhaka Dynamites)

- Dhaka Dynamites won the toss and elected to bat.

26 November 2016
17:45 (D/N)
Scorecard

| Rajshahi Kings; 154/8 (20 overs) | v | Khulna Titans; 145/6 (20 overs) |
| Darren Sammy 71 (34); Kevon Cooper 2/31 (4 overs) | | Riki Wessels 36 (32); Darren Sammy 1/8 (3 overs) |

Rajshahi won by 9 runs
Sher-e-Bangla National Cricket Stadium, Mirpur
Umpires: Mahfuzur Rahman (Ban) and Rashid Riaz (Pak)
Player of the match: Darren Sammy (Rajshahi Kings)

- Rajshahi Kings won the toss and elected to bat.

27 November 2016
13:00
Scorecard

| Barisal Bulls; 132/6 (20 overs) | v | Dhaka Dynamites; 135/6 (19.2 overs) |
| Mushfiqur Rahim 36 (30); Abu Jayed 1/12 (4 overs) | | Nasir Hossain 34 (29); Taijul Islam 2/19 (4 overs) |

Dhaka won by 4 wickets
Sher-e-Bangla National Cricket Stadium, Mirpur
Umpires: Khalid Mahmood (Pak) and Masudur Rahman (Ban)
Player of the match: Shakib Al Hasan (Dhaka Dynamites)

- Barisal Bulls won the toss and elected to bat.

27 November 2016
17:45 (D/N)
Scorecard

| Rangpur Riders; 124/6 (20 overs) | v | Chittagong Vikings; 128/1 (16 overs) |
| Soumya Sarkar 26 (21); Taskin Ahmed 2/25 (4 overs) | | Tamim Iqbal 62 (48); Shahid Afridi 1/25 (2 overs) |

Chittagong won by 9 wickets
Sher-e-Bangla National Cricket Stadium, Mirpur
Umpires: Ranmore Martinesz (SL) and Nadir Shah (Ban)
Player of the match: Tamim Iqbal (Chittagong Vikings)

- Rangpur Riders won the toss and elected to bat.

28 November 2016
17:45 (D/N)
Scorecard

| Rajshahi Kings; 128/7 (20 overs) | v | Rangpur Riders; 79 (17.4 overs) |
| Farhad Reza 44 (32); Arafat Sunny 3/31 (4 overs) | | Mohammad Mithun 20 (21); Nazmul Islam 3/8 (4 overs) |

Rajshahi won by 49 runs
Sher-e-Bangla National Cricket Stadium, Mirpur
Umpires: Rashid Riaz (Pak) and Gazi Sohel (Ban)
Player of the match: Mehedi Hasan (Rajshahi Kings)

- Rajshahi Kings won the toss and elected to bat.
- This was a replay of the match from 6 November 2016.

29 November 2016
13:00
Scorecard

| Barisal Bulls; 142/8 (20 overs) | v | Comilla Victorians; 145/2 (19 overs) |
| Mushfiqur Rahim 29 (23); Nabil Samad 3/17 (4 overs) | | Ahmed Shehzad 61 (56); Dawid Malan 1/8 (2 overs) |

Comilla won by 8 wickets
Sher-e-Bangla National Cricket Stadium, Mirpur
Umpires: Khalid Mahmood (Pak) and Mahfuzur Rahman (Ban)
Player of the match: Ahmed Shehzad (Comilla Victorians)

- Barisal Bulls won the toss and elected to bat.

29 November 2016
17:45 (D/N)
Scorecard

| Khulna Titans; 131/8 (20 overs) | v | Chittagong Vikings; 135/5 (18.4 overs) |
| Mahmudullah 42 (39); Imran Khan Jr. 2/16 (4 overs) | | Tamim Iqbal 66 (59); Shuvagata Hom 1/7 (1 over) |

Chittagong won by 5 wickets
Sher-e-Bangla National Cricket Stadium, Mirpur
Umpires: Ranmore Martinesz (SL) and Gazi Sohel (Ban)
Player of the match: Tamim Iqbal (Chittagong Vikings)

- Khulna Titans won the toss and elected to bat.

30 November 2016
13:00
Scorecard

| Dhaka Dynamites; 188/7 (20 overs) | v | Rangpur Riders; 146/8 (20 overs) |
| Evin Lewis 75 (34); Rubel Hossain 3/25 (4 overs) | | Ziaur Rahman 60 (43); Abu Jayed 3/20 (4 overs) |

Dhaka won by 42 runs
Sher-e-Bangla National Cricket Stadium, Mirpur
Umpires: Masudur Rahman (Ban) and Rashid Riaz (Pak)
Player of the match: Evin Lewis (Dhaka Dynamites)

- Dhaka Dynamites won the toss and elected to bat.
- As a result of this match, Dhaka Dynamites qualified

30 November 2016
17:45 (D/N)
Scorecard

| Rajshahi Kings; 124/7 (20 overs) | v | Comilla Victorians; 125/2 (18.4 overs) |
| James Franklin 44 (31); Mohammad Saifuddin 3/12 (3 overs) | | Marlon Samuels 55 (41); Farhad Reza 1/14 (4 overs) |

Comilla won by 8 wickets
Sher-e-Bangla National Cricket Stadium, Mirpur
Umpires: Khalid Mahmood (Pak) and Nadir Shah (Ban)
Player of the match: Mohammad Saifuddin (Comilla Victorians)

- Rajshahi Kings won the toss and elected to bat.
- This was a reply of the match from 4 November 2016.

1 December 2016
17:45 (D/N)
Scorecard

| Barisal Bulls; 161/4 (20 overs) | v | Rajshahi Kings; 144/7 (20 overs) |
| Dawid Malan 56 (33); Mohammad Sami 1/16 (4 overs) | | Samit Patel 62 (51); Rayad Emrit 3/27 (4 overs) |

Barisal Bulls won by 17 runs
Sher-e-Bangla National Cricket Stadium, Mirpur
Umpires: Ranmore Martinesz (SL) and Mahfuzur Rahman (Ban)
Player of the match: Rayad Emrit (Barisal Bulls)

- Rajshahi Kings won the toss and elected to field.

2 December 2016
13:30
Scorecard

| Khulna Titans; 141/6 (20 overs) | v | Comilla Victorians; 142/5 (18.4 overs) |
| Mahmudullah 40 (38); Mashrafe Mortaza 3/16 (4 overs) | | Marlon Samuels 69 (57); Benny Howell 2/25 (4 overs) |

Comilla won by 5 wickets
Sher-e-Bangla National Cricket Stadium, Mirpur
Umpires: Khalid Mahmood (Pak) and Mahfuzur Rahman (Ban)
Player of the match: Marlon Samuels (Comilla Victorians)

- Comilla Victorians won the toss and elected to field.

2 December 2016
18:15 (D/N)
Scorecard

| Chittagong Vikings; 134/6 (20 overs) | v | Dhaka Dynamites; 135/4 (18.2 overs) |
| Tamim Iqbal 74 (59); Dwayne Bravo 3/27 (4 overs) | | Kumar Sangakkara 35 (35); Mohammad Nabi 1/2 (2 overs) |

Dhaka won by 6 wickets
Sher-e-Bangla National Cricket Stadium, Mirpur
Umpires: Khalid Mahmood (Pak) and Masudur Rahman (Ban)
Player of the match: Dwayne Bravo (Dhaka Dynamites)

- Dhaka Dynamites won the toss and elected to field.

3 December 2016
13:00
Scorecard

| Rangpur Riders; 154/5 (20 overs) | v | Barisal Bulls; 125 (18.2 overs) |
| Mohammad Shahzad 48 (40); Thisara Perera 2/26 (4 overs) | | Dawid Malan 30 (23); Liam Dawson 2/11 (2 overs) |

Rangpur won by 29 runs
Sher-e-Bangla National Cricket Stadium, Mirpur
Umpires: Tanvir Ahmed (Ban) and Ranmore Martinesz (SL)
Player of the match: Mohammad Shahzad (Rangpur Riders)

- Rangpur Riders won the toss and elected to bat.

3 December 2016
17:45 (D/N)
Scorecard

| Chittagong Vikings; 111/9 (20 overs) | v | Rajshahi Kings; 112/4 (13.5 overs) |
| Shoaib Malik 67 (54); Afif Hossain 5/21 (4 overs) | | James Franklin 63 (27); Saqlain Sajib 2/9 (3 overs) |

Rajshahi won by 6 wickets
Sher-e-Bangla National Cricket Stadium, Mirpur
Umpires: Ranmore Martinesz (SL) and Nadir Shah (Ban)
Player of the match: Afif Hossain (Rajshahi Kings)

- Rajshahi Kings won the toss and elected to field.
- Afif Hossain (Rajshahi Kings) made his T20 debut.

4 December 2016
13:00
Scorecard

| Comilla Victorians; 170/6 (20 overs) | v | Rangpur Riders; 162/8 (20 overs) |
| Imrul Kayes 52 (35); Arafat Sunny 2/29 (3 overs) | | Mohammad Shahzad 45 (31); Rashid Khan 3/13 (4 overs) |

Comilla won by 8 runs
Sher-e-Bangla National Cricket Stadium, Mirpur
Umpires: Khalid Mahmood (Pak) and Nadir Shah (Ban)
Player of the match: Rashid Khan (Comilla Victorians)

- Rangpur Riders won the toss and elected to field.

4 December 2016
17:45 (D/N)
Scorecard

| Dhaka Dynamites; 158/7 (20 overs) | v | Khulna Titans; 159/4 (18 overs) |
| Kumar Sangakkara 59 (41); Junaid Khan 3/22 (4 overs) | | Mahmudullah 50 (28); Ravi Bopara 2/17 (3 overs) |

Khulna won by 6 wickets
Sher-e-Bangla National Cricket Stadium, Mirpur
Umpires: Morshed Ali Khan (Ban) and Ranmore Martinesz (SL)
Player of the match: Mahmudullah (Khulna Titans)

- Khulna Titans won the toss and elected to field.

== Playoffs ==
Semifinals
6 December 2016 — Sher-e-Bangla National Cricket Stadium, Dhaka
1 | Dhaka Dynamites | 140/8 (20 overs)
2 | Khulna Titans | 86 (16.2 overs)
6 December 2016 — Sher-e-Bangla National Cricket Stadium, Dhaka
3 | Chittagong Vikings | 142/8 (20 overs)
4 | Rajshahi Kings | 143/7 (18.3 overs)

Preliminary final
7 December 2016 — Sher-e-Bangla National Cricket Stadium, Dhaka
2 | Khulna Titans | 125/9 (20 overs)
4 | Rajshahi Kings | 129/3 (19.2 overs)

Final
9 December 2016 — Sher-e-Bangla National Cricket Stadium, Dhaka
1 | Dhaka Dynamites | 159/9 (20 overs)
4 | Rajshahi Kings | 103 (17.4 overs)

=== Eliminator ===
6 December 2016
13:00
Scorecard

| Chittagong Vikings; 142/8 (20 overs) | v | Rajshahi Kings; 143/7 (18.3 overs) |
| Tamim Iqbal 51 (46); Kesrick Williams 4/11 (4 overs) | | Darren Sammy 55 (27); Saqlain Sajib 2/24 (4 overs) |

Rajshahi won by 3 wickets
Sher-e-Bangla National Cricket Stadium, Dhaka
Umpires: Ranmore Martinesz (SL) and Masudur Rahman (Ban)
Player of the match: Darren Sammy (Rajshahi Kings)

- Rajshahi Kings won the toss and elected to field.
- Rajshahi Kings advanced to Qualifier 2 and Chittagong Vikings are eliminated

=== Qualifier 1 ===
6 December 2016
17:45 (D/N)
Scorecard

| Dhaka Dynamites; 140/8 (20 overs) | v | Khulna Titans; 86 (16.2 overs) |
| Andre Russell 46 (25); Junaid Khan 4/24 (4 overs) | | Andre Fletcher 28 (22); Dwayne Bravo 3/10 (2.2 overs) |

Dhaka won by 54 runs
Sher-e-Bangla National Cricket Stadium, Dhaka
Umpires: Khalid Mahmood (Pak) and Nadir Shah (Ban)
Player of the match: Andre Russell (Dhaka Dynamites)

- Khulna Titans won the toss and elected to field.
- Dhaka Dynamites advanced to Final and Khulna Titans goes to Qualifier 2

=== Qualifier 2 ===
7 December 2016
17:45 (D/N)
Scorecard

| Khulna Titans; 125/9 (20 overs) | v | Rajshahi Kings; 129/3 (19.2 overs) |
| Ariful Haque 32 (29); Samit Patel 3/19 (4 overs) | | Sabbir Rahman 43* (52); Mahmudullah 1/10 (1.2 overs) |

Rajshahi won by 7 wickets
Sher-e-Bangla National Cricket Stadium, Dhaka
Umpires: Ranmore Martinesz (SL) and Masudur Rahman (Ban)
Player of the match: Samit Patel (Rajshahi Kings)

- Khulna Titans won the toss and elected to bat.
- Rajshahi Kings advanced to the Final and Khulna Titans were eliminated

=== Final ===
9 December 2016
17:45 (D/N)
Scorecard

| Dhaka Dynamites; 159/9 (20 overs) | v | Rajshahi Kings; 103 (17.4 overs) |
| Evin Lewis 45 (31); Farhad Reza 3/28 (4 overs) | | Mominul Haque 27 (30); Abu Jayed 2/12 (3 overs) |

Dhaka won by 56 runs
Sher-e-Bangla National Cricket Stadium, Dhaka
Umpires: Khalid Mahmood (Pak) and Mahfuzur Rahman (Ban)
Player of the match: Kumar Sangakkara (Dhaka Dynamites)

- Rajshahi Kings won the toss and elected to field.
- Dhaka Dynamites won the championship and Rajshahi Kings became runners-up

== Statistics ==
=== Most runs ===
| Player | Team | Matches | Runs |
|---|---|---|---|
| Tamim Iqbal | Chittagong Vikings | 13 | 476 |
| Mahmudullah | Khulna Titans | 14 | 396 |
| Sabbir Rahman | Rajshahi Kings | 15 | 377 |
| Mohammad Shahzad | Rangpur Riders | 11 | 350 |
| Mushfiqur Rahim | Barisal Bulls | 12 | 341 |

- Source: Cricinfo.com

=== Most wickets ===
| Player | Team | Matches | Wickets |
|---|---|---|---|
| Dwayne Bravo | Dhaka Dynamites | 13 | 21 |
| Junaid Khan | Khulna Titans | 14 | 20 |
| Mohammad Nabi | Chittagong Vikings | 13 | 19 |
| Shafiul Islam | Khulna Titans | 13 | 18 |
| Shahid Afridi | Rangpur Riders | 11 | 17 |

- Source: Cricinfo.com

=== Highest team totals ===
The following table lists the three highest team scores during the season.

| Team | Total | Opponent | Ground |
|---|---|---|---|
| Dhaka Dynamites | 194/5 (20 overs) | Comilla Victorians | Sher-e-Bangla Cricket Stadium |
| Barisal Bulls | 192/4 (20 overs) | Rajshahi Kings | Sher-e-Bangla Cricket Stadium |
| Chittagong Vikings | 190/5 (20 overs) | Rajshahi Kings | Zohur Ahmed Chowdhury Stadium |

- Source: Cricinfo.com

== See also ==
- Rajshahi Kings in 2016
- Khulna Titans in 2016
- Barisal Bulls in 2016
- Comilla Victorians in 2016
- Dhaka Dynamites in 2016
- Rangpur Riders in 2016
- Chittagong Vikings in 2016
