= Chittagong Vikings in 2016 =

Domestic cricket team

Chittagong Vikings
2016 Bangladesh Premier League season
- Coach: Mohammad Salahuddin
- Captain: Tamim Iqbal
- Ground(s): Zohur Ahmed Chowdhury Stadium (capacity: 22,000)
- Most runs: Tamim Iqbal
- Most wickets: Mohammad Nabi

The Chittagong Vikings are a franchise cricket team based in Chittagong, Bangladesh, which plays in the Bangladesh Premier League (BPL). They were one of seven teams that competed in the 2016-17 Bangladesh Premier League. Tamim Iqbal continued as the captain of the team, with a drastic change in the management. Due to failure in the previous season the contract of Marvan Atapattu was not renewed, and Mohammad Salahuddin was appointed as the coach. Chris Gayle, Dwayne Smith, Shoaib Malik and Grant Elliott were bought under the contract for the fourth season.

== Player draft ==
The 2016 BPL draft was held on 30 September. Prior to the draft, the seven clubs signed 38 foreign players to contracts and each existing franchise was able to retain two home-grown players from the 2015 season. A total 301 players participated in the draft, including 133 local and 168 foreign players. 85 players were selected in the draft.

=== Player Transfers ===
Prior to the 2016 draft, a number of high-profile players moved teams. These included transfers between competing teams and due to the suspension of the Chris Gayle from the Barisal Bulls to the Chittagong Vikings.

== Points table ==
Pos	Team	Pld	W	L	NR	Pts	NRR
1	Dhaka Dynamites (C)	12	8	4	0	16	0.912
2	Khulna Titans (3)	12	7	5	0	14	−0.215
3	Chittagong Vikings (4)	12	6	6	0	12	0.233
4	Rajshahi Kings (R)	12	6	6	0	12	0.208
5	Rangpur Riders	12	6	6	0	12	−0.106
6	Comilla Victorians	12	5	7	0	10	−0.345
7	Barisal Bulls	12	4	8	0	8	−0.688

Source: Cricinfo.com
- The top four teams qualified for playoffs
- advanced to the Qualifier
- advanced to the Eliminator

== Squad ==
Name	Nationality	Batting style	Bowling style	Year signed	Notes
Batsmen
Tamim Iqbal (C)	Bangladesh	Left-handed	Right-arm off break	2015	
Chris Gayle	West Indies	Left-handed	Right-arm off break	2016	
Chaturanga de Silva	Sri Lanka	Left-handed	Slow left-arm orthodox	2016	
All-rounders
Mohammad Nabi	Afghanistan	Right-handed	Right-arm Offbreak	2016	
Shoaib Malik	Pakistan	Left-handed	Right arm offbreak	2016	
Grant Elliott	New Zealand	Right-handed	Right-arm medium	2016	
Dwayne Smith	West Indies	Right-handed	Right-arm medium fast	2016	
Nazmul Hossain Milon	Bangladesh	Right-handed	Right-arm medium	2016	
Wicket-keepers
Anamul Haque	Bangladesh	Right-handed	–	2015	
Jahurul Islam	Bangladesh	Right-handed	Right arm off break	2016	
Zakir Hasan	Bangladesh	Left-handed	–	2016	
Bowlers
Imran Khan	Pakistan	Left hand bat	Left-arm fast medium	2016	
Taskin Ahmed	Bangladesh	Left hand bat	Right-arm fast	2015	
Subashis Roy	Bangladesh	Right-handed	Right-arm medium	2016	
Tymal Mills	England	Right-handed	Left arm fast	2016	
Shahidul Islam	Bangladesh	Right-handed	Right-arm medium	2016	
Abdur Razzak	Bangladesh	Left-handed	slow left-arm orthodox	2016	
Saqlain Sajib	Bangladesh	Right-handed	Slow left-arm orthodox	2016	
Jubair Hossain	Bangladesh	Right-handed	Right-arm legbreak	2016	

== Statistics ==
Most runs
Player	Innings	Runs
Tamim Iqbal	11	425
Anamul Haque	10	231
Mohammad Nabi	7	213

Most wickets
Player	Innings	Wickets
Mohammad Nabi	10	35
Taskin Ahmed	8	30
Imran Khan, Jr	7	27
