= Kayes (disambiguation) =

Kayes is a city in Mali.

Kayes may also refer to:

- Kayes Cercle, administrative region in Mali
- Kayes Region, region in Mali
- Kayes, Republic of the Congo, town in the Republic of the Congo
- Madingo Kayes, archaeological site in the Republic of the Congo
- Madingo-Kayes, town in the Republic of the Congo

See also:

- Kayes (surname)
