= Khulna Titans in 2016 =

Cricket team in Khulna, Bangladesh

Khulna Titans
2016 Bangladesh Premier League season
- Coach: Stuart Law
- Captain: Mahmudullah

The Khulna Titans are a franchise cricket team based in Khulna, Bangladesh, which plays in the Bangladesh Premier League (BPL). They are one of the seven teams that competed in the 2016 Bangladesh Premier League. The team was captained by Mahmudullah Riyad.

== Player draft ==
The 2016 BPL draft was held on 30 September. Prior to the draft, the seven clubs signed 38 foreign players to contracts and each existing franchise was able to retain two home-grown players from the 2015 season. A total 301 players participated in the draft, including 133 local and 168 foreign players. 85 players were selected in the draft.

=== Player transfers ===
Prior to the 2016 draft, a number of high-profile players moved teams. These included transfers between competing teams and due to the suspension of the Sylhet Super Stars and the introduction of two new teams, Khulna Titans and Rajshahi Kings. Transfers included the move of Barisal Bulls captain Mahmudullah Riyad to the Khulna Titans.

== Points table ==
Pos	Team	Pld	W	L	NR	Pts	NRR
1	Dhaka Dynamites (C)	12	8	4	0	16	0.912
2	Khulna Titans (3)	12	7	5	0	14	−0.215
3	Chittagong Vikings (4)	12	6	6	0	12	0.233
4	Rajshahi Kings (R)	12	6	6	0	12	0.208
5	Rangpur Riders	12	6	6	0	12	−0.106
6	Comilla Victorians	12	5	7	0	10	−0.345
7	Barisal Bulls	12	4	8	0	8	−0.688

Source: Cricinfo.com
- The top four teams qualified for playoffs
- advanced to the Qualifier
- advanced to the Eliminator

== Squad ==
Name	Nationality	Batting style	Bowling style	Notes
Batsmen
Lendl Simmons	West Indies	Right-handed	Right-arm medium-fast	Overseas
Alok Kapali	Bangladesh	Right-handed	Legbreak	
Ariful Haque	Bangladesh	Right-handed	Right-arm medium-fast	
Hasanuzzaman	Bangladesh	Right-handed	Right-arm fast-medium	
Abdul Mazid	Bangladesh	Right-handed	Right-arm off-break	
Noor Hossain	Bangladesh	Right-handed		
All-rounders
Mahmudullah Riyad	Bangladesh	Right-handed	Right-arm off-break	Captain
Mosharraf Hossain	Bangladesh	Left-handed	Slow left-arm orthodox	
Shuvagata Hom	Bangladesh	Right-handed	Right-arm off-break	
Taibur Rahman	Bangladesh	Left-handed	Slow left-arm orthodox	
Benny Howell	England	Right-handed	Right-arm medium-fast	Overseas
Kevon Cooper	West Indies	Right-handed	Right-arm medium	Overseas
Wicket-keepers
Riki Wessels	England	Right-handed	–	Overseas
Nicholas Pooran	West Indies	Left-handed	–	Overseas
Andre Fletcher	West Indies	Right-handed	–	Overseas
Bowlers
Shafiul Islam	Bangladesh	Right-handed	Right-arm fast-medium	
Ben Laughlin	Australia	Right-handed	Right-arm fast medium	Overseas
Junaid Khan	Pakistan	Right-handed	Left-arm fast	Overseas
Naeem Islam jnr	Bangladesh	Right-handed	Slow left-arm orthodox	
Mohammad Asghar	Pakistan	Right-handed	Slow left-arm orthodox	Overseas

- Source: CricInfo
