= Rajshahi Kings in 2016 =

Rajshahi Kings
2016 Bangladesh Premier League season
- Coach: Sarwar Imran
- Captain: Darren Sammy
- Ground(s): Shaheed Kamruzzaman Stadium

The Rajshahi Kings are a franchise cricket team based in Rajshahi, Bangladesh, which plays in the Bangladesh Premier League (BPL). They are one of the seven teams that competed in the 2016 Bangladesh Premier League. The team was being captained by Darren Sammy.

== Player draft ==
The 2016 BPL draft was held on 30 September. Prior to the draft, the seven clubs signed 38 foreign players to contracts and each existing franchise was able to retain two home-grown players from the 2015 season. A total 301 players participated in the draft, including 133 local and 168 foreign players. 85 players were selected in the draft.

=== Player transfers ===
Prior to the 2016 draft, a number of high-profile players moved teams. These included transfers between competing teams and due to the suspension of the Sylhet Super Stars and the introduction of two new teams, Khulna Titans and Rajshahi Kings.

== Points table ==
Pos	Team	Pld	W	L	NR	Pts	NRR
1	Dhaka Dynamites (C)	12	8	4	0	16	0.912
2	Khulna Titans (3)	12	7	5	0	14	−0.215
3	Chittagong Vikings (4)	12	6	6	0	12	0.233
4	Rajshahi Kings (R)	12	6	6	0	12	0.208
5	Rangpur Riders	12	6	6	0	12	−0.106
6	Comilla Victorians	12	5	7	0	10	−0.345
7	Barisal Bulls	12	4	8	0	8	−0.688

Source: Cricinfo.com
- The top four teams qualified for playoffs
- advanced to the Qualifier
- advanced to the Eliminator

== Squad ==
Name	Nationality	Batting style	Bowling style	Notes
Batsmen
Upul Tharanga	Sri Lanka	Left-handed	–	
Sabbir Rahman	Bangladesh	Right-handed	Legbreak	
Mominul Haque	Bangladesh	Left-handed	Slow left-arm orthodox	
Raqibul Hasan	Bangladesh	Right-handed	Right-arm leg break	
Rony Talukdar	Bangladesh	Right-handed	Right-arm slow-medium	
Salman Hossain	Bangladesh	Right-handed	Right-arm fast-medium	
All-rounders
Darren Sammy	West Indies	Right-handed	Right-arm medium-fast	Captain
Milinda Siriwardana	Sri Lanka	Left-handed	Slow left-arm orthodox	
James Franklin	New Zealand	Left-handed	Left-arm medium	
Farhad Reza	Bangladesh	Right-handed	Right-arm medium-fast	
Mehidy Hasan Miraz	Bangladesh	Right-handed	Right-arm offbreak	
Afif Hossain	Bangladesh	Left-handed	Right-arm offbreak	
Samit Patel	England	Right-handed	Slow left-arm orthodox	
Wicket-keepers
Nurul Hasan	Bangladesh	Right-handed	–	
Umar Akmal	Pakistan	Right-handed	–	
Bowlers
Mohammad Sami	Pakistan	Right-handed	Right-arm fast	
Kesrick Williams	West Indies	Left-handed	Right-arm fast medium	
Abul Hasan	Bangladesh	Right-handed	Right-arm medium-fast	
Nazmul Islam Opu	Bangladesh	Left-handed	slow left arm orthodox	
