= 2016 Rangpur Riders season =

Rangpur Riders
2016 Bangladesh Premier League season
- Coach: Javed Omar
- Captain: Naeem Islam
- Ground(s): Rangpur Stadium, Rangpur Cricket Garden

The Rangpur Riders are a franchise cricket team based in Rangpur, Bangladesh, which plays in the Bangladesh Premier League (BPL). Captained by Naeem Islam, they were one of seven teams that competed in the 2016 Bangladesh Premier League.

Prior to the season, the ownership of the Riders was transferred to Sohana Sports. The team rearranged its playing squad with Shahid Afridi, Soumya Sarkar, Mohammad Shehzad, and many other acclaimed cricketers. Shakib Al Hasan, the icon player from the previous edition, was transferred to Dhaka Dynamites. The club made headlines with the acquisition of Shane Watson, David Miller, and Anwar Ali.

The Riders started the season strong with a dominating victory against the Chittagong Vikings, winning the match by 9 wickets, with Mohammad Shehzad scoring 80 runs. The team continued its domination during its second game, getting Khulna Titans all out for 44, the lowest ever total in the Bangladesh Premier League.

== Player draft ==
The 2016 BPL draft was held on 30 September. Prior to the draft, the seven clubs signed 38 foreign players to contracts, and each existing franchise was able to retain two home-grown players from the 2015 season. A total of 301 players participated in the draft, including 133 local and 168 foreign players. 85 players were selected in the draft.

=== Player transfers ===
Prior to the 2016 draft, a number of high-profile players moved teams. These included transfers between competing teams and due to the suspension of the signing of Shahid Afridi as team captain of Rangpur Riders from the Sylhet Super Stars and Shakib Al Hasan as team captain of Dhaka Dynamites from Rangpur Riders.

== Points table ==
Pos	Team	Pld	W	L	NR	Pts	NRR
1	Dhaka Dynamites (C)	12	8	4	0	16	0.912
2	Khulna Titans (3)	12	7	5	0	14	−0.215
3	Chittagong Vikings (4)	12	6	6	0	12	0.233
4	Rajshahi Kings (R)	12	6	6	0	12	0.208
5	Rangpur Riders	12	6	6	0	12	−0.106
6	Comilla Victorians	12	5	7	0	10	−0.345
7	Barisal Bulls	12	4	8	0	8	−0.688

Source: Cricinfo.com
- The top four teams qualified for playoffs
- advanced to the Qualifier
- advanced to the Eliminator

== Squad ==
Name	Nationality	Batting style	Bowling style	Year signed	Notes
Batsmen
Soumya Sarkar	Bangladesh	Left-handed	Right arm medium-fast	2015	
Sharjeel Khan	Pakistan	Left-handed	Right-arm leg spin	2016	
Babar Azam	Pakistan	Right-handed	Right-arm off break	2016	
Pinak Ghosh	Bangladesh	Left-handed	–	2016	
Gidron Pope	West Indies	Left-handed	Right-arm off-spin	2016	
Gihan Rupasinghe	Sri Lanka	Left-handed	Right-arm leg break	2016	
All-rounders
Shahid Afridi	Pakistan	Right-handed	Right-arm leg break	2016	
Anwar Ali	Pakistan	Right-hand	Right-arm fast medium	2016	
Dasun Shanaka	Sri Lanka	Right-handed	Right-arm medium	2016	
Ziaur Rahman	Bangladesh	Left-handed	Right-arm medium	2016	
Naeem Islam	Bangladesh	Right-handed	Right-arm off break	2016	Captain
Sohag Gazi	Bangladesh	Right-handed	Right-arm off break	2016	
Muktar Ali	Bangladesh	Right-handed	Right arm medium-fast	2015	
Liam Dawson	England	Right-handed	Slow Left-arm orthodox	2016	
Shane Watson	Australia	Right-handed	Right-arm fast medium	2016	
Wicket-keepers
Mithun Ali	Bangladesh	Right-handed	–	2015	Opener
Mohammad Shehzad	Afghanistan	Right-handed	–	2016	Opener
Bowlers
Sachithra Senanayake	Sri Lanka	Right-handed	Right arm off spin	2015	
Rubel Hossain	Bangladesh	Right-handed	Right-arm fast	2016	
Arafat Sunny	Bangladesh	Left-handed	Slow Left-arm orthodox	2015	
Elias Sunny	Bangladesh	Left-handed	Slow Left-arm orthodox	2015	
Mehrab Hossain	Bangladesh	Right-handed bat	Right-arm medium	2016	
Shahbaz Chouhan	Bangladesh	Right-handed	Slow Left-arm orthodox	2016	
Richard Gleeson	England	Right-handed	Right-arm fast-medium	2016	
