= Tchibota =

Village in the Republic of the Congo

Tchibota French: Tchibota
- Village
- Location within Republic of the Congo
- Coordinates: 4°10′46″S 11°22′23″E
- Country: Republic of the Congo
- Départements: Kouilou
- District: Madingo-Kayes

Population
  - Total: 262,931 (7 km radius)
- Time zone: UTC+1 (WAT)

Tchibota is a village in Kouilou, Republic of the Congo. The Vili people have a surname with the name Tchibota which originates from this town. The population of the village and surrounding villages is 262,931.
