= Kayes (surname) =

Kayes is a surname. Notable people with the surname include:

- Imrul Kayes, Bangladeshi cricketer
- Joe Kayes (born 1991), New Zealand-born Australian water polo player
- Kerry Kayes (born 1950), British bodybuilder
- Nicola Kayes, New Zealand health psychologist

See also: Kayes (disambiguation)
