= Barisal Bulls in 2016 =

Bangladeshi cricket team

Barisal Bulls
2016 Bangladesh Premier League season
- Coach: Dav Whatmore
- Captain: Mushfiqur Rahim
- Ground(s): Abdur Rab Serniabad Stadium

The Barisal Bulls were a franchise cricket team based in Barisal, Bangladesh, which played in the Bangladesh Premier League (BPL). They were one of the seven teams that competed in the 2016 Bangladesh Premier League. The team was captained by Mushfiqur Rahim. The 2016 season was the team's last season until it was re-established in 2021 with the name Fortune Barishal and with new owners.

== Player draft ==
The 2016 BPL draft was held on 30 September. Prior to the draft, the seven clubs signed 38 foreign players to contracts and each existing franchise was able to retain two home-grown players from the 2015 season. A total 301 players participated in the draft, including 133 local and 168 foreign players. 85 players were selected in the draft.

== Points table ==
Pos	Team	Pld	W	L	NR	Pts	NRR
1	Dhaka Dynamites (C)	12	8	4	0	16	0.912
2	Khulna Titans (3)	12	7	5	0	14	−0.215
3	Chittagong Vikings (4)	12	6	6	0	12	0.233
4	Rajshahi Kings (R)	12	6	6	0	12	0.208
5	Rangpur Riders	12	6	6	0	12	−0.106
6	Comilla Victorians	12	5	7	0	10	−0.345
7	Barisal Bulls	12	4	8	0	8	−0.688

Source: Cricinfo.com
- The top four teams qualified for playoffs
- advanced to the Qualifier
- advanced to the Eliminator

== Squad ==
Name	Nationality	Batting style	Bowling style	Notes
Batsmen
Shamsur Rahman	Bangladesh	Right-handed	Right-arm off break	
Dilshan Munaweera	Sri Lanka	Right-handed	Right-arm off break	Overseas
Shahriar Nafees	Bangladesh	Left-handed	–	
Dawid Malan	England	Left-handed	Right-arm leg break	Overseas
Josh Cobb	England	Right-handed	Right-arm off break	Overseas
Nadif Chowdhury	Bangladesh	Right-handed	Slow left-arm orthodox	
All-rounders
Jeevan Mendis	Sri Lanka	Left-handed	Leg break	
Mohammad Nawaz	Pakistan	Left-handed	Slow left arm orthodox	
Carlos Brathwaite	West Indies	Right-handed	Right arm Medium	Overseas
Mahedi Hasan	Bangladesh	Right-handed	Right-arm off break	
Thisara Perera	Sri Lanka	Left-handed	Right-arm medium fast	Overseas
Fazle Mahmud	Bangladesh	Left-handed	Slow left-arm orthodox	
Wicket-keepers
Mushfiqur Rahim	Bangladesh	Right-handed	–	
Dhiman Ghosh	Bangladesh	Right-handed	–	
Bowlers
Rayad Emrit	West Indies	Right-handed	Right-arm medium-fast	Overseas
Rumman Raees	Pakistan	Right-handed	Left-arm fast	Overseas
Abu Hider	Bangladesh	Right-handed	Right-arm medium-fast	
Al-Amin Hossain	Bangladesh	Right-handed	Right-arm medium-fast	
Kamrul Islam Rabbi	Bangladesh	Right-handed	Right-arm medium-fast	
Taijul Islam	Bangladesh	Left-handed	Slow left-arm orthodox	
Monir Hossain	Bangladesh	Right-handed	Slow left arm off-break	
