= Nafisa Kamal =

Bangladeshi businessperson and cricket franchise owner

- Born: 21 April 1982 (age 44); Dhaka, Bangladesh
- Education: Massachusetts Institute of Technology; Northwestern University; Edexcel
- Occupation: Businesswoman
- Known for: Owner of the Comilla Victorians
- Parents: Mustafa Kamal (father); Kashmiri Kamal (mother)
- Relatives: Kashfi Kamal (sister)

Nafisa Kamal (Bengali: নাফিসা কামাল, romanized: Nafisa Kamaal; born 1982) is a Bangladeshi businesswoman and cricket franchise owner. Kamal is an avid cricket patron and is the owner of the Comilla Victorians, one of the most successful cricket teams in Bangladesh. She is the first woman in Bangladeshi history to own a cricket franchise.

== Early life ==
When Kamal was a child, her father, Mustafa Kamal, took her to cricket matches regularly. He would take Kamal out of school to attend matches, traveling internationally for tournaments.

== Career ==
Nafisa Kamal is the first - and only - woman in Bangladesh to have ever operated a cricket team. She first owned the Sylhet Royals. As of 2024, she is the owner of the Comilla Victorians, the team that represents Comilla, a city in Bangladesh.

In 2017, Kamal said Comilla would build a stadium in Comilla. The stadium has yet to be built.

Under Kamal's leadership, Comilla uses a revenue sharing model regarding player salaries, which is industry standard internationally in cricket, except in Bangladesh. Sponsorship is the core source of revenue for the team.

Kamal has expressed concerns over Bangladesh Premier League (BPL) tournament rules and procedures, including rematch rules and player contracts, especially over the signing of Mushfiqur Rahim. In 2019, she said Comilla would leave the BPL, over issues of contract negotiations and finances. She expressed anger towards the BPL excluding cricket franchises from participating in the League. Comilla's contract with BPL included revenue sharing, foreign player signings, and no auction. Kamal supports the abandonment of the franchise system.

=== Sexism and privilege in cricket ===
In a 2015 interview, Kamal shared that she has experienced discrimination given the fact her father is a notable person in cricket. "I think it's pretty impossible for me to make a name as an individual as I have to carry my father's legacy," she said. Kamal also recognizes the social privilege she has being Mustafa Kamal's daughter in a sport that he has major influence in.

Regarding sexism, Kamal has not experienced any, but she is despondent over being the only woman in leadership in cricket, saying "[I] try to make the most of it but it's still a sad reality here - that being the only female cricket organiser in cricket so far, it's quite difficult." She has expressed interest in working in Bangladesh women's cricket. Kamal is an advocate for gender equality.
