= Madingo-Kayes District =

Coordinates: 4.434°S 11.702°E

Madingo-Kayes
- District
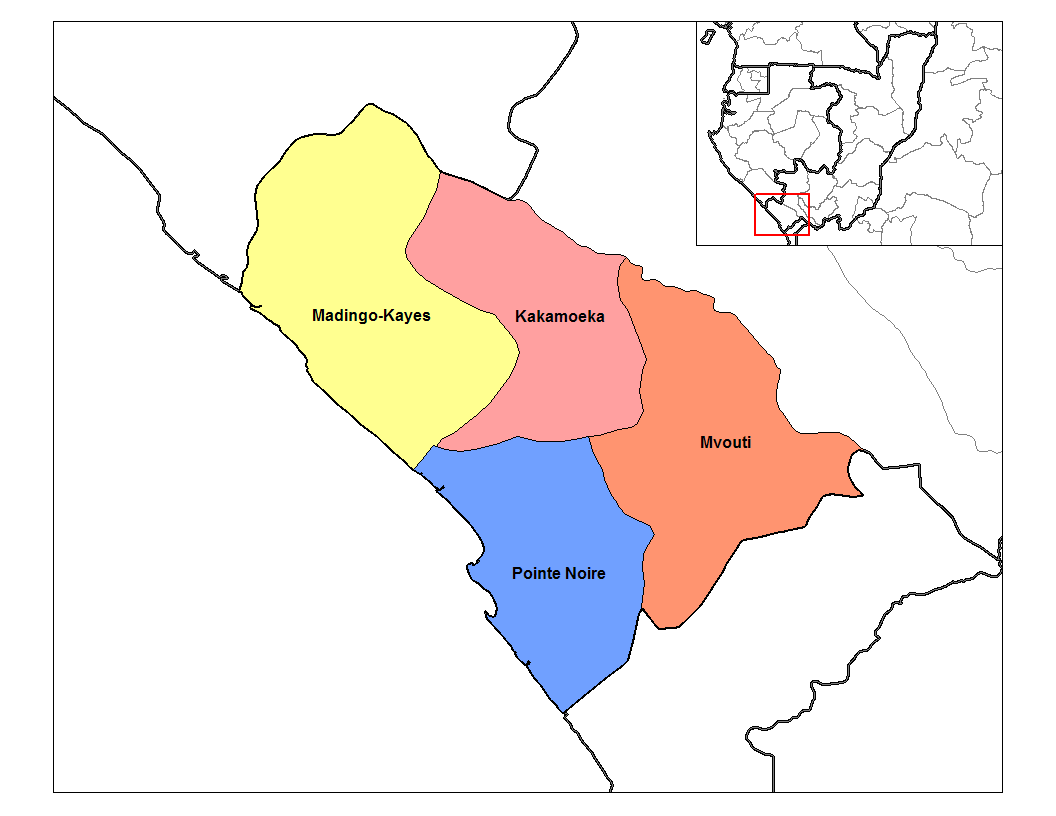
- Madingo-Kayes District in the department
- Country: Republic of the Congo
- Department: Kouilou Department

Area
  - Total: 1,114 sq mi (2,886 km^{2})

Population (2023 census)
  - Total: 8,574
  - Density: 7.695/sq mi (2.971/km^{2})
- Time zone: UTC+1 (GMT +1)

Madingo-Kayes is a district in the Kouilou Department of far south-western Republic of the Congo. The capital lies at Madingo-Kayes.

The area is known for its archaeological site Madingo Kayes.
