= Khalid Mahmood (umpire) =

Pakistani cricket umpire (born 1969)

Khalid Mehmood
Personal information
- Born: 6 February 1969 (age 57)

Umpiring information
- WODIs umpired: 7 (2004–2017)
- WT20Is umpired: 9 (2015–2019)
- Source: ESPNcricinfo, 21 April 2016

Khalid Mehmood (born 6 February 1969) is a Pakistani cricket umpire. He has officiated in matches in several domestic tournaments in Pakistan, including the 2015–16 Quaid-e-Azam Trophy and the 2015–16 Haier T20 Cup. He has also stood in Women's One Day International cricket matches. Outside of Pakistan he has umpired in matches in the 2016–17 Bangladesh Premier League.

In December 2017, he was one of the on-field umpires for the final of the 2017–18 Quaid-e-Azam Trophy.
