= Nahidul Islam =

Bangladeshi cricketer (born 1993)

Personal information
- Born: 19 July 1993 (age 33); Khulna, Bangladesh
- Batting: Right-handed
- Bowling: Right-arm off-break
- Role: All-rounder

Domestic team information
- Years: Team
- 2014-present: Khulna Division

Career statistics
Competition	FC	LA	T20
Matches	58	117	105
Runs scored	1,918	1,768	693
Batting average	25.23	22.37	13.86
100s/50s	2/7	0/8	0/1
Top score	175	92	58
Balls bowled	6,630	5,029	1,764
Wickets	86	101	73
Bowling average	34.26	35.94	26.43
5 wickets in innings	3	0	0
10 wickets in match	1	0	0
Best bowling	5/29	3/37	4/6
Catches/stumpings	37/–	54/–	42/–
- Source: ESPNcricinfo, 10 October 2025

Nahidul Islam (born 19 July 1993) is a Bangladeshi cricketer who plays for Khulna Division. He made his Twenty20 (T20) debut on 8 November 2016 playing for Comilla Victorians in the 2016–17 Bangladesh Premier League.

In October 2018, he was named in the squad for the Rangpur Riders team, following the draft for the 2018–19 Bangladesh Premier League. In November 2019, he was selected to play for the Rajshahi Royals in the 2019–20 Bangladesh Premier League. In November 2021, in the 2021–22 National Cricket League, he scored his maiden century in first-class cricket.
