= Madingo Kayes =

Archaeological site in Republic of the Congo

Madingo Kayes is an archaeological site in modern-day Republic of Congo, lying close to the town of Madingo-Kayes. It is the site of one of the earliest documented complex societies in West Central Africa. Excavations conducted by James Denbow in the 1990s established a two order settlement pattern dated to the early centuries CE by Carbon-14 method. At least three sites of differing sizes were found, although their connections and the existence of any sort of settlement or economic hierarchy have not yet been established.
