= Mohammad Salahuddin =

Bangladeshi cricket coach

Personal information
- Born: 15 November 1974 (age 51); Bangladesh
- Role: Coach, former cricketer

Domestic team information
- Years: Team
- 1990s: Biman Bangladesh Airlines
- Early 2000s: Dhaka Division

Head coaching information
- Years: Team
- 2013: Sylhet Royals
- 2015: Comilla Victorians
- 2016: Chittagong Vikings
- 2017–2019: Comilla Victorians
- 2019–2020: Dhaka Platoon
- 2022–2024: Comilla Victorians

Mohammad Salahuddin (born 15 November 1974) is a Bangladeshi cricket coach and current senior assistant coach of the Bangladesh national cricket team. Formerly, he has been the assistant coach of the Bangladesh and Singapore national cricket teams. A graduate of Jahangirnagar University, he played domestic cricket for six years until injury ended his career and he became a part-time coach in 1997.

== Coaching career ==
After a number of successes he joined the international side as a fielding coach in 2005 until leaving in 2010 to work in Malaysia as a university team coach. He is a former coach of the Bangladesh Premier League side Comilla Victorians and led them to their victory in 2015–16 Bangladesh Premier League, and also coached then Sylhet Royals to the race to the final stage of the 2013 BPL. He also coached Chittagong Vikings in 2016, helping them on their way to the eliminator. Several Bangladeshi cricketers consider him a mentor including Shakib Al Hasan, Tamim Iqbal, Mushfiqur Rahim and Mominul Haque. He was selected as the head coach again for Comilla Victorians in 2021–22 Bangladesh Premier League. In November 2024, he was selected as the senior assistant coach of the Bangladesh men's national team.
