= Madingo-Kayes =

- Location in the Republic of the Congo
- Coordinates: 4°25′52″S 11°42′7″E
- Country: Republic of the Congo
- Department: Kouilou
- District: Madingo-Kayes

Madingo-Kayes is a town lying on the edge of the coastal rainforest at the mouth of the Kouilou River on the Atlantic Ocean of the Republic of the Congo. It is the capitale of Madingo-Kayes District.
