= Mosharraf Hossain (cricketer) =

Bangladeshi cricketer (1981–2022)

Personal information
- Full name: Khondaker Mosharraf Hossain
- Born: 20 November 1981; Dhaka, Bangladesh
- Died: 19 April 2022 (aged 40); Gulshan, Dhaka, Bangladesh
- Nickname: Rubel
- Height: 6 ft 1 in (1.85 m)
- Batting: Left-handed
- Bowling: Slow left arm orthodox
- Role: Bowling all-rounder

International information
- National side: Bangladesh
- ODI debut (cap 88): 9 March 2008 v South Africa
- Last ODI: 7 October 2016 v England
- ODI shirt no.: 70

Domestic team information
- Years: Team
- 2001/02–2018/19: Dhaka Division
- 2004/05: Barisal Division
- 2012–2013: Dhaka Gladiators
- 2015: Dhaka Dynamites
- 2016–2017: Khulna Titans
- 2019: Comilla Victorians

Career statistics
Competition	ODI	FC	LA	T20
Matches	5	112	104	56
Runs scored	25	3,305	1,792	62
Batting average	6.50	23.94	24.88	6.20
100s/50s	0/0	2/16	0/8	0/0
Top score	8	125*	88	17
Balls bowled	198	25,339	5,123	1,105
Wickets	4	392	120	60
Bowling average	36.75	29.03	30.48	19.60
5 wickets in innings	0	19	1	0
10 wickets in match	0	3	0	0
Best bowling	3/24	9/105	5/57	4/9
Catches/stumpings	0/–	49/–	27/–	8/–
- Source: ESPNcricinfo, 15 March 2022

Khondaker Mosharraf Hossain (20 November 1981 – 19 April 2022), nicknamed Rubel, was a Bangladeshi cricketer. He was a left-handed batsman and slow left arm orthodox bowler. He had played five One Day International (ODI) matches for Bangladesh.

== Career ==
After making his debut in 2001–02, he appeared for Dhaka Division up to the end of the 2006–07 season with a season for Barisal Division in 2004–05. He represented Bangladesh A in 2005–06 and 2006–07. He was a regular face in the first class cricket, where he picked up 392 wickets at an average of 29.02 in 112 matches.

He took three five wicket hauls in first-class cricket, with a best of 9–105 against Chittagong Division in an innings where he also took 10 wickets in that match. He's also made three first-class fifties, with a top score of 85 against Chittagong Division.

On 9 March 2008, he made his debut in One Day International (ODI) against South Africa. On 1 October 2016, against Afghanistan, he made his comeback in the national side when he played his second ODI match after a nearly eight-year gap, since his debut in 2008 against South Africa.

In October 2018, he was named in the squad for the Comilla Victorians team, following the draft for the 2018–19 Bangladesh Premier League.

== Illness and premature death ==
In March 2019, Mosharraf was diagnosed with a brain tumour. Later, He returned to cricket after going through a brain surgery from Mount Elizabeth Hospital in Singapore. However, in November 2021, he went through another brain surgery from a hospital in Chennai. Hossain was receiving chemotherapy regularly but as his health suddenly deteriorated, he was admitted to the intensive care unit (ICU) of United Hospital in Dhaka. On 15 March 2022, he was admitted to the ICU of Square Hospital. On 19 April 2022, he died after suffering from the prolonged brain tumor.
