= Nadir Shah (umpire) =

Bangladeshi cricket umpire (1964–2021)

Personal information
- Born: 7 February 1964; Dhaka, East Pakistan
- Died: 10 September 2021 (aged 57)
- Relatives: Jahangir Shah (brother)

Umpiring information
- ODIs umpired: 40 (2006–2011)
- T20Is umpired: 3 (2006–2011)
- Source: CricketArchive, 10 September 2021

Nadir Shah (7 February 1964 – 10 September 2021) was an international cricket umpire from Bangladesh. He stood in international matches between 2006 and 2011. He was caught in a sting operation and initially banned for ten years for corruption. The ban was lifted after six years, and he resumed umpiring in domestic cricket in Bangladesh. He died of cancer in September 2021.

== Life and career ==
Nadir Shah was born on 7 February 1964 in Dhaka, Bangladesh. He was the youngest of seven brothers, and developed a passion for cricket from a young age. One of his older brothers, Jahangir Shah played for the Bangladesh national cricket team. Nadir, along with some of his other brothers, played in the Dhaka League for a variety of teams. He was described in his obituary in The Daily Star as "a leg-spinner and handy batsman". He started umpiring in the 1990s, and worked as a scout for Bangladesh during the 1997 ICC Trophy. He made his international umpiring debut in a One Day International (ODI) between Bangladesh and Kenya at Bogra in March 2006.

He predominantly stood in matches in Bangladesh, but also umpired during the 2007 ICC World Cricket League Division One in Kenya and the Kenyan tour of Zimbabwe in 2009–10. He acted as a TV umpire for six Test matches. Shah was well-regarded and known to give technical tips to players who were struggling. During his career as an international umpire, he officiated in 6 Tests, 63 ODIs and 3 T20I matches. The last time he supervised a match was in October 2019 at the National Cricket League.

In October 2012 he was caught in a TV sting operation appearing to agree to give decisions in exchange for money as an umpire during the 2012 ICC World Twenty20. He denied the allegations. In March 2013 he was banned for ten years by the Bangladesh Cricket Board (BCB). In February 2016 the BCB lifted the ban on Shah and he was eligible to umpire in domestic matches in Bangladesh. He continued to umpire until October 2019.

He died on 10 September 2021 from cancer at the age of 57.

== See also ==
- List of One Day International cricket umpires
- List of Twenty20 International cricket umpires
