= Nazmul Islam =

Bangladeshi cricketer

Personal information
- Full name: Mohammad Nazmul Islam
- Born: 21 March 1992 (age 34); Dhaka, Bangladesh
- Nickname: Apu
- Batting: Left-handed
- Bowling: Slow left-arm orthodox
- Role: Bowler

International information
- National side: Bangladesh (2018)
- Only Test (cap 90): 3 November 2018 v Zimbabwe
- ODI debut (cap 128): 23 September 2018 v Afghanistan
- Last ODI: 26 October 2018 v Zimbabwe
- ODI shirt no.: 23
- T20I debut (cap 60): 15 February 2018 v Sri Lanka
- Last T20I: 5 August 2018 v West Indies

Domestic team information
- Years: Team
- 2009/10–present: Dhaka Division
- 2010/11: Chittagong Division
- 2012–2013: Barisal Burners
- 2013/14: Kalabagan Cricket Academy
- 2014/15–2018/19: Abahani Limited
- 2015–2024: Sylhet Strikers
- 2016–present: Prime Bank Cricket Club
- 2016: Rajshahi Kings
- 2017–2019: Rangpur Riders
- 2017/18: Sheikh Jamal Dhanmondi Club
- 2021/22–2022/23: Mohammedan Sporting Club
- 2024/25–present: Dhaka Capitals

Career statistics
Competition	Test	ODI	T20I	FC
Matches	1	5	13	88
Runs scored	4	7	18	906
Batting average	2.00	7.00	18.00	10.41
100s/50s	0/0	0/0	0/0	0/0
Top score	4	7	8	38
Balls bowled	174	264	231	17728
Wickets	4	5	8	282
Bowling average	19.00	44.80	33.12	28.32
5 wickets in innings	0	0	0	9
10 wickets in match	0	0	0	2
Best bowling	2/27	2/38	3/28	6/23
Catches/stumpings	0/–	1/–	6/–	37/–
Medal record
Representing Bangladesh
Men's Cricket
South Asian Games
Gold medal – first place	2010 Dhaka	Team
- Source: ESPNcricinfo, 15 June 2025

Mohammad Nazmul Islam (born 21 March 1991), also known as Nazmul Apu, is a Bangladeshi first-class, List A and Twenty20 cricketer and former international cricketer. Nazmul is a left-handed batsman and a left-arm orthodox spin bowler.

== Domestic career ==
Nazmul has played for Dhaka Division in the National Cricket League (NCL). He has represented his country as part of the Bangladesh A and under-23 teams. In the Bangladesh Cricket League (BCL), he has played for both East Zone and South Zone.

In October 2018, Nazmul was named in the squad for the Rangpur Riders team, following the draft for the 2018–19 Bangladesh Premier League. In November 2019, he was selected to play for the Sylhet Thunder in the 2019–20 Bangladesh Premier League. In November 2021, he was selected to play for the Kandy Warriors following the players' draft for the 2021 Lanka Premier League.

== International career ==
In February 2018, Nazmul was added to Bangladesh's Twenty20 International (T20I) squad for their series against Sri Lanka. He made his T20I debut for Bangladesh against Sri Lanka on 15 February 2018.

In August 2018, Nazmul was one of twelve debutants to be selected for a 31-man preliminary squad for Bangladesh ahead of the 2018 Asia Cup. Later that month, he was named in Bangladesh's fifteen-man squad for the tournament. He made his One Day International (ODI) debut for Bangladesh against Afghanistan on 23 September 2018.

In October 2018, Nazmul was named in Bangladesh's Test squad for their series against Zimbabwe. He made his Test debut for Bangladesh against Zimbabwe on 3 November 2018.

== Personal life ==
=== Covid-19 ===
On 20 June 2020, Nazmul was reportedly tested positive for COVID-19 alongside fellow Bangladeshi cricketers Mashrafe Mortaza and Nafees Iqbal.
