= Nabil Samad =

Bangladeshi cricketer (born 1986)

Personal information
- Full name: Nabil Samad Chowdhury
- Born: 9 October 1986 (age 40); Dhaka, Bangladesh
- Batting: Left-handed
- Bowling: Slow left arm orthodox
- Role: Bowler

Domestic team information
- Years: Team
- 2016: Brothers Union
- 2015/16: Chittagong Division
- 2012/13–2014/15: East Zone
- 2003/04–2014/15: Sylhet Division
- First-class debut: 10 December 2003 Sylhet Division v Khulna Division
- Last First-class: 31 October 2015 Chittagong Division v Barisal Division
- List A debut: 14 December 2003 Sylhet Division v Khulna Division
- Last List A: 4 June 2016 Brothers Union v Victoria Sporting Club

Career statistics
Competition	FC	LA	T20
Matches	90	85	38
Runs scored	922	220	12
Batting average	9.80	7.33	2.00
100s/50s	–/–	–/–	–/–
Top score	40*	23	4
Balls bowled	20319	4163	752
Wickets	305	109	22
Bowling average	27.54	25.93	40.27
5 wickets in innings	15	2	–
10 wickets in match	2	–	–
Best bowling	8/61	5/26	2/12
Catches/stumpings	34/–	31/–	8/–
- Source: Cricket Archive, 15 November 2016

Nabil Samad (born 9 October 1986, in Dhaka) is a Bangladeshi cricketer who plays first-class cricket for Sylhet Division. A spin bowler, he represented Bangladesh in the 2006 U-19 Cricket World Cup in Sri Lanka. Nabil was bought by Sylhet Royals for $20,000 and proved effective from his first game by bowling flat for low economy rates. He joined Chittagong Division for the 2015–16 Bangladeshi cricket season.

In October 2018, he was named in the squad for the Sylhet Sixers team, following the draft for the 2018–19 Bangladesh Premier League.
