= Imrul Kayes =

Bangladeshi cricketer

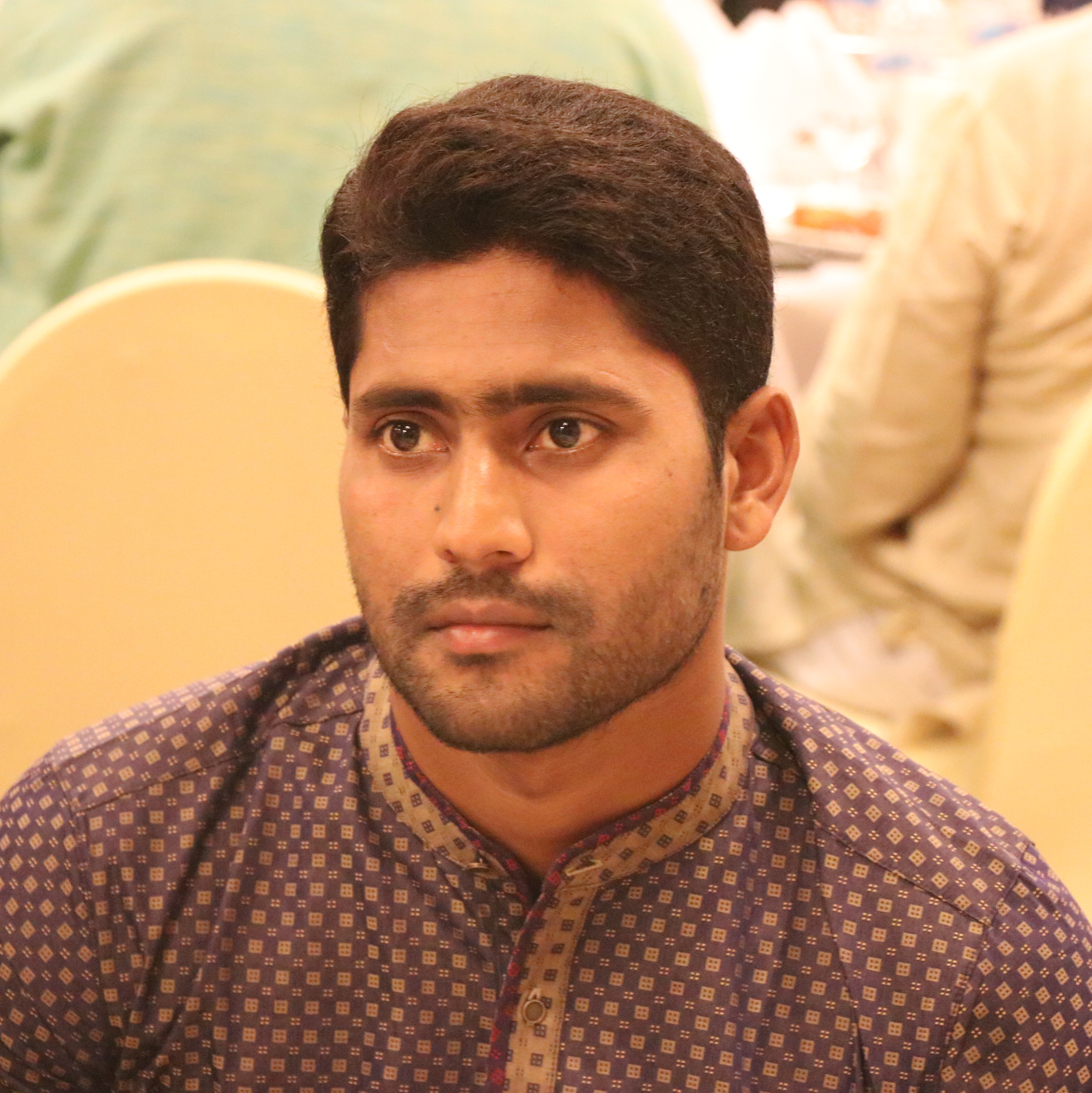
- Imrul Kayes in 2018

Personal information
- Full name: Imrul Kayes
- Born: 2 February 1987 (age 39); Meherpur, Khulna, Bangladesh
- Nickname: Sagar, ইম্রুল ব্রো
- Height: 5 ft 7 in (1.70 m)
- Batting: Left-handed
- Bowling: Slow left-arm orthodox
- Role: Opening batsman, occasional wicket-keeper

International information
- National side: Bangladesh (2008–2019)
- Test debut (cap 53): 19 November 2008 v South Africa
- Last Test: 22 November 2019 v India
- ODI debut (cap 93): 14 October 2008 v New Zealand
- Last ODI: 11 December 2018 v West Indies
- ODI shirt no.: 45
- T20I debut (cap 26): 1 May 2010 v Pakistan
- Last T20I: 29 October 2017 v South Africa

Domestic team information
- Years: Team
- 2006–2024: Khulna Division
- 2012: Sylhet Royals
- 2013: Rangpur Riders
- 2015–2019: Comilla Victorians
- 2019/20: Chattogram Challengers
- 2022–2024: Comilla Victorians
- 2025: Khulna Tigers

Career statistics
Competition	Test	ODI	FC	LA
Matches	39	78	138	242
Runs scored	1,797	2,434	7,947	7,952
Batting average	24.28	32.02	33.53	34.72
100s/50s	3/4	4/16	20/27	14/51
Top score	150	144	204	144
Balls bowled	24	0	367	137
Wickets	0	–	6	2
Bowling average	–	–	43.33	63.50
5 wickets in innings	0	–	0	0
10 wickets in match	0	–	0	0
Best bowling	–	–	1/0	2/18
Catches/stumpings	35/0	21/0	125/0	92/2
Medal record
Men's Cricket
Representing Bangladesh
ACC Asia Cup
Runner-up	2012 Bangladesh
Runner-up	2016 Bangladesh
Runner-up	2018 UAE
Asian Games
Bronze medal – third place	2014 Incheon	Team
- Source: ESPNcricinfo, 14 June 2025

Imrul Kayes (Bengali: ইমরুল কায়েস; born 2 February 1987) is a former Bangladeshi international cricketer and former captain of Comilla Victorians who played for Khulna Division as a left-handed batsman and occasional wicket-keeper.

== International career ==
Kayes made his first-class debut in 2006, playing 15 first-class matches and 16 One Day matches before being called up for the third One Day International between Bangladesh and New Zealand in Chittagong. Batting at number three, he made just 12 runs as Bangladesh lost by 79 runs.

He made his Test debut in November 2008, playing the first match of a series in South Africa. He opened the batting on debut, but made just 10 and 4 in his two innings, being dismissed twice on the second afternoon of the match.

He found form in 2010, scoring 867 runs and becoming the 5th highest runs scorer of the year in ODIs at an average of 32.11. He scored his maiden ODI century against New Zealand. When the Bangladesh Cricket Board (BCB) announced its list of central contracts in November 2010, Imrul Kayes was given a grade B contract.

In 2017, in the second test against New Zealand after Mushfiqur Rahim got a head injury in the first Test, Imrul Kayes served as a substitute wicket-keeper and had 5 dismissals in an innings, the highest haul for any substitute wicketkeeper in an innings of a Test, also making him the first substitute wicket-keeper to take 5 Test catches.

On 21 October 2018, Imrul Kayes scored a career best 144(140) against Zimbabwe in the first ODI, tying it with second most by a Bangladeshi batsman in an ODI along with Mushfiqur Rahim. After the concluding third ODI, Imrul Kayes had scored 349 runs in the series with scores of 144, 90, and 115, respectively, which would help Bangladesh whitewash Zimbabwe in the series. He accomplished the feat of making the second most runs in a bilateral three match ODI series, just 11 runs shy from current record holder Babar Azam.

In May 2021, he was named in Bangladesh's ODI preliminary squad for their home series against Sri Lanka, since he last played an ODI against the Windies in 2018.

=== 2011 World Cup ===
Bangladesh failed to progress beyond the group stage of the 2011 World Cup; Imrul Kayes was Bangladesh's leading run-scorer in the tournament with 188 runs at an average of 37.60. During the tournament, he produced two Man-of-the-Match performances, striking fifties against England and the Netherlands to help Bangladesh to victory on each occasion, though he felt bowler Shafiul Islam deserved the first award instead. With Manjural Islam Rana he became just the second Bangladesh player to win consecutive Man-of-the-Match awards in ODIs.

== Domestic career ==
The BCB founded the six-team Bangladesh Premier League in 2012, a twenty20 tournament to be held in February that year. An auction was held for teams to buy players, and Imrul Kayes was bought by the Sylhet Royals for $50,000. He scored 102 runs from 7 innings in the competition. In April the BCB upgraded Imrul Kayes' central contract from grade B to grade A.

In October 2018, he was named in the squad for the Comilla Victorians team, following the draft for the 2018–19 Bangladesh Premier League. In November 2019, he was selected to play for the Chattogram Challengers in the 2019–20 Bangladesh Premier League.

== Retirement ==
Imrul announced his retirement from Test and first-class cricket in November 2024.

== International centuries ==
Test centuries by Imrul Kayes
No.	Runs	Against	Venue	H/A	Date	Result	Ref
1	115	Sri Lanka	Zohur Ahmed Chowdhury Stadium, Chittagong	Home	4 February 2014	Drawn	
2	130	Zimbabwe	Zohur Ahmed Chowdhury Stadium, Chittagong	Home	12 November 2014	Won	
3	150	Pakistan	Sheikh Abu Naser Stadium, Khulna	Home	28 April 2015	Drawn	

ODI centuries by Imrul Kayes
No.	Runs	Against	Venue	H/A	Date	Result	Ref
1	101	New Zealand	Lancaster Park, Christchurch	Away	11 February 2010	Lost	
2	112	England	Sher-e-Bangla National Cricket Stadium, Dhaka	Home	7 October 2016	Lost	
3	144	Zimbabwe	Sher-e-Bangla National Cricket Stadium, Dhaka	Home	21 October 2018	Won	
4	115	Zimbabwe	Zohur Ahmed Chowdhury Stadium, Chittagong	Home	26 October 2018	Won	
