= Comilla Victorians =

Bangladeshi Cricket Franchise

- কুমিল্লা ভিক্টোরিয়ান্স
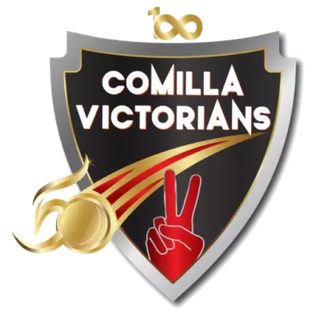
- Nickname: Win Or Win
- League: Bangladesh Premier League

Personnel
- Captain: Litton Das
- Owner: Nafisa Kamal

Team information
- City: Cumilla, Bangladesh
- Founded: 2015–2018, 2022—2024 (as Comilla Victorians); 2019 (as Cumilla Warriors)
- Home ground: Shaheed Dhirendranath Datta Stadium, Cumilla

History
- Bangladesh Premier League wins: 4 (2015, 2019, 2022, 2023)

Comilla Victorians (Bengali: কুমিল্লা ভিক্টোরিয়ান্স) is a Bangladeshi professional men's cricket team which competed in the Bangladesh Premier League, a T-20 cricket league. The team is based in Cumilla, a city in eastern Bangladesh. Comilla Victorians has won the BPL title 4 times. The team is currently owned by Nafisa Kamal, the daughter of AHM Mustafa Kamal, a former finance minister under the Sheikh Hasina government.

On 16 November 2019, Bangladesh Cricket Board (BCB) announced themselves as the sponsor of the team and it was renamed to Cumilla Warriors. The team were replaced by Comilla Victorians after the previous owners returned ahead of the 2021–22 Bangladesh Premier League.

Due to the owners' relations with the Hasina ministry that was revoked following the Student–People's uprising in August 2024, the team didn't participate in the 2025 Bangladesh Premier League.

== Franchise history ==
The Comilla Victorians were created when the decision was made to expand the number of teams and move away from division-representing teams to city-representing teams for the third season of the competition. With the revamp of Bangladesh Premier League, a scope was created for interested bidders to bid for Cumilla-based franchise, being one of the largest city in Chattogram Division. The legal franchise rights were sold to Nafisa Kamal (Legends Sporting Limited), a former owner of now-defunct franchise Sylhet Royals. The rights were bought at US$27.50 million for five years. During October 2015, Comilla Victorians was officially established, thus becoming the only other team representing a city in Chattogram Division. The team won their first title on 2015-16 Bangladesh Premier League but they failed to keep the title in 2016-17 Bangladesh Premier League season.

== Season overview ==
=== Season 3 (2015) ===
The Comilla Victorians were the newest addition to the Bangladesh Premier League. The draft pick was held on 22 October 2015, where the team picked three overseas players and thirteen national players. Some of them were Imrul Kayes and Liton Das. In the icon selection, they got the second pick in the lottery and chose Mashrafe Mortaza. Before the tournament, analysts predicted the Victorians as the weakest team in the tournament due to lack of variation in the team, despite inclusion of experienced players like Shoaib Malik and big hitters like Andre Russell.

The Comilla Victorians opened its campaign against Dhaka Dynamites. The game was played on 22 November which ended in a defeat to Dhaka Dynamites by six wickets. They went on to win 7 matches while losing only two. The team finished the regular season on top the table. Comilla defeated Rangpur Riders in the first qualifier to advance to the finals. In the final against Barisal Bulls, Alok Kapali squeezed a single of the last ball to win a thriller and hence were crowned the champions in their debut season.

Imrul Kayes was the second highest run-scorer of the tournament, scoring 312 runs at an average of 28.36 while Abu Hider was the second highest wicket taker of the tournament with 21 wickets. He also got the best Bangladeshi player award while their all-rounder, Ashar Zaidi was awarded the player of the tournament.

=== Season 4 (2016) ===
The Victorians were looking to defend their title but failed in that mission miserably. Even with players like Ahmed Shehzad, Marlon Samuels, Mashrafe Mortaza and Rashid Khan, they lost their first 5 games in a row. They somehow managed to finish at the 2nd last place in the league stage thus ending their campaign in a rather sour note.

=== Season 5 (2017) ===
Tamim Iqbal was announced icon player of the team and the skipper as they didn't extend Mashrafe Mortaza's contract this time unlike in 2016. Mohammad Salahuddin returned as the team's coach after a single season stint with Chittagong Vikings. All-rounder Mohammad Nabi from Afghanistan and Pakistani seamer Imran Khan Jr. joined the team after finishing a season with the Vikings. Shoaib Malik returned after spending some time with Nabi and Imran at the dressing room last year while English keeper Jos Buttler, Kiwi batter Colin Munro, Pakistani seamer Hassan Ali, Hasan's ‘new-sensation’ countryman Fakhar Zaman, Lankan all rounder Angelo Mathews and more players will be representing the Victorians for the first time. Marlon Samuels and Rashid Khan has been retained by the team management.

In the draft, their first pick was pacer Al-Amin Hossain. Their surprise picks were all-rounder Mahedi Hasan, pacer Mehedi Hasan Rana and Zimbabwean cricketer Solomon Mire.

In the group games, Comilla performed very well. The team went on to win 9 games and losing 3, topping the leaderboard. However, the team suffered a heavy defeat against their arch rival Dhaka Dynamites in Qualifier-1. Rangpur Riders eliminated them in Qualifier-2 which was filled with controversy. Due to persistent rain, the match was signaled to resume the next day which was against the bylaws of BPL. The rule was if the match had to be called off, then the team higher in group rankings would advance, hence Comilla Victorians’ team management were very angry.

=== Season 6 (2019) ===
All the franchises were given until 30 September 2018 to submit their 4 retained cricketers. Comilla Victorians retained Tamim Iqbal, Imrul Kayes, Mohammad Saifuddin and Shoaib Malik. As all franchises are allowed to sign 2 foreign players pre-draft (but they can't be their players from last season), Comilla went ahead and signed English all rounder, Liam Dawson and Sri Lankan Asela Gunaratne.

In the draft, Comilla's notable domestic picks were pacer Abu Hider and wicket-keeper batsman Anamul Haque. Some of their overseas picks were all-rounders Shahid Afridi and Thisara Perera as well as West Indian batsman Evin Lewis and Australian batsman Steve Smith, who is currently serving a one-year ban for Ball tampering. Their most interesting pick was young Afghanistan left-arm seamer Waqar Salamkheil. Overall, the Victorians managed to forge a very balanced team.

Comilla Victorians beat Rangpur in the playoff to reach final. In the final Tamim slammed 141 in just 61 balls as Comilla beat their rival Dhaka to be crowned BPL 2018-19 Champion.This is Comilla Victorian's 2nd BPL trophy.

=== Season 7 (2019-20) ===
During the player's direct signing period, a Conflict of Interests aroused between BCB and all other franchises. Subsequently, in September 2019, BCB made some changes in rules and regulations for this season and eliminated all franchises, BCB took over the charge of the current BPL and decided to run this current tournament by the board itself and named the tournament as Bangabandhu BPL T20 2019 in order to pay homage to Sheikh Mujibur Rahman on his birth centenary. The team was owned and managed by BCB itself.

The team signs Mushfiqur Rahim as their icon player for this season. The team authority has confirmed this news after the Sri Lanka tour in 2019. He was in Chittagong Vikings in the last BPL 6th edition. Alongside the team bought Soumya Sarkar, Al-Amin Hossain, Sabbir Rahman, Abu Hider from the players' draft while Dasun Shanaka, Mujeeb Ur Rahman and Dawid Malan being foreign players. Dasun Shanaka was selected as captain for this team.

=== Season 10 ===
The Comilla Victorians opened its campaign against their old rival Durdanto Dhaka. Victorians started BPL with a loss in BPL Clasico against their arch rival Dhaka.

The squad consists of notable National cricketers such as Captain Liton Das, Mustafizur Rahman, Imrul Kayes and Towhid Hridoy. International players include Andre Russell, Sunil Narine, Moeen Ali, Mohammad Rizwan, Will Jacks and Johnson Charles.

== Seasons ==
=== Bangladesh Premier League ===
Year	League standing	Final standing
2015	1st out of 6	Champions
2016	6th out of 7	League stage
2017	1st out of 7	Playoffs
2019	2nd out of 7	Champions
2019-20	5th out of 7	League stage
2022	2nd out of 6	Champions
2023	2nd out of 7	Champions
2024	2nd out of 7	Runners-up
