= Bangladesh Premier League =

Bangladeshi professional twenty20 cricket league

- Countries: Bangladesh
- Administrator: Bangladesh Cricket Board
- Format: Twenty20
- First edition: 2012
- Latest edition: 2025–26
- Tournament format: Double round-robin and Playoffs
- Number of teams: 6
- Current champion: Rajshahi Warriors (2nd title)
- Most successful: Comilla Victorians (4 titles)
- Most runs: Tamim Iqbal (3835)
- Most wickets: Shakib Al Hasan (149)
- TV: List of broadcasters
- Website: bplt20.com.bd

Bangladesh Premier League (Bengali: বাংলাদেশ প্রিমিয়ার লিগ), abbreviated BPL, is a professional Twenty20 cricket league in Bangladesh, organised by the Bangladesh Cricket Board (BCB). It was formed in 2011 by the BCB, after the suspension of its predecessor organisation, 2009/10 National Cricket League Twenty20. The first season was held in February 2012, and the games were held across Dhaka and Chittagong. The BPL is headed by the chairman of its Governing Council.

Following the success of franchise Twenty20 cricket leagues such as the Indian Premier League around the world, the Bangladesh Cricket Board announced a plan to replace the National Cricket League with a franchise-based league. On 18 January 2012, the board entered a 6-year, 350-crore deal with Game on Sports Group to establish a franchise tournament. The deal gave the group exclusive rights to manage the tournament. The league was founded with six franchises from the largest cities of Bangladesh. Nine companies took part in the bidding process for the franchise auction, with six winning the rights to clubs.

In July 2022, after the International Cricket Council accommodated the months of January and February for the BPL, in its ICC Future Tours Programme, the BCB announced the schedule of the BPL for the next three seasons.

== History ==
=== 2012 (1st edition) ===
The first edition of the league officially kicked off on 9 February 2012, with a lavish opening ceremony at the Sher-e-Bangla National Cricket Stadium in Dhaka, the capital city of Bangladesh. Shariar Islam Mozumder Shawon was the owner and organizer of BPL. The initial player auction was held on 18 and 19 January 2012, and the first match in the tournament was staged on 9 February 2012 at the Sher-e-Bangla National Cricket Stadium between Sylhet Royals and Barisal Burners. The first Bangladesh Premier League season's final game was between Dhaka Gladiators and Barisal Burners, with Dhaka Gladiators emerging as champions after winning by eight wickets. All matches in the first edition of the league were held at the Sher-e-Bangla National Cricket Stadium and Zohur Ahmed Chowdhury Stadium in the country's second-largest city, Chittagong.

=== 2013 (2nd edition) ===
Rangpur Riders were added as a seventh team for the second season. Dhaka Gladiators again emerged as champions, beating Chittagong Kings in the final by 43 runs. Once again, Sher-e-Bangla National Cricket Stadium in Dhaka hosted the final. For most of the matches, the MA Aziz Stadium replaced the Zohur Ahmed Chowdhury Stadium in Chittagong due to higher capacity, and Khulna Divisional Stadium in Khulna (third-largest city) was added as the third venue.

The owners of Dhaka Gladiators were handed a lifetime suspension by the governing committee. A number of players and administrators were handed bans for match-fixing, including the former captain of Bangladesh, Mohammad Ashraful.

=== 2015 (3rd edition) ===
Following the match-fixing scandal and political issues of the country, the league was not played in 2014. It returned in 2015 with six new franchises, and it was held in winter, unlike spring previously. Comilla Victorians won the competition, beating Barisal Bulls by three wickets. Leading up to the 2016–17 edition of the league, the Sylhet Super Stars were suspended following breaches of disciplinary regulations, and two new franchises, Khulna Titans and Rajshahi Kings, were introduced, bringing the number of teams in the competition back to seven.

=== 2016 (4th edition) ===
The 2016 BPL draft was held on 30 September. Prior to the draft, the seven clubs signed 38 foreign players to contracts, and each existing franchise was able to retain two home-grown players from the 2015 season. A total of 301 players participated in the draft, including 133 local and 168 foreign players. 85 players were selected in the draft. Dhaka Dynamites, captained by Shakib Al Hasan, topped the group stage table, whereas Rajshahi Kings, led by Darren Sammy, stood at the fourth position. Dynamites beat Khulna Titans in qualifier 1 and went to the final. Rajshahi Kings defeated Chittagong Vikings and Khulna Titans, respectively, in the eliminator and qualifier.

In the final, after winning the toss, Kings' captain D. Sammy elected to field first. The Dynamites scored 159 runs in 20 overs with a loss of 9 wickets. They scored 23 runs in the opening partnership. Evin Lewis top scored for the Dynamites with 45 runs. Kings' bowler Farhad Reza took 3 wickets for 28 runs. The Kings failed to build a good opening partnership. After scoring 60 runs, they started losing wickets and couldn't hold on. The Dynamites won the match and their 1st title by a wide margin of 56 runs. Kumar Sangakkara was named the man of the match. This was the 3rd title for a Dhaka franchise in BPL.

Khulna Titans' skipper Mahmudullah was made the player of the tournament since he scored the second most runs (384) and defended less than 7 runs in the last over of the 2nd innings in more than one instance.

=== 2017 (5th edition) ===
It was the fifth season of the Bangladesh Premier League (BPL). The competition was organised by the Bangladesh Cricket Board (BCB) and featured seven teams from seven different cities. The season began on 4 November and ended on 12 December 2017, with the defending champion, Dhaka Dynamites playing against Sylhet Sixers in the first game at Sylhet International Cricket Stadium.

Barisal Bulls were excluded from the tournament after failing to meet financial terms and conditions.

Group stage matches were played in three blocks. The first and third blocks took place in Dhaka, with the middle block of 10 matches taking place in Chittagong. Two matches were played on each day of the group stage part of the tournament. The first four matches of the tournament were washed out after heavy rain, and the two matches scheduled to take place on 6 November were postponed. The tournament was restarted on 8 November, with the first six fixtures to be rescheduled at a later date. The matches from the opening day of fixtures were replayed with the points table reset.

In the finale, Rangpur Riders defeated Dhaka Dynamites to win their first title. In the final match, Chris Gayle was awarded the man of the match award and also won the player of the series award. He was the leading run scorer in the tournament with 2 banger centuries (146* of 69 and 126 of 51 ) and a total tally of 485 runs. Shakib Al Hasan was the leading wicket taker with 22 wickets.

=== 2018–19 (6th edition) ===
Originally, the season was scheduled to start on 1 October 2018 and end on 16 November 2018. However, in May 2018, it was reported that the tournament might be moved to January 2019 because of security concerns around the Bangladeshi general election, which took place in December 2018. In July 2018, it was confirmed that the tournament would start in January 2019. For this edition of the tournament, the Decision Review System (DRS) was used for the first time.

In the 2018–19 Bangladesh Premier League final, the Comilla Victorians defeated Dhaka Dynamites by 17 runs to win their second title. In the final match, Tamim Iqbal was awarded the man of the match award after scoring 141 not out. Rilee Rossouw was the leading run scorer in the tournament with 558 runs. Shakib Al Hasan was the leading wicket-taker with 22 wickets and also won the player of the tournament award.

=== 2019–20 (7th edition) ===
Rajshahi Royals defeated Khulna Tigers by 21 runs in the final match. Royals skipper Andre Russell was elected as both Man of the Match for the final and Player of the Tournament for his all-round performances and for leading his team to their maiden BPL title.

=== 2021–22 (8th edition) ===
The 2022 season was initially scheduled to start in March 2021. However, the tournament was postponed and rescheduled to be held from 21 January to 18 February 2022. In December 2021, all six teams were announced, with Rangpur Rangers and the defending champion Rajshahi Royals being excluded. A franchise from Barisal was included, and Comilla Victorians also returned after a year's break. Initially, Rupa Steel & Marn Group owned the Dhaka franchise, but a day before the players' draft, their ownership was terminated due to noncompliance with rules. However, the Minister Group took ownership of the franchise after the players' draft. Due to the unavailability of technical teams, the DRS system could not be used in this season. Initially, BCB decided to allow spectators this year; however, due to the rise of Omicron variants, the board backed out from its decision and decided to play behind closed doors.

The two points table topper teams; Fortune Barishal and Comilla Victorians; reached the final. In the final, Comilla Victorians defended 151 runs to win their third title in a thrilling 1-run victory. Sunil Narine was the Player of the Final for his all-round performances. Shakib Al Hasan, captain of the runners-up team, Fortune Barishal, received the Player of the Tournament award for his all-round performance, having scored 284 runs in 11 innings and picked up 16 wickets.

=== 2023 (9th edition) ===
BCB announced the list of franchise owners in September 2022, with five of the previous six franchises retaining ownership and the return of Rangpur Riders after two seasons. On 24 December 2022, BCB announced the fixtures for this season with two matches to be played per day in the group stage and having reserve days for all the knockout matches.

In the final, Comilla Victorians defeated Sylhet Strikers by 7 wickets to win their second successive and overall fourth title.

=== 2024 (10th edition) ===
In the opening match, Durdanto Dhaka defeated the then defending champions Comilla Victorians in the first match. But surprisingly, that was their only win, and they had to face defeats all the way. Many international players also played in this season, namely Imran Tahir, James Neesham, Keshav Maharaj, David Miller, etc., making this season a remarkable one.

Fortune Barishal stopped Comilla Victorians from winning back-to-back-to-back titles by defeating them in the final. Barishal won their first-ever title in this tournament.

=== 2025 (11th edition) ===
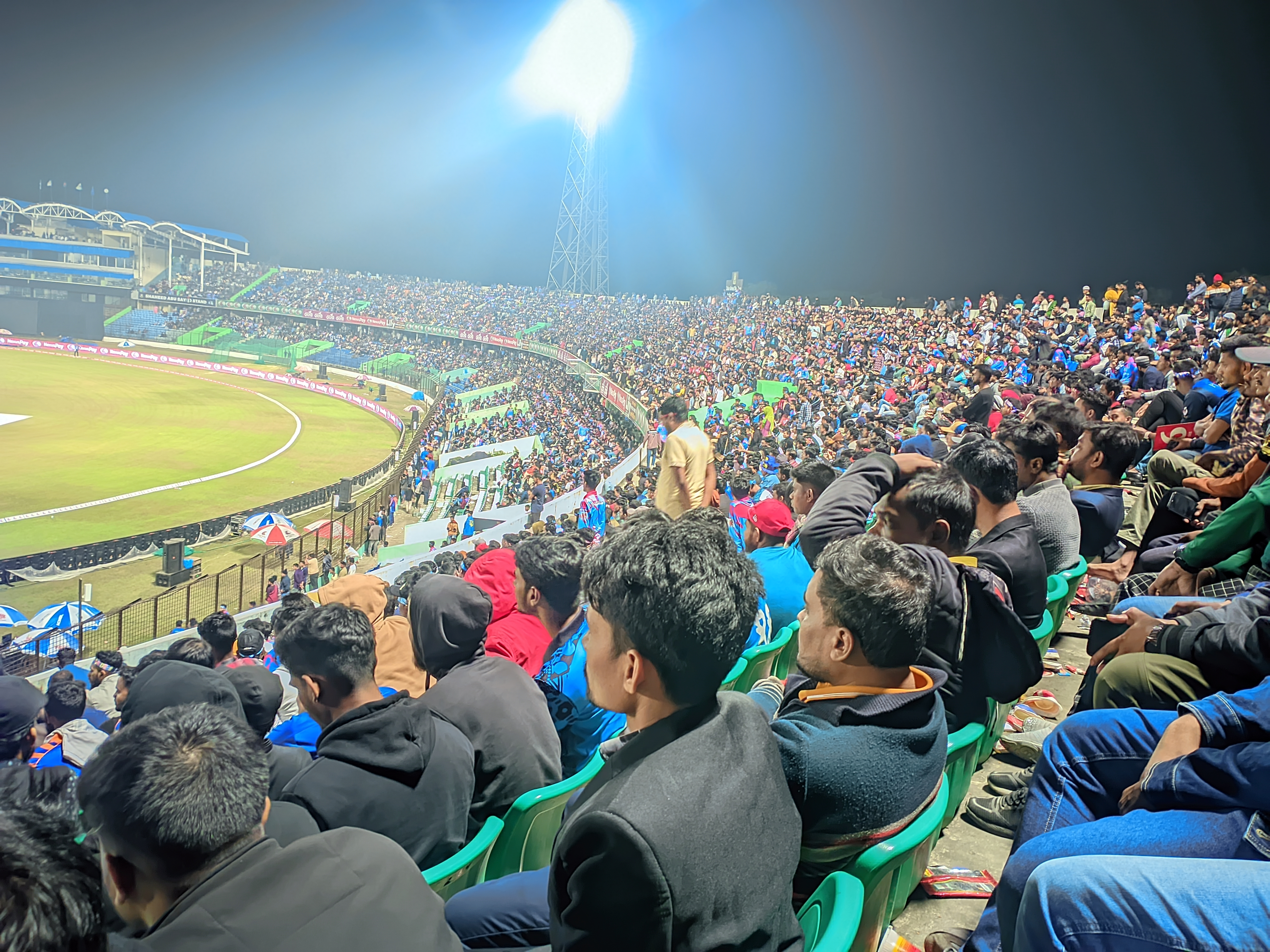
Excited Crowd at Zohur Ahmed Chowdhury Stadium for BPL Clash – 17 January 2025

In the opening match, Fortune Barishal beat Durbar Rajshahi by 4 wickets at Sher-e-Bangla National Cricket Stadium, Dhaka, and Mahmudullah was player of the match.

Rajshahi has been dogged by financial problems from the start of this BPL. Local players hadn't received any payments prior to the start of the tournament, as they are usually played 25% before the tournament starts. They boycotted a training session in Chittagong last month, while the overseas players boycotted a match. Burl and Haris eventually made themselves available to play and helped them stay in contention for a playoff finish, but they fell short on net run rate.

In the final match, Fortune Barishal crafted the second-highest chase to win a final in men's T20 cricket, knocking off 195 against Chittagong Kings with three wickets and three balls to spare. And with that, they had successfully defended their BPL crown, having come into this season as defending champions. The packed house at the Shere Bangla National Stadium in Dhaka was treated to Barishal captain Tamim Iqbal striking a rapid fifty, before Kyle Mayers did the running in the middle overs, and Rishad Hossain's two sixes sealed things.

=== 2026 (12th edition) ===
The 12th edition of the Bangladesh Premier League (BPL 2026) commenced on 26 December 2025, and is scheduled to conclude with the grand final on 23 January 2026. Organised by the Bangladesh Cricket Board (BCB), this season features a streamlined roster of six franchises—Noakhali Express, Dhaka Capitals, Chattogram Royals, Rajshahi Warriors, Rangpur Riders, and Sylhet Titans—competing in a double round-robin format followed by a four-match playoff stage. The tournament is being hosted across two major venues: Sylhet International Cricket Stadium and Sher-e-Bangla National Cricket Stadium in Dhaka.

The tournament faced initial challenges, including the cancellation of a grand opening ceremony in Dhaka due to security concerns (replaced by a low-key event in Sylhet) and ownership changes for the Chattogram Royals just 24 hours before the start. Despite these hurdles, the league has maintained high viewership through platforms like T Sports and Nagorik TV.

The final was held in Sher-e-Bangla International Cricket Stadium in Dhaka on 23 January 2026. In the final, Rajshahi Warriors won against Chattogram Royals by 63 runs. The final started after an electrifying opening ceremony. Rajshahi scored 174, losing 4 wickets, with Tanzid Hasan scoring a century. However, chasing this huge total, Chattogram was bowled out, scoring 111 in 17.5 overs. Rajshahi bowlers Binura Fernando and Hasan Murad took 3 and 4 wickets, respectively. Tanzid Hasan was the Player of the Match, and bowler Shoriful Islam was the Player of the Tournament, taking 26 wickets in the whole tournament.

=== 2027 (13th edition) ===
The 2027 season followed uncertainty over the future of the Bangladesh Premier League (BPL) after the Bangladesh Cricket Board (BCB) and franchises called for major reforms. In August 2026, Rangpur Riders, Rajshahi Warriors and Dhaka Capitals supported restructuring the tournament and said they were willing to accept a one-year break if necessary. The reforms focused on financial sustainability, player payments, scheduling, franchise operations and a long-term five-year calendar.

== League organisation ==
Locations of Bangladesh Premier League teams

At a corporate level, the Bangladesh Premier League considers itself an association made up of and financed by its member teams. All income generated through television rights, licensing agreements, sponsorship, ticket sales, and other means is earned and shared between the Bangladesh Cricket Board and the participating franchises. The league is controlled by a Governing Council (GC). As the parent organisation, the Bangladesh Cricket Board appoints the GC's members.

As of the 2025–26 season, the league consists of six franchises. Each team plays every other team twice in the round-robin stage of the competition, with the teams with the top 4 advancing to a series of play-off matches. These lead to a championship match in which the league champion is decided.

== Teams ==
Team	Owner	Captain	Coach
Chattogram Royals	Bangladesh Cricket Board	Mahedi Hasan	Mizanur Rahman Babul
Dhaka Capitals	Champions Sports Ltd. and Remark HB Limited	Mohammad Mithun	Toby Radford
Rangpur Riders	Toggi Sports	Nurul Hasan Sohan; Litton Das	Mickey Arthur
Sylhet Titans	JM Sports	Mehidy Hasan Miraz	Sohel Islam
Rajshahi Warriors	Nabil Group	Najmul Hossain Shanto	Hannan Sarkar
Noakhali Express	Desh Travels	Shykat Ali; Haider Ali	Khaled Mahmud

=== Franchise history ===
Franchise	2012	2013	2015	2016	2017	2019	2020	2022	2023	2024	2025	2026
Barishal	Barisal Burners		Barisal Bulls		DNP			Fortune Barishal				DNP
Chattogram	Chittagong Kings		Chittagong Vikings				Chattogram Challengers				Chittagong Kings	Chattogram Royals
Comilla	Team did not exist		Comilla Victorians			Comilla Warriors	Comilla Victorians				DNP	
Dhaka	Dhaka Gladiators		Dhaka Dynamites				Dhaka Platoon	Minister Dhaka	Dhaka Dominators	Durdanto Dhaka	Dhaka Capitals	
Khulna	Khulna Royal Bengals		DNP	Khulna Titans			Khulna Tigers					DNP
Noakhali	Team did not exist											Noakhali Express
Rajshahi	Duronto Rajshahi		DNP	Rajshahi Kings			Rajshahi Royals	DNP			Durbar Rajshahi	Rajshahi Warriors
Rangpur	Team did not exist	Rangpur Riders					Rangpur Rangers	DNP	Rangpur Riders			
Sylhet	Sylhet Royals		Sylhet Super Stars	DNP	Sylhet Sixers		Sylhet Thunder	Sylhet Sunrisers	Sylhet Strikers			Sylhet Titans

== Player selection ==
The first two editions of the BPL (2012 and 2013) utilized an auction system for franchises to acquire players for their squads. However, from 2015 to 2025, players were selected through a draft system.

With IMG taking over the organization of the BPL from the 2026 season, franchises advocated for the return of the auction system. As a result, the Bangladesh Cricket Board has reintroduced the auction system for the 2026 BPL season.

== Tournament seasons and results ==
=== Finals ===
All finals in the competition have been played at the Sher-e-Bangla National Cricket Stadium at Mirpur.

Season	Final			Player of the Tournament
Season	Winner	Result	Runner-up	Player of the Tournament
2012; Details	Dhaka Gladiators; 144/2 (15.4 overs)	Dhaka Gladiators won by 8 wickets Scorecard	Barisal Burners; 140/7 (20 overs)	Shakib Al Hasan (Khulna Royal Bengals)
2013; Details	Dhaka Gladiators; 172/9 (20 overs)	Dhaka Gladiators won by 43 runs Scorecard	Chittagong Kings; 129 (16.5 overs)	Shakib Al Hasan (Dhaka Gladiators)
2014	(Cancelled due to 2014 Bangladesh Political Crisis)			
2015; Details	Comilla Victorians; 157/7 (20 overs)	Comilla Victorians won by 3 wickets Scorecard	Barisal Bulls; 156/4 (20 overs)	Ashar Zaidi (Comilla Victorians)
2016; Details	Dhaka Dynamites; 159/9 (20 overs)	Dhaka Dynamites won by 56 runs Scorecard	Rajshahi Kings; 103 (17.4 overs)	Mahmudullah (Khulna Titans)
2017; Details	Rangpur Riders; 206/1 (20 overs)	Rangpur Riders won by 57 runs Scorecard	Dhaka Dynamites; 149/9 (20 overs)	Chris Gayle (Rangpur Riders)
2018; Details	Comilla Victorians; 199/3 (20 overs)	Comilla Victorians won by 17 runs Scorecard	Dhaka Dynamites; 182/9 (20 overs)	Shakib Al Hasan (Dhaka Dynamites)
2019; Details	Rajshahi Royals; 170/4 (20 overs)	Rajshahi Royals won by 21 runs Scorecard	Khulna Tigers; 149/8 (20 overs)	Andre Russell (Rajshahi Royals)
2020	(Cancelled due to COVID-19 pandemic)			
2021	(Cancelled due to COVID-19 pandemic)			
2022; Details	Comilla Victorians; 151/9 (20 overs)	Comilla Victorians won by 1 run Scorecard	Fortune Barishal; 150/8 (20 overs)	Shakib Al Hasan (Fortune Barishal)
2023; Details	Comilla Victorians; 176/3 (19.2 overs)	Comilla Victorians won by 7 wickets Scorecard	Sylhet Strikers; 175/7 (20 overs)	Najmul Hossain Shanto (Sylhet Strikers)
2024; Details	Fortune Barishal; 157/4 (19 overs)	Fortune Barishal won by 6 wickets Scorecard	Comilla Victorians; 154/6 (20 overs)	Tamim Iqbal (Fortune Barishal)
2025; Details	Fortune Barishal; 195/7 (19.3 overs)	Fortune Barishal won by 3 wickets Scorecard	Chittagong Kings; 194/3 (20 overs)	Mehidy Hasan Miraz (Khulna Tigers)
2026; Details	Rajshahi Warriors; 174/4 (20 overs)	Rajshahi Warriors won by 63 runs Scorecard	Chattogram Royals; 111/10 (17.5 overs)	Shoriful Islam (Chattogram Royals)

=== Overall team performances ===
As of 24 January 2026

Records include all matches played under the name of a franchise, even where the franchise has been suspended and re-created as a new organization.

Overall team performances
Team	Match	Win	Loss	Tied	NR	Win%
Fortune Barishal	103	60	42	0	1	58.82%
Chattogram Royals	151	72	78	0	1	48.00%
Comilla Victorians	105	66	38	0	1	63.46%
Dhaka Capitals	149	69	78	0	2	46.94%
Khulna Tigers	125	54	70	0	1	43.55%
Rangpur Riders	129	72	57	0	0	55.81%
Sylhet Titans	131	48	81	0	2	37.21%
Rajshahi Warriors	103	56	47	0	0	54.37%
Noakhali Express	10	2	8	0	0	20.00%

Note:

- The win percentage excludes no results.

=== Overall team standings ===
Season (No. of Teams)	2012 (6)	2013 (7)	2015 (6)	2016 (7)	2017 (7)	2019 (7)	2020 (7)	2022 (6)	2023 (7)	2024 (7)	2025 (7)	2026 (6)
Fortune Barishal	RU	5th	RU	7th	DNP			RU	PO	C		DNP
Chattogram Royals	5th	RU	6th	PO	7th	PO	PO	PO	7th	PO	RU	RU
Comilla Victorians	N/A		C	6th	PO	C	5th	C	C	RU	DNP	
Dhaka Capitals	C	C	PO	C	RU	RU	PO	5th	6th	7th	6th	5th
Khulna Tigers	SF	7th	DNP	PO	PO	RU	PO	5th	5th	5th	PO	DNP
Noakhali Express	N/A											6th
Rajshahi Warriors	SF	PO	DNP	RU	6th	5th	C	DNP			5th	C
Rangpur Riders	N/A	5th	PO	5th	C	PO	6th	DNP	PO	PO	PO	PO
Sylhet Titans	6th	PO	5th	DNP	5th	6th	7th	6th	RU	6th	7th	PO

- C: Champion
- RU: Runner-up
- PO: Play Off
- DNP: Did not participate

=== Team performances ===
Team performances
Teams	Seasons	Appearances	Champion(s)	Runner–up(s)	Playoffs	League Stage
Comilla Victorians	2015–2024	7	4 (2015, 2019, 2022, 2023)	1 (2024)	1	1
Dhaka Capitals	2012–present	11	3 (2012, 2013, 2016)	2 (2017, 2019)	2	3
Fortune Barishal	2012–2025	8	2 (2024, 2025)	3 (2012, 2015, 2022)	1	2
Rajshahi Warriors	2012–present	6	2 (2019–20, 2026)	1 (2016)	2	2
Rangpur Riders	2013–present	7	1 (2017)	0	3	3
Chattogram Royals	2012–present	11	0	3 (2013, 2025, 2026)	5	4
Khulna Tigers	2012–2025	8	0	1 (2019–20)	4	2
Sylhet Titans	2012–present	11	0	1 (2023)	3	9
Noakhali Express	2026–present	1	0	0	0	0

== Rivalries ==
=== North Bengal Derby ===
The Rajshahi-Rangpur rivalry is a cricket rivalry between two franchises, the Rajshahi Warriors and the Rangpur Riders, in the Bangladesh Premier League. This rivalry is often referred to as the "North Bengal Derby". Both teams have won the BPL trophy once. Rajshahi has reached the playoffs a total of four times, while Rangpur has also made it to the playoffs four times.

=== BPL Clásico ===
The Dhaka-Comilla rivalry was a cricket rivalry between two franchises, Dhaka Capitals and Comilla Victorians, in the Bangladesh Premier League (BPL), known as the BPL Clásico. They are the two most successful teams in BPL, winning a combined 7 titles out of the 10 BPL seasons. Dhaka and Comilla have historically engaged in some of the most iconic clashes in the BPL. It is considered to be the biggest and most iconic match in Bangladeshi domestic cricket. Dhaka Capitals and Comilla Victorians produced some intense nail-bitting clashes. BPL Clásico is the oldest domestic cricket rivalry in Bangladesh. Many legendary cricketers have played for both teams. Some notable players are Shakib Al Hasan, Tamim Iqbal, Mashrafe Bin Mortaza, Andre Russell, Kiron Pollard, Shahid Afridi.

=== North-South Derby ===
The Barishal-Rangpur rivalry was a cricket rivalry between the BPL teams of Fortune Barishal and Rangpur Riders in the Bangladesh Premier League. It is the biggest rivalry of the BPL and is often referred to as the North-South Derby of the Bangladesh Premier League. The Shakib and Tamim incident started the hype of the rivalry and is still constant. The rivalry became more intense during the 2024 Bangladesh Premier League faceoff between the two teams in the playoff round. Rangpur won 1 title and played playoffs 4 times. On the other hand, Barishal played in the final 5 times and won 2 times; it also played playoffs 1 time in BPL.

=== East-West Derby ===
The Rajshahi-Chattogram rivalry is a cricket rivalry between the BPL teams of Rajshahi Warriors and Chattogram Royals, known as the East-West Derby. The rivalry is also referred to as the Padma-Karnaphuli Derby due to geographical reasons.

== Sponsorship ==
For the first season of the tournament, Bangladeshi conglomerate Destiny Group was the main sponsor of the tournament, negotiating a one-year sponsorship package for 75 million taka (US$1.0 million). Prime Bank Limited was awarded the sponsorship deal for the second season for 100 million taka (US$1.5 million). BRB Cables Limited held the sponsorship rights for the third season in 2015 with 150 million taka (US$2.0 million). Abul Khair Steel (AKS), a sister concern group of Abul Khair Industries Limited, became the title sponsor of the fourth and fifth editions.

Season	Sponsorship rights	Gross revenues Earned	Broadcasting rights
2012	Destiny Group ৳7.5 crore (US$610,000)	৳35.47 crore (US$2.9 million)	Channel Nine ৳63.2 crore (US$5.2 million) four-year broadcasting rights (2012–16)
2013	Prime Bank Limited ৳10 crore (US$810,000)	৳30.2 crore (US$2.5 million)	Channel Nine ৳63.2 crore (US$5.2 million) four-year broadcasting rights (2012–16)
2015–16	BRB Cables Industries Limited ৳15 crore (US$1.2 million)	৳26.65 crore (US$2.2 million)	Channel Nine ৳63.2 crore (US$5.2 million) four-year broadcasting rights (2012–16)
2016–17	Abul Khair Steel (AKS) and Shah Cement ৳22 crore (US$1.8 million)	৳43.3 crore (US$3.5 million) (2016–17)	Channel Nine ৳63.2 crore (US$5.2 million) four-year broadcasting rights (2012–16)
2016–17	Abul Khair Steel (AKS) and Shah Cement ৳22 crore (US$1.8 million)	Unpublished	GTV and Maasranga ৳64 crore (US$5.2 million) three-year broadcasting rights (2017–2019)
2019	United Commercial Bank (UCB) and TVS Motor Company	Unpublished	GTV and Maasranga ৳64 crore (US$5.2 million) three-year broadcasting rights (2017–2019)
2019	Akash DTH and TVS Motor Company	Unpublished	GTV and Maasranga ৳64 crore (US$5.2 million) three-year broadcasting rights (2017–2019)
2022	BBS Cables and Walton		GTV and T Sports
2023	Ispahani Limited and Minister Group ৳16 crore (US$1.3 million)	৳20 crore (US$1.6 million)	Nagorik TV ৳35 crore (US$2.9 million) broadcasting rights for 2023–25 edition
2024	Ispahani Limited and Minister Group ৳16 crore (US$1.3 million)		GTV and T Sports
2025	Dutch-Bangla Bank		GTV and T Sports

== Broadcasters ==
As of 2025 the competition is broadcast in a number of countries.

Location	TV channels	Digital streaming
Bangladesh	T Sports	RabbitholeBD; T Sports App; Nagorik
India	Zoom	FanCode
Pakistan	Ten Sports	Tapmad App
Sri Lanka	ThePapare TV HD	Dialog ViU
United Kingdom	Willow	Rabbithole YouTube
United States	Willow	
Southeast Asia		Cricbuzz
Middle East and North Africa		Cricbuzz
Rest of the world		Rabbithole YouTube

- Source: MyKhel

== See also ==
- List of Bangladesh Premier League records and statistics
