= 2012 Bangladesh Premier League final =

2012 Bangladesh Premier League Final
- Event: 2012 Bangladesh Premier League
Barisal Burners	Dhaka Gladiators
140/7	144/2
20 overs	15.4 overs
- Date: 29 February 2012
- Venue: Sher-e-Bangla National Cricket Stadium, Dhaka
- Player of the match: Imran Nazir (Dhaka Gladiators)
- Umpires: Enamul Haque (BAN); Dave Orchard (AUS)

The 2012 Bangladesh Premier League Final was a day/night Twenty20 cricket match played between the Dhaka Gladiators and the Barisal Burners on 29 February 2012 at the Sher-e-Bangla National Cricket Stadium, Dhaka. The final was to determine the winner of the 2012 Bangladesh Premier League, a professional Twenty20 cricket league in Bangladesh. The Gladiators defeated the Burners by eight wickets to bag the title of the inaugural season.

The Gladiators, captained by Mashrafe Mortaza, stood at the third position, whereas the Burners, led by Brad Hodge, stood at the fourth position after a controversial decision by the authority. They had defeated the Khulna Royal Bengals and the Duronto Rajshahi respectively in the semi-finals.

The total attendance of the match was 25800 (Reference from BCB).Winning the toss, Gladiators' captain Mashrafee Mortaza opted to field first. The Burners scored 140 runs in 20 overs with a loss of 7 wickets. Batting at opening, the captain Brad Hodge top scored for the Burners with a not out 70 runs . Gladiators' bowler Shahid Afridi took three wickets for 23 runs. The Gladiators failed to build a good opening partnership when their opener Nazimuddin got out at 26. However, the other opener Imran Nazir and Wicket-keeper Batsman Anamul Haque scored a quick 110 run partnership to take the match on their team. Gladiators reached the winning total with 26 balls to spare and earned the 2012 Bangladesh Premier League title. Nazir, who scored 75 run of 43 ball with 6 fours and 6 sixes to ease his team's way for the title, was named the man of the match.

== Route to the final ==
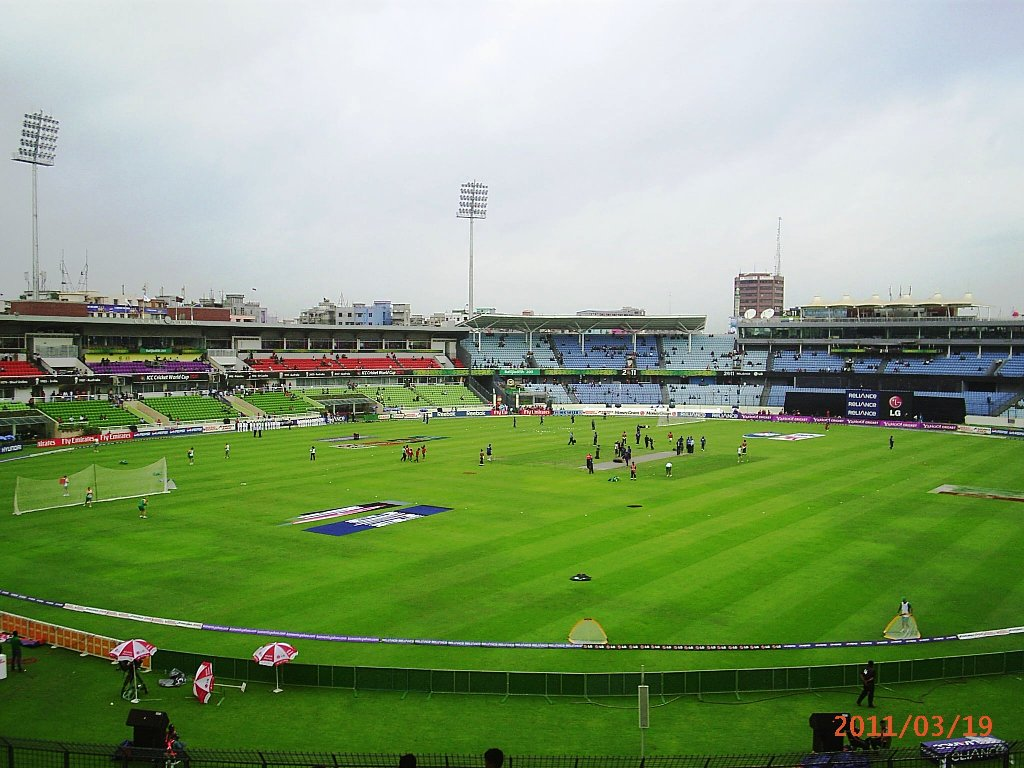
The venue of the final was Sher-e-Bangla National Cricket Stadium which also hosted the majority numbers of league stage match.

=== Group stage ===
The Burners started its campaign with two consecutive wins including the win by 10 wickets against Sylhet Royals at the first ever BPL match, but lost its next three matches to the Royal Bengals, the Gladiators and the Chittagong Kings. It qualified for the semifinals after winning three of its last five league matches. However, in the first place Burners were declared eliminated despite their win over Kings at their last league stage match. But after a huge confusion they were controversially declared as the fourth semi-finalist at the match day. The Gladiators lost its first match in the league stage to the Royal Bengal. However, it won all of its next three matches. Then, it suffered two consecutive defeats against the Duronto Rajshahi and Royal Bengals. But it won two of its last four matches to qualify the finals. Gladiators qualified for the semis despite losing its last match against Rajshahi by the virtue of higher net run rate.

The two teams faced each other in two matches of the group stage, both of which were won by the Gladiators.

Group stage procession
Team	Group matches									
Team	1	2	3	4	5	6	7	8	9	10
Barisal Burners	2	4	4	4	4	6	6	8	8	10
Dhaka Gladiators	0	2	4	6	6	6	8	8	10	10

Won	Lost

Note: The points at the end of each group match are listed.
Note: Click on the points to see the summary for the match.

=== Semi-finals ===
The Burners played the Duronto in the first semi-final. The Burners won the toss and decided to field first. The Duronto lost three wickets in three runs. Its middle-order batsmen Sean Ervine and Mushfiqur Rahim scored 82 and 58 runs respectively and Abdul Razzak posted a cameo of 30 to help it amass 184 runs for the loss of 6 wickets. Batting second, the Burners scored 103 at the opening partnership before their captain Brad Hodge got out after scoring 33. But Ahmed Shehzad scored an unbeaten knock of 116 off just 49 balls to take Burners 189 for 2 with 24 balls to spare. Shehzad was also awarded man of the match for his innings of 116 runs.

In the second semi-final, Gladiators played the Royal Bengals. The Gladiators won the toss and elected to bat first. They lost two early wickets. But contributions from Imran Nazir, Azhar Mahmood and Mohammad Ashraful kept the score going for Dhaka Gladiators. They scored 41, 65 and 47* respectively. Finally a cameo of 27 off 11 balls from Shahid Afridi took the score to 191 for 4 after 20 overs. In reply, Royal Bengals lost its first wicket when Herschelle Gibbs were dismissed for 2 runs. They lost 3 more wickets inside 50 runs. Then the skipper Shakib Al Hasan fought back against the fall out of wickets. But his unbeaten 86 off 41 balls went in vain as no one could contribute bigger. Royal Bengals' innings ended at 182 for 7. The Gladiators won the match by nine runs, and Azhar Mahmood was given the man of the match award.
