= 2012 Bangladesh Premier League =

Cricket Tournament

- 2012 BPL Logo
- Dates: 10 February 2012 – 29 February 2012
- Administrator: Bangladesh Cricket Board
- Cricket format: Twenty20
- Tournament format(s): Double round-robin and knockout
- Host: Bangladesh
- Champions: Dhaka Gladiators (1st title)
- Runners-up: Barisal Burners
- Participants: 6
- Matches: 33
- Player of the series: Shakib Al Hasan (Khulna Royal Bengals)
- Most runs: Ahmed Shehzad (Barisal Burners) (486)
- Most wickets: Elias Sunny (Dhaka Gladiators); Mohammad Sami (Duronto Rajshahi) (17 wickets each)
- Official website: BPL

The 2012 Bangladesh Premier League, also known as Destiny-Boishakhi BPL 2012 (for sponsorship reasons), was the inaugural season of the Bangladesh Premier League (BPL) established by the Bangladesh Cricket Board (BCB). The competition featured six franchises and used a tournament format with a double round robin group stage followed by two semi-finals and a final. The season began on 9 February with the final played on 29 February. The competition was won by Dhaka Gladiators.

Matches were held in Dhaka and Chittagong. The six franchises represented Dhaka, Barisal, Chittagong, Khulna, Rajshahi and Sylhet divisions. The franchise auction was held on 10 January and the player auction took place on 18 and 19 January.

== Opening ceremony ==
The President of Bangladesh Zillur Rahman launched the tournament during an opening ceremony held at the Sher-e-Bangla Cricket Stadium in Dhaka on 9 February 2012. The ceremony featured dancers, actors and singers and ended with fireworks and a laser lighting display.

== Venues ==
A total of 33 matches, including the semi-finals and final, were held at two venues in Chittagong and Dhaka. The Bir Shreshtho Flight Lieutenant Matiur Rahman Cricket Stadium in Chittagong hosted eight matches, with the majority of matches, including all playoff matches and the final, being held at the Sher-e-Bangla National Cricket Stadium in Mirpur, Dhaka.

== Sponsors ==
Bangladeshi group Destiny and the Boishakhi TV channel were the title sponsors of the tournament, paying Tk. 7.50 crore to earn that right. Other sponsors included the Bangladesh Tourism Board, United Airways and Islami Bank Bangladesh Ltd. Channel 9 was the main broadcaster for the tournament. The management partner was Game On, an Indian sports company, which organised the logistics of the tournament.

== Controversies ==
=== Match fixing ===
BPL 2012 had its first brush with controversy before the tournament began. Mashrafe Mortaza, captain of the Dhaka Gladiators, informed his team management of a potential spot-fixing approach by another player. Gladiators media manager Minhaz Uddin Khan said the franchise informed the BPL of the approach, and an ICC ACSU officer arrived in Dhaka to investigate the matter.

=== Overdue payments ===
The league had agreed to pay the players in three instalments through the tournament: 25% at the outset, 50% during, and the remainder at the end. A series of financial irregularities arose which left many of the overseas players out of pocket after the tournament ended. Some had received only the first 25%. Most eventually were eventually paid in full, except players from Pakistan who were still awaiting theirs in April 2012.

=== Semi final confusion ===
The first semi-final of the BPL had the team that finished first in the league playing the team that finished fourth. Duronto Rajshahi finished first, with 14 points, but until 2.00 am on the morning of the semi-final, it wasn't clear who was being placed fourth, a cause of great confusion.

Initially, it was announced that Barisal Burners were through to the semis, after their victory against Chittagong Kings, on the basis of net run-rate. At that point, the other two spots were going to be contested between Chittagong, Khulna Royal Bengals, and Dhaka Gladiators. The next day, after Dhaka lost narrowly to Rajshahi and Khulna beat Sylhet Royals, Khulna moved into second place with 12 points, leaving Dhaka, Barisal, and Chittagong tied on 10 points at the end of the league phase. In the head-to-head results between the three teams, Dhaka had beaten Barisal twice and Chittagong once. They also had a superior net-run rate and this qualified them for the semi-finals in third place. That left Chittagong and Barisal in contention for the fourth spot.

It was initially announced that Chittagong had qualified for the semi-finals ahead of Barisal, apparently on the basis of a better head-to-head record in the three-way tie on 10 points, which included Dhaka. At 2.45 am on the day of semi-final, however, the BPL issued a release announcing Barisal as the fourth semi-finalist because of their better head-to-head record with Chittagong alone. The BPL stated that the turnaround was necessary for due compliance with tie-break conditions in the tournament rules and regulations.

Reporter Mohammad Isam pointed out that the upshot of the unnecessary confusion was to grant Rajshahi ample time in which to prepare mentally for the semi-final, while their opponents were "left in limbo until the wee hours of the morning".

== Player auction ==
Players were assigned to franchises at a player auction, held in Dhaka on 19 January 2012. Each franchise was allowed to sign 18 players, including up to eight non-Bangladeshi players. A maximum of five overseas players could have been played in each matches.

== Format ==
Each franchise played ten matches in the group stage of the competition, playing twice against every other team. The top four teams qualified for the semi-final stage.

The tournament rules stated that if a match ended with the scores tied that a super over would be used to decide the match. If more than one team ended the group stage of the competition on the same number of points the regulations said that the teams would be ranked using the criteria:

1. Higher number of wins
2. If still equal, net run rate
3. If still equal, lower bowling strike rate

== Group stage ==
During the group stage of the tournament Duronto Rajshahi won seven of their ten matches and finished top of the league table with Khulna Royal Bengals, who won six matches, finishing second. Three teams, Barisal Burners, Chittagong Kings and Dhaka Gladiators, all finished with five wins and ten points. The tournament regulations stated that if teams finished level on points and had each won the same number of matches, that net run rate would be used to decide the rankings for teams. After some confusion, Dhaka Gladiators were placed third in the group stage followed by Barisal Burners, with Chittagoing Kings eliminated from the competition.

Pos	Team	Pld	W	L	NR	Pts	NRR	Qualification
1	Duronto Rajshahi	10	7	3	0	14	0.114	Advanced to the knockout stage
2	Khulna Royal Bengals	10	6	4	0	12	0.606	Advanced to the knockout stage
3	Dhaka Gladiators (C)	10	5	5	0	10	0.210	Advanced to the knockout stage
4	Barisal Burners (R)	10	5	5	0	10	0.178	Advanced to the knockout stage
5	Chittagong Kings	10	5	5	0	10	0.078	
6	Sylhet Royals	10	2	8	0	4	−1.234	

(C) Champions; (R) Runners-up

Note: The top four teams advanced to the semi-finals.

=== Group stage fixtures ===
10 February
14:00
Scorecard

Sylhet Royals; 165/4 (20 overs)	v	Barisal Burners; 167/0 (13.1 overs)
Peter Trego 62 (54); Yasir Arafat 2/33 (4 overs)		Chris Gayle 101* (44)

Barisal won by 10 wickets
Sher-e-Bangla Cricket Stadium, Dhaka
Umpires: Anisur Rahman and Dave Orchard
Player of the match: Chris Gayle (Barisal)

- Barisal Burners won the toss and elected to field.

10 February
18:30 (D/N)
Scorecard

Chittagong Kings; 206/4 (20 overs)	v	Duronto Rajshahi; 153 (19.5 overs)
Nasir Jamshed 56 (38); Qaiser Abbas 1/14 (2 overs)		Junaid Siddique 42 (23); Dwayne Bravo 3/17 (3 overs)

Chittagong won by 53 runs
Sher-e-Bangla Cricket Stadium, Dhaka
Umpires: Jeremy Lloyds and Sharfuddoula
Player of the match: Dwayne Bravo (Chittagong)

- Chittagong Kings won the toss and elected to bat.

11 February
14:00
Scorecard

Khulna Royal Bengals; 175/5 (20 overs)	v	Dhaka Gladiators; 156/7 (20 overs)
Shakib Al Hasan 42 (31); Azhar Mahmood 2/20 (4 overs)		Kieron Pollard 39* (32); Andre Russell 4/35 (4 overs)

Khulna won by 19 runs
Sher-e-Bangla Cricket Stadium, Dhaka
Umpires: Jeremy Lloyds and Sharfuddoula
Player of the match: Andre Russell (Khulna)

- Khulna Royal Bengals won the toss and elected to bat.

11 February
18:30 (D/N)
Scorecard

Barisal Burners; 180/2 (20 overs)	v	Duronto Rajshahi; 158/9 (20 overs)
Ahmed Shehzad 67 (40); Marlon Samuels 1/22 (4 overs)		Mizanur Rahman 65 (52); Shane Harwood 2/20 (3.2 overs)

Barisal won by 22 runs
Sher-e-Bangla Cricket Stadium, Dhaka
Umpires: Gazi Sohel and Dave Orchard
Player of the match: Ahmed Shehzad (Barisal)

- Barisal Burners won the toss and elected to bat.

12 February
14:00
Scorecard

Khulna Royal Bengals; 171/3 (20 overs)	v	Chittagong Kings; 174/4 (19.1 overs)
Shivnarine Chanderpaul 59 (50); Mahmudullah 2/18 (3 overs)		Nasir Jamshed 86* (47); Abdur Razzak 2/7 (2 overs)

Chittagong won by 6 wickets
Sher-e-Bangla Cricket Stadium, Dhaka
Umpires: Enamul Haque and Dave Orchard
Player of the match: Nasir Jamshed (Chittagong)

- Khulna Royal Bengals won the toss and elected to bat.

12 February
18:30 (D/N)
Scorecard

Sylhet Royals; 124 (19.5 overs)	v	Dhaka Gladiators; 126/3 (18.2 overs)
Naeem Islam 30 (24); Mashrafe Mortaza 2/22 (4 overs)		Anamul Haque 48 (39); Brad Hogg 1/19 (4 overs)

Dhaka won by 7 wickets
Sher-e-Bangla Cricket Stadium, Dhaka
Umpires: Jeremy Lloyds and Sharfuddoula
Player of the match: Anamul Haque (Dhaka)

- Sylhet Royals won the toss and elected to bat.

13 February
14:00
Scorecard

Barisal Burners; 125 (20 overs)	v	Khulna Royal Bengals; 131/3 (17.2 overs)
Mominul Haque 42 (24); Shafiul Islam 2/7 (3 overs)		Dwayne Smith 58* (41); Suhrawadi Shuvo 2/20 (3 overs)

Khulna won by 7 wickets
Sher-e-Bangla Cricket Stadium, Dhaka
Umpires: Enamul Haque and Jeremy Lloyds
Player of the match: Dwayne Smith (Khulna)

- Khulna Royal Bengals won the toss and elected to field.

13 February
18:30 (D/N)
Scorecard

Chittagong Kings; 153/6 (20 overs)	v	Dhaka Gladiators; 156/4 (19 overs)
Dwayne Bravo 43 (31); Elias Sunny 3/17 (4 overs)		Kieron Pollard 50* (34); Arafat Sunny 2/12 (4 overs)

Dhaka won by 6 wickets
Sher-e-Bangla Cricket Stadium, Dhaka
Umpires: Dave Orchard and Sharfuddoula
Player of the match: Kieron Pollard (Dhaka)

- Chittagong Kings won the toss and elected to bat.

14 February
14:00
Scorecard

Duronto Rajshahi; 171/8 (20 overs)	v	Sylhet Royals; 155/4 (20 overs)
Marlon Samuels 72 (48); Alok Kapali 3/27 (2 overs)		Kamran Akmal 56 (41); Fawad Alam 1/15 (2 overs)

Rajshahi won by 16 runs
Sher-e-Bangla Cricket Stadium, Dhaka
Umpires: Enamul Haque and Dave Orchard
Player of the match: Marlon Samuels (Duronto)

- Duronto Rajshahi won the toss and elected to bat.

14 February
18:30 (D/N)
Scorecard

Dhaka Gladiators; 208/5 (20 overs)	v	Barisal Burners; 187/5 (20 overs)
Azhar Mahmood 77* (47); Yasir Arafat 2/30 (4 overs)		Chris Gayle 116 (61); Mashrafe Mortaza 2/20 (4 overs)

Dhaka won by 21 runs
Sher-e-Bangla Cricket Stadium, Dhaka
Umpires: Jeremy Lloyds and Sharfuddoula
Player of the match: Azhar Mahmood (Dhaka)

- Barisal Burners won the toss and elected to field.

15 February
14:00
Scorecard

Sylhet Royals; 152/4 (20 overs)	v	Chittagong Kings; 154/3 (17.3 overs)
Kamran Akmal 54 (41); Farhad Reza 2/28 (4 overs)		Mahmudullah 56* (38); Sohail Tanvir 1/16 (3 overs)

Chittagong won by 7 wickets
Sher-e-Bangla Cricket Stadium, Dhaka
Umpires: Enamul Haque and Jeremy Lloyds
Player of the match: Mahmudullah (Chittagong)

- Sylhet Royals won the toss and elected to bat.

15 February
18:30 (D/N)
Scorecard

Khulna Royal Bengals; 145/7 (20 overs)	v	Duronto Rajshahi; 146/4 (19.1 overs)
Shakib Al Hasan 44 (26); Abdul Razzaq 2/26 (4 overs)		Shahzaib Hasan 52 (46); Shakib Al Hasan 2/35 (4 overs)

Rajshahi won by 6 wickets
Sher-e-Bangla Cricket Stadium, Dhaka
Umpires: Masudur Rahman and Dave Orchard
Player of the match: Mushfiqur Rahim (Duronto)

- Khulna Royal Bengals won the toss and elected to bat.

16 February
14:00
Scorecard

Barisal Burners; 125/6 (20 overs)	v	Chittagong Kings; 126/2 (12.4 overs)
Brad Hodge 38 (40); Enamul Haque Jr 2/12 (2 overs)		Nasir Jamshed 81* (47); Brad Hodge 1/25 (2 overs)

Chittagong won by 8 wickets
Sher-e-Bangla Cricket Stadium, Dhaka
Umpires: Enamul Haque and Dave Orchard
Player of the match: Nasir Jamshed (Chittagong)

- Chittagong Kings won the toss and elected to field.

16 February
18:30 (D/N)
Scorecard

Duronto Rajshahi; 144/9 (20 overs)	v	Dhaka Gladiators; 130/7 (20 overs)
Marlon Samuels 36 (38); Elias Sunny 2/18 (4 overs)		Imran Nazir 54* (45); Mohammad Sami 3/23 (4 overs)

Rajshahi won by 14 runs
Sher-e-Bangla Cricket Stadium, Dhaka
Umpires: Jeremy Lloyds and Sharfuddoula
Player of the match: Marlon Samuels (Duronto)

- Dhaka Gladiators won the toss and elected to field.

18 February
14:00
Scorecard

Khulna Royal Bengals; 171/6 (20 overs)	v	Sylhet Royals; 169/8 (20 overs)
Dwayne Smith 55 (31); Sohail Tanvir 2/25 (4 overs)		Kamran Akmal 82 (41); Abdur Razzak 2/24 (3 overs)

Khulna won by 2 runs
Zahur Ahmed Chowdhury Stadium, Chittagong
Umpires: Enamul Haque and Jeremy Lloyds
Player of the match: Andre Russell (Khulna)

- Sylhet Royals won the toss and elected to field.

18 February
18:30 (D/N)
Scorecard

Duronto Rajshahi; 126/6 (20 overs)	v	Chittagong Kings; 117/9 (20 overs)
Mushfiqur Rahim 24* (25); Arafat Sunny 3/13 (4 overs)		Shamsur Rahman 24 (22); Saqlain Sajib 3/22 (4 overs)

Rajshahi won by 9 runs
Zahur Ahmed Chowdhury Stadium, Chittagong
Umpires: Dave Orchard and Sharfuddoula
Player of the match: Saqlain Sajib (Duronto)

- Duronto Rajshahi won the toss and elected to bat.

19 February
14:00
Scorecard

Dhaka Gladiators; 140/8 (20 overs)	v	Khulna Royal Bengals; 141/3 (16.4 overs)
Mohammad Ashraful 53 (42); Sanath Jayasuriya 2/25 (4 overs)		Shivnarine Chanderpaul 87* (49); Azhar Mahmood 1/12 (2 overs)

Khulna won by 7 wickets
Zahur Ahmed Chowdhury Stadium, Chittagong
Umpires: Dave Orchard and Sharfuddoula
Player of the match: Shivnarine Chanderpaul (Khulna)

- Dhaka Gladiators won the toss and elected to bat.

19 February
18:30 (D/N)
Scorecard

Sylhet Royals; 120/7 (20 overs)	v	Barisal Burners; 121/1 (13.2 overs)
Sohail Tanvir 33 (32); Suhrawadi Shuvo 3/20 (4 overs)		Ahmed Shehzad 60 (40); Brad Hogg 1/16 (4 overs)

Barisal won by 9 wickets
Zahur Ahmed Chowdhury Stadium, Chittagong
Umpires: Enamul Haque and Jeremy Lloyds
Player of the match: Brad Hodge (Barisal)

- Sylhet Royals won the toss and elected to bat.

20 February
14:00
Scorecard

Barisal Burners; 192/3 (20 overs)	v	Duronto Rajshahi; 193/1 (17.1 overs)
Phil Mustard 88* (58); Sabbir Rahman 1/18 (2 overs)		Junaid Siddique 89* (51); Ahmed Shehzad 1/26 (3 overs)

Rajshahi won by 9 wickets
Zahur Ahmed Chowdhury Stadium, Chittagong
Umpires: Enamul Haque and Jeremy Lloyds
Player of the match: Junaid Siddique (Duronto)

- Barisal Burners won the toss and elected to bat.

20 February
18:30 (D/N)
Scorecard

Khulna Royal Bengals; 137/6 (20 overs)	v	Chittagong Kings; 93 (18.1 overs)
Nasir Hossain 42 (38); Enamul Haque Jr 3/22 (4 overs)		Jason Roy 30 (24); Marshall Ayub 4/20 (4 overs)

Khulna won by 44 runs
Zahur Ahmed Chowdhury Stadium, Chittagong
Umpires: Dave Orchard and Sharfuddoula
Player of the match: Nasir Hossain (Khulna)

- Chittagong Kings won the toss and elected to field.

22 February
14:00
Scorecard

Sylhet Royals; 128/7 (20 overs)	v	Dhaka Gladiators; 132/2 (12.5 overs)
Peter Trego 35 (33); Rana Naved-ul-Hasan 3/18 (3 overs)		Mohammad Ashraful 40 (33); Noor Hossain 1/21 (2.5 overs)

Dhaka won by 8 wickets
Zahur Ahmed Chowdhury Stadium, Chittagong
Umpires: Dave Orchard and Sharfuddoula
Player of the match: Azhar Mahmood (Dhaka)

- Dhaka Gladiators won the toss and elected to field.

22 February
18:30 (D/N)
Scorecard

Khulna Royal Bengals; 161/7 (20 overs)	v	Barisal Burners; 162/6 (19.3 overs)
Nazmul Hossain Milon 42* (31); Nazmul Islam 1/16 (4 overs)		Mominul Haque 53* (28); Abdur Razzak 2/22 (4 overs)

Barisal won by 4 wickets
Zahur Ahmed Chowdhury Stadium, Chittagong
Umpires: Enamul Haque and Jeremy Lloyds
Player of the match: Mominul Haque (Barisal)

- Khulna Royal Bengals won the toss and elected to bat.

24 February
14:00
Scorecard

Chittagong Kings; 120/6 (20 overs)	v	Dhaka Gladiators; 107/9 (20 overs)
Dwayne Bravo 48* (43); Elias Sunny 3/23 (4 overs)		Anamul Haque 22 (22); Kevon Cooper 3/13 (4 overs)

Chittagong won by 13 runs
Sher-e-Bangla Cricket Stadium, Dhaka
Umpires: Nadir Shah and Dave Orchard
Player of the match: Dwayne Bravo (Chittagong)

- Dhaka Gladiators won the toss and elected to bat.

24 February
18:30 (D/N)
Scorecard

Duronto Rajshahi; 124/9 (20 overs)	v	Sylhet Royals; 125/1 (16.3 overs)
Shahzaib Hasan 54 (46); Sohail Tanvir 4/13 (4 overs)		Kamran Akmal 72* (51); Saqlain Sajib 1/22 (4 overs)

Sylhet won by 9 wickets
Sher-e-Bangla Cricket Stadium, Dhaka
Umpires: Anisur Rahman and Jeremy Lloyds
Player of the match: Sohail Tanvir (Sylhet)

- Sylhet Royals won the toss and elected to field.
- Attendance: 21,240

25 February
14:00
Scorecard

Barisal Burners; 156/6 (20 overs)	v	Dhaka Gladiators; 160/5 (18.2 overs)
Ahmed Shehzad 51 (39); Rana Naved-ul-Hasan 2/22 (4 overs)		Imran Nazir 65 (40); Kabir Ali 2/18 (3.2 overs)

Dhaka won by 5 wickets
Sher-e-Bangla Cricket Stadium, Dhaka
Umpires: Jeremy Lloyds and Nadir Shah
Player of the match: Imran Nazir (Dhaka)

- Dhaka Gladiators won the toss and elected to field.

25 February
18:30 (D/N)
Scorecard

Sylhet Royals; 165/3 (20 overs)	v	Chittagong Kings; 130/8 (20 overs)
Peter Trego 68* (53); Dwayne Bravo 1/27 (4 overs)		Ziaur Rahman 40 (28); Sohail Tanvir 3/18 (4 overs)

Sylhet won by 35 runs
Sher-e-Bangla Cricket Stadium, Dhaka
Umpires: Masudur Rahman and Dave Orchard
Player of the match: Peter Trego (Sylhet)

- Chittagong Kings won the toss and elected to field.

26 February
14:00
Scorecard

Khulna Royal Bengals; 106 (19.5 overs)	v	Duronto Rajshahi; 110/2 (14.1 overs)
Niall O'Brien 35 (39); Mohammad Sami 3/16 (3.5 overs)		Marlon Samuels 50 (38); Nazmul Hossain Milon 1/8 (1.1 overs)

Rajshahi won by 8 wickets
Sher-e-Bangla Cricket Stadium, Dhaka
Umpires: Nadir Shah and Dave Orchard
Player of the match: Sean Ervine (Duronto)

- Khulna Royal Bengals won the toss and elected to bat.

26 February
18:30 (D/N)
Scorecard

Chittagong Kings; 150/9 (20 overs)	v	Barisal Burners; 151/5 (15 overs)
Jason Roy 42 (25); Yasir Arafat 3/25 (4 overs)		Brad Hodge 67 (36); Arafat Sunny 2/21 (4 overs)

Barisal won by 5 wickets
Sher-e-Bangla Cricket Stadium, Dhaka
Umpires: Gazi Sohel and Jeremy Lloyds
Player of the match: Brad Hodge (Barisal)

- Barisal Burners won the toss and chose to field.

27 February
14:00
Scorecard

Dhaka Gladiators; 116 (18.2 overs)	v	Duronto Rajshahi; 120/7 (19.3 overs)
Darren Stevens 28 (16); Mohammad Sami 5/6 (3.2 overs)		Mushfiqur Rahim 40* (37); Rana Naved-ul-Hasan 2/19 (4 overs)

Rajshahi won by 3 wickets
Sher-e-Bangla Cricket Stadium, Dhaka
Umpires: Mahfuzur Rahman and Nadir Shah
Player of the match: Mohammad Sami (Duronto)

- Dhaka Gladiators won the toss and elected to bat.

27 February
18:30 (D/N)
Scorecard

Khulna Royal Bengals; 186/2 (20 overs)	v	Sylhet Royals; 117 (16 overs)
Dwayne Smith 103* (73); Scott Styris 1/21 (4 overs)		Sohail Tanvir 26* (24); Abdur Razzak 2/8 (2 overs)

Khulna won by 69 runs
Sher-e-Bangla Cricket Stadium, Dhaka
Umpires: Dave Orchard and Tanvir Ahmed
Player of the match: Dwayne Smith (Khulna)

- Sylhet Royals won the toss and elected to field.

== Knockout stage ==
The organisers of the tournament caused some controversy after the broadcasters awarded the final semifinal spot on air to the Barisal Burners based on their superior net run rate over the Chittagong Kings, both of which were tied on the same number of points with only one of the two to progress to the next round. The following day (27 February 2011) officials from the Bangladesh Premier League confirmed that Chittagong Kings would progress to the next round, in place of the Burners, due to a better head-to-head record. Later that day the officials retracted their initial decision and replaced the Kings with the Burners as the 4th placed team based on their superior net run rate.

Semifinals
1	Duronto Rajshahi	184/6
4	Barisal Burners	189/2
3	Dhaka Gladiators	191/4
2	Khulna Royal Bengals	182/7

Finals
4	Barisal Burners	140/7
3	Dhaka Gladiators	144/2

=== Semi-finals ===
28 February
14:00
Scorecard

Duronto Rajshahi; 184/6 (20 overs)	v	Barisal Burners; 189/2 (16 overs)
Sean Ervine 82 (61); Yasir Arafat 3/30 (4 overs)		Ahmed Shehzad 113* (49); Sabbir Rahman 1/9 (1 over)

Barisal won by 8 wickets
Sher-e-Bangla Cricket Stadium, Dhaka
Umpires: Dave Orchard and Sharfuddoula
Player of the match: Ahmed Shehzad (Barisal)

- Barisal Burners won the toss and elected to field.

28 February
18:30 (D/N)
Scorecard

Dhaka Gladiators; 191/4 (20 overs)	v	Khulna Royal Bengals; 182/7 (20 overs)
Azhar Mahmood 65 (39); Hammad Azam 1/29 (3 overs)		Shakib Al Hasan 86* (41); Elias Sunny 3/29 (4 overs)

Dhaka won by 9 runs
Sher-e-Bangla Cricket Stadium, Dhaka
Umpires: Enamul Haque and Nadir Shah
Player of the match: Azhar Mahmood (Dhaka)

- Dhaka Gladiators won the toss and elected to bat.

=== Final ===
29 February
18:00 (D/N)
Scorecard

Barisal Burners; 140/7 (20 overs)	v	Dhaka Gladiators; 144/2 (15.4 overs)
Brad Hodge 70* (51); Shahid Afridi 3/23 (4 overs)		Imran Nazir 75 (43); Alauddin Babu 1/9 (2 overs)

Dhaka won by 8 wickets
Sher-e-Bangla Cricket Stadium, Dhaka
Umpires: Dave Orchard and Enamul Haque
Player of the match: Imran Nazir (Dhaka)

- Dhaka Gladiators won the toss and elected to field.

== See also ==
- 2012 Bangladesh Premier League squads
