= 2016 Bangladesh Premier League final =

2016 Bangladesh Premier League Final
- Event: 2016 Bangladesh Premier League
Dhaka Dynamites	Rajshahi Kings
159/9	103
20 overs	17.4 overs
- Dhaka Dynamites won by 56 runs
- Date: 9 December 2016
- Venue: Sher-e-Bangla National Cricket Stadium, Dhaka
- Player of the match: Kumar Sangakkara (Dhaka Dynamites)
- Umpires: Khalid Mahmood; Mahfuzur Rahman
- Attendance: 25,000

The 2016 Bangladesh Premier League Final was a day/night Twenty20 cricket match played between the Dhaka Dynamites and the Rajshahi Kings on 9 December 2016 at the Sher-e-Bangla National Cricket Stadium, Dhaka. The final would determine the winner of the 2016 Bangladesh Premier League, a professional Twenty20 cricket league in Bangladesh. It ended with the Dynamites defeating the Kings by 56 runs.

The Dynamites, captained by Shakib Al Hasan, topped the group stage table, whereas the Kings, led by Darren Sammy, stood at the fourth position. Dynamites beat Khulna Titans in the Qualifier 1 and went to final. Kings defeated Chittagong Vikings and Khulna Titans respectively in Eliminator and Qualifier 2 of semi-finals and went to final. 2016 BPL Live broadcast on Channel9.

The total attendance of the match was 24300 (Reference from BCB).Winning the toss, Kings' captain Sammy elected to field first. The Dynamites scored 159 runs in 20 overs with a loss of 9 wickets. They made 23 runs in the opening partnership. Evin Lewis top scored for the Dynamites with 45 runs. Kings' bowler Farhad Reza took 3 wickets for 28 runs. The Kings failed to build a good opening partnership. After scoring 60, they started losing wickets and couldn't hold on. The Dynamites won the match and their 1st title by a wide margin of 56 runs. Kumar Sangakkara was named the man of the match. This is the 3rd title for a Dhaka franchise in BPL.

Khulna Titans' skipper Mahmudullah was made the player of the tournament since he scored the second most runs and defended less than 7 runs in the last over of the 2nd innings more than one instance.

== Route to final ==
With 16 points from 12 matches (winning 8 and losing 4) Dhaka Dynamites topped the group and qualified for Qualifier 1. There they beat Khulna Titans by 54 runs and qualified for the final. From 12 mathes Rajshahi Kings won 6 matches and lost 6 matches hence with 12 points finished fourth on Net run rate and qualified for the Eliminator. Where they beat Chittagong Vikings by 3 wickets and qualified for the Qualifier 2. In that stage they beat Khulna Titans by 7 wickets and played the final.

=== Group stage ===
Team	Pld	W	L	T	NR	Pts	NRR
Dhaka Dynamites (C)	12	8	4	0	0	16	+0.912
Rajshahi Kings (R)	12	6	6	0	0	12	+0.208

=== Play-off ===
Semifinals
6 December 2016 — Sher-e-Bangla National Cricket Stadium, Dhaka
1	Dhaka Dynamites	140/8 (20 overs)
2	Khulna Titans	86 (16.2 overs)
6 December 2016 — Sher-e-Bangla National Cricket Stadium, Dhaka
3	Chittagong Vikings	142/8 (20 overs)
4	Rajshahi Kings	143/7 (18.3 overs)

Preliminary final
7 December 2016 — Sher-e-Bangla National Cricket Stadium, Dhaka
2	Khulna Titans	125/9 (20 overs)
4	Rajshahi Kings	129/3 (19.2 overs)

Final
9 December 2016 — Sher-e-Bangla National Cricket Stadium, Dhaka
1	Dhaka Dynamites	159/9 (20 overs)
4	Rajshahi Kings	103 (17.4 overs)

=== Eliminator ===
6 December 2016
13:00
Scorecard

Chittagong Vikings; 142/8 (20 overs)	v	Rajshahi Kings; 143/7 (18.3 overs)
Tamim Iqbal 51 (46); Kesrick Williams 4/11 (4 overs)		Darren Sammy 55 (27); Saqlain Sajib 2/24 (4 overs)

Rajshahi won by 3 wickets
Sher-e-Bangla National Cricket Stadium, Dhaka
Player of the match: Darren Sammy (Rajshahi Kings)

- Rajshahi Kings won the toss and elected to field.
- Rajshahi Kings advanced to Qualifier 2 and Chittagong Vikings are eliminated

=== Qualifier 1 ===
6 December 2016
17:45 (D/N)
Scorecard

Dhaka Dynamites; 140/8 (20 overs)	v	Khulna Titans; 86 (16.2 overs)
Andre Russell 46 (25); Junaid Khan 4/24 (4 overs)		Andre Fletcher 28 (22); Dwayne Bravo 3/10 (2.2 overs)

Dhaka won by 54 runs
Sher-e-Bangla National Cricket Stadium, Dhaka
Player of the match: Andre Russell (Dhaka Dynamites)

- Khulna Titans won the toss and elected to field.
- Dhaka Dynamites advanced to Final and Khulna Titans goes to Qualifier 2

=== Qualifier 2 ===
7 December 2016
17:45 (D/N)
Scorecard

Khulna Titans; 125/9 (20 overs)	v	Rajshahi Kings; 129/3 (19.2 overs)
Ariful Haque 32 (29); Samit Patel 3/19 (4 overs)		Sabbir Rahman 43* (52); Mahmudullah 1/10 (1.2 overs)

Rajshahi won by 7 wickets
Sher-e-Bangla National Cricket Stadium, Dhaka
Player of the match: Samit Patel (Rajshahi Kings)

- Khulna Titans won the toss and elected to bat.
- Rajshahi Kings advanced to the Final and Khulna Titans were eliminated
