= 2017–18 Bangladesh Premier League final =

2017 Bangladesh Premier League Final
- Event: 2017–18 Bangladesh Premier League
Rangpur Riders	Dhaka Dynamites
206/1	149/9
20 overs	20 overs
- Rangpur Riders won by 57 runs
- Date: 12 December 2017
- Venue: Sher-e-Bangla National Cricket Stadium, Dhaka
- Player of the match: Chris Gayle (Rangpur Riders)
- Umpires: Mahfuzur Rahman; Riazuddin

The 2017 Bangladesh Premier League Final was a day/night Twenty20 cricket match played between the Dhaka Dynamites and the Rangpur Riders on 12 December 2017 at the Sher-e-Bangla National Cricket Stadium, Dhaka. The match was to determine the winner of the 2017–18 Bangladesh Premier League, a professional Twenty20 cricket league in Bangladesh. It ended as Rangpur Riders defeating Dhaka Dynamites by 57 runs.

== Route to final ==
Dhaka was placed second on the league table with 15 points, though Rangpur was ranked fourth in the league stage with 12 points, as per NRR. Dhaka won 7 of their league stage matches, lost 4 and 1 resulted in no result due to rain. On the other hand, Rangpur both won and lost 6 matches. Dhaka won the qualifier 1 match and reached the final. Barisal won the eliminator and qualifier 2 one after one, booking their place in the final.

=== League stage ===
League stage progression
Team	League matches											
Team	1	2	3	4	5	6	7	8	9	10	11	12
[ Dhaka Dynamites	0	2	4	6	7	9	9	9	11	11	13	15
Rangpur Riders	2	2	2	2	4	6	6	8	10	10	12	12

Won	Lost

Note: The points at the end of each group match are listed.
Note: Click on the points to see the summary for the match.

=== Play-offs ===
Semifinals
8 December 2017 — Sher-e-Bangla National Stadium, Dhaka
1	Comilla Victorians	96 (18 overs)
2	[ Dhaka Dynamites	191/7 (20 overs)
8 December 2017 — Sher-e-Bangla National Stadium, Dhaka
3	Khulna Titans	167/6 (20 overs)
4	Rangpur Riders	171/2 (15.2 overs)

Preliminary final
10–11 December 2017 — Sher-e-Bangla National Stadium, Dhaka
1	Comilla Victorians	156 (20 overs)
4	Rangpur Riders	192/3 (20 overs)

Final
12 December 2017 — Sher-e-Bangla National Stadium, Dhaka
2	[ Dhaka Dynamites	149/9 (20 overs)
4	Rangpur Riders	206/1 (20 overs)

=== Preliminary ===
==== Eliminator ====
8 December 2017
2:00 pm
Scorecard

Khulna Titans; 167/6 (20 overs)	v	Rangpur Riders; 171/2 (15.2 overs)
Ariful Haque 29 (30); Lasith Malinga 2/49 (4 overs)		Chris Gayle 126* (51); Jofra Archer 2/30 (4 overs)

Rangpur won by 8 wickets
Sher-e-Bangla National Cricket Stadium, Dhaka
Umpires: Anisur Rahman (Ban) and Masudur Rahman (Ban)
Player of the match: Chris Gayle (Rangpur Riders)

- Rangpur Riders won the toss and elected to field.
- As a result of this match, Rangpur Riders advanced to Qualifier 2 and Khulna Titans are eliminated.

==== Qualifier 1 ====
8 December 2017
7:00 pm (D/N)
Scorecard

Dhaka Dynamites [ 191/7 (20 overs)	v	Comilla Victorians; 96 (18 overs)
Evin Lewis 47 (32); Hasan Ali 3/16 (4 overs)		Tamim Iqbal 31 (28); Shahid Afridi 3/16 (4 overs)

[ Dhaka won by 95 runs
Sher-e-Bangla National Cricket Stadium, Dhaka
Umpires: Mahfuzur Rahman (Ban) and Masudur Rahman (Ban)
Player of the match: Shahid Afridi (Dhaka Dynamites)

- Dhaka Dynamites won the toss and elected to bat.
- As a result of this match, Dhaka Dynamites advanced to the Final and Comilla Victorians qualified for Qualifier 2.

==== Qualifier 2 ====
10–11 December 2017
6:00 pm (D/N)
Scorecard

Rangpur Riders; 192/3 (20 overs)	v	Comilla Victorians; 156 (20 overs)
Johnson Charles 105* (63); Hasan Ali 1/23 (4 overs)		Liton Das 39 (28); Rubel Hossain 3/34 (4 overs)

Rangpur won by 36 runs
Sher-e-Bangla National Cricket Stadium, Dhaka
Umpires: Gazi Sohel (Ban) and Raveendra Wimalasiri (SL)
Player of the match: Johnson Charles (Rangpur Riders)

- Comilla Victorians won the toss and elected to field.
- Rain stop play when 7 overs of the 1st innings were completed which caused match to reschedule and begin from 11 December at 6:00 PM from where it was halted
- As a result of this match, Rangpur Riders advanced to the Final and Comilla Victorians are eliminated.
- Johnson Charles (Rangpur Riders) scored his maiden T20 century.

== Final ==
=== Background ===
The match is to be played at the home ground of Dhaka, Sher-e-Bangla National Cricket Stadium. Dhaka is appearing in their fourth final and have won the championship in all their previous finals. Rangpur is appearing in their first ever final match. Both teams were on even terms as they have won the matches against each other this season. The total attendance of the final match was 25792 (Reference from BCB)

=== Report ===
Dhaka won the toss and decided to bowl first. The decision was proving to be successful when they got rid of Johnson Charles early thanks to skipper Shakib Al Hasan. But after the 10th over, the partnership of Brendon McCullum and Chris Gayle proved to be devastating. Their partnership mainly consisted of boundaries and particularly Gayle, who hit a record 18 sixes. His score of 146 off 69 balls is the tournament highest. McCullum gave him a helping hand by scoring a decent 51 off 43. The Rangpur innings thus ended as 206 for 1.

The second innings started with Dhaka quickly losing wickets. At a time they 87 for 7 due to the excellent bowling by Rangpur bowlers. Jahurul Islam provided some resistance with his 50 off 38 balls. But soon wickets tumbled down and Dhaka innings came to an end with 149/9, handing Rangpur 57 runs victory and also the championship.

=== Summary ===
Chris Gayle was awarded as the man of the match for his aforementioned innings and also won the man of the series award. The highest run scorer award was also awarded to him and the most wicket taker award was given to Shakib Al Hasan.
