= 2021–22 Bangladesh Premier League final =

Championship match of the 2021–22 Bangladesh Premier League season

2021–22 Bangladesh Premier League Final
- Event: 2021–22 Bangladesh Premier League
Comilla Victorians	Fortune Barishal
151/9	150/8
20 overs	20 overs
- Comilla Victorians won by 1 run
- Date: 18 February 2022
- Venue: Sher-e-Bangla National Cricket Stadium, Dhaka
- Player of the match: Sunil Narine (Comilla Victorians)
- Umpires: Masudur Rahman; Prageeth Rambukwella

The 2022 Bangladesh Premier League Final was a day/night Twenty20 cricket match played between Fortune Barishal and Comilla Victorians on 18 February 2022 at the Sher-e-Bangla National Cricket Stadium, Dhaka to determine the winner of the 2021–22 Bangladesh Premier League, a professional Twenty20 cricket league in Bangladesh. Comilla Victorians won the final by 1 run to win their third BPL title.

== Route to final ==
=== League stage ===
	League matches									
Team	1	2	3	4	5	6	7	8	9	10
Comilla Victorians	2	4	6	6	8	9	9	11	13	13
Fortune Barishal	2	2	2	4	6	8	9	11	13	15

Won	Lost	No Result

Note: The points at the end of each group match are listed.
Note: Click on the points to see the summary for the match.

=== Playoffs ===
Semifinals
14 February 2022 — Dhaka
1	Fortune Barishal	143/8 (20 overs
2	Comilla Victorians	133/7 (20 overs)
14 February 2022 — Dhaka
3	Chattogram Challengers	189/5 (20 overs)
4	Khulna Tigers	182/5 (20 overs)

Preliminary final
16 February 2022 — Dhaka
2	Comilla Victorians	149/3 (12.5 overs)
3	Chattogram Challengers	148 (19.1 overs)

Final
18 February 2022 — Dhaka
1	Fortune Barishal	150/8 (20 overs)
2	Comilla Victorians	151/9 (20 overs)

=== Eliminator ===
14 February 2022
12:30
Scorecard

Chattogram Challengers; 189/5 (20 overs)	v	Khulna Tigers; 182/5 (20 overs)
Chadwick Walton 89* (44); Khaled Ahmed 2/40 (4 overs)		Andre Fletcher 80* (58); Mehidy Hasan 2/40 (4 overs)

Chattogram Challengers won by 7 runs
Sher-e-Bangla National Cricket Stadium, Dhaka
Umpires: Mahfuzur Rahman (Ban) and Prageeth Rambukwella (SL)
Player of the match: Chadwick Walton (Chattogram Challengers)

- Khulna Tigers won the toss and elected to field.

=== Qualifiers ===
Qualifier 1

14 February 2022
17:30 (N)
Scorecard

Fortune Barishal; 143/8 (20 overs)	v	Comilla Victorians; 133/7 (20 overs)
Munim Shahriar 44 (30); Shohidul Islam 3/25 (3 overs)		Liton Das 38 (35); Mehedi Hasan Rana 2/15 (3 overs)

Fortune Barishal won by 10 runs
Sher-e-Bangla National Cricket Stadium, Dhaka
Umpires: Tanvir Ahmed (Ban) and Masudur Rahman (Ban)
Player of the match: Mehedi Hasan Rana (Fortune Barishal)

- Comilla Victorians won the toss and elected to field.

Qualifier 2

16 February 2022
17:30 (N)
Scorecard

Chattogram Challengers; 148 (19.1 overs)	v	Comilla Victorians; 149/3 (12.5 overs)
Mehidy Hasan 44 (38); Moeen Ali 3/20 (3 overs)		Sunil Narine 57 (16); Benny Howell 1/11 (2 overs)

Comilla Victorians won by 7 wickets
Sher-e-Bangla National Cricket Stadium, Dhaka
Umpires: Tanvir Ahmed (Ban) and Prageeth Rambukwella (SL)
Player of the match: Sunil Narine (Comilla Victorians)

- Chattogram Challengers won the toss and elected to bat.
- Sunil Narine (Comilla Victorians) scored the fastest fifty in BPL (13 balls).

== Final ==
=== Match Officials ===
- On-field Umpires: (Bangladesh) Masudur Rahman and (Sri Lanka) Prageeth Rambukwella
- TV Umpire: (Bangladesh) Gazi Sohel
- Reserve Umpire: (Bangladesh) Tanvir Ahmed
- Match Referee: (Bangladesh) Raqibul Hasan

=== Background ===
Both the finalist team, Fortune Barishal and Comilla Victorians ended up in the top 2 of points table. Fortune Barishal winning 7 matches and losing 2 matches while 1 match being abandoned, ended as table topper. Comilla Victorians winning 6 matches, losing 3 matches and 1 match being abandoned ended in the 2nd position of the table.

In the Eliminator, Batting first, Chattogram Challengers scored 189 runs, courtesy of Chadwick Walton's unbeaten 89 runs But Khulna Tigers fell short of 7 runs despite a handy knock of unbeaten 80 runs from Andre Fletcher.

In the Qualifier 1, Fortune Barishal gathered an average score of 143, thanks to Munim Shahriar's 44 off 30 balls. Though a few of Victorians' batsman chipped in with some 20-odd scores, but no could capitalise those and eventually Victorians fell short of 10 runs in front of some disciplined bowling from Barishal's Shafiqul Islam and Mehedi Hasan Rana.

In the Qualifier 2 Mehidy Hasan's 44 and Akbar Ali's 33 helped Chattogram Challengers to post a target of 149 runs before being bowled out in 19.1 overs. In the run chase, though Liton Das got out on a duck on the very first ball of the innings, Sunil Narine, being promoted as an opener scored a 13-ball 50, which is the fastest fifty in the history of BPL. Victorians gathered 84 runs losing 2 wickets in the powerplay, most runs in powerplay in BPL, and eventually they went on to reach the target with ease losing just 3 wickets with 43 balls to spare.

=== Report ===
==== Comilla Victorians innings ====
Victorians Sunil Narine again opening the batting started of a flier despite losing his other partners Litton Das, Mahmudul Hasan Joy and Faf du Plessis cheaply. In the Powerplay they scored 73 runs, thanks to Narine's blistering knock of 23-ball 57. After Narine's wicket, Victorians lost wickets in a clutter, but a 53 runs partnership between Moeen Ali (38 off 32) and Abu Hider Rony (19 off 27) for the 7th wicket, helped them to post a respectable total of 151 runs in 20 overs. For Barishal, every bowler chipped in with wickets.

==== Fortune Barishal innings ====
Barishal lost their 1st wicket cheaply as Munim Shahriar got out on a duck, but Chris Gayle started off cautiously, while his partner Shaykat Ali scoring some quick runs, reached his fifty in 26 balls. Together they stitched a partnership of 74 off 51 balls for the 2nd wicket which helped the team to reach to 100 runs within 11.4 overs. With 52 runs to win in 49 balls with 8 wickets in hand, Barishal was on track to reach the target easily. But after the fall of Gayle, they lost the plot and kept on losing wickets at regular interval. Due to some economical bowling from Sunil Narine, Mustafizur Rahman and Tanvir Islam, Barishal were left to score 10 runs off the final over. But pacer Shohidul Islam successfully defended the score, helping his team to snatch a thrilling 1-run victory.

=== Summary ===
Comilla Victorians' bowling allrounder Sunil Narine received the Player of the Match award for his blistering knock of 57 off 23 balls and his impressive bowling, picking up 2 wickets for 15 runs in 4 overs.

Fortune Barishal's captain Shakib Al Hasan received the Player of the Tournament award for his all-round performances. He scored 284 runs at an average of 28.40 with three 50s and picked up 16 wickets at an average of 14.56.
