= 2018–19 Bangladesh Premier League final =

Championship match of the 2018 Bangladesh Premier League season

2018 Bangladesh Premier League Final
Comilla Victorians	Dhaka Dynamites
199/3	182/9
20 overs	20 overs
- Comilla Victorians won by 17 runs
- Date: 8 February 2019
- Venue: Sher-e-Bangla National Cricket Stadium, Dhaka
- Player of the match: Tamim Iqbal (Comilla Victorians)
- Umpires: Ranmore Martinesz; Alex Wharf
- Attendance: 24,000

The 2019 Bangladesh Premier League Final was a day/night Twenty20 cricket match played between Comilla Victorians and Dhaka Dynamites on 8 February 2019 at the Sher-e-Bangla National Cricket Stadium, Dhaka. Comilla Victorians defeated Dhaka Dynamites by 17 runs, to win the 2018–19 Bangladesh Premier League, a professional Twenty20 cricket league in Bangladesh.

== Route to final ==
=== League stage ===
League stage progression
Team	League matches											
Team	1	2	3	4	5	6	7	8	9	10	11	12
Comilla Victorians	2	2	4	4	6	8	8	10	12	14	16	16
Dhaka Dynamites	2	4	6	8	8	10	10	10	10	10	10	12

Won	Lost

Note: The points at the end of each group match are listed.
Note: Click on the points to see the summary for the match.

=== Play-offs ===
Semifinals
4 February 2019 — Sher-e-Bangla National Stadium, Dhaka
1	Rangpur Riders	165/5 (20 overs)
2	Comilla Victorians	166/2 (18.5 overs)
4 February 2019 — Sher-e-Bangla National Stadium, Dhaka
3	Chittagong Vikings	135/8 (20 overs)
4	Dhaka Dynamites	136/4 (16.4 overs)

Preliminary final
6 February 2019 — Sher-e-Bangla National Stadium, Dhaka
1	Rangpur Riders	142 (19.4 overs)
4	Dhaka Dynamites	147/5 (16.4 overs)

Final
8 February 2019 — Sher-e-Bangla National Stadium, Dhaka
2	Comilla Victorians	199/3 (20 overs)
4	Dhaka Dynamites	182/9 (20 overs)

=== Eliminator ===
4 February 2019
13:30
Scorecard

Chittagong Vikings; 135/8 (20 overs)	v	Dhaka Dynamites; 136/4 (16.4 overs)
Mosaddek Hossain Saikat 40 (35); Sunil Narine 4/15 (4 overs)		Upul Tharanga 51 (43); Khaled Ahmed 3/20 (4 overs)

Dhaka won by 6 wickets
Sher-e-Bangla National Cricket Stadium, Dhaka
Umpires: Ranmore Martinesz (SL) and Mahfuzur Rahman (Ban)
Player of the match: Sunil Narine (Dhaka Dynamites)

- Chittagong Vikings won the toss and elected to bat.

=== Qualifiers ===
Qualifier 1

4 February 2019
18:30 (D/N)
Scorecard

Rangpur Riders; 165/5 (20 overs)	v	Comilla Victorians; 166/2 (18.5 overs)
Benny Howell 53* (28); Sanjit Saha 1/14 (4 overs)		Evin Lewis 71* (53); Shafiul Islam 1/21 (3 overs)

Comilla won by 8 wickets
Sher-e-Bangla National Cricket Stadium, Dhaka
Umpires: Sharfuddoula (Ban) and Alex Wharf (Eng)
Player of the match: Evin Lewis (Comilla Victorians)

- Rangpur Riders won the toss and elected to bat.

Qualifier 2

6 February 2019
18:30 (D/N)
Scorecard

Rangpur Riders; 142 (19.4 overs)	v	Dhaka Dynamites; 147/5 (16.4 overs)
Ravi Bopara 49 (43); Rubel Hossain 4/23 (3.4 overs)		Andre Russell 40* (19); Mashrafe Mortaza 2/32 (4 overs)

Dhaka won by 5 wickets
Sher-e-Bangla National Cricket Stadium, Dhaka
Umpires: Masudur Rahman (Ban) and Alex Wharf (Eng)
Player of the match: Rubel Hossain (Dhaka Dynamites)

- Dhaka Dynamites won the toss and elected to field.

== Background ==
The match was played at the Sher-e-Bangla National Cricket Stadium. The top two teams, Rangpur Riders and Comilla Victorians faced each other in the Qualifier 1, with Comilla progressing directly to final after winning the match. Rangpur played the Qualifier 2 and the winner of the Eliminator, Dhaka Dynamites who has defeated Chittagong Vikings. Dhaka progressed to the final after defeating Rangpur.

== Final ==
Dhaka won the toss and decided to field. After dismissing Evin Lewis cheaply, Tamim Iqbal and Anamul Haque put on 89 runs in a partnership. Both Anamul and Shamshur Rahman were out in quick succession but Tamim and captain Imrul Kayes put on a 100-run partnership for the fourth wicket, with Tamim scoring his first BPL century.

In the chase, Dhaka lost the wicket of Sunil Narine to the second ball of the innings. Upul Tharanga and Rony Talukdar put on 102 runs for the second wicket, but after the pair were dismissed no other batters could establish effective partnerships and the team finished on 182 runs, losing the match by 17 runs. As a result, Comilla took their second BPL title.

Tamim Iqbal was chosen as Player of the Match for his match winning score of 141 not out. While Shakib Al Hasan was chosen Player of the Tournament for his all-round performance. Rilee Rossouw of Rangpur Riders was the highest run scorer in the tournament, while Shakib took the most wickets.
