= 2013 Bangladesh Premier League final =

2013 Bangladesh Premier League Final
- Event: 2013 Bangladesh Premier League
Dhaka Gladiators	Chittagong Kings
172/9	129
20 overs	16.5 overs
- Date: 19 February 2013
- Venue: Sher-e-Bangla National Cricket Stadium, Dhaka
- Player of the match: Mosharraf Hossain (Dhaka Gladiators)
- Umpires: Enamul Haque (BAN); Richard Illingworth (ENG)

The 2013 Bangladesh Premier League Final was a day/night Twenty20 cricket match played between the Dhaka Gladiators and the Chittagong Kings on 19 February 2013 at the Sher-e-Bangla National Cricket Stadium, Dhaka to determine the winner of the 2013 Bangladesh Premier League, second season of a professional Twenty20 cricket league in Bangladesh. It ended as the Gladiators defeated the Kings by 43 runs. It was the second consecutive final and title for the Gladiators.

The Gladiators, captained by Mashrafe Mortaza, topped the group stage table, whereas the Kings, led by Mahmudullah, stood at the third position.

The total attendance of the match was 25350 (Reference from BCB).Winning the toss, Kings' captain Mahmudullah opted to field first. The Gladiators scored 172 runs in 20 overs with a loss of 9 wickets. Batting at number 3, Wicket-keeper Anamul Haque top scored for the Gladiators with 58 runs. Shakib Al Hasan scored 41 for Gladiators. Kings' bowler Rubel Hossain took four wickets for 44 runs. The Kings failed to build a good opening partnership when their opener Shehan Jayasuriya got out at 26. After this there was no big partnerships expect the 37 runs partnership at 6th wicket which was their highest. However, the other opener Jason Roy and skipper Mahmudullah scored 40 and 44 respectively to get to the target. But lack of good partnerships and contributions the Kings' innings ended as 129 all-out. Gladiators won the match by 43 runs and earned the 2013 Bangladesh Premier League title. Mosharraf Hossain of Gladiators was named the man of the match for his three wickets for 26 runs in bowling.

== Route to the final ==
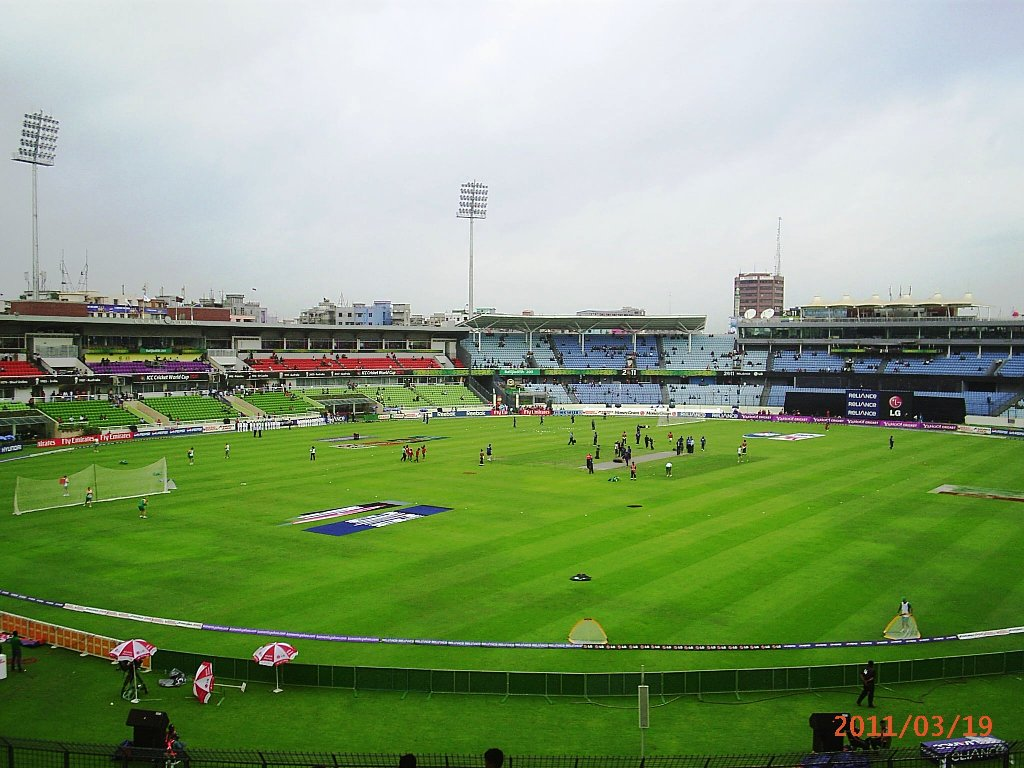
The venue of the final was Sher-e-Bangla National Cricket Stadium which also hosted the majority numbers of league stage match.

=== Group stage ===
The Gladiators started their campaign with three straight wins. However they lost to the Royals at their fourth match. Then they won two consecutive matches before they lost against the Kings. They again won three straight matches before the last match. Their loss to Barisal Burners wasn't too much effective as they went to beat the Kings at their last group stage match to top the points table of group stage. The campaign of Chittagong started with two straight defeats against Duronto and Rangpur Riders. They won just one match in their first five matches which came against the Burners while they lost to Royals and Burners in other matches. But from there they got four consecutive wins to get a position in the points table. Though in last three matches they only won against Duronto with losses against Riders and Gladiator. Still Kings qualified for the playoffs by securing the third place at the points table.

The two teams faced each other in two matches of the group stage, where both teams won a match each.

Group stage procession
Team	Group matches											
Team	1	2	3	4	5	6	7	8	9	10	11	12
Dhaka Gladiators	2	4	6	6	8	10	10	12	14	16	16	18
Chittagong Kings	0	2	2	2	2	4	6	8	10	10	12	12

Won	Lost

Note: The points at the end of each group match are listed.
Note: Click on the points to see the summary for the match.

=== Play-Off Stage ===
From 2013 edition of Bangladesh Premier League the knock-out stage format went through a change. The format was first and second place holder of the points table would play the first match of knockout stage called Race to the Final. While the third and fourth placed team at points table would play the second match of knockout stage called Elimination Final. Winner of Race to the Final would qualify for final and loser of Elimination Final would get eliminated from the tournament. Then the loser of the Race to the Final and winner of the Elimination Final would play the Semi-Final. Winner of Semi-Final would join the winner of Race to the Final in the Final of Bangladesh Premier League.

In the points table Dhaka Gladiators were the top placed team, then Sylhet Royals, Chittagong Kings and Duronto Rajshahi were in the second, third and fourth position respectively. So, Gladiators and Royals fought each other in the Race to the Final. In the match after winning the toss Royals captain Mushfiqur Rahim decided to field first. Royals bowlers bowled well as only two players of Gladiators could score more than 20 runs. But one of that innings were of 114 off 51 balls smashed by Chris Gayle. Gayle's 114 and 38 from Shakib Al Hasan helped Gladiators to reach 197 for 9 wickets in 20 overs. Sajedul Islam took three wickets for 23 runs in 4 overs. In reply Royals fought well with the skipper Rahim scoring 86 runs from 44 balls. But still they fell short of 4 runs and scored 193 for 6 in allotted 20 overs. Gladiators won the match by 4 runs and qualified for the final. While Royals had to play the Semi-Final.

Kings and Duronto who were the third and fourth placed team at points table respectively had to face each other in the Eliminator Final. Winning the toss Muktar Ali the skipper of Duronto Rajshahi opted to bat first. They could score 107 run with the loss of 6 wickets in their 20 overs. Sean Ervine scored unbeaten 47 runs. Kings bowler Taskin Ahmed took 4 wickets for 31 runs. In reply Kings reached the target easily with four wickets in hand and 16 balls to spare. Ravi Bopara scored unbeaten 34 runs for the Kings. As a result of this match Duronto were eliminated from the tournament while Kings qualified for the Semi-Final where their opponent was the Royals

The final qualifier of the knockout stage was contested by the Sylhet Royals and Chittagong Kings. Royals lost to Gladiators in the Race to the Final while Kings beat Duronto in the Eliminator Final to keep their hopes alive. The match was originally scheduled to play at 17 February 2016. But rain washed the game out and the game was decided to play on the next day which was also the rest day. Chittagong skipper Mahmudullah won the toss of the semifinal and asked Royals to bat first. Royals scored 149 for 7 wickets in 20 overs. Elton Chigumbura scored the highest score of unbeaten 42 while skipper Rahim scored 36. Their partnership of 58 in the fifth wicket helped Kings to post 149 on board. Enamul Haque jnr. and Kevon Cooper took two wickets each for Kings. Kings' start for the chase of 150 wasn't good as 2 wickets fallen just for 4 runs. But later on score of 44 and 33 from Ryan ten Doeschate and Nurul Hasan respectively helped Kings to chase down the target with three wickets in hand and five balls to spare. As a result of this match Royals were eliminated from the tournament and Kings joined Glaidiators in the Final.
