= 2012 Bangladesh Premier League squads =

The Bangladesh Premier League (BPL) is a professional Twenty20 cricketleague in Bangladesh. 2012 was the inaugural season of the tournament and was contested by six teams from different cities. This is a list of the squads for the 2012 edition.

== Dhaka Gladiators ==
This is the full squad of Dhaka Dynamites for the inaugural season.

Dhaka Gladiators squad
Batsmen: 17 Imran Nazir; 98 Mohammad Ashraful; -- Tanveer Haider; 05 Alexei Kervezee; 40 Nazimuddin; 97 Aftab Ahmed; 03 Darren Stevens; 05 Awais Zia; All-rounders: 10 Shahid Afridi; 55 Kieron Pollard; 14 Azhar Mahmood; 87 Mehrab Hossain Jnr	Wicket-keepers: 31 Anamul Haque; 69 Dhiman Ghosh; Bowlers: 02 Mashrafe Mortaza (Captain); 10 Saeed Ajmal; -- Stuart MacGill; 19 Elias Sunny; 34 Rana Naved-ul-Hasan; 70 Mosharraf Hossain; 90 Nazmul Hossain	Support staff: Head coach: Ian Pont; Consultant: Habibul Bashar; Bowling coach: Mohammad Rafique

== Khulna Royal Bengal ==
This is the full squad of Khulna Royal Bengals for the inaugural season.

Khulna Royal Bengals squad
Batsmen: 06 Shivnarine Chanderpaul; 74 Herschelle Gibbs; 13 Maisuqur Rahman; 09 Nazmul Hossain Milon; All-rounders: 75 Shakib Al Hasan; 69 Nasir Hossain; 07 Sanath Jayasuriya; 12 Andre Russell; 50 Dwayne Smith; 24 Marshall Ayub	Wicket-keepers: 11 Niall O'Brien; 77 Saghir Hossain; -- Jos Buttler; Bowlers: 41 Abdur Razzak; 33 Andre Adams; 10 Shahadat Hossain; 96 Shafiul Islam; 99 Dolar Mahmud; -- Fidel Edwards	Support staff: Manager: Zahid Razzak; Head coach: Robin Singh

== Chittagong Kings ==
Full squad of Chittagong Kings for the inaugural season.

Chittagong Kings squad
Batsmen: 29 Tamim Iqbal; 08 Jason Roy; 34 Nasir Jamshed; 09 Shamsur Rahman; 15 Kyle Coetzer; 19 Brendan Taylor; 37 Faisal Hossain; -- Lendl Simmons; All-rounders: -- Shoaib Malik; 70 Mahmudullah (Captain); 47 Dwayne Bravo; 20 Kevon Cooper; 23 Ziaur Rahman	Wicket-keepers: 71 Jahurul Islam; -- Umar Akmal; Bowlers: 10 Muttiah Muralitharan; -- Wahab Riaz; 12 Arafat Sunny; -- Jerome Taylor; 03 Farhad Reza; 02 Sanjamul Islam; 45 Enamul Haque Jr	Support staff: Head coach: Khaled Mahmud; Technical director: Dean Jones; Batting coach: Michael Bevan; Team consultant: Minhajul Abedin

== Barisal Burners ==
Full squad of Barisal Burners for the inaugural season.

Barisal Burners squad
Batsmen: 03 Shahriar Nafees (Captain); 07 Brad Hodge; 22 Mominul Haque; 66 Ahmed Shehzad; 77 Rameez Raja Jr.; All-rounders: 333 Chris Gayle; 17 Farhad Hossain; 27 Yasir Arafat; -- Sohag Gazi	Wicket-keepers: 10 Mithun Ali; 52 Phil Mustard; Bowlers: 00 Kabir Ali; 18 Alauddin Babu; 19 Al Amin; -- Hameed Hassan; 32 Nazmul Islam Apu; 46 Suhrawadi Shuvo; 99 Shane Harwood; -- Kamrul Islam Rabbi	Support staff: Head coach: Sarwar Imran; Consultant: Akram Khan

== Sylhet Royals ==
Full squad of Sylhet Royals for the inaugural season.

Sylhet Royals squad
Batsmen: 10 Alok Kapali; 25 Shuvagata Hom; 62 Imrul Kayes; -- Faisal Iqbal; 20 Tom Maynard; All-rounders: 07 Peter Trego (Captain); 11 Naeem Islam; 56 Scott Styris; -- Darren Sammy; -- Nadif Chowdhury; -- Arafat Salahuddin	Wicket-keepers: 15 Kamran Akmal; -- Frederik Klokker; Bowlers: 33 Sohail Tanvir; 34 Rubel Hossain; 00 Noor Hossain; 31 Brad Hogg; 37 Nabil Samad; 22 Talha Jubair; 23 Gary Keedy; 29 Abul Hasan	Support staff: Head coach: Stuart Law; Fielding coach: Jason Swift; Consultant: Naimur Rahman; Consultant: Rafiqul Alam

== Duronto Rajshahi ==
Full squad of Duronto Rajshahi for the inaugural season.

Duronto Rajshahi squad
Batsmen: 30 Junaid Siddique; 93 Shahzaib Hasan; 17 Mizanur Rahman; 00 Asif Ahmed; 14 Qaiser Abbas; 19 Khalid Latif; 11 Fawad Alam; 98 Rizwan Cheema; -- Ariful Haque; 12 Soumya Sarkar; All-rounders: 07 Sean Ervine; 09 Abdul Razzaq; 730 Marlon Samuels; 16 Sabbir Rahman	Wicket-keepers: 15 Mushfiqur Rahim (Captain); Bowlers: 27 Mohammad Sami; 10 Saqlain Sajib; 99 Syed Rasel; 23 Mukhtar Ali; -- Imran Tahir; 02 Taijul Islam; 22 Monir Hossain	valign="top" |Support staff: Head coach: Khaled Mashud; Assistant coach: Hannan Sarkar; Batting coach: Athar Ali Khan
