= 2019–20 Bangladesh Premier League final =

Championship match of the 2019 Bangladesh Premier League season

2019 Bangladesh Premier League Final
- Event: 2019–20 Bangladesh Premier League
Rajshahi Royals	Khulna Tigers
170/4	149/8
20 overs	20 overs
- Rajshahi Royals won by 21 runs
- Date: 17 January 2020
- Venue: Sher-e-Bangla National Cricket Stadium, Dhaka
- Player of the match: Andre Russell (Rajshahi Royals)
- Umpires: David Millns; Gazi Sohel
- Attendance: 27,725

The 2019–20 Bangladesh Premier League Final was a day/night Twenty20 cricket match played between Khulna Tigersand and Rajshahi Royals on 17 January 2020 at the Sher-e-Bangla National Cricket Stadium, Dhaka. Rajshahi won the match by 21 runs to win the 2019–20 Bangladesh Premier League, taking their first BPL title.

== Route to final ==
=== League stage ===
	League matches											
Team	1	2	3	4	5	6	7	8	9	10	11	12
Khulna Tigers	2	4	6	6	6	8	10	10	10	12	14	16
Rajshahi Royals	2	4	4	6	8	10	10	10	12	14	14	16

Won	Lost	No Result

Note: The points at the end of each group match are listed.
Note: Click on the points to see the summary for the match.

=== Playoffs ===
Semifinals
13 January 2020 — Dhaka
1	Khulna Tigers	158/3 (20 overs)
2	Rajshahi Royals	131 (20 overs)
13 January 2020 — Dhaka
3	Chattogram Challengers	147/3 (17.4 overs)
4	Dhaka Platoon	144/8 (20 overs)

Preliminary final
15 January 2020 — Dhaka
2	Rajshahi Royals	165/8 (19.2 overs)
3	Chattogram Challengers	164/9 (20 overs)

Final
17 January 2020 — Dhaka
1	Khulna Tigers	149/8 (20 overs)
2	Rajshahi Royals	170/4 (20 overs)

==== Eliminator ====
13 January 2020
13:20
Scorecard

Dhaka Platoon; 144/8 (20 overs)	v	Chattogram Challengers; 147/3 (17.4 overs)
Shadab Khan 64* (41); Rayad Emrit 3/23 (4 overs)		Chris Gayle 38 (49); Shadab Khan 2/32 (2.4 overs)

Chattogram Challengers won by 7 wickets
Sher-e-Bangla National Cricket Stadium, Dhaka
Umpires: David Millns (Eng) and Mahfuzur Rahman (Ban)
Player of the match: Rayad Emrit (Chattogram Challengers)

- Chattogram Challengers won the toss and elected to field.

==== Qualifiers ====
Qualifier 1

13 January 2020
18:30 (D/N)
Scorecard

Khulna Tigers; 158/3 (20 overs)	v	Rajshahi Royals; 131 (20 overs)
Nazmul Hossain Shanto 78* (57); Mohammad Irfan 2/13 (4 overs)		Shoaib Malik 80 (50); Mohammad Amir 6/17 (4 overs)

Khulna Tigers won by 27 runs
Sher-e-Bangla National Cricket Stadium, Dhaka
Umpires: Prageeth Rambukwella (SL) and Gazi Sohel (Ban)
Player of the match: Mohammad Amir (Khulna Tigers)

- Rajshahi Royals won the toss and elected to field.
- Mohammad Amir (Khulna Tigers) bowled the best bowling figures in the BPL (6/17).

Qualifier 2

15 January 2020
18:30 (D/N)
Scorecard

Chattogram Challengers; 164/9 (20 overs)	v	Rajshahi Royals; 165/8 (19.2 overs)
Chris Gayle 60 (24); Mohammad Nawaz 2/13 (4 overs)		Andre Russell 54* (22); Rubel Hossain 2/32 (4 overs)

Rajshahi Royals won by 2 wickets
Sher-e-Bangla National Cricket Stadium, Dhaka
Umpires: David Millns (Eng) and Mahfuzur Rahman (Ban)
Player of the match: Andre Russell (Rajshahi Royals)

- Rajshahi Royals won the toss and elected to field.

== Background ==
In the Eliminator, Chattogram Challengers defeated Dhaka Platoon by 7 wickets, and progresses to the Qualifier 2. In the Qualifier 1, top-ranked Khulna Tigers batting first could only manage 158 runs courtesy of Nazmul Hossain Shanto's 78 not out. In reply, Rajshahi Royals, lost five wickets in the powerplay and continued to lose wickets at regular intervals. Khulna sealed their spot in the final for the first time.

In the Qualifier 2, Chattogram Challengers, the winner of Eliminator scored 164 with the help of Chris Gayle's quickfire 60 from 24 balls. In reply, Rajshahi were again in trouble early, losing three wickets in the powerplay. After 15 overs they had scored only 89, leaving 76 runs needed from the final five overs. Andre Russell scored a quickfire 54 not out from 22 balls to reach their target.

== Final ==
Khulna won the toss and opted to field. Rajshahi opener Afif Hossain was out cheaply, but Liton Das and Irfan Sukkur put on a half-century partnership, with Irfan scoring 52 from 35 balls. Mohammad Nawaz's quickfire 41 from 20 balls and captain Andre Russell's 27 from 16 balls gave the Royals a total of 170 for the loss of four wickets.

In reply, Najmul Hossain Shanto was out from the second ball of the innings and both openers were dismissed cheaply. Shamsur Rahman and Rilee Rossouw rebuilt with a 74-run partnership for the third wicket, Shamsur scoring 52 from 43 balls. After Rossouw was out wickets began to fall and Khulna could score only 149, resulting in Rajshahi winning by 21 runs.

Andre Russell received the Player of the Match award for his all-round performance, scoring 27 runs from 16 balls and taking two wickets. Russell also received the Player of the Tournament after scoring 225 runs in 12 innings and taking 14 wickets.
