= Destiny Group =

Bangladeshi multilevel marketing company

- Trade name: DSE
- Company type: Public limited company
- Industry: Multilevel marketing pyramid scheme
- Headquarters: Dhaka, Bangladesh.
- Key people: Lt General (retd) M Harun-Ar-Rashid (Chairman); Rafiqul Amin (Managing Director)
- Website: www.destiny-2000ltd.com

Destiny group was a Bangladeshi multilevel marketing company that operated as a pyramid scheme.

== History ==
Destiny started out as a multilevel marketing company. It grew to own a newspaper and television channel. It advertised heavily and was one of the major sponsors of Bangladesh's 40th independence celebration. It sold 50 million trees in its plantation business that did not exist, with investors being shown pictures of trees in Sundarban forest. The trees were sold to 1.7 million investors but according to an anti-corruption commission only 5.3 percent of those trees existed. In 2014, Destiny distributors were trying to get a new license for their multilevel marketing activities.

== Investigations ==
Reports of irregularities in the company prompted the Anti-Corruption Commission and other government agencies to launch investigations of the company. The ACC investigation has found 722 bank accounts in a number of banks under the name of 37 companies of Destiny Group. Bangladesh Bank has reported that Destiny Group had laundered around 51.13 billion Bangladeshi taka ($748M as of 2006) from 2002 to 2006 through the accounts of its three sister concerns-Destiny 2000 Limited, Destiny Multipurpose Cooperative Society Limited, and Destiny Tree Plantation Limited. In May 2014, ACC filed money laundering cases against 51 executives of the company. The ACC has impounded 6.31 billion taka ($80.4M as of 2016) worth of assets of the company.
