= Khulna Tigers =

Bangladesh Premier League Franchise

- খুলনা টাইগার্স
- League: Bangladesh Premier League

Personnel
- Captain: Mehidy Hasan Miraz
- Coach: Talha Jubair
- Owner: MindTree Limited

Team information
- City: Khulna, Bangladesh
- Founded: 2012; 14 years ago (as Khulna Royal Bengals); 2016 (as Khulna Titans); 2019–now (as Khulna Tigers)
- Home ground: Khulna Divisional Stadium, Khulna

History
- Bangladesh Premier League wins: 0 (Runner-up 2019-20)
- Official website: www.khulnatigers.net
T20 kit

Khulna Tigers (Bengali: খুলনা টাইগার্স) is a franchise Twenty20 cricket team representing the Khulna Division in the Bangladesh Premier League (BPL), a Twenty20 cricket tournament. The franchise was owned by Gemcon Sports and was founded in 2016 as a replacement for the Khulna Royal Bengals who had participated in the first two seasons of the BPL. The Tigers use Sher-e-Bangla National Cricket Stadium, Sylhet International Cricket Stadium and Zohur Ahmed Chowdhury Stadium for home games.

During the 2016/17 season, the team was captained by Mahmudullah Riyad and was coached by Stuart Law.

For the 2017/18 Bangladesh Premier League season, Mahela Jayawardene was appointed as the head coach replacing Stuart Law who took up duties as the head coach of West Indies cricket team. On 16 November 2019, MindTree Limited and Premier Bank Limited was named as the sponsor of the team and the team was renamed to Khulna Tigers from Khulna Titans.

== History ==
The Khulna Royal Bengals team was originally formed by Orion Group and participated in the first two seasons of the Bangladesh Premier League in 2012 and 2013. Following the suspension of all of the BPL franchises following a range of financial and spot-fixing issues during the second season of the league, the original franchise was not re-established for the third season of the BPL in 2015.

== Season overview ==
=== 2012 ===
Khulna Royal Bengals forged a strong team with the likes of Shakib Al Hasan as captain and some other well known players such as Sanath Jayasuriya, Shivnarine Chanderpaul, Dwayne Smith and Herschelle Gibbs. In the league stage, the team was pretty outstanding, advancing to the playoffs finishing only second to Dhaka Gladiators. However, they lost a cliffhanger to Dhaka in the semi-finals, finishing off with a respectable outing

=== 2013 ===
After a strong last season, Khulna could not make a team as strong as their previous campaign. This time they have Shahriar Nafees as captain who had Riki Wessels, Shapoor Zadran and more as company. Khulna had a disastrous season this time. Losing 75% of their 12 matches, finishing last at 7th.

=== 2016 ===
After a complete change in the franchise ownership and management Khulna Titans were established in advance of the 2016–17 Bangladesh Premier League. They had a team with the likes of sume professional Bangladeshi players such as Mahmudullah (icon), Shafiul Islam, Ariful Haque, Mosharraf Hossain. They added 9 overseas to their roster such as Riki Wessels, Junaid Khan, Lendl Simmons, Nicholas Pooran and Andre Fletcher. They were defeated by both Rajshahi Kings and Dhaka Dynamites,ending up second in the team rankings with Junaid Khan as their leading wicket-taker and Mahmudullah as the leading scorer. They won nail-biting encounters against Chittagong Vikings and Rajshahi Kings in the league stage. They finished with being known as 'the team with the best bowling attack' as two of their seamers (Junaid and Shafiul) were in the top 10 most wickets list for the tournament and had a rather disappointing Batting lineup as most batter failed to show their potential other than Ariful and their icon.

=== 2017 ===
They re-signed Mahmudullah Riyad as their icon while they also made contracts with South African cricketers Rilee Rossouw, Kyle Abbott, Aussie star Chris Lynn (missed that BPL due to injury), Windies' 2016 ICC World T20 hero Carlos Brathwaite and his national teammate Chadwick Walton. They also signed Englishman Dawid Malan and Lankan all-rounder Seekkuge Prasanna and more. They retained Junaid Khan, Ariful Haque, Shafiul Islam, Mosharraf Hossain Rubel and Benny Howell. Pakistani Wicket-keeper batsman Sarfraz Ahmed, leg spinner Shadab Khan and Junaid will be unavailable for selection on a temporary basis due to domestic commitments.

From the draft, the Titans signed 8 locals (more than minimum of 7) and 2 foreigners. Their first pick was bought Nazmul Hossain Shanto while the surprise picks were U19 skipper Saif Hassan and little-known local pacer Imran Ali and Barbados-born English cricketer Jofra Archer. The interesting thing about Imran is that he took a 5-wicket haul in his second List-A match. They signed Sri Lankan batting all-rounder Shehan Jayasuriya and other locals from the draft.

Khulna Titans had the strong start with a win against Sylhet Sixers. The team was pretty consistent throughout the tournament and finished 3rd in the league stage, hence qualifying to the playoffs. In the eliminator against Rangpur Riders a one-man show from Chris Gayle, who struck an unbeaten 126, blew the Titans away and had them eliminated.

=== 2019 ===
Khulna Titans retained Mahmudullah Riyad, Nazmul Hossain Shanto, Ariful Haque and Carlos Brathwaite. They also signed English batsman Dawid Malan and American fast bowler Ali Khan pre-draft.

In the draft, the Titans got the very first pick and signed wicket-keeper batsman Jahurul Islam. Their overseas signings in the draft included veteran seamer Lasith Malinga, leg-spinner Yasir Shah, wicket-keeper batsman Brendan Taylor and more. Some of their domestic picks were Junaid Siddiqui, Subashis Roy, Taijul Islam, the young left-arm seamer Shoriful Islam and more.

=== 2019/20 ===
The franchise had signed former Australian captain and all-rounder Shane Watson and South African leg spinner Imran Tahir as their two direct overseas signings.

However, during the player's direct signing period, a conflict of interest arose between BCB and all other franchises. Subsequently, in September 2019, BCB made some changes in the rules and regulations for the season. Eliminating all franchises, BCB took over charge of the current BPL and decided to run the tournament by the itself, renaming the tournament as the Bangabandhu BPL T20 2019 in order to pay homage to Sheikh Mujibur Rahman on his birth centenary. Premier Bank Limited became the team sponsor of Khulna and the team was renamed to Khulna Tigers. They signed the likes of Mushfiqur Rahim and Mohammad Amir in the draft.

They had a better season in 2019-20 BPL and finished the league stage being the table topper,reaching the final. But the Andre Russell show for Rajshahi Royals shuttered their dream of winning the BPL title.

=== 2022 ===
This year they retained Mushfiqur Rahim as their captain. They also took in local players, like - Soumya Sarkar, Mahedi Hasan etc. & foreign players, like - Thisara Perera, Andre Fletcher etc.

They won 50% of their games in league stage and finished 4th at the points table. However, they lost to Chattogram Challengers in the eliminator.

=== 2023 ===
In 2023 season, they signed the biggest name Tamim Iqbal. The West Indian Shai Hope captained Khulna Tigers in this season. Fakhar Zaman, Wahab Riaz, Avishka Fernando were other big names. Khulna Tigers won only 3 of their 12 league stage games and finished the season at number 5.

=== 2024 season ===
International players were Alex Hales, Wayne Parnell, Dasun Shanaka, Evin Lewis, Shai Hope and Mohammad Nawaz and so on . Anamul Haque captained Khulna Tigers in this season.

The Khulna Tigers opened their campaign strongly winning all the first 4 games. But they could manage to win only a single match of their next 8 games. As a result, they got eliminated being the 5th team in the league stage points table.

=== 2025 season ===
Khulna Tigers were able to become the second runners up of this edition. The squad consisted of notable local stars such as Captain Mehidy Hasan Miraz, Hasan Mahmud and Naim Sheikh. Foreign signings include Alex Ross, Mohammad Nawaz, Shimron Hetmyer, Jason Holder, Will Bosisto, Ibrahim Zadran, Mohammad Hasnain as well as Lewis Gregory.

== Squad ==
Name	Nationality	Batting style	Bowling style	Notes
Batters
Imrul Kayes	Bangladesh	Left-handed	Slow left-arm orthodox	
Shimron Hetmyer	West Indies	Left-handed		Overseas player
Naim Sheikh	Bangladesh	Left-handed	–	
Alex Ross	Australia	Right-handed	Right-arm off break	Overseas player
Mahmudul Hasan Joy	Bangladesh	Right-handed	Right-arm off break	
Ibrahim Zadran	Afghanistan	Right-handed		Overseas player
Dom Sibley	England	Right-handed	Right-arm leg break	Overseas player
Darwish Rasooli	Afghanistan	Right-handed	Right-arm off break	Overseas player
Wicket-keepers
Mahidul Islam Ankon	Bangladesh	Right-handed	–	
All-rounders
Mehedi Hasan Miraz	Bangladesh	Right-handed	Right-arm off break	Captain
Jason Holder	West Indies	Right-handed	Right-arm fast medium	Overseas player
Afif Hossain	Bangladesh	Left-handed	Right-arm off break	
Aamir Jamal	Pakistan	Right-handed	Right-arm fast medium	Overseas player
Mahfuzur Rahman Rabby	Bangladesh	Left-handed	Slow left-arm orthodox	
Will Bosisto	Australia	Right-handed	Right-arm off break	Overseas player
Mohammad Nawaz	Pakistan	Left-handed	Slow left-arm orthodox	Overseas player
Lewis Gregory	England	Right-handed	Right-arm fast medium	Overseas player
Pace bowlers
Hasan Mahmud	Bangladesh	Right-handed	Right-arm fast medium	
Rubel Hossain	Bangladesh	Right-handed	Right-arm fast	
Abu Hider Rony	Bangladesh	Right-handed	Left-arm fast medium	
Musfik Hasan	Bangladesh	Right-handed	Right-arm Medium	
Ziaur Rahman	Bangladesh	Right-handed	Right-arm fast medium	
~~Mohammad Hasnain~~	Pakistan	Right-handed	Right-arm fast medium	Overseas player
Oshane Thomas	West Indies	Left-handed	Right-arm fast medium	Overseas player
Salman Irshad	Pakistan	Right-handed	Right-arm fast medium	Overseas player
Spin bowlers
Nasum Ahmed	Bangladesh	Left-handed	Slow left-arm orthodox	

== Seasons ==
=== Bangladesh Premier League ===
Year	League standing	Final standing
2012	2nd out of 6	Semi-finals
2013	7th out of 7	League stage
2015	Did not participate	
2016	2nd out of 7	Playoffs
2017	3rd out of 7	Playoffs
2019	7th out of 7	League stage
2019–20	1st out of 7	Runners-up
2022	4th out of 6	Playoffs
2023	5th out of 7	League stage
2024	5th out of 7	League stage
2025	4th out of 7	Playoffs
