= Sher-e-Bangla National Cricket Stadium =

Cricket ground

- Mirpur Cricket Stadium
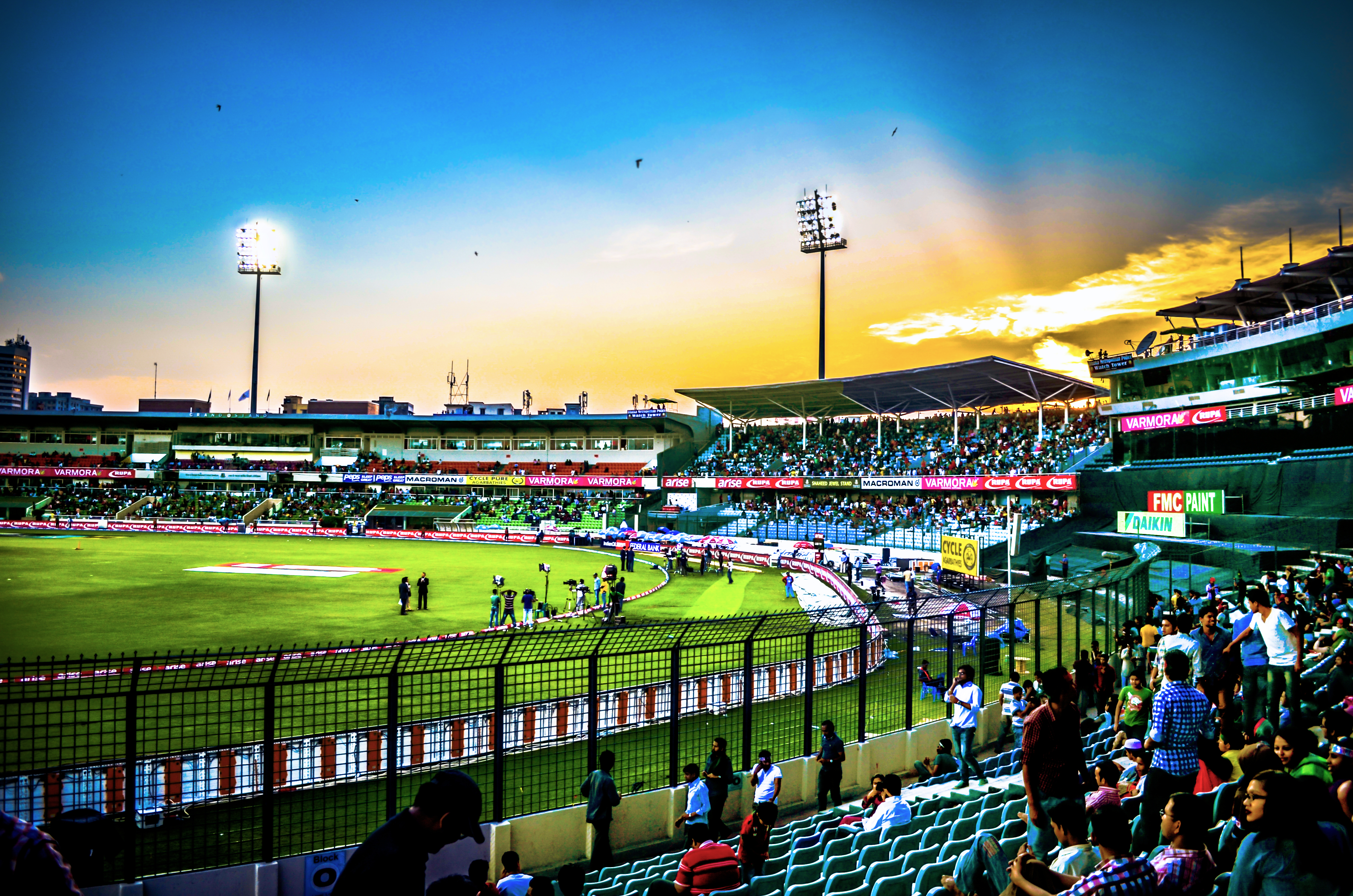
- Interactive map of Sher-e-Bangla National Cricket Stadium

Ground information
- Location: Mirpur, Dhaka, Bangladesh
- Country: Bangladesh
- Coordinates: 23°48′24.9″N 90°21′48.9″E
- Capacity: 25,416
- Owner: National Sports Council
- Operator: Bangladesh Cricket Board
- Tenants: Bangladesh cricket team, Dhaka Capitals
- End names
- TVS Apache RTR End; Runner End

International information
- First men's Test: 25–27 May 2007: Bangladesh v India
- Last men's Test: 08-12 May 2026: Bangladesh v Pakistan
- First men's ODI: 8 December 2006: Bangladesh v Zimbabwe
- Last men's ODI: 14 June 2026: Bangladesh v Australia
- First men's T20I: 11 October 2011: Bangladesh v West Indies
- Last men's T20I: 2 May 2026: Bangladesh v New Zealand
- First women's ODI: 17 February 2009: Pakistan v Sri Lanka
- Last women's ODI: 02 December 2024: Bangladesh v Ireland
- First women's T20I: 11 September 2012: Bangladesh v South Africa
- Last women's T20I: 4 April 2024: Bangladesh v Australia
- As of 29 July 2026; Source: Cricinfo

The Sher-e-Bangla National Cricket Stadium (SBNCS; Bengali: শের-ই-বাংলা জাতীয় ক্রিকেট স্টেডিয়াম), also called Mirpur Stadium, is an International cricket ground at Mirpur, Dhaka, the capital of Bangladesh. Located 10 kilometres from the city centre, the ground holds approximately 25,000 people and is named after the Bengali statesman A. K. Fazlul Huq, who was accorded the title Sher-e-Bangla ("Tiger of Bengal").

== History ==
The ground was originally constructed for football in late 1988 and first hosted matches at the 1988–89 Asian Club Championship. The venue was taken over by the Bangladesh Cricket Board in 2004, replacing the Bangabandhu National Stadium as the home of both the men's and women's national teams. The stadium has field dimensions of 186 m × 136 m.

The first international cricket match at the redeveloped ground was held in December 2006, and the stadium has since hosted matches of the 2011 World Cup, 2012 and 2014 Asia Cup, 2016 Asia Cup along with the majority of Bangladesh Premier League (BPL) matches. The finals of the 2014 ICC World Twenty20 and Women's World Twenty20 were hosted at the stadium. The stadium hosted its first International T20 on 11 October 2011, Bangladesh vs West Indies.

On 17 January 2018, during the 2017–18 Bangladesh Tri-Nation Series, it became the sixth and fastest venue to host 100 ODIs.

For the 2019–20 Bangabandhu BPL Final, 27,725 people gathered at this venue, the highest crowd attendance and beyond its official capacity.

On 3 March 2023, during the 2nd ODI between Bangladesh and England, the venue hosted its 200th men's international match, which was also the 100th ODI match played by Bangladesh men's cricket team at this venue.

During the one-off test between Bangladesh and Afghanistan from 14–18 June 2023, when Bangladesh's Najmul Hossain Shanto scored a century in their first innings, it was the 100th century at this venue combining all three international format.

== Facilities ==
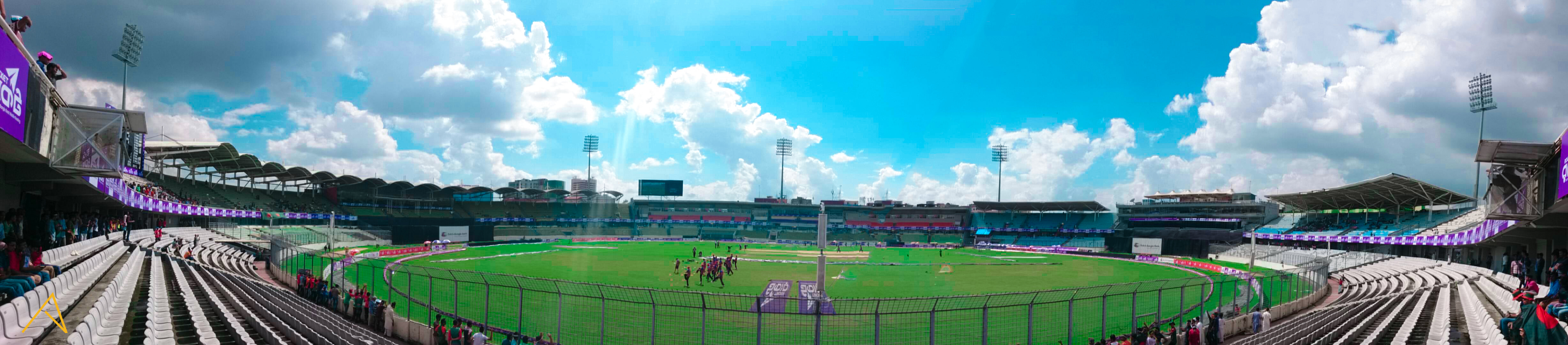
Sher-e-Bangla National Stadium Panorama

The ground was originally built for football and athletics, and was hence rectangular in shape. To restore it to a shape suitable for cricket, a lot of renovation had to be done, and the athletics tracks had to be dug up. About three feet of soil was excavated to remove the red clay. PVC pipes were fitted before re-filling with rock chips and sand, and then grass. The slope is even, a difference of 29 inches from the wicket to the boundary. The ground was fitted with floodlights in 2009 and is able to host day/night cricket matches.

== First Test, ODI and T20I ==
The ground hosted its first Test match on 25 May 2007, when the home team played India. The first ODI took place on 8 December 2006, when Bangladesh played Zimbabwe. On 11 October 2011, the stadium hosted its first T20I, between Bangladesh and West Indies.

== Stats and records ==
=== Stats ===
Ground Figures
Format	P	H	T	N	D/N/T	Inaugural Match	Latest Match	Refs
Test	26	8	15	0	3	25 May 2007	14 June 2023	
ODIs	117	50	50	17	1	8 December 2006	3 March 2023	
T20Is	61	21	22	18	0	11 October 2011	14 March 2023	
Last updated: Bangladesh v Afghanistan 18 June 2023

- It also hosted 6 matches of ICC Cricket World Cup 2011 while home team played 4 group stage matches against other opponents and 1 was Quarter final between Pakistan and West Indies
- The Stadium hosted all Pool A matches of 2014 ICC World Twenty20 and also Knock out stage matches together with the opening match.
- The venue has hosted all matches of 2012 Asia Cup and Asia Cup 2016, first ever Asia Cup in T20 format, including 2 qualifier matches.

=== Records ===
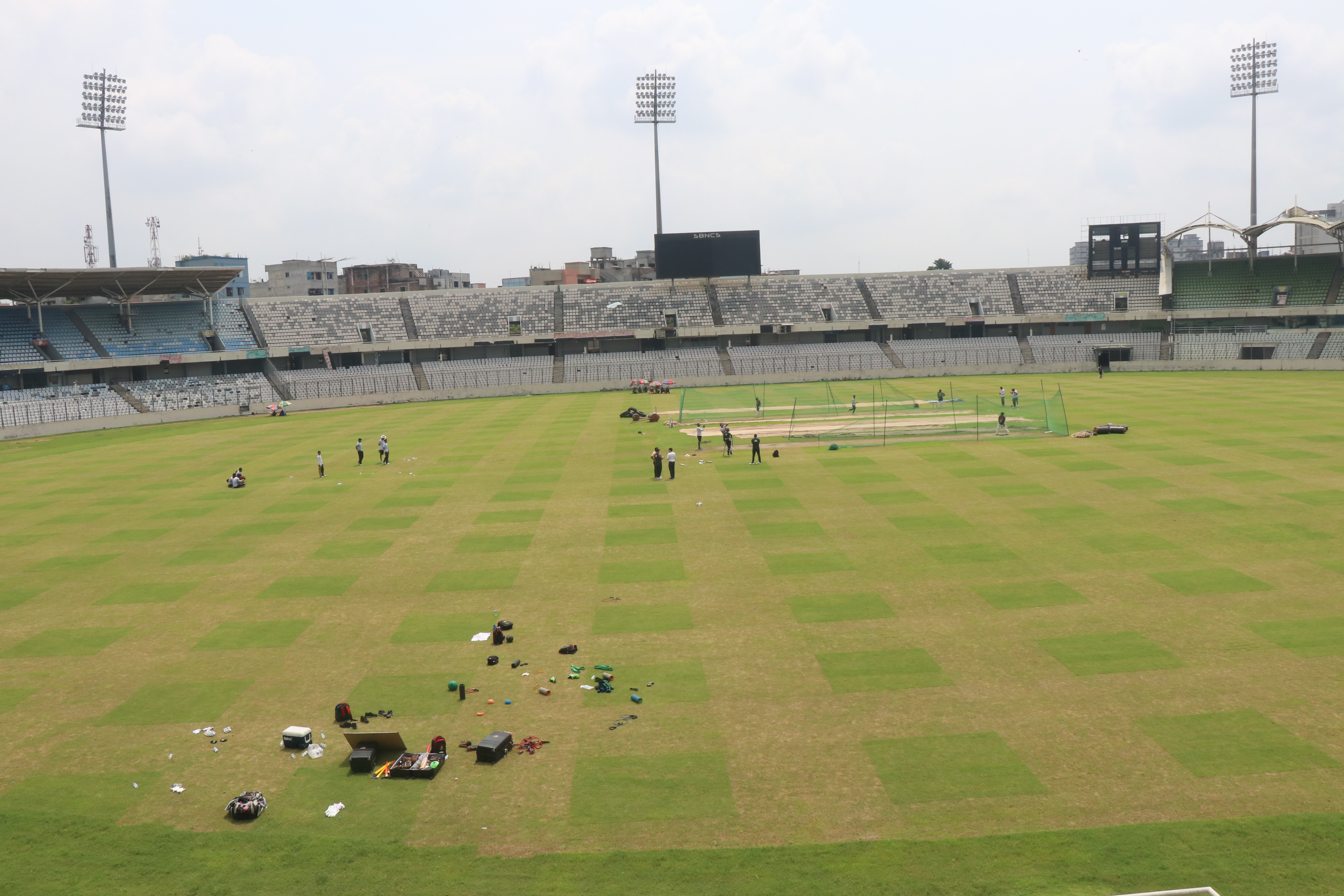
Sher-e-Bangla National Cricket Stadium practice session ground

- Tamim Iqbal is joint 2nd in the list for scoring the most ODI centuries at any single ground scoring 5 centuries at this venue.
- On 17 June 2014, in the 2nd ODI between Bangladesh and India, Taskin Ahmed became the first Bangladeshi Bowler to take 5 wicket on an ODI Debut, and became the youngest (19 yrs) player to do so.
- On 17 June 2014, in the 2nd ODI between Bangladesh and India, Stuart Binny picked up 6 wickets for 4 runs which is the best bowling figures by an Indian in ODI history.
- On 1 December 2014 against Zimbabwe Taijul Islam became the first cricketer to take a Hat-Trick on ODI Debut.
- On 17 April 2015 in the first ODI between Bangladesh and Pakistan, Bangladesh made their highest ODI total (329–6) against any team, surpassing 326–3 against same opponent.
- On 18 June 2015 in the first ODI between Bangladesh and India, Bangladesh for the first time scored 300 or more runs in an ODI against India and won the match by 79 runs while accurately 1 yr 1 day later of Taskin Ahmed's feat, Mustafizur Rahman become only 2nd Bangladeshi bowler to take 5 wicket on Debut. Incidentally both the bowlers got this feat against India at this venue.
- On 21 July 2015 in the 2nd ODI between Bangladesh and India, Mustafizur Rahman became only 2nd bowler to have taken 5-fer in the first two matches after Brian Vitori. In fact, he became only bowler to take 11 wicket in first two ODIs. Winning this match, Bangladesh for the first time won a series against India. In the 3rd ODI he took 2 wickets and become the only bowler to have taken 13 wickets in first 3 matches and also become the highest wicket taker in 3 match ODI series.
- On 10 July 2015 in the first ODI between Bangladesh and South Africa, Kagiso Rabada made his ODI debut and took a Hat-trick, becoming the only 2nd Bowler to do so and also made the Best Bowling figure(6/16) in ODI on Debut.
- On 12 July 2015 in the 2nd ODI between Bangladesh and South Africa, South Africa were bowled out for a mere 162 runs. This was their lowest total against Bangladesh and the first time they were bowled out for less than 200 in the 1st innings since 2009. Nasir Hossain made his best bowling figure (3/26). Bangladesh chased it down with 22.2 overs to spare, which is 2nd biggest defeat in terms of balls for South Africa in the Sub-continent.
- On 23 January 2018 against Zimbabwe, Tamim Iqbal became the first batsman for Bangladesh to reach 6,000 runs in ODIs and went past Sanath Jayasuriya's 2,514 runs at the R. Premadasa Stadium to become highest run-scorer at a single venue in ODIs.
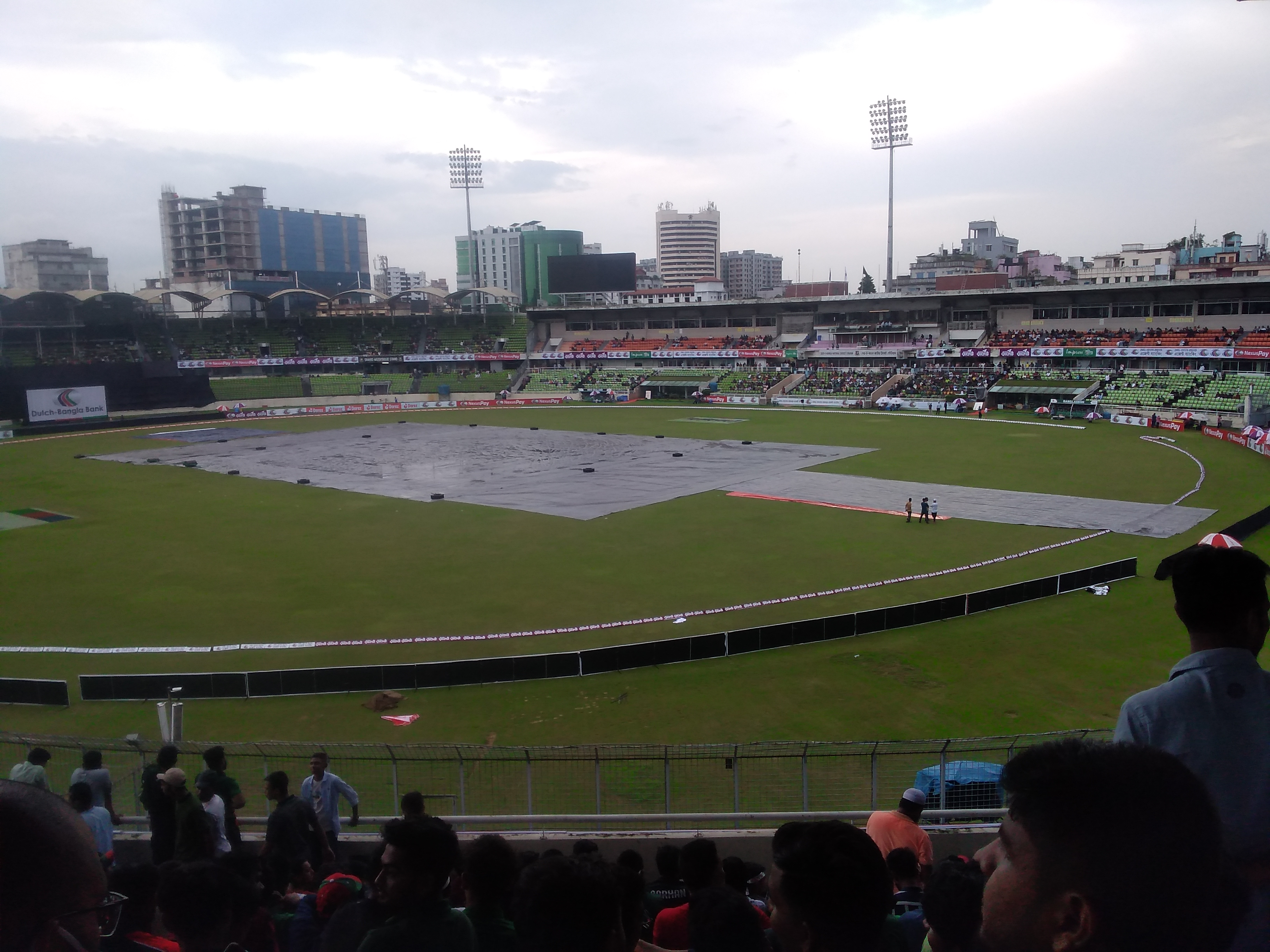
- The play came to a halt when the pitch was covered as it was raining during Bangladesh vs New Zealand, first ODI, New Zealand tour of Bangladesh, 2023.
  On 3 November 2018 against Zimbabwe, Mushfiqur Rahim become first ever wicket-keeper—batsman to score two double centuries in test cricket history.
- In the 3rd ODI between Bangladesh and Sri Lanka in 2021, Kusal Perera of Sri Lanka scored 120 runs, which was the 50th One Day International century at this venue, the 4th most number of ODI centuries at any ground.
- On 3 March 2023, during the 2nd ODI between Bangladesh and England, Mushfiqur Rahim became the only cricketer to play 150 matches at a single venue.
- During the one-off test between Bangladesh and Afghanistan from 14–18 June 2023, Bangladesh registered their biggest margin of victory in terms of runs and overall third biggest win, in terms of runs and the biggest win in the 21st century, in Tests. Besides, Najmul Hossain Shanto became the second batter for Bangladesh to score centuries in both innings of a Test.

== BPL ==
Till 2019-20 BPL, the venue has hosted most of the matches (198) including all Playoff matches and Finals.

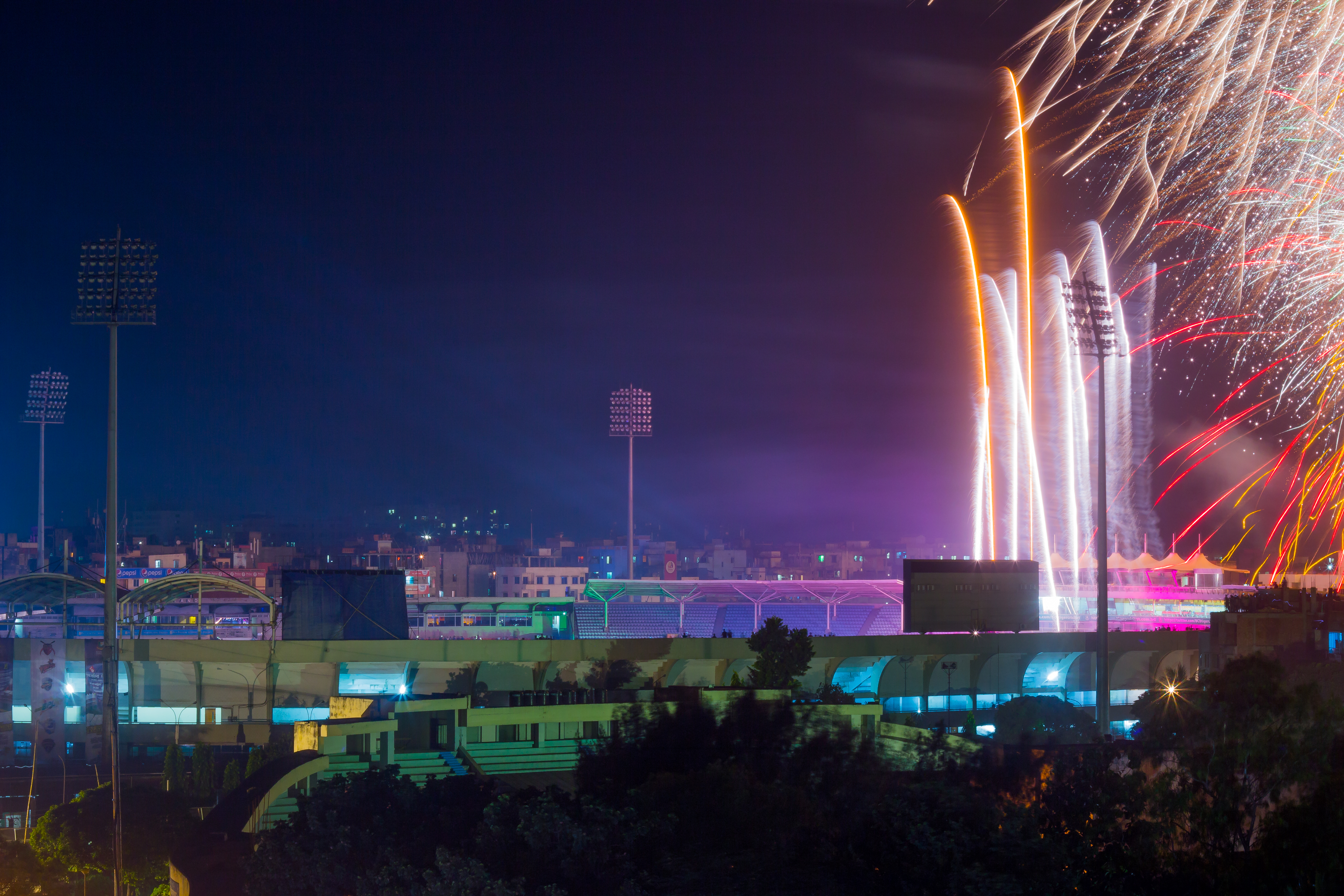
BPL, Opening Ceremony 2015, Sher-e-Bangla National Cricket Stadium

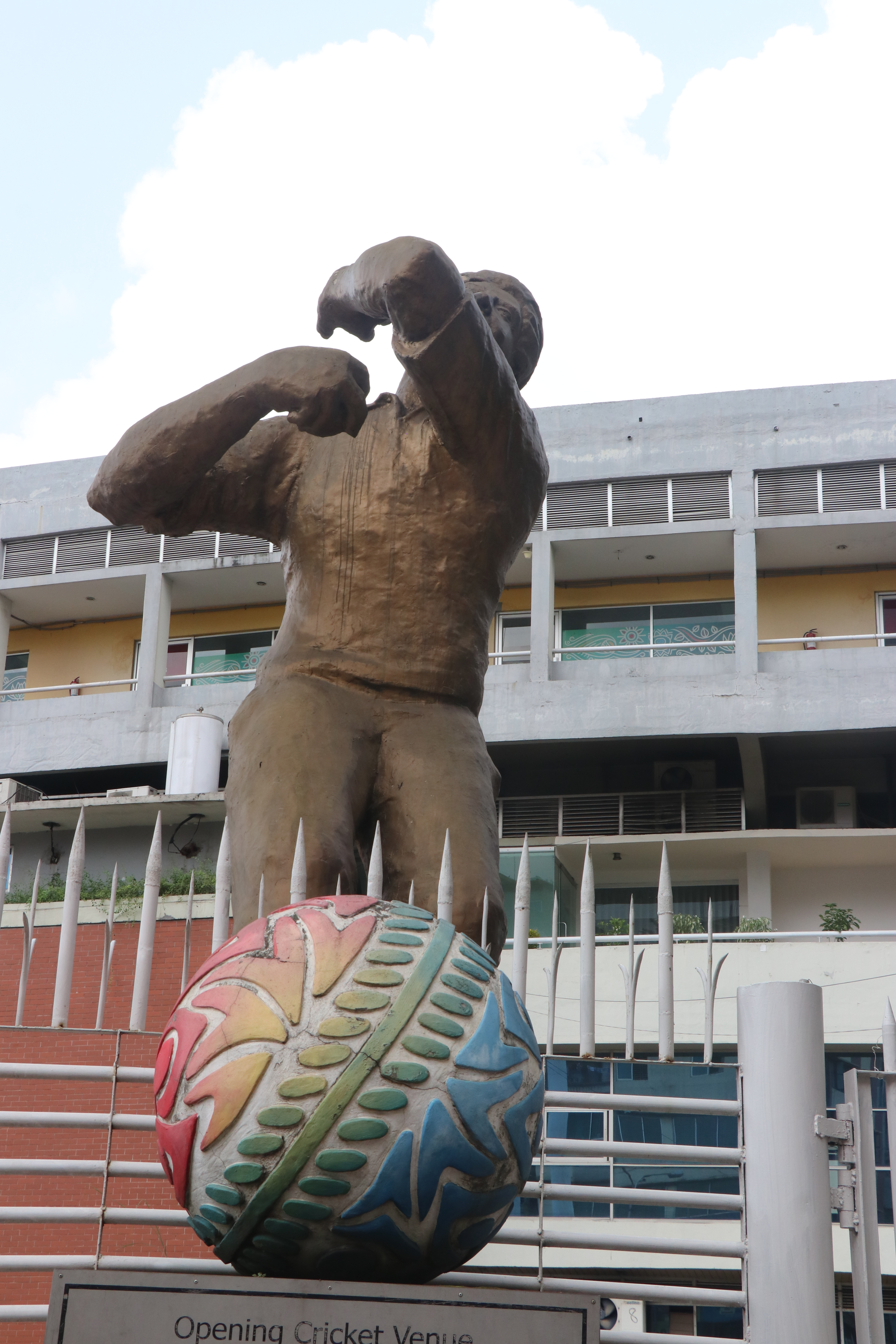
Cricketer monuments in front of Sher-e-Bangla Cricket Stadium by Bangladesh Cricket Board (BCB)

== 2011 World Cup ==
The stadium hosted 4 Group matches and 2 Quarter Finals during the 2011 Cricket World Cup which took place in 19 February – 2 April, jointly hosted by Bangladesh, Sri Lanka and India. The other venue in Bangladesh was Chittagong.

=== Renovations ===
Prior to the tournament, the stadium has undergone radical renovations. A giant screen and an electronic scoreboard had been installed, the traditional sight-screens have been replaced with electronic ones, the floodlights have been improved, a hover cover has been bought from the UK for about $16,000, plastic seats have been installed for the whole ground, a new media center has been built which accommodates about 200 journalists and the dressing rooms have also been given a makeover. Also adjacent to the main ground, a new Cricket Academy has been formed and with it came a whole new training ground, adding to the already existing indoor training facility.

=== Group matches ===
19 February 2011
14:30 (D/N)
Scorecard

India; 370/4 (50 overs)	v	Bangladesh; 283/9 (50 overs)
Virender Sehwag 175 (140); Shakib Al Hasan 1/61 (10 overs)		Tamim Iqbal 70 (86); Munaf Patel 4/48 (10 overs)

India won by 87 runs
Sher-e-Bangla National Stadium, Dhaka
Umpires: Steve Davis (Aus) and Kumar Dharmasena (SL)
Player of the match: Virender Sehwag (Ind)

- Bangladesh the toss and elected to field.

25 February 2011
14:30 (D/N)
Scorecard

Bangladesh; 205 (49.2 overs)	v	Ireland; 178 (45 overs)
Tamim Iqbal 44 (43); Andre Botha 3/32 (9 overs)		Niall O'Brien 38 (52); Shafiul Islam 4/21 (8 overs)

Bangladesh won by 27 runs
Sher-e-Bangla National Stadium, Dhaka
Umpires: Aleem Dar (Pak) and Rod Tucker (Aus)
Player of the match: Tamim Iqbal (Ban)

- Bangladesh won the toss and elected to bat.

4 March 2011
14:30 (D/N)
Scorecard

Bangladesh; 58 (18.5 overs)	v	West Indies; 59/1 (12.2 overs)
Junaid Siddique 25 (27); Sulieman Benn 4/18 (5.5 overs)		Chris Gayle 37* (36); Naeem Islam 1/14 (6 overs)

West Indies won by 9 wickets
Sher-e-Bangla National Stadium, Dhaka
Umpires: Steve Davis (Aus) and Kumar Dharmasena (SL)
Player of the match: Kemar Roach (WI)

- Bangladesh won the toss and elected to bat.

19 March 2011
09:30
Scorecard

South Africa; 284/8 (50 overs)	v	Bangladesh; 78 (28 overs)
Jacques Kallis 69 (76); Rubel Hossain 3/56 (8 overs)		Shakib Al Hasan 30 (49); Robin Peterson 4/12 (7 overs)

South Africa won by 206 runs
Sher-e-Bangla National Stadium, Dhaka
Umpires: Aleem Dar (Pak) and Daryl Harper (Aus)
Player of the match: Lonwabo Tsotsobe (SA)

=== Quarter-finals ===
23 March 2011
14:30 (D/N)
Scorecard

West Indies; 112 (43.3 overs)	v	Pakistan; 113/0 (20.5 overs)
Shivnarine Chanderpaul 44* (106); Shahid Afridi 4/30 (9.3 overs)		Mohammad Hafeez 61* (64)

Pakistan won by 10 wickets
Sher-e-Bangla National Stadium, Dhaka
Umpires: Billy Bowden (NZ) and Steve Davis (Aus)
Player of the match: Mohammad Hafeez (Pak)

- West Indies won the toss and elected to bat.

25 March 2011
14:30 (D/N)
Scorecard

New Zealand; 221/8 (50 overs)	v	South Africa; 172 (43.2 overs)
Jesse Ryder 83 (121); Morné Morkel 3/46 (8 overs)		Jacques Kallis 47 (75); Jacob Oram 4/39 (9 overs)

New Zealand won by 49 runs
Sher-e-Bangla National Stadium, Dhaka
Umpires: Aleem Dar (Pak) and Rod Tucker (Aus)
Player of the match: Jacob Oram (NZ)

- New Zealand won the toss and elected to bat.

== See also ==
- List of stadiums in Asia
- List of international cricket grounds in Bangladesh
- Stadiums in Bangladesh
