= Pakistani cricket team in Bangladesh in 2014–15 =

International cricket tour

Pakistan cricket team in Bangladesh in 2014–15
	Bangladesh	Pakistan
- Dates: 17 April 2015 – 10 May 2015
Captains	Mushfiqur Rahim (Tests); Shakib Al Hasan (1st ODI); Mashrafe Mortaza (2nd & 3rd ODIs & T20I)	Misbah-ul-Haq (Tests); Azhar Ali (ODIs); Shahid Afridi (T20I)

Test series
- Result: Pakistan won the 2-match series 1–0
Most runs	Tamim Iqbal (277)	Azhar Ali (334)
Most wickets	Taijul Islam (10)	Yasir Shah (10)
- Player of the series: Azhar Ali (Pak)

One Day International series
- Results: Bangladesh won the 3-match series 3–0
Most runs	Tamim Iqbal (312)	Azhar Ali (209)
Most wickets	Arafat Sunny (6)	Wahab Riaz (7)
- Player of the series: Tamim Iqbal (Ban)

Twenty20 International series
- Results: Bangladesh won the 1-match series 1–0
Most runs	Shakib Al Hasan (57)	Mukhtar Ahmed (37)
Most wickets	Mustafizur Rahman (2)	Umar Gul (1); Wahab Riaz (1)
- Player of the series: Sabbir Rahman (Ban)

The Pakistan cricket team toured Bangladesh from 15 April to 10 May 2015. The tour consisted of a 50-over tour match between Pakistan and a Bangladesh Cricket Board XI, two Test matches, three One Day Internationals and one Twenty20 International.

Bangladesh won the ODI series 3–0, its first ever series win against Pakistan, and also won the sole Twenty20 International played. Pakistan won the Test series 1–0.

== Squads ==
Sohaib Maqsood withdrew from the tour due to a hand injury on 7 April; he was replaced by the uncapped Saad Nasim. Sohail Khan withdrew due to a back injury on 11 April; he was replaced in the ODI squad by Junaid Khan, who was already part of the T20I and Test squads. His replacement in the Test squad was Imran Khan. Yasir Shah withdrew from the tour due to a hand injury on 16 April; he was replaced in the ODI squad by Zulfiqar Babar. Ehsan Adil withdrew from the ODI squad on 18 April and was replaced by Umar Gul. Bangladesh announced their T20I squad on 22 April, which included the uncapped Litton Das and Mustafizur Rahman. Bangladesh announced their squad for the Test series on 24 April. Pakistan's Rahat Ali was ruled out of the Test series due to a hamstring injury. Bangladesh fast bowler Rubel Hossain was ruled out of the second Test with a side strain and was replaced by Abul Hasan.

Tests		ODIs		T20Is	
Bangladesh	Pakistan	Bangladesh	Pakistan	Bangladesh	Pakistan
Mushfiqur Rahim (c) (wk); Tamim Iqbal (vc); Litton Das; Mominul Haque; Abul Hasan; Shakib Al Hasan; Shuvagata Hom; Jubair Hossain; Rubel Hossain (withdrawn); Shahadat Hossain; Taijul Islam; Imrul Kayes; Mahmudullah Riyad; Soumya Sarkar; Mohammad Shahid	Misbah-ul-Haq (c); Sarfaraz Ahmed (wk); Saeed Ajmal; Azhar Ali; Rahat Ali (withdrawn); Sami Aslam; Babar Azam; Zulfiqar Babar; Mohammad Hafeez; Junaid Khan; Sohail Khan (withdrawn); Younis Khan; Wahab Riaz; Yasir Shah; Asad Shafiq; Haris Sohail; Imran Khan	Mashrafe Mortaza (c); Shakib Al Hasan (vc); Taskin Ahmed; Mominul Haque; Abul Hasan; Nasir Hossain; Rubel Hossain; Tamim Iqbal; Mushfiqur Rahim (wk); Sabbir Rahman; Mahmudullah Riyad; Soumya Sarkar; Arafat Sunny; Rony Talukdar	Azhar Ali (c); Sarfaraz Ahmed (wk); Mohammad Hafeez; Asad Shafiq; Fawad Alam; Mohammad Rizwan; Haris Sohail; Sohaib Maqsood (withdrawn); Sami Aslam; Saeed Ajmal; Yasir Shah (withdrawn); Wahab Riaz; Rahat Ali; Ehsan Adil (withdrawn); Sohail Khan (withdrawn); Rahat Ali; Saad Nasim; Junaid Khan; Zulfiqar Babar; Umar Gul	Mashrafe Mortaza (c); Shakib Al Hasan (vc); Tamim Iqbal; Mushfiqur Rahim (wk); Rony Talukdar; Soumya Sarkar; Litton Das; Mahmudullah; Nasir Hossain; Sabbir Rahman; Taskin Ahmed; Abul Hasan; Mustafizur Rahman; Arafat Sunny	Shahid Afridi (c); Mukhtar Ahmed; Sarfaraz Ahmed (wk); Saeed Ajmal; Umar Gul; Mohammad Hafeez; Junaid Khan; Sohail Khan (withdrawn); Sohaib Maqsood; Saad Nasim; Wahab Riaz; Mohammad Rizwan; Ahmed Shehzad; Haris Sohail; Sohail Tanvir

== 50-over tour match ==
15 April 2015
09:00
Scorecard

Pakistanis; 268/9 (50 overs)	v	(Bangladesh) BCB XI; 270/9 (48.5 overs)
Mohammad Hafeez 85 (79); Shuvagata Hom 3/39 (7 overs)		Sabbir Rahman 123 (99); Junaid Khan 4/38 (9.5 overs)

BCB XI won by 1 wicket
Khan Shaheb Osman Ali Stadium, Fatullah
Umpires: Enamul Haque (Ban) and Sharfuddoula (Ban)

- Pakistanis won the toss and elected to bat.
- Both sides were able to name up to 13 players in their squads, 11 batting and 11 fielding.

== ODI series ==
=== 1st ODI ===
17 April 2015
14:30 (D/N)
Scorecard

Bangladesh; 329/6 (50 overs)	v	Pakistan; 250 (45.2 overs)
Tamim Iqbal 132 (135); Wahab Riaz 4/59 (10 overs)		Azhar Ali 72 (73); Taskin Ahmed 3/42 (8 overs)

Bangladesh won by 79 runs
Shere Bangla National Stadium, Mirpur
Umpires: Ruchira Palliyaguruge (SL) and Sharfuddoula (Ban)
Player of the match: Mushfiqur Rahim (Ban)

- Bangladesh won the toss and elected to bat.
- Saad Nasim and Mohammad Rizwan (both Pak) made their ODI debuts.
- This was the highest total for Bangladesh in One Day Internationals and their first win over Pakistan since the 1999 Cricket World Cup.

=== 2nd ODI ===
19 April 2015
14:30 (D/N)
Scorecard

Pakistan; 239/6 (50 overs)	v	Bangladesh; 240/3 (38.1 overs)
Saad Nasim 77* (96); Shakib Al Hasan 2/51 (10 overs)		Tamim Iqbal 116* (116); Saeed Ajmal 1/49 (9.1 overs)

Bangladesh won by 7 wickets
Shere Bangla National Stadium, Mirpur
Umpires: Enamul Haque (Ban) and Nigel Llong (Eng)
Player of the match: Tamim Iqbal (Ban)

- Pakistan won the toss and elected to bat.
- This victory gave Bangladesh their first ever series win over Pakistan.

=== 3rd ODI ===
22 April 2015
14:30 (D/N)
Scorecard

Pakistan; 250 (49 overs)	v	Bangladesh; 251/2 (39.3 overs)
Azhar Ali 101 (112); Shakib Al Hasan 2/34 (10 overs)		Soumya Sarkar 127* (110); Junaid Khan 2/67 (7.3 overs)

Bangladesh won by 8 wickets
Shere Bangla National Stadium, Mirpur
Umpires: Ruchira Palliyaguruge (SL) and Sharfuddoula (Ban)
Player of the match: Soumya Sarkar (Ban)

- Pakistan won the toss and elected to bat.
- Sami Aslam (Pak) made his ODI debut.
- Bangladesh white-washed Pakistan for the first time in ODI history.

== T20I series ==
24 April 2015
16:30 (D/N)
Scorecard

Pakistan; 141/5 (20 overs)	v	Bangladesh; 143/3 (16.2 overs)
Mukhtar Ahmed 37 (30); Mustafizur Rahman 2/20 (4 overs)		Shakib Al Hasan 57* (41); Umar Gul 1/23 (2 overs)

Bangladesh won by 7 wickets
Shere Bangla National Stadium, Mirpur
Umpires: Anisur Rahman (Ban) and Sharfuddoula (Ban)
Player of the match: Sabbir Rahman (Ban)

- Pakistan won the toss and elected to bat.
- Mustafizur Rahman and Soumya Sarkar (Ban) and Mohammad Rizwan and Mukhtar Ahmed (Pak) made their T20I debuts.

== Test series ==
=== 1st Test ===
28 April – 2 May 2015
Scorecard

Bangladesh	v	Pakistan
332 (120 overs); Mominul Haque 80 (162); Yasir Shah 3/86 (28 overs)		628 (168.4 overs); Mohammad Hafeez 224 (332); Taijul Islam 6/163 (46.4 overs)
555/6 (136 overs); Tamim Iqbal 206 (278); Mohammad Hafeez 2/82 (20 overs)

Match drawn
Sheikh Abu Naser Stadium, Khulna
Umpires: Nigel Llong (Eng) and Ranmore Martinesz (SL)
Player of the match: Tamim Iqbal (Ban)

- Bangladesh won the toss and elected to bat.
- Mohammad Shahid and Soumya Sarkar (Ban) and Sami Aslam (Pak) made their Test debuts.
- Mohammad Hafeez scored his eighth Test century and became the sixth Pakistan batsman to score a century in three consecutive Tests. Hafeez converted his eighth century into his maiden double century on the third day of the match.
- Imrul Kayes and Tamim Iqbal's partnership of 312 was Bangladesh's highest partnership in Test cricket. It was also the highest opening partnership in a second innings of a Test.

=== 2nd Test ===
6–10 May 2015
Scorecard

Pakistan	v	Bangladesh
557/8d (152 overs); Azhar Ali 226 (428); Taijul Islam 3/179 (51 overs)		203 (47.3 overs); Shakib Al Hasan 89* (91); Yasir Shah 3/58 (15.3 overs)
195/6d (41.1 overs); Misbah-ul-Haq 82 (72); Mohammad Shahid 2/23 (10 overs)		221 (56.5 overs); Mominul Haque 68 (141); Yasir Shah 4/73 (21 overs)

Pakistan won by 328 runs
Shere Bangla National Stadium, Mirpur
Umpires: Nigel Llong (Eng) and Paul Reiffel (Aus)
Player of the match: Azhar Ali (Pak)

- Bangladesh won the toss and elected to field.

== Broadcasters ==
Bangladesh Television and PTV Sports were the official broadcasters of this series in Bangladesh and Pakistan, respectively.
