= South African cricket team in Bangladesh in 2015 =

	Bangladesh	South Africa
- Dates: 3 July 2015 – 3 August 2015
Captains	Mushfiqur Rahim (Tests); Mashrafe Mortaza (ODIs & T20Is)	Hashim Amla (Tests & ODIs); Faf du Plessis (T20Is)

Test series
- Result: 2-match series drawn 0–0
Most runs	Mahmudullah (102)	Dean Elgar (75)
Most wickets	Mustafizur Rahman (4)	Dale Steyn (6)
- Player of the series: Dale Steyn (SA)

One Day International series
- Results: Bangladesh won the 3-match series 2–1
Most runs	Soumya Sarkar (205)	Faf du Plessis (110)
Most wickets	Mustafizur Rahman (5)	Kagiso Rabada (8)
- Player of the series: Soumya Sarkar (Ban)

Twenty20 International series
- Results: South Africa won the 2-match series 2–0
Most runs	Soumya Sarkar (44)	Faf du Plessis (95)
Most wickets	Arafat Sunny, Nasir Hossain (3)	Kyle Abbott, Aaron Phangiso (4)
- Player of the series: Faf du Plessis (SA)

The South African cricket team toured Bangladesh for a two-match International Twenty20 (T20I) series, a three-match One Day International (ODI) series and two Test matches against the Bangladesh national team from 3 July to 3 August 2015.

South Africa won Twenty20 International series by 2–0. Bangladesh won ODI series by 2–1. With this ODI victory, Bangladesh have won four consecutive ODI series in home soil, including series against Zimbabwe (5–0), Pakistan (3–0), India (2–1) and South Africa (2–1). This is the first ODI series victory against South Africa by Bangladesh. The Test series finished with both matches being drawn.

== Squads ==
South Africa's AB de Villiers was originally named as the captain for the ODI series. However, he was unavailable for the first match due to getting a one-match ban for bowling a slow over-rate in the 2015 Cricket World Cup semi-final against New Zealand. South Africa's management decided to release him for the other two matches, so he can spend time with his family, with Hashim Amla taking over as captain.

Tests		ODIs		T20Is	
South Africa	Bangladesh	South Africa	Bangladesh	South Africa	Bangladesh
Hashim Amla (c); Dean Elgar; Reeza Hendricks; Faf du Plessis; Stiaan van Zyl; JP Duminy; Quinton de Kock; Vernon Philander; Dale Steyn; Morne Morkel; Aaron Phangiso; Simon Harmer; Temba Bavuma; Kagiso Rabada; Dane Vilas	Mushfiqur Rahim (c); Tamim Iqbal (vc); Litton Das; Mominul Haque; Shakib Al Hasan; Jubair Hossain; Nasir Hossain; Rubel Hossain; Taijul Islam; Imrul Kayes; Mahmudullah; Mustafizur Rahman; Soumya Sarkar; Mohammad Shahid	~~AB de Villiers~~; Hashim Amla (c); Quinton de Kock; Faf du Plessis; Rilee Rossouw; JP Duminy; David Miller; Farhaan Behardien; Chris Morris; Morne Morkel; Imran Tahir; Kagiso Rabada; Kyle Abbott; Aaron Phangiso; Wayne Parnell; Ryan McLaren	Mashrafe Mortaza (c); Shakib Al Hasan (vc); Litton Das; Anamul Haque; Jubair Hossain; Nasir Hossain; Rubel Hossain; Tamim Iqbal; Mahmudullah; Mushfiqur Rahim; Mustafizur Rahman; Sabbir Rahman; Soumya Sarkar; Arafat Sunny	Faf du Plessis (c); Quinton de Kock; Rilee Rossouw; AB de Villiers; JP Duminy; David Miller; David Wiese; Chris Morris; Kyle Abbott; Kagiso Rabada; Aaron Phangiso; Eddie Leie; Wayne Parnell; Beuran Hendricks	Mashrafe Mortaza (c); Shakib Al Hasan (vc); Litton Das; Sohag Gazi; Jubair Hossain; Nasir Hossain; Rubel Hossain; Tamim Iqbal; Mushfiqur Rahim; Mustafizur Rahman; Sabbir Rahman; Soumya Sarkar; Arafat Sunny; Rony Talukdar

== Tour match ==
=== T20:Bangladesh Cricket Board XI vs South Africans ===
3 July 2015
13:00
Scorecard

Bangladesh Cricket Board XI; 99 (18 overs)	v	South Africans; 101/2 (12 overs)
Imrul Kayes 29 (24); David Wiese 3/13 (3 overs)		Quinton de Kock 35 (24)

South Africans won by 8 wickets
Khan Shaheb Osman Ali Stadium, Fatullah
Umpires: Anisur Rahman (Ban) and Masudur Rahman (Ban)

- Bangladesh Cricket Board XI won the toss and elected to bat.
- Players per side: Bangladesh Cricket Board XI 12 (11 batting, 11 fielding); South Africans 14 (11 batting, 11 fielding).

== T20I series ==
=== 1st T20I ===
5 July 2015
13:00
Scorecard

South Africa; 148/4 (20 overs)	v	Bangladesh; 96 (18.5 overs)
Faf du Plessis 79* (61); Arafat Sunny 2/19 (3 overs)		Shakib Al Hasan 26 (30); JP Duminy 2/11 (4 overs)

South Africa won by 52 runs
Shere Bangla National Stadium, Mirpur
Umpires: Enamul Haque (Ban) and Sharfuddoula (Ban)
Player of the match: Faf du Plessis (SA)

- Bangladesh won the toss and elected to field.
- Litton Das (Ban) made his T20I debut.

=== 2nd T20I ===
7 July 2015
13:00
Scorecard

South Africa; 169/4 (20 overs)	v	Bangladesh; 138 (19.2 overs)
Quinton de Kock 44 (31); Nasir Hossain 2/26 (4 overs)		Soumya Sarkar 37 (21); Eddie Leie 3/16 (3 overs)

South Africa won by 31 runs
Shere Bangla National Stadium, Mirpur
Umpires: Anisur Rahman (Ban) and Enamul Haque (Ban)
Player of the match: Eddie Leie (SA)

- South Africa won the toss and elected to bat.
- Eddie Leie (SA) and Rony Talukdar (Ban) made their T20I debuts.
- Eddie Leie's figures of 3/16 were the best figures for a South African on debut in a T20I.

== ODI series ==
=== 1st ODI ===
10 July 2015
15:00 (D/N)
Scorecard

Bangladesh; 160 (36.3 overs)	v	South Africa; 164/2 (31.1 overs)
Shakib Al Hasan 48 (51); Kagiso Rabada 6/16 (8 overs)		Faf du Plessis 63* (75); Nasir Hossain 1/28 (7 overs)

South Africa won by 8 wickets
Shere Bangla National Stadium, Mirpur
Umpires: Michael Gough (Eng) and Sharfuddoula (Ban)
Player of the match: Kagiso Rabada (SA)

- Bangladesh won the toss and elected to bat.
- Rain delayed the start of the match and reduced the game to 40 overs per side.
- Kagiso Rabada (SA) made his ODI debut.
- Kagiso Rabada became the second bowler to take an ODI hat-trick on debut and finished with the best figures for any bowler on debut.

=== 2nd ODI ===
12 July 2015
15:00 (D/N)
Scorecard

South Africa; 162 (46 overs)	v	Bangladesh; 167/3 (27.4 overs)
Faf du Plessis 41 (64); Nasir Hossain 3/26 (8 overs)		Soumya Sarkar 88* (79); Kagiso Rabada 2/45 (7 overs)

Bangladesh won by 7 wickets
Shere Bangla National Stadium, Mirpur
Umpires: Enamul Haque (Ban) and Richard Illingworth (Eng)
Player of the match: Soumya Sarkar (Ban)

- South Africa won the toss and elected to bat.

=== 3rd ODI ===
15 July 2015
15:00 (D/N)
Scorecard

South Africa; 168/9 (40 overs)	v	Bangladesh; 170/1 (26.1 overs)
JP Duminy 51 (70); Shakib Al Hasan 3/33 (8 overs)		Soumya Sarkar 90 (75); Imran Tahir 1/37 (6.1 overs)

Bangladesh won by 9 wickets (DLS method)
Zahur Ahmed Chowdhury Stadium, Chittagong
Umpires: Michael Gough (Eng) and Sharfuddoula (Ban)
Player of the match: Soumya Sarkar (Ban)

- South Africa won the toss and elected to bat.
- Rain stopped the South African innings with the score at 78/4 in the 23rd over. After the rain delay, the match was reduced to 40 overs per side.
- This win gave Bangladesh their first ODI series win against South Africa and four consecutive ODI series wins in home soil.

== Test series ==
=== 1st Test ===
21–25 July 2015
Scorecard

South Africa	v	Bangladesh
248 (83.4 overs); Temba Bavuma 54 (108); Mustafizur Rahman 4/37 (17.4 overs)		326 (116.1 overs); Mahmudullah 67 (138); Dale Steyn 3/78 (22.1 overs)
61/0 (21 overs); Stiaan van Zyl 33* (71)

Match drawn
Zohur Ahmed Chowdhury Stadium, Chittagong
Umpires: Richard Kettleborough (Eng) and Joel Wilson (WI)
Player of the match: Mustafizur Rahman (Ban)

- South Africa won the toss and elected to bat.
- Rain stopped play at 15:15 on day 2 with no further play possible for the day. Bad light stopped play at 16:20 on day 3 and no further play was possible for the day. No play was possible on day 4 and day 5 due to heavy rain.
- Mustafizur Rahman (Ban) made his Test debut.
- Joel Wilson (WI) stood in his first Test match as an umpire.

=== 2nd Test ===
30 July–3 August 2015
Scorecard

Bangladesh	v	South Africa
246/8 (88.1 overs); Mushfiqur Rahim 65 (125); JP Duminy 3/27 (15 overs)

Match drawn
Shere Bangla National Stadium, Mirpur
Umpires: Richard Kettleborough (Eng) and Paul Reiffel (Aus)
Player of the match: Mushfiqur Rahim (Ban)

- Bangladesh won the toss and elected to bat.
- No play was possible on day 2, day 3 and day 4 due to heavy rain. On the fifth day, the outfield was deemed unfit to play and the match was called off.
- Dane Vilas (SA) made his Test debut.
- Dale Steyn (SA) took his 400th Test wicket when he dismissed Tamim Iqbal. He became the fastest to take 400 wickets in terms of balls bowled.
