= Zimbabwean cricket team in Bangladesh in 2015–16 =

International cricket tour

Zimbabwean cricket team in Bangladesh in November 2015
	Bangladesh	Zimbabwe
- Dates: 5 November 2015 – 15
Captains	Mashrafe Mortaza	Elton Chigumbura

One Day International series
- Results: Bangladesh won the 3-match series 3–0
Most runs	Mushfiqur Rahim (156)	Elton Chigumbura (133)
Most wickets	Mustafizur Rahman (8)	Tinashe Panyangara (5)
- Player of the series: Mushfiqur Rahim (Ban)

Twenty20 International series
- Results: 2-match series drawn 1–1
Most runs	Tamim Iqbal (52)	Malcolm Waller (108)
Most wickets	Al-Amin Hossain (5)	Graeme Cremer (5)
- Player of the series: Malcolm Waller (Zim)

The Zimbabwean cricket team toured Bangladesh in November 2015. In January 2016, the BCB confirmed a further four T20I matches to be played later the same month in Bangladesh as preparation for the Asia Cup and the World Twenty20.

== November 2015 ==
The November fixtures consisted of three One Day Internationals (ODIs), two Twenty20 Internationals (T20Is) and a tour match.

Originally, the tour was scheduled to comprise three Test matches, five ODIs and three T20Is, but the Bangladesh Cricket Board (BCB) reduced it to two Tests, three ODIs and three T20Is. This was because of Bangladesh's preparation for the Asia Cup tournament. The Tests, originally scheduled in January 2016, were brought forward to November 2015. Zimbabwe were going to play the two Tests in Bangladesh, before returning in January 2016 to complete the limited-overs fixtures.

However, on 16 October 2015, the BCB announced that the Tests would be substituted for limited-overs matches. These would consist of four to five matches and be completed by 22 November, when the Bangladesh Premier League starts. The dates for the tour were confirmed by the BCB on 21 October 2015.

Bangladesh won the ODI series 3–0 and the T20I series was drawn 1–1.

== November squads ==
ODIs		T20Is	
Bangladesh	Zimbabwe	Bangladesh	Zimbabwe
Mashrafe Mortaza (c); Litton Das; Shakib Al Hasan; Jubair Hossain; Al-Amin Hossain; Nasir Hossain; Tamim Iqbal; Mahmudullah; Mushfiqur Rahim; Mustafizur Rahman; Sabbir Rahman; Kamrul Islam Rabbi; ~~Soumya Sarkar~~; Arafat Sunny; Imrul Kayes	Elton Chigumbura (c); Regis Chakabva; Chamu Chibhabha; Tendai Chisoro; Graeme Cremer; Craig Ervine; Luke Jongwe; Neville Madziva; Wellington Masakadza; Richmond Mutumbami; Taurai Muzarabani; John Nyumbu; Tinashe Panyangara; Sikandar Raza; Malcolm Waller; Sean Williams	Mashrafe Mortaza (c); Litton Das; Al-Amin Hossain; Anamul Haque; Jubair Hossain; Nasir Hossain; Tamim Iqbal; Imrul Kayes; Mahmudullah; Kamrul Islam Rabbi; Mustafizur Rahman; Sabbir Rahman; Mushfiqur Rahim; Arafat Sunny	Elton Chigumbura (c); Regis Chakabva; Chamu Chibhabha; Tendai Chisoro; Graeme Cremer; Craig Ervine; Luke Jongwe; Neville Madziva; Wellington Masakadza; Richmond Mutumbami; Taurai Muzarabani; John Nyumbu; Tinashe Panyangara; Sikandar Raza; Malcolm Waller; Sean Williams

Bangladesh's Soumya Sarkar was ruled out of the ODI series because of an injury. He was replaced by Imrul Kayes.

== November tour match ==
=== Bangladesh Cricket Board XI v Zimbabweans ===
5 November
Scorecard

Bangladesh Cricket Board XI; 277/8 (50 overs)	v	Zimbabweans; 281/3 (46.4 overs)
Mushfiqur Rahim 81* (84); Luke Jongwe 3/20 (5 overs)		Craig Ervine 95 (99); Sunzamul Islam 2/70 (10 overs)

Zimbabweans won by 7 wickets
Khan Shaheb Osman Ali Stadium, Fatullah
Umpires: Enamul Haque (Ban) and Sharfuddoula (Ban)

- Zimbabweans won the toss and elected to field.
- 16 players per side (11 batting, 11 fielding).

== November ODI series ==
=== 1st ODI ===
7 November
13:00 (D/N)
Scorecard

Bangladesh; 273/9 (50 overs)	v	Zimbabwe; 128 (36.1 overs)
Mushfiqur Rahim 107 (109); Sikandar Raza 2/47 (7 overs)		Elton Chigumbura 41 (51); Shakib Al Hasan 5/47 (10 overs)

Bangladesh won by 145 runs
Shere Bangla National Stadium, Mirpur
Umpires: Aleem Dar (Pak) and Sharfuddoula (Ban)
Player of the match: Mushfiqur Rahim (Ban)

- Zimbabwe won the toss and elected to field.

=== 2nd ODI ===
9 November
13:00 (D/N)
Scorecard

Bangladesh; 241/9 (50 overs)	v	Zimbabwe; 183 (43.2 overs)
Imrul Kayes 76 (89); Tinashe Panyangara 3/41 (10 overs)		Elton Chigumbura 47 (77); Mustafizur Rahman 3/33 (8 overs)

Bangladesh won by 58 runs
Shere Bangla National Stadium, Mirpur
Umpires: Aleem Dar (Pak) and Enamul Haque (Ban)
Player of the match: Imrul Kayes (Ban)

- Zimbabwe won the toss and elected to field.

=== 3rd ODI ===
11 November
13:00 (D/N)
Scorecard

Bangladesh; 276/9 (50 overs)	v	Zimbabwe; 215 (43.3 overs)
Imrul Kayes 73 (95); Luke Jongwe 2/50 (9 overs)		Sean Williams 64 (84); Mustafizur Rahman 5/34 (8 overs)

Bangladesh won by 61 runs
Shere Bangla National Stadium, Mirpur
Umpires: Aleem Dar (Pak) and Sharfuddoula (Ban)
Player of the match: Tamim Iqbal (Ban)

- Bangladesh won the toss and elected to bat.

== November T20I series ==
=== 1st T20I ===
13 November
17:00 (D/N)
Scorecard

Zimbabwe; 131 (19.3 overs)	v	Bangladesh; 136/6 (17.4 overs)
Malcolm Waller 68 (31); Mustafizur Rahman 2/16 (3.3 overs)		Tamim Iqbal 31 (28); Graeme Cremer 3/29 (4 overs)

Bangladesh won by 4 wickets
Shere Bangla National Stadium, Mirpur
Umpires: Anisur Rahman (Ban) and Enamul Haque (Ban)
Player of the match: Malcolm Waller (Zim)

- Bangladesh won the toss and elected to field.
- Jubair Hossain (Ban) made his T20I debut.
- Malcolm Waller (Zim) scored the fastest T20I fifty (20 balls) by a Zimbabwean cricketer.

=== 2nd T20I ===
15 November
17:00 (D/N)
Scorecard

Bangladesh; 135/9 (20 overs)	v	Zimbabwe; 136/7 (19.5 overs)
Anamul Haque 47 (51); Tinashe Panyangara 3/30 (4 overs)		Malcolm Waller 40 (27); Al-Amin Hossain 3/20 (4 overs)

Zimbabwe won by 3 wickets
Shere Bangla National Stadium, Mirpur
Umpires: Anisur Rahman (Ban) and Sharfuddoula (Ban)
Player of the match: Neville Madziva (Zim)

- Bangladesh won the toss and elected to bat.

== January 2016 ==
Zimbabwean cricket team in Bangladesh in January 2016
	Bangladesh	Zimbabwe
- Dates: 15 January 2016 – 22 January 2016
Captains	Mashrafe Mortaza	Elton Chigumbura (1st & 4th T20Is); Hamilton Masakadza (2nd & 3rd T20Is)

Twenty20 International series
- Results: 4-match series drawn 2–2
Most runs	Sabbir Rahman (140)	Hamilton Masakadza (222)
Most wickets	Shakib Al Hasan (5)	Graeme Cremer (6)
- Player of the series: Hamilton Masakadza (Zim)

In January 2016 four more T20I matches were announced by the BCB, all to be played at the Sheikh Abu Naser Stadium, Khulna. The series was drawn 2–2. The series was named the Walton T20 Cricket Series. Zimbabwe's Hamilton Masakadza set a world record for the most runs scored in a T20I bilateral series, with a total of 222 across the four games. Following the conclusion of the series, Elton Chigumbura stepped down as captain of the Zimbabwe team.

== January 2016 squads ==
Bangladesh	Zimbabwe
Mashrafe Mortaza (c); Tamim Iqbal; Nurul Hasan; Shakib Al Hasan; Abu Hider; Shuvagata Hom; Al-Amin Hossain; Imrul Kayes; Mahmudullah; ~~Mushfiqur Rahim~~; Mustafizur Rahman; Sabbir Rahman; Soumya Sarkar; Arafat Sunny; Mosaddek Hossain; Mohammad Shahid; Muktar Ali; Taskin Ahmed	Elton Chigumbura (c); Malcolm Waller; Peter Moor; Sikandar Raza; Graeme Cremer; Hamilton Masakadza; Wellington Masakadza; Richmond Mutumbami; Sean Williams; Chamu Chibhabha; Neville Madziva; Luke Jongwe; Taurai Muzarabani; Tendai Chisoro; Vusi Sibanda; Brian Vitori

Following the conclusion of the 2nd T20I, Mosaddek Hossain, Mohammad Shahid and Muktar Ali were added to Bangladesh's squad. Mushfiqur Rahim was ruled out of the series after getting a hamstring injury during the first T20I and was replaced by Taskin Ahmed.

== January T20I series ==
=== 1st T20I ===
15 January
Scorecard

Zimbabwe; 163/7 (20 overs)	v	Bangladesh; 166/6 (18.4 overs)
Hamilton Masakadza 79 (53); Mustafizur Rahman 2/18 (4 overs)		Sabbir Rahman 46 (36); Graeme Cremer 2/32 (4 overs)

Bangladesh won by 4 wickets
Sheikh Abu Naser Stadium, Khulna
Umpires: Enamul Haque (Ban) and Sharfuddoula (Ban)
Player of the match: Hamilton Masakadza (Zim)

- Zimbabwe won the toss and elected to bat.
- Nurul Hasan and Shuvagata Hom (Ban) both made their T20I debuts.

=== 2nd T20I ===
17 January
Scorecard

Bangladesh; 167/3 (20 overs)	v	Zimbabwe; 125/8 (20 overs)
Sabbir Rahman 43* (30); Graeme Cremer 1/29 (4 overs)		Hamilton Masakadza 30 (28); Sabbir Rahman 3/11 (2.1 overs)

Bangladesh won by 42 runs
Sheikh Abu Naser Stadium, Khulna
Umpires: Anisur Rahman (Ban) and Sharfuddoula (Ban)
Player of the match: Sabbir Rahman (Ban)

- Bangladesh won the toss and elected to bat.

=== 3rd T20I ===
20 January
Scorecard

Zimbabwe; 187/6 (20 overs)	v	Bangladesh; 156/6 (20 overs)
Malcolm Waller 49 (23); Shakib Al Hasan 3/32 (4 overs)		Sabbir Rahman 50 (46); Graeme Cremer 3/18 (4 overs)

Zimbabwe won by 31 runs
Sheikh Abu Naser Stadium, Khulna
Umpires: Anisur Rahman (Ban) and Enamul Haque (Ban)
Player of the match: Malcolm Waller (Zim)

- Zimbabwe won the toss and elected to bat.
- Rain stopped play seven overs into Zimbabwe's innings. Play resumed 20 minutes later, with no loss in overs.
- Abu Hider, Mohammad Shahid, Mosaddek Hossain and Muktar Ali (Ban) all made their T20I debuts.

=== 4th T20I ===
22 January
Scorecard

Zimbabwe; 180/4 (20 overs)	v	Bangladesh; 162 (19 overs)
Hamilton Masakadza 93* (58); Taskin Ahmed 1/32 (3.5 overs)		Mahmudullah 54 (41); Tendai Chisoro 3/17 (4 overs)

Zimbabwe won by 18 runs
Sheikh Abu Naser Stadium, Khulna
Umpires: Enamul Haque (Ban) and Sharfuddoula (Ban)
Player of the match: Hamilton Masakadza (Zim)

- Zimbabwe won the toss and elected to bat.
- Hamilton Masakadza's score of 93 not out is the highest score for a Zimbabwean player in a T20I match.
