= 2015 Bangladesh Premier League final =

2015 Bangladesh Premier League Final
- Event: 2015 Bangladesh Premier League
Barisal Bulls	Comilla Victorians
156/4	157/7
20 overs	20 overs
- Date: 15 December 2015
- Venue: Sher-e-Bangla National Cricket Stadium, Mirpur, Dhaka
- Player of the match: Alok Kapali (Comilla Victorians)
- Umpires: Ranmore Martinesz; Ahsan Raza

The 2015 Bangladesh Premier League Final was a day/night Twenty20 cricket match played between the Barisal Bulls and the Comilla Victorians on 15 December 2015 at the Sher-e-Bangla National Cricket Stadium, Dhaka. The match would determine the winner of the 2015 Bangladesh Premier League, a professional Twenty20 cricket league in Bangladesh. The Victorians defeated the Bulls by three wickets.

The Victorians, captained by Mashrafe Mortaza, topped the group stage table, whereas the Bulls, led by Mahmudullah, stood at the third position. The Victorians beat Rangpur Riders in the Qualifier 1 and went to final. The Bulls defeated Dhaka Dynamites and Rangpur Riders respectively in Eliminator and Qualifier 2 of semi-finals and went to final. The match was telecast on Channel 9.

The total attendance of the match was 25500.(Reference from BCB). Winning the toss, the Victorians' captain Mashrafe Mortaza elected to field first. The Bulls scored 156 runs in 20 overs with a loss of 4 wickets. Batting at number five, Mahmudullah top-scored for the Bulls with 48 runs. The Victorians' bowler Darren Stevens took one wickets with 6.33 economy rate. The Bulls scored 23 in the opening partnership. However, due to contributions from the middle order, it reached the winning total in the last ball and earned the 2015 Bangladesh Premier League title. Alok Kapali, who was the best performer for the Victorians with bat, was named the man of the match.

== Route to final ==
Comilla was ranked first on the league table, though Barisal was ranked third in the group stage, as per NRR. Both team won seven, and lost three matches. Comilla won the qualifier 1 match and grabbed the final. Barisal won the eliminator and qualifier 2 one after one, booking their place in the final.

=== Group stage ===
Group stage procession
Team	Group matches									
Team	1	2	3	4	5	6	7	8	9	10
Barisal Bulls	2	4	4	6	8	10	10	12	12	14
Comilla Victorians	0	2	4	6	6	8	10	10	12	14

Won	Lost

Note: The points at the end of each group match are listed.
Note: Click on the points to see the summary for the match.

=== Play-off ===
Semifinals
12 December — Sher-e-Bangla National Cricket Stadium, Dhaka
1	Comilla Victorians	163/7
2	Rangpur Riders	91/10
12 December — Sher-e-Bangla National Cricket Stadium, Dhaka
3	Barisal Bulls	135/5
4	Dhaka Dynamites	117/8

Preliminary final
13 December — Sher-e-Bangla National Cricket Stadium, Dhaka
2	Rangpur Riders	160/9
3	Barisal Bulls	163/5

Final
15 December — Sher-e-Bangla National Cricket Stadium, Dhaka
1	Comilla Victorians	157/7
3	Barisal Bulls	156/4

==== Semifinal ====
Qualifier 1
12 December
15:30
Scorecard

Comilla Victorians; 163/7	v	Rangpur Riders; 91/10 (17 overs)
Imrul Kayes 67 (48); Thisara Perera 5/26 (4 overs)		Lendl Simmons 25 (20); Ashar Zaidi 4/11 (4 overs)

Comilla Victorians won by 72 runs
Sher-e-Bangla National Cricket Stadium, Dhaka
Umpires: Enamul Haque (Ban) and Ranmore Martinesz (SL)
Player of the match: Ashar Zaidi (Comilla)

- Rangpur Riders won the toss and elected to field
- Comilla Victorians advance to final and Rangpur Riders will compete in qualifier 2.

Eliminator
12 December
18:30
Scorecard

Barisal Bulls; 135/5	v	Dhaka Dynamites; 117/8
Sabbir Rahman 41 (39); Mustafizur Rahman 2/21 (4 overs)		Mosaddek Hossain 26 (27); Al-Amin Hossain 3/15 (4 overs)

Barisal Bulls won by 18 runs
Sher-e-Bangla National Cricket Stadium, Dhaka
Umpires: Ahsan Raza (Pak) and Gazi Sohel (Ban)
Player of the match: Al-Amin Hossain (Barisal)

- Dhaka Dynamites won the toss and elected to field
- Barisal Bulls qualify for the qualifier 2 and Dhaka Dynamites eliminate from the tournament.

Qualifier 2
13 December
18:30
Scorecard

Rangpur Riders; 160/9	v	Barisal Bulls; 163/5 (19.3 overs)
Lendl Simmons 73 (57); Kevon Cooper 4/39 (4 overs)		Sabbir Rahman 79 (49); Arafat Sunny 1/18 (3 overs)

Barisal Bulls won by 5 wickets
Sher-e-Bangla National Cricket Stadium, Dhaka
Umpires: Enamul Haque (Ban) and Ranmore Martinesz (SL)
Player of the match: Sabbir Rahman (Barisal)

- Rangpur Riders won the toss and elected to bat
- Barisal Bulls advance to final.
