= 2015–16 Bangladesh Premier League =

Cricket Tournament

2015 Bangladesh Premier League
- 2015 BPL Logo
- Dates: 22 November 2015 – 15 December 2015
- Administrator: Bangladesh Cricket Board
- Cricket format: Twenty20
- Tournament format(s): Double round-robin and playoffs
- Host: Bangladesh
- Champions: Comilla Victorians (1st title)
- Runners-up: Barisal Bulls
- Participants: 6
- Matches: 34
- Player of the series: Ashar Zaidi (Comilla Victorians)
- Most runs: Kumar Sangakkara (Dhaka Dynamites) (349)
- Most wickets: Kevon Cooper (Barisal Bulls) (22)
- Official website: BPL

The Bangladesh Premier League 2015, also known as BPL Season 3 or BRB Cables BPL 2015 (for sponsorship reasons), was the third season of the Bangladesh Premier League (BPL), a twenty20 cricket league established by the Bangladesh Cricket Board in 2012. The tournament featured six teams during the third season. The season began on Friday, 20 November 2015, with a lavish opening ceremony held at Sher-e-Bangla National Cricket Stadium in Dhaka, and the annual kickoff game was held between Chittagong Vikings and Rangpur Riders, which resulted in the Rangpur winning by two wickets in a last-ball finish.

The championship game was held on 15 December 2015, in which Comilla Victorians won the championship by defeating Barisal Bulls by three wickets. Alok Kapali from Comilla Victorians was awarded player of the match in the final for his match winning 39 from 28 balls. Ashar Zaidi was awarded the player of the tournament for his all-round performance of 215 runs and 17 wickets throughout the tournament. Ashar Zaidi of Comilla Victorians was also named Most valuable player (MVP), while Abu Hider was the find of the tournament.

== Players' draft ==
The draft was held on 22 October 2015 in Dhaka. Six franchises participated in the draft method. Players from Category A-D were picked in the draft by six teams. The icon players and platinum category players were excluded from the draft process. Chris Gayle was picked up by Barisal Bulls for 1.65 crores (US$210,000). Total 319 players took part in the draft process, and 82 players were drafted. The six icon players were selected through lottery process.

== Opening ceremony ==
The third season of the tournament was officially launched at the Sher-e-Bangla National Cricket Stadium in Mirpur on 20 November 2015. During the opening ceremony, All six teams, along with their owners and captains were introduced. The opening ceremony featured live performances from Chirkutt Band, Ayub Bachchu, Momtaz Begum, KK, Jacqueline Fernandez, and Hrithik Roshan. The total cost of the opening ceremony was reported to be 3.5 crores.

== Venues ==
A total of 34 matches including the championship game was held in two venues. The first and third leg of the tournament was played at Dhaka while the second leg was held at the port city Chittagong. Sher-e-Bangla National Cricket Stadium hosted 26 matches while Zahur Ahmed Chowdhury Stadium hosted the eight group stage matches.

| Chittagong | Dhaka |
|---|---|
| Zahur Ahmed Chowdhury Stadium | Sher-e-Bangla National Cricket Stadium |
| Capacity: 22,000 | Capacity: 25,000 |
| Zahur Ahmed Chowdhury Stadium | Sher-e-Bangla National Cricket Stadium |
2015–16 Bangladesh Premier League is located in Bangladesh

== Teams and standings ==
| Pos | Team | Pld | W | L | NR | Pts | NRR |
|---|---|---|---|---|---|---|---|
| 1 | Comilla Victorians (C) | 10 | 7 | 3 | 0 | 14 | 0.788 |
| 2 | Barisal Bulls (R) | 10 | 7 | 3 | 0 | 14 | 0.063 |
| 3 | Rangpur Riders (3) | 10 | 7 | 3 | 0 | 14 | 0.693 |
| 4 | Dhaka Dynamites (4) | 10 | 4 | 6 | 0 | 8 | −0.010 |
| 5 | Sylhet Super Stars | 10 | 3 | 7 | 0 | 6 | −0.710 |
| 6 | Chittagong Vikings | 10 | 2 | 8 | 0 | 4 | −0.828 |

- The top four teams qualified for the playoffs
- advanced to the Qualifier
- advanced to the Eliminator

== Squads ==
| Barisal Bulls | Chittagong Vikings | Comilla Victorians | Dhaka Dynamites | Rangpur Riders | Sylhet Super Stars |
|---|---|---|---|---|---|
| Mahmudullah Riyad (c); Brendan Taylor (vc); Chris Gayle; Sabbir Rahman; Shahriar Nafees; Rony Talukdar; Evin Lewis; Mehedi Maruf; Nadif Chowdhury; Nikhil Dutta; Suhrawadi Shuvo; Imad Wasim; Seekkuge Prasanna; Mohammad Sharifullah; Mohammad Sami; Kevon Cooper; Sohag Gazi; Taijul Islam; Al-Amin Hossain; Sajedul Islam; Rayad Emrit | Tamim Iqbal (c); Tillakaratne Dilshan (vc); Nafees Iqbal; Asif Hasan; Anamul Haque; Umar Akmal; Kamran Akmal; Naeem Islam; Yasir Ali; Asif Ahmed; Ziaur Rahman; Elton Chigumbura; Shafiul Islam; Enamul Haque Jr; Saeed Ajmal; Elias Sunny; Jeevan Mendis; Mohammad Amir; Taskin Ahmed; Robiul Islam; Chamara Kapugedera; Bilawal Bhatti | Mashrafe Mortaza (c); Shoaib Malik (vc); Abu Hider; Ahmed Shehzad; Darren Stevens; Imrul Kayes; Liton Das; Dhiman Ghosh; Shuvagata Hom; Marlon Samuels; Alok Kapali; Mahmudul Hasan; Naeem Islam Jr; Ariful Haque; Nuwan Kulasekara; Kamrul Islam Rabbi; Sunzamul Islam; Sunil Narine; Krishmar Santokie; Ashar Zaidi; Andre Russell | Kumar Sangakkara (c); Nasir Hossain (vc); Shadman Islam; Nasir Jamshed; Yasir Shah; Shamsur Rahman; Irfan Sukkur; Lahiru Thirimanne; Abul Hasan; Farhad Reza; Mosaddek Hossain; Mohammad Irfan; Nabil Samad; Shykat Ali; Mosharraf Hossain; Mustafizur Rahman; Ryan ten Doeschate; Malcolm Waller; Shadman Islam | Shakib Al Hasan (c); Misbah-ul-Haq (vc); Lendl Simmons; Soumya Sarkar; Jahurul Islam; Abdullah Al Mamun; Mithun Ali; Darren Sammy; Thisara Perera; Mohammad Nabi; Murad Khan; Sachithra Senanayake; Wahab Riaz; Arafat Sunny; Saqlain Sajib; Mukhtar Ali; Abu Jayed; Al-Amin | Shahid Afridi (c); Mushfiqur Rahim (vc); Dilshan Munaweera; Brad Hodge; Joshua Cobb; Junaid Siddique; Nurul Hasan; Ravi Bopara; Mominul Haque; Chris Jordan; Sohail Tanvir; Nazmul Hossain Milon; Rubel Hossain; Abdur Razzak; Mohammad Shahid; Nazmul Hossain; Ajantha Mendis; Fidel Edwards; Abu Sayem Chowdhury; Subashis Roy |

== Matches ==
=== Phase 1 ===
22 November
14:00
Scorecard

| Chittagong Vikings; 187/7 (20 overs) | v | Rangpur Riders; 188/8 (20 overs) |
| Tamim Iqbal 51 (32); Saqlain Sajib 3/26 | | Misbah-ul-Haq 61 (37); Mohammad Amir 4/30 |

Rangpur won by 2 wickets
Sher-e-Bangla National Cricket Stadium, Dhaka
Umpires: Enamul Haque (Ban) and Sharfuddoula (Ban)
Player of the match: Misbah-ul-Haq

- Chittagong Vikings won the toss and elected to bat.

22 November
18:15
Scorecard

| Dhaka Dynamites; 112/4 (19.2) | v | Comilla Victorians; 110/8 (20) |
| Nasir Jamshed 44(44); Abu Hider 2/17 (4 Overs) | | Mashrafe Mortaza* 25; Abul Hasan 3/29 (4 overs) |

Dhaka won by 6 wickets
Sher-e-Bangla National Cricket Stadium, Dhaka
Umpires: Enamul Haque (Ban) and Ranmore Martinesz (Sri)
Player of the match: Abul Hassan

- Comilla Victorians won the toss and elected to bat.

23 November
14:00
Scorecard

| Sylhet Super Stars; 179/6 (20 overs) | v | Chittagong Vikings; 180/5 (20 overs) |
| Dilshan Munaweera 64(36); Shafiul Islam 3/25 (4 Overs) | | Tamim Iqbal 69(46); Subashish Roy 1/22 (4 overs) |

Chittagong won by 1 run
Sher-e-Bangla National Cricket Stadium, Dhaka
Umpires: Sharfuddoula (Ban)and Masudur Rahman (Ban)
Player of the match: Shafiul Islam

- Sylhet Super Stars won the toss and elected to field.

23 November
18:15
Scorecard

| Barisal Bulls; 155/9 (20 overs) | v | Rangpur Riders; 142/10 (20 Overs) |
| Mahmudullah Riyad 51 (43); Shakib Al Hasan 3/23 (4 Overs) | | Mithun Ali 55 (32); Kevon Cooper 5/15 (4 Overs) |

Barisal won by 13 Runs
Sher-e-Bangla National Cricket Stadium, Dhaka
Umpires: Enamul Haque (Ban) and Masudur Rahman (Ban)
Player of the match: Kevon Cooper

- Rangpur Riders won the toss and elected to field.

24 November
14:00
Scorecard

| Chittagong Vikings; 176/4 (20 overs) | v | Comilla Victorians; 177/3 (20 Overs) |
| Ziaur Rahman 39 (16); Ashar Zaidi 2/29 (4 Overs) | | Marlon Samuels 69 (52); Mohammad Amir 2/27 (3.5 Overs) |

Comilla won by 7 wickets
Sher-e-Bangla National Cricket Stadium, Dhaka
Umpires: Anisur Rahman (Ban) and Ranmore Martinesz (SL)
Player of the match: Mashrafe Mortaza

- Comilla Victorians won the toss and elected to field.

24 November
18:15
Scorecard

| Barisal Bulls; 108/10 (20 overs) | v | Sylhet Super Stars; 107/9 (20 Overs) |
| Nadif Chowdhury 24 (28); Nazmul Islam 3/18 (4 Overs) | | Dilshan Munaweera 36 (31); Al-Amin Hossain 5/36 (4 Overs) |

Barisal won by 1 Run
Sher-e-Bangla National Cricket Stadium, Dhaka
Umpires: Anisur Rahman (Ban) and Masudur Rahman (Ban)
Player of the match: Al-Amin Hossain

- Barisal Bulls won the toss and elected to bat.

25 November
14:00
Scorecard

| Rangpur Riders; 176/6(20 overs) | v | Dhaka Dynamites; 107/10 (19.4 Overs) |
| Lendl Simmons 51(39); Yasir Shah 2/24 (4 overs) | | Kumar Sangakkara 29(28); Shakib Al Hasan 4/16 (4 Overs) |

Rangpur won by 69 Runs
Sher-e-Bangla National Cricket Stadium, Dhaka
Umpires: Enamul Haque (Ban) and Mahfuzur Rahman (Ban)
Player of the match: Shakib Al Hasan

- Rangpur Riders won the toss and elected to bat.

25 November
18:45
Scorecard

| Barisal Bulls; 89/10 (18.3 overs) | v | Comilla Victorians; 90/2 (18 Overs) |
| Kevon Cooper 22(21); Nuwan Kulasekara 3/8 (4 Overs) | | Mahmudul Hasan 31(43); Kevon Cooper 1/7 (3 Overs) |

Comilla won by 8 wickets
Sher-e-Bangla National Cricket Stadium, Dhaka
Umpires: Masudur Rahman (Ban) and Tanvir Ahmed (Ban)
Player of the match: Nuwan Kulasekara

- Barisal Bulls won the toss and elected to bat.

26 November
14:00
Scorecard

| Rangpur Riders; 109/9 (20 overs) | v | Sylhet Super Stars; 103/10 (19.2 Overs) |
| Shakib Al Hasan 33(37); Mohammad Shahid 4/12 (4 Overs | | Mominul Haque 29(23); Shakib Al Hasan 3/31 (4 Overs) |

Rangpur won by 6 Runs
Sher-e-Bangla National Cricket Stadium, Dhaka
Umpires: Sharfuddoula (Ban) and Tanvir Ahmed (Ban)
Player of the match: Shakib Al Hasan

- Rangpur Riders won the toss and elected to bat.

26 November
18:45
Scorecard

| Chittagong Vikings; 92/10 (18.4 overs) | v | Dhaka Dynamites; 96/4 (17.1 Overs) |
| Naeem Islam 29 (38); Mustafizur Rahman 3/14 (3.4 Overs) | | Shadman Islam 45(47); Naeem Islam 3/7 (3 Overs) |

Dhaka won by 6 Wickets
Sher-e-Bangla National Cricket Stadium, Dhaka
Umpires: Sharfuddoula (Ban) and Ranmore Martinesz (Sri)
Player of the match: Shadman Islam

- Chittagong Vikings won the toss and elected to bat.

27 November
14:00
Scorecard

| Rangpur Riders; 82/10 (20 Overs) | v | Comilla Victorians; 84/1 (11.5 overs) |
| Mithun Ali 28(42); Nuwan Kulasekara 4/12 (4 Overs) | | Marlon Samuels 42 (24); Arafat Sunny 1/13 (3 Overs) |

Comilla won by 9 Wickets
Sher-e-Bangla National Cricket Stadium, Dhaka
Umpires: Mahfuzur Rahman (Ban) and Masudur Rahman (Ban)
Player of the match: Marlon Samuels

- Comilla Victorians won the toss and elected to field.

27 November
18:45
Scorecard

| Dhaka Dynamites; 166/6 (20 Overs) | v | Sylhet Super Stars; 132/10 (19.5 Overs) |
| Kumar Sangakkara 75(56); Muhammad Shahid 2/27 (4 Overs) | | Nurul Hasan 35(22); Mosharraf Hossain 3/15 (4 Overs) |

Dhaka won by 34 Runs
Sher-e-Bangla National Cricket Stadium, Dhaka
Umpires: Mahfuzur Rahman (Ban) and Tanvir Ahmed (Ban)
Player of the match: Kumar Sangakkara

- Dhaka Dynamites won the toss and elected to bat.

=== Phase 2 ===
30 November
14:00
Scorecard

| Barisal Bulls; 211 /3 (20 Overs) | v | Chittagong Vikings; 137/10 (20 Overs) |
| Chris Gayle 122(65)*; Mohammad Amir 2/40 (4 Overs) | | Tamim Iqbal 60(40); Mohammad Sami 5/28 (4 Overs) |

Barisal won by 33 Runs
Zahur Ahmed Chowdhury Stadium, Chittagong
Umpires: Mahfuzur Rahman (Ban) and Tanvir Ahmed (Ban)
Player of the match: Chris Gayle

- Chittagong Vikings won the toss and elected to field.

30 November
18:45
Scorecard

| Comilla Victorians; 164/5 (20 Overs) | v | Sylhet Super Stars; 168/5 (19.4 Overs) |
| Ashar Zaidi 53(36); Ravi Bopara 4/18 (4 Overs) | | Ravi Bopara 50(38); Abu Hider 4/28 (3.4 Overs) |

Sylhet won by 4 wickets
Zahur Ahmed Chowdhury Stadium, Chittagong
Umpires: Enamul Haque (Ban) and Sharfuddoula (Ban)
Player of the match: Ravi Bopara

- Sylhet Super Stars won the toss and elected to field.

1 December
14:00
Scorecard

| Chittagong Vikings; 111/8 (20 Overs) | v | Rangpur Riders; 113/1 (17 Overs) |
| Tamim Iqbal 36(43); Shakib Al Hasan 2/16 (4 Overs) | | Soumya Sarkar 58(56); Shafiul Islam 1/22 (2 Overs) |

Rangpur won by 9 wickets
Zahur Ahmed Chowdhury Stadium, Chittagong
Umpires: Enamul Haque (Ban) and Sharfuddoula (Ban)
Player of the match: Soumya Sarkar

- Chittagong Vikings won the toss and elected to bat.

1 December
18:45
Scorecard

| Dhaka Dynamites; 158/5 (20 overs) | v | Barisal Bulls; 159/1 (18.4 overs) |
| Kumar Sangakkara 60 (47); Seekkuge Prasanna 2/23 (4 overs) | | Evin Lewis 101* (65); Abul Hasan 1/22 (2 overs) |

Barisal won by 9 wickets
Zahur Ahmed Chowdhury Stadium, Chittagong
Umpires: Enamul Haque (Ban) and Ranmore Martinesz (SL)
Player of the match: Evin Lewis

- Barisal Bulls won the toss and elected to field.

2 December
14:00
Scorecard

| Comilla Victorians; 141/7 (20 overs) | v | Dhaka Dynamites; 131/6 (20 overs) |
| Ashar Zaidi 45(29); Yasir Shah2/26 (4 overs) | | Nasir Hossain 32(30); Abu Hider 2/30 (4 overs) |

Comilla Victorians won by 10 runs.
Zahur Ahmed Chowdhury Stadium, Chittagong
Umpires: Mahfuzur Rahman (Ban) and Tanvir Ahmed (Ban)
Player of the match: Ashar Zaidi

- Comilla Victorians won the toss and elected to field.

2 December
18:45
Scorecard

| Sylhet Super Stars; 139/9 (20 overs) | v | Chittagong Vikings; 140/0 (16.1 overs) |
| Shahid Afridi 62(41); Shafiul Islam 2/37 (4 overs) | | Tillakaratne Dilshan 67*(46); Ravi Bopara 0/10 (2 overs) |

Chittagong Vikings won by 10 wickets.
Zahur Ahmed Chowdhury Stadium, Chittagong
Umpires: Anisur Rahman (Ban) and Morshed Ali Khan (Ban)
Player of the match: Tillakaratne Dilshan

- Chittagong Vikings won the toss and elected to field.

3 December
14:00
Scorecard

| Rangpur Riders; 104/9 (20 overs) | v | Barisal Bulls; 75/4 (12.3/13 overs, target 75) |
| Jahurul Islam 24 (32); Al-Amin Hossain 3/30 (4 overs) | | Mahmudullah Riyad 23(18); Arafat Sunny 2/11 (2 overs) |

Barisal Bulls won by 6 wickets (D/L method)
Zahur Ahmed Chowdhury Stadium, Chittagong
Umpires: Anisur Rahman (Ban) and Ranmore Martinesz (SL)
Player of the match: Al-Amin Hossain

- Barisal Bulls won the toss and elected to field.

3 December
18:45
Scorecard

| Chittagong Vikings; 136/5 (20 overs) | v | Comilla Victorians; 142/5 (19.4 overs) |
| Umar Akmal 49(34); Ashar Zaidi 1/18 (4 overs) | | Ahmed Shehzad 37(41); Mohammad Amir 2/22 (4 overs) |

Comilla Victorians won by 5 wickets
Zahur Ahmed Chowdhury Stadium, Chittagong
Umpires: Mahfuzur Rahman (Ban) and Morshed Ali Khan (Ban)
Player of the match: Shoaib Malik

- Comilla Victorians won the toss and elected to field.

=== Phase 3 ===
6 December
14:00
Scorecard

| Barisal Bulls; 58/10 (16 Overs) | v | Sylhet Super Stars; 62/1 (11.2 Overs) |
| Mohammad Sami 16(23); Ravi Bopara 3/12 (4 overs) | | Junaid Siddique 34(37); Mohammad Sami 1/9 (3 overs) |

Sylhet Super Stars won by 9 wickets
Sher-e-Bangla National Cricket Stadium, Dhaka
Umpires: Gazi Sohel (Ban) and Ranmore Martinesz (SL)
Player of the match: Junaid Siddique

- Sylhet Superstars won the toss and elected to field.

6 December
18:45
Scorecard

| Rangpur Riders; 135/7 (20 Overs) | v | Dhaka Dynamites; 136/4 (18.2 Overs) |
| Nasir Hossain 30(28); Shakib Al Hasan 1/16 (4 overs) | | Jahurul Islam 35(26); Mustafizur Rahman 1/5 (3 overs) |

Rangpur Riders won by 5 wickets
Sher-e-Bangla National Cricket Stadium, Dhaka
Umpires: Ahsan Raza (PAK) and Enamul Haque (BAN)
Player of the match: Jahurul Islam

- Dhaka Dynamites won the toss and elected to bat.

7 December
14:00
Scorecard

| Comilla Victorians; 105/6 (20 Overs) | v | Barisal Bulls; 106/3 (17.3 Overs) |
| Mahmudullah Riyad 26(27); Ashar Zaidi 2/12 (4 overs) | | Ahmed Shehzad 76(63); Al-Amin Hossain 1/11 (3 overs) |

Barisal Bulls won by 7 wickets
Sher-e-Bangla National Cricket Stadium, Dhaka
Umpires: Ahsan Raza (PAK) and Masudur Rahman (BAN)
Player of the match: Ahmed Shehzad

- Comilla Victorians won the toss and elected to field.

7 December
18:15
Scorecard

| Sylhet Super Stars; 59/10 (11.5 overs) | v | Rangpur Riders; 60/2 (9.5 overs) |
| Sohail Tanvir 20(17); Arafat Sunny 4/14 (4 overs) | | Shakib Al Hasan 29 (24); Mohammad Shahid 2/18 |

Rangpur Riders won by 8 wickets
Sher-e-Bangla National Cricket Stadium, Dhaka
Umpires: Anisur Rahman (BAN) and Gazi Sohel (BAN)
Player of the match: Shakib Al Hasan

- Rangpur Riders won the toss and elected to field.

8 December
14:00
Scorecard

| Chittagong Vikings; 121/8 (20 overs) | v | Dhaka Dynamites; 76/10 (16.4 overs) |
| Kumar Sangakkara 38(36); Mohammad Amir 3/18 (4 overs) | | Umar Akmal 14(22); Mosharraf Hossain 4/16 |

Dhaka Dynamites won by 45 runs
Sher-e-Bangla National Cricket Stadium, Dhaka
Umpires: Ahsan Raza (PAK) and Masudur Rahman (BAN)
Player of the match: Mosharraf Hossain

- Chittagong Vikings won the toss and elected to field.

8 December
18:45
Scorecard

| Comilla Victorians; 132/10 (19.5 overs) | v | Rangpur Riders; 153/6 (20 overs) |
| Imrul Kayes 38(24); Thisara Perera 3/18 (4 overs) | | Jahurul Islam 62(50); Abu Hider 2/28 |

Rangpur Riders won by 4 wickets
Sher-e-Bangla National Cricket Stadium, Dhaka
Umpires: Gazi Sohel (BAN) and Ranmore Martinesz (SL)
Player of the match: Jahurul Islam

- Comilla Victorians won the toss and elected to field.

9 December
14:00
Scorecard

| Sylhet Super Stars; 162/4 (19.5 overs) | v | Dhaka Dynamites; 157/5 (20 overs) |
| Ravi Bopara 55(40); Farhad Reza 2/42 (3.5 overs) | | Kumar Sangakkara 48(35); Abdur Razzak 2/9 (2 overs) |

Sylhet Super Stars won by 6 wickets
Sher-e-Bangla National Cricket Stadium, Dhaka
Umpires: Mahfuzur Rahman (BAN) and Masudur Rahman (BAN)
Player of the match: Shahid Afridi

- Sylhet Super Stars won the toss and elected to field.

9 December
18:45
Scorecard

| Chittagong Vikings; 137/7 (20 overs) | v | Barisal Bulls; 141/2 (20 overs) |
| Tillakaratne Dilshan 28(27); Kevon Cooper 2/24 | | Chris Gayle 92(47); Taskin Ahmed 1/23 (3 overs) |

Barisal Bulls won by 8 wickets
Sher-e-Bangla National Cricket Stadium, Dhaka
Umpires: Ahsan Raza (PAK) and Gazi Sohel (BAN)
Player of the match: Chris Gayle

- Barisal Bulls won the toss and elected to field.

10 December
14:00
Scorecard

| Comilla Victorians; 150/4 (20 overs) | v | Sylhet Super Stars; 79/10 (13.5 overs) |
| Ahmed Shehzad 42(31); Shahid Afridi 1/20 (4 overs) | | Josh Cobb 21(18); Shuvagata Hom 3/8 (3 overs) |

Comilla Victorians won by 71 runs
Sher-e-Bangla National Cricket Stadium, Dhaka
Umpires: Ahsan Raza (PAK) and Enamul Haque (Ban)
Player of the match: Ahmed Shehzad

- Sylhet Super Stars won the toss and elected to field.

10 December
18:45
Scorecard

| Barisal Bulls; 136/6 (20 overs) | v | Dhaka Dynamites; 137/8 (19.4 overs) |
| Mosaddek Hossain 30*(31); Nikhil Dutta 3/18 (4 overs) | | Rayad Emrit 54*(28); Mosharraf Hossain 3/29 (4 overs) |

Barisal Bulls won by 2 wickets
Sher-e-Bangla National Cricket Stadium, Dhaka
Umpires: Gazi Sohel (Ban) and Ranmore Martinesz (SL)
Player of the match: Rayad Emrit

- Barisal Bulls won the toss and elected to field.

== Playoffs ==
Semifinals
12 December — SBNCS, Dhaka
1 | Comilla Victorians | 163/7
2 | Rangpur Riders | 91/10
12 December — SBNCS, Dhaka
3 | Barisal Bulls | 135/5
4 | Dhaka Dynamites | 117/8

Preliminary final
13 December — SBNCS, Dhaka
2 | Rangpur Riders | 160/9
3 | Barisal Bulls | 163/5

Final
15 December — SBNCS, Dhaka
1 | Comilla Victorians | 157/7
3 | Barisal Bulls | 156/4

=== Qualifier 1 ===
12 December
15:30
Scorecard

| Comilla Victorians; 163/7 (20 overs) | v | Rangpur Riders; 91/10 (17 overs) |
| Imrul Kayes 67 (48); Thisara Perera 5/26 (4 overs) | | Lendl Simmons 25 (20); Ashar Zaidi 4/11 (4 overs) |

Comilla Victorians won by 72 runs
Sher-e-Bangla National Cricket Stadium, Dhaka
Umpires: Enamul Haque (Ban) and Ranmore Martinesz (SL)
Player of the match: Ashar Zaidi (Comilla)

- Rangpur Riders won the toss and elected to field
- Comilla Victorians advance to final and Rangpur Riders will compete in qualifier 2.

=== Eliminator ===
12 December
18:30
Scorecard

| Barisal Bulls; 135/5 (20 overs) | v | Dhaka Dynamites; 117/8 (20 overs) |
| Sabbir Rahman 41 (39); Mustafizur Rahman 2/21 (4 overs) | | Mosaddek Hossain 26 (27); Al-Amin Hossain 3/15 (4 overs) |

Barisal Bulls won by 18 runs
Sher-e-Bangla National Cricket Stadium, Dhaka
Umpires: Ahsan Raza (Pak) and Gazi Sohel (Ban)
Player of the match: Al-Amin Hossain (Barisal)

- Dhaka Dynamites won the toss and elected to field
- Barisal Bulls qualify for the qualifier 2 and Dhaka Dynamites eliminate from the tournament.

=== Qualifier 2 ===
13 December
18:30
Scorecard

| Rangpur Riders; 160/9 (20 overs) | v | Barisal Bulls; 163/5 (19.3 overs) |
| Lendl Simmons 73 (57); Kevon Cooper 4/39 (4 overs) | | Sabbir Rahman 79 (49); Arafat Sunny 1/18 (3 overs) |

Barisal Bulls won by 5 wickets
Sher-e-Bangla National Cricket Stadium, Dhaka
Umpires: Enamul Haque (Ban) and Ranmore Martinesz (SL)
Player of the match: Sabbir Rahman (Barisal)

- Rangpur Riders won the toss and elected to bat
- Barisal Bulls advance to final.

=== Final ===
15 December
15:30
Scorecard

| Comilla Victorians; 157/7 (20 overs) | v | Barisal Bulls; 156/4 (20 overs) |
| Imrul Kayes 53 (37); Mahmudullah 2/23 (4 overs) | | Mahmudullah 48 (36); Darren Stevens 1/19 (3 overs) |

Comilla Victorians won by 3 wickets
Sher-e-Bangla National Cricket Stadium, Dhaka
Umpires: Ahsan Raza (Pak) and Ranmore Martinesz (SL)
Player of the match: Alok Kapali (Comilla)

- Comilla Victorians won the toss and elected to field
- Comilla Victorians won the 2015-16 Bangladesh Premier League.

== Statistics ==
=== Most runs ===
| Player | Team | Runs |
|---|---|---|
| Kumar Sangakkara | Dhaka Dynamites | 349 |
| Imrul Kayes | Comilla Victorians | 312 |
| Tamim Iqbal | Chittagong Vikings | 298 |
| Mahmudullah Riyad | Barisal Bulls | 279 |
| Tillakaratne Dilshan | Chittagong Vikings | 260 |

- Source: ESPNcricinfo

=== Most wickets ===
| ! Player | Team | Wickets |
|---|---|---|
| Kevon Cooper | Barisal Bulls | 22 |
| Abu Hider | Comilla Victorians | 21 |
| Thisara Perera | Rangpur Riders | 18 |
| Shakib Al Hasan | Rangpur Riders | 18 |
| Ashar Zaidi | Comilla Victorians | 17 |

- Source: Cricinfo.com

=== Highest team totals ===
The following table lists the three highest team scores during this season.

| Team | Total | Opponent | Ground |
|---|---|---|---|
| Barisal Bulls | 211/3 (20 overs) | Chittagong Vikings | Sher-e-Bangla Cricket Stadium |
| Chittagong Vikings | 187/7 (20 overs) | Rangpur Riders | Sher-e-Bangla Cricket Stadium |
| Chittagong Vikings | 180/5 (20 overs) | Sylhet Super Stars | Sher-e-Bangla Cricket Stadium |
