= List of Comilla Victorians cricketers =

This is presenting a complete list in alphabetical order of cricketers who have played for Comilla Victorians in Twenty20 matches held by the Bangladesh Premier League. The Comilla Victorians franchise was formed ahead of the 2015 BPL edition. Complying with other club lists, details are the player's name followed by his years active as a Comilla Victorians player, current players to the end of the 2015–16 Bangladeshi cricket season.

== A ==
- Abu Haider (2015–16)
- Ahmed Shehzad (Pakistan; 2015–16)
- Alok Kapali (2015–16)
- Ariful Haque (2015–16)
- Ashar Zaidi (Pakistan; 2015–16)
- Ashiqur Zaman (2022–23)
- Faf du plesis(2020–21)

== D ==
- Dhiman Ghosh (2015–16)
- Dolar Mahmud (2015–16)

== I ==
- Imrul Kayes (2015–16)

== K ==
- Kamrul Islam Rabbi (2015–16)
- Nuwan Kulasekara (Sri Lanka; 2015–16)

== L ==
- Liton Das (2015–16)

== M ==
- Mahmudul Hasan (2015–16)
- Mashrafe Mortaza (2015–16)
- Mukhtar Ahmed (Pakistan; 2015–16)
- Mohammad Rizwan (Pakistan 2022–2024)

== N ==
- Naeem Islam (2015–16)
- Sunil Narine (West Indies; 2015–16)

== R ==
- Andre Russell (West Indies; 2015–16)

== S ==
- Marlon Samuels (West Indies; 2015–16)
- Sanjamul Islam (2015–16)
- Krishmar Santokie (West Indies; 2015–16)
- Shoaib Malik (Pakistan; 2015–16)
- Shuvagata Hom (2015–16)
- Darren Stevens (England; 2015–16)
