= Shuvagata Hom =

Bangladeshi National cricketer

Personal information
- Full name: Shuvagata Hom Chowdhury
- Born: 11 November 1986 (age 40); Mymensingh, Bangladesh
- Nickname: Shuvo
- Batting: Right-handed
- Bowling: Right arm off break
- Role: Batting all-rounder

International information
- National side: Bangladesh (2011–2016)
- Test debut (cap 72): 5 September 2014 v West Indies
- Last Test: 28 October 2016 v England
- ODI debut (cap 100): 16 August 2011 v Zimbabwe
- Last ODI: 18 October 2011 v West Indies
- T20I debut (cap 50): 15 January 2016 v Zimbabwe
- Last T20I: 26 March 2016 v New Zealand

Domestic team information
- Years: Team
- 2010–present: Dhaka Division, Central Zone
- 2010: Rajshahi Rangers
- 2012: Sylhet Royals
- 2013: Barisal Burners
- 2015: Comilla Victorians
- 2016: Khulna Titans
- 2017: Sylhet Sixers
- 2019: Dhaka Dynamites
- 2019: Dhaka Platoon
- 2020: Gemcon Khulna
- 2021: Minister Dhaka
- 2023: Chattogram Challengers
- 2024: Chittagong Kings

Career statistics
Competition	Test	ODI	FC	LA
Matches	8	4	135	154
Runs scored	244	70	6,877	2,511
Batting average	22.18	35.0	36.57	20.92
100s/50s	0/1	0/0	17/38	1/12
Top score	50	35*	166*	116
Balls bowled	846	12	17,207	4,792
Wickets	8	0	299	127
Bowling average	63.25	0	28.95	28.82
5 wickets in innings	0	0	8	2
10 wickets in match	0	0	2	0
Best bowling	2/66	0	7/48	5/25
Catches/stumpings	8/0	0/0	130/0	55/0
Medal record
Representing Bangladesh
Men's Cricket
Asian Games
Gold medal – first place	2010 Guangzhou	Team
Bronze medal – third place	2014 Incheon	Team
- Source: ESPNcricinfo, 20 November 2025

Shuvagata Hom Chowdhury (Bengali: শুভগত হোম চৌধুরী; born 11 November 1986) is a Bangladeshi cricketer, a right-handed batsman who represents Mymensingh Division in first-class and list A cricket and Rajshahi Division in Twenty20 matches. He made his One Day International (ODI) debut for Bangladesh in 2011 against Zimbabwe at Harare. He made his Test match debut against the West Indies in September 2014. He made his Twenty20 International debut against Zimbabwe on 15 January 2016.

Born in Mymensingh, Shuvagata is one of the several Bangladesh players to emerge from smaller towns. He is known for his quick scoring ability in the lower order and play aggressive knocks. He now represents Mymensingh Division in First Class Cricket.

Shuvagata played for many years in the minor leagues before a talent scout brought him to play in Dhaka. He represented Dhaka's first division side, Cricket Coaching School and played as a No. 3 batsman. He was instrumental in making sure that his club was promoted to the premier league in Dhaka.

Shuvagata played some fine knocks that brought him into the reckoning for the national squad. He was named in the provisional squad of 30 players for the 2011 World Cup. Shuvagata was selected for the tour of Zimbabwe after the World Cup and has acquitted himself well with some handy contributions. He scored 70 runs in 3 matches against them and played one other game against West Indies before being dropped. Since then he has been sidelined and has been overlooked even after some good performances in first-class cricket.

== Career ==
Shuvagata made his first-class debut on 20 January 2010 in a National League match for Dhaka against Barisal. Dhaka batted once in the match and coming in at number seven Shuvagata scored 52 runs from 82 balls. During a warm-up match against a touring England team in March 2010, Shuvagata scored 91 runs from 30 balls for Bangladesh A from the bowling of Alastair Cook and Michael Carberry as England enticed his team to declare. Shuvagata scored his maiden century in October 2010, during the opening match of the National League against Khulna Division. Shuvagata scored 105 runs from 203 balls as the match ended in a draw. Dhaka were runners-up and Shuvagata played three of his team's nine matches, scoring 318 runs including two centuries.

After the 2011 World Cup, Bangladesh faced Australia in a three-match ODI series. Shuvagata was drafted into the national squad for the first time. He had to wait until Bangladesh's next series, five ODIs against Zimbabwe in August, before he made his debut. It was expected that Shuvagata would be introduced at the number four spot, but instead on debut he batted at number six. Debuting in the third match, he scored 32 runs from 36 balls before he was run out.

The Bangladesh Cricket Board (BCB) founded the six-team Bangladesh Premier League in 2012, a twenty20 tournament to be held in February that year. An auction was held for teams to buy players, and Shuvagata was bought by the Sylhet Royals for $80,000. He scored 55 runs from 6 innings in the competition. In April the BCB awarded Shuvagata with a rookie contract.

In 2016 he was added to Bangladesh's squad for the 2016 ICC World Twenty20 after Taskin Ahmed was suspended from bowling with an illegal action.

Along with Sunzamul Islam, he was the joint-leading wicket-taker in the 2016–17 Bangladesh Cricket League, with a total of 25 dismissals.

In October 2018, he was named in the squad for the Dhaka Dynamites team, following the draft for the 2018–19 Bangladesh Premier League. In February 2019, playing for Shinepukur Cricket Club in the 2018–19 Dhaka Premier Division Twenty20 Cricket League, he scored the fastest fifty by a Bangladeshi batsman in T20 cricket, from just 16 balls. In November 2019, he was selected to play for the Dhaka Platoon in the 2019–20 Bangladesh Premier League.

In April 2021, he was named in the Bangladesh's squad for 2-match test series against Sri Lanka after his consistent all-round performance in first-class cricket, since he last played 5 years ago against England in test in 2016. Minhajul Abedin, the chief selector of Bangladesh national team said, ''Shuvagata is coming back after a while but he has been a consistent performer in first class cricket. We have considered him as a batting all-rounder but his off-break is pretty handy and gives us an option in the spin department."

In Jan 2022, Twin centuries from Shuvagata Hom helped Walton Central Zone lift the trophy of the 2021-22 Bangabandhu Bangladesh Cricket League (BCL). They beat the BCB South Zone by four wickets in a thrilling encounter in the final of the tournament at the Sher-E-Bangla National Cricket Stadium in Mirpur. It was their first BCL title in four years.
