= Muktar Ali =

Bangladeshi cricketer (born 1989)

Personal information
- Born: 10 October 1989 (age 37); Rajshahi, Bangladesh
- Batting: Right-handed
- Bowling: Right-hand fast
- Role: Batting all-rounder

International information
- National side: Bangladesh
- Only T20I (cap 54): 20 January 2016 v Zimbabwe

Domestic team information
- Years: Team
- 2013: Duronto Rajshahi
- 2016: Rangpur Riders
- Source: Cricinfo, 24 August 2020

Muktar Ali (born 10 October 1989) is a Bangladeshi cricketer. In January 2016 he was added to Bangladesh's squad for their Twenty20 International (T20I) series against Zimbabwe. He made his T20I debut against Zimbabwe on 20 January 2016. In November 2019, he was selected to play for the Chattogram Challengers in the 2019–20 Bangladesh Premier League.
