= Jubair Hossain =

Bangladeshi cricketer (born 1995)

Personal information
- Full name: Jubair Hossain Likhon
- Born: 12 September 1995 (age 31); Jamalpur, Bangladesh
- Batting: Right-handed
- Bowling: Leg-break
- Role: Bowler

International information
- National side: Bangladesh (2014–2015)
- Test debut (cap 74): 25 October 2014 v Zimbabwe
- Last Test: 30 July 2015 v South Africa
- ODI debut (cap 114): 28 November 2014 v Zimbabwe
- Last ODI: 10 July 2015 v South Africa
- Only T20I (cap 48): 13 November 2015 v Zimbabwe

Career statistics
Competition	Test	ODI	T20I	FC
Matches	6	3	1	20
Runs scored	13	5	–	33
Batting average	4.33	5.00	–	2.42
100s/50s	0/0	0/0	–	0/0
Top score	7*	5	–	7*
Balls bowled	587	93	24	2,114
Wickets	16	4	2	58
Bowling average	30.81	28.50	10	32.77
5 wickets in innings	1	0	0	1
10 wickets in match	0	0	0	0
Best bowling	5/96	2/41	2/20	5/96
Catches/stumpings	1/–	1/–	0/–	2/–
- Source: ESPNcricinfo, 2 March 2019

Jubair Hossain (born 12 September 1995) is a Bangladeshi cricketer. He made his Test match debut for Bangladesh against Zimbabwe on 25 October 2014. He made his One Day International (ODI) debut on the same tour in the fourth ODI match on 28 November 2014. He made his Twenty20 International debut against Zimbabwe on 13 November 2015.
