= Mohammad Shahid (Bangladeshi cricketer) =

Bangladeshi cricketer (born 1988)

Personal information
- Full name: Mohammed Shahid
- Born: 1 November 1988 (age 38); Narayanganj, Bangladesh
- Batting: Left-handed
- Bowling: Left-arm medium-fast
- Role: Bowler

International information
- National side: Bangladesh
- Test debut (cap 75): 28 April 2015 v Pakistan
- Last Test: 30 July 2015 v South Africa
- Only T20I (cap 52): 20 January 2016 v Zimbabwe

Career statistics
Competition	Test	FC	LA
Matches	5	29	25
Runs scored	57	590	1189
Batting average	11.40	16.38	3.38
100s/50s	0/0	1/2	0/0
Top score	25	102*	10
Balls bowled	630	3871	1189
Wickets	5	65	30
Bowling average	57.60	32.67	29.76
5 wickets in innings	0	1	0
10 wickets in match	0	0	0
Best bowling	2/23	5/57	4/30
Catches/stumpings	0/–	19/–	5/–
- Source: ESPNcricinfo, 27 April 2015

Mohammad Shahid (born 1 November 1988) is a First-class cricketer from Bangladesh. He is a right-handed batsman and right-arm medium-fast bowler.

== Domestic career ==
Shahid made his first-class debut on 17 October 2011 against Rangpur Division.

He was the leading wicket-taker for Legends of Rupganj in the 2017–18 Dhaka Premier Division Cricket League, with 29 dismissals in 16 matches.

In October 2018, he was named in the Comilla Victorians team, following the draft for the 2018–19 Bangladesh Premier League. He was the leading wicket-taker for Legends of Rupganj in the 2018–19 Dhaka Premier Division Cricket League tournament, with 27 dismissals in 15 matches.

== International career ==
In April 2015, Shahid was named in the Bangladesh's Test squad for their series against Pakistan. He made his Test debut against Pakistan in the Sheikh Abu Naser Stadium on 28 April 2015. He made his Twenty20 International debut for Bangladesh against Zimbabwe on 20 January 2016.
