= Fortune Barishal =

Bangladesh Premier League Franchise

- ফরচুন বরিশাল
- League: Bangladesh Premier League

Personnel
- Captain: Tamim Iqbal
- Coach: Mizanur Rahman Babul
- Owner: Fortune Group

Team information
- City: Barishal, Barishal Division, Bangladesh
- Founded: 2012 (as Barishal Burners); 2015 (as Barishal Bulls); 2022 (as Fortune Barishal)
- Home ground: Barisal Divisional Stadium, Barishal

History
- Bangladesh Premier League wins: 2 (2024, 2025)
T20I kit

Fortune Barishal (Bengali: ফরচুন বরিশাল) is a franchise cricket team that plays in the Bangladesh Premier League (BPL), representing the country's Barishal Division.

The team was originally established in 2012 for the inaugural BPL season as the Barisal Burners (Bengali: বরিশাল বার্নার্স, often abbreviated as BB). The Burners were the BPL runners-up in 2012. The Burners were one of the teams dissolved in 2013 after the BPL's second edition.

The franchise was sold to the Axiom Technologies and rebranded as the Bulls for the 2015 edition. Axiom Technologies' chairman was banned for life from cricket and thus Awwal Bhulu was sworn in. The Bulls were coached by Graham Ford and captained by Mahmudullah Riyad in the 2015/16 Bangladesh Premier League. Sri Lanka-born Australian Dav Whatmore and Bangladesh's then Test Captain Mushfiqur Rahim were the head coach and captain respectively for Season 4 (2016/17 Bangladesh Premier League).

The team was excluded from BPL 5 due to financial difficulties. The team returned in BPL 8 - 2021–22 Bangladesh Premier League under the ownership of Fortune Sporting Limited. They won BPL 2024 after beating Comilla Victorians by 6 wickets. Tamim Iqbal and Dav Whatmore were the captain and head coach for Fortune Barishal in season 2024, respectively.

== History ==
In 2012, the Bangladesh Cricket Board (BCB) created the Bangladesh Premier League cricket tournament to be played under Twenty20 rules. For the inaugural tournament held in February of the same year, a list of six teams to participate in the tournament was finalised. The teams representing the administrative divisions of Bangladesh, including Barisal, were put up for auction at the Radisson Hotel in Dhaka on 10 January 2012. Barisal Burners were bought by ALIF SSL Sports Holdings Ltd (a concern of the ALIF Group) for a price of US$1.01 million, which was the lowest price paid for any team at the auction.

== Seasons overview ==
=== 2012 season ===
The biggest buy by the Burners was the West Indies opener Chris Gayle, who was bought for a grand total of $551,000, the second biggest buy of the inaugural BPL, however he was only available for five games. In his short stay he was able to score two centuries and had the highest average of 97.00. The Burners continued with Pakistani opener Ahmed Shehzad and the experienced Australian Brad Hodge opening the batting. Other players in the team included Shahriar Nafees, who was the "icon player", and Mominul Haque, Al Amin, Suhrawadi Shuvo, English wicketkeeper Phil Mustard and Pakistan's Yasir Arafat. The team also included Australian fast bowler Shane Harwood until he was injured. The Burners had a stable batting line-up which was crucial in enabling them to qualify for the semi-finals, especially in a close run chase against Chittagong Kings in the penultimate league match. The Burners defeated the table toppers Duronto Rajshahi in the semi-final but lost the final against Dhaka Gladiators by 8 wickets.

=== 2013 season ===
Barisal had a poor campaign in the 2013 edition of the tournament. They finished in the bottom 3 and thus did not qualify for the playoffs. They finished 6th out of the 7 teams competing to earn a place in the playoffs. Barisal could not retain Chris Gayle as he signed to play for the Dhaka Gladiators. They managed to include Sunil Narine in their squad and retained Phil Mustard and Brad Hodge. They could not keep a consistent win streak which led to their downfall in the 2nd edition of the tournament.

=== 2015 season ===
At the 2015 season of BPL, Barisal Burners was rebranded as Barisal Bulls after the change of owner. The biggest buy that season for them was Chris Gayle who played for Barisal Burners in the 2012 season and Dhaka Gladiators in the 2013 season. He was brought for an approximate $350,000. The other notable players of the team included ex-Zimbabwean national team wicket-keeper Brendan Taylor, Evin Lewis and Kevon Cooper. The Pakistani players Mohammad Sami and Imad Wasim. Bangladeshi players included, all-rounder Mahmudullah Riyad, who was the icon player, Sabbir Rahman, Shahriar Nafees, Sohag Gazi, Al-Amin Hossain and Taijul Islam. The Bulls had a balanced squad with the class of Chris Gayle, Mahmudullah Riyad and Brendan Taylor on the top, and the pace and swing of Mohammad Sami and Al-Amin Hossain with the ball which led the team to qualify for the playoffs. They defeated Dhaka Dynamites by 18 runs in the eliminator and Rangpur Riders by 5 wickets in the 2nd qualifier to reach the finals. They lost in a competitive final to Comilla Victorians by 3 wickets and ended up being the runner-up of that tournament. Some of the notable records by the players of Barisal Bulls include Evin Lewis' 101* Chis Gayle's 92 and Kevon Cooper being named the highest wicket taker of the tournament with 22 wickets.

=== 2016 season ===
The team signed Mushfiqur Rahim as their icon player and captain while the team couldn't sign big names like last season. They signed Dawid Malan, Rumman Raees, Thisara Perera and more from the overseas department while they retained Taijul Islam and Al-Amin Hossain from the local category. They also signed Shahriar Nafees, Abu Hider and more from the draft.

They started off on a sour note as they lost to Dhaka Dynamites but won against Comilla Victorians and Rajshahi Kings (defending first innings total of 192) later on. In the end, finished last in the league stage due to bowling department failure though their icon player put up a great show with the bat as he was one of the highest run getters of the season.

=== 2024 season ===
The Fortune Barishal opened its campaign against Rangpur Riders.The game was played on 20 January which ended in, Fortune Barishal defeating Rangpur Riders by five wickets to win the Opening Match. Star players include veterans Tamim Iqbal, Mahmudullah Riyad and Mushfiqur Rahim. Overseas Players feature David Miller, Ahmed Shehzad, Kyle Mayers, Keshav Maharaj, Ibrahim Zadran, Obed McCoy and Dunith Wellalage.

They ended up their journey of this edition by winning the cup. Kyle Mayers of Fortune Barishal was the man of the final.

Fortune Barishal captain Tamim Iqbal Khan was named player of the tournament. He was also the top run scorer of that BPL Edition.

=== 2025 season ===
Fortune Barishal went on to become the champions of Bangladesh Premier League consecutively in the 11th edition.

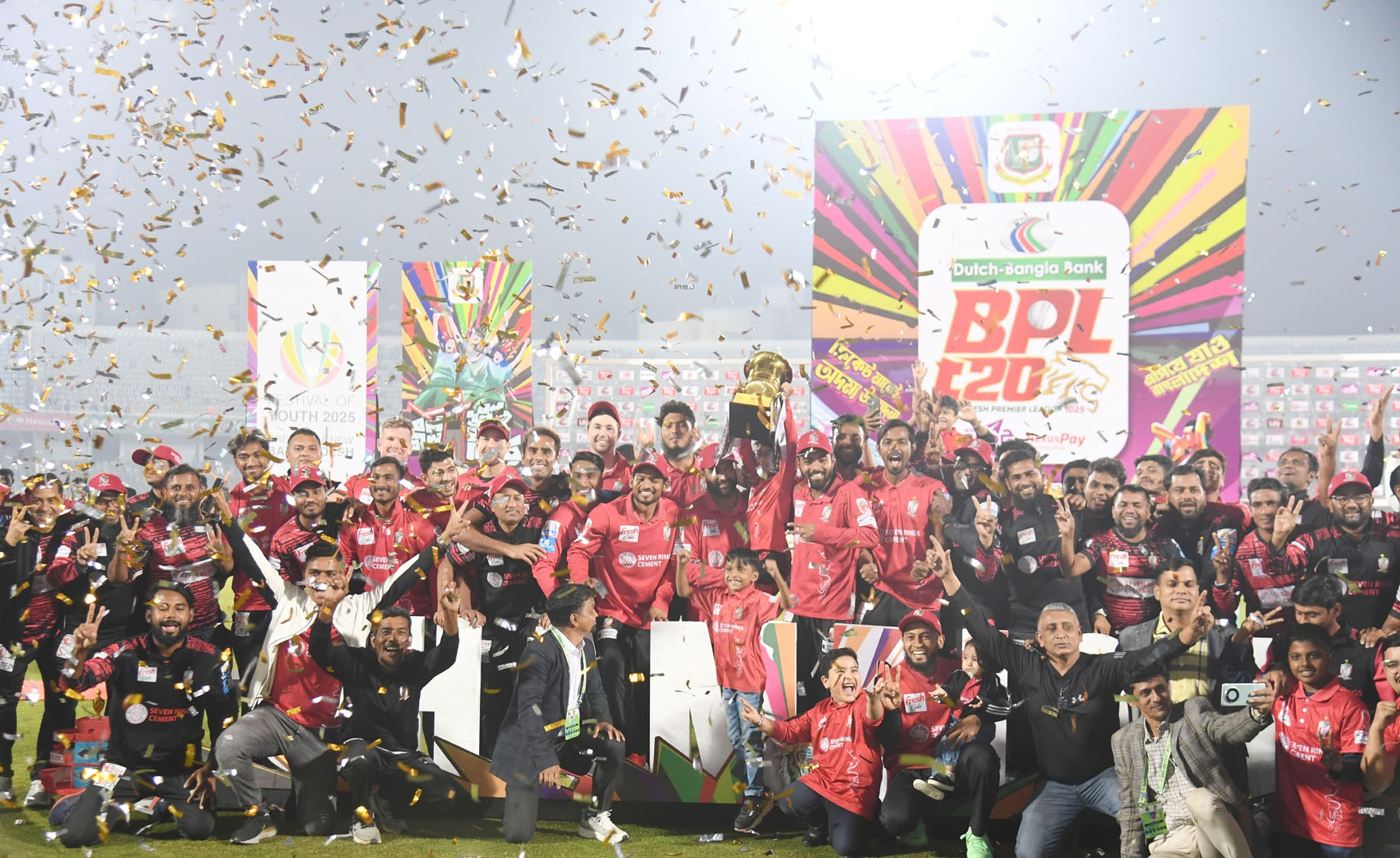
Celebrations after winning the trophy

The squad consisted of notable local players such as Captain Tamim Iqbal, Mahmudullah Riyad, Mushfiqur Rahim, Towhid Hridoy, Rishad Hossain and Nazmul Hossain Shanto. It also consisted of noteworthy overseas stars such as Kyle Mayers, James Fuller, Dawid Malan, Mohammad Nabi, Shaheen Afridi, Faheem Ashraf, Nandre Burger and James Neesham.

== Current squad ==
Name	Nationality	Batting style	Bowling style	Notes
Batters
Tamim Iqbal	Bangladesh	Left-handed	Right-arm off break	Captain
Dawid Malan	England	Left-handed	Right-arm leg-break	Overseas player
Towhid Hridoy	Bangladesh	Right-handed	Right-arm off break	
Nazmul Hossain Shanto	Bangladesh	Left-handed	Right-arm off break	
Pathum Nissanka	Sri Lanka	Right-handed	Right-arm leg-break	Overseas player
Ariful Islam	Bangladesh	Left-handed	Slow left-arm orthodox	
Wicket-keepers
Mushfiqur Rahim	Bangladesh	Right-handed	–	
Pritom Kumar	Bangladesh	Right-handed	–	
All-rounders
Mahmudullah Riad	Bangladesh	Right-handed	Right-arm off break	
Rishad Hossain	Bangladesh	Right-handed	Right-arm leg break	
Mohammad Nabi	Afghanistan	Right-handed	Right-arm off break	Overseas player
James Fuller	England	Right-handed	Right-arm Medium-Fast	Overseas player
Jahandad Khan	Pakistan	Left-handed	Left-arm Medium-Fast	Overseas player
Faheem Ashraf	Pakistan	Left-handed	Right Arm medium-Fast	Overseas player
Kyle Mayers	West Indies	Left-handed	Right-arm medium	Overseas player
Nandre Burger	South Africa	Left-handed	Left-arm fast	Overseas player
Pace bowlers
Ripon Mondol	Bangladesh	Right-handed	Right-arm medium	
Ebadot Hossain	Bangladesh	Right-handed	Right-arm medium	
Shaheen Afridi	Pakistan	Right handed	Left-arm medium	Overseas player
Mohammad Imran	Pakistan	Right handed	Left-arm medium-fast	Overseas player
Shohidul Islam	Bangladesh	Right-handed	Right-arm medium	
Iqbal Hossain Emon	Bangladesh	Right-handed	Right-arm medium	
Mohammad Ali	Pakistan	Right handed	Right-arm medium	Overseas player
Spin bowlers
Tanvir Islam	Bangladesh	Left-handed	Slow left-arm orthodox	
Taijul Islam	Bangladesh	Left-handed	Slow left-arm orthodox	
Nayeem Hasan	Bangladesh	Right-handed	Right-arm off break	

== Seasons ==
=== Bangladesh Premier League ===
Year	League standing	Final standing
2012	4th out of 6	Runners-up
2013	6th out of 7	League stage
2015	2nd out of 6	Runners-up
2016	7th out of 7	League stage
2017	Did not participate	
2019	Did not participate	
2019–20	Did not participate	
2022	1st out of 6	Runners-up
2023	4th out of 7	Playoffs
2024	3rd out of 7	Champion
2025	1st out of 7	Champion

== Coaching staff ==
Position	Name
Head coach	Mizanur Rahman Babul
Assistant coach	Humayun Kabir
Manager	Sabbir Khan
Batting coach	Nafees Iqbal
Fielding coach	Shahin Hossain
