= Ashar Zaidi =

Pakistani first-class cricketer (born 1981)

Personal information
- Full name: Syed Ashar Ahmed Zaidi
- Born: 13 July 1981 (age 45); Karachi, Sindh, Pakistan
- Batting: Left-handed
- Bowling: Slow left-arm orthodox

Domestic team information
- Years: Team
- 1999–2010: Islamabad Cricket Association
- 2013–2015: Sussex
- 2015–2016: Comilla Victorians
- 2016: Islamabad United
- 2016–2018: Essex

Career statistics
Competition	FC	LA	T20
Matches	112	108	67
Runs scored	6,015	2,968	1,065
Batting average	36.23	33.34	24.76
100s/50s	12/29	4/14	0/4
Top score	202	141	59*
Balls bowled	6,023	3,451	870
Wickets	94	77	40
Bowling average	29.81	32.97	26.37
5 wickets in innings	0	0	0
10 wickets in match	0	0	0
Best bowling	4/50	4/39	4/11
Catches/stumpings	84/–	37/–	17/–
- Source: ESPN Cricinfo, 23 August 2018

Syed Ashar Ahmed Zaidi (Urdu: سید اشعر احمد زیدی; born 13 July 1981) is a Pakistani first-class cricketer. Zaidi is a left-handed batsman and left-arm orthodox spin bowler who is considered an all-rounder. He has played first-class cricket for Islamabad in Pakistan and for Sussex and Essex in England and has represented the Pakistan A cricket team at international level. He holds a British passport and as a result can play as a domestic player in England.

In August 2024, he was banned from all cricket for a period of five years by the International Cricket Council, after admitting to breaches of the Emirates Cricket Board's Anti-Corruption Code.

== First-class career ==
Zaidi began his career playing for Islamabad Cricket Association in Pakistan. He appeared 88 times for the team between 1999 and 2010 and made appearances for other teams in Pakistan during the period. During the period between 2010 and 2013, he played club cricket in England for Accrington Cricket Club as well as appearing for Gazi Tank in the Dhaka Premier League in Bangladesh.

Zaidi joined Sussex County Cricket Club on non-contract terms towards the end of the 2013 season making two first-class appearances. Following the season, he signed a two-year contract with the club. During a County Championship match in September 2015, Zaidi was abused by English bowler Craig Overton whilst he was batting. Overton received a two match ban as a result of the incident. Zaidi later called on Overton to apologise for the abuse.

After making 19 first-class appearances for the county, Zaidi was released by Sussex at the end of the 2015 season before signing a one-year contract with Essex in January 2016. He played a total of 65 games for Essex over three seasons, but was released at the end of 2018.

== Franchise and T20 career ==
=== Bangladesh Premier League ===
Zaidi was selected by Comilla Victorians in the draft for the 2015 Bangladesh Premier League. He won the player of the tournament award, taking 17 wickets and scoring 215 runs as Comilla won the tournament. Zaidi's simple approach to both batting and bowling during the tournament was noted, although his performance was generally considered a surprise given his lack of Twenty20 experience prior to the tournament.

== Ban from cricket ==
In August 2024, Ashar Zaidi, who was the batting coach, along with Pune Devils team co-owners Parag Sanghvi and Krishan Kumar Choudhary were handed bans after admitting to various breaches of the Emirates Cricket Board (ECB) Anti-Corruption Code for Participants of the Abu Dhabi T10 cricket league.

The charges all relate to the 2021 Abu Dhabi T10 cricket league, and were brought by the International Cricket Council (ICC) on behalf of the ECB. Ashar Zaidi was provisionally suspended on 19 September 2023, and subsequently banned from all cricket for a period of five years. He will be re-eligible to participate in cricket from 19 September 2027 onwards as the ban has been backdated to the date of suspension.
