= Taskin Ahmed =

Bangladeshi cricketer

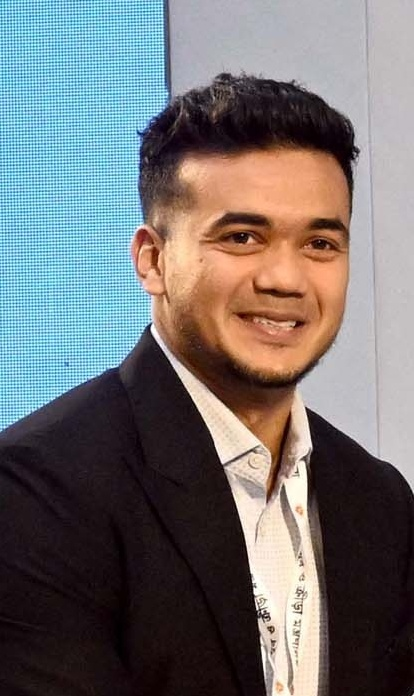
- Ahmed in 2023

Personal information
- Full name: Taskin Ahmed
- Born: 3 April 1995 (age 31); Dhaka, Bangladesh
- Nickname: Tazin
- Height: 6 ft 2 in (188 cm)
- Batting: Left-handed
- Bowling: Right-arm fast
- Role: Bowler

International information
- National side: Bangladesh (2014-present)
- Test debut (cap 83): 12 January 2017 v New Zealand
- Last Test: 16 May 2026 v Pakistan
- ODI debut (cap 112): 17 June 2014 v India
- Last ODI: 11 July 2026 v Zimbabwe
- ODI shirt no.: 3
- T20I debut (cap 43): 1 April 2014 v Australia
- Last T20I: 19 July 2026 v Zimbabwe
- T20I shirt no.: 3

Domestic team information
- Years: Team
- 2011–present: Dhaka Metropolis
- 2012–2013: Chittagong Kings
- 2015–2017: Chittagong Vikings
- 2018: Kandahar Knights
- 2019: Sylhet Sixers
- 2019/20: Rangpur Riders
- 2022: Sylhet Sunrisers
- 2023: Dhaka Dominators
- 2024: Durdanto Dhaka
- 2024/25: Durbar Rajshahi

Career statistics
Competition	Test	ODI	T20I	FC
Matches	19	94	90	42
Runs scored	313	269	229	505
Batting average	11.17	7.07	9.95	11.47
100s/50s	0/1	0/0	0/0	0/1
Top score	75	21	31	75
Balls bowled	3,482	4,455	1,904	6,897
Wickets	55	137	106	127
Bowling average	38.78	28.96	23.24	32.13
5 wickets in innings	1	2	0	3
10 wickets in match	0	0	0	0
Best bowling	6/64	5/28	4/16	6/64
Catches/stumpings	2/–	12/–	13/–	5/–
Medal record
Men's Cricket
Representing Bangladesh
ACC Asia Cup
Runner-up	2016 Bangladesh
Asian Games
Bronze medal – third place	2014 Incheon	Team
- Source: ESPNcricinfo, 31 July 2026

Taskin Ahmed (Bengali: তাসকিন আহমেদ; Arabic: تَسْكِين أحمد; born 3 April 1995) is a Bangladeshi professional cricket right-arm fast bowler. He has represented Bangladesh since 2014 and Dhaka Metropolis since 2011. As of 2026, he is signed to Dhaka Capitals in the Bangladesh Premier League (BPL) and Jaffna Kings in the Lanka Premier League (LPL).

== Early and domestic career ==
Ahmed started his cricket journey in Abahani playground on 10 January 2007. After playing at the under-15 and under-17 levels, he was selected to play for the Bangladesh national under-19 cricket team. He made his first-class debut for Dhaka Metropolis in October 2011 against Barisal Division.

In the 2012 ICC Under-19 World Cup, Ahmed was the highest wicket-taker for Bangladesh, taking 11 wickets. In his second Twenty20 in the BPL 2 for the Chittagong Kings, he was named man of the match for his bowling figures of 4/31 against Duronto Rajshahi in the semi-final. He took 8 wickets in 4 matches, which was the most important turning point of his career.

In BPL 3, Ahmed played for Chittagong Vikings. He became the 4th most searched person of 2015 in Google from Bangladesh.

In October 2018, Ahmed was named in the squad for the Sylhet Sixers team following the draft for the 2018–19 Bangladesh Premier League. He was the leading wicket-taker for the team in the tournament, with twenty-two dismissals in twelve matches. In November 2019, he was selected to play for the Rangpur Rangers in the 2019–20 Bangladesh Premier League.

In November 2021, he was selected to play for the Colombo Stars following the players' draft for the 2021 Lanka Premier League.

On 2 January 2025, he took 7 wickets for Durbar Rajshahi against Dhaka Capitals in the Bangladesh Premier League 2025. His 7 for 19 is the 3rd best spell of all recognized T20 matches. On 20 January, he was named captain of the Durbar Rajshahi. He is the second bowler to reach 100 BPL wickets, after Shakib Al Hasan.

== International career ==
=== Debut (2014-2015) ===
The doors of the national team opened for him suddenly in case of Mashrafe Mortaza's injury. He made his T20I debut on 1 April 2014 and took the wicket of Glenn Maxwell in his T20I debut.

On 17 June 2014, he took 5 wickets against India as the first Bangladeshi ODI debut bowler.

Ahmed was selected for Bangladesh's squad for the 2015 Cricket World Cup for his outstanding performance in domestic cricket in the 2014 season. In the group stage of the World Cup, he took one wicket against Afghanistan, three against Scotland, and two against England, which had a very important role in qualifying for the quarter-final, where Bangladesh faced India in Melbourne, the World Cup quarter-final. Ahmed impressed again by taking three wickets. He was the highest wicket-taker from Bangladesh in the World Cup. The epic celebration between Ahmed and Mortaza after getting wicket called "Chest-bump" was nominated as one of the most memorable moments of the World Cup by cricketcountry.com .

=== 2015-2016 ===
Ahmed had an important role in whitewashing Pakistan in April 2015 and winning against India in June 2015.

=== 2016-2017 ===
In 2016, Ahmed was selected in Bangladesh's squad for the 2016 ICC World Twenty20. However, he was later suspended from bowling in international cricket due to an illegal action bowled during the tournament.

=== 2017-2018 ===
Ahmed made his Test debut for Bangladesh against New Zealand on 12 January 2017 and picked up his maiden Test wicket, dismissing Kane Williamson.

=== 2021-2022 ===
In June 2021, he was named in Bangladesh's squad across all formats for their tour to Zimbabwe. In the only Test match against Zimbabwe, he scored 75 runs and claimed his maiden half-century in Test cricket. He sustained a partnership of 191 runs along with Mahmudullah, which was the second-highest ninth wicket partnership in Test cricket. Ahmed's 75 runs was also the highest individual score at number 10 by a Bangladeshi batsman in an away match.

In September 2021, he was named in Bangladesh's squad for the 2021 ICC Men's T20 World Cup. In the 2022 T20 World Cup, he became the highest wicket taker from Bangladesh by taking 8 wickets in 5 matches.

=== 2023-2024 ===
In March 2023, during the first T20, Ahmed forced the visitors, Ireland, to slow down with his three-wicket burst in the fourth over before claiming another wicket in the final over to finish with 4–16, his career-best figures in T20Is in Bangladesh's T20 series against Ireland. In September 2023, he was picked for Bangladesh's squad for the 2023 Cricket World Cup.

=== 2024-2025 ===
In May 2024, he was named in Bangladesh's squad for the 2024 ICC Men's T20 World Cup.

=== 2025-2026 ===
On 12 January 2025, he was named in Bangladesh's squad for the 2025 ICC Champions Trophy.

== Bowling speed ==
During the 2022 T-20 World Cup, Ahmed bowled a 149.56 km/h delivery to Quinton de Kock, whereas Mashrafe Mortaza, Bangladesh's previous fastest, clocked 148 km/h during a Test against New Zealand at Hamilton in 2001. Ahmed can consistently bowl around 140 kilometres per hour (87 mph).

This record was eventually broken by Nahid Rana, who hit 152 km/h against Pakistan during Bangladesh's 2024 Tour of Pakistan.

== Personal life ==
Ahmed is the son of businessman Abdur Rashid and Sabina Yasmin. Ahmed completed SSC at King Khaled Institute and HSC at Stamford College. He then studied at American International University-Bangladesh (AIUB).

In November 2017, Ahmed married his childhood friend Sayeda Rabeya Nayeem. On 30 September 2018, their first child was born.
