= Sharfuddoula =

Cricket umpire

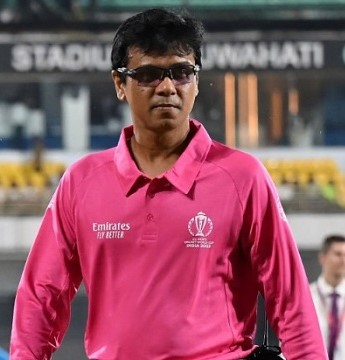
- Sharfuddoula during the Warm-up match between Bangladesh and England in the 2023 ICC Men's Cricket World Cup

Personal information
- Full name: Sharfuddoula Ibne Shahid Saikat
- Born: 16 October 1976 (age 50); Dhaka, Bangladesh
- Height: 5 ft 8 in (1.73 m)
- Batting: Left-handed
- Bowling: Slow left-arm orthodox
- Role: Umpire

Domestic team information
- Years: Team
- 2000–2001: Dhaka Metropolis
- FC debut: 22 November 2000 Dhaka Metropolis v Sylhet Division
- Last FC: 27 January 2001 Dhaka Metropolis v Chittagong Division

Umpiring information
- Tests umpired: 22 (2021–2026)
- ODIs umpired: 72 (2010–2025)
- T20Is umpired: 60 (2011–2026)
- WODIs umpired: 13 (2012–2022)
- WT20Is umpired: 28 (2012–2022)

Career statistics
Competition	FC
Matches	10
Runs scored	44
Batting average	7.33
100s/50s	0/0
Top score	14
Balls bowled	2,122
Wickets	31
Bowling average	23
5 wickets in innings	2
10 wickets in match	0
Best bowling	6/45
Catches/stumpings	4/–
- Source: ESPNcricinfo, 4 July 2026

Sharfuddoula Ibne Shahid Saikat (Bengali: শরফুদ্দৌলা ইবনে শহীদ) (born 16 October 1976), also known as Sharfuddoula Saikat, is an international cricket umpire and a former first-class player from Bangladesh. In March 2024, he became the first Bangladeshi umpire to be included in the Elite Panel of ICC Umpires. He also officiated in 100 matches in men's international cricket including ICC Men's Cricket World Cup in 2023.

== Early life and playing career ==
Saikat was a student of Rajshahi University School. He completed his honours and masters in International relations from Dhaka University and later earned an MBA major in Marketing and in Human resource management from AIUB.

Sharfuddoula was a left-arm spin bowler. He played three matches for Bangladesh at the 1994 ICC Trophy in Kenya. He also played 10 first-class cricket matches for Dhaka Metropolis in 2000 and 2001. His best first-class figures were 6 for 45 against Sylhet Division in December 2000; two weeks later he took 5 for 22 against Khulna Division.

== Umpiring career ==
He made his first-class umpiring debut in February 2007 in a match between Barisal Division and Sylhet Division.

In January 2010, he stood in his first One Day International match between Bangladesh and Sri Lanka, becoming the tenth Bangladeshi to umpire at international level.

He was one of the match officials for the 2018 Cricket World Cup Qualifier in Zimbabwe. He was one of the twelve on-field umpires for the 2018 Women's World Twenty20. In October 2019, he was appointed as one of the twelve umpires to officiate matches in the 2019 T20 World Cup Qualifier in the United Arab Emirates. In January 2020, he was named as one of the sixteen umpires for the 2020 Under-19 Cricket World Cup in South Africa.

In February 2021, he was named as an on-field umpire for both the test matches played between Bangladesh and West Indies, becoming the fifth Bangladeshi umpires to officiate in test matches.

In February 2022, he was named one of the on-field umpires for the 2022 Women's Cricket World Cup in New Zealand. In January 2023, he was named one of the on-field umpires for the 2023 Under-19 Women's T20 World Cup.

In March 2023, during the 3rd T20I between Bangladesh and Ireland, he became the first Bangladeshi umpire to officiate in 100 men's international matches.

In September 2023, he was named as one of the sixteen match officials for 2023 Cricket World Cup, becoming the first Bangladeshi umpire to be named as one of the umpires for the Men's World Cup. He was selected to stand in 5 matches as an on-field umpire in the World Cup including a group stage match between Australia and New Zealand.

In January 2024, he became the second Bangladeshi umpire, after Enamul Haque Moni, to officiate a Test match as a neutral umpire outside Bangladesh, being named as an on-field umpire for the 2nd Test between Australia and West Indies.

On 28 March 2024, following the International Cricket Council's annual review and selection process, he became the first Bangladeshi umpire to be included in the Elite Panel of ICC Umpires. He replaced South African umpire Marais Erasmus who retired from umpiring in international cricket in February 2024.

In May 2024, he was named one of the twenty umpires to officiate matches in the 2024 Men's T20 World Cup.

In December 2024, during the 4th Test of Border–Gavaskar Trophy, one of his decisions as the Third umpire created a controversy when he gave his decision relying on visual evidence instead of going with technological evidence. However, His decision was praised and backed by several cricket experts including Simon Taufel, Ricky Ponting, Ravi Shastri, Michael Vaughan and Rohit Sharma, the captain of Indian cricket team.

In February 2025, he was named one of the match officials for 2025 Champions Trophy.

In January 2026, he was named one of the match officials for 2026 Men's T20 World Cup.

== See also ==
- List of Test cricket umpires
- List of One Day International cricket umpires
- List of Twenty20 International cricket umpires
