= Nasir Hossain =

Bangladeshi cricketer

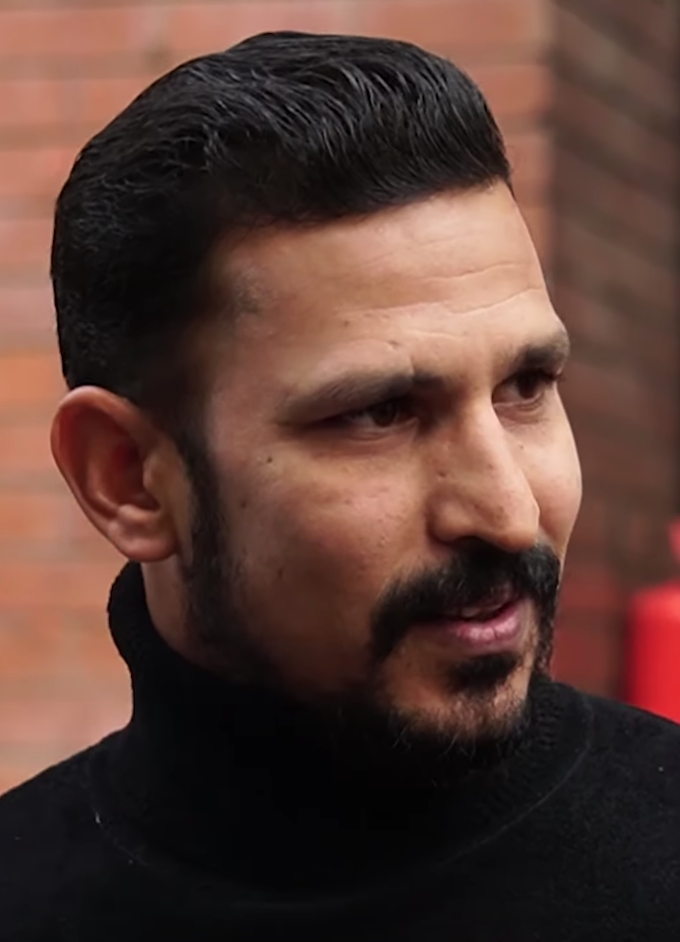

Personal information
- Full name: Mohammad Nasir Hossain
- Born: 30 November 1991 (age 34); Rangpur, Bangladesh
- Height: 5 ft 9 in (1.75 m)
- Batting: Right-handed
- Bowling: Right-arm offbreak
- Role: Allrounder

International information
- National side: Bangladesh
- Test debut (cap 61): 21 October 2011 v West Indies
- Last Test: 4 September 2017 v Australia
- ODI debut (cap 99): 14 August 2011 v Zimbabwe
- Last ODI: 25 January 2018 v Sri Lanka
- ODI shirt no.: 69
- T20I debut (cap 29): 11 October 2011 v West Indies
- Last T20I: 9 March 2016 v Netherlands

Domestic team information
- Years: Team
- 2008/09: Barisal Division
- 2009/10: Chittagong Division
- 2009/10–2010/11: Rajshahi Division
- 2011/12–present: Rangpur Division
- 2012: Khulna Royal Bengals, Nagenahira Nagas
- 2013: Rangpur Riders
- 2015–2016: Dhaka Dynamites
- 2018-19: Sylhet Sixers
- 2019-20: Chattogram Challengers

Career statistics
Competition	Test	ODI	T20I	FC
Matches	19	65	31	110
Runs scored	1,044	1,281	370	6,186
Batting average	34.80	29.11	18.50	37.26
100s/50s	1/6	1/6	0/2	8/34
Top score	100	100	50*	295
Balls bowled	924	1,256	179	7,000
Wickets	8	24	7	97
Bowling average	55.25	41.16	37.42	34.20
5 wickets in innings	0	0	0	1
10 wickets in match	0	0	0	0
Best bowling	3/52	3/26	2/26	5/70
Catches/stumpings	10/–	34/–	15/–	83/–
Medal record
Men's Cricket
Representing Bangladesh
ACC Asia Cup
Runner-up	2012 Bangladesh
Asian Games
Gold medal – first place	2010 Guangzhou	Team
Bronze medal – third place	2014 Incheon	Team
South Asian Games
Gold medal – first place	2010 Dhaka	Team
- Source: Cricinfo, 25 November 2025

Nasir Hossain (Bengali: নাসির হোসেন; born 30 November 1991) is a Bangladeshi cricketer. He represents Rangpur Division at the domestic level. He made his international debut for Bangladesh in August 2011.

== Asian Games ==
Hossain was a part of the 13-man Bangladesh squad that won the cricket tournament tournament at the 2010 Asian Games in late November. The team played Afghanistan in the final and won by five wickets, gaining the country's first gold medal at the Asian Games.

== Domestic career ==
=== Bangladesh Premier League ===
The Bangladesh Cricket Board (BCB) launched the six-team Bangladesh Premier League in 2012, a twenty20 tournament held in February that year. Hossain was bought by the Khulna Royal Bengal for $200,000, the highest price paid for a Bangladeshi player in the auction.

In October 2018, Hossain was named in the squad of the Sylhet Sixers, following the draft for the 2018-19 season.

In November 2019, he was selected to play for the Chattogram Challengers in the 2019-20 season.

=== National Cricket League ===
In December 2017, Hossain scored 295 in the second innings batting for Rangpur Division against Barisal Division in the 2017–18 National Cricket League.

=== T10 League ===
In December 2020, Hossain was picked by Pune Devils for the 2021 T10 League. He was appointed as captain for the team In his debut match, he got the figure of 3/18 in 2 overs and also won the match by 7 wickets.

== International career ==
He made his ODI debut on 14 August 2011 against Zimbabwe at the age of 19. Coming in with Bangladesh's score at 58 for 6, the 19-year-old Hossain top-scored with 63 of 92, lifting the score to 188 which wasn't enough since Zimbabwe won by 7 wickets. In the final game of the five-match series, he accidentally injured Zimbabwe fast bowler Keegan Meth when he drove a delivery straight back to the bowler who was unable to get out of the way, being struck in the mouth and knocking out three teeth.

After losing the ODI series against Zimbabwe 3–2, Bangladesh hosted the West Indies in October for a T20I, three ODIs, and two Tests. In the second ODI, he scored his second half-century. He again came to the wicket with Bangladesh struggling and scored 50 from 54 deliveries. In the final match of the ODI series, which Bangladesh lost 2–1, Hossain took his first wickets in the format. His first was that of left-handed opening batsman Kieran Powell with a delivery that pitched on leg stump and spun to hit the off stump. On a turning pitch Hossain's two wickets for three runs (2/3) helped Bangladesh bowl West Indies out for 61, their second lowest score, and win the match.

Starting in November, Pakistan toured Bangladesh. In the second of three ODIs Hossain scored his maiden international century. He scored 100 runs off 134 balls and was selected Man of the Match for his efforts, though Bangladesh found lost.

In April 2012 the BCB awarded Nasir a central contract for the first time.

He scored his maiden test century against Sri Lanka at Galle on 11 March 2013. He scored 100 off 151 balls with 9 fours. And in the 1st ODI against Sri Lanka he scored at Sooriyawewa, Hambantota on 23 March 2013 he played a magnificent innings of 73 of 59 ball and he was not out. In 3rd ODI The Bangladesh dugout is ecstatic and it has been a brilliant innings under pressure by Nasir Hossain 33(27b).

In 2015, Hossain helped Bangladesh to their most successful run in the 2015 Cricket World Cup. On 12 July, he got his career best 3 for 26 against South Africa to help them win the second ODI and subsequently leading to the series win over the proteas. His catches has been very vital in Bangladesh winning the series against India and South Africa.

In April 2018, Hossain tore his right knee ligament after sustaining an injury while playing football. He needed an operation and as a result he was out of cricket for around six months.

== Personal life ==
Nasir grew up in Bogra, Bangladesh.

On 14 February 2021, Hossain married Tamima Sultana Tammi, an air hostess of Saudia Airlines; later the same year, Tammi's previous husband brought a case against Hossain and Tammi because Tammi had still been married to him at the time of her marriage to Hossain.

== Controversies ==
On 16 January 2023, the International Cricket Council (ICC) banned Nasir Hossain for two years from all forms of cricket, with six months suspended, for breaching the sport's anti-corruption code.
