= Sabbir Rahman =

Bangladeshi cricketer (born 1991)

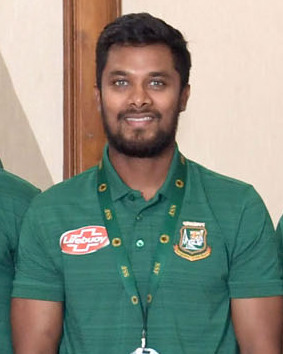
- Sabbir in 2019

Personal information
- Full name: Mohammad Sabbir Rahman Rumman
- Born: 22 November 1991 (age 34); Rajshahi, Bangladesh
- Nickname: Rumon
- Batting: Right-handed
- Bowling: Right-arm leg break
- Role: Top-order batter

International information
- National side: Bangladesh (2014– 2022)
- Test debut (cap 81): 20 October 2016 v England
- Last Test: 8 February 2018 v Sri Lanka
- ODI debut (cap 113): 21 November 2014 v Zimbabwe
- Last ODI: 31 July 2019 v Sri Lanka
- ODI shirt no.: 1
- T20I debut (cap 42): 14 February 2014 v Sri Lanka
- Last T20I: 7 October 2022 v Pakistan
- T20I shirt no.: 1

Domestic team information
- Years: Team
- 2008–present: Rajshahi Division
- 2010: Barisal Division
- 2012: Duronto Rajshahi
- 2013: Barisal Burners
- 2015: Barisal Bulls
- 2016: Rajshahi Kings
- 2017-2019: Sylhet Sixers
- 2018: Peshawar Zalmi
- 2022: Chattogram Challengers
- 2023: Khulna Tigers
- 2024: Harare Bolts
- 2024-2025: Dhaka Capitals

Career statistics
| Competition | Test | ODI | T20I | FC |
|---|---|---|---|---|
| Matches | 11 | 66 | 48 | 80 |
| Runs scored | 481 | 1,333 | 977 | 3,455 |
| Batting average | 24.05 | 25.63 | 23.26 | 28.31 |
| 100s/50s | 0/4 | 1/6 | 0/4 | 4/18 |
| Top score | 66 | 102 | 80 | 165 |
| Balls bowled | 144 | 306 | 73 | 1,285 |
| Wickets | 0 | 3 | 6 | 16 |
| Bowling average | – | 115.00 | 13.17 | 48.50 |
| 5 wickets in innings | – | 0 | 0 | 0 |
| 10 wickets in match | – | 0 | 0 | 0 |
| Best bowling | – | 1/12 | 3/11 | 3/17 |
| Catches/stumpings | 3/– | 37/– | 25/– | 65/– |
Medal record
Men's Cricket
Representing Bangladesh
Asia Cup
| Runner-up | 2016 Bangladesh |
Asian Games
| Gold medal – first place | 2010 Guangzhou | Team |
| Bronze medal – third place | 2014 Incheon | Team |
South Asian Games
| Gold medal – first place | 2010 Dhaka | Team |
- Source: ESPNcricinfo, 15 November 2025

Mohammad Sabbir Rahman (Bengali: মোহাম্মদ সাব্বির রহমান; born 22 November 1991) is a Bangladeshi cricketer. He is from Rajshahi and besides the national team, he plays for Rajshahi Division in domestic cricket. He is a batter who occasionally bowls leg spin. He was the highest run scorer for a Test playing nation in the 2016 Asia Cup and became man of the tournament. He made his international debut in February 2014.

== International career ==
=== One Day International ===
Sabbir made his One Day International (ODI) debut for Bangladesh against Zimbabwe on 21 November 2014.

On 23 February 2019, against New Zealand, Sabbir scored his maiden ODI century which was also his first ever century in international cricket.

=== Asia Cup 2016 ===
Sabbir was the top run scorer for Bangladesh in the 2016 Asia Cup, scoring 176 runs at an average of 44.00 and strike rate of 123.94, and played a major part in the Bangladeshi batting unit and was named the player of the series. He scored a fifty in the match against Sri Lanka, where it was the first time that Bangladesh beat Sri Lanka in a T20I.

=== Test cricket ===
On 20 October 2016, Sabbir made his Test debut against England.

=== 2019 Cricket World Cup ===
In April 2019, Sabbir was named in Bangladesh's 15-man squad for 2019 Cricket World Cup.

== BPL ==
He once held the record for the highest ever individual score in Bangladesh Premier League (BPL) history (122), until the record was bettered by Chris Gayle in the 2017 edition of the BPL.

In October 2018, he was named in the squad for the Sylhet Sixers team, following the draft for the 2018–19 Bangladesh Premier League. In November 2019, he was selected to play for the Cumilla Warriors in the 2019–20 Bangladesh Premier League.

== Controversies ==
On 29 November 2016, Sabbir, along with Al-Amin Hossain, were fined 30% and 50% of their BPL contracts respectively by the Bangladesh Cricket Board (BCB) for "serious off-field disciplinary breaches".

On 1 January 2018, Sabbir was stripped of his central contract, barred from playing international cricket for 6 months, and fined Tk 20 lakh (US$25,000) by the BCB for an incident that happened on 21 December 2017 during Rajshahi Division's first class match against Dhaka Metropolis. During the incident, Sabbir went behind a sight screen and assaulted a young boy who had made a noise towards him during an innings break on the second day of the match. Sabbir was questioned by the match referee on day three, at which point Sabbir got "physically aggressive".

On 28 July, the BCB started investigations after Sabbir allegedly threatened two fans on Facebook following an ODI loss to West Indies. The incident started when one of the fans made a sarcastic comment regarding Sabbir's form on the account of "Shabbir Rahaman Roman", which is believed to be Sabbir's personal Facebook account. Sabbir then responded by allegedly sending messages containing foul language and threats of physical harm. In September 2018, the BCB recommended a six-month suspension from international cricket.

On 16 June 2021, Dhanmondi Sports Club lodged a complaint against Sabbir, who was playing for Legends of Rupganj, for allegedly racially abusing and throwing stones at Elias Sunny, who was playing for Dhanmondi. The alleged incident took place during a T20 match between Dhanmondi and Old DOHS Sports Club during the Dhaka Premier Division T20 League at the Bangladesh Krira Shikkha Protisthan (BKSP) ground 3 in Savar. Sabbir, who had a game against Partex Sporting Club at the BKSP 4 ground later in the day, abused and threw stones at Sunny, who was fielding at the time, while Sabbir was standing outside the boundary. This incident caused the game to be paused for a few minutes. Sunny has alleged that this is not an isolated incident and that this is a continuation of a previous incident where Sabbir had racially abused Sunny while the two were playing against each other in a previous match. The Cricket Committee of Dhaka Metropolis (CCDM) conducted an investigation. Following the investigation, Sabbir and Dhanmondi Club manager Sultan Mahmud were each fined Tk 50,000 (US$590).
