= Arafat Sunny =

Bangladeshi cricketer (born 1986)

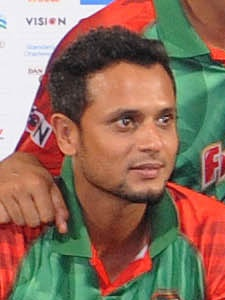
- Sunny in 2015

Personal information
- Full name: Arafat Sunny
- Born: 29 September 1986 (age 40); Dhaka, Dhaka Division, Bangladesh
- Batting: Left-handed
- Bowling: Slow left-arm orthodox
- Role: Bowler

International information
- National side: Bangladesh
- ODI debut (cap 110): 17 February 2014 v Sri Lanka
- Last ODI: 15 November 2015 v Zimbabwe
- ODI shirt no.: 6
- T20I debut (cap 40): 12 February 2014 v Sri Lanka
- Last T20I: 16 March 2016 v Pakistan

Career statistics
Competition	ODI	T20I	FC	LA
Matches	16	10	85	175
Runs scored	48	34	1,435	788
Batting average	12.00	11.33	16.88	16.76
100s/50s	0/0	0/0	0/2	0/2
Top score	15	10	55	51*
Balls bowled	830	186	18,028	8,767
Wickets	24	12	317	254
Bowling average	25.00	19.16	24.61	24.34
5 wickets in innings	0	0	20	5
10 wickets in match	0	0	1	0
Best bowling	4/27	2/17	7/49	6/56
Catches/stumpings	5/–	1/–	37/–	46/–
Medal record
Representing Bangladesh
Men's Cricket
Asian Games
Bronze medal – third place	2014 Incheon	Team
- Source: ESPNcricinfo, 6 April 2025

Arafat Sunny (born 29 September 1986) is a Bangladeshi first-class cricketer. A left-handed batsman and slow left arm orthodox bowler, he made his debut for Dhaka Division in the 2001–02 season. He currently plays first-class cricket for Dhaka Metropolis, and Twenty20 cricket for the Chittagong Kings.

In 2016, he was selected in Bangladesh's squad for the 2016 ICC World Twenty20. However, he was later suspended from bowling in international cricket due to illegal action.

In October 2018, he was named in the squad for the Rajshahi Kings, following the draft for the 2018–19 Bangladesh Premier League. He was the leading wicket-taker for the team in the tournament, with sixteen dismissals in twelve matches. He was also the leading wicket-taker for Dhaka Metropolis in the 2018–19 National Cricket League, with twenty-three dismissals in five matches. In November 2019, he was selected to play for the Rangpur Rangers in the 2019–20 Bangladesh Premier League.

== Legal issues ==
On 22 January 2017, police raided Sunny's home in the Dhakka suburb of Aminbazar after his longtime girlfriend filed a complaint, accusing him of uploading sensitive photos on social media. Sunny could face up to 14 years in jail or a fine of 10 million taka ($126,340). Sunny along with his mother was under investigation arrested after his girlfriend's complaint. The international player has been charged under the Women and Children Repression Prevention Act. A court ordered them to be put in jail on 13 February 2017
