= List of Bangladesh Premier League records and statistics =

This is an overall list of statistics and records in the Bangladesh Premier League, a Twenty20 cricket franchise based tournament which is held annually in Bangladesh.

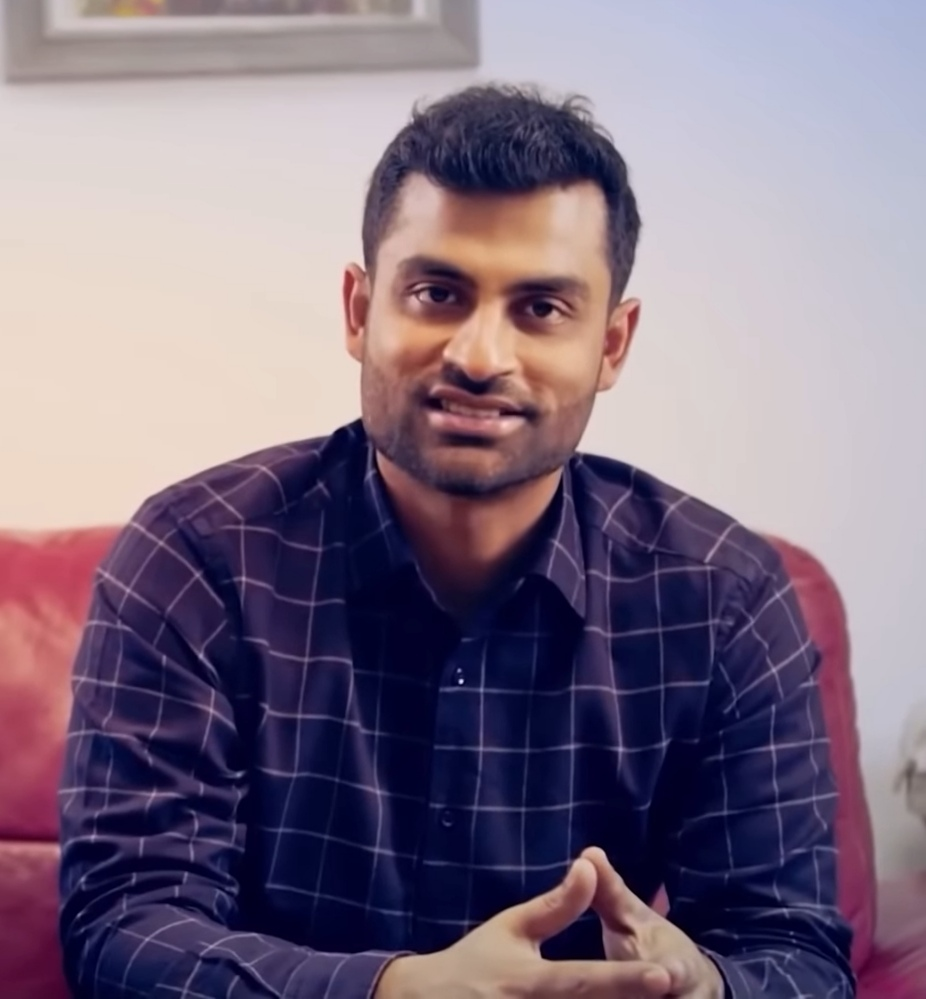
Tamim Iqbal is highest run getter in BPL

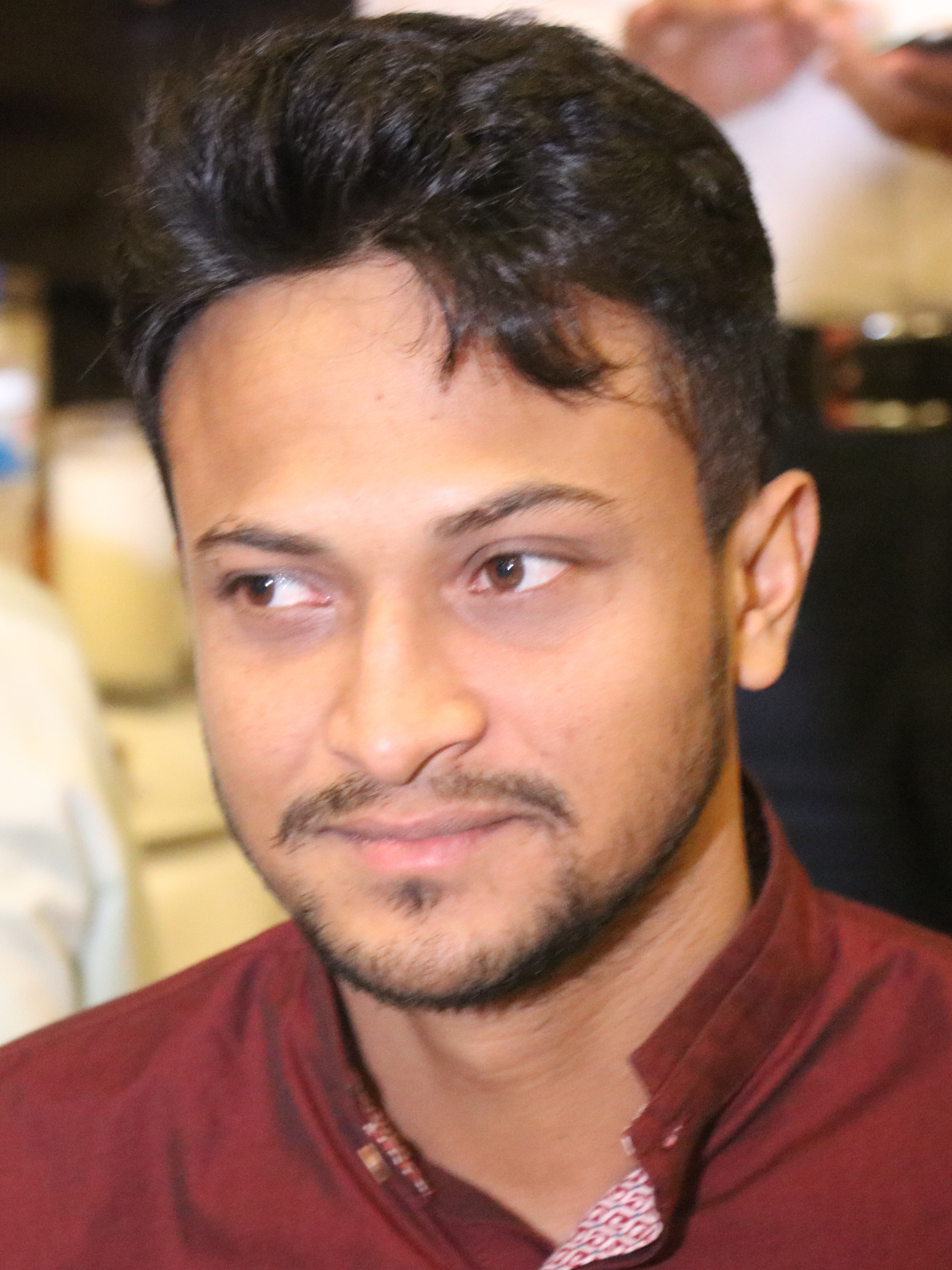
Shakib Al Hasan is the highest wicket taker in BPL

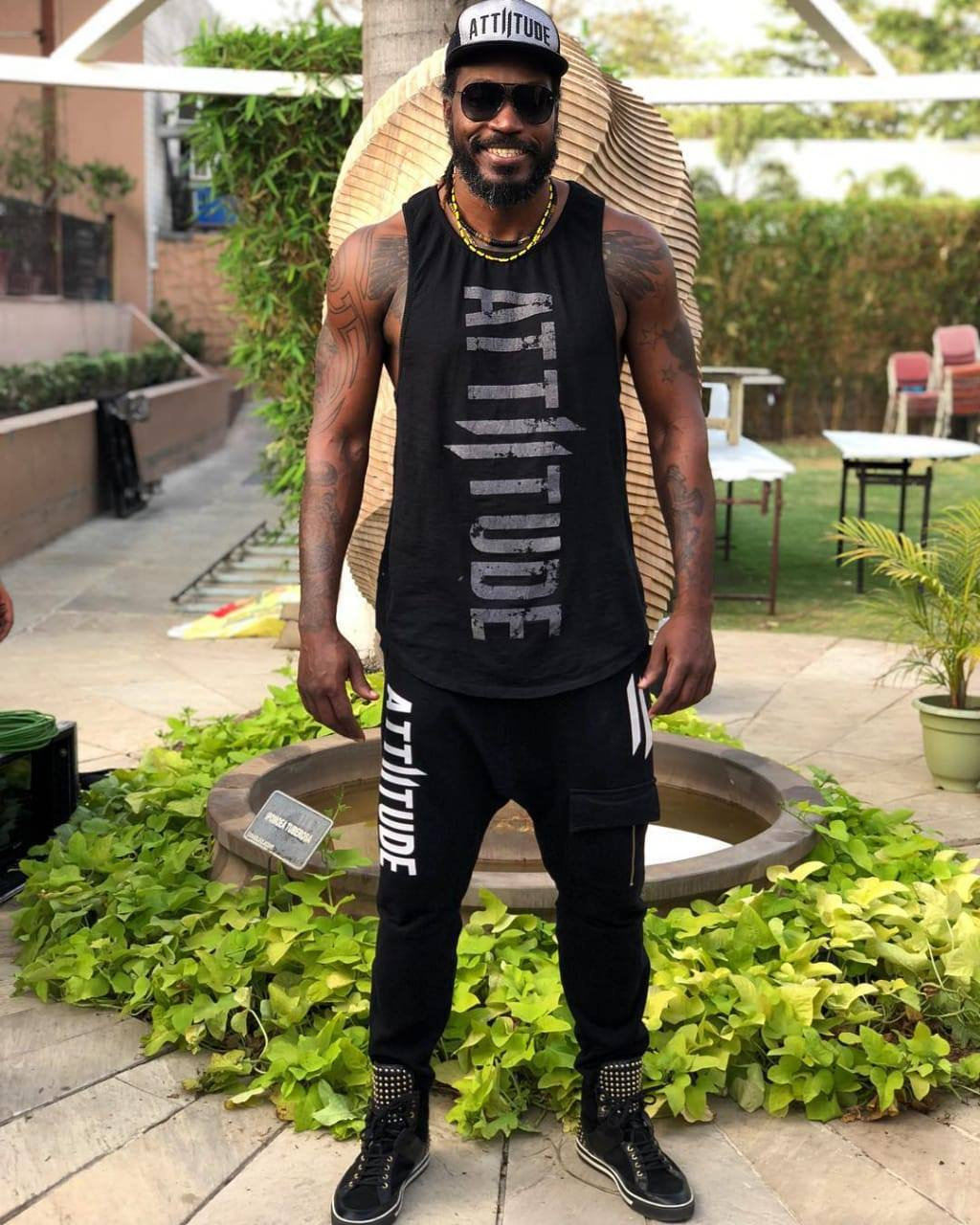
Chris Gayle hit the most number of centuries and the most sixes in BPL

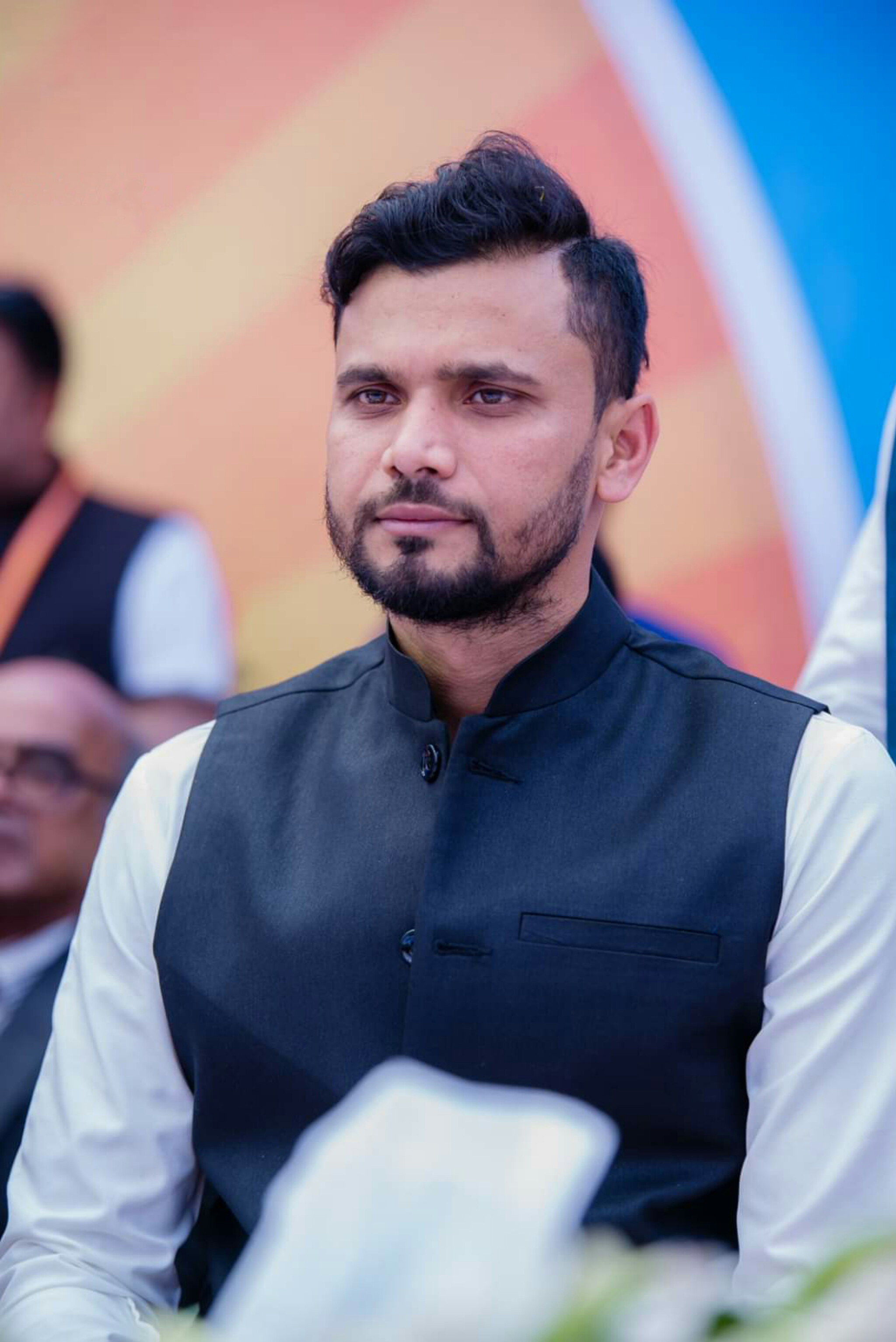
Mashrafe Mortaza is the most successful captain having won 4 BPL titles

== Team records ==
=== Overall Team performance ===
Records include all matches played under every team with different names of the franchise. The team in the table is represented with the current name of the franchise.

Overall team performances
Team	Match	Win	Loss	Tied	Tied+W	Tied+L	NR	Win%
Chattogram Royals	144	68	75	0	1	0	0	47.22%
Comilla Victorians	104	65	38	0	1	0	0	62.50%
Dhaka Capitals	142	68	74	0	0	0	0	47.89%
Fortune Barishal	102	60	42	0	0	0	0	58.82%
Khulna Tigers	125	55	69	0	0	1	0	44.00%
Noakhali Express	5	0	5	0	0	0	0	0.00%
Rajshahi Warriors	94	48	45	1	1	0	0	51.06%
Rangpur Riders	123	70	52	1	0	1	0	56.91%
Sylhet Titans	124	45	78	0	0	1	0	36.29%
Last Updated: 7 January 2026

Note:

- Tie&W and Tie&L indicates matches tied and then won or lost by "Super Over"
- The win percentage excludes no results.

=== Overall team standings ===
Season wise team standings
Season (No. of Teams)	2012 (6)	2013 (7)	2015 (6)	2016 (7)	2017 (7)	2019 (7)	2019-20 (7)	2022 (6)	2023 (7)	2024 (7)	2025 (7)	2025–26 (6)
Chattogram Royals	5th	R	6th	4th	7th	4th	3rd		7th	4th	R	
Comilla Victorians	DNP		C	6th	3rd	C	5th	C		R	DNP	
Dhaka Capitals	C		4th	C	R		4th	5th	6th	7th	6th	5th
Fortune Barishal	R	5th	R	7th	DNP			R	4th	C		DNP
Khulna Tigers	4th	7th	DNP	3rd	4th	7th	R	4th	5th		3rd	DNP
Noakhali Express	DNP											6th
Rajshahi Warriors	3rd	4th	DNP	R	6th	5th	C	DNP			5th	C
Rangpur Riders	DNP	5th	3rd	5th	C	3rd	6th	DNP	3rd		4th	
Sylhet Titans	6th	3rd	5th	DNP	5th	6th	7th	6th	R	6th	7th	3rd

=== Highest total overall ===
Team	Total	Ovs	Opponent	Date	Venue	Season
Dhaka Capitals	254/1	20	Durbar Rajshahi	12 January 2025	Sylhet International Cricket Stadium	2025
Rangpur Riders	239/4	20	Chittagong Vikings	25 January 2019	Zohur Ahmed Chowdhury Stadium	2019
Comilla Victorians	239/3	20	Chattogram Challengers	13 February 2024	Zohur Ahmed Chowdhury Stadium	2024
Chattogram Challengers	238/4	20	Cumilla Warriors	20 December 2019	Zohur Ahmed Chowdhury Stadium	2019–20
Fortune Barishal	238/4	20	Rangpur Riders	19 January 2023	Zohur Ahmed Chowdhury Stadium	2023
Last updated: 7 January 2026; see full table on ESPNCricinfo

=== Lowest total overall ===
Team	Total	Ovs	Opponent	Date	Venue	Season
Khulna Titans	44	10.4	Rangpur Riders	10 November 2016	Sher-e-Bangla National Cricket Stadium	2016
Barisal Bulls	58	16	Sylhet Super Stars	6 December 2015	Sher-e-Bangla National Cricket Stadium	2015
Sylhet Super Stars	59	11.5	Rangpur Riders	7 December 2015	Sher-e-Bangla National Cricket Stadium	2015
Noakhali Express	61	14.2	Sylhet Titans	5 January 2026	Sylhet International Cricket Stadium	2025–26
Comilla Victorians	63	16.2	Rangpur Riders	8 January 2019	Sher-e-Bangla National Cricket Stadium	2019
Last updated: 7 January 2026; see full table on ESPNCricinfo

=== Highest successful run chases ===
Team	Total	Ovs	Target	Opponent	Venue	Season
Comilla Victorians	213/3	18.2	211	Khulna Tigers	Sylhet International Cricket Stadium	2022–23
Rangpur Riders	210/2	19	206	Sylhet Strikers	Sylhet International Cricket Stadium	2025
Khulna Tigers	207/2	18.1	205	Dhaka Platoon	Sher-e-Bangla National Cricket Stadium	2019–20
Rangpur Riders	202/7	20	198	Fortune Barishal	Sylhet International Cricket Stadium	2025
Fortune Barishal	200/6	18.1	198	Durbar Rajshahi	Sher-e-Bangla National Cricket Stadium	2025
Last updated: 7 January 2026

=== Largest victories ===
==== Largest Victories (by runs) ====
Team	Margin	Target	Opponent	Venue	Date	Season
Dhaka Capitals	149	255	Durbar Rajshahi	Sylhet International Cricket Stadium	12 January 2025	2025
Chittagong Kings	119	194	Sylhet Royals	Sher-e-Bangla National Cricket Stadium	8 February 2013	2013
Chittagong Kings	111	192	Durbar Rajshahi	Zohur Ahmed Chowdhury Stadium	20 January 2025	2025
Dhaka Dynamites	105	193	Khulna Titans	Sher-e-Bangla National Cricket Stadium	8 January 2019	2019
Cumilla Warriors	105	174	Rangpur Rangers	Sher-e-Bangla National Cricket Stadium	11 December 2019	2019–20
Chittagong Kings	105	220	Durbar Rajshahi	Sher-e-Bangla National Cricket Stadium	3 January 2025	2025
Last updated: 9 February 2025; see full table on ESPNCricinfo

==== Largest Victories (by wickets) ====
Winner	Margin	Balls	Target	Overs	Opposition	Ground	Date	Season
Barisal Burners	10 wickets	41	166	13.1	Sylhet Royals	Sher-e-Bangla National Cricket Stadium	10 February 2012	2012
Chittagong Vikings	10 wickets	23	140	16.1	Sylhet Super Stars	Zohur Ahmed Chowdhury Stadium	2 December 2015	2015
Khulna Tigers	10 wickets	32	131	14.4	Durdanto Dhaka	Sylhet International Cricket Stadium	29 January 2024	2024
Chattogram Royals	10 wickets	44	123	12.4	Dhaka Capitals	Sylhet International Cricket Stadium	2 January 2026	2025–26
Sylhet Sixers	10 wickets	53	68	11.1	Chittagong Vikings	Sher-e-Bangla National Cricket Stadium	3 December 2017	2017
Last updated: 7 January 2026; see full table on ESPNCricinfo

=== Smallest victories ===
==== Smallest victories (by runs) ====
Team	Margin	Target	Opponent	Venue	Date	Season
Chittagong Vikings	1 run	181	Sylhet Super Stars	Sher-e-Bangla National Cricket Stadium	23 November 2015	2015
Barisal Bulls	1 run	109	Sylhet Super Stars	Sher-e-Bangla National Cricket Stadium	24 November 2015	2015
Comilla Victorians	1 run	128	Dhaka Dynamites	Sher-e-Bangla National Cricket Stadium	1 February 2019	2019
Comilla Victorians	1 run	152	Fortune Barishal	Sher-e-Bangla National Cricket Stadium	18 February 2022	2022
Khulna Royal Bengals	2 runs	172	Sylhet Royals	Zohur Ahmed Chowdhury Stadium	18 February 2012	2012
Last updated: 7 January 2026; See full list on ESPNcricinfo

==== Smallest Victories (by wickets) ====
Winner	Margin	Balls	Target	Overs	Opposition	Ground	Season	Ref
Sylhet Titans	1 wicket	0	144	20	Noakhali Express	Sylhet International Cricket Stadium	27 December 2025	2025–26
Sylhet Royals	1 wicket	2	145	19.4	Barisal Burners	Sher-e-Bangla National Cricket Stadium	13 February 2013	2013
Rangpur Riders	1 wicket	3	152	19.3	Fortune Barishal	Zohur Ahmed Chowdhury Stadium	19 February 2024	2024
Rangpur Riders	2 wickets	0	188	20	Chittagong Vikings	Sher-e-Bangla National Cricket Stadium	22 November 2015	2015
Barisal Bulls	2 wickets	2	137	19.4	Dhaka Dynamites	Sher-e-Bangla National Cricket Stadium	10 December 2015	2015
Khulna Titans	2 wickets	4	167	19.2	Rajshahi Kings	Sher-e-Bangla National Cricket Stadium	21 November 2017	2017
Last updated: 7 January 2026; see full list on ESPNCricinfo

== Batting records ==
=== Most runs ===
Batsman	Mat	Runs	HS	Avg	100s	50s	Span
Tamim Iqbal Khan	118	3835	141*	37.59	2	32	2012—present
Mushfiqur Rahim	141	3497	98*	36.42	0	22	2012—present
Anamul Haque	131	2776	100*	24.56	1	14	2012—present
Mahmudullah	133	2726	73	27.53	0	14	2012—present
Litton Das	106	2443	125*	24.92	1	14	2013—present
see full list on Cricinfo

=== Most runs in a season ===
Batsman	Team	Mat	Runs	HS	Avg	100s	50s	Season
Rilee Rossouw	Rangpur Riders	14	558	100*	69.75	1	5	2019
Najmul Hossain Shanto	Sylhet Strikers	15	516	89*	39.69	0	4	2022–23
Mohammad Naim	Khulna Tigers	14	511	111*	42.58	1	3	2025
Rilee Rossouw	Khulna Tigers	14	495	70*	45.00	0	4	2019–20
Tamim Iqbal	Fortune Barishal	15	492	71	35.14	0	3	2024
see full table on ESPNCricinfo

=== Highest individual score ===
Batsman	Team	Runs	Balls	4s	6s	Opponent	Venue	Season
Chris Gayle	Rangpur Riders	146*	69	5	18	Dhaka Dynamites	Sher-e-Bangla National Cricket Stadium	2017
Tamim Iqbal	Comilla Victorians	141*	61	10	11	Dhaka Dynamites	Sher-e-Bangla National Cricket Stadium	2019
Chris Gayle	Rangpur Riders	126*	51	6	14	Khulna Titans	Sher-e-Bangla National Cricket Stadium	2017
Litton Das	Dhaka Capitals	125*	55	10	9	Durbar Rajshahi	Sylhet International Cricket Stadium	2025
Usman Khan	Chittagong Kings	123	62	13	6	Durbar Rajshahi	Sher-e-Bangla National Cricket Stadium	2025
see full table on ESPNcricinfo

=== Most sixes ===
Batsman	Matches	Runs	Sixes	Span
Chris Gayle	52	1723	143	2012–22
Tamim Iqbal	118	3835	122	2012–present
Mahmudullah	133	2726	106	2012–present
Mushfiqur Rahim	140	3446	106	2012–present
Anamul Haque	131	2776	105	2012–present
see full table on ESPNcricinfo

=== Most sixes in an innings ===
Batsman	Sixs	Runs	BF	S/R	Season
Chris Gayle	18	146	69	211.59	2017
Chris Gayle	14	126	51	247.05	2017
Chris Gayle	12	114	51	223.52	2013
Chris Gayle	11	116	61	190.16	2012
Tamim Iqbal	11	141	61	231.14	2019
see full table on ESPNcricinfo

=== Best strike rates ===
Batsman	Matches	Runs	BF	S/R	Span
Andre Russell	60	970	582	166.66	2012–present
Thisara Perera	88	1230	804	152.98	2015–present
Rilee Rossouw	37	1240	833	148.85	2017–present
Evin Lewis	41	1152	774	148.83	2015–present
Chris Gayle	52	1723	1161	148.40	2012–2022
Minimum 500 balls, see full table on ESPNcricinfo

== Partnership records ==
=== Highest partnership by wickets ===
Wkt	Runs	Partners	Team	Opposition	Ground	Season
1st	241	Tanzid Hasan & Litton Das	Dhaka Capitals	Durbar Rajshahi	Sylhet International Cricket Stadium	2025
2nd	201*	Chris Gayle & Brendon McCullum	Rangpur Riders	Dhaka Dynamites	Sher-e-Bangla National Cricket Stadium	2017
3rd	184*	Alex Hales & AB de Villiers	Rangpur Riders	Dhaka Dynamites	Zohur Ahmed Chowdhury Stadium	2019
4th	153	Mominul Haque & Mahedi Hasan	Dhaka Platoon	Khulna Tigers	Sher-e-Bangla National Cricket Stadium	2022
5th	192*	Shakib Al Hasan & Iftikhar Ahmed	Fortune Barishal	Rangpur Riders	Zohur Ahmed Chowdhury Stadium	2023
6th	98*	Mohammad Saifuddin & Thisara Perera	Comilla Victorians	Chittagong Vikings	Sher-e-Bangla National Cricket Stadium	2019
7th	112*	Thisara Perera & Chaturanga de Silva	Dhaka Capitals	Khulna Tigers	Sher-e-Bangla National Cricket Stadium	2025
8th	85*	Mehidy Hasan & Farhad Reza	Rajshahi Kings	Rangpur Riders	Sher-e-Bangla National Cricket Stadium	2016
9th	43*	Rayad Emrit & Nikhil Dutta	Barisal Bulls	Dhaka Dynamites	Sher-e-Bangla National Cricket Stadium	2015
10th	48*	Abul Hasan & Taijul Islam	Sylhet Sixers	Dhaka Dynamites	Sher-e-Bangla National Cricket Stadium	2017
See full table on ESPNCricinfo

=== Highest partnership by runs ===
Partners	Runs	Wkt	Team	Opponent	Ground	Season
Tanzid Hasan & Litton Das	241	1st	Dhaka Capitals	Durbar Rajshahi	Sylhet International Cricket Stadium	2025
Chris Gayle & Brendon McCullum	201*	2nd	Rangpur Riders	Dhaka Dynamites	Sher-e-Bangla National Cricket Stadium	2017
Lou Vincent & Shahriar Nafees	197*	1st	Khulna Royal Bengals	Duronto Rajshahi	Sheikh Abu Naser Stadium	2013
Shakib Al Hasan & Iftikhar Ahmed	192*	5th	Fortune Barishal	Rangpur Riders	Zohur Ahmed Chowdhury Stadium	2023
Saif Hassan & Alex Hales	186	2nd	Rangpur Riders	Sylhet Strikers	Sylhet International Cricket Stadium	2025
See full table on ESPNCricinfo

== Bowling records ==
=== Most wickets ===
Bowlers	Mat	Ovs	Mdns	Wkts	BBI	Avgs.	Econ.	4WI	5WI	Span
Shakib Al Hasan	113	418.5	11	149	5/16	18.26	6.49	3	1	2012–present
Taskin Ahmed	90	316.3	1	127	7/19	19.93	8.00	5	2	2013–present
Rubel Hossain	89	298.3	1	110	4/23	21.78	8.02	4	0	2012–present
Mustafizur Rahman	82	294.2	6	105	5/27	20.01	7.14	0	1	2015–present
Mashrafe Mortaza	110	362.2	4	98	4/11	25.95	7.02	1	0	2012–present
see full table on ESPNcricinfo

=== Most wickets in a season ===
Bowlers	Team	Mat	Ovs	Mdns	Wkts	BBI	Avgs.	Econ.	4WI	5WI	Season
Shoriful Islam	Chattogram Royals	12	44.5	1	26	5/9	10.07	5.84	0	1	2026
Taskin Ahmed	Durbar Rajshahi	12	46.2	0	25	7/19	12.04	6.49	0	1	2025
Shakib Al Hasan	Dhaka Dynamites	15	56.0	2	23	4/16	17.65	7.25	1	0	2019
Kevon Cooper	Barisal Bulls	9	35.0	1	22	5/15	9.31	5.85	1	1	2016
Shakib Al Hasan	Dhaka Dynamites	13	44.5	3	22	5/16	13.22	6.49	1	1	2017
Taskin Ahmed	Sylhet Sixers	12	37.1	0	22	4/28	14.45	8.55	2	0	2019
Shoriful Islam	Durdanto Dhaka	12	44.4	0	22	4/24	15.86	7.81	1	0	2024
Mashrafe Mortaza	Rangpur Riders	14	55.0	1	22	4/11	17.59	7.03	1	0	2019
Rubel Hossain	Dhaka Dynamites	15	52.4	1	22	4/23	18.50	7.72	2	0	2019
see full list on ESPNcricinfo

=== Best bowling figures in an innings ===
Bowlers	Team	Runs/Wkts	Ovs	Econ.	Opponent	Venue	Season
Taskin Ahmed	Durbar Rajshahi	19/7	4	4.75	Dhaka Capitals	Sher-e-Bangla National Cricket Stadium	2024–25
Mohammad Amir	Khulna Tigers	17/6	4	4.50	Rajshahi Royals	Sher-e-Bangla National Cricket Stadium	2019–20
Mohammad Sami	Duronto Rajshahi	6/5	3.2	1.80	Dhaka Gladiators	Sher-e-Bangla National Cricket Stadium	2012
Nasum Ahmed	Sylhet Titans	7/5	4	1.75	Noakhali Express	Sylhet International Cricket Stadium	2025–26
Wahab Riaz	Dhaka Platoon	8/5	3.4	2.18	Rajshahi Royals	Sher-e-Bangla National Cricket Stadium	2019–20
see full table on ESPNcricinfo

=== Best economy rate ===
Bowlers	Mat	Ovs	Mdns	Avg	Econ.	Wkts	Season
Rashid Khan	15	60	1	16.78	5.31	19	2016–present
Mujeeb Ur Rahman	22	86	4	18.40	5.34	25	2017–present
Sunil Narine	48	183.5	4	23.45	5.61	44	2015–present
Mohammad Sami	40	151.1	4	21.59	6.28	44	2012–2017
Kevon Cooper	38	139.3	2	14.01	6.32	63	2012–2017
Players have played more than 10 matches, is capped (as for foreign player) and took more than 15 wickets.
see full list on ESPNCricinfo

=== Best average ===
Bowlers	Mat	Ovs	Wkts	Avgs.	Econ	Season
Kevon Cooper	38	139.3	63	14.01	6.32	2012–2017
Alfonso Thomas	12	43.5	20	14.90	6.79	2013–present
Wahab Riaz	25	87.5	40	15.35	6.99	2015–present
Mohammad Amir	25	94.1	38	16.02	6.46	2015–present
Rashid Khan	15	60	19	16.78	5.31	2016–present
see full table on ESPNCricinfo

=== Best strike rate ===
Bowlers	Mat	Ovs	Wkts	S/R	Econ	Season
Alfonso Thomas	12	43.5	20	13.1	6.79	2013
Wahab Riaz	25	87.5	40	13.1	6.99	2015–present
Kevon Cooper	38	139.3	63	13.2	6.32	2012–2017
Robert Frylinck	22	79	32	14.8	7.46	2017–present
Dwayne Bravo	42	154.5	62	14.9	8.07	2012–present
see full list on

=== Most runs conceded in an innings ===
Bowlers	Team	Figures O-M-R-W	Econ.	Opponent	Venue	Season
Musfik Hasan	Comilla Victorians	4–0–72–0	18.00	Rangpur Riders	Sher-e-Bangla National Cricket Stadium	2024
Al-Amin Hossain	Chattogram Challengers	4–0–69–0	17.25	Comilla Victorians	Zohur Ahmed Chowdhury Stadium	2024
Lahiru Samarakoon	Durbar Rajshahi	4–0–64–0	16.00	Fortune Barishal	Sher-e-Bangla National Cricket Stadium	2025
Shafiul Islam	Durbar Rajshahi	4–0–62–1	15.50	Dhaka Capitals	Sylhet International Cricket Stadium	2025
Nasir Hossain	Chattogram Challengers	4–0–60–2	15.00	Dhaka Platoon	Zohur Ahmed Chowdhury Stadium	2019–20
see full table on ESPNCricinfo

=== Hat-tricks ===
Symbols	Key
†	Player was selected as Man of the match
↑	debut BPL match of the player

List of hat-tricks in BPL
No.	Bowler	For	Against	Wickets	Venue	Date	Ref.
1	Mohammad Sami	Duronto Rajshahi	Dhaka Gladiators	Darren Stevens (b); Aftab Ahmed (b); Naved-ul-Hasan (b)	Sher-e-Bangla National Stadium, Dhaka	16 February 2012	
2	Al-Amin Hossain †	Barisal Bulls	Sylhet Super Stars	Ravi Bopara (c Taylor); Nurul Hasan (b); Mushfiqur Rahim (b)	Sher-e-Bangla National Stadium, Dhaka	24 November 2015	
3	Aliss Islam ↑†	Dhaka Dynamites	Rangpur Riders	Mohammad Mithun (b); Mashrafe Mortaza (b); Farhad Reza (c Shakib)	Sher-e-Bangla National Stadium, Dhaka	11 January 2019	
4	Wahab Riaz	Comilla Victorians	Khulna Titans	David Wiese (c Saifuddin); Taijul Islam (b); Mohammad Saddam (c Tamim)	Zohur Ahmed Chowdhury Stadium, Chittagong	28 January 2019	
5	Andre Russell	Dhaka Dynamites	Chittagong Vikings	Mushfiqur Rahim (c Hom); Cameron Delport (c Hom); Dasun Shanaka (c Mizanur)	Zohur Ahmed Chowdhury Stadium, Chittagong	30 January 2019	
6	Mrittunjoy Chowdhury (1/2) ↑	Chattogram Challengers	Sylhet Sunrisers	Anamul Haque (c Nasum); Mosaddek Hossain (c Afif); Ravi Bopara (b)	Zohur Ahmed Chowdhury Stadium, Chittagong	29 January 2022	
7	Shoriful Islam	Durdanto Dhaka	Comilla Victorians	Khushdil Shah (c Taskin); Roston Chase (c M Naim); Mahidul Islam Ankon (c I Sukkur)	Sher-e-Bangla National Stadium, Dhaka	19 January 2024	
8	Moeen Ali	Comilla Victorians	Chattogram Challengers	Shohidul Islam (st Ankon); Al-Amin Hossain (c W Jacks); Bilal Khan (b)	Zohur Ahmed Chowdhury Stadium, Chittagong	13 February 2024	
9	Mehedi Hasan Rana	Noakhali Express	Sylhet Titans	Mehidy Hasan Miraz (c Jaker); Nasum Ahmed (lbw); Khaled Ahmed (c Eisakhil)	Sylhet International Cricket Stadium, Sylhet	27 December 2025	
10	Mrittunjoy Chowdhury (2/2)	Rangpur Riders	Noakhali Express	Mahidul Islam Ankon (c Nurul); Zahir Khan (c&b); Bilal Sami (c Litton)	Sylhet International Cricket Stadium, Sylhet	9 January 2026	
11	Ripon Mondol	Rajshahi Warriors	Dhaka Capitals	Sabbir Rahman (c T Tamim); Ziaur Rahman (c Neesham); Taijul Islam (b)	Sylhet International Cricket Stadium, Sylhet	12 January 2026	

== Wicket-keeping records ==
=== Most dismissals ===
Wicket-keeper	Inngs	Dis (Ct+St)	Dis/Inngs	Season
Nurul Hasan	105	112 (76+36)	1.066	2013–present
Mushfiqur Rahim	123	99 (85+14)	0.804	2012–present
Litton Das	76	64 (42+22)	0.842	2013–present
Anamul Haque	105	64 (48+16)	0.609	2012–present
Mohammad Mithun	102	57 (41+16)	0.558	2012–present
see full table on ESPNCricinfo

=== Most dismissals in a season ===
Wicket-keeper	Team	Inngs	Dis (Ct+St)	Max Dis/Inngs	Dis/Inngs	Season
Nurul Hasan	Dhaka Dynamites	15	19 (15+4)	3 (3ct+0st)	1.266	2019
Nurul Hasan	Fortune Barishal	10	18 (12+6)	4 (3ct+1st)	1.800	2022
Kumar Sangakkara	Dhaka Dynamites	13	18 (13+5)	4 (2ct+2st)	1.384	2016
Mushfiqur Rahim	Fortune Barishal	15	18 (17+2)	4 (4ct+0st)	1.200	2024
Litton Das	Comilla Victorians	11	17 (12+5)	3 (3ct+0st)	1.545	2016
see full table on ESPNCricinfo

=== Most dismissals in an innings ===
Wicket-keeper	Team	Dis (Ct+St)	Opponent	Venue	Season
Mohammad Shahzad	Rangpur Riders	5 (2+3)	Barisal Bulls	Zohur Ahmed Chowdhury Stadium	2016
Umar Akmal	Rajshahi Kings	5 (2+3)	Rangpur Riders	Sher-e-Bangla National Cricket Stadium	2016
Mushfiqur Rahim	Sylhet Royals	4 (3+1)	Rangpur Riders	Zohur Ahmed Chowdhury Stadium	2013
Anamul Haque	Dhaka Gladiators	4 (2+2)	Rangpur Riders	Sher-e-Bangla National Cricket Stadium	2013
Brendan Taylor	Chittagong Kings	4 (2+2)	Sylhet Royals	Sher-e-Bangla National Cricket Stadium	2013
see full table on ESPNCricinfo

== Fielding records ==
=== Most catches ===
Fielders	Mat	Catches	Max	Ct/In	Season
Mahmudullah	133	63	2	0.473	2012–present
Ariful Haque	93	56	3	0.602	2012–present
Sabbir Rahman	105	49	4	0.466	2012–present
Imrul Kayes	115	49	3	0.426	2012–present
Tamim Iqbal	118	42	3	0.355	2012–present
see full table on ESPNCricinfo

=== Most catches in a season ===
Fielders	Team	Mat	Catches	Max	Ct/In	Season
Imrul Kayes	Comilla Victorians	11	17	3	1.545	2022
Ariful Haque	Sylhet Strikers	12	13	3	1.083	2025
Mahmudullah	Khulna Titans	12	13	2	1.083	2017
Darren Stevens	Dhaka Gladiators	12	11	2	0.916	2012
Rilee Rossouw	Khulna Tigers	14	11	2	0.785	2019–20
see full table on ESPNCricinfo

=== Most catches in an innings ===
Fielders	Team	Catches	Opponent	Venue	Season
Will Jacks	Comilla Victorians	5	Chattogram Challengers	Zohur Ahmed Chowdhury Stadium	2024
Sabbir Rahman	Sylhet Sixers	4	Rajshahi Kings	Sylhet International Cricket Stadium	2017
Cameron Delport	Dhaka Dynamites	4	Sylhet Sixers	Sher-e-Bangla National Cricket Stadium	2017
Adam Lyth	Rangpur Riders	4	Dhaka Dynamites	Sher-e-Bangla National Cricket Stadium	2017
Carlos Brathwaite	Khulna Titans	4	Rajshahi Kings	Sylhet International Cricket Stadium	2019
see full table on ESPNCricinfo

== Miscellaneous records ==
Records	Player/Team	Statistics	Ref
Team
Most wins	Rangpur Riders	70	
Most defeats	Sylhet Titans	77	
Highest win%	Comilla Victorians	62.50 %	
Largest victory (runs)	Dhaka Capitals	149	
Batting
Most 100+	Chris Gayle	5	
Most 50+	Tamim Iqbal	34	
Highest Partnership	Tanzid Hasan and Litton Das (Dhaka Capitals)	241	
Most ducks	Anamul Haque	15	
Bowling
Most 4 wicket hauls	Taskin Ahmed	7	
Most 5 wicket hauls	Thisara Perera	2	
Other Miscellaneous
Most matches	Mushfiqur Rahim	144	
Most matches as captain	Mashrafe Mortaza	105	
Most matches as umpire	Masudur Rahman	94	

== Awards ==
=== Most Runs Award ===
Season	Player	Team	Mat	Runs	HS	Avg.	S/R	100s	50s
2012	Ahmed Shehzad	Barisal Burners	12	486	113*	48.60	155.76	1	4
2013	Mushfiqur Rahim	Sylhet Royals	13	440	86	40.00	132.93	0	3
2015	Kumar Sangakkara	Dhaka Dynamites	10	349	75	38.77	117.11	0	2
2016	Tamim Iqbal	Chittagong Vikings	13	476	75	43.27	115.81	0	6
2017	Chris Gayle	Rangpur Riders	11	485	146*	53.88	176.36	2	2
2019	Rilee Rossouw	Rangpur Riders	14	558	100*	69.75	150.00	1	5
2019–20	Rilee Rossouw	Khulna Tigers	14	495	71*	45.00	155.17	0	4
2022	Will Jacks	Chattogram Challengers	11	414	92*	41.40	155.05	0	4
2023	Najmul Hossain Shanto	Sylhet Strikers	15	516	89*	39.69	116.74	0	4
2024	Tamim Iqbal	Fortune Barishal	15	492	71	35.14	127.13	0	3
2025	Mohammad Naim	Khulna Tigers	14	511	111*	42.58	143.94	1	3
see full list on ESPNCricinfo

=== Most Wickets Award ===
Season	Player	Team	Mat	Wkts	BBI	Avg.	Econ.	5WI	4WI
2012	Elias Sunny	Dhaka Gladiators	12	17	3/17	14.88	6.71	0	0
2012	Mohammad Sami	Duronto Rajshahi	11	17	5/6	15.76	6.51	1	1
2013	Alfonso Thomas	Dhaka Gladiators	12	20	3/19	14.90	6.79	0	0
2015	Kevon Cooper	Barisal Bulls	9	22	5/15	9.31	5.85	1	1
2016	Dwayne Bravo	Dhaka Dynamites	13	21	3/10	15.95	7.55	0	0
2017	Shakib Al Hasan	Dhaka Dynamites	13	22	5/16	13.22	6.49	1	1
2019	Shakib Al Hasan	Dhaka Dynamites	15	23	4/16	17.65	7.25	0	1
2019–20	Mustafizur Rahman	Rangpur Rangers	12	20	3/10	15.60	7.01	0	0
2019–20	Mohammad Amir	Khulna Tigers	13	20	6/17	17.75	7.05	1	0
2019–20	Rubel Hossain	Chattogram Challengers	13	20	3/17	17.85	7.31	0	0
2019–20	Robert Frylinck	Khulna Tigers	14	20	5/16	19.60	7.39	0	0
2022	Mustafizur Rahman	Comilla Victorians	11	19	5/27	13.47	6.62	1	0
2023	Tanvir Islam	Comilla Victorians	12	17	4/33	17.58	6.36	0	1
2023	Hasan Mahmud	Rangpur Riders	14	17	3/12	24.82	7.98	0	0
2024	Shoriful Islam	Durdanto Dhaka	12	22	4/24	15.86	7.81	0	1
2025	Taskin Ahmed	Durbar Rajshahi	12	25	7/19	12.04	6.49	1	0
see full list on ESPNCricinfo

=== Maximum Sixes Award ===
Season	Winner	Team	Mat	Sixes	Six/In
2012	Chris Gayle	Barisal Burners	5	26	5.2
2013	Elton Chigumbura	Sylhet Royals	14	19	1.35
2015	Chris Gayle	Barisal Bulls	4	12	3
2016	Mehedi Maruf	Dhaka Dynamites	14	20	1.43
2017	Chris Gayle	Rangpur Riders	11	47	4.28
2019	Nicholas Pooran	Sylhet Sixers	11	28	2.54
2019	Andre Russell	Dhaka Dynamites	15	28	1.87
2019–20	Rilee Rossouw	Khulna Tigers	14	23	1.64
2022	Andre Fletcher	Khulna Tigers	11	21	1.91
2023	Johnson Charles	Comilla Victorians	9	26	2.89
2024	Towhid Hridoy	Comilla Victorians	14	24	1.71
2025	Tanzid Hasan	Dhaka Capitals	12	36	3

=== Player of the match (final) and series ===
Season	Player of the match in finals		Player of the series	
Season	Player	Team	Player	Team
2012	Imran Nazir	Dhaka Gladiators	Shakib Al Hasan	Khulna Royal Bengals
2013	Mosharraf Hossain	Dhaka Gladiators	Shakib Al Hasan	Dhaka Gladiators
2015	Alok Kapali	Comilla Victorians	Ashar Zaidi	Comilla Victorians
2016	Kumar Sangakkara	Dhaka Dynamites	Mahmudullah	Khulna Titans
2017	Chris Gayle	Rangpur Riders	Chris Gayle	Rangpur Riders
2019	Tamim Iqbal	Comilla Victorians	Shakib Al Hasan	Dhaka Dynamites
2019–20	Andre Russell	Rajshahi Royals	Andre Russell	Rajshahi Royals
2022	Sunil Narine	Comilla Victorians	Shakib Al Hasan	Fortune Barishal
2023	Johnson Charles	Comilla Victorians	Najmul Hossain Shanto	Sylhet Strikers
2024	Kyle Mayers	Fortune Barishal	Tamim Iqbal	Fortune Barishal
2025	Tamim Iqbal	Fortune Barishal	Mehidy Hasan Miraz	Khulna Tigers
