= Rayad Emrit =

Trinidadian cricketer (born 1981)

Personal information
- Full name: Rayad Ryan Emrit
- Born: 8 March 1981 (age 45); Saint Joseph, Trinidad and Tobago
- Nickname: Emo
- Batting: Right-handed
- Bowling: Right-arm fast-medium
- Role: Bowler

International information
- National side: West Indies
- ODI debut (cap 133): 27 January 2007 v India
- Last ODI: 31 January 2007 v India
- ODI shirt no.: 51
- T20I debut (cap 70): 3 January 2018 v New Zealand
- Last T20I: 3 April 2018 v Pakistan
- T20I shirt no.: 51

Domestic team information
- Years: Team
- 2003–present: Trinidad and Tobago
- 2013–2015: Barbados Tridents
- 2016–2018: Guyana Amazon Warriors (squad no. 51)
- 2016–2017: Barisal Bulls
- 2017: Quetta Gladiators (squad no. 51)
- 2017: Bloem City Blazers
- 2019–present: St Kitts and Nevis Patriots
- 2019/20: Chattogram Challengers

Career statistics
Competition	ODI	T20I	FC	LA
Matches	2	4	84	72
Runs scored	13	17	2,197	547
Batting average	13.00	5.67	19.10	16.08
100s/50s	0/0	0/0	3/5	0/0
Top score	13	11	113*	43
Balls bowled	84	96	10,294	2,872
Wickets	0	4	175	85
Bowling average	–	39.00	26.72	25.23
5 wickets in innings	–	0	4	1
10 wickets in match	–	0	0	0
Best bowling	–	1/24	6/35	5/56
Catches/stumpings	1/–	0/–	50/–	17/–
- Source: Cricinfo, 26 October 2017

Rayad Ryan Emrit (born 8 March 1981) is a Trinidadian cricketer. Emrit has represented the West Indies Senior team, making his first ODI appearance just a year after his regional debut in 2007. Emrit maintained discipline and motivation and defied the odds to be next selected for the West Indies T20 Champion team in 2018 against New Zealand. An allrounder who is a right-handed batsman and right-arm medium-fast seamer. In domestic cricket, he has captained both his native Trinidad and Tobago side, and the Guyana Amazon Warriors in CPL 2017. Rayad Emrit is the current captain of the St Kitts and Nevis Patriots in the Caribbean Premier League. Emrit was selected as captain of the Patriots ahead of Chris Gayle and Dwayne Bravo as captain in the 'biggest party in sport' CPL in 2021.

== Domestic career ==
Emrit represents Trinidad and Tobago in West Indian domestic cricket. Emrit captained Trinidad and Tobago's Team in the 2007 Los Angeles Open 20/20 Cricket Tournament, which they came in 1st place. Emrit was the pro at Westhoughton Cricket club for the 2006 season. In August 2017, he was named in Bloem City Blazers' squad for the first season of the T20 Global League. However, in October 2017, Cricket South Africa initially postponed the tournament until November 2018, with it being cancelled soon after.

=== T20 franchise career ===
In 2017, Rayad Emrit played his debut Pakistan Super League (PSL) match from Quetta Gladiators which was the final of the PSL's second edition held in Gaddafi Stadium, Lahore. In this match he took 3 wickets of 31 runs in 4 overs. Quetta could not chase down the Zalmi score and finished runners up.

On 3 June 2018, he was selected to play for the Winnipeg Hawks in the players' draft for the inaugural edition of the Global T20 Canada tournament. In June 2019, he was selected to play for the Winnipeg Hawks franchise team in the 2019 Global T20 Canada tournament. In November 2019, he was selected to play for the Chattogram Challengers in the 2019–20 Bangladesh Premier League.

In July 2020, he was named in the St Kitts & Nevis Patriots squad for the 2020 Caribbean Premier League. Rayad also represents the US Tigers in all the United States tournaments that they participate in. In June 2021, he was selected to take part in the Minor League Cricket tournament in the United States following the players' draft.

== International career ==
On 12 January 2007 he was named in the 14-member West Indian squad for a One Day International (ODI) series against India. Emrit made his ODI debut in the series on 27 January 2007. In November 2017, he was named in the West Indies' Twenty20 International (T20I) squad for their series against New Zealand. He made his T20I debut against New Zealand on 3 January 2018.
