= Yasir Ali (Bangladeshi cricketer) =

Bangladeshi cricketer

Yasir Ali Rabbi
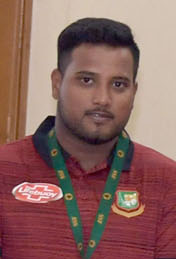
- Ali in 2019

Personal information
- Full name: Yasir Ali Chowdhury
- Born: 3 June 1996 (age 30); Chittagong, Bangladesh
- Height: 182 cm (6 ft 0 in)
- Batting: Right-handed
- Bowling: Right arm off break
- Role: Middle-Order-Batter

International information
- National side: Bangladesh (2021–present)
- Test debut (cap 98): 26 November 2021 v Pakistan
- Last Test: 14 December 2022 v India
- ODI debut (cap 137): 23 February 2022 v Afghanistan
- Last ODI: 20 March 2023 v Ireland
- T20I debut (cap 75): 3 March 2022 v Afghanistan
- Last T20I: 15 July 2026 v Zimbabwe

Career statistics
Competition	Test	ODI	T20I	FC
Matches	6	9	13	85
Runs scored	205	102	204	5,305
Batting average	20.50	14.57	22.66	43.13
100s/50s	0/1	0/1	0/1	11/32
Top score	55	50	54	165
Catches/stumpings	5/–	3/–	7/–	97/–
Medal record
Men's cricket
Representing Bangladesh
Asian Games
Bronze medal – third place	2022 Hangzhou	Team
South Asian Games
Gold medal – first place	2019 Kathmandu/Pokhara	Team
- Source: Cricinfo, 19 July 2026

Yasir Ali Chowdhury (born 3 June 1996), also known as Yasir Ali Rabbi, is a Bangladeshi cricketer.

Yasir Ali is a middle-order batter who played the 2014 Under-19 World Cup. He plays for Abahani Limited in List A cricket. He made his first-class debut for Chittagong Division in December 2012 against Barisal Division. He made his international debut for the Bangladesh cricket team in November 2021, against Pakistan.

== Career ==
In October 2018, he was named in the squad for the Chittagong Vikings team, following the draft for the 2018–19 Bangladesh Premier League. In December 2018, he was named in Bangladesh's team for the 2018 ACC Emerging Teams Asia Cup. In April 2019, he was named in Bangladesh's One Day International (ODI) squad for the 2019 Ireland Tri-Nation Series, but he did not play.

In August 2019, he was one of 35 cricketers named in a training camp ahead of Bangladesh's 2019–20 season. In November 2019, he was named in Bangladesh's squad for the 2019 ACC Emerging Teams Asia Cup in Bangladesh. Later the same month, he was selected to play for the Cumilla Warriors in the 2019–20 Bangladesh Premier League, and he was named in Bangladesh's under-23's squad for the men's cricket tournament at the 2019 South Asian Games. The Bangladesh team won the gold medal, after they beat Sri Lanka by seven wickets in the final.

In February 2020, he was named in Bangladesh's Test squad for their one-off match against Zimbabwe. In January 2021, he was one of four uncapped players to be named in a preliminary squad for the One Day International (ODI) series against the West Indies. In January 2021, he was named in Bangladesh's Test squad for their series against the West Indies. In April 2021, he was named in Bangladesh's preliminary Test squad for their series against Sri Lanka. In June 2021, he was again named in Bangladesh's Test squad, this time for the one-off Test against Zimbabwe.

In November 2021, he was named in Bangladesh's Twenty20 International (T20I) squad for their series against Pakistan. Later the same month, he was again named in Bangladesh's Test squad, also for the series against Pakistan. He made his Test debut on 26 November 2021, for Bangladesh against Pakistan.

In February 2022, he was named in Bangladesh's One Day International (ODI) squad for their series against Afghanistan. Later the same month, he was named in Bangladesh's T20I squad, also for the series against Afghanistan. He made his ODI debut on 23 February 2022, for Bangladesh against Afghanistan. He made his T20I debut on 3 March 2022, also for Bangladesh against Afghanistan.

As of January 2025, he is a member of Durbar Rajshahi team of Bangladesh Premier League.
