= 2019–20 Bangladesh Premier League =

Cricket Tournament

Bangladesh Premier League 2019–20
- 2019-20 BPL Logo
- Dates: 11 December 2019 – 17 January 2020
- Administrator: Bangladesh Cricket Board
- Cricket format: Twenty20
- Tournament format(s): Double round-robin and playoffs
- Host: Bangladesh
- Champions: Rajshahi Royals (1st title)
- Runners-up: Khulna Tigers
- Participants: 7
- Matches: 46
- Player of the series: Andre Russell (Rajshahi Royals)
- Most runs: Rilee Rossouw (Khulna Tigers) (495)
- Most wickets: Mustafizur Rahman (Rangpur Rangers); Mohammad Amir (Khulna Tigers); Rubel Hossain (Chattogram Challengers); Robert Frylinck (Khulna Tigers) (20 wickets each)
- Official website: BPL

The Bangladesh Premier League 2019–20, also known as BPL Season 7 or Bangabandhu BPL Presented by AKASH DTH and Powered by TVS (for sponsorship reasons), was the seventh season of the Bangladesh Premier League (BPL), the top level professional Twenty20 cricket league in Bangladesh. The competition was organised by the Bangladesh Cricket Board (BCB). Comilla Victorians were the defending champions. The season was originally scheduled to start on 6 December 2019 and end on 11 January 2020, with the opening ceremony to be held on 3 December 2019. However, the tournament was delayed by five days and started on 11 December 2019 and ended on 17 January 2020, with the opening ceremony held on 8 December 2019.

Chittagong Vikings were announced as not taking part in this edition of the tournament after their ownership was sold, and were replaced by two new teams. A total of eight teams were originally scheduled to participate in this edition of the tournament, with contracts of pre-signed cricketers being cancelled until the players' draft. However, the idea was cancelled, with the number of teams being reverted to seven, and Chittagong Vikings being renamed to Chattogram Challengers and reinstated after the change of format by the BCB.

In the final match, Rajshahi Royals defeated Khulna Tigers by 21 runs to win their first ever BPL title. Rajshahi Royals captain Andre Russell won both Player of the match and Player of the Tournament awards for his all-round performances. Rilee Rossouw was the leading run scorer in the tournament with 495 runs while the leading wicket-taker was tied with four players with 20 wickets.

Most 2019–20 BPL matches were played in front of small crowds, with only a few thousand spectators at most games.

== Changes of rules ==
On 11 September 2019, BCB president Nazmul Hasan Papon informed the media about certain changes in the rules for the ongoing season during a press briefing. Due to having some conflict of interests between BPL Governing Council and all other franchises, the BCB decided to run this edition of the BPL themselves without taking any franchises. The Board wanted to mark the occasion of the 100th birth anniversary of Bangabandhu in 2020 and to pay homage to him, the tournament was named "Bangabandhu BPL" after him. The responsibility to manage the team was on the BCB. The players’ transportation and accommodation were managed by the board. On 13 November 2019, the sponsorship and names of Chittagong, Dhaka, Khulna, Rajshahi and Sylhet teams were confirmed. The Comilla and Rangpur teams were sponsored by BCB themselves.

== Draft and squads ==
The players' draft was scheduled to be held on 12 November 2019. However, the tournament was delayed by five days and the draft was held on 17 November 2019. Out of 7 teams, 5 teams are sponsored by private corporate firms while 2 teams are sponsored by BCB itself.

On 16 November 2019, BPL Governing Council unveiled the logo for this season and the names of the participating 7 teams. The squads were confirmed during the draft.

Chattogram Challengers Coach: Paul Nixon	Cumilla Warriors Coach: Ottis Gibson	Dhaka Platoon Coach: Mohammad Salahuddin	Khulna Tigers Coach: James Foster	Rajshahi Royals Coach: Owais Shah	Rangpur Rangers Coach: Mark O'Donnell	Sylhet Thunder Coach: Herschelle Gibbs
(Bangladesh) Mahmudullah (c); (Bangladesh) Imrul Kayes; (Bangladesh) Nurul Hasan; (Cricket West Indies) Rayad Emrit; (Bangladesh) Nasir Hossain; (Bangladesh) Rubel Hossain; (Cricket West Indies) Chris Gayle; (Bangladesh) Enamul Haque; (Bangladesh) Muktar Ali; (Bangladesh) Pinak Ghosh; (Sri Lanka) Avishka Fernando; (Bangladesh) Nasum Ahmed; (Bangladesh) Junaid Siddique; (Zimbabwe) Ryan Burl; (Pakistan) Imad Wasim; (Bangladesh) Jubair Hossain; (Pakistan) Muhammad Musa; (Cricket West Indies) Chadwick Walton; (Bangladesh) Mehedi Hasan Rana; (England) Liam Plunkett; (Bangladesh) Ziaur Rahman; (Sri Lanka) Asela Gunaratne; (Cricket West Indies) Kesrick Williams (Note: left out for national duty and replaced by Liam Plunkett); (Cricket West Indies) Lendl Simmons (Note: left out for national duty and Chris Gayle replaced him)	(Bangladesh) Soumya Sarkar (c); (England) Dawid Malan; (Sri Lanka) Dasun Shanaka; (Bangladesh) Al-Amin Hossain; (Bangladesh) Sabbir Rahman; (Bangladesh) Yasir Ali; (Sri Lanka) Kusal Perera; (Afghanistan) Mujeeb Ur Rahman; (Bangladesh) Sunzamul Islam; (Bangladesh) Abu Hider; (Bangladesh) Mahidul Islam Ankon; (Bangladesh) Sumon Khan; Fardeen Hasan Ony; Ifran Hossain; (Sri Lanka) Bhanuka Rajapaksa; (South Africa) Stiaan van Zyl; (Sri Lanka) Upul Tharanga; (South Africa) David Wiese; (Bangladesh) Robiul Islam Robi	(Bangladesh) Mashrafe Mortaza (c); (Bangladesh) Tamim Iqbal; (Bangladesh) Anamul Haque; (Bangladesh) Hasan Mahmud; (Bangladesh) Mahedi Hasan; (Sri Lanka) Thisara Perera; (Bangladesh) Ariful Haque; (Bangladesh) Mominul Haque; (Bangladesh) Shuvagata Hom; (Pakistan) Asif Ali; (Bangladesh) Raqibul Hasan; (Bangladesh) Jaker Ali; (England) Luis Reece; (Pakistan) Shadab Khan; (Bangladesh) Mohammad Shahid; (Bangladesh) Salauddin Sakil; (Pakistan) Ahmed Shehzad; (Pakistan) Faheem Ashraf; (Pakistan) Wahab Riaz (Note: did not play in the 4th phase in Sylhet); (Pakistan) Shahid Afridi (Note: did not play in the 4th phase in Sylhet due to injury); (England) Laurie Evans (Note: replaced by Ahmed Shehzad)	(Bangladesh) Mushfiqur Rahim (c); (Bangladesh) Shafiul Islam; (Bangladesh) Najmul Hossain Shanto; (Bangladesh) Aminul Islam; (South Africa) Rilee Rossouw; (South Africa) Robert Frylinck; (Bangladesh) Shamsur Rahman; (Bangladesh) Saif Hassan; Mehedi Hasan; (Bangladesh) Shohidul Islam; (Pakistan) Mohammad Amir; (Pakistan) Najibullah Zadran; (Bangladesh) Tanvir Islam; (Bangladesh) Aliss Islam; (Afghanistan) Rahmanullah Gurbaz; (South Africa) Hashim Amla; (Bangladesh) Alauddin Babu; (Pakistan) Aamer Yamin	(Cricket West Indies) Andre Russell (c); (Pakistan) Shoaib Malik; (Bangladesh) Litton Das; (Bangladesh) Afif Hossain; (Bangladesh) Abu Jayed; (Bangladesh) Farhad Reza; (England) Ravi Bopara; (Afghanistan) Hazratullah Zazai; (Bangladesh) Taijul Islam; (Bangladesh) Alok Kapali; (Bangladesh) Kamrul Islam Rabbi; (Bangladesh) Irfan Sukkur; (Pakistan) Mohammad Nawaz; (Pakistan) Mohammad Irfan; (Bangladesh) Minhajul Abedin Afridi; (Bangladesh) Nahidul Islam	(Australia) Shane Watson (c); (England) Tom Abell; (Afghanistan) Mohammad Nabi; (Bangladesh) Mustafizur Rahman; (Bangladesh) Mohammad Naim; (Bangladesh) Arafat Sunny; (Bangladesh) Jahurul Islam; (Bangladesh) Taskin Ahmed; (Bangladesh) Zakir Hasan; (Bangladesh) Fazle Mahmud; (Bangladesh) Nadif Chowdhury; (Bangladesh) Rishad Hossain; (England) Lewis Gregory; (South Africa) Cameron Delport; (Bangladesh) Sanjit Saha; (Pakistan) Junaid Khan; (Afghanistan) Mohammad Shahzad; (Bangladesh) Al-Amin; (Bangladesh) Mukidul Islam; (Bangladesh) Shadman Islam; (Cricket West Indies) ~~Shai Hope~~	(Cricket West Indies) Andre Fletcher (c); (Bangladesh) Mosaddek Hossain; (Bangladesh) Mohammad Mithun; (Bangladesh) Nazmul Islam; (Bangladesh) Sohag Gazi; (Cricket West Indies) Sherfane Rutherford; Shafiqullah; (Bangladesh) Rony Talukdar; Nayeem Hasan; (Bangladesh) Delwar Hossain; (Bangladesh) Monir Hossain; (Cricket West Indies) Johnson Charles; (Afghanistan) Naveen-ul-Haq; (Bangladesh) Rubel Mia; (Sri Lanka) Jeevan Mendis; (Bangladesh) Ebadot Hossain; (Pakistan) Mohammad Sami; (Cricket West Indies) Krishmar Santokie; Abdul Mazid; (Bangladesh) Nazmul Hossain Milon; (Cricket West Indies) ~~Sheldon Cottrell~~

== Venues ==
Chittagong	Dhaka	Sylhet
Zohur Ahmed Chowdhury Stadium	Sher-e-Bangla National Cricket Stadium	Sylhet International Cricket Stadium
Capacity: 20,000	Capacity: 26,000	Capacity: 18,500
Matches: 12	Matches: 28 (incl. Playoffs)	Matches: 6
Zahur Ahmed Chowdhury Stadium	Sher-e-Bangla National Cricket Stadium	Sylhet International Cricket Stadium
2019–20 Bangladesh Premier League is located in Bangladesh

== Results ==
=== Points table ===
Pos	Team	Pld	W	L	NR	Pts	NRR
1	Khulna Tigers (R)	12	8	4	0	16	0.912
2	Rajshahi Royals (C)	12	8	4	0	16	0.420
3	Chattogram Challengers (3)	12	8	4	0	16	0.129
4	Dhaka Platoon (4)	12	7	5	0	14	0.572
5	Cumilla Warriors	12	5	7	0	10	−0.335
6	Rangpur Rangers	12	5	7	0	10	−0.826
7	Sylhet Thunder	12	1	11	0	2	−0.822

Source: Cricinfo.com
- (C) and (R) denotes Champion and Runners-up respectively, (3) and (4) indicates 3rd and 4th position team.
- advanced to the Qualifier 1
- advanced to the Eliminator

=== League progression ===
	League matches												Playoffs		
Team	1	2	3	4	5	6	7	8	9	10	11	12	Q1/E	Q2	F
Chattogram Challengers	2	2	4	6	8	10	10	12	12	14	16	16	W	L	
Cumilla Warriors	2	2	4	4	4	4	4	6	8	10	10	10			
Dhaka Platoon	0	2	4	4	6	8	8	10	12	14	14	14	L		
Khulna Tigers	2	4	6	6	6	8	10	10	10	12	14	16	W		L
Rajshahi Royals	2	4	4	6	8	10	10	10	12	14	14	16	L	W	W
Rangpur Rangers	0	0	0	0	2	2	4	6	6	8	8	10			
Sylhet Thunder	0	0	0	0	2	2	2	2	2	2	2	2			

Win	Loss	No result

Note: The total points at the end of each group match are listed.
Note: Click on the points (group matches) or W/L (Playoffs) to see the match summary.

== League stage ==
A total of 42 matches were played in the league stage, with 24 matches played in Dhaka, 6 matches in Sylhet and 12 in Chittagong.

=== Phase 1 (Dhaka) ===
11 December 2019
13:20
Scorecard

Sylhet Thunder; 162/4 (20 overs)	v	Chattogram Challengers; 163/5 (19 overs)
Mohammad Mithun 84* (48); Rubel Hossain 2/27 (4 overs)		Imrul Kayes 61 (38); Nazmul Islam 2/23 (3 overs)

Chattogram Challengers won by 5 wickets
Sher-e-Bangla National Cricket Stadium, Dhaka
Umpires: Prageeth Rambukwella (SL) and Sharfuddoula (Ban)
Player of the match: Imrul Kayes (Chattogram Challengers)

- Chattogram Challengers won the toss and elected to field.

11 December 2019
18:30 (D/N)
Scorecard

Cumilla Warriors; 173/7 (20 overs)	v	Rangpur Rangers; 68 (14 overs)
Dasun Shanaka 75* (31); Lewis Gregory 2/25 (3 overs)		Mohammad Naim 17 (27); Al-Amin Hossain 3/14 (3 overs)

Cumilla Warriors won by 105 runs
Sher-e-Bangla National Cricket Stadium, Dhaka
Umpires: Tanvir Ahmed (Ban) and Masudur Rahman (Ban)
Player of the match: Dasun Shanaka (Cumilla Warriors)

- Cumilla Warriors won the toss and elected to bat.

12 December 2019
13:20
Scorecard

Dhaka Platoon; 134/9 (20 overs)	v	Rajshahi Royals; 136/1 (18.2 overs)
Anamul Haque 38 (33); Abu Jayed 2/43 (4 overs)		Hazratullah Zazai 56* (47); Mahedi Hasan 1/23 (4 overs)

Rajshahi Royals won by 9 wickets
Sher-e-Bangla National Cricket Stadium, Dhaka
Umpires: Sharfuddoula (Ban) and Gazi Sohel (Ban)
Player of the match: Ravi Bopara (Rajshahi Royals)

- Rajshahi Royals won the toss and elected to field.
- Hasan Mahmud (Dhaka Platoon) made his T20 debut.

12 December 2019
18:30 (D/N)
Scorecard

Chattogram Challengers; 144/6 (20 overs)	v	Khulna Tigers; 146/2 (13.5 overs)
Muktar Ali 29* (14); Robert Frylinck 1/21 (4 overs)		Rilee Rossouw 64* (38); Nasum Ahmed 1/18 (2 overs)

Khulna Tigers won by 8 wickets
Sher-e-Bangla National Cricket Stadium, Dhaka
Umpires: Masudur Rahman (Ban) and Prageeth Rambukwella (SL)
Player of the match: Rilee Rossouw (Khulna Tigers)

- Khulna Tigers won the toss and elected to field.

13 December 2019
14:00
Scorecard

Sylhet Thunder; 91 (15.3)	v	Rajshahi Royals; 95/2 (10.5 overs)
Mohammad Mithun 20 (18); Alok Kapali 3/17 (3 overs)		Litton Das 44* (26); Nayeem Hasan 1/16 (3 overs)

Rajshahi Royals won by 8 wickets
Sher-e-Bangla National Cricket Stadium, Dhaka
Umpires: Mahfuzur Rahman (Ban) and Sharfuddoula (Ban)
Player of the match: Alok Kapali (Rajshahi Royals)

- Rajshahi Royals won the toss and elected to field.

13 December 2019
19:00 (D/N)
Scorecard

Dhaka Platoon; 180/7 (20 overs)	v	Cumilla Warriors; 160/9 (20 overs)
Tamim Iqbal 74 (53); Soumya Sarkar 2/39 (4 overs)		Dawid Malan 40 (36); Thisara Perera 5/30 (4 overs)

Dhaka Platoon won by 20 runs
Sher-e-Bangla National Cricket Stadium, Dhaka
Umpires: Masudur Rahman (Ban) and Prageeth Rambukwella (SL)
Player of the match: Thisara Perera (Dhaka Platoon)

- Cumilla Warriors won the toss and elected to field.

14 December 2019
13:20
Scorecard

Rangpur Rangers; 157/8 (20 overs)	v	Chattogram Challengers; 158/4 (18.2 overs)
Mohammad Naim 78 (54); Kesrick Williams 2/35 (4 overs)		Chadwick Walton 50 (34); Lewis Gregory 2/27 (4 overs)

Chattogram Challengers won by 6 wickets
Sher-e-Bangla National Cricket Stadium, Dhaka
Umpires: Morshed Ali Khan (Ban) and Sharfuddoula (Ban)
Player of the match: Mohammad Naim (Rangpur Rangers)

- Chattogram Challengers won the toss and elected to field.

14 December 2019
18:30 (D/N)
Scorecard

Dhaka Platoon; 182/4 (20 overs)	v	Sylhet Thunder; 158/7 (20 overs)
Anamul Haque 62 (42); Mosaddek Hossain 1/16 (3 overs)		Mosaddek Hossain 60* (44); Hasan Mahmud 2/24 (4 overs)

Dhaka Platoon won by 24 runs
Sher-e-Bangla National Cricket Stadium, Dhaka
Umpires: Masudur Rahman (Ban) and Prageeth Rambukwella (SL)
Player of the match: Anamul Haque (Dhaka Platoon)

- Sylhet Thunders won the toss and elected to field.

=== Phase 2 (Chittagong) ===
17 December 2019
13:20
Scorecard

Rajshahi Royals; 189/4 (20 overs)	v	Khulna Tigers; 192/5 (19,2 overs)
Shoaib Malik 87 (50); Mohammad Amir 2/36 (4 overs)		Mushfiqur Rahim 96 (51); Andre Russell 2/41 (4 overs)

Khulna Tigers won by 5 wickets
Zohur Ahmed Chowdhury Stadium, Chittagong
Umpires: Prageeth Rambukwella (SL) and Sharfuddoula (Ban)
Player of the match: Mushfiqur Rahim (Khulna Tigers)

- Khulna Tigers won the toss and elected to field.

17 December 2019
18:30 (D/N)
Scorecard

Sylhet Thunder; 129/8 (20 overs)	v	Chattogram Challengers; 130/6 (18 overs)
Andre Fletcher 38 (32); Mehedi Hasan Rana 4/23 (4 overs)		Lendl Simmons 44 (37); Krishmar Santokie 3/13 (4 overs)

Chattogram Challengers won by 4 wickets
Zohur Ahmed Chowdhury Stadium, Chittagong
Umpires: David Millns (Eng) and Masudur Rahman (Ban)
Player of the match: Mehedi Hasan Rana (Chattogram Challengers)

- Chattogram Challengers won the toss and elected to field.

18 December 2019
13:20
Scorecard

Rangpur Rangers; 181/8 (20 overs)	v	Cumilla Warriors; 182/4 (19.4 overs)
Mohammad Shahzad 61 (27); Mujeeb Ur Rahman 2/25 (4 overs)		Sabbir Rahman 49 (40); Tom Abell 1/21 (2.4 overs)

Cumilla Warriors won by 6 wickets
Zohur Ahmed Chowdhury Stadium, Chittagong
Umpires: David Millns (Eng) and Mahfuzur Rahman (Ban)
Player of the match: Dawid Malan (Cumilla Warriors)

- Rangpur Rangers won the toss and elected to bat.

18 December 2019
18:30 (D/N)
Scorecard

Chattogram Challengers; 221/4 (20 overs)	v	Dhaka Platoon; 205 (20 overs)
Mahmudullah 59 (28); Hasan Mahmud 2/55 (4 overs)		Mominul Haque 52 (35); Mehedi Hasan Rana 3/23 (4 overs)

Chattogram Challengers won by 16 runs
Zohur Ahmed Chowdhury Stadium, Chittagong
Umpires: Prageeth Rambukwella (SL) and Sharfuddoula (Ban)
Player of the match: Mehedi Hasan Rana (Chattogram Challengers)

- Dhaka Platoon won the toss and elected to field.

20 December 2019
14:00
Scorecard

Rangpur Rangers; 137/9 (20 overs)	v	Khulna Tigers; 138/2 (12.3 overs)
Mohammad Naim 49 (32); Shafiul Islam 3/21 (4 overs)		Rilee Rossouw 66* (31); Mustafizur Rahman 1/18 (2 overs)

Khulna Tigers won by 8 wickets
Zohur Ahmed Chowdhury Stadium, Chittagong
Umpires: Tanvir Ahmed (Ban) and Prageeth Rambukwella (SL)
Player of the match: Shafiul Islam (Khulna Tigers)

- Khulna Tigers won the toss and elected to field.

20 December 2019
19:00 (D/N)
Scorecard

Chattogram Challengers; 238/4 (20 overs)	v	Cumilla Warriors; 222/7 (20 overs)
Chadwick Walton 71* (27); Soumya Sarkar 2/44 (3 overs)		Dawid Malan 84 (38); Mehedi Hasan Rana 4/28 (4 overs)

Chattogram Challengers won by 16 runs
Zohur Ahmed Chowdhury Stadium, Chittagong
Umpires: David Millns (Eng) and Masudur Rahman (Ban)
Player of the match: Chadwick Walton (Chattogram Challengers)

- Cumilla Warriors won the toss and elected to field.
- Chattogram Challengers scored the second highest team total in BPL history (238).
- It was the highest match aggregate in the BPL (460).

21 December 2019
13:20
Scorecard

Sylhet Thunder; 232/5 (20 overs)	v	Khulna Tigers; 152 (18.3 overs)
Andre Fletcher 103* (57); Robert Frylinck 2/37 (4 overs)		Rilee Rossouw 52 (32); Krishmar Santokie 3/37 (4 overs)

Sylhet Thunder won by 80 runs
Zohur Ahmed Chowdhury Stadium, Chittagong
Umpires: Mahfuzur Rahman (Ban) and Prageeth Rambukwella (SL)
Player of the match: Andre Fletcher (Sylhet Thunder)

- Khulna Tigers won the toss and elected to field.

21 December 2019
18:30 (D/N)
Scorecard

Chattogram Challengers; 163/7 (20 overs)	v	Rangpur Rangers; 167/4 (18.4 overs)
Avishka Fernando 72 (40); Mustafizur Rahman 2/23 (4 overs)		Lewis Gregory 76* (37); Rubel Hossain 2/37 (4 overs)

Rangpur Rangers won by 6 wickets
Zohur Ahmed Chowdhury Stadium, Chittagong
Umpires: David Millns (Eng) and Masudur Rahman (Ban)
Player of the match: Lewis Gregory (Rangpur Rangers)

- Rangpur Rangers won the toss and elected to field.

23 December 2019
13:20
Scorecard

Cumilla Warriors; 160/3 (20 overs)	v	Dhaka Platoon; 161/5 (19.5 overs)
Bhanuka Rajapaksa 96* (65); Mahedi Hasan 2/9 (4 overs)		Mahedi Hasan 59 (29); Mujeeb Ur Rahman 2/22 (4 overs)

Dhaka Platoon won by 5 wickets
Zohur Ahmed Chowdhury Stadium, Chittagong
Umpires: Prageeth Rambukwella (SL) and Gazi Sohel (Ban)
Player of the match: Mahedi Hasan (Dhaka Platoon)

- Dhaka Platoon won the toss and elected to field.

23 December 2019
18:30 (D/N)
Scorecard

Khulna Tigers; 145/9 (20 overs)	v	Rajshahi Royals; 149/3 (18 overs)
Shamsur Rahman 55 (46); Andre Russell 4/37 (4 overs)		Litton Das 58 (44); Shohidul Islam 1/23 (3 overs)

Rajshahi Royals won by 7 wickets
Zohur Ahmed Chowdhury Stadium, Chittagong
Umpires: Morshed Ali Khan (Ban) and David Millns (Eng)
Player of the match: Andre Russell (Rajshahi Royals)

- Rajshahi Royals won the toss and elected to field.

24 December 2019
13:20
Scorecard

Sylhet Thunder; 174/4 (20 overs)	v	Dhaka Platoon; 175/2 (18.3 overs)
Johnson Charles 73 (45); Shahid Afridi 2/26 (4 overs)		Tamim Iqbal 60* (49); Ebadot Hossain 1/24 (3.3 overs)

Dhaka Platoon won by 8 wickets
Zohur Ahmed Chowdhury Stadium, Chittagong
Umpires: David Millns (Eng) and Gazi Sohel (Ban)
Player of the match: Mahedi Hasan (Dhaka Platoon)

- Sylhet Thunder won the toss and elected to bat.

24 December 2019
18:30 (D/N)
Scorecard

Cumilla Warriors; 170/8 (20 overs)	v	Rajshahi Royals; 171/3 (17.5 overs)
Dawid Malan 100* (54); Mohammad Irfan 2/23 (4 overs)		Afif Hossain 76 (53); Al-Amin Hossain 2/49 (3.5 overs)

Rajshahi Royals won by 7 wickets
Zohur Ahmed Chowdhury Stadium, Chittagong
Umpires: Morshed Ali Khan (Ban) and Prageeth Rambukwella (SL)
Player of the match: Dawid Malan (Cumilla Warriors) and Afif Hossain (Rajshahi Royals)

- Rajshahi Royals won the toss and elected to field.

=== Phase 3 (Dhaka) ===
27 December 2019
14:00
Scorecard

Dhaka Platoon; 124/9 (20 overs)	v	Chattogram Challengers; 125/4 (18.4 overs)
Mominul Haque 32 (34); Ryan Burl 2/1 (1 over)		Imrul Kayes 54* (53); Wahab Riaz 2/18 (3.4 overs)

Chattogram Challengers won by 6 wickets
Sher-e-Bangla National Cricket Stadium, Dhaka
Umpires: David Millns (Eng) and Sharfuddoula (Ban)
Player of the match: Imrul Kayes (Chattogram Challengers)

- Chattogram Challengers won the toss and elected to field.

27 December 2019
19:00 (D/N)
Scorecard

Khulna Tigers; 182/7 (20 overs)	v	Rangpur Rangers; 130/9 (20 overs)
Mushfiqur Rahim 59 (48); Mustafizur Rahman 3/28 (4 overs)		Lewis Gregory 34 (26); Shohidul Islam 4/23 (4 overs)

Khulna Tigers won by 52 runs
Sher-e-Bangla National Cricket Stadium, Dhaka
Umpires: Mahfuzur Rahman (Ban) and Prageeth Rambukwella (SL)
Player of the match: Shohidul Islam (Khulna Tigers)

- Rangpur Riders won the toss and elected to field.

28 December 2019
13:20
Scorecard

Rajshahi Royals; 190/4 (20 overs)	v	Cumilla Warriors; 175/4 (20 overs)
Shoaib Malik 61 (38); Soumya Sarkar 1/18 (2 overs)		Soumya Sarkar 88* (48); Shoaib Malik 1/19 (3 overs)

Rajshahi Royals won by 15 runs
Sher-e-Bangla National Cricket Stadium, Dhaka
Umpires: Morshed Ali Khan (Ban) and David Millns (Eng)
Player of the match: Shoaib Malik (Rajshahi Royals)

- Cumilla Warriors won the toss and elected to field.
- Andre Russell (Rajshahi Royals) hit his 400th six in T20 cricket.

28 December 2019
18:30 (D/N)
Scorecard

Sylhet Thunder; 157/4 (20 overs)	v	Khulna Tigers; 158/2 (17.5 overs)
Rubel Mia 39 (44); Shohidul Islam 2/26 (4 overs)		Mehedi Hasan 87* (62); Sherfane Rutherford 1/9 (1 over)

Khulna Tigers won by 8 wickets
Sher-e-Bangla National Cricket Stadium, Dhaka
Umpires: Mahfuzur Rahman (Ban) and Prageeth Rambukwella (SL)
Player of the match: Mehedi Hasan (Khulna Tigers)

- Khulna Tigers won the toss and elected to field.

30 December 2019
13:20
Scorecard

Sylhet Thunder; 133/9 (20 overs)	v	Rangpur Rangers; 134/3 (17.2 overs)
Mohammad Mithun 62 (47); Mustafizur Rahman 3/10 (4 overs)		Cameron Delport 63 (28); Naveen-ul-Haq 2/13 (4 overs)

Rangpur Rangers won by 7 wickets
Sher-e-Bangla National Cricket Stadium, Dhaka
Umpires: Moniruzzaman (Ban) and Prageeth Rambukwella (SL)
Player of the match: Mustafizur Rahman (Rangpur Rangers)

- Rangpur Rangers won the toss and elected to field.

30 December 2019
18:30 (D/N)
Scorecard

Dhaka Platoon; 174/5 (20 overs)	v	Rajshahi Royals; 100 (16.4 overs)
Tamim Iqbal 68* (52); Farhad Reza 2/44 (3 overs)		Afif Hossain 31 (23); Wahab Riaz 5/8 (3.4 overs)

Dhaka Platoon won by 74 runs
Sher-e-Bangla National Cricket Stadium, Dhaka
Umpires: Tanvir Ahmed (Ban) and David Millns (Eng)
Player of the match: Wahab Riaz (Dhaka Platoon)

- Rajshahi Royals won the toss and elected to field.
- Jaker Ali (Dhaka Platoon) took the most number of catches and effected the most number of dismissals as a wicket-keeper in BPL (6 catches).

31 December 2019
13:20
Scorecard

Chattogram Challengers; 159/6 (20 overs)	v	Cumilla Warriors; 161/8 (20 overs)
Lendl Simmons 54 (34); Soumya Sarkar 2/20 (4 overs)		Dawid Malan 74 (51); Rubel Hossain 2/16 (4 overs)

Cumilla Warriors won by 2 wickets
Sher-e-Bangla National Cricket Stadium, Dhaka
Umpires: Masudur Rahman (Ban) and Prageeth Rambukwella (SL)
Player of the match: Dawid Malan (Cumilla Warriors)

- Cumilla Warriors won the toss and elected to field.
- Pinak Ghosh (Chattogram Challengers) made his T20 debut.

31 December 2019
18:30 (D/N)
Scorecard

Rangpur Rangers; 182/6 (20 overs)	v	Rajshahi Royals; 135/8 (20 overs)
Mohammad Naim 55 (47); Mohammad Irfan 2/35 (4 overs)		Alok Kapali 31 (28); Taskin Ahmed 4/29 (4 overs)

Rangpur Rangers won by 47 runs
Sher-e-Bangla National Cricket Stadium, Dhaka
Umpires: Tanvir Ahmed (Ban) and David Millns (Eng)
Player of the match: Lewis Gregory (Rangpur Rangers)

- Rajshahi Royals won the toss and elected to field.

=== Phase 4 (Sylhet) ===
2 January 2020
13:20
Scorecard

Rajshahi Royals; 179/4 (20 overs)	v	Rangpur Rangers; 149/7 (20 overs)
Ravi Bopara 50* (29); Mustafizur Rahman 2/41 (4 overs)		Fazle Mahmud 34 (26); Mohammad Nawaz 2/21 (4 overs)

Rajshahi Royals won by 30 runs
Sylhet International Cricket Stadium, Sylhet
Umpires: David Millns (Eng) and Mahfuzur Rahman (Ban)
Player of the match: Ravi Bopara (Rajshahi Royals)

- Rangpur Rangers won the toss and elected to field.

2 January 2020
18:30 (D/N)
Scorecard

Cumilla Warriors; 140/9 (20 overs)	v	Sylhet Thunder; 140 (20 overs)
Upul Tharanga 45 (31); Sherfane Rutherford 3/19 (4 overs)		Sohag Gazi 52 (31); Mujeeb Ur Rahman 4/12 (4 overs)

Match tied
(Cumilla Warriors won the Super Over)
Sylhet International Cricket Stadium, Sylhet
Umpires: Masudur Rahman (Ban) and Prageeth Rambukwella (SL)
Player of the match: Mujeeb Ur Rahman (Cumilla Warriors)

- Sylhet Thunder won the toss and elected to field.
- This is the second ever tied match in BPL history.

3 January 2020
14:00
Scorecard

Dhaka Platoon; 172/4 (20 overs)	v	Khulna Tigers; 160/8 (20 overs)
Asif Ali 39* (13); Mohammad Amir 2/27 (4 overs)		Mushfiqur Rahim 64 (33); Hasan Mahmud 4/32 (4 overs)

Dhaka Platoon won by 12 runs
Sylhet International Cricket Stadium, Sylhet
Umpires: Tanvir Ahmed (Ban) and Prageeth Rambukwella (SL)
Player of the match: Hasan Mahmud (Dhaka Platoon)

- Khulna Tigers won the toss and elected to field.

3 January 2020
19:00 (D/N)
Scorecard

Rangpur Rangers; 199/5 (20 overs)	v	Sylhet Thunder; 161 (19.1 overs)
Shane Watson 68 (36); Ebadot Hossain 2/30 (4 overs)		Sherfane Rutherford 60 (37); Mustafizur Rahman 2/18 (3.1 overs)

Rangpur Rangers won by 38 runs
Sylhet International Cricket Stadium, Sylhet
Umpires: David Millns (Eng) and Gazi Sohel (Ban)
Player of the match: Shane Watson (Rangpur Rangers)

- Sylhet Thunder won the toss and elected to field.

4 January 2020
13:20
Scorecard

Khulna Tigers; 121 (19.5 overs)	v	Chattogram Challengers; 124/4 (18.1 overs)
Rilee Rossouw 48 (40); Rubel Hossain 3/17 (3.5 overs)		Junaid Siddique 38 (39); Robert Frylinck 2/20 (4 overs)

Chattogram Challengers won by 6 wickets
Sylhet International Cricket Stadium, Sylhet
Umpires: David Millns (Eng) and Mahfuzur Rahman (Ban)
Player of the match: Mehedi Hasan Rana (Chattogram Challengers)

- Chattogram Challengers won the toss and elected to field.

4 January 2020
18:30 (D/N)
Scorecard

Sylhet Thunder; 143/6 (20 overs)	v	Rajshahi Royals; 145/4 (15.1 overs)
Mohammad Mithun 47 (38); Alok Kapali 2/14 (1 over)		Afif Hossain 46 (30); Delwar Hossain 2/11 (2.1 overs)

Rajshahi Royals won by 6 wickets
Sylhet International Cricket Stadium, Sylhet
Umpires: Tanvir Ahmed (Ban) and Prageeth Rambukwella (SL)
Player of the match: Afif Hossain (Rajshahi Royals)

- Sylhet Thunder won the toss and elected to bat.

=== Phase 5 (Dhaka) ===
7 January 2020
13:20
Scorecard

Sylhet Thunder; 141/5 (20 overs)	v	Cumilla Warriors; 142/5 (19.1 overs)
Abdul Mazid 45 (40); Al-Amin Hossain 2/30 (4 overs)		Dawid Malan 58 (49); Nayeem Hasan 3/21 (4 overs)

Cumilla Warriors won by 5 wickets
Sher-e-Bangla National Cricket Stadium, Dhaka
Umpires: Prageeth Rambukwella (SL) and Gazi Sohel (Ban)
Player of the match: Dawid Malan (Cumilla Warriors)

- Cumilla Warriors won the toss and elected to field.

7 January 2020
18:30 (D/N)
Scorecard

Rajshahi Royals; 166/8 (20 overs)	v	Chattogram Challengers; 170/3 (18.3 overs)
Litton Das 56 (45); Ziaur Rahman 3/18 (3 overs)		Imrul Kayes 67* (41); Farhad Reza 1/17 (2 overs)

Chattogram Challengers won by 7 wickets
Sher-e-Bangla National Cricket Stadium, Dhaka
Umpires: Morshed Ali Khan (Ban) and David Millns (Eng)
Player of the match: Imrul Kayes (Chattogram Challengers)

- Chattogram Challengers won the toss and elected to field.

8 January 2020
13:20
Scorecard

Khulna Tigers; 179/2 (20 overs)	v	Cumilla Warriors; 145 (18.2 overs)
Rilee Rossouw 71* (36); David Wiese 1/30 (3 overs)		Sabbir Rahman 62 (39); Robert Frylinck 5/16 (4 overs)

Khulna Tigers won by 34 runs
Sher-e-Bangla National Cricket Stadium, Dhaka
Umpires: David Millns (Eng) and Gazi Sohel (Ban)
Player of the match: Robert Frylinck (Khulna Tigers)

- Cumilla Warriors won the toss and elected to field.

8 January 2020
18:30 (D/N)
Scorecard

Dhaka Platoon; 145/9 (20 overs)	v	Rangpur Rangers; 84 (15.3 overs)
Tamim Iqbal 40 (38); Taskin Ahmed 3/32 (4 overs)		Al-Amin 23 (22); Mahedi Hasan 3/13 (3.3 overs)

Dhaka Platoon won by 61 runs
Sher-e-Bangla National Cricket Stadium, Dhaka
Umpires: Mahfuzur Rahman (Ban) and Prageeth Rambukwella (SL)
Player of the match: Shadab Khan (Dhaka Platoon)

- Rangpur Rangers won the toss and elected to field.

10 January 2020
14:00
Scorecard

Rangpur Rangers; 149/9 (20 overs)	v	Dhaka Platoon; 138/9 (20 overs)
Lewis Gregory 46 (32); Thisara Perera 3/23 (3 overs)		Tamim Iqbal 34 (33); Junaid Khan 2/22 (4 overs)

Rangpur Rangers won by 11 runs
Sher-e-Bangla National Cricket Stadium, Dhaka
Umpires: Tanvir Ahmed (Ban) and David Millns (Eng)
Player of the match: Lewis Gregory (Rangpur Rangers)

- Dhaka Platoon won the toss and elected to field.

10 January 2020
19:00 (D/N)
Scorecard

Khulna Tigers; 218/2 (20 overs)	v	Cumilla Warriors; 126/9 (20 overs)
Mushfiqur Rahim 98* (57); Mujeeb Ur Rahman 1/18 (4 overs)		Upul Tharanga 32 (23); Shohidul Islam 3/27 (4 overs)

Khulna Tigers won by 92 runs
Sher-e-Bangla National Cricket Stadium, Dhaka
Umpires: Prageeth Rambukwella (SL) and Gazi Sohel (Ban)
Player of the match: Mushfiqur Rahim (Khulna Tigers)

- Cumilla Warriors won the toss and elected to field.

11 January 2020
13:20
Scorecard

Chattogram Challengers; 155/5 (20 overs)	v	Rajshahi Royals; 156/2 (17.4 overs)
Mahmudullah 48* (33); Shoaib Malik 1/11 (3 overs)		Litton Das 75 (48); Ziaur Rahman 1/17 (1.4 overs)

Rajshahi Royals won by 8 wickets
Sher-e-Bangla National Cricket Stadium, Dhaka
Umpires: Tanvir Ahmed (Ban) and Prageeth Rambukwella (SL)
Player of the match: Litton Das (Rajshahi Royals)

- Rajshahi Royals won the toss and elected to field.

11 January 2020
18:30 (D/N)
Scorecard

Dhaka Platoon; 205/4 (20 overs)	v	Khulna Tigers; 207/2 (18.1 overs)
Mominul Haque 91 (59); Robert Frylinck 2/35 (4 overs)		Najmul Hossain Shanto 115* (57); Shadab Khan 1/32 (4 overs)

Khulna Tigers won by 8 wickets
Sher-e-Bangla National Cricket Stadium, Dhaka
Umpires: David Millns (Eng) and Mahfuzur Rahman (Ban)
Player of the match: Najmul Hossain Shanto (Khulna Tigers)

- Khulna Tigers won the toss and elected to field.
- Najmul Hossain Shanto (Khulna Tigers) became the second youngest player to score a century in BPL (21 years 144 days).
- It was the highest successful run chase in the history of BPL.

== Playoffs ==
Semifinals
13 January 2020 — Dhaka
1	Khulna Tigers	158/3 (20 overs)
2	Rajshahi Royals	131 (20 overs)
13 January 2020 — Dhaka
3	Chattogram Challengers	147/3 (17.4 overs)
4	Dhaka Platoon	144/8 (20 overs)

Preliminary final
15 January 2020 — Dhaka
2	Rajshahi Royals	165/8 (19.2 overs)
3	Chattogram Challengers	164/9 (20 overs)

Final
17 January 2020 — Dhaka
1	Khulna Tigers	149/8 (20 overs)
2	Rajshahi Royals	170/4 (20 overs)

=== Eliminator ===
13 January 2020
13:20
Scorecard

Dhaka Platoon; 144/8 (20 overs)	v	Chattogram Challengers; 147/3 (17.4 overs)
Shadab Khan 64* (41); Rayad Emrit 3/23 (4 overs)		Chris Gayle 38 (49); Shadab Khan 2/32 (2.4 overs)

Chattogram Challengers won by 7 wickets
Sher-e-Bangla National Cricket Stadium, Dhaka
Umpires: David Millns (Eng) and Mahfuzur Rahman (Ban)
Player of the match: Rayad Emrit (Chattogram Challengers)

- Chattogram Challengers won the toss and elected to field.

=== Qualifiers ===
Qualifier 1

13 January 2020
18:30 (D/N)
Scorecard

Khulna Tigers; 158/3 (20 overs)	v	Rajshahi Royals; 131 (20 overs)
Najmul Hossain Shanto 78* (57); Mohammad Irfan 2/13 (4 overs)		Shoaib Malik 80 (50); Mohammad Amir 6/17 (4 overs)

Khulna Tigers won by 27 runs
Sher-e-Bangla National Cricket Stadium, Dhaka
Umpires: Prageeth Rambukwella (SL) and Gazi Sohel (Ban)
Player of the match: Mohammad Amir (Khulna Tigers)

- Rajshahi Royals won the toss and elected to field.
- Mohammad Amir (Khulna Tigers) bowled the best bowling figures in the BPL (6/17).

Qualifier 2

15 January 2020
18:30 (D/N)
Scorecard

Chattogram Challengers; 164/9 (20 overs)	v	Rajshahi Royals; 165/8 (19.2 overs)
Chris Gayle 60 (24); Mohammad Nawaz 2/13 (4 overs)		Andre Russell 54* (22); Rubel Hossain 2/32 (4 overs)

Rajshahi Royals won by 2 wickets
Sher-e-Bangla National Cricket Stadium, Dhaka
Umpires: David Millns (Eng) and Mahfuzur Rahman (Ban)
Player of the match: Andre Russell (Rajshahi Royals)

- Rajshahi Royals won the toss and elected to field.

=== Final ===
17 January 2020
19:00 (D/N)
Scorecard

Rajshahi Royals; 170/4 (20 overs)	v	Khulna Tigers; 149/8 (20 overs)
Irfan Sukkur 52 (35); Mohammad Amir 2/35 (4 overs)		Shamsur Rahman 52 (43); Mohammad Irfan 2/18 (4 overs)

Rajshahi Royals won by 21 runs
Sher-e-Bangla National Cricket Stadium, Dhaka
Umpires: David Millns (Eng) and Gazi Sohel (Ban)
Player of the match: Andre Russell (Rajshahi Royals)

- Khulna Tigers won the toss and elected to field.

== Statistics ==
Most runs
Player	Team	Matches	Runs
Rilee Rossouw	Khulna Tigers	14	495
Mushfiqur Rahim	Khulna Tigers	14	491
Litton Das	Rajshahi Royals	15	455
Shoaib Malik	Rajshahi Royals	15	455
Dawid Malan	Cumilla Warriors	11	444

- Source: Cricinfo.com

Most wickets
Player	Team	Matches	Wickets
Mustafizur Rahman	Rangpur Rangers	12	20
Mohammad Amir	Khulna Tigers	13	20
Rubel Hossain	Chattogram Challengers	13	20
Robert Frylinck	Khulna Tigers	14	20
Shohidul Islam	Khulna Tigers	13	19

- Source: Cricinfo.com

Highest team totals
Team	Total	Opponent	Ground	Result
Chattogram Challengers	238/4	Cumilla Warriors	Zohur Ahmed Chowdhury Stadium	Won
Sylhet Thunders	232/5	Khulna Tigers	Zohur Ahmed Chowdhury Stadium	Won
Cumilla Warriors	222/7	Chattogram Challengers	Zohur Ahmed Chowdhury Stadium	Lost

- Source: Cricinfo.com

== See also ==
- Mujib 100 T20 Cup Bangladesh 2020
