= DBL Group =

Conglomerate

- Formation: 1991
- Legal status: Private
- Headquarters: Khulna, Bangladesh
- Region served: Bangladesh
- Official language: Bengali; English
- Founder & CEO: MD. Shinha Sarder
- Website: www.dbl-group.com

DBL Group (Bengali: ডিবিএল গ্রুপ), formerly known as Dulal Brothers Limited, is a Bangladeshi diversified conglomerate based in Dhaka with a focus on the garments industry. The company has received investments from International Finance Corporation, German Investment Corporation, and Swedfund. It has invested to make its factories more green.

== History ==
DBL Group was established in 1991 as Dulal Brothers Limited. The company expanded in 1994 from a single factory under M. A. Jabbar, managing director of DBL Group, who was then a fresh graduate of Computer Science from University of Texas. The company was named after Dulal, brother of M. A. Jabbar, who was killed in 1971 by the Pakistan Army during the Bangladesh War of Independence and is managed by the surviving four brothers and their children. M. A. Rahim Feroz is the vice chairman of DBL Group.

In April 2012, DBL Group signed an agreement with IBCS-PRIMAX Software (Bangladesh) Ltd for automation of certain activities at the company. International Finance Corporation provided funding for DBL Group's dyeing factory, titled Color City, of US$10.5 million in 2014.

DBL Group invested US$100 million in Ethiopia to establish a combined textile and garment factory in 2016. The group received funding from Swedfund and Development Bank of Ethiopia. DBL announced plans to invest US$1.2 billion to establish 19 factories inside DBL Industrial Park in the Srihatta Economic Zone in Sylhet Division.

In 2019, DBL Group became the official franchise of Puma in Bangladesh and established the first store in Dhaka. It manufactures products of Swedish company H&M. In 2020, it had the second largest market share of methocarbamol generic drug in the United States. It evacuated workers from Ethiopia after the outbreak of the Tigray War.

DBL group announced plans to invest US$650 million to establish 10 factories (textiles, ceramics, toiletries, etc.) inside DBL Industrial Park in the Srihatta Economic Zone in Sylhet Division. In October 2021, International Finance Corporation provided US$22.7 million to build a dying and finishing factory called Hamza Textiles Limited. It launched DBL Pharmaceuticals in November.

DBL Group announced plans to invest in Vietnam in April 2022 to establish a sewing thread factory. In October 2022, DBL Group signed an agreement with HSBC for host-to-host integration. Shakib al Hasan is the brand ambassador of DBL Ceramics which makes ceramic tiles. It operates a subsidized grocery store for its employees, one of many textile companies in Bangladesh to do so.

In January 2023, British International Investment signed an agreement with DBL Group to provide US$52 million to finance the construction of Jinnat Textile Mills Limited at DBL Industrial Park in the Srihatta Economic Zone in Sylhet Division. It established the first Puma outlet outside of Dhaka in Chittagong in January.

In April 2017, Neural Semiconductor Limited launched with VLSI Design Centre. The center was officially inaugurated by Professor Dr. Saiful Islam, then vice chancellor of Bangladesh University of Engineering and Technology.

== Subsidiaries ==
- Dulal Brothers Limited
- Jinnat Apparels Limited
- Flamingo Fashions Limited
- Jinnat Fashions Limited
- Jinnat Knitwears Limited
- Mawna Fashions Limited
- Matin Spinning Mills Limited
- Mymun Textiles Limited
- Hamza Textiles Limited
- Color City Limited
- DB Tex Limited
- Thanbee Print World Limited
- Parkway Packaging & Printing Limited
- DBL Distribution Limited
- DBL Ceramics Limited
- Textile Testing Services Limited
- DBL Telecom Limited
- DBL Communications Private Limited
- Glory Textile & Apparels Ltd
- DBTEL
- DBL Sports Limited (owned Chittagong Vikings)
- DBL Dredging Limited
- Color City Limited (eco threads & yarns)
- DBL Pharma
- Neural Semiconductor Limited
