= Dhaka Capitals =

Franchise competing in BPL (Bangladesh Premier League)

- ঢাকা ক্যাপিটালস
- Nickname: Dhakaiya
- League: Bangladesh Premier League

Personnel
- Captain: Mohammad Mithun
- Coach: Toby Radford
- Owner: Champions Sports Ltd. Partnered with Remark HB Limited
- Chief executive: Atik Fahad

Team information
- City: Dhaka, Bangladesh
- Founded: 2012; 14 years ago Dhaka Gladiators (2012-2014); Dhaka Dynamites (2015-2018); Dhaka Platoon (2019-2020); Minister Dhaka (2021); Dhaka Dominators (2022); Durdanto Dhaka (2023); Dhaka Capitals (2024-present)
- Home ground: Sher-e-Bangla National Cricket Stadium, Dhaka
- Official website: dhakacapitals.org
T20I kit

The Dhaka Capitals, also known as Dhaka Franchise, are a professional Twenty20 cricket team based in Dhaka, that competes in the Bangladesh Premier League (BPL). The team was one of the seven debut franchises when the league was established in 2012. The team plays its home matches at the Sher-e-Bangla National Cricket Stadium and is owned by BCB.

The Capitals are one of the most successful BPL franchise, along with Cumilla Victorians, having won three BPL titles under different owners. The team is currently owned by Shakib Khan. Salman F Rahman (Beximco) established this team in 2010 NCL. Europa Group also owned this team and named Dhaka Gladiators in 2012 BPL. They lifted two titles (2012, 2013) as an owner of Dhaka.

Dhaka Capitals are currently captained by Mohammad Mithun. Toby Radford was appointed as head coach of Dhaka Capitals. Shakib Al Hasan is the leading run scorer and the leading wicket taker of the team.

== History ==
=== 2010: Beginning ===
Six teams competed in the first edition of NCL Twenty20 tournament. Each team represented the six administrative divisions of Bangladesh. Six companies bid to buy a team in the tournament. Beximco Group was bid for Dhaka and bought Dhaka Division. Then it was named by Dhaka Dynamites. The companies went into a lottery in which they were to pick one of six "iconic" players from Bangladesh. Mohammad Ashraful was named icon player and captained for Dhaka. Jeewan Mendis and Imran Nazir came to play for the team. Dhaka built a strong team with a mix of experienced and young players and participated in the tournament as a title contender. Rising star Mahmudullah Riyad and experienced players Mohammad Ashraful and Rafique were key players for Dhaka. Dhaka won 5 out of 5 matches in the group stage and advanced to the semi-finals with full points as the league champion. However, they lost to Rajshahi in the semi-finals. And that was Dhaka's only defeat in the entire tournament.

== Home ground ==
Dhaka play their home matches at the Sher-e-Bangla National Cricket Stadium (SBNCS) in Dhaka. The stadium has a seating capacity of approximately 25,000 and regularly hosts domestic and international cricket matches in Bangladesh. It is also referred to as the "Tigers' Den".

== Slogan and theme songs ==
=== Slogans ===
Franchise	Span	Slogan
Dhaka Dynamites	2015–19	Jitbe Dhaka Dekhbe Desh
Dhaka Platoon	2019	Math Kapabe Dhaka
Minister Dhaka	2021	Joyer Jonno Lorai
Dhaka Dominators	2022	Let's Dominate
Durdanto Dhaka	2023	Jitbe Dhaka Parle Theka
Dhaka Capitals	2024–present	Together We Rise

== Rivalries ==
=== Dhaka–Comilla (BPL Clásico) ===
The Dhaka–Comilla rivalry was a cricket rivalry between two franchises, Dhaka Dynamites and Comilla Victorians in the Bangladesh Premier League (BPL), known as the BPL Clásico. They are the two most successful teams in BPL winning a combined 7 titles out of the 10 BPL seasons. Dhaka and Comilla have historically engaged in some of the most iconic clashes in the BPL. It is considered to be the biggest and iconic match in Bangladeshi domestic cricket. Dhaka Capitals and Comilla Victorians produced some intense nail bitting clash. The rivalry started in the era of Dhaka Dynamites in 2015 BPL. Many legendary cricketers have played for both teams. some notable players are Shakib Al Hasan, Tamim Iqbal, Mashrafe Bin Mortaza, Andre Russell, Kieron Pollard, Shahid Afridi, Sunil Narine, Shoaib Malik, Mohammad Nabi etc.

== Captains ==
Captains of Dhaka Franchise
No.	Name	Span	M	W	L	NR
1.	Mohammad Ashraful	2010-13	9	6	3	0
2.	Mashrafe Mortaza	2012-20	34	23	11	0
3.	Mosharraf Hossain	2013	1	1	0	0
4.	Kumar Sangakkara	2015	10	4	6	0
5.	Nasir Hossain	2015-23	13	3	10	0
6.	Shakib Al Hasan	2016-19	43	26	16	1
7.	Mushfiqur Rahim	2020	10	5	5	0
8.	Mahmudullah	2022	10	4	5	1
9.	Mosaddek Hossain	2024	9	1	8	0
10.	Taskin Ahmed	2024	3	0	3	0
11.	Thisara Perera	2025–present	12	3	9	0

Last updated: 4 January 2025

== Squad ==
The squad of Dhaka Capitals for 2025-26 season is:

Name	Nationality	Batting style	Bowling style	Notes
Batters
Saif Hassan	Bangladesh	Right-handed	Right-arm off-break	
Sabbir Rahman	Bangladesh	Right-handed	Right-arm leg-break	
Alex Hales	England	Right-handed	Right-arm medium	Overseas
Zubaid Akbari	Afghanistan	Left-handed	Slow left-arm orthodox	Overseas
Wicket-keepers
Mohammad Mithun	Bangladesh	Right-handed	Right-arm off-break	Captain
Usman Khan	Pakistan	Right-handed	Right-arm off-break	Overseas
Rahmanullah Gurbaz	Afghanistan	Right-handed	—N/a	Overseas
Irfan Shukkur	Bangladesh	Left-handed	—N/a	
All-rounders
Abdullah Al Mamun	Bangladesh	Left-handed	Right-arm medium	
Tofael Ahmed	Bangladesh	Right-handed	Right-arm medium	
Moinul Islam	Bangladesh	Left-handed	Slow left-arm orthodox	
Dasun Shanaka	Sri Lanka	Right-handed	Right-arm medium fast	Overseas
Shamim Hossain	Bangladesh	Left-handed	Right-arm off-break	
Nasir Hossain	Bangladesh	Right-handed	Right-arm off-break	
Mohammad Saifuddin	Bangladesh	Left-handed	Right-arm fast medium	
Imad Wasim	Pakistan	Left-handed	Slow left-arm orthodox	Overseas
Odean Smith	West Indies	Right-handed	Right-arm medium fast	Overseas
Spin bowlers
Taijul Islam	Bangladesh	Left-handed	Slow left-arm orthodox	
Jayed Ullah	Bangladesh	Right-handed	Slow left-arm orthodox	
Pace bowlers
Taskin Ahmed	Bangladesh	Left-handed	Right-arm fast-medium	
Maruf Mridha	Bangladesh	Left-handed	Left-arm fast medium	
Ziaur Rahman	Afghanistan	Right-handed	Right-arm medium fast	Overseas

== Administration and support staff ==
The coaching panel of Dhaka Capitals for the season 2025-26 is:

Name	Position
Toby Radford	Head coach
Shoaib Akhtar	Mentor

== Franchise history ==
Dhaka Franchise was formed in 2009 as one of the participating teams in the National Cricket League Twenty20. The ownership of the team was acquired by Ahmed Shayan Fazlur Rahman's Beximco Group. The league was later replaced with Bangladesh Premier League, with the ownership of the franchise being awarded to Europa Group under the name of Dhaka Gladiators for US$5.05 million. After multiple corruption charges against the owners, the team was re-acquired by Beximco Group in 2015. Later in 2019, Jamuna Bank acquired the team. Afterwards, the team was acquired by Minister Group, Rupa Fabrics Ltd. and Newtex Group respectively each in three years, after 2022. As of now, the current ownership of the team is acquired by Champions Sports Ltd. and partnered with Remark-Herlan Group, of which actor Shakib Khan is a director.

== Season overview ==
=== BPL 01 ===
In the first two seasons, Mashrafe Bin Mortaza captained the team and Ian Pont was the head coach. Dhaka Gladiators started off their campaign disappointingly by losing against an experienced Khulna Royal Bengals which was led by all rounder Shakib Al Hasan. However this was succeeded by three consecutive wins even without players like Shahid Afridi and Saeed Ajmal. During their third victory against Barisal Burners, they made the highest total of the tournament by scoring 208 runs for five wickets. They defended this score, even though Chris Gayle scored a century for the Barisal Burners. Later in the tournament, they failed to chase mediocre targets due to batting collapses. In the final, Dhaka Gladiators beat the Barisal Burners to be crowned champions of BPL 2012.

=== BPL 02 ===
For the 2012/13 season, Dhaka Gladiators bought all-rounder Shakib Al Hasan who was the most expensive player and the captain in the tournament. They bought fast bowler Mashrafe Mortaza, the emerging wicket keeper Anamul Haque and more. They also bought South African pace bowler Alfonso Thomas, and West Indians Kieron Pollard and Chris Gayle who were only available for one game. They bought English players Luke Wright, Owais Shah, Darren Stevens, bowler Chris Liddle and batsman Josh Cobb. This team of players were crowned 2013 champions, just as they had been in 2012. They played 14 games, won 11 and lost only 3. This time their strongest opponent was Sylhet Royals.

=== BPL 03 ===
Dhaka Dynamites was introduced in a new look in 2015. During the player draft, Kumar Sangakkara was selected as the captain while Nasir Hossain was picked as the "icon" player. A total of eighteen players was selected in the draft process. The notable players in and out of the draft they purchased were, Mustafizur Rahman, Yasir Shah, Mohammad Hafeez and Ryan ten Doeschate and Mohammad Irfan

They started off rather smoothly by defeating their arch rival Comilla Victorians and Chittagong Vikings but lost their way through defeats against Rangpur Riders and Barisal Bulls. Luckily, they finished at 4th place out of 6 teams but lost against the Bulls in the eliminator

=== BPL 04 ===
After having an average season at BPL 3, the Dynamites started the fourth season with a strong team including the likes of Shakib Al Hasan, Andre Russell, Dwayne Bravo, Kumar Sangakkara, Mosaddek Hossain, Evin Lewis, Mahela Jayawardene, Wayne Parnell and Ravi Bopara. They started their campaign with winning against Barisal Bulls. On their way, they were only defeated by the Rajshahi Kings and Khulna Titans. They defeated the Titans in the first qualifier and the Kings in the final, being crowned champions for the third time

Dwayne Bravo became the highest wicket taker of the tournament. While Kumar Sangakkara scored most runs for them.

=== BPL 05 ===
The team has signed many new foreign players among whom Shahid Afridi, Shane Watson, Mohammad Amir and Sunil Narine are worth mentioning. They retained Mohammad Shahid, Mosaddek Hossain and Mehedi Maruf from the local category while they retained Kumar Sangakkara, Evin Lewis and Ronsford Beaton from the overseas department. They also extended the contract of ace all-rounder Shakib Al Hasan as their icon player.

They got the second pick in the local and overseas pick in the draft, choosing pacer Abu Hider and English batsman Joe Denly respectively. Their surprise picks were pacers Khaled Ahmed, Mohammad Saddam, batsman Shadman Islam and little-known West Indian orthodox spinner Akeal Hosein.

Dhaka Dynamites had a shaky start with a surprise defeat to Sylhet Sixers. However, the team soon bounced back and finished 2nd in the league stage. They crushed their biggest rival Comilla Victorians in Qualifier-1, hence advancing to the final. They didn't manage the defend the title as they suffered a heave defeat to Rangpur Riders in the final who were eventually crowned the champions, securing their maiden trophy.

=== BPL 06 ===
All the franchises were given until 30 September 2018 to submit their 4 retained cricketers. Dhaka Dynamites retained Shakib Al Hasan, Kieron Pollard, Sunil Narine and Rovman Powell. All Franchises were also allowed to buy 2 foreign players pre-draft but they can't be the ones who played for the team last season. Dhaka Dynamites bought Afghan hard-hitter Hazratullah Zazai and Caribbean all-rounder Andre Russell.

In the draft, Dhaka's first pick was local fast bowler Rubel Hossain. They signed South African bowler Andrew Birch and English batsman Ian Bell as their overseas players in draft. They ended up signing 10 local players in the draft.

In the tournament Dhaka had a flying start winning five matches out of their first six matches. But they suddenly lost their momentum and suffered five consecutive defeats and eventually pipped Rajshahi Kings out of top four by winning their last group match and qualified for Eliminator. In the Eliminator they defeated Chittagong Vikings and defeated Rangpur Riders in the Qualifier 2 to seal their place in the Final. In the final Comilla Victorians set a target of 200 for Dhaka, but they fell short by 17 runs in their chase and Comilla won the tournament for the second time.

Shakib Al Hasan was the highest wicket taker of the season and won the Player of the Tournament for his all-round performances.

=== BPL 07 ===
The franchise had signed English ODI captain Eoin Morgan who is the winning captain of ICC Cricket World Cup 2019 and South African explosive batsman David Miller as their two direct signings.

However, during the player's direct signing period, a conflict of interest arose between BCB and all other franchises. Subsequently, in September 2019, BCB made some changes in the rules and regulations for the season. Eliminating all franchises, BCB took over charge of the current BPL and decided to run the tournament by the itself, renaming the tournament as the Bangabandhu BPL T20 2019 in order to pay homage to Sheikh Mujibur Rahman on his birth centenary. Jamuna Bank acquired the team's sponsorship rights. The team was renamed for as Dhaka Platoon and signed the likes of Tamim Iqbal, Mashrafe Mortaza, Shahid Afridi, Thisara Perera and Wahab Riaz.

=== BPL 09 ===
In November 2022, the team changed its name to Dhaka Dominators after Rupa Fabrics Ltd took over the ownership of the franchise.

=== BPL 10 ===
In October 2023, the team changed its name to Durdanto Dhaka after Newtex Group took over the ownership. The team debuted in 2024 Bangladesh Premier League with a new look. The team's iconic Player was Taskin Ahmed. Direct Signing players include Mosaddek Hossain, Shoriful Islam as well as Naim Sheikh. Overseas Players include Saim Ayub, Alex Ross, Usman Qadir, Gulbadin Naib, Sean Williams, Adam Rossington and Sadeera Samarawickrama. However, the team suffered from heavy defeats throughout the tournament by just winning a single game in their opening match against their arch rival Comilla Victorians in BPL Clasico and enduring 11 consecutive losses.

=== BPL 11 ===
The Dhaka Capitals franchise had accumulated immense hype and enthusiasm under the new ownership of megastar Shakib Khan. A theme song was also uploaded on its social media platforms featuring numerous celebrities and cricketers.

However, the team failed to leave up to its hype and had a disappointing campaign by just securing three wins and incurring eight losses.

The squad consisted of popular local players such as Litton Das, Mustafizur Rahman and Tanzid Hasan. Its overseas collection included well-known players such as Johnson Charles, Saim Ayub, Thisara Perera, Amir Hamza, Jason Roy and Stephen Eskinazi.

== Seasons ==
=== Bangladesh Premier League ===
Year	League standing	Final standing
2012	3rd out of 6	Champions
2013	1st out of 7	Champions
2015	4th out of 6	Playoffs
2016	1st out of 7	Champions
2017	2nd out of 7	Runners-up
2019	4th out of 7	Runners-up
2019-20	4th out of 7	Playoffs
2022	5th out of 6	League stage
2023	6th out of 7	League stage
2024	7th out of 7	League stage
2025	6th out of 7	League stage

=== Bangabandhu T20 Cup ===
Year	League standing	Final standing
2020	3rd out of 5	Qualifier 2

=== NCL T20 (Franchise version) ===
Year	League standing	Final standing
2010	1st out of 6	Semi-final

== Statistics ==
Opposition	Span	M	W	L	NR	Win (%)
Comilla Victorians	2015–2024	18	8	9	1	47.22%
Chattogram Royals	2012–present	30	12	17	1	40.00%
Rangpur Riders	2013–present	21	8	13	0	38.10%
Rajshahi Warriors	2012–present	19	10	9	0	52.53%
Fortune Barishal	2012–2025	21	10	11	0	47.62%
Khulna Tigers	2012–2025	24	13	11	0	54.17%
Sylhet Titans	2012–present	23	12	11	0	52.17%
Noakhali Express	2025–present	2	1	1	0	50.00%
Total	2012–present	158	74	82	2	41.57%

Last updated: January 2026

=== Most runs ===
Player	Match	Runs
Shakib Al Hasan	54	1067
Nasir Hossain	45	912
Kumar Sangakkara	27	827
Tamim Iqbal	21	803
Anamul Haque	39	730
Mohammad Ashraful	26	654

=== Most Wickets ===
Player	Match	Wickets
Shakib Al Hasan	54	73
Rubel Hossain	33	39
Mosharraf Hossain	29	36
Mashrafee Mortaza	39	30
Sunil Narine	27	29
Andre Russell	26	27

== Season overall and top scorer ==
Tournament	Year	Rank	Final standing	MP	W	L	NR	Pts	Top Runs Scorer	Orange Cap	Top Wicket Taker	Purple Cap
NCL	2010	1	Semi-final	6	5	1	0	10	Shamsur Rahman(154 runs)	—	Ashraful & Rafique(10 wickets)	—
BPL	2012	3	Champion	12	7	5	0	10	Imran Nazir(390 runs)	—	Ellias Sunny(17 wickets)	†
BPL	2013	1	Champion	14	11	3	0	18	Mohammad Ashraful(358 runs)	—	Alfonso Thomas(20 wickets)	†
BPL	2015	4	Playoffs	11	4	7	0	8	Kumar Sangakkara(349 runs)	†	Mosharraf Hossain(16 wickets)	—
BPL	2016	1	Champion	14	10	4	0	16	Kumar Sangakkara(370 runs)	—	DJ Bravo(21 wickets)	†
BPL	2017	2	Runners-up	14	8	5	1	15	Evin Lewis(396 runs)	—	Shakib Al Hasan(22 wickets)	†
BPL	2018	4	Runners-up	15	8	7	0	12	Rony Talukder(317 runs)	—	Shakib Al Hasan(23 wickets)	†
BPL	2019	4	Playoffs	13	7	6	0	14	Tamim Iqbal(396 runs)	—	Mahedi Hasan(12 wickets)	—
Bangabandu T20 Cup	2020	3	Qualifier 2	10	5	5	0	5	Yasir Ali(294 runs)	—	Muktar Ali(17 wickets)	—
BPL	2022	5	League Stage	10	4	5	1	9	Tamim Iqbal(407 runs)	—	Andre Russell(8 wickets)	—
BPL	2023	6	League Stage	12	3	9	0	6	Nasir Hossain(366 runs)	—	Nasir Hossain(16 wickets)	—
BPL	2024	7	League Stage	12	1	11	0	2	Alex Ross(352 runs)	—	Shoriful Islam(22 wickets)	†
BPL	2025	6	League Stage	12	3	9	0	6	Tanzid Hasan(485)	—	Mustafizur Rahman(13 wickets)	—
	—	—	Total	148	71	75	2	121	—	—	—	—

† Orange/Purple Cap holder.
