= Chattogram Royals =

Franchise competing in BPL (Bangladesh Premier League)

- চট্টগ্রাম রয়েলস্
- League: Bangladesh Premier League

Personnel
- Captain: Mahedi Hasan
- Coach: Mizanur Rahman Babul
- Owner: Bangladesh Cricket Board
- Manager: Nafees Iqbal

Team information
- City: Chattogram, Bangladesh
- Founded: 2012; 14 years ago Chittagong Kings (2012-2014 & 2025); Chittagong Vikings (2015-2018); Chattogram Challengers (2019-2024); Chattogram Royals (2026)
- Home ground: Bir Shrestho Flight Lieutenant Matiur Rahman Cricket Stadium, Chattogram

History
- Bangladesh Premier League wins: 0 (Runner-up 2013, 2025, 2026)
- Official website: chattogramroyals.com

Chattogram Royals (Bengali: চট্টগ্রাম রয়েলস্) is a professional franchise cricket team that competes in the Bangladesh Premier League (BPL). They represent Chattogram Division. The team plays their home matches at the Bir Shrestha Shahid Flight Lieutenant Motiur Rahman Cricket Stadium. Since the inception of the Bangladesh Premier League (BPL) in 2012, a Chattogram-based franchise has competed in every edition. The current team known as Chattogram Royals established under its present name in 2025 bears no direct continuity with the old Chattogram teams franchise.

== Franchise history ==
The Chattogram franchise joined the BPL as one of its original members in 2012, which was owned by SQ Sports. After SQ Sports was charged with fixing and delaying payments to players, it was banned from participating in cricketing activities, so were all the other franchisees owners for corruption scandals. It appeared in the final in 2013 under the captaincy of Mahmudullah Riyad and the coaching of Khaled Mahmud. The team changed its name from Chittagong Kings after a change of ownership in 2015, and Chittagong Vikings was founded 1 December 2015. It was owned by DBL Sports Limited, a concern of DBL Group.

DBL Sports Limited terminated the ownership of the team on 29 July 2019. Then Bangladesh Cricket Board (BCB) changed the format of the tournament and acquired ownership for all the teams for the 2019–20 season.

In 2019, Akhtar Group acquired the team and renamed it as Chattogram Challengers. There were allegations on this franchise for not paying fees to the players.

In 2024, SQ Sports reacquired the team, reverting to the team's old name.

In 2025, the ownership was taken by Triangle Sports and the team was named Chattogram Royals for 2025–26 season. But on 25 December 2025, Triangle Sports terminated the ownership of Chattogram Royals, and the Bangladesh Cricket Board took charge.

== Season history ==
=== BPL 01 ===
In the inaugural season, Chittagong Kings had a strong squad with the likes of Mahmudullah Riyad, Dwayne Bravo, Kevon Cooper and Jason Roy. Despite having a strong squad on paper, the Kings failed to showcase their full potential, being disqualified controversially as Barisal Burners were the ones who went through to the knockout stage. The team management were very unhappy with the decision, as their disqualification was announced at 2 am on the day of the knockout match.

=== BPL 02 ===
The team retained Mahmudullah and Jason Roy while they gained some reinforcements in the likes of David Miller and Ryan ten Doeschate. This time, the team performed really well, winning their first three games in a row and advancing to the playoffs. They reached the finals but couldn't lift the trophy as Dhaka Gladiators successfully defended their championship.

=== BPL 03 ===
Chittagong Vikings emerged as the new representative team of the port city in the BPL, under a new name and ownership of DBL Group. They team selected Tamim Iqbal as their icon player and had some overseas players such as Mohammad Amir, who returned after a 5-year ban for fixing, Tillakaratne Dilshan, the Akmal brothers and South African spinner Robin Peterson.

In the field, the Vikings weren't at their best while their pacer, Amir was with the ball. They finished at the bottom of the table, unable to advance through to the knockouts.

=== BPL 04 ===
The Vikings retained Tamim Iqbal as an icon player, while they signed some big names such as Chris Gayle and Shoaib Malik

The team performed consistently throughout the season, earning a spot in the playoffs but losing to the newcomers Rajshahi Kings in the eliminator.

=== BPL 05 ===
The Vikings didn't boast the strongest squad on paper. They had Soumya Sarkar as their icon player and had signed Luke Ronchi, Sikandar Raza, Najibullah Zadran and more. The team was initially led by Misbah-ul-Haq but Ronchi took over after he was dropped due to poor form.

On the field, Ronchi carried the team with the bat and Raza supported throughout the middle. Local players underperformed which cost them heavily. The finished at the bottom, registering only three wins on their belt.

=== BPL 06 ===
The team didn't want to participate in the BPL this time but they were requested by the BPL Governing Council. They team retained Ronchi, Raza and Sunzamul Islam

The team didn't have an A+ (icon) until minutes before the commencement of the draft. Mushfiqur Rahim was the only A+ player without a team. The highest price for an icon 60 lacs Taka ($75,000) while Mushfiqur demanded 1 Croce 20 lacs Taka ($150,000). The Vikings management offered a maximum price of maximum 80 lacs Taka ($100,000). After some negotiations with the Vikings team management, Mushfiqur and the BPL Governing Council, Mushfiq agreed to join the Vikings fleet as their A+ player.

In the draft, the Vikings were very active, signing the likes of Cameron Delport, Dasun Shanaka and Najibullah Zadran. Mosaddek Hossain, Abu Jayed and Khaled Ahmed were a part of their local signings. However, their signing of Mohammad Ashraful, returning to professional cricket after serving a 5-year ban for fixing, made headlines.

The Vikings started off strong early on but gradually slipped as the tournament progressed. The finished 4th on the points table and lost to the Dhaka Dynamites in the Eliminator.

=== BPL 07 ===
During the player's direct signing period, a Conflict of Interests aroused between the BCB and all other franchises. Subsequently, in September 2019, the BCB made some changes in rules and regulations for this season and eliminating all franchises, the BCB took charge of that season's BPL and decided to run the tournament by themselves, naming it the Bangabandhu BPL T20 2019-20 in order to pay homage to Sheikh Mujibur Rahman on his birth centenary. The team was owned and managed by the BCB.

Akhtar Group acquired sponsorship rights of Chittagong and named the team ‘Chattogram Challengers’. They signed the likes of Chris Gayle and Mahmudullah Riyad; this time they performed well in group stage, winning eight matches and losing four.

=== BPL 08 ===
After a year break due to COVID-19 pandemic, the eighth edition of the BPL was scheduled to be played from 21 January to 18 February 2022. In this edition, Delta Sports joined Akhtar Group as the franchise owner. Before the drafts the franchise recruited left-arm spinner Nasum Ahmed and three foreign players Benny Howell, Kennar Lewis and Will Jacks as their direct signing.

=== BPL 09 ===
The Challengers had a relatively poor campaign in the 2023 Bangladesh Premier League, winning only 3 of their 12 games and losing 9, led by captain Ziaur Rahman and star players included Afif Hossain and Curtis Campher.

=== BPL 10 ===
The Chattogram Challengers opened its campaign against the Sylhet Strikers. The game was played on 19 January, which ended in Chattogram Challengers emerging victorious by 7 wickets, sealing a win in the opening match of the 2024 Bangladesh Premier League. Overseas Players include Avishka Fernando, Bilal Khan, Curtis Campher, Josh Brown, Tom Bruce and Romario Shepherd.

=== BPL 11 ===
The newly revived Chittagong Kings went on to become the runners-up of the 2025 Bangladesh Premier League.

The squad consisted of local stars including Shoriful Islam and Shamim Hossain and also featured notable overseas cricketers such as Moeen Ali, Angelo Mathews, Graham Clarke, Mohammad Wasim Jr. and Binura Fernando.

However, the team owner, Sameer Quader Chowdhury elicited huge controversies after several allegations were made against him and the team management by prominent cricketers such as team mentor Shahid Afridi and top order batsman Parvez Hossain Emon as well as team host Yesha Sagar regarding payment delays.

=== BPL 12 ===
The franchise for Chattogram for the 12th edition of the Bangladesh Premier League has been acquired by Triangle Sports, and has been rebranded to Chattogram Royals. but later BCB took the ownership of this team as Triangle Sports signed off.

The squad currently consists of local talents with the likes of Mahedi Hasan who is also the captain of this team as well as Shoriful Islam. Other notable players include Ziaur Rahman, Naim Sheikh who was bought at a price of 1.10 crores from the auction, and Mukidul Islam.

Overseas players include the likes of Mirza Tahir Baig, Cameron Delport, Adam Rossington, Kamran Ghulam and Asif Ali.

== Seasons ==
=== Bangladesh Premier League ===
Year	League standing	Final standing
2012	5th out of 6	League stage
2013	2nd out of 7	Runners-up
2015	6th out of 6	League stage
2016	3rd out of 7	Playoffs
2017	7th out of 7	League stage
2019	3rd out of 7	Playoffs
2019–20	3rd out of 7	Playoffs
2022	3rd out of 6	Playoffs
2023	7th out of 7	League stage
2024	4th out of 7	Playoffs
2025	2nd out of 7	Runners-up
2026	2nd out of 6	Runners-up

== Current squad ==
The squad of Chattogram Royals for 2025–26 season is:

Name	Nationality	Batting style	Bowling style	Notes
Batters
Mohammad Naim	Bangladesh	Left-handed	—N/a	
Shadman Islam	Bangladesh	Left-handed	—N/a	
Mahmudul Hasan Joy	Bangladesh	Right-handed	Right-arm off-break	—N/a
Mahfijul Islam	Bangladesh	Right-handed	Right-arm leg-break	—N/a
Wicket-keepers
Masood Gurbaz	Afghanistan	Right hand Bat	—N/a	Overseas
Zahiduzzaman	Bangladesh	Left-handed	—N/a	
Adam Rossington	England	Right-handed		Overseas
All-rounders
Mahedi Hasan	Bangladesh	Right-handed	Right-arm off-break	Captain
Shuvagata Hom	Bangladesh	Right-handed	Right-arm off-break	—N/a
Abu Hider	Bangladesh	Right-handed	Left-arm medium fast	—N/a
Salman Hossain	Bangladesh	Right-handed	Right-arm medium fast	—N/a
Kamran Ghulam	Pakistan	Right-handed	Slow left-arm orthodox	Overseas
Hassan Nawaz	Pakistan	Right-handed	Right arm Medium	Overseas
Asif Ali	Pakistan	Right-handed	Right arm offbreak	Overseas
Aamir Jamal	Pakistan	Right-handed	Right arm Medium Fast	Overseas
Pace bowlers
Shoriful Islam	Bangladesh	Left-handed	Left-arm medium fast	—N/a
Mukidul Islam	Bangladesh	Right-handed	Right-arm medium fast	—N/a
Sumon Khan	Bangladesh	Left-handed	Right-arm medium	—N/a
Ziaur Rahman	Bangladesh	Right-handed	Right-arm medium fast	—N/a
Spin bowlers
Tanvir Islam	Bangladesh	Left-handed	Slow left-arm orthodox	—N/a
Arafat Sunny	Bangladesh	Left-handed	Slow left-arm orthodox	—N/a

== Coaching staff ==
The coaching panel of Chattogram Royals for the season 2025-26:

Name	Role
Mizanur Rahman Babul	Head coach
Tushar Imran	Batting coach and mentor
Nafees Iqbal	Team manager
