= Rajshahi Warriors =

Franchise competing in BPL (Bangladesh Premier League)

- Nickname: Yellow Army
- League: Bangladesh Premier League

Personnel
- Captain: Najmul Hossain Shanto (2025–26)
- Coach: Hannan Sarkar (2025–26)
- Owner: Nabil Group of Industries (2025–26)
- Manager: Rajin Saleh (2025–26)

Team information
- City: Rajshahi, Bangladesh
- Colors: Yellow, Orange
- Founded: 2012 (as Duronto Rajshahi); 2016 (as Rajshahi Kings); 2019 (as Rajshahi Royals); 2024 (as Durbar Rajshahi); 2025 (as Rajshahi Warriors)
- Home ground: Shaheed Qamaruzzaman Stadium

History
- Bangladesh Premier League wins: 2 (2020, 2026)
T20I kit

Rajshahi Warriors (Bengali: রাজশাহী ওয়ারিয়র্স) is a Bangladeshi franchise Twenty20 cricket team. The team is based in Rajshahi in Bangladesh and competes in the Bangladesh Premier League (BPL), a Twenty20 franchise cricket competition.

The team is currently owned by the Nabil Group of Industries for the 2025–26 Bangladesh Premier League.

== History ==
Duronto Rajshahi participated in the first two seasons of the BPL in 2012 and 2013.

Following the suspension of all BPL franchises after the second season of the league, the Rajshahi Kings were formed ahead of the 2016 BPL following a complete change in the team ownership and management. They competed in the fourth edition of the BPL in late 2016, losing in the final to the Dhaka Dynamites. They also played the fifth and sixth edition of BPL in 2017 and 2019 respectively.

On 16 November 2019, Bengal Group was named as the sponsor of the team and it was renamed to Rajshahi Royals. Rajshahi Royals became the champion of 2019–20 Bangladesh Premier League.

After that, the team was excluded from Bangladesh Premier League till 2024.

In 2024, the team was acquired by Valentine Group and renamed as Durbar Rajshahi. In that season, they finished at 5th place.

In 2025, Nabil Group of Industries acquired this team for the next five years and renamed it as Rajshahi Warriors.

== Season overview ==
=== 2012 ===
Duronto Rajshahi was captained by Mushfiqur Rahim and had the likes of Marlon Samuels, Sabbir Rahman and Mohammad Sami by his team. The team dominated during the league stage, winning 7 of their 10 games, finished at the top of the leaderboard. However, they lost to Barisal Burners in the semi-final, ending a positive campaign.

=== 2013 ===
This time, the team was led by Tamim Iqbal who had the likes of Moeen Ali and Sean Ervine accompanying him. This time, Rajshahi just managed to finish in the top 4 during the league stage, winning 5 games out of 12 matches. Their campaign ended as they were disqualified during the playoffs.

=== 2016 ===
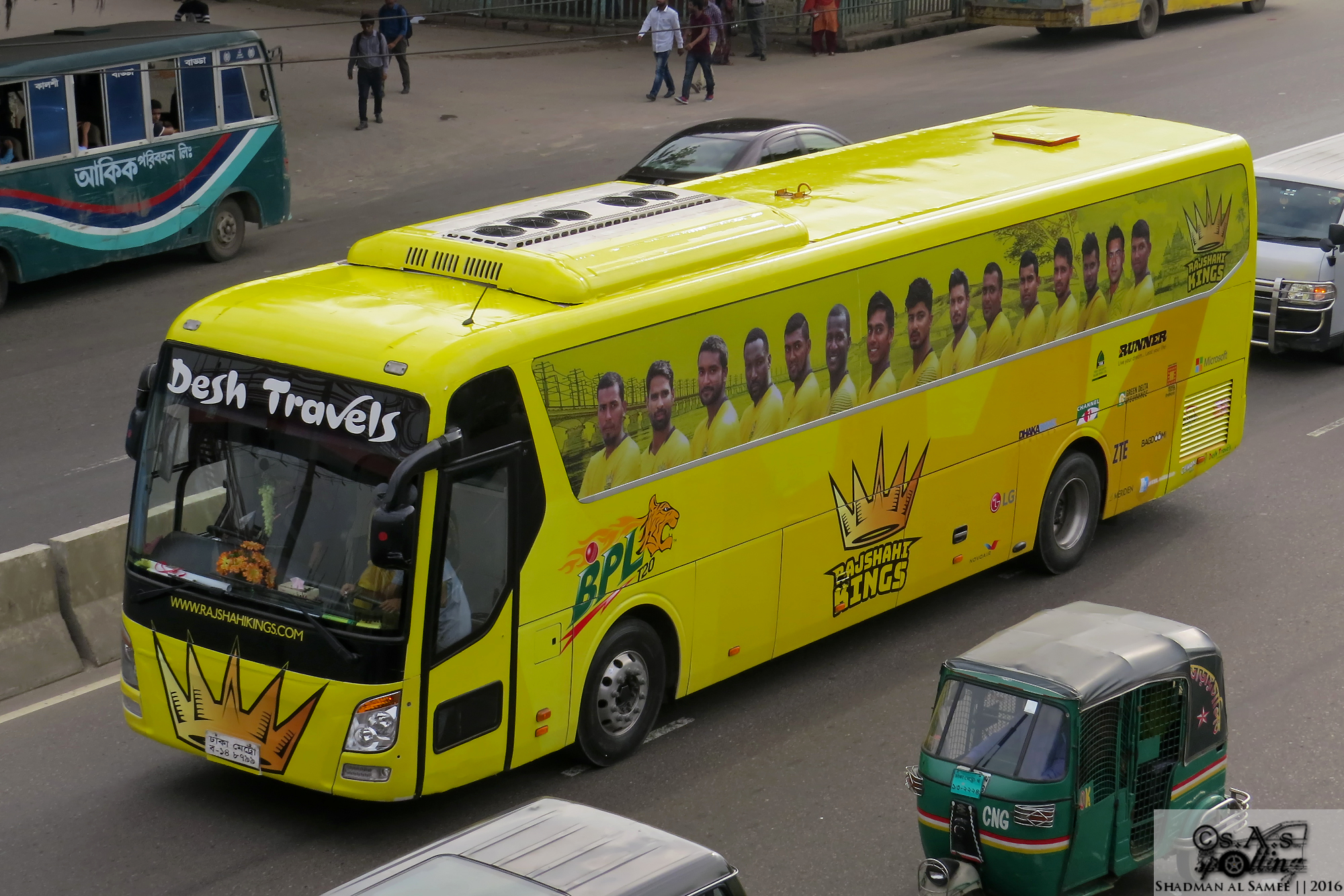
Airport Road 2016: As is evident, the Rajshahi Kings coach for Bangladesh Premier League (BPL) 2016.

The kings were the other new team alongside Khulna Titans participating this year. They signed Mohammad Sami and Darren Sammy (who was, later on, made the skipper) pre-draft. As they were one of the new teams, the kings were allowed to select two local cricketers in the draft before the initial procedure. They selected Mehedi Hasan and Nurul Hasan. They signed Sri Lankan opener Upul Tharanga (missed whole tournament due to national commitments), English all-rounder Samit Patel and more from the overseas department in the draft. They bought Mominul Haque, Farhad Reza and some more local talents also from the draft. They also signed Kiwi all-rounder James Franklin and Jamaican seamer Kesrick Williams mid-tournament. They chose Sabbir Rahman as their icon player.

The kings started off with a 3 run defeat to Khulna Titans and lost to Barisal Bulls (Sabbir 122) in a nail-biting finish. They notched up crucial victories against Dhaka Dynamites (did so twice) and Khulna Titans to qualify for the playoffs.

They won against Chittagong Vikings and Khulna Titans in the eliminator and the 2nd qualifier game respectively. Unfortunately, the suffered a heavy defeat against Dhaka Dynamites in the final.

=== 2017 ===
They replaced previous icon Sabbir Rahman with wicket-keeper batsman Mushfiqur Rahim as the icon player and retained Mominul Haque, Farhad Reza and Mehedi Hasan. They signed English opener and part-time seamer Luke Wright and West Indian top-middle order batsmen Lendl Simmons to provide stability to the top order and also made a one-season contract with Zimbabwe's Malcolm Waller to give the lower-middle order a boost. They extended the contract for one more year with Franklin, Sami and Sammy (remade skipper).

In the draft, The Kings got the first pick in the lottery and unsurprisingly selected wiry left-arm seamer Mustafizur Rahman. They were riding their luck as they also gained the first pick in the overseas selection in the draft, picking Pakistani leggie Usama Mir. The surprise picks were U19 all-rounder Qazi Onik, in-form orthodox spinner Nihaduzzaman, pacer Hossain Ali and little known Pakistani all-rounder Raza Ali Dar.

The Kings began their conquest with a lost to Rangpur Riders and could not fully recover from the early defeat. They went on to lose more matches but secured some victories on the way. Overall, they finished 2nd last at 6th.

=== 2019 ===
They retained Mominul Haque, Zakir Hasan, Mehedi Hasan, Mustafizur Rahman and Mohammad Sami. They signed Afghan leg-spinner Qais Ahmad and South African Christiaan Jonker pre-draft

In the draft, Rajshahi snatched in-form batsman Soumya Sarkar as their first pick. From the overseas department, they signed the likes of Isuru Udana and Ryan ten Doeschate. Their head coach Lance Klusener was present in the event.

=== 2019–20 ===
The team signed South African Al-rounder JP Duminy as one of their direct signings. But later, BCB decided to run this edition of the BPL themselves without taking any franchises, which meant the new signing could not represent this team on this edition of the tournament.

However, during the player's direct signing period, a Conflict of Interests aroused between BCB and all other franchise. Subsequently, in September 2019, BCB made some changes in rules and regulations for this season and eliminating all franchises, BCB took over the charge of the current BPL and decided to run this current tournament by the board itself and named the tournament as Bangabandhu BPL T20 2019 in order to pay homage to Sheikh Mujibur Rahman on his birth centenary. IPC Group became the team sponsor. They renamed it to Rajshahi Royals. In November 2019, post players draft, Shoaib Malik and Andre Russell were included in Rajshahi Royals team in the 2019-20 Bangladesh Premier League.

Rajshahi Royals was the champion of the Bangladesh Premier League 2019–20 Season.

=== 2024–25 ===
Under a new franchise, the team was initially considered weak.

They only signed Anamul Haque Bijoy as a direct pick before player draft.

In the player draft, they brought in Saad Nasim from Pakistan and Lahiru Samarakoon from Sri Lanka as their foreign recruits. Overall, the team signed 12 players from the draft, with Taskin Ahmed standing out as the most iconic signing. Other notable names included U19 World Cup winner Akbar Ali and Jishan Alam. They also secured the services of experienced internationals Yasir Ali and Shafiul Islam.

Following the draft, the team added a speedster Mrittunjoy Chowdhury and a seasoned spinner Shohag Gazi to the team. On top of that, they signed some noteworthy foreign players, including Ryan Burl and Mohammad Haris.

The team has beaten Khulna Tigers, Dhaka Capitals, and Sylhet Strikers so far. Most surprisingly, they defeated the current GSL champion and 13-match unbeaten Rangpur Riders in both legs.

Durbar Rajshahi was a strong contender for the play-off (top 4), but because of their low NRR, they finished in 5th place in the point table.

== Rivalries ==
=== North Bengal Derby ===
The Rajshahi-Rangpur rivalry is a cricket rivalry between two franchises, the Rajshahi Warriors and the Rangpur Riders, in the Bangladesh Premier League. This rivalry is often referred to as the "North Bengal Derby". Both teams have won the BPL trophy once. Rajshahi has reached the playoffs a total of four times, while Rangpur has also made it to the playoffs four times.

=== East-West Derby ===
The East-West Derby, also known as the "Padma-Karnaphuli Derby", is a cricket rivalry in the Bangladesh Premier League between Rajshahi Warriors and Chattogram Royals. Rajshahi has won the BPL once, finished as runners-up once, and qualified for the playoffs a total of four times. On the other hand, Chittagong are yet to win the BPL, but they have finished as runners-up once and reached the playoffs a total of five times.

== Squad ==
The Rajshahi Warriors squad for the season 2025–26 is:

Name	Nationality	Batting style	Bowling style	Notes
Batters
Nazmul Hossain Shanto	Bangladesh	Left-handed	Right-arm off-break	Captain
Tanzid Hasan	Bangladesh	Left-handed	—N/a	
Kane Williamson	New Zealand	Right-handed	—N/a	Overseas
Pathum Nissanka	Sri Lanka	Right-handed	—N/a	Overseas
Sahibzada Farhan	Pakistan	Right-handed	—N/a	Overseas
Yasir Ali	Bangladesh	Right-handed	—N/a	
Wicket-keepers
Mushfiqur Rahim	Bangladesh	Right-handed	—N/a	
Akbar Ali	Bangladesh	Right-handed	—N/a	
Shakhir Hossain	Bangladesh	Right-handed	—N/a	
All rounders
Jishan Alam	Bangladesh	Right-handed	Right-arm off-break	—N/a
SM Meherob	Bangladesh	Left-handed	Right-arm off-break	—N/a
Mohammad Nawaz	Pakistan	Left-handed	Slow left-arm orthodox	Overseas
Dushan Hemantha	Sri Lanka	Right-handed	Right-arm leg-break	Overseas
Hussain Talat	Pakistan	Left-handed	Right-arm medium fast	Overseas
Jahandad Khan	Pakistan	Left-handed	Left-arm medium fast	Overseas
Jimmy Neesham	New Zealand	Left-handed	Right-arm medium fast	Overseas
Ryan Burl	Zimbabwe	Left-handed	Right-arm leg break	Overseas
Wasi Siddiquee	Bangladesh	Left-handed	Right-arm leg-break	—N/a
Spin bowlers
Hasan Murad	Bangladesh	Right-handed	Slow left-arm orthodox	—N/a
MD Rubel	Bangladesh	Right-handed	Right-arm off-break	—N/a
Sandeep Lamichhane	Nepal	Right-handed	Right-arm leg-break	Overseas
Pace bowlers
Binura Fernando	Sri Lanka	Right-handed	Left-arm medium fast	Overseas
Tanzim Hasan Sakib	Bangladesh	Right-handed	Right-arm medium fast	—N/a
Ripon Mondol	Bangladesh	Right-handed	Right-arm medium fast	—N/a
Abdul Gaffar Saqlain	Bangladesh	Right-handed	Right-arm medium fast	—N/a
Robiul Haque	Bangladesh	Right-handed	Right-arm medium fast	—N/a

== Coaching staff ==
The coaching panel of Rajshahi Warriors for the season 2025-26 is:

Name	Role
Hannan Sarkar	Head coach
Rajin Saleh	Assistant Coach
Hasanuzzaman Jhoru	Team Manager
Srivathsan P B	Performance Analyst
Tareq Aziz	Bowling Coach
Iftekharul Islam	Trainer
Muzadded Sany	Physio

== Seasons ==
Year	League standing	Final standing
2012	1st out of 6	Semi-finals
2013	4th out of 7	Playoffs
2015	Did not participate	
2016	4th out of 7	Runners-up
2017	6th out of 7	League stage
2019	5th out of 7	League stage
2019–20	2nd out of 7	Champions
2022	Did Not Participate	
2023	Did Not Participate	
2024	Did Not Participate	
2025	5th out of 7	League stage
2026	1st out of 6	Champions
