= Graham Clarke (Australian cricketer) =

Australian cricketer

Personal information
- Born: 10 July 1939; Laura, South Australia
- Died: 21 January 2006 (aged 66); Nailsworth, South Australia
- Source: Cricinfo, 4 June 2018

Graham Clarke (10 July 1939 – 21 January 2006) was an Australian cricketer. He played six first-class matches for South Australia between 1965 and 1971.

== See also ==
- List of South Australian representative cricketers
