= Tanvir Islam =

Bangladeshi cricketer (born 1996)

Personal information
- Full name: Tanvir Islam
- Born: 25 October 1996 (age 30); Wazirpur,Barisal, Bangladesh
- Batting: Left-handed
- Bowling: Slow left-arm orthodox
- Role: Bowler

International information
- National side: Bangladesh (2023–present)
- ODI debut (cap 152): 2 July 2025 v Sri Lanka
- Last ODI: 9th June 2026 v Australia
- T20I debut (cap 79): 14 March 2023 v England
- Last T20I: 19 May 2025 v United Arab Emirates

Domestic team information
- Years: Team
- 2017–present: Barishal Division
- 2017–2020: Khulna Tigers
- 2021–2024: Comilla Victorians
- 2025–: Fortune Barishal

Career statistics
| Competition | ODI | T20I | FC | LA |
|---|---|---|---|---|
| Matches | 9 | 6 | 48 | 121 |
| Runs scored | 42 | 12 | 739 | 214 |
| Batting average | 7.00 | 12.00 | 13.43 | 7.37 |
| 100s/50s | 0/0 | 0/0 | 0/3 | 0/0 |
| Top score | 11 | 8 | 64* | 20* |
| Balls bowled | 528 | 102 | 9,335 | 6,324 |
| Wickets | 16 | 4 | 168 | 181 |
| Bowling average | 23.18 | 34.00 | 26.16 | 24.69 |
| 5 wickets in innings | 1 | 0 | 8 | 3 |
| 10 wickets in match | 0 | 0 | 1 | 0 |
| Best bowling | 5/39 | 1/17 | 8/51 | 6/18 |
| Catches/stumpings | 3/– | 1/– | 20/– | 46/– |
Medal record
Men's cricket
Representing Bangladesh
South Asian Games
| Gold medal – first place | 2019 Kathmandu/Pokhara | Team |
- Source: Cricinfo, 11 December 2025

Tanvir Islam (born 25 October 1996) is a Bangladeshi cricketer. He made his List A debut for Khelaghar Samaj Kallyan Samity in the 2016–17 Dhaka Premier Division Cricket League on 21 April 2017. He made his first-class debut for Barisal Division in the 2017–18 National Cricket League on 15 September 2017. He made his Twenty20 debut for Khulna Titans on 24 November 2017 in the 2017–18 Bangladesh Premier League.

He was the leading wicket-taker for Khelaghar Samaj Kallyan Samity in the 2017–18 Dhaka Premier Division Cricket League, with 22 dismissals in 16 matches.

In October 2018, he was named in the Khulna Titans team's squad, following the 2018–19 Bangladesh Premier League draft. In December 2018, he was named in Bangladesh's team for the 2018 ACC Emerging Teams Asia Cup. In November 2019, he was named in Bangladesh's squad for the 2019 ACC Emerging Teams Asia Cup in Bangladesh. Later the same month, he was selected to play for the Khulna Tigers in the 2019–20 Bangladesh Premier League, and he was named in Bangladesh's squad for the men's cricket tournament at the 2019 South Asian Games. The Bangladesh team won the gold medal, after they beat Sri Lanka by seven wickets in the final.

In February 2021, he was selected in the Bangladesh Emerging squad for their home series against the Ireland Wolves. In the unofficial Test match, Islam took thirteen wickets in the match, including 8/51 in the second innings.

== International career ==
In March 2023, he named as Twenty20 International (T20I) squad for their series against England. He made his T20I debut in the third T20I of the series, on 14 March 2023.

In May 2024, he was named in Bangladesh's squad for the 2024 ICC Men's T20 World Cup tournament.

In July 2025, he made his ODI debut against Sri Lanka. On 5 July 2025, in his career's 2nd ODI, he got his first five-wicket haul. He got wickets of Nishan Madushka, Kusal Mendis, Kamindu Mendis, Dunith Wellalage and Maheesh Theekshana.
