= 2024 Caribbean Premier League =

Twelfth season of the Caribbean Premier League

- Dates: 29 August – 6 October 2024
- Administrator: CPL Limited
- Cricket format: Twenty20
- Tournament format(s): Round-robin and playoffs
- Hosts: Various: Antigua and Barbuda; Barbados; Guyana; Saint Kitts and Nevis; Saint Lucia; Trinidad and Tobago
- Champions: Saint Lucia Kings (1st title)
- Runners-up: Guyana Amazon Warriors
- Participants: 6
- Matches: 34
- Player of the series: Noor Ahmad (Saint Lucia Kings)
- Most runs: Nicholas Pooran (Trinbago Knight Riders) (504)
- Most wickets: Noor Ahmad (Saint Lucia Kings) (22)
- Official website: cplt20.com

The 2024 Caribbean Premier League (CPLT20) or for sponsorship reasons, Republic Bank CPL 2024 was the twelfth season of the Caribbean Premier League, the domestic Twenty20 cricket league that was played in the West Indies. The tournament was played from 29 August with the final held on 6 October 2024. The matches were played across six countries in the Caribbean: Antigua and Barbuda, Barbados, Guyana, Saint Kitts and Nevis, Saint Lucia, and Trinidad and Tobago. Guyana Amazon Warriors were the defending champions.

In the final, Saint Lucia Kings defeated Guyana Amazon Warriors by 6 wickets to win their first title.

== Teams ==
The Jamaica Tallawahs were replaced by Antigua & Barbuda Falcons.

| Team | Captain | Head coach |
|---|---|---|
| Antigua & Barbuda Falcons | Chris Green | Shivnarine Chanderpaul |
| Barbados Royals | Mohammad Rizwan | Trevor Penney |
| Guyana Amazon Warriors | Imran Tahir | Lance Klusener |
| St Kitts & Nevis Patriots | Andre Fletcher | Malolan Rangarajan |
| Saint Lucia Kings | Faf du Plessis | Daren Sammy |
| Trinbago Knight Riders | Kieron Pollard | Phil Simmons |

== Venues ==
Venues in the Caribbean
2024 Caribbean Premier League is located in the Caribbean
| Antigua and Barbuda | Barbados | Guyana | |
| Sir Vivian Richards Stadium | Kensington Oval | Providence Stadium | |
| Capacity: 10,000 | Capacity: 11,000 | Capacity: 20,000 | |
| Saint Kitts and Nevis | Saint Lucia | Trinidad and Tobago | |
| Warner Park Sporting Complex | Daren Sammy Cricket Ground | Brian Lara Cricket Academy | Queen's Park Oval |
| Capacity: 8,000 | Capacity: 15,000 | Capacity: 15,000 | Capacity: 20,000 |

== Squads ==
The following players were retained or signed by their respective teams for the tournament and the players draft was held on July 15, 2024.

Squads for the 2024 Caribbean Premier League
| Antigua & Barbuda Falcons | Barbados Royals | Guyana Amazon Warriors | St Kitts & Nevis Patriots | Saint Lucia Kings | Trinbago Knight Riders |
Coaches
| Shivnarine Chanderpaul | Trevor Penney | Lance Klusener | Malolan Rangarajan | Daren Sammy | Phil Simmons |
Captains
| Chris Green | Mohammad Rizwan | Imran Tahir | Andre Fletcher | Faf du Plessis | Kieron Pollard |
Players
| Fabian Allen; Mohammad Amir; Jewel Andrew; Sam Billings; Teddy Bishop; Babar Azam; Jahmar Hamilton; Joshua James; Kofi James; Hassan Khan; Brandon King; ~~Azmatullah Omarzai~~; Kelvin Pitman; Roshon Primus; Shamar Springer; Hayden Walsh Jr.; Imad Wasim; Fakhar Zaman | Kadeem Alleyne; Alick Athanaze; Rivaldo Clarke; Rahkeem Cornwall; Naveen-ul-Haq; Jason Holder; Quinton de Kock; Keshav Maharaj; Obed McCoy; David Miller; Nathan Sealy; Ramon Simmonds; Maheesh Theekshana; Isai Thorne; Dunith Wellalage; Kevin Wickham; Nyeem Young | Moeen Ali; Ronaldo Alimohamed; Kevlon Anderson; ~~Saim Ayub~~; Rahmanullah Gurbaz; Shimron Hetmyer; Shai Hope; Shamar Joseph; Azam Khan; Gudakesh Motie; Matthew Nandu; Keemo Paul; Dwaine Pretorius; Raymon Reifer; Tim Robinson; Romario Shepherd; Junior Sinclair; Kevin Sinclair; Nathan Sowter | Josh Clarkson; Dominic Drakes; Wanindu Hasaranga; Ryan John; Johann Layne; Evin Lewis; Mikyle Louis; Kyle Mayers; Ashmead Nedd; Anrich Nortje; Veerasammy Permaul; Sikandar Raza; Rilee Rossouw; Sherfane Rutherford; Tabraiz Shamsi; Joshua Da Silva; Odean Smith; ~~Tristan Stubbs~~; Nuwan Thushara | Noor Ahmad; Ackeem Auguste; Khari Campbell; Johnson Charles; Roston Chase; McKenny Clarke; Shadrack Descarte; Matthew Forde; Mikkel Govia; Johann Jeremiah; Aaron Jones; Alzarri Joseph; ~~Heinrich Klaasen~~; Khary Pierre; Bhanuka Rajapaksa; Tim Seifert; David Wiese | ~~Dwayne Bravo~~; Keacy Carty; Tim David; Mark Deyal; Nathan Edward; Andries Gous; Terrance Hinds; Akeal Hosein; Chris Jordan; Ali Khan; Josh Little; Sunil Narine; Shaqkere Parris; Nicholas Pooran; Jason Roy; Andre Russell; Waqar Salamkheil; Jayden Seales; Bryan Charles |

Heinrich Klaasen was ruled out of the tournament due to a family emergency and was replaced by Tim Seifert. Josh Clarkson replaced Tristan Stubbs, who had to return for national duties. Saim Ayub was ruled out of the tournament for national duties and was replaced by Moeen Ali. Tim Robinson will serve as a minor replacement for both Moeen Ali and Rahmanullah Gurbaz. On 8 September, Sherfane Rutherford pulled out of the rest of the tournament due to personal reasons. Fakhar Zaman also pulled out of the rest of the tournament on 8 September to participate in Pakistan's Champions One-Day Cup.

== Points table ==
The tournament follows a double round-robin format in the league stage wherein each team plays ten games. The top four teams will qualify for the play-offs.

| Pos | Team | Pld | W | L | NR | Pts | NRR | Qualification |
|---|---|---|---|---|---|---|---|---|
| 1 | Guyana Amazon Warriors (R) | 10 | 7 | 3 | 0 | 14 | 0.854 | Advanced to Qualifier 1 |
| 2 | Saint Lucia Kings (C) | 10 | 7 | 3 | 0 | 14 | 0.673 | Advanced to Qualifier 1 |
| 3 | Trinbago Knight Riders | 10 | 7 | 3 | 0 | 14 | 0.404 | Advanced to Eliminator |
| 4 | Barbados Royals | 10 | 5 | 5 | 0 | 10 | 0.084 | Advanced to Eliminator |
| 5 | Antigua & Barbuda Falcons | 10 | 3 | 7 | 0 | 6 | −0.592 | |
| 6 | St Kitts & Nevis Patriots | 10 | 1 | 9 | 0 | 2 | −1.479 | |

Source: ESPNcricinfo
(C) Champions; (R) Runners-up
- If teams fail to bowl their overs within the allotted time they will be given a Net Run Rate penalty as outlined below:
  - One (1) over down-Penalty of 0.05 deduction from their NRR
  - Each additional over down-Penalty of 0.10 deduction from their NRR

== League stage ==
The full schedule of the tournament was announced on 10 April 2024.

Match 1
29 August 2024
19:00 (N)
Scorecard

| Antigua & Barbuda Falcons; 163/4 (20 overs) | v | St Kitts & Nevis Patriots; 164/9 (20 overs) |
| Jewel Andrew 50* (30); Ashmead Nedd 1/21 (4 overs) | | Kyle Mayers 39 (24); Shamar Springer 4/29 (4 overs) |

St Kitts & Nevis Patriots won by 1 wicket
Sir Vivian Richards Stadium, Antigua
Umpires: Deighton Butler (WI) and Nigel Duguid (WI)
Player of the match: Kyle Mayers (St Kitts & Nevis Patriots)

- St Kitts & Nevis Patriots won the toss and elected to field.
- Jewel Andrew, Teddy Bishop (Antigua & Barbuda Falcons) and Ryan John (St Kitts & Nevis Patriots) all made their T20 debuts.

Match 2
30 August 2024
19:00 (N)
Scorecard

| Antigua & Barbuda Falcons; 168/6 (20 overs) | v | Guyana Amazon Warriors; 171/7 (20 overs) |
| Imad Wasim 40 (21); Gudakesh Motie 3/25 (4 overs) | | Shai Hope 41 (34); Imad Wasim 2/28 (4 overs) |

Guyana Amazon Warriors won by 3 wickets
Sir Vivian Richards Stadium, Antigua
Umpires: Patrick Gustard (WI) and Christopher Taylor (WI)
Player of the match: Gudakesh Motie (Guyana Amazon Warriors)

- Guyana Amazon Warriors won the toss and elected to field.

Match 3
31 August 2024
19:00 (N)
Scorecard

| Trinbago Knight Riders; 250/4 (20 overs) | v | St Kitts & Nevis Patriots; 206/8 (20 overs) |
| Nicholas Pooran 97 (43); Anrich Nortje 2/37 (4 overs) | | Mikyle Louis 56 (38); Sunil Narine 2/24 (4 overs) |

Trinbago Knight Riders won by 44 runs
Warner Park Sporting Complex, St Kitts
Umpires: Zahid Bassarath (WI) and Leslie Reifer (WI)
Player of the match: Nicholas Pooran (Trinbago Knight Riders)

- St Kitts and Nevis Patriots won the toss and elected to field.
- Mikyle Louis (St Kitts & Nevis Patriots), Nathan Edward and Shaqkere Parris (Trinbago Knight Riders) all made their T20 debuts.

Match 4
1 September 2024
10:00
Scorecard

| Antigua & Barbuda Falcons; 145/9 (20 overs) | v | Barbados Royals; 149/1 (15.3 overs) |
| Jewel Andrew 48 (35); Obed McCoy 3/31 (4 overs) | | Quinton de Kock 87* (45); Imad Wasim 1/21 (3 overs) |

Barbados Royals won by 9 wickets
Sir Vivian Richards Stadium, Antigua
Umpires: Nigel Duguid (WI) and Patrick Gustard (WI)
Player of the match: Quinton de Kock (Barbados Royals)

- Barbados Royals won the toss and elected to field.

Match 5
1 September 2024
19:00 (N)
Scorecard

| St Kitts & Nevis Patriots; 201/3 (20 overs) | v | Saint Lucia Kings; 202/5 (17.2 overs) |
| Evin Lewis 100* (54); David Wiese 2/29 (3 overs) | | Bhanuka Rajapaksa 68* (35); Anrich Nortje 2/29 (4 overs) |

Saint Lucia Kings won by 5 wickets
Warner Park Sporting Complex, St Kitts
Umpires: Gregory Brathwaite (WI) and Carl Tuckett (WI)
Player of the match: Kyle Mayers (St Kitts & Nevis Patriots)

- Saint Lucia Kings won the toss and elected to field.
- Mikkel Govia (Saint Lucia Kings) made his T20 debut.

Match 6
3 September 2024
19:00 (N)
Scorecard

| Antigua & Barbuda Falcons; 142/7 (20 overs) | v | Saint Lucia Kings; 144/3 (17 overs) |
| Justin Greaves 36 (26); Noor Ahmad 3/18 (4 overs) | | Johnson Charles 47* (46); Imad Wasim 1/21 (4 overs) |

Saint Lucia Kings won by 7 wickets
Sir Vivian Richards Stadium, Antigua
Umpires: Deighton Butler (WI) and Christopher Taylor (WI)
Player of the match: Noor Ahmad (Saint Lucia Kings)

- Saint Lucia Kings won the toss and elected to field.

Match 7
4 September 2024
19:00 (N)
Scorecard

| Guyana Amazon Warriors; 266/7 (20 overs) | v | St Kitts & Nevis Patriots; 226 (18 overs) |
| Shimron Hetmyer 91 (39); Veerasammy Permaul 1/14 (2 overs) | | Andre Fletcher 81 (33); Gudakesh Motie 3/34 (4 overs) |

Guyana Amazon Warriors won by 40 runs
Warner Park Sporting Complex, St Kitts
Umpires: Gregory Brathwaite (WI) and Leslie Reifer (WI)
Player of the match: Shimron Hetmyer (Guyana Amazon Warriors)

- Guyana Amazon Warriors won the toss and elected to bat.
- Guyana Amazon Warriors scored the second-highest total in the history of CPL.

Match 8
5 September 2024
19:00 (N)
Scorecard

| Antigua & Barbuda Falcons; 176/6 (20 overs) | v | Trinbago Knight Riders; 170/9 (20 overs) |
| Imad Wasim 46 (29); Waqar Salamkheil 2/37 (4 overs) | | Andries Gous 39 (33); Fabian Allen 3/23 (4 overs) |

Antigua & Barbuda Falcons won by 6 runs
Sir Vivian Richards Stadium, Antigua
Umpires: Patrick Gustard (WI) and Christopher Taylor (WI)
Player of the match: Fabian Allen (Antigua & Barbuda Falcons)

- Trinbago Knight Riders won the toss and elected to field.

Match 9
6 September 2024
19:00 (N)
Scorecard

| St Kitts & Nevis Patriots; 153/8 (20 overs) | v | Barbados Royals; 157/8 (19.5 overs) |
| Wanindu Hasaranga 40 (27); Dunith Wellalage 3/35 (4 overs) | | Dunith Wellalage 39 (32); Kyle Mayers 2/17 (3 overs) |

Barbados Royals won by 2 wickets
Warner Park Sporting Complex, St Kitts
Umpires: Zahid Bassarath (WI) and Carl Tuckett (WI)
Player of the match: Dunith Wellalage (Barbados Royals)

- Barbados Royals won the toss and elected to field.

Match 10
7 September 2024
19:00 (N)
Scorecard

| Saint Lucia Kings; 100 (14.3 overs) | v | Guyana Amazon Warriors; 101/4 (10 overs) |
| Matthew Forde 31 (21); Gudakesh Motie 3/16 (3.3 overs) | | Rahmanullah Gurbaz 47 (19); Noor Ahmad 3/22 (4 overs) |

Guyana Amazon Warriors won by 6 wickets
Daren Sammy Cricket Ground, Saint Lucia
Umpires: Deighton Butler (WI) and Nigel Duguid (WI)
Player of the match: Gudakesh Motie (Guyana Amazon Warriors)

- Guyana Amazon Warriors won the toss and elected to field.

Match 11
8 September 2024
10:00
Scorecard

| St Kitts & Nevis Patriots; 153/8 (20 overs) | v | Antigua & Barbuda Falcons; 154/8 (19.4 overs) |
| Mikyle Louis 63 (36); Mohammad Amir 3/27 (4 overs) | | Justin Greaves 30 (16); Wanindu Hasaranga 4/16 (4 overs) |

Antigua & Barbuda Falcons won by 2 wickets
Warner Park Sporting Complex, St Kitts
Umpires: Gregory Brathwaite (WI) and Carl Tuckett (WI)
Player of the match: Imad Wasim (Antigua & Barbuda Falcons)

- Antigua & Barbuda Falcons won the toss and elected to field.

Match 12
10 September 2024
19:00 (N)
Scorecard

| Saint Lucia Kings; 187/6 (20 overs) | v | Trinbago Knight Riders; 189/6 (19.1 overs) |
| Roston Chase 56* (40); Sunil Narine 2/13 (4 overs) | | Shaqkere Parris 57 (33); Noor Ahmad 2/35 (4 overs) |

Trinbago Knight Riders won by 4 wickets
Daren Sammy Cricket Ground, Saint Lucia
Umpires: Nigel Duguid (WI) and Patrick Gustard (WI)
Player of the match: Kieron Pollard (Trinbago Knight Riders)

- Trinbago Knight Riders won the toss and elected to field.
- Khari Campbell (Saint Lucia Kings) made his T20 debut.

Match 13
11 September 2024
19:00 (N)
Scorecard

| Antigua & Barbuda Falcons; 176/5 (20 overs) | v | Barbados Royals; 127/3 (14.3 overs) |
| Justin Greaves 61* (52); Naveen-ul-Haq 2/34 (3 overs) | | Quinton de Kock 48 (30); Roshon Primus 1/23 (1 over) |

Barbados Royals won by 10 runs (DLS method)
Kensington Oval, Barbados
Umpires: Zahid Bassarath (WI) and Leslie Reifer (WI)
Player of the match: Quinton de Kock (Barbados Royals)

- Barbados Royals won the toss and elected to field.
- No further play was possible due to rain.
- Barbados Royals were 10 runs ahead of the DLS par score of 117 runs from 14.3 overs.

Match 14
12 September 2024
19:00 (N)
Scorecard

| St Kitts & Nevis Patriots; 173/5 (20 overs) | v | Saint Lucia Kings; 176/5 (16.3 overs) |
| Andre Fletcher 62 (50); Alzarri Joseph 2/38 (4 overs) | | Johnson Charles 74 (42); Wanindu Hasaranga 2/13 (3 overs) |

Saint Lucia Kings won by 5 wickets
Daren Sammy Cricket Ground, Saint Lucia
Umpires: Deighton Butler (WI) and Nigel Duguid (WI)
Player of the match: Johnson Charles (Saint Lucia Kings)

- Saint Lucia Kings won the toss and elected to field.

Match 15
13 September 2024
19:00 (N)
Scorecard

| Barbados Royals; 156/7 (20 overs) | v | Trinbago Knight Riders; 159/8 (19.5 overs) |
| Rovman Powell 59* (38); Waqar Salamkheil 3/13 (4 overs) | | Nicholas Pooran 35 (23); Maheesh Theekshana 3/26 (4 overs) |

Trinbago Knight Riders won by 2 wickets
Kensington Oval, Barbados
Umpires: Gregory Brathwaite (WI) and Carl Tuckett (WI)
Player of the match: Akeal Hosein (Trinbago Knight Riders)

- Trinbago Knight Riders won the toss and elected to field.

Match 16
14 September 2024
19:00 (N)
Scorecard

| Barbados Royals; 205/6 (20 overs) | v | Guyana Amazon Warriors; 173/5 (20 overs) |
| Quinton de Kock 115 (68); Raymon Reifer 3/50 (4 overs) | | Shai Hope 40 (34); Keshav Maharaj 3/42 (4 overs) |

Barbados Royals won by 32 runs
Kensington Oval, Barbados
Umpires: Zahid Bassarath (WI) and Leslie Reifer (WI)
Player of the match: Quinton de Kock (Barbados Royals)

- Guyana Amazon Warriors won the toss and elected to field.

Match 17
15 September 2024
19:00 (N)
Scorecard

| Saint Lucia Kings; 152/8 (20 overs) | v | Antigua & Barbuda Falcons; 126/8 (20 overs) |
| David Wiese 43* (26); Chris Green 4/22 (4 overs) | | Chris Green 48 (37); Khary Pierre 3/24 (4 overs) |

Saint Lucia Kings won by 26 runs
Daren Sammy Cricket Ground, Saint Lucia
Umpires: Patrick Gustard (WI) and Christopher Taylor (WI)
Player of the match: Khary Pierre (Saint Lucia Kings)

- Antigua & Barbuda Falcons won the toss and elected to field.

Match 18
17 September 2024
19:00 (N)
Scorecard

| St Kitts & Nevis Patriots; 110 (19.1 overs) | v | Barbados Royals; 113/1 (11.2 overs) |
| Andre Fletcher 32 (22); Rahkeem Cornwall 5/16 (4 overs) | | Quinton de Kock 59* (38); Wanindu Hasaranga 1/22 (2 overs) |

Barbados Royals won by 9 wickets
Kensington Oval, Barbados
Umpires: Gregory Brathwaite (WI) and Carl Tuckett (WI)
Player of the match: Rahkeem Cornwall (Barbados Royals)

- Barbados Royals won the toss and elected to field.
- Rahkeem Cornwall (Barbados Royals) took his first five-wicket haul in T20s.

Match 19
18 September 2024
19:00 (N)
Scorecard

| Guyana Amazon Warriors; 148/7 (20 overs) | v | Trinbago Knight Riders; 149/5 (19.2 overs) |
| Romario Shepherd 51* (24); Waqar Salamkheil 2/19 (4 overs) | | Andre Russell 36* (15); Nathan Sowter 2/37 (4 overs) |

Trinbago Knight Riders won by 5 wickets
Queen's Park Oval, Trinidad
Umpires: Deighton Butler (WI) and Nigel Duguid (WI)
Player of the match: Andre Russell (Trinbago Knight Riders)

- Trinbago Knight Riders won the toss and elected to field.

Match 20
19 September 2024
19:00 (N)
Scorecard

| Trinbago Knight Riders; 134/8 (20 overs) | v | Antigua & Barbuda Falcons; 135/4 (19 overs) |
| Kieron Pollard 47 (37); Fabian Allen 2/13 (2 overs) | | Justin Greaves 46 (48); Andre Russell 1/7 (2 overs) |

Antigua & Barbuda Falcons won by 6 wickets
Queen's Park Oval, Trinidad
Umpires: Patrick Gustard (WI) and Christopher Taylor (WI)
Player of the match: Justin Greaves (Antigua & Barbuda Falcons)

- Antigua & Barbuda Falcons won the toss and elected to field.

Match 21
20 September 2024
19:00 (N)
Scorecard

| Guyana Amazon Warriors; 137/8 (20 overs) | v | St Kitts & Nevis Patriots; 107 (18.3 overs) |
| Shimron Hetmyer 63 (33); Ashmead Nedd 4/25 (4 overs) | | Evin Lewis 49 (46); Shamar Joseph 3/9 (2.3 overs) |

Guyana Amazon Warriors won by 30 runs
Providence Stadium, Guyana
Umpires: Zahid Bassarath (WI) and Leslie Reifer (WI)
Player of the match: Shimron Hetmyer (Guyana Amazon Warriors)

- St Kitts & Nevis Patriots won the toss and elected to field.

Match 22
21 September 2024
10:00
Scorecard

| Barbados Royals; 96/9 (20 overs) | v | Saint Lucia Kings; 97/3 (13.5 overs) |
| David Miller 21 (20); Alzarri Joseph 4/22 (4 overs) | | Roston Chase 39* (38); Maheesh Theekshana 1/16 (3 overs) |

Saint Lucia Kings won by 7 wickets
Providence Stadium, Guyana
Umpires: Gregory Brathwaite (WI) and Carl Tuckett (WI)
Player of the match: Alzarri Joseph (Saint Lucia Kings)

- Barbados Royals won the toss and elected to bat.

Match 23
21 September 2024
19:00 (N)
Scorecard

| Guyana Amazon Warriors; 135/7 (20 overs) | v | Antigua & Barbuda Falcons; 108 (18.5 overs) |
| Moeen Ali 42 (33); Mohammad Amir 2/15 (4 overs) | | Kofi James 27 (23); Moeen Ali 3/9 (4 overs) |

Guyana Amazon Warriors won by 27 runs
Providence Stadium, Guyana
Umpires: Zahid Bassarath (WI) and Leslie Reifer (WI)
Player of the match: Moeen Ali (Guyana Amazon Warriors)

- Antigua & Barbuda Falcons won the toss and elected to field.

Match 24
22 September 2024
10:00
Scorecard

| Saint Lucia Kings; 162/3 (20 overs) | v | Barbados Royals; 149/8 (20 overs) |
| Johnson Charles 53 (42); Nyeem Young 1/13 (1 over) | | Kadeem Alleyne 47 (25); David Wiese 2/17 (3 overs) |

Saint Lucia Kings won by 13 runs
Providence Stadium, Guyana
Umpires: Gregory Brathwaite (WI) and Carl Tuckett (WI)
Player of the match: Johnson Charles (Saint Lucia Kings)

- Barbados Royals won the toss and elected to field.

Match 25
22 September 2024
19:00 (N)
Scorecard

| St Kitts & Nevis Patriots; 193/4 (20 overs) | v | Trinbago Knight Riders; 197/3 (18.3 overs) |
| Andre Fletcher 93 (61); Chris Jordan 2/29 (4 overs) | | Nicholas Pooran 93* (43); Kyle Mayers 1/26 (3 overs) |

Trinbago Knight Riders won by 7 wickets
Brian Lara Cricket Academy, Trinidad
Umpires: Nigel Duguid (WI) and Patrick Gustard (WI)
Player of the match: Nicholas Pooran (Trinbago Knight Riders)

- Trinbago Knight Riders won the toss and elected to field.

Match 26
24 September 2024
10:00
Scorecard

| Saint Lucia Kings; 218/6 (20 overs) | v | Trinbago Knight Riders; 138 (17.5 overs) |
| Johnson Charles 89 (40); Kieron Pollard 4/38 (4 overs) | | Jason Roy 41 (29); Noor Ahmad 3/39 (4 overs) |

Saint Lucia Kings won by 80 runs
Brian Lara Cricket Academy, Trinidad
Umpires: Deighton Butler (WI) and Christopher Taylor (WI)
Player of the match: Johnson Charles (Saint Lucia Kings)

- Trinbago Knight Riders won the toss and elected to field.

Match 27
25 September 2024
19:00 (N)
Scorecard

| Guyana Amazon Warriors; 219/8 (20 overs) | v | Barbados Royals; 172/9 (20 overs) |
| Shai Hope 71 (37); Maheesh Theekshana 3/15 (4 overs) | | David Miller 71* (34); Gudakesh Motie 3/42 (4 overs) |

Guyana Amazon Warriors won by 47 runs
Providence Stadium, Guyana
Umpires: Zahid Bassarath (WI) and Leslie Reifer (WI)
Player of the match: Shai Hope (Guyana Amazon Warriors)

- Barbados Royals won the toss and elected to field.

Match 28
27 September 2024
20:00 (N)
Scorecard

| Trinbago Knight Riders; 175/5 (20 overs) | v | Barbados Royals; 145/9 (20 overs) |
| Kieron Pollard 42 (27); Maheesh Theekshana 3/35 (4 overs); Naveen-ul-Haq 3/35 (4 overs) | | Alick Athanaze 44 (33); Akeal Hosein 3/15 (4 overs) |

Trinbago Knight Riders won by 30 runs
Brian Lara Cricket Academy, Trinidad
Umpires: Deighton Butler (WI) and Nigel Duguid (WI)
Player of the match: Akeal Hosein (Trinbago Knight Riders)

- Barbados Royals won the toss and elected to field.

Match 29
28 September 2024
10:00
Scorecard

| Guyana Amazon Warriors; 207/7 (20 overs) | v | Saint Lucia Kings; 172/7 (20 overs) |
| Shimron Hetmyer 58 (30); David Wiese 3/43 (4 overs) | | Faf du Plessis 92* (59); Imran Tahir 2/20 (4 overs) |

Guyana Amazon Warriors won by 35 runs
Providence Stadium, Guyana
Umpires: Gregory Brathwaite (WI) and Carl Tuckett (WI)
Player of the match: Shimron Hetmyer (Guyana Amazon Warriors)

- Guyana Amazon Warriors won the toss and elected to bat.

Match 30
29 September 2024
19:00 (N)
Scorecard

| Trinbago Knight Riders; 211/5 (20 overs) | v | Guyana Amazon Warriors; 137 (18.5 overs) |
| Nicholas Pooran 101 (59); Shamar Joseph 3/50 (4 overs) | | Rahmanullah Gurbaz 36 (22); Terrance Hinds 3/17 (4 overs) |

Trinbago Knight Riders won by 74 runs
Providence Stadium, Guyana
Umpires: Zahid Bassarath (WI) and Leslie Reifer (WI)
Player of the match: Nicholas Pooran (Trinbago Knight Riders)

- Trinbago Knight Riders won the toss and elected to bat.

== Play-offs ==
Qualifier 1
2 October 2024 — Guyana
1 | Guyana Amazon Warriors | 106/4 (13 overs)
2 | Saint Lucia Kings | 198/5 (20 overs)
Eliminator
1 October 2024 — Guyana
3 | Trinbago Knight Riders | 168/3 (19.1 overs)
4 | Barbados Royals | 64/1 (4.2 overs)

Qualifier 2
4 October 2024 — Guyana
Q1L | Guyana Amazon Warriors | 149/2 (14.3 overs)
EW | Barbados Royals | 148 (20 overs)

Final
6 October 2024 — Guyana
Q1W | Saint Lucia Kings | 139/4 (18.1 overs)
Q2W | Guyana Amazon Warriors | 138/8 (20 overs)

=== Eliminator ===
1 October 2024
19:00 (N)
Scorecard

| Trinbago Knight Riders; 168/3 (19.1 overs) | v | Barbados Royals; 64/1 (4.2 overs) |
| Nicholas Pooran 91* (60); Naveen-ul-Haq 1/25 (4 overs) | | David Miller 50* (17); Sunil Narine 1/22 (2 overs) |

Barbados Royals won by 9 wickets (DLS method)
Providence Stadium, Guyana
Umpires: Nigel Duguid (WI) and Leslie Reifer (WI)
Player of the match: David Miller (Barbados Royals)

- Trinbago Knight Riders won the toss and elected to bat.
- Barbados Royals were set a revised target of 60 runs from 5 overs due to floodlight failure.

=== Qualifier 1 ===
2 October 2024
19:00 (N)
Scorecard

| Saint Lucia Kings; 198/5 (20 overs) | v | Guyana Amazon Warriors; 106/4 (13 overs) |
| Johnson Charles 79 (45); Moeen Ali 2/24 (4 overs) | | Shimron Hetmyer 37* (18); David Wiese 1/3 (1 over) |

Saint Lucia Kings won by 15 runs (DLS method)
Providence Stadium, Guyana
Umpires: Nigel Duguid (WI) and Carl Tuckett (WI)
Player of the match: Johnson Charles (Saint Lucia Kings)

- Saint Lucia Kings won the toss and elected to bat.
- Rain prevented any further play.
- Guyana Amazon Warriors were 15 runs behind the DLS par score of 121 from 13 overs.

=== Qualifier 2 ===
4 October 2024
19:00 (N)
Scorecard

| Barbados Royals; 148 (20 overs) | v | Guyana Amazon Warriors; 149/2 (14.3 overs) |
| David Miller 36 (26); Romario Shepherd 3/35 (4 overs) | | Shai Hope 56 (33); Ramon Simmonds 1/26 (3.3 overs) |

Guyana Amazon Warriors won by 8 wickets
Providence Stadium, Guyana
Umpires: Zahid Bassarath (WI) and Patrick Gustard (WI)
Player of the match: Moeen Ali (Guyana Amazon Warriors)

- Guyana Amazon Warriors won the toss and elected to field.

=== Final ===
6 October 2024
19:00 (N)
Scorecard

| Guyana Amazon Warriors; 138/8 (20 overs) | v | Saint Lucia Kings; 139/4 (18.1 overs) |
| Dwaine Pretorius 25 (12); Noor Ahmad 3/19 (4 overs) | | Aaron Jones 48* (31); Kevin Sinclair 1/5 (1.1 overs) |

Saint Lucia Kings won by 6 wickets
Providence Stadium, Guyana
Umpires: Zahid Bassarath (WI) and Patrick Gustard (WI)
Player of the match: Roston Chase (Saint Lucia Kings)

- Saint Lucia Kings won the toss and elected to field.

== Statistics ==
=== Boundary Meter ===
| 6s | 4s |
|---|---|
| 577 | 776 |

=== Most runs ===
| Runs | Player | Team | Mat | Inns | Ave | SR | HS | 100 | 50 | 4s | 6s |
|---|---|---|---|---|---|---|---|---|---|---|---|
| 504 | Nicholas Pooran | Trinbago Knight Riders | 11 | 11 | 56.00 | 169.69 | 107 | 2 | 5 | 41 | 35 |
| 453 | Quinton de Kock | Barbados Royals | 12 | 12 | 45.30 | 161.78 | 115 | 1 | 2 | 37 | 28 |
| 452 | Johnson Charles | Saint Lucia Kings | 12 | 12 | 41.09 | 153.22 | 89 | 0 | 4 | 39 | 31 |
| 405 | Faf du Plessis | Saint Lucia Kings | 12 | 12 | 36.81 | 145.16 | 92* | 0 | 4 | 34 | 22 |
| 402 | Shimron Hetmyer | Guyana Amazon Warriors | 13 | 13 | 40.20 | 185.25 | 91 | 0 | 4 | 21 | 32 |
Source: ESPNcricinfo

=== Most wickets ===
| Wkts | Player | Team | Mat | Inns | BBI | Avg | Econ | SR | 4w | 5w |
|---|---|---|---|---|---|---|---|---|---|---|
| 22 | Noor Ahmad | Saint Lucia Kings | 12 | 12 | 3/18 | 13.22 | 6.19 | 12.81 | 0 | 0 |
| 17 | Maheesh Theekshana | Barbados Royals | 12 | 12 | 3/15 | 17.52 | 6.34 | 16.58 | 0 | 0 |
| 17 | Gudakesh Motie | Guyana Amazon Warriors | 13 | 13 | 3/16 | 18.64 | 7.28 | 15.35 | 0 | 0 |
| 16 | Imran Tahir | Guyana Amazon Warriors | 11 | 11 | 3/29 | 20.31 | 8.09 | 15.06 | 0 | 0 |
| 16 | Alzarri Joseph | Saint Lucia Kings | 12 | 12 | 4/22 | 21.75 | 8.25 | 15.81 | 1 | 0 |
| 16 | Dwaine Pretorius | Guyana Amazon Warriors | 13 | 13 | 3/9 | 24.18 | 8.26 | 17.56 | 0 | 0 |
Source: ESPNcricinfo

== Attendances ==
The best-attended 2024 CPL game was between the Guyana Amazon Warriors and the Trinbago Knight Riders, with 19,967 tickets sold.

| # | Team | Average attendance |
|---|---|---|
| 1 | Guyana Amazon Warriors | 12,764 |
| 2 | Trinbago Knight Riders | 11,500 |
| 3 | Saint Lucia Kings | 6,754 |
| 4 | Barbados Royals | 3,872 |
| 5 | St. Kitts & Nevis Patriots | 2,321 |
| 6 | Antigua & Barbuda Falcons | 1,004 |
