= 2025 West Indies Breakout League =

Inaugural season of the West Indies Breakout League

- Dates: 25 April – 10 May 2025
- Administrator(s): Cricket West Indies; Caribbean Premier League
- Cricket format: Twenty20
- Tournament format(s): Single round-robin and playoffs
- Host: Trinidad and Tobago
- Champions: Trinidad & Tobago Legions (1st title)
- Runners-up: Leeward Islands Thunder
- Participants: 6
- Matches: 17
- Most runs: Kofi James (240)
- Most wickets: Micah McKenzie (12)
- Official website: Windies Cricket

The 2025 West Indies Breakout League was the inaugural edition of the West Indies Breakout League, a Twenty20 cricket tournament that was established by Cricket West Indies (CWI) and Caribbean Premier League (CPL). It was held in the West Indies to focus on emerging talents from across the region. The tournament featured 6 teams that competed in 17 matches from 25 April to 10 May 2025, with all matches played at the Brian Lara Cricket Academy in Trinidad and Tobago. Trinidad & Tobago Legions are the defending champions.

== History ==
The tournament was established by the Cricket West Indies and the Caribbean Premier League, which commenced in April 2025. The creation of the tournament was aimed to display emerging talent from across the region.

== Teams ==
Team	Captain
Barbados Pelicans	Nyeem Young
Guyana Rainforest Rangers	Kemol Savory
Jamaica Titans	Ramaal Lewis
Leeward Islands Thunder	Karima Gore
Trinidad & Tobago Legions	Joshua Da Silva
Windward Islands Infernos	Alick Athanaze

== Squads ==
Barbados Pelicans	Guyana Rainforest Rangers	Jamaica Titans	Leeward Islands Thunder	Trinidad & Tobago Legions	Windward Islands Infernos
Nyeem Young (c); Leniko Boucher; Kadeem Alleyne; Joshua Bishop; Shaqkere Parris; Kevin Wickham; Zishan Motara; Ramon Simmonds; Junior Sinclair; Demetrius Richards; Shian Brathwaite; Sion Hackett; Nathan Sealy; Amari Goodridge	Kemol Savory (c); Nial Smith; Ronaldo Alimohamed; Kevin Sinclair; Ashmead Nedd; Kevlon Anderson; Riyad Latif; Rivaldo Clarke; Jediah Blades; Isai Thorne; Richie Looknauth; Zynul Ramsammy; Adrian Sukhwa; Quentin Sampson	Ramaal Lewis (c); Deethmar Anderson; Leroy Lugg; Jeavor Royal; Kirk McKenzie; Jordan Johnson; Tamarie Redwood; Michael Clarke; Govasta Edmond; Reon Edwards; Anthony Dacres; Brian Barnes; Andrew Rambaran; Zion Brathwaite	Karima Gore (c); ~~Jeremiah Louis~~; Keacy Carty; Kofi James; Mikyle Louis; Jewel Andrew; Micah McKenzie; Nathan Edward; Giovonte Depeiza; Anderson Mahase; Michael Palmer; Jamie Cornelius; Jaden Carmichael; Jedidiah Martin; Cameron Pennyfeather	Joshua Da Silva (c); Kamil Pooran; Amir Jangoo; Jyd Goolie; Crystian Thurton; Navin Bidaisee; Mikkel Govia; Joshua James; McKenny Clarke; Cephas Cooper; Damien Joachim; Shaaron Lewis; Abdul-Raheem Toppin; Johann Layne	Alick Athanaze (c); Darel Cyrus; Shadrack Descarte; Shamar Springer; Dillon Douglas; Teddy Bishop; Ackeem Auguste; Ryshon Williams; Avinash Mahabirsingh; Johann Jeremiah; Kyron Phillips; Keon Gaston; Noelle Leo; Lee John

Jeremiah Louis was ruled out of the tournament with an injury and was replaced by Cameron Pennyfeather.

== Points table ==
Pos	Team	Pld	W	L	Pts	NRR	Qualification
1	Trinidad & Tobago Legions	5	4	1	31	0.966	Advance to the final
2	Windward Islands Infernos	5	3	2	28	1.310	Advance to the playoff
3	Leeward Islands Thunder	5	3	2	20	−0.094	Advance to the playoff
4	Barbados Pelicans	5	3	2	20	−0.598	
5	Guyana Rainforest Rangers	5	1	4	15	−0.324	
6	Jamaica Titans	5	1	4	8	−1.329	

Source: Windies Cricket, FanCode

== League stage ==
Match 1
25 April 2025
14:00
Scorecard

Windward Islands Infernos; 166/6 (20 overs)	v	Guyana Rainforest Rangers; 141/9 (20 overs)
Alick Athanaze 91* (57); Nial Smith 3/28 (4 overs)		Kevlon Anderson 58 (43); Darel Cyrus 4/37 (4 overs)

Windward Islands Infernos won by 25 runs
Brian Lara Cricket Academy, San Fernando
Umpires: Leslie Reifer and Carl Tuckett

- Guyana Rainforest Rangers won the toss and elected to field first.

Match 2
25 April 2025
19:00 (N)
Scorecard

Trinidad & Tobago Legions; 165/8 (20 overs)	v	Barbados Pelicans; 101 (19.3 overs)
Joshua James 39 (20); Junior Sinclair 2/17 (4 overs)		Nyeem Young 33 (36); Johann Layne 2/7 (4 overs)

Trinidad & Tobago Legions won by 64 runs
Brian Lara Cricket Academy, San Fernando
Umpires: Deighton Butler and Christopher Taylor

- Barbados Pelicans won the toss and elected to field first.

Match 3
26 April 2025
14:00
Scorecard

Jamaica Titans; 123/6 (20 overs)	v	Leeward Islands Thunder; 127/4 (16.4 overs)
Jordan Johnson 40 (45); Anderson Mahase 3/16 (4 overs)		Jordan Johnson 39 (20); Jeavor Royal 2/14 (4 overs)

Leeward Islands Thunder won by 6 wicket
Brian Lara Cricket Academy, San Fernando
Umpires: Zahid Bassarath and Lyndon Rajkumar

- Jamaica Titans won the toss and elected to bat first.

Match 4
26 April 2025
19:00 (N)
Scorecard

Trinidad & Tobago Legions; 173/6 (20 overs)	v	Guyana Rainforest Rangers; 150/9 (20 overs)
Joshua Da Silva 68 (36); Jediah Blades 2/18 (4 overs)		Kemol Savory 33 (30); Joshua James 3/35 (4 overs)

Trinidad & Tobago Legions won by 23 runs
Brian Lara Cricket Academy, San Fernando
Umpires: Carl Tuckett and Christopher Taylor

- Guyana Rainforest Rangers won the toss and elected to field first.

Match 5
29 April 2025
14:00
Scorecard

Jamaica Titans; 166 (20 overs)	v	Guyana Rainforest Rangers; 163/8 (20 overs)
Kirk McKenzie 51 (31); Jediah Blades 3/25 (4 overs)		Zeynul Ramsammy 44 (43); Anthony Dackers 2/23 (3 overs)

Jamaica Titans won by 3 runs
Brian Lara Cricket Academy, San Fernando
Umpires: Leslie Reifer and Deighton Butler

- Jamaica Titans won the toss and elected to bat first.

Match 6
29 April 2025
19:00 (N)
Scorecard

Barbados Pelicans; 199/5 (20 overs)	v	Windward Islands Infernos; 198/9 (20 overs)
Shian Brathwaite 85* (50); Avinash Mahabirsingh 2/28 (3 overs)		Teddy Bishop 61 (42); Nyeem Young 3/29 (4 overs)

Barbados Pelicans won by 1 run
Brian Lara Cricket Academy, San Fernando
Umpires: Zahid Bassarath and Christopher Taylor

- Windward Islands Infernos won the toss and elected to field first.

Match 7
30 April 2025
14:00
Scorecard

Jamaica Titans; 127/8 (20 overs)	v	Trinidad & Tobago Legions; 130/4 (18.3 overs)
Zion Brathwaite 37 (30); McKenny Clarke 2/14 (4 overs)		Kamil Pooran 45 (38); Andrew Rambaran 2/23 (4 overs)

Trinidad & Tobago Legions won by 6 wickets
Brian Lara Cricket Academy, San Fernando
Umpires: Carl Tuckett and Deighton Butler

- Trinidad & Tobago Legions won the toss and elected to field first.

Match 8
30 April 2025
19:00 (N)
Scorecard

Barbados Pelicans; 127 (19.5 overs)	v	Leeward Islands Thunder; 129/2 (16.3 overs)
Leniko Boucher 48 (51); Nathan Edward 5/27 (4 overs)		Jewel Andrew 36 (25); Nathan Sealy 1/27 (4 overs)

Leeward Islands Thunder won by 8 wickets
Brian Lara Cricket Academy, San Fernando
Umpires: Zahid Bassarath and Lyndon Rajkumar

- Barbados Pelicans won the toss and elected to bat first.

Match 9
2 May 2025
14:00
Scorecard

Barbados Pelicans; 155/7 (20 overs)	v	Jamaica Titans; 152/7 (20 overs)
Shaqkere Parris 41 (22); Jeavor Royal 2/15 (4 overs)		Jordan Johnson 34 (29); Zishan Motara 1/15 (4 overs)

Barbados Pelicans won by 3 runs
Brian Lara Cricket Academy, San Fernando
Umpires: Carl Tuckett and Zahid Bassarath

- Jamaica Titans won the toss and elected to field first.

Match 10
2 May 2025
19:00 (N)
Scorecard

Trinidad & Tobago Legions; 151/8 (20 overs)	v	Leeward Islands Thunder; 152/7 (17 overs)
Amir Jangoo 52 (39); Micah McKenzie 4/25 (4 overs)		Jewel Andrew 47 (28); Johann Layne 2/28 (4 overs)

Leeward Islands Thunder won by 3 wickets
Brian Lara Cricket Academy, San Fernando
Umpires: Leslie Reifer and Deighton Butler

- Leeward Islands Thunder won the toss and elected to field first.

Match 11
4 May 2025
14:00
Scorecard

Windward Islands Infernos; 162/7 (20 overs)	v	Trinidad & Tobago Legions; 164/4 (20 overs)
Johann Jeremiah 40 (35); Jyd Goolie 2/16 (4 overs)		Navin Bidaisee 56 (40); Darel Cyrus 1/26 (3 overs)

Trinidad & Tobago Legions won by 6 wickets
Brian Lara Cricket Academy, San Fernando
Umpires: Zahid Bassarath and Christopher Taylor

- Trinidad & Tobago Legions won the toss and elected to field first.

Match 12
4 May 2025
19:00 (N)
Scorecard

Guyana Rainforest Rangers; 189/5 (20 overs)	v	Leeward Islands Thunder; 137/8 (20 overs)
Kevlon Anderson 52 (45); Michael Palmer 2/19 (3 overs)		Nathan Edward 28 (32); Riyad Latiff 4/25 (4 overs)

Guyana Rainforest Rangers won by 52 runs
Brian Lara Cricket Academy, San Fernando
Umpires: Leslie Reifer and Lyndon Rajkumar

- Leeward Islands Thunder won the toss and elected to field first

Match 13
6 May 2025
14:00
Scorecard

Guyana Rainforest Rangers; 153/6 (20 overs)	v	Barbados Pelicans; 156/3 (16.2 overs)
Kevlon Anderson 69 (61); Kadeem Alleyne 2/19 (4 overs)		Shaqkere Parris 85* (46); Ronaldo Alimohamed 1/16 (2 overs)

Barbados Pelicans won by 7 wickets
Brian Lara Cricket Academy, San Fernando
Umpires: Deighton Butler and Lyndon Rajkumar

- Guyana Rainforest Rangers won the toss and elected to bat first.

Match 14
6 May 2025
19:00 (N)
Scorecard

Windward Islands Infernos; 211/6 (20 overs)	v	Jamaica Titans; 125 (18 overs)
Johann Jeremiah 97 (50); Jeavor Royal 2/19 (4 overs)		Deethmar Anderson 35 (27); Keon Gaston 2/14 (2 overs)

Windward Islands Infernos won by 86 runs
Brian Lara Cricket Academy, San Fernando
Umpires: Leslie Reifer and Carl Tuckett

- Windward Islands Infernos won the toss and elected to bat first.

Match 15
7 May 2025
19:00 (N)
Scorecard

Windward Islands Infernos; 158/8 (20 overs)	v	Leeward Islands Thunder; 121/7 (20 overs)
Ryan John 33 (20); Elroy Francis 3/16 (3 overs)		James Cornelius 38 (41); Avinash Mahabirsingh 2/18 (4 overs)

Windward Islands Infernos won by 37 runs
Brian Lara Cricket Academy, San Fernando
Umpires: Lyndon Rajkumar and Christopher Taylor

- Leeward Islands Thunder won the toss and elected to field first.

== Play-offs ==
Playoff			Final
			1	Trinidad & Tobago Legions	181/5 (20 overs)
2	Windward Islands Infernos	69 (14.5 overs)	3	Leeward Islands Thunder	164/9 (20 overs)
3	Leeward Islands Thunder	70/2 (9.1 overs)

=== Playoff ===
Playoff
9 May 2025
19:00 (N)
Scorecard

Windward Islands Infernos; 69 (14.5 overs)	v	Leeward Islands Thunder; 70/2 (9.1 overs)
Johann Jeremiah 14 (17); Anderson Mahase 4/10 (3.5 overs)		Kofi James 58 (34); Ryan John 2/29 (3 overs)

Leeward Islands Thunder won by 8 wickets
Brian Lara Cricket Academy, San Fernando
Umpires: Leslie Reifer and Zahid Bassarath

- Windward Islands Infernos won the toss and elected to bat first.

=== Final ===
Final
10 May 2025
19:00 (N)
Scorecard

Trinidad & Tobago Legions; 181/5 (20 overs)	v	Leeward Islands Thunder; 164/9 (20 overs)
Kamil Pooran 73 (44); Karima Gore 2/22 (4 overs)		Kofi James 63 (36); Jyd Goolie 3/13 (4 overs)

Trinidad & Tobago Legions won by 17 runs
Brian Lara Cricket Academy, San Fernando
Umpires: Leslie Reifer and Deighton Butler

- Leeward Islands Thunder won the toss and elected to field first.
