= South Africa A cricket team in the West Indies in 2025 =

International cricket tour

	West Indies A	South Africa A
- Dates: 21 May – 11 June 2025
Captains	Tevin Imlach (First-class); Jomel Warrican (First-class); Alick Athanaze (List A)	Marques Ackerman

FC series
- Result: South Africa A won the 2-match series 2–0
Most runs	Alick Athanaze (119)	Marques Ackerman (266)
Most wickets	Anderson Phillip (5)	Okuhle Cele (10)

LA series
- Result: South Africa A won the 3-match series 2–0
Most runs	Shaqkere Parris (104)	Sinethemba Qeshile (197)
Most wickets	Jediah Blades (6)	Tshepo Moreki (6)

The South Africa A cricket team is toured West Indies in May and June 2025 and to play against the West Indies A cricket team. The tour consisted of two first-class matches and three List A cricket matches.

== Squads ==
(Cricket West Indies) West Indies A		South Africa A
First-class	List A	First-class and List A
Tevin Imlach (c); Jomel Warrican (c); Ronaldo Alimohamed; Kevlon Anderson; Jewel Andrew; Alick Athanaze; Kraigg Brathwaite; John Campbell; Justin Greaves; Kavem Hodge; Shamar Joseph; Mikyle Louis; Johann Layne; Khary Pierre; Kemol Savory; Ojay Shields; Oshane Thomas; Gilon Tyson	Alick Athanaze (c); Kadeem Alleyne; Kevlon Anderson; Jediah Blades; Darel Cyrus; Jyd Goolie; Javelle Glen; Marquino Mindley; Shaqkere Parris; Khary Pierre; Kemol Savory; Oshane Thomas; Gilson Tyson; Kevin Wickham	Marques Ackerman (c); Okuhle Cele; Ruan de Swardt; Schalk Engelbrecht; Bjorn Fortuin; Jordan Hermann; Tristan Luus; Rivaldo Moonsamy; Tshepo Moreki; Mihlali Mpongwana; Nqaba Peter; Lhuan-dre Pretorius; Sinethemba Qeshile; Lesego Senokwane; Jason Smith; Prenelan Subrayen

== List A series ==
=== 1st Unofficial ODI ===
21 May 2025
14:30 (D/N)
Scorecard

South Africa A 283 (46.2 overs)	v	West Indies A 241 (44.1 overs)
Jason Smith 55 (44); Jediah Blades 3/39 (7 overs)		Kevlon Anderson 45 (47); Mihlali Mpongwana 3/37 (10 overs)

South Africa A won by 42 runs
Daren Sammy Cricket Ground, Gros Islet
Umpires: Ryan Banwarie (WI) and Jacqueline Williams (WI)

- West Indies A won the toss and elected to field.

=== 2nd Unofficial ODI ===
24 May 2025
14:30 (D/N)
Scorecard

South Africa A 365/7 (50 overs)	v	West Indies A 87/3 (13.1 overs)
Sinethemba Qeshile 126 (106); Jediah Blades 3/61 (10 overs)		Kevin Wickham 29 (30); Tshepo Moreki 2/29 (5 overs)

No result
Daren Sammy Cricket Ground, Gros Islet
Umpires: Christopher Taylor (WI) and Jacqueline Williams (WI)

- West Indies A won the toss and elected to field.
- No further play was possible due to rain.

=== 3rd Unofficial ODI ===
27 May 2025
14:30 (D/N)
Scorecard

West Indies A 253 (47.3 overs)	v	South Africa A 258/4 (34.5 overs)
Shaqkere Parris 96 (111); Okuhle Cele 3/29 (8.3 overs)		Rivaldo Moonsamy 94 (91); Ojay Shields 2/44 (5 overs)

South Africa A won by 6 wickets
Daren Sammy Cricket Ground, Gros Islet
Umpires: Ryan Banwarie (WI) and Christopher Taylor (WI)

- West Indies A won the toss and elected to bat.

== First-class series ==
=== 1st Unofficial Test ===
1–4 June 2025
Scorecard

West Indies A	v	South Africa A
240 (63.4 overs); Tevin Imlach 61 (105); Okuhle Cele 5/43 (12.5 overs)		600/7d (112.3 overs); Marques Ackerman 209 (170); Ronaldo Alimohamed 2/88 (22.3 overs)
272 (79.4 overs); Kevlon Anderson 52 (101); Prenelan Subrayen 5/82 (30 overs)

South Africa A won by an innings and 88 runs
Daren Sammy Cricket Ground, Gros Islet
Umpires: Zahid Bassarath (WI) and Leslie Reifer (WI)

- South Africa A won the toss and elected to field.

=== 2nd Unofficial Test ===
8–11 June 2025
Scorecard

West Indies A	v	South Africa A
220 (68.1 overs); Alick Athanaze 65 (94); Ruan de Swardt 4/62 (18.1 overs)		332 (106.2 overs); Ruan de Swardt 86 (145); Anderson Phillip 5/67 (24.2 overs)
211 (54.4 overs); John Campbell 59 (86); Mihlali Mpongwana 4/52 (12 overs)		100/3 (19.3 overs); Marques Ackerman 35* (35); Shamar Joseph 2/40 (7 overs)

South Africa A won by 7 wickets
Daren Sammy Cricket Ground, Gros Islet
Umpires: Zahid Bassarath (WI) and Christopher Taylor (WI)

- South Africa A won the toss and elected to field.
