= Australian cricket team in the West Indies in 2025 =

International cricket tour

	West Indies	Australia
- Dates: 25 June – 28 July 2025
Captains	Roston Chase (Tests); Shai Hope (T20Is)	Pat Cummins (Tests); Mitchell Marsh (T20Is)

Test series
- Result: Australia won the 3-match series 3–0
Most runs	Brandon King (129)	Travis Head (224)
Most wickets	Shamar Joseph (22)	Mitchell Starc (15)
- Player of the series: Mitchell Starc (Aus)

Twenty20 International series
- Results: Australia won the 5-match series 5–0
Most runs	Shai Hope (185)	Cameron Green (205)
Most wickets	Jason Holder (7)	Ben Dwarshuis (8); Adam Zampa (8)
- Player of the series: Cameron Green (Aus)

The Australian cricket team toured the West Indies in June and July 2025 to play the West Indies cricket team. The tour consisted of three Test and five Twenty20 International (T20I) matches.. The Test series formed part of the 2025–2027 ICC World Test Championship. In February 2025, the Cricket West Indies (CWI) confirmed the fixtures for the tour, as a part of the 2025 home international season. Australia also never lost a game in this tour.

In March 2025, Cricket West Indies decided that the third Test of the series would be played as day-night Test at Sabina Park.

Australia registered their first-ever T20I series win in the West Indies.

== Squads ==
West Indies		Australia	
Tests	T20Is	Tests	T20Is
Roston Chase (c); Jomel Warrican (vc); Kevlon Anderson; Kraigg Brathwaite; John Campbell; Keacy Carty; Justin Greaves; Shai Hope (wk); Tevin Imlach (wk); Alzarri Joseph; Shamar Joseph; Brandon King; Johann Layne; Mikyle Louis; Anderson Phillip; Jayden Seales	Shai Hope (c, wk); Jewel Andrew; Jediah Blades; Keacy Carty (Note: In squad for fifth T20I only.); Roston Chase; Matthew Forde; Shimron Hetmyer; Jason Holder; Akeal Hosein; Alzarri Joseph; Brandon King; Evin Lewis; Gudakesh Motie; Rovman Powell; Andre Russell (Note: In squad for first and second T20I only.); Sherfane Rutherford; Romario Shepherd	Pat Cummins (c); Steve Smith (vc); Sean Abbott; Scott Boland; Alex Carey (wk); Cameron Green; Josh Hazlewood; Travis Head; Josh Inglis (wk); Usman Khawaja; Sam Konstas; Matthew Kuhnemann; Marnus Labuschagne; Nathan Lyon; Mitchell Starc; Beau Webster	Mitchell Marsh (c); Sean Abbott; Xavier Bartlett; Cooper Connolly; Tim David; Ben Dwarshuis; Nathan Ellis; Jake Fraser-McGurk; Cameron Green; Aaron Hardie; ~~Josh Hazlewood~~; Josh Inglis (wk); ~~Spencer Johnson~~; Matthew Kuhnemann; Glenn Maxwell; Mitchell Owen; ~~Matthew Short~~; Adam Zampa

Australia ruled Steve Smith out of the first Test due to a finger injury he got while dropping a catch in the 2025 World Test Championship final. Australia also named Brendan Doggett as a travelling reserve for the Test series. On 15 June, Doggett was ruled out of the Test series due to a hip injury, with Sean Abbott named as his replacement. On June 20th, it was confirmed that Marnus Labuschagne had been left out of the squad for the first Test against the West Indies, while Steven Smith had been sidelined due to injury. Sam Konstas and Josh Inglis were named as their replacements. On 12 July, Spencer Johnson and Josh Hazlewood were withdrawals from the T20I squad, with Xavier Bartlett and Jake Fraser-McGurk named as their replacements. On 20 July, Matthew Short was ruled out of the T20I series due to a side strain.

On 28 July, Evin Lewis was ruled out of the fifth T20I due to injury, Keacy Carty named as his replacement.

== Test series ==
=== 1st Test ===
25–27 June 2025
Scorecard

Australia	v	West Indies
180 (56.5 overs); Travis Head 59 (78); Jayden Seales 5/60 (15.5 overs)		190 (63.2 overs); Shai Hope 48 (91); Mitchell Starc 3/65 (16 overs)
310 (81.5 overs); Alex Carey 65 (75); Shamar Joseph 5/87 (25.5 overs)		141 (33.4 overs); Shamar Joseph 44 (22); Josh Hazlewood 5/43 (12 overs)

Australia won by 159 runs
Kensington Oval, Bridgetown
Umpires: Richard Kettleborough (Eng) and Nitin Menon (Ind)
Player of the match: Travis Head (Aus)

- Australia won the toss and elected to bat.
- Brandon King (WI) made his Test debut.
- Roston Chase (WI) captained West Indies for the first time in Tests.
- Pat Cummins (Aus) overtook Richie Benaud and now trails only Imran Khan for the most Test wickets taken by a captain.
- World Test Championship points: Australia 12, West Indies 0.

=== 2nd Test ===
3–6 July 2025
Scorecard

Australia	v	West Indies
286 (66.5 overs); Alex Carey 63 (81); Alzarri Joseph 4/61 (15.5 overs)		253 (73.2 overs); Brandon King 75 (108); Nathan Lyon 3/75 (19 overs)
243 (71.3 overs); Steve Smith 71 (119); Shamar Joseph 4/66 (16 overs)		143 (34.3 overs); Roston Chase 34 (41); Mitchell Starc 3/24 (8 overs)

Australia won by 133 runs
National Cricket Stadium, St. George's
Umpires: Adrian Holdstock (SA) and Richard Kettleborough (Eng)
Player of the match: Alex Carey (Aus)

- Australia won the toss and elected to bat.
- Kraigg Brathwaite (WI) played in his 100th Test match.
- World Test Championship points: Australia 12, West Indies 0.

=== 3rd Test ===
12–14 July 2025 (D/N)
Scorecard

Australia	v	West Indies
225 (70.3 overs); Steve Smith 48 (66); Shamar Joseph 4/33 (17.3 overs)		143 (52.1 overs); John Campbell 36 (65); Scott Boland 3/34 (13.1 overs)
121 (37 overs); Cameron Green 42 (66); Alzarri Joseph 5/27 (12 overs)		27 (14.3 overs); Justin Greaves 11 (24); Mitchell Starc 6/9 (7.3 overs)

Australia won by 176 runs
Sabina Park, Kingston
Umpires: Adrian Holdstock (SA) and Nitin Menon (Ind)
Player of the match: Mitchell Starc (Aus)

- Australia won the toss and elected to bat.
- Kevlon Anderson (WI) made his Test debut.
- Mitchell Starc (Aus) played in his 100th Test match.
- Shamar Joseph (WI) took his 50th wicket in Tests.
- Mitchell Starc (Aus) took his 400th wicket in Tests. He also took the fastest five-wicket haul in Tests (15 balls).
- Scott Boland (Aus) took his first hat-trick in Tests.
- West Indies recorded their lowest team total in Tests and the second lowest overall.
- World Test Championship points: Australia 12, West Indies 0.

== T20I series ==
=== 1st T20I ===
20 July 2025
19:00 (N)
Scorecard

West Indies; 189/8 (20 overs)	v	Australia; 190/7 (18.5 overs)
Roston Chase 60 (32); Ben Dwarshuis 4/36 (4 overs)		Cameron Green 51 (26); Gudakesh Motie 2/29 (4 overs)

Australia won by 3 wickets
Sabina Park, Kingston
Umpires: Zahid Bassarath (WI) and Leslie Reifer (WI)
Player of the match: Mitchell Owen (Aus)

- Australia won the toss and elected to field.
- Mitchell Owen (Aus) made his T20I debut.
- Shai Hope and Shimron Hetmyer (WI) both scored their 1,000th run in T20Is.

=== 2nd T20I ===
22 July 2025
19:00 (N)
Scorecard

West Indies; 172/8 (20 overs)	v	Australia; 173/2 (15.2 overs)
Brandon King 51 (36); Adam Zampa 3/29 (4 overs)		Josh Inglis 78* (33); Jason Holder 1/28 (3 overs)

Australia won by 8 wickets
Sabina Park, Kingston
Umpires: Gregory Brathwaite (WI) and Deighton Butler (WI)
Player of the match: Josh Inglis (Aus)

- Australia won the toss and elected to field.
- Matthew Kuhnemann (Aus) made his T20I debut.
- Andre Russell (WI) played in his last T20I match.

=== 3rd T20I ===
25 July 2025
19:00 (N)
Scorecard

West Indies; 214/4 (20 overs)	v	Australia; 215/4 (16.1 overs)
Shai Hope 102* (57); Mitchell Owen 1/23 (2 overs)		Tim David 102* (37); Romario Shepherd 2/39 (3.1 overs)

Australia won by 6 wickets
Warner Park Sporting Complex, Basseterre
Umpires: Zahid Bassarath (WI) and Deighton Butler (WI)
Player of the match: Tim David (Aus)

- Australia won the toss and elected to field.
- Jediah Blades (WI) made his T20I debut.
- Shai Hope (WI) and Tim David (Aus) both scored their maiden century in T20Is.
- Tim David scored the fastest fifty (16 balls) and century (37 balls) for Australia in T20Is.

=== 4th T20I ===
26 July 2025
19:00 (N)
Scorecard

West Indies; 205/9 (20 overs)	v	Australia; 206/7 (19.2 overs)
Sherfane Rutherford 31 (15); Adam Zampa 3/54 (4 overs)		Cameron Green 55* (35); Jediah Blades 3/29 (4 overs)

Australia won by 3 wickets
Warner Park Sporting Complex, Basseterre
Umpires: Gregory Brathwaite (WI) and Leslie Reifer (WI)
Player of the match: Glenn Maxwell (Aus)

- Australia won the toss and elected to field.

=== 5th T20I ===
28 July 2025
19:00 (N)
Scorecard

West Indies; 170 (19.4 overs)	v	Australia; 173/7 (17 overs)
Shimron Hetmyer 52 (31); Ben Dwarshuis 3/41 (4 overs)		Mitchell Owen 37 (17); Akeal Hosein 3/17 (4 overs)

Australia won by 3 wickets
Warner Park Sporting Complex, Basseterre
Umpires: Zahid Bassarath (WI) and Leslie Reifer (WI)
Player of the match: Ben Dwarshuis (Aus)

- Australia won the toss and elected to field.
