= Bangladeshi cricket team in the West Indies in 2024–25 =

International cricket tour

	West Indies	Bangladesh
- Dates: 22 November – 19 December 2024
Captains	Kraigg Brathwaite (Tests) Shai Hope (ODIs) Rovman Powell (T20Is)	Mehidy Miraz (Tests & ODIs) Litton Das (T20Is)

Test series
- Result: 2-match series drawn 1–1
Most runs	Alick Athanaze (139); Justin Greaves (139)	Jaker Ali (176)
Most wickets	Jayden Seales (10)	Taskin Ahmed (11)
- Player of the series: Jayden Seales (WI); Taskin Ahmed (Ban)

One Day International series
- Results: West Indies won the 3-match series 3–0
Most runs	Sherfane Rutherford (167)	Mahmudullah (196)
Most wickets	Jayden Seales (5)	Rishad Hossain (4)
- Player of the series: Sherfane Rutherford (WI)

Twenty20 International series
- Results: Bangladesh won the 3-match series 3–0
Most runs	Rovman Powell (68)	Jaker Ali (120)
Most wickets	Akeal Hosein (3); Roston Chase (3); Gudakesh Motie (3); Romario Shepherd (3); Obed McCoy (3)	Mahedi Hasan (8)
- Player of the series: Mahedi Hasan (Ban)

The Bangladesh cricket team toured the West Indies in November and December 2024 to play two Test, three One Day International (ODI) and three Twenty20 International (T20I) matches against the West Indies team. The Test series formed part of the 2023–2025 ICC World Test Championship. In May 2024, Cricket West Indies (CWI) confirmed the fixtures for the tour, as a part of the 2024–25 home international season.

== Squads ==
West Indies			Bangladesh		
Tests	ODIs	T20Is	Tests	ODIs	T20Is
Kraigg Brathwaite (c); Joshua Da Silva (vc, wk); Alick Athanaze; Keacy Carty; Justin Greaves; Kavem Hodge; Tevin Imlach (wk); Alzarri Joseph; Shamar Joseph; Mikyle Louis; Anderson Phillip; Kemar Roach; Jayden Seales; Kevin Sinclair; Jomel Warrican	Shai Hope (c, wk); Brandon King (vc); Jediah Blades; Keacy Carty; Roston Chase; ~~Matthew Forde~~; Justin Greaves; Shimron Hetmyer; Amir Jangoo (wk); Alzarri Joseph; ~~Shamar Joseph~~; Evin Lewis; Marquino Mindley; Gudakesh Motie; Sherfane Rutherford; Jayden Seales; Romario Shepherd	Rovman Powell (c); Brandon King (vc); Keacy Carty; Johnson Charles; Roston Chase; Justin Greaves; Terrance Hinds; Akeal Hosein (Note: In squad for first and second T20I only.); Alzarri Joseph; Evin Lewis; Obed McCoy; Gudakesh Motie; Nicholas Pooran (wk); Jayden Seales (Note: In squad for third T20I only.); Romario Shepherd; Shamar Springer	Mehidy Hasan Miraz (c); ~~Najmul Hossain Shanto (c)~~; Taskin Ahmed; Jaker Ali; Mahidul Islam Ankon; Litton Das (wk); Zakir Hasan; Mominul Haque; Shahadat Hossain; Shadman Islam; Shoriful Islam; Taijul Islam; Mahmudul Hasan Joy; Hasan Mahmud; Hasan Murad; Nahid Rana	Mehidy Hasan Miraz (c); Nasum Ahmed; Taskin Ahmed; Jaker Ali; Litton Das (wk); Tanzid Hasan; Afif Hossain; Parvez Hossain Emon; Rishad Hossain; Shoriful Islam; Hasan Mahmud; Mahmudullah; Tanzim Hasan Sakib; Soumya Sarkar; Nahid Rana	Litton Das (c, wk); Nasum Ahmed; Taskin Ahmed; Jaker Ali; Mahedi Hasan; Tanzid Hasan; Afif Hossain; Parvez Hossain Emon; Rishad Hossain; Shamim Hossain; Hasan Mahmud; Mehidy Hasan Miraz; Ripon Mondol; Tanzim Hasan Sakib; Soumya Sarkar; Nahid Rana

On 11 November, captain Najmul Hossain Shanto was ruled out of the Test squad due to a groin injury, with Shahadat Hossain named as his replacement, and Mehidy Hasan Miraz announced as captain. On 15 December, Bangladesh added Nahid Rana to the T20I squad. On 18 December, Soumya Sarkar was ruled out of the third T20I due to finger injury.

On 5 December, West Indies added Marquino Mindley and Jediah Blades into the ODI squad as replacement for the injured Matthew Forde and Shamar Joseph.

== Tour match ==
=== 2-day warm-up match ===
17–18 November 2024
Scorecard

Bangladesh	v	West Indies Select XI
253/7d (73.2 overs); Jaker Ali 48* (110); Chaim Holder 2/48 (17 overs)		87/9 (27.4 overs); Kimani Melius 23 (30); Hasan Murad 3/1 (1.4 overs)

Match drawn
Coolidge Cricket Ground, Saint George
Umpires: Felix Auguiste (WI) and Bernard Joseph (WI)

- Bangladesh won the toss and elected to bat.

== Test series ==
=== 1st Test ===
22–26 November 2024
Scorecard

West Indies	v	Bangladesh
450/9d (144.1 overs); Justin Greaves 115* (206); Hasan Mahmud 3/87 (27 overs)		269/9d (98 overs); Jaker Ali 53 (89); Alzarri Joseph 3/69 (25 overs)
152 (46.1 overs); Alick Athanaze 42 (63); Taskin Ahmed 6/64 (14.1 overs)		132 (38 overs); Mehidy Hasan Miraz 45 (46); Kemar Roach 3/20 (8 overs)

West Indies won by 201 runs
Sir Vivian Richards Stadium, North Sound
Umpires: Kumar Dharmasena (SL) and Nitin Menon (Ind)
Player of the match: Justin Greaves (WI)

- Bangladesh won the toss and elected to field.
- Mehidy Hasan Miraz captained Bangladesh in Tests for the first time and played in his 50th Test match.
- Justin Greaves (WI) scored his first century in Tests.
- World Test Championship points: West Indies 12, Bangladesh 0.

=== 2nd Test ===
30 November – 3 December 2024
Scorecard

Bangladesh	v	West Indies
164 (71.5 overs); Shadman Islam 64 (137); Jayden Seales 4/5 (15.5 overs)		146 (65 overs); Keacy Carty 40 (115); Nahid Rana 5/61 (18 overs)
268 (59.5 overs); Jaker Ali 91 (106); Kemar Roach 3/36 (10 overs)		185 (50 overs); Kavem Hodge 55 (75); Taijul Islam 5/50 (17 overs)

Bangladesh won by 101 runs
Sabina Park, Kingston
Umpires: Kumar Dharmasena (SL) and Asif Yaqoob (Pak)
Player of the match: Taijul Islam (Ban)

- Bangladesh won the toss and elected to bat.
- No play was possible before Tea on Day 1 due to rain and wet outfield.
- Nahid Rana (Ban) took his first five-wicket haul in Tests.
- Bangladesh's victory was their first in the West Indies since 2009 and meant they won three Tests away from home in a calendar year for the first time, having beaten Pakistan twice earlier in 2024.
- World Test Championship points: Bangladesh 12, West Indies 0.

== ODI series ==
=== 1st ODI ===
8 December 2024
09:30
Scorecard

Bangladesh; 294/6 (50 overs)	v	West Indies; 295/5 (47.4 overs)
Mehidy Hasan Miraz 74 (101); Romario Shepherd 3/51 (10 overs)		Sherfane Rutherford 113 (80); Soumya Sarkar 1/24 (2 overs)

West Indies won by 5 wickets
Warner Park Sporting Complex, Basseterre
Umpires: Kumar Dharmasena (SL) and Leslie Reifer (WI)
Player of the match: Sherfane Rutherford (WI)

- Bangladesh won the toss and elected to bat.
- Sherfane Rutherford (WI) scored his first century in ODIs.

=== 2nd ODI ===
10 December 2024
09:30
Scorecard

Bangladesh; 227 (45.5 overs)	v	West Indies; 230/3 (36.5 overs)
Mahmudullah 62 (92); Jayden Seales 4/22 (9 overs)		Brandon King 82 (76); Afif Hossain 1/12 (3 overs)

West Indies won by 7 wickets
Warner Park Sporting Complex, Basseterre
Umpires: Gregory Brathwaite (WI) and Asif Yaqoob (Pak)
Player of the match: Jayden Seales (WI)

- West Indies won the toss and elected to field.
- Marquino Mindley (WI) made his ODI debut.

=== 3rd ODI ===
12 December 2024
09:30
Scorecard

Bangladesh; 321/5 (50 overs)	v	West Indies; 325/6 (45.5 overs)
Mahmudullah 84* (63); Alzarri Joseph 2/43 (10 overs)		Amir Jangoo 104* (83); Rishad Hossain 2/69 (8.5 overs)

West Indies won by 4 wickets
Warner Park Sporting Complex, Basseterre
Umpires: Kumar Dharmasena (SL) and Leslie Reifer (WI)
Player of the match: Amir Jangoo (WI)

- West Indies won the toss and elected to field.
- Jediah Blades and Amir Jangoo (WI) both made their ODI debuts.
- Amir Jangoo became the second West Indian player to score a century on ODI debut.

== T20I series ==
=== 1st T20I ===
15 December 2024
20:00 (N)
Scorecard

Bangladesh; 147/6 (20 overs)	v	West Indies; 140 (19.5 overs)
Soumya Sarkar 43 (32); Akeal Hosein 2/13 (4 overs)		Rovman Powell 60 (35); Mahedi Hasan 4/13 (4 overs)

Bangladesh won by 7 runs
Arnos Vale Stadium, Kingstown
Umpires: Deighton Butler (WI) and Leslie Reifer (WI)
Player of the match: Mahedi Hasan (Ban)

- West Indies won the toss and elected to field.

=== 2nd T20I ===
17 December 2024
20:00 (N)
Scorecard

Bangladesh; 129/7 (20 overs)	v	West Indies; 102 (18.3 overs)
Shamim Hossain 35* (17); Gudakesh Motie 2/25 (4 overs)		Roston Chase 32 (34); Taskin Ahmed 3/16 (3.3 overs)

Bangladesh won by 27 runs
Arnos Vale Stadium, Kingstown
Umpires: Zahid Bassarath (WI) and Gregory Brathwaite (WI)
Player of the match: Shamim Hossain (Ban)

- West Indies won the toss and elected to field.

=== 3rd T20I ===
19 December 2024
20:00 (N)
Scorecard

Bangladesh; 189/7 (20 overs)	v	West Indies; 109 (16.4 overs)
Jaker Ali 72* (41); Romario Shepherd 2/30 (4 overs)		Romario Shepherd 33 (27); Rishad Hossain 3/21 (4 overs)

Bangladesh won by 80 runs
Arnos Vale Stadium, Kingstown
Umpires: Deighton Butler (WI) and Leslie Reifer (WI)
Player of the match: Jaker Ali (Ban)

- Bangladesh won the toss and elected to bat.
- Justin Greaves and Jayden Seales (WI) both made their T20I debuts.
