= List of Caribbean Premier League cricket five-wicket hauls =

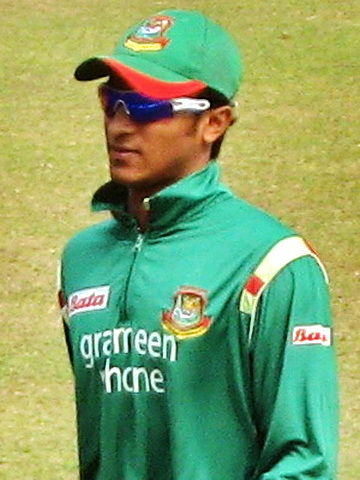
Shakib Al Hasan took the first five-wicket haul and has the best bowling figures in the CPL.

The Caribbean Premier League (abbreviated to CPL or CPLT20) is an annual Twenty20 cricket tournament held in the Caribbean. It was founded by Cricket West Indies in 2013 to replace the Caribbean Twenty20 as the premier Twenty20 competition in the Caribbean. It is currently sponsored by Republic Bank Limited and consequently officially named the Republic Bank CPL. The inaugural tournament was won by the Jamaica Tallawahs, who defeated the Guyana Amazon Warriors in the final.

In cricket, a five-wicket haul (also known as a "five-for" or "fifer") refers to a bowler taking five or more wickets in a single innings. This is regarded as a notable achievement. The first five-wicket haul was taken by Shakib Al Hasan of the Barbados Tridents against the Trinidad & Tobago Red Steel on 3 August 2013. Shakib captured 6 wickets for 6 runs, which was also the best bowling figures in an innings by a player in this competition. The most recent five-wicket haul was taken by Rahkeem Cornwall of the Barbados Royals against the St Kitts and Nevis Patriots on 17 September 2024. Sohail Tanvir's fifer for 3 runs was the most economical five-wicket haul, who picked up five wickets with an economy rate of 0.75 and bowling average of 0.60, against the Barbados Tridents, on 29 August 2017. David Wiese of the Guyana Amazon Warriors took the least economical five-wicket haul, bowling at an economic rate of 9.75. Among the West Indians, Fidel Edwards of the Trinidad & Tobago Red Steel was the first bowler to pick up a five-wicket haul in this tournament.

Shakib Al Hasan is also the youngest player to claim a five-wicket haul in this competition, when he bagged a five-for the first time in the CPL, at the age of 26. On the other hand, on 26 September 2019, Hayden Walsh Jr. became the youngest native player to pick up a five-wicket haul in the Caribbean Premier League, when he claimed 5 wickets for 15 runs, at the age of 27.

The 2021 season saw three five-wicket hauls, the most in a season. Two five-wicket hauls were taken in each of 2013 and 2015 seasons. No bowler could take a five-for in the 2014, 2016, 2022 and 2023 seasons. Dwayne Bravo is the only player to take a five-wicket haul while captaining his side. Bravo captained the Trinidad & Tobago Red Steel, and picked up 5 wickets for 23 runs, on 24 July 2015 against the Jamaica Tallawahs.

== Key ==
Key
Symbol	Meaning
†	The bowler was man of the match
Date	Day on which the match was held
Inn	Innings in which the five-wicket haul was taken
Overs	Number of overs bowled
Runs	Number of runs conceded
Wkts	Number of wickets taken
Econ	Average runs conceded per over
Batsmen	Batsmen whose wickets were taken
Result	Result for the team for which the five-wicket haul was taken

== Five-wicket hauls ==
Caribbean Premier League five-wicket hauls
No.	Bowler	Date	Ground	Team	Opposing team	Overs	Runs	Wkts	Result
1	Shakib Al Hasan †	3 August 2013	Kensington Oval, Bridgetown	Barbados Tridents	Trinidad & Tobago Red Steel	4	6	6	Won
2	Fidel Edwards	3 August 2013	Kensington Oval, Bridgetown	Trinidad & Tobago Red Steel	Barbados Tridents	4	22	5	Lost
3	David Wiese (1/3)	18 July 2015	Providence Stadium, Providence	Guyana Amazon Warriors	Barbados Tridents	4	30	5	Lost
4	Dwayne Bravo	23 July 2015	Queen's Park Oval, Port of Spain	Trinidad & Tobago Red Steel	Jamaica Tallawahs	4	23	5	Won
5	Sohail Tanvir †	29 August 2017	Kensington Oval, Bridgetown	Guyana Amazon Warriors	Barbados Tridents	4	3	5	Won
6	Raymon Reifer †	13 August 2018	Providence Stadium, Providence	Barbados Tridents	Guyana Amazon Warriors	4	20	5	Won
7	Hayden Walsh Jr.	26 September 2019	Kensington Oval, Bridgetown	Barbados Tridents	Trinbago Knight Riders	4	19	5	Won
8	Mohammad Nabi	27 August 2020	Queen's Park Oval, Port of Spain	Saint Lucia Zouks	St Kitts & Nevis Patriots	4	15	5	Won
9	Isuru Udana †	27 August 2021	Warner Park Sporting Complex, Basseterre	Trinbago Knight Riders	Barbados Royals	4	21	5	Won
10	David Wiese † (2/3)	11 September 2021	Warner Park Sporting Complex, Basseterre	Saint Lucia Kings	Barbados Royals	4	25	5	Won
11	David Wiese † (3/3)	14 September 2021	Warner Park Sporting Complex, Basseterre	Saint Lucia Kings	Trinbago Knight Riders	4	39	5	Won
12	Rahkeem Cornwall †	17 September 2024	Kensington Oval, Bridgetown	Barbados Royals	St Kitts & Nevis Patriots	4	16	5	Won
13	Imran Tahir † (1/2)	22 August 2025	Sir Vivian Richards Stadium, North Sound	Guyana Amazon Warriors	Antigua & Barbuda Falcons	4	21	5	Won
14	Gudakesh Motie	14 September 2025	Providence Stadium, Providence	Guyana Amazon Warriors	Barbados Royals	3.2	21	5	Won
15	Matthew Forde †	21 August 2026	Daren Sammy Cricket Ground, Gros Islet	Saint Lucia Kings	Jamaica Kingsmen	4	23	5	Won
16	Jeremiah Louis	3 September 2026	Warner Park Sporting Complex, Basseterre	St Kitts & Nevis Patriots	Saint Lucia Kings	2.5	10	5	Won
17	Imran Tahir † (2/2)	9 September 2029	Providence Stadium, Providence	Guyana Amazon Warriors	Saint Lucia Kings	4	17	5	Won

== Season overview ==
Season wise statistics for five wicket hauls
Year	No. of bowlers	No. of five wicket hauls	Best bowling figures	Best bowler	Ref
2013	2	2	6/6	Shakib Al Hasan	
2014	0	0	4/11	Krishmar Santokie	
2015	2	2	5/23	Dwayne Bravo	
2016	0	0	4/13	Dwayne Bravo	
2017	1	1	5/3	Sohail Tanvir	
2018	1	1	5/20	Raymon Reifer	
2019	1	1	5/19	Hayden Walsh Jr.	
2020	1	1	5/15	Mohammad Nabi	
2021	2	3	5/21	Isuru Udana	
2022	0	0	4/4	Kyle Mayers	
2023	0	0	4/14	Waqar Salamkheil	
2024	1	1	5/16	Rahkeem Cornwall	
2025	2	2	5/21	Gudakesh Motie	
