= Johann Jeremiah =

Grenedian cricketer (born 1999)

Personal information
- Full name: Johann Francis Jeremiah
- Born: 2 December 1999 (age 26); Grenada
- Batting: Left-handed
- Bowling: Right-arm off break
- Role: Batsman

Domestic team information
- Years: Team
- 2022–present: Windward Islands
- 2024–present: St Lucia Kings
- 2025: Windward Islands Infernos

Career statistics
Competition	FC	LA	T20
Matches	15	12	1
Runs scored	815	293	1
Batting average	30.18	26.63	–
100s/50s	1/5	0/2	0/0
Top score	107	82	1*
Catches/stumpings	13/0	7/0	0/0
- Source: ESPNcricinfo, 18 April 2025

Johann Jeremiah (born 2 December 1999) is a Grenadian cricketer, who is a left-handed batsman. He plays for the Windward Islands cricket team in domestic cricket.

== Career ==
Jeremiah was the leading run-scorer in the 2019 Windward Islands Cricket Tournament, scoring 198 runs in 4 matches. In October 2022, he was named in Windward Islands' squad for the 2022–23 Super50 Cup. He made his List A debut for Windward Islands on 12 November 2022, against Trinidad and Tobago.

In March 2023, he was also selected to play in the 2022–23 West Indies Championship. He made his first-class for Windward Islands on 15 March 2023, against Jamaica.

In July 2024, he was picked by the Saint Lucia Kings to play for them in the 2024 Caribbean Premier League. He made his Twenty20 debut on 2 October 2024, against Guyana Amazon Warriors during the tournament. In March 2025, he was named in Windward Islands Infernos' squad for the inaugural season of the West Indies Breakout League.
