= West Indies Breakout League =

Cricket Tournament for emerging players

- Countries: West Indies
- Administrator: Cricket West Indies; Caribbean Premier League
- Format: Twenty20
- First edition: 2025
- Tournament format: Single round-robin and playoffs
- Number of teams: 6
- Website: Windies Cricket

The West Indies Breakout League is a Twenty20 cricket tournament that is held in the West Indies, established by Cricket West Indies (CWI) and Caribbean Premier League (CPL). The inaugural season of the tournament began in April 2025 in Trinidad and Tobago. The creation of the tournament aims to display emerging talent from across the region.

== Format ==
The tournament will focus on young players with limited professional experience (no more than 40 Twenty20 matches and 10 Twenty20 International matches). The tournament will be played in a single round-robin format with the top three teams advancing to the playoffs.

== Teams ==
Team	Captain	Head coach
Barbados Pelicans		
Guyana Rainforest Rangers		
Jamaica Titans		
Leeward Islands Thunder		
Trinidad & Tobago Legions		
Windward Islands Infernos		

== Tournament results ==
Season	Venue	Final			Matches	Teams
Season	Venue	Winner	Result	Runner-up	Matches	Teams
2025	Brian Lara Cricket Academy, San Fernando, Trinidad and Tobago	Trinidad & Tobago Legions	Trinidad & Tobago Legions won by 17 runs	Leeward Islands Thunder	17	6
