= Jaker Ali =

Bangladeshi cricketer (born 1998)

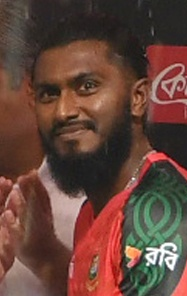
- Ali in 2025

Personal information
- Full name: Jaker Ali Anik
- Born: 22 February 1998 (age 28); Habiganj, Bangladesh
- Batting: Right-handed
- Role: Wicket-keeper Batter

International information
- National side: Bangladesh (2023-present)
- Test debut (cap 105): 21 October 2024 v South Africa
- Last Test: 17 June 2025 v Sri Lanka
- ODI debut (cap 149): 9 November 2024 v Afghanistan
- Last ODI: 11 October 2025 v Afghanistan
- T20I debut (cap 81): 4 October 2023 v Malaysia
- Last T20I: 5 October 2025 v Afghanistan

Career statistics
Competition	Test	ODI	T20I	FC
Matches	6	12	45	55
Runs scored	337	394	710	3,199
Batting average	30.63	39.40	26.29	39.98
100s/50s	0/4	0/3	0/3	4/23
Top score	91	68	72*	172
Catches/stumpings	9/1	5/1	21/3	123/14
Medal record
Men's cricket
Representing Bangladesh
Asian Games
Bronze medal – third place	2022 Hangzhou	Team
- Source: ESPNcricinfo, 25 October 2025

Jaker Ali Anik (born 22 February 1998) is a Bangladeshi cricketer. He is a right-handed batter and wicket-keeper who is the current vice-captain of the Bangladesh cricket team in T20I cricket.

== Domestic Cricket ==
He made his first-class debut for Sylhet Division in the 2016–17 National Cricket League on 27 December 2016. Prior to his first-class debut, he was part of Bangladesh's youth squad for the 2016 Under-19 Cricket World Cup.

He made his List A debut for Prime Doleshwar Sporting Club in the 2016–17 Dhaka Premier Division Cricket League on 26 April 2017.

In October 2018, he was named in the squad for the Sylhet Sixers, following the draft for the 2018–19 Bangladesh Premier League. He made his Twenty20 debut for the Sylhet Sixers in the 2018–19 Bangladesh Premier League on 16 January 2019. In November 2019, he was selected to play for the Dhaka Platoon in the 2019–20 Bangladesh Premier League.

== International career ==
=== 2023-2024 ===
In March 2023, he earned his maiden call-up to the Bangladesh cricket team for their T20I series against Ireland.

=== 2024-2025 ===
In May 2024, he was named in Bangladesh's squad for the 2024 ICC Men's T20 World Cup tournament.

In December 2024, during the Bangladesh tour of West Indies, he hit 9 sixes in the T20 series which is the most by a Bangladeshi in any bilateral T20 series. Overall, he hit 21 sixes in 2024, which is the most joint highest sixes in a calendar year for Bangladesh, along with Tawhid Hridoy. In the 3rd T20 against WI, he hit 6 sixes in an innings for the second time in his career. No other Bangladeshi cricketer has hit this many sixes in an innings. In the same match, he came up to bat at number 5 and scored an unbeaten 72, the highest score in that batting position by a Bangladeshi batsman. He was also the highest run scorer in the Tests as well as in the T20 series against the West Indies.

=== 2025-2026 ===
In January 2025, he was named in Bangladesh's squad for the 2025 ICC Champions Trophy in which he scored 68 and 45 against India and New Zealand, respectively.
