= Mikkel Govia =

West Indies cricketer (born 2002)

Personal information
- Full name: Mikkel Govia
- Born: 22 January 2002 (age 24); Trinidad
- Batting: Right-handed
- Bowling: Right-arm off-break
- Role: Bowler

Domestic team information
- Years: Team
- 2024: Saint Lucia Kings
- 2024: Combined Campuses and Colleges

Career statistics
Competition	LA	T20
Matches	5	3
Runs scored	58	-
Batting average	14.50	-
100s/50s	-/-	-/-
Top score	22	-
Balls bowled	63	-
Wickets	8	2
Bowling average	25.50	41.00
5 wickets in innings	-	-
10 wickets in match	-	-
Best bowling	4/42	1/18
Catches/stumpings	3/-	2/-
- Source: ESPNcricinfo, 13 February 2025

Mikkel Govia (born 22 January 2002) is a West Indian cricketer who currently plays for the Combined Campuses and Colleges cricket team as a bowler.

== Career ==
In September 2024, he made his Twenty20 debut playing for the Saint Lucia Kings against St Kitts and Nevis Patriots in the 2024 Caribbean Premier League. In October 2024, he made his List A debut for the Combined Campuses and Colleges cricket team against Trinidad and Tobago national cricket team in the 2024–25 Super50 Cup.
