= Shaqkere Parris =

West Indian cricketer (born 2003)

Personal information
- Full name: Shaqkere Delano Parris
- Born: 15 July 2003 (age 23)
- Batting: Right-handed
- Role: Top-order batter

Domestic team information
- Years: Team
- 2023–Present: Combined Campuses and Colleges
- 2024: Trinbago Knight Riders
- 2025: Barbados Pelicans
- 2025–Present: Barbados Royals

Career statistics
Competition	FC	LA	T20
Matches	9	13	13
Runs scored	599	362	207
Batting average	37.43	36.20	18.81
100s/50s	1/5	0/3	0/1
Top score	112	96	57
Catches/stumpings	4/-	8/–	4/–
- Source: ESPNcricinfo, 20 December 2025

Shaqkere Delano Parris (born 15 July 2003) is a West Indian cricketer who plays for Trinbago Knight Riders in the Caribbean Premier League. He is a right handed batsman.

== Career ==
He was drafted into the Caribbean Premier League by Trinbago Knight Riders in July 2024. He subsequently made his debut in the Caribbean Premier League for Trinbago Knight Riders against Saint Kitts and Nevis Patriots on 31 August 2024. His performances during the tournament in which he opened the batting for Trinbago, included a hit six against the Guyana Amazon Warriors which travelled 124 metres. It was the longest of sixes registered in the competition, and was also reported to be amongst the top-ten longest sixes since records began. He made his first half century in the competition with a 20-ball 57 against St Lucia Kings.
