= Teddy Bishop (cricketer) =

West Indian cricketer

Personal information
- Full name: Teddy J Bishop
- Born: 26 January 2003 (age 23); Grenada
- Batting: Right-handed
- Role: Batter

International information
- National side: West Indies (2024)
- Only ODI (cap 222): 6 February 2024 v Australia
- ODI shirt no.: 50

Domestic team information
- Years: Team
- 2022–present: Windward Islands
- 2022: Barbados Royals
- 2024: Antigua and Barbuda Falcons
- 2025: Windward Islands Infernos

Career statistics
Competition	ODI	FC	LA	T20
Matches	1	23	33	2
Runs scored	0	1053	761	10
Batting average	0.00	27.00	26.24	5.00
100s/50s	0/0	1/8	0/4	0/0
Top score	0	114	95*	9
Balls bowled	0	70	0	0
Wickets	0	3	0	0
Bowling average	–	17.33	–	–
5 wickets in innings	0	0	0	0
10 wickets in match	–	0	–	–
Best bowling	–	2/35	–	–
Catches/stumpings	0/–	25/–	15/–	0/–
- Source: ESPNcricinfo, 31 December 2025

Teddy Bishop (born 26 January 2003) is a Grenadian cricketer. He made his List A debut for West Indies A on 16 August 2022.

He made his first-class debut for Windward Islands in the 2021–22 West Indies Championship on 11 February 2022 as a concussion substitute.

Prior to that he was named in the West Indies Under-19 team for the 2022 ICC Under-19 Cricket World Cup held in the West Indies in January and February 2022.
