= Rivaldo Clarke =

West Indian cricketer

Personal information
- Full name: Rivaldo Adrian Clarke
- Born: 29 December 2002 (age 22); Barbados
- Batting: Right-handed
- Bowling: Right-arm medium
- Role: Wicketkeeper batsman

Domestic team information
- Years: Team
- 2024–present: West Indies Academy
- 2022: Saint Lucia Kings
- 2023–Present: Barbados Royals
- Source: ESPNcricinfo, 7 December 2024

Rivaldo Adrian Clarke (born 29 December 2002) is a West Indian cricketer, who is a right-handed wicketkeeper batsman. He made his first-class debut and List A debut for the West Indies Academy in February 2024 and in October 2024 respectively. He made his Twenty20 debut for the Saint Lucia Kings in September 2022.
