= Jediah Blades =

West Indian cricketer (born 2002)

Personal information
- Born: 15 April 2002 (age 24); Barbados
- Batting: Right-handed
- Bowling: Left-arm Fast medium
- Role: Bowler

International information
- National side: West Indies (2024–present)
- ODI debut (cap 226): 12 December 2024 v Bangladesh
- Last ODI: 10 August 2025 v Pakistan
- T20I debut (cap 102): 25 July 2025 v Australia
- Last T20I: 30 September 2025 v Nepal

Domestic team information
- Years: Team
- 2024–present: Combined Campuses and Colleges
- 2024–present: West Indies Academy
- 2025: Guyana Amazon Warriors

Career statistics
Competition	ODI	T20I	FC	LA
Matches	3	6	15	19
Runs scored	0	5	157	20
Batting average	0.00	–	8.72	2.50
100s/50s	0/0	0/0	0/0	0/0
Top score	0	3*	24	10*
Balls bowled	120	119	2,323	822
Wickets	1	6	41	39
Bowling average	172.00	29.66	36.00	21.56
5 wickets in innings	0	0	0	1
10 wickets in match	–	–	0	0
Best bowling	1/46	3/29	4/37	5/28
Catches/stumpings	0/–	1/–	5/–	8/–
- Source: ESPNcricinfo, 26 July 2026

Jediah Blades (born 15 April 2002) is a Barbadian cricketer who plays for West Indies cricket team as a right-hand batter and left-arm fast medium bowler.

== Career ==
He made his List A debut for the Combined Campuses and Colleges against Windward Islands in the 2023–24 Super50 Cup on 22 October 2023. He made his first-class debut for the Combined Campuses and Colleges against Barbados in the 2023–24 West Indies Championship on 7 February 2024.

In December 2024, he was named in West Indies ODI squad against Bangladesh. He made his One Day International (ODI) debut on 12 December 2024, against Bangladesh in 3rd ODI of the same series.

In July 2025, Blade named in T20I squad against Australia. He made his Twenty20 International (T20I) debut in 3rd T20I of the following series on 25 July 2025.
