= Jyd Goolie =

Trinidadian cricketer (born 1997)

Personal information
- Full name: Jyd Uri Goolie
- Born: 11 May 1997 (age 29)
- Batting: Left-handed
- Bowling: Right-arm offbreak
- Role: Batter

Domestic team information
- Years: Team
- 2016-present: Trinidad and Tobago
- 2023: St Kitts & Nevis Patriots

Career statistics
Competition	FC	List A	T20
Matches	16	12	4
Runs scored	824	217	49
Batting average	34.33	54.25	12.25
100s/50s	3/3	0/2	0/0
Top score	128	68*	22
Balls bowled	197	201	–
Wickets	4	2	–
Bowling average	27.25	86.00	–
5 wickets in innings	0	–	–
10 wickets in match	0	–	–
Best bowling	2/6	1/2	–
Catches/stumpings	6/–	7/–	1/–
- Source: ESPNcricinfo, 10 October 2021

Jyd Goolie (born 11 May 1997) is a Trinidadian cricketer. He made his first-class debut for Trinidad and Tobago in the 2016–17 Regional Four Day Competition on 18 November 2016. Prior to his first-class debut, he was named in the West Indies squad for the 2016 Under-19 Cricket World Cup. In March 2020, in round eight of the 2019–20 West Indies Championship, Goolie scored his maiden century in first-class cricket.
