= Brian Lara Cricket Academy =

Multi-purpose stadium in Tarouba, Trinidad and Tobago

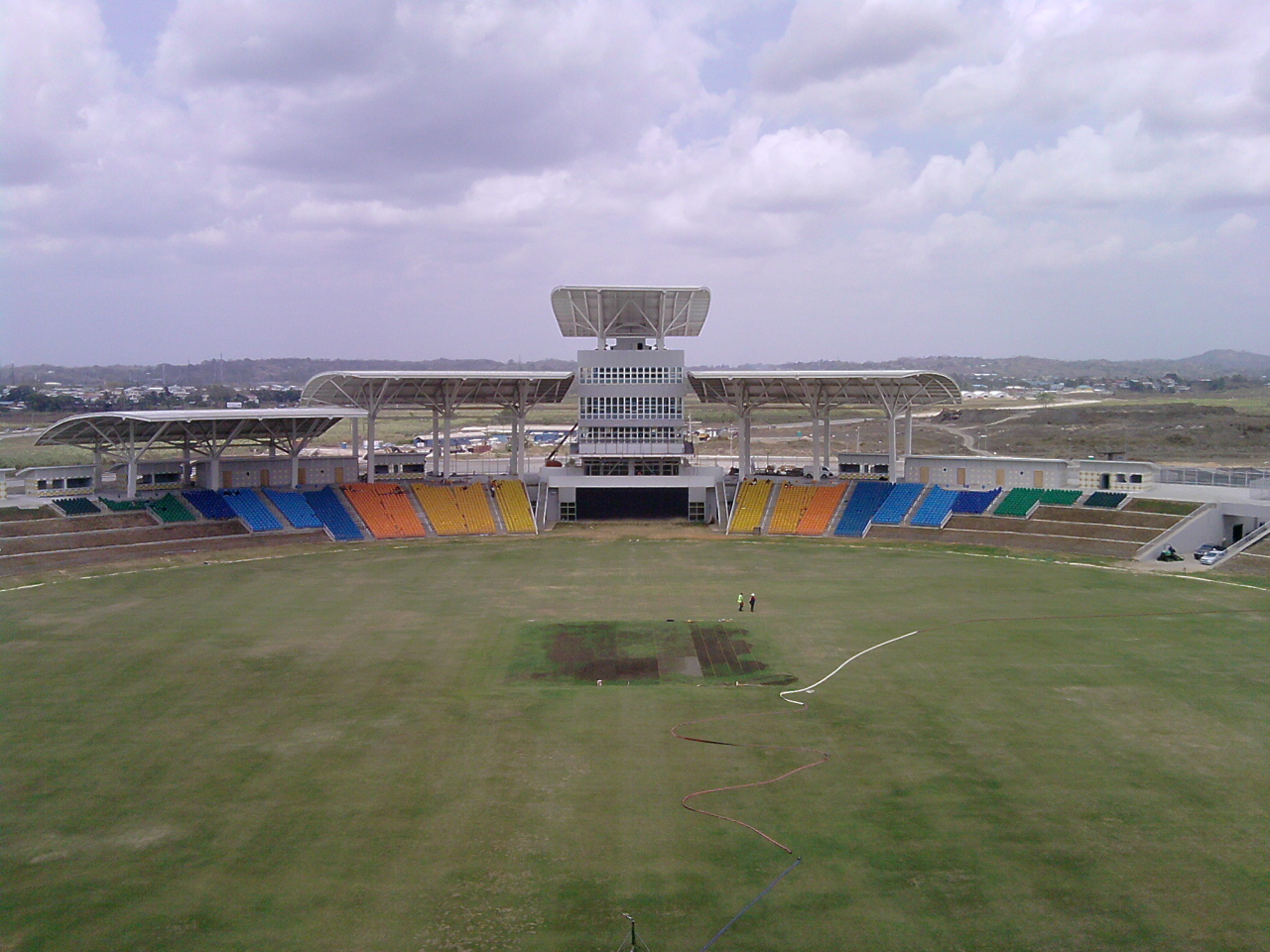
- Interactive map of Brian Lara Cricket Academy

Ground information
- Location: Tarouba, San Fernando, Trinidad and Tobago
- Country: West Indies
- Coordinates: 10°17′48″N 61°25′47″W
- Establishment: 2008, completed in 2017
- Capacity: 15,000
- Owner: Government of Trinidad and Tobago
- Operator: Government of Trinidad and Tobago
- Tenants: Trinbago Knight Riders; Trinidad and Tobago national cricket team
- End names
- North End; South End

International information
- First men's ODI: 1 August 2023: West Indies v India
- Last men's ODI: 12 August 2025: West Indies v Pakistan
- First men's T20I: 29 July 2022: West Indies v India
- Last men's T20I: 27 August 2024: West Indies v South Africa
- First women's ODI: 11 October 2017: West Indies v Sri Lanka
- Last women's ODI: 15 October 2017: West Indies v Sri Lanka
- First women's T20I: 28 September 2018: West Indies v South Africa
- Last women's T20I: 6 October 2018: West Indies v South Africa
- As of 27 August 2024; Source: Brian Lara Stadium, Cricinfo

The Brian Lara Cricket Academy is a multi-purpose stadium in Tarouba, San Fernando, Trinidad and Tobago, that was completed and inaugurated in 2017. It will be used mostly for cricket matches. It is located in southern Trinidad, just outside the heart of the city of San Fernando, beside the Sir Solomon Hochoy Highway, about two kilometres southeast of Trinidad and Tobago's former cricket ground at Guaracara Park, Pointe-a-Pierre.

Built to hold 15,000 people in a mix of fixed seating and grass banks it is named after former West Indies cricket captain Brian Lara, who until 17 October 2008 was the all-time leading run scorer in Test cricket, until he was surpassed by Sachin Tendulkar, the 2-time test match record holder with scores of 375 and 400 * both against England at the Antigua Recreation Ground in Antigua and Barbuda in 1994 and 2004 respectively and the first-class cricket record of 501 * which he scored against Durham County Cricket Club in 1994. It was initially planned to host warm-up matches during the 2007 Cricket World Cup and serve as a cricket academy after the tournament. However, when it became apparent that the facility would not be completed in time for the tournament, the warm-up matches were instead hosted at the Frank Worrell Field at UWI St Augustine.

The Caribbean Premier League chose the Brian Lara Cricket Academy as the host for the final matches of the 2017 tournament, the first high-profile matches at the ground. Subsequent to this the Government of Trinidad and Tobago further purchased the rights to hold the CPL finals from 2018 through to 2020 at the Brian Lara Cricket Academy.

== Development ==
The Brian Lara Cricket Academy was commissioned in 2004 by the Government of Trinidad and Tobago through the state company UDeCOTT to provide a high class sporting venue for the 2007 Cricket World Cup. With Trinidad and Tobago receiving the Brown Package of matches and the use of the Queens Park Oval as the primary venue, the Brian Lara facility was earmarked to host warm-up matches. To be ready for the Cricket World Cup the facility had to be completed by February 2007 and game ready by March 2007.

Major design and construction problems kept pushing back the completion date as well as increasing the construction cost. Once it became apparent it would not be ready for the World Cup, matches were shifted to the grounds at UWI. The delays and costs have made the complex one of the more controversial infrastructure projects undertaken in Trinidad and Tobago. The initial cost was estimated to be TT$257 million, but with the cost overruns and the increase in prices of materials, in 2009 the estimated costs were TT$700 million and by the time the facility was eventually opened in 2017 the costs had exceeded TT$1billion.

== Other sports ==
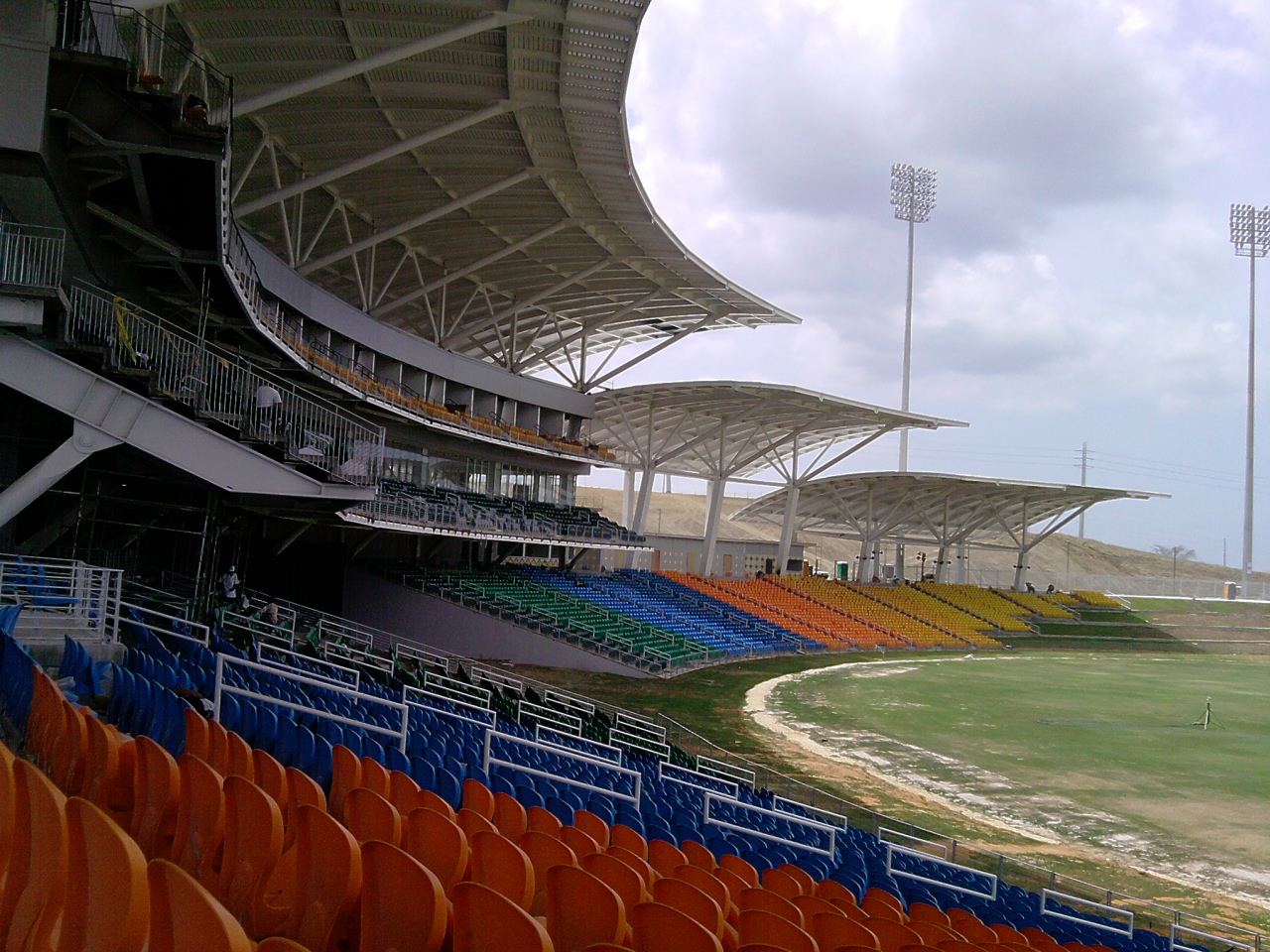
View across the stands in the Brian Lara Stadium

The Brian Lara Cricket Academy was meant to be a component of a larger complex situated on 180 acres (0.73 km^{2}) of farm land in Tarouba, with a cost of TT$1.1 billion. It was designed by Hellmuth, Obata + Kassabaum, a US architectural firm. The complex was proposed to consist of:

- An aquatic centre with Olympic standard pools. This project was eventually moved and completed in Couva at the Ato Boldon Stadium.
- Olympic-sized velodrome, which was also constructed near the Ato Boldon Stadium in Couva.
- Indoor gymnasium.
- School for training of athletes.
- A large car park, new roads and other infrastructure works.

The completed stadium serves as a training facility for cricketers. It has four indoor cricket training pitches with computerised biometric technology to measure an athlete’s performance, including two full-length run-up pitches for fast bowlers. Spectators have an unhindered view from every area of the stadium, including the concessionaires area. It also has areas specifically designed for the print, radio and television media.

The facility may also include a hotel in the future. It has been estimated to cost an additional TT$190 million.

== Cricket matches ==
The first major cricket matches at the ground were several of the matches of the Caribbean Premier League in September 2017, including the final. The first first-class match was held in November 2017: in 2017-18 and 2018–19 the Trinidad and Tobago team played some of its home matches in the Regional Four Day Competition there, and some at Queen's Park Oval in Port of Spain.

== 2024 ICC Men's T20 World Cup matches ==
12 June 2024
20:30 UTC−4 (N)
Scorecard

West Indies; 149/9 (20 overs)	v	New Zealand; 136/9 (20 overs)
Sherfane Rutherford 68* (39); Trent Boult 3/16 (4 overs)		Glenn Phillips 40 (33); Alzarri Joseph 4/19 (4 overs)

West Indies won by 13 runs
Brian Lara Cricket Academy, San Fernando
Umpires: Ahsan Raza (Pak) and Alex Wharf (Eng)
Player of the match: Sherfane Rutherford (WI)

- New Zealand won the toss and elected to field.
- West Indies qualified for the Super 8 as a result of this match.

13 June 2024
20:30 UTC−4 (N)
Scorecard

Papua New Guinea; 95 (19.5 overs)	v	Afghanistan; 101/3 (15.1 overs)
Kiplin Doriga 27 (32); Fazalhaq Farooqi 3/16 (4 overs)		Gulbadin Naib 49* (36); Semo Kamea 1/16 (3 overs)

Afghanistan won by 7 wickets
Brian Lara Cricket Academy, San Fernando
Umpires: Michael Gough (Eng) and Alex Wharf (Eng)
Player of the match: Fazalhaq Farooqi (Afg)

- Afghanistan won the toss and elected to field.
- Afghanistan qualified for the Super 8 while New Zealand, Uganda and Papua New Guinea were eliminated as a result of this match.

14 June 2024
20:30 UTC−4 (N)
Scorecard

Uganda; 40 (18.4 overs)	v	New Zealand; 41/1 (5.2 overs)
Kenneth Waiswa 11 (18); Tim Southee 3/4 (4 overs)		Devon Conway 22* (15); Riazat Ali Shah 1/10 (1 over)

New Zealand won by 9 wickets
Brian Lara Cricket Academy, San Fernando
Umpires: Richard Illingworth (Eng) and Paul Reiffel (Aus)
Player of the match: Tim Southee (NZ)

- New Zealand won the toss and elected to field.

17 June 2024
10:30 UTC−4
Scorecard

Papua New Guinea; 78 (19.4 overs)	v	New Zealand; 79/3 (12.2 overs)
Charles Amini 17 (25); Lockie Ferguson 3/0 (4 overs)		Devon Conway 35 (32); Kabua Morea 2/4 (2.2 overs)

New Zealand won by 7 wickets
Brian Lara Cricket Academy, San Fernando
Umpires: Paul Reiffel (Aus) and Langton Rusere (Zim)
Player of the match: Lockie Ferguson (NZ)

- New Zealand won the toss and elected to field.
- Trent Boult (NZ) played in his last T20I.
- Lockie Ferguson (NZ) became the second bowler to bowl four consecutive maiden overs in a T20I match.

=== Semi-final 1 ===
Semi-final 1
26 June 2024
20:30 UTC−4 (N)
Scorecard

Afghanistan; 56 (11.5 overs)	v	South Africa; 60/1 (8.5 overs)
Azmatullah Omarzai 10 (12); Tabraiz Shamsi 3/6 (1.5 overs)		Reeza Hendricks 29* (25); Fazalhaq Farooqi 1/11 (2 overs)

South Africa won by 9 wickets
Brian Lara Cricket Academy, San Fernando
Umpires: Richard Illingworth (Eng) and Nitin Menon (Ind)
Player of the match: Marco Jansen (SA)

- Afghanistan won the toss and elected to bat.
- This was the first time Afghanistan played in a major ICC tournament semi-final.
- Anrich Nortje (SA) took his 50th wicket in T20Is.
- Afghanistan posted their lowest T20I score.
- South Africa qualified for the T20 World Cup final for the first time.
