= Kofi James =

West Indian cricketer (born 1997)

Personal information
- Full name: Kofi Hardy Marli James
- Born: 23 December 1997 (age 28); Antigua
- Nickname: KJ
- Batting: Right-handed
- Bowling: Right-arm off-break
- Role: Batter

Domestic team information
- Years: Team
- 2017/18–present: Leeward Islands
- 2023: St Kitts & Nevis Patriots
- 2024: Antigua and Barbuda Falcons
- 2025: Barbados Royals

Career statistics
| Competition | FC | LA | T20 |
|---|---|---|---|
| Matches | 8 | 29 | 14 |
| Runs scored | 321 | 389 | 191 |
| Batting average | 22.92 | 18.52 | 17.36 |
| 100s/50s | 1/0 | 1/1 | 0/0 |
| Top score | 107 | 103 | 37 |
| Balls bowled | 502 | 1031 | 78 |
| Wickets | 6 | 29 | 2 |
| Bowling average | 44.66 | 29.13 | 60.00 |
| 5 wickets in innings | 0 | 0 | 0 |
| 10 wickets in match | 0 | – | – |
| Best bowling | 3/39 | 4/32 | 1/8 |
| Catches/stumpings | 6/– | 22/– | 11/– |
- Source: Cricinfo, 31 December 2025

Kofi James (born 23 December 1997) is an Antiguan cricketer. He made his List A debut for the Leeward Islands in the 2017–18 Regional Super50 on 12 February 2018. In October 2019, he was named in the Leeward Islands' squad for the 2019–20 Regional Super50 tournament. He made his first-class debut on 15 February 2022, for the Leeward Islands in the 2021–22 West Indies Championship.
