= Alick Athanaze =

Dominican cricketer (born 1998)

Personal information
- Born: 7 December 1998 (age 27); Marigot, Saint Andrew Parish, Dominica
- Batting: Left-handed
- Bowling: Right-arm off break
- Role: Middle-order batter

International information
- National side: West Indies (2023–present)
- Test debut (cap 333): 12 July 2023 v India
- Last Test: 25 January 2025 v Pakistan
- ODI debut (cap 219): 9 June 2023 v United Arab Emirates
- Last ODI: 12 December 2024 v Bangladesh
- T20I debut (cap 96): 26 May 2024 v South Africa
- Last T20I: 27 August 2024 v South Africa

Domestic team information
- Years: Team
- 2018–present: Windward Islands
- 2023–2024: Barbados Royals
- 2025: Windward Islands Infernos

Career statistics
Competition	Test	ODI	T20I	FC
Matches	15	15	6	57
Runs scored	725	361	137	3,204
Batting average	25.00	24.06	27.40	32.04
100s/50s	0/4	0/2	0/1	2/21
Top score	92	66	60	141
Balls bowled	156	84	–	739
Wickets	1	2	–	8
Bowling average	79.00	–	–	44.00
5 wickets in innings	0	–	–	0
10 wickets in match	0	–	–	0
Best bowling	1/53	–	–	3/37
Catches/stumpings	13/–	7/–	2/–	60/–
- Source: ESPNcricinfo, 22 October 2025

Alick Athanaze (born 7 December 1998) is a Dominican cricketer. He made his List A debut for the West Indies Under-19s in the 2016–17 Regional Super50 on 25 January 2017.

In November 2017, he was named in the West Indies squad for the 2018 Under-19 Cricket World Cup. Following the West Indies' matches in the tournament, the International Cricket Council (ICC) named Athanaze as the rising star of the squad. He became the second batsman for the West Indies to score two centuries in one tournament, and finished as the competition's leading run-scorer, with 418 runs.

In June 2018, he was named in the Cricket West Indies B Team squad for the inaugural edition of the Global T20 Canada tournament.

He made his first-class debut for the Windward Islands in the 2018–19 Regional Four Day Competition on 6 December 2018. In October 2019, he was named in the Windward Islands' squad for the 2019–20 Regional Super50 tournament. He was the leading run scorer in the 2022–23 West Indies Championship, scoring 647 runs in 10 innings.

== International career ==
In February 2023, Athanaze was selected in West Indies Test squad for the South Africa series.

In May 2023, he was named in West Indies' One Day International (ODI) squad for the series against United Arab Emirates. He made his ODI debut in the third ODI of the series, on 9 June 2023. Athanaze impressed, scoring 65 runs and equalling the record for fastest ODI half-century on debut. In December 2023, he scored 66 runs off 65 balls in the first match of the ODI series against England to lay a strong foundation for the West Indies, who successfully chased a target of 326 runs, winning the game by 4 wickets.

In December 2023, he was selected in West Indies squad for the test series during their tour of Australia. In the first test, he only managed to score 13 runs, all of which came in the first innings, as he scored a duck in the second innings. In January 2024, he was selected in West Indies's squad for the ODI series against Australia. He opened the batting for the West Indies in the first ODI and scored just 5 runs from 11 deliveries.

In December 2024, he was named in the West Indies test squad for the two match series against Pakistan.
