= Caribbean Premier League =

Professional twenty20 cricket league

- Countries: West Indies
- Administrator: Cricket West Indies
- Format: Twenty20
- First edition: 2013
- Latest edition: 2026
- Tournament format: Double round-robin and Playoffs
- Number of teams: 7
- Current champion: Antigua and Barbuda Falcons (1st title)
- Most successful: Trinbago Knight Riders (5 titles)
- Most runs: Johnson Charles (3315)
- Most wickets: Sunil Narine (133)
- TV: List of broadcasters
- Website: cplt20.com
- 2026

Seasons
- 2013 • 2014 • 2015 • 2016 • 2017 • 2018 • 2019 • 2020 • 2021 • 2022 • 2023 • 2024 • 2025 • 2026

The Caribbean Premier League (abbreviated to CPL or CPLT20) is an annual Twenty20 cricket tournament held in the Caribbean. It was founded by Cricket West Indies in 2013 to replace the Caribbean Twenty20 as the premier Twenty20 competition in the Caribbean. It is currently sponsored by Republic Bank Limited and consequently officially named the Republic Bank CPL. The inaugural tournament was won by the Jamaica Tallawahs who defeated the Guyana Amazon Warriors in the final.

== History ==
Twenty20 domestic cricket first appeared in an organised manner in the West Indies in 2006 with the privately organised Stanford 20/20. The second and last edition of the Stanford competition was officially made part of the West Indies Cricket Board (WICB) calendar in 2008, after which the tournament ended when its sponsor Allen Stanford was charged with fraud and arrested in June 2009. The next organised Twenty20 competition came about with the creation of the Caribbean Twenty20 tournament by the WICB. The Caribbean Twenty20 was created to fill the gap left by the end of the Stanford 20/20 and to coincide with the 2010 Champions League Twenty20 tournament, which started less than two months after. The top domestic team from the Caribbean Twenty20 tournament qualified for the Champions League as the sole representative of the West Indies.

The WICB first announced the plans for the Caribbean Premier League in September 2012 when it was revealed that the board was "in the advanced stages of discussions to have a commercial Twenty20 league in the region" with an unnamed investor and hoped to conclude a deal before 30 September. On 14 September, the board met to make decisions on the structure and organisation of the Caribbean Twenty20 CPL Schedule in January; to discuss the governance structure of the board and also discuss the planned commercial Twenty20 league and to finalise its structure. The Federation of International Cricketers' Associations (FICA) and the West Indies Players' Association (WIPA) were also to be brought in to discuss issues pertaining to players in relation to the planned T20 league. On 13 December 2012, the WICB announced that they had finalised an agreement with Ajmal Khan founder of Verus International, a Barbados-based merchant bank, for the funding of the new franchise-based Twenty20 league to be launched in 2013. It was then expected that the new Caribbean Premier League was likely to comprise six Caribbean city-based franchises as opposed to the current territorial set-up with the majority of the players are to come from the West Indies. As part of the agreement, the WICB will receive additional funding from Verus International for additional retainer contracts for players in addition to the 20 annual retainer contracts the board currently funds.

Dates for the tournament were confirmed for the 2013 Caribbean Premier League as 29 July to 26 August. The 2014 and 2015 tournaments took place between 5 July to 10 August and 21 June to 26 July respectively and the 2016 tournament took place between 29 June to 7 August.

== Format ==
=== CPL ===
The CPL T20 tournament is played between seven teams and is divided into a group stage and a playoff stage. In the group stage, the teams each play ten matches overall, including five home matches. But unlike other prominent T20 leagues which follow a proper home and away format stretching throughout the season, the CPL has an unusual format as the teams play all their home games consecutively within a week. The matches are played at 2 venues at once where the respective home teams play 5 matches each while the other teams play 2 matches, then the whole tournament moves to two other locations, and so on. Seven stadiums are used (see Venues below), each a home field for one of the teams. The playoff stage includes an eliminator, two qualifiers and a final to determine the winner of the tournament. All playoff games are played at a single venue.

=== The 6ixty ===
The 6ixty is a T10 league organized by Cricket West Indies and the Caribbean Premier League that is scheduled to be played four times a year, starting with a five-day men's and women's tournament in August 2022. A number of significant changes are made to the usual rules of T10 cricket:

- Teams are all out (i.e. they can't bat anymore) upon losing 6 wickets, rather than 10.
- The first 5 overs of each innings will all be bowled from one end of the pitch, with the other 5 overs bowled from the other end.
- Fielding teams must bowl the 10 overs of an innings within 45 minutes, or they lose a fielder during the final over.
- The batting team can 'unlock' a third powerplay over by hitting two sixes in the initial two powerplay overs.

== Teams ==
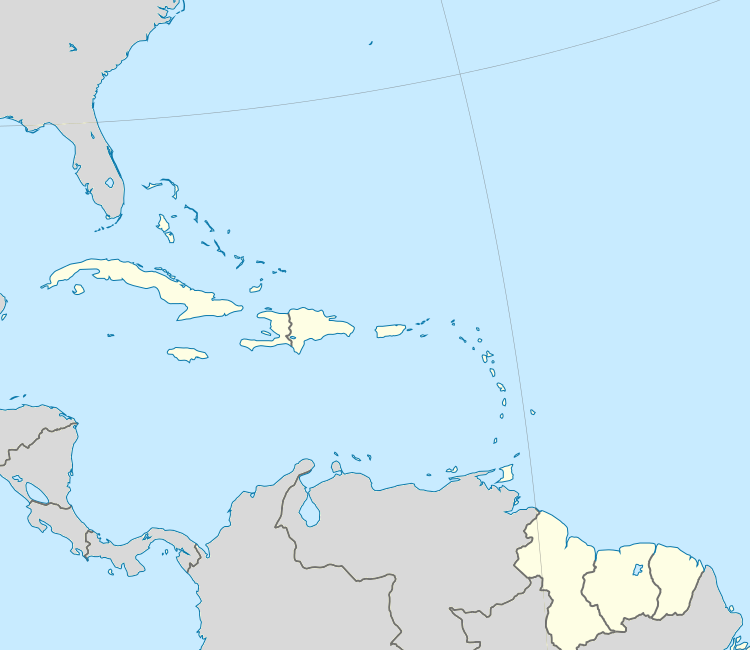
Location of CPL teams

The tournament includes seven franchises with fifteen contracted players each, including a maximum of five international players and four players under the age of 23. Each team has one local and one international franchise player.

Team	Home ground	Captain	Head coach
Antigua & Barbuda Falcons	Sir Vivian Richards Stadium, Saint George	Moeen Ali	Paul Nixon
Barbados Tridents	Kensington Oval, Bridgetown	Chris Green	Trevor Penney
Guyana Amazon Warriors	Providence Stadium, Providence	Imran Tahir	Lance Klusener
Jamaica Kingsmen	Sabina Park, Kingston, Jamaica	Rovman Powell	Grant Bradburn
St Kitts & Nevis Patriots	Warner Park Sporting Complex, Basseterre	Jason Holder	Simon Helmot
Saint Lucia Kings	Daren Sammy Cricket Ground, Gros Islet	Roston Chase	Daren Sammy
Trinbago Knight Riders	Queen's Park Oval, Port of Spain; Brian Lara Cricket Academy, San Fernando	Nicholas Pooran	Dwayne Bravo

=== Former teams ===
Team	Debut	Last	ref
Antigua Hawksbills	2013	2014	
Jamaica Tallawahs	2013	2023	

== Seasons ==
Six teams that have played in the Caribbean Premier League since its inception and was increased to seven teams in 2026. Trinbago Knight Riders are the most successful team in the history of Caribbean Premier League, with 5 titles. They are followed by Jamaica Tallawahs with 3 titles and Barbados Tridents with 2 titles. The current champions are Antigua & Barbuda Falcons who defeated Jamaica Kingsmen in 2026 to win their 1st CPL title.

CPL season's result
Season	Final				Player of the series
Season	Venue	Winners	Result	Runners-up	Player of the series
2013	Queen's Park Oval, Port of Spain, Trinidad and Tobago	Jamaica Tallawahs; 129/3 (17.3 overs)	Tallawahs won by 7 wickets Scorecard	Guyana Amazon Warriors; 128/5 (20 overs)	Krishmar Santokie (Guyana Amazon Warriors)
2014	Warner Park, Basseterre, St Kitts and Nevis	Barbados Tridents; 152/6 (20 overs)	Tridents won by 8 runs (D/L); Scorecard	Guyana Amazon Warriors; 107/4 (15.5 overs)	Lendl Simmons (Guyana Amazon Warriors)
2015	Queen's Park Oval, Port of Spain, Trinidad and Tobago	Trinidad & Tobago Red Steel; 178/5 (20 overs)	Red Steel won by 20 runs Scorecard	Barbados Tridents; 158/4 (20 overs)	Dwayne Bravo (Trinidad & Tobago Red Steel)
2016	Warner Park, Basseterre, St Kitts and Nevis	Jamaica Tallawahs; 95/1 (12.5 overs)	Tallawahs won by 9 wickets Scorecard	Guyana Amazon Warriors; 93 (20 overs)	Andre Russell (Jamaica Tallawahs)
2017	Brian Lara Cricket Academy, San Fernando, Trinidad and Tobago	Trinbago Knight Riders; 136/7 (19 overs)	Knight Riders won by 3 wickets Scorecard	St Kitts & Nevis Patriots; 135/6 (20 overs)	Chadwick Walton (Guyana Amazon Warriors)
2018	Brian Lara Cricket Academy, San Fernando, Trinidad and Tobago	Trinbago Knight Riders; 150/2 (17.3 overs)	Knight Riders won by 8 wickets Scorecard	Guyana Amazon Warriors; 147/9 (20 overs)	Colin Munro (Trinbago Knight Riders)
2019	Brian Lara Cricket Academy, San Fernando, Trinidad and Tobago	Barbados Tridents; 171/6 (20 overs)	Tridents won by 27 runs Scorecard	Guyana Amazon Warriors; 144/9 (20 overs)	Hayden Walsh Jr. (Barbados Tridents)
2020	Brian Lara Cricket Academy, San Fernando, Trinidad and Tobago	Trinbago Knight Riders; 157/2 (18.1 overs)	Knight Riders won by 8 wickets Scorecard	St Lucia Zouks; 154 (19.1 overs)	Kieron Pollard (Trinbago Knight Riders)
2021	Warner Park, Basseterre, St Kitts and Nevis	St Kitts & Nevis Patriots; 160/7 (20 overs)	Patriots won by 3 wickets Scorecard	Saint Lucia Kings; 159/7 (20 overs)	Roston Chase (Saint Lucia Kings)
2022	Providence Stadium, Providence, Guyana	Jamaica Tallawahs; 162/2 (16.1 overs)	Tallawahs won by 8 wickets Scorecard	Barbados Royals; 161/7 (20 overs)	Brandon King (Jamaica Tallawahs)
2023	Providence Stadium, Providence, Guyana	Guyana Amazon Warriors; 99/1 (14 overs)	Amazon Warriors won by 9 wickets Scorecard	Trinbago Knight Riders; 94 (18.1 overs)	Shai Hope (Guyana Amazon Warriors)
2024	Providence Stadium, Providence, Guyana	St Lucia Kings; 139/4 (18.1 overs)	Kings won by 6 wickets Scorecard	Guyana Amazon Warriors; 138/8 (20 overs)	Noor Ahmad (St Lucia Kings)
2025	Providence Stadium, Providence, Guyana	Trinbago Knight Riders; 133/7 (18 overs)	Knight Riders won by 3 wickets Scorecard	Guyana Amazon Warriors; 130/8 (20 overs)	Kieron Pollard (Trinbago Knight Riders)
2026	Kensington Oval, Bridgetown, Barbados	Antigua & Barbuda Falcons; 173/2 (16.4 overs)	Falcons won by 8 wickets Scorecard	Jamaica Kingsmen; 170/9 (20 overs)	Shadab Khan (Antigua & Barbuda Falcons)

== Number of titles ==
Team(s)	Title(s)	Runner-up	Seasons won	Seasons runner-up
Trinbago Knight Riders	5	1	2015, 2017, 2018, 2020, 2025	2023
Jamaica Tallawahs^{†}	3	–	2013, 2016, 2022	–
Barbados Tridents	2	2	2014, 2019	2015, 2022
Antigua & Barbuda Falcons	1	–	2026	–
Guyana Amazon Warriors	1	7	2023	2013, 2014, 2016, 2018, 2019, 2024, 2025
St Kitts & Nevis Patriots	1	1	2021	2017
Saint Lucia Kings	1	2	2024	2020, 2021

^{†} Team now defunct

== Teams' performances ==
Seasons Teams	2013	2014	2015	2016	2017	2018	2019	2020	2021	2022	2023	2024	2025	2026
Antigua Hawksbills	5th	6th	–											
Antigua & Barbuda Falcons	–											5th	4th	W
Barbados Tridents	3rd	W	RU	5th	5th	6th	W	5th	6th	RU	5th	3rd	6th	4th
Guyana Amazon Warriors	RU	RU	3rd	RU	3rd	RU	RU	3rd	4th	3rd	W	RU	RU	3rd
Jamaica Tallawahs	W	3rd	4th	W	4th	4th	6th	4th	5th	W	3rd	–		
Jamaica Kingsmen	–													RU
St Kitts & Nevis Patriots	–		6th	6th	RU	3rd	4th	6th	W	5th	6th	6th	5th	6th
Saint Lucia Kings	6th	5th	5th	4th	6th	5th	5th	RU	RU	4th	4th	W	3rd	5th
Trinbago Knight Riders	4th	4th	W	3rd	W	W	3rd	W	3rd	6th	RU	4th	W	7th

== Records and statistics ==
Caribbean Premier League records
Category	Statistic	Record holder	Value
Batting records	Most runs	Johnson Charles	3519
Batting records	Highest score	Brandon King	132* (72), vs Barbados Tridents
Bowling records	Most wickets	Sunil Narine	133
Bowling records	Best bowling	Shakib Al Hasan	6/6 (4 ov), vs Trinidad and Tobago Red Steel
Fielding	Most dismissals (wicket-keeper)	Nicholas Pooran	82
Fielding	Most catches (fielder)	Kieron Pollard	86
Team records	Highest total	Trinbago Knight Riders	267/2 (20 ov), vs Jamaica Tallawahs
Team records	Lowest total	Trinidad and Tobago Red Steel	52 (12.5 ov), vs. Barbados Tridents
Team records	Highest run chase	St Kitts & Nevis Patriots	242/6 (18.5 ov), vs Jamaica Tallawahs
Team records	Highest win margin (runs)	Trinbago Knight Riders	133 runs, vs Barbados Royals

== Sponsorships ==
Caribbean mobile network Digicel was named as the first global sponsor for the inaugural 2013 tournament and beyond in a multi-year deal. As previous sponsors of the West Indies cricket team and the Digicel Caribbean Cup the brand has considerable experience with sponsoring cricket and other sporting events throughout the Caribbean. "The CPL is a perfect fit for Digicel. We’re huge fans of West Indies cricket and this is a great opportunity for us to invest not only in what will be an amazing event, but also in the young cricketers who will benefit from around the region," stated Digicel Group Marketing Operations Director Kieran Foley.

Following the acquisition of the Guyana Amazon Warriors franchise owner, Dr. Ranjisingh 'Bobby' Ramroop's New GPC Inc, specifically its Limacol brand, has assumed the title sponsorship of the CPL.

In June 2013 Courts announced their sponsorship of the Caribbean Premier League "CPL's partnership with Courts is a very strategic and beneficial one to both parties, and we are thrilled about the possibilities that exist for us from a marketing perspective," said CPL CEO Damien O' Donohoe. "Combining our advertising and marketing programmes with that of Courts will heighten the awareness of CPL across the region, and increase fan support, which will put people in the stands at matches and customers in the aisles of Courts."

El Dorado Rum has been named as an official partner of the inaugural tournament, and sponsors the tournament's Catch of the Match award, which goes to one player in each game who makes a thrilling catch.

- In 2013 and 2014 season, Limacol was the title sponsor.
- Hero was title sponsor from 2015 to 2022.
- Republic Bank became the title sponsor in 2023 season.

== See also ==
- List of Caribbean Premier League cricket five-wicket hauls
- List of Caribbean Premier League records and statistics
- Women's Caribbean Premier League
