= Johann Layne =

West Indies cricketer

Personal information
- Born: 10 September 2003 (age 23); Barbados
- Batting: Right-handed
- Bowling: Right-arm Fast medium
- Role: Bowling Allrounder

International information
- National side: West Indies (2025–present)
- Test debut (cap 345): 2 October 2025 v India
- Last Test: 2 December 2025 v New Zealand

Domestic team information
- Years: Team
- 2022-present: West Indies Academy
- 2023-2024: St Kitts and Nevis Patriots
- 2025: Trinidad & Tobago Legions
- 2025-present: Barbados Royals

Career statistics
Competition	Test	FC	LA	T20
Matches	2	21	12	5
Runs scored	15	510	124	1
Batting average	5.00	17.58	17.71	1.00
100s/50s	0/0	0/0	0/0	0/0
Top score	14	63	29*	1
Balls bowled	234	2,750	486	54
Wickets	1	67	13	0
Bowling average	165.00	24.41	34.15	–
5 wickets in innings	0	4	0	0
10 wickets in match	0	0	–	–
Best bowling	1/47	6/30	3/55	–
Catches/stumpings	0/–	10/–	3/–	1/–
- Source: Cricinfo, 20 December 2025

Johann Layne (born 10 September 2003) is a West Indian cricketer.

== Career ==
In December 2021, he was named in the West Indies squad for the 2022 ICC Under-19 Cricket World Cup. He made his List A debut for West Indies Academy against Leeward Islands on 29 October 2022 during the 2022–23 Super50 Cup.

He made his first-class debut on 19 April 2023 playing for West Indies Academy against Team Headley during the 2023 Headley Weekes Tri-Series. He made his T20 debut playing for the St Kitts & Nevis Patriots in a league stage match against Guyana Amazon Warriors on 2 September 2023 during the 2023 Caribbean Premier League.

In November 2023, he was named in the West Indies Academy squad to face Emerging Ireland side in List A and first-class series.
