= Jewel Andrew =

Antiguan cricketer (born 2006)

Personal information
- Born: 7 December 2006 (age 19)
- Batting: Right-handed
- Role: Wicket-keeper-batter

International information
- National side: West Indies (2024–present)
- ODI debut (cap 223): 26 October 2024 v Sri Lanka
- Last ODI: 1 June 2025 v England
- T20I debut (cap 103): 31 July 2025 v Pakistan
- Last T20I: 29 September 2025 v Nepal

Domestic team information
- Years: Team
- 2023–present: Leeward Islands
- 2024–present: Antigua and Barbuda Falcons
- 2025: Guyana Amazon Warriors (Note: for 2025 Global Super League.)

Career statistics
Competition	ODI	T20I	FC	LA
Matches	5	7	19	18
Runs scored	8	99	958	406
Batting average	2.66	16.50	29.03	25.37
100s/50s	0/0	0/0	1/7	1/0
Top score	8	35	122	143
Balls bowled	0	0	4	3
Wickets	0	0	1	0
Bowling average	–	–	5.00	–
5 wickets in innings	0	0	0	0
10 wickets in match	–	–	0	–
Best bowling	–	–	1/5	–
Catches/stumpings	4/–	4/–	14/–	6/–
- Source: Cricinfo, 30 September 2026

Jewel Andrew (born 7 December 2006) is an Antiguan cricketer. He made his One Day International (ODI) debut for the West Indies cricket team against Sri Lanka in October 2024. He plays West Indian domestic cricket for the Leeward Islands cricket team and Antigua and Barbuda Falcons. He is a right-handed batsman and plays as a wicket-keeper.

== Domestic career ==
Andrew made his List A debut for Leeward Islands against Barbados in November 2023, aged 16.

== International career ==
=== Under-19 ===
In August 2023, Andrew was selected in the West Indies under-19 cricket team's squad for a tour of Sri Lanka. He was subsequently named in the West Indies squad for the 2024 Under-19 Cricket World Cup in South Africa. In the opening match of the World Cup, he scored 130 runs from 96 balls against South Africa.

=== Senior ===
Andrew made his One Day International debut for the West Indies against Sri Lanka at Pallekele in October 2024. He was 17 years old at the time of his debut, breaking Xavier Marshall's record as the youngest West Indies ODI debutant.

== Personal life ==
Andrew and his brother were raised by their mother Veronique Hill.
