= Shamar Joseph =

Guyanese cricketer (born 1999)

Personal information
- Born: 31 August 1999 (age 27); Baracara, Guyana
- Height: 172 cm (5 ft 8 in)
- Batting: Left-handed
- Bowling: Right-arm fast
- Role: Bowler

International information
- National side: West Indies (2024–present)
- Test debut (cap 337): 17 January 2024 v Australia
- Last Test: 12 July 2025 v Australia
- ODI debut (cap 224): 2 November 2024 v England
- Last ODI: 12 August 2025 v Pakistan
- ODI shirt no.: 70
- T20I debut (cap 95): 23 May 2024 v South Africa
- Last T20I: 3 August 2025 v Pakistan
- T20I shirt no.: 70

Domestic team information
- Years: Team
- 2023-present: Guyana
- 2023-present: Guyana Amazon Warriors
- 2024: Peshawar Zalmi
- 2024–2025: Lucknow Super Giants
- 2025: Durban's Super Giants

Career statistics
| Competition | Test | ODI | T20I | FC |
|---|---|---|---|---|
| Matches | 11 | 6 | 12 | 18 |
| Runs scored | 299 | 11 | 28 | 397 |
| Batting average | 15.73 | 11.00 | – | 12.80 |
| 100s/50s | 0/0 | 0/0 | 0/0 | 0/0 |
| Top score | 44 | 8 | 21* | 44 |
| Balls bowled | 1,740 | 251 | 240 | 2,910 |
| Wickets | 51 | 4 | 15 | 80 |
| Bowling average | 21.66 | 67.50 | 25.33 | 22.80 |
| 5 wickets in innings | 4 | 0 | 0 | 5 |
| 10 wickets in match | 0 | – | – | 0 |
| Best bowling | 7/68 | 2/65 | 3/30 | 7/68 |
| Catches/stumpings | 1/– | 1/– | 4/– | 6/– |
- Source: ESPNcricinfo, 4 January 2026

Shamar Joseph (born 31 August 1999) is a Guyanese cricketer who plays for Guyana in first-class cricket and for the West Indies in international cricket. He is a right-arm fast bowler. He made his international debut for the West Indies in January 2024 against Australia at the Adelaide Oval. Prior to his professional cricket career, he worked as a security guard.

== Biography ==
Joseph is from Baracara, a small community in East Berbice-Corentyne, Guyana, about 225 km up the Canje River and two days by boat from the port city of New Amsterdam. He grew up with little to no access to internet facilities or telephone connections.

Joseph grew up in a family of three sisters and five brothers. He idolised Curtly Ambrose and Courtney Walsh, opening bowlers for the West Indies cricket team, watching their highlights and imitating them in his tape ball games around the village. He started bowling with fruits such as lemons, limes, guavas and peaches along with a tape ball, in what was dubbed "jungle-land cricket" in the region. He also practiced using balls made of melted plastic bottles.

He experienced his first taste of cricket playing for Tucber Park Cricket Club in a few first-division and second-division matches. He became the first test cricketer from Baracara.

== Early career ==
Prior to his cricket career, Joseph worked with his siblings and father in the logging industry, felling and chopping logs in Baracara and transporting the timber down the Canje River to New Amsterdam. Following an incident in which a falling tree nearly hit him, Joseph decided to move away from Baracara, and relocated to New Amsterdam seeking work to support his family.

In New Amsterdam, Joseph found employment first in construction, working as a labourer, and then as a security guard at the Amalgamated Security Services in Scotiabank, New Amsterdam. His job as a security guard required him to work long, 12-hour shifts, across day and night, leaving little scope for cricketing endeavours. Eventually, with the support of his fiancée, Joseph decided to quit his job and pursue his cricketing ambitions full time.

== Domestic career ==
It was through Romario Shepherd that Joseph got his first break in cricket. Shepherd introduced Joseph to the Guyana cricket team where Joseph connected with Esuan Crandon, the Guyana head coach, and with other senior Guyanese players including then Guyana team captain Leon Johnson. He also received support from former Guyanese cricketer turned businessman Damion Vantull who assured Joseph to try his luck in cricket by forgoing the security guard job. Joseph immediately made a great impression, recording debut figures of 6/13 in Division 1 cricket. He also attended a fast bowling clinic in Berbice run by Curtly Ambrose. He also stamped his authority further when he took eight wickets in a trial game and it eventually prompted him to gain a call-up to first-class cricket. Joseph also played club cricket for the Muslim Youth Organisation (MYO) Sports Club in Georgetown.

Joseph was named as one of four uncapped players by the Guyana Harpy Eagles for the 55th edition of the Regional Four Day Competition and never played or represented Guyana at any level prior to his call-up for the first-class cricket tournament. He made his first-class debut for Guyana against Barbados on 1 February 2023 during the 2022–23 West Indies Championship. He took his first career five-wicket haul in first-class cricket against Windward Islands during the 2022–23 West Indies Championship and ended with figures of 5/41 in a spell bowling 12 overs.

He was initially brought in as a net bowler by the Guyana Amazon Warriors for the 2023 Caribbean Premier League and made the 2023 squad as an injury replacement for Keemo Paul. During his maiden CPL stint, he met Prasanna Agoram, the talent scout for Guyana Amazon Warriors, who encouraged Joseph to take his cricket career seriously. Joseph has ever since shown his admiration towards Prasanna Agoram and Joseph called Agoram fondly as his "father and mother". It was Agoram who convinced then Guyana Amazon Warriors captain Imran Tahir to include Joseph in the Guyana Amazon Warriors squad for the 2023 CPL season.

Joseph made his T20 debut in a league stage match against Barbados Royals on 17 September 2023. Joseph was also one of the key members of the Guyana Amazon Warriors side, which emerged as 2023 champions in the Caribbean Premier League (CPL). Although he only played 2 matches in his 2023 maiden CPL Guyana Amazon Warriors stint, Joseph was remarkable in his ability to deliver short-pitched deliveries at speeds exceeding 140 kph consistently.

Joseph made his List A debut playing for Guyana against Barbados on 29 October 2023 during the 2023–24 Super50 Cup. He was included in Guyana's squad as an 11th hour injury replacement for Ronsford Beaton for the 2023-24 CG Insurance Super50 Cup. In November 2023, he was named in the West Indies A side for their tour of South Africa to play against the South African A side in a three-match first-class series. He was impressive during the first-class series against the South African A side where he was the joint wicket-taker for the West Indies A side alongside Kevin Sinclair with 12 scalps. In January 2024, Joseph was picked by Peshawar Zalmi during the 2024 Pakistan Super League players draft as a partial replacement for Gus Atkinson.

In February 2024, he was picked by Lucknow Super Giants for INR 3 crores as a replacement for Mark Wood ahead of the 2024 Indian Premier League. Shamar Joseph made his IPL debut against Kolkata Knight Riders at the Eden Gardens in Kolkata and further went on to bowl one of the longest over (10 balls) in IPL history and he went onto concede 22 runs in his opening over.

== International career ==
In December 2023, Joseph was named as one of the seven uncapped players in the West Indies test squad for the tour of Australia as part of the 2023–2025 ICC World Test Championship. He made his test debut at the Adelaide Oval on 17 January 2024 in the first test of the two-match series against Australia. The first two spells he bowled at the Karen Rolton Oval against the Cricket Australia XI side earned him a place in the first test match of the series against Australia as his bowling spells impressed the West Indies selectors.

He came in at number 11 on his test debut during the first innings of the West Indies and scored 36 runs off 41 deliveries. He also put on a last wicket partnership of 55 runs with Kemar Roach to support the West Indies to a total of 188. He registered the highest individual score by a West Indian number 11 batsman on test debut.

Joseph also took a wicket off the first delivery he bowled in his test career when he dismissed Australian opener Steve Smith for 12 runs. He also became only the second West Indies bowler to have taken a wicket off the first delivery bowled in test cricket after Tyrell Johnson when he drew Smith to edge it to Justin Greaves. He also dismissed Marnus Labuschagne. On 18 January 2024, he took his first five-wicket haul in test cricket by doing so on his test debut and became the tenth cricketer from the West Indies to take a five-wicket haul on test debut. He also became the second bowler in test cricket history after Nathan Lyon to complete the double of having taken a wicket off the first ball in test career and for having taken five wickets on test debut in maiden innings. He also became the first West Indies player to achieve the unique distinction of having scored over 50 runs and to have taken a five-wicket haul on his test debut. Although, West Indies lost the first match by ten wickets, Joseph became a fan favorite for his performances.

On 28 January 2024, he picked up eight wickets in his second test match against Australia, and his second-innings spell of 7/68 in 11.5 overs helped the West Indies clinch a thrilling test win by a margin of eight runs. He spearheaded the bowling performance for the West Indies, registering their first test win in Australia for 27 years. He had earlier injured his toe while batting, when hit by a delivery off the bowling of Mitchell Starc during the second innings of West Indies side. Joseph took the final wicket of the match by dismissing Hazlewood to complete a historic test victory and it sparked some joy to commentators including the likes of Ian Bishop who was quoted saying "A real dream come true for 'Joseph the Deliverer', for the West Indies." Joseph also received player of the series award for his bowling performances throughout the series as he picked up 13 wickets. He became the first West Indies player to receive player of the series award in his debut test series and eleventh overall to achieve such feat.

In February 2024, Cricket West Indies officially confirmed an international retainer contract to Shamar Joseph following his performances against Australia in the test series. He was awarded the ICC Men's Player of the Month award for the month of January 2024. He also became the first ever West Indies player to win the ICC Men's Player of the Month award.

In May 2024, he was included in the West Indies' squad for the 2024 ICC Men's T20 World Cup as an uncapped player.

== See also ==
- List of West Indies cricketers who have taken five-wicket hauls on Test debut
