= Gudakesh Motie =

Guyanese cricketer (born 29 March 1995)

Personal information
- Born: 29 March 1995 (age 31); Georgetown, Guyana
- Batting: Left-handed
- Bowling: Slow left-arm orthodox
- Role: Bowling all-rounder

International information
- National side: West Indies (2021-present)
- Test debut (cap 328): 16 June 2022 v Bangladesh
- Last Test: 25 January 2025 v Pakistan
- ODI debut (cap 213): 10 July 2022 v Bangladesh
- Last ODI: 3 June 2026 v Sri Lanka
- T20I debut (cap 90): 16 December 2021 v Pakistan
- Last T20I: 19 February 2026 v Italy

Domestic team information
- Years: Team
- 2015–present: Guyana
- 2021–2025: Guyana Amazon Warriors (squad no. 68)

Career statistics
Competition	Test	ODI	T20I	FC
Matches	11	34	40	55
Runs scored	265	357	166	1,197
Batting average	22.08	22.31	12.76	23.47
100s/50s	0/1	0/2	0/0	1/4
Top score	55	63	33	110
Balls bowled	1,740	1,669	744	9,291
Wickets	35	42	33	188
Bowling average	27.02	31.47	27.44	21.82
5 wickets in innings	2	0	0	7
10 wickets in match	1	–	–	2
Best bowling	7/37	4/23	3/22	7/37
Catches/stumpings	5/–	18/–	12/–	40/–
- Source: Cricinfo, 31 October 2025

Gudakesh Motie (born 29 March 1995) is a Guyanese cricketer who plays for Guyana in West Indian domestic cricket. He is a left-arm orthodox bowler and a lower-order batsman. He made his international debut for the West Indies cricket team in December 2021.

== Career ==
Motie played for the West Indies under-19s at the 2014 Under-19 World Cup in the United Arab Emirates. He made his first-class debut for Guyana in November 2015, playing against the Windward Islands in the 2015–16 Regional Four Day Competition. In just his second game, against the Leeward Islands, Motie took 6/20 and 5/85 (match figures of 11/105), and was named man of the match. He also took 6/79 in the following match against Barbados, and added a fourth five-wicket haul for the season two games later, taking 6/33 against Jamaica.

In October 2019, he was named in Guyana's squad for the 2019–20 Regional Super50 tournament. He was the leading wicket taker in the super50 series of 2021, with a total of 16 wickets. He made his Twenty20 debut on 2 September 2021, for the Guyana Amazon Warriors in the 2021 Caribbean Premier League.

In November 2021, Motie was named in the West Indies' One Day International (ODI) and Twenty20 International (T20I) squads for their series against Pakistan. He made his T20I debut on 16 December 2021, for the West Indies against Pakistan. In December 2021, he was named in the West Indies' ODI squad for their series against Ireland.

In May 2022, in the third round of the 2021–22 West Indies Championship, Motie scored his maiden century in first-class cricket, with 110 runs against Barbados. The following month, he was named in the West Indies' Test squad for their series against Bangladesh. He made his Test debut on 16 June 2022, for the West Indies against Bangladesh. Later the same month, Motie was named in the West Indies' ODI squad, also for their series against Bangladesh. He made his ODI debut on 10 July 2022, for the West Indies against Bangladesh.

In December 2023, he was named in West Indies squad for Test series against Australia.

In May 2024, he was named in the West Indies squad for the 2024 ICC Men's T20 World Cup tournament.
