= Sherfane Rutherford =

West Indian cricketer

Personal information
- Full name: Sherfane Eviston Rutherford
- Born: 15 August 1998 (age 28); Enmore, Guyana
- Batting: Left-handed
- Bowling: Right-arm Fast medium
- Role: Middle-order batter

International information
- National side: West Indies (2018–present)
- ODI debut (cap 220): 3 December 2023 v England
- Last ODI: 22 November 2025 v New Zealand
- T20I debut (cap 78): 22 December 2018 v Bangladesh
- Last T20I: 1 March 2026 v India

Domestic team information
- Years: Team
- 2016/17–present (Note: Only clubs that Rutherford has played for more than one season are included in this list): Guyana
- 2018–2020: Guyana Amazon Warriors
- 2021–2022: Peshawar Zalmi
- 2021–2024: St Kitts and Nevis Patriots
- 2023–2025: Desert Vipers
- 2025–2026: Barbados Tridents

Career statistics
Competition	ODI	T20I	LA	T20
Matches	31	56	66	278
Runs scored	873	902	1,723	4,869
Batting average	36.37	24.37	34.46	25.09
100s/50s	1/8	0/6	2/12	0/22
Top score	113	76*	113	86
Balls bowled	125	54	776	348
Wickets	3	2	16	18
Bowling average	58.33	46.00	47.81	31.11
5 wickets in innings	0	0	0	0
10 wickets in match	0	0	0	0
Best bowling	1/24	1/20	3/25	4/24
Catches/stumpings	11/–	18/–	21/–	89/–
- Source: Cricinfo, 4 October 2026

Sherfane Eviston Rutherford (born 15 August 1998) is a Guyanese cricketer. He made his Twenty20 International debut for the West Indies against Bangladesh on 22 December 2018 and his One Day International debut in December 2023 against England.

== Domestic and T20 career ==
Rutherford made his first-class debut for Guyana in the 2016–17 Regional Four-Day Competition on 15 April 2017. He made his List A debut for Guyana in the 2017–18 Regional Super50 on 31 January 2018.

In June 2018, Rutherford was named in the Cricket West Indies B Team squad for the inaugural edition of the Global T20 Canada tournament. He was the leading run-scorer in the tournament for the Cricket West Indies B Team, with 230 runs in eight matches.

Rutherford made his Twenty20 debut for Guyana Amazon Warriors in the 2018 Caribbean Premier League on 9 August 2018.

In October 2018, Rutherford was named in the squad for the Khulna Titans team, following the draft for the 2018–19 Bangladesh Premier League.

In June 2019, Rutherford was selected to play for the Edmonton Royals franchise team in the 2019 Global T20 Canada tournament. In November 2019, he was selected to play for the Sylhet Thunder in the 2019–20 Bangladesh Premier League. In July 2020, he was named in the Guyana Amazon Warriors squad for the 2020 Caribbean Premier League.

In July 2022, he was signed by the Galle Gladiators for the third edition of the Lanka Premier League.

=== Indian Premier League ===
In December 2018, he was bought by the Delhi Capitals in the player auction for the 2019 Indian Premier League. On 11 September 2021, Rutherford was included in the Sunrisers Hyderabad squad for the second phase of the 2021 IPL as a replacement player for Jonny Bairstow. In February 2022, he was bought by the Royal Challengers Bangalore in the auction for the 2022 Indian Premier League tournament. In 2025, he joined Gujarat Titans as a middle order power-hitter in the IPL. In IPL 2026, Rutherford joined Mumbai Indians, after he was traded to them from Gujarat Titans on 13 November 2025.

== International career ==
In October 2018, Rutherford was named in the West Indies' Twenty20 International (T20I) squad for series against India, but he did not play. In December 2018, he was again named in the West Indies' T20I squad, this time for their series against Bangladesh. He made his T20I debut for the West Indies against Bangladesh on 22 December 2018. In December 2023, he was selected in West Indies squad for the T20 series against England. On 3 December 2023, Rutherford debuted in ODI for the West Indies.

In May 2024, he was named in the West Indies squad for the 2024 ICC Men's T20 World Cup tournament. On 8 December 2024, Rutherford scored his maiden One Day International (ODI) century with an innings of 113 for the West Indies as they beat Bangladesh by five wickets, the score included seven fours and eight sixes.

On 8 December 2024, Rutherford scored his maiden ODI century scoring 113 runs off 80 balls against Bangladesh.

In October 2026, Rutherford scored unbeaten 49 runs off 26 balls in T20 against India.
