= 2024 Global Super League =

Inaugural season of the Global Super League

- Dates: 26 November – 6 December 2024
- Administrator: Cricket West Indies
- Cricket format: Twenty20
- Tournament format(s): Round-robin and final
- Host: Guyana
- Champions: Rangpur Riders (1st title)
- Runners-up: Victoria
- Participants: 5
- Matches: 11
- Player of the series: Soumya Sarkar (Rangpur Riders)
- Most valuable player: Liam Dawson (Hampshire)
- Most runs: Soumya Sarkar (Rangpur Riders) (188)
- Most wickets: Callum Stow (Victoria) (9)
- Official website: gslt20.com

The 2024 Global Super League was the inaugural edition of the Global Super League. The tournament featured five teams from different countries that played 11 matches from 26 November to 6 December 2024. All matches were played at Providence Stadium in Providence, Guyana.

In the final, Rangpur Riders defeated Cricket Victoria by 56 runs to win the title.

== Background and format ==
The Global Super League is an invitational cricket tournament, organised by Cricket West Indies.

Five teams played against each other in a round-robin stage with the top two teams advancing to the final. The total prize money for the competition was US$1 million.

== Teams ==
Five teams took part in the tournament.

Team	Domestic league	Head coach	Captain
Guyana Amazon Warriors	Caribbean Premier League	Prasanna Agoram	Imran Tahir
Hampshire	Vitality Blast	Adrian Birrell	Chris Wood
Lahore Qalandars	Pakistan Super League	Darren Gough	Carlos Brathwaite
Rangpur Riders	Bangladesh Premier League	Mickey Arthur	Nurul Hasan
Victoria	Sheffield Shield	Chris Rogers	Corey Anderson

== Squads ==
Guyana Amazon Warriors	Hampshire	Lahore Qalandars	Rangpur Riders	Victoria
Imran Tahir (c); Moeen Ali; Kevlon Anderson; Roston Chase; Mark Deyal; Shimron Hetmyer; Shai Hope (wk); Hassan Khan; Gudakesh Motie; Keemo Paul; Dwaine Pretorius; Tanzim Hasan Sakib; Romario Shepherd; Junior Sinclair; Shamar Springer	Chris Wood (c); Toby Albert; Sonny Baker; Danny Briggs; Liam Dawson; James Fuller; Benny Howell; Shayan Jahangir; Shan Masood; Fletcha Middleton; Felix Organ; Ali Orr (wk); Tom Prest; Joe Weatherley; Brad Wheal	Carlos Brathwaite (c); Tayyab Abbas; Tom Abell; Muhammad Akhlaq (wk); Faheem Ashraf; Mirza Tahir Baig; Muhammad Faizan; Syed Faridoun; Zaman Khan; Yasir Mohammad; Adam Rossington (wk); Kaleem Sana; Tabraiz Shamsi; Luke Wells; Mohammad Zeeshan	Nurul Hasan (c, wk); Zak Chappell; Matthew Forde; Mahedi Hasan; Saif Hassan; Afif Hossain; Rishad Hossain; Wayne Madsen; Kamrul Islam Rabbi; Mohammad Saifuddin; Soumya Sarkar; Khushdil Shah; Harmeet Singh; Arafat Sunny; Steven Taylor (wk)	Corey Anderson (c); Max Birthisel; Farzan Chowna; Joe Clarke (wk); Dominic Drakes; Juanoy Drysdale; Scott Edwards (wk); Karima Gore; Jahmar Hamilton; Sanjay Krishnamurthi; Carmi le Roux; Blake Macdonald; David Moody; Jackson Smith; Callum Stow; Jonathan Wells

== Points table ==
Pos	Team	Pld	W	L	NR	Pts	NRR	Qualification
1	Victoria (RU)	4	3	1	0	6	1.052	Advanced to the final
2	Rangpur Riders (C)	4	2	2	0	4	0.410	Advanced to the final
3	Guyana Amazon Warriors	4	2	2	0	4	0.107	
4	Lahore Qalandars	4	2	2	0	4	−0.420	
5	Hampshire Hawks	4	1	3	0	2	−1.155	

Source: ESPNcricinfo, Cricbuzz
- (C): Champions
- (RU): Runners-up

=== Match summary ===
Team	Group matches				Play-offs
Team	1	2	3	4	Final
Guyana Amazon Warriors	2	2	4	4	—
Hampshire Hawks	2	2	2	2	—
Lahore Qalandars	0	2	4	4	—
Rangpur Riders	0	0	2	4	W
Victoria	2	4	4	6	L

Win	Loss	Tie	No result	Eliminated

- Note: The total points at the end of each group match are listed.
- Note: Click on the points or results to see the match summary.

== Fixtures ==
Match 1
26 November 2024
19:00 (N)
Scorecard

Lahore Qalandars; 125 (19.2 overs)	v	Guyana Amazon Warriors; 129/4 (17.5 overs)
Tom Abell 48 (45); Dwaine Pretorius 4/21 (4 overs)		Shai Hope 45* (43); Asif Afridi 2/13 (3 overs)

Guyana Amazon Warriors won by 6 wickets
Providence Stadium, Providence
Umpires: Nigel Duguid (WI) and Patrick Gustard (WI)
Player of the match: Dwaine Pretorius (Guyana Amazon Warriors)

- Guyana Amazon Warriors won the toss and elected to field.

Match 2
27 November 2024
19:00 (N)
Scorecard

Hampshire; 132 (20 overs)	v	Rangpur Riders; 132/8 (20 overs)
Shan Masood 56 (41); Zak Chappell 5/23 (4 overs)		Soumya Sarkar 27 (20); James Fuller 2/17 (3 overs)

Match tied (Hampshire won the Super Over)
Providence Stadium, Providence
Umpires: Christopher Taylor (WI) and Carl Tuckett (WI)
Player of the match: Shan Masood (Hampshire)

- Hampshire won the toss and elected to bat.
- Zak Chappell (Rangpur Riders) took his first five-wicket haul in T20s.
- Super Over: Rangpur Riders 12/1, Hampshire 14/1

Match 3
29 November 2024
19:00 (N)
Scorecard

Guyana Amazon Warriors; 162/6 (20 overs)	v	Victoria; 166/6 (19.2 overs)
Moeen Ali 51 (33); Jackson Smith 2/38 (4 overs)		Karima Gore 36* (24); Imran Tahir 2/34 (4 overs)

Victoria won by 4 wickets
Providence Stadium, Providence
Umpires: Patrick Gustard (WI) and Christopher Taylor (WI)
Player of the match: Karima Gore (Victoria)

- Victoria won the toss and elected to field.
- Max Birthisel, Blake Macdonald, Jackson Smith and Callum Stow (Victoria) all made their T20 debuts.

Match 4
30 November 2024
10:00
Scorecard

Lahore Qalandars; 135/5 (20 overs)	v	Hampshire; 131/8 (20 overs)
Luke Wells 35* (24); Liam Dawson 2/19 (4 overs)		Tom Prest 30 (22); Tabraiz Shamsi 3/21 (4 overs)

Lahore Qalandars won by 4 runs
Providence Stadium, Providence
Umpires: Nigel Duguid (WI) and Carl Tuckett (WI)
Player of the match: Luke Wells (Lahore Qalandars)

- Lahore Qalandars won the toss and elected to bat.

Match 5
1 December 2024
10:00
Scorecard

Victoria; 151/6 (20 overs)	v	Rangpur Riders; 141/7 (20 overs)
Blake Macdonald 40 (29); Rishad Hossain 2/23 (4 overs)		Soumya Sarkar 51 (42); Callum Stow 3/15 (4 overs)

Victoria won by 10 runs
Providence Stadium, Providence
Umpires: Patrick Gustard (WI) and Carl Tuckett (WI)
Player of the match: Callum Stow (Victoria)

- Rangpur Riders won the toss and elected to field.

Match 6
1 December 2024
19:00 (N)
Scorecard

Hampshire; 146/6 (20 overs)	v	Guyana Amazon Warriors; 147/6 (18.2 overs)
Shan Masood 79 (54); Imran Tahir 3/18 (4 overs)		Roston Chase 33 (26); Benny Howell 2/20 (3.2 overs)

Guyana Amazon Warriors won by 4 wickets
Providence Stadium, Providence
Umpires: Nigel Duguid (WI) and Christopher Taylor (WI)
Player of the match: Imran Tahir (Guyana Amazon Warriors)

- Guyana Amazon Warriors won the toss and elected to field.

Match 7
3 December 2024
19:00 (N)
Scorecard

Lahore Qalandars; 139 (19.5 overs)	v	Victoria; 129 (19.3 overs)
Mirza Tahir Baig 39 (36); Dominic Drakes 3/18 (4 overs)		Blake Macdonald 33 (25); Tabraiz Shamsi 3/11 (4 overs)

Lahore Qalandars won by 10 runs
Providence Stadium, Providence
Umpires: Patrick Gustard (WI) and Carl Tuckett (WI)
Player of the match: Tabraiz Shamsi (Lahore Qalandars)

- Victoria won the toss and elected to field.

Match 8
4 December 2024
19:00 (N)
Scorecard

Rangpur Riders; 117 (20 overs)	v	Guyana Amazon Warriors; 102 (19.1 overs)
Khushdil Shah 58 (47); Dwaine Pretorius 3/15 (4 overs)		Shai Hope 35 (44); Kamrul Islam 4/13 (3.1 overs)

Rangpur Riders won by 15 runs
Providence Stadium, Providence
Umpires: Nigel Duguid (WI) and Christopher Taylor (WI)
Player of the match: Khushdil Shah (Rangpur Riders)

- Rangpur Riders won the toss and elected to bat.

Match 9
5 December 2024
10:00
Scorecard

Victoria; 170/4 (20 overs)	v	Hampshire; 95 (12.1 overs)
Sanjay Krishnamurthi 77 (49); Sonny Baker 2/29 (4 overs)		Joe Weatherley 18 (14); Callum Stow 4/17 (3.1 overs)

Victoria won by 75 runs
Providence Stadium, Providence
Umpires: Nigel Duguid (WI) and Christopher Taylor (WI)
Player of the match: Sanjay Krishnamurthi (Victoria)

- Hampshire won the toss and elected to field.

Match 10
5 December 2024
19:00 (N)
Scorecard

Rangpur Riders; 85/1 (9 overs)	v	Lahore Qalandars; 87/7 (9 overs)
Steven Taylor 32* (27); Mirza Tahir Baig 1/12 (1 over)		Mirza Tahir Baig 31 (20); Mahedi Hasan 3/11 (2 overs)

Rangpur Riders won by 23 runs (DLS method)
Providence Stadium, Providence
Umpires: Patrick Gustard (WI) and Carl Tuckett (WI)
Player of the match: Steven Taylor (Rangpur Riders)

- Rangpur Riders won the toss and elected to bat.
- The match was reduced to 16 overs and was later reduced to 9 overs per side due to rain.
- Lahore Qalandars were set a revised target of 111 runs from 9 overs due to rain.

=== Final ===
Final
6 December 2024
19:00 (N)
Scorecard

Rangpur Riders; 178/3 (20 overs)	v	Victoria; 122 (18.1 overs)
Soumya Sarkar 86* (54); Dominic Drakes 1/20 (4 overs)		Joe Clarke 40 (22); Harmeet Singh 3/19 (4 overs)

Rangpur Riders won by 56 runs
Providence Stadium, Providence
Umpires: Nigel Duguid (WI) and Patrick Gustard (WI)
Player of the match: Soumya Sarkar (Rangpur Riders)

- Rangpur Riders won the toss and elected to bat.

== Statistics ==
Most runs
Runs	Player	Team
188	Soumya Sarkar	Rangpur Riders
159	Shan Masood	Hampshire Hawks
154	Blake Macdonald	Victoria
152	Sanjay Krishnamurthi	Victoria
146	Steven Taylor	Rangpur Riders

- Source: ESPNcricinfo

Most wickets
Wickets	Player	Team
9	Callum Stow	Victoria
8	Harmeet Singh	Rangpur Riders
8	Dwaine Pretorius	Guyana Amazon Warriors
8	Imran Tahir	Guyana Amazon Warriors
8	Mahedi Hasan	Rangpur Riders

- Source: ESPNcricinfo
