= 2025 Global Super League =

Second season of the Global Super League

- Dates: 10 – 18 July 2025
- Administrator: Cricket West Indies
- Cricket format: Twenty20
- Tournament format(s): Round-robin and final
- Host: Guyana
- Champions: Guyana Amazon Warriors (1st title)
- Runners-up: Rangpur Riders
- Participants: 5
- Matches: 11
- Player of the series: Imran Tahir (Guyana Amazon Warriors)
- Most runs: Rahmanullah Gurbaz (Guyana Amazon Warriors) (139)
- Most wickets: Imran Tahir (Guyana Amazon Warriors) (14)
- Official website: GSLT20

The 2025 Global Super League was the second edition of the Global Super League. The tournament featured five teams from different countries which played 11 matches from 10 to 18 July 2025. All matches was played at Providence Stadium in Providence, Guyana. Rangpur Riders were the defending champions.

In the final, Guyana Amazon Warriors defeated Rangpur Riders by 32 runs to win the title.

== Format ==
Five teams played against each team in a single round-robin stage for a total of 10 matches. The top two teams based on the most points or net run rate advanced to the final match.

== Teams ==
Team	Domestic league	Captain	Head coach
Central Stags	Super Smash	Tom Bruce	Ben Smith
Dubai Capitals	International League T20	Gulbadin Naib	Hemang Badani
Guyana Amazon Warriors	Caribbean Premier League	Imran Tahir	Prasanna Agoram
Hobart Hurricanes	Big Bash League	Ben McDermott	Jeff Vaughan
Rangpur Riders	Bangladesh Premier League	Nurul Hasan	Mickey Arthur

== Squads ==
Central Stags	Dubai Capitals	Guyana Amazon Warriors	Hobart Hurricanes	Rangpur Riders
Tom Bruce (c); Doug Bracewell; Will Clark; Josh Clarkson; Dane Cleaver (wk); Toby Findlay; Matthew Forde; Dean Foxcroft; Curtis Heaphy; Jayden Lennox; Ajaz Patel; Angus Schaw; Blair Tickner; Will Young	Gulbadin Naib (c); Farhan Khan; Aryaman Varma; Zeeshan Nasser; Rovman Powell; Kaleem Sana; Said Shah; Ibrahim Masood; Sediqullah Atal; Kadeem Alleyne; Shakib Al Hasan; Niroshan Dickwella; Jesse Bootan; Dominic Drakes; Jordan Johnson; Qais Ahmad	Imran Tahir (c); Evin Lewis; Johnson Charles; Moeen Ali; Shimron Hetmyer; Saud Shakeel; Romario Shepherd; Dwaine Pretorius; Gudakesh Motie; Akeal Hosein; David Wiese; Rahmanullah Gurbaz (wk); Mark Adair; Sherfane Rutherford; Jewel Andrew; Shamar Springer; Amir Jangoo	Ben McDermott (c); Sahibzada Farhan; Nikhil Chaudhary; Jackson Bird; Billy Stanlake; Mohammad Nabi; Mohammad Nawaz; Odean Smith; Mac Wright; Jake Doran; Tim Ward; Raf MacMillan; Usama Mir; Fabian Allen; Marcus Bean; Bhanuka Rajapaksa	Nurul Hasan (c) (wk); Kyle Mayers; Tabraiz Shamsi; Azmatullah Omarzai; Harmeet Singh; Akif Javed; Khawaja Nafay; Soumya Sarkar; Mahidul Islam Ankon; Kamrul Islam; Saif Hassan; Khaled Ahmed; Rakibul Hasan; Yasir Ali; Ibrahim Zadran; Iftikhar Ahmed

== Venue ==
All matches will be held at the Providence Stadium.

Host: Guyana
Providence Stadium
Capacity: 15,000
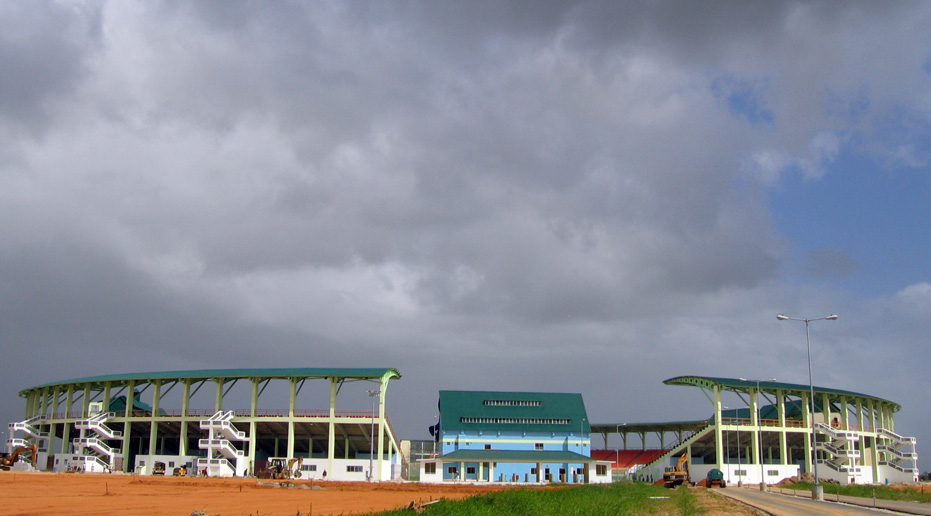

== Points table ==
Pos	Team	Pld	W	L	NR	Pts	NRR	Qualification
1	Rangpur Riders (R)	4	3	0	1	7	0.283	Advanced to the final
2	Guyana Amazon Warriors (C)	4	3	1	0	6	1.806	Advanced to the final
3	Central Stags	4	1	2	1	3	−1.200	
4	Hobart Hurricanes	4	1	3	0	2	−0.297	
5	Dubai Capitals	4	1	3	0	2	−0.833	

Source: ESPNcricinfo
(C) Champions; (R) Runners-up

=== Match summary ===
Team	Group matches				Play-offs
Team	1	2	3	4	Final
Central Stags	0	0	2	3	—
Dubai Capitals	2	2	2	2	—
Guyana Amazon Warriors	0	2	4	6	W
Hobart Hurricanes	2	2	2	2	—
Rangpur Riders	2	4	6	7	L

Win	Loss	Tie	No result	Eliminated

- Note: The total points at the end of each group match are listed.
- Note: Click on the points or results to see the match summary.

== League stage ==
Match 1
10 July 2025
10:00
Scorecard

Dubai Capitals; 165/7 (20 overs)	v	Central Stags; 143/8 (20 overs)
Shakib Al Hasan 58* (37); Angus Schaw 3/27 (4 overs)		Tom Bruce 34 (39); Shakib Al Hasan 4/13 (4 overs)

Dubai Capitals won by 22 runs
Providence Stadium, Providence
Umpires: Carl Tuckett (WI) and Chris Wright (WI)
Player of the match: Shakib Al Hasan (Dubai Capitals)

- Central Stags won the toss and elected to field.
- Jesse Bootan, Jordan Johnson and Aryaman Varma (Dubai Capitals) all made their T20 debuts.

Match 2
10 July 2025
19:00 (N)
Scorecard

Rangpur Riders; 162/5 (20 overs)	v	Guyana Amazon Warriors; 154 (19.1 overs)
Kyle Mayers 44* (31); Imran Tahir 2/21 (4 overs)		Johnson Charles 40 (28); Khaled Ahmed 4/36 (4 overs)

Rangpur Riders won by 8 runs
Providence Stadium, Providence
Umpires: Ryan Banwarie (WI) and Christopher Taylor (WI)
Player of the match: Khaled Ahmed (Rangpur Riders)

- Rangpur Riders won the toss and elected to bat.

Match 3
11 July 2025
10:00
Scorecard

Dubai Capitals; 141/8 (20 overs)	v	Hobart Hurricanes; 142/3 (17 overs)
Gulbadin Naib 31 (27); Mohammad Nabi 3/21 (4 overs); Fabian Allen 3/21 (4 overs)		Mac Wright 50 (47); Aryaman Varma 1/17 (2 overs)

Hobart Hurricanes won by 7 wickets
Providence Stadium, Providence
Umpires: Carl Tuckett (WI) and Chris Wright (WI)
Player of the match: Ben McDermott (Hobart Hurricanes)

- Hobart Hurricanes won the toss and elected to field.

Match 4
11 July 2025
19:00 (N)
Scorecard

Guyana Amazon Warriors; 158/6 (20 overs)	v	Central Stags; 92 (14.2 overs)
Rahmanullah Gurbaz 58 (47); Angus Schaw 2/24 (3 overs)		Will Young 26 (29); Imran Tahir 4/23 (4 overs)

Guyana Amazon Warriors won by 66 runs
Providence Stadium, Providence
Umpires: Ryan Banwarie (WI) and Christopher Taylor (WI)
Player of the match: Rahmanullah Gurbaz (Guyana Amazon Warriors)

- Central Stags won the toss and elected to field.

Match 5
13 July 2025
10:00
Scorecard

Rangpur Riders; 151/6 (20 overs)	v	Hobart Hurricanes; 150 (20 overs)
Kyle Mayers 67* (42); Usama Mir 3/15 (4 overs)		Mohammad Nabi 44 (36); Khaled Ahmed 4/26 (4 overs)

Rangpur Riders won by 1 run
Providence Stadium, Providence
Umpires: Christopher Taylor (WI) and Chris Wright (WI)
Player of the match: Khaled Ahmed (Rangpur Riders)

- Hobart Hurricanes won the toss and elected to field.

Match 6
13 July 2025
19:00 (N)
Scorecard

Guyana Amazon Warriors; 138/7 (20 overs)	v	Dubai Capitals; 81 (15.4 overs)
Moeen Ali 40 (38); Kaleem Sana 4/31 (4 overs)		Niroshan Dickwella 26 (18); Imran Tahir 4/12 (3.4 overs)

Guyana Amazon Warriors won by 57 runs
Providence Stadium, Providence
Umpires: Ryan Banwarie (WI) and Carl Tuckett (WI)
Player of the match: Imran Tahir (Guyana Amazon Warriors)

- Guyana Amazon Warriors won the toss and elected to bat.

Match 7
15 July 2025
19:00 (N)
Scorecard

Central Stags; 167/4 (20 overs)	v	Hobart Hurricanes; 151/8 (20 overs)
Tom Bruce 62 (36); Billy Stanlake 1/20 (3 overs)		Mohammad Nabi 43 (25); Ajaz Patel 2/18 (4 overs)

Central Stags won by 16 runs
Providence Stadium, Providence
Umpires: Christopher Taylor (WI) and Chris Wright (WI)
Player of the match: Curtis Heaphy (Central Stags)

- Central Stags won the toss and elected to bat.

Match 8
16 July 2025
10:00
Scorecard

Rangpur Riders; 158/5 (20 overs)	v	Dubai Capitals; 150 (19.2 overs)
Iftikhar Ahmed 41* (32); Rohan Mustafa 1/2 (1 over)		Sediqullah Atal 38 (31); Saif Hassan 3/20 (3 overs)

Rangpur Riders won by 8 runs
Providence Stadium, Providence
Umpires: Ryan Banwarie (WI) and Carl Tuckett (WI)
Player of the match: Iftikhar Ahmed (Rangpur Riders)

- Rangpur Riders won the toss and elected to bat.

Match 9
16 July 2025
19:00 (N)
Scorecard

Hobart Hurricanes; 125 (16.1 overs)	v	Guyana Amazon Warriors; 128/6 (16.3 overs)
Fabian Allen 28 (20); Gudakesh Motie 3/9 (3.1 overs)		Shimron Hetmyer 39 (10); Billy Stanlake 3/21 (3.3 overs)

Guyana Amazon Warriors won by 4 wickets
Providence Stadium, Providence
Umpires: Christopher Taylor (WI) and Chris Wright (WI)
Player of the match: Gudakesh Motie (Guyana Amazon Warriors)

- Hobart Hurricanes won the toss and elected to bat.

Match 10
17 July 2025
10:00
Scorecard

Rangpur Riders; 79 (13.5 overs)	v	Central Stags
Mahidul Islam Ankon 25 (20); Jayden Lennox 3/6 (2.5 overs)

No result
Providence Stadium, Providence
Umpires: Ryan Banwarie (WI) and Carl Tuckett (WI)

- Rangpur Riders won the toss and elected to bat.
- No further play was possible due to rain.

== Final ==
Final
18 July 2025
19:00 (N)
Scorecard

Guyana Amazon Warriors; 196/4 (20 overs)	v	Rangpur Riders; 164 (19.5 overs)
Johnson Charles 67 (48); Iftikhar Ahmed 1/12 (2 overs)		Iftikhar Ahmed 46 (29); Dwaine Pretorius 3/37 (4 overs)

Guyana Amazon Warriors won by 32 runs
Providence Stadium, Providence
Umpires: Christopher Taylor (WI) and Carl Tuckett (WI)
Player of the match: Rahmanullah Gurbaz (Guyana Amazon Warriors)

- Guyana Amazon Warriors won the toss and elected to bat.
