= 2026 Global Super League =

Third season of the Global Super League

- Dates: 23 July – 1 August 2026
- Administrator: Cricket West Indies
- Cricket format: Twenty20
- Tournament format(s): Single round-robin and playoffs
- Host: Guyana
- Champions: Guyana Amazon Warriors (2nd title)
- Runners-up: San Francisco Unicorns
- Participants: 5
- Matches: 12
- Player of the series: Mohammad Nabi (Guyana Amazon Warriors)
- Most runs: Tim Robinson (197)
- Most wickets: Mohammad Nabi (10)
- Official website: gslt20.com

The 2026 Global Super League was the third edition of the Global Super League. The tournament featured five teams from different countries that took part in the tournament from 23 July to 1 August 2026 with all matches played at Providence Stadium in Providence, Guyana.

Defending champions Guyana Amazon Warriors defeated San Francisco Unicorns by 6 runs in the final to secure their second consecutive title. Tim Robinson of San Francisco Unicorns scored the most runs (197) while Mohammad Nabi of Guyana Amazon Warriors took the most wickets (10) respectively and was named as the player of the series.

== Background ==
=== Format ===
The tournament featured a single round-robin stage of 10 matches among five teams. The first-placed team advanced directly to the final, while the second and third-placed teams contested a qualifier for the remaining spot in the final.

== Teams ==
Team	Domestic league	Captain	Head coach
(United Arab Emirates) Desert Vipers	International League T20	Shadab Khan	James Foster
Guyana Amazon Warriors	Caribbean Premier League	Imran Tahir	Prasanna Agoram
(Pakistan) Lahore Qalandars	Pakistan Super League	Michael Bracewell	Shaun Tait
(Australia) Perth Scorchers	Big Bash League	Ashton Turner	Simon Katich
(United States) San Francisco Unicorns	Major League Cricket	Hassan Khan	Cameron White

== Squads ==
Desert Vipers	Guyana Amazon Warriors	Lahore Qalandars	Perth Scorchers XI	San Francisco Unicorns
Shadab Khan (c) (Note: Chris Green was replaced by Shadab Khan in Desert Vipers's squad due to an injury.); Andries Gous (wk); Bevon Jacobs; Khary Pierre; Kyle Jamieson (Note: Jason Behrendorff was replaced by Kyle Jamieson in Desert Vipers's squad due to an injury.); Kyle Mayers; Matiullah Khan; Nathan Smith; Ramon Simmonds; Rilee Rossouw; Saiteja Mukkamalla (Note: Khuzaima Tanveer was replaced by Saiteja Mukkamalla in Desert Vipers's squad due to national commitments.); Sanjay Pahal; Vitel Lawes (Note: Daryl Mitchell was replaced by Vitel Lawes in Desert Vipers's squad due to an injury.); Vriitya Aravind (wk); Zachary Carter; ~~Chris Green (c)~~; ~~Daryl Mitchell~~; ~~Jason Behrendorff~~; ~~Khuzaima Tanveer~~	Imran Tahir (c); Dwaine Pretorius; Gudakesh Motie; Johnson Charles (wk); Jonathan van Lange (Note: Amir Jangoo was replaced by Jonathan van Lange in Guyana Amazon Warriors's squad due to national commitments.); Keemo Paul; Matthew Forde; Michael Palmer; Mohammad Haris (wk); Mohammad Nabi; Quentin Sampson; Rahmanullah Gurbaz (wk) (Note: Glenn Phillips was replaced by Rahmanullah Gurbaz in Guyana Amazon Warriors's squad due to an injury.); Romario Shepherd; Rovman Powell; Shimron Hetmyer; ~~Amir Jangoo~~; ~~Glenn Phillips~~	Michael Bracewell (c); Ali Shabbir; Abdullah Shafique; Delano Potgieter; Farhan Yousaf; Imran Randhawa; Mehran Mumtaz; Muhammad Basit; Mohammad Naeem; Parvez Hossain Emon; Shahab Khan; Shamyl Hussain; Shayan Jahangir (wk); Usama Mir	Ashton Turner (c); Ackeem Auguste; Akeal Hosein; Aaron Hardie; Ashton Agar; Brody Couch; D'Arcy Short; Dian Forrester; Jhye Richardson; Joel Curtis (wk); Mark Chapman; Sam Fanning; Sufyan Moqim; Usman Khan	Hassan Khan (c); Sanjay Krishnamurthi (vc); Anirudh Immanuel; Callum Stow; Connor Esterhuizen; Fabian Allen; Gideon Peters; Ghulam Mudassar; Hammad Azam; Karima Gore; Oliver Peake; Peter Siddle; Saideep Ganesh (wk); Tim Robinson

== Venue ==
All matches took place at the Providence Stadium in Providence, Guyana.

Venue in Guyana
Providence	2026 Global Super League (Guyana)
Providence Stadium	2026 Global Super League (Guyana)
Capacity: 15,000	2026 Global Super League (Guyana)
Providence Stadium outside	2026 Global Super League (Guyana)

== Teams and standings ==
=== Points table ===
Pos	Team	Pld	W	L	Pts	NRR	Qualification
1	Guyana Amazon Warriors	4	3	1	6	0.649	Advance to the Final
2	(United States) San Francisco Unicorns	4	2	2	4	0.136	Advance to the Qualifier
3	(United Arab Emirates) Desert Vipers	4	2	2	4	−0.074	Advance to the Qualifier
4	(Pakistan) Lahore Qalandars	4	2	2	4	−0.512	Eliminated
5	(Australia) Perth Scorchers	4	1	3	2	−0.152	Eliminated

Source: Cricinfo

=== Match summary ===
Team	Group matches				Playoffs	
Team	1	2	3	4	Q	F
Desert Vipers	0	0	2	4	L	
Guyana Amazon Warriors	2	4	6	6		W
Lahore Qalandars	2	4	4	4		
Perth Scorchers	0	0	0	2		
San Francisco Unicorns	0	2	2	4	W	L

Win	Loss	No result

- Note: The total points at the end of each group match are listed.
- Note: Click on the points (group matches) or W/L (playoffs) to see the match summary.

Visitor team →	DV	GAW	LQ	PS	SFU
Home team ↓	DV	GAW	LQ	PS	SFU
Desert Vipers				Vipers; 1 wicket	
Guyana Amazon Warriors	Warriors; 2 wickets		Warriors; 53 runs	Scorchers; 14 runs	Warriors; 3 wickets (D/L)
Lahore Qalandars	Qalandars; 38 runs			Qalandars; 16 runs	Unicorns; 7 wickets
Perth Scorchers					
San Francisco Unicorns	Vipers; 9 wickets			Unicorns; 5 runs	

Home team won	Visitor team won

- Note: Results listed are according to the home (horizontal) and visitor (vertical) teams.
- Note: Click on a result to see a summary of the match.

== League stage ==
Match 1
23 July 2026
10:00
Scorecard

Lahore Qalandars; 171/7 (20 overs)	v	Perth Scorchers XI; 155/7 (20 overs)
Shayan Jahangir 65 (45); Jhye Richardson 3/37 (4 overs)		Usman Khan 41 (32); Mohammad Imran 2/18 (4 overs)

Lahore Qalandars won by 16 runs
Providence Stadium, Providence
Umpires: Ryan Banwarie (WI) and Christopher Taylor (WI)
Player of the match: Farhan Yousaf (Lahore Qalandars)

- Perth Scorchers XI won the toss and elected to field.

Match 2
23 July 2026
19:00 (N)
Scorecard

San Francisco Unicorns; 156/6 (20 overs)	v	Guyana Amazon Warriors; 131/7 (15.3 overs)
Hammad Azam 61* (45); Mohammad Nabi 2/33 (4 overs)		Rahmanullah Gurbaz 31 (21); Hassan Khan 2/25 (4 overs)

Guyana Amazon Warriors won by 3 wickets (DLS method)
Providence Stadium, Providence
Umpires: Gregory Brathwaite (WI) and Carl Tuckett (WI)
Player of the match: Rovman Powell (Guyana Amazon Warriors)

- San Francisco Unicorns won the toss and elected to bat.
- Guyana Amazon Warriors were set a revised target of 131 runs in 16 overs due to rain.

Match 3
24 July 2026
10:00
Scorecard

Lahore Qalandars; 176/4 (20 overs)	v	Desert Vipers; 138/9 (20 overs)
Parvez Hossain Emon 47* (33); Khary Pierre 2/14 (3 overs)		Andries Gous 56 (38); Usama Mir 4/23 (4 overs)

Lahore Qalandars won by 38 runs
Providence Stadium, Providence
Umpires: Ryan Banwarie (WI) and Christopher Taylor (WI)
Player of the match: Michael Bracewell (Lahore Qalandars)

- Lahore Qalandars won the toss and elected to bat.
- Vitel Lawes (Desert Vipers) made his T20 debut.

Match 4
25 July 2026
19:00 (N)
Scorecard

Desert Vipers; 205/6 (20 overs)	v	Guyana Amazon Warriors; 206/8 (19.3 overs)
Rilee Rossouw 61 (48); Imran Tahir 2/37 (4 overs)		Romario Shepherd 52 (21); Shadab Khan 3/40 (4 overs)

Guyana Amazon Warriors won by 2 wickets
Providence Stadium, Providence
Umpires: Gregory Brathwaite (WI) and Carl Tuckett (WI)
Player of the match: Romario Shepherd (Guyana Amazon Warriors)

- Guyana Amazon Warriors won the toss and elected to field.
- Jonathan van Lange (Guyana Amazon Warriors) and Zachary Carter (Desert Vipers) both made their T20 debuts.
- This was the highest successful run chase in the GSL.
- Romario Shepherd (Guyana Amazon Warriors) scored the fastest half-century (off 17 balls) in the GSL.

Match 5
26 July 2026
10:00
Scorecard

San Francisco Unicorns; 152/8 (20 overs)	v	Perth Scorchers XI; 147/9 (20 overs)
Hammad Azam 64* (46); Sufyan Moqim 3/21 (4 overs)		D'Arcy Short 43 (38); Ghulam Mudassar 4/32 (4 overs)

San Francisco Unicorns won by 5 runs
Providence Stadium, Providence
Umpires: Ryan Banwarie (WI) and Christopher Taylor (WI)
Player of the match: Hammad Azam (San Francisco Unicorns)

- San Francisco Unicorns won the toss and elected to bat.

Match 6
26 July 2026
19:00 (N)
Scorecard

Guyana Amazon Warriors; 164/9 (20 overs)	v	Lahore Qalandars; 111 (17.2 overs)
Rahmanullah Gurbaz 65 (35); Michael Bracewell 2/18 (4 overs)		Farhan Yousaf 28 (19); Gudakesh Motie 4/15 (4 overs)

Guyana Amazon Warriors won by 53 runs
Providence Stadium, Providence
Umpires: Gregory Brathwaite (WI) and Carl Tuckett (WI)
Player of the match: Gudakesh Motie (Guyana Amazon Warriors)

- Lahore Qalandars won the toss and elected to field.

Match 7
27 July 2026
19:00 (N)
Scorecard

San Francisco Unicorns; 151/7 (20 overs)	v	Desert Vipers; 152/1 (16.1 overs)
Tim Robinson 46 (35); Shadab Khan 4/13 (4 overs)		Zachary Carter 55 (29); Anirudh Immanuel 1/26 (4 overs)

Desert Vipers won by 9 wickets
Providence Stadium, Providence
Umpires: Ryan Banwarie (WI) and Christopher Taylor (WI)
Player of the match: Zachary Carter (Desert Vipers)

- San Francisco Unicorns won the toss and elected to bat.

Match 8
28 July 2026
19:00 (N)
Scorecard

Perth Scorchers XI; 112/6 (20 overs)	v	Desert Vipers; 116/9 (19.5 overs)
Andre Fletcher 40 (47); Khary Pierre 2/14 (4 overs)		Rilee Rossouw 50 (31); Akeal Hosein 4/15 (4 overs)

Desert Vipers won by 1 wicket
Providence Stadium, Providence
Umpires: Gregory Brathwaite (WI) and Carl Tuckett (WI)
Player of the match: Rilee Rossouw (Desert Vipers)

- Desert Vipers won the toss and elected to field.

Match 9
29 July 2026
10:00
Scorecard

Lahore Qalandars; 152/6 (20 overs)	v	San Francisco Unicorns; 156/3 (15.2 overs)
Shayan Jahangir 61 (50); Callum Stow 4/25 (4 overs)		Hassan Khan 53* (33); Shamim Hossain 1/13 (1 over)

San Francisco Unicorns won by 7 wickets
Providence Stadium, Providence
Umpires: Ryan Banwarie (WI) and Christopher Taylor (WI)
Player of the match: Callum Stow (San Francisco Unicorns)

- Lahore Qalandars won the toss and elected to bat.

Match 10
29 July 2026
19:00 (N)
Scorecard

Perth Scorchers XI; 135 (20 overs)	v	Guyana Amazon Warriors; 121 (16.1 overs)
Brody Couch 43 (30); Mohammad Nabi 3/12 (4 overs)		Rahmanullah Gurbaz 42 (16); Ashton Turner 3/20 (4 overs)

Perth Scorchers XI won by 14 runs
Providence Stadium, Providence
Umpires: Gregory Brathwaite (WI) and Carl Tuckett (WI)
Player of the match: Brody Couch (Perth Scorchers XI)

- Guyana Amazon Warriors won the toss and elected to field.

== Playoffs ==
=== Bracket ===
Qualifier			Final
			1	Guyana Amazon Warriors	85 (18.5 overs)
2	San Francisco Unicorns	126/2 (16.1 overs)	QW	San Francisco Unicorns	79 (18.3 overs)
3	Desert Vipers	122/7 (20 overs)

=== Qualifier ===
Qualifier
31 July 2026
19:00 (N)
Scorecard

Desert Vipers; 122/7 (20 overs)	v	San Francisco Unicorns; 126/2 (16.1 overs)
Vriitya Aravind 29* (20); Fabian Allen 3/20 (4 overs)		Tim Robinson 68* (54); Khary Pierre 2/22 (4 overs)

San Francisco Unicorns won by 8 wickets
Providence Stadium, Providence
Umpires: Ryan Banwarie (WI) and Carl Tuckett (WI)
Player of the match: Tim Robinson (San Francisco Unicorns)

- San Francisco Unicorns won the toss and elected to field.

=== Final ===
Final
1 August 2026
19:00 (N)
Scorecard

Guyana Amazon Warriors; 85 (18.5 overs)	v	San Francisco Unicorns; 79 (18.3 overs)
Matthew Forde 28 (23); Anirudh Immanuel 3/7 (4 overs)		Oliver Peake 31 (28); Mohammad Nabi 3/12 (4 overs)

Guyana Amazon Warriors won by 6 runs
Providence Stadium, Providence
Umpires: Gregory Brathwaite (WI) and Christopher Taylor (WI)
Player of the match: Dwaine Pretorius (Guyana Amazon Warriors)

- Guyana Amazon Warriors won the toss and elected to bat.

== Statistics ==
Most runs
Runs	Player	Team
197	Tim Robinson	San Francisco Unicorns
177	Rahmanullah Gurbaz	Guyana Amazon Warriors
169	Rilee Rossouw	Desert Vipers
165	Hammad Azam	San Francisco Unicorns
154	Shayan Jahangir	Lahore Qalandars

- Source: Cricinfo

Most wickets
Wkts	Player	Team
10	Mohammad Nabi	Guyana Amazon Warriors
9	Khary Pierre	Desert Vipers
8
8	Gudakesh Motie	Guyana Amazon Warriors
8	Shadab Khan	Desert Vipers
8	Dwaine Pretorius	Guyana Amazon Warriors

- Source: Cricinfo
