= Global Super League =

International T20 cricket tournament

- Administrator: Cricket West Indies
- Format: Twenty20
- First edition: 2024
- Latest edition: 2026
- Next edition: 2027
- Tournament format: Round robin tournament and Final
- Number of teams: 5
- Host: Guyana
- Current champion: Guyana Amazon Warriors (2nd title)
- Most successful: Guyana Amazon Warriors (2 titles)
- Most runs: Soumya Sarkar (277)
- Most wickets: Imran Tahir (22)
- Website: www.gslt20.com

The Global Super League, known as the ExxonMobil Guyana GSLT20 for sponsorship reasons, is an invitational Twenty20 cricket competition played in Guyana.

The tournament is organised by Cricket West Indies (CWI) and is chaired by Clive Lloyd. The inaugural season of the league was played in November 2024. Five teams from different parts of the world take part.

== History ==
The league's first season took place from 26 November to 7 December 2024. The teams which competed were Guyana Amazon Warriors, the 2023 Caribbean Premier League champions, English county team Hampshire, Lahore Qalandars from the Pakistan Super League, Rangpur Riders from the Bangladesh Premier League and Australian state team Victoria. The final was held on 6 December, at Providence Stadium, with Rangpur Riders defeating Victoria by 56 runs.

The second season took take place in July 2025. Guyana Amazon Warriors and Rangpur Riders competed again, joined by New Zealand team Central Districts, Dubai Capitals from the International League T20, and Australian Big Bash League franchise Hobart Hurricanes. Guyana Warriors won in the final against the Rangpur Riders by 32 Runs.

The third season took take place in July 2026. Guyana Amazon Warriors competed again, joined by American team San Francisco Unicorns from the Major League Cricket, Desert Vipers from the International League T20, Lahore Qalandars from the Pakistan Super League and Australian Big Bash League franchise Perth Scorchers. Defending champions Guyana Amazon Warriors defeated San Francisco Unicorns by 6 runs in the final to secure their second consecutive title.

== Venue ==
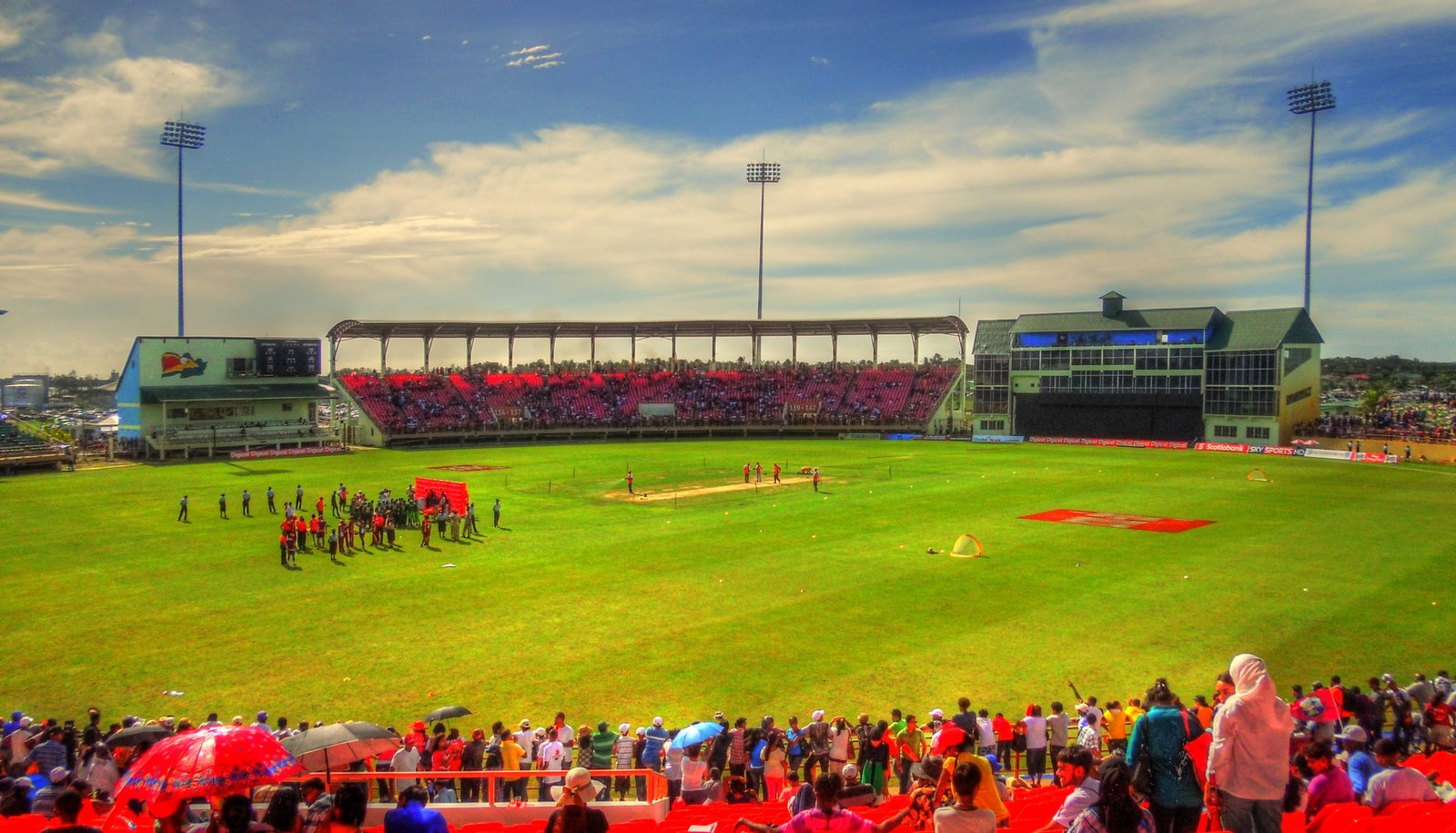
Providence Stadium

All matches are held at the Providence Stadium.

== Participants ==
Season League	2024	2025	2026	2027
Bangladesh Premier League	Rangpur Riders		DNP	
Twenty20 Big Bash/Big Bash League	Cricket Victoria	Hobart Hurricanes	Perth Scorchers XI	
Caribbean Premier League	Guyana Amazon Warriors			
International League T20	DNP	Dubai Capitals	Desert Vipers	
Major League Cricket	DNP		San Francisco Unicorns	
Pakistan Super League	Lahore Qalandars	DNP	Lahore Qalandars	
Super Smash	DNP	Central Stags	DNP	
Vitality Blast	Hampshire Hawks	DNP		

== Seasons ==
Season	Final			Leading run scorer	Leading wicket taker	Player of the series	No. of matches
Season	Winners	Result	Runners-up	Leading run scorer	Leading wicket taker	Player of the series	No. of matches
2024	Rangpur Riders	Riders won by 56 runs Scorecard	Victoria	Soumya Sarkar (RR) (188)	Callum Stow (Victoria) (9)	Soumya Sarkar (RR)	11
2025	Guyana Amazon Warriors	Amazon Warriors won by 32 runs Scorecard	Rangpur Riders	Rahmanullah Gurbaz (GAW) (139)	Imran Tahir (GAW) (14)	Imran Tahir (GAW)	11
2026	Guyana Amazon Warriors	Amazon Warriors won by 6 runs Scorecard	San Francisco Unicorns	Tim Robinson (SFU) (197)	Mohammad Nabi (GAW) (10)	Mohammad Nabi (GAW)	12

== See also ==
- Champions League Twenty20
