= Rishad Hossain =

Bangladeshi cricketer (born 2002)

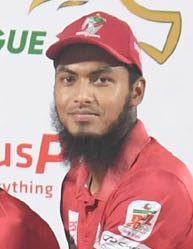
- Hossain in 2025

Personal information
- Full name: Mohammad Rishad Hossain
- Born: 15 July 2002 (age 24); Nilphamari, Bangladesh
- Height: 192 cm (6 ft 4 in)
- Batting: Right-handed
- Bowling: Right arm leg break
- Role: All-rounder

International information
- National side: Bangladesh (2023–present)
- ODI debut (cap 148): 20 December 2023 v New Zealand
- Last ODI: 18 October 2025 v West Indies
- ODI shirt no.: 22
- T20I debut (cap 80): 31 March 2023 v Ireland
- Last T20I: 2 May 2026 v New Zealand
- T20I shirt no.: 22

Domestic team information
- Years: Team
- 2019–present: Rangpur Division
- 2024: Comilla Victorians
- 2025: Fortune Barishal
- 2025: Lahore Qalandars
- 2025/2026–present: Hobart Hurricanes (squad no. 2)

Career statistics
Competition	ODI	T20I	FC	LA
Matches	12	50	21	33
Runs scored	134	204	482	324
Batting average	16.75	9.71	17.21	15.42
100s/50s	0/0	0/1	0/1	0/0
Top score	48*	53	99	48*
Balls bowled	619	986	2,282	1,520
Wickets	16	61	31	55
Bowling average	34.06	21.81	45.38	22.94
5 wickets in innings	1	0	2	2
10 wickets in match	0	0	0	0
Best bowling	6/35	3/18	5/50	6/35
Catches/stumpings	7/–	29/–	27/0	17/-
Medal record
Men's cricket
Representing Bangladesh
Asian Games
Bronze medal – third place	2022 Hangzhou	Team
- Source: Cricinfo, 19 October 2025

Rishad Hossain (Bengali: রিশাদ হোসেন; born 15 July 2002) is a Bangladeshi cricketer from Nilphamari district. He is a right-handed batter and leg spinner. He was the joint highest spin bowling wicket taker in the 2024 ICC Men's T20 World Cup.

== Domestic career ==
He made his first-class debut for North Zone in the 2018–19 Bangladesh Cricket League on 5 December 2018. He made his Twenty20 debut for Khelaghar Samaj Kallyan Samity in the 2018–19 Dhaka Premier Division Twenty20 Cricket League on 25 February 2019. In November 2019, he was selected to play for the Rangpur Rangers in the 2019–20 Bangladesh Premier League.

In February 2021, he was selected in the Bangladesh Emerging squad for their home series against the Ireland Wolves. He made his List A debut on 24 March 2022, for Khelaghar Samaj Kallyan Samity in the 2021–22 Dhaka Premier Division Cricket League.

In June 2024, he was signed by Toronto Nationals for the 2024 Global T20 Canada. He missed the tournament for visa issues.

In September 2024, he was picked by Hobart Hurricanes for the 2025 BBL. He got denied to play because of conflicting schedules with BPL and a lack of necessary clearance by the Bangladesh Cricket Board. In the following season, he claimed 15 wickets and finished as the leading wicket-taker for the Hurricanes. His best bowling figures were 3 for 26 against the Adelaide Strikers. He was named Hurricanes's BBL player of the year.

"Rishad Hossain is a T20 star in the making - he needs to be better utilised in his own country"

— Abhishek Mukherjee

Rishad was named in the Rangpur Riders squad for the 2024 Global Super League. Later he won the GSL 2024 with Rangpur Riders.

In January 2025, he joined Lahore Qalandars in the silver category for PSL 10. On his debut of the PSL, he scored 1 run of 1 ball and achieved a bowling figure of 3/31 of 4 overs.

== International career ==
=== 2023–2024 ===
In March 2023, he earned his maiden call-up to the Bangladesh cricket team for their T20I series against Ireland. He made his Twenty20 International (T20I) debut for Bangladesh, on 31 March 2023, against Ireland. His first scoring shot in international cricket was a six which he scored on his T20I debut off the third delivery he faced.

In December 2023, he was named in Bangladesh's squad for their white-ball tour to New Zealand. He made his One Day International (ODI) debut on 20 December 2023 where he smashed a six off the very first delivery, only the second (Note: after Shamim Hossain) Bangladeshi player to do so, coming into bat at number nine position.

=== 2024–2025 ===
In February 2024, he was named in the Bangladesh limited-overs squad for the series against Sri Lanka. During the 3rd T20I, he scored his maiden half-century in Twenty20 Internationals, scoring 53 runs off 30 balls with 7 sixes, the most by a Bangladeshi batter in T20Is at that time.

In May 2024, he was named in Bangladesh's squad for the 2024 ICC Men's T20 World Cup tournament. He picked 14 wickets from 7 matches to set the record of most wickets by a Bangladeshi bowler in a single edition of the T20 World Cup. He is the 6th most wicket taker in the 2024 ICC Men's T20 World Cup.

Rishad was named in the Rangpur Riders squad for the 2024 Global Super League. Later he won the GSL 2024 with Rangpur Riders.

=== 2025–2026 ===
In January 2025, he was named in Bangladesh's squad for the 2025 ICC Champions Trophy.
