= Rangpur Riders =

Bangladeshi franchise cricket team

- রংপুর রাইডার্স
- League: Bangladesh Premier League

Personnel
- Captain: Litton Das
- Coach: Mickey Arthur
- Owner: Toggi Sports

Team information
- City: Rangpur, Bangladesh
- Founded: 2012; 14 years ago: (2012: Rangpur Riders; 2019: Rangpur Rangers; 2023: Rangpur Riders)
- Home ground: Rangpur Stadium, Rangpur
- Capacity: 25,000

History
- BPL wins: 1: 2017–18
- Global Super League wins: 1: 2024
- Official website: rangpurriders.net
T20I kit

Rangpur Riders (Bengali: রংপুর রাইডার্স) is a professional franchise cricket team based in Rangpur. The Riders compete in the Bangladesh Premier League (BPL), the premier cricket league in Bangladesh. This team took part in the Global Super League and in the inaugural 2024 season became the champion, gaining their maiden title and in the 2025 season, they became runners-up.

Although the ownership of the team has changed multiple times, the team structure has stayed in its original form since the foundation of the team.

In the 5th edition of BPL, they defeated Dhaka Dynamites in the finals to win their first title.

== History ==
The Rangpur Riders was established in 2012, after the first season of the Bangladesh Premier League. The team was bought by Mustafa Rafiqul Islam, owner of iSports Limited. The franchise rights were bought for US$1.1 million at a closed-door auction. Haque Brothers Industries Limited also participated in the bid, but failed to outbid iSports Limited, a sister concern of Flora Telecom. The Riders joined the tournament in 2013 as the seventh team, representing the newly declared Rangpur Division. The team ownership was transferred to Sohana Sports, which is now managed by Bashundhara Group, a pioneering conglomerate of Bangladesh.

On 16 November 2019, the Bangladesh Cricket Board (BCB) announced Incepta Pharmaceuticals as the sponsor of the team, and it was renamed Rangpur Rangers. The team was excluded from the 2021–22 Bangladesh Premier League. In September 2022, Bashundhara Group acquired the ownership and renamed the team back to Rangpur Riders. Rangpur and American Minor League Cricket club Atlanta Fire co-own the Atlanta Riders, who began play in the US Masters T10 league in 2023. In November 2025, Toggi Sports, part of Bashundhara Group, got ownership of the team.

== Season overview ==
=== Debut season: Season two ===
Rangpur Riders were the newest franchise during the second edition of the league. The team began its league run with Nasir Hossain as their icon player and Abdur Razzak (cricketer) as the captain. Pakistani legendary spinner Saqlain Mushtaq was appointed as the coach. The Riders picked up their first victory against Chittagong Kings, winning by 6 wickets. The team ended the season with five wins and seven losses, resulting in a point-table tie with Duronto Rajshahi, later dropping off from the playoffs due to a lower net run rate than Rajshahi. Nasir Hossain was the highest paid cricketer on the team with a salary of US$208,000.

=== Season three ===
Rangpur Riders got its hope for this season when they purchased Shakib Al Hasan as their icon player for this season in the newly introduced player draft policy instead of bidding like the previous 2 seasons.

This season, Rangpur Riders hired Shane Jurgensen as their head coach to make a skilled team, as per their promise in the player draft. This season they did pick some well known local players, like Shakib Al Hasan, Arafat Sunny, Soumya Sarkar, Al-Amin, Saqlain Sajib, and a few more, along with some international T20 specialist Lendl Simmons, Darren Sammy, Sachithra Senanayake, and Mohammad Nabi, with some experienced faces, like Misbah-ul-Haq.

This well balanced team ended the season by capturing 3rd position in the league but could not qualify for the final thanks to a loss against Barisal Bulls in the 2nd qualifier after a win against Dhaka Dynamites in the eliminator.

=== Season four ===
Prior to the fourth season, the ownership of the Riders was transferred to Sohana Sports. The team rearranged its playing squad with Shahid Afridi, Soumya Sarkar, Mohammad Shehzad, and many other acclaimed cricketers. Shakib Al Hasan, the icon player from the previous edition, was transferred to Dhaka Dynamites. The club also included rising star Babar Azam and hard-hitting all-rounder Dasun Shanaka in their squad, and signing Sohag Gazi and Rubel Hossain proved beneficial for the bowling attack. Having Ziaur Rahman in the playing eleven, who was also picked in the draft, seemed useful as he provided some big hits when batting. Retaining Mohammad Mithun was a good call, as he was the second-highest run scorer for the team that season, and Arafat Sunny took magical figures of 3/0 against Khulna Titans, which proves he was also worth retaining.

The Riders started the season strong with a dominating victory against the Chittagong Vikings, winning the match by 9 wickets with Mohammad Shahzad scoring 80 runs. The team continued its domination during its second game, getting Khulna Titans all out for 44, the lowest ever total in the Bangladesh Premier League. They lost their way later on and finished fifth in the team rankings, thus not qualifying for the playoffs.

=== Season five ===
Previous icon player Soumya Sarkar left the team, resulting in the team announcing Mashrafe Mortaza as the new icon and captain. They signed Jamaican T20 specialist Chris Gayle, one of the cleanest hitters of the cricket ball; former New Zealand captain and opener Brendon McCullum; and Lankan genuine swinger Lasith Malinga. They also signed two English seam bowling all-rounders, David Willey and Ravi Bopara. Their other squad members include West Indian leggie Samuel Badree and more. They retained Rubel Hossain and Sohag Gazi. Both of them bowled well last season. The third retained player is Mohammad Mithun, who was their second-highest run scorer last season. They picked English batter Sam Hain, Afghan batting all-rounder Samiullah Shenwari, experienced orthodox spinner Abdur Razzak, and more from the draft.

They picked 8 locals and 3 foreigners from the draft, which is 1 more than the minimum requirement for each category. Their first pick was Shahriar Nafees, a prominent Bangladeshi batsman. The surprise picks were inexperienced and little-known Afghan slow left-arm wrist-spin bowler Zahir Khan.

Rangpur began their campaign with a win against Rajshahi Kings. They suffered a few defeats on the way but managed to qualify for the playoffs, finishing 4th in the league stage, just enough for the qualification. In the eliminator against Khulna Titans, Chris Gayle won them the match with an unbeaten 126. In the 2nd qualifier against Comilla Victorians, Johnson Charles won them the match with his maiden century in T20 cricket. In the final, Chris Gayle once again smacked a hundred, this time a record 146*. The bowlers also did very well, which won them their first championship. Their skipper, Mashrafe Mortaza, has now won 4 BPLs out of 5 for 3 different teams.

=== Season six ===
Riders have retained Mashrafe Mortaza, Mohammad Mithun, Nazmul Islam, Ravi Bopara, and Chris Gayle. They have also signed English opener Alex Hales and South African batsman AB de Villiers. AB will play 9 matches and more if the team advances to the playoffs.

In the draft, they signed the likes of Shafiul Islam, Abul Hasan, Sohag Gazi, and Nahidul Islam. They signed Rilee Rossouw, Benny Howell, and Oshane Thomas from the international category.

=== Season seven (2019–20) ===
The captain, Mashrafe Mortaza, was released, and Shakib Al Hasan, the captain of Dhaka Dynamites, left the team and joined Riders for the season. During the player's direct signing period, a conflict of interests arose between the BCB and all other franchises. Subsequently, in September 2019, the BCB made some changes in rules and regulations for this season, and eliminating all franchises, the BCB took over the charge of the current BPL and decided to run this current tournament by the board itself and named the tournament Bangabandhu BPL T20 2019 in order to pay homage to Sheikh Mujibur Rahman on his birth centenary. Apparently the team was owned by BCB itself, but later Incepta Pharmaceuticals became the team sponsor of Rangpur. They renamed it to Rangpur Rangers.

=== Season 10 ===
Riders of Hope got its hope for this season when they purchased Shakib Al Hasan as their icon player for this season in the newly introduced player draft policy instead of bidding like the previous 2 seasons. Overseas players include Babar Azam, Mohammad Nabi, Azmatullah Omarzai, Jimmy Neesham, and Imran Tahir.

The Rangpur Riders opened their campaign against their biggest rival, Fortune Barishal. The game was played on 20 January. It ended in Rangpur Riders being defeated by Fortune Barishal by five wickets to lose the opening match.

=== Season 11 ===
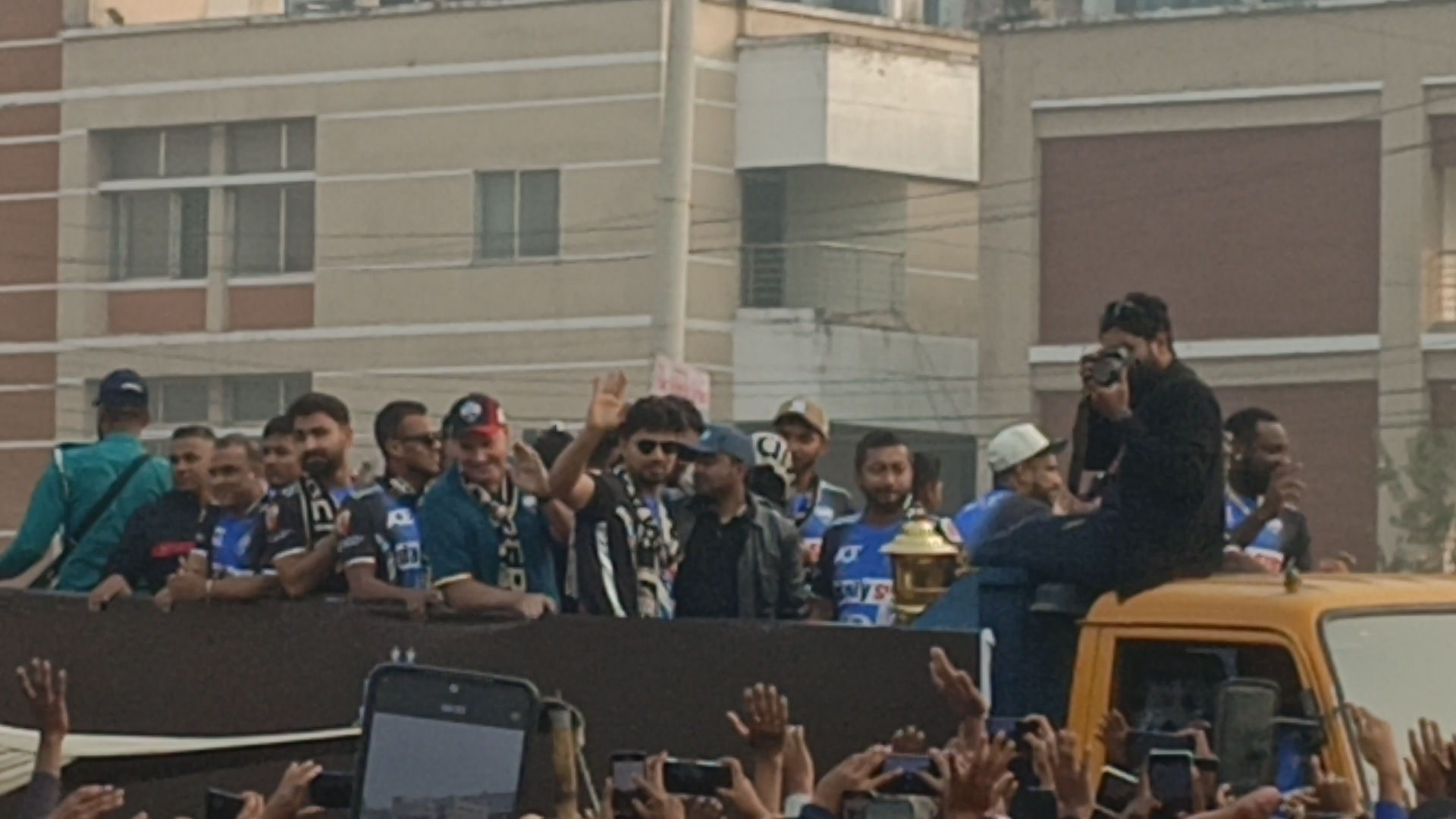
Riders team in the Trophy Tour

The 2025 season started fantastically for the Rangpur Riders as they remained undefeated for the first 8 matches but struggled ever since and were eliminated from the tournament in the Eliminator 1 of the playoffs.

The squad consisted of talented young local players such as Nahid Rana and Rakibul Hasan as well as veterans such as Soumya Sarker and Nurul Hasan Sohan. Their overseas player collection was decent as it included the likes of Alex Hales, Iftikhar Ahmed, Khushdil Shah, Andre Russell, Tim David, James Vince, AM Ghazanfar, and Pakistani pacer Akif Javed, the latter going on to become one of the leading wicket takers of the entire season.

== Rivalries ==
=== North Bengal Derby ===
The Rajshahi-Rangpur rivalry is a cricket rivalry between two franchises, the Rajshahi Warriors and the Rangpur Riders, in the Bangladesh Premier League. This rivalry is often referred to as the "North Bengal Derby". Both teams have won the BPL trophy once. Rajshahi has reached the playoffs a total of four times, while Rangpur has also made it to the playoffs four times.

=== North-South Derby ===
The Barishal-Rangpur rivalry is a cricket rivalry between the BPL teams of Fortune Barishal and Rangpur Riders in the Bangladesh Premier League. It is the biggest rivalry of the BPL and is often referred to as the North-South Derby of the Bangladesh Premier League. Shakib and Tamim incident started the hype of the rivalry and is still constant. The rivalry became more intense when, during the 2024 Bangladesh Premier League faceoff between the two teams in playoff round. Rangpur won 1 title and played playoffs 4 times. Other hand Barishal played in final 4 times and won 1 time, also played playoffs 1 time in BPL.

== Seasons ==
=== Bangladesh Premier League ===
Year	League standing	Final standing
2013	5th out of 7	League stage
2015	3rd out of 6	Playoffs
2016	3rd out of 7	League stage
2017	4th out of 7	Champions
2019	1st out of 7	Playoffs
2019–20	6th out of 7	League stage
2022	Did not participate	
2023	3rd out of 7	Playoffs
2024	1st out of 7	Playoffs
2025	3rd out of 7	Playoffs
2026	3rd out of 6	Playoffs

=== Global Super League ===
Year	League standing	Final standing
2024	2nd out of 5	Champions
2025	1st out of 5	Runners-up

== Current squads ==
=== Bangladesh Premier League ===
The squad of Rangpur Riders for 2025-26 season is:

Name	Nationality	Batting style	Bowling style	Notes
Batters
Tawhid Hridoy	Bangladesh	Right-handed	—N/a	
Dawid Malan	England	Left-handed	Right-arm leg-break	Overseas
Khawaja Nafay	Pakistan	Right-handed	Right-arm off-break	Overseas
Wayne Madsen	Italy	Right-handed	Right-arm off-break	Overseas
Emilio Gay	Italy	Left-handed	Right-arm medium	Overseas
Iftikhar Hossain Ifti	Bangladesh	Left-handed	—N/a	
Wicket-keepers
Nurul Hasan Sohan	Bangladesh	Right-handed	—N/a	Captain
Litton Das	Bangladesh	Right-handed	—N/a	
Muhammad Akhlaq	Pakistan	Right-handed	Right-arm medium	Overseas
All-rounders
Mahmudullah	Bangladesh	Right-handed	Right-arm off-break	—N/a
Khushdil Shah	Pakistan	Left-handed	Slow left-arm orthodox	Overseas
Kyle Mayers	West Indies	Left-handed	Right-arm medium	Overseas
Faheem Ashraf	Pakistan	Left-handed	Right-arm fast-medium	Overseas
Nayeem Hasan	Bangladesh	Right-handed	Right-arm off-break	—N/a
Mehedi Hasan Sohag	Bangladesh	Right-handed	Right-arm leg-break	—N/a
Iftikhar Ahmed	Pakistan	Right-handed	Right-arm off-break	Overseas
Pace bowlers
Mustafizur Rahman	Bangladesh	Left-handed	Left-arm fast-medium	—N/a
Akif Javed	Pakistan	Right-handed	Left-arm fast	Overseas
Nahid Rana	Bangladesh	Right-handed	Right-arm fast	—N/a
Kamrul Islam Rabbi	Bangladesh	Right-handed	Right-arm medium fast	—N/a
Mrittunjoy Chowdhury	Bangladesh	Left-handed	Left-arm fast-medium	—N/a
Abdul Halim	Bangladesh	Right-handed	Right-arm medium	—N/a
Spin bowlers
Rakibul Hasan	Bangladesh	Left-handed	Slow left-arm orthodox	—N/a
Sufiyan Muqeem	Pakistan	Left-handed	Left-arm Chinaman	Overseas
Aliss Islam	Bangladesh	Right-handed	Right-arm off-break	—N/a

=== Global Super League ===
The squad of the 2025 season:

Name	Nationality	Batting style	Bowling style	Notes
Batters
Saif Hassan	Bangladesh	Right-handed	Right arm off break	
Naim Sheikh	Bangladesh	Left-handed		
Khawaja Nafay	Pakistan	Right-handed		Overseas player
Yasir Ali Chowdhury	Bangladesh	Right-handed		
Wicket-keepers
Nurul Hasan	Bangladesh	Right-handed		
Mahidul Ankon	Bangladesh	Right-handed		
Ibrahim Zadran	Afghanistan	Right-handed		Overseas player
All-rounders
Kyle Mayers	West Indies	Left-handed	Right-arm medium	Overseas player
Iftikhar Ahmed	Pakistan	Right-handed	Right-arm off break	Overseas player
Azmatullah Omarzai	Afghanistan	Right-handed	Right-arm fast-medium	
Soumya Sarkar	Bangladesh	Left-handed	Right arm fast-medium	
Mohammad Saifuddin	Bangladesh	Left-handed	Right arm fast-medium	
Pace bowlers
Kamrul Islam Rabbi	Bangladesh	Right-handed	Right-arm fast-medium	
Akif Javed	Pakistan	Right-handed	Right-arm fast-medium	Overseas player
Khaled Ahmed	Bangladesh	Right-handed	Right-arm fast-medium	
Spin bowlers
Rakibul Hasan	Bangladesh	Left-handed	Slow left-arm orthodox	
Tabriaz Shamsi	South Africa	Right-handed	Left-arm wrist spin	Overseas player
Harmeet Singh	United States	Left-handed	Slow Left arm Orthodox	Overseas player

== Coaching staff ==
The coaching panel of Rangpur Riders for the BPL season 2025-26 is:

Name	Role
Mickey Arthur	Head coach
Mohammad Ashraful	Batting coach
Mohammad Rafique	Bowling coach
