= Bangladeshi cricket team in New Zealand in 2023–24 =

International cricket tour

	New Zealand	Bangladesh
- Dates: 17 – 31 December 2023
Captains	Tom Latham (ODIs); Mitchell Santner (T20Is)	Najmul Hossain Shanto

One Day International series
- Results: New Zealand won the 3-match series 2–1
Most runs	Will Young (220)	Soumya Sarkar (173)
Most wickets	William O'Rourke (5)	Shoriful Islam (6)
- Player of the series: Will Young (NZ)

Twenty20 International series
- Results: 3-match series drawn 1–1
Most runs	James Neesham (76)	Liton Das (42)
Most wickets	Mitchell Santner (5)	Shoriful Islam (6)
- Player of the series: Shoriful Islam (Ban)

The Bangladesh cricket team toured New Zealand in December 2023 to play three One Day International (ODIs) and three Twenty20 International (T20I) matches. The T20I series formed part of both teams' preparation for the 2024 ICC Men's T20 World Cup tournament.

Prior to this tour, New Zealand toured Bangladesh in September, November and December 2023 to play three ODIs and two Test matches.

== Squads ==
New Zealand		Bangladesh	
ODIs	T20Is	ODIs	T20Is
Tom Latham (c); Adithya Ashok; Finn Allen; Tom Blundell (wk); Mark Chapman; Josh Clarkson; Jacob Duffy; ~~Kyle Jamieson~~; Adam Milne; Henry Nicholls; William O'Rourke; Rachin Ravindra; Ben Sears; Ish Sodhi; Will Young	Mitchell Santner (c); ~~Kane Williamson (c)~~; Finn Allen; Mark Chapman; Jacob Duffy; ~~Kyle Jamieson~~; Adam Milne; Daryl Mitchell; James Neesham; Glenn Phillips; Rachin Ravindra; Ben Sears; Tim Seifert; Ish Sodhi; Tim Southee	Najmul Hossain Shanto (c); Mehidy Hasan Miraz (vc); Liton Das (wk); Anamul Haque (wk); Rakibul Hasan; Tanzid Hasan; Tanzim Hasan Sakib; Afif Hossain; Rishad Hossain; Towhid Hridoy; Shoriful Islam; Hasan Mahmud; Mushfiqur Rahim (wk); Mustafizur Rahman; Soumya Sarkar	Najmul Hossain Shanto (c); Mehidy Hasan Miraz (vc); Liton Das (wk); Mahedi Hasan; Tanzim Hasan Sakib; Afif Hossain; Rishad Hossain; Shamim Hossain; Towhid Hridoy; Shoriful Islam; Tanvir Islam; Hasan Mahmud; Mustafizur Rahman; Soumya Sarkar; Rony Talukdar (wk)

Ish Sodhi was only named for the first ODI, while Adithya Ashok was named for the last two ODIs in the New Zealand's squad. On 15 December 2023, Ben Sears was added to New Zealand's ODI squad as cover for Kyle Jamieson. However, on 18 December 2023, Jamieson was ruled out of the ODI series due to an injury. On 22 December 2023, Kane Williamson and Kyle Jamieson was withdrawn from the New Zealand's T20I squad, and replaced by Rachin Ravindra and Jacob Duffy. Mitchell Santner was named as the New Zealand's T20I captain in Williamson's absence.

== Tour match ==
14 December 2023
11:00
Scorecard

Bangladesh; 334 (49.5 overs)	v	New Zealand XI; 308 (49.2 overs)
Rishad Hossain 87 (54); Samrath Singh 4/73 (10 overs)		Bharat Popli 92 (90); Rishad Hossain 3/52 (7.2 overs)

Bangladesh won by 26 runs
Bert Sutcliffe Oval, Lincoln
Umpires: Chris Brown (NZ) and Shaun Haig (NZ)

- Toss uncontested, Bangladesh batted first.

== ODI series ==
=== 1st ODI ===
17 December 2023
11:00
Scorecard

New Zealand; 239/7 (30 overs)	v	Bangladesh; 200/9 (30 overs)
Will Young 105 (84); Shoriful Islam 2/28 (6 overs)		Anamul Haque 43 (39); Josh Clarkson 2/24 (4 overs)

New Zealand won by 44 runs (DLS method)
University of Otago Oval, Dunedin
Umpires: Chris Brown (NZ) and Rod Tucker (Aus)
Player of the match: Will Young (NZ)

- Bangladesh won the toss and elected to field.
- The match was reduced to 30 overs per side due to rain.
- Josh Clarkson and William O'Rourke (NZ) both made their ODI debuts.
- Bangladesh were set a revised target of 245 runs from 30 overs due to rain.
- Tom Latham (NZ) scored his 4,000th run in ODIs.

=== 2nd ODI ===
20 December 2023
11:00
Scorecard

Bangladesh; 291 (49.5 overs)	v	New Zealand; 296/3 (46.2 overs)
Soumya Sarkar 169 (151); William O'Rourke 3/47 (9.5 overs)		Henry Nicholls 95 (99); Hasan Mahmud 2/57 (7 overs)

New Zealand won by 7 wickets
Saxton Oval, Nelson
Umpires: Shaun Haig (NZ) and Alex Wharf (Eng)
Player of the match: Soumya Sarkar (Ban)

- New Zealand won the toss and elected to field.
- Adithya Ashok (NZ) and Rishad Hossain (Ban) both made their ODI debuts.
- This was Bangladesh's highest total in ODIs against New Zealand in New Zealand.
- Soumya Sarkar recorded the highest individual score by an Asian batter in New Zealand in ODIs.
- Soumya Sarkar also recorded the highest individual score by a Bangladeshi batter away from home in ODIs.
- Henry Nicholls (NZ) scored his 2,000th run in ODIs.

=== 3rd ODI ===
23 December 2023
11:00
Scorecard

New Zealand; 98 (31.4 overs)	v	Bangladesh; 99/1 (15.1 overs)
Will Young 26 (43); Tanzim Hasan Sakib 3/14 (7 overs)		Najmul Hossain Shanto 51* (42); William O'Rourke 1/33 (4 overs)

Bangladesh won by 9 wickets
McLean Park, Napier
Umpires: Chris Brown (NZ) and Rod Tucker (Aus)
Player of the match: Tanzim Hasan Sakib (Ban)

- Bangladesh won the toss and elected to field.
- Shoriful Islam (Ban) became the third fastest bowler for Bangladesh, in terms of matches (32), to take 50 wickets in ODIs.
- This was New Zealand's lowest total in ODIs against Bangladesh, and overall the third-lowest total by any team in ODIs against Bangladesh.
- This was Bangladesh's first win in an ODI against New Zealand in New Zealand.

== T20I series ==
=== 1st T20I ===
27 December 2023
19:10 (N)
Scorecard

New Zealand; 134/9 (20 overs)	v	Bangladesh; 137/5 (18.4 overs)
James Neesham 48 (29); Shoriful Islam 3/26 (4 overs)		Litton Das 42* (36); James Neesham 1/7 (1 over)

Bangladesh won by 5 wickets
McLean Park, Napier
Umpires: Shaun Haig (NZ) and Wayne Knights (NZ)
Player of the match: Mahedi Hasan (Ban)

- Bangladesh won the toss and elected to field.
- Tanzim Hasan Sakib (Ban) made his T20I debut.
- Najmul Hossain Shanto captained Bangladesh for the first time in T20Is.
- This was Bangladesh's first win in a T20I against New Zealand in New Zealand.

=== 2nd T20I ===
29 December 2023
19:10 (N)
Scorecard

New Zealand; 72/2 (11 overs)	v	Bangladesh
Tim Seifert 43 (23); Tanzim Hasan Sakib 1/15 (2 overs)

No result
Bay Oval, Mount Maunganui
Umpires: Kim Cotton (NZ) and Shaun Haig (NZ)

- Bangladesh won the toss and elected to field.
- Rain during New Zealand's innings prevented any further play.

=== 3rd T20I ===
31 December 2023
13:00
Scorecard

Bangladesh; 110 (19.2 overs)	v	New Zealand; 95/5 (14.4 overs)
Najmul Hossain Shanto 17 (15); Mitchell Santner 4/16 (4 overs)		Finn Allen 38 (31); Shoriful Islam 2/17 (3.4 overs)

New Zealand won by 17 runs (DLS method)
Bay Oval, Mount Maunganui
Umpires: Chris Brown (NZ) and Wayne Knights (NZ)
Player of the match: Mitchell Santner (NZ)

- New Zealand won the toss and elected to field.
- No further play was possible due to rain.
- Adam Milne (NZ) took his 50th wicket in T20Is.
- Tim Seifert (NZ) has effected most number of dismissals for New Zealand in T20Is (35 dismissals).
