= Callum Stow =

Australian cricketer (born 2002)

Personal information
- Born: 27 August 2002 (age 24)
- Batting: Right-handed
- Bowling: Left-arm wrist spin
- Role: Bowler

Domestic team information
- Years: Team
- 2024/25–2025/26: Victoria
- 2024/25–present: Melbourne Renegades
- 2026: San Francisco Unicorns

Career statistics
Competition	List A	T20
Matches	2	17
Runs scored	5	12
Batting average	5.00	4.00
100s/50s	0/0	0/0
Top score	4	7*
Balls bowled	102	357
Wickets	2	22
Bowling average	72.50	18.13
5 wickets in innings	0	0
10 wickets in match	0	0
Best bowling	1/61	4/17
Catches/stumpings	1/–	4/–
- Source: ESPNcricinfo, 16 September 2026

Callum Stow (born 27 August 2002) is an Australian cricketer who plays for Victoria cricket team and Big Bash League side Melbourne Renegades. He is a left-arm wrist spin bowler and right-handed batsman.

== Career ==
From Geelong, he plays club cricket for Geelong Cricket Club. He was selected for the elite Cricket Victoria program in July 2024. He made his debut for Victoria cricket team in the 2024 Global Super League against Guyana Amazon Warriors on 29 November 2024.

In December 2024, he was signed by Big Bash League side Melbourne Renegades. He made his Big Bash debut on 14 January 2025 against Hobart Hurricanes.

Stow was delisted from Victoria's contract list for the 2026-27 season, however was asked to continue training with the squad in the hope of further playing opportunities.

Stow played for San Francisco Unicorns in the 2026 season of the Global Super League.
