= Vitel Lawes =

West Indian cricketer

Personal information
- Full name: Vitel Orlando Lawes
- Born: 3 March 2007 (age 19); Linstead, St. Catherine, Jamaica
- Batting: Left-handed
- Bowling: Left arm wrist spin
- Role: Bowler

International information
- National side: West Indies (2026)
- ODI debut (cap 230): 11 July 2026 v New Zealand
- Last ODI: 21 July 2026 v New Zealand

Domestic team information
- Years: Team
- 2026: Jamaica Kingsmen
- 2026: Desert Vipers (Note: He replaces Daryl Mitchell in the 2026 Global Super League who pulled out of the tournament due to an injury.)

Career statistics
Competition	ODI	List A	T20
Matches	7	7	18
Runs scored	2	2	9
Batting average	1.00	1.00	-
100s/50s	0/0	0/0	-
Top score	1*	1*	8*
Balls bowled	258	258	114
Wickets	8	8	15
Bowling average	44.37	44.5l37	35.06
5 wickets in innings	-	–	–
10 wickets in match	–	–	–
Best bowling	3/39	3/39	3/29
Catches/stumpings	-	–	-
- Source: Cricinfo, 7 August 2026

Vitel Orlando Lawes (born 3 March 2007) is a West Indian cricketer who plays for the West Indies cricket team. He made his One Day International (ODI) debut against New Zealand in July 2026 becoming the second West Indian to make their international cricket debut for the West Indies at 19 years old after Jayden Seales who made his international cricket debut at 19 against South Africa . He was also part of the West Indies squad that participated in the 2026 Under-19 Men's Cricket World Cup.
