= Tourism in Guyana =

Tourism in Guyana is a fledgling industry compared to other countries in the Caribbean. Tourism is mainly focused on ecotourism, and accommodations for business travelers. Guyana is home to Kaieteur Falls, Mount Roraima, and St. George's Cathedral.

In 2020, 18 businesses and 12 tour guides were licensed with the Guyana Tourism Authority (GTA).

== International tourism ==
Mark Ellwood, contributing editor for Conde Nast Traveler, has suggested thinking of Guyana "as a bonus Caribbean country" in terms of its cultural history even though it is physically part of South America.

=== Natural heritage ===
The primary draw for tourists from abroad is Guyana's Amazon rainforest, considered one of the most pristine, untouched forests in the world. Core markets are visitors from North America and the UK (also home to a large Guyanese diaspora) and some interest from markets like Germany and the Netherlands. Guyana is South America's only English-speaking country. The GTA benchmarks its practices against the Green Destinations Standard, a Global Sustainable Tourism Council-recognized set of objective criteria for "measuring, monitoring and improving the sustainability policy in light of the growing interest in sustainable tourism". Sustainable tourism is a key factor in hinterland development, offering economic diversity to the area, through Amerindian villages, such as lodges at Rewa and Surama, and the Iwokrama International Centre for Rain Forest Conservation and Development. Tourism is seen as a way to provide employment in these remote communities, combatting the high migration rate out of these villages.

Eco-tourism activities include birdwatching and catch and release fishing.

Among many sites, Guyana is the home to Kaeitur Falls, the highest one drop waterfall in the world.

=== Sector growth ===
The oil industry, and its potential wealth boom, has encouraged development in the tourism industry, such as the building of a second Marriott Hotel slated for completion in 2023. COVID-19 severely damaged the economies of the tourism-dependent Caribbean countries, but Guyana, like Trinidad and Tobago, continues to grow due to oil production.

In 2018, tourism made up 0.58 percent of Guyana's GDP (world average: 7.87).

Number of arrivals
1996	1998	2000	2002	2004	2006	2008	2010	2012	2014	2016	2018
92,000	66,000	105,000	104,000	122,000	113,000	130,000	152,000	177,000	206,000	235,000	287,000

== Challenges ==
After independence, Guyana's national policies were focused on self-reliance; President Forbes Burnham called the tourism industry "parasitic" and detrimental to social development, in contrast to its Caribbean neighbors.

Infrastructure woes and perception of Guyana as a dangerous location damage tourism to and within the country. Recent focus has on improving safety standards, the visitor experience and enabling all tourism businesses to become licensed.

== Domestic tourism ==
Because of the diversity of Guyana, cultural events are an important source of tourism in the country. Guyana Restaurant Week started in 2014 to attract new customers with reasonably-priced set menus.

== Organisations ==
- Guyana Tourism Authority
- National Trust
- Tourism and Hospitality Association of Guyana
- The Carnegie School of Home Economics - Trade school with hospitality training

== See also ==
- Culture of Guyana
- List of airports in Guyana
- Visa policy of Guyana
