= Guyana Amazon Warriors =

Cricket club in Guyana

- Official logo of the Guyana Amazon Warriors

Personnel
- Captain: Imran Tahir
- Coach: Prasanna Agoram (GSL); Lance Klusener (CPL)

Team information
- Colours: Red; Black; Gold; White; Green
- Founded: 2013; 13 years ago
- Home ground: Providence Stadium
- Capacity: 20,000

History
- Caribbean Premier League wins: 1 (2023)
- The 6ixty wins: 0
- Global Super League wins: 2 (2025) (2026)
- Official website: Guyana Amazon Warriors Guyana CPL
T20I kit

The Guyana Amazon Warriors is a cricket team of the Caribbean Premier League based in Providence, Georgetown, Guyana. It represents Guyana in the league and was established in 2013 for the inaugural season.

The team plays home games at Providence Stadium in Guyana. They recruit players mainly from West Indian domestic teams. They have reached eight CPL finals and won their first tournament in 2023. They are owned by New GPC Inc.

== History ==
The Guyana Amazon Warriors were among the six teams established for the inaugural season of the Caribbean Premier League in 2013. In that same year, they finished as runners-up in the tournament, losing to the Jamaica Tallawahs by 7 wickets at Queen’s Park Oval in Port of Spain, Trinidad. The team, led by Ramnaresh Sarwan, featured notable international players like Tillakaratne Dilshan, James Franklin, Lasith Malinga, and West Indian stars Sunil Narine, Lendl Simmons, and Denesh Ramdin. Krishmar Santokie emerged as the highest wicket-taker of the season.

In the 2014 Caribbean Premier League, the Amazon Warriors finished second in the group stage and were then defeated by the Barbados Tridents by 8 runs (D/L) in the final at Warner Park, Basseterre, St Kitts. Captained by Sunil Narine, the team included players like Martin Guptill, Mohammad Hafeez, Jimmy Neesham, Krishmar Santokie, Lendl Simmons, and Denesh Ramdin. Simmons was named player of the series with 445 runs that season..

In the 2015 Caribbean Premier League, they again finished second in the group stage behind Barbados Tridents. However, they lost to Trinbago Knight Riders in the semi-final by 6 wickets at Queen’s Park Oval in Port of Spain, Trinidad. The team, captained by Denesh Ramdin, had a star-studded lineup that included players like Lasith Malinga, Thisara Perera, Tillakaratne Dilshan, Brad Hodge, Marchant de Lange, David Wiese, Umar Akmal, Shivnarine Chanderpaul, Veerasammy Permaul, Lendl Simmons, and Sunil Narine.

In the 2016 Caribbean Premier League, Martin Guptill took over as captain, replacing Denesh Ramdin. The team also added international players Sohail Tanvir, Dwayne Smith, Chris Lynn, Adam Zampa, as well as local stars Chris Barnwell, Jason Mohammed, and Rayad Emrit.

Imran Tahir led the Guyana Amazon Warriors to their first championship title in the 2023 Caribbean Premier League, with Romario Shepherd as Vice-Captain and Lance Klusener as head coach. This victory came after being runner ups five times, defeating the Trinbago Knight Riders at the Providence Stadium in Guyana.

== Current squad ==
- Players with international caps are listed in **bold**.

As of 14 August 2025

No.	Name	Nationality	Birth date	Batting style	Bowling style	Year signed	Notes
Batsmen
—N/a	**Kevlon Anderson**	Guyana	28 September 2000 (age 25)	Right-handed	Right-arm fast-medium	2025	
—N/a	**Shamarh Brooks**	Barbados	1 December 1988 (age 37)	Right-handed	Right-arm legbreak	2025	
—N/a	**Shimron Hetmyer**	Guyana	26 December 1996 (age 29)	Left-handed		2016	
—N/a	**Ben McDermott**	Australia	12 December 1994 (age 31)	Right-handed	Right-arm medium	2025	Overseas, Replacement player
All-rounders
—N/a	**Moeen Ali**	England	18 June 1987 (age 39)	Left-handed	Right-arm off-break	2024	Overseas
—N/a	Riyad Latif	Guyana	(age 17)	Right-handed	Right-arm legbreak	2025	
—N/a	**Keemo Paul**	Guyana	21 February 1998 (age 28)	Right-handed	Right-arm medium-fast	2022	
—N/a	**Glenn Phillips**	New Zealand	6 December 1996 (age 29)	Right-handed	Right-arm off break	2025	Overseas, Ruled out through injury
—N/a	**Dwaine Pretorius**	South Africa	29 March 1989 (age 37)	Right-handed	Right-arm medium-fast	2023	Overseas
—N/a	Quentin Sampson	Guyana	4 August 2000 (age 26)	Right-handed	Right-arm medium-fast	2025	
Wicket-keepers
—N/a	**Shai Hope**	Barbados	10 November 1993 (age 32)	Right-handed	Left-arm medium	2022	
—N/a	Kemol Savory	Guyana	27 September 1996 (age 29)			2025	
Spin bowlers
—N/a	Hassan Khan	United States	16 October 1998 (age 27)	Right-handed	Left-arm orthodox	2025	Overseas
—N/a	**Gudakesh Motie**	Guyana	29 March 1995 (age 31)	Left-handed	Left-arm orthodox	2021	
—N/a	**Imran Tahir**	South Africa	27 March 1979 (age 47)	Right-handed	Right-arm legbreak	2018	Captain, Overseas
Pace bowlers
—N/a	**Jediah Blades**	Barbados	15 April 2002 (age 24)	Right-handed	Left-arm fast-medium	2025	
—N/a	**Shamar Joseph**	Guyana	31 August 1999 (age 27)	Left-handed	Right-arm fast	2023	
—N/a	**Romario Shepherd**	Guyana	26 November 1994 (age 31)	Right-handed	Right-arm fast-medium	2018	Vice-Captain

- Source: Guyana Amazon Warriors Players

== Results summary ==
As of 15 September 2025

CPL summary of results
Year	Played	Wins	Losses	Tied	NR	Win %	Position
2013	9	6	3	0	0	66.67%	2/6
2014	11	7	4	0	0	63.63%	2/6
2015	11	5	5	0	1	50%	3/6
2016	12	8	4	0	0	66.67%	2/6
2017	12	6	6	0	0	50%	3/6
2018	12	7	5	0	0	58.33%	2/6
2019	12	11	1	0	0	91.67%	2/6
2020	11	6	5	0	0	54.54%	3/6
2021	11	6	5	0	0	54.54%	4/6
2022	12	5	6	0	1	45.45%	2/6
2023	13	10	2	0	1	83.33%	1/6
2024	13	8	5	0	0	61.53%	1/6
2025	12	7	5	0	0	58.33%	2/6
Total	151	95	56	0	3	62.91%	

- Source: ESPNcricinfo
- Abandoned matches are counted as NR (no result)
- Win or loss by super over or boundary count are counted as tied.
- Tied+Win - Counted as a win and Tied+Loss - Counted as a loss
- NR indicates no result

== Administration and support staff ==
Position	Name
Head coach	Prasanna Agoram

== Statistics ==
As of 15 September 2025

=== Most runs ===
Player	Seasons	Runs
Shimron Hetmyer	2016–present	2,261
Shai Hope	2022-present	1,571
Lendl Simmons	2013–2015	1,029
Chanderpaul Hemraj	2019–2023	863
Martin Guptill	2013–2017	862
Source: ESPNcricinfo

=== Most wickets ===
Player	Seasons	Wickets
Imran Tahir	2018–present	125
Romario Shepherd	2018–present	78
Gudakesh Motie	2021–present	60
Sohail Tanvir	2016–2018	49
Dwaine Pretorius	2023–present	49
Keemo Paul	2017–present	41
Source: ESPNcricinfo

== Seasons ==
Following the new team Antigua & Barbuda Falcons 5th place finish in their inaugural (2024) season. The Amazon Warriors retain the distinction of being the only team to never be eliminated in the league stage.

=== Caribbean Premier League ===
Year	League standing	Final standing
2013	1st out of 6	Runners-up
2014	2nd out of 6	Runners-up
2015	2nd out of 6	Play-offs
2016	1st out of 6	Runners-up
2017	4th out of 6	Qualifier
2018	2nd out of 6	Runners-up
2019	1st out of 6	Runners-up
2020	2nd out of 6	Semi-finalists
2021	2nd out of 6	Semi-finalists
2022	2nd out of 6	Qualifier
2023	1st out of 6	Champion
2024	1st out of 6	Runners-up
2025	2nd out of 6	Runners-up

=== The 6ixty ===
Season	League standing	Final position
2022	6th out of 6	League stage

=== Global Super League ===
Year	League standing	Final standing
2024	3rd out of 5	Group Stage
2025	2nd out of 5	Champions
2026	1st out of 5	Champions

== See also ==
- Guyana Amazon Warriors (WCPL)
