= Soumya Sarkar =

Bangladeshi cricketer (born 1993)

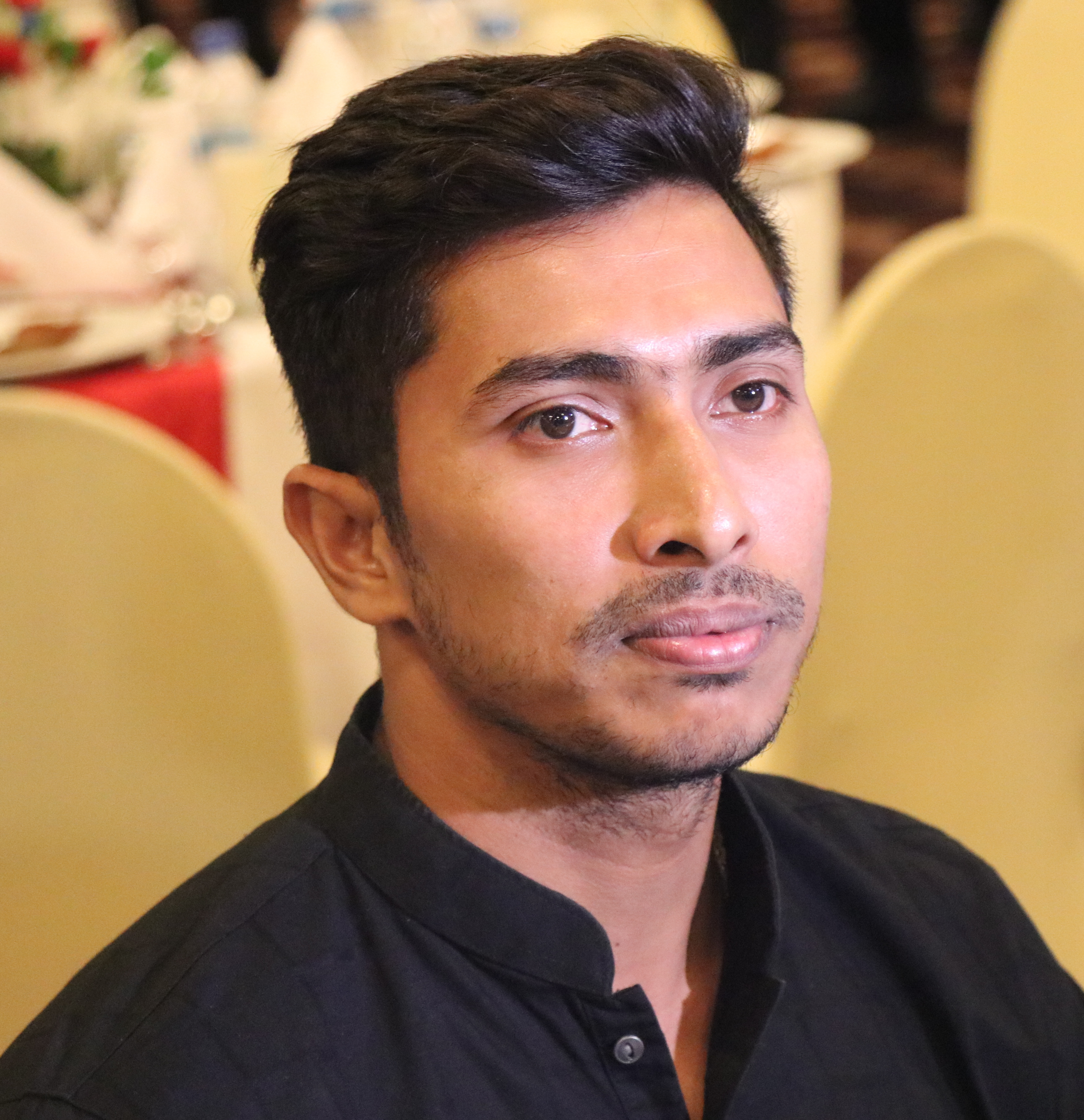
- Soumya in 2018

Personal information
- Born: 25 February 1993 (age 33); Satkhira, Bangladesh
- Height: 5 ft 10 in (1.78 m)
- Batting: Left-handed
- Bowling: Right-arm medium-fast
- Role: Batting All-Rounder

International information
- National side: Bangladesh (2014–present)
- Test debut (cap 76): 28 April 2015 v Pakistan
- Last Test: 11 February 2021 v West Indies
- ODI debut (cap 115): 1 December 2014 v Zimbabwe
- Last ODI: 14 June 2026 v Australia
- ODI shirt no.: 59 (previously 11)
- T20I debut (cap 45): 24 April 2015 v Pakistan
- Last T20I: 19 June 2026 v Australia
- T20I shirt no.: 59

Domestic team information
- Years: Team
- 2015–2018: South Zone
- 2012: Duronto Rajshahi
- 2013: Dhaka Gladiators
- 2015–2016 & 2025: Rangpur Riders
- 2017: Chittagong Vikings
- 2018: Kandahar Knights
- 2019: Rajshahi Kings
- 2019-2020: Cumilla Warriors
- 2020: Central Zone
- 2024: Fortune Barishal

Career statistics
Competition	Test	ODI	T20I	FC
Matches	16	86	89	98
Runs scored	831	2,488	1,494	5,456
Batting average	27.70	32.31	17.78	33.67
100s/50s	1/4	3/15	0/5	6/35
Top score	149	169	68	186
Balls bowled	508	612	288	4,552
Wickets	4	17	12	72
Bowling average	84.00	36.47	37.58	34.79
5 wickets in innings	0	0	0	2
10 wickets in match	0	0	0	–
Best bowling	2/68	3/18	2/19	5/34
Catches/stumpings	23/–	45/–	47/–	74/–
Medal record
Men's Cricket
Representing Bangladesh
ACC Asia Cup
Runner-up	2016 Bangladesh
Runner-up	2018 UAE
South Asian Games
Gold medal – first place	2019 Kathmandu	Team
- Source: ESPN Cricinfo, 27 July 2026

Soumya Sarkar (Bengali: সৌম্য সরকার; born 25 February 1993) is a Bangladeshi cricketer. He is a left-handed batter and a right arm medium-fast bowler who mainly plays as an opening batter. He is the only batter to hit 2 sixes in the first over in a T20 World Cup match and the second highest individual run-scorer for Bangladesh in an ODI innings. He is the inventor of the stylish-looking "Periscope" shot. Sarkar plays for the Rangpur Riders in the Bangladesh Premier League, Khulna Division in the National Cricket League, and Prime Bank Cricket Club in the Dhaka Premier Division.

== Personal life ==
Sarkar was born in Satkhira, Khulna, to a Bengali Hindu family. He was named Soumya Shanto but later dropped "Shanto" from his name. On 27 February 2020, Sarkar married his girlfriend Priyonti Debnath Puja. The marriage ceremony was held at Khulna Club. His wife is the daughter of Gopal Debnath of the village of Tutpara in Khulna.

== Domestic career ==
Sarkar is a top-order batter, who was a part of the 2010 and 2012 Under-19 World Cup teams. In the 2012 Under-19 World Cup, Sarkar came into the spotlight after 'mankading' Australia's Jimmy Peirson. He made his first-class debut for Khulna Division against Dhaka Division in the 2010–11 season.

In April 2019, in the final round of matches in the 2018–19 Dhaka Premier Division Cricket League, Sarkar scored 208 not out batting for Abahani Limited against Sheikh Jamal Dhanmondi Club. It was the highest individual total in List A cricket in Bangladesh, and the first double century in List A cricket by a Bangladeshi batsman. Sarkar's innings also contained 16 sixes, also a record for a List A innings in Bangladesh. His record breaking innings propelled Abahani Limited to their 20th Dhaka Premier League title.

=== Bangladesh Premier League ===
In October 2018, Sarkar was named in the squad for the Rajshahi Kings team, following the draft for the 2018–19 Bangladesh Premier League.

In November 2019, Sarkar was selected to play for the Cumilla Warriors in the 2019–20 Bangladesh Premier League. On 28 December 2019, he scored 88* against Rajshahi Royals in the 2019–20 BPL, which was his highest individual score in T20 and his first fifty plus score in last four years in T20. He had a successful journey in the BPL having scored 331 runs and picking up 12 wickets in 12 matches.

Sarkar played for Gazi Group Chattogram In 2020-21 Bangabandhu T20 Cup.

In January 2024, he was named in the Fortune Barishal's squad, following the players draft for 2024 Bangladesh Premier League.

== International career ==
=== 2013–2014 ===
In November 2013, Sarkar was included in Bangladesh's T20 squad for a one-off game against New Zealand, but did not find a place in the final XI. Sarkar was included in the squad for Bangladesh's home series against Zimbabwe in 2014 and finally, he made his One Day International debut for Bangladesh against Zimbabwe on 1 December 2014.

=== 2015–2019 ===
Sarkar represented Bangladesh in the 2015 Cricket World Cup. He holds the record along with Mohammad Kaif and Umar Akmal for taking the most catches in a single World Cup match (4). Sarkar made his Twenty20 International debut for Bangladesh against Pakistan in April 2015. On 22 April 2015, Sarkar hit his maiden ODI hundred and added 145 with Tamim Iqbal. He made his Test debut against Pakistan in April 2015.

Sarkar also played in Bangladesh's 100th Test match, where they defeated Sri Lanka on their home soil. He played a key role in that historic Test match, scoring 61 in the first innings and taking five catches, the most by any player for Bangladesh in a single Test match. Sarkar also set the record for taking the most catches for Bangladeshi in a Test innings (4).

In 2019, Sarkar scored his maiden Test century against New Zealand at Seddon Park equaling Tamim Iqbal's record who also scored a century in 94 balls against England at Lord's in 2010. In April 2019, he was named in Bangladesh's squad for the 2019 Cricket World Cup. On 24 June 2019, in the match against Afghanistan, Soumya played in his 50th ODI.

In November 2019, Sarkar was named in Bangladesh's squad for the 2019 ACC Emerging Teams Asia Cup in Bangladesh. He was adjudged player of the tournament. Later the same month, he was named in Bangladesh's squad for the cricket tournament at the 2019 South Asian Games. Bangladesh cricket team won the gold medal, after they beat Sri Lanka by seven wickets in the final.

=== 2020-Present ===
In February–March 2020, Sarkar did not feature in the Test and ODI series when Zimbabwe toured Bangladesh due to his marriage. But he was included in the two-match T20I series. In the first T20I, he scored 62 off 32 balls, his highest individual score in T20I (as of 22 May 2021), helping Bangladesh to win the match by 48 runs.

He was named in the T20I squad played against Zimbabwe in July 2021. In the first T20I, he scored his 1000th T20I runs, becoming only fifth Bangladeshi batsman to score 1000 T20I runs and scoring 50 runs off 45 helped Bangladesh for a comprehensive eight-wicket victory. Though he failed with bat in the second match, but in the third match he took two wickets conceding 19 runs in 3 overs and scored his career-best 68 off 49 balls, helping Bangladesh to chase a mammoth target of 193 and winning the series by 2–1 margin. He became the Player of the series for his all-round performance, scoring 126 runs at an average of 42 and picking up 3 wickets.

In September 2021, he was named in Bangladesh's squad for the 2021 ICC Men's T20 World Cup. He was also selected to play in the 2022 ICC Men's T20 World Cup.

In December 2023, he was named in Bangladesh's squad for the white-ball tour to New Zealand. During the second ODI, he scored 169 runs, the highest individual score by a Bangladeshi batter away from home in ODIs. With this, he also recorded the highest individual score by an Asian batter in New Zealand in ODIs.

On 15 April 2024, during the second ODI against Sri Lanka, he became the fastest Bangladeshi batter to score 2,000 runs, in ODIs, in terms of innings (64).

In May 2024, he was named in Bangladesh's squad for the 2024 ICC Men's T20 World Cup tournament.

== Global Super League 2024 ==
In November 2024, Sarkar was named in Rangpur Riders squad for the inaugural Global Super League tournament. Rangpur Riders beat Victoria in the final by 56 runs, becoming the first Champion of GSL. In the final against Victoria, he scored unbeaten 86 which is the tournament's highest individual score. For this, he won the Player Of The Match award. He was also the highest scorer of the tournament with 188 runs.

== Key ==
- * – Remained not out
- ‡ – Captain of Bangladesh in that match
- † – Man of the match

== International centuries ==
Test centuries by Soumya Sarkar
No.	Runs	Against	Venue	H/A	Date	Result	Ref
1	149	New Zealand	Seddon Park, Hamilton	Away	28 February 2019	Lost	

One Day International centuries by Soumya Sarkar
No.	Runs	Against	Venue	H/A	Date	Result	Ref
1	127* †	Pakistan	Sher-e-Bangla National Cricket Stadium, Dhaka	Home	22 April 2015	Won	
2	117 †	Zimbabwe	Zohur Ahmed Chowdhury Stadium, Chittagong	Home	26 October 2018	Won	
3	169 †	New Zealand	Saxton Oval, Nelson	Away	20 December 2023	Lost	
