= Prasanna Agoram =

Indian cricket data analyst, cricket performance analyst, video analyst, statistician

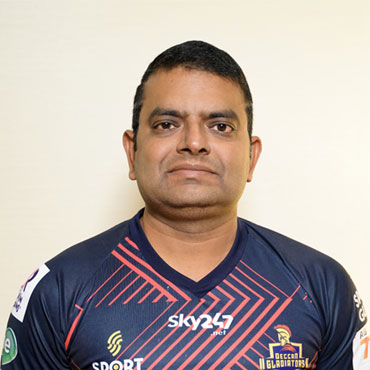
- As Performance Analyst at Deccan Gladiators
- Born: Chennai, Tamil Nadu, India
- Education: Adhiyamaan College of Engineering (B.E.)
- Occupation: Performance Analyst
- Years active: 2010-present

Prasanna Agoram, also known as Pdogg, is an Indian cricket data analyst, coach, cricket performance analyst, video analyst, YouTuber, commentator. He served as the Technical Strategy Analyst of South Africa national cricket team for over a decade.

He is a Level 3 certified coach from CSA (Cricket South Africa), qualified umpire from BCCI having diverse experiences of 11 years as performance coach with Proteas (South Africa national cricket team), 11 years as performance coach in Indian Premier League and 2 years as Performance analyst with Indian hockey. He is currently working as high-performance manager with Gauteng province of Cricket South Africa.

== Career ==
He obtained an engineering degree with a gold medal in Electronics and Telecommunication Engineering from Adhiyamaan College of Engineering, Hosur. He also played under-19 cricket for Tamil Nadu at state level for a short tenure.

After a brief stint in umpiring, he plied his trade in pursuing a career on data analytics. He began his analytics career focusing on the statistical analysis of cricket in 2001, at a time when there were only a handful of cricket analysts available as the data analytics, data statistics in cricket had been at its infancy stage. Cricket data analytics were not taken seriously into consideration by players and commentators, (owing to slow technological adaptation by the sport itself) during the time when Agoram entered into the cricketing fraternity as a data analyst. He began building his own cricket data driven software database to research on the matchups and head-to-head record between a selected list of batters against a selected list of bowlers. As a statistical analyst, he also began compiling video footage of cricketers featured at several international matches to analyse the shortcomings of players and to analyse the strengths of players in order to pitch suggestions to such crop of players as key areas for improvements.

Agoram made trials to incorporate his thought process of pitching performance analysis using his own software database system with the corporate teams which played mercantile cricket tournaments during the weekends in his locality where he resides. He even insisted about putting up video cameras close to the sight screen in order to disseminate reports to the corporate teams about the progress of players and how the players made technical adjustments during the course of the matches. He illustrated his software analysis at the National Cricket Academy which was established in Bangalore, where he exclusively began working on a part time basis for a stint of two years from 2002 to 2004. He was later elevated to the position of Technical Head at the National Cricket Academy in 2004 as a full-time job role. He also collaborated with former Indian cricketer Venkatesh Prasad to guide the Indian under-19 national cricket team in 2005 and he worked as the performance video analyst with the side until the end of the 2006 ICC U19 Cricket World Cup.

Agoram was appointed as the performance analyst of the Royal Challengers Banglore outfit for the inaugural edition of the Indian Premier League in 2008. He began implementing strategies using SWOT analysis for the players during his stint with the Royal Challengers Bangalore side, at a time when T20 was a relatively new format and IPL was introduced as a franchise tournament with the advent of a different model system being brought into the sport which was previously non-existent. South African players Dale Steyn, Jacques Kallis, Mark Boucher who were also part of the Royal Challengers Bangalore side during the 2008 IPL season, recommended Cricket South Africa to consider Agoram as the viable candidate for the job role of performance analyst of the South African men's national cricket team after being impressed with his work. Cricket South Africa accepted the recommendation and appointed Agoram as the performance analyst of the national cricket team in 2010 and he worked closely with the South African cricket players until 2021. His first major assignment with South African cricket after taking up the job of performance analyst was the 2011 Cricket World Cup where South Africa faced an heartbreak in the quarter-final defeat to New Zealand. During his stint, South Africa test cricket team rose to the top of the ICC Men's Test Team Rankings and South Africa remained on top of the test team rankings for a longer duration by also winning the ICC Test Championship Maces on consecutive calendar years to stamp their authority as the best test playing nation as well as the best travelling nation in test cricket for many years.

Agoram recalled memories of having worked with prominent South African cricketers including Hashim Amla and Dale Steyn whom he mentioned as the few players who cautiously approached the game with data analytics in mind coupled with the performance oriented thought process which both Amla and Steyn formulated and applied during their playing careers until their retirements. He gained popularity in the South African cricket fraternity for his technical guidance he displayed and was fondly nicknamed in South African dressing room as P-dogg. Amla, Kallis and AB de Villiers all acknowledged that Agoram played a crucial role in elevating the standards of South African cricket through his introduction of data analytics and robust technology mechanism to analyse the match situations and to act accordingly with proactive strategies. In January 2021, he announced that he had decided to part ways with South African cricket, insisting that he wanted to work on other projects which also brought an end of a 11 year long association between him and Cricket South Africa. Some reports also suggested that he was denied visa by Pakistani authorities due to his Indian nationality as he was supposed to travel with the South African test team for their tour of Pakistan in 2020–21 season. However, Agoram revealed that he made a decision to resign from his role of performance analyst with Cricket South Africa even before the tour of Pakistan had begun.

Over the years, he spent working with several cricketers and had instructed guidelines on what exactly is the length to bowl, what length has been successful in the past, where to bowl in the death overs, what field to set etc, amplifying the tactical acumen he possessed during his career as a performance analyst. He served as the analyst coach of the Rising Pune Supergiant side for the 2016 Indian Premier League season. He was appointed as the high-performance coach of the Kings XI Punjab side for the 2019 Indian Premier League. Agoram played a pivotal role in helping to elevate the West Indies speedster Shamar Joseph to rise up through the ranks by encouraging him to pursue his career in cricket. Agoram who worked as a talent scout for Guyana Amazon Warriors witnessed the skillsets of Joseph in the net training session conducted by the Guyana Amazon Warriors camp ahead of the 2023 Caribbean Premier League season, which caught his attention and P-Dogg eventually convinced then Guyana Amazon Warriors captain Imran Tahir to include Joseph in the Guyana Amazon Warriors squad for the 2023 CPL season. He also served as performance analyst of Deccan Gladiators during the 2021 Abu Dhabi T10 season.

In the present he runs his own YouTube channel Pdoggspeaks, where he regularly appears as a data analyst, providing insights on cricket and match previews & reviews for cricket matches.Also, he is a regular collaborator on Indian cricketer Ravichandran Ashwin's youtube channel where he is known for his reviews with his singing skills, encouraged by Ashwin.
