= Providence Stadium =

Cricket stadium

Coordinates: 6°45′27.96″N 58°10′40.77″W

- Guyana National Stadium
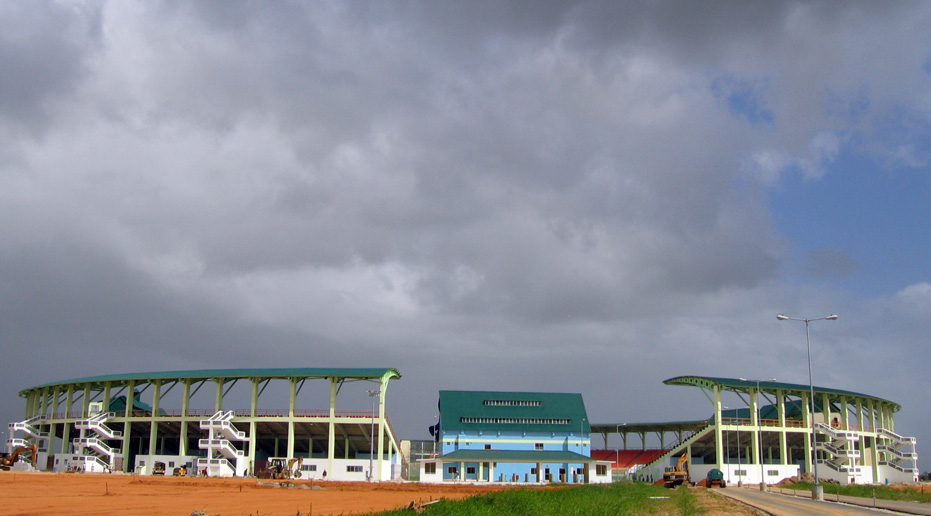
- Providence Stadium
- Interactive map of Providence Stadium

Ground information
- Location: Providence, Georgetown, Guyana
- Country: Guyana
- Establishment: 2006
- Capacity: 20,000
- Owner: Government of Guyana
- Operator: Guyana Cricket Board
- Tenants: Guyana cricket team Guyana Amazon Warriors
- End names
- Media Centre End; Pavilion End

International information
- First men's Test: 22–26 March 2008: West Indies v Sri Lanka
- Last men's Test: 15–17 August 2024: West Indies v South Africa
- First men's ODI: 28 March 2007: South Africa v Sri Lanka
- Last men's ODI: 16 July 2022: West Indies v Bangladesh
- First men's T20I: 30 April 2010: New Zealand v Sri Lanka
- Last men's T20I: 27 June 2024: India v England
- First women's T20I: 10 September 2011: West Indies v Pakistan
- Last women's T20I: 20 November 2019: West Indies v India

Team information
Guyana cricket team	(2007 – present)
Guyana Amazon Warriors	(2013 – present)
- As of 7 June 2024; Source: ESPNcricinfo

The Providence Stadium or Guyana National Stadium is a sports stadium in Guyana, replacing Bourda as the national stadium. The stadium was built specifically to host Super Eight matches in the 2007 Cricket World Cup held in March and April 2007.

The stadium hosted six World Cup matches between 28 March 2007 and 9 April 2007, most notably the match between Sri Lanka and South Africa in which Sri Lankan fast bowler Lasith Malinga became the first bowler in international cricket history to take four wickets in four consecutive balls. Built primarily for cricket matches, the stadium can be converted into a multi-use facility.

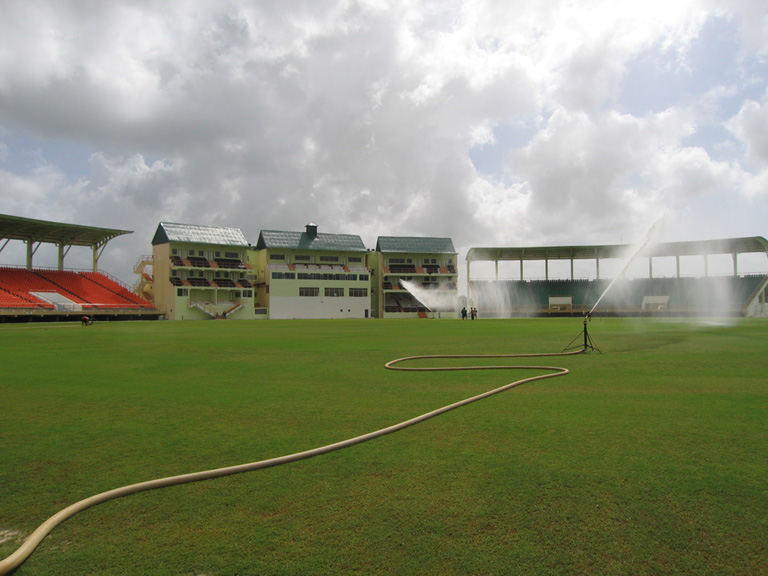
Ground level looking out over the Pitch

== History ==
Built for the 2007 ICC Cricket World Cup, the stadium hosted six One Day Internationals as part of that competition, all at the Super Eights stage. As of June 2016, it has hosted ten more ODI games since the 2007 World Cup including a historic three Day/Night matches during the 2016 Tri Series involving West Indies, Australia and South Africa. This series represents the first time that every ODI match is played under floodlights in the Caribbean.

Providence hosted its first Test Match in 2008, with Sri Lanka as the visiting team, but didn't host another Test until May 2011, when the West Indies defeated Pakistan. It was also one of the venues for the 2010 ICC World Twenty20, hosting six group stage matches, including two matches involving the West Indies.

It has also hosted other sports other than cricket including football and also hosted the rugby sevens competition at the 2010 Central American and Caribbean Games. The opening and closing ceremonies as well as the numerous super concerts held for Carifesta 10 were also hosted there. With the advent of the Caribbean Premier League the stadium became the home ground for the Guyana Amazon Warriors franchise hosting league matches in each of the first three seasons.

The stadium was built by the Government of Guyana with substantial financial assistance from the Government of India. It was conceptualised by R. K and Associates Architects Engineers Planners New Delhi, designed by C R Narayana Rao (CRN) Architects and Engineers Chennai and constructed by Shapoorji Pallonji Group. Construction, delayed by flooding, started in May 2005.

Seating 15,000 people, Providence Stadium is one of the largest sports arenas in Guyana, and now hosts test cricket instead of Bourda. The complex includes a shopping mall and luxury apartments. Princess International Hotel is located next to the stadium.

== Transport ==
Providence Stadium is located on the east bank of the Demerara River a few kilometres south of the Guyanese capital, Georgetown. Located along the East Bank Highway the stadium is a ten-minute drive from Georgetown's city centre and a 30-minute drive from Cheddi Jagan International Airport.

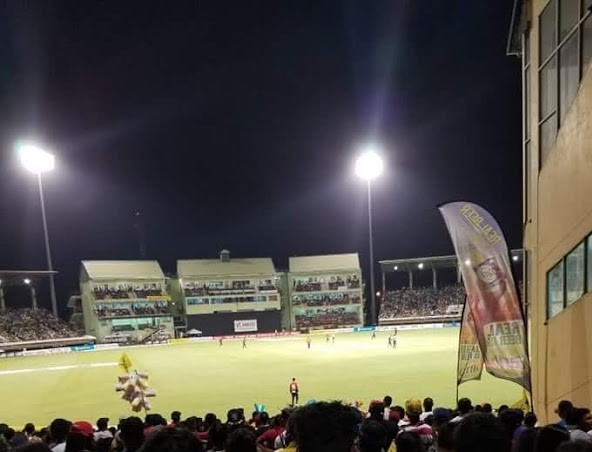
Amazon Warriors vs TKR; CPL 2018 Qualifiers

== 2007 Cricket World Cup matches ==
28 March 2007

Sri Lanka; 209 (49.3 overs)	v	South Africa; 212/9 (48.2 overs)

South Africa won by 1 wicket
Providence Stadium, Guyana

30 March 2007

England; 266/7 (50 overs)	v	Ireland; 218 (48.1 overs)

England won by 48 runs
Providence Stadium, Guyana

1 April 2007

Sri Lanka; 303/5 (50 overs)	v	West Indies; 190 (44.3 overs)

Sri Lanka won by 113 runs
Providence Stadium, Guyana

3 April 2007

Ireland; 152/8 (35 overs)	v	South Africa; 165/3 (31.3 overs)

South Africa won by 7 wickets (DLS method)
Providence Stadium, Guyana

7 April 2007

Bangladesh; 251/8 (50 overs)	v	South Africa; 184 (48.4 overs)

Bangladesh won by 67 runs
Providence Stadium, Guyana

9 April 2007

New Zealand; 263/8 (50 overs)	v	Ireland; 134 (37.4 overs)

New Zealand won by 129 runs
Providence Stadium, Guyana

== 2010 ICC World Twenty20 matches ==
30 April
13:00
Scorecard

Sri Lanka; 135/6 (20 overs)	v	New Zealand; 139/8 (19.5 overs)
Mahela Jayawardene 81 (51); Shane Bond 2/35 (4 overs)		Jesse Ryder 42 (27); Muttiah Muralitharan 2/25 (4 overs)

New Zealand won by 2 wickets
Providence Stadium, Georgetown
Umpires: Steve Davis (Aus) and Rudi Koertzen (SA)
Player of the match: Nathan McCullum (NZ)

- Sri Lanka won the toss and elected to bat.

3 May
09:30
Scorecard

Sri Lanka; 173/7 (20 overs)	v	Zimbabwe; 29/1 (5 overs)
Mahela Jayawardene 100 (64); Ray Price 2/31 (4 overs)		Tatenda Taibu 12* (13)

Sri Lanka won by 14 runs (DLS method)
Providence Stadium, Georgetown
Umpires: Billy Doctrove (WI) and Ian Gould (Eng)
Player of the match: Mahela Jayawardene (SL)

- Sri Lanka won the toss and elected to bat.

4 May
09:30
Scorecard

Zimbabwe; 84 (15.1 overs)	v	New Zealand; 36/1 (8.1 overs)
Tatenda Taibu 21 (14); Scott Styris 3/5 (2 overs)		Brendon McCullum 22* (26); Prosper Utseya 1/21 (4 overs)

New Zealand won by 7 runs (DLS method)
Providence Stadium, Georgetown
Umpires: Asad Rauf (Pak) and Steve Davis (Aus)
Player of the match: Nathan McCullum (NZ)

- New Zealand won the toss and elected to field.

30 April
17:00 (D/N)
Scorecard

West Indies; 138/9 (20 overs)	v	Ireland; 68 (16.4 overs)
Darren Sammy 30 (17); George Dockrell 3/16 (4 overs)		Gary Wilson 17 (34); Darren Sammy 3/8 (3.4 overs)

West Indies won by 70 runs
Providence Stadium, Georgetown
Umpires: Asad Rauf (Pak) and Billy Bowden (NZ)
Player of the match: Darren Sammy (WI)

- West Indies won the toss and elected to bat.

3 May
13:30
Scorecard

England; 191/5 (20 overs)	v	West Indies; 60/2 (5.5 overs)
Eoin Morgan 55 (35); Darren Sammy 2/22 (4 overs)		Chris Gayle 25 (12); Graeme Swann 2/24 (2 overs)

West Indies won by 8 wickets (DLS method)
Providence Stadium, Georgetown
Umpires: Tony Hill (NZ) and Rudi Koertzen (SA)
Player of the match: Darren Sammy (WI)

- West Indies won the toss and elected to field.

4 May
13:30
Scorecard

England; 120/8 (20 overs)	v	Ireland; 14/1 (3.3 overs)
Eoin Morgan 45 (37); Kevin O'Brien 2/22 (3 overs)		Niall O'Brien 9* (5); Ryan Sidebottom 1/9 (1.3 overs)

No result
Providence Stadium, Georgetown
Umpires: Billy Bowden (NZ) and Tony Hill (NZ)

- Ireland won the toss and elected to field.

== 2024 ICC Men's T20 World Cup matches ==
2 June 2024
10:30 UTC−4
Scorecard

Papua New Guinea; 136/8 (20 overs)	v	West Indies; 137/5 (19 overs)
Sese Bau 50 (43); Andre Russell 2/19 (3 overs)		Roston Chase 42* (27); Assad Vala 2/28 (4 overs)

West Indies won by 5 wickets
Providence Stadium, Georgetown, Guyana
Umpires: Adrian Holdstock (SA) and Rashid Riaz (Pak)
Player of the match: Roston Chase (WI)

- West Indies won the toss and elected to field.

3 June 2024
20:30 UTC−4 (N)
Scorecard

Afghanistan; 183/5 (20 overs)	v	Uganda; 58 (16 overs)
Rahmanullah Gurbaz 76 (45); Brian Masaba 2/21 (4 overs)		Robinson Obuya 14 (25); Fazalhaq Farooqi 5/9 (4 overs)

Afghanistan won by 125 runs
Providence Stadium, Georgetown, Guyana
Umpires: Kumar Dharmasena (SL) and Ahsan Raza (Pak)
Player of the match: Fazalhaq Farooqi (Afg)

- Uganda won the toss and elected to field.
- Fazalhaq Farooqi (Afg) took his maiden five-wicket haul in T20Is.

5 June 2024
19:30 UTC−4 (N)
Scorecard

Papua New Guinea; 77 (19.1 overs)	v	Uganda; 78/7 (18.2 overs)
Hiri Hiri 15 (19); Frank Nsubuga 2/4 (4 overs)		Riazat Ali Shah 33 (56); Alei Nao 2/16 (4 overs)

Uganda won by 3 wickets
Providence Stadium, Georgetown, Guyana
Umpires: Adrian Holdstock (SA) and Rashid Riaz (Pak)
Player of the match: Riazat Ali Shah (Uga)

- Uganda won the toss and elected to field.
- This was the first World Cup match victory for Uganda across all formats.

7 June 2024
19:30 UTC−4 (N)
Scorecard

Afghanistan; 159/6 (20 overs)	v	New Zealand; 75 (15.2 overs)
Rahmanullah Gurbaz 80 (56); Trent Boult 2/22 (4 overs)		Glenn Phillips 18 (18); Fazalhaq Farooqi 4/17 (3.2 overs)

Afghanistan won by 84 runs
Providence Stadium, Georgetown, Guyana
Umpires: Kumar Dharmasena (SL) and Ahsan Raza (Pak)
Player of the match: Rahmanullah Gurbaz (Afg)

- New Zealand won the toss and elected to field.
- This was Afghanistan's first win against New Zealand in T20Is.

8 June 2024
20:30 UTC−4 (N)
Scorecard

West Indies; 173/5 (20 overs)	v	Uganda; 39 (12 overs)
Johnson Charles 44 (42); Brian Masaba 2/31 (4 overs)		Juma Miyagi 13" (20); Akeal Hosein 5/11 (4 overs)

West Indies won by 134 runs
Providence Stadium, Georgetown, Guyana
Umpires: Kumar Dharmasena (SL) and Rashid Riaz (Pak)
Player of the match: Akeal Hosein (WI)

- West Indies won the toss and elected to bat.
- Akeal Hosein (WI) took his maiden five-wicket haul in T20Is.

=== Semi-final 2 ===
27 June 2024
10:30 UTC−4
Scorecard

India; 171/7 (20 overs)	v	England; 103 (16.4 overs)
Rohit Sharma 57 (39); Chris Jordan 3/37 (3 overs)		Harry Brook 25 (19); Kuldeep Yadav 3/19 (4 overs)

India won by 68 runs
Providence Stadium, Georgetown
Umpires: Chris Gaffaney (NZ) and Rod Tucker (Aus)
Player of the match: Axar Patel (Ind)

- England won the toss and elected to field.
- India qualified for the T20 World Cup final for the third time.

== Records ==
=== Tests ===
Providence Stadium has hosted two test matches against Sri Lanka and Pakistan in 2008 and 2011 respectively. The records for batting and bowling after these two matches are:

- Highest Team Score – 476/8 dec. Sri Lanka vs West Indies
- Highest Individual Score – 136 by Mahela Jayawardene
- Lowest Team Score – 152 all out West Indies vs Pakistan
- Best Bowling in an Innings – 6/42 by Saeed Ajmal Pakistan vs West Indies
- Best Bowling in a Match – 11/111 by Saeed Ajmal Pakistan vs West Indies

=== ODIs ===
There has been nineteen (19) ODIs played at the Providence Stadium since it was built. The most recent match was in April 2017 when West Indies played Pakistan in the last of three ODIs at the ground.

- Highest Team Score – 309/6 West Indies vs Pakistan
- Highest Individual Score – 130* by Tamim Iqbal Bangladesh vs West Indies
- Lowest Team Score – 98 West Indies vs Pakistan
- Most Runs – 314 (5 Innings) Shivnarine Chanderpaul
- Best Bowling in an Innings – 7/12 by Shahid Afridi Pakistan vs West Indies
- Most Wickets – 12 (4 Matches) Sunil Narine

=== T20Is ===
The ground has hosted eight (8) Twenty20 Internationals in the 2010 T20 World Cup and five (5) in the 2024 T20 World Cup.

- Highest Team Score – 191/5 England vs West Indies
- Highest Individual Score – 100 by Mahela Jayawardene Sri Lanka vs Zimbabwe
- Most Runs – 181 (2 Innings) Mahela Jayawardene
- Best Bowling in an Innings – 5/9 Fazalhaq Farooqi Afghanistan vs Uganda
- Most Wickets – 9 (2 Matches) Fazalhaq Farooqi

== List of five-wicket hauls ==
As of 17 August 2024

Providence Stadium has seen 14 international five-wicket hauls taken on the ground. Six of these have been taken in Test matches, five in ODIs, two in men's T20I and one in women's T20I.

=== Test matches ===
Five-wicket hauls in Men's Test matches at Providence Stadium
No.	Bowler	Date	Team	Opposing Team	Inn	O	R	W	Result
1	Chaminda Vaas	22 March 2008	Sri Lanka	West Indies	4	22.2	61	5	Sri Lanka won
2	Saeed Ajmal (Note: Saeed Ajmal and Sammy took their five wicket hauls during the same match. Saeed's two five-wicket hauls during the same match are the only time this has occurred on the ground.)	12 May 2011	Pakistan	West Indies	1	33	69	5	West Indies won
3	Saeed Ajmal	12 May 2011	Pakistan	West Indies	3	23.5	42	6	West Indies won
4	Darren Sammy	12 May 2011	West Indies	Pakistan	4	17	29	5	West Indies won
5	Shamar Joseph	15 August 2024	West Indies	South Africa	1	14	33	5	
6	Jayden Seales	17 August 2024	West Indies	South Africa	2	18.4	61	6	

=== One Day Internationals ===
Five-wicket hauls in Men's One Day Internationals at Providence Stadium
No.	Bowler	Date	Team	Opposing Team	Inn	O	R	W	Result
1	Charl Langeveldt	28 March 2007 (Note: This match took place during the 2007 Cricket World Cup.)	South Africa	Sri Lanka	1	10	39	5	South Africa won
2	Andre Nel	7 April 2007	South Africa	Bangladesh	1	10	45	5	Bangladesh won
3	Shahid Afridi	14 July 2013	Pakistan	West Indies	2	9	12	7	Pakistan won
4	Sunil Narine	3 June 2016	West Indies	South Africa	1	9.5	27	6	West Indies won
5	Hasan Ali	9 March 2017	Pakistan	West Indies	2	8.5	38	5	Pakistan won

=== Twenty20 Internationals ===
==== Men's Twenty20 ====
Five-wicket hauls in Men's Twenty20 Internationals at Providence Stadium
No.	Bowler	Date	Team	Opposing Team	Inn	O	W	R	Result
1	Fazalhaq Farooqi	3 June 2024	Afghanistan	Uganda	2	4	5	9	Afghanistan won
2	Akeal Hosein	8 June 2024	West Indies	Uganda	2	4	5	11	West Indies won

==== Women's Twenty20 ====
Five-wicket hauls in Women's Twenty20 Internationals at Providence Stadium
No.	Bowler	Date	Team	Opposing Team	Inn	O	R	W	Result
1	Deandra Dottin	9 November 2018 (Note: This match took place during the 2018 ICC Women's World Twenty20.)	West Indies	Bangladesh	2	3.4	5	5	West Indies won

== See also ==
- List of Test cricket grounds
- Lists of stadiums
