= Mickey Arthur =

South African coach and former cricketer

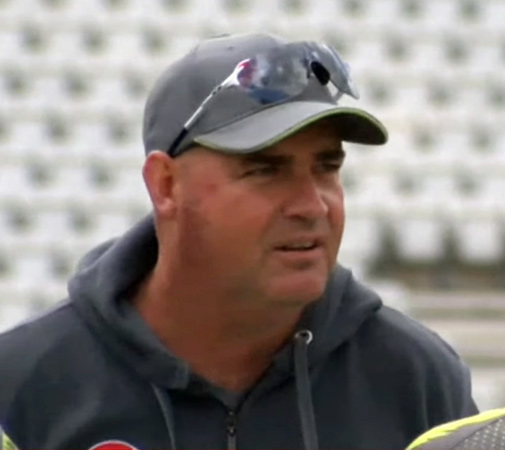
- Arthur in 2019

Personal information
- Full name: John Michael Arthur
- Born: 17 May 1968 (age 58); Johannesburg, Transvaal, South Africa
- Batting: Right-handed
- Role: Batsman

Domestic team information
- Years: Team
- 1986–2001: Griqualand West
- 1987–1990: Impalas
- 1990–1995: Orange Free State

Head coaching information
- Years: Team
- 2005–2010: South Africa
- 2010–2013: Australia
- 2016–2019: Pakistan
- 2019–2021: Sri Lanka
- 2021–: Derbyshire

Career statistics
Competition	First-class	List A
Matches	110	150
Runs scored	6,657	3,774
Batting average	33.00	26.76
100s/50s	21/89	2/19
Top score	165	126*
Balls bowled	6	355
Wickets	0	0
Bowling average	–	–
5 wickets in innings	–	–
10 wickets in match	–	–
Best bowling	–	–
Catches/stumpings	74/–	41/–
- Source: CricketArchive, 19 July 2011

John Michael Arthur (born 17 May 1968) is a South African-Australian cricket coach, commentator and former cricketer, who played in South African domestic cricket from 1986 to 2001. He has served as the head coach of the Derbyshire County Cricket Club since November 2021.

He coached the South African national team from 2005 to 2010, was the coach of the Australia national cricket team from 2010 until his sacking in June 2013 (then to be replaced by Darren Lehmann) and was the coach of the Pakistan cricket team from 2016 to 2019. During his time with Pakistan, he led the team to being the winners of the 2017 ICC Champions Trophy. In December 2019, Mickey was appointed as the new head coach of Sri Lanka by the Sri Lanka Cricket replacing interim coach Rumesh Ratnayake.

== Biography ==
Arthur was born in Johannesburg, Transvaal, South Africa. He is an old boy of Westville Boys' High School.

== Playing career ==
Arthur scored 6,557 runs playing for Orange Free State, Griqualand West and South Africa A before retiring in 2001.

== Coaching career ==
=== South Africa ===
Arthur began his coaching career by coaching Griqualand West cricket team in the domestic competition before taking over the Eastern Cape side in 2003. In his last two series in charge Arthur managed to guide them to the finals of the Standard Bank Pro20 Series. He was a surprising choice to take over as the national coach in May 2005, succeeding Ray Jennings.

He had a tough introduction into international cricket with his first two Test series as coach happening to be against a rampant Australia, both away and at home, during which South Africa were easily beaten. An injury-hit South Africa failed to make the finals of the 2005–06 VB Series, but they did clinch a tense one-day series win over Australia at home, which culminated in an iconic match at Johannesburg.

A home win over New Zealand was followed up by a disastrous tour of Sri Lanka in the summer of 2006, where South Africa lost both Tests and pulled out of a tri-series after a bomb exploded in Colombo, and failure to make the final of the ICC Champions Trophy. Successes include back-to-back Test and one-day series victories against India and Pakistan at home propelled South Africa to the top of the ODI rankings. This was a major boost prior to the 2007 Cricket World Cup.

South Africa were, however, disappointing at the world cup. They had a roller coaster ride that included dominant wins over England, the West Indies, Ireland, Netherlands and Scotland and a narrow win over Sri Lanka but devastating losses to Australia, New Zealand and Bangladesh that cost them the number one ranking. Then they bowed out in the semifinals with their lowest ever score in a World Cup as Australia bowled them out for 149 and won by 7 wickets.

The preceding two years had been the best in South Africa's test history. Starting with the two home series wins at home against Pakistan and India, Arthur lead the team through a series of 9 unbeaten test series and a number of good one-day results. This streak included wins against India, Pakistan, West Indies, New Zealand and Bangladesh at home and away wins against England, Pakistan, Bangladesh and a credible draw in India.

In 2008, Arthur became the first South African coach to guide his team to a test win in Australia. The team backed up this performance by winning the resulting One-Day International series against the odds. This unexpected 4–1 win meant that they regained the No.1 ranking in the One-Day International rankings.

During the 2005/06 tour to Australia, he questioned the umpiring standards, claiming that the officials were biased due to overappealing by the Australian cricket team. He was cleared of the charges.

In January 2010 he resigned because of alleged differences between himself and Cricket South Africa. The reports say Cricket South Africa Chief Executive Gerald Majola will oversee the interim selection process with former South African fast bowler Corrie van Zyl and former South African captain Kepler Wessels for the two-Test and three-ODI tour of India.

=== Australia ===
Arthur was the coach of the Western Warriors and later coached the Australian cricket team. During the 2013 Australian tour of India, Arthur was criticised for his role in the Homeworkgate scandal, where he required members of the team to complete homework. He continued to coach the team until the Champions Trophy-2013 in England, where Australia crashed out in the group stages. As a pre-emptive measure ahead of the upcoming Ashes series in England, Mickey Arthur was sacked and replaced by Darren Lehmann.

In August 2013, Arthur was appointed as the head coach and director of cricket at Christ Church Grammar School, an Anglican all-boys' school in Perth, Western Australia.

In 2016, Arthur became a naturalised Australian citizen.

=== Karachi Kings ===
He was appointed as the head coach of Karachi Kings in the debut season of Pakistan Super League which was held from 4 February 2016 to 23 February 2016 in the United Arab Emirates. They came fourth in a five-team group table due to which they had to play third-placed Islamabad United in the elimination round, where they lost by 9 wickets and were knocked-out of the tournament.

On 13 November 2019, he was replaced by Dean Jones as the head coach.

=== Dhaka Dynamites ===
He was appointed as the head coach of Dhaka Dynamites for 2015 BPL season.

=== Pakistan ===
He was appointed as head coach of the Pakistan Cricket Team on 6 May 2016, thus becoming a head coach of an international team for the third time. He has had his fair share of success with Pakistan. Under his guidance Pakistan became the number one ranked test and T20 side. He coached Pakistan to the 2017 ICC Champions Trophy title on 18 June, with a stunning 180 run victory against arch-rivals India in the finals. This was the first time Pakistan Cricket Team managed to win ICC Champions Trophy since the inception of the tournament in 1998. Following the 2017 ICC Champions Trophy win, Pakistan whitewashed Sri Lanka in an ODI and T20 series after losing the Test series. On 8 July 2018, Pakistan won a triangular series among Zimbabwe, Australia and Pakistan. Pakistan defeated Australia in the final with 6 wickets. Pakistan maintained their no. 1 ranking in T20.

On 7 August 2019, the Pakistan Cricket Board chose not to renew Arthur's contract as coach of the national side.

Arthur was approached to return as head coach of Pakistan after Saqlain Mustaq's contract ends in February 2023 but turned it down saying "He was absolutely committed to the project he'd started at Derbyshire" according to Derbyshire CEO Ryan Duckett. However, the PCB later offered Arthur to become the Pakistan cricket team's director which allowed him to work with both Derbyshire and Pakistan with Arthur also not required to travel for any bilateral series. On 20 April 2023, Arthur was appointed Pakistan's director. He later resigned.

=== Sri Lanka ===
Appointed as the coach of Sri Lanka cricket since Feb 2020 – November 2021

=== Derbyshire ===
Mickey Arthur joined Derbyshire upon the expiry of his Sri Lankan contract becoming the Head of Cricket in December 2021 replacing the outgoing Dave Houghton. He moved to bring in Suranga Lakmal as an overseas player on a two-year deal and later added Shan Masood for the solitary season. After injuries and international duty caused both players to be unavailable for periods he also brought in Hilton Carwright and Hayden Kerr.

=== Dambulla Aura ===
Mickey Arthur works for Dambulla Aura as the head coach in the Lanka Premier
