= Imran Tahir =

South African cricketer

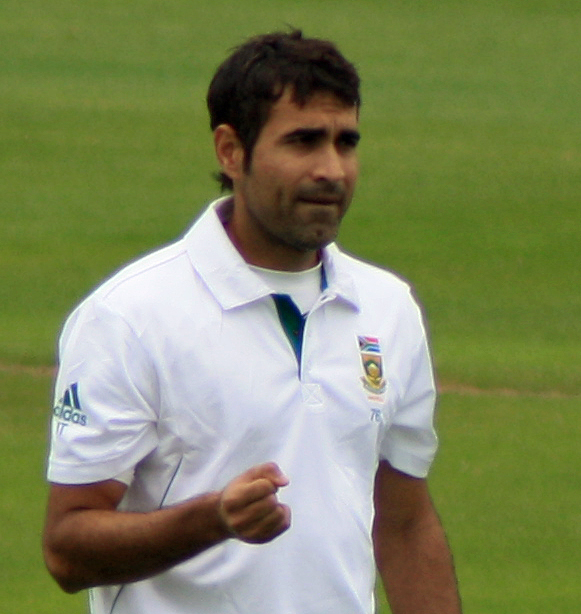
- Tahir playing for South Africa against Somerset in July 2012

Personal information
- Full name: Mohammad Imran Tahir
- Born: 27 March 1979 (age 47); Lahore, Punjab, Pakistan
- Height: 1.78 m (5 ft 10 in)
- Batting: Right-handed
- Bowling: Right-arm leg break
- Role: Bowler

International information
- National side: South Africa (2011–2019)
- Test debut (cap 310): 9 November 2011 v Australia
- Last Test: 3 December 2015 v India
- ODI debut (cap 102): 24 February 2011 v West Indies
- Last ODI: 6 July 2019 v Australia
- ODI shirt no.: 99
- T20I debut (cap 58): 2 August 2013 v Sri Lanka
- Last T20I: 19 March 2019 v Sri Lanka
- T20I shirt no.: 99

Domestic team information
- Years: Team
- 1996/97–2005/06: Lahore (Note: Only clubs that Tahir has played for more than one season are included in this list.)
- 1997/98–1998/99: WAPDA
- 2001/02–2003/04: Sui Northern Gas
- 2004/05–2006/07: PIA
- 2007/08–2009/10: Titans
- 2008–2014: Hampshire
- 2008/09–2009/10: Easterns
- 2010/11–2025/26: Dolphins
- 2012/13–2013/14: Lions
- 2014–2016: Delhi Daredevils
- 2015–2016: Nottinghamshire
- 2018, 2020–2022: Multan Sultans
- 2018–2021: Chennai Super Kings
- 2018–2025: Guyana Amazon Warriors
- 2018–2019: Nelson Mandela Bay Giants
- 2021–2022: Birmingham Phoenix
- 2023–2024: Joburg Super Kings

Career statistics
Competition	Test	ODI	T20I	FC
Matches	20	107	38	194
Runs scored	130	157	19	2,617
Batting average	9.28	7.85	19.00	14.22
100s/50s	0/0	0/0	0/0	0/4
Top score	29*	29	9*	77*
Balls bowled	3,925	5,541	845	38,291
Wickets	57	173	63	784
Bowling average	40.24	24.83	15.04	26.63
5 wickets in innings	2	3	2	53
10 wickets in match	0	0	0	11
Best bowling	5/32	7/45	5/23	8/42
Catches/stumpings	8/–	25/–	7/–	82/–
- Source: ESPNcricinfo, 24 July 2019

Mohammad Imran Tahir (Punjabi: عمران طاہر; born 27 March 1979) is a South African former international cricketer. A spin bowler who predominantly bowls googlies and a right-handed batsman, Tahir played for South Africa in all three formats of cricket.

On 15 June 2016, Tahir became the first South African bowler to take seven wickets in an ODI, and also the fastest South African to reach 100 ODI wickets (58 matches). He is currently South Africa's leading wicket-taker among spin bowlers in both ODIs and T20Is.

On 17 February 2017, Tahir became the fastest South African to reach 50 T20I wickets. On 4 March 2017, against New Zealand he recorded the most economical figures by a South African spinner in an ODI, with 2 wickets for 14 runs from 10 overs.

On 3 October 2018, he became the fourth bowler for South Africa to take a hat-trick in ODIs. In March 2019, he announced that he would quit ODI cricket following the 2019 Cricket World Cup.

He represented his eighth English county club, when he joined Surrey in 2019, thus setting a new record.

He is widely known for his running celebration after every wicket he takes, known as The Marathon.

== Early and personal life ==
Imran Tahir was born in Lahore, Pakistan, and learnt the game while growing up there. Being the eldest sibling, he started working at the age of 16 as a retail salesman at Lahore's Pace Shopping Mall on a meagre salary, to support his family. His fortunes changed when he was selected during trials to represent the Pakistan U-19 cricket team, eventually progressing onto the Pakistan A team on some tours. However, he failed to make the transition to the next stage.

He began playing county cricket in England but did not stay there for long. He then moved to South Africa, which faced a perennial dearth of quality spinners. In South Africa, he played domestic cricket for five years and lived "hand-to-mouth for the first two years."

== Domestic and T20 career ==
As well as his first-class career in Pakistan, Tahir has played for numerous teams in South Africa, India and England.

Notably, he has represented eight first-class English counties: Derbyshire, Durham, Hampshire, Middlesex, Nottinghamshire, Surrey, Warwickshire and Yorkshire. He also played for Staffordshire in the Minor Counties Cricket Championship.

While Tahir has represented Pakistan Under-19 cricket team's and Pakistan A, he failed to win full international honours for Pakistan. In 2005, aged 26, Tahir became a resident of South Africa. He is married to Sumayya Dildar, a South African woman, and has represented South Africa after becoming eligible to play for them when he met his four-year residence requirement in April 2009. Tahir was a member of Hampshire's 2009 Friends Provident Trophy winning squad, taking 2/50 from 10 overs in the final against Sussex. Tahir made his career high score of 77 not out in a County Championship match against Somerset on 28 August 2009.

For the 2010 season Hampshire signed Sri Lankan spinner Ajantha Mendis, replacing Tahir for the season. Tahir represented Warwickshire for the 2010 season, and then represented Hampshire again until 2014.

Tahir made his 100th first-class appearance in the 2009/2010 SuperSport Series when the Titans played the Lions. On 8 January Tahir was called up to the South Africa squad in their Test series against England although he was then withdrawn one day later after Cricket South Africa revealed that he was not eligible to play.

At the end of the 2009/10 season, Tahir moved from the Titans to the Dolphins. This was due to a lack of first-class cricket with the club, who preferred to play 23-year-old leg-spinner Shaun von Berg. When Tahir was called into South Africa's squad for the final Test against England, national coach Mickey Arthur said "I'm not entirely sure what the issues are between him and the Titans, but the Titans obviously aren't going to pick him because they'd rather pick the young leggie they have". He holds the record for representing highest number of teams (27) in the world. He moved to the Highveld Lions in 2012.

In January 2018, he was bought by the Chennai Super Kings in the 2018 IPL auction. He took 26 wickets for the team in IPL 2019, winning the Purple Cap.

In October 2018, he was named in Nelson Mandela Bay Giants' squad for the first edition of the Mzansi Super League T20 tournament.

In July 2019, he was selected to play for the Amsterdam Knights in the inaugural edition of the Euro T20 Slam cricket tournament. However, the following month the tournament was cancelled. In September 2019, he was named in the squad for the Nelson Mandela Bay Giants team for the 2019 Mzansi Super League tournament.

In July 2020, he was named in the Guyana Amazon Warriors squad for the 2020 Caribbean Premier League. Tahir was designated Captain of the Guyana Amazon Warriors in 2023. The Guyana Amazon Warriors went on to win the tournament that same year, their first championship win ever.

On 9 August 2021, whilst playing for Birmingham Phoenix against Welsh Fire, Tahir became the first bowler to take a hat-trick in the inaugural season of The Hundred. In November 2021, he was selected to play for the Dambulla Giants following the players' draft for the 2021 Lanka Premier League.

On 30 October 2023 Pakistan Cricket Board announced that Imran Tahir will be the mentor of team Bahawalpur in upcoming Pakistan Junior Cricket League.

== International career ==
Tahir was first called up to the South African Test team in 2010 when England were touring, but it was an error by the selection committee as he would not eligible to play for South Africa until January 2011. He was quickly withdrawn from the team then, but found his way back almost immediately after becoming eligible to play.

Tahir qualified for South Africa on 1 January 2011, and was selected by them for the 2011 Cricket World Cup. Although he was part of South Africa's squad to play a five-match ODI series against India before the World Cup, Tahir did not make his debut. Captain Graeme Smith explained that this was because "[Tahir] is someone we want to keep fresh and we didn't want to give people the opportunity to see too much of him."

Imran Tahir debuted for South Africa in a match against the West Indies on 24 February 2011 at the Feroz Shah Kotla stadium in Delhi. He took 4 wickets for 41 runs in 10 overs during his debut match. He impressed immediately, picking 14 wickets in the five games he played.

He made his Test debut against Australia at Cape Town in November 2011 and was a regular part of the squad for four years. In the Test series against Pakistan in UAE in 2013, he was not picked for the first Test, but he came back strongly in the second by bagging a five-wicket haul on the first day of the Test match. Tahir was left out once again after one bad Test with the ball against India and was replaced by Robin Peterson, but he continued to do well in the shorter forms of the game. He continued to be a regular member of the South African team in all formats and played Test matches in spin-friendly conditions.

In November 2012 Tahir bowled 37 overs in a Test match against Australia, with no wickets for 260 runs – the worst bowling figures in Test match history. After the Test, he was dropped and replaced by Robin Peterson. In October 2013, Tahir made a comeback to Test cricket when he took 5 wickets in an innings for the first time in a Test match and guided South Africa to clinch victory against Pakistan by an innings and 92 runs in the Dubai Test, levelling the series 1–1. He took 8 wickets in the match.

At the 2014 ICC World Twenty20, Tahir returned his best figures, of 4–21, in South Africa's match against the Netherlands on 27 March 2014, and was awarded Man of the match. Tahir was joint highest wicket-taker in the tournament along with Ahsan Malik from the Netherlands; both took 12 wickets in the tournament.

In the 2015 ICC Cricket World Cup quarter-final match between South Africa and Sri Lanka, Tahir helped South Africa to their first ever World Cup knockout win with a Man of the Match performance of 4-26. At the end of 2015 he was named in the ICC ODI team of the year.

In February 2017 he reached the top position in both the ODI and T20I rankings for bowlers, and three months later was named T20I Cricketer of the Year at Cricket South Africa's annual awards. In August 2017, he was named in a World XI team to play three Twenty20 International matches against Pakistan in the 2017 Independence Cup in Lahore.

=== 2019 Cricket World Cup ===
In April 2019, he was named in South Africa's squad for the 2019 Cricket World Cup. He played in the opening match of the tournament, against hosts England. At the age of 40 years and 64 days, Tahir became the oldest cricketer for South Africa to play in a World Cup match. He bowled the opening over of the tournament, therefore becoming the first spinner to bowl the first over in a World Cup match. Tahir also took the first wicket of the World Cup, dismissing England's Jonny Bairstow for a duck. In South Africa's next match in the World Cup, against Bangladesh, Tahir played in his 100th ODI. Tahir retired from the game after playing his team's last group stage match against Australia, along with teammate JP Duminy.

In November 2020, Tahir was nominated for the ICC Men's T20I Cricketer of the Decade award.
