= 2024 Islamabad United season =

2024 season of Islamabad United

Islamabad United
2024 season
- Coach: Mike Hesson
- Captain: Shadab Khan
- Ground(s): Rawalpindi Cricket Stadium
- PSL 2024: Champions
- Most runs: Colin Munro (326)
- Most wickets: Naseem Shah (15)

Islamabad United is a franchise cricket team that represents Islamabad in the Pakistan Super League (PSL). They were one of the six teams that competed in the 2024 Pakistan Super League. The team was coached by Mike Hesson, and captained by Shadab Khan. They became champions after winning the 2024 PSL final against Multan Sultans.

== Squad ==
- Players with international caps are listed in **bold**.
- Ages are given as of 17 February 2024, the date of the first match in the tournament.

No.	Name	Nationality	Birth date	Category	Batting style	Bowling style	Year signed	Notes
Batsmen
10	**Alex Hales**	England	3 January 1989 (aged 35)	Gold	Right-handed	Right-arm medium	2021	
18	Shamyl Hussain	Pakistan	10 October 2004 (aged 19)	Supplementary	Left-handed	—	2024	
31	**Martin Guptill**	New Zealand	30 September 1986 (aged 37)	—N/a	Right-handed	Right-arm off-break	2024	Full replacement for Muhammad Waseem
46	**Haider Ali**	Pakistan	2 October 2000 (aged 23)	Supplementary	Right-handed	—	2024	
82	**Colin Munro**	New Zealand	11 March 1987 (aged 36)	Gold	Left-handed	Right-arm medium-fast	2020	
	**Muhammad Waseem**	United Arab Emirates	12 February 1994 (aged 30)	—N/a	Right-handed	Right-arm medium	2024	Full replacement for Tom Curran
All-rounders
5	**Matthew Forde**	West Indies	29 April 2002 (aged 21)	Silver	Right-handed	Right-arm medium	2024	
7	**Shadab Khan**	Pakistan	4 October 1998 (aged 25)	Platinum	Right-handed	Right-arm leg break	2017	Captain
9	**Imad Wasim**	Pakistan	18 December 1988 (aged 35)	Diamond	Left-handed	Left-arm orthodox	2024	
41	**Faheem Ashraf**	Pakistan	16 January 1994 (aged 30)	Gold	Left-handed	Right-arm fast-medium	2018	
49	**Qasim Akram**	Pakistan	1 December 2002 (aged 21)	Silver	Right-handed	Right-arm off-break	2024	
59	**Tom Curran**	England	15 March 1995 (aged 28)	Supplementary	Right-handed	Right-arm fast-medium	2023	
67	**Salman Ali Agha**	Pakistan	23 November 1993 (aged 30)	Silver	Right-handed	Right-arm off-break	2024	
98	Shahab Khan	Pakistan		Silver	Left-handed	Left-arm medium-fast	2024	
Wicket-keepers
22	Jordan Cox	England	21 October 2000 (aged 23)	Platinum	Right-handed	Right-arm off-break	2024	
23	**Azam Khan**	Pakistan	10 August 1998 (aged 25)	Diamond	Right-handed	—	2022	
Bowlers
11	**Rumman Raees**	Pakistan	18 October 1991 (aged 32)	Silver	Right-handed	Right-arm fast-medium	2023	
12	Ubaid Shah	Pakistan	5 February 2006 (aged 18)	Emerging	Right-handed	Right-arm medium-fast	2024	
56	**Tymal Mills**	England	12 August 1992 (aged 31)	Diamond	Right-handed	Left-arm fast	2023	
61	**Obed McCoy**	West Indies	4 January 1997 (aged 27)	Supplementary	Left-handed	Left-arm fast-medium	2024	
71	**Naseem Shah**	Pakistan	15 February 2003 (aged 21)	Platinum	Right-handed	Right-arm fast	2024	
72	Hunain Shah	Pakistan	4 February 2004 (aged 20)	Emerging	Right-handed	Right-arm fast-medium	2024	

- Source: ESPNcricinfo

== Administration and support staff ==
Position	Name
Manager	Rehan-ul-Haq
Head coach	Mike Hesson
Batting coach	Ashley Wright
Bowling coach	Azhar Mahmood
Performance coach	Hanif Malik
Analyst	Ben Jones
Team doctor	Jason Pilgram

- Source: Official website.

== Kit manufacturers and sponsors ==
Shirt sponsor (chest)	Shirt sponsor (back)	Chest branding	Sleeve branding
Foodpanda	Tim Hortons	Fast Cables	Tetra Pak, Hum News, TCL

Home kit

Away kit

Source: ProPakistani

== Season standings ==
=== Points table ===
Pos	Team	Pld	W	L	NR	Pts	NRR
1	Multan Sultans (R)	10	7	3	0	14	1.150
2	Peshawar Zalmi (3rd)	10	6	3	1	13	0.147
3	Islamabad United (C)	10	5	4	1	11	0.224
4	Quetta Gladiators (4th)	10	5	4	1	11	−0.921
5	Karachi Kings	10	4	6	0	8	−0.192
6	Lahore Qalandars	10	1	8	1	3	−0.554

Source: ESPNcricinfo

The four top-ranked teams qualified for the Playoffs.
Advanced to Qualifier
Advanced to Eliminator 1

Notes

- C = Champions;
- R = Runner-up;
- (x) = Position at the end of the tournament;

== Group fixtures ==
Match 1
17 February 2024
20:00 (D/N)
Scorecard

(H) Lahore Qalandars; 195/5 (20 overs)	v	Islamabad United; 200/2 (18.2 overs)
Rassie van der Dussen 71* (41); Tymal Mills 2/45 (4 overs)		Shadab Khan 74* (41); Salman Fayyaz 1/23 (2.2 overs)

Islamabad United won by 8 wickets
Gaddafi Stadium, Lahore
Umpires: Aleem Dar (Pak) and Michael Gough (Eng)
Player of the match: Shadab Khan (Islamabad United)

- Islamabad United won the toss and elected to field.
- Ubaid Shah (Islamabad United) and Salman Fayyaz (Lahore Qalandars) both made their T20 debuts.

Match 5
20 February 2024
19:00 (D/N)
Scorecard

Islamabad United; 144 (20 overs)	v	(H) Multan Sultans; 145/5 (19.5 overs)
Salman Ali Agha 52 (43); Mohammad Ali 3/19 (4 overs)		Reeza Hendricks 58 (46); Naseem Shah 2/27 (4 overs)

Multan Sultans won by 5 wickets
Multan Cricket Stadium, Multan
Umpires: Faisal Afridi (Pak) and Chris Gaffaney (NZ)
Player of the match: Mohammad Ali (Multan Sultans)

- Multan Sultans won the toss and elected to field.

Match 8
22 February 2024
19:00 (D/N)
Scorecard

Islamabad United; 138/9 (20 overs)	v	Quetta Gladiators; 139/7 (18.2 overs)
Salman Ali Agha 33 (23); Abrar Ahmed 3/18 (4 overs)		Jason Roy 37 (18); Shadab Khan 2/24 (4 overs)

Quetta Gladiators won by 3 wickets
Gaddafi Stadium, Lahore
Umpires: Aleem Dar (Pak) and Richard Illingworth (Eng)
Player of the match: Rilee Rossouw (Quetta Gladiators)

- Quetta Gladiators won the toss and elected to field.

Match 13
26 February 2024
19:00 (D/N)
Scorecard

Peshawar Zalmi; 201/5 (20 overs)	v	Islamabad United; 193/9 (20 overs)
Babar Azam 111* (63); Shadab Khan 2/28 (4 overs)		Azam Khan 75 (30); Arif Yaqoob 5/27 (4 overs)

Peshawar Zalmi won by 8 runs
Gaddafi Stadium, Lahore
Umpires: Richard Illingworth (Eng) and Shozab Raza (Pak)
Player of the match: Babar Azam (Peshawar Zalmi)

- Islamabad United won the toss and elected to field.

Match 15
28 February 2024
19:00 (D/N)
Scorecard

(H) Karachi Kings; 165/5 (20 overs)	v	Islamabad United; 169/3 (18.3 overs)
Kieron Pollard 48* (28); Salman Ali Agha 1/17 (2 overs)		Colin Munro 82 (47); Mohammad Nawaz 1/23 (4 overs)

Islamabad United won by 7 wickets
National Stadium, Karachi
Umpires: Chris Gaffaney (NZ) and Rashid Riaz (Pak)
Player of the match: Colin Munro (Islamabad United)

- Islamabad United won the toss and elected to field.

Match 18
2 March 2024
19:00 (D/N)
Scorecard

(H) Islamabad United	v	Quetta Gladiators

Rawalpindi Cricket Stadium, Rawalpindi
Umpires: Richard Illingworth (Eng) and Asif Yaqoob (Pak)

- No toss.
- No play was possible due to rain.

Match 20
4 March 2024
19:00 (D/N)
Scorecard

(H) Islamabad United; 196/4 (20 overs)	v	Peshawar Zalmi; 167/9 (20 overs)
Shadab Khan 80 (51); Saim Ayub 2/15 (2 overs)		Aamer Jamal 87 (49); Shadab Khan 3/41 (4 overs)

Islamabad United won by 29 runs
Rawalpindi Cricket Stadium, Rawalpindi
Umpires: Richard Illingworth (Eng) and Asif Yaqoob (Pak)
Player of the match: Shadab Khan (Islamabad United)

- Peshawar Zalmi won the toss and elected to field.

Match 23
6 March 2024
19:00 (D/N)
Scorecard

Lahore Qalandars; 162/7 (20 overs)	v	(H) Islamabad United; 145 (18.5 overs)
Rassie van der Dussen 64 (44); Rumman Raees 2/19 (3 overs)		Faheem Ashraf 41* (31); Zaman Khan 4/37 (3.5 overs)

Lahore Qalandars won by 17 runs
Rawalpindi Cricket Stadium, Rawalpindi
Umpires: Ahsan Raza (Pak) and Alex Wharf (Eng)
Player of the match: Rassie van der Dussen (Lahore Qalandars)

- Islamabad United won the toss and elected to field.
- Tayyab Abbas (Lahore Qalandars) made his T20 debut.

Match 24
7 March 2024
19:00 (D/N)
Scorecard

Karachi Kings; 150/7 (20 overs)	v	(H) Islamabad United; 151/5 (18.4 overs)
Kieron Pollard 39 (28); Tymal Mills 3/34 (4 overs)		Shadab Khan 34 (26); Mir Hamza 3/41 (4 overs)

Islamabad United won by 5 wickets
Rawalpindi Cricket Stadium, Rawalpindi
Umpires: Ruchira Palliyaguruge (SL) and Alex Wharf (Eng)
Player of the match: Faheem Ashraf (Islamabad United)

- Islamabad United won the toss and elected to field.

Match 27
10 March 2024
14:00
Scorecard

Multan Sultans; 228/4 (20 overs)	v	(H) Islamabad United; 232/7 (20 overs)
Usman Khan 100* (50); Faheem Ashraf 2/32 (3 overs)		Colin Munro 84 (40); Abbas Afridi 3/40 (4 overs)

Islamabad United won by 3 wickets
Rawalpindi Cricket Stadium, Rawalpindi
Umpires: Mohammad Asif (Pak) and Ruchira Palliyaguruge (SL)
Player of the match: Colin Munro (Islamabad United)

- Islamabad United won the toss and elected to field.
- As a result of this match, Islamabad United qualified for the playoffs.

== Playoffs ==
=== Eliminator 1 ===
Match 32
15 March 2024
21:00 (N)
Scorecard

Islamabad United; 174/9 (20 overs)	v	Quetta Gladiators; 135 (18.4 overs)
Martin Guptill 56 (47); Mohammad Amir 2/20 (4 overs)		Omair Yousuf 50 (37); Imad Wasim 3/12 (4 overs)

Islamabad United won by 39 runs
National Stadium, Karachi
Umpires: Chris Gaffaney (NZ) and Ahsan Raza (Pak)
Player of the match: Imad Wasim (Islamabad United)

- Islamabad United won the toss and elected to bat.

=== Eliminator 2 ===
Match 33
16 March 2024
21:00 (N)
Scorecard

Peshawar Zalmi; 185/5 (20 overs)	v	Islamabad United; 189/5 (19 overs)
Saim Ayub 73 (44); Naseem Shah 3/30 (4 overs)		Imad Wasim 59* (40); Saim Ayub 2/34 (3 overs)

Islamabad United won by 5 wickets
National Stadium, Karachi
Umpires: Richard Illingworth (Eng) and Asif Yaqoob (Pak)
Player of the match: Imad Wasim (Islamabad United)

- Islamabad United won the toss and elected to field.

=== Final ===
Match 34
18 March 2024
21:00 (N)
Scorecard

Multan Sultans; 159/9 (20 overs)	v	Islamabad United; 163/8 (20 overs)
Usman Khan 57 (40); Imad Wasim 5/23 (4 overs)		Martin Guptill 50 (32); Iftikhar Ahmed 2/19 (3 overs)

Islamabad United won by 2 wickets
National Stadium, Karachi
Umpires: Chris Gaffaney (NZ) and Richard Illingworth (Eng)
Player of the match: Imad Wasim (Islamabad United)

- Multan Sultans won the toss and elected to bat.
- By winning in the final, Islamabad United became the most successful team in PSL history.

== Statistics ==
=== Most runs ===
Player	Inns	Runs	Ave	HS	50s	100s
Colin Munro	10	326	32.60	84	3	0
Salman Ali Agha	12	310	31.00	64*	2	0
Shadab Khan	12	305	30.50	80	3	0
Azam Khan	10	226	25.11	75	1	0
Alex Hales	10	148	14.80	47	0	0

- Source: ESPNcricinfo

=== Most wickets ===
Player	Inns	Wkts	Ave	BBI
Naseem Shah	11	15	22.20	3/30
Shadab Khan	12	14	26.85	3/32
Imad Wasim	12	12	20.91	5/23
Hunain Shah	9	8	28.12	2/25
Tymal Mills	6	6	36.00	3/34

- Source: ESPNcricinfo
