= Ubaid Shah =

Pakistani cricketer

Personal information
- Full name: Ubaid Shah
- Born: 5 February 2006 (age 20); Lower Dir District, Khyber Pakhtunkhwa, Pakistan
- Batting: Right-handed
- Bowling: Right-arm fast-medium
- Role: Bowler
- Relatives: Naseem Shah (brother); Hunain Shah (brother)

International information
- National side: Pakistan (2026–present)
- Only Test (cap 265): 2 August 2026 v West Indies

Domestic team information
- Years: Team
- 2024: Islamabad United (squad no. 13)
- 2025: Multan Sultans (squad no. 12)
- 2026: Lahore Qalandars (squad no. 73)

Career statistics
Competition	Test	FC	LA	T20
Matches	1	17	17	36
Runs scored	0	183	29	49
Batting average	0.00	7.62	3.62	4.90
100s/50s	0/0	0/0	0/0	0/0
Top score	0	37	11	17
Balls bowled	108	2,773	680	683
Wickets	2	74	18	37
Bowling average	39.50	25.59	36.33	28.35
5 wickets in innings	0	2	0	0
10 wickets in match	0	1	0	0
Best bowling	2/66	8/79	4/41	3/27
Catches/stumpings	0/–	6/–	5/–	8/–
- Source: Cricinfo, 24 August 2026

Ubaid Shah (Urdu: عبید شاہ, Pashto: عبید شاہ; born 5 February 2006), also spelled as Obaid Shah, is a Pakistani cricketer who is a right-arm medium fast bowler for Lahore Qalandars and the Pakistan Cricket Team.

== Early life ==
The younger brother of cricketers Hunain Shah and Naseem Shah, Ubaid was brought up in the Jandol Mayar area of Lower Dir District in Pakistan’s Khyber Pakhtunkhwa province. His family moved to Lahore in 2018, when his older brother Salim started a gemstone business.

== Youth career ==
He played for the Pakistan U19 which reached the semi-finals at the 2024 Under-19 Cricket World Cup in South Africa. He was named in the ICC team of the tournament after picking up 18 wickets at an average of less than 14 runs per wicket.

== Domestic career ==
Ubaid plays in the Pakistan Super League for Islamabad United. He made his debut against Lahore Qalandars on 17 February 2024.

== International career ==
In July 2026, it was announced that Shah was included in the Pakistan squad for the upcoming tours of West Indies and England. Aaqib Javed's rationale for his selection was his pace as well the fact that he took 72 first-class wickets in 16 matches since making his debut in October 2024.
