= 2024 Pakistan Super League final =

Cricket match

- Event: 2024 Pakistan Super League
Multan Sultans	Islamabad United
Multan Sultans team colours
159/9	163/8
20 overs	20 overs
- Islamabad United won by 2 wickets
- Date: 18 March 2024
- Venue: National Stadium, Karachi
- Player of the match: Imad Wasim (Islamabad United)
- Umpires: Chris Gaffaney; Richard Illingworth

The 2024 Pakistan Super League final was a Twenty20 cricket match played between Multan Sultans and Islamabad United to decide the champion of the 2024 season of the Pakistan Super League (PSL) on 18 March 2024 at the National Stadium in Karachi, Pakistan.

== Route to the Final ==
League progression
Team	Group matches										Playoffs		
Team	1	2	3	4	5	6	7	8	9	10	Q1/E	Q2	F
Islamabad United	2	2	2	2	4	5	7	7	9	11	W	W	W
Multan Sultans	2	4	6	6	8	10	12	12	12	14	W		L

Win	Loss	No result

- Note: The total points at the end of each group match are listed.
- Note: Click on the points (group matches) or W/L (playoffs) to see the match summary.

=== Group Stage ===
In the group stage, Multan Sultans finished at the top of the table having 14 points with seven wins and three defeats. While, Islamabad United were placed third with five wins, four defeats and one no result.

=== Playoffs ===
In the qualifier on 14 March 2024, Multan Sultans defeated Peshawar Zalmi by seven wickets to reach their fourth consecutive PSL final.

In the first eliminator of the PSL playoffs on 15 March 2024, Islamabad United beat Quetta Gladiators by 39 runs and progressed into the second eliminator.

In the second eliminator on 16 March 2024, Islamabad United defeated Peshawar Zalmi by five-wickets to reach their third PSL final.

== Match officials ==
- On-field Umpires: Chris Gaffaney and Richard Illingworth
- TV umpire: Ahsan Raza
- Reserve umpire: Asif Yaqoob
- Match referee: Roshan Mahanama

== Match ==
Match 34
18 March 2024
21:00 (N)
Scorecard

Multan Sultans; 159/9 (20 overs)	v	Islamabad United; 163/8 (20 overs)
Usman Khan 57 (40); Imad Wasim 5/23 (4 overs)		Martin Guptill 50 (32); Iftikhar Ahmed 2/19 (3 overs)

Islamabad United won by 2 wickets
National Stadium, Karachi
Umpires: Chris Gaffaney (NZ) and Richard Illingworth (Eng)
Player of the match: Imad Wasim (Islamabad United)

- Multan Sultans won the toss and elected to bat.
- By winning in the final, Islamabad United became the most successful team in PSL history.

=== Scorecard ===
Toss: Multan Sultans won the toss and elected to bat.

Multan Sultans innings
Player	Status	Runs	Balls	4s	6s	Strike rate
Yasir Khan	c Mills b Imad	6	6	1	0	100.00
Mohammad Rizwan	c Guptill b Shadab	26	26	3	0	100.00
David Willey	b Imad	6	3	0	1	200.00
Usman Khan	c sub (Cox) b Shadab	57	40	7	1	142.50
Johnson Charles	c Naseem b Imad	4	6	0	0	66.66
Khushdil Shah	c Guptill b Imad	11	13	1	0	84.61
Usama Mir	c Hunain b Shadab	6	2	0	1	300.00
Iftikhar Ahmed	not out	32	20	3	3	160.00
Chris Jordan	c †Azam b Imad	0	1	0	0	0.00
Abbas Afridi	run out (Shadab/†Azam)	1	2	0	0	50.00
Mohammad Ali	not out	0	3	0	0	0.00
Extras 10 (b 2, lb 3, nb 2, wd 3); Total 159/9 (20 overs)				15	6	7.95 RR

Fall of wickets: 1-8 (Yasir Khan, 1.3 ov), 2-14 (David Willey, 1.6 ov), 3-67 (Mohammad Rizwan, 9.5 ov), 4-85 (Johnson Charles, 11.4 ov), 5-114 (Usman Khan, 15.1 ov), 6-120 (Usama Mir, 15.3 ov), 7-126 (Khushdil Shah, 16.2 ov), 8-126 (Chris Jordan, 16.3 ov), 9-127 (Abbas Afridi, 16.6 ov)

Islamabad United bowling
Bowler	Overs	Maidens	Runs	Wickets	Econ	Wides	NBs
Naseem Shah	4	0	25	0	6.25	1	2
Imad Wasim	4	0	23	5	5.75	0	0
Hunain Shah	1	0	17	0	17.00	0	0
Faheem Ashraf	3	0	33	0	11.00	0	0
Tymal Mills	4	0	24	0	6.00	1	0
Shadab Khan	4	0	32	3	8.00	2	0

Target: 160 runs from 20 overs at 8.00 RR

Islamabad United innings
Player	Status	Runs	Balls	4s	6s	Strike rate
Martin Guptill	run out (Iftikhar/†Rizwan)	50	32	4	3	156.25
Colin Munro	c Iftikhar b Khushdil	17	13	4	0	130.76
Salman Ali Agha	c & b Khushdil	10	11	2	0	90.90
Shadab Khan	b Iftikhar	4	8	0	0	50.00
Azam Khan	c †Rizwan b Mir	30	22	4	1	136.36
Imad Wasim	not out	19	17	2	0	111.76
Haider Ali	c †Rizwan b Willey	0	1	0	0	0.00
Faheem Ashraf	c & b Iftikhar	1	4	0	0	25.00
Naseem Shah	c †Rizwan b M. Ali	17	9	2	1	188.88
Hunain Shah	not out	4	1	1	0	400.00
Tymal Mills	did not bat					
Extras 6 (lb 3, wd 3); Total 163/8 (20 overs)				20	5	8.15 RR

Fall of wickets: 1-26 (Colin Munro, 3.1 ov), 2-46 (Agha Salman, 5.6 ov), 3-55 (Shadab Khan, 8.1 ov), 4-102 (Martin Guptill, 12.5 ov), 5-121 (Azam Khan, 15.3 ov), 6-128 (Haider Ali, 16.2 ov), 7-129 (Faheem Ashraf, 17.1 ov), 8-159 (Naseem Shah, 19.5 ov)

Multan Sultans bowling
Bowler	Overs	Maidens	Runs	Wickets	Econ	Wides	NBs
David Willey	2	0	15	1	7.50	0	0
Khushdil Shah	4	1	21	1	5.25	1	0
Mohammad Ali	4	0	32	1	8.00	0	0
Iftikhar Ahmed	3	0	19	2	6.33	0	0
Chris Jordan	3	0	28	0	9.33	0	0
Usama Mir	3	0	36	1	12.00	1	0
Abbas Afridi	1	0	9	0	9.00	0	0

Result: Islamabad United won by 2 wickets
