= 2022–23 New Zealand Tri-Nation Series =

Cricket tournament

2022 New Zealand Tri-Nation Series
- Date: 7–14 October 2022
- Location: New Zealand
- Result: Pakistan won the tri-series
- Player of the series: (New Zealand) Michael Bracewell
Teams
New Zealand	Bangladesh	Pakistan
Captains
Kane Williamson (Note: Tim Southee captained New Zealand in the fifth match of the series.)	Shakib Al Hasan (Note: Nurul Hasan captained Bangladesh in the first match of the series.)	Babar Azam
Most runs
Devon Conway (233)	Shakib Al Hasan (154)	Mohammad Rizwan (201)
Most wickets
Michael Bracewell (8) Tim Southee (8)	Hasan Mahmud (4)	Mohammad Wasim (7)

The 2022 New Zealand Tri-Nation Series was a cricket tournament that took place in October 2022 as a preparatory series before 2022 ICC Men's T20 World Cup. It was a tri-nation series between New Zealand, Bangladesh and Pakistan, with all the matches played as Twenty20 Internationals (T20Is). On 26 June 2022, Pakistan Cricket Board confirmed their participation in the tournament. On 28 June 2022, New Zealand Cricket confirmed the fixtures with all the matches played at the Hagley Oval, Christchurch.

== Squads ==
Bangladesh	New Zealand	Pakistan
Shakib Al Hasan (c); Nurul Hasan (vc, wk); Nasum Ahmed; Taskin Ahmed; Yasir Ali; Litton Das (wk); Mehidy Hasan; Afif Hossain; Ebadot Hossain; Mosaddek Hossain; Shoriful Islam; Hasan Mahmud; Mustafizur Rahman; Sabbir Rahman; Mohammad Saifuddin; Soumya Sarkar; Najmul Hossain Shanto	Kane Williamson (c); Finn Allen; Trent Boult; Michael Bracewell; Mark Chapman; Dane Cleaver; Devon Conway (wk); ~~Lockie Ferguson~~; Martin Guptill; Adam Milne; ~~Daryl Mitchell~~; James Neesham; Glenn Phillips; Mitchell Santner; Ish Sodhi; Tim Southee; Blair Tickner	Babar Azam (c); Shadab Khan (vc); ~~Shaheen Afridi~~; Iftikhar Ahmed; Asif Ali; Haider Ali; Shahnawaz Dahani; Mohammad Hasnain; Shan Masood; Mohammad Nawaz; Usman Qadir; Haris Rauf; Mohammad Rizwan (wk); Khushdil Shah; Naseem Shah; Mohammad Wasim

Bangladesh named Mahedi Hasan, Rishad Hossain, Shoriful Islam and Soumya Sarkar as standby players. Pakistan named Shahnawaz Dahani, Mohammad Haris and Fakhar Zaman as reserves. Blair Tickner was added to New Zealand's squad before the tournament. New Zealand's Daryl Mitchell was ruled of the series, after sustaining a fractured finger during practice in the nets. Dane Cleaver was named as his replacement. Lockie Ferguson was ruled out due to an abdominal injury.

== Round-robin ==
=== Points table ===
Pos	Team	Pld	W	L	T	NR	Pts	NRR
1	New Zealand	4	3	1	0	0	6	1.133
2	Pakistan	4	3	1	0	0	6	0.132
3	Bangladesh	4	0	4	0	0	0	−1.236

Source: ESPNcricinfo

Advanced to the final

=== Fixtures ===
Match 1
7 October 2022
15:00
Scorecard

Pakistan; 167/5 (20 overs)	v	Bangladesh; 146/8 (20 overs)
Mohammad Rizwan 78* (50); Taskin Ahmed 2/25 (4 overs)		Yasir Ali 42* (21); Mohammad Wasim 3/24 (4 overs)

Pakistan won by 21 runs
Hagley Oval, Christchurch
Umpires: Shaun Haig (NZ) and Wayne Knights (NZ)
Player of the match: Mohammad Rizwan (Pak)

- Bangladesh won the toss and elected to field.

Match 2
8 October 2022
19:10 (N)
Scorecard

New Zealand; 147/8 (20 overs)	v	Pakistan; 149/4 (18.2 overs)
Devon Conway 36 (35); Haris Rauf 3/28 (4 overs)		Babar Azam 79* (53); Blair Tickner 2/42 (4 overs)

Pakistan won by 6 wickets
Hagley Oval, Christchurch
Umpires: Shaun Haig (NZ) and Alex Wharf (Eng)
Player of the match: Babar Azam (Pak)

- New Zealand won the toss and elected to bat.

Match 3
9 October 2022
19:10 (N)
Scorecard

Bangladesh; 137/8 (20 overs)	v	New Zealand; 142/2 (17.5 overs)
Najmul Hossain Shanto 33 (29); Michael Bracewell 2/14 (4 overs)		Devon Conway 70* (51); Hasan Mahmud 1/26 (4 overs)

New Zealand won by 8 wickets
Hagley Oval, Christchurch
Umpires: Wayne Knights (NZ) and Alex Wharf (Eng)
Player of the match: Michael Bracewell (NZ)

- New Zealand won the toss and elected to field.

Match 4
11 October 2022
15:00
Scorecard

Pakistan; 130/7 (20 overs)	v	New Zealand; 131/1 (16.1 overs)
Iftikhar Ahmed 27 (27); Michael Bracewell 2/11 (4 overs)		Finn Allen 62 (42); Shadab Khan 1/26 (4 overs)

New Zealand won by 9 wickets
Hagley Oval, Christchurch
Umpires: Wayne Knights (NZ) and Alex Wharf (Eng)
Player of the match: Michael Bracewell (NZ)

- Pakistan won the toss and elected to bat.

Match 5
12 October 2022
15:00
Scorecard

New Zealand; 208/5 (20 overs)	v	Bangladesh; 160/7 (20 overs)
Devon Conway 64 (40); Mohammad Saifuddin 2/37 (4 overs)		Shakib Al Hasan 70 (44); Adam Milne 3/24 (4 overs)

New Zealand won by 48 runs
Hagley Oval, Christchurch
Umpires: Shaun Haig (NZ) and Alex Wharf (Eng)
Player of the match: Glenn Phillips (NZ)

- Bangladesh won the toss and elected to field.

Match 6
13 October 2022
15:00
Scorecard

Bangladesh; 173/6 (20 overs)	v	Pakistan; 177/3 (19.5 overs)
Litton Das 69 (42); Naseem Shah 2/27 (4 overs)		Mohammad Rizwan 69 (56); Hasan Mahmud 2/27 (4 overs)

Pakistan won by 7 wickets
Hagley Oval, Christchurch
Umpires: Shaun Haig (NZ) and Wayne Knights (NZ)
Player of the match: Mohammad Rizwan (Pak)

- Bangladesh won the toss and elected to bat.

== Final ==
14 October 2022
15:00
Scorecard

New Zealand; 163/7 (20 overs)	v	Pakistan; 168/5 (19.3 overs)
Kane Williamson 59 (38); Haris Rauf 2/22 (4 overs)		Mohammad Nawaz 38* (22); Michael Bracewell 2/14 (4 overs)

Pakistan won by 5 wickets
Hagley Oval, Christchurch
Umpires: Shaun Haig (NZ) and Alex Wharf (Eng)
Player of the match: Mohammad Nawaz (Pak)

- Pakistan won the toss and elected to field.
