= CA Sports =

Pakistani sports equipment company founded 1958

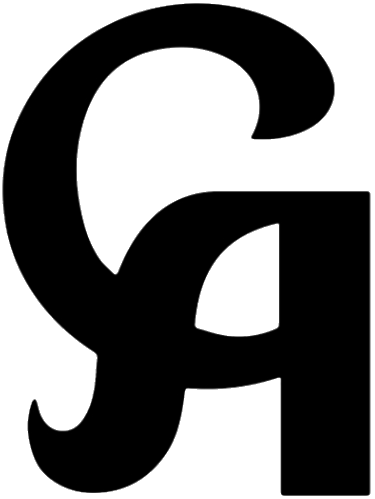
- Type: Private
- Industry: Sports equipment, textile
- Founded: 1958; 68 years ago
- Founder: Charaghdin Abdul Rasheed
- Headquarters: Sialkot, Pakistan
- Area served: Worldwide
- Key people: Zahid Javed (CEO)
- Products: Cricket clothing and equipment, athletic shoes, accessories
- Number of employees: 500+
- Website: www.ca-sports.com.pk

CA Sports is a Pakistani sports equipment manufacturing company headquartered in Sialkot, Punjab, focused on cricket clothing and equipment. Founded in 1958, the company's name refers to the first initials of its founder's name, Charaghdin Abdul Rasheed.

== Products ==
The range of cricket products manufactured by CA Sports include on-field equipment (bat, batting gloves, balls, leg pads, protection guards), clothing (shirts, trousers, raincoats, hoodies, polo shirts), athletic shoes, and accessories (bags, backpacks).

CA Sports have been the official kit sponsor of Pakistan national cricket team, producing and supplying clothing to Pakistan cricket team. The curve-shaped bats, a staple in today's cricket, were first produced by CA in 1979.
