= Richard Pybus =

English cricketer (born 1964)

Personal information
- Full name: Richard Alexander Pybus
- Born: 5 July 1964 (age 62); Newcastle, Northumberland, England

Head coaching information
- Years: Team
- 2011-2012: Bangladesh
- 2026-present: Afghanistan

Richard Alexander Pybus (born 5 July 1964), is an English-born cricket coach. He coached the Pakistan and Bangladesh national teams, and currently serves as the Headcoach of Cricket for the Afghanistan national cricket team. He has held this post since February 2026.

In 2017 he applied for Head coach of Indian cricket team.

== Early life ==
Pybus was born in the North-East of England, He grew up in Newcastle upon Tyne till the age of 12 when his parents emigrated to Australia, attending Normanhurst Boys High School in Sydney. In 1979 his family returned to the UK to the North West of England. Pybus finished his school education at Ulverston Victoria High School in Cumbria. He completed a BA.Hons at Portsmouth University and a postgraduate Certificate of Education at Greenwich University, London.

He is a cricket coach and former coach of the Pakistan and Bangladesh national cricket teams, he was consultant coach to Pakistan during the 1999 Cricket World Cup when they progressed to the final. He is currently the most successful coach in South African first-class cricket having guided the Titans and the Cape Cobras to nine championship titles over six seasons, winning the Supersport Series Four Day Competition four times. He has completed the domestic double three times in a row as a coach, twice with the Titans and once with the Cape Cobras.

He was awarded the South African Cricket Coach of the year in 2008–09 and 2010–11 by Cricket South Africa.

Pybus' cricketing ambitions as a right-arm fast-medium bowler were ended by injury. He played both rugby and minor county cricket for Suffolk, cricket from 1986 to 1991 (cite) cricket archive, and Worcestershire's 2nd XI in 1990. He turned to coaching in his early twenties after five surgeries.

== Coaching career ==
=== Early coaching career ===
Pybus began his professional coaching career at Selborne College in East London, South Africa.

Professional Cricket Coach from 1991 to 1995 where he developed Mark Boucher as a wicket keeper. He was Border U-19 Coach in this period and brought through Makhaya Ntini and Justin Kemp in a side unbeaten at the National U-19 week, captained by Boucher.

Pybus joined Border Cricket in 1995 and ran the Youth Cricket department, before going on to set up Border Cricket's first cricket academy, The Mercedes Benz Border Cricket Academy, of whom Ntini was a graduate.

=== Senior coaching career ===
In 1998 Pybus took up the position of Border Cricket head coach, with Ntini and Boucher being key players in this side. In his first season in charge they got to the finals of the Supersport first-class four day competition and Standard Bank One day competition, it was the first time in Border cricket's history that they had competed in a first-class final.

He was approached by Pakistan to work with them for the 1999 Cricket World Cup where they went on to be losing finalists to Australia. This led to his dismissal. He was then invited to coach Pakistan full-time during the later half of 1999 on a two-year contract, one day into his new contract there was a military coup and the cricket board that had appointed him was dissolved. He was sacked one month into the job, along with Wasim Akram after they lost the Test series to Australia.

In 2000–2001, on a one-year contract with Border cricket he again took them to the Supersport four day final and the Standard Bank One day cup semi-final.

At the end of the South African season he re-joined Pakistan for a third time at the inception of Waqar Younis's captaincy, they toured England, tying the Test series with England 1–1 and losing the One day triangular final to Australia at Lords in a re-run of the 1999 World Cup Final. He was not willing to come to Pakistan but he was persuaded and continued with Pakistan in September 2001 with the Asian Test Championship, beating Bangladesh in Multan. At the end of the Multan Test, Pakistan were due to play a Test series against New Zealand in Pakistan, the series was called off because of the 11 September terrorist attacks and foreign nationals were told to leave the country because of security concerns.

Pakistan Cricket Board Chairman General Tauqir Zia appointed Pybus to coach Pakistan for a fourth time in September 2002 after a series of poor results. It led up to a disappointing Cricket World Cup in 2003 where Pakistan were eliminated in the first round, it was a bridge too far for an aging Pakistan team, coming at the end of an era with the retirements of Wasim Akram, Waqar Younis and Saeed Anwar.

In 2005, Pybus took over as head coach and cricket manager at Titans between 2005 and 2009. In 2005 they were joint Supersport four day champions and losing finalists in the Standard Bank One Day competition.

In the 2006-7 season the Titans won the SuperSport four day competition with a record of played 10, won 8 and were unbeaten during the competition, it is the second best four day record in a season in South African cricket history after the Transvaal 'Mean Machine' played 10 and won 9 in the Currie Cup.

Pybus was appointed 1st XI coach of Middlesex in February 2007. However, on 17 July 2007 Middlesex announced he had left the club with immediate effect "for personal reasons". On 1 August 2007 he re-joined Titans as coach on a two-year contract.

From 2007 to 2009 the Titans built on the success of the previous two years and the side cemented their place as the dominant side in South African first-class cricket. They did the domestic double in 2007-08 where they won the MTN One Day competition and the Pro20 competition. In 2008–09 the side repeated their success by again winning the Supersport four day competition and the One Day competition, Pybus was acknowledged for this success by being awarded the South African Cricket Coach of the year in 2009. Faf du Plessis, Imran Tahir and Farhaan Behardien came through in this period and established their South African credentials.

Having won 6 titles in four years at the Titans, including the Supersport four day competition 3 times in four years, Pybus chose not to re-new his contract and took a sabbatical year. He trained as an Executive Coach and did consultancy coaching work with the Natal Dolphins and with Eastern Province cricket.

On 25 September 2009 it was confirmed that Richard Pybus will be the coach of Kolkata Knight Riders (A team in IPL) Two days before the announcement KKR player Sourav Ganguly had stated that the coach of KKR was decided and would be announced soon.

Pybus wasn't the new KKR coach, he was appointed the coach of the Cape Cobras in South Africa and over the next two seasons would help the Cobra's take over the Titan's mantle of the most successful cricket side in the country. He would again do the domestic double for the third coaching year in a row, this time with a team under his former Border player, Justin Kemp's leadership. The side won the Supersport four day competition and the Pro20 competition to qualify for the Champions League. Vernon Philander and Richard Levi emerged in this period as South African cricketers.

In 2011-12 the Cape Cobras won the One Day competition against the Warriors at Newlands and Pybus had three of his original Border U-19 side on the field, Justin Kemp and Mark Boucher playing for the Cobras and Makhaya Ntini playing for the Warriors. The Cobras having led the Supersport competition for much of the season, lost out to the Titans in the final match of the competition and ended as runners up.

On 30 May 2012, it was announced that he would be the new coach of the Bangladesh cricket team [6], during his tenure they played T20 cricket in a buildup to the T20 Cricket World Cup in Sri Lanka where they played 16 and won 12 during this period. Pybus left them after five months after a contract dispute with the Bangladesh cricket board.
