= Pakistan national cricket team record by opponent =

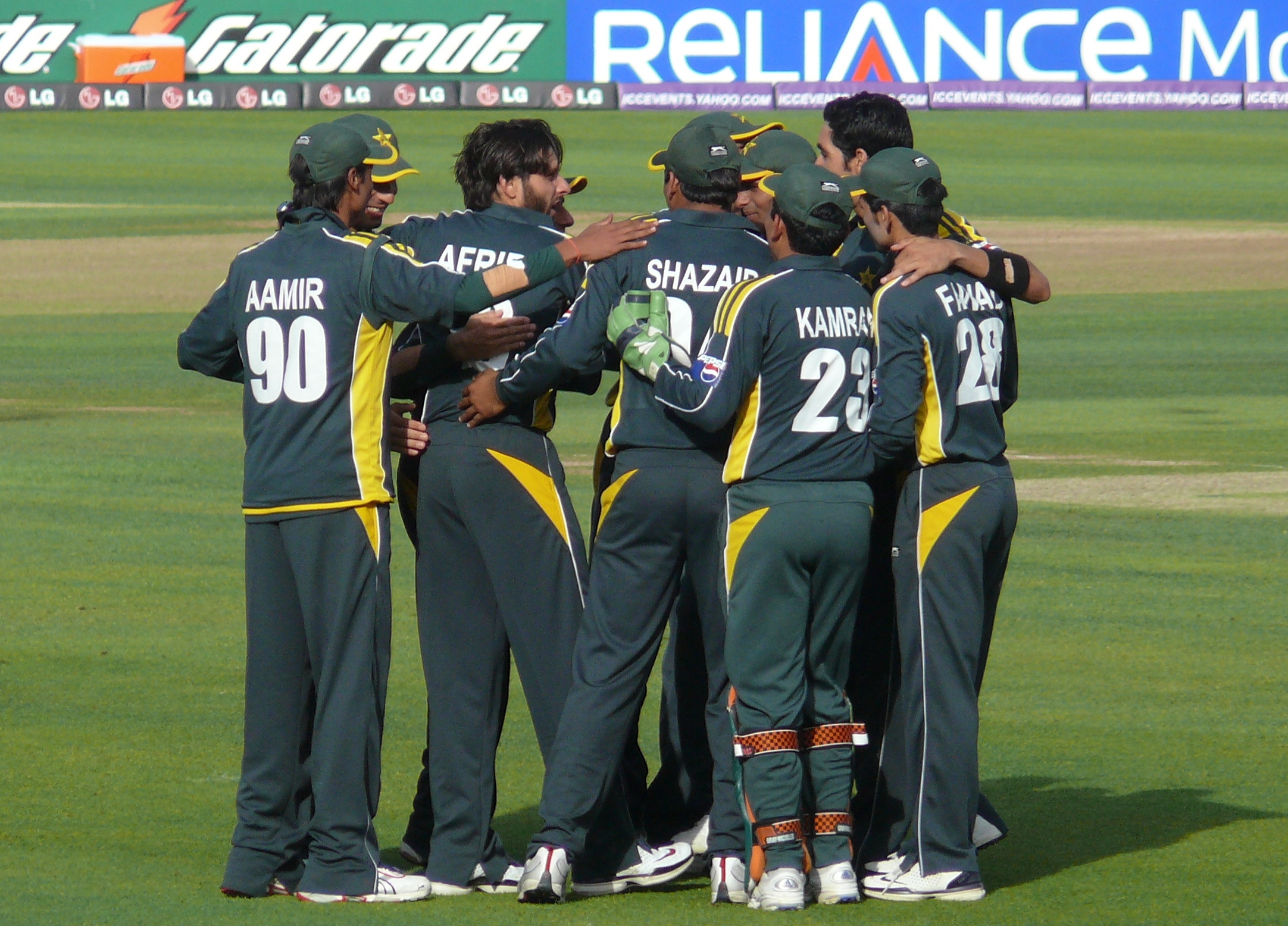
The Pakistan national cricket team against New Zealand during the 2009 ICC World Twenty20 at The Oval.

The Pakistan national cricket team represents Pakistan in international cricket and is a full member of the International Cricket Council (ICC) with Test and One Day International (ODI) status. Pakistan first competed in international cricket in 1952, when they played against India in a four-day Test match; India won the match by an innings and 70 runs at the Feroz Shah Kotla Ground, Delhi. In the same series, Pakistan recorded their first Test win, the second match by an innings and 43 runs at the University Ground, Lucknow. As of September 2026, Pakistan have played 474 Test matches; they have won 153 matches, lost 155 matches, and 166 matches have ended in a draw. They have also won the 1998–99 Asian Test Championship, defeating Sri Lanka in the final by an innings and 175 runs. Pakistan played their first ODI match against New Zealand in February 1973 at the Lancaster Park, Christchurch, but registered their first win against England at Trent Bridge, Nottingham, in August 1974. As of June 2026, Pakistan have played 1003 ODI matches, winning 529 matches and losing 443; they also tied 9 matches, whilst 22 had no result. They also won the 1992 Cricket World Cup, the 2000 and 2012 Asia Cups, and the 2017 ICC Champions Trophy. Pakistan played their first Twenty20 International (T20I) match at the County Cricket Ground, Bristol, on 28 August 2006, against England, winning the match by five wickets. In 2009, they won the 2009 ICC World Twenty20, defeating Sri Lanka by eight wickets. As of October 2026, Pakistan have played 301 T20I matches and won 174 of them; 115 were lost and 4 were tied whilst 8 ended in no result.

As of September 2026, Pakistan have faced ten teams in Test cricket, with their most frequent opponent being England, playing 95 matches against them. Pakistan have registered more wins against New Zealand than any other team, with 25. In ODI matches, Pakistan have played against 19 teams; they have played against Sri Lanka most frequently, with a winning percentage of 60 in 160 matches. Pakistan have defeated Sri Lanka on 96 occasions, which is their best record in ODIs. The team have competed against 20 different teams (including World XI) in T20Is, and have played 50 matches against New Zealand and 31 against Sri Lanka. Pakistan have defeated New Zealand on 24 occasions and Sri Lanka on 18 occasions in T20Is. They have lost to New Zealand 23 times in this format of the game.

== Key ==
.

- M – Number of matches played
- W – Number of matches won
- L – Number of matches lost
- T – Number of matches tied
- D – Number of matches ended in a draw
- NR – Number of matches ended with no result
- Tie+W – Number of matches tied and then won in a tiebreaker such as a bowl-out or Super Over
- Tie+L – Number of matches tied and then lost in a tiebreaker such as a bowl-out or Super Over
- Win% – Percentage of games won to those played (Note: Games that did not have a result are not taken into consideration while calculating the result percentage. Ties are counted as half a win.)
- Loss% – Percentage of games lost to those played
- Draw% – Percentage of games drawn to those played
- First – Year of the first match played by Pakistan against the country
- Last – Year of the last match played by Pakistan against the country

== Test cricket ==
Statistics are correct as of Pakistani cricket team in England in 2026

Pakistan's Test cricket record by opponent
Opponent	Matches	Won	Lost	Tied	Draw	W/L Ratio	% Won	% Lost	% Drew	First	Last
Australia	72	15	37	0	20	0.41	20.83	45.83	27.77	1956	2024
Bangladesh	17	12	4	0	1	3.00	70.59	23.53	5.88	2001	2026
England	95	23	33	0	39	0.69	24.21	34.74	41.05	1954	2026
India	59	12	9	0	38	1.33	20.33	15.25	64.40	1952	2007
Ireland	1	1	0	0	0	-	100.00	00.00	00.00	2018	2018
New Zealand	62	25	14	0	23	1.78	40.32	22.58	37.09	1955	2023
South Africa	32	7	18	0	7	0.39	21.88	56.25	21.86	1995	2025
Sri Lanka	59	23	17	0	19	1.35	38.98	28.81	32.20	1982	2023
West Indies	58	23	20	0	15	1.15	39.66	34.48	25.86	1958	2026
Zimbabwe	19	12	3	0	4	4.00	63.15	15.78	21.05	1993	2021
Total	474	153	155	0	166	0.99	32.28	32.70	35.02	1952	2026
Statistics are correct as of Pakistan v England, 3rd Test, 9–12 September 2026.

== One Day International ==
Statistics are correct as of Australian cricket team in Pakistan in 2026

Opponent	Matches	Won	Lost	Tied	No Result	% Won	First	Last
Full Members
Afghanistan	8	7	1	0	0	87.50	2012	2023
Australia	114	38	72	1	3	34.68	1975	2026
Bangladesh	42	35	7	0	0	83.33	1986	2026
England	92	32	57	0	3	34.78	1974	2023
India	136	73	58	0	5	53.68	1978	2025
Ireland	7	5	1	1	0	71.43	2007	2016
New Zealand	122	61	57	1	3	50	1973	2025
South Africa	90	36	53	0	1	40	1992	2025
Sri Lanka	160	96	59	1	4	60	1975	2025
West Indies	140	64	73	3	0	45.71	1975	2025
Zimbabwe	65	56	5	2	2	86.15	1992	2024
Associate Members
Canada	2	2	0	0	0	100.00	1979	2011
Hong Kong	3	3	0	0	0	100.00	2004	2018
Kenya	6	6	0	0	0	100.00	1996	2011
Namibia	1	1	0	0	0	100.00	2003	2003
Nepal	1	1	0	0	0	100.00	2023	2023
Netherlands	7	7	0	0	0	100.00	1996	2023
Scotland	3	3	0	0	0	100.00	1999	2013
United Arab Emirates	3	3	0	0	0	100.00	1994	2015
Total	1002	529	443	9	21	52.79	1973	2026
Statistics are correct as of Pakistan v Australia at Gaddafi Stadium, Lahore, 4 June 2026.

== Twenty20 International ==
Opponent	Matches	Won	Lost	Tied	Tie+Win	Tie+Loss	No Result	% Won	First	Last
Full Members
Afghanistan	10	6	4	0	0	0	0	60.00	2013	2025
Australia	31	15	14	0	1	0	1	48.39	2007	2026
Bangladesh	27	22	5	0	0	0	0	81.48	2007	2026
England	32	9	21	0	0	1	1	28.13	2006	2026
India	18	3	14	0	0	1	0	16.67	2007	2026
Ireland	5	4	1	0	0	0	0	80.00	2009	2024
New Zealand	50	24	23	0	0	0	3	48	2007	2026
South Africa	27	14	13	0	0	0	0	51.85	2007	2025
Sri Lanka	30	18	12	0	0	0	0	60.00	2007	2026
West Indies	24	17	4	0	0	0	3	70.83	2011	2025
Zimbabwe	23	20	3	0	0	0	0	86.96	2008	2025
Associate Members
Canada	2	2	0	0	0	0	0	100.00	2008	2024
Hong Kong	2	2	0	0	0	0	0	100.00	2022	2023
Kenya	1	1	0	0	0	0	0	100.00	2007	2007
Namibia	2	2	0	0	0	0	0	100.00	2021	2026
Netherlands	3	3	0	0	0	0	0	100.00	2009	2026
Oman	1	1	0	0	0	0	0	100.00	2025	2025
Scotland	4	4	0	0	0	0	0	100.00	2007	2021
United Arab Emirates	4	4	0	0	0	0	0	100.00	2016	2025
United States	2	1	0	0	0	1	0	50	2024	2026
ICC World	3	2	1	0	0	0	0	66.67	2017	2017
Total	301	174	115	0	1	3	8	57.81	2006	2026
Statistics are correct as of Pakistan v India at Kōrogi Athletic Park, Nisshin, 3 October 2026.
