= Mike Hesson =

New Zealand cricket coach (born 1974)

Mike Hesson ONZM
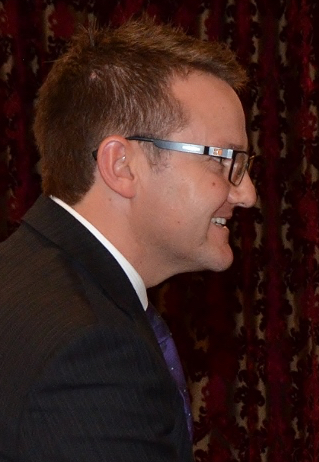
- Hesson in 2015

Personal information
- Full name: Michael James Hesson
- Born: 30 October 1974 (age 52); Dunedin, New Zealand
- Role: Coach

Head coaching information
- Years: Team
- 2003: Argentina
- 2005: Kenya
- 2005-11: Otago
- 2012-18: New Zealand
- 2019-23: Royal Challengers Bengaluru
- 2023-2025: Islamabad United
- 2025-present: Pakistan
Medal record
Men's Cricket
Representing New Zealand as coach
ICC Cricket World Cup
Runner-up	2015 Australia and New Zealand
- Source: ESPNcricinfo, 9 June 2018

Michael James Hesson ONZM (born 30 October 1974) is a New Zealand cricket coach who has served as the head coach of the Pakistan national cricket team in limited-overs cricket since 2025. He served in the same capacity for the New Zealand cricket team. He also coached for the Argentina, Kenya, and Otago in New Zealand domestic cricket. He was appointed head coach of New Zealand on 20 July 2012, taking over from John Wright in August for their tour of India, and later extensions to his contract would have taken him through to the end of the 2019 Cricket World Cup, but Hesson announced his resignation on 7 June 2018, ending his tenure as one of the most successful coaches in the history of the national team. As coach, he led the New Zealand squad to finish as runners-up at the 2015 Cricket World Cup. Since 2023 he has been serving as the head coach of Pakistan Super League franchise Islamabad United. As a coach, he led them to the championship in Pakistan Super League 2024 edition.

== Early life ==
Hesson was born in Dunedin on 30 October 1974. He was educated at Otago Boys' High School.

== Coaching career ==
=== Kenya ===
Prior to his coaching stint with New Zealand, Hesson had served as the coach for Kenya's national cricket team, a position he resigned citing "security concerns".

=== New Zealand ===
Hesson was appointed head coach of New Zealand on 20 July 2012, taking over from John Wright. He was criticised for his controversial recommendation that Ross Taylor should surrender the captaincy in favour of Brendon McCullum However, in 2013–14, Hesson mended the relationship with Taylor and took the BlackCaps to series wins in England and South Africa away, and West Indies and India at home. He also proved his talent for picking players who could translate domestic success into international success. This built momentum for the BlackCaps' revival, culminating in reaching the final of the 2015 Cricket World Cup.

The Black Caps' culture and style of play cultivated by Hesson and McCullum was transformative for cricket in New Zealand. In the 2015 Queen's Birthday Honours Hesson and McCullum were appointed Officers of the New Zealand Order of Merit for services to cricket.

In the 2017/2018 New Zealand summer the BlackCaps were inundated with plaudits as they achieved a New Zealand-record 13-match winning streak in completed games across all formats. From August 2012 to April 2018, when his reign culminated in a Test series win at home against England, Hesson's team played 53 Tests, won 21, lost 19 and drawn 13. By comparison, the 1980s had 59 Tests of which 17 were won, 15 lost and 27 drawn. In completed ODIs, Hesson oversaw 112 for 65 wins, 46 losses and a tie; the 1980s results were 122 played, 56 won and 66 lost. In Twenty20 internationals (not played in the 1980s), the figures were 56 completed games, with 30 wins, 24 losses and two ties.

Hesson was New Zealand's longest serving cricket coach. He developed a reputation for being a calm and brilliant manager, and for developing and maintaining an admirable team culture, all the while taking the BlackCaps to unprecedented success. In May 2018, Hesson was appointed as a coach representative on the International Cricket Council Cricket Committee.

Despite his contract running until the end of 2019 Cricket World Cup, Hesson announced his resignation in June 2018. On 3 January 2019 Hesson joined the Sky Sports commentary team for the home white ball series.

=== Indian Premier League ===
Hesson also served as the head coach of IPL franchise Kings XI Punjab before stepping down on 8 August 2019. Subsequently, on 23 August 2019, he was appointed as the Director of Cricket Operations by the IPL franchise Royal Challengers Bangalore.

=== Pakistan Super League ===
In 2023, Hesson was appointed as the Head Coach of a Pakistan Super League (PSL) franchise Islamabad United.

=== Pakistan ===
On 13 May 2025, the Pakistan Cricket Board (PCB) announced Hesson as the head coach for white-ball (ODIs and T20 Internationals) squads of the Pakistan men’s cricket team.

== YouTube channel ==
In February 2024, Hesson started a YouTube channel named "Coach Hesson". On this channel, Hesson uploads in-depth coaching analysis, previews, and match reviews. As of April 2025, the channel has over 31,500 subscribers.
