= Hunain Shah =

Pakistani cricketer

Personal information
- Born: 4 February 2004 (age 22); Lower Dir District, Khyber Pakhtunkhwa, Pakistan
- Height: 5 ft 9 in (175 cm)
- Batting: Right-handed
- Bowling: Right-arm fast medium
- Role: Bowler
- Relatives: Naseem Shah (brother); Ubaid Shah (brother)

Domestic team information
- Years: Team
- 2022–2023: Central Punjab (squad no. 99)
- 2024–2025: Islamabad United (squad no. 73 previously 72)
- 2026: Hyderabad Kingsmen (squad no. 72)

Career statistics
Competition	FC	LA	T20
Matches	10	9	25
Runs scored	38	50	28
Batting average	7.60	12.50	3.50
100s/50s	0/0	0/0	0/0
Top score	18	24	12
Balls bowled	1,280	350	448
Wickets	22	14	26
Bowling average	35.00	22.07	24.26
5 wickets in innings	0	1	0
10 wickets in match	0	0	0
Best bowling	4/61	6/26	3/20
Catches/stumpings	3/–	1/–	4/–
- Source: , 9 April 2025

Hunain Shah (Urdu: حنین شاہ, Pashto: حنین شاہ; born 4 February 2004) is a Pakistani cricketer who is a right-arm medium fast bowler for Central Punjab and in the Pakistan Super League for Hyderabad Kingsmen.

== Early career ==
Born in Lower Dir in Khyber Pakhtunkhwa province, Hunain moved to Lahore in 2017 for his cricket career, joining the city's Pak Lions International Cricket Academy, later playing at the District Under-16 level.

== Domestic career ==
Shah played for the Central Punjab Whites U19 side in 2021. Shah made his senior T20 debut for Central Punjab in September 2022, taking 2-28 in his 4 overs against Khyber Pakhtunkhwa in the National T20 Cup at the Multan Cricket Stadium.

In November 2020 he made his first-class debut for Central Punjab in the 2022–23 Quaid-e-Azam Trophy. On 18 November 2022 he took his maiden first-class wicket, dismissing Bilawal Iqbal of the Balochistan cricket team.

== Franchise career ==
Shah was selected for the development programme of the Lahore Qalandars in 2020. During the 2026 Pakistan Super League, Shah took 17 wickets at a bowling average of 18.41 and an economy rate of 8.57. After entering the Hyderabad Kingsmen playing XI from the fourth match of the season, he played a key role in the team's run to the final, during which they won seven of their last eight matches. He also defended five runs in the final over against Islamabad United to secure Kingsmen's place in the PSL final.

== Personal life ==
He is the younger brother of Pakistan international cricketer Naseem Shah, they have a younger brother, Ubaid Shah, who played for the Pakistan U19 cricket team at the 2024 U19 World Cup.
