= Naseem Shah =

Pakistani cricketer (born 2003)

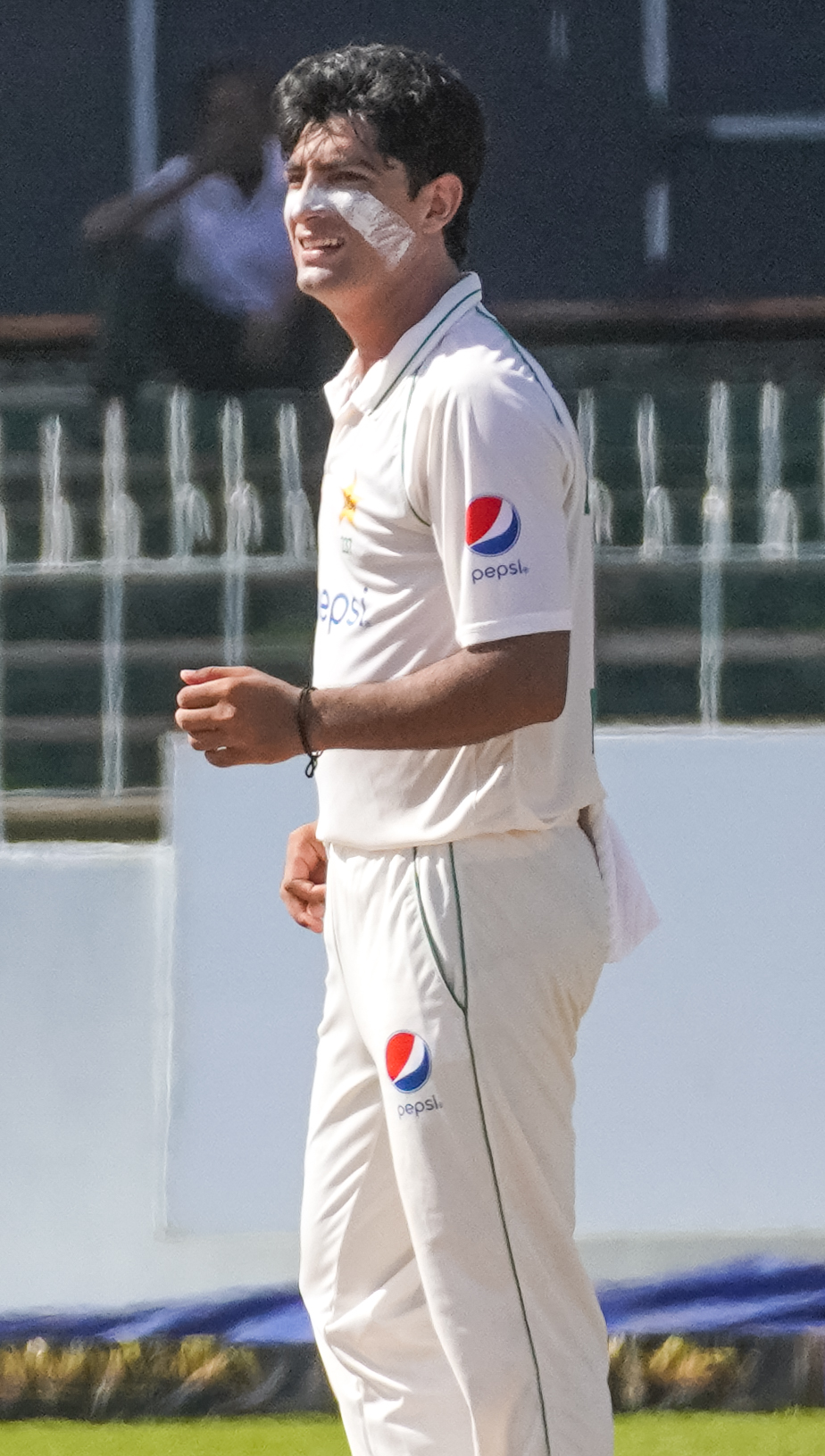
- Shah in 2023

Personal information
- Born: 15 February 2003 (age 23); Mayar, Lower Dir, Khyber Pakhtunkhwa, Pakistan
- Nickname: Lillee Shah
- Height: 5 ft 10 in (178 cm)
- Batting: Right-handed
- Bowling: Right-arm fast
- Role: Bowler
- Relatives: Hunain Shah (brother); Ubaid Shah (brother)

International information
- National side: Pakistan (2019–present)
- Test debut (cap 237): 21 November 2019 v Australia
- Last Test: 26 December 2024 v South Africa
- ODI debut (cap 237): 16 August 2022 v Netherlands
- Last ODI: 14 November 2025 v Sri Lanka
- T20I debut (cap 96): 28 August 2022 v India
- Last T20I: 28 February 2026 v Sri Lanka

Domestic team information
- Years: Team
- 2018/19: Zarai Taraqiati Bank
- 2019/20-2023: Central Punjab
- 2019–2023: Quetta Gladiators (squad no. 71 previously 16)
- 2021: St Kitts & Nevis Patriots
- 2022: Gloucestershire
- 2023: Leicestershire
- 2024–2025: Islamabad United (squad no. 71)
- 2025-present: Desert Vipers
- 2026: Rawalpindiz (squad no. 71)

Career statistics
| Competition | Test | ODI | T20I | FC |
|---|---|---|---|---|
| Matches | 20 | 34 | 39 | 38 |
| Runs scored | 144 | 234 | 62 | 273 |
| Batting average | 7.57 | 22.40 | 6.88 | 7.80 |
| 100s/50s | 0/0 | 0/1 | 0/0 | 0/0 |
| Top score | 33 | 51 | 16 | 33 |
| Balls bowled | 3,411 | 1,701 | 828 | 5,745 |
| Wickets | 60 | 60 | 35 | 126 |
| Bowling average | 35.13 | 25.91 | 32.02 | 27.16 |
| 5 wickets in innings | 1 | 2 | 0 | 5 |
| 10 wickets in match | 0 | 0 | 0 | 0 |
| Best bowling | 5/31 | 5/33 | 3/21 | 6/59 |
| Catches/stumpings | 5/– | 3/– | 4/– | 7/– |
Medal record
Men's Cricket
Representing Pakistan
T20 World Cup
| Runner-up | 2022 Australia |
Asia Cup
| Runner-up | 2022 UAE |
- Source: Cricinfo, 17 October 2026

Naseem Shah (Note: Pashto: نسیم شاه) (Pashto: [nəsɪm ʃɑh]; born 15 February 2003) is a Pakistani international cricketer. In October 2019, at the age of 16, he was called up to the Pakistan cricket team for their Test series against Australia. He made his international debut for Pakistan in November 2019 against Australia, becoming the ninth-youngest player to make his debut in Test cricket. In December 2019, in the second Test match against Sri Lanka, he became the second youngest bowler to take a five-wicket haul in a Test match, and also the youngest pace bowler to do so. In February 2020, in the first Test against Bangladesh, he became the youngest bowler to take a hat-trick in a Test match.

== Early and personal life ==
Naseem hails from Mayar Jandool, a town in the Lower Dir district of Khyber Pakhtunkhwa province, Pakistan and was born into a Pashtun family. He is fluent in Pashto and Urdu.

His father, Abbas Shah, was against his decision to play cricket, preferring him to concentrate on his studies. Naseem eventually completed his education to the tenth grade following which his father wanted him to seek employment abroad. His mother died in 2019, just a day before his Test debut at the age of 16.

He has two sisters and four brothers, including Hunain Shah, his younger brother, who is a fast bowler playing at first-class level. Their youngest brother, Ubaid Shah, also a fast bowler, made his Under-19 debut in October 2023 was selected for the Under-19 Asia Cup in December 2023, and played for the Pakistan U19 cricket team at the 2024 U19 World Cup.

In February 2023, Naseem Shah was given the honorary rank of Deputy Superintendent of Police (DSP) in the Balochistan Police, with high-level officials in attendance in Quetta. He expressed pride in being an ambassador for the province and pledged to represent it.

== Early career ==
After playing tape ball cricket for a few years in Lower Dir, Naseem began his professional journey at the age of 13 when his uncle enrolled him in the Abdul Qadir Cricket Academy in Lahore, where he would be coached by Sulaman Qadir, before getting selected for the Lahore Under-16 team at the age of 13 and later for the Pakistan Under-16 team at the age of 14.

== Domestic career ==
He made his first-class debut for Zarai Taraqiati Bank Limited in the 2018–19 Quaid-e-Azam Trophy on 1 September 2018. He made his List A debut for Zarai Taraqiati Bank Limited in the 2018–19 Quaid-e-Azam One Day Cup on 16 October 2018.

In September 2019, he was named in Central Punjab's squad for the 2019–20 Quaid-e-Azam Trophy tournament. In October 2019, the Pakistan Cricket Board (PCB) named him as one of the six players to watch ahead of the 2019–20 National T20 Cup tournament. He made his Twenty20 debut on 13 October 2019, for Central Punjab in the 2019–20 National T20 Cup.

== Franchise career ==
=== PSL ===
Shah played for Quetta Gladiators from 2019 to 2023, in the Pakistan Super League. He was traded to Islamabad United before the 2024 season.

On 11 Feb 2026, the Rawalpindi franchise signed him for PKR 8.65 crore, making him the most expensive player in the first-ever Pakistan Super League auction.

=== Other leagues ===
On 15 September 2021, Naseem Shah took the crucial two wickets in the final of the 2021 Caribbean Premier League (CPL), which helped st Kitts and Nevis Patriots register their first CPL title.

In January 2022, he was signed by Gloucestershire County Cricket Club to play in domestic tournaments during the first half of the 2022 season in England. In April 2022, he was bought by the Welsh Fire for the 2022 season of The Hundred, also in England. However, Shah was ruled out of matches for a month, after picking up a shoulder injury in his first match for Gloucestershire.

== International career ==
In October 2019, he was named in Pakistan's Test squad for their series against Australia. In November 2019, he played in the three-day warm-up match for Pakistan against Australia A. He made his Test debut for Pakistan, against Australia, on 21 November 2019. His debut was appreciated by many senior cricketers, such as former Pakistan fast bowler Waqar Younis and former England captain Michael Vaughan, the latter being impressed by the 16-year-old touching 147 km/h, or 91.3 mph, in his first ever over. Australian batsman David Warner praised Naseem's pace, control, and aggression after the teenager repeatedly troubled him despite going wicketless in his debut innings, highlighted by a disallowed caught-behind dismissal due to a no-ball. Warner described Naseem as an exceptional talent capable of replicating the impact Mohammad Amir had early in his career.

In December 2019, he was named in Pakistan's Test squad for the two-match series against Sri Lanka. In the second match, he took his first five-wicket haul in Test cricket. At the age of 16 years and 307 days, he became the youngest fast bowler, and the second-youngest among all bowlers, to take a five-wicket haul in a Test match.

He was initially named in Pakistan's squad for the 2020 Under-19 Cricket World Cup, but after his impressive start in Test cricket, he was withdrawn from the U19 team. In January 2020, the Pakistan Cricket Board (PCB) issued a statement on Naseem being withdrawn from their U19 squad. They reiterated that it was due to cricketing reasons, and not concerns about his age, stating they have checked and verified the ages of all cricketers who could play in their U19 team.

On 9 February 2020, in the first Test against Bangladesh, at the age of 16 years and 359 days, he became the youngest bowler to take a Test hat-trick. In May 2020, the PCB awarded him a central contract ahead of the 2020–21 season.

In June 2020, he was named in a 29-man squad for Pakistan's tour to England during the COVID-19 pandemic. In July, he was shortlisted for Pakistan's 20-man squad for the Test matches against England. On 21 August, he was named in Pakistan's Twenty20 International (T20I) squad, also for the series against England. In November 2020, he was named in Pakistan's 35-man squad for their tour to New Zealand. In October 2021, he was named in the Pakistan Shaheens squad for their tour of Sri Lanka.

In August 2022, he was named in Pakistan's ODI squad, for their tour of the Netherlands. He made his ODI debut on 16 August 2022, for Pakistan, against the Netherlands. During the last ODI, Naseem took his maiden wicket in ODIs.

Later the same month, he was named in Pakistan's T20I squad for the 2022 Asia Cup. He made his T20I debut on 28 August 2022, against India.

On 7 September 2022, Naseem Shah made history by delivering 2 sixes against Afghanistan to save Pakistan from a defeat and help qualify for the finals.

In September 2022, he was named in Pakistan's T20I squad for England's tour of Pakistan. In October 2022, Naseem was named in Pakistan's T20I squad for the Tri-Series in New Zealand. Later in October, Naseem was named in Pakistan's T20I squad for the 2022 ICC Men's T20 World Cup. He had a proficient run in the World Cup and helped Pakistan qualify for the 2022 ICC Men's T20 World Cup Final, but lost it.

In November 2022, he was named in Pakistan's Test squad for England's tour of Pakistan. After the first match, Naseem suffered a shoulder injury that ruled him out of the series.

In December 2022, he was named in Pakistan's Test squad for New Zealand's tour of Pakistan and later in the ODI squad in January 2023. In the first ODI against New Zealand, Naseem took his second fifer in ODIs and a consecutive fifer.

In September, he was ruled out of 2023 World Cup due to an injury.

In May 2024, he was named in Pakistan's squad for the 2024 ICC Men's T20 World Cup tournament.

== Playing style ==
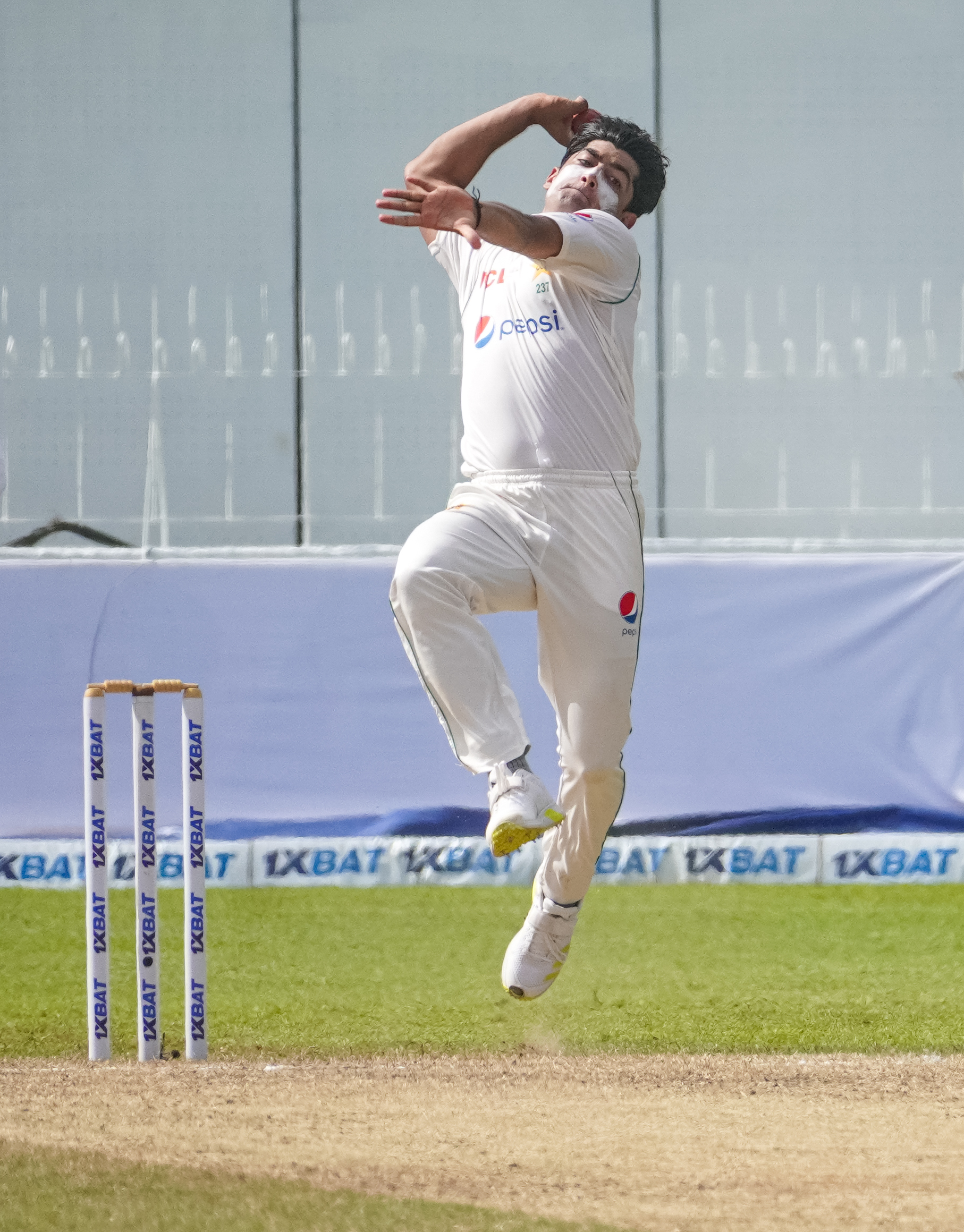
Shah during his bowling action

In February 2020, ESPNcricinfo journalist Osman Samiuddin wrote a reflective piece on Naseem Shah's emergence, praising the technical precision of his bowling action. Samiuddin noted that Naseem's mechanics evoked shades of former New Zealand internationals Richard Hadlee and Shane Bond, highlighting the measured run-up, the compact alignment at the crease, and the assertive follow-through. He described the action as unusually complete for a teenager, "as ready and beautiful as a butterfly at birth", suggesting an innate fluency rather than something molded over years of coaching.
