= Pakistan national cricket team =

National sports team

Pakistan
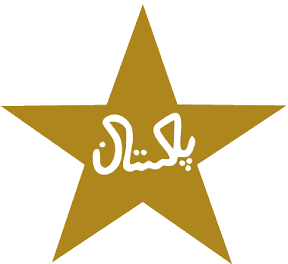
- Nickname(s): Shaheens (lit. 'Falcons'); Green Shirts; Men in Green; Cornered Tigers
- Association: Pakistan Cricket Board

Personnel
- Test captain: Babar Azam
- One Day captain: Shaheen Afridi
- T20I captain: Sahibzada Farhan
- Coach: Mike Hesson

History
- Test status acquired: 1952 (74 years ago)

International Cricket Council
- ICC status: Full Member (1952)
- ICC region: Asia
ICC Rankings	Current	Best-ever
Test	7th	1st (22 August 2016)
ODI	4th	1st (2 May 2023)
T20I	7th	1st (1 November 2017)

Tests
- First Test: v India at the Feroz Shah Kotla Ground, Delhi; 16–18 October 1952
- Last Test: v Sri Lanka at Rawalpindi Cricket Stadium, Rawalpindi; 17–20 November 2026
Tests	Played	Won/Lost
Total	476	154/155 (167 draws)
This year	9	2/6 (1 draw)
- World Test Championship appearances: 3 (first in 2021)
- Best result: 6th place (2021)

One Day Internationals
- First ODI: v New Zealand at Lancaster Park, Christchurch; 11 February 1973
- Last ODI: v Sri Lanka at Gaddafi Stadium, Lahore; 31 October 2026
ODIs	Played	Won/Lost
Total	1,007	533/444 (9 ties, 21 no results)
This year	11	7/4 (0 ties, 0 no results)
- World Cup appearances: 12 (first in 1975)
- Best result: Champions (1992)

T20 Internationals
- First T20I: v England at the Bristol County Ground, Bristol; 28 August 2006
- Last T20I: v Sri Lanka at Rawalpindi Cricket Stadium, Rawalpindi; 13 October 2026
T20Is	Played	Won/Lost
Total	304	176/116 (4 ties, 8 no results)
This year	17	11/5 (0 ties, 1 no results)
- T20 World Cup appearances: 8 (first in 2007)
- Best result: Champions (2009)
Test kit
ODI kit
T20I kit
- As of 20 November 2026

The Pakistan men's national cricket team represents Pakistan in international cricket. It is controlled by the Pakistan Cricket Board (PCB), the governing body for cricket in Pakistan, which is a Full Member of the International Cricket Council (ICC). Pakistan compete in cricket tours and tournaments sanctioned by the PCB and other regional or international cricket bodies in Test, One Day International (ODI), and Twenty20 International (T20) formats.

Pakistan were given Test status in 1952 following a recommendation from India, but faced limited international success until the 1980s, when they became fixtures in the latter stages of tournaments. They won their first international trophy, the ICC World Cup, in 1992, and then won the Asia Cup in 2000. They saw increased success in the 21st century, winning the T20 World Cup in 2009, the Asia Cup in 2012, and ICC Champions Trophy in 2017.

Pakistan has been plagued by security concerns and domestic instability due to terrorism and the war on terror, restricting it as a venue for international cricket in the 21st century. Despite hosting the 1987 and 1996 World Cups (with the 1996 final played in Lahore), cricket was not played in the country after an attack against the Sri Lanka national team in 2009; Pakistan then played one-day games in the United Arab Emirates until 2016 and Test games in the UAE until 2019. International cricket was resumed in Pakistan from 2016, which coincided with the debut of the Pakistan Super League, following improvements in security and overall reduction in terrorism.

== History ==
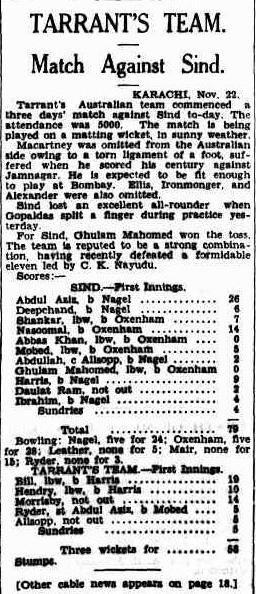
The match held between Sindh(Called then as Sind) & Australia in Karachi on 22 November 1935 was reported by The Sydney Morning Herald

Cricket in Pakistan has a history predating the creation of the country in 1947. The first ever international cricket match in Karachi was held on 22 November 1935 between Sindh and Australian cricket teams. The match was seen by 5,000 Karachiites. Ghulam Mohammad was the captain of team Sind and Frank Tarrant was the captain of Tarrant's team. Following the independence of Pakistan in 1947, cricket in the country developed rapidly and Pakistan was given Test match status at a meeting of the Imperial Cricket Conference at Lord's in England on 28 July 1952 following recommendation by India, which, being the successor state of the British Raj, did not have to go through such a process. The first captain of the Pakistan national cricket team was Abdul Hafeez Kardar.

Pakistan's first Test match was played in Delhi in October 1952 as part of a five Test series which India won 2–1. Pakistan made their first tour of England in 1954 and drew the series 1–1 after a victory at The Oval in which fast bowler Fazal Mahmood took 12 wickets. Pakistan's first home Test match was against India in January 1955 at Bangabandhu National Stadium, Dacca, East Pakistan (now Bangladesh), after which four more Test matches were played in Bahawalpur, Lahore, Peshawar and Karachi (all five matches in the series were drawn, the first such occurrence in Test history).

The team is considered a strong but unpredictable team. Traditionally Pakistani cricket has been composed of talented players but is alleged to display limited discipline on occasion, making their performance inconsistent at times. In particular, the India-Pakistan cricket rivalry is usually emotionally charged and can provide for intriguing contests, as talented teams and players from both teams of the border seek to elevate their game to new levels. Pakistan team contests with India in the Cricket World Cup have resulted in packed stadiums and highly charged atmospheres. The team is well supported at home and abroad, especially in the United Kingdom where British Pakistanis have formed a fan-club called the "Stani Army". Members of the club show up to matches across the country and are known to provide raucous support. The Stani Army also takes part in charity initiatives for underprivileged Pakistanis, including annual friendly cricket matches against British Indian members of the similar "Bharat Army".

== Test cricket ==
Pakistan's first Test match was played in Delhi in October 1952 as part of a five Test series. They lost the first test by an innings and 70 runs. India scored 372 runs in their first innings and Pakistan managed 302 runs in combined both innings. However, it just took seven days to turn things around for the Pakistani's. In second Test match, Pakistan blew India away for 106 before Pakistan, with the help of Hanif Mohammad's 124, scored 331 in their first innings, taking a lead of 225. India were bowled out for 182, giving Pakistan a win by an innings and 43 runs. It was Fazal Mahmood's game as he took 12/94. India won the next match by 10 wickets before the final two test were drawn, which resulted India winning series 2–1.

Pakistan made their first tour of England in 1954 and drew the series 1–1 after a victory at The Oval in which fast bowler Fazal Mahmood took 12 wickets. Pakistan's first home Test match was against India in January 1955 at Bangabandhu National Stadium, Dacca, East Pakistan (now Bangladesh), after which four more Test matches were played in Bahawalpur, Lahore, Peshawar and Karachi (all five matches in the series were drawn, the first such occurrence in Test history). In the same year, New Zealand toured Pakistan for their first series against them. They defeated New Zealand by an innings and 1 run in the first test and won the second test match by 4 wickets. The final test ended in a draw, resulting in Pakistan's first ever Test series win, with 2–0 margin.

In 1956 Australia toured Pakistan and played one test, which Pakistan won. They bowled Australia out for 80 in their first innings. Pakistan took a lead of 119 runs when they were dismissed at 199. Pakistan bowled Australia out for 187 in the second innings, giving the hosts a target of 68. Pakistan won comfortably by 9 wickets. Again, Fazal Mahmood was the chief destroyer, taking 13/114 in the match.

Pakistan visited West Indies in 1958 for a five-test series. Pakistan drew the first test. It was Hanif Mohammad's match as he saved Pakistan after they were bowled out for 106 in reply to West Indies' first innings of 579. Trailing by 473, Mohammad played the longest test match innings – a marathon 970 minutes for his match-saving 337. The next three tests went in West Indies' favour before Pakistan won their first match against them by an innings and 1 run. In that match, it was another Mohammad performance. This time it was Hanif's brother Wazir Mohammad who scored 189 out of Pakistan's 496 in reply to the hosts' 268. West Indies were bowled out for 227 in their second innings but the series went to them by 3–1.

=== Performance during the 1970s till the 1990s ===
From 1970 to 1979, Pakistan played over 13 Test series, which they won 3, lost 5 and drew 5. In total of 41 Test matches, Pakistan won 6, lost 12 and drew 23. They had a below par performance. But from 1980 to 1989, they did better. Out of 21 Test series they have played from that period, they won 9, lost 5 and drew 7. In terms of matches, they played total of 72 matches, winning 20 and losing 12 with 40 draws. In 1987, Pakistan went to India for five match series. It was Sunil Gavaskar's last test series. The first four test went draw but the final match was thriller. Pakistan scored 116 before India scored 145. Pakistan came back with 249 on board, giving the host a target of 220. India fell 16 runs short and the series was considered one of the best India-Pakistan series. In 1988, after West Indies tour where they drew 1–1 (3), Pakistan were rated as No.1 Test team. It was one of greatest moments in their history.

From 1990 to 1999, Pakistan did even better. They played 29 series, winning over 15 and losing 9 with 5 drawn. In terms of matches, they played 74, winning 40, losing 21 and drawing 13. In this period, the lowest point of for Pakistan came in 1998 where they lost to Zimbabwe 1–0 in three match series. The biggest moment came in Asian Test Championship in 1998 where they defeated Sri Lanka in the final by an innings and 175 runs.

=== 21st century ===
In 2002, Pakistan participated in their second Asian Test Championship. It was originally planned to include all four Asian ICC full-members (Bangladesh, India, Pakistan and Sri Lanka). However, before the tournament started, India's participation was put in doubt. After defeating Bangladesh in the 1st Test to meet Sri Lanka in the final, they were defeated by them by 8 wickets.

A major controversy occurred in 2006 when the team toured England for a four-match Test series. England led the series 2–0 going into the final Test. In the first innings of that match, they were bowled out for 173 and Pakistan scored 504 in reply. In the second innings, after the dismissal of Alastair Cook for 83 off a reverse-swinging from Umar Gul, umpires Darrell Hair and Billy Doctrove called a halt to play as they adjudged Pakistan to be guilty of ball tampering. The ball was replaced and England was awarded 5 penalty runs. This event was the catalyst for the subsequent refusal to continue the match after tea by the Pakistan team. Based on the Laws of Cricket, the umpires declared Pakistan to have forfeited the game. The ICC later changed the result of the match to a draw, and subsequently reinstated the original result on 1 February 2009.

=== 2010 spot-fixing scandal ===
The Pakistan cricket team toured England from 29 July to 22 September 2010. The tour consisted of four Tests, two T20Is and five ODIs. During the Test series, Pakistan lost the first two Test by 354 runs and 9 wickets. They came back to win the third Test by 4 wickets. However, in the fourth Test, the spot-fixing took place. On the third day of the 4th Test, British newspaper News of the World published a story with allegations that an agent loosely affiliated with some of the Pakistani players (later identified as Mazhar Majeed) had accepted a £150,000 (US$232,665) bribe from undercover reporters for information that two Pakistani bowlers (Mohammad Asif and Mohammad Amir) would deliberately deliver no balls at specific points during the match. The third player was also caught. It was Pakistan's Test skipper Salman Butt, who was revealed to be the master mind of this case. On 1 November 2011, Asif, Amir, and Butt were found guilty for their part in the spot-fixing and were given prison sentences, ranging from six months to 30 months and now Amir played well.

=== Under Misbah-ul-Haq ===
After Amir, Asif and Butt were dismissed, Pakistan made Misbah ul Haq the new captain of Pakistan. In subsequent series against South Africa in the UAE he led Pakistan in tests. After resignation of Shahid Afridi as test captain and suspension of Salman Butt due to spot-fixing scandal, Misbah was preferred over Younus Khan, Mohammad Yousuf and Kamran Akmal as captain. Wasim Akram stated that although the decision was surprising, if Misbah bats and fields well everything else will go according to plan.

Former Pakistan coach Geoff Lawson stated that he believed Misbah has the best cricketing brain within Pakistan and he will do incredibly well in the plans for the captaincy Misbah hit back at those who criticised the decision to appoint him captain and stated that he should be given a chance to prove himself.

In Misbah's first series against South Africa in UAE 2010, he led the two match Test series to draw 0–0. Later the team toured New Zealand where they won two match Test series 1–0. Pakistan also went to West Indies and Zimbabwe for two Match and lone Test match. They drew 1–1 and won 1–0 over West Indies and Zimbabwe respectively. They also won against the touring Sri Lankan team, winning 1–0 (3) and whitewashed Bangladesh 2–0 (2).

One of the most biggest moment for Pakistan under Misbah's captaincy was when they whitewashed England, the then no.1 team, who toured UAE in early 2012. Mohsin Khan, the Pakistan coach, compared his team's whitewash against England to the 1992 Cricket World Cup triumph. "Today is like a dream come true," Mohsin told Sky Sports. "It's not a very experienced team but it's very talented. Today, the captain and all the players have proved they are one of the best in the world. It's a great achievement for the Pakistan team."

Against the South Africa cricket team in 2013 tour, they were badly whitewashed by the Proteas by 3–0 (3). In first Test, they were bowled out for 49, the worst in their history. That was considered to be worst performance against top team. At the same year, they also got their second defeat to Zimbabwe when Pakistan toured for two match Test series. The series was drawn 1–1. In early 2014, against Sri Lanka who toured UAE for 3 match series, Pakistan were down 1–0 after two match. In the final match, the first four days went nowhere until the early fifth day when Pakistan managed to bowl out the Sri Lankan cricket team for 214 and were asked to chase 301 in last two and a half session. Pakistan chased it down in 57.3 overs, the fastest chase in Test cricket history.

Another greatest performance from Pakistan is when they whitewashed the touring Australian cricket team. After beating Pakistan 1–0 in T20Is and 3–0 in ODIs, Pakistan were doubtful to win a two match Test series against the tourist. However, Pakistan won the matches by 221 runs and 356 runs. The win in the second Test was their highest winning margin against any opposition in their history. Also in the same match, Misbah equaled the then fastest Test match century off 56 deliveries.

Against New Zealand, who toured Pakistan for 3 Test match series. After winning the first Test, Misbah became Pakistan's most successful Test captain win 15 wins, taking over Imran Khan and Javed Miandad's joint 14 win record. The series went to draw 1–1 (3).

Another moment for Pakistan under Misbah was when Pakistan toured Sri Lanka and defeated them in three match Test series. There, it was the first time Pakistan defeat Sri Lanka in Sri Lanka after 9 years. And when England toured UAE for three match Test series, Pakistan defeated them 2–0 (3). As a result, they climbed to No.2 in Test rankings, also after 9 years.

=== Rise to No.1 in Tests ===
In 2016, Pakistan became No.1 Test team after their tour of England, where they drew series 2–2 (4). It was the first time since the ranking system were introduced, they were crowned No.1 and first time since 1988. It was another great achievement in Pakistan's Test history. They were also given Test mace in Lahore. However, their No.1 rank was short-lived, as their downfall began. After winning the series against the West Indies 2–1 (3) in UAE, Pakistan toured New Zealand and Australia for two match and three match Test series. They lost all five matches plus one lost against West Indies. They were down at No.5 in rankings. Misbah was considering retirement after the Australia tour but stayed till West Indies tour, saying he had 'one last job to do'.

Despite having major upsets in the southern continent, Pakistan were triumphant in the West Indies tour of 2017, having won the T20 series 3–1, the ODI series by 2–1, and winning a thriller in the 3rd test to seal it 2–1. This was Pakistan's first ever test series win in the Caribbean. Misbah-ul-Haq and Younus Khan retired after, with the captaincy going to Sarfaraz Ahmed.

== White ball cricket (ODIs and T20Is) ==
=== 1986 Austral-Asia Cup (Champions) ===
The 1986 Austral-Asia Cup, played in Sharjah in UAE, saw a last-ball victory for Pakistan against their arch-rivals India, with Javed Miandad emerging as a national hero. India batted first and set a target of 245 runs, leaving Pakistan with a required run rate of 4.92 runs per over. Miandad came in to bat at number 3 and Pakistan lost wickets at regular intervals. Later recalling the match, he stated that his main focus was to lose with dignity. With 31 runs needed in the last three overs, Miandad hit a string of boundaries while batting with his team's lower order, until four runs were required from the last delivery of the match. Miandad received a leg side full toss from Chetan Sharma, which he hit for six over the midwicket boundary.

=== 1992 Cricket World Cup (Champions) ===
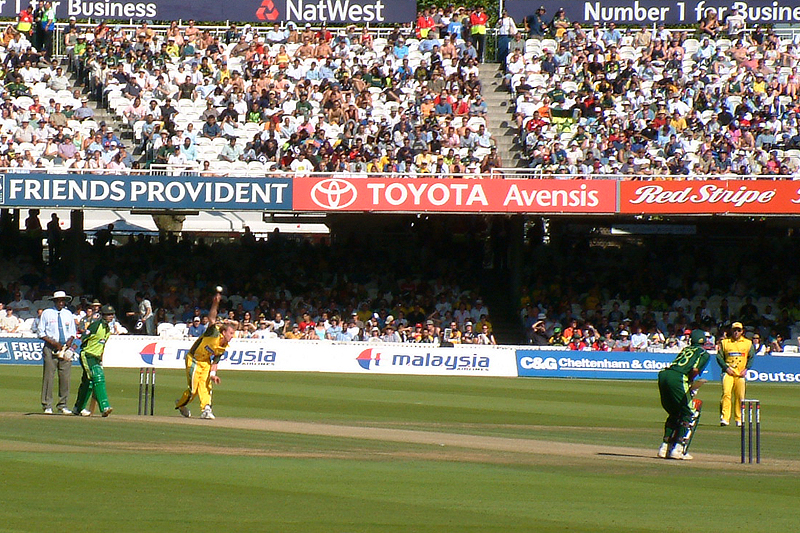
Pakistani opener Yasir Hameed playing against Australia at Lord's in England

At the 1992 World Cup Semi-final, having won the toss, New Zealand chose to bat first and ended with a total of 262 runs. Pakistan batted conservatively yet lost wickets at regular intervals. With the departure of Imran Khan and Saleem Malik shortly thereafter, Pakistan still required 115 runs at a rate of 7.67 runs per over with veteran Javed Miandad being the only known batsman remaining at the crease. A young Inzamam-ul-Haq, who had just turned 22 and was not a well-known player at the time, burst onto the international stage with a match-winning 60 off 37 balls. Once Inzamam got out, Pakistan required 36 runs from 30 balls, which wicket-keeper Moin Khan ended with a towering six over long off, followed by the winning boundary to midwicket. The match is seen as the emergence of Inzamam onto the international stage.

The 1992 Cricket World Cup in Australia and New Zealand marked Pakistan's first World Cup victory. It is remembered for the comeback Pakistan made after losing key players such as Waqar Younis and Saeed Anwar and being led by an injured captain Imran Khan. Pakistan lost 3 of their first 5 matches and were nearly eliminated in the first round of the tournament after being bowled out for 74 runs against England, until the match was declared as a "no result" due to rain. Imran Khan told the team to play like "cornered tigers", after which Pakistan won five successive matches, including the semi-final against hosts New Zealand and the final against England.

=== 2007 Cricket World Cup ===
The 2007 Cricket World Cup was one of the biggest upsets in World Cup history when Pakistan was knocked out of the competition in a shock defeat to Ireland, who were playing in their first competition. Pakistan, needing to win to qualify for the next stage after losing to the West Indies in their opening match, were put into bat by Ireland. They lost wickets regularly and only 4 batsmen scored double figures. In the end they were bowled out by the Irish for 132 runs. The Irish went on to win the match, after Niall O'Brien scored 72 runs. This meant that Pakistan had been knocked out during the first round for the second consecutive World Cup. Tragedy struck the team when coach Bob Woolmer died one day later on 18 March 2007 in a hospital in Kingston, Jamaica. Jamaican police spokesman Karl Angell reported on 23 March 2007 that, "Mr Woolmer's death was due to asphyxiation as a result of manual strangulation" and that, "Mr Woolmer's death is now being treated by the Jamaica police as a case of murder." Assistant coach Mushtaq Ahmed acted as temporary coach for the team's final group game of the tournament. Subsequent to his team's defeat and the death of Woolmer, Inzamam-ul-Haq announced his resignation as captain of the team and his retirement from one-day cricket, stating that he would continue to take part in Test cricket but not as captain. Shoaib Malik was announced as his successor. Following his return to the squad, Salman Butt was appointed as vice-captain until December 2007.

On 23 March 2007, Pakistan players and officials were questioned by Jamaican police and submitted DNA samples along with fingerprints, as part of the routine enquiries in the investigation into Woolmer's murder. Three days after leaving the West Indies for Pakistan, via London, the Pakistan team were ruled out as suspects. The deputy commissioner of Jamaican police. Mark Shields, the detective in charge of the investigation, announced, "It's fair to say they are now being treated as witnesses." "I have got no evidence to suggest it was anybody in the squad." A memorial service was held in Sacred Heart Church, Lahore, for Bob Woolmer on 1 April 2007. Among the attendees were Pakistan players and dignitaries, including Inzamam-ul-Haq, who was quoted as saying, "After Woolmer's family, the Pakistan team was the most aggrieved by his death." After the World Cup ended, serious doubts were raised about the investigation, with increasing speculation that Woolmer died of natural causes. This has now been accepted as fact, and the case has been closed.

On 20 April 2007, a PCB official announced that former Test cricketer Talat Ali would act as interim coach, in addition to his rôle as team manager, until a new coach had been appointed. On 16 July 2007, Geoff Lawson, previously head coach of New South Wales, was appointed coach of Pakistan for two years, becoming the third foreigner to take on the rôle. In the 2007 ICC World Twenty20, Pakistan exceeded expectations to reach the final but ended as runners-up, after losing the final to India in a nail-biting finish. On 25 October 2008, Intikhab Alam was named as a national coach of the team by the PCB.

=== 2009 ICC World T20 (Champions) ===
In the final at Lord's, the home of cricket in London, Sri Lanka won the toss and elected to bat. The first over was bowled by Mohammad Amir. After failing to score off the first four balls – all short – Dilshan went for his scoop and mistimed it, resulting in him being caught at short fine-leg. Soon after this, Jehan Mubarak top-edged a delivery by Abdul Razzaq which went high in the air and was caught by Shahzaib Hasan, leaving Sri Lanka at 2 for 2. Sanath Jayasuriya was able to stabilise the innings for Sri Lanka hitting 17 runs off 10 balls, however, Jayasuriya soon fell as he dragged a good length ball back on to the stumps. Mahela Jayawardene followed after edging a shot into the hands of Misbah-ul-Haq, leaving Sri Lanka on 32/4. Sangakkara and Chamara Silva added further runs before the latter was caught by Saeed Ajmal playing a pull shot off the bowling of Umar Gul. Shahid Afridi soon after, took the wicket of Isuru Udana with a googly which drifted into the right-hander, knocking the off-stump. This brought in Angelo Mathews, who along with Sangakkara took the score from 70/6 to 138/6, with 17 runs being scored off the last over bowled by Mohammad Amir. Sri Lanka finished on 138/6 from 20 overs.

Pakistan started off well with openers Kamran Akmal and Shahzaib Hasan adding 48 runs for the 1st wicket before Kamran Akmal was stumped by Kumar Sangakkara by the first delivery of Sanath Jayasuriya. Pakistan reached the target in 18.4 overs, with Shahid Afridi, who hit the winning runs, earning Man of the Match while Tillakaratne Dilshan was declared Man of the Series for his 317 runs at an average of 63.40. Pakistan's win often cheered on by crowds of fans from England's Pakistani communities, marked its first world title since Imran Khan's "cornered tigers" had won the 1992 World Cup."We all know how important this World Cup was with so much happening in Pakistan," Afridi said. "The guys motivated themselves for this World Cup."

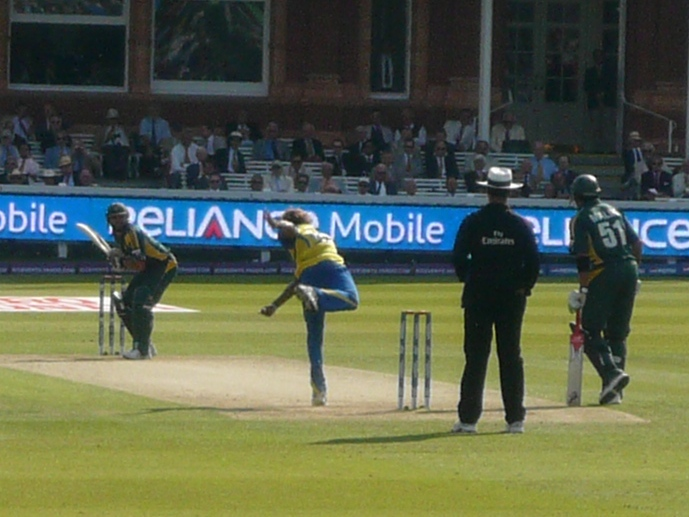
Shahid Afridi batting against Sri Lanka in the ICC World Twenty20 Final at Lord's in England

Afridi had a quiet start to the tournament with the bat but responded strongly with match-winning half-centuries in the semi-final and final. He also took 11 wickets in the tournament.

He said the support staff, including the head coach Intikhab Alam and bowling coach Aaqib Javed, played a role in shaping the team's victory.

"They all really worked hard with the guys and kept them united and close to each other, that's why we had success," Afridi said. Shahid Afridi was the man who won the heart of people of Pakistan

=== 2010 ICC World T20 (Semi-finalists) ===
The 2010 World T20 was held in West Indies, where Pakistan was able to reach for the semi-final stage. Pakistan, Australia and Bangladesh were in Group A. Pakistan won the first match against Bangladesh by 21 runs. Salman Butt became the hero of the match with his 73 runs from just 46 balls. The second match for Pakistan was with Australia, where Australia won the toss and elected to bat. They scored 191/10 with 49 ball 81 runs by Shane Watson. In this match, final over of Australian innings was bowled by Mohammad Amir. He took a triple-wicket maiden and there were two run-outs, and eventually five wickets fell in the final over of Australia's innings.

In Super 8s stage, Pakistan lost to England, and New Zealand, only won against South Africa. They finished only behind England in Group E of Super 8s, reached to the semi-finals The semi-final for Pakistan was again with Australia, where they scored 191/6 with Umar Akmal's not out 56 runs. Australia had a good start, where Michael Hussey scored a match winning unbeaten 64 runs from just 24 balls. Australia scored 197/7 in 19.5 overs and won the match. With this match, Pakistan lost their defended World T20 title.

=== 2011 Cricket World Cup (Semi-finalists) ===
Pakistan started well in the ICC Cricket World Cup, which was held in India, Sri Lanka and Bangladesh, after beating Kenya, Sri Lanka (one of the tournament favourites) and bye a margin, beating Canada. Shahid Afridi clearly stated that his team is capable of qualifying for the Semifinals. After a huge loss against New Zealand, Pakistan defeated Zimbabwe by 7 wickets. After victory against Zimbabwe Pakistan cemented their shot at playing the ICC CWC 2011 Quarters. One of the highlights of the tournament for Pakistan was when they beat Australia, who were led by 3 brilliant pace bowlers, Brett Lee, Shaun Tait and Mitchell Johnson. However Pakistan defied the odds and defeated Australia, courtesy of a brilliant bowling display. This saw Australia's record win streak of 27 consecutive world cup games broken which saw them win every game between the 1999 world cup up until this game. In the quarter-finals they played West Indies. Pakistan were ruthless, as they emphatically won against the West Indies team by 10 wickets, due to another brilliant bowling display. In the semi-finals on 30 March, Pakistan had a match with its fiercest rival, India. India managed 260 after they batted first. Not having a good batting line-up along with a slow start to the chase, Pakistan were 29 runs short as India reached the final (India went on to win the final, by defeating Sri Lanka).

=== 2012 ICC World T20 (Semi-finalists) ===
The 2012 edition of World T20 was held in Sri Lanka, where Pakistan grouped in Group D with New Zealand, and Bangladesh. They won comfortably against the two teams, and stood up as top of group D. In super eight contest, Pakistan first played against South Africa, where Pakistan won the match by just 2 wickets. next match was against India, which always given a much publicity by all over the fans. Pakistan bowled out for just 128 runs, where India reached the target with only 2 wickets given. Pakistan won their last Super eight match against Australia by 32 runs, where Saeed Ajmal performed well in the match by taking 3 wickets for 17 runs. Pakistan qualified for the semi-finals after superior net run rate than India.

The Pakistan semi-final was with the host-Sri Lanka. Sri Lanka scored 139/ with Mahela Jayawardena took the gear. Pakistan nearly chased the target, but wickets in crucial interval gave them backward. Skipper Mohammad Hafeez scored 42 runs and all the other batsmen not going well. The match was turned towards Sri Lanka with magical spell by Rangana Herath, who took wickets of Mohammad Hafeez, Shahid Afridi and Shoaib Malik. Pakistan lost the match by 16 runs.

=== 2014 ICC World T20 ===
The 2014 ICC World T20 was held by Bangladesh. The Pakistani team was in Bangladesh prior to the World T20, due to 2014 Asia Cup, which was held by Bangladesh. Pakistan played for the Group 2, with mighty oppositions. The tournament was a disappointing one for the Pakistanis, where they won 2 and lost 2, finished the group as third and disqualified for the semi-finals.

The first group match was with rivals India, which India won by 7 wickets. The next match was against Australia, where Pakistan scored 191/5 with brilliant batting of Umar Akmal. Australia had a fierce going with 33 ball 74 runs by Glenn Maxwell, but only managed to score 175. Pakistan won the match by 16 runs. The match against Bangladesh was a comfortable win by 50 runs. Pakistani opening batsman Ahmed Shehzad scored the maiden T20I century by a Pakistani. He finished with an unbeaten 111 off 62 balls. The crucial match was with West Indies, where the winning team would go through to the semi-final. West Indies won the toss and elected to bat first. They scored 166/6 in their 20 overs, West Indies scored 82 runs off the last 5 overs giving a fearsome hitting to the Pakistani bowlers. Pakistan's chase was unsuccessful as they were bowled out for just 82 runs. Pakistan was knocked out from the tournament with this result.

=== 2015 Cricket World Cup (Quarter-finalists) ===
Pakistan started poorly in the 2015 Cricket World Cup. Their first match was against cricket rivals — India. India batted first and scored 300/7 with Virat Kohli scoring a century. After a poor start to the run chase, Pakistan's skipper Misbah-ul-Haq made a useful contribution of 76 runs but Pakistan lost the match by 76 runs. The second match against West Indies was a disaster. West Indies posted 310/6 on the board. In response, Pakistan lost 4 wickets for 1 run on the board, a first in an ODI match. The team was bowled out for 160 and lost the match by 150 runs.

Pakistan then won their next four games against Zimbabwe, UAE, South Africa and Ireland. Sarfaraz Ahmed scored Pakistan's only century against Ireland and was awarded Player of the Match against both South Africa and Ireland. The victory was Pakistan's first against South Africa in a World Cup match. Pakistan finished third in group B and qualified for the quarterfinals.

The quarterfinal match of Pakistan was against Australia. Pakistan scored 213 runs. Australia started steadily but wickets regularly fell during the middle overs. The match gained a lot of attraction due to the on-field rivalry between Australian all-rounder, Shane Watson and Pakistani pacer, Wahab Riaz. Wahab's spell was praised despite not picking up many wickets. Pakistan dropped catches during the first power-play and conceded many runs. The partnership between Steve Smith and Glenn Maxwell allowed Australia to win the match. As a result, Pakistan were knocked out of the tournament. The match was the final ODI for Pakistani's captain Misbah-ul-Haq and experienced all-rounder Shahid Afridi.

=== After 2015 Cricket World Cup ===
After the 2015 Cricket World Cup, Misbah-ul-Haq and Shahid Afridi ended their ODI careers. As a result, the captaincy of the ODI team was given to newcomer Azhar Ali. Under his captaincy, Pakistan played their first ODI series against Bangladesh. The tour was a disappointment and Pakistan lost all three ODIs as well as the T20 match. Clever bowling coupled with wonderful batting and fielding allowed the hosts to stroll past the visitors. This was Bangladesh's first win against Pakistan since the 1999 Cricket World Cup and first ever series win over Pakistan. However, Pakistan ended the tour on a positive with a 1–0 win in the two-match test series.

Pakistan played a home series against Zimbabwe in May 2015 after 6 years. This was the first tour by a Test-playing nation since the attack on the Sri Lankan cricket team in 2009. Pakistan won the T20I series 2–0 and the ODI series 2–0 after the third match ended in a draw due to rain. During the Sri Lanka tour in 2015, Pakistan won the Test series 2–1, the ODI series 3–2 and the T20I series 2–0. The successful tour allowed Pakistan to qualify for the 2017 ICC Champions Trophy, removing West Indies from a place in the tournament. The series win pushed up Pakistan's ranking in all three formats of the game.

In September, Pakistan travelled to Zimbabwe for 2 T20Is and 3 ODIs. Pakistan won the T20I series 2–0 and the ODI series 2–1. As a result, Pakistan concluded their 2015 season rankings as 4th in Tests, 8th in ODIs, and 2nd in T20Is.

=== 2017 ===
Misbah-ul-Haq and Younis Khan, who had been the mainstays of the Pakistani batting line-up, announced their retirements from Test cricket (the only format they played at that time) at the completion of the West Indies tour 2017. Pakistan won the T20I series 3–1 and the ODI series 2–1 in the same tour under the captaincy of Sarfaraz Ahmed. In his final Test series, Misbah made history by being the first Pakistani captain to win an away Test series against West Indies in West Indies. Sarfaraz Ahmed was announced as Misbah's successor. In his first series against Sri Lanka, who toured UAE, Pakistan lost both Test matches. It was first time in 10 years that Pakistan lost their home series, the first time they lost was against the Australian team and the first time in the UAE ever since it became Pakistan's adoptive home.

=== 2017 ICC Champions Trophy (Champions) ===
The tournament did not start well for Pakistan, losing to their arch-rivals India by 124 runs. But as the group stages progressed the bowling attack improved significantly for Pakistan, winning games against South Africa by 19 runs, and a crucial game against Sri Lanka by 3 wickets. This set up a semi-final against hosts and favourites England, where Hasan Ali took 3 wickets to take Pakistan to their first ICC Champions Trophy Final, a highly anticipated re-match with India.

In the final before a packed house at The Oval, India won the toss and elected to bowl first. Pakistan's batting lineup made India question their decision with opening batsman Fakhar Zaman scoring his maiden One Day International century (114 off 106 deliveries), with major contributions from Azhar Ali (59) and Mohammad Hafeez (57*) pushing Pakistan to a total of 338. India lost their top order quickly with Mohammad Amir getting the key wickets of Rohit Sharma, Shikhar Dhawan and Virat Kohli. Resistance came in the form of Hardik Pandya, who scored a brisk 76. Hasan Ali, Pakistan's star find in this tournament took the final wicket finishing with figures of 3–19, leaving India 180 runs short of the target and handing Pakistan their first Champions Trophy. The margin of victory was the largest in an ICC tournament final.

Hasan Ali was named as player of the tournament. Pakistan captain, Sarfaraz Ahmed stated (after the opening match against India) "I said to the boys, the tournament doesn't finish here. Good cricket, positive cricket and we will win". After Pakistan's victory, they moved up from 8th to 6th in the ICC ODI rankings. The ICC Team of the Tournament had Sarfaraz Ahmed as captain, Fakhar Zaman, Junaid Khan and Hasan Ali from Pakistan.

=== After the 2017 Champions Trophy ===
Pakistan participated in the 2019 Cricket World Cup in England where they finished fifth in the round robin group stage and narrowly missed out on the knockout stage. They reached the semi-finals of the 2021 ICC Men's T20 World Cup and the finals of the 2022 ICC Men's T20 World Cup, which they lost to champions England.

Pakistan participated in the 2022 Asian Games in China and the 2023 Cricket World Cup in India. On 5 October 2023, Pakistan became the first national team to play 2 international matches on the same day; vs Afghanistan in the Asian Games and vs Netherlands in the World Cup. They lost the match to Afghanistan to be pushed out of the gold medal match and play onward to the Bronze medal match; they won the World Cup match against Netherlands to progress in the World Cup.

Pakistan was defeated by Bangladesh in the Bronze Medal match to finish fourth in the 2022 Asian Games.

Pakistan finished 5th in the 2023 Cricket World Cup, losing 5 of their 9 matches and narrowly missing out on the semi finals.

== Governing body ==
The Pakistan Cricket Board (PCB) is responsible for all first class and Test cricket played in Pakistan and by the Pakistan cricket team. It was admitted to the International Cricket Council in July 1953. The corporation has been run by former cricketers, professional administrators and trustees, who are often respected businessmen. The Board governs a network of teams sponsored by corporations and banks, city associations and clubs including advertising, broadcasting rights and internet partners.

The PCB's experiment with the Twenty20 cricket model has also proven popular and hopes to similarly revive popular interest in domestic games, which it did. The PCB also set up major domestic competitions such as the Quaid-i-Azam Trophy, the Faysal Bank T20 Cup, the Pakistan Super League and the National Twenty20 Cup.

== Tournament history ==
A red box around the year indicates tournaments played within Pakistan

=== World Test Championship ===
ICC World Test Championship record
Year	League stage										Final Host	Final	Final Position
Year	Pos	Matches					Ded	PC	Pts	PCT	Final Host	Final	Final Position
Year	Pos	P	W	L	D	T	Ded	PC	Pts	PCT	Final Host	Final	Final Position
2019/2021	6/9	12	4	5	3	0	0	660	286	43.3	Rose Bowl, Southampton	DNQ	6th
2021/23	7/9	14	4	6	4	0	0	168	64	38.09	The Oval, London	DNQ	7th
2023/25	9/9	14	5	9	0	0	0	168	47	27.98	Lord's, London	DNQ	9th

=== Cricket World Cup ===
World Cup record
Year	Round	Position	GP	W	L	T	NR	Squad
(England) 1975	Group Stage	5/8	3	1	2	0	0	Squad
(England) 1979	Semi-finals	3/8	4	2	2	0	0	Squad
(England) (Wales) 1983	Semi-finals	4/8	7	3	4	0	0	Squad
(India) (Pakistan) 1987	Semi-finals	4/8	7	5	2	0	0	Squad
(Australia) (New Zealand) 1992	Champions	1/9	10	6	3	0	1	Squad
(India) (Pakistan) (Sri Lanka) 1996	Quarter-finals	6/12	6	4	2	0	0	Squad
(England) (Wales) (Scotland) (Republic of Ireland) (Netherlands) 1999	Runners-up	2/12	10	6	4	0	0	Squad
(South Africa) (Zimbabwe) (Kenya) 2003	Group Stage	10/14	6	2	3	0	1	Squad
(Cricket West Indies) 2007	Group Stage	10/16	3	1	2	0	0	Squad
(India) (Sri Lanka) (Bangladesh) 2011	Semi-finals	3/14	8	6	2	0	0	Squad
(Australia) (New Zealand) 2015	Quarter-finals	6/14	7	4	3	0	0	Squad
(England) (Wales) 2019	Group Stage	5/10	9	5	3	0	1	Squad
(India) 2023	Group stage	5/10	9	4	5	0	0	Squad
(South Africa) (Zimbabwe) (Namibia) 2027	TBA							
(India) (Bangladesh) 2031	TBA							
Total	13/13	1 Title	89	49	37	0	3	

=== T20 World Cup ===
T20 World Cup record
Year	Round	Position	GP	W	L	T	NR	Squad
(South Africa) 2007	Runners-up	2/12	7	5	1	1	0	Squad
(England) 2009	Champions	1/12	7	5	2	0	0	Squad
(Cricket West Indies) 2010	Semi-finals	4/12	6	2	4	0	0	Squad
(Sri Lanka) 2012	Semi-finals	4/12	6	4	2	0	0	Squad
(Bangladesh) 2014	Super 10	5/16	4	2	2	0	0	Squad
(India) 2016	Super 10	7/16	4	1	3	0	0	Squad
(United Arab Emirates) (Oman) 2021	Semi-finals	3/16	6	5	1	0	0	Squad
(Australia) 2022	Runners-up	2/16	7	4	3	0	0	Squad
(Cricket West Indies) (United States) 2024	Group Stage	11/20	4	2	1	1	0	Squad
(India) (Sri Lanka) 2026	Super 8	5/20	7	4	2	0	1	Squad
(Australia) (New Zealand) 2028	TBA							
(England) (Wales) (Scotland) (Republic of Ireland) 2030	TBA							
Total	10/10	1 Title	58	34	21	2	1	

=== Champions Trophy ===
Known as the ’ICC Knockout’ in 1998 and 2000.

Champions Trophy record
Year	Round	Position	GP	W	L	T	NR	Squad
(Bangladesh) 1998	Quarter-finals	5/9	1	0	1	0	0	Squad
(Kenya) 2000	Semi-finals	3/11	2	1	1	0	0	Squad
(Sri Lanka) 2002	Group Stage	5/12	2	1	1	0	0	Squad
(England) 2004	Semi-finals	4/12	3	2	1	0	0	Squad
(India) 2006	Group Stage	8/10	3	1	2	0	0	Squad
(South Africa) 2009	Semi-finals	3/8	4	2	2	0	0	Squad
(England) (Wales) 2013	Group Stage	8/8	3	0	3	0	0	Squad
(England) (Wales) 2017	Champions	1/8	5	4	1	0	0	Squad
(Pakistan) (United Arab Emirates) 2025	Group Stage	7/8	3	0	2	0	1	Squad
(India) 2029	TBD							
Total	9/9	1 Title	26	11	14	0	1	

=== Asia Cup ===
Asia Cup record
Year	Round	Position	GP	W	L	T	NR
(United Arab Emirates) 1984	Group stage	3/3	2	0	2	0	0
(Sri Lanka) 1986	Runners-up	2/3	3	2	1	0	0
(Bangladesh) 1988	Group stage	3/4	3	1	2	0	0
(India) 1990–91	Did not participate						
(United Arab Emirates) 1995	Group Stage	3/4	3	2	1	0	0
(Sri Lanka) 1997	Group Stage	3/4	3	1	1	0	1
(Bangladesh) 2000	Champions	1/4	4	4	0	0	0
(Sri Lanka) 2004	Super Fours	3/6	5	4	1	0	0
(Pakistan) 2008	Super Fours	3/6	5	3	2	0	0
(Sri Lanka) 2010	Group stage	3/4	3	1	2	0	0
(Bangladesh) 2012	Champions	1/4	4	3	1	0	0
(Bangladesh) 2014	Runners-up	2/5	5	3	2	0	0
(Bangladesh) 2016	Group Stage	3/5	4	2	2	0	0
(United Arab Emirates) 2018	Super Fours	3/6	5	2	3	0	0
(United Arab Emirates) 2022	Runners-up	2/6	6	3	3	0	0
(Pakistan) (Sri Lanka) 2023	Super Fours	4/6	5	2	2	0	1
(United Arab Emirates) 2025	Runners-up	2/8	7	4	3	0	0
Total	16/17	2 Titles	67	37	28	0	2

=== Olympic Games ===
Year	Round	Position	Played	Won	Lost	Tie	NR
(United States) 2028	To be determined						
Total							

=== Asian Games ===
Asian Games record
Year	Round	Position	GP	W	L	T	NR
(China) 2010	3rd	3/9	3	2	1	0	0
(South Korea) 2014	Did not participate						
(China) 2022	Semi-finals	4/14	3	1	2	0	0
(Japan) 2026	Final	2/10	3	1	1	0	1
Total	3/4	2nd	9	4	4	0	1

=== Other tournaments ===
Other/Defunct Tournaments
Australian Tri-Series	Commonwealth Games	Asian Test Championship	Austral-Asia Cup	NatWest Series	World Championship of Cricket	Nehru Cup
(Australia) 1981–82: Group stage; (Australia) 1983–84: Group stage; (Australia) 1988–89: Group stage; (Australia) 1989–90: Runners-up; (Australia) 1992–93: Group stage; (Australia) 1996–97: Champions; (Australia) 1999–2000: Runners-up; (Australia) 2004–05: Runners-up	(Malaysia) 1998: Round 1	(India) (Pakistan) (Sri Lanka) 1999: Champions; (Bangladesh) (Pakistan) (Sri Lanka) 2001: Runners-up	(United Arab Emirates) 1986: Champions; (United Arab Emirates) 1990: Champions; (United Arab Emirates) 1994: Champions	(England) 2001: Runners-up	(Australia) 1985: Runners-up	(India) 1989: Champions

== Honours ==
=== ICC ===
- World Cup
  - (gold) Champions (1): 1992
  - (silver) Runners-up (1): 1999
- T20 World Cup
  - (gold) Champions (1): 2009
  - (silver) Runners-up (2): 2007, 2022
- Champions Trophy
  - (gold) Champions (1): 2017

=== ACC ===
- Asia Cup
  - (gold) Champions (2): 2000, 2012
  - (silver) Runners-up (4): 1986, 2014, 2022, 2025
- Asian Test Championship
  - (gold) Champions (1): 1998–99
  - (silver) Runners-up (1): 2001–02

=== Others ===
- Asian Games
  - (silver) Silver Medal (1): 2026
  - (bronze) Bronze Medal (1): 2010
- South Asian Games
  - (bronze) Bronze Medal (1): 2010

== List of international grounds ==
Locations of all stadiums which have hosted an international cricket match within Pakistan

Stadium	City	First Used	Last Used	Test matches	ODI matches	T20I matches	Total matches
PCB Headquarters
Gaddafi Stadium	Lahore	1959	2026	42	73	31	146
Active Stadiums
National Bank Cricket Arena	Karachi	1955	2025	47	59	11	117
Rawalpindi Cricket Stadium	Rawalpindi	1992	2025	17	27	9	53
Multan Cricket Stadium	Multan	2001	2025	10	11	0	21
Iqbal Stadium	Faisalabad	1978	2025	24	19	0	43
Former Stadiums
Imran Khan Cricket Stadium	Peshawar	1984	2006	6	15	0	21
Niaz Stadium	Hyderabad	1973	2008	5	7	0	12
Jinnah Stadium	Gujranwala	1982	2000	1	11	0	12
Sheikhupura Stadium	Sheikhupura	1996	2008	2	2	0	4
Jinnah Stadium	Sialkot	1976	1996	4	9	0	13
Bagh-e-Jinnah	Lahore	1955	1959	3	0	0	3
Ibn-e-Qasim Bagh Stadium	Multan	1980	1994	1	6	0	7
Pindi Club Ground	Rawalpindi	1965	1987	1	2	0	3
Southend Club Cricket Stadium	Karachi	1993	1993	1	0	0	1
Bahawal Stadium	Bahawalpur	1955	1955	1	0	0	1
Peshawar Club Ground	Peshawar	1955	1955	1	0	0	1
Ayub National Stadium	Quetta	1978	1984	0	2	0	2
Zafar Ali Stadium	Sahiwal	1977	1978	0	2	0	2
Bugti Stadium	Quetta	1996	1996	0	1	0	1
Sargodha Cricket Stadium	Sargodha	1992	1992	0	1	0	1

Correct as of the conclusion of Australia's tour in 2026.

== Team colours ==
In Test matches, the team wears cricket whites, with an optional sweater or sweater-vest with a green and gold V-neck for use in cold weather. The team's official sponsors has been Pepsi since 1993 with its logo displayed on the right side of the chest, sister brand TCL on the sleeves, and the Pakistan Cricket star deployed on the left in test cricket. The fielders wear a green cap or a white (or green in ODI and T20 matches) sunhat, with the Pakistan Cricket Star in the middle. Also the helmets are colored green. Boom Boom Cricket signed a deal with Pakistan Cricket Board in April 2010 to become the kit sponsors of the Pakistan team; the deal ended at the end of 2012 Asia Cup. As of 2019, Pakistan is sponsored by AJ Sports, replacing CA Sports, which was the sponsor between 2015 and 2019. As of 2016, AJ Sports returned as the kit manufacturer of Pakistan. For official ICC tournaments, 'Pakistan' is written on the front of the jersey in place of the sponsor logo, with the sponsor logo being placed on the sleeve. However, for non-ICC tournaments and matches, the 'Pepsi' logo feature prominently on the front of the shirt . As always the Pakistan Cricket Board logo is placed on the left chest.

Former suppliers were CA Sports (2015–2019), Hunt, Slazenger and AJ Sports.

Former secondary sponsors were J., ParkView City, Easypaisa, Cool&Cool, Optel and Lay's.

== Logo ==
During the early years, Pakistan cricket team's logo was a shaheen with star and crescent on it but this crest changed in 1959. Pakistan's cricket team's current logo is a star, usually in the color gold or green, with the word "Pakistan" (پاکِستان) written inside in Urdu, Pakistan's national language.

== Current squad ==
On 27 October 2024, The PCB published new central contracts for the Pakistan Cricket team. Central contracts were awarded to 25 players in four different categories.

This is a list of active players who are centrally contracted with PCB or have played for Pakistan in the past 12 months or has been named in the recent Test, ODI or T20I squad. Uncapped players are listed in italics.

Updated on 17 November 2025.

Key
Symbol	Meaning
C/G	The contract grade awarded by the PCB
No.	Shirt number of the player
Format	Denotes that the player recently played in the format

Name	Age	Batting style	Bowling style	Domestic team	PSL team	C/G	Format	No.	Captain	Last Test	Last ODI	Last T20I
Batters
Saim Ayub	24	Left-handed	Right-arm off spin	Karachi Whites	Peshawar Zalmi	C	Test, ODI, T20I	63		(South Africa) 2025	(Sri Lanka) 2025	(South Africa) 2025
Babar Azam	32	Right-handed	Right-arm off spin	Lahore Blues	Peshawar Zalmi	A	Test, ODI, T20I	56		(South Africa) 2025	(Sri Lanka) 2025	(South Africa) 2025
Sahibzada Farhan	30	Right-handed	—N/a	Peshawar	—	—N/a	T20I	51		—N/a	—N/a	(South Africa) 2025
Imam-ul-Haq	30	Left-handed	Right-arm leg spin	Multan	—	—N/a	Test, ODI	26		(South Africa) 2025	(New Zealand) 2025	(Australia) 2019
Mohammad Huraira	24	Right-handed	—N/a	Faisalabad	—	D	Test	99		(Cricket West Indies) 2025	—N/a	—N/a
Irfan Khan	23	Right-handed	Right-arm medium-fast	Faisalabad	Karachi Kings	D	ODI, T20I	80		—N/a	(New Zealand) 2025	(New Zealand) 2025
Shan Masood	37	Left-handed	Right-arm medium-fast	Karachi Whites	Karachi Kings	B	Test	94	Test (c)	(South Africa) 2025	(New Zealand) 2023	(England) 2022
Hasan Nawaz	24	Right-handed	—N/a			—N/a	ODI, T20I			—N/a	(South Africa) 2025	(South Africa) 2025
Abdul Samad	28	Right-handed	—N/a			—N/a	T20I			—N/a	—N/a	(India) 2025
Saud Shakeel	31	Left-handed	Left-arm orthodox	Karachi Whites	Quetta Gladiators	C	Test, ODI	59	Test (vc)	(South Africa) 2025	(India) 2025	—N/a
Abdullah Shafique	27	Right-handed	Right-arm off spin	—	Lahore Qalandars	C	Test, ODI	57		(South Africa) 2025	(Cricket West Indies) 2025	(Afghanistan) 2023
Tayyab Tahir	33	Right-handed	Right-arm leg spin	Lahore Whites	Multan Sultans	—N/a	ODI	66		—N/a	(New Zealand) 2025	(South Africa) 2024
Omair Yousuf	27	Right-handed	—N/a	Karachi Whites	Karachi Kings	—N/a	T20I	30		—N/a	—N/a	(New Zealand) 2025
Fakhar Zaman	36	Left-handed	Left-arm orthodox	Abbottabad	Lahore Qalandars	—N/a	ODI, T20I	39		(South Africa) 2019	(Sri Lanka) 2025	(India) 2025
All-rounders
Asif Afridi	39	Right-handed	Left-arm orthodox			—N/a	Test			(South Africa) 2025	—N/a	—N/a
Salman Ali Agha	36	Right-handed	Right-arm off spin	—	Islamabad United	C	Test, ODI, T20I	67	T20I (c)	(South Africa) 2025	(Sri Lanka) 2025	(South Africa) 2025
Faheem Ashraf	32	Left-handed	Right-arm medium			—N/a	ODI, T20I			—N/a	(Sri Lanka) 2025	(South Africa) 2025
Kamran Ghulam	31	Right-handed	Left-arm orthodox	Peshawar	Multan Sultans	D	Test, ODI	82		(Cricket West Indies) 2025	(New Zealand) 2025	—N/a
Aamir Jamal	30	Right-handed	Right-arm medium-fast	Lahore Whites	Karachi Kings	D	Test	65		(South Africa) 2025	(Zimbabwe) 2024	(New Zealand) 2024
Jahandad Khan	23	Left-handed	Left-arm medium-fast	Rawalpindi	Lahore Qalandars	—N/a	T20I	58		—N/a	—N/a	(New Zealand) 2025
Sajid Khan	33	Right-handed	Right-arm off spin	Peshawar	—	C	Test	68		(South Africa) 2025	—N/a	—N/a
Shadab Khan	28	Right-handed	Right-arm leg spin	Rawalpindi	Islamabad United	C	T20I	7		(England) 2020	(England) 2023	(Bangladesh) 2025
Mohammad Nawaz	32	Left-handed	Left-arm orthodox	Rawalpindi	Islamabad United	—N/a	ODI, T20I	21		(England) 2022	(Sri Lanka) 2025	(South Africa) 2025
Hussain Talat	30	Left-handed	Right-arm medium-fast			—N/a	ODI, T20I			—N/a	(Sri Lanka) 2025	(India) 2025
Khushdil Shah	31	Left-handed	Left-arm orthodox			—N/a	ODI, T20I			—N/a	(India) 2025	(United Arab Emirates) 2025
Wicket-keeper-batters
Haseebullah Khan	23	Left-handed	—N/a	Multan	Quetta Gladiators	D	ODI	53		—N/a	(Sri Lanka) 2025	(Australia) 2024
Usman Khan	31	Right-handed	—N/a	Karachi Whites	Multan Sultans	D	T20I	78		—N/a	(New Zealand) 2025	(South Africa) 2025
Mohammad Rizwan	34	Right-handed	—N/a	Peshawar	Multan Sultans	A	Test, ODI	16		(South Africa) 2025	(Sri Lanka) 2025	(South Africa) 2024
Spin bowlers
Abrar Ahmed	28	Right-handed	Right-arm leg spin	Karachi Whites	Quetta Gladiators	C	Test, ODI, T20I	40		(Cricket West Indies) 2025	(Sri Lanka) 2025	(South Africa) 2025
Faisal Akram	23	Left-handed	Left-arm unorthodox	Multan	Multan Sultans	—N/a	ODI	37		—N/a	(Sri Lanka) 2025	—N/a
Noman Ali	40	Left-handed	Left-arm orthodox	Karachi Whites	—	C	Test	61		(South Africa) 2025	—N/a	—N/a
Sufiyan Muqeem	27	Left-handed	Left-arm unorthodox	Lahore Whites	Peshawar Zalmi	—N/a	ODI, T20I	13		—N/a	(Cricket West Indies) 2025	(India) 2025
Usman Tariq	28	Right-handed	Right-arm off spin			—N/a	T20I			—N/a	—N/a	(South Africa) 2025
Pace bowlers
Mohammad Abbas	36	Right-handed	Right-arm medium-fast			—N/a	Test			(South Africa) 2025	(Australia) 2019	—N/a
Abbas Afridi	25	Right-handed	Right-arm medium-fast	Peshawar	Karachi Kings	D	T20I	55		—N/a	—N/a	(Bangladesh) 2025
Shaheen Shah Afridi	26	Left-handed	Left-arm fast	FATA	Lahore Qalandars	B	Test, ODI, T20I	10	ODI (c)	(South Africa) 2025	(Sri Lanka) 2025	(South Africa) 2025
Hasan Ali	32	Right-handed	Right-arm medium-fast	—	Karachi Kings	—N/a	Test, ODI, T20I	32		(South Africa) 2025	(Cricket West Indies) 2025	(United Arab Emirates) 2025
Kashif Ali	32	Right-handed	Right-arm medium			—N/a	Test			(Cricket West Indies) 2025	—N/a	—N/a
Mohammad Ali	34	Right-handed	Right-arm medium-fast	Faisalabad	Peshawar Zalmi	D	ODI, T20I	13		(Bangladesh) 2024	(New Zealand) 2025	(New Zealand) 2025
Mir Hamza	34	Left-handed	Left-arm medium	Karachi Whites	Karachi Kings	D	Test	31		(South Africa) 2025	—N/a	—N/a
Mohammad Hasnain	26	Right-handed	Right-arm fast	Hyderabad	Multan Sultans	—N/a	ODI	87		—N/a	(South Africa) 2025	(Zimbabwe) 2024
Akif Javed	26	Right-handed	Left-arm medium-fast			—N/a	ODI			—N/a	(New Zealand) 2025	—N/a
Salman Mirza	32	Right-handed	Left-arm fast			—N/a	T20I			—N/a	—N/a	(South Africa) 2025
Haris Rauf	33	Right-handed	Right-arm fast	Islamabad	Lahore Qalandars	C	ODI, T20I	97		(England) 2022	(Sri Lanka) 2025	(India) 2025
Naseem Shah	23	Right-handed	Right-arm fast	—	Islamabad United	B	ODI, T20I	71		(South Africa) 2024	(Sri Lanka) 2025	(South Africa) 2025
Khurram Shahzad	26	Right-handed	Right-arm medium-fast	Faisalabad	Quetta Gladiators	D	Test	49		(Cricket West Indies) 2025	—N/a	—N/a
Mohammad Wasim	25	Right-handed	Right-arm fast-medium	FATA	Quetta Gladiators	D	ODI	74		(New Zealand) 2022	(Sri Lanka) 2025	(New Zealand) 2024

=== Pay grade ===
The PCB awards central contracts to its players which are pay graded according to the category of the contract. Players will receive 3% of annual revenue from ICC, which will be paid over and above their monthly retainers and match fees. Players' monthly salaries are as follows:

- Category A – Rs. 4.5 million
- Category B – Rs. 3 million
- Category C & D – Rs. 0.75 million – Rs. 1.5 million

=== Current coaching staff ===
Position	Name	Nationality
Red-Ball Management (Test)
Head coach	Mike Hesson	New Zealand
Batting coach	Asad Shafiq	Pakistan
Bowling coach	Ashley Noffke	Australia
Fielding coach	Abdul Saad	Pakistan
White-Ball Management (ODI & T20I)
Head coach	Mike Hesson	New Zealand
Batting coach	Hanif Malik	Pakistan
Bowling coach	Ashley Noffke	Australia
Fielding coach	Mansoor Amjad	Pakistan
Support Personnel
Team manager	Naveed Akram Cheema	Pakistan
Physiotherapist	Cliffe Deacon	South Africa
Strength & conditioning coach	Grant Luden	South Africa
Team analyst	Usman Hashmi	Pakistan
Team doctor	Dr. Wajid Ali Rafai	Pakistan

=== Coaching history ===
Pakistan has been known for its high turnover of head coaches. In 2014 it was reported that Pakistan had changed head coach 27 times since 1992, with a number of coaches sacked midway through tournaments or series and several coaches serving multiple stints.

- 1995: Intikhab Alam
- 1996: Mushtaq Mohammad
- 1996–1998: Haroon Rasheed
- 1998–1999: Javed Miandad
- 1999: Mushtaq Mohammad
- 1999: Wasim Raja (interim)
- 1999: Richard Pybus (interim)
- 1999–2000: Intikhab Alam
- 2000–2001: Javed Miandad
- 2001: Richard Pybus
- 2001–2002: Mudassar Nazar
- 2002–2003: Richard Pybus
- 2003–2004: Javed Miandad
- 2004–2007: Bob Woolmer
- 2007–2008: Geoff Lawson
- 2008–2010: Intikhab Alam
- 2010–2011: Waqar Younis
- 2011–2012: Mohsin Khan (interim)
- 2012–2014: Dav Whatmore
- 2014: Moin Khan (interim)
- 2014–2016: Waqar Younis
- 2016–2019: Mickey Arthur
- 2019–2021: Misbah-ul-Haq
- 2021–2023: Saqlain Mushtaq
- 2023: Abdul Rehman (interim)
- 2023: Grant Bradburn (Note: Bradburn was initially appointed as interim head coach for the 2022–23 New Zealand series; and was later given the job permanently on 13 May 2023.) & Mickey Arthur (Note: Although Bradburn was appointed head coach, Arthur served as director and the de facto head coach.)
- 2023–2024: Mohammad Hafeez (Note: Hafeez did not serve as head coach but was appointed director, a merger of the roles of director and head coach.) (interim)
- 2024: Azhar Mahmood (interim)
- 2024: Jason Gillespie (Test) & Gary Kirsten (ODI & T20I)
- 2024: Jason Gillespie (interim) (Note: Gillespie served as the permanent Test head coach but acted as the temporary limited overs head coach.)
- 2024: Jason Gillespie (Test) & Aaqib Javed (Note: Javed was the interim limited overs head coach.) (ODI & T20I)
- 2024–2025: Aaqib Javed (interim)
- 2025: Aaqib Javed (interim Test) & Mike Hesson (ODI & T20I)
- 2026: Sarfaraz Ahmed (Test) & Mike Hesson (ODI & T20I). Ahmed was replaced partway through the 2026 Pakistan Test tour of England, after serving in the role for six Test matches.
- 2026: Mike Hesson

== Selection committee ==
On 12 October 2024, the selection committee was restructured with Aaqib Javed, Aleem Dar, Azhar Ali, Asad Shafiq and data analyst Hassan Cheema announced as members of the committee. The captain and coach were originally appointed to the committee, however they were later removed. There is no head of the selection committee.

== Records ==
=== Results summary ===
	Matches	Won	Lost	Drawn	Tied	No result	First match
Test	474	153	155	166	–	–	16 October 1952
ODI	1002	529	443	–	9	21	11 February 1973
T20I	301	174	115	–	4	8	28 August 2006

==== Test record versus other nations ====
Pakistan's Test cricket record by opponent
Opponent	Matches	Won	Lost	Tied	Draw	W/L Ratio	% Won	% Lost	% Drew	First	Last
Australia	72	15	37	0	20	0.41	20.83	45.83	27.77	1956	2024
Bangladesh	17	12	4	0	1	3.00	70.59	23.53	5.88	2001	2026
England	95	23	33	0	39	0.69	24.21	34.74	41.05	1954	2026
India	59	12	9	0	38	1.33	20.33	15.25	64.40	1952	2007
Ireland	1	1	0	0	0	-	100.00	00.00	00.00	2018	2018
New Zealand	62	25	14	0	23	1.78	40.32	22.58	37.09	1955	2023
South Africa	32	7	18	0	7	0.39	21.88	56.25	21.86	1995	2025
Sri Lanka	59	23	17	0	19	1.35	38.98	28.81	32.20	1982	2023
West Indies	58	23	20	0	15	1.15	39.66	34.48	25.86	1958	2026
Zimbabwe	19	12	3	0	4	4.00	63.15	15.78	21.05	1993	2021
Total	474	153	155	0	166	0.99	32.28	32.70	35.02	1952	2026
Statistics are correct as of Pakistan v England, 3rd Test, 9–12 September 2026.

==== ODI record versus other nations ====
Opponent	Matches	Won	Lost	Tied	No Result	% Won	First	Last
Full Members
Afghanistan	8	7	1	0	0	87.50	2012	2023
Australia	114	38	72	1	3	34.68	1975	2026
Bangladesh	42	35	7	0	0	83.33	1986	2026
England	92	32	57	0	3	34.78	1974	2023
India	136	73	58	0	5	53.68	1978	2025
Ireland	7	5	1	1	0	71.43	2007	2016
New Zealand	122	61	57	1	3	50	1973	2025
South Africa	90	36	53	0	1	40	1992	2025
Sri Lanka	160	96	59	1	4	60	1975	2025
West Indies	140	64	73	3	0	45.71	1975	2025
Zimbabwe	65	56	5	2	2	86.15	1992	2024
Associate Members
Canada	2	2	0	0	0	100.00	1979	2011
Hong Kong	3	3	0	0	0	100.00	2004	2018
Kenya	6	6	0	0	0	100.00	1996	2011
Namibia	1	1	0	0	0	100.00	2003	2003
Nepal	1	1	0	0	0	100.00	2023	2023
Netherlands	7	7	0	0	0	100.00	1996	2023
Scotland	3	3	0	0	0	100.00	1999	2013
United Arab Emirates	3	3	0	0	0	100.00	1994	2015
Total	1002	529	443	9	21	52.79	1973	2026
Statistics are correct as of Pakistan v Australia at Gaddafi Stadium, Lahore, 4 June 2026.

==== T20I record versus other nations ====
Opponent	Matches	Won	Lost	Tied	Tie+Win	Tie+Loss	No Result	% Won	First	Last
Full Members
Afghanistan	10	6	4	0	0	0	0	60.00	2013	2025
Australia	31	15	14	0	1	0	1	48.39	2007	2026
Bangladesh	27	22	5	0	0	0	0	81.48	2007	2026
England	32	9	21	0	0	1	1	28.13	2006	2026
India	18	3	14	0	0	1	0	16.67	2007	2026
Ireland	5	4	1	0	0	0	0	80.00	2009	2024
New Zealand	50	24	23	0	0	0	3	48	2007	2026
South Africa	27	14	13	0	0	0	0	51.85	2007	2025
Sri Lanka	30	18	12	0	0	0	0	60.00	2007	2026
West Indies	24	17	4	0	0	0	3	70.83	2011	2025
Zimbabwe	23	20	3	0	0	0	0	86.96	2008	2025
Associate Members
Canada	2	2	0	0	0	0	0	100.00	2008	2024
Hong Kong	2	2	0	0	0	0	0	100.00	2022	2023
Kenya	1	1	0	0	0	0	0	100.00	2007	2007
Namibia	2	2	0	0	0	0	0	100.00	2021	2026
Netherlands	3	3	0	0	0	0	0	100.00	2009	2026
Oman	1	1	0	0	0	0	0	100.00	2025	2025
Scotland	4	4	0	0	0	0	0	100.00	2007	2021
United Arab Emirates	4	4	0	0	0	0	0	100.00	2016	2025
United States	2	1	0	0	0	1	0	50	2024	2026
ICC World	3	2	1	0	0	0	0	66.67	2017	2017
Total	301	174	115	0	1	3	8	57.81	2006	2026
Statistics are correct as of Pakistan v India at Kōrogi Athletic Park, Nisshin, 3 October 2026.

=== Batting ===
==== Test batting records ====
Name	International career span	Year set	Record description	Record	Notes
Hanif Mohammad	1952–69	1958	8th highest Test match innings; Slowest Test triple century; Highest Test innings on foreign soil; 4th highest Test innings by an opener	337 runs 970min	Hanif scored 337 runs against the West Indies in 1958, which was also the first triple century by an Asian cricketer, and at the time the longest innings by any batsman in terms of time spent at the wicket.
Javed Miandad	1976–96	1976	Only teenager to score a double century	19y 140d	
Javed Miandad	1976–96	Career	6th most Test double centuries	6	
Javed Miandad	1976–96	Career	Only player to score a century in his 1st, 50th & 100th Test match		
Javed Miandad	1976–96	Career	Only player whose career batting average never fell below 50		
Javed Miandad	1976–96	Career	16th most Test runs	8,832 runs	Javed Miandad's record is also the 2nd most Test runs by a Pakistani
Taslim Arif	1980	1980	3rd highest Test match innings by a wicketkeeper	210*	
Inzamam-ul-Haq	1991–2007	Career	Joint 4th most sixes in an inning	9	
Inzamam-ul-Haq	1991–2007	Career	17th Most Test Runs	8,830 runs	Inzamam's record is also the 3rd most Test runs by a Pakistani
Mohammad Yousuf	1998–2010	2006	Most Test match runs in a calendar year	1,788	
Mohammad Yousuf	1998–2010	2006	Most Test centuries in a calendar year	9	
Mohammad Yousuf	1998–2010	2006	Most centuries in successive Tests	6 centuries/5 Tests	
Shahid Afridi	1998–2010	2004–05	Joint 5th fastest Test fifty	26 balls	
Shahid Afridi	1998–2010	2006	Joint most sixes off consecutive deliveries	4	
Younis Khan	2000–2017	2009	5th highest individual innings by a captain	313	Younis scored 313 against Sri Lanka in 2009, becoming the third Pakistani to reach a triple century, and also attaining the third highest Test Innings by a Pakistani
Younis Khan	2000–2017	Career	13th highest run scorer	10099 runs	Younis Khan's record is also the most Test runs by a Pakistani
Younis Khan	2000–2017	Career	Joint 6th most Test hundreds	34 Test Hundreds	Younis Khan's record is also the most Test hundreds by a Pakistani
Younis Khan	2000–2017	2017	1st Pakistani batsman (13th overall) to reach 10,000 Test runs		
Yasir Hameed	2003–10	2003	Scored centuries in both the innings of his debut test	170 & 105	Yasir Hameed, in 2003, on his Test debut he scored 170 runs in Karachi. This is the highest score by a Pakistani on debut. He also scored 105 in the second innings of the same match, becoming only player to do so after West Indies' Lawrence Row
Misbah-ul-Haq	2001–2017	2014	Fastest half-century	21 balls	
Misbah-ul-Haq	2001–2017	2014	Joint second-fastest century	56 balls	
Misbah-ul-Haq	2001–2017	2017	Most sixes hit by a captain in Tests	69	

==== One-Day International batting records ====
Name	International career span	Year set	Record description	Record	Notes
Inzamam-Ul-Haq	1991–2007	Career	6th highest career ODI runs	11,739	
Saeed Anwar	1989–2003	1997	Joint 9th highest ODI innings	194	
Shahid Afridi	1996–2015	1996	Third-fastest ODI century	37 balls	Afridi scored his maiden century in his maiden innings in 1996, against Sri Lanka at Kenya. He was originally in the team as a bowling replacement for Mushtaq Ahmed, and walked out as a pinch-hitter up the order using Waqar Younis's bat
Shahid Afridi	1996–2015	Career	Most sixes in ODI	351 sixes	
Babar Azam	2015 – present	2017	Joint-third fastest to 1000 ODI runs	21 innings	
Babar Azam	2015 – present	2018	Joint-second fastest to 2000 ODI runs	45 innings	
Babar Azam	2015 – present	2019	Second fastest to 3000 ODI runs	68 innings	
Babar Azam	2015 – present	2016–17	First batsman to score 5 consecutive centuries in one country in ODIs		He had scores of 120, 123, 117, 103, 101 in UAE
Babar Azam	2015 – present	2022	Second fastest to 4000 ODI runs	82 innings	
Babar Azam	2015 – present	2023	Fastest to 5000 ODI runs	97 innings	
Fakhar Zaman	2017–present	2018	First Pakistani player and sixth overall to score a double century in ODIs	210	
Fakhar Zaman	2017–present	2018	Fastest to 1000 ODI runs	18 innings	
Fakhar Zaman	2017–present	2018	Most runs in 5 match ODI series	515 runs	

==== T20 International batting records ====
Name	International career span	Year set	Record description	Record	Notes
Mohammad Hafeez	2006–21	Career	8th most runs in career	1,908	
Shoaib Malik	2006–21	Career	3rd most runs in career	2,263	
Shahid Afridi	2006–16	2010	3rd highest innings strike rate	357.14	
Babar Azam	2016–present	Career	Fastest to score 1,000 runs	26 innings	

=== Bowling ===
==== Test bowling records ====
Name	International career span	Year set	Record description	Record	Notes
Wasim Akram	1984–2003	Career	12th most Test wickets	414	Akram also holds the record of most Test wickets by a Pakistani bowler
Waqar Younis	1989–2003	Career	8th-best strike rate (more than 2000 balls bowled)	43.4	

==== One-Day International bowling records ====
Name	International career span	Year set	Record description	Record	Notes
Wasim Akram	1984–2003	Career	2nd most ODI wickets	502	Akram's record was surpassed by Muttiah Muralitharan. Akram still holds the record of most ODI wickets by a Pakistani bowler
Wasim Akram	1984–2003	Career	One of three bowlers to take 2 ODI hat-tricks		The other bowlers were Saqlain Mustaq and Chaminda Vaas
Waqar Younis	1989–2003	Career	3rd most ODI wickets	416	Waqar also holds the record of second most ODI wickets by a Pakistani bowler
Saqlain Mushtaq	1995–2004	Career	Fastest to reach 100, 150, 200 and 250 wickets First spinner to take a hat-trick in an ODI		He has taken 2 ODI hat-tricks

==== Miscellaneous records ====
Name	International career span	Year set	Record description	Record	Notes
Wasim Akram	1984–2003	Career	First bowler to take a hat-trick in both Test and ODI		Mohammad Sami (see below) has since taken a hat-trick in all forms of the game
Wasim Akram	1984–2003	Career	Only bowler to take four hat-tricks		Lasith Malinga has since matched and broken this record
Wasim Akram	1984–2003	Career	1st bowler to take 400 wickets in both Test and ODI		Muttiah Muralitharan has since achieved this
Mohammad Sami	2001–present	Career	First bowler to achieve a hat-trick in all three formats of the game		

== See also ==
- Cricket in Pakistan
- India–Pakistan cricket rivalry
- Benaud–Qadir Trophy
- Afghanistan–Pakistan cricket rivalry
- Pakistan blind cricket team
- Pakistan cricket team records
- Pakistan national women's cricket team
- Pakistan U-19 cricket team
- Pakistan Super League
- Pakistani national cricket captains
- Politics and sports
- List of Pakistan Test cricketers
- List of Pakistan ODI cricketers
- List of Pakistan Twenty20 International cricketers

== Notes ==
Preceded by India	Test match playing teams 16 October 1952	Succeeded by Sri Lanka
