= 2009–10 Bangladesh Tri-Series =

Tri-Series in Bangladesh in 2010
- Date: 4–13 January 2010
- Location: Bangladesh
- Result: Won by Sri Lanka
- Player of the series: Kumar Sangakkara (SL)
Teams
India	Bangladesh	Sri Lanka
Captains
Mahendra Singh Dhoni	Shakib Al Hasan	Kumar Sangakkara
Most runs
Virat Kohli (275)	Mahmudullah (193)	Sangakkara (274)
Most wickets
Harbhajan Singh (6)	Naeem Islam (3)	Chanaka Welegedara (8)

The Tri-Series in Bangladesh in 2010 was a One Day International cricket tournament for the Idea Cup, which was held in Bangladesh from 4 January to 13 January 2010. The tournament involved the national teams of India, Sri Lanka, and Bangladesh. The tournament was won by Sri Lanka, who defeated India in the final match, which was held on 13 January 2010.

== Background ==
India: Indian team's key batsman Sachin Tendulkar opted out of the tournament in order to rest for the tests against Bangladesh which were scheduled to be held after this tournament. Tendulkar was replaced by Rohit Sharma in the 16-man squad. The fast bowlers Ishant Sharma and Praveen Kumar were dropped and replaced by Sreesanth and Ashok Dinda, and spinner Pragyan Ojha was replaced by Amit Mishra.

Sri Lanka: Sri Lanka made various changes to its side due to the poor performance of players such as Sanath Jayasuriya, Chamara Kapugedera, Lasith Malinga, and Ajantha Mendis in the recently concluded tour of India and injuries to players, namely Mahela Jayawardene, Angelo Mathews, and bowlers Muttiah Muralitharan and Dilhara Fernando. However, Tillakaratne Dilshan suffered a groin injury in the first match against Bangladesh and missed the two successive matches of the tournament. Other players who suffered injuries were Chamara Silva, who fractured his thumb during the training, and Muthumudalige Pushpakumara, who injured his shoulder in the second match of the tournament against India. To fill the void in the squad, Sri Lanka brought Mahela Jayawardene, Dinesh Chandimal, and Mahela Udawatte into the team.

Bangladesh: Bangladesh went into the tournament without their fast bowler, Mashrafe Mortaza, who failed to recover from his knee injury. The Bangladeshi squad also featured two former ICL players, opener Shahriar Nafees and batsman Aftab Ahmed. The squad also featured an uncapped player, Shafiul Islam, who is a fast bowler. Just before the start of the tournament, Bangladesh fast bowler Nazmul Hossain was ruled out of the tri-series because of his injury and was replaced by Shahadat Hossain in the squad.

== Squads ==
Squads for the Tri-Series
#	India	Sri Lanka	Bangladesh
1	Mahendra Singh Dhoni (Captain & WK)	Kumar Sangakkara (Captain & WK)	Mushfiqur Rahim (Captain & WK)
2	Virender Sehwag (Vice-Captain)	Tillakaratne Dilshan (Vice-Captain)	Shakib Al Hasan (Vice-Captain)
3	Gautam Gambhir	Upul Tharanga	Mohammad Ashraful
4	Virat Kohli	Thilan Samaraweera	Abdur Razzak
5	Suresh Raina	Thilina Kandamby	Tamim Iqbal
6	Rohit Sharma	Chamara Silva	Syed Rasel
7	Ravindra Jadeja	Lahiru Thirimanne	Raqibul Hasan
8	Harbhajan Singh	Thissara Perera	Mahmudullah
9	Zaheer Khan	Muthumudalige Pushpakumara	Shahadat Hossain
10	Ashish Nehra	Malinga Bandara	Naeem Islam
11	Yuvraj Singh	Suraj Randiv	Imrul Kayes
12	Sudeep Tyagi	Thilan Thushara	Rubel Hossain
13	Dinesh Karthik	Suranga Lakmal	Shafiul Islam
14	Sreesanth	Nuwan Kulasekara	Shahriar Nafees
15	Ashok Dinda	Chanaka Welegedara	Aftab Ahmed
16	Amit Mishra		

== Matches ==
=== Group stage ===
Pos	Team	P	W	L	NR	T	Points	NRR	For	Against
1	India	4	3	1	0	0	13	+0.753	1039 (173.1 overs)	1039 (194.1 overs)
2	Sri Lanka	4	3	1	0	0	12	–0.051	1009 (181.5 overs)	1002 (182.4 overs)
3	Bangladesh	4	0	4	0	0	0	–0.684	1052 (200.0 overs)	1059 (178.1 overs)

= Qualified for Finals	= Did not qualify

4 January 2010
D/N
Scorecard

Bangladesh; 260/7 (50 overs)	v	Sri Lanka; 261/3 (44.5 overs)
Mohammad Ashraful 75 (94); Suranga Lakmal 2/63 (9 overs)		Tillakaratne Dilshan 104 (122); Mahmudullah 1/32 (6 overs)

Sri Lanka won by 7 wickets
Sher-e-Bangla Cricket Stadium, Dhaka
Umpires: Enamul Haque (Ban) and Ian Gould (Eng)
Player of the match: Tillakaratne Dilshan (SL)

- Points: Sri Lanka 4, Bangladesh 0.
- Sri Lanka won the toss and elected to field.
- Shafiul Islam made his ODI debut for Bangladesh.

5 January 2010
D/N
Scorecard

India; 279/9 (50 overs)	v	Sri Lanka; 283/5 (48 overs)
Yuvraj Singh 74 (84); Chanaka Welegedara 5/66 (10 overs)		Thilan Samaraweera 105* (106); Harbhajan Singh 3/47 (10 overs)

Sri Lanka won by 5 wickets
Sher-e-Bangla Cricket Stadium, Dhaka
Umpires: Nadir Shah (Ban) and Simon Taufel (Aus)
Player of the match: Thilan Samaraweera (SL)

- Points: Sri Lanka 4, India 0.
- Sri Lanka won the toss and elected to field.
- Lahiru Thirimanne made his ODI debut for Sri Lanka.

7 January 2010
D/N
Scorecard

Bangladesh; 296/6 (50 overs)	v	India; 297/4 (47.3 overs)
Imrul Kayes 70 (100); Yuvraj Singh 1/33 (10 overs)		Mahendra Singh Dhoni 101* (107); Shakib Al Hasan 1/45 (10 overs)

India won by 6 wickets
Sher-e-Bangla Cricket Stadium, Dhaka
Umpires: Enamul Haque (Ban) and Ian Gould (Eng)
Player of the match: Mahendra Singh Dhoni (Ind)

- Points: India 4, Bangladesh 0.
- Bangladesh won the toss and elected to bat.
- Bangladesh posted their highest total against a Test-playing nation, putting up a total of 296.

8 January 2010
D/N
Scorecard

Bangladesh; 249/9 (50 overs)	v	Sri Lanka; 252/1 (42.5 overs)
Shakib Al Hasan 47 (75); Thissara Perera 2/32 (10 overs)		Upul Tharanga 118* (126); Naeem Islam 1/35 (5 overs)

Sri Lanka won by 9 wickets
Sher-e-Bangla Cricket Stadium, Dhaka
Umpires: Sharfuddoula (Ban) and Simon Taufel (Aus)
Player of the match: Upul Tharanga (SL)

- Points: Sri Lanka 4, Bangladesh 0
- Sri Lanka won the toss and elected to field.
- The opening partnership of 215 runs by Upul Tharanga and Mahela Jayawardene is the 3rd highest partnership for 1st wicket and 4th highest partnership for any wicket for Sri Lanka in ODI cricket.

10 January 2010
D/N
Scorecard

Sri Lanka; 213 (46.1 overs)	v	India; 214/2 (32.4 overs)
Kumar Sangakkara 68 (78); Zaheer Khan 3/38 (10 overs)		Virat Kohli 71* (68); Thissara Perera 1/32 (5 overs)

India won by 8 wickets
Sher-e-Bangla Cricket Stadium, Dhaka
Umpires: Enamul Haque (Ban) and Ian Gould (Eng)
Player of the match: Zaheer Khan (Ind)

- Points: India 5, Sri Lanka 0.
- Sri Lanka won the toss and elected to bat.

11 January 2010
D/N
Scorecard

Bangladesh; 247/6 (50 overs)	v	India; 249/4 (43 overs)
Shakib Al Hasan 85 (97); Ashish Nehra 2/58 (10 overs)		Virat Kohli 102* (95); Naeem Islam 2/35 (8 overs)

India won by 6 wickets
Sher-e-Bangla Cricket Stadium, Dhaka
Umpires: Sharfuddoula (Ban) and Simon Taufel (Aus)
Player of the match: Virat Kohli (Ind)

- Points: India 4, Bangladesh 0.
- India won the toss and elected to field.

=== Final ===
13 January 2010
D/N
Scorecard

India; 245 (48.2 overs)	v	Sri Lanka; 249/6 (48.3 overs)
Suresh Raina 106 (115); Nuwan Kulasekara 4/48 (10 overs)		Mahela Jayawardene 71* (81); Harbhajan Singh 2/41 (10 overs)

Sri Lanka won by 4 wickets
Sher-e-Bangla Cricket Stadium, Dhaka
Umpires: Enamul Haque (Ban) and Ian Gould (Eng)
Player of the match: Nuwan Kulasekara (SL)

- Sri Lanka won the toss and elected to field.
- Virender Sehwag became the sixth Indian batsman to score over 7000 ODI runs.

== Tournament statistics ==
=== Team ===
==== Highest totals ====
Highest team total (Top 5)
Score (Overs)	Country	Versus	Venue	Date
297-4 (47.3)	India	Bangladesh	Dhaka	2010-01-07
296-6 (50)	Bangladesh	India	Dhaka	2010-01-07
283-5 (48)	Sri Lanka	India	Dhaka	2010-01-05
279-9 (50)	India	Sri Lanka	Dhaka	2010-01-05
261-3 (44.5)	Sri Lanka	Bangladesh	Dhaka	2010-01-04
Source: Cricinfo.com

=== Batting ===
==== Most runs in the tournament ====
Most runs (Top 5)
Player	Team	M	I	NO	Total	Avg	50s	100s	HS	S/R	4s	6s
Virat Kohli	India	5	5	2	275	91.0	2	1	102*	96.49	28	0
Kumar Sangakkara	Sri Lanka	5	5	1	274	68.05	4	0	74	92.56	33	0
Suresh Raina	India	5	4	2	210	105.0	1	1	106	94.59	20	2
Mahmudullah	Bangladesh	4	4	3	193	48.5	2	0	64*	98.46	18	2
Tillakaratne Dilshan	Sri Lanka	3	3	0	186	37.2	1	1	104	96.37	28	0
Source: Cricinfo.com

==== Highest individual scores ====
Highest scores (Top 5)
Runs	Balls	Batsman	Country	Versus	Venue	Date	Strike rate
118*	126	Upul Tharanga	Sri Lanka	Bangladesh	Dhaka	2010-01-08	93.65
108	117	Mahela Jayawardene	Sri Lanka	Bangladesh	Dhaka	2010-01-08	92.30
106	115	Suresh Raina	India	Sri Lanka	Dhaka	2010-01-13	92.17
105*	106	Thilan Samaraweera	Sri Lanka	India	Dhaka	2010-01-05	99.05
104	122	Tillakaratne Dilshan	Sri Lanka	Bangladesh	Dhaka	2010-01-04	85.24
Source: Cricinfo.com

==== Highest partnerships of the tournament ====
Highest Partnerships (Top 5)
Runs (Balls)	Wicket	Partnerships	Country	Versus	Venue	Date
215 (227)	1st	Upul Tharanga/Mahela Jayawardene	Sri Lanka	Bangladesh	Dhaka	2010-01-08
152 (161)	4th	Virat Kohli/Mahendra Singh Dhoni	India	Bangladesh	Dhaka	2010-01-07
148 (152)	2nd	Tillakaratne Dilshan/Kumar Sangakkara	Sri Lanka	Bangladesh	Dhaka	2010-01-04
122 (124)	3rd	Kumar Sangakkara/Thilan Samaraweera	Sri Lanka	India	Dhaka	2010-01-05
106 (128)	6th	Shakib Al Hasan/Mahmudullah	Bangladesh	India	Dhaka	2010-01-11
Source: Cricinfo.com

=== Bowling ===
==== Most wickets in the tournament ====
Most wickets (Top 5)
Player	Team	Matches	Overs	Mdns	Runs	Wkts	BBI	Avg	Econ	S/R	4wi	5wi
Chanaka Welegedara	Sri Lanka	4	33.4	2	209	8	5/66	26.12	6.20	25.2	0	1
Nuwan Kulasekara	Sri Lanka	3	30.0	2	142	7	4/48	20.28	4.73	25.7	1	0
Thissara Perera	Sri Lanka	4	29.2	1	140	6	2/27	23.33	4.77	29.3	0	0
Harbhajan Singh	India	3	29.0	1	144	6	3/47	24.00	4.96	29.0	0	0
Suraj Randiv	Sri Lanka	5	45.0	1	193	5	2/40	38.60	4.28	54.0	0	0
Source: Cricinfo.com

=== Fielding ===
==== Most catches in the tournament ====
Only players with 2 catches or more are listed
Catches	Player	Team	Matches	Innings
4	Virat Kohli	India	5	5
4	Thilan Samaraweera	Sri Lanka	5	5
3	Gautam Gambhir	India	5	5
3	Suresh Raina	India	5	5
2	Suranga Lakmal	Sri Lanka	3	3
2	Chanaka Welegedara	Sri Lanka	4	4
2	Yuvraj Singh	India	5	5
Source: Cricinfo.com

=== Wicket-keeping ===
==== Most dismissals in the tournament ====
Dismissals (stumpings)	Player	Team	Matches	Innings
7 (0)	Kumar Sangakkara	Sri Lanka	5	5
4 (0)	Mushfiqur Rahim	Bangladesh	4	4
3 (1)	Mahendra Singh Dhoni	India	5	5
Source: Cricinfo.com

== Media coverage ==
=== Television ===
- NEO Cricket (live) - India, Hong Kong, Japan, Taiwan, Korea, Sri Lanka and Bangladesh
- Doordarshan (live) - India's matches only
- Zee Sports (live) - United States of America
- Commonwealth Broadcasting Network (live) - Canada
- Fox Sports (live) - Australia
- Sky Sports (live) - United Kingdom
- Supersport (live) – South Africa, Kenya and Zimbabwe
- Eurosport (live) - Europe
- StarHub (pay per view) - Malaysia and Singapore

=== Online ===
- Espn360.com (Free) - USA
