= 2019 Dhaka Dynamites season =

The Dhaka Dynamites are a franchise cricket team based in Dhaka, Bangladesh, which plays in the Bangladesh Premier League (BPL). Captained by Shakib Al Hasan, they were one of seven teams that competed in the 2018–19 Bangladesh Premier League.

== Icon player ==
Shakib Al Hasan remained the team's icon player from the previous season as he was retained before the draft.

== Points table ==
Pos	Team	Pld	W	L	NR	Pts	NRR
1	Rangpur Riders (3)	12	8	4	0	16	1.018
2	Comilla Victorians (C)	12	8	4	0	16	0.066
3	Chittagong Vikings (4)	12	7	5	0	14	−0.293
4	Dhaka Dynamites (R)	12	6	6	0	12	0.974
5	Rajshahi Kings	12	6	6	0	12	−0.518
6	Sylhet Sixers	12	5	7	0	10	0.066
7	Khulna Titans	12	2	10	0	4	−1.259

Source: Cricinfo.com
- advanced to the Qualifier 1
- advanced to the Eliminator

== Squad ==
- Ages are as of the first match of the tournament

No.	Name	Nationality	Birth date	Batting style	Bowling style	Year signed	Notes
Batsmen
3	Hazratullah Zazai	Afghanistan	23 March 1998 (aged 20)	Left-handed	Slow left-arm orthodox	2018	Overseas
7	Ian Bell	England	11 April 1982 (aged 36)	Right-handed	Right-arm medium	2018	Overseas
23	Mohammad Naim	Bangladesh	22 August 1999 (aged 19)	Left-handed	—	2018	
31	Rony Talukdar	Bangladesh	10 October 1990 (aged 28)	Right-handed	Right-arm slow-medium	2018	
44	Upul Tharanga	Sri Lanka	2 February 1985 (aged 33)	Left-handed	—	2018	Overseas
—	Mizanur Rahman	Bangladesh	30 July 1991 (aged 27)	Right-handed	Right-arm off break	2018	
—	Darwish Rasooli	Afghanistan	12 December 1999 (aged 19)	Right-handed	Right-arm off break	2018	Overseas
All-rounders
6	Luke Wright	England	7 March 1985 (aged 33)	Right-handed	Right-arm medium-fast	2018	Overseas
12	Andre Russell	West Indies	29 April 1988 (aged 30)	Right-handed	Right-arm fast-medium	2016	Overseas
51	Shuvagata Hom	Bangladesh	11 November 1986 (aged 32)	Right-handed	Right-arm off break	2018	
52	Rovman Powell	West Indies	23 July 1993 (aged 25)	Right-handed	Right-arm medium-fast	2017	Overseas
55	Kieron Pollard	West Indies	12 May 1987 (aged 31)	Right-handed	Right-arm medium-fast	2017	Overseas
74	Sunil Narine	West Indies	26 May 1988 (aged 30)	Left-handed	Right-arm off break	2017	Overseas
75	Shakib Al Hasan	Bangladesh	24 March 1987 (aged 31)	Left-handed	Slow left-arm orthodox	2016	Captain
—	Mahmudul Hasan	Bangladesh	10 December 1990 (aged 28)	Right-handed	Right-arm off break	2018	
Wicket-keepers
18	Nurul Hasan	Bangladesh	21 November 1993 (aged 25)	Right-handed	—	2018	
20	Heino Kuhn	South Africa	1 April 1984 (aged 34)	Right-handed	—	2018	Overseas
Bowlers
9	Andrew Birch	South Africa	7 June 1985 (aged 33)	Right-handed	Right-arm medium-fast	2018	Overseas
34	Rubel Hossain	Bangladesh	1 January 1990 (aged 29)	Right-handed	Right arm fast	2018	
44	Asif Hasan	Bangladesh	24 July 1993 (aged 25)	Right-handed	Right-arm medium-fast	2018	
45	Qazi Onik	Bangladesh	18 March 1999 (aged 19)	Right-handed	Left arm fast	2018	
47	Aliss Islam	Bangladesh	12 December 1996 (aged 22)	Right-handed	Right-arm off break	2018	
59	Shahadat Hossain	Bangladesh	7 August 1986 (aged 32)	Right-handed	Right-arm medium-fast	2018	
—	Mohor Sheikh	Bangladesh	21 March 1997 (aged 21)	Right-handed	Right-arm medium-fast	2018	
