= Bangladeshi cricket team in Sri Lanka in 2019 =

International cricket tour

	Sri Lanka	Bangladesh
- Dates: 23 – 31 July 2019
Captains	Dimuth Karunaratne	Tamim Iqbal

One Day International series
- Results: Sri Lanka won the 3-match series 3–0
Most runs	Angelo Mathews (187)	Mushfiqur Rahim (175)
Most wickets	Nuwan Pradeep (5)	Shafiul Islam (6)
- Player of the series: Angelo Mathews (SL)

The Bangladesh cricket team toured Sri Lanka in July 2019 to play three One Day International (ODI) matches. Originally, the tour was scheduled to take place in December 2019, but it was moved to avoid clashing with the 2019–20 Bangladesh Premier League tournament.

On 11 May 2019, the Bangladesh Cricket Board (BCB) President Nazmul Hasan Papon stated that the Bangladesh team was unlikely to proceed with a planned tour to Sri Lanka in July, citing fears that the country could be hit by another terrorist attack, following the Easter bombings on 21 April 2019. On 27 June 2019, it was reported that four National Security Intelligence (NSI) personnel, the civilian intelligence agency of Bangladesh, were sent to Sri Lanka to assess the situation. On 8 July 2019, Sri Lanka Cricket confirmed that the tour would go ahead, with all three matches played at the R. Premadasa Stadium in Colombo.

For the series, Sri Lanka named a squad of twenty-two players, which was later trimmed down to the final squad of seventeen. Chief Selector, Ashantha de Mel, said this would allow them to experiment with the line-ups for each match on an individual basis. Prior to the series, Bangladesh's captain Mashrafe Mortaza was ruled out of the tour due to a hamstring injury. Tamim Iqbal was named as captain for the first time in ODIs.

Sri Lankan bowler Lasith Malinga retired from ODIs following the first match of the series in Colombo. He took a wicket with his final ball, finishing his career as the ninth-highest wicket-taker in ODIs, with 338 dismissals. Sri Lanka Cricket announced that the final ODI was dedicated to Sri Lankan bowler Nuwan Kulasekara, who retired from international cricket before the series.

Sri Lanka won the first two ODI matches, therefore taking an unassailable lead and winning the series. It was their first ODI series win at home since beating the West Indies 3–0 in November 2015. Sri Lanka won the third match by 122 runs to win the series 3–0.

== Squads ==
ODIs
Sri Lanka	Bangladesh
Dimuth Karunaratne (c); Akila Dananjaya; Avishka Fernando; Wanindu Hasaranga; Shehan Jayasuriya; Lahiru Kumara; Angelo Mathews; Lasith Malinga; Kusal Mendis (wk); Kusal Perera (wk); Thisara Perera; Nuwan Pradeep; Kasun Rajitha; Dasun Shanaka; Dhananjaya de Silva; Lahiru Thirimanne; Isuru Udana	Tamim Iqbal (c); ~~Mashrafe Mortaza (c)~~; Taskin Ahmed; Anamul Haque; Mehedi Hasan; Mosaddek Hossain; Rubel Hossain; Shafiul Islam; Taijul Islam; Mahmudullah; Mohammad Mithun; Mushfiqur Rahim (wk); Mustafizur Rahman; Sabbir Rahman; Farhad Reza; Soumya Sarkar; ~~Mohammad Saifuddin~~

Ahead of the series, Mashrafe Mortaza and Mohammad Saifuddin were ruled out of Bangladesh's squad due to injury and were replaced by Farhad Reza and Taskin Ahmed respectively. On 23 July 2019, Shafiul Islam was added to Bangladesh's squad.

Amila Aponso, Niroshan Dickwella, Danushka Gunathilaka, Lakshan Sandakan, Lahiru Madushanka were named in Sri Lanka's initial twenty-two man squad, but did not make the final seventeen cricketers for the series.

== Tour match ==
23 July 2019
09:45
Scorecard

Sri Lanka Cricket Board President's XI; 282/8 (50 overs)	v	Bangladesh; 285/5 (48.1 overs)
Dasun Shanaka 86* (63); Soumya Sarkar 2/29 (6 overs)		Mohammad Mithun 91 (100); Lahiru Kumara 2/26 (6 overs)

Bangladesh won by 5 wickets
P. Sara Oval, Colombo
Umpires: Asanga Jayasooriya (SL) and Ravindra Kottahachchi (SL)

- Sri Lanka Cricket Board President's XI won the toss and elected to bat.

== ODI series ==
=== 1st ODI ===
26 July 2019
14:30 (D/N)
Scorecard

Sri Lanka; 314/8 (50 overs)	v	Bangladesh; 223 (41.4 overs)
Kusal Perera 111 (99); Shafiul Islam 3/62 (9 overs)		Mushfiqur Rahim 67 (86); Lasith Malinga 3/38 (9.4 overs)

Sri Lanka won by 91 runs
R. Premadasa Stadium, Colombo
Umpires: Nitin Menon (Ind) and Raveendra Wimalasiri (SL)
Player of the match: Kusal Perera (SL)

- Sri Lanka won the toss and elected to bat.
- Tamim Iqbal captained Bangladesh for the first time in ODIs.
- Lasith Malinga (SL) played in his final ODI.

=== 2nd ODI ===
28 July 2019
14:30 (D/N)
Scorecard

Bangladesh; 238/8 (50 overs)	v	Sri Lanka; 242/3 (44.4 overs)
Mushfiqur Rahim 98* (110); Akila Dananjaya 2/39 (10 overs)		Avishka Fernando 82 (75); Mustafizur Rahman 2/50 (8 overs)

Sri Lanka won by 7 wickets
R. Premadasa Stadium, Colombo
Umpires: Marais Erasmus (SA) and Lyndon Hannibal (SL)
Player of the match: Avishka Fernando (SL)

- Bangladesh won the toss and elected to bat.
- Mushfiqur Rahim (Ban) scored his 6,000th run in ODIs.

=== 3rd ODI ===
31 July 2019
14:30 (D/N)
Scorecard

Sri Lanka; 294/8 (50 overs)	v	Bangladesh; 172 (36 overs)
Angelo Mathews 87 (90); Soumya Sarkar 3/56 (9 overs)		Soumya Sarkar 69 (86); Dasun Shanaka 3/27 (6 overs)

Sri Lanka won by 122 runs
R. Premadasa Stadium, Colombo
Umpires: Nitin Menon (Ind) and Raveendra Wimalasiri (SL)
Player of the match: Angelo Mathews (SL)

- Sri Lanka won the toss and elected to bat.
- The match was dedicated to Sri Lankan cricketer Nuwan Kulasekara, who retired before the series.

== Statistics ==
=== Most runs ===
Rank	Runs	Player	Innings	Average	High Score	100	50
1	187	(Sri Lanka) Angelo Mathews	3	93.50	87	0	2
2	183	(Sri Lanka) Kusal Perera	3	61.00	111	1	0
3	175	(Bangladesh) Mushfiqur Rahim	3	87.50	98*	0	2
4	138	(Sri Lanka) Kusal Mendis	3	69.00	54	0	1
5	97	(Sri Lanka) Dimuth Karunaratne	3	32.33	46	0	0
Last Updated: 1 December 2019

=== Most wickets ===
Rank	Wickets	Player	Innings	Best	Average	Economy
1	6	(Bangladesh) Shafiul Islam	3	3/62	26.50	6.62
2	5	(Sri Lanka) Nuwan Pradeep	2	3/51	20.80	5.47
3	4	(Bangladesh) Soumya Sarkar	3	3/56	22.25	5.56
3	4	(Bangladesh) Mustafizur Rahman	2	2/50	31.25	6.94
3	3	(Sri Lanka) Dasun Shanaka	1	3/27	9.00	4.50
3	3	(Sri Lanka) Lasith Malinga	1	3/38	12.66	3.93
3	3	(Sri Lanka) Akila Dhananjaya	2	2/39	27.66	4.15
3	3	(Sri Lanka) Lahiru Kumara	3	2/26	54.00	5.13
Last Updated: 1 December 2019

New Zealand cricket team in Sri Lanka in 2019
