= 2019 Comilla Victorians season =

Franchise cricket team based in Comilla, Bangladesh

Comilla Victorians
2018–19 Bangladesh Premier League season
- Coach: Mohammad Salahuddin
- Captain: Imrul Kayes
- BPL: Champions
- Most runs: Tamim Iqbal (467)
- Most wickets: Mohammad Saifuddin (20)
- Most catches: Tamim Iqbal (9)
- Most wicket-keeping dismissals: Anamul Haque (9)

The Comilla Victorians are a franchise cricket team based in Comilla, Bangladesh, which plays in the Bangladesh Premier League (BPL). Captained by Imrul Kayes, they were one of seven teams that competed in the 2018–19 Bangladesh Premier League.

== Icon player ==
Tamim Iqbal remained the team's icon player from the previous season as he was retained before the draft.

== Points table ==
Pos	Team	Pld	W	L	NR	Pts	NRR
1	Rangpur Riders (3)	12	8	4	0	16	1.018
2	Comilla Victorians (C)	12	8	4	0	16	0.066
3	Chittagong Vikings (4)	12	7	5	0	14	−0.293
4	Dhaka Dynamites (R)	12	6	6	0	12	0.974
5	Rajshahi Kings	12	6	6	0	12	−0.518
6	Sylhet Sixers	12	5	7	0	10	0.066
7	Khulna Titans	12	2	10	0	4	−1.259

Source: Cricinfo.com
- advanced to the Qualifier 1
- advanced to the Eliminator

== Squad ==
- Ages are given as of the first match of the tournament

No.	Name	Nationality	2019|01|05	Batting style	Bowling style	Year signed	Notes
Batsmen
17	Evin Lewis	West Indies	27 December 1991 (aged 27)	Left-handed	Right-arm medium	2018	Overseas
28	Tamim Iqbal	Bangladesh	20 March 1989 (aged 29)	Left-handed	—	2017	
45	Imrul Kayes	Bangladesh	2 February 1987 (aged 31)	Left-handed	—	2015	Captain
49	Steve Smith	Australia	2 June 1989 (aged 29)	Right-handed	Right-arm leg break	2018	Overseas
80	Shamsur Rahman	Bangladesh	5 June 1988 (aged 30)	Right-handed	Right-arm off break	2018	
All-rounders
1	Thisara Perera	Sri Lanka	3 April 1989 (aged 29)	Left-handed	Right-arm medium	2018	Overseas
10	Shahid Afridi	Pakistan	1 February 1980 (aged 38)	Right-handed	Right-arm leg break	2018	Overseas
14	Asela Gunaratne	Sri Lanka	8 January 1986 (aged 32)	Right-handed	Right-arm medium	2018	Overseas
18	Shoaib Malik	Pakistan	1 February 1982 (aged 36)	Right-handed	Right-arm off break	2015	Overseas
34	Aamer Yamin	Pakistan	26 June 1990 (aged 28)	Left-handed	Right-arm medium-fast	2018	Overseas
41	Ziaur Rahman	Bangladesh	3 December 1986 (aged 32)	Right-handed	Right-arm medium	2018	
55	Mahedi Hasan	Bangladesh	12 December 1994 (aged 24)	Right-handed	Right-arm off break	2017	
74	Mohammad Saifuddin	Bangladesh	1 November 1996 (aged 22)	Left-handed	Right-arm medium-fast	2016	
83	Liam Dawson	England	1 March 1990 (aged 28)	Right-handed	Slow left-arm orthodox	2018	Overseas
Wicket-keepers
66	Anamul Haque	Bangladesh	16 December 1990 (aged 28)	Right-handed	—	2018	
Bowlers
16	Abu Hider	Bangladesh	14 February 1996 (aged 22)	Right-handed	Left-arm medium-fast	2018	
25	Mohammad Shahid	Bangladesh	1 November 1988 (aged 30)	Right-handed	Right-arm medium-fast	2018	
47	Wahab Riaz	Pakistan	28 June 1985 (aged 33)	Right-handed	Left-arm fast	2019	Overseas
70	Mosharraf Hossain	Bangladesh	20 November 1981 (aged 37)	Left-handed	Slow left-arm orthodox	2018	
97	Sanjit Saha	Bangladesh	4 November 1997 (aged 21)	Right-handed	Right-arm off break	2018	
—	Waqar Salamkheil	Afghanistan	2 October 2001 (aged 17)	Right-handed	Left-arm medium	2018	Overseas
