= 2018–19 Bangladesh Premier League =

Cricket Tournament

Bangladesh Premier League 2019
- 2019 BPL Logo
- Dates: 5 January 2019 – 8 February 2019
- Administrator: Bangladesh Cricket Board
- Cricket format: Twenty20
- Tournament format(s): Double round-robin and playoffs
- Host: Bangladesh
- Champions: Comilla Victorians (2nd title)
- Runners-up: Dhaka Dynamites
- Participants: 7
- Matches: 46
- Player of the series: Shakib Al Hasan (Dhaka Dynamites)
- Most runs: Rilee Rossouw (Rangpur Riders) (558)
- Most wickets: Shakib Al Hasan (Dhaka Dynamites) (23)
- Official website: BPL

The Bangladesh Premier League 2019, also known as BPL Season 6 or UCB BPL 2019 Powered by TVS (for sponsorship reasons), was the sixth season of the Bangladesh Premier League (BPL), the top level professional Twenty20 cricket franchise league in Bangladesh. The competition was organised by the Bangladesh Cricket Board (BCB), featuring seven teams from seven cities. Teams were restricted to having four overseas players per side, instead of five in the previous edition of the tournament. Rangpur Riders were the defending champions.

Originally, the season was scheduled to start on 1 October 2018 and end on 16 November 2018. However, in May 2018, it was reported that the tournament might be moved to January 2019, because of security concerns around the Bangladeshi general election, which took place in December 2018. In July 2018, it was confirmed that the tournament would start in January 2019. For this edition of the tournament, the Decision Review System (DRS) were used for the first time.

In the final match, Comilla Victorians defeated Dhaka Dynamites by 17 runs to win their second title. In the final match, Tamim Iqbal was awarded the man of the match award, after scoring 141 not out. Rilee Rossouw was the leading run scorer in the tournament with 558 runs. Shakib Al Hasan was the leading wicket taker with 22 wickets and also won the player of the tournament award.

== Draft and squads ==
By 30 September 2018 teams announced the names of their retained players and their icon players. A players' draft was initially scheduled to take place on 25 October 2018. However, the date was moved to 28 October due to a schedule clash with the ODI series between Bangladesh and Zimbabwe.

Teams added to their squads in the draft. Litton Das and Mustafizur Rahman were new additions to the list while Soumya Sarkar and Sabbir Rahman were excluded from the list. Initially, Steve Smith was barred from playing in the tournament by the Bangladesh Cricket Board (BCB). However, the BCB overturned its decision, allowing Smith to take part in the competition.

Chittagong Vikings Coach: Simon Helmot	Comilla Victorians Coach: Mohammad Salahuddin	Dhaka Dynamites Coach: Khaled Mahmud	Khulna Titans Coach: Mahela Jayawardene	Rajshahi Kings Coach: Lance Klusener	Rangpur Riders Coach: Tom Moody	Sylhet Sixers Coach: Waqar Younis
(Bangladesh) Mushfiqur Rahim (c); (New Zealand) Luke Ronchi; (Bangladesh) Sunzamul Islam; (Zimbabwe) Sikandar Raza; (Afghanistan) Mohammad Shahzad; (South Africa) Robert Frylinck; (Bangladesh) Mosaddek Hossain; (Bangladesh) Abu Jayed; (Bangladesh) Khaled Ahmed; (Bangladesh) Nayeem Hasan; (South Africa) Cameron Delport; (Sri Lanka) Dasun Shanaka; (Bangladesh) Mohammad Ashraful; (Bangladesh) Robiul Haque; (Bangladesh) Yasir Ali; (Bangladesh) Nihaduzzaman; (Afghanistan) Najibullah Zadran; (Bangladesh) Shadman Islam; (Bangladesh) Yeasin Arafat; (Bangladesh) Nazmul Hossain Milon; (South Africa) Hardus Viljoen	(Bangladesh) Imrul Kayes (c); (Australia) Steve Smith; (Bangladesh) Mohammad Saifuddin; (Pakistan) Shoaib Malik; (England) Liam Dawson; (Sri Lanka) Asela Gunaratne; (Bangladesh) Abu Hider; (Bangladesh) Anamul Haque; (Bangladesh) Sheikh Mahedi Hasan; (Bangladesh) Tamim Iqbal; (Bangladesh) Ziaur Rahman; (Pakistan) Shahid Afridi; (Sri Lanka) Thisara Perera; (Bangladesh) Mosharraf Hossain; (Bangladesh) Mohammad Shahid; (Bangladesh) Shamsur Rahman; (Bangladesh) Sanjit Saha; (Cricket West Indies) Evin Lewis; (Afghanistan) Waqar Salmakheil; (Pakistan) Aamer Yamin; (Pakistan) Wahab Riaz	(Bangladesh) Shakib Al Hasan (c); (Cricket West Indies) Sunil Narine; (Cricket West Indies) Rovman Powell; (Cricket West Indies) Kieron Pollard; (Cricket West Indies) Andre Russell; (Afghanistan) Hazratullah Zazai; (Bangladesh) Rubel Hossain; (Bangladesh) Nurul Hasan; (Bangladesh) Rony Talukdar; (Bangladesh) Shuvagata Hom; (South Africa) Andrew Birch; (England) Ian Bell; (Bangladesh) Qazi Onik; (Bangladesh) Mizanur Rahman; (Bangladesh) Asif Hasan; (Bangladesh) Shahadat Hossain; (Bangladesh) Mohammad Naim; (Bangladesh) Mohor Sheikh; (Bangladesh) Aliss Al Islam; (Afghanistan) Darwish Rasooli; (South Africa) Heino Kuhn; (Bangladesh) Mahmudul Hasan; (Sri Lanka) Upul Tharanga; (England) Luke Wright	(Bangladesh) Mahmudullah (c); (Bangladesh) Ariful Haque; (Bangladesh) Najmul Hossain Shanto; (Cricket West Indies) Carlos Brathwaite; (England) Dawid Malan; (United States) Ali Khan; (Bangladesh) Jahurul Islam; (Bangladesh) Shoriful Islam; (Bangladesh) Taijul Islam; (Bangladesh) Al Amin; (Afghanistan) Zahir Khan; (Cricket West Indies) Sherfane Rutherford; (Bangladesh) Subashis Roy; (Bangladesh) Junaid Siddique; (Bangladesh) Tanvir Islam; (Bangladesh) Mahidul Islam Ankon; (Bangladesh) Lasith Malinga; (Pakistan) Yasir Shah; (Zimbabwe) Brendan Taylor; (Ireland) Paul Stirling; (South Africa) David Wiese; (Pakistan) Junaid Khan; (Bangladesh) Saddam Hossain	(Bangladesh) Mehedi Hasan (c); (Bangladesh) Mominul Haque; (Bangladesh) Mustafizur Rahman; (Bangladesh) Zakir Hasan; (South Africa) Christiaan Jonker; (Afghanistan) Qais Ahmad; (Bangladesh) Soumya Sarkar; (Bangladesh) Fazle Mahmud; (Bangladesh) Arafat Sunny; (Bangladesh) Alauddin Babu; (Sri Lanka) Isuru Udana; (England) Laurie Evans; (Bangladesh) Marshall Ayub; (Bangladesh) Kamrul Islam Rabbi; (Netherlands) Ryan ten Doeschate; (Sri Lanka) Seekkuge Prasanna; (Pakistan) Mohammad Sami; (Bangladesh) Shahriar Nafees; (Pakistan) Mohammad Hafeez; (Cricket West Indies) Johnson Charles	(Bangladesh) Mashrafe Mortaza (c); (Cricket West Indies) Chris Gayle; (South Africa) AB de Villiers; (England) Alex Hales; (Bangladesh) Shafiul Islam; (Bangladesh) Sohag Gazi; (Bangladesh) Farhad Reza; (Bangladesh) Mohammad Mithun; (Bangladesh) Mehedi Maruf; (South Africa) Rilee Rossouw; (Bangladesh) Nahidul Islam; (Bangladesh) Nadif Chowdhury; (Bangladesh) Abul Hasan; Fardeen Hasan Ony; (England) Benny Howell; (Cricket West Indies) Oshane Thomas; (England) Ravi Bopara; (Zimbabwe) Sean Williams; (Cricket West Indies) Sheldon Cottrell; (Bangladesh) Shohidul Islam; (Bangladesh) Nazmul Islam; (Bangladesh) Minhajul Abedin Afridi	(Bangladesh) Alok Kapali (c); (Australia) David Warner; (Pakistan) Sohail Tanvir; (Bangladesh) Nasir Hossain; (Bangladesh) Sabbir Rahman; (Bangladesh) Litton Das; (Nepal) Sandeep Lamichhane; (Bangladesh) Afif Hossain; (Bangladesh) Taskin Ahmed; (Bangladesh) Al-Amin Hossain; (Bangladesh) Towhid Hridoy; (Cricket West Indies) Fabian Allen; (Pakistan) Mohammad Irfan; (Bangladesh) Nabil Samad; (Bangladesh) Ebadot Hossain; (Bangladesh) Jaker Ali; (Afghanistan) Gulbadin Naib; (Cricket West Indies) Andre Fletcher; (Bangladesh) Mehedi Hasan Rana; (England) Pat Brown; (Cricket West Indies) Nicholas Pooran; (South Africa) Imran Tahir; (Pakistan) Mohammad Nawaz; (South Africa) Wayne Parnell; (England) Jason Roy

== Venues ==
A total of 46 matches were played at three venues, with the playoffs and final held at Dhaka. Dhaka hosted 14 matches in the first phase of the competition, then Sylhet hosted eight matches, followed by a further six matches in Dhaka in the third phase, while Chittagong hosted 10 matches during the fourth phase.

Chittagong	Dhaka	Sylhet
Zohur Ahmed Chowdhury Stadium	Sher-e-Bangla Cricket Stadium	Sylhet International Cricket Stadium
Capacity: 20,000	Capacity: 26,000	Capacity: 18,500
Matches: 10	Matches: 28 (incl. Playoffs)	Matches: 8
Zahur Ahmed Chowdhury Stadium	Sher-e-Bangla National Cricket Stadium	Sylhet International Cricket Stadium
2018–19 Bangladesh Premier League is located in Bangladesh

== Results ==
=== Points table ===
Pos	Team	Pld	W	L	NR	Pts	NRR
1	Rangpur Riders (3)	12	8	4	0	16	1.018
2	Comilla Victorians (C)	12	8	4	0	16	0.066
3	Chittagong Vikings (4)	12	7	5	0	14	−0.293
4	Dhaka Dynamites (R)	12	6	6	0	12	0.974
5	Rajshahi Kings	12	6	6	0	12	−0.518
6	Sylhet Sixers	12	5	7	0	10	0.066
7	Khulna Titans	12	2	10	0	4	−1.259

Source: Cricinfo.com
- advanced to the Qualifier 1
- advanced to the Eliminator

=== League progression ===
	League matches												Playoffs		
Team	1	2	3	4	5	6	7	8	9	10	11	12	Q1/E	Q2	F
Chittagong Vikings	2	2	4	6	8	10	12	12	12	12	14	14	L		
Comilla Victorians	2	2	4	4	6	8	8	10	12	14	16	16	W		W
Dhaka Dynamites	2	4	6	8	8	10	10	10	10	10	10	12	W	W	L
Khulna Titans	0	0	0	0	2	2	2	2	4	4	4	4			
Rajshahi Kings	0	2	2	4	4	6	8	8	8	10	10	12			
Rangpur Riders	0	2	4	4	4	4	6	8	10	12	14	16	L	L	
Sylhet Sixers	0	2	2	2	4	4	4	4	6	8	8	10			

Win	Loss	No result

Note: The total points at the end of each group match are listed.
Note: Click on the points (group matches) or W/L (Playoffs) to see the match summary.

== League stage ==
A total of 42 matches were played in the league stage, with 24 matches played in Dhaka, 8 matches in Sylhet and 10 in Chittagong.

=== Phase 1 (Dhaka) ===
5 January 2019
12:30
Scorecard

Rangpur Riders; 98 (20 overs)	v	Chittagong Vikings; 101/7 (19.1 overs)
Ravi Bopara 44 (47); Robert Frylinck 4/14 (4 overs)		Mohammad Shahzad 27 (23); Mashrafe Mortaza 2/24 (4 overs)

Chittagong won by 3 wickets
Sher-e-Bangla National Cricket Stadium, Dhaka
Umpires: Sharfuddoula (Ban) and Alex Wharf (Eng)
Player of the match: Robert Frylinck (Chittagong Vikings)

- Chittagong Vikings won the toss and elected to field.

5 January 2019
17:20 (D/N)
Scorecard

Dhaka Dynamites; 189/5 (20 overs)	v	Rajshahi Kings; 106 (18.2 overs)
Hazratullah Zazai 78 (41); Arafat Sunny 2/23 (3 overs)		Mohammad Hafeez 29 (28); Rubel Hossain 3/7 (3 overs)

Dhaka won by 83 runs
Sher-e-Bangla National Cricket Stadium, Dhaka
Umpires: Ranmore Martinesz (SL) and Masudur Rahman (Ban)
Player of the match: Hazratullah Zazai (Dhaka Dynamites)

- Rajshahi Kings won the toss and elected to field.
- Mohor Sheikh (Dhaka Dynamites) made his T20 debut.

6 January 2019
12:30
Scorecard

Sylhet Sixers; 127/8 (20 overs)	v	Comilla Victorians; 130/6 (19.5 overs)
Nicholas Pooran 41 (26); Mohammad Saifuddin 2/13 (3 overs)		Shahid Afridi 39* (25); Sandeep Lamichhane 2/16 (4 overs)

Comilla won by 4 wickets
Sher-e-Bangla National Cricket Stadium, Dhaka
Umpires: Ranmore Martinesz (SL) and Masudur Rahman (Ban)
Player of the match: Shahid Afridi (Comilla Victorians)

- Comilla Victorians won the toss and elected to field.
- Towhid Hridoy (Sylhet Sixers) made his T20 debut.

6 January 2019
17:20 (D/N)
Scorecard

Rangpur Riders; 169/3 (20 overs)	v	Khulna Titans; 161/5 (20 overs)
Rilee Rossouw 76* (52); Zahir Khan 1/30 (4 overs)		Paul Stirling 61 (46); Shafiul Islam 2/44 (4 overs)

Rangpur won by 8 runs
Sher-e-Bangla National Cricket Stadium, Dhaka
Umpires: Sharfuddoula (Ban) and Alex Wharf (Eng)
Player of the match: Rilee Rossouw (Rangpur Riders)

- Khulna Titans won the toss and elected to field.

8 January 2019
12:30
Scorecard

Dhaka Dynamites; 192/6 (20 overs)	v	Khulna Titans; 87 (13 overs)
Hazratullah Zazai 57 (36); Paul Stirling 2/2 (1 over)		Junaid Siddique 31 (16); Shakib Al Hasan 3/18 (3 overs)

Dhaka won by 105 runs
Sher-e-Bangla National Cricket Stadium, Dhaka
Umpires: Nadir Shah (Ban) and Alex Wharf (Eng)
Player of the match: Hazratullah Zazai (Dhaka Dynamites)

- Khulna Titans won the toss and elected to field.

8 January 2019
17:20 (D/N)
Scorecard

Comilla Victorians; 63 (16.2 overs)	v	Rangpur Riders; 67/1 (12 overs)
Shahid Afridi 25 (18); Mashrafe Mortaza 4/11 (4 overs)		Mehedi Maruf 36* (39); Abu Hider 1/11 (3 overs)

Rangpur won by 9 wickets
Sher-e-Bangla National Cricket Stadium, Dhaka
Umpires: Ranmore Martinesz (SL) and Mahfuzur Rahman (Ban)
Player of the match: Mashrafe Mortaza (Rangpur Riders)

- Rangpur Riders won the toss and elected to field.

9 January 2019
12:30
Scorecard

Sylhet Sixers; 168/5 (20 overs)	v	Chittagong Vikings; 163/7 (20 overs)
David Warner 59 (47); Robert Frylinck 3/26 (4 overs)		Robert Frylinck 44* (24); Taskin Ahmed 4/28 (4 overs)

Sylhet won by 5 runs
Sher-e-Bangla National Cricket Stadium, Dhaka
Umpires: Ranmore Martinesz (SL) and Mahfuzur Rahman (Ban)
Player of the match: Nicholas Pooran (Sylhet Sixers)

- Sylhet Sixers won the toss and elected to bat.

9 January 2019
17:20 (D/N)
Scorecard

Khulna Titans; 117/9 (20 overs)	v	Rajshahi Kings; 118/3 (18.5 overs)
Junaid Siddique 23 (18); Isuru Udana 3/15 (4 overs)		Mehedi Hasan 51 (45); Paul Stirling 1/9 (2 overs)

Rajshahi won by 7 wickets
Sher-e-Bangla National Cricket Stadium, Dhaka
Umpires: Nadir Shah (Ban) and Alex Wharf (Eng)
Player of the match: Isuru Udana (Rajshahi Kings)

- Khulna Titans won the toss and elected to bat.

11 January 2019
14:00 (D/N)
Scorecard

Dhaka Dynamites; 183/9 (20 overs)	v	Rangpur Riders; 181/9 (20 overs)
Kieron Pollard 62 (26); Shafiul Islam 3/35 (4 overs)		Rilee Rossouw 83 (44); Aliss Islam 4/26 (4 overs)

Dhaka won by 2 runs
Sher-e-Bangla National Cricket Stadium, Dhaka
Umpires: Ranmore Martinesz (SL) and Masudur Rahman (Ban)
Player of the match: Aliss Islam (Dhaka Dynamites)

- Rangpur Riders won the toss and elected to field.
- Aliss Islam (Dhaka Dynamites) made his T20 debut and took a hat-trick.

11 January 2019
19:00 (D/N)
Scorecard

Rajshahi Kings; 124 (18.5 overs)	v	Comilla Victorians; 130/5 (18.4 overs)
Isuru Udana 32 (30); Shahid Afridi 3/10 (4 overs)		Anamul Haque 40 (32); Qais Ahmad 1/21 (4 overs)

Comilla won by 5 wickets
Sher-e-Bangla National Cricket Stadium, Dhaka
Umpires: Morshed Ali Khan (Ban) and Alex Wharf (Eng)
Player of the match: Shahid Afridi (Comilla Victorians)

- Comilla Victorians won the toss and elected to field.

12 January 2019
13:30
Scorecard

Khulna Titans; 151/6 (20 overs)	v	Chittagong Vikings; 151/8 (20 overs)
Dawid Malan 45 (43); Sunzamul Islam 2/37 (4 overs)		Yasir Ali 41 (34); Carlos Brathwaite 2/30 (4 overs)

Match tied; Chittagong won the Super Over
Sher-e-Bangla National Cricket Stadium, Dhaka
Umpires: Morshed Ali Khan (Ban) and Ranmore Martinesz (SL)
Player of the match: Robert Frylinck (Chittagong Vikings)

- Chittagong Vikings won the toss and elected to field.
- Mahidul Islam Ankon (Khulna Titans) made his T20 debut.

12 January 2019
18:30 (D/N)
Scorecard

Dhaka Dynamites; 173/7 (20 overs)	v	Sylhet Sixers; 141/9 (20 overs)
Rony Talukdar 58 (34); Taskin Ahmed 3/38 (4 overs)		Nicholas Pooran 72 (47); Rubel Hossain 3/22 (3 overs)

Dhaka won by 32 runs
Sher-e-Bangla National Cricket Stadium, Dhaka
Umpires: Mahfuzur Rahman (Ban) and Alex Wharf (Eng)
Player of the match: Rony Talukdar (Dhaka Dynamites)

- Dhaka Dynamites won the toss and elected to bat.
- Mohammad Naim (Dhaka Dynamites) made his T20 debut.

13 January 2019
13:30
Scorecard

Rajshahi Kings; 135/8 (20 overs)	v	Rangpur Riders; 129/6 (20 overs)
Zakir Hasan 42* (36); Farhad Reza 2/17 (2 overs)		Rilee Rossouw 44* (45); Mohammad Hafeez 2/22 (4 overs)

Rajshahi won by 5 runs
Sher-e-Bangla National Cricket Stadium, Dhaka
Umpires: Ranmore Martinesz (SL) and Sharfuddoula (Ban)
Player of the match: Zakir Hasan (Rajshahi Kings)

- Rangpur Riders won the toss and elected to field.

13 January 2019
18:30 (D/N)
Scorecard

Comilla Victorians; 184/5 (20 overs)	v	Chittagong Vikings; 186/6 (19.4 overs)
Thisara Perera 74* (26); Khaled Ahmed 3/34 (4 overs)		Mushfiqur Rahim 75 (41); Mohammad Saifuddin 3/45 (4 overs)

Chittagong won by 4 wickets
Sher-e-Bangla National Cricket Stadium, Dhaka
Umpires: Nadir Shah (Ban) and Alex Wharf (Eng)
Player of the match: Mushfiqur Rahim (Chittagong Vikings)

- Chittagong Vikings won the toss and elected to field.

=== Phase 2 (Sylhet) ===
15 January 2019
13:30
Scorecard

Khulna Titans; 128/9 (20 overs)	v	Rajshahi Kings; 103 (19.5 overs)
Ariful Haque 26 (27); Mehedi Hasan 2/21 (4 overs)		Mehedi Hasan 23 (16); Taijul Islam 3/10 (4 overs)

Khulna won by 25 runs
Sylhet International Cricket Stadium, Sylhet
Umpires: Tanvir Ahmed (Ban) and Alex Wharf (Eng)
Player of the match: Taijul Islam (Khulna Titans)

- Khulna Titans won the toss and elected to bat.

15 January 2019
18:30 (D/N)
Scorecard

Sylhet Sixers; 68 (14.5 overs)	v	Comilla Victorians; 69/2 (11.1 overs)
Alok Kapali 33* (31); Mahedi Hasan 4/22 (4 overs)		Shamsur Rahman 34* (37); Sohail Tanvir 1/10 (3 overs)

Comilla won by 8 wickets
Sylhet International Cricket Stadium, Sylhet
Umpires: Ranmore Martinesz (SL) and Masudur Rahman (Ban)
Player of the match: Mahedi Hasan (Comilla Victorians)

- Comilla Victorians won the toss and elected to field.

16 January 2019
13:30
Scorecard

Rajshahi Kings; 136/6 (20 overs)	v	Dhaka Dynamites; 116/9 (20 overs)
Marshall Ayub 45 (31); Sunil Narine 3/19 (4 overs)		Nurul Hasan 21 (14); Arafat Sunny 3/8 (4 overs)

Rajshahi won by 20 runs
Sylhet International Cricket Stadium, Sylhet
Umpires: Mahfuzur Rahman (Ban) and Alex Wharf (Eng)
Player of the match: Arafat Sunny (Rajshahi Kings)

- Rajshahi Kings won the toss and elected to bat.

16 January 2019
18:30 (D/N)
Scorecard

Sylhet Sixers; 187/5 (20 overs)	v	Rangpur Riders; 160/6 (20 overs)
Litton Das 70 (43); Shafiul Islam 3/31 (4 overs)		Rilee Rossouw 58 (32); Taskin Ahmed 2/34 (4 overs)

Sylhet won by 27 runs
Sylhet International Cricket Stadium, Sylhet
Umpires: Ranmore Martinesz (SL) and Masudur Rahman (Ban)
Player of the match: Litton Das (Sylhet Sixers)

- Rangpur Riders won the toss and elected to field.
- Jaker Ali (Sylhet Sixers) made his T20 debut.

18 January 2019
14:00 (D/N)
Scorecard

Sylhet Sixers; 158/8 (20 overs)	v	Dhaka Dynamites; 163/4 (20 overs)
David Warner 63 (43); Andrew Birch 3/42 (4 overs)		Shakib Al Hasan 61* (41); Mohammad Irfan 2/38 (4 overs)

Dhaka won by 6 wickets
Sylhet International Cricket Stadium, Sylhet
Umpires: Ranmore Martinesz (SL) and Masudur Rahman (Ban)
Player of the match: Shakib Al Hasan (Dhaka Dynamites)

- Sylhet Sixers won the toss and elected to bat.

18 January 2019
19:00 (D/N)
Scorecard

Khulna Titans; 181/7 (20 overs)	v	Comilla Victorians; 186/7 (19.4 overs)
Junaid Siddique 70 (41); Shahid Afridi 3/35 (4 overs)		Tamim Iqbal 73 (42); Junaid Khan 4/32 (4 overs)

Comilla won by 3 wickets
Sylhet International Cricket Stadium, Sylhet
Umpires: Gazi Sohel (Ban) and Alex Wharf (Eng)
Player of the match: Tamim Iqbal (Comilla Victorians)

- Comilla Victorians won the toss and elected to field.

19 January 2019
13:30
Scorecard

Sylhet Sixers; 194/4 (20 overs)	v	Rangpur Riders; 195/6 (19.3 overs)
Sabbir Rahman 85 (51); Mashrafe Mortaza 2/31 (4 overs)		Rilee Rossouw 61 (35); Taskin Ahmed 4/42 (4 overs)

Rangpur won by 4 wickets
Sylhet International Cricket Stadium, Sylhet
Umpires: Gazi Sohel (Ban) and Alex Wharf (Eng)
Player of the match: Rilee Rossouw (Rangpur Riders)

- Rangpur Riders won the toss and elected to field.

19 January 2019
18:30 (D/N)
Scorecard

Chittagong Vikings; 214/4 (20 overs)	v	Khulna Titans; 188/8 (20 overs)
Yasir Ali 54 (36); David Wiese 2/26 (4 overs)		Mahmudullah 50 (26); Abu Jayed 3/33 (4 overs)

Chittagong won by 26 runs
Sylhet International Cricket Stadium, Sylhet
Umpires: Tanvir Ahmed (Ban) and Ranmore Martinesz (SL)
Player of the match: Mushfiqur Rahim (Chittagong Vikings)

- Khulna Titans won the toss and elected to field.

=== Phase 3 (Dhaka) ===
21 January 2019
13:30
Scorecard

Rajshahi Kings; 176/3 (20 overs)	v	Comilla Victorians; 138 (18.2 overs)
Laurie Evans 104* (62); Liam Dawson 2/20 (4 overs)		Anamul Haque 26 (23); Kamrul Islam Rabbi 4/10 (3 overs)

Rajshahi won by 38 runs
Sher-e-Bangla National Cricket Stadium, Dhaka
Umpires: Shozab Raza (Pak) and Sharfuddoula (Ban)
Player of the match: Laurie Evans (Rajshahi Kings)

- Comilla Victorians won the toss and elected to field.
- Laurie Evans (Rajshahi Kings) scored his first century in T20 cricket.

21 January 2019
18:30 (D/N)
Scorecard

Dhaka Dynamites; 139/9 (20 overs)	v	Chittagong Vikings; 145/7 (19.5 overs)
Shakib Al Hasan 34 (34); Cameron Delport 3/25 (4 overs)		Mosaddek Hossain 33 (39); Shakib Al Hasan 4/16 (4 overs)

Chittagong won by 3 wickets
Sher-e-Bangla National Cricket Stadium, Dhaka
Umpires: Ranmore Martinesz (SL) and Nadir Shah (Ban)
Player of the match: Robert Frylinck (Chittagong Vikings)

- Dhaka Dynamites won the toss and elected to bat.

22 January 2019
13:30
Scorecard

Khulna Titans; 181/6 (20 overs)	v	Rangpur Riders; 183/4 (19.3 overs)
Najmul Hossain Shanto 48 (35); Farhad Reza 4/32 (4 overs)		Alex Hales 55 (29); Yasir Shah 2/47 (3.3 overs)

Rangpur won by 6 wickets
Sher-e-Bangla National Cricket Stadium, Dhaka
Umpires: Shozab Raza (Pak) and Sharfuddoula (Ban)
Player of the match: Farhad Reza (Rangpur Riders)

- Rangpur Riders won the toss and elected to field.
- Chris Gayle (Rangpur Riders) became the first batsman to hit 900 sixes in T20 Cricket.

22 January 2019
18:30 (D/N)
Scorecard

Comilla Victorians; 153/8 (20 overs)	v	Dhaka Dynamites; 146/9 (20 overs)
Shamsur Rahman 48 (35); Shakib Al Hasan 3/24 (4 overs)		Andre Russell 46 (24); Thisara Perera 3/14 (3 overs)

Comilla won by 7 runs
Sher-e-Bangla National Cricket Stadium, Dhaka
Umpires: Ranmore Martinesz (SL) and Mahfuzur Rahman (Ban)
Player of the match: Thisara Perera (Comilla Victorians)

- Dhaka Dynamites won the toss and elected to field.
- Shakib Al Hasan (Dhaka Dynamites) became first bowler to take 100 wickets in the BPL.

23 January 2019
13:30
Scorecard

Rajshahi Kings; 157/5 (20 overs)	v	Chittagong Vikings; 159/4 (19.4 overs)
Laurie Evans 74 (56); Khaled Ahmed 2/30 (4 overs)		Mushfiqur Rahim 64* (46); Arafat Sunny 3/22 (4 overs)

Chittagong won by 6 wickets
Sher-e-Bangla National Cricket Stadium, Dhaka
Umpires: Ranmore Martinesz (SL) and Nadir Shah (Ban)
Player of the match: Mushfiqur Rahim (Chittagong Vikings)

- Chittagong Vikings won the toss and elected to field.

23 January 2019
18:30 (D/N)
Scorecard

Khulna Titans; 170/9 (20 overs)	v	Sylhet Sixers; 149/7 (20 overs)
Brendan Taylor 48 (31); Alok Kapali 4/22 (4 overs)		Mohammad Nawaz 54 (34); Taijul Islam 3/32 (4 overs)

Khulna won by 21 runs
Sher-e-Bangla National Cricket Stadium, Dhaka
Umpires: Morshed Ali Khan (Ban) and Alex Wharf (Ban)
Player of the match: David Wiese (Khulna Titans)

- Sylhet Sixers won the toss and elected to field.

=== Phase 4 (Chittagong) ===
25 January 2019
14:00
Scorecard

Sylhet Sixers; 180/6 (20 overs)	v	Rajshahi Kings; 104 (18.2 overs)
Jason Roy 42 (28); Mustafizur Rahman 2/43 (4 overs)		Fazle Mahmud 50 (41); Sohail Tanvir 3/17 (4 overs)

Sylhet won by 76 runs
Zohur Ahmed Chowdhury Stadium, Chittagong
Umpires: Morshed Ali Khan (Ban) and Shozab Raza (Pak)
Player of the match: Sohail Tanvir (Sylhet Sixers)

- Rajshahi Kings won the toss and elected to field.

25 January 2019
19:00 (D/N)
Scorecard

Rangpur Riders; 239/4 (20 overs)	v	Chittagong Vikings; 167/8 (20 overs)
Alex Hales 100 (48); Abu Jayed 2/35 (4 overs)		Yasir Ali 78 (48); Mashrafe Mortaza 3/34 (4 overs)

Rangpur won by 72 runs
Zohur Ahmed Chowdhury Stadium, Chittagong
Umpires: Sharfuddoula (Ban) and Alex Wharf (Eng)
Player of the match: Alex Hales (Rangpur Riders)

- Chittagong Vikings won the toss and elected to field.
- Robiul Haque (Chittagong Vikings) made his T20 debut.
- Rangpur Riders recorded highest ever team total in BPL history.
- Rilee Rossouw and Alex Hales (Rangpur Riders) both scored century, making it only third instances in T20 history of two batsmen scored hundreds in the same team innings.

26 January 2019
13:30
Scorecard

Sylhet Sixers; 195/4 (20 overs)	v	Khulna Titans; 137 (18.1 overs)
Afif Hossain 49 (37); Taijul Islam 3/30 (4 overs)		Brendan Taylor 34 (23); Nabil Samad 3/20 (4 overs)

Sylhet won by 58 runs
Zohur Ahmed Chowdhury Stadium, Chittagong
Umpires: Gazi Sohel (Ban) and Alex Wharf (Eng)
Player of the match: Mohammad Nawaz (Sylhet Sixers)

- Sylhet Sixers won the toss and elected to bat.

26 January 2019
18:30 (D/N)
Scorecard

Rajshahi Kings; 198/5 (20 overs)	v	Chittagong Vikings; 191/8 (20 overs)
Johnson Charles 55 (43); Khaled Ahmed 2/32 (4 overs)		Yasir Ali 58 (38); Mustafizur Rahman 3/28 (4 overs)

Rajshahi won by 7 runs
Zohur Ahmed Chowdhury Stadium, Chittagong
Umpires: Shozab Raza (Pak) and Sharfuddoula (Ban)
Player of the match: Mustafizur Rahman (Rajshahi Kings)

- Chittagong Vikings won the toss and elected to field.

28 January 2019
13:30
Scorecard

Comilla Victorians; 237/5 (20 overs)	v	Khulna Titans; 157 (18.5 overs)
Evin Lewis 109* (49); Mahmudullah 2/32 (4 overs)		Brendan Taylor 50 (33); Wahab Riaz 3/14 (2.5 overs)

Comilla won by 80 runs
Zohur Ahmed Chowdhury Stadium, Chittagong
Umpires: Tanvir Ahmed (Ban) and Shozab Raza (Pak)
Player of the match: Evin Lewis (Comilla Victorians)

- Khulna Titans won the toss and elected to field.
- Wahab Riaz (Comilla Victorians) took a hat-trick.

28 January 2019
18:30 (D/N)
Scorecard

Dhaka Dynamites; 186/6 (20 overs)	v	Rangpur Riders; 189/2 (18.2 overs)
Rony Talukdar 52 (32); Farhad Reza 2/32 (3 overs)		AB de Villiers 100* (50); Andre Russell 2/30 (3 overs)

Rangpur won by 8 wickets
Zohur Ahmed Chowdhury Stadium, Chittagong
Umpires: Ranmore Martinesz (SL) and Masudur Rahman (Ban)
Player of the match: AB de Villiers (Rangpur Riders)

- Dhaka Dynamites won the toss and elected to bat.

29 January 2019
13:30
Scorecard

Chittagong Vikings; 116/8 (19 overs)	v	Comilla Victorians; 117/3 (16.4 overs)
Mosaddek Hossain 43* (25); Shahid Afridi 2/10 (4 overs)		Tamim Iqbal 54* (51); Abu Jayed 2/25 (4 overs)

Comilla won by 7 wickets
Zohur Ahmed Chowdhury Stadium, Chittagong
Umpires: Ranmore Martinesz (SL) and Mahfuzur Rahman (Ban)
Player of the match: Shahid Afridi (Comilla Victorians)

- Chittagong Vikings won the toss and elected to bat.
- The match was reduced to 19 overs per side due to rain.

29 January 2019
18:30 (D/N)
Scorecard

Rajshahi Kings; 141/8 (20 overs)	v	Rangpur Riders; 145/4 (18.4 overs)
Laurie Evans 35 (31); Farhad Reza 3/30 (4 overs)		Rilee Rossouw 55 (43); Mehedi Hasan 1/24 (4 overs)

Rangpur won by 6 wickets
Zohur Ahmed Chowdhury Stadium, Chittagong
Umpires: Masudur Rahman (Ban) and Alex Wharf (Eng)
Player of the match: Farhad Reza (Rangpur Riders)

- Rajshahi Kings won the toss and elected to bat.

30 January 2019
13:30
Scorecard

Chittagong Vikings; 174/5 (20 overs)	v	Dhaka Dynamites; 163/9 (20 overs)
Cameron Delport 71 (57); Andre Russell 3/38 (4 overs)		Shakib Al Hasan 53 (42); Abu Jayed 3/25 (4 overs)

Chittagong won by 11 runs
Zohur Ahmed Chowdhury Stadium, Chittagong
Umpires: Mahfuzur Rahman (Ban) and Shozab Raza (Pak)
Player of the match: Cameron Delport (Chittagong Vikings)

- Chittagong Vikings won the toss and elected to bat.
- Andre Russell (Dhaka Dynamites) took a hat-trick.

30 January 2019
18:30 (D/N)
Scorecard

Sylhet Sixers; 189/5 (20 overs)	v	Rajshahi Kings; 190/5 (18 overs)
Nicholas Pooran 76* (31); Kamrul Islam Rabbi 2/30 (4 overs)		Laurie Evans 76 (36); Sohail Tanvir 2/27 (3 overs)

Rajshahi won by 5 wickets
Zohur Ahmed Chowdhury Stadium, Chittagong
Umpires: Tanvir Ahmed (Ban) and Ranmore Martinesz (SL)
Player of the match: Laurie Evans (Rajshahi kings)

- Sylhet Sixers won the toss and elected to bat.

=== Phase 5 (Dhaka) ===
1 February 2019
14:00 (D/N)
Scorecard

Comilla Victorians; 127 (20 overs)	v	Dhaka Dynamites; 126/9 (20 overs)
Tamim Iqbal 38 (20); Rubel Hossain 4/30 (4 overs)		Kieron Pollard 34 (33); Mohammad Saifuddin 4/22 (4 overs)

Comilla won by 1 run
Sher-e-Bangla National Cricket Stadium, Dhaka
Umpires: Masudur Rahman (Ban) and Alex Wharf (Eng)
Player of the match: Mohammad Saifuddin (Comilla Victorians)

- Dhaka Dynamites won the toss and elected to field.

1 February 2019
19:00 (D/N)
Scorecard

Sylhet Sixers; 165/5 (20 overs)	v	Chittagong Vikings; 136 (18.3 overs)
Andre Fletcher 66 (53); Hardus Viljoen 4/29 (4 overs)		Mushfiqur Rahim 48 (32); Ebadot Hossain 4/17 (4 overs)

Sylhet won by 29 runs
Sher-e-Bangla National Cricket Stadium, Dhaka
Umpires: Shozab Raza (Pak) and Nadir Shah (Ban)
Player of the match: Ebadot Hossain (Sylhet Sixers)

- Chittagong Vikings won the toss and elected to field.

2 February 2019
13:30
Scorecard

Comilla Victorians; 72 (16.3 overs)	v	Rangpur Riders; 76/1 (9.3 overs)
Ziaur Rahman 21 (25); Ravi Bopara 3/7 (3 overs)		Chris Gayle 35* (30); Sanjit Saha 1/32 (3.3 overs)

Rangpur won by 9 wickets
Sher-e-Bangla National Cricket Stadium, Dhaka
Umpires: Mahfuzur Rahman (Ban) and Alex Wharf (Eng)
Player of the match: Ravi Bopara (Rangpur Riders)

- Comilla Victorians won the toss and elected to bat.
- Sanjit Saha (Comilla Victorians) and Minhajul Abedin Afridi (Rangpur Riders) both made their T20 debuts.

2 February 2019
18:30 (D/N)
Scorecard

Khulna Titans; 123/9 (20 overs)	v	Dhaka Dynamites; 124/4 (14.5 overs)
David Wiese 30 (27); Rubel Hossain 2/27 (4 overs)		Upul Tharanga 42 (30); Mahmudullah 2/14 (3 overs)

Dhaka won by 6 wickets
Sher-e-Bangla National Cricket Stadium, Dhaka
Umpires: Ranmore Martinesz (SL) and Nadir Shah (Ban)
Player of the match: Upul Tharanga (Dhaka Dynamites)

- Khulna Titans won the toss and elected to bat.

== Playoffs ==
Semifinals
4 February 2019 — Dhaka
1	Rangpur Riders	165/5 (20 overs)
2	Comilla Victorians	166/2 (18.5 overs)
4 February 2019 — Dhaka
3	Chittagong Vikings	135/8 (20 overs)
4	Dhaka Dynamites	136/4 (16.4 overs)

Preliminary final
6 February 2019 — Dhaka
1	Rangpur Riders	142 (19.4 overs)
4	Dhaka Dynamites	147/5 (16.4 overs)

Final
8 February 2019 — Dhaka
2	Comilla Victorians	199/3 (20 overs)
4	Dhaka Dynamites	182/9 (20 overs)

=== Eliminator ===
4 February 2019
13:30
Scorecard

Chittagong Vikings; 135/8 (20 overs)	v	Dhaka Dynamites; 136/4 (16.4 overs)
Mosaddek Hossain 40 (35); Sunil Narine 4/15 (4 overs)		Upul Tharanga 51 (43); Khaled Ahmed 3/20 (4 overs)

Dhaka won by 6 wickets
Sher-e-Bangla National Cricket Stadium, Dhaka
Umpires: Ranmore Martinesz (SL) and Mahfuzur Rahman (Ban)
Player of the match: Sunil Narine (Dhaka Dynamites)

- Chittagong Vikings won the toss and elected to bat.
- As a result of this match, Dhaka advanced to Qualifier 2 while Chittagong were eliminated.

=== Qualifiers ===
Qualifier 1

4 February 2019
18:30 (D/N)
Scorecard

Rangpur Riders; 165/5 (20 overs)	v	Comilla Victorians; 166/2 (18.5 overs)
Benny Howell 53* (28); Sanjit Saha 1/14 (4 overs)		Evin Lewis 71* (53); Shafiul Islam 1/21 (3 overs)

Comilla won by 8 wickets
Sher-e-Bangla National Cricket Stadium, Dhaka
Umpires: Sharfuddoula (Ban) and Alex Wharf (Eng)
Player of the match: Evin Lewis (Comilla Victorians)

- Rangpur Riders won the toss and elected to bat.
- As a result of this match, Comilla advanced to the Final while Rangpur advanced to Qualifier 2

Qualifier 2

6 February 2019
18:30 (D/N)
Scorecard

Rangpur Riders; 142 (19.4 overs)	v	Dhaka Dynamites; 147/5 (16.4 overs)
Ravi Bopara 49 (43); Rubel Hossain 4/23 (3.4 overs)		Andre Russell 40* (19); Mashrafe Mortaza 2/32 (4 overs)

Dhaka won by 5 wickets
Sher-e-Bangla National Cricket Stadium, Dhaka
Umpires: Masudur Rahman (Ban) and Alex Wharf (Eng)
Player of the match: Rubel Hossain (Dhaka Dynamites)

- Dhaka Dynamites won the toss and elected to field.
- As a result of this match, Dhaka advanced to the Final while Rangpur were eliminated.

=== Final ===
8 February 2019
18:00 (D/N)
Scorecard

Comilla Victorians; 199/3 (20 overs)	v	Dhaka Dynamites; 182/9 (20 overs)
Tamim Iqbal 141* (61); Shakib Al Hasan 1/45 (4 overs)		Rony Talukdar 66 (38); Wahab Riaz 3/28 (4 overs)

Comilla won by 17 runs
Sher-e-Bangla National Cricket Stadium, Dhaka
Umpires: Ranmore Martinesz (SL) and Alex Wharf (Eng)
Player of the match: Tamim Iqbal (Comilla Victorians)

- Dhaka Dynamites won the toss and elected to field.
- Tamim Iqbal (Comilla Victorians) scored his highest individual score in T20 cricket and it was also first time a century was scored by a Bangladeshi batsman in any T20 cricket final.
- Comilla Victorians won their second BPL title.

== Statistics ==
Most runs
Player	Team	Matches	Runs
Rilee Rossouw	Rangpur Riders	14	558
Tamim Iqbal	Comilla Victorians	14	467
Mushfiqur Rahim	Chittagong Vikings	13	426
Nicholas Pooran	Sylhet Sixers	11	379
Laurie Evans	Rajshahi Kings	11	339

- Source: Cricinfo.com

Most wickets
Player	Team	Matches	Wickets
Shakib Al Hasan	Dhaka Dynamites	15	23
Taskin Ahmed	Sylhet Sixers	12	22
Mashrafe Mortaza	Rangpur Riders	14	22
Rubel Hossain	Dhaka Dynamites	15	22
Mohammad Saifuddin	Comilla Victorians	13	20

- Source: Cricinfo.com

Highest team totals
Team	Total	Opponent	Ground	Result
Rangpur Riders	239/4	Chittagong Vikings	Zohur Ahmed Chowdhury Stadium	Won
Comilla Victorians	237/5	Khulna Titans	Zohur Ahmed Chowdhury Stadium	Won
Chittagong Vikings	214/4	Khulna Titans	Sylhet International Cricket Stadium	Won

- Source: Cricinfo.com

== See also ==
- Chittagong Vikings in 2019
- Comilla Victorians in 2019
- Dhaka Dynamites in 2019
