= 2012 Asia Cup final =

2012 Asia Cup Final
- Event: 2012 Asia Cup
Pakistan	Bangladesh
(Pakistan)	(Bangladesh)
236/9	234/8
50 overs	50 overs
- Pakistan won by 2 runs
- Date: 22 March 2012
- Venue: Sher-e-Bangla National Stadium, Dhaka
- Player of the match: Shahid Afridi (Pak)
- Umpires: Steve Davis (Aus) and Ian Gould (Eng)
- Attendance: 25000+

The 2012 Asia Cup Final was the final of the 2012 Asia Cup, a One day International cricket tournament, and was played between Pakistan and Bangladesh on 22 March 2012 in Dhaka. Pakistan stunned Bangladesh in the last ball thriller to achieve their second Asia Cup title after 2000.

== Background ==
The 2012 Asia Cup started on 11 March 2012 and was hosted by Bangladesh. All matches were played at Sher-e-Bangla National Cricket Stadium. Four full member national teams played each other in Round-robin format. Pakistan reached the final by defeating Bangladesh and Sri Lanka while Bangladesh reached the final defeating India and Sri Lanka.

== Road to Final ==
Pakistan			Bangladesh
Opponent	Result	Matches	Opponent	Result
Bangladesh	Won	Match 1	Pakistan	Lost
Sri Lanka	Won	Match 2	India	Won
India	Lost	Match 3	Sri Lanka	Won
Super Four Table

Pos	Team	Pld	W	L	T	NR	BP	Pts	HTH	NRR	For	Against
1	Pakistan	3	2	1	0	0	1	9	–	0.4439	780 (139.5)	759 (147.5)
2	Bangladesh	3	2	1	0	0	0	8	1	0.0223	746 (136.3)	762 (140)
3	India	3	2	1	0	0	0	8	0	0.3774	923 (147.5)	876 (149.2)
4	Sri Lanka	3	0	3	0	0	0	0	–	-0.8869	653 (140)	705 (127)

== Match officials and result ==
- On-field umpires: Steve Davis (Aus) and Ian Gould (Eng)
- Third umpire: Sundaram Ravi (Ind)
- Reserve umpire: Masudur Rahman (Ban)
- Match referee: David Boon (Aus)
- Toss: Bangladesh won the toss and elected to field.

== Scorecard ==
=== 1st innings ===
Pakistan batting
Player	Status	Runs	Balls	4s	6s	Strike rate
Mohammad Hafeez	c Nazmul b Razzak	40	87	4	0	45.97
Nasir Jamshed	c Mahmudullah b Mortaza	9	8	2	0	112.50
Younis Khan	lbw b Nazmul	1	5	0	0	20.00
Misbah-ul-Haq	run out (Nasir Hossain)	13	23	1	0	56.52
Umar Akmal	c ( Rahim b Mahmudullah	30	45	0	1	66.66
Hammad Azam	c & b Shakib	30	37	3	1	81.08
Shahid Afridi	c Nasir b Shakib	32	22	4	1	145.45
Sarfaraz Ahmed	not out	46	52	4	0	88.46
Umar Gul	c Shakib b Mortaza	4	6	0	0	66.66
Saeed Ajmal	b Razzak	4	7	0	0	57.14
Aizaz Cheema	not out	9	11	1	0	81.81
Total	50 overs	236	300	19	3	4.72(run rate)

Fall of wickets: 1/16 (Jamshed, 4.2 overs), 2/19 (Younis, 5.2 overs), 3/55 (Mishbah, 15.2 overs), 4/70 (Hafeez, 21.2 overs), 5/129 (Azam, 33.3 overs), 6/133 (Umar, 34.5 overs), 7/178 (Afridi, 41.3 overs), 8/199 (Gul, 44.3 overs), 9/206 (Ajmal 45.6 overs)

Bangladesh bowling
Bowler	Overs	Maidens	Runs	Wickets	Econ	Wides	NBs
Mashrafe Mortaza	10	0	48	2	4.80	0	{{{no-balls}}}
Nazmul Hossain	8	1	36	1	4.50	{{{wides}}}	{{{no-balls}}}
Abdur Razzak	10	3	26	2	2.60	{{{wides}}}	{{{no-balls}}}
Shahadat Hossain	9	0	63	0	7.00	{{{wides}}}	{{{no-balls}}}
Shakib Al Hasan	10	1	39	2	3.90	{{{wides}}}	{{{no-balls}}}
Mahmudullah	3	0	14	1	4.66	{{{wides}}}	{{{no-balls}}}

=== 2nd innings ===
Bangladesh batting
Player	Status	Runs	Balls	4s	6s	Strike rate
Tamim Iqbal	c Younis b Gul	60	68	8	0	88.23
Nazimuddin	c Younis b Afridi	16	52	3	0	30.76
Jahurul Islam	c Younis b Ajmal	0	5	0	0	0.00
Nasir Hossain	c Misbah b Gul	28	63	1	0	44.44
Shakib Al Hasan	b Aizaz	68	72	7	1	94.44
Mushfiqur Rahim	c Jamshed b Aizaz	10	8	1	0	125.00
Mahmudullah	not out	17	16	1	0	106.25
Mashrafe Mortaza	c Jamshed b Ajmal	18	9	2	0	200.00
Abdur Razzak	b Aizaz	6	8	0	0	75.00
Shahadat Hossain	not out	0	1	0	0	0.00
Nazmul Hossain	Did not bat					
Total	50 overs	234	300	20	1	4.68 (Run Rate)

Fall of wickets: 1/68 (Nazimuddin, 16.4 overs), 2/68 (Jahurul, 17.5 overs), 3/81 (Tamim, 23.1 overs), 4/170 (Nasir, 42.3 overs), 5/179 (Shakib, 43.4 overs), 6/190 (Rahim, 45.1 overs), 7/218 (Mortaza, 47.4 overs), 8/233 (Razzak, 49.5)

Pakistan bowling
Bowler	Overs	Maidens	Runs	Wickets	Econ	Wides	NBs
Mohammad Hafeez	10	0	30	0	3.00	{{{wides}}}	{{{no-balls}}}
Umar Gul	10	2	65	2	6.50	{{{wides}}}	{{{no-balls}}}
Saeed Ajmal	10	2	40	2	4.00	{{{wides}}}	{{{no-balls}}}
Shahid Afridi	10	1	28	1	2.80	{{{wides}}}	{{{no-balls}}}
Aizaz Cheema	7	0	46	3	6.57	{{{wides}}}	{{{no-balls}}}
Hammad Azam	3	0	20	0	6.66	{{{wides}}}	{{{no-balls}}}
