= Lasith Malinga =

Sri Lankan bowler (born 1983)

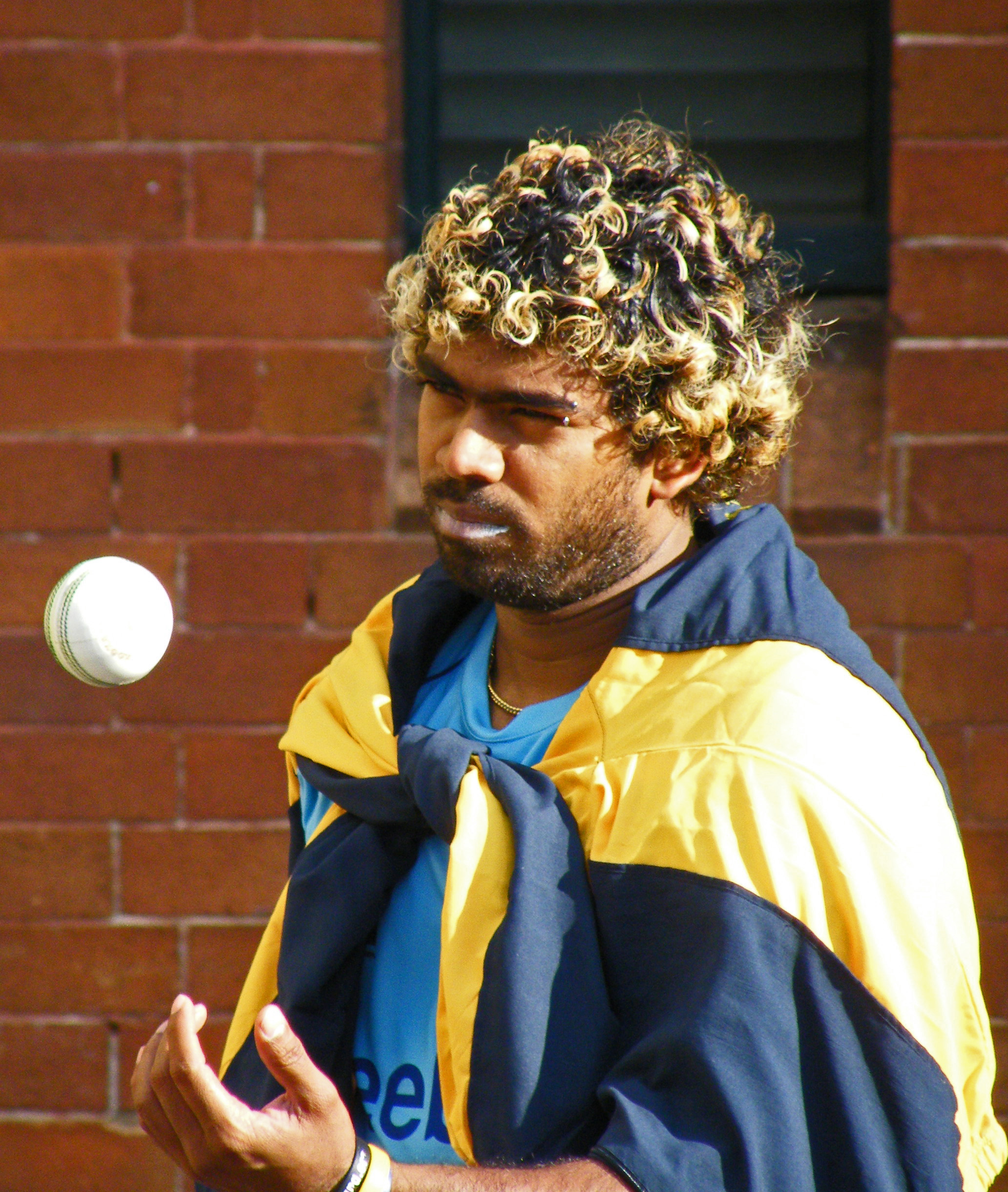
- Malinga at the Sydney Cricket Ground in October 2010

Personal information
- Full name: Separamadu Lasith Malinga
- Born: 28 August 1983 (age 43); Galle, Sri Lanka
- Height: 5 ft 7 in (170 cm)
- Batting: Right-handed
- Bowling: Right-arm fast
- Role: Bowler

International information
- National side: Sri Lanka (2004–2020)
- Test debut (cap 99): 1 July 2004 v Australia
- Last Test: 3 August 2010 v India
- ODI debut (cap 123): 17 July 2004 v UAE
- Last ODI: 26 July 2019 v Bangladesh
- ODI shirt no.: 99
- T20I debut (cap 8): 15 June 2006 v England
- Last T20I: 6 March 2020 v West Indies
- T20I shirt no.: 99

Domestic team information
- Years: Team
- 2001–2004: Galle
- 2004–2021: Nondescripts
- 2007: Kent
- 2008–2017; 2019–2020: Mumbai Indians
- 2010–2011: Basnahira
- 2012: Ruhuna Royals
- 2012–2014: Melbourne Stars
- 2013: Dhaka Gladiators
- 2013: Guyana Amazon Warriors
- 2014: Southern Express
- 2017: Rangpur Riders
- 2019: Khulna Titans

Career statistics
Competition	Test	ODI	T20I	FC
Matches	30	226	84	84
Runs scored	275	567	136	585
Batting average	11.45	6.83	3.47	9.75
100s/50s	0/1	0/1	0/0	0/1
Top score	64	56	27	64
Balls bowled	5,209	10,936	1,781	11,927
Wickets	101	338	107	257
Bowling average	33.15	28.87	20.36	30.28
5 wickets in innings	3	8	2	7
10 wickets in match	0	0	0	0
Best bowling	5/50	6/38	5/6	6/17
Catches/stumpings	7/–	31/–	20/–	24/–
Medal record
Men's Cricket
Representing Sri Lanka
ICC Cricket World Cup
Runner-up	2007 West Indies
Runner-up	2011 India–Bangladesh–Sri Lanka
ICC T20 World Cup
Winner	2014 Bangladesh
Runner-up	2009 England
Runner-up	2012 Sri Lanka
ACC Asia Cup
Winner	2014 Bangladesh
Runner-up	2010 Sri Lanka
- Source: ESPNcricinfo, 6 March 2020

Separamadu Lasith Malinga (Sinhala: සෙපරමාදු ලසිත් මාලිංග; Tamil: லசித் மாலிங்க; born 28 August 1983) is a Sri Lankan former cricketer who is widely regarded as one of the greatest limited overs bowlers of all time. Playing as a right-arm fast bowler, Malinga was commonly used as a specialist death bowler, and captained the Sri Lanka national cricket team to the 2014 T20 World Cup title. He was nicknamed "Slinga Malinga" due to his distinctive round-arm action, sometimes referred to as a sling action. He announced his retirement from all forms of cricket on 14 September 2021.

Malinga's unorthodox action and dipping slower ball yorkers are credited with much of his success. He changed the dynamics and landscape of death bowling in limited overs cricket through his technique and approach. Malinga is known for his ability to take wickets on consecutive balls, often through bowling in-swinging yorkers: he is the only bowler in the world to have two World Cup hat-tricks, the first bowler to take a double hat-trick, the only bowler to take 4 wickets in 4 balls twice in international cricket, the only bowler to have taken three hat-tricks in ODIs and only bowler to have two double hat-tricks. He is also the first bowler to take five hat-tricks across all formats of international cricket, and holds the record for most hat-tricks in international cricket.

On 22 April 2011, he announced his retirement from Test cricket. He was named as the official event ambassador for the 2012 World Twenty20 World Cup in Sri Lanka by ICC. On 26 July 2019, he retired from One Day International cricket after the first ODI against Bangladesh.

In September 2019, during the series against New Zealand, Malinga became the first bowler to take 100 wickets in Twenty20 International cricket. He achieved a hat-trick, becoming the first bowler to claim two T20I hat-tricks, and took four wickets in four consecutive balls in the third over of his spell. This feat made him the second bowler to accomplish this in T20I history, following Rashid Khan.

In January 2021, he retired from T20 franchise cricket. In September 2021, Malinga announced his retirement from all forms of cricket.

== Early years ==
Malinga grew up in modest circumstances in Rathgama, a coastal village situated 12 km (7.5 mi) northwest of Galle. He often played cricket with friends on the sand banks and coconut groves by a river in his cricket-obsessed village. His father Separamadu Milton, is a retired bus mechanic who worked out of the Galle depot.

He had his education at three schools, namely: Mahinda College, at Galle; Vidyaloka College, at Galle too; and Maha Vidyalaya at Thiranagama, situated nearby his village.

After passing the grade 5 Scholarship Examination in 1993, he entered Vidyaloka College, Galle for his secondary education, where he started his cricket career. Here Malinga was discovered by former Sri Lankan paceman Champaka Ramanayake. Champaka, so impressed by Malinga's raw ability, invited him to join the Galle Cricket Club. Champaka also helped him to join the first XI cricket team of Mahinda College, Galle. Joining Mahinda College was the turning point of his cricket career and he was helped by some of its distinguished Old boys. A short-lived attempt to make Malinga's action more upright led to much reduced pace and failing accuracy. Malinga promptly returned to his natural action with success, and with great encouragement from Ramanayake.

He didn't pick up hard-ball cricket until relatively in his teenage years but his talent was discovered by fast bowling coaches Champaka Ramanayake and Anusha Samaranayake. Both of them brought him to the domestic system and nurtured him during his early years.

On his first hard-ball game, in inter-village match at the local ground of Rathgama, he dismissed Kumaraiya, flying the off stump, making it his first leather-ball wicket. During club cricket, he got nicknamed daakaththa (the sickle) by his teammates.

He practices Buddhism and he married Tanya Perera in 2010.

== International career ==
=== Debut years ===
A graph showing Malinga's Test career bowling statistics and how they have varied over time

Malinga made his Test debut on 1 July 2004 against Australia at Marrara Oval In Darwin. He was immediately successful, taking six wickets in the match (Darren Lehmann twice, Adam Gilchrist, Damien Martyn, Shane Warne and Michael Kasprowicz) He was impressed by the friendliness of the Australian team in general, and in particular Adam Gilchrist who sought him out after the game to present him with one of the match stumps in the Sri Lankan dressing room.

Malinga made his ODI debut in Sri Lanka's opening match of the 2004 Asia Cup against the United Arab Emirates, becoming the 123rd player to do so. Easily winning the match by 116 runs, Malinga took the wicket of the Emirati captain, Khurram Khan to finish the match with figures of 1/39. Since then he has become a regular member on the ODI squad.

=== Test retirement ===
He developed into Sri Lanka's fastest Test bowler and a regular member of both their Test and One Day International teams. He has earned a reputation for troubling batsmen with his lively pace and well-directed bouncer. He regularly bowls at speeds between 140 and 150 km/h (87 and 93 mph) and sometimes slightly faster. As time went by he started to lose pace, clocking around 130 and 140 km/h (81 and 87 mph). His slower off cutter was also menacing. He burst onto the test scene after ripping through the New Zealand top order, helping Sri Lanka draw the test series on their 2006/07 tour of New Zealand. He announced his retirement from Test cricket on 22 April 2011 in order to prolong his career in ODI and T20 cricket.

=== Golden World Cups ===
During the 2007 Cricket World Cup Super 8 match on 28 March between Sri Lanka and South Africa, Malinga became the first player to take four wickets in four consecutive balls in One Day International cricket. Needing five runs for victory and with five wickets in hand, Malinga was handed the ball in the 45th over of the South African's innings. In the final two balls of the over he cleaned bowled Shaun Pollock and had Andrew Hall caught at cover. In his next over, he removed Jacques Kallis caught behind then bowled Makhaya Ntini. This was only the fifth hat-trick in World Cup history, the third ODI hat-trick for Sri Lanka and the 24th overall in ODIs. He nearly took the final wicket as a ball shaved the stumps. Despite Malinga's lethal spell, however, South Africa proceeded to win the match by 1 wicket with 10 balls still left. He was named in the 'Team of the Tournament' by ESPNcricinfo for the 2007 World Cup.

During the 2011 Cricket World Cup, Malinga took his second career hat-trick in Sri Lanka's group stage match against Kenya. This made him the first bowler to take two World Cup hat-tricks, and the fourth to take two hat-tricks in all One Day International cricket (alongside Wasim Akram, Saqlain Mushtaq and Chaminda Vaas). He was named as part of the 'Team of the Tournament' by ESPNcricinfo. In August 2011, he managed yet another hat-trick, against Australia, to become the first man to take three hat-tricks in ODI cricket.

For his performances in 2011, he was named as 12th man in the World ODI XI by the ICC. He was also named in the World ODI XI by the ICC for 2012 and 2013. He was also named in the World ODI XI by the ESPNcricinfo.

He was named in the 'Team of the Tournament' by ESPNcricinfo for the 2009 T20I World Cup. His spell of 5 for 28 against Australia was voted to be the second-best ODI bowling performance of the year 2011 by ESPNcricinfo voters. His spell of 5 for 31 at Pallekele against England was voted as the best T20I bowling performance of the year 2012 by ESPNcricinfo.

=== Injury ===
After West Indies tour, Malinga suffered a back injury and a knee injury. Because of this, he did not participate in both the New Zealand tour and the Indian tour, hoping that he would recover for the beginning of the 2016 ICC World Twenty20. Malinga was appointed as the captain for the 2016 Asia Cup, where he was only able to play against UAE, with a match-winning bowling performance. The knee injury caused him to skip the remaining matches and Sri Lanka lost them all. Sri Lanka announced their World T20 team with Malinga as the captain, but continuous injuries resulted in Malinga stepping down from the captaincy and Angelo Mathews was named the captain in all formats. Even though Sri Lanka felt that Malinga would recover for the World cup matches, his injuries ruled him out of the Twenty20 squad. He returned home due to a prevailing bone bruise on his left knee.

=== Captaincy ===
Malinga was named as the vice-captain of the Sri Lankan Twenty20 International team in October 2012. He became captain of Sri Lankan Cricket Team in 2014 ICC World Twenty20 after Dinesh Chandimal received a ban. He successfully led the team to win the world cup. Due to continuous injuries, he stepped down from the captaincy in 2015.

His spell of 5 for 56 against Pakistan at Mirpur in 2014 was named as the best ODI Bowling Performance of the year by ESPNcricinfo. He was also nominated for his spell of 5 for 52 against the same opponents in the group stage game.

However, in 2017 against India, he was appointed as the ODI captain due to a back injury to the captain Chamara Kapugedera. Sri Lanka lost the match in that game.

On 14 December 2018, Malinga was appointed as the limited over captain for New Zealand tour.

=== International comeback ===
Malinga quit from all domestic and international cricket for a one-year after his T20I match against UAE in March 2016. Due to these injuries, Malinga lost matches against England, Australia, and Zimbabwe Tri-series, where Sri Lanka involved heavy defeats in limited over cricket and went down in international rankings. Though he recovered from injuries in late December, Malinga was unavailable to South Africa series after a bout of dengue. Malinga was picked up to the Australian tour and played in the match against Prime Minister's XI. His comeback match came against Australia on 17 February 2017, where he took two wickets and two catches. Sri Lanka won the match by 5 wickets at the end.

On 6 April 2017, during the second T20I against Bangladesh, Malinga took a hat-trick, becoming the second Sri Lankan and fifth overall to take a T20I hat-trick. With that, Malinga has taken 4 international hat-tricks, which is most by a Sri Lankan player and joint highest with Pakistani Wasim Akram.

Malinga was included to the ODI squad for 2017 ICC Champions Trophy in June 2017. He played his comeback match against South Africa on 3 June 2017 at the pool match of Champions Trophy. However, his comeback was not good at all, where he finished the spell wicket less by giving 57 runs and put down a catch and was sloppy in the fielding as well. Sri Lanka suffered a heavy loss in the match by 96 runs finally.

During the Indian ODI series, captain Upul Tharanga was suspended two ODIs due to slow over rate. Therefore, Chamara Kapugedera was appointed as the stand-in captain of those two ODIs. However, he aggravated a back injury during the third ODI and ruled out of the series. For the fourth ODI, Malinga was appointed stand-in captain. In the match, Malinga took his 300th ODI wicket by dismissing Virat Kohli. Despite his milestone, India scored 375 runs and Sri Lanka only managed to score 207 runs and lost the series 4–0. India won the fifth match of the series and whitewash Sri Lanka for the second consecutive time in a 5-match series.

Since his comeback, Malinga was not fully effective with the ball and also with the fielding. However, he did not announce an immediate retirement and said he wanted to play international cricket for Sri Lanka until 2019 Cricket World Cup. Since his return, Malinga averaging 62.30 for each of his 10 wickets, and going at six an over, Due to his ineffective bowling, Malinga was omitted from the ODI squad for 2017–18 Pakistan series in the UAE.

Due to his continuous injuries, he was not considered for the selection by the Sri Lankan cricket team in 2018 Nidahas Trophy. In the series, Sri Lanka suffered heavy losses against Bangladesh and omitted from the final as well. He was left out from team selection process in late 2017 when the sports ministry directly intervened into Sri Lanka cricket by introducing the minimum fitness standards. Malinga challenged the then sports minister Dayasiri Jayasekara regarding his exclusion from the team for lack of fitness levels and in retaliation Dayasiri used his authoritarian powers to sack Malinga from being selected to the national team for over a year.

Sri Lanka Cricket informed Malinga to play in the domestic competition and then he will selected for the upcoming international tours. But, due to coaching responsibilities in Mumbai Indians, Malinga also missed 2018 Super Provincial One Day Tournament. However, Malinga announced that he hope to join international squad for the South African limited over tour in Sri Lanka 2018. But he was not picked for both ODIs and T20Is.

He however continued to work on his fitness and bowling with his mentor Anusha Ramanayake and following an impressive domestic season he was subsequently recalled to the national team for the 2018 Asia Cup. Malinga was included in the squad for 2018 Asia Cup as the premium fast bowler with Suranga Lakmal. He played the opening game of the series with Bangladesh and took two wickets in the first over of the match. He finished the spell with 4 wickets for just 23 runs.

On 13 October 2018 against England in the second ODI of the series, Malinga took his 8th five-wicket haul. Four wickets of them were slow dipping yorkers, which credited as his best strength in the career. He finished five wickets for 44 runs, despite Sri Lanka lost the match by 31 runs in D/L method. During the match, he also completed 500 international wickets.

=== Late ODI career ===
During South African series in early 2019, under the captaincy of Malinga, Sri Lanka suffered another big loss. They lost the ODI series 5–0, which was the second time they lost 5–0 to South Africa away. In the T20I series, Sri Lanka suffered a 3–0 loss.

"As a 18 years old net bowler who I faced in Galle 2002 to the champion who's going to work out today for your last ODI game u have been true to your self. Champion a team mate and above all a good friend you have done Sri Lanka proud. Enjoy every moment MALI!!!"

— Mahela Jayawardene.

During South African series, Malinga said that the 2019 ICC Cricket World Cup would feature his final ODI appearance and 2020 ICC T20 World Cup would be his last international appearance for Sri Lanka. In April 2019, he was named in Sri Lanka's squad for the 2019 Cricket World Cup. On 21 June 2019, in the match against England, Malinga took his 50th wicket in a World Cup match. He became the quickest to achieve the milestone with 26 innings in World Cups. Sri Lanka won their fourth consecutive World Cup match against England, and Malinga won the man of the match award for his match winning bowling spells. He finished the tournament as the leading wicket taker for Sri Lanka, with thirteen dismissals in seven matches as the third-highest wicket taker of all time in World Cups.

=== ODI retirement ===
On 26 July 2019, he played his final ODI at R Premadasa Stadium in first ODI against Bangladesh inside a packed house with banners citing ThankYou Mali, Our Slinga Our Pride. In the match he scored 6 runs unbeaten. With the ball, he delivered a yorker spell to dismiss Tamim Iqbal and Soumya Sarkar. In the end, in his final over in ODIs, he took the wicket of Mustafizur Rahman to surpass Anil Kumble to become the ninth-highest wicket taker in ODIs finishing with 338 dismissals.

=== Post ODI retirement ===
Malinga was named as the captain for T20I series against New Zealand, which composed of many young cricketers. During the first T20I, he surpassed Shahid Afridi's wicket tally of 98 to become the highest wicket taker in Twenty20 Internationals. He took two wickets in the match, though Sri Lanka lost the match. In the second T20I, he went to wicket less 39 runs and New Zealand won the match and sealed the series. In the third T20I, Sri Lanka scored a modest score of 125 runs. In the match, Malinga delivered a match winning bowling spell. With the wicket of Colin Munro, Malinga became the first cricketer to take 100 wickets in Twenty20 Internationals, as well as the first ever cricketer to take 100 wickets in all three formats of the game. In the course with wickets of Hamish Rutherford and Colin de Grandhomme, he completed his fifth hat-trick, second in T20Is as well. He is the only cricketer to have two take T20I hat-tricks and five international hat-tricks (three in ODIs and 2 in T20Is). He then took the wicket of Ross Taylor to become the world's only bowler to take two four-in-four, where his first four-in-four came in 2007 World Cup against South Africa. Malinga finished his spell with 5 for 6 runs, and Sri Lanka won the match by 37 runs. He won the man of the match award for impressive bowling performance.

He created a YouTube account titled ‘’Master The Game’’ in 2020 and he uploaded videos related to cricket match analysis in Sinhala language with Hindi and English languages.

In November 2020, Malinga was nominated for the ICC Men's ODI and T20I Cricketer of the Decade awards. Malinga retired from all forms of cricket on 14 September 2021, ending his career as the leading wicket taker in T20Is with 107 wickets. He announced his retirement through his official YouTube channel.

== T20 franchise career ==
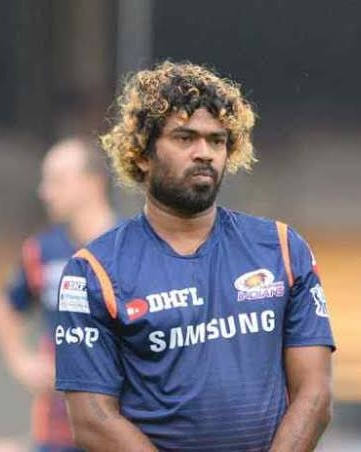
Malinga in practice for the Mumbai Indians.

On 20 January 2021, Lasith Malinga retired from T20 franchise cricket.

=== Indian Premier League ===
Malinga has played for Indian Premier League (IPL) team Mumbai Indians since 2008. He became their leading bowler in this format and leading bowler in the competition in terms of wickets taken. Sachin Tendulkar, the ex-Mumbai Indians captain, described Malinga as an important cog in the Indians' game plan after the retirement of captain Shaun Pollock, who represented the team in the first season. In the first match for the Mumbai Indians in the fourth season, he got 5 wickets against Delhi Daredevils, restricting them to a mere 95. His best bowling figures ever is 6/7 for Melbourne Stars against Perth Scorchers in December 2012, the only six-wicket haul taken the Australian Big Bash League. Malinga was also one of the overseas players to represent Kent Spitfires in the English T20 competition in 2007. Kent went on to win the tournament beating Gloucestershire with Malinga playing a key part throughout the tournament. For his performances in 2010, 2011 and 2014, he was named in the ESPNcricinfo IPL XI. He won the Purple Cap award (most wickets) in the fourth season of Indian Premier League with 28 scalps in 16 matches. Throughout the tournament, he led the Mumbai Indians attack from the front and was instrumental in many victories.

Lasith Malinga chose Mumbai Indians over Southern Express in the CLT20 cricket tournament.

In the 2011 Champions League Twenty20, he was the highest wicket taker in the tournament and won the golden wicket for this performance and won the award for the player of the tournament. Malinga also hit a lot of runs. For his performances in 2011, he was named in the ESPNcricinfo CLT20 XI. He picked up his 100th IPL wicket of his career during the 2013 Indian Premier League in a league stage match against Kings XI Punjab and became the first ever bowler to reach the milestone of 100 wickets in IPL history.

On the occasion of the 10-year anniversary of IPL, he was also named in the all-time ESPNcricinfo IPL XI.

In 2018 IPL Auctions, Malinga was not bought by Mumbai Indians due to his ineffective bowling in the recent past. However, on 7 February 2018, Malinga was named bowling mentor of Mumbai Indians ahead of IPL 2018. He has played 127 games for Mumbai Indians in the IPL and Champions League T20 and is the highest-wicket taker for the franchise with 179 scalps at an economy rate of 6.88. In 2019 he was again bought by the Mumbai Indians.

In December 2018, he was re-bought by the Mumbai Indians in the player auction for the 2019 Indian Premier League.

On 22 March 2019, he ruled himself out of at least the first six IPL matches for Mumbai Indians in 2019. This was due to the fact that in order to qualify for the Sri Lanka World Cup squad, Sri Lanka's selectors told him that he must play in the forthcoming Super Provincial One Day domestic tournament to get qualify for the World Cup. However, on 25 March 2019, SLC soften the decision and make him available for the IPL 2019. The decision was taken after BCCI asked Sri Lanka Cricket to make Malinga available for as much of the tournament as possible. He returned to Sri Lanka to feature in the Super Provincial One-Day Tournament before rejoining Mumbai after 10 April. Malinga was available for Mumbai Indians through the entirety of April. He contributed to the fourth title win for Mumbai Indians with a wicket on the last ball in the final where 2 runs where required thus giving Mumbai a win by 1 run.

He also holds a unique distinction of picking up 10 wickets in two different formats across 2 nations within a space of 24 hours which he achieved it in 2019. On 3 April 2019, he featured in an IPL match as part of the 2019 Indian Premier League playing for Mumbai Indians against Chennai Super Kings and picked up 3/34 in the match which progressed up until midnight Indian time. The very next day, he took a flight early morning to reach Kandy in order to play in a domestic List A match as part of the Sri Lanka Super Four Provincial Limited Over Tournament representing Galle for which he was named as the captain. He subsequently went onto record his career best bowling figures in List A cricket by capturing 7/49 for Galle in that match and recorded 10/83 within a single day in two different matches in two separate nations.

He pulled out from participating in the 2020 Indian Premier League for personal reasons and James Pattinson was named as his replacement for the season.

=== Global T20 Canada ===
In May 2018, he was named as one of the ten marquee players for the first edition of the Global T20 Canada cricket tournament. On 3 June 2018, he was selected to play for the Montreal Tigers in the players' draft for the inaugural edition of the tournament. He was the leading wicket-taker in the tournament for the Montreal Tigers, with thirteen dismissals in six matches.

=== Lanka Premier League ===
In October 2020, he was drafted by the Galle Gladiators for the inaugural edition of the Lanka Premier League. However, he pulled out from the 2020 Lanka Premier League citing lack of match practice. However, he received criticism from fans for not featuring in LPL and accused him of lack of patriotism.

== Style ==
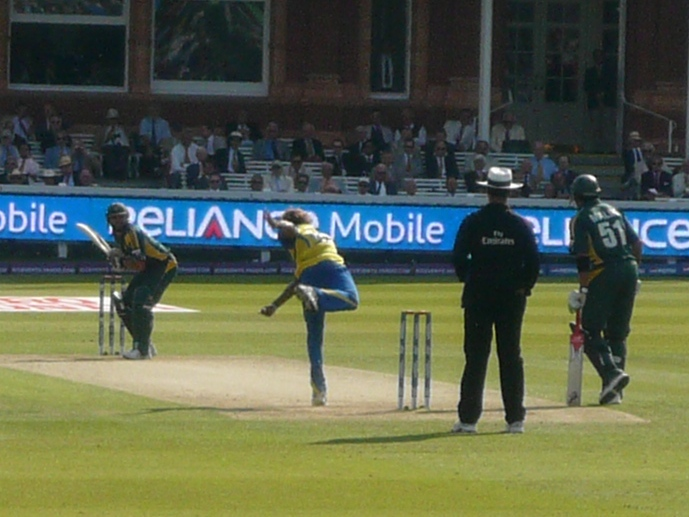
Malinga bowling against Pakistan in the final of the 2009 ICC World Twenty20 at Lord's

Malinga's action has attracted great comment. The cricket reference text Wisden has noted that Malinga's delivery action is similar to "slinging", resulting to his nickname "Slinga Malinga". Malinga has said that his unique round-arm bowling action was a result of learning to play cricket exclusively with a tennis ball. Typically, younger bowlers are encouraged to deliver the ball with their arm near vertical to remove or reduce direction variables.

Sir Viv Richards admired Lasith Malinga's impressive bowling during the 2007 Cricket World Cup which was held in the Caribbean, saying that Lasith Malinga is the best thing that happened to Sri Lankan cricket after Aravinda de Silva.

== Records ==
- First bowler to take 100 T20I wickets.
- First bowler to take 100 wickets across all three formats of international cricket (Tests, ODIs and T20Is).
- The first and, to date, only bowler to take three hat-tricks in One-Day International cricket.
- Best bowling figures by any bowler in the men's Big Bash T20 league - 6/7 for Melbourne Stars against Perth Scorchers.

== Coaching career ==
In February 2018, he was appointed as the bowling mentor for the Mumbai Indians team though Shane Bond served as the bowling coach for the team in 2018 IPL season. Mumbai Indians franchise revealed that Malinga would provide supportive role as a mentor and would be part of the coaching staff ahead of the 2018 IPL season. Prior to the decision made by the Mumbai Indians, Malinga was released from the Mumbai Indians team for the 2018 IPL auction due to his poor bowling performances at the 2017 IPL season.

In 2022, he took on the role of fast bowling coach for the Rajasthan Royals. He also maintained a coaching role for the MI Cape Town and MI New York franchise through the SA20 and ILT20 seasons in 2022.

Subsequently, he was appointed as the bowling coach for Mumbai Indians in 2023 for the 2024 IPL season.

== Further interests ==
After retiring as a professional cricketer, Malinga announced that his "newest passion" was songwriting, releasing his debut album 'Life' in 2023, and subsequently releasing numerous EPs and collaborations, in both Sinhalese and Hindi.

The single 'Mama Pathuwe', from his 2025 album Seda Salu, has over one million listens on Spotify.

Besides music, he is also a collector and breeder of koi carp, describing fish keeping as 'my biggest hobby', and posting regular updates on his YouTube channel about the health and wellbeing of his many pet fish.
