= Shafiul Islam =

Bangladeshi cricketer (born 1989)

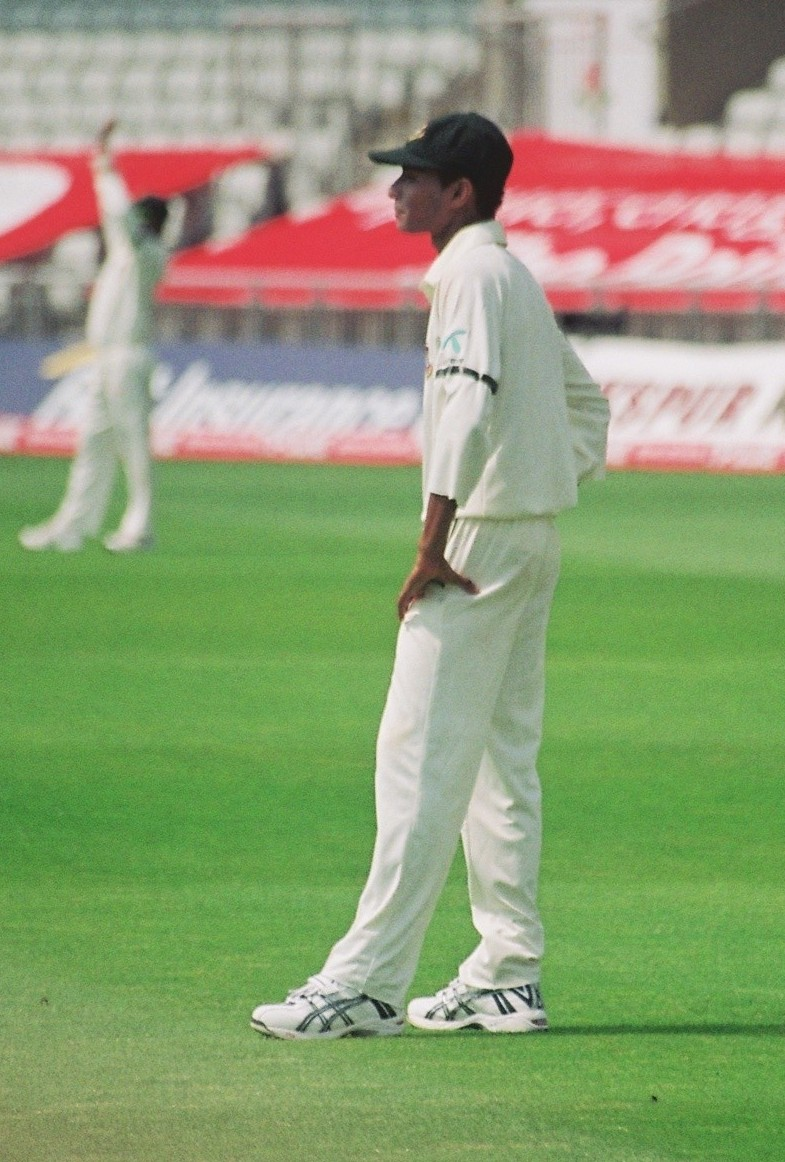
- Shafiul Islam in 2010

Personal information
- Full name: Shafiul Islam Suhas
- Born: 6 October 1989 (age 37); Bogura, Bangladesh
- Height: 1.84 m (6 ft 0 in)
- Batting: Right-handed
- Bowling: Right-arm fast-medium
- Role: Bowler

International information
- National side: Bangladesh (2010–2020)
- Test debut (cap 57): 17 January 2010 v India
- Last Test: 28 September 2017 v South Africa
- ODI debut (cap 96): 4 January 2010 v Sri Lanka
- Last ODI: 3 March 2020 v Zimbabwe
- ODI shirt no.: 13
- T20I debut (cap 25): 3 February 2010 v New Zealand
- Last T20I: 9 March 2020 v Zimbabwe
- T20I shirt no.: 13

Domestic team information
- Years: Team
- 2006/07–present: Rajshahi Division
- 2012: Khulna Royal Bengal
- 2013: Barisal Burners
- 2016–present: Khulna Titans

Career statistics
Competition	Test	ODI	T20I	FC
Matches	11	60	20	62
Runs scored	211	134	23	639
Batting average	10.55	6.09	4.60	12.91
100s/50s	0/1	0/0	0/0	0/2
Top score	53	24*	16	53
Balls bowled	1,734	2,540	400	9,254
Wickets	17	70	20	164
Bowling average	55.41	36.12	26.60	29.51
5 wickets in innings	0	0	0	4
10 wickets in match	0	0	0	0
Best bowling	4/67	4/21	3/36	6/39
Catches/stumpings	2/–	8/–	1/–	17/–
Medal record
Men's Cricket
Representing Bangladesh
ACC Asia Cup
Runner-up	2012 Bangladesh
- Source: ESPNCricinfo, 17 April 2025

Shafiul Islam Suhas (Bengali: শফিউল ইসলাম সুহাস; born: 6 October 1989) is a Bangladeshi cricketer. A right-arm fast-medium bowler, Shafiul has played for Rajshahi Division since 2006.

== Domestic career ==
The Bangladesh Cricket Board founded the six-team Bangladesh Premier League in 2012, a twenty20 tournament to be held in February 2011. An auction was held for teams to buy players, and Shafiul was bought by the Khulna Royal Bengal for $65,000. He was the team's fourth-highest wicket-taker with five wickets from seven matches. In April the BCB upgraded Shafiul's central contract from grade C to grade B.

He was the leading wicket-taker for Agrani Bank Cricket Club in the 2017–18 Dhaka Premier Division Cricket League, with 24 dismissals in 13 matches.

In October 2018, he was named in the squad for the Rangpur Riders team, following the draft for the 2018–19 Bangladesh Premier League.

In March 2019, bowling for Mohammedan Sporting Club against Gazi Group Cricketers in the opening round of the 2018–19 Dhaka Premier Division Cricket League, Shafiul took his first five-wicket haul in List A cricket. In November 2019, he was selected to play for the Khulna Tigers in the 2019–20 Bangladesh Premier League.

== International career ==
Shafiul received his first international call-up when he selected for Bangladesh's squad for a tri-series with India and Sri Lanka in January 2010. He was the only player in Bangladesh's squad with no prior international experience, but his selection was based on his performance in Bangladesh's domestic league.

He made his One Day International debut on 4 January 2010 against Sri Lanka. He opened the bowling with Rubel Hossain and conceded 39 runs from 5 over. He managed to take one wicket, that of Kumar Sangakkara who was caught behind for 74. After taking a wicket in each of his first two ODI matches against, he was named in a 14-man Test squad to play India later that month. He made his Test debut on 17 January and opened the bowling with Shahadat Hossain; India won by 113 runs and Shafiul's maiden wicket was that of Gautam Gambhir.

In the space of a month, Shafiul twice conceded more than 90 runs in an ODI, first against Pakistan in June 2010 and then against England in July. Consequently, he holds the record for most and second-most expensive bowling figures by a Bangladesh player in ODIs.

Bangladesh hosted the 2011 World Cup in February, March, and April along with India and Sri Lanka. Shafiul was selected in Bangladesh's 15-man squad. On 11 March, Shafiul shared in a 58-run partnership for the ninth wicket to help Bangladesh to victory over England by two wickets. After the match, Bangladesh fans chanted "Bangladesh, Bangladesh Shafiul is the real hero". After the match, Shafiul and Mahmudullah were given 1 million taka for their match-winning partnership. Imrul Kayes was named man of the match, although he opined that "The last match Man-of-the-Match award was given to me but I did not deserve it. It was Shafiul who should have got it." The captain, Shakib Al Hasan praised Shafiul's performance and his bowling in the following match against the Netherlands. A foot injury meant Shafiul missed both the Tests against the West Indies in November 2011.

In December 2018, he was named in Bangladesh's team for the 2018 ACC Emerging Teams Asia Cup.

== Playing style ==
Champaka Ramanayake, Bangladesh's bowling coach when Shafiul started playing for the team, commented that "Shafiul has lot of skill; has a very good slow bouncer and can bowl the yorker also. He has to be given enough chances to shine and we are very confident that he will come through". He generally bowls at the same length, and the national selectors feel that he needs to vary his bowling more to be effective at Test level.
