= Anusha Samaranayake =

Sri Lankan cricketer (born 1962)

Personal information
- Full name: Aluthge Don Anusha Samaranayake
- Born: 25 February 1962 (age 64); Colombo, Sri Lanka
- Source: ESPNcricinfo, 25 August 2016

Anusha Samaranayake (born 25 February 1962) is a Sri Lankan former first-class cricketer. He is now a bowling coach with the National Coaching Department. In January 2016 he was initially suspended by Sri Lanka Cricket for two months because of match-fixing allegations. However, in August 2016 he was cleared.
