= Sanjit Saha =

Bangladeshi cricketer (born 1997)

Personal information
- Full name: Sanjit Saha
- Born: 4 November 1997 (age 29)
- Batting: Right-handed
- Bowling: Right-arm offbreak

Domestic team information
- Years: Team
- 2015: Rangpur Division
- Source: Cricinfo, 23 December 2015

Sanjit Saha (born 4 November 1997) is a Bangladeshi cricketer who plays for Rangpur Division. He made his first-class debut on 8 February 2015 in the National Cricket League. In December 2015, he was named in Bangladesh's squad for the 2016 Under-19 Cricket World Cup.

In October 2018, he was named in the squad for the Comilla Victorians team, following the draft for the 2018–19 Bangladesh Premier League. He made his Twenty20 debut for the Comilla Victorians in the 2018–19 Bangladesh Premier League on 2 February 2019. In November 2019, he was selected to play for the Rangpur Rangers in the 2019–20 Bangladesh Premier League.
