= Mohor Sheikh =

Bangladeshi cricketer

Personal information
- Born: 21 March 1997 (age 29); Rajshahi, Bangladesh
- Batting: Right-handed
- Bowling: Right-arm medium
- Role: Bowler

Domestic team information
- Years: Team
- 2019: Dhaka Dynamites

Career statistics
Competition	First-class	Twenty20
Matches	4	1
Runs scored	1	0
Batting average	0.33	0.00
100s/50s	0/0	0/0
Top score	1*	0
Balls bowled	664	24
Wickets	17	2
Bowling average	21.94	12.00
5 wickets in innings	2	0
10 wickets in match	0	0
Best bowling	5/24	2/24
Catches/stumpings	0/0	0/0
- Source: Cricinfo, 11 October 2018

Mohor Sheikh Antor (born 21 March 1997) is a Bangladeshi cricketer. He made his first-class debut for Rajshahi Division in the 2018–19 National Cricket League on 8 October 2018. Later the same month, he was named in the Bangladesh Cricket Board XI's squad for a warm-up match against the visiting Zimbabwe team.

In October 2018, he was named in the squad for the Dhaka Dynamites team, following the draft for the 2018–19 Bangladesh Premier League. In December 2018, he was named in Bangladesh's team for the 2018 ACC Emerging Teams Asia Cup.

He made his Twenty20 debut for Dhaka Dynamites in the 2018–19 Bangladesh Premier League on 5 January 2019. He made his List A debut for Prime Bank Cricket Club against Khelaghar in the 2018–19 Dhaka Premier Division Cricket League on 9 March 2019.
