= Indian cricket team in Bangladesh in 2009–10 =

| | Bangladesh | India |
- Dates: 17 January – 28 January 2010
| Captains | Shakib Al Hasan | Virender Sehwag (1st Test); Mahendra Singh Dhoni (2nd Test) |

Test series
- Result: India won the 2-match series 2–0
| Most runs | Tamim Iqbal (234) | Sachin Tendulkar (264) |
| Most wickets | Shakib Al Hasan (9) | Zaheer Khan (15) |
- Player of the series: Zaheer Khan (Ind)

The Indian cricket team toured Bangladesh for two Test matches from 17 January to 28 January 2010. India won the series 2–0, notching up comfortable wins in both Tests.

== Squads ==
| Bangladesh | India |
|---|---|
| Shakib Al Hasan (c) | Mahendra Singh Dhoni (c & wk) |
| Mushfiqur Rahim (vc & wk) | Virender Sehwag (vc) |
| Tamim Iqbal | Gautam Gambhir |
| Imrul Kayes | Rahul Dravid |
| Junaid Siddique | Sachin Tendulkar |
| Mohammad Ashraful | VVS Laxman |
| Raqibul Hasan | Yuvraj Singh |
| Mahmudullah | Harbhajan Singh |
| Shahriar Nafees | Zaheer Khan |
| Shahadat Hossain | Sreesanth |
| Rubel Hossain | Amit Mishra |
| Enamul Haque Jr | Pragyan Ojha |
| Mahbubul Alam | Ishant Sharma |
| Shafiul Islam | Murali Vijay |
| | Dinesh Karthik |
| | Sudeep Tyagi |

== Test series ==
=== 1st Test ===
17–21 January 2010
Scorecard

| India | v | Bangladesh |
| 243 (70.5 overs); Sachin Tendulkar 105* (166); Shakib Al Hasan 5/62 (29.5 overs) | | 242 (65.2 overs); Mahmudullah 69 (108); Zaheer Khan 3/54 (20 overs) |
| 413/8d (87 overs); Gautam Gambhir 116 (129); Mahmudullah 2/52 (13 overs) | | 301 (75.2 overs); Mushfiqur Rahim 101 (114); Amit Mishra 4/92 (22.2 overs) |

India won by 113 runs
Zohur Ahmed Chowdhury Stadium, Chittagong
Umpires: Billy Bowden (NZ) and Marais Erasmus (SA)
Player of the match: Sachin Tendulkar (Ind)

- Bangladesh won the toss and elected to field.
- Shafiul Islam (Ban) made his Test debut.
- Marais Erasmus (SA) stood in his first Test match as an umpire.
- Virender Sehwag captained India in the absence of the injured MS Dhoni.
- Sachin Tendulkar (Ind) became the first cricketer ever to score 13,000 Test runs.

=== 2nd Test ===
24–28 January 2010
Scorecard

| Bangladesh | v | India |
| 233 (73.5 overs); Mahmudullah 96* (156); Ishant Sharma 4/66 (18 overs) | | 544/8d (133 overs); Sachin Tendulkar 143 (182); Shafiul Islam 3/86 (23 overs) |
| 312 (90.3 overs); Tamim Iqbal 151 (183); Zaheer Khan 7/87 (20.3 overs) | | 2/0 (0.2 overs); Virender Sehwag 0* (2); Shakib Al Hasan 0/0 (0.2 overs) |

India won by 10 wickets
Sher-e-Bangla National Cricket Stadium, Mirpur
Umpires: Billy Bowden (NZ) and Marais Erasmus (SA)
Player of the match: Zaheer Khan (Ind)

- Bangladesh won the toss and elected to bat.

== Media coverage ==
=== Television ===
- NEO Cricket (live) - India, Hong Kong, Japan, Taiwan, Korea, Sri Lanka and Bangladesh
- Zee Sports (live) - United States of America
- Commonwealth Broadcasting Network (live) - Canada
- Fox Sports (live) - Australia
- Sky Sports (live) - United Kingdom
- Supersport (live) – South Africa, Kenya and Zimbabwe
- Eurosport (live) - Europe
- StarHub (pay per view) - Malaysia and Singapore
