= Zimbabwean cricket team in Sri Lanka in 2021–22 =

International cricket tour

	Sri Lanka	Zimbabwe
- Dates: 16 – 21 January 2022
Captains	Dasun Shanaka	Craig Ervine

One Day International series
- Results: Sri Lanka won the 3-match series 2–1
Most runs	Charith Asalanka (146); Pathum Nissanka (146)	Sean Williams (154)
Most wickets	Jeffrey Vandersay (9)	Richard Ngarava (6)
- Player of the series: Pathum Nissanka (SL)

The Zimbabwe cricket team toured Sri Lanka in January 2022 to play three One Day International (ODI) matches. The ODI series formed part of the inaugural 2020–2023 ICC Cricket World Cup Super League.

Originally, Zimbabwe were scheduled to tour Sri Lanka in October 2020 to play three ODIs and two Twenty20 International (T20I) matches. The tour was provisionally scheduled for the middle of October 2020 as part of the schedule released by the International Cricket Council in 2018. However, the series did not take place, and was later rescheduled for January 2022. On 4 January 2022, Rumesh Ratnayake was named as interim head coach for Sri Lanka, after Mickey Arthur's contract ended in December 2021. Craig Ervine was again named as Zimbabwe's captain for the tour, after previously leading the team for their visits to Ireland and Scotland in August and September 2021.

Sri Lanka won the opening match by five wickets, with Zimbabwe's Sean Williams top-scoring with a century. Zimbabwe won the second match by 22 runs to level the series. Sri Lanka's Dasun Shanaka scored a century but, just as Sean Williams in the first match, the centurion ended up on the losing side. In the final match of the series, Zimbabwe were bowled out for 70 runs, with Sri Lanka winning by 184 runs to win the series 2–1.

== Squads ==
ODIs
Sri Lanka	Zimbabwe
Dasun Shanaka (c); Charith Asalanka; Ashen Bandara; ~~Minod Bhanuka~~; Dushmantha Chameera; Dinesh Chandimal; Niroshan Dickwella; Shiran Fernando; Chamika Gunasekara; Praveen Jayawickrama; Chamika Karunaratne; Kamindu Mendis; Kusal Mendis; Ramesh Mendis; Pathum Nissanka; Nuwan Pradeep; Maheesh Theekshana; Nuwan Thushara; Jeffrey Vandersay	Craig Ervine (c); Ryan Burl; Regis Chakabva; Tendai Chatara; Luke Jongwe; Takudzwanashe Kaitano; Clive Madande; Wesley Madhevere; Wellington Masakadza; Tinotenda Mutombodzi; Blessing Muzarabani; Richard Ngarava; Sikandar Raza; Milton Shumba; Sean Williams

On 7 January 2022, Sri Lanka Cricket (SLC) lifted the suspensions of Niroshan Dickwella, Danushka Gunathilaka and Kusal Mendis. The players had initially been banned by the SLC from international cricket for one year after breaking COVID-19 bio-bubble rules during the tour of England in July 2021, but became available for selection when their bans were ended early.

Prior to the series, Sri Lanka's vice-captain, Dhananjaya de Silva pulled out of the tour following the birth of his first child. Janith Liyanage, Kamil Mishara and Avishka Fernando were ruled out of the tour, after they each tested positive for COVID-19. Lahiru Kumara and Kalana Perera were not selected due to poor fitness standards. Zimbabwe coach Lalchand Rajput also tested positive ahead of the series, meaning that he would miss at least the first two ODI matches.

Sri Lanka also named Ashen Bandara, Pulina Tharanga, Nimesh Vimukthi, Ashian Daniel, Asitha Fernando and Vishwa Fernando as standby players. Minod Bhanuka was ruled out of Sri Lanka's squad, with Niroshan Dickwella added as his replacement, with Ashen Bandara also added to their main squad.

== ODI series ==
=== 1st ODI ===
16 January 2022
14:30 (D/N)
Scorecard

Zimbabwe; 296/9 (50 overs)	v	Sri Lanka; 300/5 (48.3 overs)
Sean Williams 100 (87); Chamika Karunaratne 3/69 (10 overs)		Pathum Nissanka 75 (71); Richard Ngarava 3/56 (9 overs)

Sri Lanka won by 5 wickets
Pallekele International Cricket Stadium, Kandy
Umpires: Kumar Dharmasena (SL) and Lyndon Hannibal (SL)
Player of the match: Dinesh Chandimal (SL)

- Zimbabwe won the toss and elected to bat.
- Chamika Gunasekara (SL) and Takudzwanashe Kaitano (Zim) both made their ODI debuts.
- Craig Ervine (Zim) played in his 100th ODI.
- World Cup Super League points: Sri Lanka 10, Zimbabwe 0.

=== 2nd ODI ===
18 January 2022
14:30 (D/N)
Scorecard

Zimbabwe; 302/8 (50 overs)	v	Sri Lanka; 280/9 (50 overs)
Craig Ervine 91 (98); Jeffrey Vandersay 3/51 (9 overs)		Dasun Shanaka 102 (94); Tendai Chatara 3/52 (10 overs)

Zimbabwe won by 22 runs
Pallekele International Cricket Stadium, Kandy
Umpires: Kumar Dharmasena (SL) and Raveendra Wimalasiri (SL)
Player of the match: Craig Ervine (Zim)

- Zimbabwe won the toss and elected to bat.
- Dasun Shanaka (SL) scored his first century in ODIs.
- World Cup Super League points: Zimbabwe 10, Sri Lanka 0.

=== 3rd ODI ===
21 January 2022
14:30 (D/N)
Scorecard

Sri Lanka; 254/9 (50 overs)	v	Zimbabwe; 70 (24.4 overs)
Pathum Nissanka 55 (66); Richard Ngarava 2/46 (9 overs)		Takudzwanashe Kaitano 19 (23); Jeffrey Vandersay 4/10 (7.4 overs)

Sri Lanka won by 184 runs
Pallekele International Cricket Stadium, Kandy
Umpires: Kumar Dharmasena (SL) and Prageeth Rambukwella (SL)
Player of the match: Charith Asalanka (SL)

- Sri Lanka won the toss and elected to bat.
- World Cup Super League points: Sri Lanka 10, Zimbabwe 0.
- Tendai Chatara (Zim) took his 100th wicket in ODIs.

== Statistics ==
=== Most runs ===
Rank	Runs	Player	Teams	Innings	Average	High Score	100	50
1	154	Sean Williams	(Zimbabwe)	3	51.33	100	1	-
2	146	Pathum Nissanka	(Sri Lanka)	3	48.67	75	-	2
2	146	Charith Asalanka	(Sri Lanka)	3	48.67	71	-	2
3	127	Dasun Shanaka	(Sri Lanka)	3	63.50	102	1	-
4	120	Regis Chakabva	(Zimbabwe)	3	40.00	72	-	1
5	100	Craig Ervine	(Zimbabwe)	3	33.33	91	-	1
Last Updated: 1 August 2022

=== Most wickets ===
Rank	Wickets	Player	Teams	Innings	Best	Average	Economy
1	9	Jeffrey Vandersay	(Sri Lanka)	3	4/10	11.66	4.63
2	6	Richard Ngarava	(Zimbabwe)	3	3/56	23.83	5.10
3	5	Blessing Muzarabani	(Zimbabwe)	3	3/56	35.40	6.00
3	5	Chamika Karunaratne	(Sri Lanka)	3	3/69	19.48	5.38
4	4	Nuwan Pradeep	(Sri Lanka)	2	2/54	32.00	6.40
4	4	Tendai Chatara	(Zimbabwe)	3	3/52	35.75	5.50
Last Updated: 1 August 2022

Sri Lankan cricket team in Australia in 2021-22
