= Sri Lankan cricket team in India in 2021–22 =

International cricket tour

	India	Sri Lanka
- Dates: 24 February – 16 March 2022
Captains	Rohit Sharma	Dimuth Karunaratne (Tests); Dasun Shanaka (T20Is)

Test series
- Result: India won the 2-match series 2–0
Most runs	Ravindra Jadeja (201)	Dimuth Karunaratne (166)
Most wickets	Ravichandran Ashwin (12)	Lasith Embuldeniya (8)
- Player of the series: Rishabh Pant (Ind)

Twenty20 International series
- Results: India won the 3-match series 3–0
Most runs	Shreyas Iyer (204)	Dasun Shanaka (124)
Most wickets	Bhuvneshwar Kumar (3)	Lahiru Kumara (5)
- Player of the series: Shreyas Iyer (Ind)

The Sri Lankan cricket team toured India in February and March 2022 to play two Test and three Twenty20 International (T20I) matches. The Test series formed part of the 2021–2023 ICC World Test Championship. In September 2021, the Board of Control for Cricket in India (BCCI) confirmed the schedule for the tour. In January 2022, Sri Lanka Cricket made a request to play the T20I matches first, as the T20I squad would be coming straight from their tour of Australia. In early February, the change was agreed by both boards, with Bangalore hosting a day/night Test match, with the BCCI confirming the revised tour schedule.

On 2 February 2022, Sri Lankan fast bowler Suranga Lakmal announced that he would retire from all forms of international cricket following the series. On 19 February 2022, India named their squads for the matches, with Rohit Sharma appointed as their new Test captain. On 26 February 2022, it was announced that the first match of the Test series would be played behind closed doors, with spectators being allowed to attend the second Test match. However, on 1 March 2022, the crowd capacity for the first Test was increased to 50%.

In the first T20I match, India made 199/2 from their 20 overs, going on to win the fixture by 62 runs. India won the second T20I by seven wickets to win the series with a match to play. India won the third and final T20I match by six wickets to win the series 3–0.

The first Test of the series was the 300th to be played by Sri Lanka, and it was also the 100th Test match for India's Virat Kohli. In the Test, Ravindra Jadeja scored 175 not out and took nine wickets. India went on to win the match inside three days, by the margin of an innings and 222 runs. The second Test also finished in three days, with India winning by 238 runs to win the series 2–0.

== Squads ==
Tests		T20Is	
India	Sri Lanka	India	Sri Lanka
Rohit Sharma (c); Jasprit Bumrah (vc); Mayank Agarwal; Ravichandran Ashwin; K. S. Bharat (wk); Shubman Gill; Shreyas Iyer; Ravindra Jadeja; Virat Kohli; Saurabh Kumar; Priyank Panchal; Rishabh Pant (wk); Axar Patel; Mohammed Shami; Mohammed Siraj; Hanuma Vihari; Jayant Yadav; Kuldeep Yadav; Umesh Yadav	Dimuth Karunaratne (c); Dhananjaya de Silva (vc); Charith Asalanka; Dushmantha Chameera; Dinesh Chandimal; Niroshan Dickwella; Lasith Embuldeniya; Vishwa Fernando; Praveen Jayawickrama; Chamika Karunaratne; Lahiru Kumara; Suranga Lakmal; Angelo Mathews; Kusal Mendis; Pathum Nissanka; Lahiru Thirimanne; Jeffrey Vandersay	Rohit Sharma (c); Jasprit Bumrah (vc); Mayank Agarwal; Ravi Bishnoi; Yuzvendra Chahal; ~~Deepak Chahar~~; Ruturaj Gaikwad; Deepak Hooda; Shreyas Iyer; Venkatesh Iyer; Ravindra Jadeja; Avesh Khan; Ishan Kishan (wk); Bhuvneshwar Kumar; Harshal Patel; Sanju Samson (wk); Mohammed Siraj; Kuldeep Yadav; ~~Suryakumar Yadav~~	Dasun Shanaka (c); Charith Asalanka (vc); Dushmantha Chameera; Dinesh Chandimal (wk); Ashian Daniel; Binura Fernando; Shiran Fernando; Danushka Gunathilaka; ~~Wanindu Hasaranga~~; Praveen Jayawickrama; Chamika Karunaratne; Lahiru Kumara; Janith Liyanage; Kusal Mendis; Kamil Mishara; Pathum Nissanka; Maheesh Theekshana; Jeffrey Vandersay

Prior to the T20I matches, Deepak Chahar and Suryakumar Yadav were both ruled out India's squad due to a hamstring injury and a hairline fracture respectively. Both players picked up their injuries during the third and final T20I match against the West Indies. Sri Lanka's Wanindu Hasaranga was also ruled out of the T20I series after not recovering from COVID-19.

After the first T20I match, Maheesh Theekshana and Shiran Fernando were both ruled out of Sri Lanka's squad for the remaining matches due to injuries. Wanindu Hasaranga and Maheesh Theekshana were replaced by Dhananjaya de Silva and Niroshan Dickwella in Sri Lanka's T20I squad. In India's T20I team, Ruturaj Gaikwad was replaced by Mayank Agarwal for the remaining two matches. India's Ishan Kishan was ruled out of the third T20I, after suffering a blow to the head in the second match.

Ahead of the second Test, India released Kuldeep Yadav from their squad, adding Axar Patel in his place. Pathum Nissanka and Dushmantha Chameera were both ruled out of Sri Lanka's squad for the second Test due to injuries.

== T20I series ==
=== 1st T20I ===
24 February 2022
19:00 (N)
Scorecard

India; 199/2 (20 overs)	v	Sri Lanka; 137/6 (20 overs)
Ishan Kishan 89 (56); Dasun Shanaka 1/19 (2 overs)		Charith Asalanka 53* (47); Bhuvneshwar Kumar 2/9 (2 overs)

India won by 62 runs
Ekana Cricket Stadium, Lucknow
Umpires: Jayaraman Madanagopal (Ind) and Virender Sharma (Ind)
Player of the match: Ishan Kishan (Ind)

- Sri Lanka won the toss and elected to field.
- Deepak Hooda (Ind) made his T20I debut.

=== 2nd T20I ===
26 February 2022
19:00 (N)
Scorecard

Sri Lanka; 183/5 (20 overs)	v	India; 186/3 (17.1 overs)
Pathum Nissanka 75 (53); Jasprit Bumrah 1/24 (4 overs)		Shreyas Iyer 74* (44); Lahiru Kumara 2/31 (3 overs)

India won by 7 wickets
Himachal Pradesh Cricket Association Stadium, Dharamshala
Umpires: K. N. Ananthapadmanabhan (Ind) and Jayaraman Madanagopal (Ind)
Player of the match: Shreyas Iyer (Ind)

- India won the toss and elected to field.

=== 3rd T20I ===
27 February 2022
19:00 (N)
Scorecard

Sri Lanka; 146/5 (20 overs)	v	India; 148/4 (16.5 overs)
Dasun Shanaka 74* (38); Avesh Khan 2/23 (4 overs)		Shreyas Iyer 73* (45); Lahiru Kumara 2/39 (3.5 overs)

India won by 6 wickets
Himachal Pradesh Cricket Association Stadium, Dharamshala
Umpires: K. N. Ananthapadmanabhan (Ind) and Virender Sharma (Ind)
Player of the match: Shreyas Iyer (Ind)

- Sri Lanka won the toss and elected to bat.
- Rohit Sharma (Ind) played in his 125th match to become the most capped player in T20Is.

== Test series ==
=== 1st Test ===
4–6 March 2022 (Note: While five days of play were scheduled for each Test, both Tests reached a result in three days.)
Scorecard

India	v	Sri Lanka
574/8d (129.2 overs); Ravindra Jadeja 175* (228); Suranga Lakmal 2/90 (25 overs)		174 (65 overs); Pathum Nissanka 61* (133); Ravindra Jadeja 5/41 (13 overs)
		178 (60 overs) (f/o); Niroshan Dickwella 51* (81); Ravindra Jadeja 4/46 (16 overs)

India won by an innings and 222 runs
Punjab Cricket Association IS Bindra Stadium, Mohali
Umpires: Nitin Menon (Ind) and Virender Sharma (Ind)
Player of the match: Ravindra Jadeja (Ind)

- India won the toss and elected to bat.
- Rohit Sharma (Ind) captained India for the first time in Tests.
- Virat Kohli (Ind) played in his 100th Test, and scored his 8,000th run in Tests.
- World Test Championship points: India 12, Sri Lanka 0.

=== 2nd Test ===
12–16 March 2022 (D/N)
Scorecard

India	v	Sri Lanka
252 (59.1 overs); Shreyas Iyer 92 (98); Praveen Jayawickrama 3/81 (17.1 overs)		109 (35.5 overs); Angelo Mathews 43 (85); Jasprit Bumrah 5/24 (10 overs)
303/9d (68.5 overs); Shreyas Iyer 67 (87); Praveen Jayawickrama 4/78 (19 overs)		208 (59.3 overs); Dimuth Karunaratne 107 (174); Ravichandran Ashwin 4/55 (19.3 overs)

India won by 238 runs
M. Chinnaswamy Stadium, Bangalore
Umpires: Anil Chaudhary (Ind) and Nitin Menon (Ind)
Player of the match: Shreyas Iyer (Ind)

- India won the toss and elected to bat.
- World Test Championship points: India 12, Sri Lanka 0.
