= Sri Lankan cricket team in England in 2021 =

International cricket tour

	England	Sri Lanka
- Dates: 23 June – 4 July 2021
Captains	Eoin Morgan	Kusal Perera

One Day International series
- Results: England won the 3-match series 2–0
Most runs	Joe Root (147)	Wanindu Hasaranga (100)
Most wickets	David Willey (9)	Dushmantha Chameera (3)
- Player of the series: David Willey (Eng)

Twenty20 International series
- Results: England won the 3-match series 3–0
Most runs	Dawid Malan (87)	Dasun Shanaka (65)
Most wickets	Sam Curran (5)	Dushmantha Chameera (6)
- Player of the series: Sam Curran (Eng)

The Sri Lanka cricket team toured England in June and July 2021 to play three One Day International (ODI) and three Twenty20 International (T20I) matches. The ODI series formed part of the inaugural 2020–2023 ICC Cricket World Cup Super League. On 4 June 2021, Sri Lanka Cricket (SLC) named a 24-man squad to tour England. The tour was initially thrown into doubt the next day, when 38 players signed a statement refusing to sign tour contracts with SLC. After an agreement was reached with the players, SLC confirmed that the tour would go ahead as planned.

England won the first two T20Is, by eight wickets and five wickets, respectively, to win the series with a game to spare. England went on to win the final T20I by 89 runs, winning the series 3–0. England also won the first two ODI matches to win the series. The third ODI finished as a no result, after the match was washed out following the completion of Sri Lanka's innings.

== Squads ==
England		Sri Lanka
ODIs	T20Is	ODIs and T20Is
Eoin Morgan (c); Moeen Ali; Tom Banton; Jonny Bairstow (wk); Sam Billings; ~~Jos Buttler (wk)~~; Sam Curran; Tom Curran; Liam Dawson; George Garton; Liam Livingstone; ~~Dawid Malan~~; Adil Rashid; Joe Root; Jason Roy; David Willey; Chris Woakes; Mark Wood	Eoin Morgan (c); Moeen Ali; Jonny Bairstow (wk); Sam Billings; Jos Buttler (wk); Sam Curran; Tom Curran; Liam Dawson; Chris Jordan; Liam Livingstone; Dawid Malan; Adil Rashid; Jason Roy; David Willey; Chris Woakes; Mark Wood	Kusal Perera (c); Charith Asalanka; Dushmantha Chameera; Akila Dananjaya; Dhananjaya de Silva; Niroshan Dickwella; Asitha Fernando; Avishka Fernando; Binura Fernando; Oshada Fernando; Shiran Fernando; Danushka Gunathilaka; Wanindu Hasaranga; Ishan Jayaratne; Praveen Jayawickrama; Chamika Karunaratne; Dhananjaya Lakshan; Kusal Mendis; Ramesh Mendis; Pathum Nissanka; Nuwan Pradeep; Lakshan Sandakan; Dasun Shanaka; Isuru Udana

Sri Lanka did not name individual squads for the ODI and T20I matches, opting instead to name a combined squad of 24 players for the tour. Olly Stone was due to be named in England's ODI squad, but was ruled out of the rest of the season with a stress fracture to his back. As a result, George Garton earned his maiden call-up to the England team. England's Jos Buttler suffered a calf tear in the first T20I and was ruled out of the rest of the series. Dawid Malan was added to England's ODI squad as Buttler's replacement. Sri Lanka's Avishka Fernando was ruled out of the ODI series, after suffering a quadriceps tear in the second T20I match. England's Dawid Malan was also ruled out of the ODI series, for personal reasons. Tom Banton was added to England's squad for the third ODI, as cover for Malan.

On 28 June 2021, Sri Lanka Cricket suspended Kusal Mendis, Danushka Gunathilaka and Niroshan Dickwella after they breached the team's bio-secure bubble. All three players were seen in the city centre of Durham, with them all being sent back home ahead of the ODI matches. In July 2021, Sri Lanka Cricket suspended all three of them from playing in international cricket for one year. Sri Lanka Cricket agreed to lift the ban on all three players early, rescinding the punishment in January 2022.

== Tour matches ==
Ahead of the T20I series, Sri Lanka were scheduled to play two one-day tour matches against Kent and Sussex. However, due to the COVID-19 pandemic, the England and Wales Cricket Board (ECB) confirmed that Sri Lanka would play intra-squad matches instead. A 50-over match and a 20-over match took place at Old Trafford Cricket Ground.

16 June 2021
10:30
Scorecard

Team Mendis; 250/9 (50 overs)	v	Team KJP; 250/9 (50 overs)
Ramesh Mendis 71 (89); Akila Dananjaya 3/28 (10 overs)		Avishka Fernando 64 (71); Asitha Fernando 3/43 (8 overs)

Match tied
Old Trafford Cricket Ground, Manchester

- Team Mendis won the toss and elected to bat.

18 June 2021
18:00 (D/N)
Scorecard

Team Mendis; 219/4 (20 overs)	v	Team KJP; 220/3 (19.2 overs)
Danushka Gunathilaka 98 (52); Dushmantha Chameera 1/18 (2 overs)		Kusal Perera 95 (50); Binura Fernando 2/34 (4 overs)

Team KJP won by 7 wickets
Old Trafford Cricket Ground, Manchester

- Team Mendis won the toss and elected to bat.

== T20I series ==
=== 1st T20I ===
23 June 2021
18:30 (N)
Scorecard

Sri Lanka; 129/7 (20 overs)	v	England; 130/2 (17.1 overs)
Dasun Shanaka 50 (44); Adil Rashid 2/17 (4 overs)		Jos Buttler 68* (55); Dushmantha Chameera 1/24 (3.1 overs)

England won by 8 wickets
Sophia Gardens, Cardiff
Umpires: David Millns (Eng) and Martin Saggers (Eng)
Player of the match: Jos Buttler (Eng)

- Sri Lanka won the toss and elected to bat.

=== 2nd T20I ===
24 June 2021
18:30 (N)
Scorecard

Sri Lanka; 111/7 (20 overs)	v	England; 108/5 (16.1 overs)
Kusal Mendis 39 (39); Mark Wood 2/18 (4 overs)		Liam Livingstone 29* (26); Wanindu Hasaranga 2/20 (4 overs)

England won by 5 wickets (DLS method)
Sophia Gardens, Cardiff
Umpires: Mike Burns (Eng) and Alex Wharf (Eng)
Player of the match: Liam Livingstone (Eng)

- Sri Lanka won the toss and elected to bat.
- England were set a revised target of 103 runs from 18 overs due to rain.

=== 3rd T20I ===
26 June 2021
14:30
Scorecard

England; 180/6 (20 overs)	v	Sri Lanka; 91 (18.5 overs)
Dawid Malan 76 (48); Dushmantha Chameera 4/17 (4 overs)		Binura Fernando 20 (14); David Willey 3/27 (4 overs)

England won by 89 runs
Rose Bowl, Southampton
Umpires: Martin Saggers (Eng) and Alex Wharf (Eng)
Player of the match: Dawid Malan (Eng)

- Sri Lanka won the toss and elected to field.

== ODI series ==
=== 1st ODI ===
29 June 2021
11:00
Scorecard

Sri Lanka; 185 (42.3 overs)	v	England; 189/5 (34.5 overs)
Kusal Perera 73 (81); Chris Woakes 4/18 (10 overs)		Joe Root 79* (87); Dushmantha Chameera 3/50 (8 overs)

England won by 5 wickets
Riverside Ground, Chester-le-Street
Umpires: Michael Gough (Eng) and Tim Robinson (Eng)
Player of the match: Chris Woakes (Eng)

- England won the toss and elected to field.
- Charith Asalanka, Praveen Jayawickrama and Dhananjaya Lakshan (SL) all made their ODI debuts.
- David Willey (Eng) played in his 50th ODI.
- Joe Root (Eng) played in his 150th ODI, and scored his 6,000th run in ODIs.
- Chris Woakes (Eng) took his 150th wicket in ODIs.
- World Cup Super League points: England 10, Sri Lanka 0.

=== 2nd ODI ===
1 July 2021
13:00 (D/N)
Scorecard

Sri Lanka; 241/9 (50 overs)	v	England; 244/2 (43 overs)
Dhananjaya de Silva 91 (91); Sam Curran 5/48 (10 overs)		Eoin Morgan 75* (83); Chamika Karunaratne 1/34 (6 overs)

England won by 8 wickets
The Oval, London
Umpires: Rob Bailey (Eng) and Richard Kettleborough (Eng)
Player of the match: Sam Curran (Eng)

- England won the toss and elected to field.
- Sam Curran (Eng) took his first five-wicket haul in ODIs.
- World Cup Super League points: England 10, Sri Lanka 0.

=== 3rd ODI ===
4 July 2021
11:00
Scorecard

Sri Lanka; 166 (41.1 overs)	v	England
Dasun Shanaka 48* (65); Tom Curran 4/35 (10 overs)

No result
Bristol County Ground, Bristol
Umpires: Michael Gough (Eng) and Tim Robinson (Eng)

- England won the toss and elected to field.
- No further play was possible due to rain.
- World Cup Super League points: England 5, Sri Lanka 5.

== Statistics ==
=== Most runs (T20I) ===
Rank	Runs	Player	Teams	Innings	Average	High Score	Strike Rate	50
1	87	Dawid Malan	(England)	3	29.00	76	129.85	1
2	68	Jos Buttler	(England)	1	-	68*	123.63	1
3	65	Dasun Shanaka	(Sri Lanka)	3	21.66	50	89.04	1
4	64	Jonny Bairstow	(England)	3	32.00	51	110.34	1
5	54	Kusal Mendis	(Sri Lanka)	3	18.00	39	98.18	0
5	54	Kusal Perera	(Sri Lanka)	3	18.00	30	94.73	0
Last Updated: 1 July 2021

=== Most wickets (T20I) ===
Rank	Wickets	Player	Teams	Innings	Best	Average	Economy
1	6	Dushmantha Chameera	(Sri Lanka)	3	4/17	11.66	6.26
2	5	Sam Curran	(England)	3	2/14	9.40	5.22
3	4	Adil Rashid	(England)	3	2/17	12.50	5.55
4	3	David Willey	(England)	2	3/27	14.66	5.50
4	3	Mark Wood	(England)	2	2/18	17.00	6.37
4	3	Chris Jordan	(England)	3	1/13	24.33	6.08
4	3	Isuru Udana	(Sri Lanka)	3	1/25	36.66	9.16
Last Updated: 1 July 2021

=== Most runs (ODI) ===
Rank	Runs	Player	Teams	Innings	Average	High Score	100	50
1	147	Joe Root	(England)	2	-	79*	0	2
2	100	Wanindu Hasaranga	(Sri Lanka)	3	33.33	54	0	1
3	96	Dasun Shanaka	(Sri Lanka)	3	48.00	48*	0	0
4	95	Dhananjaya de Silva	(Sri Lanka)	2	47.50	91	0	1
5	82	Kusal Perera	(Sri Lanka)	3	27.33	73	0	1
Last Updated: 1 July 2021

=== Most wickets (ODI) ===
Rank	Wickets	Player	Teams	Innings	Best	Average	Economy
1	9	David Willey	(England)	3	4/64	16.00	5.33
2	6	Chris Woakes	(England)	2	4/18	7.66	2.30
3	5	Sam Curran	(England)	3	5/48	24.60	5.19
4	4	Tom Curran	(England)	2	4/35	19.50	3.90
5	3	Dushmantha Chameera	(Sri Lanka)	2	3/50	32.00	5.64
Last Updated: 1 July 2021

Indian cricket team in Sri Lanka in 2021
