= Rumesh Ratnayake =

Sri Lankan cricketer

Rumesh Ratnayake රුමේෂ් රත්නායක
Personal information
- Full name: Rumesh Joseph Ratnayake
- Born: 2 January 1964 (age 62)
- Batting: Right-handed
- Bowling: Right-arm fast-medium
- Role: Bowler

International information
- National side: Sri Lanka (1982–1993)
- Test debut (cap 21): 4 March 1983 v New Zealand
- Last Test: 2 January 1992 v Pakistan
- ODI debut (cap 28): 26 September 1982 v India
- Last ODI: 1 December 1993 v West Indies

Career statistics
Competition	Test	ODI
Matches	23	70
Runs scored	433	612
Batting average	14.43	16.54
100s/50s	0/2	0/0
Top score	56	33*
Balls bowled	4,961	3575
Wickets	73	76
Bowling average	35.10	35.68
5 wickets in innings	5	1
10 wickets in match	0	0
Best bowling	6/66	5/32
Catches/stumpings	9/–	11/–
- Source: Cricinfo, 3 March 2016

Rumesh Joseph Ratnayake (born 2 January 1964), is a former Sri Lankan cricketer who played in 23 Test matches and 70 One Day Internationals from 1982 to 1993. He was an interim head coach of Sri Lanka national cricket team in 2017.

Ratnayake was born in Colombo. During a career often blighted by injury, he was a strapping right arm fast-medium bowler who was capable of swinging the new ball and generating considerable pace and bounce. He spearheaded the Sri Lankan fast bowling attack in his heyday although his international career was relatively short due to being injury prone. He was also a more than useful hard-hitting lower order batsman, as Test match fifties against Pakistan and England testify. He is usually known for his appointments as interim coach of Sri Lanka national cricket teamusually in between permanent appointments. He also works as fast bowling coach being attached to the High Performance Center of Sri Lanka Cricket on a full-time basis.

== International career ==
One of Ratnayake's best performances came in the 1985/86 series against India, taking 20 wickets at 22 for the series. In the 2nd Test he managed 9 wickets in the match which gave Sri Lanka a rare Test win, and inaugural series victory. Other good hauls include 6 for 66 against Australia at Hobart in 1990/91 and 5 for 69 against England at Lord's. His bowling spell of 6/66 was instrumental in restricting Australia for 224.

== After retirement ==
In July 2001, Ratnayake became the administrative team manager for the Sri Lankan national cricket team.

In 2003, Ratnayake was a development officer for the Asian Cricket Council and was a coach and selector for the Asian Dream Team, a composite team of lesser Asian cricketing nations that played 6 matches in Sri Lanka that year.

Ratnayake was in May 2007 linked with the Sri Lankan national cricket team assistant coaching job with some saying he had been given the interim coaching job. Ultimately it was the deputy's job that he was offered, and later declined in June 2007.:

He has also advised cricket hopefuls in Canada.

In August 2011, he became the head coach of Sri Lankan national team. On 8 August 2017, after Champaka Ramanayake resigned, Ratnayake was again appointed as the fast bowling coach of the national team.

In January 2022, he was appointed as the interim coach of Sri Lankan team for the home bilateral ODI series against Zimbabwe in the absence of Mickey Arthur whose contract with the national team as head coach had expired on 4 December 2021. He was persisted as the interim coach of Sri Lankan team for the five match T20I series against Australia in February 2021 and for the bilateral series against India in March 2021. It has been revealed that the unprofessionalism and lackluster attitude of Sri Lanka cricket in finding the head coach after the departure of Mickey Arthur resulted in extended coaching gig for Ratnayake.He is the current head coach of the Sri Lankan women's cricket team
