= Afghan cricket team in Sri Lanka in 2023–24 =

International cricket tour

| | Sri Lanka | Afghanistan |
- Dates: 2 – 21 February 2024
| Captains | Dhananjaya de Silva (Test); Kusal Mendis (ODIs); Wanindu Hasaranga (T20Is) | Hashmatullah Shahidi (Test & ODIs); Ibrahim Zadran (T20Is) |

Test series
- Result: Sri Lanka won the 1-match series 1–0
| Most runs | Angelo Mathews (141) | Rahmat Shah (145) |
| Most wickets | Prabath Jayasuriya (8) | Naveed Zadran (4) |

One Day International series
- Results: Sri Lanka won the 3-match series 3–0
| Most runs | Pathum Nissanka (346) | Azmatullah Omarzai (206) |
| Most wickets | Pramod Madushan (8) | Qais Ahmad (3); Azmatullah Omarzai (3) |
- Player of the series: Pathum Nissanka (SL)

Twenty20 International series
- Results: Sri Lanka won the 3-match series 2–1
| Most runs | Wanindu Hasaranga (102) | Rahmanullah Gurbaz (96) |
| Most wickets | Matheesha Pathirana (8) | Fazalhaq Farooqi (4); Mohammad Nabi (4); Azmatullah Omarzai (4) |
- Player of the series: Wanindu Hasaranga (SL)

The Afghanistan cricket team toured Sri Lanka in February 2024. The tour consisted of one Test, three One Day International (ODI) and three Twenty20 International (T20I) matches. In November 2023, Sri Lanka Cricket (SLC) announced its international calendar for 2024 and confirmed the bilateral series. In January 2024, the Afghanistan Cricket Board (ACB) confirmed the fixtures for the tour.

This was the first Test match played between the two sides. The T20I series formed part of both teams' preparation for the 2024 ICC Men's T20 World Cup.

Prior to the start of the third ODI match on 14 February 2024, Sri Lankan cricketers wore blackarm bands as a mark of respect for the former Sri Lanka Cricket administrator Trevor Rajaratnam who died on 13 February 2024 due to age-related ailments.

== Squads ==
| Sri Lanka | | | Afghanistan | | |
| Test | ODIs | T20Is | Test | ODIs | T20Is |
|---|---|---|---|---|---|
| Dhananjaya de Silva (c); Kusal Mendis (vc); Dinesh Chandimal; Asitha Fernando; Vishwa Fernando; Chamika Gunasekara; Prabath Jayasuriya; Dimuth Karunaratne; Nishan Madushka; Angelo Mathews; Kamindu Mendis; Ramesh Mendis; Kasun Rajitha; Milan Rathnayake; Sadeera Samarawickrama; Lahiru Udara | Kusal Mendis (c); Charith Asalanka (vc); Sahan Arachchige; Dushmantha Chameera; Akila Dananjaya; Shevon Daniel; Asitha Fernando; Avishka Fernando; Wanindu Hasaranga; Chamika Karunaratne; Janith Liyanage; Pramod Madushan; Dilshan Madushanka; Pathum Nissanka; Sadeera Samarawickrama (wk); Maheesh Theekshana; Dunith Wellalage | Wanindu Hasaranga (c); Charith Asalanka (vc); Akila Dananjaya; Dhananjaya de Silva; Binura Fernando; Dilshan Madushanka; Angelo Mathews; Kamindu Mendis; Kusal Mendis; Pathum Nissanka; Matheesha Pathirana; Kusal Perera; Sadeera Samarawickrama; Dasun Shanaka; Nuwan Thushara; Maheesh Theekshana | Hashmatullah Shahidi (c); Rahmat Shah (vc); Qais Ahmad; Yamin Ahmadzai; Ikram Alikhil (wk); Mohammad Ishaq (wk); Nasir Jamal; Zahir Khan; Abdul Malik; Nijat Masood; Mohammad Saleem; Bahir Shah; Ibrahim Zadran; Naveed Zadran; Noor Ali Zadran; Zia-ur-Rehman | Hashmatullah Shahidi (c); Rahmat Shah (vc); Fareed Ahmad; Noor Ahmad; Qais Ahmad; Ikram Alikhil (wk); Sharafuddin Ashraf; Fazalhaq Farooqi; Rahmanullah Gurbaz (wk); Riaz Hassan; ~~Mujeeb Ur Rahman~~; Gulbadin Naib; Mohammad Nabi; Azmatullah Omarzai; Ibrahim Zadran; Naveed Zadran | Ibrahim Zadran (c); Fareed Ahmad; Noor Ahmad; Qais Ahmad; Sharafuddin Ashraf; Fazalhaq Farooqi; Rahmanullah Gurbaz (wk); Mohammad Ishaq (wk); Karim Janat; Wafadar Momand; Gulbadin Naib; Mohammad Nabi; Naveen-ul-Haq; Azmatullah Omarzai; Najibullah Zadran; Hazratullah Zazai |

On 3 January 2024, Dhananjaya de Silva and Kusal Mendis were appointed Sri Lanka's Test captain and vice-captain respectively. With Mendis and Wanindu Hasaranga were appointed as Sri Lanka's ODI and T20I captain respectively, this was the first time Sri Lanka had three different captains in the three formats.

Afghanistan also named Sharafuddin Ashraf, Shahidullah, Abdul Rahman and Bilal Sami as reserves for the ODI series.

Afghanistan's Mujeeb Ur Rahman was ruled out of ODI series due to an injury. For the last ODI, Sharafuddin Ashraf was added to the Afghanistan's squad as his replacement.

On 11 February 2024, Asitha Fernando replaced injured Dushmantha Chameera in the Sri Lanka's squad for the last two ODIs.

== Only Test ==
2–5 February 2024
Scorecard

| Afghanistan | v | Sri Lanka |
| 198 (62.4 overs); Rahmat Shah 91 (139); Vishwa Fernando 4/51 (12 overs) | | 439 (109.2 overs); Angelo Mathews 141 (259); Naveed Zadran 4/83 (22.5 overs) |
| 296 (112.3 overs); Ibrahim Zadran 114 (259); Prabath Jayasuriya 5/107 (47 overs) | | 56/0 (7.2 overs); Dimuth Karunaratne 32* (22) |

Sri Lanka won by 10 wickets
Singhalese Sports Club Cricket Ground, Colombo
Umpires: Chris Brown (NZ) and Michael Gough (Eng)
Player of the match: Prabath Jayasuriya (SL)

- Sri Lanka won the toss and elected to field.
- Chamika Gunasekara (SL), Noor Ali Zadran, Zia-ur-Rehman, Mohammad Saleem and Naveed Zadran (Afg) all made their Test debuts.
- Dhananjaya de Silva captained Sri Lanka for the first time in Tests.
- Kasun Rajitha replaced Chamika Gunasekara as concussion substitute for Sri Lanka on day 3 during Afghanistan's second innings.
- Ibrahim Zadran (Afg) scored his first century in Tests.

== ODI series ==
=== 1st ODI ===
9 February 2024
14:30 (D/N)
Scorecard

| Sri Lanka; 381/3 (50 overs) | v | Afghanistan; 339/6 (50 overs) |
| Pathum Nissanka 210* (139); Fareed Ahmad 2/79 (9 overs) | | Azmatullah Omarzai 149* (115); Pramod Madushan 4/75 (10 overs) |

Sri Lanka won by 42 runs
Pallekele International Cricket Stadium, Kandy
Umpires: Alex Wharf (Eng) and Raveendra Wimalasiri (SL)
Player of the match: Pathum Nissanka (SL)

- Afghanistan won the toss and elected to field.
- Pathum Nissanka (SL) became the first Sri Lankan to score an ODI double century.
- Afghanistan scored their highest total in ODIs.

=== 2nd ODI ===
11 February 2024
14:30 (D/N)
Scorecard

| Sri Lanka; 308/6 (50 overs) | v | Afghanistan; 153 (33.5 overs) |
| Charith Asalanka 97* (74); Azmatullah Omarzai 3/56 (10 overs) | | Rahmat Shah 63 (69); Wanindu Hasaranga 4/27 (6.5 overs) |

Sri Lanka won by 155 runs
Pallekele International Cricket Stadium, Kandy
Umpires: Alex Wharf (Eng) and Prageeth Rambukwella (SL)
Player of the match: Charith Asalanka (SL)

- Sri Lanka won the toss and elected to bat.

=== 3rd ODI ===
14 February 2024
14:30 (D/N)
Scorecard

| Afghanistan; 266 (48.2 overs) | v | Sri Lanka; 267/3 (35.2 overs) |
| Rahmat Shah 65 (77); Pramod Madushan 3/45 (8.2 overs) | | Pathum Nissanka 118 (101); Qais Ahmed 2/46 (7 overs) |

Sri Lanka won by 7 wickets
Pallekele International Cricket Stadium, Kandy
Umpires: Raveendra Wimalasiri (SL) and Michael Gough (Eng)
Player of the match: Pathum Nissanka (SL)

- Afghanistan won the toss and elected to bat.
- Pathum Nissanka became the fastest batsman for Sri Lanka, to reach 2,000 runs in ODIs, in terms of innings (52).

== T20I series ==
=== 1st T20I ===
17 February 2024
19:00 (N)
Scorecard

| Sri Lanka; 160 (19 overs) | v | Afghanistan; 156/9 (20 overs) |
| Wanindu Hasaranga 67 (32); Fazalhaq Farooqi 3/25 (4 overs) | | Ibrahim Zadran 67* (55); Matheesha Pathirana 4/24 (4 overs) |

Sri Lanka won by 4 runs
Rangiri Dambulla International Stadium, Dambulla
Umpires: Prageeth Rambukwella (SL) and Raveendra Wimalasiri (SL)
Player of the match: Matheesha Pathirana (SL)

- Afghanistan won the toss and elected to field.
- This was the first men's T20I to be played at the venue.

=== 2nd T20I ===
19 February 2024
19:00 (N)
Scorecard

| Sri Lanka; 187/6 (20 overs) | v | Afghanistan; 115 (17 overs) |
| Sadeera Samarawickrama 51 (42); Mohammed Nabi 2/25 (4 overs) | | Karim Janat 28 (23); Angelo Mathews 2/9 (2 overs) |

Sri Lanka won by 72 runs
Rangiri Dambulla International Stadium, Dambulla
Umpires: Lyndon Hannibal (SL) and Prageeth Rambukwella (SL)
Player of the match: Angelo Mathews (SL)

- Afghanistan won the toss and elected to field.
- Wanindu Hasaranga (SL) became the second fastest cricketer to take 100 T20I wickets, in terms of number of matches played (63).

=== 3rd T20I ===
21 February 2024
19:00 (N)
Scorecard

| Afghanistan; 209/5 (20 overs) | v | Sri Lanka; 206/6 (20 overs) |
| Rahmanullah Gurbaz 70 (43); Akila Dananjaya 2/37 (4 overs) | | Kamindu Mendis 65* (39); Mohammad Nabi 2/35 (4 overs) |

Afghanistan won by 3 runs
Rangiri Dambulla International Stadium, Dambulla
Umpires: Lyndon Hannibal (SL) and Raveendra Wimalasiri (SL)
Player of the match: Rahmanullah Gurbaz (Afg)

- Afghanistan won the toss and elected to bat.
- Mohammad Ishaq (Afg) made his T20I debut.
- Qais Ahmad replaced Sharafuddin Ashraf as concussion substitute for Afghanistan during the second innings.
