= Bangladeshi cricket team in Sri Lanka in 2025 =

International cricket tour

	Sri Lanka	Bangladesh
- Dates: 17 June – 16 July 2025
Captains	Dhananjaya de Silva (Tests); Charith Asalanka (ODIs & T20Is)	Najmul Hossain Shanto (Tests); Mehidy Hasan Miraz (ODIs); Litton Das (T20Is)

Test series
- Result: Sri Lanka won the 2-match series 1–0
Most runs	Pathum Nissanka (369)	Najmul Hossain Shanto (300)
Most wickets	Tharindu Ratnayake (9)	Nayeem Hasan (9); Taijul Islam (9)
- Player of the series: Pathum Nissanka (SL)

One Day International series
- Results: Sri Lanka won the 3-match series 2–1
Most runs	Kusal Mendis (225)	Parvez Hossain Emon (108)
Most wickets	Wanindu Hasaranga (9)	Tanvir Islam (7)
- Player of the series: Kusal Mendis (SL)

Twenty20 International series
- Results: Bangladesh won the 3-match series 2–1
Most runs	Pathum Nissanka (120)	Litton Das (114)
Most wickets	Binura Fernando (3); Maheesh Theekshana (3)	Mahedi Hasan (4); Rishad Hossain (4)
- Player of the series: Litton Das (Ban)

The Bangladesh cricket team toured Sri Lanka in June and July 2025 to play the Sri Lanka cricket team. The tour consisted of two Test, three One Day International (ODI) and three Twenty20 Internationals (T20I) matches. The Test series formed part of the 2025–2027 ICC World Test Championship. In May 2025, the Sri Lanka Cricket Board (SLC) announced the schedule of the series.

Bangladesh registered their first-ever T20I series win over Sri Lanka.

== Squads ==
Sri Lanka			Bangladesh		
Tests	ODIs	T20Is	Tests	ODIs	T20Is
Dhananjaya de Silva (c); Dinesh Chandimal (wk); Akila Dananjaya; Sonal Dinusha; Asitha Fernando; Oshada Fernando; Vishwa Fernando (Note: Only for the 2nd Test); Prabath Jayasuriya; Angelo Mathews (Note: Only for the 1st Test); Kamindu Mendis; Kusal Mendis (wk); Pathum Nissanka; Kasun Rajitha; Milan Rathnayake; Pavan Rathnayake; Tharindu Rathnayake; Pasindu Sooriyabandara; Lahiru Udara (wk); Dunith Wellalage; Isitha Wijesundara	Charith Asalanka (c); Dushmantha Chameera; Asitha Fernando; Avishka Fernando; Wanindu Hasaranga; Janith Liyanage; Dilshan Madushanka; Nishan Madushka (wk); Eshan Malinga; Kamindu Mendis; Kusal Mendis (wk); Pathum Nissanka; Milan Rathnayake; Sadeera Samarawickrama (wk); Maheesh Theekshana; Jeffrey Vandersay; Dunith Wellalage	Charith Asalanka (c); Dinesh Chandimal (wk); Avishka Fernando; Binura Fernando; ~~Wanindu Hasaranga~~; Chamika Karunaratne; Eshan Malinga; Kamindu Mendis; Kusal Mendis (wk); Pathum Nissanka; Matheesha Pathirana; Kusal Perera; Dasun Shanaka; Maheesh Theekshana; Nuwan Thushara; Jeffrey Vandersay; Dunith Wellalage	Najmul Hossain Shanto (c); Mehidy Hasan Miraz (vc); Khaled Ahmed; Jaker Ali (wk); Mahidul Islam Ankon; Litton Das (wk); Anamul Haque; Mominul Haque; Nayeem Hasan; Ebadot Hossain; Shadman Islam; Taijul Islam; Hasan Mahmud; Hasan Murad; Mushfiqur Rahim (wk); Nahid Rana	Mehidy Hasan Miraz (c); Taskin Ahmed; Jaker Ali (wk); Litton Das (wk); Parvez Hossain Emon; Tanzid Hasan; Rishad Hossain; Shamim Hossain; Towhid Hridoy; Tanvir Islam; Hasan Mahmud; Mohammad Naim; Mustafizur Rahman; Nahid Rana; Tanzim Hasan Sakib; Najmul Hossain Shanto	Litton Das (c, wk); Nasum Ahmed; Taskin Ahmed; Jaker Ali (wk); Parvez Hossain Emon; Mahedi Hasan; Tanzid Hasan; Rishad Hossain; Shamim Hossain; Towhid Hridoy; Shoriful Islam; Mehidy Hasan Miraz; Mohammad Naim; Mustafizur Rahman; Mohammad Saifuddin; Tanzim Hasan Sakib

On 23 June, Milan Rathnayake was ruled out of the second Test due to a left-side strain. Sri Lanka also added Vishwa Fernando and Dunith Wellalage into the squad. On 30 June, Dushmantha Chameera was added to the ODI squad. On 9 July, Wanindu Hasaranga was ruled out of the T20I series due to hamstring injury in his right leg.

== Test series ==
=== 1st Test ===
17–21 June 2025
Scorecard

Bangladesh	v	Sri Lanka
495 (153.4 overs); Mushfiqur Rahim 163 (350); Asitha Fernando 4/86 (29.4 overs)		485 (131.2 overs); Pathum Nissanka 187 (256); Nayeem Hasan 5/121 (43.2 overs)
285/6d (87 overs); Najmul Hossain Shanto 125* (199); Tharindu Rathnayake 3/102 (29 overs)		72/4 (32 overs); Pathum Nissanka 24 (25); Taijul Islam 3/23 (16 overs)

Match drawn
Galle International Stadium, Galle
Umpires: Rod Tucker (Aus) and Alex Wharf (Eng)
Player of the match: Najmul Hossain Shanto (Ban)

- Bangladesh won the toss and elected to bat.
- Only 61 overs were bowled in the second day due to rain.
- Lahiru Udara and Tharindu Rathnayake (SL) both made their Test debuts.
- Pathum Nissanka (SL) reached 1,000 Test runs and scored his first Test century on home soil. He also achieved his highest individual Test score in a match against Bangladesh.
- Najmul Hossain Shanto (Ban) became the first Bangladeshi captain who scored centuries in both innings of a Test match.
- Angelo Mathews (SL) played his last Test match.
- World Test Championship points: Sri Lanka 4, Bangladesh 4.

=== 2nd Test ===
25–28 June 2025
Scorecard

Bangladesh	v	Sri Lanka
247 (79.3 overs); Shadman Islam 46 (93); Sonal Dinusha 3/22 (9.3 overs)		458 (116.5 overs); Pathum Nissanka 158 (254); Taijul Islam 5/131 (42.5 overs)
133 (44.2 overs); Mushfiqur Rahim 26 (53); Prabath Jayasuriya 5/56 (18 overs)

Sri Lanka won by an innings and 78 runs
Sinhalese Sports Club Cricket Ground, Colombo
Umpires: Allahudien Paleker (SA) and Prageeth Rambukwella (SL) (Note: Prageeth Rambukwella replaced Alex Wharf on Day 1, and in doing so he made his Test debut as umpire.)
Player of the match: Pathum Nissanka (SL)

- Bangladesh won the toss and elected to bat.
- Only 71 overs play was possible on day 1 due to rain.
- Sonal Dinusha (SL) made his Test debut.
- Litton Das (Ban) played his 50th Test and set a new record for the most dismissals by a wicketkeeper in Test cricket for Bangladesh, surpassing Mushfiqur Rahim.
- World Test Championship points: Sri Lanka 12, Bangladesh 0.

== ODI series ==
=== 1st ODI ===
2 July 2025
14:30 (D/N)
Scorecard

Sri Lanka; 244 (49.2 overs)	v	Bangladesh; 167 (35.5 overs)
Charith Asalanka 106 (123); Taskin Ahmed 4/47 (10 overs)		Tanzid Hasan 62 (61); Wanindu Hasaranga 4/10 (7.5 overs)

Sri Lanka won by 77 runs
R. Premadasa Stadium, Colombo
Umpires: Allahudien Paleker (SA) and Ruchira Palliyaguruge (SL)
Player of the match: Charith Asalanka (SL)

- Sri Lanka won the toss and elected to bat.
- Milan Rathnayake (SL), Parvez Hossain Emon and Tanvir Islam (Ban) all made their ODI debuts.
- Wanindu Hasaranga (SL) took his 100th wicket in ODIs.

=== 2nd ODI ===
5 July 2025
14:30 (D/N)
Scorecard

Bangladesh; 248 (45.5 overs)	v	Sri Lanka; 232 (48.5 overs)
Parvez Hossain Emon 67 (69); Asitha Fernando 4/35 (9 overs)		Janith Liyanage 78 (85); Tanvir Islam 5/39 (10 overs)

Bangladesh won by 16 runs
R. Premadasa Stadium, Colombo
Umpires: Ruchira Palliyaguruge (SL) and Asif Yaqoob (Pak)
Player of the match: Tanvir Islam (Ban)

- Bangladesh won the toss and elected to bat.
- Towhid Hridoy (Ban) scored his 1,000th run in ODIs.
- Tanvir Islam (Ban) took his first five-wicket haul in ODIs.

=== 3rd ODI ===
8 July 2025
14:30 (D/N)
Scorecard

Sri Lanka; 285/7 (50 overs)	v	Bangladesh; 186 (39.4 overs)
Kusal Mendis 124 (114); Mehidy Hasan Miraz 2/48 (10 overs)		Towhid Hridoy 51 (78); Asitha Fernando 3/33 (7 overs)

Sri Lanka won by 99 runs
Pallekele International Cricket Stadium, Kandy
Umpires: Allahudien Paleker (SA) and Raveendra Wimalasiri (SL)
Player of the match: Kusal Mendis (SL)

- Sri Lanka won the toss and elected to bat.

== T20I series ==
=== 1st T20I ===
10 July 2025
19:00 (N)
Scorecard

Bangladesh; 154/5 (20 overs)	v	Sri Lanka; 159/3 (19 overs)
Parvez Hossain Emon 38 (22); Maheesh Theekshana 2/37 (4 overs)		Kusal Mendis 73 (51); Mohammad Saifuddin 1/22 (3 overs)

Sri Lanka won by 7 wickets
Pallekele International Cricket Stadium, Kandy
Umpires: Ruchira Palliyaguruge (SL) and Raveendra Wimalasiri (SL)
Player of the match: Kusal Mendis (SL)

- Sri Lanka won the toss and elected to field.

=== 2nd T20I ===
13 July 2025
19:00 (N)
Scorecard

Bangladesh; 177/7 (20 overs)	v	Sri Lanka; 94 (15.2 overs)
Litton Das 76 (50); Binura Fernando 3/31 (4 overs)		Pathum Nissanka 32 (29); Rishad Hossain 3/18 (3.2 overs)

Bangladesh won by 83 runs
Rangiri Dambulla International Stadium, Dambulla
Umpires: Prageeth Rambukwella (SL) and Raveendra Wimalasiri (SL)
Player of the match: Litton Das (Ban)

- Sri Lanka won the toss and elected to field.

=== 3rd T20I ===
16 July 2025
19:00 (N)
Scorecard

Sri Lanka; 132/7 (20 overs)	v	Bangladesh; 133/2 (16.3 overs)
Pathum Nissanka 46 (39); Mahedi Hasan 4/11 (4 overs)		Tanzid Hasan 73* (47); Kamindu Mendis 1/21 (3 overs)

Bangladesh won by 8 wickets
R. Premadasa Stadium, Colombo
Umpires: Ruchira Palliyaguruge (SL) and Raveendra Wimalasiri (SL)
Player of the match: Mahedi Hasan (Ban)

- Sri Lanka won the toss and elected to bat.
- Mahedi Hasan (Ban) took his 50th wicket in T20Is.
