= Bangladeshi cricket team in Sri Lanka in 2020–21 =

International cricket tour

	Sri Lanka	Bangladesh
- Dates: 21 April – 3 May 2021
Captains	Dimuth Karunaratne	Mominul Haque

Test series
- Result: Sri Lanka won the 2-match series 1–0
Most runs	Dimuth Karunaratne (428)	Tamim Iqbal (280)
Most wickets	Praveen Jayawickrama (11)	Taskin Ahmed (8); Taijul Islam (8)
- Player of the series: Dimuth Karunaratne (SL)

The Bangladesh cricket team toured Sri Lanka in April and May 2021 to play two Test matches. The Test series formed part of the inaugural 2019–2021 ICC World Test Championship.

Originally, a three-Test tour was scheduled to take place in July and August 2020, but it was postponed to October 2020 due to the COVID-19 pandemic. In September 2020, the tour was postponed again, after both boards could not agree on the quarantine requirements for the series. In December 2020, the Bangladesh Cricket Board (BCB) were considering touring Sri Lanka in April 2021 to play two Test matches. In February 2021, the BCB confirmed that the tour of Sri Lanka would take place in April. On 19 March 2021, Sri Lanka Cricket (SLC) announced the dates for the tour.

The first Test match finished as a high-scoring draw, after rain wiped out the final session on the fifth day. Sri Lanka won the second Test by 209 runs to win the series 1–0.

== Background ==
In May 2020, Nizamuddin Chowdhury, CEO of the Bangladesh Cricket Board (BCB), confirmed that they were in discussions with Sri Lanka Cricket (SLC) regarding the series. BCB President Nazmul Hasan said that their priority were ICC events, and they would wait to see what the ICC and Asian Cricket Council (ACC) did first. However, on 24 June 2020, the tour was postponed due to the pandemic. In July 2020, both cricket boards were looking at the possibility of rescheduling the tour for October 2020. Also in July 2020, the International Cricket Council (ICC) confirmed it was their priority to reschedule the matches, along with the five other World Test Championship series that had been postponed due to the pandemic.

In August 2020, both cricket boards were looking to play a combination of Test matches and Twenty20 International (T20I) matches, with a possible start date in October 2020. On 12 August 2020, the BCB confirmed they would travel to Sri Lanka, leaving for the country on 23 September 2020. On 12 September 2020, Sri Lanka Cricket confirmed that the Bangladesh team would need to quarantine for one week on arrival in the country before they can begin to train. The following day, Sri Lanka Cricket increased the quarantine period to 14 days, with the BCB disagreeing to the length of time their players would be quarantine and the lack of preparation time ahead of the first Test match. In response, Sri Lanka Cricket suggested that the quarantine could be split into two phases, with seven days done in Bangladesh, and the remaining seven days done once the team arrives in Sri Lanka.

On 19 September 2020, Bangladesh named a preliminary squad of 27 players to begin training ahead of the tour. However, the following day, one player had to isolate after showing COVID-19 symptoms, along with anyone who came into close contact with him. On 28 September 2020, the tour was postponed again as both boards could not decide on quarantine requirements for the series. SLC insisted on a 14-day quarantine following guidelines from the Sri Lanka government, while the BCB insisted on a shorter length.

In December 2020, the BCB began talks with Sri Lanka Cricket tour play a short tour in April 2021. Instead of the original three Tests that were scheduled to be played, the revised tour would have two Test matches, with the possibility of some white-ball matches as well. In February 2021, the BCB allowed Shakib Al Hasan to miss the tour, allowing him to take part in the 2021 Indian Premier League, with the BCB confirming that the tour will take place in April. The following month, the BCB announced that the 2020–21 National Cricket League (NCL) tournament would be used as preparation for the Test matches. However, after only two rounds of matches, the NCL was postponed due to the COVID-19 pandemic. Despite the curtailment of the tournament, the BCB were still hopeful of touring Sri Lanka. On 12 April 2021, the Bangladesh cricket team arrived in Sri Lanka.

== Squads ==
Tests
Sri Lanka	Bangladesh
Dimuth Karunaratne (c); Dinesh Chandimal; Dhananjaya de Silva; Niroshan Dickwella (wk); Asitha Fernando; Oshada Fernando; Vishwa Fernando; Wanindu Hasaranga; Praveen Jayawickrama; Chamika Karunaratne; Lahiru Kumara; Suranga Lakmal; Dilshan Madushanka; Angelo Mathews; Ramesh Mendis; Pathum Nissanka; Lakshan Sandakan; Dasun Shanaka; Roshen Silva; Lahiru Thirimanne	Mominul Haque (c); Taskin Ahmed; Yasir Ali; Litton Das (wk); Mehidy Hasan; Saif Hassan; Ebadot Hossain; Tamim Iqbal; Shadman Islam; Shoriful Islam; Taijul Islam; Abu Jayed; Mohammad Mithun; Mushfiqur Rahim; Najmul Hossain Shanto

On 9 April 2021, the BCB announced a 21-man preliminary squad for the two Test matches. The final 15-man squad for the Test series was confirmed following the two-day inter-squad warm-up match. Sri Lanka also named a preliminary squad, with bowler Dushmantha Chameera opting out of the tour due to taking paternity leave. Lahiru Kumara suffered an injury during the third day of the first Test, and was ruled out of Sri Lanka's squad for the remainder of the series. On 26 April 2021, Lakshan Sandakan and Chamika Karunaratne were named as replacements for Lahiru Kumara and Dilshan Madushanka in Sri Lanaka's squad.

== Warm-up match ==
17–18 April 2021
Scorecard

Bangladesh Team Red	v	Bangladesh Team Green
314/6d (79.2 overs); Mushfiqur Rahim 66 (82); Shuvagata Hom 1/46 (11.2 overs)		225 (71 overs); Litton Das 64; Mehidy Hasan 3/41

Match drawn
Chilaw Marians Cricket Club Ground, Katunayake

- Toss uncontested.

== Test series ==
=== 1st Test ===
21–25 April 2021
Scorecard

Bangladesh	v	Sri Lanka
541/7d (173 overs); Najmul Hossain Shanto 163 (378); Vishwa Fernando 4/96 (35 overs)		648/8d (179 overs); Dimuth Karunaratne 244 (437); Taskin Ahmed 3/112 (30 overs)
100/2 (33 overs); Tamim Iqbal 74* (98); Suranga Lakmal 2/21 (8 overs)

Match drawn
Pallekele International Cricket Stadium, Kandy
Umpires: Kumar Dharmasena (SL) and Ruchira Palliyaguruge (SL)
Player of the match: Dimuth Karunaratne (SL)

- Bangladesh won the toss and elected to bat.
- 25 overs of play were lost on day 2 due to bad light.
- No play was possible after tea on day 5 due to rain.
- Najmul Hossain Shanto (Ban) scored his first century in Tests.
- Dimuth Karunaratne (SL) scored his first double century in Tests.
- World Test Championship points: Sri Lanka 20, Bangladesh 20.

=== 2nd Test ===
29 April–3 May 2021
Scorecard

Sri Lanka	v	Bangladesh
493/7d (159.2 overs); Lahiru Thirimanne 140 (298); Taskin Ahmed 4/127 (34.2 overs)		251 (83 overs); Tamim Iqbal 92 (150); Praveen Jayawickrama 6/92 (32 overs)
194/9d (42.2 overs); Dimuth Karunaratne 66 (78); Taijul Islam 5/72 (19.2 overs)		227 (71 overs); Mushfiqur Rahim 40 (63); Praveen Jayawickrama 5/86 (32 overs)

Sri Lanka won by 209 runs
Pallekele International Cricket Stadium, Kandy
Umpires: Kumar Dharmasena (SL) and Ruchira Palliyaguruge (SL)
Player of the match: Praveen Jayawickrama (SL)

- Sri Lanka won the toss and elected to bat.
- 24.1 overs of play were lost on day 2 due to bad light.
- Praveen Jayawickrama (SL) and Shoriful Islam (Ban) both made their Test debuts.
- Dimuth Karunaratne became the 10th batsman for Sri Lanka to score 5,000 runs in Tests.
- Praveen Jayawickrama became the fifth bowler for Sri Lanka to take a five-wicket haul on debut in Tests.
- Praveen Jayawickrama also became the first bowler for Sri Lanka to take a ten-wicket haul on Test debut and take two five-wicket hauls on Test debut.
- World Test Championship points: Sri Lanka 60, Bangladesh 0.
