= Afghan cricket team in Sri Lanka in 2023 =

International cricket in 2023

	Sri Lanka	Afghanistan
- Dates: 2 – 7 June 2023
Captains	Dasun Shanaka	Hashmatullah Shahidi

One Day International series
- Results: Sri Lanka won the 3-match series 2–1
Most runs	Pathum Nissanka (132)	Ibrahim Zadran (174)
Most wickets	Wanindu Hasaranga (6); Dushmantha Chameera (6)	Fareed Ahmad (4)
- Player of the series: Dushmantha Chameera (SL)

The Afghanistan cricket team toured Sri Lanka in June 2023 to play three One Day International (ODI) matches. These matches formed part of Sri Lanka's preparation for 2023 Cricket World Cup Qualifier.

Afghanistan won the opening match by 6 wickets, before the hosts levelled the series by winning the 2nd match by 132 runs. Sri Lanka claimed the series with a comfortable nine-wicket victory in the 3rd ODI.

== Squads ==
Sri Lanka	Afghanistan
Dasun Shanaka (c); Kusal Mendis (vc, wk); Charith Asalanka; Dushmantha Chameera; Dhananjaya de Silva; Wanindu Hasaranga; Dushan Hemantha; Chamika Karunaratne; Dimuth Karunaratne; Lahiru Kumara; Angelo Mathews; Pathum Nissanka; Matheesha Pathirana; Kasun Rajitha; Sadeera Samarawickrama (wk); Maheesh Theekshana	Hashmatullah Shahidi (c); Rahmat Shah (vc); Fareed Ahmad; Noor Ahmad; Ikram Alikhil (wk); Fazalhaq Farooqi; Rahmanullah Gurbaz (wk); Riaz Hassan; Rashid Khan; Mohammad Nabi; Azmatullah Omarzai; Abdul Rahman; Mujeeb Ur Rahman; Ibrahim Zadran; Najibullah Zadran

Afghanistan also named Gulbadin Naib, Shahidullah, Yamin Ahmadzai and Zia-ur-Rehman as reserves. On 31 May 2023, Rashid Khan was ruled out of the first two ODIs due to a lower back injury.

== ODI series ==
=== 1st ODI ===
2 June 2023
10:00
Scorecard

Sri Lanka; 268 (50 overs)	v	Afghanistan; 269/4 (46.5 overs)
Charith Asalanka 91 (95); Fareed Ahmad 2/43 (8 overs)		Ibrahim Zadran 98 (98); Kasun Rajitha 2/49 (10 overs)

Afghanistan won by 6 wickets
Mahinda Rajapaksa International Cricket Stadium, Hambantota
Umpires: Nitin Menon (Ind) and Prageeth Rambukwella (SL)
Player of the match: Ibrahim Zadran (Afg)

- Afghanistan won the toss and elected to field.
- Dushan Hemantha and Matheesha Pathirana (SL) both made their ODI debuts.

=== 2nd ODI ===
4 June 2023
10:00
Scorecard

Sri Lanka; 323/6 (50 overs)	v	Afghanistan; 191 (42.1 overs)
Kusal Mendis 78 (75); Mohammad Nabi 2/52 (10 overs)		Hashmatullah Shahidi 57 (62); Dhananjaya de Silva 3/39 (10 overs)

Sri Lanka won by 132 runs
Mahinda Rajapaksa International Cricket Stadium, Hambantota
Umpires: Michael Gough (Eng) and Lyndon Hannibal (SL)
Player of the match: Dhananjaya de Silva (SL)

- Sri Lanka won the toss and elected to bat.

=== 3rd ODI ===
7 June 2023
10:00
Scorecard

Afghanistan; 116 (22.2 overs)	v	Sri Lanka; 120/1 (16 overs)
Mohammad Nabi 23 (23); Dushmantha Chameera 4/63 (9 overs)		Dimuth Karunaratne 56* (45); Gulbadin Naib 1/19 (2 overs)

Sri Lanka won by 9 wickets
Mahinda Rajapaksa International Cricket Stadium, Hambantota
Umpires: Nitin Menon (Ind) and Ruchira Palliyaguruge (SL)
Player of the match: Dushmantha Chameera (SL)

- Afghanistan won the toss and elected to bat.

== Statistics ==
=== Most runs ===
Rank	Runs	Player	Teams	Innings	Average	High Score	100	50
1	174	Ibrahim Zadran	(Afghanistan)	3	58.00	98	0	2
2	132	Pathum Nissanka	(Sri Lanka)	3	44.00	51	0	1
3	112	Dimuth Karunaratne	(Sri Lanka)	3	56.00	56*	0	2
4	100	Kusal Mendis	(Sri Lanka)	3	50.00	78	0	1
5	99	Hashmatullah Shahidi	(Afghanistan)	3	33.00	57	0	1
Last Updated: 1 June 2023
