= West Indian cricket team in Sri Lanka in 2024–25 =

International cricket tour

	Sri Lanka	West Indies
- Dates: 13 – 26 October 2024
Captains	Charith Asalanka	Shai Hope (ODIs); Rovman Powell (T20Is)

One Day International series
- Results: Sri Lanka won the 3-match series 2–1
Most runs	Charith Asalanka (145)	Sherfane Rutherford (204)
Most wickets	Wanindu Hasaranga (6)	Alzarri Joseph (4); Gudakesh Motie (4)
- Player of the series: Charith Asalanka (SL)

Twenty20 International series
- Results: Sri Lanka won the 3-match series 2–1
Most runs	Kusal Mendis (113)	Brandon King (91)
Most wickets	Wanindu Hasaranga (5); Maheesh Theekshana (5)	Romario Shepherd (4)
- Player of the series: Pathum Nissanka (SL)

The West Indies cricket team toured Sri Lanka in October 2024 to play the Sri Lanka cricket team. The tour consisted of three One Day International (ODI) and three Twenty20 International (T20I) matches. In November 2023, Sri Lanka Cricket (SLC) announced its international calendar for 2024 and confirmed the bilateral series.

West Indies won the first T20I by five wickets, with Brandon King and Evin Lewis, both scoring match winning half-centuries. The hosts won the second T20I by 73 runs, with Pathum Nissanka's 54 and Dunith Wellalage's 3/9. Sri Lanka won the third and final T20I by nine wickets, with Kusal Mendis and Kusal Perera, both scoring unbeaten half-centuries of 68 and 55 respectively, to secure their first ever T20I series victory over West Indies.

== Squads ==
Sri Lanka		West Indies	
ODIs	T20Is	ODIs	T20Is
Charith Asalanka (c); Asitha Fernando; Avishka Fernando; Wanindu Hasaranga; Janith Liyanage; Nishan Madushka; Dilshan Madushanka; Kamindu Mendis; Kusal Mendis (wk); Pathum Nissanka; Sadeera Samarawickrama (wk); Mohamed Shiraz; Maheesh Theekshana; Jeffrey Vandersay; Dunith Wellalage; Chamindu Wickramasinghe	Charith Asalanka (c); Dinesh Chandimal (wk); Asitha Fernando; Avishka Fernando; Binura Fernando; Wanindu Hasaranga; Kusal Mendis (wk); Kamindu Mendis; Pathum Nissanka; Kusal Perera (wk); Matheesha Pathirana; Bhanuka Rajapaksa; Maheesh Theekshana; Nuwan Thushara; Jeffrey Vandersay; Dunith Wellalage; Chamindu Wickramasinghe	Shai Hope (c, wk); Alzarri Joseph (vc); Jewel Andrew (wk); Alick Athanaze; Keacy Carty; Roston Chase; Matthew Forde; Shamar Joseph; Brandon King; Evin Lewis; Gudakesh Motie; Sherfane Rutherford; Jayden Seales; Romario Shepherd; Hayden Walsh Jr.	Rovman Powell (c); Roston Chase (vc); Fabian Allen; Alick Athanaze; Andre Fletcher (wk); Terrance Hinds; Shai Hope (wk); Alzarri Joseph; Shamar Joseph; Brandon King; Evin Lewis; Gudakesh Motie; Sherfane Rutherford; Romario Shepherd; Shamar Springer

Andre Russell, Nicholas Pooran, Shimron Hetmyer and Akeal Hosein withdrew from the series citing personal reasons. Seventeen-year-old Jewel Andrew was named in the ODI squad.

== T20I series ==
=== 1st T20I ===
13 October 2024
19:00 (N)
Scorecard

Sri Lanka; 179/7 (20 overs)	v	West Indies; 180/5 (19.1 overs)
Charith Asalanka 59 (35); Romario Shepherd 2/39 (4 overs)		Brandon King 63 (33); Matheesha Pathirana 2/27 (3.1 overs)

West Indies won by 5 wickets
Rangiri Dambulla International Stadium, Dambulla
Umpires: Ruchira Palliyaguruge (SL) and Raveendra Wimalasiri (SL)
Player of the match: Brandon King (WI)

- West Indies won the toss and elected to field.
- Shamar Springer (WI) made his T20I debut.

=== 2nd T20I ===
15 October 2024
19:00 (N)
Scorecard

Sri Lanka; 162/5 (20 overs)	v	West Indies; 89 (16.1 overs)
Pathum Nissanka 54 (49); Romario Shepherd 2/23 (3 overs)		Rovman Powell 20 (17); Dunith Wellalage 3/9 (4 overs)

Sri Lanka won by 73 runs
Rangiri Dambulla International Stadium, Dambulla
Umpires: Lyndon Hannibal (SL) and Raveendra Wimalasiri (SL)
Player of the match: Pathum Nissanka (SL)

- Sri Lanka won the toss and elected to bat.
- Dunith Wellalage (SL) made his T20I debut.

=== 3rd T20I ===
17 October 2024
19:00 (N)
Scorecard

West Indies; 162/8 (20 overs)	v	Sri Lanka; 166/1 (18 overs)
Rovman Powell 37 (27); Maheesh Theekshana 2/19 (3 overs)		Kusal Mendis 68* (50); Gudakesh Motie 1/31 (4 overs)

Sri Lanka won by 9 wickets
Rangiri Dambulla International Stadium, Dambulla
Umpires: Ruchira Palliyaguruge (SL) and Prageeth Rambukwella (SL)
Player of the match: Kusal Mendis (SL)

- West Indies won the toss and elected to bat.

== ODI series ==
=== 1st ODI ===
20 October 2024
14:30 (D/N)
Scorecard

West Indies; 185/4 (38.3 overs)	v	Sri Lanka; 234/5 (31.5 overs)
Sherfane Rutherford 74* (82); Wanindu Hasaranga 2/18 (6 overs)		Charith Asalanka 77 (71); Gudakesh Motie 3/47 (8 overs)

Sri Lanka won by 5 wickets (DLS method)
Pallekele International Cricket Stadium, Kandy
Umpires: Raveendra Wimalasiri (SL) and Asif Yaqoob (Pak)
Player of the match: Charith Asalanka (SL)

- West Indies won the toss and elected to bat.
- Sri Lanka were set a revised target of 232 runs from 37 overs due to rain.
- Nishan Madushka (SL) made his ODI debut.
- Charith Asalanka (SL) scored his 2,000th run in ODIs.

=== 2nd ODI ===
23 October 2024
14:30 (D/N)
Scorecard

West Indies; 189 (36 overs)	v	Sri Lanka; 190/5 (38.2 overs)
Sherfane Rutherford 80 (82); Wanindu Hasaranga 4/40 (8 overs)		Charith Asalanka 62* (61); Alzarri Joseph 2/30 (6 overs)

Sri Lanka won by 5 wickets
Pallekele International Cricket Stadium, Kandy
Umpires: Ruchira Palliyaguruge (SL) and Ahsan Raza (Pak)
Player of the match: Maheesh Theekshana (SL)

- Sri Lanka won the toss and elected to field.
- The match was reduced to 44 overs per side due to rain.
- The partnership between Sherfane Rutherford and Gudakesh Motie (119) was the highest 9th-wicket partnership for West Indies in ODIs.

=== 3rd ODI ===
26 October 2024
14:30 (D/N)
Scorecard

Sri Lanka; 156/3 (23 overs)	v	West Indies; 196/2 (22 overs)
Kusal Mendis 56* (22); Roston Chase 1/20 (2 overs)		Evin Lewis 102* (61); Asitha Fernando 1/39 (5 overs)

West Indies won by 8 wickets (DLS method)
Pallekele International Cricket Stadium, Kandy
Umpires: Prageeth Rambukwella (SL) and Asif Yaqoob (Pak)
Player of the match: Evin Lewis (WI)

- West Indies won the toss and elected to field.
- Rain interrupted play with Sri Lanka at 81/1 in 17.2 overs. The match was then reduced to 23 overs per side.
- West Indies were set a revised target of 195 runs from 23 overs.
- Jewel Andrew (WI) made his ODI debut.
- Kusal Mendis (SL) scored his 4,000th run in ODIs.

== Statistics ==
=== Most runs (T20I) ===
Rank	Runs	Player	Teams	Innings	Average	High Score	Strike Rate	50
1	113	Kusal Mendis	(Sri Lanka)	3	56.50	68*	124.17	1
2	104	Pathum Nissanka	(Sri Lanka)	3	34.66	54	128.39	1
3	91	Brandon King	(Cricket West Indies)	3	30.33	63	151.66	1
4	85	Kusal Perera	(Sri Lanka)	3	42.50	55*	154.54	1
5	70	Kamindu Mendis	(Sri Lanka)	3	35.00	51	129.62	1
Last Updated: 02 November 2024

=== Most wickets (T20I) ===
Rank	Wickets	Player	Teams	Innings	Best	Average	Economy	4W
1	5	Maheesh Theekshana	(Sri Lanka)	3	2/7	11.40	5.60	-
1	5	Wanindu Hasaranga	(Sri Lanka)	3	2/24	18.80	8.54	-
2	4	Matheesha Pathirana	(Sri Lanka)	3	2/27	13.50	7.53	-
2	4	Romario Shepherd	(Cricket West Indies)	3	2/23	21.50	8.60	-
3	3	Charith Asalanka	(Sri Lanka)	2	2/6	6.66	5.00	-
3	3	Dunith Wellalage	(Sri Lanka)	2	3/9	15.00	5.62	-
Last Updated: 02 November 2024

=== Most runs (ODI) ===
Rank	Runs	Player	Teams	Innings	Average	Strike Rate	High Score	100	50
1	204	Sherfane Rutherford	(Cricket West Indies)	3	204.00	107.36	80	-	3
2	145	Charith Asalanka	(Sri Lanka)	3	72.50	107.40	77	-	2
3	107	Nishan Madushka	(Sri Lanka)	2	53.50	109.18	69	-	1
4	103	Evin Lewis	(Cricket West Indies)	1	-	167.21	102*	1	-
5	101	Kusal Mendis	(Sri Lanka)	3	36.00	167.44	56*	-	1
Last Updated: 02 November 2024									

=== Most wickets (ODI) ===
Rank	Wickets	Player	Teams	Innings	Best	Average	Economy	5W
1	6	Wanindu Hasaranga	(Sri Lanka)	3	4/40	13.66	5.12	-
2	4	Gudakesh Motie	(Cricket West Indies)	3	3/47	21.50	3.90	-
2	4	Asitha Fernando	(Sri Lanka)	3	3/35	25.50	6.37	-
2	4	Alzarri Joseph	(Cricket West Indies)	3	2/30	27.50	6.47	-
3	3	Maheesh Theekshana	(Sri Lanka)	2	3/25	21.33	4.57	-
Last Updated: 02 November 2024
