= Shiran Fernando =

Sri Lankan cricketer (born 1993)

Personal information
- Born: 4 May 1993 (age 33); Colombo
- Batting: Right-handed
- Bowling: Right-arm medium-fast
- Role: Bowler
- Source: Cricinfo, 26 January 2022

Shiran Fernando (born 4 May 1993) is a Sri Lankan cricketer. He made his first-class debut for Lankan Cricket Club in the 2016–17 Premier League Tournament on 9 December 2016. In November 2019, he was named in Sri Lanka's squad for the 2019 ACC Emerging Teams Asia Cup in Bangladesh.

In May 2021, he was named in Sri Lanka's One Day International (ODI) squad for their series against Bangladesh. The following month, he was also named in Sri Lanka's squad for their tour of England. In July 2021, he was named in Sri Lanka's squad for their series against India. The following month, he was named in the SLC Blues team for the 2021 SLC Invitational T20 League tournament. In October 2021, he was added to Sri Lanka's squad for the 2021 ICC Men's T20 World Cup as a reserve player.

In January 2022, he was named in Sri Lanka's ODI squad for their series against Zimbabwe. Later the month, he was named in Sri Lanka's Twenty20 International (T20I) squad for their series against Australia. The following month, he was named in Sri Lanka's T20I squad for their series against India.
