= Chamika Gunasekara =

Sri Lankan cricketer

Personal information
- Full name: Chamika Deemantha Gunasekara
- Born: 25 November 1999 (age 26); Colombo, Sri Lanka
- Batting: Right-handed
- Bowling: Right-arm medium
- Role: Bowler

International information
- National side: Sri Lanka (2024-present)
- Only Test (cap 165): 2 February 2024 v Afghanistan
- Only ODI (cap 203): 16 January 2022 v Zimbabwe

Domestic team information
- Years: Team
- 2018-present: Nondescripts Cricket Club
- 2022: Jaffna Kings
- 2023: B-Love Kandy

Career statistics
| Competition | Test | ODI | FC | LA |
|---|---|---|---|---|
| Matches | 1 | 1 | 17 | 21 |
| Runs scored | 16 | – | 807 | 621 |
| Batting average | – | – | 26.90 | 25.87 |
| 100s/50s | 0/0 | – | 0/2 | 0/0 |
| Top score | 16* | – | 53 | 24* |
| Balls bowled | 54 | 6 | 1424 | 659 |
| Wickets | 0 | 0 | 30 | 24 |
| Bowling average | – | – | 15.07 | 14.50 |
| 5 wickets in innings | – | – | 1 | 1 |
| 10 wickets in match | – | – | 0 | 0 |
| Best bowling | – | – | 6/83 | 5/64 |
| Catches/stumpings | 0/– | 0/– | 11/– | 9/– |
- Source: ESPNcricinfo, 5 April 2024

Chamika Deemantha Gunasekara (born 25 November 1999) is a Sri Lankan professional cricketer who currently plays Test and ODI cricket for the national team. Chamika was educated at Ananda College, Colombo.

== Career ==
He made his List A debut on 17 December 2019, for Nondescripts Cricket Club in the 2019–20 Invitation Limited Over Tournament. He made his Twenty20 debut on 4 January 2020, for Nondescripts Cricket Club in the 2019–20 SLC Twenty20 Tournament. He made his first-class debut on 1 February 2020, for Nondescripts Cricket Club in the 2019–20 Premier League Tournament. In August 2021, he was named in the SLC Greys team for the 2021 SLC Invitational T20 League tournament. In November 2021, he was selected to play for the Jaffna Kings following the players' draft for the 2021 Lanka Premier League.

== International career ==
In November 2021, he was named in Sri Lanka's Test squad for their series against the West Indies. In January 2022, he was named in Sri Lanka's One Day International (ODI) squad for their series against Zimbabwe. He made his ODI debut on 16 January 2022, for Sri Lanka against Zimbabwe.

He made his international debut for the Sri Lanka cricket team in February 2024 against Afghanistan. During the match, he left the field with retire hurt after he was hit on the helmet by a bouncer by Naveed Zadran. He was ruled out from the game and Kasun Rajitha was approved as a concussion substitute.
