= Indian cricket team in Sri Lanka in 2021 =

International cricket tour

	Sri Lanka	India
- Dates: 18 – 29 July 2021
Captains	Dasun Shanaka	Shikhar Dhawan

One Day International series
- Results: India won the 3-match series 2–1
Most runs	Avishka Fernando (159)	Shikhar Dhawan (128)
Most wickets	Akila Dananjaya (3); Praveen Jayawickrama (3); Wanindu Hasaranga (3)	Yuzvendra Chahal (5)
- Player of the series: Suryakumar Yadav (Ind)

Twenty20 International series
- Results: Sri Lanka won the 3-match series 2–1
Most runs	Dhananjaya de Silva (72)	Shikhar Dhawan (136)
Most wickets	Wanindu Hasaranga (7)	Bhuvneshwar Kumar (5)
- Player of the series: Wanindu Hasaranga (SL)

The India cricket team toured Sri Lanka in July 2021 to play three One Day International (ODI) and three Twenty20 International (T20I) matches. The ODI series formed part of the inaugural 2020–2023 ICC Cricket World Cup Super League. All the matches took place at the R. Premadasa Stadium in Colombo. Originally, the tour was scheduled to take place in June 2020, but was moved back to August 2020 due to the COVID-19 pandemic, before being postponed. On 9 July 2021, following an outbreak of COVID-19 cases in the Sri Lankan camp, the series was postponed from 13 to 18 July.

The tour overlapped with India's participation in the 2021 ICC World Test Championship Final and a Test series against England. Therefore, the Board of Control for Cricket in India (BCCI) named Shikhar Dhawan and Bhuvneshwar Kumar as India's captain and vice-captain respectively for the matches against Sri Lanka. Sri Lanka Cricket (SLC) named Dasun Shanaka as the captain for tour, with their selectors releasing Kusal Perera from his captaincy role.

India won the first ODI by seven wickets, and then won the second ODI by three wickets, to take an unassailable lead in the series. Sri Lanka won the third ODI by three wickets, with India winning the series 2–1. India won the first T20I by 38 runs. The second T20I was postponed by one day, after India's Krunal Pandya tested positive for COVID-19. All eight of Pandya's close contacts tested negative for COVID-19, but were not allowed to travel to the ground for the final two matches. Sri Lanka won the second T20I by four wickets to level the series. Sri Lanka won the third T20I by seven wickets and won the series 2–1. It was the first time that Sri Lanka had won a T20I series against India. It was also Sri Lanka's first bilateral series win against India across all formats of international cricket since August 2008.

== Background ==
In May 2020, Sri Lanka Cricket sent an email to the BCCI requesting for the series to be played in July 2020 due to the COVID-19 pandemic. It also suggest the possibility of playing the matches behind closed doors. The BCCI responded saying they were open to travelling to Sri Lanka, as long as there is no compromise to the wellbeing of their cricketers. However, they also stated that the tour was "close to impossible at present", and they would have to wait to see how the pandemic unfolds. On 18 May 2020, Ashley de Silva, the CEO of Sri Lanka Cricket, confirmed that the tour had not yet been postponed. At the end of May, Sri Lanka Cricket named a 13-man squad to begin training at the Colombo Cricket Club. In June 2020, the BCCI agreed to tour Sri Lanka in August 2020, subject to government permission. On 12 June 2020, the BCCI confirmed that it had called off the tour due to the pandemic.

In May 2021, BCCI President Sourav Ganguly confirmed that India would tour Sri Lanka to play five T20Is, although later the BCCI wanted to reduce it to a three-match series. However, as the tour may ease the financial loses faced due to COVID-19 pandemic by boosting Sri Lanka Cricket's revenue, the board asked the BCCI to play five T20Is instead of three. On 20 May 2021, the BCCI considered the request, and agreed to play five T20Is. However, on 10 June 2021, Sri Lanka Cricket confirmed the tour itinerary with only three T20Is. On 8 June 2021, Rahul Dravid was named as the head coach of India's team for the tour.

== Squads ==
Sri Lanka	India
ODIs and T20Is	ODIs and T20Is
Dasun Shanaka (c); Dhananjaya de Silva (vc); Charith Asalanka; Ashen Bandara; Minod Bhanuka (wk); Dushmantha Chameera; Akila Dananjaya; Asitha Fernando; Avishka Fernando; Binura Fernando; Shiran Fernando; Wanindu Hasaranga; Ishan Jayaratne; Praveen Jayawickrama; Chamika Karunaratne; Lahiru Kumara; Dhananjaya Lakshan; Suminda Lakshan; Ramesh Mendis; Pathum Nissanka; Bhanuka Rajapaksa; Kasun Rajitha; Sadeera Samarawickrama; Lakshan Sandakan; Isuru Udana; Lahiru Udara	Shikhar Dhawan (c); Bhuvneshwar Kumar (vc); Yuzvendra Chahal; Deepak Chahar; Rahul Chahar; Varun Chakravarthy; Ruturaj Gaikwad; Krishnappa Gowtham; Ishan Kishan (wk); Ravisrinivasan Sai Kishore; Devdutt Padikkal; Manish Pandey; Hardik Pandya; Krunal Pandya; Ishan Porel; Nitish Rana; Navdeep Saini; Chetan Sakariya; Sanju Samson (wk); Prithvi Shaw; Arshdeep Singh; Simarjeet Singh; Sandeep Warrier; Kuldeep Yadav; Suryakumar Yadav

India did not name individual squads for the ODI and T20I matches, opting instead to name a combined squad of 20 players for the tour. Ishan Porel, Sandeep Warrier, Arshdeep Singh, Ravisrinivasan Sai Kishore, and Simarjeet Singh were also named as net bowlers. Prior to the second T20I match, all five net bowlers were added to India's squad, following the COVID-19 cases that resulted in the match being postponed. Krunal Pandya, Hardik Pandya, Suryakumar Yadav, Prithvi Shaw, Deepak Chahar, Krishnappa Gowtham, Ishan Kishan, and Yuzvendra Chahal were all placed into isolation and were ruled out of the final two matches of the tour.

Ahead of the series, Sri Lanka's Angelo Mathews requested not to take part in the tour for personal reasons. On 9 July 2021, Sri Lanka named a preliminary squad of 25 players for the tour. As per India, Sri Lanka also did not name individual squads for each format, naming a combined squad of 24 players for the tour. Suminda Lakshan was added to Sri Lanka's T20I squad as cover for Wanindu Hasaranga, who suffered an injury in the third ODI. Prior to the second T20I match, Sadeera Samarawickrama was added to Sri Lanka's squad.

== ODI series ==
=== 1st ODI ===
18 July 2021
15:00 (D/N)
Scorecard

Sri Lanka; 262/9 (50 overs)	v	India; 263/3 (36.4 overs)
Chamika Karunaratne 73* (85); Deepak Chahar 2/37 (7 overs)		Shikhar Dhawan 86* (95); Dhananjaya de Silva 2/49 (5 overs)

India won by 7 wickets
R. Premadasa Stadium, Colombo
Umpires: Kumar Dharmasena (SL) and Raveendra Wimalasiri (SL)
Player of the match: Prithvi Shaw (Ind)

- Sri Lanka won the toss and elected to bat.
- Bhanuka Rajapaksa (SL), Ishan Kishan and Suryakumar Yadav (Ind) all made their ODI debuts.
- Dasun Shanaka captained Sri Lanka for the first time in ODIs.
- Shikhar Dhawan captained India for the first time in ODIs, and scored his 6,000th run in the format.
- World Cup Super League points: India 10, Sri Lanka 0.

=== 2nd ODI ===
20 July 2021
15:00 (D/N)
Scorecard

Sri Lanka; 275/9 (50 overs)	v	India; 277/7 (49.1 overs)
Charith Asalanka 115 (128); Yuzvendra Chahal 3/50 (10 overs)		Deepak Chahar 69* (82); Wanindu Hasaranga 3/37 (10 overs)

India won by 3 wickets
R. Premadasa Stadium, Colombo
Umpires: Kumar Dharmasena (SL) and Lyndon Hannibal (SL)
Player of the match: Deepak Chahar (Ind)

- Sri Lanka won the toss and elected to bat.
- World Cup Super League points: India 10, Sri Lanka –1. (Note: Sri Lanka were deducted one World Cup Super League point for bowling a slow over-rate.)

=== 3rd ODI ===
23 July 2021
15:00 (D/N)
Scorecard

India; 225 (43.1/47 overs)	v	Sri Lanka; 227/7 (39/47 overs)
Prithvi Shaw 49 (49); Akila Dananjaya 3/44 (10 overs)		Avishka Fernando 76 (98); Rahul Chahar 3/54 (10 overs)

Sri Lanka won by 3 wickets (DLS method)
R. Premadasa Stadium, Colombo
Umpires: Kumar Dharmasena (SL) and Ruchira Palliyaguruge (SL)
Player of the match: Avishka Fernando (SL)

- India won the toss and elected to bat.
- Sri Lanka were set a revised target of 227 runs from 47 overs due to rain.
- Rahul Chahar, Krishnappa Gowtham, Nitish Rana, Chetan Sakariya and Sanju Samson (Ind) all made their ODI debuts.
- World Cup Super League points: Sri Lanka 10, India 0.

== T20I series ==
=== 1st T20I ===
25 July 2021
20:00 (N)
Scorecard

India; 164/5 (20 overs)	v	Sri Lanka; 126 (18.3 overs)
Suryakumar Yadav 50 (34); Dushmantha Chameera 2/24 (4 overs)		Charith Asalanka 44 (26); Bhuvneshwar Kumar 4/22 (3.3 overs)

India won by 38 runs
R. Premadasa Stadium, Colombo
Umpires: Kumar Dharmasena (SL) and Raveendra Wimalasiri (SL)
Player of the match: Bhuvneshwar Kumar (Ind)

- Sri Lanka won the toss and elected to field.
- Charith Asalanka, Chamika Karunaratne (SL), Varun Chakravarthy and Prithvi Shaw (Ind) all made their T20I debuts.
- Shikhar Dhawan captained India for the first time in T20Is.

=== 2nd T20I ===
28 July 2021
20:00 (N)
Scorecard

India; 132/5 (20 overs)	v	Sri Lanka; 133/6 (19.4 overs)
Shikhar Dhawan 40 (42); Akila Dananjaya 2/29 (4 overs)		Dhananjaya de Silva 40* (34); Kuldeep Yadav 2/30 (4 overs)

Sri Lanka won by 4 wickets
R. Premadasa Stadium, Colombo
Umpires: Ruchira Palliyaguruge (SL) and Prageeth Rambukwella (SL)
Player of the match: Dhananjaya de Silva (SL)

- Sri Lanka won the toss and elected to field.
- Ramesh Mendis (SL), Ruturaj Gaikwad, Devdutt Padikkal, Nitish Rana and Chetan Sakariya (Ind) all made their T20I debuts.

=== 3rd T20I ===
29 July 2021
20:00 (N)
Scorecard

India; 81/8 (20 overs)	v	Sri Lanka; 82/3 (14.3 overs)
Kuldeep Yadav 23* (28); Wanindu Hasaranga 4/9 (4 overs)		Dhananjaya de Silva 23* (20); Rahul Chahar 3/15 (4 overs)

Sri Lanka won by 7 wickets
R. Premadasa Stadium, Colombo
Umpires: Kumar Dharmasena (SL) and Ruchira Palliyaguruge (SL)
Player of the match: Wanindu Hasaranga (SL)

- India won the toss and elected to bat.
- Sandeep Warrier (Ind) made his T20I debut.
- Shikhar Dhawan (Ind) played in his last T20I.

== Statistics ==
=== Most runs (ODI) ===
Rank	Runs	Player	Teams	Innings	Average	High Score	100	50
1	159	Avishka Fernando	(Sri Lanka)	3	53.00	76	0	2
2	128	Shikhar Dhawan	(India)	3	64.00	86*	0	1
3	127	Charith Asalanka	(Sri Lanka)	3	42.33	65	0	1
4	124	Suryakumar Yadav	(India)	3	62.00	53	0	1
5	105	Prithvi Shaw	(India)	3	35.00	49	0	0
Last Updated: 1 August 2021

=== Most wickets (ODI) ===
Rank	Wickets	Player	Teams	Innings	Best	Average	Economy
1	5	Yuzvendra Chahal	(India)	2	3/50	20.40	5.10
2	4	Deepak Chahar	(India)	2	2/37	22.50	6.00
3	3	Akila Dhananjaya	(Sri Lanka)	1	3/44	14.66	4.40
3	3	Rahul Chahar	(India)	1	3/54	18.00	5.40
3	3	Praveen Jayawickrama	(Sri Lanka)	1	3/59	19.66	5.90
3	3	Wanindu Hasaranga	(Sri Lanka)	2	3/37	27.33	4.31
3	3	Bhuvneshwar Kumar	(India)	2	3/54	39.00	6.15
Last Updated: 1 August 2021

=== Most runs (T20I) ===
Rank	Runs	Player	Teams	Innings	Average	High Score	Strike Rate	50
1	86	Shikhar Dhawan	(India)	3	28.66	46	108.86	0
2	72	Dhananjaya de Silva	(Sri Lanka)	3	72.00	40*	112.50	0
3	64	Minod Bhanuka	(Sri Lanka)	3	21.33	36	98.46	0
4	50	Suryakumar Yadav	(India)	1	50.00	50	147.05	1
5	49	Avishka Fernando	(Sri Lanka)	3	16.33	26	90.74	0
Last Updated: 1 August 2021

=== Most wickets (T20I) ===
Rank	Wickets	Player	Teams	Innings	Best	Average	Economy
1	7	Wanindu Hasaranga	(Sri Lanka)	3	4/9	9.57	5.58
2	5	Bhuvneshwar Kumar	(India)	3	4/22	10.40	5.47
3	4	Rahul Chahar	(India)	2	3/15	10.50	5.25
3	4	Dushmantha Chameera	(Sri Lanka)	3	2/24	15.75	5.25
5	3	Dasun Shanaka	(Sri Lanka)	3	2/20	12.66	5.42
Last Updated: 1 August 2021
