= Sri Lankan cricket team in Australia in 2021–22 =

International cricket tour

	Australia	Sri Lanka
- Dates: 11 – 20 February 2022
Captains	Aaron Finch	Dasun Shanaka

Twenty20 International series
- Results: Australia won the 5-match series 4–1
Most runs	Josh Inglis (155)	Pathum Nissanka (184)
Most wickets	Josh Hazlewood (8); Kane Richardson (8)	Dushmantha Chameera (7)
- Player of the series: Glenn Maxwell (Aus)

The Sri Lanka cricket team toured Australia in February 2022 to play five Twenty20 International (T20I) matches. In May 2021, Cricket Australia confirmed the fixtures for the tour. In January 2022, Cricket Australia updated the tour schedule, to reduce the risks of COVID-19 by minimising travel across the country.

Australia won the opening match by 20 runs, after a rain delay reduced Sri Lanka's innings to 19 overs. In January 2022, the International Cricket Council made changes to the T20I playing conditions, including an in-match penalty for a slow over rate. If the team who is fielding does not start to bowl their final over in the allocated time, they will only be allowed to have four fielders outside the inner circle, and not five. In the second T20I match of the series, Sri Lanka became the first team to incur the new penalty, after not bowling their overs in time. The match ended in a tie, with Australia winning the Super Over. Australia won the third T20I by six wickets, winning the series with two matches to play. Australia also won the fourth match by six wickets, taking a 4–0 lead in the series. Sri Lanka won the final T20I match by five wickets with Australia winning the series 4–1.

== Squads ==
T20Is
Australia	Sri Lanka
Aaron Finch (c); Ashton Agar; Pat Cummins; Josh Hazlewood; Travis Head; Moises Henriques; Josh Inglis; Ben McDermott; Glenn Maxwell; Jhye Richardson; Kane Richardson; Daniel Sams; Steven Smith; Mitchell Starc; Marcus Stoinis; Matthew Wade; Adam Zampa	Dasun Shanaka (c); Charith Asalanka (vc); Dushmantha Chameera; Dinesh Chandimal; Avishka Fernando; Binura Fernando; Shiran Fernando; Danushka Gunathilaka; Wanindu Hasaranga; Praveen Jayawickrama; Chamika Karunaratne; Lahiru Kumara; Janith Liyanage; Kamil Mishara; Kusal Mendis; Ramesh Mendis; Pathum Nissanka; Maheesh Theekshana; Nuwan Thushara; Jeffrey Vandersay

Ahead of the tour, Australia added Daniel Sams to their T20I squad, replacing Travis Head. Head played in the 2021–22 Sheffield Shield season, before he joined the team for the final T20Is in Melbourne. On 8 February 2022, Sri Lanka's Kusal Mendis tested positive for COVID-19, ruling him out of the first two matches of the series. In the second T20I match, Australia's Steven Smith suffered a concussion and was ruled out of the rest of the series. Prior to the third T20I, Sri Lanka's Wanindu Hasaranga also tested positive for COVID-19, and was ruled out of the fixture.

== T20I series ==
=== 1st T20I ===
11 February 2022
19:10 (N)
Scorecard

Australia; 9/149 (20 overs)	v	Sri Lanka; 8/122 (19 overs)
Ben McDermott 53 (41); Wanindu Hasaranga 3/38 (4 overs)		Pathum Nissanka 36 (37); Josh Hazlewood 4/12 (4 overs)

Australia won by 20 runs (DLS method)
Sydney Cricket Ground, Sydney
Umpires: Shawn Craig (Aus) and Sam Nogajski (Aus)
Player of the match: Adam Zampa (Aus)

- Sri Lanka won the toss and elected to field.
- Sri Lanka were set a revised target of 143 runs from 19 overs due to rain.
- Josh Inglis (Aus) made his T20I debut.

=== 2nd T20I ===
13 February 2022
19:10 (N)
Scorecard

Australia; 6/164 (20 overs)	v	Sri Lanka; 8/164 (20 overs)
Josh Inglis 48 (32); Dushmantha Chameera 2/30 (4 overs)		Pathum Nissanka 73 (53); Josh Hazlewood 3/22 (4 overs)

Match tied
(Australia won the Super Over)
Sydney Cricket Ground, Sydney
Umpires: Donovan Koch (Aus) and Rod Tucker (Aus)
Player of the match: Josh Hazlewood (Aus)

- Sri Lanka won the toss and elected to field.
- Nuwan Thushara (SL) made his T20I debut.

=== 3rd T20I ===
15 February 2022
19:10 (N)
Scorecard

Sri Lanka; 6/121 (20 overs)	v	Australia; 4/124 (16.5 overs)
Dasun Shanaka 39* (38); Kane Richardson 3/21 (4 overs)		Glenn Maxwell 39 (26); Maheesh Theekshana 3/24 (4 overs)

Australia won by 6 wickets
Manuka Oval, Canberra
Umpires: Shawn Craig (Aus) and Rod Tucker (Aus)
Player of the match: Kane Richardson (Aus)

- Australia won the toss and elected to field.

=== 4th T20I ===
18 February 2022
19:10 (N)
Scorecard

Sri Lanka; 8/139 (20 overs)	v	Australia; 4/143 (18.1 overs)
Pathum Nissanka 46 (40); Jhye Richardson 2/20 (4 overs)		Glenn Maxwell 48* (39); Lahiru Kumara 2/22 (4 overs)

Australia won by 6 wickets
Melbourne Cricket Ground, Melbourne
Umpires: Sam Nogajski (Aus) and Rod Tucker (Aus)
Player of the match: Glenn Maxwell (Aus)

- Australia won the toss and elected to field.

=== 5th T20I ===
20 February 2022
17:10 (D/N)
Scorecard

Australia; 6/154 (20 overs)	v	Sri Lanka; 5/155 (19.5 overs)
Matthew Wade 43* (27); Dushmantha Chameera 2/30 (4 overs)		Kusal Mendis 69* (58); Kane Richardson 2/28 (3.4 overs)

Sri Lanka won by 5 wickets
Melbourne Cricket Ground, Melbourne
Umpires: Donovan Koch (Aus) and Sam Nogajski (Aus)
Player of the match: Kusal Mendis (SL)

- Australia won the toss and elected to bat.
- Janith Liyanage and Kamil Mishara (SL) both made their T20I debuts.

== Statistics ==
=== Most runs ===
Rank	Runs	Player	Teams	Innings	Average	High Score	Strike Rate	50
1	184	Pathum Nissanka	(Sri Lanka)	5	36.80	73	115.72	1
2	155	Josh Inglis	(Australia)	5	38.75	48	143.51	-
3	138	Glen Maxwell	(Australia)	5	34.50	48*	133.98	-
4	116	Dasun Shanaka	(Sri Lanka)	5	29.00	39*	110.47	-
5	100	Kusal Mendis	(Sri Lanka)	3	50.00	69*	111.11	1
Last Updated: 1 August 2022

=== Most wickets ===
Rank	Wickets	Player	Teams	Innings	Best	Average	Economy
1	8	Josh Hazlewood	(Australia)	3	4/12	8.12	5.41
1	8	Kane Richardson	(Australia)	4	3/21	17.12	8.74
3	7	Dushmantha Chameera	(Sri Lanka)	5	2/30	21.85	7.65
4	5	Wanindu Hasaranga	(Sri Lanka)	2	3/38	14.20	8.87
4	5	Mahesh Theekshana	(Sri Lanka)	5	3/24	25.80	6.78
4	5	Adam Zampa	(Australia)	4	3/18	20.60	6.43
Last Updated: 1 August 2022

Australian cricket team in Sri Lanka in 2022
