= Ramesh Mendis =

Sri Lankan cricketer (born 1995)

Personal information
- Full name: Wanigamuni Ramesh Tarinda Mendis
- Born: 7 July 1995 (age 31); Ambalangoda, Sri Lanka
- Height: 5 ft 8 in (1.73 m)
- Batting: Right handed
- Bowling: Right arm offbreak
- Role: All-rounder

International information
- National side: Sri Lanka (2021-present)
- Test debut (cap 154): 22 January 2021 v England
- Last Test: 6 February 2025 v Australia
- ODI debut (cap 197): 28 May 2021 v Bangladesh
- Last ODI: 21 January 2022 v Zimbabwe
- T20I debut (cap 89): 28 July 2021 v India
- Last T20I: 30 July 2024 v India

Domestic team information
- Years: Team
- 2020: Dambulla Viiking
- 2021: Dambulla Giants

Career statistics
Competition	Test	ODI	T20I	FC
Matches	16	4	4	99
Runs scored	408	50	17	5,076
Batting average	17.73	25.00	5.66	40.60
100s/50s	0/0	0/0	0/0	12/24
Top score	45*	26	12	300*
Balls bowled	4,173	72	42	16,130
Wickets	71	4	2	301
Bowling average	31.15	18.50	24.00	29.69
5 wickets in innings	5	0	0	12
10 wickets in match	1	0	0	1
Best bowling	6/70	2/26	1/13	7/80
Catches/stumpings	6/–	1/–	1/–	57/–
- Source: Cricinfo, 23 March 2025

Wanigamuni Ramesh Tarinda Mendis (born 7 July 1995) is a professional Sri Lankan cricketer who plays for the Sri Lanka cricket team in all three formats of the game. He was part of Sri Lanka's squad for the 2014 ICC Under-19 Cricket World Cup. He made his international debut for the Sri Lanka cricket team in January 2021.

== Domestic career ==
In March 2018, he was named in Kandy's squad for the 2017–18 Super Four Provincial Tournament. The following month, he was also named in Kandy's squad for the 2018 Super Provincial One Day Tournament. In August 2018, he was named in Dambulla's squad the 2018 SLC T20 League.

He was the leading run-scorer for Moors Sports Club in the 2018–19 Premier League Tournament, with 612 runs in nine matches. He was also the leading wicket-taker for the team in the tournament, with 30 dismissals in nine matches.

In March 2019, he was named in Dambulla's squad for the 2019 Super Provincial One Day Tournament. In November 2019, he was named in Sri Lanka's squad for the 2019 ACC Emerging Teams Asia Cup in Bangladesh. In January 2020, on the opening day of the 2019–20 Premier League Tournament, Mendis scored his maiden double century in first-class cricket, making 205 runs for Moors Sports Club. He went on to convert it into his maiden triple century, finishing with 300 not out. In October 2020, he was drafted by the Dambulla Viiking for the inaugural edition of the Lanka Premier League.

In August 2021, he was named in the SLC Greens team for the 2021 SLC Invitational T20 League tournament. In November 2021, he was selected to play for the Dambulla Giants following the players' draft for the 2021 Lanka Premier League. In July 2022, he was signed by the Dambulla Giants for the third edition of the Lanka Premier League.

== International career ==
In January 2021, he was named as a reserve player for Sri Lanka's Test matches against England. He made his Test debut for Sri Lanka, against England, on 22 January 2021. In February 2021, Mendis was named in Sri Lanka's limited overs squad for their series against the West Indies.

During the second Test against Bangladesh in 2021, Mendis claimed bowling figures of 2/86 and 4/103. He helped the debutant Praveen Jayawickrama to take wickets from the other end where Bangladesh lost the match by 202 runs. Finally Sri Lanka won the series 1–0.

In May 2021, he was named in Sri Lanka's One Day International (ODI) squad for their series against Bangladesh. He made his ODI debut for Sri Lanka on 28 May 2021, against Bangladesh, taking two wickets.

In July 2021, he was named in Sri Lanka's squad for their series against India. He made his Twenty20 International (T20I) debut on 28 July 2021, for Sri Lanka against India. On 1 October 2021, he was added to Sri Lanka's squad for the 2021 ICC Men's T20 World Cup. In December 2021, in the second match against the West Indies, Mendis took his first five-wicket haul in Test cricket.
