= Pathum Nissanka =

Sri Lankan cricketer (born 1998)

Personal information
- Full name: Pathum Nissanka Silva
- Born: 18 May 1998 (age 28); Galle, Sri Lanka
- Batting: Right-handed
- Role: Top-order batter

International information
- National side: Sri Lanka (2021–present)
- Test debut (cap 155): 21 March 2021 v West Indies
- Last Test: 25 June 2025 v Bangladesh
- ODI debut (cap 194): 10 March 2021 v West Indies
- Last ODI: 27 January 2026 v England
- ODI shirt no.: 18
- T20I debut (cap 86): 3 March 2021 v West Indies
- Last T20I: 16 February 2026 v Australia
- T20I shirt no.: 18

Domestic team information
- Years: Team
- 2017–2018: Badureliya
- 2019–present: Nondescripts Cricket Club
- 2021; 2023: Colombo Strikers
- 2022: Kandy Falcons
- 2023: Rangpur Riders
- 2023: Bangla Tigers
- 2024–present: Jaffna Kings
- 2025/26–present: Gulf Giants
- 2026: Delhi Capitals

Career statistics
Competition	Test	ODI	T20I	FC
Matches	18	78	91	58
Runs scored	1,305	2,999	2,648	5,262
Batting average	45.00	41.08	31.15	57.19
100s/50s	4/7	7/19	2/19	19/21
Top score	187	210*	107	217
Catches/stumpings	12/–	24/–	21/–	35/–
Medal record
Men's cricket
Representing Sri Lanka
Asia Cup
Winner	2022 UAE
Runner-up	2023 Pakistan
South Asian Games
Silver medal – second place	2019 Nepal
- Source: ESPNcricinfo, 29 June 2025

Pathum Nissanka Silva (Sinhala: පැතුම් නිස්සංක සිල්වා, [pætum nissaŋkə silʋa]; born 18 May 1998) is a professional Sri Lankan cricketer who plays all formats of the game. He made his international debut for the Sri Lanka cricket team in March 2021 and is currently the permanent opening batsman and plays in all three formats of the game. On 9 February 2024, Nissanka scored an ODI double hundred, becoming the first Sri Lankan to achieve the feat.

== Early life and domestic career ==
Pathum Nissanka was born on 18 May 1998 in Galle. His father Sunil Silva worked as a ground boy and his income was low. Pathum's mother sold flowers near the Kalutara temple. In early childhood, he was raised in a poor family background. He started his cricket career during his time at Kalutara Vidyalaya and then move to Isipathana College, Colombo. When in the School Cricket Championship he scored an unbeaten double century (205) off 190 balls against President's College, Rajagiriya at Colts ground, Colombo. He made his List A debut for Hambantota District in the 2016–17 Districts One Day Tournament on 17 March 2017. He made his Twenty20 debut for Badureliya Sports Club in the 2017–18 SLC Twenty20 Tournament on 24 February 2018.

In March 2018, he was named in Kandy's squad for the 2017–18 Super Four Provincial Tournament. The following month, he was also named in Kandy's squad for the 2018 Super Provincial One Day Tournament.

In March 2019, he was named in Kandy's squad for the 2019 Super Provincial One Day Tournament. In August 2021, he was named in the SLC Greens team for the 2021 SLC Invitational T20 League tournament. In November 2021, he was selected to play for the Colombo Stars following the players' draft for the 2021 Lanka Premier League. In July 2022, he was signed by the Kandy Falcons to play in the 2022 Lanka Premier League tournament.

On 17, December 2023 at Major Clubs Limited over tournament 2022/2023, against SSC, Nissanka scored his 5th List A century. He scored 135 runs from 96 deliveries hitting 13 boundaries and 6 sixes while chasing down 263 from 35 overs. His efforts went in vain as NCC lost the match by 14 runs.

=== International League T20 (ILT20) ===
Nissanka made his ILT20 debut for the Gulf Giants in the 2025–26 season, having been signed as a replacement for Ramon Simmonds.

=== Indian Premier League (IPL) ===
Nissanka secured his maiden IPL contract in the 2026 IPL auction, being acquired by the Delhi Capitals for a final bid of ₹4 crore (equivalent to ₹4.1 crore or US$440,000 in 2026) against a base price of ₹75 lakh (equivalent to ₹77 lakh or US$83,000 in 2026).

== International career ==
=== Early days ===
In January 2019, he was named in Sri Lanka A's squad for the first-class series against Ireland A. He was the leading run-scorer for Sri Lanka A with 258 runs in two matches. In February 2019, he scored his 1,000th run in the 2018–19 Premier League Tournament, batting for Nondescripts Cricket Club against Colombo Cricket Club. He finished the tournament as the leading run-scorer for Nondescripts Cricket Club, with 1,088 runs in seven matches.

In November 2019, he was named in Sri Lanka's squad for the 2019 ACC Emerging Teams Asia Cup in Bangladesh. Later the same month, he was named in Sri Lanka's squad for the men's cricket tournament at the 2019 South Asian Games. The Sri Lanka team won the silver medal after they lost to Bangladesh by seven wickets in the final.

In February 2021, Nissanka was named in Sri Lanka's limited overs squad for their series against the West Indies. He made his Twenty20 International (T20I) debut for Sri Lanka on 3 March 2021, against the West Indies. Three days later, Nissanka was named in Sri Lanka's Test squad, also for their series against the West Indies. He made his One Day International (ODI) debut for Sri Lanka on 10 March 2021, against the West Indies. He made his Test debut for Sri Lanka on 21 March 2021, against the West Indies. In the second innings of the match, he scored 103 runs to become the fourth batsman for Sri Lanka to score a century on debut in Test cricket. It was also the first century to be scored by a Sri Lankan batsman away from home on debut.

On 1 October 2021, he was added to Sri Lanka's squad for the 2021 ICC Men's T20 World Cup. During the World Cup, Nissanka scored 221 runs in eight matches, including three half centuries. On 16 January 2022, against Zimbabwe Nissanka scored his maiden ODI half century. He scored 146 runs in three matches, including two half-centuries. Due to his performance, Nissanka was named the Player of the Series. Even though Sri Lanka lost the T20I series 4-1 against Australia in February 2022, Nissaka broke the record for runs scored by a Sri Lankan batsman in a T20I match series against Australia, scoring 184 runs in the 5 matches.

=== Rising through the ranks ===
In June 2022, in the third match against Australia, Nissanka scored his first century in an ODI match, with 137 runs, as Sri Lanka beat Australia by six wickets. During the Test series against Australia, Nissanka contracted COVID-19 and was ruled out of the series. During the T20I series against Australia, he reached 598 T20I runs, and broke the record for most runs in the first 20 T20I innings for Sri Lanka, previously held by Kumar Sangakkara with 576 runs. In the meantime, he surpassed Tillakaratne Dilshan's record for the most 30+ scores for Sri Lanka in the first 20 T20I innings by reaching eleven 30+ scores.

During the 2022 Asia Cup, Nissanka played as the opener with Kusal Mendis and they made match-winning partnerships in the games against Bangladesh, Afghanistan and India. Meanwhile, Nissanka made half-centuries against India and Pakistan in the Super 4 stage. Chasing 174 against India, Nissanka and Mendis made 97 runs within 11 overs and set up the chase. Even though Nissaka got out early in the final against Pakistan, Sri Lanka finally won the tournament for the sixth time.

First round in T20I World Cup 2022, against UAE, Nissanka scored his 8th T20I half-century. He scored 74 runs in 60 balls to out Sri Lanka's descendant total of 152 runs. Due to excellent bowling performance from Sri Lanka they won the match by 79 runs and Nissanka won player of the match award for his performance. On 5 November 2022, against England, Nissanka scored 9th T20I half-century. He scored 67 runs from 45 deliveries hitting two boundaries and five sixes. Despite his knock Sri Lanka lost the match by 4 wickets. On 7 June 2023, against Afghanistan, Nissanka scored 7th ODI half-century. He scored 51 runs from 34 balls. Finally, Sri Lanka won the match. He is the second highest run-scorer in the series 132 in 3 innings with an average of 44.

=== Showcase in Qualifiers 2023 ===
On 19 June 2023, qualifier match against UAE, Nissanka scored his 8th ODI half-century where he scored 57 runs from 76 deliveries hitting five boundaries. He also put on a 95-run partnership with Dimuth Karunaratne and Sri Lanka won the match by 175 runs. On 27 June 2023, qualifier match against Scotland, Nissanka scored his 9th ODI half century and reached 1000 ODI runs. Finally, Sri Lanka won the match by 82 runs. On 2 July 2023, qualifier match against Zimbabwe, Nissanka scored his 2nd ODI century. While chasing down the target, he scored an unbeaten 101 runs from 102 balls hitting 14 boundaries. Finally, Sri Lanka won the match by 9 wickets. On 7 July 2023, qualifier match against West Indies, Nissanka scored his second consecutive and third ODI century. While chasing down the target of 243, he scored 104 runs from 113 deliveries and made 190-run partnership for the first wicket with Dimuth Karunaratne. Finally, Sri Lanka won the match by 8 wickets.

Nissanka was the second-highest run-scorer in the World Cup qualifier, scoring 417 runs with an average of 69.50 including two centuries and two half-centuries. Due to his performance, he was included in Wisden's Cricket World Cup Qualifier 2023 Team of the Tournament. Nissanka selected to cricket world cup squad.

=== Ups and Downs ===
During the match against Pakistan in the 2023 Cricket World Cup, he scored his 10th ODI half-century. He also put 102 run partnership with Kusal Mendis but ended up in the losing team. On 16 October 2023, against Australia, he scored his 11th ODI half-century and put 125 run partnership with Kusal Perera for first wicket. However Sri Lanka lost the match after a batting collapse. On 21 October 2023, against Netherland, Nissanka scored his 12th ODI half-century, his third consecutive half-century in the World Cup. Finally, Sri Lanka won their first match in the World Cup by 5 wickets.

On 26 October 2023 against England, Nissanka made his 13th ODI half-century, his fourth consecutive half-century in the World Cup, where he became the fifth Sri Lankan batter to score 50 or more runs in three consecutive World Cup matches, with Kumar Sangakkara, Chamara Silva, Roshan Mahanama and Arjuna Ranatunga. Nissanka also became the second batter and first Sri Lankan to get to 1000 ODI runs in 2023. He made match winning unbeaten 137 run partnership with Sadeera Samarawickrama and England made their sixth consecutive World Cup loss to Sri Lanka. He is second highest run scorer for Sri Lanka scoring 332 runs in 9 matches with average of 41.5.

=== Consistent at the top ===
On 9 February 2024, during the first ODI match against Afghanistan, Nissanka became the first Sri Lankan to score an ODI double hundred, surpassing the previous highest score of 189 by Sanath Jayasuriya in 2000. The score also equaled fifth highest individual score in ODI history and he became only the tenth batsman in the world to score a double hundred in an ODI. It is also the third fastest double century in men's ODIs just behind Ishan Kishan and Glenn Maxwell in terms of number of balls faced, as he reached the milestone in 136 balls. His unbeaten knock of 210 is also the highest individual ODI score in Sri Lankan soil surpassing the previous record of 169 held by Sangakkara. The 128 runs scored in boundaries, is the most for a Sri Lankan batter in ODIs. He scored 8 sixes during the innings which is also the highest number of sixes scored by a Sri Lankan batter in an ODI played in Sri Lankan soil. Nissanka also became first Sri Lankan male cricketer to score a double century in List A cricket.

On 14 February 2024 in the third ODI against Afghanistan, he scored his 5th ODI century and became the fastest Sri Lankan to score 2000 ODI runs with 52 innings, which is 11 innings better than Upul Tharanga. Eventually Sri Lanka won the match by 7 wickets and Nissanka won player of the match and player of the series awards for his performance throughout the series. He is the highest run-scorer in a three-match series for Sri Lanka and fourth overall with 346 runs with and average of 173. During third T20I match against Afghanistan, Nissanka scored his 10th T20I half century and first against Afghanistan. On 15 March 2024, in the second ODI match against Bangladesh, Nissanka scored his 6th ODI century and put 185 run partnership for fourth wicket with Charith Asalanka. Finally, Sri Lanka won the match by 3 wickets and he won player of the match award for his performance. In May 2024, he was named in Sri Lanka’s squad for the 2024 ICC Men's T20 World Cup tournament. On 2 August 2024, in the first ODI against India, he scored 56 runs from 75 deliveries hitting nine boundaries, but the match ended as a tie.

In 2024, Nissanka was selected to play second test match against England after two years since he played test match. In the first innings in the third test, he scored his 6th Test half-century match. In the second innings, he made a match-winning unbeaten century where he scored 127 runs from 124 runs. Sri Lanka chased the target of 219 runs comfortably and won the match by 8 wickets, where he won the player of the match award for his performance. The win gave Sri Lanka's first test victory against England in 10 years. On 15 October 2024, in the second T20I match against West Indies he scored his 12th T20I half-century, where Sri Lanka won the match by 73 runs and Nissanka won the player of the match award. On 28 December 2024, in the first T20I match against New Zealand, he scored his 14th T20I half century in a losing cause.

Due to his performance in ODI format, Nissanka is included in the ICC Men's ODI Team of the Year 2024 where he scored 694 Runs in 12 matches with an average 63.1 and strike rate of 106.4 including 3 centuries and two half-centuries. During first test match against Bangladesh, Nissanka made his third test century which is his first test hundred in Sri Lanka. He scored 187 runs from 256 balls, but the match ended up in a draw. In the second test match against Bangladesh, he scored his fourth test century and guided Sri Lanka to win by an innings and 78 runs. Due to his performance, he won player of the match and player of the series awards. On 31 August 2025, second ODI match against Zimbabwe Nissanka scored his 7th ODI century and Sri lanka won the match comfortably. Due to his performances, he won both Player of the Match and Player of the Series awards.

On 13 September 2025, in the fifth match of the Asia Cup 2025 against Bangladesh, Nissanka scored 50 runs off 34 balls and became the third and fastest Sri Lankan to reach 2,000 T20I runs. He continued his good form in the second match against Hong Kong and scored 68 off 44 balls where Sri Lanka finally won the match, and he adjudged the player of the match award as well. On 26 September 2025, Nissanka scored his maiden T20I century against India, achieving the rare feat of scoring a century in Test cricket, a double century in an ODI match, and a century in T20 cricket. He became the fourth Sri Lankan to score a T20I century after Mahela Jayawardene, Tillakaratne Dilshan and Kusal Perera. His score of 107 is the highest individual T20I score by a Sri Lankan surpassed Dilshan's unbeaten 104. Despite his performance, the match was tied and India won in the Super Over.

On 16 February 2026, Nissanka scored his 2nd T20I century against Australia in a group stage match during the 2026 T20 World Cup. He hit an unbeaten 100* off just 52 deliveries, as Sri Lanka successfully chased down 182 against Australia in 18 overs, also making it their highest successful T20I chase at home. With this innings, Nissanka became the 1st Sri Lankan batter with multiple T20I hundreds.

On June 3, 2026, first ODI match against West Indies Pathum scored 19th ODI half century. He scored 79 runs and Nissanka played a generally smart inning, running between wickets and hitting particularly well towards the line of the square behind the legside. Eventuality Sri Lanka won the match by 41 runs. This is the first ODI win in West Indies since 2013.

== International centuries ==
=== Key ===
- * – Remained not out
- † – Man of the match

=== Test Centuries ===
No.	Score	Against	Pos.	Inn.	Test	Venue	H/A/N	Date	Result	Ref
1	103	West Indies	6	3	1/2	Sir Vivian Richards Stadium, North Sound	Away	21 March 2021	Drawn	
2	127* †	England	1	4	3/3	The Oval, London	Away	6 September 2024	Won	
3	187	Bangladesh	1	2	1/2	Galle International Stadium, Galle	Home	17 June 2025	Drawn	
4	158 †	Bangladesh	1	2	2/2	SSC Cricket Ground, Colombo	Home	25 June 2025	Won	

=== ODI centuries ===
No.	Score	Against	Pos.	Inn.	SR	Venue	H/A/N	Date	Result	Ref
1	137 †	Australia	2	2	93.19	R. Premadasa Stadium, Colombo	Home	19 June 2022	Won	
2	101*	Zimbabwe	1	2	99.01	Queens Sports Club, Bulawayo	Away	2 July 2023	Won	
3	104	West Indies	1	2	92.03	Harare Sports Club, Harare	Neutral	7 July 2023	Won	
4	210* †	Afghanistan	1	1	151.07	Pallekele International Cricket Stadium, Kandy	Home	9 February 2024	Won	
5	118 †	Afghanistan	1	2	116.83	Pallekele International Cricket Stadium, Kandy	Home	14 February 2024	Won	
6	114 †	Bangladesh	1	2	100.88	Zahur Ahmed Chowdhury Stadium, Chittagong	Away	15 March 2024	Won	
7	122 †	Zimbabwe	1	2	89.71	Harare Sports Club, Harare	Away	31 August 2025	Won	

=== T20I centuries ===
No.	Runs	Against	Pos.	Inn.	SR	Venue	H/A/N	Date	Result	Ref
1	107 †	India	1	2	184.48	Dubai International Stadium, Dubai	Neutral	26 September 2025	Lost	
2	100* †	Australia	1	2	192.31	Pallekele International Cricket Stadium, Kandy	Home	16 February 2026	Won	

== Awards ==
- ICC Men's ODI Team of the Year: 2024
- Sri Lanka Cricket Best Men's ODI Batter of the Year: 2024
- Sri Lanka Cricket Best Men's Test Batter of the Year: 2025
- Sri Lanka Cricket Best Men's T20I Batter of the Year: 2025
- Sri Lanka Cricket Best Men's Cricketer of the Year: 2025
