= Praveen Jayawickrama =

Sri Lankan cricketer

Personal information
- Full name: Perumapperuma Arachchige Kaveesha Praveen Jayawickrama
- Born: 30 September 1998 (age 28); Kalutara, Sri Lanka
- Batting: Right-handed
- Bowling: Slow left arm orthodox
- Role: Bowler

International information
- National side: Sri Lanka (2021–2022)
- Test debut (cap 156): 29 April 2021 v Bangladesh
- Last Test: 23 May 2022 v Bangladesh
- ODI debut (cap 199): 29 June 2021 v England
- Last ODI: 7 September 2021 v South Africa
- T20I debut (cap 91): 12 September 2021 v South Africa
- Last T20I: 11 June 2022 v Australia

Career statistics
Competition	Test	ODI	T20I	FC
Matches	5	5	5	33
Runs scored	12	7	0	354
Batting average	12.00	7.00	–	14.16
100s/50s	0/0	0/0	0/0	0/0
Top score	8*	4*	0*	46
Balls bowled	1,320	198	79	5,427
Wickets	25	5	2	120
Bowling average	25.68	35.40	75.00	27.06
5 wickets in innings	2	0	0	6
10 wickets in match	1	0	0	2
Best bowling	6/92	3/59	1/29	6/91
Catches/stumpings	2/–	0/–	0/–	22/–
- Source: Cricinfo, 29 March 2024

Perumapperuma Arachchige Kaveesha Praveen Jayawickrama (born 30 September 1998), normally known as Praveen Jayawickrama, is a professional Sri Lankan cricketer who plays for the national team in all three formats. He made his international debut for the Sri Lanka cricket team in April 2021. He had his education in St. Sebastian's College, Moratuwa. and Holy Cross College, Kalutara.

In August 2024, he was charged with three counts of breaching the International Cricket Council's (ICC) Anti-Corruption Code for Participants. On 2 October 2024, the ICC banned Jayawickrama from all forms of cricket for one year, with six months of the ban suspended, after he admitted to breaching the code.

== Domestic career ==
He made his first-class debut for Colts Cricket Club in the 2018–19 Premier League Tournament on 11 January 2019. Prior to his first-class debut, he was named in Sri Lanka's squad for the 2018 Under-19 Cricket World Cup. He made his List A debut on 15 December 2019, for Moors Sports Club in the 2019–20 Invitation Limited Over Tournament. He made his Twenty20 debut on 4 January 2020, for Moors Sports Club in the 2019–20 SLC Twenty20 Tournament.

In August 2021, he was named in the SLC Blues team for the 2021 SLC Invitational T20 League tournament. In July 2022, he was signed by the Jaffna Kings for the third edition of the Lanka Premier League.

== International career ==
In April 2021, Jayawickrama was named in Sri Lanka's Test squad for their series against Bangladesh. He made his Test debut on 29 April 2021, for Sri Lanka against Bangladesh. On his debut, he took six wickets for 92 runs in the first innings, to become the fifth bowler for Sri Lanka to take a five-wicket haul on debut in a Test match. He also took five wickets for 86 runs in the second innings, becoming the first bowler for Sri Lanka, and 16th overall, to take a ten-wicket haul on debut in a Test match. It was the best bowling performance by a left-arm spinner on debut in Test cricket, and the first bowler to take a 10-wicket haul on debut since Jason Krejza in 2008.

In June 2021, Jayawickrama was named in Sri Lanka's squad for their series against England. He made his One Day International (ODI) debut on 29 June 2021, for Sri Lanka against England. In July 2021, he was named in Sri Lanka's squad for their series against India. In August 2021, he was named in Sri Lanka's Twenty20 International (T20I) squad for their series against South Africa.

In September 2021, Jayawickrama was named in Sri Lanka's squad for the 2021 ICC Men's T20 World Cup. He made his T20I debut on 12 September 2021, for Sri Lanka against South Africa.
