= 2025 Hong Kong Sixes =

Six-a-side cricket tournament in Hong Kong

- Dates: 7 – 9 November 2025
- Administrator: Cricket Hong Kong, China
- Cricket format: Six-a-side; 6 overs Match
- Tournament format(s): Round-robin and Knockouts
- Host: Hong Kong
- Champions: Pakistan (6th title)
- Runners-up: Kuwait
- Participants: 12
- Matches: 30
- Player of the series: (Pakistan) Abbas Afridi
- Most runs: (Nepal) Sundeep Jora (176)
- Most wickets: (Nepal) Rashid Khan (9)
- Official website: Official website

The 2025 Hong Kong Sixes was the 21st edition of the Hong Kong Cricket Sixes that took place at the Mission Road Ground in Mong Kok, Hong Kong. The tournament consisted of 12 nations and was played across three days from 7 to 9 November 2025.

== Background ==
The Hong Kong Cricket Sixes is a six-a-side international cricket tournament held at the Kowloon Cricket Club. It is organised by the Cricket Hong Kong and sanctioned by the International Cricket Council. The first edition was played in 1992 and was last played in 2024. The tournament returned in 2024 after a 7-year hiatus and the number of teams was increased to 12 from 8 in previous editions. Sri Lanka were the defending champions, having defeated Pakistan in the previous cup final.

=== Rules and regulations ===
All standard laws of the game as laid down by the MCC applied with the following significant differences:

- Games are played between two teams of six players.
- Games consist of six overs of six balls.
- Each member of the fielding side, except for the wicket-keeper, shall bowl one over with only one member bowling two overs non consecutively.
- Wides and no-balls count as the usual extra run to the batting side, plus an extra ball, with no free hit for no-balls.
- A batter must retire 'not out' on reaching a personal score of 50 runs but may not retire before reaching 50 runs. If one of the last pair of batters is out, any retired 'not out' batter may resume his innings.
- If five wickets fall before 6 overs are completed, the last remaining batter shall bat on with the 5th out batter acting as a runner. The last remaining batter must always be the striker, and shall be declared out if his partner gets out (run out or obstructing the field). The innings shall be completed at the fall of the sixth wicket.

=== Format ===
The tournament featured 12 teams divided into four pools, each containing three teams. After the round-robin stage, the top two teams from each group competed in the Cup finals round, while all third-placed teams participated in the Bowl League finals.

Cup Finals: The top two teams from each group will play in the quarter-final round of the Cup finals, with the winners advancing to the semifinals. The losing teams of the four quarter-finals competed in the Plate semi-finals.

Plate Finals: The losing teams of the four quarter-finals will play in the Plate semi-finals. The winners of these semi-finals advanced to the Plate finals.

Bowl League Finals: All four third-placed teams will compete in the Bowl League in a round-robin format, with the top two teams qualifying for the Bowl final.

== Teams and squads ==
Pool A			Pool B		
Afghanistan	Nepal	South Africa	Australia	England	United Arab Emirates
Gulbadin Naib (c); Noor ul Rahman (wk); Karim Janat; Sharafuddin Ashraf; Farmanullah; Ijaz Ahmad Ahmadzai; Sediqullah Pacha	Sharad Veswakar (c); Sundeep Jora; Lokesh Bam (wk); Rupesh Kumar Singh; Mohammad Adil Alam; Rashid Khan; Basir Ahamad	Jordan Morris (c); Abdullah Bayoumy (wk); Ethan Cunningham; Mbulelo Dube; Kashief Joseph; Blake Simpson; Jorich van Schalkwyk	Alex Ross (c); Ben McDermott (wk); Jack Wood; Nick Hobson; Chris Green; Will Bosisto; Andrew Tye	Joe Denly (c); James Coles; Ethan Brookes; Toby Albert; George Hill; Dan Mousley; Tom Aspinwall	Harshit Kaushik (c); Khalid Shah (wk); Mohammad Arfan; Muhammad Farooq; Saghir Khan; Nilansh Keswani; Rejith Arjunan; Zahid Ali
Pool C			Pool D		
India	Kuwait	Pakistan	Bangladesh	Hong Kong	Sri Lanka
Dinesh Karthik (c) (wk); ~~Ravichandran Ashwin~~; Stuart Binny; Bharat Chipli; Abhimanyu Mithun; Shahbaz Nadeem; Priyank Panchal; Robin Uthappa	Yasin Patel (c); Meet Bhavsar (wk); Usman Gani (wk); Ravija Sandaruwan; Mohamed Shafeeq; Bilal Tahir; Adnan Idrees	Abbas Afridi (c); Abdul Samad; Khawaja Mohammad Nafay (wk); Maaz Sadaqat; Muhammad Shahzad; Saad Masood; Shahid Aziz	Akbar Ali (c) (wk); Abu Hider; Habibur Rahman Sohan; Rakibul Hasan; Tofail Ahmed Rayhan; Mosaddek Hossain; Jishan Alam	Yasim Murtaza (c); Babar Hayat; Anshuman Rath (wk); Aizaz Khan; Nizakat Khan; Ehsan Khan; Nasrulla Rana	Lahiru Madushanka (c); Dhananjaya Lakshan; Thanuka Dabare; Nimesh Vimukthi; Lahiru Samarakoon; Tharindu Rathnayake; Sachitha Jayathilake; Movin Subasingha (Stand-by)

cricket.com

== Group stage ==
Pool A	Pool B	Pool C	Pool D
Afghanistan; Nepal; South Africa	Australia; England; United Arab Emirates	India; Kuwait; Pakistan	Bangladesh; Hong Kong; Sri Lanka

=== Pool A ===
Pos	Team	Pld	W	L	NR	Pts	NRR	Qualification
1	Afghanistan	2	2	0	0	4	5.500	Advanced to Quarter-finals
2	South Africa	2	1	1	0	2	−4.822	Advanced to Quarter-finals
3	Nepal	2	0	2	0	0	−2.102	Advanced to Bowl finals

Source: ESPNcricinfo

==== Fixtures ====
7 November 2025
11:00
Scorecard

Afghanistan; 112/5 (6 overs)	v	Nepal; 95/2 (6 overs)
Karim Janat 35 (10); Rashid Khan 4/27 (2 overs)		Sundeep Jora 53* (14); Ijaz Ahmad Ahmadzai 1/16 (1 over)

Afghanistan won by 17 runs
Mission Road Ground, Mong Kok
Umpires: Tabarak Dar (HK) and John Prakash (HK)
Player of the match: Farmanullah (AFG)

- Afghanistan won the toss and elected to bat.

7 November 2025
13:45
Scorecard

Afghanistan; 148/2 (6 overs)	v	South Africa; 99/2 (6 overs)
Gulbadin Naib 50* (12); Abdullah Bayoumy 2/35 (2 overs)		Jorich Van Schalkwyk 37 (9)

Afghanistan won by 49 runs
Mission Road Ground, Mong Kok
Umpires: Tabarak Dar (HK) and Shelton J D'Cruz (HK)
Player of the match: Gulbadin Naib (AFG)

- Afghanistan won the toss and elected to bat.

8 November 2025
08:15
Scorecard

Nepal; 58 (3.3 overs)	v	South Africa; 64/2 (3.4 Overs)
Rashid Khan 16 (4); Jorich Van Schalkwyk 2/6 (0.3 overs)		Blake Simpson 30* (9); Lokesh Bam 2/31 (1.4 overs)

South Africa won by 4 wickets
Mission Road Ground, Mong Kok
Umpires: John Prakash (HK) and Niaz Ali (HK)

- South Africa won the toss and elected to field.

=== Pool B ===
Pos	Team	Pld	W	L	NR	Pts	NRR	Qualification
1	Australia	2	1	0	1	3	14.833	Advanced to Quarter-finals
2	England	2	0	0	2	2	0.000	Advanced to Quarter-finals
3	United Arab Emirates	2	0	1	1	1	−14.833	Advanced to Bowl finals

Source: ESPNcricinfo

==== Fixtures ====
7 November 2025
09:10
Scorecard

United Arab Emirates	v	England

No result
Mission Road Ground, Mong Kok
Umpires: Niaz Ali (HK) and John Prakash (HK)

- England won the toss and elected to field.
- No play was possible due to rain.
- Match abandoned with a toss.

7 November 2025
12:50
Scorecard

United Arab Emirates; 87/3 (6 overs)	v	Australia; 88/0 (3 overs)
Mohammad Arfan 28 (14); Chris Green 2/19 (1 over)		Jack Wood 55* (11)

Australia won by 6 wickets
Mission Road Ground, Mong Kok
Umpires: John Prakash (HK) and Ramasamy Venkatesh (HK)
Player of the match: Jack Wood (AUS)

- Australia won the toss and elected to field.

7 November 2025
16:30
Scorecard

Australia	v	England

No result
Mission Road Ground, Mong Kok
Umpires: John Prakash (HK) and Hemant Tukrul (HK)

- Australia won the toss and elected to bat.
- No play was possible due to rain.
- Match abandoned with a toss.

=== Pool C ===
Pos	Team	Pld	W	L	NR	Pts	NRR	Qualification
1	Kuwait	2	1	1	0	2	1.683	Advanced to Quarter-finals
2	Pakistan	2	1	1	0	2	−0.111	Advanced to Quarter-finals
3	India	2	1	1	0	2	−2.256	Advanced to Bowl finals

Source: ESPNcricinfo

==== Fixtures ====
7 November 2025
10:05
Scorecard

Kuwait; 123/2 (6 overs)	v	Pakistan; 124/1 (6 overs)
Meet Bhavsar 41* (14); Maaz Sadaqat 1/13 (1 over)		Abbas Afridi 55* (12); Mohamed Shafeeq 1/8 (1 over)

Pakistan won by 4 wickets
Mission Road Ground, Mong Kok
Umpires: Shelton J D'Cruz (HK) and Ramasamy Venkatesh (HK)
Player of the match: Abbas Afridi (PAK)

- Pakistan won the toss and elected to field.

7 November 2025
15:35
Scorecard

India; 86/4 (6 overs)	v	Pakistan; 41/1 (3 overs)
Robin Uthappa 28 (11); Muhammad Shahzad 2/15 (1 over)		Abdul Samad 18* (9); Stuart Binny 1/7 (1 over)

India won by 2 runs (DLS method)
Mission Road Ground, Mong Kok
Umpires: Tabarak Dar (HK) and Ramasamy Venkatesh (HK)
Player of the match: Robin Uthappa (IND)

- Pakistan won the toss and elected to field.

8 November 2025
09:10
Scorecard

Kuwait; 106/5 (6 overs)	v	India; 79 (5.4 overs)
Yasin Patel 58* (14); Abhimanyu Mithun 2/21 (2 overs)		Abhimanyu Mithun 26 (9); Yasin Patel 3/23 (2 overs)

Kuwait won by 27 runs
Mission Road Ground, Mong Kok
Umpires: Tabarak Dar (HK) and Shelton J D'Cruz (HK)
Player of the match: Yasin Patel (KUW)

- India won the toss and elected to field.

=== Pool D ===
Pos	Team	Pld	W	L	NR	Pts	NRR	Qualification
1	Hong Kong	2	1	0	1	3	8.651	Advanced to Quarter-finals
2	Bangladesh	2	1	0	1	3	0.694	Advanced to Quarter-finals
3	Sri Lanka	2	0	2	0	0	−3.497	Advanced to Bowl finals

Source: ESPNcricinfo

==== Fixtures ====
7 November 2025
08:15
Scorecard

Bangladesh	v	Hong Kong

Match abandoned
Mission Road Ground, Mong Kok
Umpires: Tabarak Dar (HK) and Ramasamy Venkatesh (HK)

- No toss.
- No play was possible due to rain.

7 November 2025
11:55
Scorecard

Sri Lanka; 79/5 (6 overs)	v	Hong Kong; 80/2 (3.4 overs)
Thanuka Dabare 26 (10); Nasrulla Rana 2/4 (1 over)		Aizaz Khan 44* (10); Dhananjaya Lakshan 2/17 (1 over)

Hong Kong won by 4 wickets
Mission Road Ground, Mong Kok
Umpires: Niaz Ali (HK) and Shelton J D'Cruz (HK)
Player of the match: Aizaz Khan (HK)

- Hong Kong won the toss and elected to field.

7 November 2025
14:40
Scorecard

Bangladesh; 75/5 (6 overs)	v	Sri Lanka; 61 (5.1 overs)
Akbar Ali 32 (9); Tharindu Rathnayake 1/12 (1 over)		Dhananjaya Lakshan 18 (12); Mosaddek Hossain 3/20 (2 overs)

Bangladesh won by 14 runs
Mission Road Ground, Mong Kok
Umpires: Niaz Ali (HK) and Hemant Tukrul (HK)
Player of the match: Mosaddek Hossain (BAN)

- Sri Lanka won the toss and elected to field.

== Quarter-finals ==
=== Quarter-final 1 ===
8 November 2025
11:55
Scorecard

Australia; 149/2 (6 overs)	v	Bangladesh; 95/5 (6 overs)
Ben McDermott 51* (14); Rakibul Hasan 1/24 (1 over)		Abu Hider 50* (18); Chris Green 3/32 (2 overs)

Australia won by 54 runs
Mission Road Ground, Mong Kok
Umpires: Niaz Ali (HK) and Shelton J D'Cruz (HK)
Player of the match: Alex Ross (AUS)

- Bangladesh won the toss and elected to field.

=== Quarter-final 2 ===
8 November 2025
12:50
Scorecard

South Africa; 102/3 (6 overs)	v	Pakistan; 105/1 (3.5 overs)
Jorich Van Schalkwyk 40 (13); Muhammad Shahzad 3/11 (1 over)		Abdul Samad 50* (10); Ethan-John Cunningham 1/23 (1 over)

Pakistan won by 5 wickets
Mission Road Ground, Mong Kok
Umpires: Tabarak Dar (HK) and Ramasamy Venkatesh (HK)
Player of the match: Muhammad Shahzad (PAK)

- Pakistan won the toss and elected to field.

=== Quarter-final 3 ===
8 November 2025
15:35
Scorecard

England; 122/4 (6 overs)	v	Hong Kong; 81 (5.2 overs)
Ethan Brookes 50* (11); Nasrulla Rana 2/13 (1 over)		Yasim Murtaza 26 (10); Ethan Brookes 2/6 (1 over)

England won by 41 runs
Mission Road Ground, Mong Kok
Umpires: Shelton J D'Cruz (HK) and John Prakash (HK)
Player of the match: Ethan Brookes (ENG)

- Hong Kong won the toss and elected to field.

=== Quarter-final 4 ===
8 November 2025
16:30
Scorecard

Afghanistan; 87 (5.2 overs)	v	Kuwait; 90/2 (5.1 overs)
Karim Janat 57 (19); Bilal Tahir 3/9 (1 over)		Bilal Tahir 36* (11); Gulbadin Naib 2/32 (2 overs)

Kuwait won by 4 wickets
Mission Road Ground, Mong Kok
Umpires: Tabarak Dar (HK) and Ramasamy Venkatesh (HK)
Player of the match: Bilal Tahir (KUW)

- Kuwait won the toss and elected to field.

== Bowl finals ==
=== Bowl League ===
==== Points table ====
Pos	Team	Pld	W	L	NR	Pts	NRR	Qualification
1	Sri Lanka	3	3	0	0	6	4.174	Advanced to Bowl Final
2	United Arab Emirates	3	2	1	0	4	1.284	Advanced to Bowl Final
3	Nepal	3	1	2	0	2	−0.971	
4	India	3	0	3	0	0	−8.291	

Updated to match(es) played on 9 November 2025. Source: Cricbuzz

==== Fixtures ====
8 November 2025
10:05
Scorecard

Nepal; 86/4 (6 overs)	v	Sri Lanka; 89/3 (5.3 overs)
Sundeep Jora 39 (10); Tharindu Ratnayake 2/17 (1 overs)		Dhananjaya Lakshan 36* (10); Rupesh Singh 2/17 (1.3 overs)

Sri Lanka won by 3 wickets
Mission Road Ground, Mong Kok
Umpires: Niaz Ali (HK) and Ramasamy Venkatesh (HK)
Player of the match: Dhananjaya Lakshan (SL)

- Nepal won the toss and elected to bat.

8 November 2025
11:00
Scorecard

India; 107/3 (6 overs)	v	United Arab Emirates; 111/2 (5.5 overs)
Abhimanyu Mithun 50* (16); Nilansh Keswani 2/11 (2 overs)		Khalid Shah 50* (14); Bharat Chipli 1/17 (0.5 overs)

United Arab Emirates won by 4 wickets
Mission Road Ground, Mong Kok
Umpires: John Prakash (HK) and Hemant Tukrul (HK)
Player of the match: Nilansh Keswani (UAE)

- United Arab Emirates won the toss and elected to field.

8 November 2025
13:45
Scorecard

Nepal; 137/0 (6 overs)	v	India; 45 (3 overs)
Rashid Khan 55* (17)		Priyank Panchal 12 (3); Rashid Khan 3/7 (1 over)

Nepal won by 92 runs
Mission Road Ground, Mong Kok
Umpires: John Prakash (HK) and Hemant Tukrul (HK)
Player of the match: Rashid Khan (NEP)

- Nepal won the toss and elected to bat.

8 November 2025
14:40
Scorecard

Sri Lanka; 97/5 (6 overs)	v	United Arab Emirates; 58 (5.2 overs)
Dhananjaya Lakshan 38* (12); Zahid Ali 2/29 (2 overs)		Saghir Khan 24 (11); Lahiru Madushanka 2/10 (1 over)

Sri Lanka won by 39 runs
Mission Road Ground, Mong Kok
Umpires: Tabarak Dar (HK) and Ramasamy Venkatesh (HK)

- United Arab Emirates won the toss and elected to field.

9 November 2025
08:15
Scorecard

United Arab Emirates; 129 (6 overs)	v	Nepal; 86/4 (6 overs)
Nilansh Keswani 50 (10); Rashid Khan 2/36 (2 overs)		Mohammad Aadil Alam 32 (12); Muhammad Farooq 2/15 (1 over)

United Arab Emirates won by 43 runs
Mission Road Ground, Mong Kok
Umpires: Shelton J D'Cruz (HK) and Hemant Tukrul (HK)

- Nepal won the toss and elected to field.

9 November 2025
11:00
Scorecard

Sri Lanka; 138/0 (6 overs)	v	India; 90/3 (6 overs)
Lahiru Samarakoon 52* (14)		Bharat Chipli 41 (13); Lahiru Samarakoon 2/20 (2 overs)

Sri Lanka won by 48 runs
Mission Road Ground, Mong Kok
Umpires: Shelton J D'Cruz (HK) and Niaz Ali (HK)
Player of the match: Lahiru Samarakoon (SL)

- India won the toss and elected to field.

=== Bowl Final ===
9 November 2025
13:45
Scorecard

Sri Lanka; 106/2 (6 overs)	v	United Arab Emirates; 85/2 (6 overs)
Sachitha Jayathilake 52* (13); Saghir Khan 1/18 (1 over)		Nilansh Keswani 44 (19); Nimesh Vimukthi 1/6 (1 over)

Sri Lanka won by 21 runs
Mission Road Ground, Mong Kok
Umpires: Hemant Tukrul (HK) and Tabarak Dar (HK)
Player of the match: Sachitha Jayathilake (SL)

- United Arab Emirates won the toss and elected to field.

== Plate finals ==
=== Plate Semi-finals ===
9 November 2025
09:10
Scorecard

Bangladesh; 128/3 (6 overs)	v	South Africa; 103 (6 overs)
Habibur Rahman Sohan 54* (13); Jordan Morris 2/25 (2 overs)		Abdullah Bayoumy 38 (10); Abu Hider 2/25 (2 overs)

Bangladesh won by 25 runs
Mission Road Ground, Mong Kok
Umpires: John Prakash (HK) and Niaz Ali (HK)

- South Africa won the toss and elected to field.

9 November 2025
10:05
Scorecard

Afghanistan; 95/5 (6 overs)	v	Hong Kong; 96/1 (5.4 overs)
Karim Janat 34 (14); Ehsan Khan 3/27 (2 overs)		Anshy Rath 45* (17); Gulbadin Naib 1/14 (1 over)

Hong Kong won by 5 wickets
Mission Road Ground, Mong Kok
Umpires: Ramasamy Venkatesh (HK) and Tabarak Dar (HK)
Player of the match: Ehsan Khan (HK)

- Afghanistan won the toss and elected to bat.

=== Plate Final ===
9 November 2025
14:40
Scorecard

Bangladesh; 120/5 (6 overs)	v	Hong Kong; 123/5 (6 overs)
Akbar Ali 51 (13); Nasrulla Rana 2/19 (1 over)		Aizaz Khan 85* (21); Abu Hider 4/22 (2 overs)

Hong Kong won by 1 wicket
Mission Road Ground, Mong Kok
Umpires: John Prakash (HK) and Niaz Ali (HK)
Player of the match: Aizaz Khan (HK)

- Hong Kong won the toss and elected to field.

== Cup finals ==
=== Semi-finals ===
==== Semi-final 1 ====
9 November 2025
11:55
Scorecard

Pakistan; 121/2 (6 overs)	v	Australia; 120/5 (6 overs)
Khawaja Nafay 50* (14); Alex Ross 2/12 (1 over)		Chris Green 46 (12); Abbas Afridi 1/7 (1 over)

Pakistan won by 1 run
Mission Road Ground, Mong Kok
Umpires: John Prakash (HK) and Tabarak Dar (HK)
Player of the match: Khawaja Nafay (PAK)

- Australia won the toss and elected to field.

==== Semi-final 2 ====
9 November 2025
12:50
Scorecard

Kuwait; 142/5 (6 overs)	v	England; 105/3 (6 overs)
Meet Bhavsar 62 (15); Ethan Brookes 3/29 (2 overs)		James Coles 55 (18); Bilal Tahir 1/12 (1 over)

Kuwait won by 37 runs
Mission Road Ground, Mong Kok
Umpires: Ramasamy Venkatesh (HK) and Shelton J D'Cruz (HK)
Player of the match: Meet Bhavsar (KUW)

- England won the toss and elected to field.

=== Final ===
9 November 2025
15:35
Scorecard

Pakistan; 135/3 (6 overs)	v	Kuwait; 92 (5.1 oves)
Abbas Afridi 52* (11); Meet Bhavsar 3/29 (2 overs)		Meet Bhavsar 33 (12); Maaz Sadaqat 3/29 (2 overs)

Pakistan won by 43 runs
Mission Road Ground, Mong Kok
Umpires: Ramasamy Venkatesh (HK) and Tabarak Dar (HK)
Player of the match: Abbas Afridi (PAK)

- Kuwait won the toss and elected to field.

== Final standings ==
Position	Team	Result
1st	Pakistan	Champions
2nd	Kuwait	Runners-up
Semi-finalists	Australia	
Semi-finalists	England	
5th	Hong Kong	Plate winners
6th	Bangladesh	Plate runners-up
Plate semi-finalists	Afghanistan	
Plate semi-finalists	South Africa	
9th	Sri Lanka	Bowl winners
10th	United Arab Emirates	Bowl runners-up
11th	Nepal	
12th	India	
