= 2024 Hong Kong Sixes =

Six-a-side cricket tournament in Hong Kong

2024 Hong Kong Cricket Sixes
- Dates: 1 – 3 November 2024
- Administrator: Cricket Hong Kong, China
- Cricket format: Six-a-side; 6 overs Match
- Tournament format(s): Round-robin and Knockouts
- Host: Hong Kong
- Champions: Sri Lanka (2nd title)
- Runners-up: Pakistan
- Participants: 12
- Matches: 30
- Player of the series: (Sri Lanka) Tharindu Rathnayake
- Most runs: (Oman) Vinayak Shukla (275)
- Most wickets: (Sri Lanka) Tharindu Rathnayake (8)
- Official website: Official website

The 2024 Hong Kong Cricket Sixes was the 20th edition of the Hong Kong Cricket Sixes that took place at the Mission Road Ground in Mong Kok, Hong Kong. The tournament consisted of 12 nations that competed across three days from 1 to 3 November 2024. This marked a return of the tournament after a 7-year hiatus.

Sri Lanka won the tournament after defeating Pakistan in the final.

== Background ==
The Hong Kong Cricket Sixes is a six-a-side international cricket tournament held at the Kowloon Cricket Club. It is organised by the Cricket Hong Kong and sanctioned by the International Cricket Council. The first edition was played in 1992 and was last played in 2017. The tournament returned in 2024 after a 7-year hiatus and the number of competitors was increased to 12 from 8 in previous editions. South Africa are the defending champions, having defeated Pakistan in the previous cup final.

=== Rules and regulations ===
All standard laws of the game as laid down by the MCC applied with the following significant differences:

- Games are played between two teams of six players.
- Games consist of six overs of six balls.
- Each member of the fielding side, except for the wicket-keeper, shall bowl one over with only one member bowling two overs non consecutively.
- Wides and no-balls count as the usual extra run to the batting side, plus an extra ball, with no free hit for no-balls.
- A batter must retire 'not out' on reaching a personal score of 50 runs but may not retire before reaching 50 runs. If one of the last pair of batters is out, any retired 'not out' batter may resume his innings.
- If five wickets fall before 6 overs are completed, the last remaining batter shall bat on with the 5th out batter acting as a runner. The last remaining batter must always be the striker, and shall be declared out if his partner gets out (run out or obstructing the field). The innings shall be completed at the fall of the sixth wicket.

=== Format ===
The tournament featured 12 teams divided into four pools, each containing three teams. After the round-robin stage, the top two teams from each group competed in the Cup finals round, while all third-placed teams participated in the Bowl League finals.

Cup Finals: The top two teams from each group played in the quarter-final round of the Cup finals, with the winners advancing to the semifinals. The losing teams of the four quarter-finals competed in the Plate semi-finals.

Plate Finals: The losing teams of the four quarter-finals played in the Plate semi-finals. The winners of these semi-finals advanced to the Plate finals.

Bowl League Finals: All four third-placed teams competed in the Bowl League in a round-robin format, with the top two teams qualifying for the Bowl final.

== Teams and squads ==
Pool A			Pool B		
Hong Kong	New Zealand	South Africa	Australia	England	Nepal
Nizakat Khan (c); Zeeshan Ali; Imran Arif; Ehsan Khan; Jason Lui; Sahal Malvernkar; Benny Paras	Todd Astle (c); Xavier Bell; Sam Cassidy; Siddhesh Dixit; Raunaq Kapur; Henry McIntyre; Harmeet Singh	JJ Smuts (c); Matthew Boast; Evan Jones; Luthando Midiri; Don Radebe; Jacques Snyman; Aubrey Swanepoel	Dan Christian (c); Fawad Ahmed; Andrew Fekete; Sam Heazlett; James Pattinson; Alex Ross; Jack Wood	Ravi Bopara (c); Ed Barnard; Ethan Brookes; James Coles; Alex Davies; Samit Patel; Jordan Thompson	Sundeep Jora (c); Lokesh Bam; Pratis GC; Rashid Khan; Dipendra Rawat; Bibek Yadav
Pool C			Pool D		
India	Pakistan	United Arab Emirates	Bangladesh	Oman	Sri Lanka
Robin Uthappa (c); Manoj Tiwari; Stuart Binny; Shreevats Goswami; Kedar Jadhav; Bharat Chipli; Shahbaz Nadeem	Faheem Ashraf (c); Muhammad Akhlaq; Asif Ali; Danish Aziz; Shahab Khan; Hussain Talat; Aamer Yamin	Asif Khan (c); Akif Raja; Khalid Shah; Sanchit Sharma; Ansh Tandon; Zuhaib Zubair	Yasir Ali (c); Abdullah Al Mamun; Jishan Alam; Sohag Gazi; Abu Hider; Nahidul Islam; Mohammad Saifuddin	Sandeep Goud (c); Mujibur Ali; Shoaib Al Balushi; Zikria Islam; Asif Khan; Hassnain Shah; Vinayak Shukla	Lahiru Madushanka (c); Thanuka Dabare; Dhananjaya Lakshan; Tharindu Rathnayake; Lahiru Samarakoon; Nimesh Vimukthi; Sandun Weerakkody

== Group stage ==
Pool A	Pool B	Pool C	Pool D
Hong Kong; New Zealand; South Africa	Australia; England; Nepal	India; Pakistan; United Arab Emirates	Bangladesh; Oman; Sri Lanka

=== Pool A ===
Pos	Team	Pld	W	L	NR	Pts	NRR	Qualification
1	South Africa	2	2	0	0	4	9.467	Advanced to Quarter-finals
2	Hong Kong	2	1	1	0	2	0.063	Advanced to Quarter-finals
3	New Zealand	2	0	2	0	0	−9.500	Advanced to Bowl finals

Source: ESPNcricinfo

==== Fixtures ====
1 November 2024
08:30
Scorecard

Hong Kong; 92/0 (6 overs)	v	South Africa; 94/3 (4.4 overs)
Nizakat Khan 45* (18)		Jacques Snyman 27 (10); Benny Paras 2/25 (1 over)

South Africa won by 3 wickets
Mission Road Ground, Mong Kok
Umpires: Tabarak Dar (HK) and John Prakash (HK)
Player of the match: JJ Smuts (SA)

- South Africa won the toss and elected to field.

1 November 2024
12:10
Scorecard

Hong Kong; 127/4 (6 overs)	v	New Zealand; 100/4 (6 overs)
Nizakat Khan 62* (16); Henry McIntyre 1/49 (2 overs)		Siddhesh Dixit (10); Nizakat Khan 1/7 (1 over)

Hong Kong won by 27 runs
Mission Road Ground, Mong Kok
Umpires: Tabarak Dar (HK) and John Prakash (HK)
Player of the match: Nizakat Khan (HK)

- New Zealand won the toss and elected to field.

1 November 2024
15:45
Scorecard

New Zealand; 41 (4.1 overs)	v	South Africa; 43/1 (2 overs)
Todd Astle 22 (8); Matthew Boast 3/3 (1.1 overs)		Modiri Litheko 30* (6); Siddhesh Dixit 1/22 (1 over)

South Africa won by 5 wickets
Mission Road Ground, Mong Kok
Umpires: Tabarak Dar (HK) and John Prakash (HK)
Player of the match: Matthew Boast (SA)

- South Africa won the toss and elected to field.

=== Pool B ===
Pos	Team	Pld	W	L	NR	Pts	NRR	Qualification
1	Nepal	2	2	0	0	4	3.906	Advance to Quarter-finals
2	Australia	2	1	1	0	2	1.917	Advance to Quarter-finals
3	England	2	0	2	0	0	−6.306	Advance to Bowl finals

Source: ESPNcricinfo

==== Fixtures ====
1 November 2024
09:25
Scorecard

England; 97 (5.5 overs)	v	Nepal; 99/0 (4.2 overs)
Ravi Bopara 49 (12); Pratis GC 3/18 (2 overs)		Sundeep Jora 50* (12)

Nepal won by 6 wickets
Mission Road Ground, Mong Kok
Umpires: Niaz Ali (HK) and Shelton D'Cruz (HK)
Player of the match: Sundeep Jora (Nep)

- Nepal won the toss and elected to field.

1 November 2024
14:55
Scorecard

Australia; 147/1 (6 overs)	v	England; 113/5 (6 overs)
Dan Christian 51* (13); Jordan Thompson 1/31 (1 over)		Ethan Brookes 35* (8); Jack Wood 2/31 (2 overs)

Australia won by 34 runs
Mission Road Ground, Mong Kok
Umpires: Niaz Ali (HK) and Shelton D'Cruz (HK)
Player of the match: Dan Christian (Aus)

- England won the toss and elected to field.

2 November 2024
08:30
Scorecard

Nepal; 111/2 (6 Overs)	v	Australia; 100/5 (6 overs)
Sundeep Jora 51*(16); Jack Wood 2/37 (2 overs)		Jack Wood 55* (16); Pratis GC 3/24 (2 overs)

Nepal won by 11 runs
Mission Road Ground, Mong Kok
Umpires: Niaz Ali (HK) and John Prakash (HK)
Player of the match: Pratis GC (Nep)

- Australia won the toss and elected to field.

=== Pool C ===
Pos	Team	Pld	W	L	NR	Pts	NRR	Qualification
1	Pakistan	2	2	0	0	4	3.136	Advance to Quarter-finals
2	United Arab Emirates	2	1	1	0	2	−1.000	Advance to Quarter-finals
3	India	2	0	2	0	0	−2.152	Advance to Bowl finals

Source: ESPNcricinfo

==== Fixtures ====
1 November 2024
10:20
Scorecard

Pakistan; 128/0 (6 overs)	v	United Arab Emirates; 115/5 (6 overs)
Muhammad Akhlaq 52* (15)		Zuhaib Zubair 53 (14); Asif Ali 2/6 (1 over)

Pakistan won by 13 runs
Mission Road Ground, Mong Kok
Umpires: Tabarak Dar (HK) and John Prakash (HK)
Player of the match: Asif Ali (Pak)

- United Arab Emirates won the toss and elected to field.

1 November 2024
14:00
Scorecard

India; 119/2 (6 overs)	v	Pakistan; 121/0 (5 overs)
Bharat Chipli 53* (16); Faheem Ashraf 2/50 (2 overs)		Asif Ali 55* (14)

Pakistan won by 6 wickets
Mission Road Ground, Mong Kok
Umpires: Tabarak Dar (HK) and John Prakash (HK)
Player of the match: Asif Ali (Pak)

- Pakistan won the toss and elected to field.

2 November 2024
09:25
Scorecard

United Arab Emirates; 130/5 (6 overs)	v	India; 129/4 (6 overs)
Khalid Shah 42 (10); Stuart Binny 3/31 (2 overs)		Stuart Binny 44 (11); Akif Raja 1/21 (1 over)

United Arab Emirates won by 1 run
Mission Road Ground, Mong Kok
Umpires: Tabarak Dar (HK) and Shelton D'Cruz (HK)
Player of the match: Khalid Shah (UAE)

- India won the toss and elected to field.

=== Pool D ===
Pos	Team	Pld	W	L	NR	Pts	NRR	Qualification
1	Sri Lanka	2	2	0	0	4	4.507	Advance to Quarter-finals
2	Bangladesh	2	1	1	0	2	1.333	Advance to Quarter-finals
3	Oman	2	0	2	0	0	−6.441	Advance to Bowl finals

Source: ESPNcricinfo

==== Fixtures ====
1 November 2024
11:15
Scorecard

Oman; 80/2 (6 overs)	v	Sri Lanka; 82/2 (4.1 overs)
Vinayak Shukla 50* (18); Dhananjaya Lakshan 1/4 (1 over)		Sandun Weerakkody 28 (7); Jiten Ramanandi 1/10 (1 over)

Sri Lanka won by 4 wickets
Mission Road Ground, Mong Kok
Umpires: Niaz Ali (HK) and Shelton D'Cruz (HK)
Player of the match: Dhananjaya Lakshan (SL)

- Sri Lanka won the toss and elected to field.

1 November 2024
13:05
Scorecard

Bangladesh; 147/0 (6 overs)	v	Oman; 113/5 (6 overs)
Jishan Alam 55* (12); Mohammad Saifuddin 55* (12)		Vinayak Shukla 29 (8); Jishan Alam 2/12 (1 over)

Bangladesh won by 34 runs
Mission Road Ground, Mong Kok
Umpires: Niaz Ali (HK) and Shelton D'Cruz (HK)
Player of the match: Mohammad Saifuddin (Ban)

- Oman won the toss and elected to field.

1 November 2024
16:40
Scorecard

Sri Lanka; 107/3 (6)	v	Bangladesh; 89/3 (6 overs)
Lahiru Madushanka 48* (17); Jishan Alam 2/6 (1 over)		Mohammad Saifuddin 42* (17); Lahiru Samarakoon 2/26 (2 overs)

Sri Lanka won by 18 runs
Mission Road Ground, Mong Kok
Umpires: Niaz Ali (HK) and Shelton D'Cruz (HK)
Player of the match: Lahiru Madushanka (SL)

- Bangladesh won the toss and elected to field.

== Quarter-finals ==
=== Quarter-final 1 ===
2 November 2024
12:10
Scorecard

Australia; 129/3 (6 overs)	v	Hong Kong; 116/0 (6 overs)
Dan Christian 53* (15); Imran Arif 1/14 (1 over)		Nizakat Khan 51* (12)

Australia won by 13 runs
Mission Road Ground, Mong Kok
Umpires: Niaz Ali (HK) and John Prakash (HK)
Player of the match: Dan Christian (Aus)

- Hong Kong won the toss and elected to field.

=== Quarter-final 2 ===
2 November 2024
13:05
Scorecard

Pakistan; 105/3 (6 overs)	v	South Africa; 88/4 (6 overs)
Muhammad Akhlaq 53* (16); Evan Jones 2/14 (1 over)		Evan Jones 41 (13); Hussain Talat 2/17 (1 over)

Pakistan won by 17 runs
Mission Road Ground, Mong Kok
Umpires: Tabarak Dar (HK) and Shelton D'Cruz (HK)
Player of the match: Hussain Talat (Pak)

- South Africa won the toss and elected to field.

=== Quarter-final 3 ===
2 November 2024
15:45
Scorecard

Sri Lanka; 123/2 (6 overs)	v	Nepal; 83 (5 overs)
Sandun Weerakkody 50* (14); Narayan Joshi 1/28 (1 over)		Rashid Khan 55 (18); Lahiru Samarakoon 2/6 (1 over)

Sri Lanka won by 40 runs
Mission Road Ground, Mong Kok
Umpires: Niaz Ali (HK) and Ramasamy Venkatesh (HK)
Player of the match: Lahiru Samarakoon (SL)

- Nepal won the toss and elected to field.

=== Quarter-final 4 ===
2 November 2024
16:40
Scorecard

Bangladesh; 111/1 (6 overs)	v	United Arab Emirates; 43/3 (3.2 overs)
Mohammad Saifuddin 36* (9); Zuhaib Zubair 1/13 (1 over)		Sanchit Sharma 25 (6); Mohammad Saifuddin 2/7 (1.2 overs)

Bangladesh won by 18 runs (DLS method)
Mission Road Ground, Mong Kok
Umpires: Tabarak Dar (HK) and John Prakash (HK)
Player of the match: Mohammad Saifuddin (Ban)

- United Arab Emirates won the toss and elected to field.
- No further play was possible due to bad light.

== Bowl finals ==
=== Points table ===
Pos	Team	Pld	W	L	NR	Pts	NRR	Qualification
1	Oman	3	3	0	0	6	6.388	Advanced to Bowl Final
2	England	3	2	1	0	4	−2.444	Advanced to Bowl Final
3	New Zealand	3	1	2	0	2	1.556	
4	India	3	0	3	0	0	−5.522	

Source: FanCode, ESPN India, Cricket.com

==== Fixtures ====
2 November 2024
10:20
Scorecard

Oman; 103/3 (6 overs)	v	New Zealand; 95/2 (6 overs)
Vinayak Shukla 53* (14); Sam Cassidy 1/9 (1 over)		Raunaq Kapur 50* (17); Mujibur Ali 1/9 (1 over)

Oman won by 8 runs
Mission Road Ground, Mong Kok
Umpires: Niaz Ali (HK) and John Prakash (HK)
Player of the match: Vinayak Shukla (Oma)

- New Zealand won the toss and elected to field.

2 November 2024
11:15
Scorecard

England; 120/1 (6 overs)	v	India; 105/3 (6 overs)
Ravi Bopara 53* (14)		Kedar Jadhav 48* (15); Ravi Bopara 2/11 (1 over)

England won by 15 runs
Mission Road Ground, Mong Kok
Umpires: Tabarak Dar (HK) and Shelton D'Cruz (HK)
Player of the match: Ravi Bopara (Eng)

- India won the toss and elected to field.

2 November 2024
14:00
Scorecard

New Zealand; 146/3 (6 overs)	v	India; 102/2 (6 overs)
Siddhesh Dixit 55* (12); Stuart Binny 1/14 (1 over)		Shreevats Goswami 42* (16); Sam Cassidy 1/13 (1 over)

New Zealand won by 44 runs
Mission Road Ground, Mong Kok
Umpires: Niaz Ali (HK) and Ramasamy Venkatesh (HK)
Player of the match: Siddhesh Dixit (NZ)

- India won the toss and elected to field.

2 November 2024
14:55
Scorecard

Oman; 159/0 (6 overs)	v	England; 92/4 (6 overs)
Vinayak Shukla 51* (10); Hassnain Shah 51* (10)		Ed Barnard 57* (16); Zikria Islam 1/8 (1 over)

Oman won by 67 runs
Mission Road Ground, Mong Kok
Umpires: Tabarak Dar (HK) and Shelton D'Cruz (HK)
Player of the match: Vinayak Shukla (Oma)

- England won the toss and elected to field.

3 November 2024
08:30
Scorecard

England; 116/4 (6 overs)	v	New Zealand; 108/2 (6 overs)
Ravi Bopara 62* (15); Raunaq Kapur 3/13 (1 over)		Siddhesh Dixit 45 (18); Ethan Brookes 1/26 (1 over)

England won by 8 runs
Mission Road Ground, Mong Kok
Umpires: Niaz Ali (HK) and John Prakash (HK)
Player of the match: Ravi Bopara (Eng)

- England won the toss and elected to bat.

3 November 2024
11:15
Scorecard

India; 119/3 (6 overs)	v	Oman; 120/0 (4.2 overs)
Robin Uthappa 52* (13); Asif Khan 1/17 (1 over)		Vinayak Shukla 54* (11)

Oman won by 6 wickets
Mission Road Ground, Mong Kok
Umpires: Niaz Ali (HK) and Ramasamy Venkatesh (HK)
Player of the match: Vinayak Shukla (Oma)

- India won the toss and elected to bat.

=== Bowl Final ===
3 November 2024
14:35
Scorecard

England; 123/1 (6 overs)	v	Oman; 124/2 (5.5 overs)
Jordan Thompson 55* (18); Mujibur Ali 1/7 (1 over)		Asif Khan 47* (17); James Coles 1/15 (1 over)

Oman won by 4 wickets
Mission Road Ground, Mong Kok
Umpires: Tabarak Dar (HK) and John Prakash (HK)
Player of the match: Asif Khan (Oma)

- England won the toss and elected to bat.

== Plate finals ==
=== Plate Semi-finals ===
3 November 2024
09:25
Scorecard

Hong Kong; 92/4 (6 overs)	v	South Africa; 93/2 (5.3 overs)
Sahal Malvernkar 25 (6); JJ Smuts 1/8 (1 over)		Modiri Litheko 41* (15); Sahal Malvernkar 1/8 (0.3 over)

South Africa won by 4 wickets
Mission Road Ground, Mong Kok
Umpires: Tabarak Dar (HK) and Ramasamy Venkatesh (HK)
Player of the match: Modiri Litheko (SA)

- South Africa won the toss and elected to field.

3 November 2024
10:20
Scorecard

Nepal; 94/3 (6 overs)	v	United Arab Emirates; 96/1 (5.2 overs)
Bibek Yadav 49* (16); Akif Raja 2/30 (2 overs)		Asif Khan 55* (15); Rashid Khan 1/25 (2 overs)

United Arab Emirates won by 5 wickets
Mission Road Ground, Mong Kok
Umpires: John Prakash (HK) and Shelton D'Cruz (HK)
Player of the match: Sanchit Sharma (UAE)

- United Arab Emirates won the toss and elected to field.

=== Plate Final ===
3 November 2024
15:25
Scorecard

South Africa; 96/4 (6 overs)	v	United Arab Emirates; 95/4 (6 overs)
JJ Smuts 67* (18); Asif Khan 1/10 (1 over)		Asif Khan 26 (9); Matthew Boast 2/23 (2 overs)

South Africa won by 1 run
Mission Road Ground, Mong Kok
Umpires: Niaz Ali (HK) and Shelton D'Cruz (HK)
Player of the match: JJ Smuts (SA)

- United Arab Emirates won the toss and elected to field.

== Cup finals ==
=== Semi-finals ===
==== Semi-final 1 ====
3 November 2024
12:50
Scorecard

Australia; 107/1 (6 overs)	v	Pakistan; 109/2 (5.5 overs)
Dan Christian 42* (10); Faheem Ashraf 1/12 (1 over)		Asif Ali 32 (8); Fawad Ahmed 1/18 (1 over)

Pakistan won by 4 wickets
Mission Road Ground, Mong Kok
Umpires: Tabarak Dar (HK) and John Prakash (HK)
Player of the match: Faheem Ashraf (Pak)

- Pakistan won the toss and elected to field.

==== Semi-final 2 ====
3 November 2024
13:40
Scorecard

Bangladesh; 103/5 (6 overs)	v	Sri Lanka; 104/3 (5.5 overs)
Jishan Alam 36 (11); Tharindu Rathnayake 4/33 (2 overs)		Sandun Weerakkody 50* (16); Jishan Alam 2/4 (1 over)

Sri Lanka won by 3 wickets
Mission Road Ground, Mong Kok
Umpires: Shelton D'Cruz (HK) and Ramasamy Venkatesh (HK)
Player of the match: Tharindu Rathnayake (SL)

- Bangladesh won the toss and elected to bat.

=== Final ===
3 November 2024
16:25
Scorecard

Pakistan; 72 (5.2 overs)	v	Sri Lanka; 76/3 (5 overs)
Muhammad Akhlaq 48 (20); Dhananjaya Lakshan 2/6 (1 over)		Sandun Weerakkody 34 (13); Hussain Talat 1/18 (1 over)

Sri Lanka won by 3 wickets
Mission Road Ground, Mong Kok
Umpires: Tabarak Dar (HK) and Ramasamy Venkatesh (HK)
Player of the match: Dhananjaya Lakshan (SL)

- Sri Lanka won the toss and elected to field.

== Final standings ==
Position	Team	Placing
1st	Sri Lanka	Champions
2nd	Pakistan	Runners-up
Semi-finalists	Australia	
Semi-finalists	Bangladesh	
5th	South Africa	Plate winners
6th	United Arab Emirates	Plate runners-up
Plate semi-finalists	Nepal	
Plate semi-finalists	Hong Kong	
9th	Oman	Bowl winners
10th	England	Bowl runners-up
11th	New Zealand	
12th	India	

== Women's exhibition match ==
A women's exhibition match was held on the final day of the tournament to commemorate the 75th anniversary of the founding of the People's Republic of China.

=== Squads ===
China	Hong Kong
Shan Limin; Cai Yuanyuan; Yin Wenjing; Lyu Zhongyuan; Zhu Mingyue; Chen Xinyu	Maryam Bibi; Alison Siu; Kary Chan; Shanzeen Shahzad; Natasha Miles; Lemon Cheung

3 November 2024
12:10
Scorecard

Hong Kong; 61/0 (5 overs)	v	China; 36/3 (5 overs)
Natasha Miles 31* (15)		Cai Yuanyuan 7* (6); Kary Chan 2/3 (1 over)

Hong Kong won by 25 runs
Mission Road Ground, Mong Kok
Player of the match: Kary Chan (HK)

- China won the toss and elected to field.
