= 2026 Lanka Premier League players' draft =

General information
- Sport: Cricket
- Date: 1 June 2026
- Time: 14:30 (SLST)
- Location: Colombo, Sri Lanka

Overview
- 77 total selections in 10 rounds
- League: 2026 Lanka Premier League
- Teams: 5
- Most selections: 16 each by Colombo Kaps; Galle Gallants; Kandy Royals
- Fewest selections: 14 by Dambulla Sixers

The 2026 Lanka Premier League was the 6th edition of the Lanka Premier League (LPL), a professional Twenty20 (T20) cricket league held in Sri Lanka, organised by Sri Lanka Cricket (SLC). It has been held annually since the first edition in 2020 with the exception of 2025. In January 2026, the SLC announced that instead of an auction a players' draft would be held ahead of the 2026 season. The players' draft was originally scheduled for 22 March 2026 but was postponed to 1 June 2026. Overseas player registrations commenced on 8 May. Over 650 players from 21 countries registered for the draft, 310 of whom were shortlisted. Twenty players including ten overseas players were directly signed before the draft. A total of 77 players including 25 overseas players were signed in the draft.

== Pre-draft direct signings ==
Each team was allowed to sign two Icon players and two Star players, one of each being a domestic player and the other an overseas player, with a salary range of US$60,000 to US$80,000. The SLC initially required the Icon and Star players to have more than 250,000 social media followers; this rule was vacated after people spoke out against it.

Pre-draft direct signings
Player category	Salary range	Colombo Kaps	Dambulla Sixers	Galle Gallants	Jaffna Kings	Kandy Royals
Domestic Icon	US$60,000 – US$80,000	Kusal Mendis	Dushmantha Chameera	Dasun Shanaka	Bhanuka Rajapaksa	Wanindu Hasaranga
Domestic Star	US$60,000 – US$80,000	Kamindu Mendis	Dinesh Chandimal	Eshan Malinga	Dunith Wellalage	Angelo Mathews
Overseas Icon	US$60,000 – US$80,000	James Neesham	Sahibzada Farhan	Rassie van der Dussen	Shakib Al Hasan	Moeen Ali
Overseas Star	US$60,000 – US$80,000	Ben McDermott	Reeza Hendricks	Litton Das (Note: Galle Gallants originally signed Sikandar Raza pre-draft, but due to his unavailability he was replaced by Litton Das.)	Taskin Ahmed	Vijay Shankar

== Players' draft ==
Each team was required to sign at least 14 players, with a maximum of 16 players under 10 categories, including 5 overseas players in 4 categories. One overseas player had to be from an associate country, while two domestic players had to be under the age of 23.

Domestic player signings
Player category	Salary	Colombo Kaps	Dambulla Sixers	Galle Gallants	Jaffna Kings	Kandy Royals
Platinum	US$50,000	Binura Fernando	Maheesh Theekshana	Charith Asalanka	Avishka Fernando	Nuwan Thushara
Gold	US$30,000 each	Sadeera Samarawickrama	Niroshan Dickwella	Pramod Madushan	Dilshan Madushanka	Kusal Perera
Gold	US$30,000 each	Milan Rathnayake	Pavan Rathnayake	Lasith Croospulle	Kamil Mishara	Asitha Fernando
Gold	US$30,000 each	Janith Liyanage	Akila Dananjaya	Vijayakanth Viyaskanth	Traveen Mathew	Garuka Sanketh
Classic	US$20,000 each	Jeffrey Vandersay	Dhananjaya Lakshan	Sahan Arachchige	Mohamed Shiraz	Vishen Halambage
Classic	US$20,000 each	Thanuka Dabare	Ramesh Mendis	Chamika Karunaratne	Chamindu Wickramasinghe	Muditha Lakshan
Classic	US$20,000 each	Movin Subasingha	Sachitha Jayathilake	Tharindu Rathnayake	Nuwanidu Fernando	Lahiru Udara
Emerging U23	US$10,000 each	Malsha Tharupathi	Vishwa Lahiru Kumara	Dinura Kalupahana	Kugathas Mathulan	Sahan Mihira
Emerging U23	US$10,000 each	Sharujan Shanmuganathan	Gayana Weerasinghe	Yuri Koththigoda	Praveen Manisha	Pavan Sandesh
Optional Gold	US$30,000	Wanuja Sahan	—N/a	Kasun Rajitha	Nishan Madushka	Dushan Hemantha
Optional Classic	US$20,000	Anthony Arul Pragasam	—N/a	Sachindu Colombage	—N/a	Isitha Wijesundara

Overseas player signings
Player category	Salary	Colombo Kaps	Dambulla Sixers	Galle Gallants	Jaffna Kings	Kandy Royals
Platinum	US$50,000	Mujeeb Ur Rahman	Fazalhaq Farooqi	Mohammad Nawaz	David Wiese	Rahmanullah Gurbaz
Gold	US$30,000	Shahnawaz Dahani	Mohammad Wasim Jr.	Akif Javed	Ibrahim Zadran	Daniel Sams
Classic	US$20,000 each	Mohammad Haris	Gulbadin Naib	Sam Harper	Sandeep Lamichhane	Dale Phillips
Classic	US$20,000 each	Hasan Mahmud	Dian Forrester	Mehidy Hasan Miraz	Lizaad Williams	Zahir Khan
Associate Star	US$15,000	Kushal Bhurtel	Shadley van Schalkwyk	Haider Ali	Dipendra Singh Airee	Brandon McMullen

== Withdrawn players ==
Withdrawn players from the 2026 Lanka Premier League
Player	Team	Category	Reason	Withdrawal announcement date	Replacement player	Signing date	Ref.
Rahmanullah Gurbaz	Kandy Royals	Overseas Platinum	National duty	4 June 2026	Sediqullah Atal	8 July 2026	
Haider Ali	Galle Gallants	Associate Star	National duty	16 June 2026	Virandeep Singh	16 June 2026	
Dian Forrester	Dambulla Sixers	Overseas Classic	Participating in GSL	19 June 2026	Marques Ackerman	19 June 2026	
Mohammad Haris	Colombo Kaps	Overseas Classic	Participating in GSL	1 July 2026	Rubin Hermann	1 July 2026	
Dipendra Singh Airee	Jaffna Kings	Associate Star	National duty	8 July 2026	Zahoor Khan	8 July 2026	
Rassie van der Dussen	Galle Gallants	Overseas Icon	Personal reasons	9 July 2026	Chris Lynn	11 July 2026	
Daniel Sams	Kandy Royals	Overseas Gold	Personal reasons	11 July 2026	Shaheen Shah Afridi	12 July 2026	
Litton Das	Galle Gallants	Overseas Star	Left calf injury	14 July 2026	Nurul Hasan	15 July 2026	
Kusal Mendis	Colombo Kaps	Domestic Icon	Hamstring injury	22 July 2026	Ashen Bandara	24 July 2026	
Taskin Ahmed	Jaffna Kings	Overseas Star	National duty	23 July 2026	Tawhid Hridoy	23 July 2026	
Vishen Halambage	Kandy Royals	Domestic Classic	Hamstring injury	25 July 2026	Kavija Gamage	25 July 2026	
Hasan Mahmud	Colombo Kaps	Overseas Classic	National duty	27 July 2026	Ripon Mondol	27 July 2026	
Fazalhaq Farooqi	Dambulla Sixers	Overseas Platinum	National duty	27 July 2026	Sikandar Raza	27 July 2026	
Mehidy Hasan Miraz	Galle Gallants	Overseas Classic	National duty	31 July 2026	Tom Rogers	31 July 2026	
Brandon McMullen	Kandy Royals	Associate Star	National duty	1 August 2026	—N/a		
Ibrahim Zadran	Jaffna Kings	Overseas Gold	National duty	1 August 2026	Khawaja Nafay	1 August 2026	
Moeen Ali	Kandy Royals	Overseas Icon	Domestic commitments	1 August 2026	—N/a		
Sediqullah Atal	Kandy Royals	Overseas Platinum	National duty	1 August 2026	—N/a		
