= 2025 SLC Invitational T20 League =

Cricket tournament in Sri Lanka

- Dates: 7 – 16 August 2025
- Administrator: Sri Lanka Cricket
- Cricket format: Twenty20
- Tournament format(s): Double round-robin and final
- Host: Sri Lanka
- Champions: SLC Greens (1st title)
- Participants: 3
- Matches: 7
- Most runs: Nuwanidu Fernando (155)
- Most wickets: Chamika Karunaratne (8)

The 2025 Dialog SLC Invitational T20 League was a Twenty20 cricket tournament that took place in Sri Lanka from 7 to 16 August 2025. All the matches were played at the Sinhalese Sports Club Cricket Ground, in Colombo. The series was used as preparation for the 2025 Asia Cup. Three teams took part, with the top two sides playing each other in the final.

== Squads ==
The following teams and squads were named for the tournament.

SLC Blues	SLC Greens	SLC Greys
Dunith Wellalage (c); Pathum Nissanka; Vishen Halambage; Kusal Perera; Dasun Shanaka; Dhananjaya de Silva; Jeffrey Vandersay; Ahan Wickramasinghe; Akila Dananjaya; Matheesha Pathirana; Asitha Fernando; Dilshan Madushanka; Lilan Rangana; Mohamed Shiraz; Ravindu Fernando; Ashen Bandara; Nishan Madushka; Senitha Halambage	Kamindu Mendis (c); Lasith Croospulle; Sadeera Samarawickrama; Bhanuka Rajapaksa; Pavan Rathnayake; Chamika Karunaratne; Dushan Hemantha; Trevin Mathew; Nuwan Thushara; Dushmantha Chameera; Pramod Madushan; Janith Liyanage; Dulaj Samuditha; Tharindu Rathnayake; Nimesh Vimukthi; Kamil Mishara; Lahiru Madushanka; Sonal Dinusha	Charith Asalanka (c); Dinesh Chandimal; Niroshan Dickwella; Lahiru Udara; Nuwanindu Fernando; Ramesh Mendis; Chamindu Wickramasinghe; Vijayakanth Theekshana; Eshan Malinga; Binura Fernando; Garuka Sanketh; Movin Subasingha; Milan Rathnayake; Melon Hansaka; Sahan Arachchige; Shevon Daniel; Sineth Jayawardena

== Points table ==
Pos	Team	Pld	W	L	NR	Pts	NRR	Qualification
1	SLC Greens	4	3	0	1	7	2.196	Advanced to final
2	SLC Greys	4	2	1	1	5	0.323	Advanced to final
3	SLC Blues	4	0	4	0	0	−1.907	

Source: ESPNcricinfo

== Round-robin ==
7 August 2025
13:30
Scorecard

SLC Blues; 143 (19.4 overs)	v	SLC Greens; 144/6 (16.5 overs)
Pathum Nissanka 28 (10); Chamika Karunaratne 3/17 (4 overs)		Chamika Karunaratne 47* (31); Dasun Shanaka 3/17 (2 overs)

SLC Greens won by 4 wickets
Sinhalese Sports Club Cricket Ground, Colombo
Umpires: Ravindra Kottahachchi and Asanka Nanayakkara

- SLC Blues won the toss and elected to bat.

8 August 2025
13:30
Scorecard

SLC Greys; 192/4 (20 overs)	v	SLC Blues; 168/8 (20 overs)
Nuwanidu Fernando 70* (52); Dhananjaya de Silva 1/14 (2 overs)		Vishen Halambage 35 (18); Eshan Malinga 4/42 (4 overs)

SLC Greys won by 24 runs
Sinhalese Sports Club Cricket Ground, Colombo
Umpires: Shantha Fonseka and Lyndon Hannibal

- SLC Blues won the toss and elected to field.

10 August 2025
13:30
Scorecard

SLC Greys; 163/6 (20 overs)	v	SLC Greens; 165/5 (16.4 overs)
Niroshan Dickwella 52 (37); Kamindu Mendis 2/14 (4 overs)		Kamil Mishara 52 (34); Vijayakanth Viyaskanth 2/24 (4 overs)

SLC Greens won by 5 wickets
Sinhalese Sports Club Cricket Ground, Colombo
Umpires: Damith Sanjeewa and Raveendra Wimalasiri

- SLC Greens won the toss and elected to field.

11 August 2025
13:30
Scorecard

SLC Greens; 158/6 (20 overs)	v	SLC Blues; 86 (15 overs)
Kamindu Mendis 50 (39); Akila Dananjaya 2/25 (4 overs)		Dhananjaya de Silva 18 (20); Dushan Hemantha 4/18 (4 overs)

SLC Greens won by 72 runs
Sinhalese Sports Club Cricket Ground, Colombo
Umpires: Ruchira Palliyaguruge and Upul Wewage

- SLC Blues won the toss and elected to field.

13 August 2025
13:30
Scorecard

SLC Blues; 178/6 (20 overs)	v	SLC Greys; 179/4 (17.1 overs)
Ravindu Fernando 41 (24); Garuka Sanketh 2/46 (3 overs)		Nuwanidu Fernando 50* (34); Matheesha Pathirana 2/32 (3 overs)

SLC Greys won by 6 wickets
Sinhalese Sports Club Cricket Ground, Colombo
Umpires: Hemantha Boteju and Chamara de Soysa

- SLC Blues won the toss and elected to bat.

14 August 2025
13:30
Scorecard

SLC Greens; 46/1 (3 overs)	v	SLC Greys
Kamil Mishara 37* (11); Garuka Sanketh 1/9 (1 over)

No result
Sinhalese Sports Club Cricket Ground, Colombo
Umpires: Chandrika Amarasinghe and Saman Mohan de Silva

- SLC Greens won the toss and elected to bat.
- The match was reduced to 16 overs per side due to rain.
- No further play was possible due to rain.

== Final ==
16 August 2025
13:30
Scorecard

SLC Greens; 189/4 (20 overs)	v	SLC Greys; 166/8 (20 overs)
Kusal Mendis 77 (47); Vijayakanth Viyaskanth 2/45 (4 overs)		Niroshan Dickwella 50 (28); Chamika Karunaratne 3/24 (4 overs)

SLC Greens won by 23 runs
Sinhalese Sports Club Cricket Ground, Colombo
Umpires: Prageeth Rambukwella and Raveendra Wimalasiri

- SLC Greys won the toss and elected to field.
