= 2022 SLC Invitational T20 League =

Cricket tournament

- Dates: 8 – 15 August 2022
- Administrator: Sri Lanka Cricket
- Cricket format: Twenty20
- Tournament format: Round-robin then knockout
- Host: Sri Lanka
- Champions: SLC Reds (1st title)
- Participants: 4
- Matches: 7
- Player of the series: Asitha Fernando (Reds)
- Most runs: Kusal Mendis (206)
- Most wickets: Asitha Fernando (10)

The 2022 Skyexch SLC Invitational T20 League was a Twenty20 cricket tournament that took place in Sri Lanka from 8 to 15 August 2022. All the matches were played at the R Premadasa International Cricket Stadium, in Colombo. The series was used as preparation for 2022 Asia Cup and the 2022 ICC Men's T20 World Cup. Four teams took part, with the top two sides playing each other in the final.

In the final, SLC Reds beat SLC Blues by 7 wickets to win the tournament. Kusal Mendis was named the player of the match in the final and Asitha Fernando was named the player of the series.

== Squads ==
The following teams and squads were named for the tournament.

SLC Blues	SLC Greens	SLC Reds	SLC Greys
Charith Asalanka (c); Danushka Gunathilaka; Sadeera Samarawickrama; Dhananjaya de Silva; Ashen Bandara; Suminda Lakshan; Chamika Karunaratne; Pramod Madushan; Lahiru Kumara; Praveen Jayawickrama; Kasun Rajitha; Lahiru Udara; Lahiru Samarakoon; Ashen Daniel; Nipun Ransika	Dasun Shanaka (c); Niroshan Dickwella; Pathum Nissanka; Nuwanidu Fernando; Dinesh Chandimal; Dananjaya Lakshan; Ramesh Mendis; Binura Fernando; Nuwan Thushara; Jeffrey Vandersay; Lakshan Sandakan; Saminda Fernando; Dilshan Madushanka; Nimesh Vimukthi; Sachindu Colombage	Kusal Mendis (c); Lasith Croospulle; Bhanuka Rajapaksa; Kamindu Mendis; Wanindu Hasaranga; Sahan Arachchige; Dunith Wellalage; Lahiru Madushanka; Matheesha Pathirana; Maheesh Theekshana; Dushmantha Chameera; Pabasara Waduge; Kalana Perera; Kevin Koththigoda; Sithara Gimhan	Ashan Priyanjan (c); Ashan Randika; Sangeeth Cooray; Thanuka Dabare; Minod Bhanuka; Movin Subasingha; Muditha Lakshan; Akila Dananjaya; Duvindu Tillakaratne; Milan Rathnayake; Lakshan Gamage; Nimasara Atharagalla; Pulina Tharanga; Tharindu Ratnayake; Kasun Vidura

== Fixtures ==
=== Round-robin ===
8 August 2022
15:00
Scorecard

SLC Greys; 120/9 (20 overs)	v	SLC Reds; 121/4 (16.5 overs)
Movin Subasingha 32 (25); Asitha Fernando 4/22 (4 overs)		Lasith Croospulle 54 (44); Akila Dananjaya 2/36 (4 overs)

SLC Reds won by 6 wickets
R Premadasa International Cricket Stadium, Colombo
Umpires: Raveendra Wimalasiri and Ruchira Palliyaguruge
Player of the match: Asitha Fernando (Reds)

- SLC Reds won the toss and elected to field.
- SLC Reds 2, SLC Greys 0

8 August 2022
19:30 (N)
Scorecard

SLC Blues; 122/9 (20 overs)	v	SLC Greens; 90 (18.3 overs)
Ashen Bandara 37* (34); Jeffrey Vandersay 3/12 (4 overs)		Dasun Shanaka 37 (39); Praveen Jayawickrama 2/16 (4 overs)

SLC Blues won by 32 runs
R Premadasa International Cricket Stadium, Colombo
Umpires: Keerthi Bandara and Lyndon Hannibal
Player of the match: Dilshan Madushanka (Blues)

- SLC Blues won the toss and elected to bat.
- SLC Blues 2, SLC Greens 0

10 August 2022
15:00
Scorecard

SLC Greens; 161/6 (20 overs)	v	SLC Reds; 153/5 (20 overs)
Niroshan Dickwella 76* (56); Asitha Fernando 2/32 (4 overs)		Bhanuka Rajapaksa 34 (28); Ramesh Mendis 1/22 (4 overs)

SLC Greens won by 8 runs
R Premadasa International Cricket Stadium, Colombo
Umpires: Prageeth Rambukwella and Raveendra Wimalasiri
Player of the match: Niroshan Dickwella (Greens)

- SLC Greens won the toss and elected to bat.
- SLC Greens 2, SLC Reds 0

10 August 2022
19:30 (N)
Scorecard

SLC Greys; 115/9 (20 overs)	v	SLC Blues; 119/6 (18.3 overs)
Thanuka Dabare 33 (30); Praveen Jayawickrama 3/13 (4 overs)		Charith Asalanka 29 (20); Milan Rathnayake 3/20 (3 overs)

SLC Blues won by 4 wickets
R Premadasa International Cricket Stadium, Colombo
Umpires: Deepal Gunawardene and Ruchira Palliyaguruge
Player of the match: Praveen Jayawickrama (Blues)

- SLC Greys won the toss and elected to bat.
- SLC Blues 2, SLC Greys 0

13 August 2022
15:00
Scorecard

SLC Greys; 166/7 (20 overs)	v	SLC Greens; 85 (15.5 overs)
Thanuka Dabare 66 (40); Lakshan Sandakan 2/14 (4 overs)		Niroshan Dickwella 27 (26); Pulina Tharanga 3/12 (2.5 overs)

SLC Greys won by 81 runs
R Premadasa International Cricket Stadium, Colombo
Umpires: Prageeth Rambukwella and Raveendra Wimalasiri
Player of the match: Thanuka Dabare (Greys)

- SLC Greens won the toss and elected to field.
- SLC Greys 2, SLC Greens 0

13 August 2022
19:30 (N)
Scorecard

SLC Reds; 178/4 (4 overs)	v	SLC Blues; 145/6 (20 overs)
Kusal Mendis 86 (60); Suminda Lakshan 2/29 (4 overs)		Sadeera Samarawickrama 40 (38); Wanindu Hasaranga 2/18 (4 overs)

SLC Reds won by 33 runs
R Premadasa International Cricket Stadium, Colombo
Umpires: Deepal Gunawardene and Lyndon Hannibal
Player of the match: Wanindu Hasaranga (Reds)

- SLC Reds won the toss and elected to bat.
- SLC Reds 2, SLC Blues 0

=== Final ===
15 August 2022
19:00 (N)
Scorecard

SLC Blues; 136/6 (20 overs)	v	SLC Reds; 137/3 (16.5 overs)
Ashen Bandara 40* (30); Maheesh Theekshana 2/22 (4 overs)		Kusal Mendis 56* (45); Praveen Jayawickrama 2/34 (4 overs)

SLC Reds won by 7 wickets.
R Premadasa International Cricket Stadium, Colombo
Umpires: Raveendra Wimalasiri and Ruchira Palliyaguruge
Player of the match: Kusal Mendis (Reds)

- SLC Reds won the toss and elected to field.
