= 2022 Galle Gladiators season =

Galle based franchise cricket team in Sri Lanka

Galle Gladiators
2022 season
- Coach: Moin Khan
- Captain: Kusal Mendis
- Tournament performance: Elminator (4th)
- Most runs: Kusal Mendis (227)
- Most wickets: Nuwan Thushara (15)

The Galle Gladiators (GG) is the franchise cricket team based in Galle, Southern Province, Sri Lanka which has been playing in the Lanka Premier League (LPL) since the first edition of the tournament in 2020. They were one of the five teams to compete in the 2022 Lanka Premier League. The team was captained by Kusal Mendis and coached by Moin Khan.

== Squad ==
- Players with international caps are listed in **bold**
- Ages given as of 6 December 2022, the date of the first match played in the tournament

No.	Name	Nationality	Date of birth (age)	Batting style	Bowling style	Notes
Batsman
96	**Iftikhar Ahmed**	Pakistan	3 September 1990 (aged 32)	Right-handed	Right-arm offbreak	Overseas player
	**Asad Shafiq**	Pakistan	28 January 1986 (aged 36)	Right-handed	Right-arm offbreak	Overseas player
27	Nuwanidu Fernando	Sri Lanka	13 October 1999 (aged 23)	Right-handed	Right-arm off break	
18	Shammu Ashan	Sri Lanka	9 January 1998 (aged 24)	Right-handed	Right-arm off break	
	Thanuka Dabare	Sri Lanka	20 August 1998 (aged 24)	Left-handed		
All-rounders
9	**Imad Wasim**	Pakistan	18 December 1988 (aged 33)	Left-handed	Slow left arm orthodox	Overseas player
88	Pulina Tharanga	Sri Lanka	23 January 1993 (aged 29)	Right-handed	Right-arm leg break	
78	Nimesh Vimukthi	Sri Lanka	7 May 1997 (aged 25)	Left-handed	Slow left arm orthodox	
6	Movin Subasingha	Sri Lanka	6 July 2000 (aged 22)	Right-handed	Right-arm off break	
Wicket-keepers
13	**Kusal Mendis**	Sri Lanka	2 February 1995 (aged 27)	Right-handed	Right-arm leg break	Captain
	**Kusal Perera**	Sri Lanka	17 August 1990 (aged 32)	Left-handed	Right-arm medium	
23	**Azam Khan**	Pakistan	10 August 1998 (aged 24)	Right-handed	—	Overseas player
Spin bowlers
85	**Lakshan Sandakan**	Sri Lanka	10 June 1991 (aged 31)	Right-handed	Left-arm unorthodox spin	
55	**Tharindu Kaushal**	Sri Lanka	5 March 1993 (aged 29)	Right-handed	Right-arm off break	
50	Sachindu Colombage	Sri Lanka	21 February 1998 (aged 24)	Right-handed	Right-arm leg break	
Pace bowlers
63	**Nuwan Pradeep**	Sri Lanka	6 August 1994 (aged 28)	Right-handed	Right-arm fast-medium	
48	**Anwar Ali**	Pakistan	25 November 1987 (aged 35)	Right-handed	Right-arm fast-medium	Overseas player
47	**Wahab Riaz**	Pakistan	28 June 1985 (aged 37)	Right-handed	Left-arm fast	Overseas player
	**Mohammad Hasnain**	Pakistan	18 December 1988 (aged 33)	Right-handed	Right-arm fast	Overseas player
4	**Nuwan Thushara**	Sri Lanka	6 August 1994 (aged 28)	Right-handed	Right-arm fast-medium	
	Nipun Malinga	Sri Lanka	27 February 2000 (aged 22)	Left-handed	Right-arm fast-medium	
	Lakshan Gamage	Sri Lanka	9 January 2001 (aged 21)	Left-handed	Right-arm medium-fast	

- Source: Espncricinfo series home

== Teams and standings ==
=== Results by match ===
Round	1	2	3	4	5	6	7	8
Result	L	L	W	W	L	L	L	L

Source: Fixtures
W = Win; L = Lost; NR = No Result

=== Points table ===
Pos	Team	Pld	W	L	NR	Pts	NRR
1	Kandy Falcons (3rd)	8	7	1	0	14	1.884
2	Jaffna Kings (C)	8	6	2	0	12	1.010
3	Colombo Stars (R)	8	3	5	0	6	−0.847
4	Galle Gladiators (4th)	8	2	6	0	4	−0.936
5	Dambulla Aura	8	2	6	0	4	−1.198

Source: ESPN Cricinfo

== League stage ==
Match 1
6 December 2022
15:00 (D/N)
Scorecard

Jaffna Kings; 137 (19.5 overs)	v	Galle Gladiators; 113 (20 overs)
Dunith Wellalage 30 (20); Iftikhar Ahmed 2/8 (1 over)		Kusal Mendis 51 (43); Binura Fernando 3/22 (3 overs)

Jaffna Kings won by 24 runs
Mahinda Rajapaksa International Cricket Stadium, Hambantota
Umpires: Ravindra Kottahachchi (SL) and Ruchira Palliyaguruge (SL)
Player of the match: Dunith Wellalage (Jaffna Kings)

- Galle Gladiators won the toss and elected to field.

Match 4
7 December 2022
19:30 (D/N)
Scorecard

Galle Gladiators; 121/8 (20 overs)	v	Kandy Falcons; 123/5 (15 overs)
Movin Subasingha 40 (38); Carlos Brathwaite 4/14 (4 overs)		Kamindu Mendis 44 (34); Nuwan Pradeep 2/34 (3 overs)

Kandy Falcons won by 5 wickets
Mahinda Rajapaksa International Cricket Stadium, Hambantota
Umpires: Chamara de Soysa (SL) and Prageeth Rambukwella (SL)
Player of the match: Carlos Brathwaite (Kandy Falcons)

- Galle Gladiators won the toss and elected to bat.

Match 7
11 December 2022
15:00 (N)
Scorecard

Galle Gladiators; 174/6 (20 overs)	v	Colombo Stars; 149/7 (20 overs)
Lahiru Udara 45* (30); Jeffrey Vandersay 2/31 (4 overs)		Niroshan Dickwella 58* (44); Iftikhar Ahmed 2/12 (2 overs)

Galle Gladiators won by 25 runs
Pallekele International Cricket Stadium, Kandy
Umpires: Ruchira Palliyaguruge (SL) and Chamara de Soysa (SL)
Player of the match: Lahiru Udara (Galle Gladiators)

- Galle Gladiators won the toss and elected to bat.

Match 9
12 December 2022
15:00 (D/N)
Scorecard

Galle Gladiators; 153/6 (20 overs)	v	Kandy Falcons; 141/7 (20 overs)
Thanuka Dabare 70 (51); Carlos Brathwaite 3/17 (4 overs)		Ashen Bandara 41* (30); Lakshan Sandakan 2/22 (4 overs)

Galle Gladiators won by 12 runs
Pallekele International Cricket Stadium, Kandy
Umpires: Ravindra Kottahachchi (SL) and Prageeth Rambukwella (SL)
Player of the match: Thanuka Dabare (Galle Gladiators)

- Galle Gladiators won the toss and elected to bat.

Match 12
13 December 2022
19:30 (N)
Scorecard

Galle Gladiators; 193/5 (20 overs)	v	Colombo Stars; 197/8 (20 overs)
Kusal Mendis 72 (49); Naveen-ul-Haq 2/33 (4 overs)		Dinesh Chandimal 63 (33); Nuwan Thushara 3/29 (4 overs)

Colombo Stars won by 2 wickets
Pallekele International Cricket Stadium, Kandy
Umpires: Ruchira Palliyaguruge (SL) and Prageeth Rambukwella (SL)
Player of the match: Ravi Bopara (Colombo Stars)

- Colombo Stars won the toss and elected to field.

Match 15
17 December 2022
15:00 (N)
Scorecard

Dambulla Aura; 178/5 (20 overs)	v	Galle Gladiators; 130 (19.4 overs)
Shevon Daniel 80 (55); Nuwan Pradeep 3/37 (3 overs)		Lahiru Udara 32 (32); Pramod Madushan 3/17 (2.4 overs)

Dambulla Aura won by 48 runs
R. Premadasa Stadium, Colombo
Umpires: Kumar Dharmasena (SL) and Ruchira Palliyaguruge (SL)
Player of the match: Jordan Cox (Dambulla Aura)

- Dambulla Aura won the toss and elected to bat.

Match 17
18 December 2022
15:00 (N)
Scorecard

Jaffna Kings; 170/8 (20 overs)	v	Galle Gladiators; 154/9 (20 overs)
Afif Hossain 54 (35); Wahab Riaz 3/37 (4 overs)		Kusal Mendis 58 (45); Binura Fernando 3/20 (4 overs)

Jaffna Kings won by 16 runs
R. Premadasa Stadium, Colombo
Umpires: Kumar Dharmasena (SL) and Ravindra Kottahachchi (SL)
Player of the match: Afif Hossain (Jaffna Kings)

- Jaffna Kings won the toss and elected to bat.

Match 20
19 December 2022
19:30 (D/N)
Scorecard

Galle Gladiators; 129/8 (20 overs)	v	Dambulla Aura; 134/6 (14.2 overs)
Nuwanidu Fernando 63* (42); Matthew Forde 4/11 (4 overs)		Matthew Forde 52 (30); Imad Wasim 2/32 (3.2 overs)

Dambulla Aura won by 4 wickets
R. Premadasa Stadium, Colombo
Umpires: Kumar Dharmasena (SL) and Raveendra Wimalasiri (SL)
Player of the match: Matthew Forde (Dambulla Aura)

- Galle Gladiators won the toss and elected to bat.

== Playoffs ==
=== Eliminator ===
Match 22
21 December 2022
19:30 (N)
Scorecard

Galle Gladiators; 108/9 (18 overs)	v	Colombo Stars; 109/3 (16.5 overs)
Sahan Arachchige 53 (31); Benny Howell 3/17 (2 overs)		Ravi Bopara 43* (28); Imad Wasim 1/18 (4 overs)

Colombo Stars won by 7 wickets
R. Premadasa Stadium, Colombo
Umpires: Lyndon Hannibal (SL) and Prageeth Rambukwella (SL)
Player of the match: Ravi Bopara (Colombo Stars)

- Colombo Stars won the toss and elected to field.
- The match was reduced to 18 overs per side due to rain.
