= 2017 Hong Kong Sixes =

- Dates: 28 October – 29 October
- Administrator: International Cricket Council
- Cricket format: Six-a-side
- Tournament format(s): Round-robin and Knockout
- Champions: South Africa (5th title)
- Runners-up: Pakistan
- Participants: 8
- Matches: 23
- Player of the series: (Hong Kong) Nizakat Khan
- Most runs: (Hong Kong) Nizakat Khan (192)
- Most wickets: (Hong Kong) Ehsan Khan (South Africa) Sarel Erwee (South Africa) Corné Dry (6)
- Official website: Official website

The 2017 Hong Kong Cricket Sixes was the nineteenth edition of the Hong Kong Cricket Sixes. It took place at Kowloon Cricket Club in Hong Kong. Eight teams competing in the tournament which lasted over two days from 28 to 29 October 2017. The previous tournament was won by South Africa who defeated Pakistan in the final.

== Squads ==
Pool A
Hong Kong	M. C. C.	Pakistan	South Africa
Babar Hayat (c); Nizakat Khan; Aizaz Khan; Ehsan Khan; Ehsan Nawaz; Jamie Atkinson; Tanveer Ahmed	Samit Patel (c); Jordan Clark; Gareth Berg; Darren Stevens; John Simpson; Rikki Clark; Ryan Higgins	Sohail Tanvir (c); Anwar Ali; Gauhar Ali; Hammad Azam; Sahibzada Farhan; Sohail Khan; Mohammad Sami	Sarel Erwee (c); Aubrey Swanepoel; Corne Dry; Jerry Nqolo; Somila Seyibokwe; Ferisco Adams; Farhaan Sayanvala
Pool B
Australia	Bangladesh	New Zealand	Sri Lanka
John Hastings (c); Ben Laughlin; Arjun Nair; Nathan Reardon; Alex Gregory; Matthew Short; Seb Gotch	Saif Hassan (c); Afif Hossain; Mahidul Islam Ankon; Monirul Islam; Robiul Haque; Qazi Onik Islam; Damien Wright	Peter Fulton (c); Shanan Stewart; Roneel Hira; Brad Cachopa; Graeme Beghin; Ell Herd; Steve Wilkins	Farveez Maharoof (c); Andy Solomons; Tillakaratne Sampath; Angelo Perera; Bhanuka Rajapaksa; Ramith Rambukwella; Jeevan Mendis

== Rules and regulations ==
All standard laws of the game as laid down by the M. C. C. applied with the following significant differences:

=== General ===
Games are played between two teams of six players, and consist of five overs of six balls, with the exception of the final which consists of five overs of eight balls. Each member of the fielding side, with the exception of the wicket-keeper shall bowl one over. Wides and no-balls count as two runs to the batting side, plus an extra ball.

=== Last man stands ===
If five wickets fall (not including batsmen retiring not out) before the allocated overs have been completed, the remaining batsman continues, with the last batsman out remaining as a runner. The not out batsman shall always face strike, and shall be declared out if his partner is declared out.

=== Batsman retire ===
A batsman must retire not out on reaching 31 runs, but not before. He may complete all runs scored on the ball on which he reaches his 31, and retire immediately after. If one of the last pair of batsmen is out, any remaining not out batsman may resume his innings. In the case where there is more than one, they must return in the order they retired.

== Group Stage results ==
=== Pool A ===
Pld	Pld	W	L	NRR	Pts
Pakistan	3	3	0	3.40	6
South Africa	3	2	1	3.23	4
Hong Kong	3	1	2	2.84	2
M.C.C	3	0	3	3.06	0

28 October
08:00

Hong Kong; 5/95 (5 overs)	v	South Africa; 1/96 (4.4 overs)
Babar Hayat 35 (10); Corne Dry 2/18 (1 over)		Sarel Erwee 35* (12); Ehsan Nawaz 1/26 (1 over)

South Africa won by 5 wickets
Kowloon Cricket Club, Hong Kong

28 October
09:30

Pakistan; 2/92 (5 overs)	v	Hong Kong; 1/66 (5 overs)
Hammad Azam 26 (7); Aizaz Khan 2/20 (1 over)		Nizakat Khan 31* (10); Mohammad Sami 1/10 (1 over)

Pakistan won by 26 runs
Kowloon Cricket Club, Hong Kong

28 October
11:00

South Africa; 2/115 (5 overs)	v	M.C.C; 3/99 (5 overs)
Ferisco Adams 35* (7); Gareth Berg 2/8 (1 over)		Rikki Clarke 44* (12); Sarel Erwee 2/17 (1 over)

South Africa won by 16 runs
Kowloon Cricket Club, Hong Kong

28 October
12:30

M.C.C; 94 (5 overs)	v	Hong Kong; 2/96 (4.3 overs)
Samit Patel 27 (8); Ehsan Khan 3/5 (1 over)		Nizakat Khan 34* (7); Rikki Clarke 1/12 (1 over)

Hong Kong won by 4 wickets
Kowloon Cricket Club, Hong Kong

28 October
14:00

South Africa; 74 (5 overs)	v	Pakistan; 2/78 (3.3 overs)
Ferisco Adams 32 (11); Mohammad Sami 1/10 (1 over)		Hammad Azam 36* (10); Corné Dry 1/11 (1 over)

Pakistan won by 4 wickets
Kowloon Cricket Club, Hong Kong

28 October
15:30

M.C.C; 83 (5 overs)	v	Pakistan; 2/85 (4 overs)
Darren Stevens 31* (12); Hammad Azam 2/15 (1 over)		Sahibzada Farhan 36* (7); Darren Stevens 1/12 (1 over)

Pakistan won by 4 wickets
Kowloon Cricket Club, Hong Kong

=== Pool B ===
Team	Pld	W	L	NRR	Pts
New Zealand	3	2	1	3.31	4
Bangladesh	3	2	1	2.92	4
Australia	3	1	2	3.31	2
Sri Lanka	3	1	2	3.27	2

28 October
08:45

Bangladesh; 5/93 (5 overs)	v	Sri Lanka; 3/86 (5 overs)
Saif Hassan 46* (12); Farveez Maharoof 1/8 (1 over)		Bhanuka Rajapaksa 31* (13); Saif Hassan 1/14 (1 over)

Bangladesh won by 7 runs
Kowloon Cricket Club, Hong Kong

28 October
10:15

Sri Lanka; 2/114 (5 overs)	v	Australia; 3/98 (5 overs)
Jeevan Mendis 33* (7); Arjun Nair 2/8 (1 over)		John Hastings 31* (7); Ramith Rambukwella 2/14 (1 over)

Sri lanka won by 16 runs
Kowloon Cricket Club, Hong Kong

28 October
11:45

Bangladesh; 3/82 (5 overs)	v	New Zealand; 3/83 (4 overs)
Mahidul Islam Ankon 32* (9); Shanan Stewart 1/3 (1 over)		Bradley Cachopa 31* (6); Abul Hasan 1/9 (1 over)

New Zealand won by 3 wickets
Kowloon Cricket Club, Hong Kong

28 October
13:15

Sri Lanka; 3/95 (5 overs)	v	New Zealand; 3/98 (4.4 overs)
Bhanuka Rajapaksa 31* (8); Shanan Stewart 2/13 (1 over)		Graeme Beghin 31* (8); Angelo Perera 1/11 (0.4 overs)

New Zealand won by 3 wickets
Kowloon Cricket Club, Hong Kong

28 October
14:45

Bangladesh; 1/88 (5 overs)	v	Australia; 1/82 (5 overs)
Afif Hossain 34* (11); Nathan Reardon 1/16 (1 over)		John Hastings 32* (10)

Bangladesh won by 6 Runs
Kowloon Cricket Club, Hong Kong

28 October
16:15

New Zealand; 3/91 (5 overs)	v	Australia; 0/95 (3.5 overs)
Graeme Beghin 31* (9); Alex Gregory 2/8 (1 over)		Matthew Short 36* (7)

Australia won by 6 wickets
Kowloon Cricket Club, Hong Kong

== Qualifying finals ==
The quarter finals were decided based on overall standings. 1st v 8th, 2nd v 7th, 3rd v 6th and 4th v 5th.

29 October
8:45

Pakistan; 2/112 (5 overs)	v	M.C.C; 1/95 (5 overs)
Sohail Tanvir 35* (8); Gareth Berg 1/11 (1 over)		Darren Stevens 36* (10); Sohail Khan 1/23 (1 over)

Pakistan won by 17 runs
Kowloon Cricket Club, Hong Kong

- M.C.C won the toss and elected to bowl

29 October
9:30

Hong Kong; 3/104 (5 overs)	v	New Zealand; 3/87 (5 overs)
Nizakat Khan 54* (13); Shanan Stewart 2/14 (1 over)		Graeme Beghin 35* (11); Ehsan Khan 1/13 (1 over)

Hong Kong won by 17 runs
Kowloon Cricket Club, Hong Kong

- New Zealand won the toss and elected to bowl

29 October
10:15

Sri Lanka; 4/95 (5 overs)	v	South Africa; 2/96 (4.4 overs)
Ramith Rambukwella 31* (11); Aubrey Swanepoel 2/13 (1 over)		Jerry Nqolo 34* (13); Andy Solomons 2/9 (1 over)

South Africa won by 4 wickets
Kowloon Cricket Club, Hong Kong

- Sri Lanka won the toss and elected to bat

29 October
11:00

Bangladesh; 5/84 (5 overs)	v	Australia; 1/90 (4.2 overs)
Mahidul Islam Ankon 30 (8); John Hastings 1/16 (1 over)		Matthew Short 31* (8); Monirul Islam 1/21 (1 over)

Australia won by 5 wickets
Kowloon Cricket Club, Hong Kong

- Australia won the toss and elected to bowl

== Plate finals ==
The plate finals were played between the teams that finish 5th, 6th, 7th and 8th overall.

=== Semi-finals ===
29 October
12:30

Hong Kong; 1/114 (5 overs)	v	Sri Lanka; 4/81 (5 overs)

Hong Kong won by 33 runs
Kowloon Cricket Club, Hong Kong

29 October
14:00

Bangladesh; 2/73 (5 overs)	v	M.C.C; 1/74 (5 overs)

M.C.C won by 5 wickets
Kowloon Cricket Club, Hong Kong

=== Plate final ===
29 October
15:30

Hong Kong; 1/116 (4.2 overs)	v	M.C.C; 1/113 (5 overs)

Hong Kong won by 4 wickets
Kowloon Cricket Club, Hong Kong

== Cup finals ==
The cup finals decided the winners of the tournament and were played between the teams that finish 1st, 2nd, 3rd and 4th overall. The cup final was played with 8 ball overs.

=== Semi-finals ===
29 October
11:45

South Africa; 1/115 (5 overs)	v	New Zealand; 3/97 (5 overs)

South Africa won by 18 runs
Kowloon Cricket Club, Hong Kong

29 October
13:15

Pakistan; 2/115 (5 overs)	v	Australia; 3/80 (5 overs)

Pakistan won by 35 runs
Kowloon Cricket Club, Hong Kong

=== Third-place playoff ===
29 October
14:45

New Zealand; 0/124 (5 overs)	v	Australia; 1/118 (5 overs)

New Zealand won by 6 runs
Kowloon Cricket Club, Hong Kong

=== Cup final ===
29 October
16:15
Scorecard

Pakistan; 123 (4.5 overs)	v	South Africa; 4/124 (5 overs)

South Africa won by 2 wickets
Kowloon Cricket Club, Hong Kong

- South Africa won the toss and elected to field
- South Africa jointly became the most successful nation in Hong Kong Sixes tournament with winning the 5th title

== Women's exhibition match ==
29 October
14:45

Hong Kong Dragons; 2/68 (5 overs)	v	Hong Kong; 35 (5 overs)

Hong Kong Dragons won by 33 runs
Kowloon Cricket Club, Hong Kong
