= South African cricket team in Sri Lanka in 2021–22 =

International cricket tour

	Sri Lanka	South Africa
- Dates: 2 – 14 September 2021
Captains	Dasun Shanaka	Temba Bavuma (ODIs) (Note: Keshav Maharaj captained South Africa for the second and third ODIs.); Keshav Maharaj (T20Is)

One Day International series
- Results: Sri Lanka won the 3-match series 2–1
Most runs	Charith Asalanka (196)	Janneman Malan (162)
Most wickets	Dushmantha Chameera (4); Wanindu Hasaranga (4); Maheesh Theekshana (4)	Tabraiz Shamsi (8)
- Player of the series: Charith Asalanka (SL)

Twenty20 International series
- Results: South Africa won the 3-match series 3–0
Most runs	Dinesh Chandimal (71)	Quinton de Kock (153)
Most wickets	Wanindu Hasaranga (3)	Bjorn Fortuin (5)
- Player of the series: Quinton de Kock (SA)

The South Africa cricket team toured Sri Lanka in September 2021 to play three One Day International (ODI) and three Twenty20 International (T20I) matches. The ODI series formed part of the inaugural 2020–2023 ICC Cricket World Cup Super League.

The tour was originally scheduled for June 2020 but the COVID-19 pandemic put the tour in doubt, with Ashley de Silva, CEO of Sri Lanka Cricket and Graeme Smith, acting director of Cricket South Africa, both stating that the teams would need plenty of time to train. On 20 April 2020, both cricket boards confirmed that the tour had been postponed due to the pandemic. On 1 August 2020, Graeme Smith confirmed that the tour had been postponed indefinitely, due to scheduling clashes with the 2020 Caribbean Premier League and the 2020 Indian Premier League.

On 30 July 2021, Cricket South Africa confirmed the tour, with all the matches taking place at the R. Premadasa Stadium in a bio-secure bubble. Sri Lanka won the first ODI match by 14 runs. South Africa then won the rain-affected second ODI match by 67 runs to level the series. Sri Lanka won the third ODI by 78 runs to win the series 2–1. South Africa won the first two T20I matches to win the series with a match to spare. South Africa won the third and final T20I by ten wickets to win the series 3–0.

== Squads ==
Sri Lanka	South Africa	
ODIs and T20Is	ODIs	T20Is
Dasun Shanaka (c); Dhananjaya de Silva (vc); Charith Asalanka; Minod Bhanuka (wk); Dushmantha Chameera; Dinesh Chandimal (wk); Akila Dananjaya; Avishka Fernando; Binura Fernando; Wanindu Hasaranga; Praveen Jayawickrama; Chamika Karunaratne; Lahiru Kumara; Lahiru Madushanka; Kamindu Mendis; Ramesh Mendis; Pathum Nissanka; Kusal Perera (wk); Nuwan Pradeep; Bhanuka Rajapaksa; Pulina Tharanga; Maheesh Theekshana	Temba Bavuma (c); ~~Junior Dala~~; Beuran Hendricks; Reeza Hendricks; Heinrich Klaasen (wk); George Linde; Janneman Malan; Aiden Markram; Keshav Maharaj; Wiaan Mulder; Anrich Nortje; Andile Phehlukwayo; Dwaine Pretorius; Kagiso Rabada; Tabraiz Shamsi; Lutho Sipamla; Rassie van der Dussen; Kyle Verreynne; Lizaad Williams	Keshav Maharaj (c); ~~Temba Bavuma (c)~~; Quinton de Kock (wk); Bjorn Fortuin; Beuran Hendricks; Reeza Hendricks; Heinrich Klaasen; George Linde; Sisanda Magala; Aiden Markram; David Miller; Wiaan Mulder; Lungi Ngidi; Anrich Nortje; Dwaine Pretorius; Kagiso Rabada; Tabraiz Shamsi; Rassie van der Dussen; Lizaad Williams

On 22 August 2021, Sri Lanka Cricket named a preliminary 30-man squad for the tour, with Dasun Shanaka retaining his captaincy. Sri Lanka did not name individual squads for the ODI and T20I matches, opting instead to name a combined squad of 22 players for the tour.

Junior Dala was ruled out of South Africa's ODI squad after a positive COVID-19 test with Lutho Sipamla named as his replacement. South Africa's captain Temba Bavuma was ruled out the rest of the series, after suffering a fractured thumb in the first ODI. Keshav Maharaj was named as the captain of South Africa for the second and third ODIs.

== ODI series ==
=== 1st ODI ===
2 September 2021
14:30 (D/N)
Scorecard

Sri Lanka; 300/9 (50 overs)	v	South Africa; 286/6 (50 overs)
Avishka Fernando 118 (115); Keshav Maharaj 2/30 (10 overs)		Aiden Markram 96 (90); Akila Dananjaya 2/65 (10 overs)

Sri Lanka won by 14 runs
R. Premadasa Stadium, Colombo
Umpires: Kumar Dharmasena (SL) and Ruchira Palliyaguruge (SL)
Player of the match: Avishka Fernando (SL)

- Sri Lanka won the toss and elected to bat.
- World Cup Super League points: Sri Lanka 10, South Africa 0.

=== 2nd ODI ===
4 September 2021
14:30 (D/N)
Scorecard

South Africa; 283/6 (47 overs)	v	Sri Lanka; 197 (36.4 overs)
Janneman Malan 121 (135); Chamika Karunaratne 2/24 (5 overs)		Charith Asalanka 77 (69); Tabraiz Shamsi 5/49 (7.4 overs)

South Africa won by 67 runs (DLS method)
R. Premadasa Stadium, Colombo
Umpires: Kumar Dharmasena (SL) and Raveendra Wimalasiri (SL)
Player of the match: Janneman Malan (SA)

- South Africa won the toss and elected to bat.
- Sri Lanka were set a revised target of 265 runs from 41 overs due to rain.
- George Linde (SA) made his ODI debut.
- Keshav Maharaj captained South Africa for the first time in ODIs.
- Tabraiz Shamsi (SA) took his first five-wicket haul in ODIs.
- World Cup Super League points: South Africa 10, Sri Lanka 0.

=== 3rd ODI ===
7 September 2021
14:30 (D/N)
Scorecard

Sri Lanka; 203/9 (50 overs)	v	South Africa; 125 (30 overs)
Charith Asalanka 47 (31); Keshav Maharaj 3/38 (10 overs)		Heinrich Klaasen 22 (30); Maheesh Theekshana 4/37 (10 overs)

Sri Lanka won by 78 runs
R. Premadasa Stadium, Colombo
Umpires: Kumar Dharmasena (SL) and Lyndon Hannibal (SL)
Player of the match: Dushmantha Chameera (SL)

- Sri Lanka won the toss and elected to bat.
- Maheesh Theekshana (SL) made his ODI debut and took a wicket with his first ball in ODIs.
- World Cup Super League points: Sri Lanka 10, South Africa 0.

== T20I series ==
=== 1st T20I ===
10 September 2021
20:00 (N)
Scorecard

South Africa; 163/5 (20 overs)	v	Sri Lanka; 135/6 (20 overs)
Aiden Markram 48 (33); Wanindu Hasaranga 2/23 (4 overs)		Dinesh Chandimal 66* (54); Keshav Maharaj 1/19 (4 overs)

South Africa won by 28 runs
R. Premadasa Stadium, Colombo
Umpires: Kumar Dharmasena (SL) and Prageeth Rambukwella (SL)
Player of the match: Aiden Markram (SA)

- South Africa won the toss and elected to bat.
- Maheesh Theekshana (SL) and Keshav Maharaj (SA) both made their T20I debuts.
- Keshav Maharaj captained South Africa for the first time in T20Is, and took a wicket with his first ball in T20Is.

=== 2nd T20I ===
12 September 2021
20:00 (N)
Scorecard

Sri Lanka; 103 (18.1 overs)	v	South Africa; 105/1 (14.1 overs)
Kusal Perera 30 (25); Tabraiz Shamsi 3/20 (4 overs)		Quinton de Kock 58* (48); Wanindu Hasaranga 1/22 (4 overs)

South Africa won by 9 wickets
R. Premadasa Stadium, Colombo
Umpires: Ruchira Palliyaguruge (SL) and Raveendra Wimalasiri (SL)
Player of the match: Tabraiz Shamsi (SA)

- Sri Lanka won the toss and elected to bat.
- Praveen Jayawickrama (SL) made his T20I debut.

=== 3rd T20I ===
14 September 2021
20:00 (N)
Scorecard

Sri Lanka; 120/8 (20 overs)	v	South Africa; 121/0 (14.4 overs)
Kusal Perera 39 (33); Bjorn Fortuin 2/21 (4 overs)		Quinton de Kock 59* (46)

South Africa won by 10 wickets
R. Premadasa Stadium, Colombo
Umpires: Kumar Dharmasena (SL) and Ruchira Palliyaguruge (SL)
Player of the match: Quinton de Kock (SA)

- Sri Lanka won the toss and elected to bat.

== Statistics ==
=== Most runs (ODI) ===
Rank	Runs	Player	Teams	Innings	Average	High Score	100	50
1	196	Charith Asalanka	(Sri Lanka)	3	65.33	77	-	2
2	162	Janneman Malan	(South Africa)	3	54.00	121	1	-
3	136	Avishka Fernando	(Sri Lanka)	3	45.33	118	1	-
4	119	Aiden Markram	(South Africa)	3	39.66	96	0	1
5	101	Heinrich Klassen	(South Africa)	3	33.66	43	0	-
Last Updated: 1 October 2021

=== Most wickets (ODI) ===
Rank	Wickets	Player	Teams	Innings	Best	Average	Economy
1	8	Tabraiz Shamsi	(South Africa)	3	5/49	16.87	4.87
2	6	Keshav Maharaj	(South Africa)	3	3/38	16.66	3.57
3	4	Maheesh Theekshana	(Sri Lanka)	1	4/37	9.25	3.70
3	4	Wanindu Hasaranga	(Sri Lanka)	3	2/32	36.75	5.25
3	4	Dushmantha Chameera	(Sri Lanka)	3	2/16	30.75	6.83
3	4	Kagiso Rabada	(South Africa)	3	2/16	32.00	5.56
4	3	George Linde	(South Africa)	2	2/32	24.00	4.80
4	3	Chamika Karunaratne	(Sri Lanka)	2	2/24	14.00	5.25
Last Updated: 1 October 2021

=== Most runs (T20I) ===
Rank	Runs	Player	Teams	Innings	Average	High Score	Strike Rate	50
1	153	Quinton de Kock	(South Africa)	3	153.00	59*	121.42	2
2	112	Reeza Hendricks	(South Africa)	3	56.00	56*	123.07	1
3	71	Dinesh Chandimal	(Sri Lanka)	2	71.00	66*	114.51	1
4	69	Aiden Markram	(South Africa)	2	69.00	48	132.69	0
4	69	Kusal Perera	(Sri Lanka)	2	34.50	39	118.96	0
5	54	Chamika Karunaratne	(Sri Lanka)	3	54.00	24*	120.00	0
Last Updated: 1 October 2021

=== Most wickets (T20I) ===
Rank	Wickets	Player	Teams	Innings	Best	Average	Economy
1	5	Bjorn Fortuin	(South Africa)	3	2/12	11.40	4.75
2	4	Aiden Markram	(South Africa)	2	3/21	6.25	4.16
2	4	Tabraiz Shamsi	(South Africa)	3	3/20	16.75	6.70
3	3	Keshav Maharaj	(South Africa)	3	1/10	14.33	4.25
3	3	Wanindu Hasaranga	(Sri Lanka)	3	2/23	26.66	6.66
4	2	Anrich Nortje	(South Africa)	2	1/8	18.50	6.16
4	2	Kagiso Rabada	(South Africa)	3	2/23	36.50	9.12
Last Updated: 1 October 2021

West Indian cricket team in Sri Lanka in 2021–22
