= SLC Invitational T20 League =

Sri Lanka Cricket Tournament

- Countries: Sri Lanka
- Administrator: Sri Lanka Cricket
- Format: Twenty20
- First edition: 2021
- Latest edition: 2025
- Tournament format: Group stage and knockout
- Number of teams: 4
- Current champion: SLC Greens (1st title)

The SLC Invitational T20 League or Dialog Invitational T20 League (for sponsors) was a Twenty20 cricket tournament that took place in Sri Lanka The competition was established by the Sri Lanka Cricket (SLC) in 2021. It is the top-level Twenty20 competition in Sri Lanka.

== Winners ==
Season	Winner	Runner-up
2021	SLC Greys	SLC Reds
2022	SLC Reds	SLC Blues
2025	SLC Greens	SLC Greys
