= Lakshan Gamage =

Sri Lankan cricketer

Personal information
- Full name: Kavishka Lakshan Gamage
- Born: 9 January 2001 (age 25)
- Batting: Left-handed
- Bowling: Right arm medium
- Role: bowler

Domestic team information
- Years: Team
- 2022: Galle Gladiators
- 2022: Sri Lanka Army Sports Club
- 2023–present: Burgher Recreation Club
- Source: Cricinfo, 1 December 2024

Kavishka Lakshan Gamage (born 9 January 2001) is a Sri Lankan cricketer.

== Career ==
He made his T20 debut playing for Sri Lanka Army Sports Club against Sri Lanka Navy Sports Club on 22 May 2022 during the Major Clubs T20 Tournament.

He made his List A debut playing for Sri Lanka Army Sports Club against Kurunegala Youth Cricket Club on 27 June 2022 at the Major Clubs Limited Over Tournament.

In July 2022, he was bought by Galle Gladiators in the LPL auction ahead of the 2022 Lanka Premier League. In July 2022, he was named in the SLC Greys team for the 2022 SLC Invitational T20 League tournament.

In May 2023, he was named in Sri Lanka Emerging XI for their five-match home bilateral T20 series against Japan which was held at Sano International Cricket Ground, as warmup preparations for Japan ahead of their 2023 ICC Men's T20 World Cup EAP Final.

He made his first-class debut playing for Burgher Recreation Club against Ragama Cricket Club on 23 June 2023 during the Major League Tournament. He was named in Dambulla squad for the 2024 National Super League 4-Day Tournament.
