= Jahangir Alam (cricketer, born 1973) =

Bangladeshi cricketer (born 1973)

Personal information
- Born: March 5, 1973 (age 53); Narayanganj, Dhaka, Bangladesh
- Batting: Right-handed
- Relatives: Sohel Hossain (brother); Jishan Alam (son)

International information
- National side: Bangladesh
- ODI debut (cap 35): 10 October 1997 v Kenya
- Last ODI: 21 March 1999 v Zimbabwe
- Source: , 13 February 2006

Jahangir Alam (born 5 March 1973) is a Bangladeshi former cricketer who played in three One Day Internationals from 1997 to 1999. Jahangir was an opening batsman who could keep wickets if necessary. Though enormously successful in domestic arena, he failed to perform up to expectation at the international level.

== Early days ==
Jahangir was born in 1973 at Narayanganj, Dhaka. He first came into prominence during the under-19 tour of England in the summer of 1989. He started the tour with a hundred and continued to score consistently after that. His 132 against Wycombe was the highest score in the tour. In the process he shared a 210 run opening partnership with Javed Omar. Jahangir Alam scored 35 against Homestead and 40 against Wakeham Overall in five matches he scored 219 runs at an average of 43.80. In contrast, he was a big failure in the Asian under-19 Cup in Dec. 1989. His highest score of 38 in 4 matches came against Sri Lanka at Chittagong.

== In ICC Trophy ==
Apart from this, his most successful time in international cricket came during the 1994 ICC Trophy in Kenya. His century, scoring 177 not out, against the eventual champions UAE was the only bright point for his team, in what was a miserable campaign for them. Jahangir followed his hundred with 48 against The Netherlands and 57 against Kenya. He finished with 283 runs at an average of 47.16 runs per innings. He was also a member of the Bangladesh team that won the ICC Trophy in 1997. However, he played in only one of the matches (against the hosts Malaysia, in the Group stages).
