= Jeremy Solozano =

West Indian cricketer (born 1995)

Personal information
- Born: 5 October 1995 (age 31); Arima, Trinidad
- Batting: Left-handed
- Bowling: Slow left-arm orthodox
- Role: Batter

International information
- National side: West Indies
- Only Test (cap 327): 21 November 2021 v Sri Lanka

Domestic team information
- Years: Team
- 2013-present: Trinidad and Tobago

Career statistics
Competition	First-class	List A
Matches	40	10
Runs scored	1,686	312
Batting average	23.41	39.00
100s/50s	2/8	1/0
Top score	110	102*
Balls bowled	12	–
Wickets	0	–
Bowling average	–	–
5 wickets in innings	–	–
10 wickets in match	–	–
Best bowling	–	–
Catches/stumpings	20/–	5/–
- Source: Cricinfo, 21 November 2021

Jeremy Solozano (born 5 October 1995) is a West Indian cricketer. He was part of the West Indies' squad for the 2014 ICC Under-19 Cricket World Cup. In May 2018, he was selected to play for the Trinidad and Tobago national cricket team in the Professional Cricket League draft, ahead of the 2018–19 season. In November 2019, he was named in Trinidad and Tobago's squad for the 2019–20 Regional Super50 tournament.

In November 2021, Solozano was named in the West Indies' Test squad for their series against Sri Lanka. He made his Test debut on 21 November 2021, for the West Indies against Sri Lanka. However, Solozano was stretchered off the field in the first session of the match, after being hit on the head while fielding.
