= Sohel Hossain =

Bangladeshi cricketer (born 1979)

Personal information
- Full name: Sohel Hossain
- Born: 27 August 1979 (age 47); Narayanganj, Dhaka, Bangladesh
- Batting: Right-handed
- Bowling: Right-arm
- Relatives: Jahangir Alam (brother); Jishan Alam (Nephew)
- Source: ESPNcricinfo, 29 August 2020

Sohel Hossain (born 27 August 1979) is a Bangladeshi first-class cricketer who played for Dhaka Division.
