= Monirul Islam (cricketer) =

Bangladeshi cricketer (born 1980)

Personal information
- Born: 25 August 1980 (age 46); Khulna, Bangladesh
- Nickname: Taj
- Batting: Right-handed
- Bowling: Slow left arm orthodox

Domestic team information
- Years: Team
- 2001/02–2006/07: Khulna Division
- First-class debut: 2 January 2002 Khulna Division v Sylhet Division
- Last First-class: 9 November 2008 Khulna Division v Rajshahi Division
- List A debut: 19 January 2002 Khulna Division v Sylhet Division
- Last List A: 8 January 2008 Khulna Division v Barisal Division

Career statistics
Competition	FC	LA
Matches	30	29
Runs scored	1292	455
Batting average	25.33	20.68
100s/50s	1/5	–/2
Top score	118*	87
Balls bowled	354	132
Wickets	3	4
Bowling average	59.66	32.50
5 wickets in innings	–	–
10 wickets in match	–	–
Best bowling	2/29	1/9
Catches/stumpings	17/–	11/–
- Source: CricketArchive, 11 December 2016

Monirul Islam is a first-class and List A cricketer from Bangladesh. He was born on 25 August 1980 in Khulna, Bangladesh and is a right-handed batsman and slow left arm orthodox spin bowler. He is sometimes known by his nickname "Taj". He made his first-class debut for Khulna Division in 2001/02 and played through the 2006/07 season.

He has made one first-class hundred, an unbeaten 118 against Dhaka Division, and five first-class fifties. His best bowling, 2 for 78, also came against Dhaka Division. He has scored two fifties in List A one-day games. He is a coach at Sheikh Jamal Cricket Academy.
