= West Indian cricket team in Sri Lanka in 2021–22 =

International cricket tour

	Sri Lanka	West Indies
- Dates: 21 November – 3 December 2021
Captains	Dimuth Karunaratne	Kraigg Brathwaite

Test series
- Result: Sri Lanka won the 2-match series 2–0
Most runs	Dimuth Karunaratne (278)	Nkrumah Bonner (148)
Most wickets	Ramesh Mendis (18)	Jomel Warrican (9)
- Player of the series: Ramesh Mendis (SL)

The West Indies cricket team toured Sri Lanka in November and December 2021 to play two Test matches. Originally scheduled to be played in October and November 2022, the tour was brought forward to be played after the 2021 ICC Men's T20 World Cup. The Test matches formed part of the 2021–2023 ICC World Test Championship. Ahead of the Test matches, the West Indies were scheduled to play a four-day warm-up game in Colombo. However, the match was abandoned without a ball being bowled due to rain.

In the first Test, the West Indies were set a target of 348 runs to win the match, but were reduced to 52 for 6 at the end of day four. Despite batting past the lunch break on the fifth day of the Test, the West Indies were bowled out for 160 runs, with Sri Lanka winning the match by 187 runs. Shortly after the fall of the last wicket, heavy rain fell at the ground. In the second Test, the West Indies were 65/2 at lunch on the final day, needing 232 more runs to win. However, they lost their last eight wickets for 40 runs, to be bowled out for 130. Sri Lanka won the match by 164 runs, winning the series 2–0.

== Squads ==
Tests
Sri Lanka	West Indies
Dimuth Karunaratne (c); Charith Asalanka; Minod Bhanuka (wk); Dushmantha Chameera; Dinesh Chandimal (wk); Dhananjaya de Silva; Lasith Embuldeniya; Asitha Fernando; Oshada Fernando; Vishwa Fernando; Chamika Gunasekara; Praveen Jayawickrama; Chamika Karunaratne; Lahiru Kumara; Suranga Lakmal; Suminda Lakshan; Angelo Mathews; Ramesh Mendis; Kamil Mishara; Pathum Nissanka; Lakshan Sandakan; Roshen Silva	Kraigg Brathwaite (c); Jermaine Blackwood (vc); Nkrumah Bonner; Roston Chase; Rahkeem Cornwall; Joshua Da Silva (wk); Shannon Gabriel; Jason Holder; Shai Hope; Kyle Mayers; Veerasammy Permaul; Kemar Roach; Jayden Seales; Jeremy Solozano; Jomel Warrican

Ahead of the second Test, Dushmantha Chameera, Asitha Fernando, Suminda Lakshan, Kamil Mishara and Roshen Silva were all released from the squad by the Sri Lankan selectors.

== Tour match ==
14–17 November 2021
Scorecard

Sri Lanka President's XI	v	West Indies

Match abandoned
Singhalese Sports Club Cricket Ground, Colombo
Umpires: Prageeth Rambukwella (SL) and Raveendra Wimalasiri (SL)

- No toss.
- No play was possible due to rain.

== Test series ==
=== 1st Test ===
21–25 November 2021
Scorecard

Sri Lanka	v	West Indies
386 (133.5 overs); Dimuth Karunaratne 147 (300); Roston Chase 5/83 (28.5 overs)		230 (85.5 overs); Kyle Mayers 45 (62); Praveen Jayawickrama 4/40 (19.5 overs)
191/4d (40.5 overs); Dimuth Karunaratne 83 (104); Jomel Warrican 2/42 (9 overs)		160 (79 overs); Nkrumah Bonner 68* (220); Lasith Embuldeniya 5/46 (29 overs)

Sri Lanka won by 187 runs
Galle International Stadium, Galle
Umpires: Kumar Dharmasena (SL) and Ruchira Palliyaguruge (SL)
Player of the match: Dimuth Karunaratne (SL)

- Sri Lanka won the toss and elected to bat.
- Only 38 overs of play was possible on day 3 due to rain.
- Jeremy Solozano (WI) made his Test debut.
- Shai Hope replaced Jeremy Solozano as a concussion substitute for the West Indies.
- World Test Championship points: Sri Lanka 12, West Indies 0.

=== 2nd Test ===
29 November – 3 December 2021
Scorecard

Sri Lanka	v	West Indies
204 (61.3 overs); Pathum Nissanka 73 (148); Veerasammy Permaul 5/35 (13 overs)		253 (104.2 overs); Kraigg Brathwaite 72 (185); Ramesh Mendis 6/70 (34.2 overs)
345/9d (121.4 overs); Dhananjaya de Silva 155* (262); Veerasammy Permaul 3/106 (40 overs)		132 (56.1 overs); Nkrumah Bonner 44 (143); Lasith Embuldeniya 5/35 (20.1 overs)

Sri Lanka won by 164 runs
Galle International Stadium, Galle
Umpires: Kumar Dharmasena (SL) and Ruchira Palliyaguruge (SL)
Player of the match: Dhananjaya de Silva (SL)

- Sri Lanka won the toss and elected to bat.
- Only 34.4 overs and 56.3 overs of play were possible on day 1 and day 2 respectively due to rain.
- Charith Asalanka (SL) made his Test debut.
- Veerasammy Permaul (WI) took his first five-wicket haul in Tests.
- Ramesh Mendis (SL) took his first five-wicket haul in Tests.
- World Test Championship points: Sri Lanka 12, West Indies 0.
