= Graeme Beghin =

South African cricketer (born 1989)

Personal information
- Born: 10 December 1989 (age 36)
- Source: Cricinfo, 27 January 2018

Graeme Beghin (born 10 December 1989) is a South African cricketer. He made his List A debut for Auckland in the 2017–18 Ford Trophy on 27 January 2018. In September 2018, he was named in the Auckland Aces' squad for the 2018 Abu Dhabi T20 Trophy. He made his Twenty20 debut for the Auckland Aces in the 2018 Abu Dhabi T20 Trophy on 4 October 2018.

He made his first-class debut for Auckland in the 2018–19 Plunket Shield season on 10 October 2018. In March 2019, in the final round of the tournament, he scored his maiden century in first-class cricket. In June 2020, he was offered a contract by Auckland ahead of the 2020–21 domestic cricket season.
