= Kugathas Mathulan =

Sri Lankan cricketer (born 2007)

Personal information
- Born: 3 May 2007 (age 19); Jaffna
- Batting: Right-handed
- Bowling: Right arm medium fast
- Role: bowler

Domestic team information
- Years: Team
- 2026–present: Jaffna Kings

Career statistics
Competition	List A
Matches	5
Runs scored	-
Batting average	–
100s/50s	0/0
Top score	0*
Balls bowled	186
Wickets	8
Bowling average	30.37
5 wickets in innings	0
10 wickets in match	0
Best bowling	3/38
Catches/stumpings	1/–
- Source: Cricinfo, 29 July 2026

Kugathas Mathulan also spelt as Kugadas Mathulan (born 3 May 2007) is a Sri Lankan cricketer.

== Career ==
He began his career as a fast bowler during his schooling days. He grabbed the spotlight in cricketing circles for his way of delivering yorkers with a slingy action. His slingy action had an uncanny resemblance to that of fellow Sri Lankan fast bowlers Lasith Malinga and Matheesha Pathirana. In 2024, he represented his school St. John's College, Jaffna in the 117th Battle of the North Big Match against Jaffna Central College and during that match he was spotted bowling yorkers with the slingy action. He eventually joined Chennai Super Kings as a net bowler ahead of the 2024 Indian Premier League season.

He was included in Sri Lanka under-19 team for the 2024 ACC Under-19 Asia Cup. In January 2026, he was named in Sri Lanka's squad for the 2026 ICC Under-19 Cricket World Cup. He made his List A debut playing for Sri Lanka A against Afghanistan A on 13 June 2026 during the 2026 Sri Lanka Tri-Nation Series.
