= John Prakash =

Malaysian cricketer (born 1974)

Personal information
- Born: 20 November 1974 (age 51); Seremban, Negeri Sembilan, Malaysia
- Batting: Right-handed
- Source: CricketArchive, 18 January 2008

John Prakash (born 20 November 1974) is a Malaysian cricketer. A right-handed batsman, he played for the Malaysia national cricket team between 1994 and 1998.

== Biography ==
Born in Seremban in 1974, John Prakash made his debut for Malaysia in the 1994 Saudara Cup match against Singapore. He did not play for the national side in 1995, returning for two matches in the Stan Nagaiah Trophy in February 1996, also playing in the Saudara Cup later in the year.

After not playing in 1997, he played for Malaysia for the final time in 1998, playing against Lahore City in the Wills Cup, a Pakistani domestic one-day competition. It is his only List A match.
