= Garuka Sanketh =

Sri Lankan cricketer

Personal information
- Born: 30 May 2005 (age 21); Colombo
- Batting: Left-handed
- Bowling: Right arm medium fast
- Role: bowler

Domestic team information
- Years: Team
- 2024–present: Moors Sports Club
- 2024: Chennai Braves Jaguars
- 2024: Colombo Strikers
- 2025: Dubai Capitals

Career statistics
Competition	List A	Twenty20
Matches	6	9
Runs scored	10	5
Batting average	–	–
100s/50s	0/0	0/0
Top score	6*	4*
Balls bowled	198	137
Wickets	7	6
Bowling average	31.71	38.00
5 wickets in innings	0	0
10 wickets in match	0	0
Best bowling	3/29	2/13
Catches/stumpings	1/–	1/–
- Source: Cricinfo, 21 April 2025

Garuka Sanketh (born 30 May 2005) is a Sri Lankan cricketer.

== Biography ==
He attended the Lyceum International School for his primary and secondary education.

== Career ==
He was named in Sri Lankan squad for the 2023 ACC Under-19 Asia Cup which was held in the United Arab Emirates.

In January 2024, he was named in Sri Lanka's squad for the 2024 ICC Under-19 Cricket World Cup which was held in South Africa. Sanketh had an underwhelming Under-19 World Cup campaign in 2024, where he only managed to pick up two scalps in four matches. However, it was his slingy bowling action that caught the attention of the cricketing fraternity during the 2024 edition of the ICC Under-19 Cricket World Cup. Sanketh's bowling action was rated similar to the bowling action of fellow Sri Lankan speedster Matheesha Pathirana. Sanketh's release point at his bowling followthrough during his runup is believed to be slightly higher than that of Pathirana's.

In April 2024, he was roped in as a net bowler by the Delhi Capitals franchise during the 2024 Indian Premier League. Later in the same month, Sanketh was included in the Sri Lanka development squad for a bilateral three match home T20 series against the Uganda national cricket team, which was played at the Galle International Cricket Stadium.

He made his T20 debut playing for SLC Greens against SLC Reds on 4 May 2024 during Sri Lanka's intra-squad T20 World Cup preparation matches, which were organised by Sri Lanka Cricket to finalise Sri Lanka's final squad for the 2024 ICC Men's T20 World Cup. In May 2024, he was bought by Colombo Strikers in the LPL auction for US$13,000 ahead of the 2024 Lanka Premier League. He made his List A debut playing for Moors Sports Club against Kandy Customs Cricket Club on 10 June 2024 at the Major Clubs Limited Over Tournament.

He was picked by Chennai Brave Jaguars for the 2024 Abu Dhabi T10. In November 2024, he was bought by Colombo Jaguars franchise for the inaugural edition of the Lanka T10 in 2024. He was bought by Dubai Capitals ahead of the 2025 International League T20.
