= Jack Wood (Australian cricketer) =

Australian cricketer

Personal information
- Born: 1 October 1996 (age 30)
- Batting: Right-handed
- Bowling: Left-arm unorthodox spin
- Role: Bowler

Domestic team information
- Years: Team
- 2020/21: Queensland
- 2020/21: Brisbane Heat (squad no. 48)

Career statistics
| Competition | T20 |
|---|---|
| Matches | 6 |
| Runs scored | 117 |
| Batting average | 19.50 |
| 100s/50s | 0/0 |
| Top score | 45 |
| Balls bowled | 24 |
| Wickets | 2 |
| Bowling average | 20.50 |
| 5 wickets in innings | 0 |
| 10 wickets in match | 0 |
| Best bowling | 2/28 |
| Catches/stumpings | 0/– |
- Source: Cricinfo, 14 May 2022

Jack Wood (born 1 October 1996) is an Australian cricketer. He made his Twenty20 debut on 11 December 2020, for the Brisbane Heat, in the 2020–21 Big Bash League season.

== Cricket career ==
Wood began his cricket career playing for Ipswich Grammar School and as of 2010 he was playing for a Laidley Under-16's side and earnt selection for the Queensland Under-15's side. In 2012 he achieved recognition for taking 4–76 with the ball in a two-day game for Queensland Country Under-19's against the Queensland Under-17's side. As of 2012 he was playing for Laidley in the Ipswich Logan Premier League and the Ipswich Grammar School 1st XI.

Wood currently plays for Ipswich-Logan in Queensland Premier Cricket. He made his first grade debut for the club in 2014 in what he described as "probably the worst debut in history". In the Australian off-season he played cricket in Buckingham, England, describing it as a positive experience but with little success and in a 2015 interview he stated, "I'm working hard on my batting as well as my bowling. I've been through a little bit of a rough patch. It's just a confidence thing.", and expressed a desire to make the Ipswich-Logan first grade side by performing in second grade.

Wood had a successful 2019/20 season for Ipswich-Logan in which he took 28 wickets and he also took 4 for 79 against South Australia in a 2nd XI match for Queensland and played for a Queensland Academy of Sport T20 side which performed well on the Sunshine Coast. He was awarded a full state contract by Queensland in June 2020, and in December 2020 he was named as a replacement player in the Brisbane Heat squad taking the place of Mitchell Swepson who had international duties. He made his T20 debut for the Heat that month and took 2 for 28 dismissing Ben Dunk with his first ball and also taking Glenn Maxwell's wicket. In January 2021 Swepson returned to the Heat squad replacing Wood.

Wood did not receive a state contract with the Queensland team for the 2022–23 season, but was given a full contract by Brisbane Heat for 2023-24 Big Bash League season.
