= Jishan Alam =

Bangladeshi cricketer (born 2004)

Personal information
- Full name: Jishan Alam
- Born: 10 November 2004 (age 22); Narayanganj, Bangladesh
- Batting: Right-handed
- Bowling: Right-arm offbreak
- Role: Batting allrounder
- Relatives: Jahangir Alam (father); Sohel Hossain (uncle)

Domestic team information
- Years: Team
- 2025: Durbar Rajshahi
- 2026: Rajshahi Warriors

Career statistics
Competition	FC	LA	T20
Matches	4	38	19
Runs scored	349	975	441
Batting average	49.85	27.08	23.21
100s/50s	0/3	0/6	1/2
Top score	97	98	100
Balls bowled	18	568	180
Wickets	0	6	7
Bowling average	–	90.00	34.28
5 wickets in innings	–	0	0
10 wickets in match	–	0	0
Best bowling	–	2/44	1/6
Catches/stumpings	3/0	18/0	6/0
Medal record
Men's Cricket
Representing Bangladesh
U-19 World Cup
Winner	2020 South Africa
- Source: ESPNcricinfo, 4 November 2025

Jishan Alam (Bengali: জিসান আলম; born 10 November 2004) is a Bangladeshi cricketer. A right-handed batsman and right-arm offbreak bowler, Alam plays as a batting allrounder. He has represented Bangladesh at various youth levels, including the Under-19 and Bangladesh A teams.

== Early life and family ==
Alam was born in Narayanganj, Bangladesh, on 10 November 2004. He is the son of Jahangir Alam.

== Domestic career ==
Alam made his List A debut for Agrani Bank Cricket Club against Shinepukur Cricket Club at Fatullah on 2 April 2023. He showcased consistent performances with the bat, scoring 575 runs in 23 matches, including four half-centuries, with a top score of 98.

He made his first-class debut for Dhaka Division against Rajshahi Division at Bogra on 23 November 2024. In two matches, he scored 67 runs with a highest score of 44.

Alam has also played in Twenty20 (T20) matches. In 2024, he delivered standout performances during the National Cricket League Twenty20, including a century against Dhaka Division on 11 December 2024. He ended the season with 296 runs in 9 matches at an average of 32.88 and a strike rate of 151.79.
