= Rashid Khan (Nepalese cricketer) =

Nepalese cricketer (born 2001)

Personal information
- Born: 21 February 2001 (age 25); Birgunj, Nepal
- Batting: Right-handed
- Bowling: Right-arm medium fast

International information
- National side: Nepal
- Only ODI (cap 47): 22 November 2026 v United Arab Emirates
- T20I debut (cap 30): 5 December 2019 v Bhutan
- Last T20I: 9 March 2024 v Hong Kong
Medal record
Representing Nepal
Men's Cricket
South Asian Games
Bronze medal – third place	2019 Kathmandu/Pokhara	Team
- Source: Cricinfo, 9 March 2024

Rashid Khan (born 21 February 2001) is a Nepalese cricketer. He was named in Nepal's squad for the men's cricket tournament at the 2019 South Asian Games. He made his Twenty20 International (T20I) debut for Nepal, against Bhutan, on 5 December 2019. The Nepal team won the bronze medal, beating the Maldives by five wickets in the third-place playoff match. In September 2020, he was one of eighteen cricketers to be awarded with a central contract by the Cricket Association of Nepal.
