= Ethan Brookes =

English cricketer (born 2001)

Personal information
- Full name: Ethan Alexander Brookes
- Born: 23 May 2001 (age 25); Solihull, West Midlands, England
- Batting: Right-handed
- Bowling: Right-arm medium-fast
- Relatives: HJH Brookes (brother)

Domestic team information
- Years: Team
- 2019–2023: Warwickshire (squad no. 77)
- 2024–present: Worcestershire (squad no. 77)
- 2026: Sylhet Titans
- First-class debut: 10 September 2019 Warwickshire v Essex
- List A debut: 22 July 2021 Warwickshire v Glamorgan

Career statistics
Competition	FC	LA	T20
Matches	31	43	44
Runs scored	1,426	715	840
Batting average	28.52	21.66	23.33
100s/50s	3/4	0/4	0/3
Top score	140	63	57
Balls bowled	2,158	1,060	390
Wickets	27	28	21
Bowling average	42.03	32.96	26.14
5 wickets in innings	0	0	0
10 wickets in match	0	0	0
Best bowling	3/34	3/15	4/41
Catches/stumpings	35/–	32/–	18/–
- Source: Cricinfo, 18 July 2026

Ethan Alexander Brookes (born 23 May 2001) is an English cricketer. He made his first-class debut on 10 September 2019, for Warwickshire in the 2019 County Championship. He made his List A debut on 22 July 2021, for Warwickshire in the 2021 Royal London One-Day Cup.

On 8 August 2023, Worcestershire announced that Brookes would be joining the club on a two-year deal following the conclusion of the 2023 season. He signed a new three-year contract with the club in June 2025.

Most recently, he is playing for Sylhet Titans in the 2026 Bangladesh Premier League.
