= Nizakat Khan =

Hong Kong cricketer (born 1992)

Personal information
- Full name: Nizakat Khan
- Born: 8 July 1992 (age 34); Attock, Punjab, Pakistan
- Batting: Right-handed
- Bowling: Right-arm leg break
- Role: All-rounder

International information
- National side: Hong Kong (2014–present)
- ODI debut (cap 25): 1 May 2014 v Afghanistan
- Last ODI: 18 September 2018 v India
- T20I debut (cap 9): 16 March 2014 v Nepal
- Last T20I: 13 November 2025 v Qatar

Career statistics
Competition	ODI	T20I	FC	LA
Matches	20	115	6	67
Runs scored	583	2,282	435	1,723
Batting average	30.68	21.94	39.54	28.24
100s/50s	0/3	0/11	1/3	1/7
Top score	94	81	123	127*
Balls bowled	139	209	180	815
Wickets	4	11	1	19
Bowling average	26.00	19.63	85.00	29.89
5 wickets in innings	0	0	0	0
10 wickets in match	0	0	0	0
Best bowling	1/11	3/19	1/42	4/14
Catches/stumpings	8/–	56/–	4/–	27/–
- Source: Cricinfo, 31 July 2025

Nizakat Khan (born 8 July 1992) is a Pakistani-born Hong Kong cricketer. An all-rounder, Khan is a right-handed batsman who bowls leg break. In August 2021, he was named the captain of the Hong Kong cricket team.

== Biography ==
Having played age-group cricket for Hong Kong Under-19s in the 2010 Under-19 World Cup, Khan proceeded to make his World Cricket League debut for Hong Kong in the 2011 World Cricket League Division Three, where he helped Hong Kong earn promotion to 2011 World Cricket League Division Two. It was in this tournament that he made his List A debut against Uganda. He played 5 further List A matches in the competition, the last of which was against Papua New Guinea. In his 6 matches in the competition, he scored 182 runs at a batting average of 30.33, with 2 half centuries and a high score of 95. His highest score came against Namibia. With the ball he took 10 wickets at a bowling average of 18.80, with best figures of 4/14. His best bowling performance came against Uganda.

He made his One Day International debut against Afghanistan in the 2014 ACC Premier League on 1 May 2014. He was suspended from bowling due to an illegal action during the 2015 ICC World Twenty20 Qualifier in July. He scored his maiden first-class century on 2 September 2016 against Ireland in the 2015–17 ICC Intercontinental Cup.

On 3 June 2018, he was selected to play for the Toronto Nationals in the players' draft for the inaugural edition of the Global T20 Canada tournament. In August 2018, he was named in Hong Kong's squad for the 2018 Asia Cup Qualifier tournament. Hong Kong won the qualifier tournament, and he was then named in Hong Kong's squad for the 2018 Asia Cup.

In December 2018, he was named in Hong Kong's team for the 2018 ACC Emerging Teams Asia Cup. In June 2019, he was selected to play for the Montreal Tigers franchise team in the 2019 Global T20 Canada tournament.

In September 2019, he was named in Hong Kong's squad for the 2019 ICC T20 World Cup Qualifier tournament in the United Arab Emirates. Ahead of the tournament, the International Cricket Council (ICC) named him as the key player in Hong Kong's squad. In November 2019, he was named in Hong Kong's squad for the 2019 ACC Emerging Teams Asia Cup in Bangladesh and for the Cricket World Cup Challenge League B tournament in Oman.

In May 2022, he was named as the captain of Hong Kong's side for the 2022 Uganda Cricket World Cup Challenge League B tournament.
