= Charith Asalanka =

Sri Lankan cricketer (born 1997)

Personal information
- Full name: Kariyawasam Indipalage Charith Asalanka
- Born: 29 June 1997 (age 29); Elpitiya, Sri Lanka
- Batting: Left-handed
- Bowling: Right-arm off break
- Role: Batting-All rounder

International information
- National side: Sri Lanka (2021–present)
- Test debut (cap 157): 29 November 2021 v West Indies
- Last Test: 12 March 2022 v India
- ODI debut (cap 198): 29 June 2021 v England
- Last ODI: 24 January 2026 v England
- T20I debut (cap 87): 25 July 2021 v India
- Last T20I: 11 January 2026 v Pakistan

Domestic team information
- Years: Team
- 2014–2015: Galle Cricket Club
- 2016–2017: Sinhalese Sports Club
- 2016–2017: Mohammedan Sporting Club
- 2020; 2023–2024: Jaffna Kings
- 2021: Kandy Warriors
- 2022: Colombo Stars
- 2023–present: Abu Dhabi Knight Riders
- 2026: Galle Gallants
- 2026: Saint Lucia Kings
- 2026: Biratnagar Kings

Career statistics
| Competition | Test | ODI | T20I | FC |
|---|---|---|---|---|
| Matches | 3 | 82 | 72 | 50 |
| Runs scored | 88 | 2,721 | 1,396 | 2,417 |
| Batting average | 14.67 | 42.51 | 22.51 | 30.59 |
| 100s/50s | 0/0 | 5/17 | 0/6 | 3/16 |
| Top score | 29 | 127 | 80* | 128 |
| Balls bowled | 25 | 749 | 173 | 2,951 |
| Wickets | 0 | 18 | 7 | 45 |
| Bowling average | – | 34.44 | 33.14 | 39.51 |
| 5 wickets in innings | – | 0 | 0 | 1 |
| 10 wickets in match | – | 0 | 0 | 1 |
| Best bowling | – | 4/18 | 3/50 | 6/112 |
| Catches/stumpings | 1/– | 21/– | 19/– | 33/– |
Medal record
Men's cricket
Representing Sri Lanka
ACC Asia Cup
| Winner | 2022 UAE |
| Runner-up | 2023 Pakistan |
ACC Emerging Asia Cup
| Winner | 2018 Pakistan-SriLanka |
South Asian Games
| Silver medal – second place | 2019 Nepal |
- Source: ESPNcricinfo, 24 January 2026

Kariyawasam Indipalage Charith Asalanka (born 29 June 1997) is a Sri Lankan professional cricketer and former captain of the Limited Overs formats for the Sri Lanka national team. He is an aggressive left-handed batsman who bats at the number five position in ODIs, and bowls part-time handy off spin. On pitches that favour spin, he has the potential to take useful wickets and contribute significantly as an all-rounder. Asalanka made his international debut for Sri Lanka in June 2021 under Dasun Shanaka's captaincy.

== Early career ==
Asalanka toured England in 2013, opening the batting and top-scoring in each innings with 92 and 31 in a three-day match against an English under-17 team at Loughborough. He opened the batting for his school, Richmond College, Galle in 2014–15, helping them into the final of the schools' twenty-20 competition. He captained the national under-19 team against under-19 teams from Australia and Bangladesh in 2014–15. In the five-match limited-overs series against Bangladesh under-19, he was Sri Lanka's highest scorer, with 225 runs at an average of 45.00, and second-highest wicket-taker, with eight wickets at 21.00. He was the most prominent figure in Sri Lanka's victory in the first match, with 4 for 36 and 63. He was awarded Schoolboy Cricketer of the Year award in the years 2015 and 2016, becoming only the seventh player to win the award twice. In 2016, he also became the 1st player to score a hundred in both the 2-day and one-day matches of Lovers Quarrel.

== Domestic career ==
Asalanka made his first-class debut in April 2015 in the match to decide who should take the final place in the Premier Trophy in the following season. His team, Galle, batted first and were all out for 31. Sri Lanka Air Force Sports Club made 215 in reply. In their second innings, Galle lost their first wicket in the second over, but Asalanka, batting at number three, hit 114 off 123 balls, and Galle totalled 295. Sri Lanka Air Force Sports Club needed 112 to win, but Asalanka took 4 for 34 (Malith de Silva, also making his first-class debut, took 6 for 46) to dismiss them for 107, and Galle won by four runs.

He made his Twenty20 debut for Sinhalese Sports Club in the 2017–18 SLC Twenty20 Tournament on 1 March 2018.

In April 2018, he was named in Kandy's squad for the 2018 Super Provincial One Day Tournament. In August 2018, he was named in Kandy's squad for the 2018 SLC T20 League. He was the leading wicket-taker for Kandy in the tournament, with ten dismissals in six matches. In October 2020, he was drafted by the Jaffna Stallions for the inaugural edition of the Lanka Premier League.

In March 2021, he captained Sinhalese Sports Club as they won the 2020–21 SLC Twenty20 Tournament, the first time they had won the tournament since 2005.

On 24 March 2021, in the Major Clubs Limited Over Tournament, Asalanka scored a brilliant unbeaten century against Police Sports Club: 178 runs from 145 balls, with 16 boundaries and five sixes. Sinhalese Sports Club scored 339 runs and won the match by 31 runs. On 1 April 2021, again in the Major Clubs Limited Over Tournament, Asalanka scored a match-winning century against Colts Cricket Club: 101 not out from 89 balls while chasing 278 runs, with a productive partnership with Avishka Fernando. Sinhalese Sports Club won by eight wickets with 68 balls remaining.

In August 2021, he was named as the vice-captain of the SLC Greys team for the 2021 SLC Invitational T20 League tournament. In November 2021, he was selected to play for the Kandy Warriors following the players' draft for the 2021 Lanka Premier League.

During the 4th match of the National Super League, while representing team Colombo, Asalanka scored the 13th List A half-century against team Dambulla while chasing 143 runs. He also took two wickets while bowling. Finally, team Colombo won the match by seven wickets. In July 2022, he was signed by the Colombo Stars for the third edition of the Lanka Premier League.

== U19 captaincy ==
Asalanka captained Sri Lanka under-19 in a two-match series against Pakistan under-19 in October 2015, scoring 334 runs at an average of 167.00, with a double-century and a century. He also captained Sri Lanka in the 2016 Under-19 Cricket World Cup.

In November 2018, he was added to Sri Lanka's Test squad for their series against England, but he did not play. In December 2018, he was named as the captain of the Sri Lanka team for the 2018 ACC Emerging Teams Asia Cup. In November 2019, he was named as the captain of Sri Lanka's squad for the 2019 ACC Emerging Teams Asia Cup in Bangladesh. Later the same month, he was named as the captain of Sri Lanka's squad for the cricket tournament at the 2019 South Asian Games. The Sri Lanka team won the silver medal, after they lost to Bangladesh by seven wickets in the final.

== International career ==
In June 2021, Asalanka was named in Sri Lanka's squad for their tour of England. He made his One Day International (ODI) debut on 29 June 2021, for Sri Lanka against England. In July 2021, he was named in Sri Lanka's squad for their series against India. On 19 July 2021, Asalanka scored his maiden ODI fifty against India. He made his T20I debut on 25 July 2021, for Sri Lanka against India.

In the first ODI against South Africa on 2 September 2021, Asalanka scored his second ODI half-century. During the course, he put a match-winning partnership with Avishka Fernando. Finally, Sri Lanka won the match by 14 runs. In the second ODI, he made another fifty in a losing course. In the third ODI, Asalanka scored 47 runs and helped Sri Lanka to post a total of 203 runs in 50 overs. Later, he took his first ODI wicket by dismissing Andile Phehlukwayo. Finally, Sri Lanka won the match by 78 runs, and Asalanka won the Player of the Series award for his consistent batting performance as the highest run-getter of the series. Later the same month, Asalanka was named in Sri Lanka's squad for the 2021 ICC Men's T20 World Cup.

On 24 October 2021, Asalanka scored his maiden T20I half-century against Bangladesh. While chasing 171 runs, he scored an unbeaten 80 runs from 49 deliveries, hitting five boundaries and five sixes. Finally, Sri Lanka won the match by five wickets, and Asalanka won the Player of the Match award for his performance.

On 4 November 2021, against West Indies, Asalanka scored second T20I half century. He hit eight boundaries and one six while scoring 68 runs from 41 balls. Finally, Sri Lanka won the match by 20 runs, and Asalanka won the Player of the match award for his performance. He is highest run scorer for Sri Lanka and 5th highest run scorer in T20 world cup 2021 scoring 231 runs in 6 matches with average of 46.20 hitting two half centuries. In November 2021, he was named in Sri Lanka's Test squad for their series against the West Indies. He made his Test debut, against the West Indies, on 29 November 2021.

On 16 January 2022, in the first ODI against Zimbabwe, Asalanka scored his fourth ODI half-century. While chasing down 297 runs, he scored 71 runs from 68 balls, hitting six fours and two sixes. Asalanka and Dinesh Chandimal put on a 132-run partnership. Sri Lanka won the match by five wickets. On 3rd ODI match against Zimbabwe, Asalanka scored fifth ODI half-century. He scored 52 runs from 56 deliveries. During that process, Asalanka scored 2000 List A runs. Finally, Sri Lanka won the match by 184 runs and won the series. Asalanka won the player of the match award for his performance. On 21 June 2022, fourth ODI against Australia, Asalanka scored his maiden ODI century. He scored 110 runs from 106 balls, hitting 10 boundaries and one six. His knock helped Sri Lanka score 258 runs and won the match by four runs and won the series. Asalanka won the player of the match award for his performance.

On 30 November 2022, 3rd ODI against Afghanistan, Asalanka scored his sixth ODI half-century. He scored unbeaten 83 runs, hitting five boundaries and four sixes. Because of his knock, Sri Lanka successfully chased down the target of 313, and Asalanka won the player of the match award for his performance. On 2 April 2023, first T20I match against New Zealand, Asalanka scored his 4th T20I half-century. He scored 67 runs from 41 deliveries, hitting two boundaries and six sixes. The match went to super over, and Asalanka hit six and boundary to chase down the target and win the game. Due to his batting performance, Asalanka won the player of the match award. On 27 of June 2023, against Scotland, Asalanka scored his 8th ODI half century. He scored 63 runs from 65 deliveries, hitting four boundaries and two sixes. Finally, Sri Lanka won the match by 82 runs.

On 31 August 2023, the first match of Asia cup against Bangladesh, Asalanka scored his 9th ODI half-century. While chasing down the target of 164 runs, he scored an unbeaten 62 runs from 92 deliveries, hitting five boundaries and one six. Finally, Sri Lanka won the match by five wickets. In Sri Lanka's match against South Africa in the 2023 Cricket World Cup, Asalanka scored his 10th ODI half-century and ended on 79 runs from 65 deliveries, hitting eight boundaries and four sixes. Despite his knock, Sri Lanka lost the match. On 6 January 2024, during the first ODI match against Zimbabwe, Asalanka scored his third ODI century. Despite his knock, the match was abandoned due to heavy rain.

In May 2024, he was named in Sri Lanka’s squad for the 2024 ICC Men's T20 World Cup tournament.

== International centuries ==
=== ODI centuries ===
| No. | Score | Against | Pos. | Inn. | SR | Venue | H/A/N | Date | Result | Ref |
|---|---|---|---|---|---|---|---|---|---|---|
| 1 | 110 (Note: Player of the match) | Australia | 5 | 1 | 103.77 | R. Premadasa Stadium, Colombo | Home | 21 June 2022 | Won | |
| 2 | 108 | Bangladesh | 5 | 1 | 102.85 | Arun Jaitley Cricket Stadium, New Delhi | Neutral | 6 November 2023 | Lost | |
| 3 | 101 | Zimbabwe | 5 | 1 | 106.31 | R. Premadasa Stadium, Colombo | Home | 6 January 2024 | No result | |
| 4 | 127 (Note: Captained the Sri Lanka team) | Australia | 5 | 1 | 100.79 | R. Premadasa Stadium, Colombo | Home | 12 February 2025 | Won | |
| 5 | 106 | Bangladesh | 5 | 1 | 86.17 | R. Premadasa Stadium, Colombo | Home | 2 July 2025 | Won | |

== Awards ==
- Schoolboy Cricketer of the Year: 2015, 2016
- ICC Men's ODI Team of the Year: 2024
- Sri Lanka Cricket Best Men's ODI Batter of the Year: 2025
