= Lahiru Madushanka =

Sri Lankan cricketer

Personal information
- Full name: Lahiru Dilshan Madushanka
- Born: 12 September 1992 (age 34); Matale, Sri Lanka
- Batting: Right-handed
- Bowling: Right-arm fast-medium
- Role: Allrounder

International information
- National side: Sri Lanka (2017–2021)
- ODI debut (cap 179): 4 February 2017 v South Africa
- Last ODI: 30 June 2017 v Zimbabwe
- T20I debut (cap 81): 6 September 2019 v New Zealand
- Last T20I: 14 September 2021 v South Africa

Domestic team information
- Years: Team
- 2017–: Colombo Cricket Club
- 2015-2016: Bloomfield Cricket and Athletic Club
- 2020: Dambulla Viiking

Career statistics
Competition	ODI	T20I	FC	LA
Matches	4	3	78	78
Runs scored	14	22	2,963	998
Batting average	4.66	7.33	35.69	26.26
100s/50s	0/0	0/0	3/19	0/1
Top score	7	20	164	51*
Balls bowled	144	24	6,475	2,202
Wickets	4	0	114	66
Bowling average	43.00	–	32.66	27.22
5 wickets in innings	0	–	4	0
10 wickets in match	0	–	0	0
Best bowling	2/70	–	6/51	4/54
Catches/stumpings	0/–	0/–	49/–	31/–
- Source: Cricinfo, 5 January 2023

Lahiru Dilshan Madushanka (born 12 September 1992) is a professional Sri Lankan cricketer, who plays for limited over internationals. A handy right-handed batsman, Madushanka bowls right-arm medium-fast. He is an old Thomian of St. Thomas' College, Matale.

== Personal life and early career ==
Madushanka first entered to Elahera Maha Vidyalaya for primary education. After passing grade 5 scholarship, he entered to St. Thomas' College, Matale where he continued to rise in cricket career. After playing for the school matches, he has picked to the under-19 cricket team for the Quadrangular Under-19 Series in 2011. He showed immense talent within the series, where his knock of 63 and 4 for 17 runs against India U-19, produced only in the losing side with just 5 runs short. Within the series, against Australia U-19s, Lahiru scored an unbeaten 56 runs, giving the team total of 225. Australia finally lost the match by 86 runs.

Madhushanka is married to longtime partner Thilini Kaluarachchi where the wedding was celebrated in June 2020 in Arangala Resort, Naula. The couple has one son.

== Domestic career ==
In 2012, Lahiru was picked to the Under-19 World Cup 2012. The first match for Sri Lanka was against Namibia U-19s, where Lahiru was able to pick up 4 for 15 runs. The match was eventually won by Sri Lanka with 195 runs. He took 6 wickets for 24 runs against Ireland U-19 team, where Sri Lanka won the match by 109 runs.

In the 2015 cricket season, Lahiru played for the Bloomfield in SLC Twenty20 Tournament 2015. He scored his highest T20 score of 41* runs against Sri Lanka Air Force Sports Club.

Madushanka was included to the Sri Lanka A team for the tour in New tealand and played the second unofficial ODI. He took 2 wickets for 57 runs and Sri Lanka won the match by 7 wickets finally. However, he didn't include for the rest of the matches and Sri Lanka A finally lost the series to 3–2.

In April 2018, he was named in Dambulla's squad for the 2018 Super Provincial One Day Tournament. In August 2018, he was named in Colombo's squad the 2018 SLC T20 League. In March 2019, he was named in Galle's squad for the 2019 Super Provincial One Day Tournament.

In July 2019, Madushanka was included to the Sri Lanka Emerging Team squad for the tour of South Africa. On 14 July 2019 in the final one day match against University Sports South Africa XI, Madushanka took 4 wickets for 35 runs and finally Sri Lanka Emerging Team won the match and series. He adjudged man of the match for bowling performances.

In October 2020, he was drafted by the Dambulla Hawks for the inaugural edition of the Lanka Premier League. In August 2021, he was named in the SLC Greys team for the 2021 SLC Invitational T20 League tournament. In November 2021, he was selected to play for the Galle Gladiators following the players' draft for the 2021 Lanka Premier League.

== International career ==
In January 2017 he was named in Sri Lanka's One Day International (ODI) squad for their series against South Africa. He made his ODI debut on 4 February 2017 against South Africa at the Wanderers Stadium, Johannesburg. He was dismissed for a duck, but took his first international wicket in his first over, by dismissing Faf du Plessis for 24 runs. In the series, Madushanka took the wicket of du Plessis in all three times in last three games.

He was included into the preliminary squad with 22 players for the ODI series against Bangladesh. However, he was cut off from the final 15 for the series. In August 2019, he was named in Sri Lanka's Twenty20 International (T20I) squad for their series against New Zealand. He made his T20I debut for Sri Lanka, against New Zealand, on 6 September 2019. He scored 20 runs in the match. Sri Lanka won the match by 37 runs courtesy of Lasith Malinga's four in four.

In September 2021, Madushanka was named in Sri Lanka's squad for the 2021 ICC Men's T20 World Cup. However, he was later ruled out of Sri Lanka's squad due to a fractured collarbone. After strong performances in the domestic arena, Madushanka was recalled for the T20I series and ODI series against Australia in June 2022.

In October 2024, Madushanka was named as the captain of Sri Lanka for the 2024 Hong Kong Cricket Sixes tournament held in Hong Kong, where Sri Lanka won the tournament under Madushanka after 17 years. In the first round of the tournament, Sri Lanka defeated Oman and Bangladesh and qualified for the quarter finals. In the quarter final, they defeated Nepal and reached the semi final against Bangladesh. In the semi final, Sri Lanka defeated Bangladesh in the penultimate ball and reached the final with Pakistan. Pakistan was bowled out for 75 and Sri Lanka won the match comfortably by 3 wickets.

== See also ==
- Sri Lanka national cricket team
- List of St. Thomas' College, Matale alumni
