= Tharindu Rathnayake =

Sri Lankan cricketer (born 1996)

Personal information
- Full name: Konganige Tharindu Hasanka Ratnayake
- Born: 18 April 1996 (age 30); Marawila, Sri Lanka
- Batting: Left-handed
- Bowling: Right-arm off break, Slow left-arm orthodox

International information
- National side: Sri Lanka
- Test debut (cap 169): 17 June 2025 v Bangladesh
- Last Test: 25 June 2025 v Bangladesh

Domestic team information
- Years: Team
- 2015/16–2020–21: Singhalese Sports Club
- 2017/18: Moors Sports Club
- 2021/22–2023/24: Sebastianites Cricket and Athletic Club
- 2021–23: Dambulla Sixers
- 2024/25: Tamil Union Cricket and Athletic Club
- 2026: Galle Gallants
- 2026: Sudurpaschim Royals
Medal record
Men's cricket
Representing Sri Lanka
Asian Games
Bronze medal – third place	2026 Aichi–Nagoya	Team
- Source: ESPNcricinfo, 14 January 2017

Tharindu Rathnayake (born 18 April 1996) is a Sri Lankan cricketer. He made his first-class debut for Sinhalese Sports Club in the 2015–16 Premier League Tournament on 26 December 2013. In March 2018, he was named in Dambulla's squad for the 2017–18 Super Four Provincial Tournament.

He was the leading wicket-taker for Sinhalese Sports Club in the 2018–19 Premier League Tournament, with 53 dismissals in ten matches. In October 2020, he was drafted by the Colombo Kings for the inaugural edition of the Lanka Premier League. In March 2021, he was part of the Sinhalese Sports Club team that won the 2020–21 SLC Twenty20 Tournament, the first time they had won the tournament since 2005.

In November 2021, he was selected to play for the Dambulla Giants following the players' draft for the 2021 Lanka Premier League. In July 2022, he was signed by the Dambulla Giants for the third edition of the Lanka Premier League.
