= Nimesh Vimukthi =

Sri Lankan cricketer (born 1997)

Personal information
- Born: 7 May 1997 (age 29)
- Batting: Left-handed
- Bowling: Left-arm orthodox spin
- Role: All-rounder

International information
- National side: Sri Lanka
- Only T20I (cap 106): 4 October 2023 v Afghanistan
- Source: ESPNcricinfo, 13 January 2022

Nimesh Vimukthi (born 7 May 1997) is a Sri Lankan cricketer. He made his first-class debut for Panadura Sports Club in the 2016–17 Premier Trophy on 2 December 2016. In August 2021, he was named in the SLC Reds team for the 2021 SLC Invitational T20 League tournament. However, prior to the first match, he tested positive for COVID-19, ruling him out of the tournament. In November 2021, he was selected to play for the Kandy Warriors following the players' draft for the 2021 Lanka Premier League.

In January 2022, he was named as one of six reserve players in Sri Lanka's One Day International (ODI) squad for their series against Zimbabwe. In July 2022, he was signed by the Galle Gladiators for the third edition of the Lanka Premier League.
