= Movin Subasingha =

Sri Lankan cricketer (born 2000)

Personal information
- Full name: Movin Hansaja Subasingha
- Born: 6 July 2000 (age 26); Colombo, Sri Lanka
- Batting: Right hand Bat
- Bowling: Right arm Offbreak
- Role: Allrounder

Domestic team information
- Years: Team
- 2025: Lumbini Lions
- Source: Cricinfo, 6 January 2020

Movin Subasingha (born 6 July 2000) is a Sri Lankan cricketer. He made his List A debut on 17 December 2019, for Nugegoda Sports and Welfare Club in the 2019–20 Invitation Limited Over Tournament. He made his Twenty20 debut on 6 January 2020, for Nugegoda Sports and Welfare Club in the 2019–20 SLC Twenty20 Tournament. In July 2022, he was signed by the Galle Gladiators for the third edition of the Lanka Premier League.
