= Thanuka Dabare =

Sri Lankan cricketer (born 1998)

Personal information
- Full name: P Thanuka Madshan Dabare
- Born: 20 August 1998 (age 28); Colombo, Sri Lanka

Domestic team information
- Years: Team
- 2017-2020: Hadspen Cricket Club (squad no. N/A)
- Source: Cricinfo, 14 January 2018

Thanuka Dabare (born 20 August 1998) is a Sri Lankan cricketer. He made his first-class debut for Saracens Sports Club in the 2017–18 Premier League Tournament on 12 January 2018. He made his List A debut for Saracens Sports Club in the 2017–18 Premier Limited Overs Tournament on 9 March 2018.

== Hadspen Cricket Club ==
Thanuka Dabare played 72 matches for Hadspen in the Tasmanian Cricket league (TCL). He Averaged 52.27 in 69 innings. He also took 82 wickets with an average of 12.85
