= 2022 Asia Cup final =

Cricket tournament in United Arab Emirates

2020 Asia Cup Final
- Event: 2020 Asia Cup
Sri Lanka	Pakistan
(Sri Lanka)	(Pakistan)
170/6	147
20 overs	20 overs
- Sri Lanka won by 23 runs
- Date: 11 September 2022
- Venue: Dubai International Cricket Stadium, Dubai
- Player of the match: Bhanuka Rajapaksa (SL)
- Umpires: Anil Chaudhary (Ind) and Masudur Rahman (Ban)
- Attendance: 23,968

The 2022 Asia Cup Final was the final of the 2022 Asia Cup, a Twenty20 International cricket tournament, played between Pakistan and Sri Lanka on 11 September 2022 in Dubai. India were the defending champions, and were eliminated in the Super Four stage. Sri Lanka beat Pakistan by 23 runs to win their sixth title.

== Background ==
The qualifier tournament had been postponed in July 2020. In May 2021, the ACC confirmed that there would be no Asia Cup in 2021, with that edition of the tournament deferred until 2023. In October 2021, following a meeting with the ACC, Ramiz Raja confirmed that Pakistan would host the following tournament in 2023, with Sri Lanka hosting the 2022 edition. A qualification tournament was played in August 2022.

On 17 July 2022, due to the economic crisis in Sri Lanka and mass protests across the country, the Secretary of SLC Mohan de Silva stated that the tournament will be hosted in the United Arab Emirates.

== Road to the final ==
Pakistan
Titles
Sri Lanka
Opponent
Result
Group Stage
Opponent
Result
India
Lost
Match 1
Afghanistan
Lost
Hong Kong
Won
Match 2
Bangladesh
Won
Group A table

Pos	Team	Pld	Pts
1	India	2	4
2	Pakistan	2	2
3	Hong Kong	2	0

Source: ESPNcricinfo

Advanced to the Super Four

Final standings
Group B table

Pos	Team	Pld	Pts
1	Afghanistan	2	4
2	Sri Lanka	2	2
3	Bangladesh	2	0

Source: ESPNcricinfo

Advanced to the Super Four

Opponent
Result
Super Four
Opponent
Result
India
Won
Match 1
Afghanistan
Won
Afghanistan
Won
Match 2
India
Won
Sri Lanka
Lost
Match 3
Pakistan
Won
Super Four Table

Pos	Team	Pld	W	L	NR	Pts	NRR
1	Sri Lanka	3	3	0	0	6	0.701
2	Pakistan	3	2	1	0	4	−0.279
3	India	3	1	2	0	2	1.607
4	Afghanistan	3	0	3	0	0	−2.006

Source: ESPNcricinfo

Advanced to the final

== Match ==
=== Match officials ===
- On-field umpires: Anil Chaudhary (Ind) and Masudur Rahman (Ban)
- Third umpire: Bismillah Jan Shinwari (Afg)
- Reserve umpire: Jayaraman Madanagopal (Ind)
- Match referee: Andy Pycroft (Zim)
- Toss: Pakistan won the toss and elected to field.

=== Summary ===
11 September 2022
18:00 (N)
Scorecard

Sri Lanka; 170/6 (20 overs)	v	Pakistan; 147 (20 overs)
Bhanuka Rajapaksa 71* (45); Haris Rauf 3/29 (4 overs)		Mohammad Rizwan 55 (49); Pramod Madushan 4/34 (4 overs)

Sri Lanka won by 23 runs
Dubai International Cricket Stadium, Dubai
Umpires: Anil Chaudhary (Ind) and Masudur Rahman (Ban)
Player of the match: Bhanuka Rajapaksa (SL)

- Pakistan won the toss and elected to field.

=== Scorecard ===
Sri Lanka batting
Player	Status	Runs	Balls	4s	6s	Strike rate
Pathum Nissanka	c Babar b Rauf	8	11	1	0	72.72
Kusal Mendis	b Naseem	0	1	0	0	0.00
Dhananjaya de Silva	c and b Iftikhar	28	21	4	0	133.33
Danushka Gunathilaka	b Rauf	1	4	0	0	25.00
Bhanuka Rajapaksa	not out	71	45	6	3	157.77
Dasun Shanaka	b Shadab	2	3	0	0	66.66
Wanindu Hasaranga	c Rizwan b Rauf	36	21	5	1	171.42
Chamika Karunaratne	not out	14	14	0	1	100.00
Maheesh Theekshana	Did not bat					
Pramod Madushan	Did not bat					
Dilshan Madushanka	Did not bat					
Total	20 overs	170	120	16	5	8.50 (run rate)

Pakistan bowling
Bowler	Overs	Maidens	Runs	Wickets	Economy
Naseem Shah	4	0	40	1	10.00
Mohammad Hasnain	4	0	41	0	10.25
Haris Rauf	4	0	29	3	7.25
Shadab Khan	4	0	28	1	7.00
Iftikhar Ahmed	3	0	21	1	7.00
Mohammad Nawaz	1	0	3	0	3.00

Fall of wickets: 2/1 (K. Mendis, 0.3 ov), 23/2 (P. Nissanka, 3.2 ov), 36/3 (D. Gunathilaka, 5.1 ov), 53/4 (D. de Silva, 7.4 ov), 58/5 (D. Shanaka, 8.5 ov), 116/6 (W. Hasaranga, 14.5 ov)

Pakistan batting
Batsman	Method of dismissal	Runs	Balls	4s	6s	Strike rate
Mohammad Rizwan	c Gunathilaka b Hasaranga	55	49	4	1	112.24
Babar Azam	c Madushanka b Madushan	5	6	0	0	83.33
Fakhar Zaman	b Madushan	0	1	0	0	0.00
Iftikhar Ahmed	c sub Bandara b Madushan	32	31	2	1	103.22
Mohammad Nawaz	c Madushan b Karunaratne	6	9	0	0	66.66
Khushdil Shah	c Theekshana b Hasaranga	2	4	0	0	50.00
Asif Ali	b Hasaranga	0	1	0	0	0.00
Shadab Khan	c Gunathilaka b Theekshana	8	6	1	0	133.33
Haris Rauf	b Karunaratne	13	9	1	1	144.44
Naseem Shah	c Karunaratne b Madushan	4	2	1	0	200.00
Mohammad Hasnain	not out	8	4	0	1	200.00
Extras	(0b, 0lb, 2nb, 12wd)	14				
Totals	(20 overs, 7.35 runs per over)	147				

Sri Lanka bowling
Bowler	Overs	Maidens	Runs	Wickets	Economy
Dilshan Madushanka	3	0	24	0	8.00
Mahesh Theekshana	4	0	25	1	6.25
Pramod Madushan	4	0	34	4	8.50
Wanindu Hasaranga	4	0	27	3	6.75
Chamika Karunaratne	4	0	33	2	8.25
Dhananjaya de Silva	1	0	4	0	4.00

Fall of wickets: 22/1 (Babar, 3.2 ov), 22/2 (Fakhar, 3.3 ov), 93/3 (Iftikhar, 13.2 ov), 102/4 (Nawaz, 15.2 ov), 110/5 (Rizwan, 16.1 ov), 111/6 (A. Ali, 16.3 ov), 112/7 (Khushdil, 16.5 ov), 120/8 (Shadab, 17.6 ov) 125/9 (Naseem, 18.2 ov), 147/10 (Rauf, 19.6 ov)
