= Sri Lanka at the Men's T20 World Cup =

Sri Lanka team performance at T20 World Cup

The Sri Lanka cricket team is one of the full members of the International Cricket Council (ICC) and have competed in every Men's T20 World Cup since its inception. They are one of the six teams to have won the title, having been the champions of the 2014 ICC World Twenty20. The team have also been runners-up on two occasions in 2009 and 2012.

Sri Lanka has also hosted the 2012 World Cup and has co-hosted the 2026 edition alongside India. In nine editions, the team has a win-loss record of 28-15 wins in 43 matches.

== T20 World Cup record ==
Legend

- Champions
- Runners-up
- Third place/Semi-finals
- Hosts

Year	Round	Position	GP	W	L	T	NR	Ab (Note: Abandoned matches are not counted in the official records.)	Captain
(South Africa) 2007	Super 8	6/12	5	3	2	0	0	0	Mahela Jayawardene
(England) 2009	Runners-up	2/12	7	6	1	0	0	0	Kumar Sangakkara
(Cricket West Indies) 2010	Semi-final	3/12	6	3	3	0	0	0	Kumar Sangakkara
(Sri Lanka) 2012	Runners-up	2/12	7	4	2	1	0	0	Mahela Jayawardene
(Bangladesh) 2014	Champions	1/16	6	5	1	0	0	0	Dinesh Chandimal
(India) 2016	Super 10	8/16	4	1	3	0	0	0	Angelo Mathews
(United Arab Emirates) (Oman) 2021	Super 12	8/16	8	5	3	0	0	0	Dasun Shanaka
(Australia) 2022	Super 12	7/16	8	4	4	0	0	0	Dasun Shanaka
(Cricket West Indies) (United States) 2024	Group stage	12/20	4	1	2	0	0	1	Wanindu Hasaranga
(India) (Sri Lanka) 2026	Super 8	7/20	7	3	4	0	0	0	Dasun Shanaka
Total	1 title	10/10	62	35	25	1	0	1	—N/a

=== Record by opponents ===
Opponent	M	W	L	T+W	T+L	NR	Ab	Win %	First played
Afghanistan	2	2	0	0	0	0	0	100	2016
Australia	6	2	4	0	0	0	0	33.33	2007
Bangladesh	3	2	1	0	0	0	0	66.67	2007
England	7	1	6	0	0	0	0	14.28	2010
India	2	2	0	0	0	0	0	100	2010
Ireland	4	4	0	0	0	0	0	100	2009
Kenya	1	1	0	0	0	0	0	100	2007
Namibia	2	1	1	0	0	0	0	50.00	2021
Nepal	1	0	0	0	0	0	1	—	2024
Netherlands	4	4	0	0	0	0	0	100	2014
New Zealand	7	3	3	1	0	0	0	57.14	2007
Oman	1	1	0	0	0	0	0	100	2026
Pakistan	5	2	3	0	0	0	0	40.00	2007
South Africa	5	1	4	0	0	0	0	20.00	2012
United Arab Emirates	1	1	0	0	0	0	0	100	2022
West Indies	8	6	2	0	0	0	0	75.00	2009
Zimbabwe	3	2	1	0	0	0	0	66.67	2010
Total	62	35	25	1	0	0	1	59.02	—
Source: Last Updated: 8 March 2026

== Tournament results ==
=== 2007 World Cup ===
Squad

- Mahela Jayawardene (c)
- Kumar Sangakkara (wk)
- Chamara Silva
- Upul Tharanga
- Tillakaratne Dilshan
- Hasantha Fernando
- Sanath Jayasuriya
- Kaushal Lokuarachchi
- Farveez Maharoof
- Jehan Mubarak
- Dilruwan Perera
- Gayan Wijekoon
- Dilhara Fernando
- Lasith Malinga
- Chaminda Vaas

Results

Group stage (Group C)			Super 8s (Group F)				Semifinal	Final	Overall Result
Opposition Result	Opposition Result	Rank	Opposition Result	Opposition Result	Opposition Result	Rank	Opposition Result	Opposition Result	Overall Result
Kenya; Won by 9 wickets	New Zealand; Won by 7 wickets	3	Pakistan; Lost by 33 runs	Bangladesh; Won by 64 runs	Australia; Lost by 10 wickets	3	Did not advance		Super 8s
Source: Cricinfo

Scorecards

Group stage (Group C)

14 September
10:00
(scorecard)

Sri Lanka; 260/6 (20 overs)	v	Kenya; 88 (19.3 overs)
Sanath Jayasuriya 88 (44); Jimmy Kamande 3/48 (4 overs)		Alex Obanda 21 (25); Tillakaratne Dilshan 2/4 (1.3 overs)

Sri Lanka won by 172 runs
Wanderers Stadium, Johannesburg
Umpires: Daryl Harper (Aus) and Nigel Llong (Eng)
Player of the match: Sanath Jayasuriya (SL)

- Kenya won the toss and elected to field.
- Sri Lanka's score of 260 for six was the highest recorded in any top-level Twenty20 match. They also recorded the largest margin of victory in Twenty20 Internationals.
- Sri Lanka qualified for the Super 8s as a result of this match.

15 September
14:00
(scorecard)

New Zealand; 164/7 (20 overs)	v	Sri Lanka; 168/3 (18.5 overs)
Ross Taylor 62 (42); Dilhara Fernando 2/31 (4 overs)		Sanath Jayasuriya 61 (44); Daniel Vettori 2/23 (4 overs)

Sri Lanka won by 7 wickets
Wanderers Stadium, Johannesburg
Umpires: Mark Benson (Eng) Daryl Harper (Aus)
Player of the match: Sanath Jayasuriya (SL)

- New Zealand won the toss and elected to bat.

Super 8 (Group F)

17 September
18:00
(scorecard)

Pakistan; 189/6 (20 overs)	v	Sri Lanka; 156/9 (20 overs)
Shoaib Malik 57 (31); Lasith Malinga 3/43 (4 overs)		Chamara Silva 38 (27); Shahid Afridi 3/18 (4 overs)

Pakistan won by 33 runs
Wanderers Stadium, Johannesburg
Umpires: Daryl Harper (Aus) and Nigel Llong (Eng)
Player of the match: Younis Khan (Pak)

- Sri Lanka won the toss and elected to field.

18 September
18:00
(scorecard)

Sri Lanka; 147/5 (20 overs)	v	Bangladesh; 83 (15.5 overs)
Jehan Mubarak 31* (19); Mahmudullah 1/19 (4 overs)		Aftab Ahmed 18 (11); Sanath Jayasuriya 2/4 (1.5 overs)

Sri Lanka won by 64 runs
Wanderers Stadium, Johannesburg
Umpires: Mark Benson (Eng) and Daryl Harper (Aus)
Player of the match: Dilhara Fernando (SL)

- Bangladesh won the toss and elected to field.

20 September
10:00
(scorecard)

Sri Lanka; 101 (19.3 overs)	v	Australia; 102/0 (10.2 overs)
Jehan Mubarak 28 (26); Stuart Clark 4/20 (4 overs)		Matthew Hayden 58* (38)

Australia won by 10 wickets
Newlands Cricket Ground, Cape Town
Umpires: Asad Rauf (Pak) and Ian Howell (SA)
Player of the match: Stuart Clark (Aus)

- Australia won the toss and elected to field.

=== 2009 World Cup ===
Squad

- Kumar Sangakkara (c, wk)
- Mahela Jayawardene
- Chamara Silva
- Tillakaratne Dilshan
- Sanath Jayasuriya
- Farveez Maharoof
- Angelo Mathews
- Jehan Mubarak
- Isuru Udana
- Muthiah Muralidaran
- Nuwan Kulasekara
- Lasith Malinga
- Ajantha Mendis
- Thilan Thushara
- Indika de Saram

Results

Group stage (Group C)			Super 8s (Group F)				Semifinal	Final	Overall Result
Opposition Result	Opposition Result	Rank	Opposition Result	Opposition Result	Opposition Result	Rank	Opposition Result	Opposition Result	Overall Result
Australia; Won by 6 wickets	West Indies; Won by 15 runs	1	Pakistan; Won by 19 runs	Ireland; Won by 9 runs	New Zealand; Won by 48 runs	1	West Indies; Won by 57 runs	Pakistan; Lost by 8 wickets	Runners-up
Source: Cricinfo

Scorecards

Group stage (Group C)

8 June 2009
17:30 (D/N)
Scorecard

Australia; 159/9 (20 overs)	v	Sri Lanka; 160/4 (19 overs)
Mitchell Johnson 28* (13); Ajantha Mendis 3/20 (4 overs)		Kumar Sangakkara 55* (42); Brett Lee 2/39 (4 overs)

Sri Lanka won by 6 wickets
Trent Bridge, Nottingham
Umpires: Billy Bowden (NZ) and Ian Gould (Eng)
Player of the match: Kumar Sangakkara (SL)

- Sri Lanka won the toss and elected to field.
- Sri Lanka advanced to the Super 8s as a result of this match.

10 June 2009
13:30
Scorecard

Sri Lanka; 192/5 (20 overs)	v	West Indies; 177/5 (20 overs)
Sanath Jayasuriya 81 (47); Lendl Simmons 4/19 (3 overs)		Dwayne Bravo 51 (38); Ajantha Mendis 2/25 (4 overs)

Sri Lanka won by 15 runs
Trent Bridge, Nottingham
Umpires: Billy Bowden (NZ) and Simon Taufel (Aus)
Player of the match: Sanath Jayasuriya (SL)

- West Indies won the toss and elected to field

Super 8 (Group F)

12 June 2009
13:30
Scorecard

Sri Lanka; 150/7 (20 overs)	v	Pakistan; 131/9 (20 overs)
Tillakaratne Dilshan 46 (39); Saeed Ajmal 2/26 (4 overs)		Younis Khan 50 (37); Lasith Malinga 3/17 (4 overs)

Sri Lanka won by 19 runs
Lord's, London
Umpires: Mark Benson (Eng) and Rudi Koertzen (SA)
Player of the match: Tillakaratne Dilshan (SL)

- Sri Lanka won the toss and elected to bat

14 June 2009
13:30
Scorecard

Sri Lanka; 144/9 (20 overs)	v	Ireland; 135/7 (20 overs)
Mahela Jayawardene 78 (53); Alex Cusack 4/18 (3 overs)		John Mooney 31* (21); Lasith Malinga 2/19 (4 overs)

Sri Lanka won by 9 runs
Lord's, London
Umpires: Marais Erasmus (SA) and Tony Hill (NZ)
Player of the match: Mahela Jayawardene (SL)

- Sri Lanka won the toss and elected to bat.

16 June 2009
13:30
Scorecard

Sri Lanka; 158/5 (20 overs)	v	New Zealand; 110 (17 overs)
Tillakaratne Dilshan 48 (37); DL Vettori 2/32 (4 overs)		Martin Guptill 43 (34); Ajantha Mendis 3/9 (3 overs)

Sri Lanka won by 48 runs
Trent Bridge, Nottingham
Umpires: Steve Davis (Aus) and Simon Taufel (Aus)
Player of the match: Ajantha Mendis (SL)

- Sri Lanka won the toss and elected to bat.
- Sri Lanka qualified for the semi-finals as a result of this match.

Knockout stage

Semi-final 2
19 June 2009
17:30 (D/N)
Scorecard

Sri Lanka; 158/5 (20 overs)	v	West Indies; 101 (17.4 overs)
Tillakaratne Dilshan 96* (57); Dwayne Bravo 2/32 (3 overs)		Chris Gayle 63* (50); Angelo Mathews 3/16 (4 overs)

Sri Lanka won by 57 runs
The Oval, London
Umpires: Aleem Dar (Pak) and Rudi Koertzen (SA)
Player of the match: Tillakaratne Dilshan (SL)

- West Indies won the toss and elected to field.

Final
21 June 2009
15:00
Scorecard

Sri Lanka; 138/6 (20 overs)	v	Pakistan; 139/2 (18.4 overs)
Kumar Sangakkara 64* (52); Abdul Razzaq 3/20 (3 overs)		Shahid Afridi 54* (40); Sanath Jayasuriya 1/8 (2 overs)

Pakistan won by 8 wickets
Lord's, London
Umpires: Daryl Harper (Aus) and Simon Taufel (Aus)
Player of the match: Shahid Afridi (Pak)

- Sri Lanka won the toss and elected to bat.

=== 2010 World Cup ===
Squad

- Kumar Sangakkara (c, wk)
- Mahela Jayawardene
- Dinesh Chandimal
- Chamara Kapugedera
- Tillakaratne Dilshan
- Sanath Jayasuriya
- Angelo Mathews
- Chinthaka Jayasinghe
- Thisara Perera
- Nuwan Kulasekara
- Lasith Malinga
- Ajantha Mendis
- Suraj Randiv
- Muttiah Muralitharan
- Chanaka Welegedara

Results

Group stage (Group B)			Super 8s (Group F)				Semifinal	Final	Overall Result
Opposition Result	Opposition Result	Rank	Opposition Result	Opposition Result	Opposition Result	Rank	Opposition Result	Opposition Result	Overall Result
New Zealand; Lost by 2 wickets	Zimbabwe; Won by 14 runs (DLS)	2	West Indies; Won by 57 runs	Australia; Lost by 81 runs	India; Won by 5 wickets	2	England; Lost by 7 wickets	Did not advance	Semi-final
Source: Cricinfo

Scorecards

Group stage (Group B)

30 April
13:00
Scorecard

Sri Lanka; 135/6 (20 overs)	v	New Zealand; 139/8 (19.5 overs)
Mahela Jayawardene 81 (51); Shane Bond 2/35 (4 overs)		Jesse Ryder 42 (27); Muttiah Muralitharan 2/25 (4 overs)

New Zealand won by 2 wickets
Providence Stadium, Guyana
Umpires: Steve Davis (Aus) and Rudi Koertzen (SA)
Player of the match: Nathan McCullum (NZ)

- Sri Lanka won the toss and elected to bat.

3 May
09:30
Scorecard

Sri Lanka; 173/7 (20 overs)	v	Zimbabwe; 29/1 (5 overs)
Mahela Jayawardene 100 (64); Ray Price 2/31 (4 overs)		Tatenda Taibu 12* (13)

Sri Lanka won by 14 runs (D/L)
Providence Stadium, Guyana
Umpires: Billy Doctrove (WI) and Ian Gould (Eng)
Player of the match: Mahela Jayawardene (SL)

- Sri Lanka won the toss and elected to bat.
- Rain reduced Zimbabwe's innings to 5 overs. According to the Duckworth–Lewis method, their target was 44 runs.
- Mahela Jayawardene became the fourth man, the third in the ICC World Twenty20 and the first Sri Lankan to score a century in a Twenty20 International.
- Sri Lanka qualified for the Super 8s as a result of this match.

Super 8 (Group F)

7 May
13:30
Scorecard

Sri Lanka; 195/3 (20 overs)	v	West Indies; 138/8 (20 overs)
Mahela Jayawardene 98* (56); Kemar Roach 2/27 (4 overs)		Ramnaresh Sarwan 28 (33); Ajantha Mendis 3/24 (4 overs)

Sri Lanka won by 57 runs
Kensington Oval, Bridgetown
Umpires: Rudi Koertzen (SA) and Simon Taufel (Aus)
Player of the match: Mahela Jayawardene (SL)

- Sri Lanka won the toss and elected to bat.

9 May
14:00
Scorecard

Australia; 168/5 (20 overs)	v	Sri Lanka; 87 (16.2 overs)
Cameron White 85* (49); Suraj Randiv 3/20 (4 overs)		Tillakaratne Dilshan 20 (12); Mitchell Johnson 3/15 (3.2 overs)

Australia won by 81 runs
Kensington Oval, Bridgetown
Umpires: Ian Gould (Eng) and Rudi Koertzen (SA)
Player of the match: Cameron White (Aus)

- Australia won the toss and elected to bat.

11 May
13:00
Scorecard

India; 163/5 (20 overs)	v	Sri Lanka; 167/5 (20 overs)
Suresh Raina 63 (47); Lasith Malinga 2/25 (4 overs)		Kumar Sangakkara 46 (33); Vinay Kumar 2/30 (4 overs)

Sri Lanka won by 5 wickets
Beausejour Stadium, Gros Islet
Umpires: Aleem Dar (Pak) and Steve Davis (Aus)
Player of the match: Angelo Mathews (SL)

- India won the toss and elected to bat.

Knockout stage

Semi-final 1
13 May
11:30
Scorecard

Sri Lanka; 128/6 (20 overs)	v	England; 132/3 (16 overs)
Angelo Mathews 58 (45); Stuart Broad 2/21 (4 overs)		Kevin Pietersen 42* (26); Thissara Perera 2/19 (2 overs)

England won by 7 wickets
Beausejour Stadium, Gros Islet
Umpires: Aleem Dar (Pak) and Simon Taufel (Aus)
Player of the match: Stuart Broad (Eng)

- Sri Lanka won the toss and elected to bat.

=== 2012 World Cup ===
Squad

- Mahela Jayawardene (c)
- Angelo Mathews (vc)
- Dinesh Chandimal (wk)
- Dilshan Munaweera
- Kumar Sangakkara (wk)
- Lahiru Thirimanne
- Akila Dananjaya
- Tillakaratne Dilshan
- Jeevan Mendis
- Thisara Perera
- Shaminda Eranga
- Rangana Herath
- Nuwan Kulasekara
- Lasith Malinga
- Ajantha Mendis

Results

Group stage (Group C)			Super 8s (Group E)				Semifinal	Final	Overall Result
Opposition Result	Opposition Result	Rank	Opposition Result	Opposition Result	Opposition Result	Rank	Opposition Result	Opposition Result	Overall Result
Zimbabwe; Won by 82 runs	South Africa; Lost by 32 runs	2	New Zealand; Tied (Won the S/O)	West Indies; Won by 9 wickets	England; Won by 19 runs	1	Pakistan; Won by 16 runs	West Indies; Lost by 36 runs	Runners-up
Source: Cricinfo

Scorecards

Group stage (Group C)

18 September
19:30 (D/N)
Scorecard

Sri Lanka; 182/4 (20 overs)	v	Zimbabwe; 100 (17.3 overs)
Kumar Sangakkara 44 (26); Graeme Cremer 1/27 (4 overs)		Hamilton Masakadza 20 (23); Ajantha Mendis 6/8 (4 overs)

Sri Lanka won by 82 runs
Mahinda Rajapaksa International Cricket Stadium, Sooriyawewa
Umpires: Ian Gould (Eng) and Rod Tucker (Aus)
Player of the match: Ajantha Mendis (SL)

- Zimbabwe won the toss and elected to field
- Twenty20 International Debutants: Dilshan Munaweera (SL) and Brian Vitori (Zim)
- Ajantha Mendis achieved the best bowling figures in Twenty20 Internationals

22 September
15:30 (D/N)
Scorecard

South Africa; 78/4 (7 overs)	v	Sri Lanka; 46/5 (7 overs)
AB de Villiers 30 (13); Nuwan Kulasekara 1/9 (1 over)		Kumar Sangakkara 13 (11); Dale Steyn 2/10 (2 overs)

South Africa won by 32 runs
Mahinda Rajapaksa International Cricket Stadium, Sooriyawewa
Umpires: Richard Kettleborough (Eng) and Rod Tucker (Aus)
Player of the match: AB de Villiers (SA)

- Sri Lanka won the toss and elected to field
- The match was reduced to 7 overs per side due to rain.

Super 8 (Group E)

27 September
15:30 (D/N)
Scorecard

New Zealand; 174/7 (20 overs)	v	Sri Lanka; 174/6 (20 overs)
Rob Nicol 58 (30); Akila Dananjaya 2/32 (4 overs)		Tillakaratne Dilshan 76 (53); James Franklin 2/34 (4 overs)

Match tied; Sri Lanka won the Super Over
Pallekele International Cricket Stadium, Pallekele
Umpires: Aleem Dar (Pak) and Simon Taufel (Aus)
Player of the match: Tillakaratne Dilshan (SL)

- New Zealand won the toss and elected to bat

29 September
19:30 (D/N)
Scorecard

West Indies; 129/5 (20 overs)	v	Sri Lanka; 130/1 (15.2 overs)
Marlon Samuels 50 (35); Nuwan Kulasekara 2/12 (4.0 overs)		Mahela Jayawardene 65* (49); Ravi Rampaul 1/39 (4 overs)

Sri Lanka won by 9 wickets
Pallekele International Cricket Stadium, Pallekele
Umpires: Aleem Dar (Pak) and Steve Davis (Aus)
Player of the match: Mahela Jayawardene (SL)

- West Indies won the toss and elected to bat

1 October
19:30 (D/N)
Scorecard

Sri Lanka; 169/6 (20 overs)	v	England; 150/9 (20 overs)
Mahela Jayawardene 42 (38); Stuart Broad 3/32 (4 overs)		Samit Patel 67 (48); Lasith Malinga 5/31 (4 overs)

Sri Lanka won by 19 runs
Pallekele International Cricket Stadium, Pallekele
Umpires: Steve Davis (Aus) and Simon Taufel (Aus)
Player of the match: Lasith Malinga (SL)

- England won the toss and elected to field
- Sri Lanka qualified for the semi-finals as a result of this match.

Knockout stage

Semi-final 1
4 October
19:00 (D/N)
Scorecard

Sri Lanka; 139/4 (20 overs)	v	Pakistan; 123/7 (20 overs)
Mahela Jayawardene 42 (36); Mohammed Hafeez 1/12 (2 overs)		Mohammed Hafeez 42 (40); Rangana Herath 3/25 (4 overs)

Sri Lanka won by 16 runs
R. Premadasa Stadium, Colombo
Attendance : 35,000
Umpires: Simon Taufel (Aus) and Rod Tucker (Aus)
Player of the match: Mahela Jayawardene (SL)

- Sri Lanka won the toss and elected to bat

Final
7 October
19:00 (D/N)
Scorecard

West Indies; 137/6 (20 overs)	v	Sri Lanka; 101 (18.4 overs)
Marlon Samuels 78 (56); Ajantha Mendis 4/12 (4 overs)		Mahela Jayawardene 33 (36); Sunil Narine 3/9 (3.4 overs)

West Indies won by 36 runs
R. Premadasa Stadium, Colombo
Attendance : 35,000
Umpires: Aleem Dar (Pak) and Simon Taufel (Aus)
Player of the match: Marlon Samuels (WI)

- West Indies won the toss and elected to bat

=== 2014 World Cup ===
Squad and kit

- Dinesh Chandimal (c, wk)
- Lasith Malinga (vc)
- Tillakaratne Dilshan
- Angelo Mathews
- Mahela Jayawardene
- Nuwan Kulasekara
- Rangana Herath
- Kumar Sangakkara (wk)
- Ajantha Mendis
- Thisara Perera
- Sachithra Senanayake
- Kusal Perera
- Suranga Lakmal
- Lahiru Thirimanne
- Seekkuge Prasanna

2014 kit

Results

First stage		Super 10 (Group 1)					Semifinal	Final	Overall Result
Opposition Result	Rank	Opposition Result	Opposition Result	Opposition Result	Opposition Result	Rank	Opposition Result	Opposition Result	Overall Result
Advanced to next stage directly		South Africa; Won by 5 runs	Netherlands; Won by 9 wickets	England; Lost by 6 wickets	New Zealand; Won by 59 runs	1	West Indies; Won by 27 runs (DLS)	India; Won by 6 wickets	Winners
Source: Cricinfo

Scorecards

Super 10 (Group 1)

22 March 2014
Scorecard

Sri Lanka; 165/7 (20 overs)	v	South Africa; 160/8 (20 overs)
Kusal Perera 61 (40); Imran Tahir 3/26 (4 overs)		JP Duminy 39 (30); Sachithra Senanayake 2/22 (4 overs)

Sri Lanka won by 5 runs
Zohur Ahmed Chowdhury Stadium, Chittagong

24 March 2014
Scorecard

Netherlands; 39 (10.3 overs)	v	Sri Lanka; 40/1 (5 overs)
Tom Cooper 16 (18); Ajantha Mendis 3/12 (2.3 overs)		Kusal Perera 14 (10); Ahsan Malik 1/18 (2 overs)

Sri Lanka won by 9 wickets
Zohur Ahmed Chowdhury Stadium, Chittagong

27 March 2014
Scorecard

Sri Lanka; 189/4 (20 overs)	v	England; 190/4 (19.2 overs)
Mahela Jayawardene 89 (51); Chris Jordan 2/28 (4 overs)		Alex Hales 116 (64); Nuwan Kulasekara 4/32 (4 overs)

England won by 6 wickets
Zohur Ahmed Chowdhury Stadium, Chittagong

31 March 2014
Scorecard

Sri Lanka; 119 (19.2 overs)	v	New Zealand; 60 (15.3 overs)
Mahela Jayawardene 25 (32); Trent Boult 3/20 (4 overs)		Kane Williamson 42 (43); Rangana Herath 5/3 (3.3 overs)

Sri Lanka won by 59 runs
Zohur Ahmed Chowdhury Stadium, Chittagong

Knockout stage

Semi-final 1
3 April
19:00 (D/N)
Scorecard

Sri Lanka; 160/6 (20 overs)	v	West Indies; 80/4 (13.5 overs)
Lahiru Thirimanne 44 (35); Krishmar Santokie 2/46 (4 overs)		Dwayne Bravo 30 (19); Lasith Malinga 2/5 (2 overs)

Sri Lanka won by 27 runs (D/L method)
Sher-e-Bangla National Cricket Stadium, Dhaka
Umpires: Richard Kettleborough (Eng) and Rod Tucker (Aus)
Player of the match: Angelo Mathews (SL)

- Sri Lanka won the toss and elected to bat
- Rain and hail ended the match after 13.5 overs in the West Indies' innings. Their par score was 107 runs according to the Duckworth–Lewis method.

Final
6 April
19:00 (D/N)
Scorecard

India; 130/4 (20 overs)	v	Sri Lanka; 134/4 (17.5 overs)
Virat Kohli 77 (58); Rangana Herath 1/23 (4 overs)		Kumar Sangakkara 52* (35); Mohit Sharma 1/18 (2 overs)

Sri Lanka won by 6 wickets
Sher-e-Bangla National Cricket Stadium, Dhaka
Umpires: Ian Gould (Eng) and Richard Kettleborough (Eng)
Player of the match: Kumar Sangakkara (SL)

- Sri Lanka won the toss and chose to field first.
- This was the last Twenty20 International for Kumar Sangakkara and Mahela Jayawardene
- Mahela Jayawardene became the first batsman to reach 1000 runs in ICC World Twenty20

=== 2016 World Cup ===
Squad and kit

- Angelo Mathews (c)
- Dinesh Chandimal (wk)
- Tillakaratne Dilshan
- Lahiru Thirimanne
- Milinda Siriwardana
- Shehan Jayasuriya
- Thisara Perera
- Dasun Shanaka
- Rangana Herath
- Jeffrey Vandersay
- Nuwan Kulasekara
- Dushmantha Chameera
- Suranga Lakmal
- Sachithra Senanayake
- Chamara Kapugedera

2016 kit

Results

First stage		Super 10 (Group 1)					Semifinal	Final	Overall Result
Opposition Result	Rank	Opposition Result	Opposition Result	Opposition Result	Opposition Result	Rank	Opposition Result	Opposition Result	Overall Result
Advanced to next stage directly		Afghanistan; Won by 6 wickets	West Indies; Lost by 6 wickets	England; Lost by 10 runs	South Africa; Lost by 8 wickets	4	Did not advance		Super 10
Source: Cricinfo

Scorecards

Super 10 (Group 1)

17 March
19:30 (D/N)
Scorecard

Afghanistan; 153/7 (20 overs)	v	Sri Lanka; 155/4 (18.5 overs)
Asghar Stanikzai 62 (47); Thisara Perera 3/33 (4 overs)		Tillakaratne Dilshan 83* (56); Mohammad Nabi 1/25 (4 overs)

Sri Lanka won by 6 wickets
Eden Gardens, Kolkata
Umpires: Bruce Oxenford (Aus) and Joel Wilson (WI)
Player of the match: Tillakaratne Dilshan (SL)

- Afghanistan won the toss and elected to bat.

20 March
19:30 (D/N)
Scorecard

Sri Lanka; 122/9 (20 overs)	v	West Indies; 127/3 (18.2 overs)
Thisara Perera 40 (29); Samuel Badree 3/12 (4 overs)		Andre Fletcher 84* (64); Milinda Siriwardana 2/33 (4 overs)

West Indies won by 7 wickets
M. Chinnaswamy Stadium, Bengaluru
Umpires: Aleem Dar (Pak) and Johan Cloete (SA)
Player of the match: Andre Fletcher (WI)

- West Indies won the toss and elected to field.

26 March
19:30 (D/N)
Scorecard

England; 171/4 (20 overs)	v	Sri Lanka; 161/8 (20 overs)
Jos Buttler 66* (37); Jeffrey Vandersay 2/26 (4 overs)		Angelo Mathews 73* (54); Chris Jordan 4/28 (4 overs)

England won by 10 runs
Feroz Shah Kotla Ground, Delhi
Umpires: Paul Reiffel (Aus) and Rod Tucker (Aus)
Player of the match: Jos Buttler (Eng)

- Sri Lanka won the toss and elected to field.
- Sri Lanka were eliminated as a result of this match.

28 March
19:30 (D/N)
Scorecard

Sri Lanka; 120 (19.3 overs)	v	South Africa; 122/2 (17.4 overs)
Tillakaratne Dilshan 36 (40); Kyle Abbott 2/14 (3.3 overs)		Hashim Amla 56* (52); Suranga Lakmal 1/28 (3.4 overs)

South Africa won by 8 wickets
Feroz Shah Kotla Ground, Delhi
Umpires: Sundaram Ravi (Ind) and Rod Tucker (Aus)
Player of the match: Aaron Phangiso (SA)

- South Africa won the toss and elected to field.

=== 2021 World Cup ===
Squad and kit

- Dasun Shanaka (c)
- Dhananjaya de Silva (vc)
- Dinesh Chandimal (wk)
- Kusal Perera
- Avishka Fernando
- Pathum Nissanka
- Bhanuka Rajapaksa
- Charith Asalanka
- Chamika Karunaratne
- Wanindu Hasaranga
- Maheesh Theekshana
- Dushmantha Chameera
- Binura Fernando
- Lahiru Kumara
- Akila Dananjaya

Home kit

Away kit

Results

First round (Group A)				Super 12 (Group 1)						Semifinal	Final	Overall Result
Opposition Result	Opposition Result	Opposition Result	Rank	Opposition Result	Opposition Result	Opposition Result	Opposition Result	Opposition Result	Rank	Opposition Result	Opposition Result	Overall Result
Namibia; Won by 7 wickets	Ireland; Won by 70 runs	Netherlands; Won by 8 wickets	1	Bangladesh; Won by 5 wickets	Australia; Lost by 7 wickets	South Africa; Lost by 4 wickets	England; Lost by 26 runs	West Indies; Won by 20 runs	4	Did not advance		Super 12
Source: Cricinfo

Scorecards

First round (Group A)

18 October 2021
18:00 (N)
Scorecard

Namibia; 96 (19.3 overs)	v	Sri Lanka; 100/3 (13.3 overs)
Craig Williams 29 (36); Maheesh Theekshana 3/25 (4 overs)		Bhanuka Rajapaksa 42* (27); JJ Smit 1/7 (1 over)

Sri Lanka won by 7 wickets
Sheikh Zayed Cricket Stadium, Abu Dhabi
Umpires: Adrian Holdstock (SA) and Paul Reiffel (Aus)
Player of the match: Maheesh Theekshana (SL)

- Sri Lanka won the toss and elected to field.

20 October 2021
18:00 (N)
Scorecard

Sri Lanka; 171/7 (20 overs)	v	Ireland; 101 (18.3 overs)
Wanindu Hasaranga 71 (47); Josh Little 4/23 (4 overs)		Andrew Balbirnie 41 (39); Maheesh Theekshana 3/17 (4 overs)

Sri Lanka won by 70 runs
Sheikh Zayed Cricket Stadium, Abu Dhabi
Umpires: Nitin Menon (Ind) and Paul Wilson (Aus)
Player of the match: Wanindu Hasaranga (SL)

- Ireland won the toss and elected to field.
- Sri Lanka qualified for the Super 12 stage of the tournament as a result of this match,

22 October 2021
18:00 (N)
Scorecard

Netherlands; 44 (10 overs)	v	Sri Lanka; 45/2 (7.1 overs)
Colin Ackermann 11 (9); Lahiru Kumara 3/7 (3 overs)		Kusal Perera 33* (24); Brandon Glover 1/12 (3 overs)

Sri Lanka won by 8 wickets
Sharjah Cricket Stadium, Sharjah
Umpires: Richard Illingworth (Eng) and Joel Wilson (WI)
Player of the match: Lahiru Kumara (SL)

- Sri Lanka won the toss and elected to field.

Super 12 (Group 1)

24 October 2021
14:00 (N)
Scorecard

Bangladesh; 171/4 (20 overs)	v	Sri Lanka; 172/5 (18.5 overs)
Mohammad Naim 62 (52); Chamika Karunaratne 1/12 (3 overs)		Charith Asalanka 80* (49); Shakib Al Hasan 2/17 (3 overs)

Sri Lanka won by 5 wickets
Sharjah Cricket Stadium, Sharjah
Umpires: Adrian Holdstock (SA) and Joel Wilson (WI)
Player of the match: Charith Asalanka (SL)

- Sri Lanka won the toss and elected to field.

28 October 2021
18:00 (N)
Scorecard

Sri Lanka; 154/6 (20 overs)	v	Australia; 155/3 (17 overs)
Kusal Perera 35 (25); Adam Zampa 2/12 (4 overs)		David Warner 65 (42); Wanindu Hasaranga 2/22 (4 overs)

Australia won by 7 wickets
Dubai International Cricket Stadium, Dubai
Umpires: Aleem Dar (Pak) and Richard Illingworth (Eng)
Player of the match: Adam Zampa (Aus)

- Australia won the toss and elected to field.

30 October 2021
14:00
Scorecard

Sri Lanka; 142 (20 overs)	v	South Africa; 146/6 (19.5 overs)
Pathum Nissanka 72 (58); Tabraiz Shamsi 3/17 (4 overs)		Temba Bavuma 46 (46); Wanindu Hasaranga 3/20 (4 overs)

South Africa won by 4 wickets
Sharjah Cricket Stadium, Sharjah
Umpires: Joel Wilson (WI) and Paul Wilson (Aus)
Player of the match: Tabraiz Shamsi (SA)

- South Africa won the toss and elected to field.
- Wanindu Hasaranga became the first bowler for Sri Lanka to take a hat-trick in a T20 World Cup match.

1 November 2021
18:00 (N)
Scorecard

England; 163/4 (20 overs)	v	Sri Lanka; 137 (19 overs)
Jos Buttler 101* (67); Wanindu Hasaranga 3/21 (4 overs)		Wanindu Hasaranga 34 (21); Moeen Ali 2/15 (3 overs)

England won by 26 runs
Sharjah Cricket Stadium, Sharjah
Umpires: Adrian Holdstock (SA) and Rod Tucker (Aus)
Player of the match: Jos Buttler (Eng)

- Sri Lanka won the toss and elected to field.
- Wanindu Hasaranga (SL) took his 50th wicket in T20Is.

4 November 2021
18:00 (N)
Scorecard

Sri Lanka; 189/3 (20 overs)	v	West Indies; 169/8 (20 overs)
Charith Asalanka 68 (41); Andre Russell 2/33 (4 overs)		Shimron Hetmyer 81* (54); Wanindu Hasaranga 2/19 (4 overs)

Sri Lanka won by 20 runs
Sheikh Zayed Cricket Stadium, Abu Dhabi
Umpires: Aleem Dar (Pak) and Langton Rusere (Zim)
Player of the match: Charith Asalanka (SL)

- West Indies won the toss and elected to field.

=== 2022 World Cup ===
Squad and kit

- Dasun Shanaka (c)
- Pathum Nissanka
- Kusal Mendis (wk)
- Charith Asalanka
- Bhanuka Rajapaksa
- Dhananjaya de Silva
- Wanindu Hasaranga
- Maheesh Theekshana
- Jeffrey Vandersay
- Chamika Karunaratne
- Ashen Bandara
- Lahiru Kumara
- Asitha Fernando
- Pramod Madushan
- Kasun Rajitha

Home kit

Away kit

Results

First round (Group A)				Super 12 (Group 1)						Semifinal	Final	Overall Result
Opposition Result	Opposition Result	Opposition Result	Rank	Opposition Result	Opposition Result	Opposition Result	Opposition Result	Opposition Result	Rank	Opposition Result	Opposition Result	Overall Result
Namibia; Lost by 55 runs	United Arab Emirates; Won by 79 runs	Netherlands; Won by 16 runs	1	Ireland; Won by 9 wickets	Australia; Lost by 7 wickets	New Zealand; Lost by 65 runs	Afghanistan; Won by 6 wickets	England; Lost by 4 wickets	4	Did not advance		Super 12
Source: Cricinfo

Scorecards

First round (Group A)

16 October 2022
15:00
Scorecard

Namibia; 163/7 (20 overs)	v	Sri Lanka; 108 (19 overs)
Jan Frylinck 44 (28); Pramod Madushan 2/37 (4 overs)		Dasun Shanaka 29 (23); David Wiese 2/16 (4 overs)

Namibia won by 55 runs
Kardinia Park, Geelong
Umpires: Rod Tucker (Aus) and Joel Wilson (WI)
Player of the match: Jan Frylinck (Nam)

- Sri Lanka won the toss and elected to field.

18 October 2022
19:00 (N)
Scorecard

Sri Lanka; 152/8 (20 overs)	v	United Arab Emirates; 73 (17.1 overs)
Pathum Nissanka 74 (60); Karthik Meiyappan 3/19 (4 overs)		Aayan Afzal Khan 19 (21); Wanindu Hasaranga 3/8 (4 overs)

Sri Lanka won by 79 runs
Kardinia Park, Geelong
Umpires: Marais Erasmus (SA) and Rod Tucker (Aus)
Player of the match: Pathum Nissanka (SL)

- United Arab Emirates won the toss and elected to field.

20 October 2022
15:00
Scorecard

Sri Lanka; 162/6 (20 overs)	v	Netherlands; 146/9 (20 overs)
Kusal Mendis 79 (44); Paul van Meekeren 2/25 (4 overs)		Max O'Dowd 71* (53); Wanindu Hasaranga 3/28 (4 overs)

Sri Lanka won by 16 runs
Kardinia Park, Geelong
Umpires: Marais Erasmus (SA) and Joel Wilson (WI)
Player of the match: Kusal Mendis (SL)

- Sri Lanka won the toss and elected to bat.
- Sri Lanka qualified for the Super 12 as a result of this match.

Super 12 (Group 1)

23 October 2022
15:00
Scorecard

Ireland; 128/8 (20 overs)	v	Sri Lanka; 133/1 (15 overs)
Harry Tector 45 (42); Maheesh Theekshana 2/19 (4 overs)		Kusal Mendis 68* (43); Gareth Delany 1/28 (4 overs)

Sri Lanka won by 9 wickets
Bellerive Oval, Hobart
Umpires: Chris Gaffaney (NZ) and Ahsan Raza (Pak)
Player of the match: Kusal Mendis (SL)

- Ireland won the toss and elected to bat.

25 October 2022
19:00 (N)
Scorecard

Sri Lanka; 157/6 (20 overs)	v	Australia; 158/3 (16.3 overs)
Pathum Nissanka 40 (45); Glenn Maxwell 1/5 (1 over)		Marcus Stoinis 59* (18); Dhananjaya de Silva 1/18 (2.1 overs)

Australia won by 7 wickets
Perth Stadium, Perth
Umpires: Marais Erasmus (SA) and Richard Illingworth (Eng)
Player of the match: Marcus Stoinis (Aus)

- Australia won the toss and elected to field.

29 October 2022
19:00 (N)
Scorecard

New Zealand; 167/7 (20 overs)	v	Sri Lanka; 102 (19.2 overs)
Glenn Phillips 104 (64); Kasun Rajitha 2/23 (4 overs)		Dasun Shanaka 35 (32); Trent Boult 4/13 (4 overs)

New Zealand won by 65 runs
Sydney Cricket Ground, Sydney
Umpires: Michael Gough (Eng) and Paul Wilson (Aus)
Player of the match: Glenn Phillips (NZ)

- New Zealand won the toss and elected to bat.

1 November 2022
14:00
Scorecard

Afghanistan; 144/8 (20 overs)	v	Sri Lanka; 148/4 (18.3 overs)
Rahmanullah Gurbaz 28 (24); Wanindu Hasaranga 3/13 (4 overs)		Dhananjaya de Silva 66* (42); Mujeeb Ur Rahman 2/24 (4 overs)

Sri Lanka won by 6 wickets
The Gabba, Brisbane
Umpires: Ahsan Raza (Pak) and Rod Tucker (Aus)
Player of the match: Wanindu Hasaranga (SL)

- Afghanistan won the toss and elected to bat.

5 November 2022
19:00 (N)
Scorecard

Sri Lanka; 141/8 (20 overs)	v	England; 144/6 (19.4 overs)
Pathum Nissanka 67 (45); Mark Wood 3/26 (3 overs)		Alex Hales 47 (30); Wanindu Hasaranga 2/23 (4 overs)

England won by 4 wickets
Sydney Cricket Ground, Sydney
Umpires: Paul Reiffel (Aus) and Paul Wilson (Aus)
Player of the match: Adil Rashid (Eng)

- Sri Lanka won the toss and elected to bat.

=== 2024 World Cup ===
Squad and kit

- Wanindu Hasaranga (c)
- Charith Asalanka (vc)
- Kusal Mendis (wk)
- Pathum Nissanka
- Sadeera Samarawickrama
- Angelo Mathews
- Dasun Shanaka
- Dhananjaya de Silva
- Kamindu Mendis
- Maheesh Theekshana
- Dunith Wellalage
- Dushmantha Chameera
- Nuwan Thushara
- Matheesha Pathirana
- Dilshan Madushanka

2024 kit

Results

Group stage (Group D)					Super 8		Semifinal	Final	Overall Result
Opposition Result	Opposition Result	Opposition Result	Opposition Result	Rank	Opposition Result	Rank	Opposition Result	Opposition Result	Overall Result
South Africa; Lost by 6 wickets	Bangladesh; Lost by 2 wickets	Nepal; Match abandoned	Netherlands; Won by 83 runs	3	Did not advance				Group stage
Source: Cricinfo

Scorecards

Group stage (Group D)

3 June 2024
10:30 UTC−4
Scorecard

Sri Lanka; 77 (19.1 overs)	v	South Africa; 80/4 (16.2 overs)
Kusal Mendis 19 (30); Anrich Nortje 4/7 (4 overs)		Quinton de Kock 20 (27); Wanindu Hasaranga 2/22 (3.2 overs)

South Africa won by 6 wickets
Nassau County International Cricket Stadium, East Meadow
Umpires: Chris Brown (NZ) and Richard Kettleborough (Eng)
Player of the match: Anrich Nortje (SA)

- Sri Lanka won the toss and elected to bat.
- This was the first T20I match played at this venue.
- This was Sri Lanka's lowest total in T20Is.

7 June 2024
19:30 UTC−5 (N)
Scorecard

Sri Lanka; 124/9 (20 overs)	v	Bangladesh; 125/8 (19 overs)
Pathum Nissanka 47 (28); Mustafizur Rahman 3/17 (4 overs)		Towhid Hridoy 40 (20); Nuwan Thushara 4/18 (4 overs)

Bangladesh won by 2 wickets
Grand Prairie Stadium, Dallas
Umpires: Michael Gough (Eng) and Paul Reiffel (Aus)
Player of the match: Rishad Hossain (Ban)

- Bangladesh won the toss and elected to field.

11 June 2024
19:30 UTC−4 (N)
Scorecard

Nepal	v	Sri Lanka

Match abandoned
Central Broward Park, Lauderhill
Umpires: Chris Gaffaney (NZ) and Richard Kettleborough (Eng)

- No toss.
- No play was possible due to rain.

16 June 2024
20:30 UTC−4 (N)
Scorecard

Sri Lanka; 201/6 (20 overs)	v	Netherlands; 118 (16.4 overs)
Charith Asalanka 46 (21); Logan van Beek 2/45 (4 overs)		Michael Levitt 31 (23); Nuwan Thushara 3/24 (3.4 overs)

Sri Lanka won by 83 runs
Daren Sammy Cricket Ground, Gros Islet
Umpires: Allahudien Paleker (SA) and Alex Wharf (Eng)
Player of the match: Charith Asalanka (SL)

- Netherlands won the toss and elected to field.

=== 2026 World Cup ===
Squad and kit

- Dasun Shanaka (c)
- Dushmantha Chameera
- Dunith Wellalage
- Kusal Mendis (wk)
- Pathum Nissanka
- Kamindu Mendis
- Kamil Mishara
- Wanindu Hasaranga
- Pavan Rathnayake
- Kusal Perera (wk)
- Maheesh Theekshana
- Charith Asalanka
- Matheesha Pathirana
- Janith Liyanage
- Eshan Malinga

2026 kit

Results

Group stage (Group B)					Super 8 (Group 2)				Semifinal	Final	Overall Result
Opposition Result	Opposition Result	Opposition Result	Opposition Result	Rank	Opposition Result	Opposition Result	Opposition Result	Rank	Opposition Result	Opposition Result	Overall Result
Ireland; Won by 20 runs	Oman; Won by 105 runs	Australia; Won by 8 wickets	Zimbabwe; Lost by 6 wickets	2	England; Lost by 51 runs	New Zealand; Lost by 61 runs	Pakistan; Lost by 5 runs	4	Did not advance		Super 8
Source: Cricinfo

Scorecards

Group stage (Group B)

Match 6
8 February 2026
19:00 UTC+5:30 (N)
Scorecard

Sri Lanka; 163/6 (20 overs)	v	Ireland; 143 (19.5 overs)
Kusal Mendis 56* (43); George Dockrell 2/17 (4 overs)		Harry Tector 40 (34); Maheesh Theekshana 3/23 (4 overs)

Sri Lanka won by 20 runs
R. Premadasa Stadium, Colombo
Attendance: 23,429
Umpires: Ahsan Raza (Pak) and Asif Yaqoob (Pak)
Player of the match: Kamindu Mendis (SL)

- Ireland won the toss and elected to field.

Match 16
12 February 2026
11:00 UTC+5:30
Scorecard

Sri Lanka; 225/5 (20 overs)	v	Oman; 120/9 (20 overs)
Kusal Mendis 61 (45); Jiten Ramanandi 2/41 (4 overs)		Mohammad Nadeem 53* (56); Maheesh Theekshana 2/11 (4 overs)

Sri Lanka won by 105 runs
Pallekele International Cricket Stadium, Kandy
Umpires: Richard Kettleborough (Eng) and Wayne Knights (NZ)
Player of the match: Pavan Rathnayake (SL)

- Oman won the toss and elected to field.
- This was the first time Oman and Sri Lanka faced each other in T20Is.
- Dasun Shanaka scored the fastest half-century (19 balls) in T20Is for Sri Lanka and equalled with Rohit Sharma for the fastest half-century by a captain in the T20 World Cup.
- Mohammad Nadeem (Oma) became the oldest player (43 years and 161 days) to score a half-century in a Men's T20 World Cup.

Match 30
16 February 2026
19:00 UTC+5:30 (N)
Scorecard

Australia; 181 (20 overs)	v	Sri Lanka; 184/2 (18 overs)
Travis Head 56 (29); Dushan Hemantha 3/37 (4 overs)		Pathum Nissanka 100* (52); Marcus Stoinis 2/46 (4 overs)

Sri Lanka won by 8 wickets
Pallekele International Cricket Stadium, Kandy
Umpires: Richard Kettleborough (Eng) and Ahsan Raza (Pak)
Player of the match: Pathum Nissanka (SL)

- Sri Lanka won the toss and elected to field.
- Pathum Nissanka became the second player from Sri Lanka to score a century in T20 World Cup and the second Sri Lankan to score 2,500 T20I runs. This was the first century in the 2026 tournament and 12th overall in the T20 World Cup history.
- This was the highest successful run chase by Sri Lanka in T20 World Cups.
- Sri Lanka qualified for the Super 8 as a result of this match.

Match 38
19 February 2026
15:00 UTC+5:30 (D/N)
Scorecard

Sri Lanka; 178/7 (20 overs)	v	Zimbabwe; 182/4 (19.3 overs)
Pathum Nissanka 62 (41); Graeme Cremer 2/27 (4 overs)		Brian Bennett 63* (48); Dushan Hemantha 2/36 (4 overs)

Zimbabwe won by 6 wickets
R. Premadasa Stadium, Colombo
Umpires: Richard Kettleborough (Eng) and Asif Yaqoob (Pak)
Player of the match: Sikandar Raza (Zim)

- Sri Lanka won the toss and elected to bat.

Super 8 (Group 2)

Match 42
22 February 2026
15:00 UTC+5:30 (D/N)
Scorecard

England; 146/9 (20 overs)	v	Sri Lanka; 95 (16.4 overs)
Phil Salt 62 (40); Dunith Wellalage 3/26 (4 overs)		Dasun Shanaka 30 (24); Will Jacks 3/22 (4 overs)

England won by 51 runs
Pallekele Cricket Stadium, Kandy
Umpires: Adrian Holdstock (SA) and Ahsan Raza (Pak)
Player of the match: Will Jacks (Eng)

- Sri Lanka won the toss and elected to field.

Match 46
25 February 2026
19:00 UTC+5:30 (N)
Scorecard

New Zealand; 168/7 (20 overs)	v	Sri Lanka; 107/8 (20 overs)
Mitchell Santner 47 (26); Maheesh Theekshana 3/30 (4 overs)		Kamindu Mendis 31 (23); Rachin Ravindra 4/27 (4 overs)

New Zealand won by 61 runs
R. Premadasa Stadium, Colombo
Umpires: Allahudien Paleker (SA) and Asif Yaqoob (Pak)
Player of the match: Rachin Ravindra (NZ)

- Sri Lanka won the toss and elected to field.
- Mitchell Santner (NZ) scored his 1,000th run in T20Is. He also became the first cricketer from New Zealand to score 1000 runs and take 100 wickets in T20Is.
- Sri Lanka were eliminated as a result of this match.

Match 50
28 February 2026
19:00 UTC+5:30 (N)
Scorecard

Pakistan; 212/8 (20 overs)	v	Sri Lanka; 207/6 (20 overs)
Sahibzada Farhan 100 (60); Dilshan Madushanka 3/33 (4 overs)		Dasun Shanaka 76* (31); Abrar Ahmed 3/23 (4 overs)

Pakistan won by 5 runs
Pallekele Cricket Stadium, Kandy
Umpires: Sam Nogajski (Aus) and Rod Tucker (Aus)
Player of the match: Sahibzada Farhan (Pak)

- Sri Lanka won the toss and elected to field.
- Sahibzada Farhan and Fakhar Zaman's 176-run partnership for Pakistan was the highest partnership ever in the T20 World Cup.
- Sahibzada Farhan (Pak) broke Virat Kohli's 2014 record for most runs scored in a single edition of the T20 World Cup (383 runs). He also became the first batsman to score two centuries in a single edition of the T20 World Cup. This was the fifth century in the 2026 tournament and 16th overall in the T20 World Cup history.
- Abrar Ahmed (Pak) took his 50th wicket in T20Is.
- Dasun Shanaka became the first Sri Lankan to hit 100 sixes in T20Is and the first captain to score 20 sixes in the T20 World Cup. He also broke Kusal Perera's 2017 record for most sixes in a T20I innings for Sri Lanka (8 sixes).
- New Zealand qualified for their fifth T20 World Cup semi-final while Pakistan were eliminated as a result of this match.

== Records and statistics ==
=== Team records ===
Highest innings totals

Score	Opponent	Venue	Season
260/6 (20 overs)	Kenya	Johannesburg	2007
201/6 (20 overs)	Netherlands	Gros Islet	2024
195/3 (20 overs)	West Indies	Bridgetown	2010
192/5 (20 overs)	West Indies	Nottingham	2009
189/4 (20 overs)	England	Chattogram	2014
Last updated: 16 June 2024

=== Batting statistics ===
Most runs

Runs	Player	Mat	Inn	HS	Avg	100s	50s	Period
1016	Mahela Jayawardene	31	31	100	39.07	1	6	2007–2014
897	Tillakaratne Dilshan	35	34	96*	30.93	—N/a	6	2007–2016
661	Kumar Sangakkara	31	30	68	25.42	—N/a	4	2007–2014
521	Angelo Mathews	32	25	73*	37.21	—N/a	2	2009–2024
485	Pathum Nissanka	18	18	74	26.94	—N/a	5	2021–2024
Last updated: 16 June 2024

Highest partnerships

Runs	Players	Opposition	Venue	Season
166 (2nd wicket)	Kumar Sangakkara (68) & Mahela Jayawardene (86)	v West Indies	Bridgetown	2010
145 (2nd wicket)	Mahela Jayawardene (89) & Tillakaratne Dilshan (50)	v England	Chattogram	2014
124 (1st wicket)	Sanath Jayasuriya (81) & Tillakaratne Dilshan (38)	v West Indies	Nottingham	2009
123 (4th wicket)	Wanindu Hasaranga (71) & Pathum Nissanka (48)	v Ireland	Abu Dhabi	2021
108* (2nd wicket)	Kumar Sangakkara (59) & Mahela Jayawardene (39)	v West Indies	Pallekele	2012
Last updated: 16 June 2024

=== Bowling statistics ===
Most wickets

Wickets	Player	Matches	Avg.	Econ.	BBI	4W	5W	Period
38	Lasith Malinga	31	20.07	7.43	5/31	0	1	2007–2014
37	Wanindu Hasaranga	19	11.72	6.00	3/8	0	0	2021–2024
35	Ajantha Mendis	21	15.02	6.70	6/8	1	1	2009–2014
19	Angelo Mathews	32	27.21	6.51	3/16	0	0	2009–2024
18	Maheesh Theekshana	18	21.77	6.20	3/17	0	0	2021–2024
Last updated: 16 June 2024
