= 2022 Dambulla Aura season =

Dambulla based franchise cricket team in Sri Lanka

Dambulla Aura
2022 season
- Official logo of Dambulla Aura
- Coach: Mickey Arthur
- Captain: Dasun Shanaka
- Tournament performance: League stage (5th)
- Most runs: Jordan Cox (205)
- Most wickets: Matthew Forde (7)

The Dambulla Aura (DA) is a franchise cricket team that competes in 2022 Lanka Premier League. The team is based in Dambulla, Central Province, Sri Lanka. In September 2021, Dambulla Viiking changed their name to Dambulla Giants after having new owners. In 2022 Dambulla team changed their name to Dambulla Aura. The team was captained by Dasun Shanaka and coached by Mickey Arthur.

== Squad ==
- Players with international caps are listed in **bold**
- Ages given as of 6 December 2022, the date the first match of the tournament was played

No.	Name	Nationality	Date of birth	Batting style	Bowling style	Notes
Batters
54	**Bhanuka Rajapaksa**	Sri Lanka	24 October 1991 (aged 31)	Left-handed	Right-arm medium	
46	**Haider Ali**	Pakistan	2 October 2000 (aged 22)	Right-handed	–	Overseas player
	Tom Abell	England	5 March 1993 (aged 29)	Right-handed	Right-arm Medium	Overseas player
	Lasith Croospulle	Sri Lanka	4 October 1998 (aged 24)	Right-handed	Right-arm off break	
	Chamindu Wickramasinghe	Sri Lanka	6 September 2002 (aged 20)	Left-handed	Right-arm medium	
All-rounders
7	**Dasun Shanaka**	Sri Lanka	9 September 1991 (aged 31)	Right-handed	Right-arm medium	Captain
	**Sikandar Raza**	Zimbabwe	24 April 1986 (aged 36)	Right-handed	Right-arm off break	Overseas player
25	**Ramesh Mendis**	Sri Lanka	7 July 1995 (aged 27)	Right-handed	Right-arm off break	
50	**Chaturanga de Silva**	Sri Lanka	17 January 1990 (aged 32)	Left-handed	Slow left arm orthodox	
	**Lahiru Madushanka**	Sri Lanka	12 September 1992 (aged 30)	Right-handed	Right-arm fast-medium	
27	Tharindu Ratnayake	Sri Lanka	18 April 1996 (aged 26)	Left-handed	Right-arm off break	
6	Sachitha Jayathilake	Sri Lanka	24 February 1997 (aged 25)	Right-handed	Right-arm leg break	
	Dushan Hemantha	Sri Lanka	24 May 1994 (aged 28)	Right-handed	Right-arm leg break	
	Ravindu Fernando	Sri Lanka	3 November 1999 (aged 23)	Right-handed	Right-arm off break	
	Shevon Daniel	Sri Lanka	15 March 2004 (aged 18)	Left-handed	Right-arm off break	
Wicket-keepers
46	Jordan Cox	England	21 October 2000 (aged 22)	Right-handed	Right arm offbreak	Overseas player
Spin bowlers
	Dilum Sudeera	Sri Lanka	4 October 2000 (aged 22)	Right-handed	Slow left arm orthodox	
	Noor Ahmad	Afghanistan	3 January 2005 (aged 17)	Right-handed	Left-arm unorthodox spin	Overseas player
Pace bowlers
47	**Paul van Meekeren**	Netherlands	15 January 1993 (aged 29)	Right-handed	Right-arm fast-medium	Overseas player
50	**Lahiru Kumara**	Sri Lanka	13 February 1997 (aged 25)	Left-handed	Right-arm fast	
	**Pramod Madushan**	Sri Lanka	14 December 1993 (aged 28)	Right-handed	Right-arm medium-fast	
50	Kalana Perera	Sri Lanka	28 July 2000 (aged 22)	Left-handed	Left-arm medium-fast	
50	Matthew Forde	West Indies	28 July 2000 (aged 22)	Right-handed	Right-arm medium-fast	Overseas player

- Source: ESPNcricinfo

== Administration and support staff ==
Position	Name
Head Coach	Mickey Arthur
Assistant coach	Avishka Gunawardane
Fielding coach	Ruvin Peiris
Bowling coach	Shaun Pollock

== Teams and standings ==
=== League table ===
Pos	Team	Pld	W	L	NR	Pts	NRR
1	Kandy Falcons (3rd)	8	7	1	0	14	1.884
2	Jaffna Kings (C)	8	6	2	0	12	1.010
3	Colombo Stars (R)	8	3	5	0	6	−0.847
4	Galle Gladiators (4th)	8	2	6	0	4	−0.936
5	Dambulla Aura	8	2	6	0	4	−1.198

Source: ESPN Cricinfo

== League stage ==
Match 3
7 December 2022
15:00 (D/N)
Scorecard

Dambulla Aura; 121/9 (20 overs)	v	Jaffna Kings; 122/1 (15.4 overs)
Jordan Cox 43 (22); Mahesh Theekshana 3/20 (4 overs)		Sadeera Samarawickrama 62* (44); Noor Ahmad 1/28 (3.4 overs)

Jaffna Kings won by 9 wickets
Mahinda Rajapaksa International Cricket Stadium, Hambantota
Umpires: Lyndon Hannibal (SL) and Ranmore Martinesz (SL)
Player of the match: Sadeera Samarawickrama (Jaffna Kings)

- Dambulla Aura won the toss and elected to bat.

Match 5
8 December 2022
15:00 (D/N)
Scorecard

Colombo Stars; 165/9 (20 overs)	v	Dambulla Aura; 156/7 (20 overs)
Niroshan Dickwella 62 (41); Lahiru Kumara 4/36 (4 overs)		Tom Abell 33 (22); Suranga Lakmal 2/29 (4 overs)

Colombo Stars won by 9 runs
Mahinda Rajapaksa International Cricket Stadium, Hambantota
Umpires: Chandrika Amarasinghe (SL) and Lyndon Hannibal (SL)
Player of the match: Niroshan Dickwella (Colombo Stars)

- Colombo Stars won the toss and elected to bat.

Match 8
11 December 2022
19:30 (N)
Scorecard

Jaffna Kings; 240/4 (20 overs)	v	Dambulla Aura; 189/8 (20 overs)
Rahmanullah Gurbaz 73 (35); Lahiru Kumara 2/56 (4 overs)		Dasun Shanaka 44 (23); Binura Fernando 4/22 (4 overs)

Jaffna Kings won by 51 runs
Pallekele International Cricket Stadium, Kandy
Umpires: Gregory Brathwaite (WI) and Prageeth Rambukwella (SL)
Player of the match: Rahmanullah Gurbaz (Jaffna Kings)

- Dambulla Aura won the toss and elected to field.

Match 11
13 December 2022
15:00 (D/N)
Scorecard

Kandy Falcons; 193/3 (20 overs)	v	Dambulla Aura; 116 (14.2 overs)
Kamindu Mendis 58 (40); Chaturanga de Silva 1/26 (3 overs)		Chaturanga de Silva 25 (15); Carlos Brathwaite 3/25 (3 overs); Chamindu Wijesinghe 3/25 (3 overs)

Kandy Falcons won by 77 runs
Pallekele International Cricket Stadium, Kandy
Umpires: Gregory Brathwaite (WI) and Ravindra Kottahachchi (SL)
Player of the match: Kamindu Mendis (Kandy Falcons)

- Kandy Falcons won the toss and elected to bat.

Match 14
14 December 2022
19:30 (N)
Scorecard

Dambulla Aura; 89 (13.5 overs)	v	Colombo Stars; 90/1 (11.3 overs)
Pramod Madushan 23* (26); Kasun Rajitha 5/22 (4 overs)		Charith Asalanka 58* (36); Pramod Madushan 1/3 (2 overs)

Colombo Stars won by 9 wickets
Pallekele International Cricket Stadium, Kandy
Umpires: Lyndon Hannibal (SL) and Ranmore Martinesz (SL)
Player of the match: Kasun Rajitha (Colombo Stars)

- Colombo Stars won the toss and elected to field.

Match 15
17 December 2022
15:00 (N)
Scorecard

Dambulla Aura; 178/5 (20 overs)	v	Galle Gladiators; 130 (19.4 overs)
Shevon Daniel 80 (55); Nuwan Pradeep 3/37 (3 overs)		Lahiru Udara 32 (32); Pramod Madushan 3/17 (2.4 overs)

Dambulla Aura won by 48 runs
R. Premadasa Stadium, Colombo
Umpires: Kumar Dharmasena (SL) and Ruchira Palliyaguruge (SL)
Player of the match: Jordan Cox (Dambulla Aura)

- Dambulla Aura won the toss and elected to bat.

Match 18
18 December 2022
19:30 (D/N)
Scorecard

Kandy Falcons; 160/7 (20 overs)	v	Dambulla Aura; 121/9 (20 overs)
Ashen Bandara 37 (31); Matthew Forde 2/16 (3 overs)		Sikandar Raza 45 (33); Oshane Thomas 3/15 (4 overs)

Kandy Falcons won by 39 runs
R. Premadasa Stadium, Colombo
Umpires: Chamara de Soysa (SL) and Wayne Knights (NZ)
Player of the match: Oshane Thomas (Kandy Falcons)

- Kandy Falcons won the toss and elected to bat.

Match 20
19 December 2022
19:30 (D/N)
Scorecard

Galle Gladiators; 129/8 (20 overs)	v	Dambulla Aura; 134/6 (14.2 overs)
Nuwanidu Fernando 63* (42); Matthew Forde 4/11 (4 overs)		Matthew Forde 52 (30); Imad Wasim 2/32 (3.2 overs)

Dambulla Aura won by 4 wickets
R. Premadasa Stadium, Colombo
Umpires: Kumar Dharmasena (SL) and Raveendra Wimalasiri (SL)
Player of the match: Matthew Forde (Dambulla Aura)

- Galle Gladiators won the toss and elected to bat.
