= Sri Lankan cricket team in India in 2022–23 =

International cricket tour

	India	Sri Lanka
- Dates: 3 – 15 January 2023
Captains	Rohit Sharma (ODIs); Hardik Pandya (T20Is)	Dasun Shanaka

One Day International series
- Results: India won the 3-match series 3–0
Most runs	Virat Kohli (283)	Dasun Shanaka (121)
Most wickets	Mohammed Siraj (9)	Kasun Rajitha (6)
- Player of the series: Virat Kohli (Ind)

Twenty20 International series
- Results: India won the 3-match series 2–1
Most runs	Suryakumar Yadav (170)	Dasun Shanaka (124)
Most wickets	Umran Malik (7)	Dilshan Madushanka (5)
- Player of the series: Axar Patel (Ind)

The Sri Lankan cricket team toured India in January 2023 to play three One Day International (ODI) and three Twenty20 International (T20I) matches. In December 2022, the Board of Control for Cricket in India (BCCI) confirmed the fixtures.

== Squads ==
India		Sri Lanka	
T20Is	ODIs	T20Is	ODIs
Hardik Pandya (c); Suryakumar Yadav (vc); Yuzvendra Chahal; Ruturaj Gaikwad; Shubman Gill; Deepak Hooda; Ishan Kishan (wk); Mukesh Kumar; Umran Malik; Shivam Mavi; Axar Patel; Harshal Patel; Sanju Samson (wk); Jitesh Sharma (wk); Arshdeep Singh; Washington Sundar; Rahul Tripathi	Rohit Sharma (c); Hardik Pandya (vc); ~~Jasprit Bumrah~~; Yuzvendra Chahal; Shubman Gill; Shreyas Iyer; Ishan Kishan (wk); Virat Kohli; Umran Malik; Axar Patel; KL Rahul (wk); Mohammed Shami; Arshdeep Singh; Mohammed Siraj; Washington Sundar; Kuldeep Yadav; Suryakumar Yadav	Dasun Shanaka (c); Wanindu Hasaranga (vc); Charith Asalanka; Ashen Bandara; Dhananjaya de Silva; Avishka Fernando; Chamika Karunaratne; Lahiru Kumara; Pramod Madushan; Dilshan Madushanka; Kusal Mendis; Pathum Nissanka; Bhanuka Rajapaksa; Kasun Rajitha; Sadeera Samarawickrama; Maheesh Theekshana; Nuwan Thushara; Dunith Wellalage	Dasun Shanaka (c); Kusal Mendis (vc); Charith Asalanka; Ashen Bandara; Dhananjaya de Silva; Avishka Fernando; Nuwanidu Fernando; Wanindu Hasaranga; Chamika Karunaratne; Lahiru Kumara; Pramod Madushan; Dilshan Madushanka; Pathum Nissanka; Kasun Rajitha; Sadeera Samarawickrama; Maheesh Theekshana; Jeffrey Vandersay; Dunith Wellalage

On 3 January, Jasprit Bumrah was added to the India's ODI squad. However, on 9 January, Bumrah was pulled out of the squad. On 4 January, Jitesh Sharma replaced injured Sanju Samson in India's T20I squad.

== T20I series ==
=== 1st T20I ===
3 January 2023
19:00 (N)
Scorecard

India; 162/5 (20 overs)	v	Sri Lanka; 160 (20 overs)
Deepak Hooda 41* (23); Dhananjaya de Silva 1/6 (1 over)		Dasun Shanaka 45 (27); Shivam Mavi 4/22 (4 overs)

India won by 2 runs
Wankhede Stadium, Mumbai
Umpires: K. N. Ananthapadmanabhan (Ind) and Anil Chaudhary (Ind)
Player of the match: Deepak Hooda (Ind)

- Sri Lanka won the toss and elected to field.
- Shubman Gill and Shivam Mavi (Ind) both made their T20I debuts.

=== 2nd T20I ===
5 January 2023
19:00 (N)
Scorecard

Sri Lanka; 206/6 (20 overs)	v	India; 190/8 (20 overs)
Dasun Shanaka 56* (22); Umran Malik 3/48 (4 overs)		Axar Patel 65 (31); Dasun Shanaka 2/4 (1 over)

Sri Lanka won by 16 runs
Maharashtra Cricket Association Stadium, Pune
Umpires: Jayaraman Madanagopal (Ind) and Nitin Menon (Ind)
Player of the match: Dasun Shanaka (SL)

- India won the toss and elected to field.
- Rahul Tripathi (Ind) made his T20I debut.

=== 3rd T20I ===
7 January 2023
19:00 (N)
Scorecard

India; 228/5 (20 overs)	v	Sri Lanka; 137 (16.4 overs)
Suryakumar Yadav 112* (51); Dilshan Madushanka 2/55 (4 overs)		Kusal Mendis 23 (15); Arshdeep Singh 3/20 (2.4 overs)

India won by 91 runs
Saurashtra Cricket Association Stadium, Rajkot
Umpires: Jayaraman Madanagopal (Ind) and Nitin Menon (Ind)
Player of the match: Suryakumar Yadav (Ind)

- India won the toss and elected to bat.
- Suryakumar Yadav became the second Indian player to score three centuries in T20Is.

== ODI series ==
=== 1st ODI ===
10 January 2023
13:30 (D/N)
Scorecard

India; 373/7 (50 overs)	v	Sri Lanka; 306/8 (50 overs)
Virat Kohli 113 (87); Kasun Rajitha 3/88 (10 overs)		Dasun Shanaka 108* (88); Umran Malik 3/57 (8 overs)

India won by 67 runs
Assam Cricket Association Stadium, Guwahati
Umpires: Anil Chaudhary (Ind) and Nitin Menon (Ind)
Player of the match: Virat Kohli (Ind)

- Sri Lanka won the toss and elected to field.
- Dilshan Madushanka (SL) made his ODI debut.
- Virat Kohli equalled the record number of centuries in home ODIs (20).

=== 2nd ODI ===
12 January 2023
13:30 (D/N)
Scorecard

Sri Lanka; 215 (39.4 overs)	v	India; 219/6 (43.2 overs)
Nuwanidu Fernando 50 (63); Mohammed Siraj 3/30 (5.4 overs)		KL Rahul 64* (103); Chamika Karunaratne 2/51 (8 overs)

India won by 4 wickets
Eden Gardens, Kolkata
Umpires: K. N. Ananthapadmanabhan (Ind) and Nitin Menon (Ind)
Player of the match: Kuldeep Yadav (Ind)

- Sri Lanka won the toss and elected to bat.
- Nuwanidu Fernando (SL) made his ODI debut.

=== 3rd ODI ===
15 January 2023
13:30 (D/N)
Scorecard

India; 390/5 (50 overs)	v	Sri Lanka; 73 (22 overs)
Virat Kohli 166* (110); Kasun Rajitha 2/81 (10 overs)		Nuwanidu Fernando 19 (27); Mohammed Siraj 4/32 (10 overs)

India won by 317 runs
Greenfield International Stadium, Thiruvananthapuram
Umpires: Jayaraman Madanagopal (Ind) and Nitin Menon (Ind)
Player of the match: Virat Kohli (Ind)

- India won the toss and elected to bat.
- Dunith Wellalage replaced Jeffrey Vandersay as a concussion substitute.
- Virat Kohli (Ind) became the fifth highest run-scorer in ODIs. Kohli scored his 21st ODI century in India, the most by any player in a single country, and his 10th against Sri Lanka, the most by any player against any opposition.
- The victory margin of 317 runs was a record in ODIs.

== Statistics ==
=== Most runs (T20I) ===
Rank	Runs	Player	Teams	Innings	Average	High Score	Strike Rate	100	50
1	170	Suryakumar Yadav	(India)	3	65.00	112*	175.25	1	1
2	124	Dasun Shanaka	(Sri Lanka)	3	62.00	56*	187.87	0	1
3	117	Axar Patel	(India)	3	117.00	65	195.00	0	1
4	103	Kusal Mendis	(Sri Lanka)	3	34.33	52	145.07	0	1
5	68	Charith Asalanka	(Sri Lanka)	3	22.66	37	141.66	0	0
Last Updated: 1 March 2023

=== Most wickets (T20I) ===
Rank	Wickets	Player	Teams	Innings	Best	Average	Economy
1	7	Umran Malik	(India)	3	3/48	15.14	9.63
2	5	Dilshan Madushanka	(Sri Lanka)	3	2/45	27.00	11.25
3	4	Shivam Mavi	(India)	3	4/22	20.25	9.00
4	3	Arshdeep Singh	(India)	2	3/20	19.00	12.21
4	3	Axar Patel	(India)	3	2/24	24.66	7.40
4	3	Yuzvendra Chahal	(India)	3	2/30	28.66	9.55
4	3	Wanindu Hasaranga	(Sri Lanka)	3	1/22	33.00	9.00
4	3	Kasun Rajitha	(Sri Lanka)	3	2/22	34.66	8.66
4	3	Chamika Karunaratne	(Sri Lanka)	3	1/22	38.33	10.45
Last Updated: 1 March 2023

=== Most runs (ODI) ===
Rank	Runs	Player	Teams	Innings	Average	High Score	100	50
1	283	Virat Kohli	(India)	3	141.50	166*	2	0
2	207	Shubman Gill	(India)	3	69.00	116	1	1
3	142	Rohit Sharma	(India)	3	47.33	83	0	1
4	121	Dasun Shanaka	(Sri Lanka)	3	60.50	108*	1	0
5	110	KL Rahul	(India)	3	55.00	64*	0	1
Last Updated: 1 March 2023

=== Most wickets (ODI) ===
Rank	Wickets	Player	Teams	Innings	Best	Average	Economy
1	9	Mohammed Siraj	(India)	3	4/32	10.22	4.05
2	6	Kasun Rajitha	(Sri Lanka)	3	3/88	35.83	7.41
3	5	Kuldeep Yadav	(India)	2	3/51	13.40	4.46
3	5	Umran Malik	(India)	2	3/57	21.00	7.00
4	4	Lahiru Kumara	(Sri Lanka)	2	2/64	37.75	7.81
4	4	Chamika Karunaratne	(Sri Lanka)	3	2/51	40.75	6.79
5	3	Mohammed Shami	(India)	3	2/20	43.33	5.90
Last Updated: 1 March 2023

Sri Lankan cricket team in New Zealand in 2022
