= 2022 Asia Cup =

Cricket tournament in the United Arab Emirates

- Tournament logo
- Dates: 27 August – 11 September 2022
- Administrator: Asian Cricket Council
- Cricket format: Twenty20 International
- Tournament format(s): Round-robin and knockout
- Host: United Arab Emirates
- Champions: Sri Lanka (6th title)
- Runners-up: Pakistan
- Participants: 6
- Matches: 13
- Player of the series: (Sri Lanka) Wanindu Hasaranga
- Most runs: (Pakistan) Mohammad Rizwan (281)
- Most wickets: (India) Bhuvneshwar Kumar (11)

The 2022 Asia Cup (also known as DP World Asia Cup for sponsorship reasons) was the 15th edition of the Asia Cup cricket tournament, with the matches played as Twenty20 Internationals (T20Is) during August and September 2022 in the United Arab Emirates. Originally scheduled to be held in September 2020, the tournament was postponed in July 2020 due to the COVID-19 pandemic. It was then rescheduled to take place in June 2021, before being postponed once again. Pakistan was scheduled to host the tournament after retaining the rights to host the 2022 edition. However, in October 2021, the Asian Cricket Council (ACC) announced that Sri Lanka would host the tournament in 2022, with Pakistan co-hosting the 2023 edition with the former. India were the defending champions, and were eliminated in the Super Four stage in this edition. Sri Lanka beat Pakistan by 23 runs in the final, to win their sixth title and their first in T20I format.

On 21 July 2022, Sri Lanka Cricket (SLC) informed the ACC that they would not be in a position to host the tournament due to the economic and political crisis in the country. On 27 July 2022, the ACC confirmed that the tournament would be played in the United Arab Emirates, with Sri Lanka Cricket serving as the tournament's hosts. The fixtures for the tournament were announced on 2 August 2022.

== Background ==
In December 2018, the Pakistan Cricket Board (PCB) were granted the rights to host the tournament by the Asian Cricket Council (ACC). However, it was unclear if the matches will be played in Pakistan or the United Arab Emirates. After the announcement was made, the Board of Control for Cricket in India (BCCI) requested that the PCB change the event's venue due to ongoing security concerns. Pakistan last held a multi-team international tournament in 2008, with the 2008 Asia Cup. Since then, only a handful of international matches have taken place in Pakistan following the 2009 attack on the Sri Lanka national cricket team.

In May 2019, the ACC confirmed that Pakistan will host the tournament. The decision to host the tournament in Pakistan raised doubts over India's participation, with the ongoing political tension between the two countries. In October 2019, the decision to host the tournament in Pakistan was still to be agreed by the ACC, due to doubts raised over India's participation. In January 2020, various news outlets reported that Pakistan would not be hosting the tournament, due to their ongoing political tensions with India.

On 28 February 2020, the BCCI President Sourav Ganguly stated that "the Asia Cup will be held in Dubai and both India and Pakistan will play." The following day, Ehsan Mani Chairman of the PCB, contradicted Ganguly's statement, saying that the venue has not been finalised. Initially, The ACC was scheduled to meet on 3 March 2020 to discuss the location of the tournament, but the meeting was moved back until the end of March due to the COVID-19 pandemic. On 7 March, Mani said that the tournament would be played at a neutral venue. The following month, he admitted that the tournament may not take place at all due to the pandemic.

In June 2020, following a meeting with the ACC, the PCB said they would be willing to let Sri Lanka host the tournament, with India unwilling to travel to Pakistan. The ACC issued a press release following the meeting stating that "in light of the impact and consequences of the COVID-19 pandemic, possible venue options for the Asia Cup 2020 were discussed and it was decided to take the final decision in due course". In July 2020, an official announcement of the postponement was made by the ACC. In March 2021, the tournament was at risk of a further postponement after India qualified for the final of the World Test Championship, which clashed with the proposed dates in June.

The qualifier tournament had been postponed in July 2020. In May 2021, the ACC confirmed that there would be no Asia Cup in 2021, with that edition of the tournament deferred until 2023. In October 2021, following a meeting with the ACC, Ramiz Raja confirmed that Pakistan would host the following tournament in 2023, with Sri Lanka hosting the 2022 edition. A qualification tournament was played in August 2022.

On 17 July 2022, due to the economic crisis in Sri Lanka and mass protests across the country, the Secretary of SLC Mohan de Silva stated that the tournament will be hosted in the United Arab Emirates.

== Teams and qualifications ==
Means of qualification	Date	Host	Berths	Qualified
ICC Full Member	—N/a	—N/a	5	Afghanistan; Bangladesh; India; Pakistan; Sri Lanka
Qualifier	August 2022	Oman	1	Hong Kong
Total			6	

The qualifier tournament was contested in August 2022, by the UAE and Kuwait, who progressed from the 2020 ACC Western Region T20, as well as Singapore and Hong Kong, who came through the 2020 ACC Eastern Region T20. Hong Kong qualified for the main event after a first-place finish in the qualifier.

== Squads ==
Afghanistan	Bangladesh	Hong Kong	India	Pakistan	Sri Lanka
Mohammad Nabi (c); Najibullah Zadran (vc); Fareed Ahmad; Usman Ghani; Noor Ahmad; Rahmanullah Gurbaz (wk); Karim Janat; Rashid Khan; Azmatullah Omarzai; Fazalhaq Farooqi; Hashmatullah Shahidi; Samiullah Shinwari; Naveen-ul-Haq; Mujeeb Ur Rahman; Ibrahim Zadran; Afsar Zazai (wk); Hazratullah Zazai	Shakib Al Hasan (c); Afif Hossain (vc); Nasum Ahmed; Taskin Ahmed; Parvez Hossain Emon; Anamul Haque Bijoy (wk); Mahedi Hasan; Mehidy Hasan Miraz; ~~Nurul Hasan Sohan (wk)~~; Ebadot Hossain; Soumya Sarkar; ~~Hasan Mahmud~~; Mahmudullah; Mohammad Naim; Mushfiqur Rahim (wk); Mustafizur Rahman; Sabbir Rahman; Mohammad Saifuddin	Nizakat Khan (c); Kinchit Shah (vc); Zeeshan Ali; Haroon Arshad; Mohammad Ghazanfar; Babar Hayat; Aftab Hussain; Ateeq Iqbal; Aizaz Khan; Ehsan Khan; Scott McKechnie (wk); Yasim Murtaza; Dhananjay Rao; Wajid Shah; Ayush Shukla; Ahan Trivedi; Mohammad Waheed	Rohit Sharma (c); KL Rahul (vc, wk); Ravichandran Ashwin; Ravi Bishnoi; Yuzvendra Chahal; Deepak Chahar; Deepak Hooda; ~~Ravindra Jadeja~~; Dinesh Karthik (wk); Avesh Khan; Virat Kohli; Bhuvneshwar Kumar; Hardik Pandya; Rishabh Pant (wk); Axar Patel; Arshdeep Singh; Suryakumar Yadav	Babar Azam (c); Shadab Khan (vc); ~~Shaheen Afridi~~; Iftikhar Ahmed; Asif Ali; Haider Ali; Hasan Ali; Shahnawaz Dahani; Mohammad Hasnain; Mohammad Nawaz; Usman Qadir; Haris Rauf; Mohammad Rizwan (wk); Khushdil Shah; Naseem Shah; ~~Mohammad Wasim~~; Fakhar Zaman	Dasun Shanaka (c); Charith Asalanka (vc); Ashen Bandara; ~~Dushmantha Chameera~~; Dinesh Chandimal (wk); Dhananjaya de Silva; Asitha Fernando; ~~Binura Fernando~~; Nuwanidu Fernando; Danushka Gunathilaka; Wanindu Hasaranga; Praveen Jayawickrama; Chamika Karunaratne; Pramod Madushan; Dilshan Madushanka; Kusal Mendis (wk); Pathum Nissanka; Matheesha Pathirana; Bhanuka Rajapaksa (wk); ~~Kasun Rajitha~~; Maheesh Theekshana; Nuwan Thushara; Jeffrey Vandersay

India also named Deepak Chahar, Shreyas Iyer and Axar Patel as standby players. The ACC extended the deadline for squad announcements from 8 August to 11 August 2022 following a request from the Bangladesh Cricket Board. Bangladesh also named Mrittunjoy Chowdhury, Ripon Mondol and Soumya Sarkar as standby players. Afghanistan also named Qais Ahmad, Sharafuddin Ashraf and Nijat Masood as reserve players. Binura Fernando and Kasun Rajitha were ruled out due to injury shortly after being named into the squad and were replaced by Asitha Fernando and Pramod Madushan respectively. On 20 August 2022, Pakistan bowler Shaheen Afridi was ruled out of the tournament due to a knee injury, and was replaced by Mohammad Hasnain. On 22 August 2022, Nurul Hasan and Hasan Mahmud were ruled out due to injuries and Mohammad Naim was added to the Bangladesh squad. On 26 August 2022, Mohammad Wasim was ruled out due to side strain and Hasan Ali was named as his replacement. On 2 September 2022, Ravindra Jadeja was ruled out of the tournament due to a right knee injury, with Axar Patel added to the Indian squad as his replacement.

== Venues ==
United Arab Emirates
Dubai	Sharjah
Dubai International Cricket Stadium	Sharjah Cricket Stadium
Coordinates: 25°2′48″N 55°13′8″E	Coordinates: 25°19′50.96″N 55°25′15.44″E
Capacity: 25,000	Capacity: 16,000
Matches: 9	Matches: 4
2022 Asia Cup is located in United Arab Emirates

== Group stage ==
=== Group A ===
Pos	Team	Pld	W	L	NR	Pts	NRR
1	India	2	2	0	0	4	1.096
2	Pakistan	2	1	1	0	2	3.811
3	Hong Kong	2	0	2	0	0	−4.875

Source: ESPNcricinfo

Advanced to the Super Four

28 August 2022
18:00 (D/N)
Scorecard

Pakistan; 147 (19.5 overs)	v	India; 148/5 (19.4 overs)
Mohammad Rizwan 43 (42); Bhuvneshwar Kumar 4/26 (4 overs)		Ravindra Jadeja 35 (29); Mohammad Nawaz 3/33 (3.4 overs)

India won by 5 wickets
Dubai International Cricket Stadium, Dubai
Umpires: Ruchira Palliyaguruge (SL) and Masudur Rahman (Ban)
Player of the match: Hardik Pandya (Ind)

- India won the toss and elected to field.
- Naseem Shah (Pak) made his T20I debut.
- Virat Kohli (Ind) played in his 100th T20I, becoming the first Indian and second cricketer overall to play in 100 matches in all three formats of international cricket.

31 August 2022
18:00 (D/N)
Scorecard

India; 192/2 (20 overs)	v	Hong Kong; 152/5 (20 overs)
Suryakumar Yadav 68* (26); Mohammad Ghazanfar 1/19 (2 overs)		Babar Hayat 41 (35); Bhuvneshwar Kumar 1/15 (3 overs)

India won by 40 runs
Dubai International Cricket Stadium, Dubai
Umpires: Ahsan Raza (Pak) and Gazi Sohel (Ban)
Player of the match: Suryakumar Yadav (Ind)

- Hong Kong won the toss and elected to field.
- This was the first time India and Hong Kong faced each other in T20Is.
- India qualified for Super four as the result of match.

2 September 2022
18:00 (D/N)
Scorecard

Pakistan; 193/2 (20 overs)	v	Hong Kong; 38 (10.4 overs)
Mohammad Rizwan 78* (57); Ehsan Khan 2/28 (4 overs)		Nizakat Khan 8 (13); Shadab Khan 4/8 (2.4 overs)

Pakistan won by 155 runs
Sharjah Cricket Stadium, Sharjah
Umpires: Ruchira Palliyaguruge (SL) and Raveendra Wimalasiri (SL)
Player of the match: Mohammad Rizwan (Pak)

- Hong Kong won the toss and elected to field.
- In terms of runs, this was Pakistan's largest winning margin in T20Is.
- This was Hong Kong's lowest score in T20Is.
- Pakistan qualified for super four and Hong Kong eliminated as the result of match.

=== Group B ===
Pos	Team	Pld	W	L	NR	Pts	NRR
1	Afghanistan	2	2	0	0	4	2.467
2	Sri Lanka	2	1	1	0	2	−2.233
3	Bangladesh	2	0	2	0	0	−0.576

Source: ESPNcricinfo

Advanced to the Super Four

27 August 2022
18:00 (D/N)
Scorecard

Sri Lanka; 105 (19.4 overs)	v	Afghanistan; 106/2 (10.1 overs)
Bhanuka Rajapaksa 38 (29); Fazalhaq Farooqi 3/11 (3.4 overs)		Rahmanullah Gurbaz 40 (18); Wanindu Hasaranga 1/19 (3 overs)

Afghanistan won by 8 wickets
Dubai International Cricket Stadium, Dubai
Umpires: Anil Chaudhary (Ind) and Ahsan Raza (Pak)
Player of the match: Fazalhaq Farooqi (Afg)

- Afghanistan won the toss and elected to field.
- Dilshan Madushanka and Matheesha Pathirana (SL) both made their T20I debuts.

30 August 2022
18:00 (D/N)
Scorecard

Bangladesh; 127/7 (20 overs)	v	Afghanistan; 131/3 (18.3 overs)
Mosaddek Hossain 48* (31); Mujeeb Ur Rahman 3/16 (4 overs)		Najibullah Zadran 43* (17); Mosaddek Hossain 1/12 (2.3 overs)

Afghanistan won by 7 wickets
Sharjah Cricket Stadium, Sharjah
Umpires: Jayaraman Madanagopal (Ind) and Asif Yaqoob (Pak)
Player of the match: Mujeeb Ur Rahman (Afg)

- Bangladesh won the toss and elected to bat.
- Shakib Al Hasan (Ban) played in his 100th T20I.
- Afghanistan qualified for super four as the result of the match.

1 September 2022
18:00 (D/N)
Scorecard

Bangladesh; 183/7 (20 overs)	v	Sri Lanka; 184/8 (19.2 overs)
Afif Hossain 39 (22); Chamika Karunaratne 2/32 (4 overs)		Kusal Mendis 60 (37); Ebadot Hossain 3/51 (4 overs)

Sri Lanka won by 2 wickets
Dubai International Cricket Stadium, Dubai
Umpires: Anil Chaudhary (Ind) and Ahmed Shah Pakteen (Afg)
Player of the match: Kusal Mendis (SL)

- Sri Lanka won the toss and elected to field.
- Ebadot Hossain (Ban) and Asitha Fernando (SL) both made their T20I debuts.
- Sri Lanka qualified for super four and Bangladesh eliminated as the result of the match.

== Super Four ==
Pos	Team	Pld	W	L	NR	Pts	NRR
1	Sri Lanka	3	3	0	0	6	0.701
2	Pakistan	3	2	1	0	4	−0.279
3	India	3	1	2	0	2	1.607
4	Afghanistan	3	0	3	0	0	−2.006

Source: ESPNcricinfo

Advanced to the final

3 September 2022
18:00 (D/N)
Scorecard

Afghanistan; 175/6 (20 overs)	v	Sri Lanka; 179/6 (19.1 overs)
Rahmanullah Gurbaz 84 (45); Dilshan Madushanka 2/37 (4 overs)		Kusal Mendis 36 (19); Mujeeb Ur Rahman 2/30 (4 overs)

Sri Lanka won by 4 wickets
Sharjah Cricket Stadium, Sharjah
Umpires: Ahsan Raza (Pak) and Gazi Sohel (Ban)
Player of the match: Rahmanullah Gurbaz (Afg)

- Sri Lanka won the toss and elected to field.

4 September 2022
18:00 (D/N)
Scorecard

India; 181/7 (20 overs)	v	Pakistan; 182/5 (19.5 overs)
Virat Kohli 60 (44); Shadab Khan 2/31 (4 overs)		Mohammad Rizwan 71 (51); Ravi Bishnoi 1/26 (4 overs)

Pakistan won by 5 wickets
Dubai International Cricket Stadium, Dubai
Umpires: Masudur Rahman (Ban) and Raveendra Wimalasiri (SL)
Player of the match: Mohammad Nawaz (Pak)

- Pakistan won the toss and elected to field.

6 September 2022
18:00 (D/N)
Scorecard

India; 173/8 (20 overs)	v	Sri Lanka; 174/4 (19.5 overs)
Rohit Sharma 72 (41); Dilshan Madushanka 3/24 (4 overs)		Kusal Mendis 57 (37); Yuzvendra Chahal 3/34 (4 overs)

Sri Lanka won by 6 wickets
Dubai International Cricket Stadium, Dubai
Umpires: Ahsan Raza (Pak) and Bismillah Jan Shinwari (Afg)
Player of the match: Dasun Shanaka (SL)

- Sri Lanka won the toss and elected to field.
- Sri Lanka qualified for the final as the result of the match and India were eliminated.

7 September 2022
18:00 (D/N)
Scorecard

Afghanistan; 129/6 (20 overs)	v	Pakistan; 131/9 (19.2 overs)
Ibrahim Zadran 35 (37); Haris Rauf 2/26 (4 overs)		Shadab Khan 36 (26); Fazalhaq Farooqi 3/31 (3.2 overs)

Pakistan won by 1 wicket
Sharjah Cricket Stadium, Sharjah
Umpires: Anil Chaudhary (Ind) and Jayaraman Madanagopal (Ind)
Player of the match: Shadab Khan (Pak)

- Pakistan won the toss and elected to field.
- Mohammad Nabi (Afg) played in his 100th T20I.
- Pakistan qualified for the final and Afghanistan were eliminated as a result of this match.

8 September 2022
18:00 (D/N)
Scorecard

India; 212/2 (20 overs)	v	Afghanistan; 111/8 (20 overs)
Virat Kohli 122* (61); Fareed Ahmad 2/57 (4 overs)		Ibrahim Zadran 64* (59); Bhuvneshwar Kumar 5/4 (4 overs)

India won by 101 runs
Dubai International Cricket Stadium, Dubai
Umpires: Ruchira Palliyaguruge (SL) and Asif Yaqoob (Pak)
Player of the match: Virat Kohli (Ind)

- Afghanistan won the toss and elected to field.
- Virat Kohli (Ind) scored his first century in T20Is and made a new record for the highest T20I score for India (later surpassed) . He also scored his 71st century in international cricket, and equalled Ricky Ponting's record of the second-most centuries scored across formats in international cricket. Kohli also became the fourth Indian after Suresh Raina, Rohit Sharma and KL Rahul to score 100s in all three formats.
- Bhuvneshwar Kumar took his second five-for in T20Is, becoming the first Indian to do so.

9 September 2022
18:00 (D/N)
Scorecard

Pakistan; 121 (19.1 overs)	v	Sri Lanka; 124/5 (17 overs)
Babar Azam 30 (29); Wanindu Hasaranga 3/21 (4 overs)		Pathum Nissanka 55* (48); Haris Rauf 2/19 (3 overs)

Sri Lanka won by 5 wickets
Dubai International Cricket Stadium, Dubai
Umpires: Anil Chaudhary (Ind) and Ahmed Shah Pakteen (Afg)
Player of the match: Wanindu Hasaranga (SL)

- Sri Lanka won the toss and elected to field.
- Pramod Madushan (SL) made his T20I debut.

== Final ==
11 September 2022
18:00 (D/N)
Scorecard

Sri Lanka; 170/6 (20 overs)	v	Pakistan; 147 (20 overs)
Bhanuka Rajapaksa 71* (45); Haris Rauf 3/29 (4 overs)		Mohammad Rizwan 55 (49); Pramod Madushan 4/34 (4 overs)

Sri Lanka won by 23 runs
Dubai International Cricket Stadium, Dubai
Umpires: Anil Chaudhary (Ind) and Masudur Rahman (Ban)
Player of the match: Bhanuka Rajapaksa (SL)

- Pakistan won the toss and elected to field.

== Statistics ==
=== Most runs ===
The top five highest run scorers (total runs) in the tournament are included in this table.

Player	Innings	NO	Runs	Average	SR	HS	100	50	4s	6s
(Pakistan) Mohammad Rizwan	6	1	281	56.20	117.57	78*	0	3	21	6
(India) Virat Kohli	5	2	276	92.00	147.59	122*	1	2	20	11
(Afghanistan) Ibrahim Zadran	5	2	196	65.33	104.25	64*	0	1	14	4
(Sri Lanka) Bhanuka Rajapaksa	6	2	191	47.75	149.21	71*	0	1	15	9
(Sri Lanka) Pathum Nissanka	5	1	173	34.60	115.33	55*	0	2	15	5

=== Most wickets ===
The top five wicket-takers in the tournament are included in this table.

Player	Innings	Wickets	Runs	Overs	BBI	Econ.	Ave.	5WI
(India) Bhuvneshwar Kumar	5	11	115	19.0	5/4	6.05	10.45	1
(Sri Lanka) Wanindu Hasaranga	6	9	170	23.0	3/21	7.39	18.88	0
(Pakistan) Mohammad Nawaz	6	8	110	18.4	3/5	5.89	13.75	0
(Pakistan) Shadab Khan	5	8	113	18.4	4/8	6.05	14.12	0
(Pakistan) Haris Rauf	6	8	153	20.0	3/29	7.65	19.12	0
