= Masudur Rahman (umpire) =

Bangladeshi cricketer (born 1975)

Personal information
- Full name: Masudur Rahman
- Born: 13 April 1975 (age 51); Faridpur, Dhaka, Bangladesh
- Nickname: Mukul
- Batting: Right-handed
- Bowling: Right-arm off break
- Role: Umpire

Domestic team information
- Years: Team
- 2000/01: Dhaka Metropolis
- 2001/02: Barisal Division
- 2003/04–2004/05: Dhaka Division
- FC debut: 22 November 2000 Dhaka Metropolis v Sylhet Division
- Last FC: 13 April 2005 Dhaka Division v Chittagong Division
- LA debut: 25 November 2000 Dhaka Metropolis v Sylhet Division
- Last LA: 20 April 2005 Dhaka Division v Khulna Division

Umpiring information
- ODIs umpired: 28 (2018–2026)
- T20Is umpired: 51 (2018–2025)
- WODIs umpired: 11 (2012–2025)
- WT20Is umpired: 10 (2012–2018)

Career statistics
Competition	FC	LA
Matches	12	30
Runs scored	301	225
Batting average	18.81	16.07
100s/50s	0/1	0/0
Top score	59	45*
Balls bowled	1710	1,353
Wickets	15	36
Bowling average	52.13	23.55
5 wickets in innings	0	0
10 wickets in match	0	0
Best bowling	4/102	3/17
Catches/stumpings	4/–	10/–
- Source: ESPNcricinfo, 27 November 2023

Masudur Rahman Mukul (Bengali: মাসুদুর রহমান মুকুল; born 13 April 1975) is a Bangladeshi international cricket umpire and former first-class cricketer. He was a right-handed batsman and an off-break bowler.

== Umpiring career ==
He made his List A and First-class umpiring debut in November 2007 and December 2008, respectively. He stood in the one-day tour match between Bangladesh Cricket Board Select XI and England XI during England's tour of Bangladesh in October 2016.

On 21 January 2018, he stood in his first men's One Day International (ODI), a fixture between Sri Lanka and Zimbabwe in the 2017–18 Bangladesh Tri-Nation Series. On 18 February 2018, he stood in his first men's Twenty20 International (T20I) match, between Bangladesh and Sri Lanka.

He was one of the sixteen umpires for the 2020 Under-19 Cricket World Cup tournament in South Africa. He was one of the two on-field umpires for the 2022 Asia Cup final in Dubai on 11 September 2022.

In July 2023, he was named as one of the match officials for the 2023 Global T20 Canada, becoming the first Bangladeshi umpire to officiate in a foreign T20 franchise league. He was named as one of the match officials for the 2023 Asia Cup.

He was one of the match officials for both Men's and Women's tournament at the 2022 Asian Games including the final match of both the tournaments.

In January 2024, he was named as one of the sixteen match officials for 2024 Under-19 Cricket World Cup.

== See also ==
- List of One Day International cricket umpires
- List of Twenty20 International cricket umpires
