= Dilshan Madushanka =

Sri Lankan cricketer

Personal information
- Full name: Lokumarakkalage Dilshan Madushanka
- Born: 18 September 2000 (age 26); Hambantota, Sri Lanka
- Batting: Right-handed
- Bowling: Left-arm fast-medium
- Role: Bowler

International information
- National side: Sri Lanka (2022-present)
- Only Test (cap 164): 24 July 2023 v Pakistan
- ODI debut (cap 206): 10 January 2023 v India
- Last ODI: 31 October 2026 v Pakistan
- T20I debut (cap 95): 27 August 2022 v Afghanistan
- Last T20I: 19 September 2026 v England

Domestic team information
- Years: Team
- Dambulla Viking
- Galle Gladiators
- Colts Cricket Club
- 2023: Durban's Super Giants
- 2023: Jaffna Kings
- 2024–present: Sharjah Warriorz
- 2024: Dambulla Sixers

Career statistics
Competition	Test	ODI	T20I	FC
Matches	1	36	22	17
Runs scored	0	39	2	168
Batting average	0.00	9.75	0.33	21.00
100s/50s	0/0	0/0	0/0	0/0
Top score	0*	19	1*	38*
Balls bowled	102	1,662	422	1,989
Wickets	0	65	20	47
Bowling average	–	26.40	33.75	26.53
5 wickets in innings	–	2	0	1
10 wickets in match	–	0	0	0
Best bowling	–	5/34	3/24	6/33
Catches/stumpings	1/–	7/–	5/–	5/–
- Source: ESPNcricinfo, 3 November 2026

Lokumarakkalage Dilshan Madushanka (born 18 September 2000) is a professional Sri Lankan cricketer who currently plays limited over internationals for Sri Lanka. He is a past pupil of Hungama Vijayaba Central College, Hungama.

== Domestic career ==
He made his first-class debut on 13 March 2020, for Colts Cricket Club in the 2019–20 Premier League Tournament. In October 2020, he was drafted by the Dambulla Viiking for the inaugural edition of the Lanka Premier League. He made his Twenty20 debut on 9 December 2020, for the Dambulla Viiking in the 2020 Lanka Premier League.

In August 2021, he was named in the SLC Blues team for the 2021 SLC Invitational T20 League tournament. In November 2021, he was selected to play for the Galle Gladiators following the players' draft for the 2021 Lanka Premier League. In July 2022, he was signed by the Jaffna Kings for the third edition of the Lanka Premier League.

== International career ==
In January 2020, he was named in Sri Lanka's squad for the 2020 Under-19 Cricket World Cup. On 27 January 2020, in Sri Lanka's plate quarter-final match against Nigeria, Madushanka took a five-wicket haul.

In December 2020, Madushanka was named in Sri Lanka's Test squad for their series against South Africa. In February 2021, Madushanka was named in Sri Lanka's limited overs squad for their series against the West Indies. In April 2021, Madushanka was again named in Sri Lanka's Test squad, this time for their series against Bangladesh.

In April 2022, he was named in Sri Lanka's Test squad for their series against Bangladesh. He made his List A debut on 8 June 2022, for Sri Lanka A against Australia A during Australia's tour of Sri Lanka. Later the same month, he was named in Sri Lanka's Test squad, also for their home series against Australia.

Also in July, he was again named in Sri Lanka's Test squad, this time for their home series against Pakistan. In August 2022, he was named in Sri Lanka's Twenty20 International (T20I) squad for the 2022 Asia Cup. He made his T20I debut on 27 August 2022, against Afghanistan.

Madushanka made his One Day International (ODI) debut on 10 January 2023, against India. Madushanka took his maiden ODI wicket of Rohit Sharma. He made his Test debut on 24 July 2023, against Pakistan. At the World Cup 2023, Madushanka took a total of 21 wickets over 9 matches at an average of 25.00, and had his first ODI five-wicket haul of 5/80 against India on 2nd Nov 2023 held at Wankhede Stadium, Mumbai.

In May 2024, he was named in Sri Lanka’s squad for the 2024 ICC Men's T20 World Cup tournament.
