= Nuwanidu Fernando =

Sri Lankan cricketer

Personal information
- Full name: Muthuthanthirige Nuwanidu Keshawa Fernando
- Born: 13 October 1999 (age 27); Colombo, Sri Lanka
- Batting: Right-handed
- Bowling: Right-arm off break
- Role: Batter
- Relatives: Vishwa Fernando (brother)

International information
- National side: Sri Lanka (2023-present)
- ODI debut (cap 207): 12 January 2023 v India
- Last ODI: 19 November 2024 v New Zealand
- Only T20I (cap 102): 4 October 2023 v Afghanistan

Career statistics
| Competition | ODI | T20I | FC | LA |
|---|---|---|---|---|
| Matches | 5 | 1 | 62 | 65 |
| Runs scored | 75 | 5 | 3258 | 1889 |
| Batting average | 18.75 | 5.00 | 37.88 | 33.14 |
| 100s/50s | 0/1 | 0/0 | 12/11 | 3/13 |
| Top score | 50 | 5 | 180 | 164 |
| Balls bowled | 12 | 0 | 2076 | 780 |
| Wickets | 0 | 0 | 24 | 21 |
| Bowling average | – | – | 54.04 | 27.33 |
| 5 wickets in innings | 0 | 0 | 0 | 1 |
| 10 wickets in match | 0 | 0 | 0 | 0 |
| Best bowling | – | – | 4/58 | 5/28 |
| Catches/stumpings | 0/– | 1/– | 67/– | 36/– |
Medal record
Men's cricket
Representing Sri Lanka
Asian Games
| Bronze medal – third place | 2026 Aichi–Nagoya | Team |
- Source: Cricinfo, 4 April 2025

Muthuthanthirige Nuwanidu Keshawa Fernando (born 13 October 1999), generally known as Nuwanidu Fernando is a professional Sri Lankan cricketer who plays as a top-order batter in all forms of the game. He had his education in St. Sebastian's College, Moratuwa. He is the younger brother of Sri Lankan cricketer Vishwa Fernando.

== Domestic career ==
He made his first-class debut for Panadura Sports Club in the 2016–17 Premier League Tournament on 28 December 2016. In December 2017, he was named in Sri Lanka's squad for the 2018 Under-19 Cricket World Cup. In August 2018, he was named in Dambulla's squad the 2018 SLC T20 League.

In October 2018, he was the leading run-scorer for Sri Lanka in the 2018 ACC Under-19 Asia Cup, with 195 runs in five matches. He made his Twenty20 debut for Badureliya Sports Club in the 2018–19 SLC Twenty20 Tournament on 18 February 2019. He made his List A debut on 14 December 2019, for Sinhalese Sports Club in the 2019–20 Invitation Limited Over Tournament. In October 2020, he was drafted by the Jaffna Stallions for the inaugural edition of the Lanka Premier League. In March 2021, he was part of the Sinhalese Sports Club team that won the 2020–21 SLC Twenty20 Tournament, the first time they had won the tournament since 2005. In August 2021, he was named in the SLC Greys team for the 2021 SLC Invitational T20 League tournament. In November 2021, he was selected to play for the Colombo Stars following the players' draft for the 2021 Lanka Premier League.

In April 2022, Sri Lanka Cricket (SLC) named him in the Sri Lanka Emerging Team's squad for their tour to England. On 29 May Nuwanidu scored his maiden T20 century against Gloucestershire. He scored unbeaten 126 runs hitting 14 boundaries and four sixes. His knock helped to put 205 runs on the board and Sri Lanka Cricket Development XI team won the match by 67 runs.

In June 2022, he was named in the Sri Lanka A squad for their matches against Australia A during Australia's tour of Sri Lanka.

In July 2022, he was signed by the Galle Gladiators for the third edition of the Lanka Premier League. On 12 December 2022, against Kandy Falcons, Fernando scored his third T20 half-century, which was also his first in the Lanka Premier League. He put 113 run partnership with Thanuka Dabare for the fifth wicket. He scored another half-century on 19 December 2022, against Dambulla Aura. He scored unbeaten 63 runs hitting three boundaries and five sixes.

== International career ==
In May 2022, he was named in Sri Lanka's Twenty20 International (T20I) squad for their series against Australia.

Fernando made his One Day International debut on 12 January 2023, against India. He scored Half century in debut innings in Kolkata.

In March 2023, he was named in both One Day International and Twenty20 International squad for the series against New Zealand.
