= Chamika Karunaratne =

Sri Lankan cricketer (born 1996)

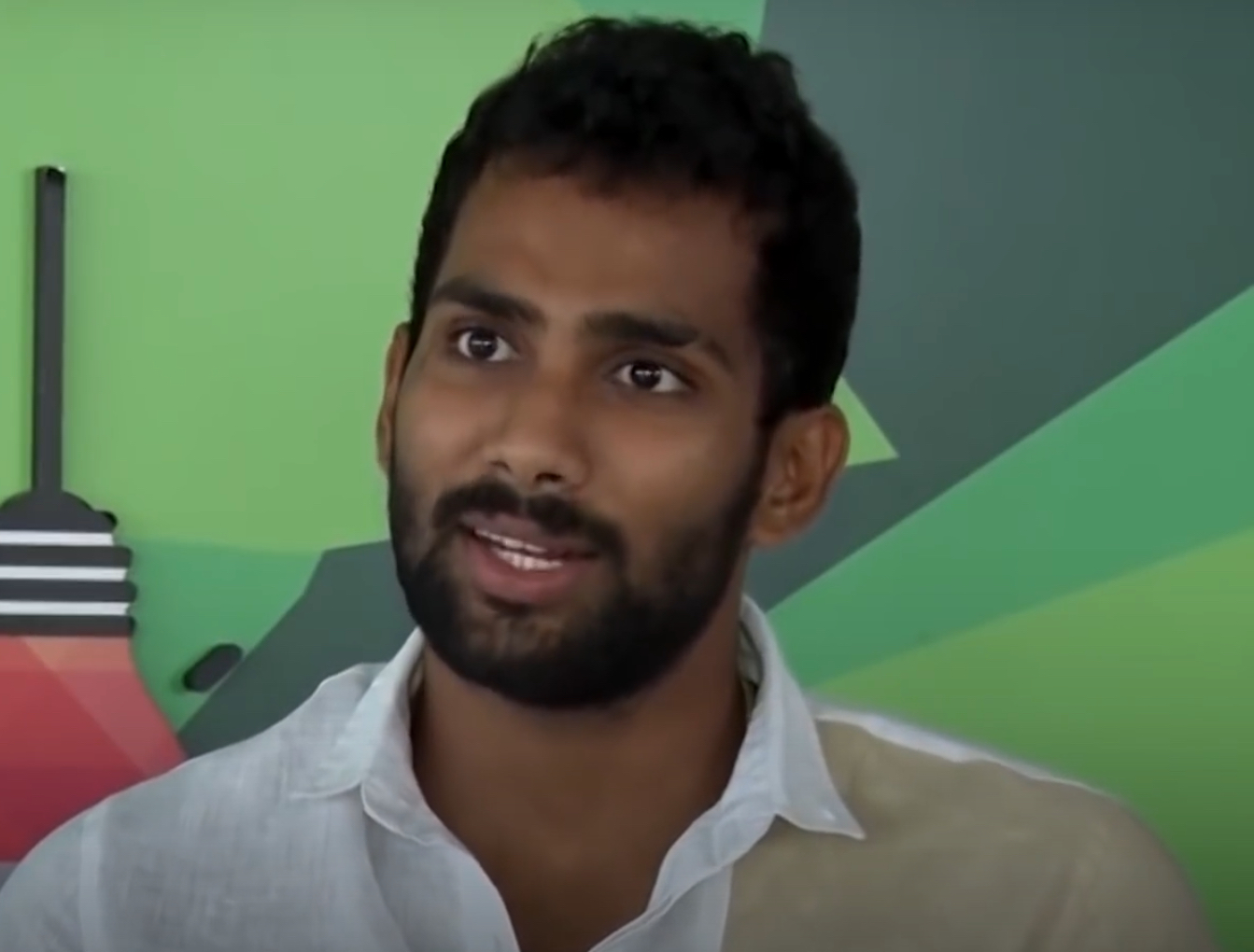
- Karunaratne in 2021

Personal information
- Full name: Edirimuni Chamika Dinushan Perera Karunaratne
- Born: 29 May 1996 (age 30); Colombo, Sri Lanka
- Nickname: Chami, Handiya
- Batting: Right-handed
- Bowling: Right-arm Fast-medium
- Role: Bowling All-rounder
- Relatives: Louis Karunaratne (father); Niluka Karunaratne (brother); Dinuka Karunaratne (brother); Diluka Karunaratne (brother)

International information
- National side: Sri Lanka (2019–present)
- Only Test (cap 148): 1 February 2019 v Australia
- ODI debut (cap 196): 28 May 2021 v Bangladesh
- Last ODI: 9 November 2023 v New Zealand
- T20I debut (cap 88): 25 July 2021 v India
- Last T20I: 23 September 2025 v Pakistan

Domestic team information
- Years: Team
- 2014–2017: Tamil Union Cricket and Athletic Club
- 2017–present: Nondescripts Cricket Club
- 2021: Dambulla Giants
- 2022: Kandy Falcons
- 2023: Colombo Strikers
- 2026: Galle Gallants
- 2026: Pokhara Avengers

Career statistics
Competition	Test	ODI	T20I	FC
Matches	1	26	45	55
Runs scored	22	451	308	1832
Batting average	22.00	25.05	16.21	23.79
100s/50s	–/–	–/1	–/–	1/12
Top score	22	75	31	100*
Balls bowled	156	797	707	5129
Wickets	1	24	24	104
Bowling average	148.00	31.87	41.25	33.38
5 wickets in innings	–	–	–	1
10 wickets in match	–	–	–	–
Best bowling	1/130	4/43	2/22	5/63
Catches/stumpings	1/–	6/–	13/–	27/–
Medal record
Men's cricket
Representing Sri Lanka
Asian Games
Bronze medal – third place	2026 Aichi–Nagoya	Team
- Source: ESPNcricinfo, 28 September 2025

Edirimuni Chamika Dinushan Perera Karunaratne (born 29 May 1996), popularly known as Chamika Karunaratne, is a professional Sri Lankan cricketer who plays all three formats as well as a national badminton player. He made his international debut for the Sri Lanka cricket team in February 2019.

In November 2022, he was handed a suspended one-year ban from all forms of cricket after violating and breaching several clauses of his player agreement during the aftermath of the 2022 ICC Men's T20 World Cup.

== Biography ==
He pursued his primary and secondary education at Royal College, Colombo. He went on to captain the athletics, badminton and cricket teams at Royal College. He was adjudged with the coveted Royal Crown on two occasions for his outstanding achievements across multiple sports while representing Royal College. He began his school cricket career at Royal College in the under 13C team in 2008. He broke into the under 13A team at his school in the same year after emerging as the top runscorer among C division cricket teams.

== Domestic and T20 franchise career ==
He made his first-class debut for Tamil Union Cricket and Athletic Club in the 2015–16 Premier League Tournament on 18 December 2015.

In March 2018, he was named in Kandy's squad for the 2017–18 Super Four Provincial Tournament. In August 2018, he was named in Kandy's squad the 2018 SLC T20 League. In the same month, Sri Lanka Cricket named him in a preliminary squad of 31 players for the 2018 Asia Cup.

In March 2019, he was named in Colombo's squad for the 2019 Super Provincial One Day Tournament. In August 2021, he was named in the SLC Reds team for the 2021 SLC Invitational T20 League tournament. In November 2021, he was selected to play for the Dambulla Giants following the players' draft for the 2021 Lanka Premier League.

In February 2022, he was bought by the Kolkata Knight Riders in the auction for the 2022 Indian Premier League tournament. In July 2022, he was signed by the Kandy Falcons for the third edition of the Lanka Premier League. In January 2023, he was signed with Dubai Capitals in ILT20.

== International career ==
In December 2018, he was named in Sri Lanka team for the 2018 ACC Emerging Teams Asia Cup. In January 2019, he was added to Sri Lanka's Test squad for the second Test against Australia. He made his Test debut for Sri Lanka against Australia on 1 February 2019.

In May 2021, he was named in Sri Lanka's One Day International (ODI) squad for their series against Bangladesh. He made his ODI debut for Sri Lanka on 28 May 2021 against Bangladesh. In July 2021, he was named in Sri Lanka's squad for their series against India. He made his Twenty20 International (T20I) debut on 25 July 2021, for Sri Lanka against India.

In September 2021, Karunaratne was named in Sri Lanka's squad for the 2021 ICC Men's T20 World Cup. In July 2022, Sri Lanka vs Australia 2nd ODI his all round performances due he won the man of the match award. 5th ODI he scored his maiden Half century in ODI Cricket. Karunaratne was named in Sri Lanka's squad for the 2022 Asia Cup. In September, Karunaratne was named in Sri Lanka's squad for the 2022 ICC Men's T20 World Cup. In March 2023, against New Zealand in the first ODI, he took 4 wickets at Eden Park Auckland in a losing cause.

== Outside cricket ==
Chamika Karunaratne was a junior national champion in javelin throw and also competed in the international badminton. His father Louie Karunaratne and brothers Dinuka, Niluka and Diluka are also professional badminton players. In February 2021, he along with his elder brother and Sri Lanka's number one badminton player Niluka Karunaratne played in the first round encounters in the men's singles of the Sri Lankan Badminton Nationals.

In October 2022, nutritional brand Prima Stella Dairy announced that Chamika would act as its brand ambassador.

== Controversies ==
During Sri Lanka's win in all-important clash against Bangladesh during the 2022 Asia Cup group stage match, he went onto mock the Bangladeshi team with his Naagin dance which was a talking point in social media with netizens calling him for his amusing inappropriate code of conduct and antics.

In November 2022, he was fined US$5000 (equivalent to Sri Lanka Rupees 1.8 million) and was also reprimanded with a hefty one-year suspension from all forms of cricket by a three-member committee appointed by the Sri Lanka Cricket who concluded that Chamika was found guilty of lighting an oil lamp to Lord Ganesha (with some reports claiming that Chamika had lighted oil lamp for superstitious purposes and some reports claim that he actually lighted the oil lamp to Lord Buddha) at the hotel where he stayed during the course of the 2022 ICC Men's T20 World Cup in Australia. It was revealed that Chamika had left the incense sticks unattended and hence causing a greater danger and possible threat of fire at the hotel premises. He was also reported to have involved in an altercation and had heated exchanges with an outsider at a casino in Brisbane just hours before Sri Lanka's T20 World Cup match against Afghanistan.

A leaked report of national chief selector Pramodya Wickremasinghe claimed that Chamika was more keen on extra-curricular activities than focusing on national commitments during the 2022 ICC T20 World Cup in Australia. The report further highlighted that Chamika Karunaratne had even skipped training sessions just to meet and accommodate female companions at his hotel room during the middle of the ICC T20 World Cup showpiece in Australia. It was further revealed that Chamika had even lied by saying he was unwell whenever he missed the crucial training sessions during the T20 World Cup campaign. The report also claimed that Chamika Karunaratne was more interested and focused on meeting the ladies of Sri Lankan origin who have been domiciled in Australia. Another revelation from Wickremasinghe's report is that Chamika had allegedly harassed a married woman in Australia which included indecent proposals made by Chamika towards the said woman. The matter came into light when the husband of the particular married woman contacted the team manager of the Sri Lankan national cricket team. Wickremasinghe also wanted Chamika to immediately undergo a psychological counselling before making a comeback return to the national set-up.

He was dropped from Sri Lankan squad for the home bilateral ODI series against Afghanistan due to his poor run of form in international cricket and his axing even raised eyebrows of many including the sports minister Roshan Ranasinghe who expressed his unhappiness and disappointment over the removal of Chamika Karunaratne from the ODI squad and he also requested a report from SLC regarding the matter. The sports ministry also delayed the approval of the national ODI squad for the series against touring Afghanistan mainly owing to Chamika's ousting from the team. It was also revealed that current national head coach of Sri Lanka, Chris Silverwood openly shown no interest in having Chamika back into the national side after Silverwood had lost trust on him. However, Sunday Observer spotlighted that the rationale behind Chamika Karunaratne's axing is that he did not endorse and did not support the born-again cult. Further, Sunday Observer claimed that there is a hidden mafia in the name of so-called born-again cult group which has been forcing the national players to follow their religious practices in order to retain their places in national team.
