= Pramod Madushan =

Sri Lankan cricketer (born 1993)

Personal information
- Full name: Pramod Madushan Liyanagamage
- Born: 14 December 1993 (age 32); Hambantota, Sri Lanka
- Batting: Right-handed
- Bowling: Right arm medium-fast
- Role: Bowler

International information
- National side: Sri Lanka (2022-present)
- ODI debut (cap 205): 24 June 2022 v Australia
- Last ODI: 24 January 2026 v England
- T20I debut (cap 98): 9 September 2022 v Pakistan
- Last T20I: 19 February 2026 v Zimbabwe

Career statistics
Competition	ODI	T20I	FC	LA
Matches	9	8	41	85
Runs scored	28	2	391	295
Batting average	5.60	1.00	10.28	11.34
100s/50s	0/0	0/0	0/0	0/0
Top score	15	1*	33	27*
Balls bowled	362	157	4,330	3,115
Wickets	13	12	81	108
Bowling average	32.76	18.83	36.59	26.31
5 wickets in innings	0	0	3	1
10 wickets in match	0	0	0	0
Best bowling	4/75	4/34	5/69	5/48
Catches/stumpings	4/–	4/–	13/–	26/–
Medal record
Men's cricket
Representing Sri Lanka
Asian Games
Bronze medal – third place	2026 Aichi–Nagoya	Team
- Source: Cricinfo, 15 February 2025

Pramod Madushan Liyanagamage (born 14 December 1993) is a professional Sri Lankan cricketer who currently plays Twenty20 internationals for the national team. He is a past pupil of Theraputta National School, Hambantota.

== Domestic career ==
He made his first-class debut for Tamil Union Cricket and Athletic Club in the 2014–15 Premier Trophy on 5 February 2015. He made his List A debut for Jaffna District in the 2016–17 Districts One Day Tournament on 15 March 2017. In April 2018, he was named in Kandy's squad for the 2018 Super Provincial One Day Tournament. In July 2022, he was signed by the Dambulla Giants for the third edition of the Lanka Premier League.

== International career ==
In June 2022, he was named in the Sri Lanka A squad for their matches against Australia A during Australia's tour of Sri Lanka. Later the same month, he was named in Sri Lanka's One Day International (ODI) squad, also for their series against Australia. He made his ODI debut on 24 June 2022, for Sri Lanka against Australia.

In August 2022, he was named in Sri Lanka's T20I squad for the 2022 Asia Cup. He made his T20I debut on 9 September 2022, against Pakistan.
