= Bhanuka Rajapaksa =

Sri Lankan cricketer (born 1991)

Personal information
- Full name: Pramod Bhanuka Bandara Rajapaksa
- Born: 24 October 1991 (age 35); Colombo, Sri Lanka
- Nickname: Bhanu, Sixer Raja
- Batting: Left-handed
- Bowling: Right-arm medium
- Role: Top-order batter , Occasional wicket-keeper

International information
- National side: Sri Lanka (2019–present)
- ODI debut (cap 201): 18 July 2021 v India
- Last ODI: 4 September 2021 v South Africa
- T20I debut (cap 83): 5 October 2019 v Pakistan
- Last T20I: 2 January 2025 v New Zealand

Domestic team information
- Years: Team
- 2009/10: Barisal Division
- 2009/10–2012/13: Sinhalese Sports Club
- 2019/20: Cumilla Warriors
- 2022–2023: Punjab Kings
- 2023: Peshawar Zalmi
- 2023–2024: Galle Marvels
- 2024: Durban's Super Giants
- 2024/25: Lahore Qalandars
- 2025: Hobart Hurricanes
- 2026: Jaffna Kings

Career statistics
Competition	ODI	T20I	FC	LA
Matches	5	44	80	126
Runs scored	89	733	4,152	2,953
Batting average	17.80	22.90	35.48	27.85
100s/50s	0/1	0/3	9/21	3/17
Top score	65	77	268	107
Balls bowled	0	0	2,544	627
Wickets	0	0	47	15
Bowling average	–	–	29.80	32.33
5 wickets in innings	&0	0	0	0
10 wickets in match	0	0	0	0
Best bowling	–	–	4/59	2/16
Catches/stumpings	0/–	10/–	67/–	49/2
- Source: Cricinfo, 17 March 2025

Pramod Bhanuka Bandara Rajapaksa (born 24 October 1991), popularly known as Bhanuka Rajapaksa, is a professional Sri Lankan cricketer, who plays limited over internationals for the national team. He is a left-handed batsman who bowls right-arm medium. He was born in Colombo. Despite a prolific domestic career, Rajapaksa only made his international debut when he was called up for the T20I series against Pakistan in 2019, ten years after his first-class debut.

In July 2021, he was given a suspended ban from all forms of cricket for one year by the Sri Lanka Cricket for breach of contract and for not gaining the required permission from SLC to give media interviews.

== Early career ==
Rajapaksa began his cricket career as a student of Royal College Colombo. He was a key player in the Royal College team both as a batsman and a dependable medium pace bowler. His other sporting interests include squash and swimming.

Rajapaksa was selected for the 2010 Under-19 World Cup in New Zealand as a batsman. He finished as the leading run-scorer for Sri Lanka in the tournament with 253 runs. He had an excellent tour of Australia with the U19 team in 2009, smashing 154 off 111 balls in the second U19 ODI, and ending the series as the leading run-scorer. He compares his batting style to Adam Gilchrist's. His score of 154* is the second-highest individual score for Sri Lanka in U19 ODI cricket. Rajapaksa was the first Sri Lankan U19 cricketer to score 150 in a U19 ODI innings. He was also the first Sri Lankan U19 player to amass 1000 Youth ODI runs.

In 2011, Bhanuka became only the fourth individual to be adjudged as the 'Schoolboy Cricketer of the Year' twice in the country's premier school sector awarding ceremony, the Observer-Mobitel Schoolboy Cricketer of the Year. He was also adjudged the Young Emerging Player of the Under 19 Category at the CEAT Sri Lanka Cricket Awards 2011.

== Domestic and T20 franchise career ==
In domestic cricket, Rajapaksa initially represented the Sinhalese Sports Club in Sri Lankan domestic cricket and has also played for Barisal Blazers in Bangladesh's NCL T20 Bangladesh.

In April 2018, he was named in Galle's squad for the 2018 Super Provincial One Day Tournament. In August 2018, he was named in Kandy's squad the 2018 SLC T20 League. In March 2019, he was named in Dambulla's squad for the 2019 Super Provincial One Day Tournament.

During 2019 Premier season, Rajapaksa scored a career high 268 in 173 balls vs Ports Authorities for BRC at Moors Grounds, hitting 19 sixes and 22 fours in the innings. During Sri Lanka A's tour of India in 2019, in the second unofficial test vs India A, Rajapaksa scored 110 runs in 112 balls with 17 fours and 3 sixes at KSCA grounds, Hubli.

In October 2020, he was drafted by the Galle Gladiators for the inaugural edition of the Lanka Premier League. In August 2021, he was named in the SLC Greys team for the 2021 SLC Invitational T20 League tournament. In November 2021, he was selected to play for the Galle Gladiators following the players' draft for the 2021 Lanka Premier League.

In February 2022, he was bought by the Punjab Kings in the auction for the 2022 Indian Premier League tournament. In July 2022, he was signed by the Dambulla Giants for the third edition of the Lanka Premier League.

In February 2023, Rajapaksa made his Pakistan Super League debut with Peshawar Zalmi.

In May 2026, he was signed by Jaffna Kings as the "Local Icon Player" for the 2026 Lanka Premier League.

== International career ==
In September 2019, he was named in Sri Lanka's Twenty20 International (T20I) squad for the series against Pakistan in Pakistan. He made his T20I debut for Sri Lanka against Pakistan on 5 October 2019, scoring 32 runs off 22 balls in a 64 run victory. In the second match, Rajapaksa scored 77 runs off 48 balls as Sri Lanka beat Pakistan by 35 runs. He was adjudged the player of the match for his batting performance.

In July 2021, he was named in Sri Lanka's squad for their series against India. He made his One Day International (ODI) debut on 18 July 2021, for Sri Lanka against India. In September 2021, Rajapaksa was named in Sri Lanka's squad for the 2021 ICC Men's T20 World Cup.

On 5 January 2022, Rajapaksa announced his international retirement at the age of 30 in a letter written to the SLC which cited:. "I have very carefully considered my position as a player, husband and am taking this decision looking forward to fatherhood and associated familial obligations,". However, on 13 January 2022, he withdrew retirement letter at a request of sports minister.

In June 2022, he was named for the ODI series against Australia. During the 2022 Asia Cup, Rajapaksa made several match winning knocks against Afghanistan twice and India. In the opening match, Sri Lanka was bowled out for 105 runs where Rajapaksa was the top scorer for Sri Lanka with 38 runs. However, Sri Lanka lost the match by 8 wickets. In the Super 4 stage, Sri Lanka met Afghanistan again, but won the match this time by 4 wickets. In the steep chase of 175 posted by Afghans, Rajapaksa hammered 14-ball 31 runs and made 15-ball 32 run partnership with Danushka Gunathilake. The chase of 176 also recorded as the highest T20I chase at Sharjah Cricket Stadium. In the final against Pakistan, Sri Lanka batted first and restricted to 58/5 in 8.5 overs. However, Rajapaksa made two match-winning partnerships with Wanindu Hasaranga (58-runs) and Chamika Karunaratne (unbeaten 54 runs), where Sri Lanka posted 170 runs. Sri Lanka eventually won the match and became sixth time Asia Cup champions. Rajapaksa was adjudged player of the match for his performance. His unbeaten innings of 71 is also recorded as the highest individual score while batting at No. 5 or lower in a men's T20I knockout game.

In May 2024, he was named as a reserve player in Sri Lanka’s squad for the 2024 ICC Men's T20 World Cup tournament. After strong performances in franchise cricket, he was recalled for the T20I series against West Indies in October 2024.

== Controversy ==
After being left out for the West Indies tour and England tour in 2021, Rajapaksa expressed his disappointment over being dropped from the team based on fitness standards. In a YouTube interview, he criticized the Sri Lankan selectors and Sri Lanka cricket authorities for being inconsistent with their policies and insisted that the priority should be given to the on field performances of players instead of fitness levels of players. However, Sri Lanka cricket head coach Mickey Arthur criticized Rajapaksa calling him a "comfort zone cricketer" on the field and revealed that he has failed to comply with the skin fold tests in order to fulfill the required fitness levels to play in international cricket matches.

== Personal life ==
Rajapaksa is married to his long time partner Sandrine Perera, where the wedding was celebrated on 5 April 2021.
