= 2020 Galle Gladiators season =

Overview of Galle Gladiators in 2020

Galle Gladiators
2020 season
- Coach: Moin Khan
- Captain: Shahid Afridi; Bhanuka Rajapaksa
- 2020 LPL: Runners-up
- Most runs: Danushka Gunathilaka (476)
- Most wickets: Dhananjaya Lakshan (13)

The Galle Gladiators (abbreviated as GG) is a franchise cricket team which played in the inaugural season of the Lanka Premier League. The team is based in Galle, Southern Province, Sri Lanka. The team remained under the captaincy of Pakistani cricketer, Shahid Afridi, for the first three matches. However, due to an emergency, the captain left the league for the remaining matches of the tournament, and Bhanuka Rajapaksa assumed the captaincy. The team was coached by Pakistani cricket coach Moin Khan. The team is owned by Pakistani organizer Nadeem Omar, who also owns the Pakistan Super League's Quetta Gladiators.

The team qualified for the semi-finals in the 2020 season after winning only two out of eight matches, due to having a higher run rate than its competitor, Kandy Tuskers. The team qualified for the final after trouncing Colombo Kings in the semi-finals. However, they lost in the final to the Jaffna Stallions.

== Season summary ==
In the Galle Gladiators' first-ever LPL match, they played against the Jaffna Stallions. They won the toss and elected to bat first. However, they did not accomplish much besides 58 runs off 23 balls from their captain Shahid Afridi. Stallions won by 8 wickets. Rain affected the second game against the Colombo Kings, with the match being reduced to 5 overs per side. At the end, the Kings batted as Andre Russell hit an unbeaten 65 runs to help the Kings win by 34 runs over the Gladiators.

In the third game of their campaign, the Gladiators came up against the Kandy Tuskers. They conceded 196/5 to the Tuskers batsman, but apart from 82 runs off 53 balls from Danushka Gunathilaka, the Gladiators lost this match. In their fourth game, against the Stallions, the Gladiators' batting once again collapsed, aside from another 50 runs by Gunathilaka. The Gladiators' bowling did not fare much better, as they allowed the Stallions to chase the target.

Their fifth game, against the Dambulla Viiking, was a much closer affair. Gunathilaka hit his third fifty in a row and he was well-supported by wicket-keeper batsman Azam Khan, who also hit a fifty. However, the Gladiators lost the game by nine runs. In their sixth game, the Gladiators fared much better, bowling the Colombo Kings out for 170 runs. This was largely due to Pakistani pacer Mohammad Amir, who took five wickets conceding 26 runs, taking the LPL's first-ever 5 wickets in the process. The Gladiators chased this total down to give them their first win of the season.

The Gladiators came into the seventh game facing the Dambulla Viiking. Samiullah Shinwari's 46 runs off 20 balls helped the Viikings chase down the target of 168 runs. The Gladiator's eighth match, against the Kandy Tuskers, was a virtual quarter-final, with the winner going into the semi-final and the loser going out. Gunathilaka once again was the man with the bat for Galle, as he hit an unbeaten 94 runs to help the Gladiators chase down the target of 126 runs and qualify for the semi-final. This meant the Gladiators finished in fourth place on the table.

The Gladiators opposed Colombo Kings in the semi-final. They were impeccable with the bowling: the pace trio of Mohammad Amir, Nuwan Thushara, and Dhananjaya Lakshan gave away just 80 runs, in 12 overs, picking up 4 wickets. However, with the batting, the Gladiators had enough opportunity to steal the win from Kings. When the game reached its final over, the Gladiators needed 15 off 6 balls. Lakshan struck two sixes, and later Lakshan Sandakan concluded the game by striking a four, giving the Gladiators the win, and they advanced to the final.

The team opposed Jaffna Stallions in the 2020 LPL Final. Pakistani cricketer Shoaib Malik thumped 46 runs off 35 balls and the Stallions set the target of 189 runs. The Gladiators' performance deteriorated, however, as skipper Lakshan hammered 40 off 17 balls, and Pakistani cricketer Azam Khan scored 36 runs off 17 balls. The tournament ended with the Stallions winning the inaugural Lanka Premier League trophy after recording a comprehensive 53-run win over the Gladiators.

== Squad ==
- Players with international caps are listed in **bold**
- Ages given as of 26 November 2020, the date the first match in the tournament was played

No.	Name	Nationality	Date of birth (age)	Batting style	Bowling style	Notes
Batsmen
70	**Danushka Gunathilaka**	Sri Lanka	17 March 1991 (aged 29)	Left-handed	Right-arm offbreak	
25	**Bhanuka Rajapaksa**	Sri Lanka	24 October 1991 (aged 29)	Left-handed	Right-arm medium-fast	Vice Captain
41	**Colin Ingram**	South Africa	3 July 1985 (aged 35)	Left-handed	Right-arm legspin	Overseas
3	**Hazratullah Zazai**	Afghanistan	23 March 1998 (aged 22)	Left-handed	Slow left-arm orthodox	Overseas
93	**Ahsan Ali**	Pakistan	10 December 1993 (aged 26)	Right-handed	Right-arm leg break	Overseas
N/A	Sahan Arachchige	Sri Lanka	13 May 1996 (aged 24)	Left-handed	Right-arm offbreak	
All-rounders
34	**Shehan Jayasuriya**	Sri Lanka	12 September 1991 (aged 29)	Left-handed	Right-arm offbreak	
4	**Milinda Siriwardana**	Sri Lanka	4 December 1985 (aged 34)	Left-handed	Slow left-arm orthodox	
10	**Akila Dananjaya**	Sri Lanka	4 October 1993 (aged 27)	Left-handed		
10	**Shahid Afridi**	Pakistan	1 March 1975 (aged 45)	Right-handed	Right-arm legspin	Captain, Overseas marquee player
N/A	Chanaka Ruwansiri	Sri Lanka	14 October 1989 (aged 31)	Right-handed	Right-arm offbreak	
17	Dhananjaya Lakshan	Sri Lanka	5 October 1998 (aged 22)	Left-handed	Right-arm	
N/A	Duvindu Tillakaratne	Sri Lanka	9 September 1996 (aged 24)	Right-handed	Left-arm orthodox	
Wicket-keepers
54	**Sarfaraz Ahmed**	Pakistan	22 May 1987 (aged 33)	Right-handed	Right-arm offbreak	Overseas
59	**Chadwick Walton**	West Indies	3 July 1985 (aged 35)	Right-handed	—	Overseas
45	Azam Khan	Pakistan	10 August 1998 (aged 22)	Right-handed	—	Overseas
Bowlers
99	**Lasith Malinga**	Sri Lanka	28 August 1983 (aged 37)	Right-handed	Right-arm fast	Icon player
85	**Lakshan Sandakan**	Sri Lanka	10 June 1991 (aged 29)	Right-handed	Left-arm wrist-spin	
78	**Asitha Fernando**	Sri Lanka	31 July 1997 (aged 23)	Right-handed	Right-arm medium-fast	
5	**Mohammad Amir**	Pakistan	13 April 1992 (aged 28)	Left-handed	Left-arm fast	Overseas
58	**Waqas Maqsood**	Pakistan	4 November 1987 (aged 33)	Right-handed	Left-arm medium fast	Overseas
N/A	Mohamed Shiraz	Sri Lanka	13 February 1995 (aged 25)	Right-handed	Right-arm fast	
4	Nuwan Thushara	Sri Lanka	6 August 1994 (aged 26)	Right-handed	Right-arm medium-fast	
23	Abdul Nasir	Pakistan	25 December 1998 (aged 21)	Right-handed	Right-arm offbreak	Overseas

- Sources

== Administration and support staff ==
Galle Gladiators is owned by Pakistani organizer Nadeem Omar, who also owns the Pakistan Super League's team Quetta Gladiators. Former Pakistani cricketer Zaheer Abbas was appointed as the team's chairman for the season. The team was coached by Pakistani cricketer Moin Khan, and Upul Chandana was assistant coach. Pakistani cricketers Wasim Akram and Azam Khan were the team mentor and manager, respectively.

Position	Name	Ref.
Chairman	Zaheer Abbas	
Head coach	Moin Khan	
Assistant coach	Upul Chandana	
Mentor	Wasim Akram	
Manager	Azam Khan	

== Season standings ==
=== League table ===
Pos	Team	Pld	W	L	NR	Pts	NRR
1	Colombo Kings	8	6	2	0	12	0.448
2	Dambulla Viiking	8	5	2	1	11	−0.087
3	Jaffna Stallions (C)	8	4	3	1	9	0.788
4	Galle Gladiators (R)	8	2	6	0	4	−0.203
5	Kandy Tuskers	8	2	6	0	4	−0.890

Source: ESPNCricinfo
- The top four teams qualified for the playoffs
- Advanced to semifinals

=== Matches ===
denotes the winning team.denotes the losing team.
Date	Opponent	Toss	Result	MotM	Notes
27 November	Jaffna Stallions	Galle Gladiators elected to bat	Jaffna Stallions won by 8 wickets	Avishka Fernando	
28 November	Colombo Kings	Galle Gladiators elected to field	Colombo Kings won by 34 runs	Andre Russell	
30 November	Kandy Tuskers	Galle Gladiators elected to field	Kandy Tuskers won by 25 runs	Brendan Taylor	
3 December	Jaffna Stallions	Galle Gladiators elected to bat	Jaffna Stallions won by 5 wickets	Avishka Fernando	
5 December	Dambulla Viiking	Dambulla Viiking elected to bat	Dambulla Viiking won by 9 runs	Anwar Ali	
7 December	Colombo Kings	Colombo Kings elected to bat	Galle Gladiators won by 8 wickets	Mohammad Amir	
9 December	Dambulla Viiking	Dambulla Viiking elected to field	Dambulla Viiking won by 4 wickets	Samiullah Shinwari	
10 December	Kandy Tuskers	Galle Gladiators elected to field	Galle Gladiators won by 9 wickets	Danushka Gunathilaka	
13 December	Colombo Kings	Galle Gladiators elected to field	Galle Gladiators won by 2 wickets	Dhananjaya Lakshan	Won the semi–final
16 December	Jaffna Stallions	Jaffna Stallions elected to bat	Jaffna Stallions won by 53 runs	Shoaib Malik	Lost the final

== Statistics ==
=== Most runs ===
The top scorer of Galle Gladiators was Danushka Gunathilaka, who also scored the most runs in 2020 season of LPL than any other team batsman, though the team won only 3 matches. Azam Khan was the second top scorer who made 215 runs. The third and fourth positions were taken by Bhanuka Rajapaksa and Shehan Jayasuriya, respectively. Like the second position, the fifth position was taken by Pakistani cricketer Ahsan Ali, who scored 117 matches in 7 matches.

* indicates a player who remained not out.
Batsman	Matches	Runs	Highest score
Danushka Gunathilaka	10	476	94*
Azam Khan	10	215	55
Bhanuka Rajapaksa	10	180	40
Shehan Jayasuriya	10	119	39
Ahsan Ali	7	117	56

=== Most wickets ===
Dhananjaya Lakshan took 13 wickets in 8 matches, placing second in the season's for most wickets. Lakshan Sandakan took 12 wickets. The only fifer of the season was taken by Mohammad Amir, a Pakistani bowler.

Notation 5/26 denotes 5 wickets obtained by 26 runs.
Bowler	Matches	Wickets	Best bowling
Dhananjaya Lakshan	8	13	3/36
Lakshan Sandakan	8	12	3/32
Mohammad Amir	10	11	5/26
Sahan Arachchige	5	4	2/24
Shehan Jayasuriya	10	4	1/0

== Awards and achievements ==
Galle Gladiators won only three matches in the season, therefore three man of the match awards were given to the team players. The first award was given to Mohammad Amir for taking the only fifer in 2020 LPL against Colombo Kings. Danushka Gunathilaka also got an award for making 94 runs in a single inning. The third award was given to Dhananjaya Lakshan.

Date	Award	Player	Opponent	Result	Contribution	Ref.
7 December	Man of the Match	Mohammad Amir	Colombo Kings	Won by 8 wickets	5/26	
10 December	Man of the Match	Danushka Gunathilaka	Kandy Tuskers	Won by 9 wickets	94* (66)	
14 December	Man of the Match	Dhananjaya Lakshan	Colombo Kings	Won by 2 wickets	31* (23)	
