= 2020 Dambulla Viiking season =

Overview of the Sri Lankan cricket franchise in 2020

Dambulla Viiking
2020 season
- Coach: Owais Shah
- Captain: Dasun Shanaka
- 2020 LPL: Semi-finalist
- Most runs: Dasun Shanaka (278)
- Most wickets: Anwar Ali (9)

Dambulla Viiking (abbreviated as DV) is a franchise cricket team which competed in the inaugural season of Lanka Premier League (LPL). For the 2020 season, the team was captained by Dasun Shanaka and coached by Owais Shah. Based in Dambulla, Central Province, Sri Lanka, the team is owned by Bollywood film actor and producer Sachiin J. Joshi. In the inaugural season, it changed its name from Dambulla Hawks to Dambulla Lions, and ten days later again changed its name to Dambulla Viiking.

The team qualified for the semi-finals of this inaugural season of LPL after winning five out of eight matches, but lost to Jaffna Stallions in the semi-finals.

== Season summary ==
In the Dambulla Viiking's first-ever LPL game, against the Kandy Tuskers, they scored 195/4 of their 20 overs. The game was shortened by rain, with the Viiking winning by four runs according to DLS. In their second match, they played against the Jaffna Stallions, who scored 218/7 thanks to Stallions captain Thisara Perera, who scored an unbeaten 97 runs. The Viikings could not chase the total down, losing by 66 runs.

In their third match, they played against the Colombo Kings. The Kings' batting fluctuated, as they were bowled out for 149 runs in response to the Viiking's 175 runs. This brought the Kings' unbeaten run to an end. In Game 4 they competed against the Kandy Tuskers. The Tuskers made 156 runs with a loss of 6 wickets. In response to the Viiking's 157/7, winning the game by 5 wickets.

The Viiking's Game 5, against the Galle Gladiators, was a much closer affair. Niroshan Dickwella hit 60 runs. In response, Gladiators' batsman Danushka Gunathilaka hit his third fifty in a row and he was well supported by wicket-keeper batsman Azam Khan, who also hit a fifty. However, the Viiking won this time by 9 runs. Game 6 was a washout, with the Viiking at 42/3 before the rain hit.

In Game 7 against Galle, the Viiking's chances looked slim before Samiullah Shinwari's 46 runs off 20 balls helped the Viikings chase down the target of 168 runs. In the last game of the group stage against the Colombo Kings, Kings player Qais Ahmed performed with both bat and ball. He first took two wickets by giving 23 runs from his 4 overs before hitting 50 runs off 22 balls, and defeated Viiking with a 6 wickets loss. This meant that the Dambulla Viiking finished 2nd on the table.

Viiking played against the Stallions in the second semi-finals, but lost the match by a margin of 37 runs.

== Squad ==
- Players with international caps are listed in **bold**.
- Ages given as of 26 November 2020, the date that the first match was played in the tournament

| No. | Name | Nationality | Date of birth (age) | Batting style | Bowling style | Notes |
Batsmen
| 80 | **Oshada Fernando** | Sri Lanka | 15 April 1992 (aged 28) | Right-handed | Right-arm leg-break | |
| 44 | **Upul Tharanga** | Sri Lanka | 2 February 1985 (aged 35) | Left-handed | — | |
| 23 | **Angelo Perera** | Sri Lanka | 23 February 1990 (aged 30) | Right-handed | Slow left-arm orthodox | |
| 10 | **David Miller** | South Africa | 10 June 1989 (aged 31) | Right-handed | Right-arm offbreak | Marquee overseas player |
| 54 | **Lendl Simmons** | West Indies | 25 January 1985 (aged 35) | Right-handed | Right-arm medium-fast | Overseas |
| 92 | **Sohaib Maqsood** | Pakistan | 15 March 1987 (aged 33) | Right-handed | Right-arm legbreak | Overseas |
| 88 | Pulina Tharanga | Sri Lanka | 23 January 1993 (aged 27) | Right-handed | Right-arm leg-break | |
| 15 | Ashen Bandara | Sri Lanka | 23 November 1998 (aged 22) | Right-handed | Right-arm legbreak | |
| N/A | Kavindu Nadeeshan | Sri Lanka | 31 August 2001 (aged 19) | Right-handed | Legbreak | |
All-rounders
| 7 | **Dasun Shanaka** | Sri Lanka | 9 September 1991 (aged 29) | Right-handed | Right-arm medium | Captain, Icon player |
| 45 | **Lahiru Madushanka** | Sri Lanka | 12 September 1992 (aged 28) | Right-handed | Right-arm fast-medium | |
| 26 | **Carlos Brathwaite** | West Indies | 18 July 1988 (aged 32) | Right-handed | Right-arm medium-fast | Overseas |
| 22 | **Samit Patel** | England | 30 November 1984 (aged 35) | Right-handed | Slow left-arm orthodox | Overseas |
| N/A | **Paul Stirling** | Ireland | 3 September 1990 (aged 30) | Right-handed | Right-arm offbreak | Overseas |
| N/A | **Aftab Alam** | Afghanistan | 13 November 1992 (aged 28) | Right-handed | Right-arm fast | Overseas |
| 84 | **Anwar Ali** | Pakistan | 25 November 1987 (aged 33) | Right-handed | Right-arm fast-medium | Overseas |
| 45 | **Samiullah Shinwari** | Afghanistan | 25 January 1985 (aged 35) | Right-handed | Right-arm leg spin | Overseas |
| 5 | Ramesh Mendis | Sri Lanka | 7 July 1995 (aged 25) | Right-handed | Right-arm offbreak | |
Wicket-keepers
| 48 | **Niroshan Dickwella** | Sri Lanka | 23 June 1993 (aged 27) | Left-handed | — | |
| 23 | **Sadeera Samarawickrama** | Sri Lanka | 30 August 1995 (aged 25) | Right-handed | — | |
| 23 | **Kamran Akmal** | Pakistan | 13 January 1982 (aged 38) | Right-handed | Right-arm medium | Overseas |
Bowlers
| 8 | **Lahiru Kumara** | Sri Lanka | 13 February 1997 (aged 23) | Left-handed | Right-arm fast | |
| 65 | **Kasun Rajitha** | Sri Lanka | 1 June 1993 (aged 27) | Right-handed | Right-arm medium-fast | |
| 3 | **Malinda Pushpakumara** | Sri Lanka | 24 March 1987 (aged 33) | Right-handed | Slow left-arm orthodox | |
| 32 | **Sudeep Tyagi** | India | 17 September 1989 (aged 31) | Right-handed | Right-arm fast-medium | Overseas |
| N/A | Dilshan Madushanka | Sri Lanka | 18 September 2000 (aged 20) | Right-handed | Left-arm fast-medium | |
| 52 | Sachindu Colombage | Sri Lanka | 21 February 1998 (aged 22) | Right-handed | Right-arm legbreak | |

- Sources

== Administration and support staff ==
Bollywood actor and producer Sachiin J. Joshi owns the Dambulla Viiking team. For the season, former English cricketer Owais Shah was appointed as the head coach of team.

== Season standings ==
=== League table ===
| Pos | Team | Pld | W | L | NR | Pts | NRR |
|---|---|---|---|---|---|---|---|
| 1 | Colombo Kings | 8 | 6 | 2 | 0 | 12 | 0.448 |
| 2 | Dambulla Viiking | 8 | 5 | 2 | 1 | 11 | −0.087 |
| 3 | Jaffna Stallions (C) | 8 | 4 | 3 | 1 | 9 | 0.788 |
| 4 | Galle Gladiators (R) | 8 | 2 | 6 | 0 | 4 | −0.203 |
| 5 | Kandy Tuskers | 8 | 2 | 6 | 0 | 4 | −0.890 |

Source: ESPNCricinfo
- The top four teams qualified for the playoffs
- Advanced to semifinals

=== Matches ===
denotes the winner team. denotes the loser team. denotes no result.
| Date | Opponent | Toss | Result | Man of the match | Notes |
|---|---|---|---|---|---|
| 28 November | Kandy Tuskers | Kandy Tuskers elected to field. | Dambulla Viiking won by 4 runs. | Dasun Shanaka | Won by DLS method. |
| 30 November | Jaffna Stallions | Dambulla Viiking elected to field. | Jaffna Stallions won by 66 runs. | Thisara Perera | |
| 1 December | Colombo Kings | Dambulla Viiking elected to bat. | Dambulla Viiking won by 28 runs. | Dasun Shanaka | |
| 3 December | Kandy Tuskers | Kandy Tuskers elected to bat. | Dambulla Viiking won by 5 wickets. | Angelo Perera | |
| 5 December | Galle Gladiators | Dambulla Viiking elected to bat. | Dambulla Viiking won by 9 runs. | Anwar Ali | |
| 7 December | Jaffna Stallions | Jaffna Stallions elected to field. | Cancelled due to rain. | | |
| 9 December | Galle Gladiators | Galle Gladiators elected to field. | Dambulla Viiking won by 4 wickets. | Samiullah Shinwari | |
| 11 December | Colombo Kings | Colombo Kings elected to field. | Colombo Kings won by 6 wickets. | Qais Ahmad | |
| 14 December | Jaffna Stallions | Dambulla Viiking elected to field. | Jaffna Stallions won by 37 runs. | Johnson Charles | Lost the semi-final. |

== Statistics ==
=== Most runs ===
The top scorer of Dambulla Viiking was Dasun Shanaka, who scored 278 runs in nine matches. The second position was attained by Niroshan Dickwella, who scored 270 runs. The third and fourth positions were attained by Angelo Perera and Upul Tharanga, respectively, and the fifth position was held by English cricketer Samit Patel.

* indicates a player who remained not out.
| Name | Matches | Runs | Highest score |
|---|---|---|---|
| Dasun Shanaka | 9 | 278 | 73 |
| Niroshan Dickwella | 9 | 270 | 65 |
| Angelo Perera | 7 | 227 | 74* |
| Upul Tharanga | 8 | 196 | 77 |
| Samit Patel | 9 | 189 | 58 |

=== Most wickets ===
Anwar Ali, a Pakistani cricketer who took nine wickets in eight matches, was followed by Malinda Pushpakumara, who took eight wickets. Ramesh Mendis and Kasun Rajitha both took six wickets.

Notation 3/37 denotes 3 wickets obtained by 37 runs.
| Name | Matches | Wickets | Best bowling |
|---|---|---|---|
| Anwar Ali | 8 | 9 | 3/37 |
| Malinda Pushpakumara | 8 | 8 | 2/19 |
| Samit Patel | 9 | 7 | 2/26 |
| Ramesh Mendis | 7 | 6 | 2/28 |
| Kasun Rajitha | 6 | 6 | 2/16 |

== Awards and achievements ==
Dambulla Viiking won five matches, so five man of the match awards were given to the team's players. The first award was presented to Dasun Shanaka for scoring 73 runs off 37 balls, and he also won the second award. The third award was presented to Angelo Perera for scoring 67 runs off 49 balls. The fourth award was bestowed to Pakistani cricketer Anwar Ali for picking up three wickets, and the last award was awarded to Afghan cricketer Samiullah Shinwari.

| Date | Award | Player | Opponent | Result | Contribution | Ref. |
|---|---|---|---|---|---|---|
| 28 November | Man of the Match | Dasun Shanaka | Kandy Tuskers | Won by 4 runs (DLS method). | 73 (37) | |
| 1 December | Man of the Match | Dasun Shanaka | Colombo Kings | Won by 28 runs. | 56 (34) | |
| 3 December | Man of the Match | Angelo Perera | Kandy Tuskers | Won by 5 wickets. | 67 (49) | |
| 5 December | Man of the Match | Anwar Ali | Galle Gladiators | Won by 9 runs. | 3/37 | |
| 9 December | Man of the Match | Samiullah Shinwari | Galle Gladiators | Won by 4 wickets. | 46* (20) | |
