= 2020 Jaffna Stallions season =

Overview of Jaffna Stallions in 2020

Jaffna Stallions
2020 season
- Coach: Thilina Kandamby
- Captain: Thisara Perera
- 2020 LPL: Champions
- Most runs: Avishka Fernando (275)
- Most wickets: Wanindu Hasaranga (17)

The Jaffna Stallions (abbreviated as JS) is a franchise cricket team which competed in inaugural season of Lanka Premier League (LPL). For the 2020 season, the team was captained by Thisara Perera and coached by Thilina Kandamby. The team qualified for the semi-finals after winning 4 out of 8 matches. However, the team had the highest run rate of all teams. They qualified for the final by defeating Dambulla Viiking in the semi-final. The team won the final by defeating the Galle Gladiators.

== Season summary ==
In the first game of their history, the Stallions faced the Galle Gladiators. The Gladiators never really got going aside from a quick-fire 58 runs off 23 balls by their captain Shahid Afridi. In response, the Stallions chased down the target of 175/8 made by the Gladiators with three balls to spare winning the match by 8 wickets. In Game 2, a captain's innings from Thisara Perera helped propel the Stallions to 217/8 from their 20 overs against Dambulla Viiking's. In the Viiking innings, Pakistani bowler Usman Shinwari took three wickets to give the Stallions their second win of the season.

Perera was involved once again in the Stallions' third game. He scored 68 runs off 28 balls to get the Stallions to 185/8. Usman Shinwari was once again the pick of the bowlers, this time with 3/17 to hand the Stallions their third successive win. In Game 4, the Stallions beat the Gladiators a second time. This win was largely due to the Stallions opener, Avishka Fernando who scored 84 runs off 59 balls and hit five 6's. This meant that the Stallions were still unbeaten in the tournament after playing four games.

Game 5 of the Stallions' season came against the Colombo Kings. Jaffna scored 148/9 from their 20 overs, with Wanindu Hasaranga top-scoring with 41 runs. In response, the target was chased down by the Colombo Kings with six wickets to spare. This was the Stallions' first loss of the season. Unfortunately for the Stallions, their sixth game was washed out. However, they stayed at the top of the table on the basis of a superior net run rate. Two days later, they played their penultimate game of the league stage against the Kandy Tuskers. They were bowled out for 150 runs, with Shoaib Malik top-scoring with 59 runs. They could not replicate the Tuskers with the ball, losing the game by 6 wickets.

The last match of the group stage for the Stallions was against the Kings. Batting first, the Kings scored 173/4 largely due to Laurie Evans, who scored the first-ever Lanka Premier League hundred. In response, the Stallions could only score 167/6 from their 20 overs, losing their third successive game. However, they still qualified for the semi-finals in third place.

In the semi-final, they defeated Dambulla Viiking with a margin of 37 runs.

The team opposed Galle Gladiators in the final. The Stallions won the toss and elected to bat. Pakistani skilled cricketer Shoaib Malik thumped 46 runs off 35 balls, Thisara Perera scored quick fire 39 runs off 14 balls and the team set the target of 189 runs. The Gladiators' performance in the match deteriorated, however, as skipper Dhananjaya Lakshan hammered 40 runs off 17 balls and Pakistani cricketer Azam Khan scored 36 runs off 17 balls. The tournament ceased with the Stallions winning their first inaugural Lanka Premier League season after recording a comprehensive 53-run win over the Gladiators.

== Squad ==
- Players with international caps are listed in **bold**
- Ages given as of 26 November 2020, the date the first match was played in the tournament

	No.	Name	Nationality	Date of birth (aged)	Batting style	Bowling style	Notes
Batsmen
28	**Avishka Fernando**	Sri Lanka	5 April 1998 (aged 22)	Right-handed	Right-arm medium-fast		
29	**Dawid Malan**	England	3 September 1987 (aged 33)	Left-handed	Right-arm legbreak	Marquee overseas player	
45	**Asif Ali**	Pakistan	1 October 1991 (aged 29)	Right-handed	Right-arm offbreak	Overseas	
23	Nuwanidu Fernando	Sri Lanka	13 October 1999 (aged 21)	Right-handed	Right-arm offbreak		
All-rounders
1	**Thisara Perera**	Sri Lanka	3 April 1989 (aged 31)	Left-handed	Right-arm medium-fast	Captain, Icon player	
75	**Dhananjaya de Silva**	Sri Lanka	6 September 1991 (aged 29)	Right-handed	Right-arm offbreak		
13	**Wanindu Hasaranga**	Sri Lanka	29 July 1997 (aged 23)	Right-handed	Legbreak		
18	**Shoaib Malik**	Pakistan	1 February 1982 (aged 38)	Right-handed	Right-arm offbreak	Overseas	
10	**Ravi Bopara**	England	4 May 1985 (aged 35)	Right-handed	Right-arm medium	Overseas	
14	Charith Asalanka	Sri Lanka	29 June 1997 (aged 23)	Left-handed	right-arm offspin		
N/A	Theivendiram Dinoshan	Sri Lanka	26 March 2002 (aged 18)	Right-handed	Right-arm fast		
Wicket-keepers
18	**Minod Bhanuka**	Sri Lanka	29 April 1995 (aged 25)	Left-handed	—		
50	**Chaturanga de Silva**	Sri Lanka	17 January 1990 (aged 30)	Left-handed	Slow left-arm orthodox		
25	**Johnson Charles**	West Indies	14 January 1989 (aged 31)	Right-handed	Right-arm medium-fast	Overseas	
23	Tom Moores	England	4 September 1996 (aged 24)	Left-handed	—	Overseas	
Bowlers
82	**Suranga Lakmal**	Sri Lanka	10 March 1987 (aged 33)	Right-handed	Right-arm medium-fast		
N/A	**Binura Fernando**	Sri Lanka	12 July 1995 (aged 25)	Right-handed	Left-arm medium-fast		
N/A	**Prabath Jayasuriya**	Sri Lanka	5 November 1991 (aged 29)	Right-handed	Slow left-arm orthodox		
14	**Usman Shinwari**	Pakistan	5 January 1994 (aged 26)	Right-handed	Left-arm fast-medium	Overseas	
87	**Kyle Abbott**	South Africa	18 June 1987 (aged 33)	Right-handed	Right-arm fast-medium	Overseas	
74	**Duanne Olivier**	South Africa	9 May 1992 (aged 28)	Right-handed	Right-arm fast-medium	Overseas	
N/A	Maheesh Theekshana	Sri Lanka	1 January 2000 (aged 20)	Right-handed	Right-arm offbreak		
N/A	Kanagarathinam Kabilraj	Sri Lanka	12 July 1999 (aged 21)	Right-handed	Right-arm fast-medium		
N/A	Vijayakanth Viyaskanth	Sri Lanka	5 December 2001 (aged 18)	Right-handed	Legbreak		
N/A	Sebastianpillai Vijeyaraj	Sri Lanka	Right-handed	Right-arm fast			

- Sources

== Administration and support staff ==
Position	Name	Ref.
CEO	Anandan Arnold	
Mentor	Hemang Badani	
Head coach	Thilina Kandamby	
Fast bowling coach	Mario Villavarayan	
Spin bowling coach	Sachith Pathirana	
Fielding coach	Vimukthi Deshapriya	

== Season standings ==
=== League table ===
Pos	Team	Pld	W	L	NR	Pts	NRR
1	Colombo Kings	8	6	2	0	12	0.448
2	Dambulla Viiking	8	5	2	1	11	−0.087
3	Jaffna Stallions (C)	8	4	3	1	9	0.788
4	Galle Gladiators (R)	8	2	6	0	4	−0.203
5	Kandy Tuskers	8	2	6	0	4	−0.890

Source: ESPNCricinfo
- The top four teams qualified for the playoffs
- Advanced to semifinals

=== Matches ===
denotes the winning team. denotes the losing team. denotes no result.
Date	Opponent	Toss	Result	Man of the match	Notes
27 November	Galle Gladiators	Galle Gladiators elected to bat	Jaffna Stallions won by 8 runs	Avishka Fernando	
30 November	Dambulla Viiking	Dambulla Viiking elected to field	Jaffna Stallions won by 66 runs	Thisara Perera	
1 December	Kandy Tuskers	Jaffna Stallions elected to bat	Jaffna Stallions won by 54 runs	Thisara Perera	
3 December	Galle Gladiators	Galle Gladiators elected to bat	Jaffna Stallions won by 5 wickets	Avishka Fernando	
4 December	Colombo Kings	Colombo Kings elected to field	Colombo Kings won by 6 wickets	Dinesh Chandimal	
7 December	Dambulla Viiking	Jaffna Stallions elected to field	Cancelled due to rain		
9 December	Kandy Tuskers	Jaffna Stallions elected to bat	Kandy Tuskers won by 6 wickets	Asela Gunaratne	
10 December	Colombo Kings	Jaffna Stallions elected to field	Colombo Kings won by 6 runs	Laurie Evans	
14 December	Dambulla Viiking	Dambulla the elected to field	Jaffna Stallions won by 37 runs	Johnson Charles	Won the semi-final
16 December	Galle Gladiators	Jaffna Stallions elected to bat	Jaffna Stallions won by 53 runs	Shoaib Malik	Won the final

== Statistics ==
=== Most runs ===
* indicates a player who remained not out.
Batsman	Matches	Runs	Highest score
Avishka Fernando	9	275	92*
Thisara Perera	10	261	97*
Shoaib Malik	10	203	59
Johnson Charles	6	134	76
Wanindu Hasaranga	10	127	41

=== Most wickets ===
Notation 2/12 denotes 2 wickets obtained by 12 runs.
Bowler	Matches	Wickets	Best bowling
Wanindu Hasaranga	10	17	3/15
Duanne Olivier	9	10	4/44
Usman Shinwari	7	9	3/16
Suranga Lakmal	7	8	2/27
Thisara Perera	10	5	2/9

== Awards and achievements ==
Date	Award	Player	Opponent	Result	Contribution	Ref.
27 November	Man of the Match	Avishka Fernando	Galle Gladiators	Won by 8 runs	92* (63)	
30 November	Man of the Match	Thisara Perera	Dambulla Viiking	Won by 66 runs	97* (44)	
1 December	Man of the Match	Thisara Perera	Kandy Tuskers	Won by 54 runs	68 (28)	
3 December	Man of the Match	Avishka Fernando	Galle Gladiators	Won by 5 wickets	84 (59)	
14 December	Man of the Match	Johnson Charles	Dambulla Viiking	Won by 37 runs	76 (56)	
16 December	Man of the Match	Shoaib Malik	Galle Gladiators	Won by 53 runs	46 (35)	
