= Mario Villavarayan =

Sri Lankan cricketer

Personal information
- Full name: Mario Suresh Villavarayan
- Born: 22 August 1973 (age 53); Colombo, Western Province, Sri Lanka
- Nickname: Super Mario
- Batting: Right-handed
- Bowling: Right-arm fast-medium
- Role: Bowler

Career statistics
Competition	FC	LA
Matches	116	58
Runs scored	1580	199
Batting average	14.90	10.47
100s/50s	0/2	0/0
Top score	61	34*
Balls bowled	17603	2493
Wickets	378	71
Bowling average	22.38	24.35
5 wickets in innings	17	0
10 wickets in match	1	n/a
Best bowling	9/15	4/19
Catches/stumpings	59/0	8/0
- Source: Cricinfo, 13 August 2021

Mario Suresh Villavarayan also spelt as Mario Villavarayen (Tamil: மரியோ வில்லவராயன்; born 22 August 1973 in Colombo, Sri Lanka) is a former Sri Lankan cricketer of Tamil origin. He was a right-handed batsman and a right-arm fast-medium bowler. He played 116 first-class and 58 List A matches for various teams in Sri Lanka. He represented Sri Lanka at the 1998 Commonwealth Games, where cricket was included in the Commonwealth Games for the first time. He also worked as fitness trainer of Sri Lanka and Bangladesh men's national cricket teams for six years each. He also held the dual role as fast bowling coach and fitness trainer coach of defunct LPL team Jaffna Stallions. He is also renowned for raising his concerns over the need of national fitness policy in Sri Lanka.

== Career ==
He made his Sri Lanka 'A' side debut in 1994. During the 1996-97 domestic season, he took 9 for 15 in an innings in a first-class match for Bloomfield Cricket and Athletic Club against Police Sports Club.

Although he never played Test cricket or One Day International for Sri Lanka, he was selected to the Sri Lankan squad for the cricket tournament at the 1998 Commonwealth Games where Sri Lanka finished fourth in the competition.

He retired from cricket after the end of 2004-05 domestic season and his last List A match appearance came on 14 December 2004 when playing for Tamil Union Cricket and Athletic Club against Galle Cricket Club. He moved to Australia in order to pursue his coaching career. He then went onto play and coach Preston CC in Melbourne for two years. He also qualified as an Australian Level II coach and obtained bachelor's degree in Exercise Science. He also pursued a three-year degree in Sports Science in Australia.

He was roped in as the strength and conditioning coach by Sri Lanka Cricket in 2008 when he returned to Sri Lanka from Melbourne in that year. He served as the strength and conditioning coach of Sri Lankan team for six years until 2014 and also handled the Sri Lanka A and Development squads. In 2014, he was appointed as the strength and conditioning coach of Bangladesh cricket team replacing David Dwyer. Following the end of 2019 Cricket World Cup, his contract was extended by the Bangladesh Cricket Board for further two years.

However, in February 2020, he handed his resignation to BCB in order to join Sunrisers Hyderabad for the 2020 Indian Premier League. He was subsequently replaced by Nick Lee as the trainer of Bangladesh team. He was appointed as the fitness trainer of Sunrisers Hyderabad in 2020 for a three-year deal. He was also appointed as the fast bowling coach as well as fitness trainer for Jaffna Stallions in 2020 ahead of the inaugural edition of the Lanka Premier League which commenced in 2020.
