= 2020 Colombo Kings season =

Overview of Colombo Kings in 2020

Colombo Kings
2020 season
- Coach: Rangana Herath
- Captain: Angelo Mathews
- 2020 LPL: Semi-finalist
- Most runs: Laurie Evans (289)
- Most wickets: Qais Ahmad (12)

The Colombo Kings (abbreviated as CK) is a franchise Twenty20 cricket team based in Colombo, Western Province, Sri Lanka, that competed in the inaugural Lanka Premier League in 2020. The team is owned by Murfad Mustafa, an Indian businessman based in Dubai. For the season, the team was coached by Rangana Herath. Angelo Mathews served as captain, and was also announced as the icon player. Andre Russell, a Jamaican, was named as the marquee foreign player in the inaugural season. English batsman Laurie Evans made the most runs, while Afghan bowler Qais Ahmad took the most wickets for the Lanka's league.

The team was the most successful team of the season, winning six out of eight matches, though they lost in the semi-final against Galle Gladiators.

== Season summary ==
The Kings defeated the Kandy Tuskers in the league's inaugural match. The Tuskers scored 219/3 with the help of captain Kusal Mendis, who scored 87 runs off 52 balls. The Kings also scored 219 runs, which meant the game went to a super over. In the super over, the Tuskers scored 12/0 runs in reply to 16/1 runs by the Kings.

In Game 2, against the Galle Gladiators, the match was reduced to 5 overs per side because of rain. Andre Russell scored 65 runs off 19 balls to propel the Kings to 96 runs, while Galle could muster only 62 runs in response. The Kings' batting fluctuated in Game 3 as they were bowled out for just 149 runs in response to the 175 runs by Dambulla Viiking. With this loss, the Kings' unbeaten winning run came to an end.

In the Game 4, the team's bowlers restricted the Jaffna Stallions to 148/9. The Stallions' Wanindu Hasaranga scored 41 runs off 23 balls. The Kings chased the total down, winning the game by six wickets.

In Game 5, the Kings' Qais Ahmed picked up 2 wickets while also conceding eight runs from his four overs. The Kings bowled out the Tuskers for just 105 runs. In response, the Kings chased the total down inside of 15 overs to win the match by seven wickets. In Game 6, the Kings faced the Gladiators for the second time in the season. The Kings were bowled out for 175 runs, with Pakistani bowler Mohammed Amir taking a fifer. The Kings bowlers failed to defend their total, as they lost the game by eight wickets.

In Game 7 against the Stallions, the Colombo Kings batted first, with their opener Laurie Evans scoring 108 runs off 65 balls. This was also the LPL's first-ever century, and it helped lift the Kings to another win. In the last game of the group stage, Ahmed performed with both bat and ball. He first took 2-23 wickets from his four overs before hitting 50 runs off 22 balls. This gave the Kings another win, and they finished first on the table.

In the semi-final, the Kings opposed the Gladiators. They were impeccable with the bowling, the pace trio of Amir, Nuwan Thushara, and Dhananjaya Lakshan giving away just 80 runs in 12 overs, and picking up four wickets. However, with the batting, the Gladiators had enough opportunity to steal the win from Kings. When the game reached its final over, the Gladiators needed 15 off 6 balls. Lakshan struck two sixes, and Lakshan Sandakan later concluded the game by striking a four, giving the Kings the loss.

== Squad ==
- Players with international caps are listed in **bold**
- Ages given as of 26 November 2020, the date the first match was played in the tournament

| no. | Name | Nationality | Date of birth (age) | Batting style | Bowling style | Notes |
Batsmen
| 3 | **Ashan Priyanjan** | Sri Lanka | 14 August 1989 (aged 31) | Right-handed | Right-arm medium-fast | |
| 13 | **Faf du Plessis** | South Africa | 13 July 1984 (aged 36) | Right-handed | Right-arm leg-break | Overseas |
| N/A | **Ravinderpal Singh** | Canada | 14 October 1988 (aged 32) | Right-handed | — | Overseas |
| N/A | **Karim Sadiq** | Afghanistan | 28 February 1984 (aged 36) | Right-handed | Right-arm offbreak | Overseas |
| 27 | Lahiru Udara | Sri Lanka | 27 November 1993 (age 32) | Right-handed | — | |
| N/A | Navod Paranavithana | Sri Lanka | 16 May 2002 (age 24) | Left-handed | Left-arm slow-medium | |
| 32 | Laurie Evans | England | 12 October 1987 (age 38) | Right-handed | Right-arm medium-fast | Overseas |
| 23 | Daniel Bell-Drummond | England | 3 August 1993 (age 33) | Right-handed | Right-arm medium | Overseas |
All-rounders
| 69 | **Angelo Mathews** | Sri Lanka | 2 June 1987 (age 39) | Right-handed | Right-arm fast-medium | Captain, Icon player |
| 50 | **Isuru Udana** | Sri Lanka | 17 March 1988 (age 38) | Right-handed | Left-arm fast-medium | |
| 16 | **Thikshila de Silva** | Sri Lanka | 16 December 1993 (age 32) | Right-handed | Right-arm fast-medium | |
| 12 | **Andre Russell** | West Indies | 29 April 1988 (age 38) | Right-handed | Right-arm fast | Overseas marquee player |
| N/A | **Manpreet Gony** | India | 4 January 1984 (age 42) | Right-handed | Right-arm medium | Overseas |
| 8 | **Mohammad Hafeez** | Pakistan | 17 October 1980 (age 45) | Right-handed | Right-arm off break | Overseas |
| N/A | Himesh Ramanayake | Sri Lanka | 5 October 1997 (age 28) | Right-handed | Right-arm medium-fast | |
| N/A | Tharindu Ratnayake | Sri Lanka | 18 April 1996 (age 30) | Left-handed | Left-arm off-break | |
Wicket-keepers
| N/A | **Dinesh Chandimal** | Sri Lanka | 18 November 1989 (age 36) | Right-handed | Right-arm off break | |
| N/A | Manvinder Bisla | India | 27 December 1984 (age 41) | Right-handed | — | Overseas |
Bowlers
| 5 | **Dushmantha Chameera** | Sri Lanka | 11 January 1992 (age 34) | Right-handed | Right-arm fast | |
| 17 | **Amila Aponso** | Sri Lanka | 23 June 1993 (age 33) | Right-handed | Slow left-arm orthodox | |
| 46 | **Jeffrey Vandersay** | Sri Lanka | 5 February 1990 (age 36) | Right-handed | Right-arm leg break | |
| 34 | **Tharindu Kaushal** | Sri Lanka | 5 March 1993 (age 33) | Right-handed | Right-arm off break | |
| 30 | **Dhammika Prasad** | Sri Lanka | 30 May 1983 (age 43) | Right-handed | Right-arm fast-medium | |
| 50 | **Qais Ahmad** | Afghanistan | 15 August 2000 (age 26) | Right-handed | Right-arm leg-break | Overseas |
| N/A | Kalana Perera | Sri Lanka | 28 July 2000 (age 26) | Left-handed | Left-arm medium-fast | |

- Sources

== Teams and standings ==
=== Points table ===
| Pos | Team | Pld | W | L | NR | Pts | NRR |
|---|---|---|---|---|---|---|---|
| 1 | Colombo Kings | 8 | 6 | 2 | 0 | 12 | 0.448 |
| 2 | Dambulla Viiking | 8 | 5 | 2 | 1 | 11 | −0.087 |
| 3 | Jaffna Stallions (C) | 8 | 4 | 3 | 1 | 9 | 0.788 |
| 4 | Galle Gladiators (R) | 8 | 2 | 6 | 0 | 4 | −0.203 |
| 5 | Kandy Tuskers | 8 | 2 | 6 | 0 | 4 | −0.890 |

Source: ESPNCricinfo
- The top four teams qualified for the playoffs
- Advanced to semifinals

=== Matches ===
denotes the winning team. denotes the losing team.
| Date | Opponent | Toss | Result | Man of the match | Notes |
|---|---|---|---|---|---|
| 26 November | Kandy Tuskers | Colombo Kings elected to field. | Colombo Kings won by 5 runs. | Dinesh Chandimal | Won in super over. |
| 28 November | Galle Gladiators | Galle Gladiators elected to field. | Colombo Kings won by 34 runs. | Andre Russell | |
| 1 December | Dambulla Viiking | Dambulla Viiking elected to bat. | Dambulla Viiking won by 28 runs. | Dasun Shanaka | |
| 4 December | Jaffna Stallions | Colombo Kings elected to field. | Colombo Kings won by 6 wickets. | Dinesh Chandimal | |
| 5 December | Kandy Tuskers | Kandy Tuskers elected to bat. | Colombo Kings won by 7 wickets. | Dushmantha Chameera | |
| 7 December | Galle Gladiators | Colombo Kings elected to bat. | Galle Gladiators won by 8 wickets. | Mohammad Amir | |
| 10 December | Jaffna Stallions | Jaffna Stallions elected to field. | Colombo Kings won by 6 wickets. | Laurie Evans | |
| 11 December | Dambulla Viiking | Colombo Kings elected to field. | Colombo Kings won by 6 wickets. | Qais Ahmad | |
| 13 December | Galle Gladiators | Galle Gladiators elected to field. | Galle Gladiators won by 2 wickets. | Dhananjaya Lakshan | Lost the semi-final. |

== Statistics ==
=== Most runs ===
* indicates a player who remained not out.
| Batsman | Matches | Runs | Highest score |
|---|---|---|---|
| Laurie Evans | 8 | 289 | 108* |
| Dinesh Chandimal | 9 | 246 | 80 |
| Andre Russell | 8 | 169 | 65* |
| Daniel Bell-Drummond | 7 | 151 | 70 |
| Ashan Priyanjan | 9 | 102 | 47* |

=== Most wickets ===
Notation 3/24 denotes 3 wickets obtained by 24 runs.
| Bowler | Matches | Wickets | Best bowling |
|---|---|---|---|
| Qais Ahmad | 9 | 12 | 3/24 |
| Andre Russell | 8 | 8 | 3/18 |
| Dushmantha Chameera | 8 | 8 | 2/27 |
| Angelo Mathews | 9 | 5 | 1/9 |
| Ashan Priyanjan | 9 | 5 | 2/4 |

== Awards and achievements ==
| Date | Award | Player | Opponent | Result | Contribution | Ref. |
|---|---|---|---|---|---|---|
| 26 November | Man of the Match | Dinesh Chandimal | Kandy Tuskers | Won by 5 runs (Super over). | 80 (46) | |
| 28 November | Man of the Match | Andre Russell | Galle Gladiators | Won by 34 runs. | 65* (19) | |
| 4 December | Man of the Match | Dinesh Chandimal | Jaffna Stallions | Won by 6 wickets. | 68* (51) | |
| 5 December | Man of the Match | Dushmantha Chameera | Kandy Tuskers | Won by 7 wickets. | 1/17 | |
| 10 December | Man of the Match | Laurie Evans | Jaffna Stallions | Won by 6 runs. | 108*(65) | |
| 11 December | Man of the Match | Qais Ahmad | Dambulla Viiking | Won by 6 wickets. | 53* (24) | |
