= 2020 Kandy Tuskers season =

Overview of Kandy Tuskers in 2020

Kandy Tuskers
2020 season
- Official logo of Kandy Tuskers
- Coach: Hashan Tillakaratne
- Captain: Kusal Perera
- 2020 LPL: League stage (5th)
- Most runs: Kusal Mendis (263)
- Most wickets: Asela Gunaratne (9)

The Kandy Tuskers (abbreviated as KT) is a franchise cricket team which competed in inaugural season of Lanka Premier League in 2020. The team is based in Kandy, Central Province, Sri Lanka, and owned by Bollywood actor Sohail Khan. In the 2020 season, the team was under the captaincy of Kusal Perera and coached by Hashan Tillakaratne.

The team was eliminated in the inaugural season of the LPL after winning two out of eight matches. They were disqualified due to having a lower run rate than the qualifier, Galle Gladiators, which had the same winning streak.

== Season summary ==
In the inaugural match of the Lanka Premier League, the Colombo Kings beat the Tuskers in a super over. In their 20 overs, the Tuskers scored 219/3. This was largely due to their captain Kusal Mendis, who scored 87 runs off 52 balls. While in the super over, the Tuskers scored 12/0 in reply to 16/1 by the Kings. On 28 November 2020, the Tuskers lost their second successive match by four runs, this time to the Dambulla Viiking, as the DLS method was used due to rain.

In their third match, they defeated Galle Gladiators by 25 runs to log their first win of the season. They won despite 82 runs off 53 balls from the Gladiators opener Danushka Gunathilaka, as the Gladiators scored 171/7 in response to Kandy's 196/5. In their fourth game, the Tuskers were all out for 131 runs in response to the Jaffna Stallions' 185/8, losing the game by 54 runs.

In the Tuskers' fifth game of the season, against the Viiking, they got off to a good start. This was largely due to their captain Mendis, who scored 55 runs. However, the Tuskers still lost this game by five wickets. Yet again in their sixth game of the season, against the Colombo Kings, the Tuskers' batting failed them. Rahmanullah Gurbaz was the highest scorer for the Tuskers, scoring 34 runs off 21 balls. In response, the Kings reached their target inside 15 overs, winning by seven wickets and giving the Tuskers their third consecutive loss. This also sent the Kings into the semi-finals.

In their seventh game of the season, the Tuskers defeated the Jaffna Stallions by six runs. Their eighth match, against the Galle Gladiators, was a virtual quarter-final, with the winner advancing to the semi-final. The Tuskers' batting failed again, as the only batsman to pass 50 runs was their captain Mendis, who scored 68 runs of the Tuskers' total of 128 runs. The Tuskers bowlers could not replicate the Gladiators bowlers either, as they took only one wicket in the Gladiators' successful chase of 130/1. This meant that the Kandy Tuskers finished last on the inaugural Lanka Premier League table.

== Squad ==
- Players with international caps are listed in **bold**
- Ages given as of 26 November 2020, the date the first match was played in the tournament

| No. | Name | Nationality | Date of birth (age) | Batting style | Bowling style | Notes |
Batsmen
| 49 | **Priyamal Perera** | Sri Lanka | 3 May 1995 (aged 25) | Left-handed | — | |
| N/A | Nishan Madushka | Sri Lanka | 10 September 1999 (aged 21) | Right-handed | — | |
All-rounders
| 41 | **Seekkuge Prasanna** | Sri Lanka | 27 June 1985 (aged 35) | Right-handed | Right-arm legbreak | |
| 14 | **Asela Gunaratne** | Sri Lanka | 8 January 1986 (aged 34) | Right-handed | Right-arm medium | |
| 84 | **Kamindu Mendis** | Sri Lanka | 30 September 1998 (aged 22) | Left-handed | Right-arm offbreak, slow left-arm orthodox | |
| 47 | **Dilruwan Perera** | Sri Lanka | 12 July 1982 (aged 38) | Right-handed | Right arm off spin | |
| 333 | **Chris Gayle** | West Indies | 21 September 1979 (aged 41) | Left-handed | Right-arm offbreak | Overseas marquee player |
| N/A | **Irfan Pathan** | India | 27 October 1984 (aged 36) | Left-handed | Left-arm medium fast | Overseas |
| 33 | **Sohail Tanvir** | Pakistan | 12 December 1984 (aged 35) | Left-handed | Left-arm medium-fast | Overseas |
| 73 | Lahiru Samarakoon | Sri Lanka | 3 March 1997 (aged 23) | Left-handed | Right-arm fast-medium | |
| 11 | Ishan Jayaratne | Sri Lanka | 26 June 1989 (aged 31) | Right-handed | Right-arm fast-medium | |
Wicket-keepers
| 153 | **Kusal Perera** | Sri Lanka | 17 August 1990 (aged 30) | Left-handed | Left-arm medium | Captain, Icon player |
| 2 | **Kusal Mendis** | Sri Lanka | 2 February 1995 (aged 25) | Right-handed | Right-arm leg spin | |
| 100 | **Rahmanullah Gurbaz** | Afghanistan | 28 November 2001 (aged 18) | Right-handed | — | Overseas |
| 22 | **Brendan Taylor** | Zimbabwe | 6 February 1986 (aged 34) | Right-handed | Right-arm offbreak | Overseas |
Bowlers
| 63 | **Nuwan Pradeep** | Sri Lanka | 19 October 1986 (aged 34) | Right-handed | Right-arm fast | |
| 96 | **Lasith Embuldeniya** | Sri Lanka | 26 October 1996 (aged 24) | Left-handed | Slow left-arm orthodox | |
| 68 | **Vishwa Fernando** | Sri Lanka | 18 September 1991 (aged 29) | Right-handed | Left-arm fast-medium | |
| 17 | **Liam Plunkett** | England | 6 April 1985 (aged 35) | Right-handed | Right-arm fast | Overseas |
| 47 | **Wahab Riaz** | Pakistan | 28 June 1985 (aged 35) | Right-handed | Left-arm fast | Overseas |
| 88 | **Naveen-ul-Haq** | Afghanistan | 23 September 1999 (aged 21) | Right-handed | Right-arm medium-fast | Overseas |
| N/A | **Munaf Patel** | India | 12 July 1983 (aged 37) | Right-handed | Right-arm medium fast | Overseas |
| 8 | **Dale Steyn** | South Africa | 27 June 1983 (aged 37) | Right-handed | Right-arm fast | Overseas |
| N/A | Chamikara Edirisinghe | Sri Lanka | 4 April 1991 (aged 29) | Left-handed | Slow left-arm orthodox | |
| N/A | Kavishka Anjula | Sri Lanka | 23 September 1997 (aged 23) | Left-handed | Right-arm medium-fast | |
| 36 | Kevin Koththigoda | Sri Lanka | 4 October 1998 (aged 22) | Left-handed | Right-arm leg-break | |

- Sources

== Administration and support staff ==
The team is owned by the Bollywood actor Sohail Khan, the brother of Salman Khan. It is also co-owned by Abbas Muni. Hashan Tillakaratne was appointed as the head coach, while the team manager was Farveez Maharoof. Nuvan Kulasekara and Lanka De Silva were bowling and fielding coaches for the season, respectively.

== Season standings ==
=== League table ===
| Pos | Team | Pld | W | L | NR | Pts | NRR |
|---|---|---|---|---|---|---|---|
| 1 | Colombo Kings | 8 | 6 | 2 | 0 | 12 | 0.448 |
| 2 | Dambulla Viiking | 8 | 5 | 2 | 1 | 11 | −0.087 |
| 3 | Jaffna Stallions (C) | 8 | 4 | 3 | 1 | 9 | 0.788 |
| 4 | Galle Gladiators (R) | 8 | 2 | 6 | 0 | 4 | −0.203 |
| 5 | Kandy Tuskers | 8 | 2 | 6 | 0 | 4 | −0.890 |

Source: ESPNCricinfo
- The top four teams qualified for the playoffs
- Advanced to semifinals

=== Matches ===
denotes the winning teamdenotes the losing team
| Date | Opponent | Toss | Result | Player of the match | Notes |
|---|---|---|---|---|---|
| 26 November | Colombo Kings | Colombo Kings elected to field. | Colombo Kings won by 5 runs. | Dinesh Chandimal | Won in super over. |
| 28 November | Dambulla Viiking | Kandy Tuskers elected to field. | Dambulla Viiking won by 4 runs. | Dasun Shanaka | Won by DLS method. |
| 30 November | Galle Gladiators | Galle Gladiators elected to field. | Kandy Tuskers won by 25 runs. | Brendan Taylor | |
| 1 December | Jaffna Stallions | Jaffna Stallions elected to bat. | Jaffna Stallions won by 54 runs. | Thisara Perera | |
| 3 December | Dambulla Viiking | Kandy Tuskers elected to bat. | Dambulla Viiking won by 5 wickets. | Angelo Perera | |
| 5 December | Colombo Kings | Kandy Tuskers elected to bat. | Colombo Kings won by 7 wickets. | Dushmantha Chameera | |
| 9 December | Jaffna Stallions | Jaffna Stallions elected to bat. | Kandy Tuskers won by 6 wickets. | Asela Gunaratne | |
| 10 December | Galle Gladiators | Kandy Tuskers elected to field. | Galle Gladiators won by 9 wickets. | Danushka Gunathilaka | |

== Statistics ==
=== Most runs ===
The top scorer of Kandy Tuskers was Kusal Mendis, who scored 263 runs in eight matches, followed by the captain Kusal Perera, who scored 209 runs. The third and fourth position were attained by Rahmanullah Gurbaz and Asela Gunaratne.

* indicates a player who remained not out.
| Batsman | Matches | Runs | Highest score |
|---|---|---|---|
| Kusal Mendis | 8 | 263 | 68 |
| Kusal Perera | 8 | 209 | 87 |
| Rahmanullah Gurbaz | 8 | 169 | 53 |
| Asela Gunaratne | 8 | 168 | 52* |
| Brendan Taylor | 6 | 144 | 51* |

=== Most wickets ===
The most wickets were taken by Gunaratne, who took nine wickets in eight matches. He was followed by Afghan cricketer Naveen-ul-Haq, who took eight wickets. Vishwa Fernando and Seekkuge Prasanna both took three wickets, respectively.

Notation 2/20 denotes 2 wickets obtained by 20 runs.
| Bowler | Matches | Wickets | Best bowling |
|---|---|---|---|
| Asela Gunaratne | 8 | 9 | 2/20 |
| Naveen-ul-Haq | 5 | 8 | 3/44 |
| Nuwan Pradeep | 8 | 8 | 3/36 |
| Vishwa Fernando | 3 | 3 | 2/29 |
| Seekkuge Prasanna | 7 | 3 | 1/6 |

== Awards and achievements ==
| Date | Award | Player | Opponent | Result | Contribution | Ref. |
|---|---|---|---|---|---|---|
| 30 November | Man of the Match | Brendan Taylor | Galle Gladiators | Won by 25 runs. | 51* (35) | |
| 9 December | Man of the Match | Asela Gunaratne | Jaffna Stallions | Won by 6 wickets. | 52* (37) | |
