= Sebastianpillai =

Sebastianpillai is both a given name and a surname. Notable people with the name include:

- Sebastianpillai Vijeyaraj (born 1993), Sri Lankan cricketer
- Anton Sebastianpillai (1945–2020), British historian
