= 2020 Lanka Premier League final =

Final match of the LPL 2020

2020 Lanka Premier League Final
- Match programme cover
- Event: 2020 Lanka Premier League
Jaffna Stallions	Galle Gladiators
188/6	135/9
20 overs	20 overs
- Jaffna Stallions won by 53 runs
- Date: 16 December 2020
- Venue: Mahinda Rajapaksa International Cricket Stadium, Hambantota
- Player of the match: Shoaib Malik (Jaffna Stallions)
- Umpires: Kumar Dharmasena (Sri Lanka); Ruchira Palliyaguruge (Sri Lanka)

The 2020 Lanka Premier League Final was a Twenty20 cricket match played on 16 December 2020 at the Mahinda Rajapaksa International Cricket Stadium, Hambantota, Sri Lanka between Galle Gladiators and Jaffna Stallions to ascertain the winner of 2020 Lanka Premier League. Jaffna Stallions won the match against Galle Gladiators by 53 runs to be the Champions of inaugural LPL.

== Route to the final ==
Galle Gladiators			vs	Jaffna Stallions
League Stage
Opponent	Scorecard	Result	Titles	Opponent	Scorecard	Result
Jaffna Stallions	27 November 2020	Lost	Match 1	Galle Gladiators	27 November 2020	Won
Colombo Kings	28 November 2020	Lost	Match 2	Dambulla Viiking	30 November 2020	Won
Kandy Tuskers	30 November 2020	Lost	Match 3	Kandy Tuskers	01 December 2020	Won
Jaffna Stallions	03 December 2020	Lost	Match 4	Galle Gladiators	03 December 2020	Won
Dambulla Viiking	05 December 2020	Lost	Match 5	Colombo Kings	04 December 2020	Lost
Colombo Kings	07 December 2020	Won	Match 6	Dambulla Viiking	07 December 2020	No result
Dambulla Viiking	09 December 2020	Lost	Match 7	Kandy Tuskers	09 December 2020	Lost
Kandy Tuskers	10 December 2020	Won	Match 8	Colombo Kings	10 December 2020	Lost
Semi-finals
Semi-final 1				Semi-final 2
Opponent	Scorecard	Result	Titles	Opponent	Scorecard	Result
Colombo Kings	13 December 2020	Won	Match 15	Dambulla Viiking	14 December 2020	Won
2020 Lanka Premier League Final

During the group stage of the 2020 Lanka Premier League each team played eight matches, two against each of the other sides contesting the competition. The top four teams progressed to the playoff stage. Galle Gladiators concluded the league stage in fourth position with 4 points by winning two of their matches, losing six. Jaffna Stallions finished the league stage in third position with 9 points by winning four and losing three of their matches.

Galle Gladiators reached the final after defeating Colombo Kings by two wickets in the first semifinal. Jaffna Stallions qualified for the final after trouncing Dambulla Viiking by 37 runs in the second semifinal.

=== League stage matches ===
27 November 2020 (D/N)

Galle Gladiators; 175/8 (20 overs)	v	Jaffna Stallions; 176/2 (19.3 overs)

Jaffna Stallions won by 8 wickets
Mahinda Rajapaksa International Cricket Stadium, Hambantota

3 December 2020 (D/N)

Galle Gladiators; 170/6 (20 overs)	v	Jaffna Stallions; 174/5 (19.4 overs)

Jaffna Stallions won by 5 wickets
Mahinda Rajapaksa International Cricket Stadium, Hambantota

=== Playoff matches ===
==== Semifinal 1 ====
13 December 2020 (D/N)

Colombo Kings; 150/9 (20 overs)	v	Galle Gladiators; 151/8 (19.5 overs)

Galle Gladiators won by 2 wickets
Mahinda Rajapaksa International Cricket Stadium, Hambantota

==== Semifinal 2 ====
14 December 2020 (D/N)

Jaffna Stallions; 165/9 (20 overs)	v	Dambulla Viiking; 128 (19.1 overs)

Jaffna Stallions won by 37 runs
Mahinda Rajapaksa International Cricket Stadium, Hambantota

== Scorecard ==
Keys:

- (c) indicates team captain
- † indicates Wicket-keeper

- On-field umpires: Kumar Dharmasena (SL) and Ruchira Palliyaguruge (SL)
- Third umpire: Lyndon Hannibal (SL)
- Reserve umpire: Raveendra Wimalasiri (SL)
- Match referee: Ranjan Madugalle (SL)

Toss: Jaffna Stallions won the toss and elected to bat.

Result: Jaffna Stallions won by 53 runs

Jaffna Stallions innings
Player	Status	Runs	Balls	4s	6s	Strike rate
Avishka Fernando	c Shehan b Sahan	27	23	1	2	117.39
Johnson Charles (wk)	c Danushka b Lakshan	26	15	6	0	173.33
Charith Asalanka	c Danushka b Sandakan	10	9	2	0	111.11
Shoaib Malik	c Hazratullah b Lakshan	46	35	3	1	131.43
Dhananjaya de Silva	c Shehan b Lakshan	33	20	2	2	165.00
Thisara Perera (c)	not out	39	14	5	2	278.57
Wanindu Hasaranga	c Sahan b Amir	1	3	0	0	33.33
Chaturanga de Silva	not out	1	1	0	0	100.00
Suranga Lakmal	did not bat					
Usman Shinwari	did not bat					
Duanne Olivier	did not bat					
Extras 5 (wd 5); Total 188/6 (20 overs)				19	7	RR: 9.40

Fall of wickets: 1/44 (Charles, 4.4 ov), 2/66 (Charith, 7.2 ov), 3/70 (Avishka, 8.4 ov), 4/139 (Dhananjaya, 15.5 ov), 5/159 (Malik, 17.5 ov), 6/175 (Wanindu, 18.6 ov)

Galle Gladiators bowling
Bowler	Overs	Maidens	Runs	Wickets	Econ	Wides	NBs
Mohammad Amir	4	0	36	1	9.00	{{{wides}}}	{{{no-balls}}}
Nuwan Thushara	4	0	39	0	9.75	{{{wides}}}	{{{no-balls}}}
Dhananjaya Lakshan	4	0	36	3	9.00	{{{wides}}}	{{{no-balls}}}
Sahan Arachchige	4	0	36	1	9.00	{{{wides}}}	{{{no-balls}}}
Lakshan Sandakan	4	0	41	1	10.25	{{{wides}}}	{{{no-balls}}}

Target: 189 runs from 20 overs at 9.45 RR

Galle Gladiators innings
Player	Status	Runs	Balls	4s	6s	Strike rate
Danushka Gunathilaka	run out (Thisara)	1	2	0	0	50.00
Hazratullah Zazai	c Avishka b Dhananjaya	0	2	0	0	0.00
Ahsan Ali	c †Charles b Lakmal	6	6	1	0	100.00
Bhanuka Rajapaksa (c)	c Shinwari b Malik	40	17	3	4	235.29
Shehan Jayasuriya	c Malik b Shinwari	15	25	0	1	60.00
Azam Khan (wk)	c Charith b Olivier	36	17	1	4	211.76
Dhananjaya Lakshan	c †Charles b Shinwari	9	9	2	0	100.00
Sahan Arachchige	c Wanindu b Malik	17	18	2	0	94.44
Mohammad Amir	c Dhananjaya b Wanindu	0	1	0	0	0.00
Lakshan Sandakan	not out	9	24	0	0	37.50
Nuwan Thushara	not out	0	0	0	0	0
Extras 2 (nb 1, wd 1); Total 135/9 (20 overs)				9	9	RR: 9.40

Fall of wickets: 1/1 (Hazratullah, 0.3 ov), 2/3 (Danushka, 1.2 ov), 3/7 (Ahsan, 1.4 ov), 4/62 (Bhanuka, 8.2 ov), 5/76 (Shehan, 9.5 ov), 6/93 (Lakshan, 11.6 ov), 7/110 (Azam, 13.5 ov), 8/114 (Amir, 14.1 ov), 9/130 (Sahan, 17.3 ov)

Jaffna Stallions bowling
Bowler	Overs	Maidens	Runs	Wickets	Econ	Wides	NBs
Dhananjaya de Silva	4	0	31	1	7.75	{{{wides}}}	{{{no-balls}}}
Suranga Lakmal	3	0	12	1	4.00	{{{wides}}}	{{{no-balls}}}
Thisara Perera	1	0	15	0	15.00	{{{wides}}}	{{{no-balls}}}
Shoaib Malik	3	0	13	2	4.33	{{{wides}}}	{{{no-balls}}}
Usman Shinwari	2	0	20	2	10.00	{{{wides}}}	{{{no-balls}}}
Wanindu Hasaranga	4	0	18	1	4.50	{{{wides}}}	{{{no-balls}}}
Duanne Olivier	2	0	25	1	12.50	{{{wides}}}	{{{no-balls}}}
Chaturanga de Silva	1	0	1	0	1.00	{{{wides}}}	{{{no-balls}}}

== See also ==
- Lanka Premier League
- 2020 Lanka Premier League
