= Danushka Gunathilaka =

Sri Lankan cricketer

Personal information
- Full name: Mestiyage Don Danishka Gunathilaka
- Born: 17 March 1991 (age 35); Panadura, Sri Lanka
- Nickname: Danny, Danny Sir, Nuwara Hamu,
- Batting: Left-handed
- Bowling: Right-arm off break
- Role: All-rounder

International information
- National side: Sri Lanka (2015–2022)
- Test debut (cap 132): 26 July 2017 v India
- Last Test: 30 December 2018 v New Zealand
- ODI debut (cap 170): 1 November 2015 v West Indies
- Last ODI: 24 June 2022 v Australia
- T20I debut (cap 66): 7 January 2016 v New Zealand
- Last T20I: 16 October 2022 v Namibia

Career statistics
Competition	Test	ODI	T20I	FC
Matches	8	47	46	56
Runs scored	299	1601	741	2495
Batting average	18.68	35.57	16.46	28.03
100s/50s	0/2	2/11	0/3	3/20
Top score	61	133	57	152
Catches/stumpings	6/–	14/–	21/–	62/–
- Source: ESPNCricinfo

Mestiyage Don Danishka Gunathilaka, commonly known as Danushka Gunathilaka, (born 17 March 1991) is a professional Sri Lankan cricketer who has played for Sri Lanka as a top-order batter in all formats of the game. He has been occasionally sidelined due to disciplinary issues.

== Biography ==
Gunathilaka was born in Panadura and studied at Mahanama College, Colombo.

== Early and domestic career ==
Gunathilaka made his cricketing debut in the 2007–08 Inter-Provincial Twenty20 tournament for Sri Lanka Schools, alongside fellow Colts Cricket Club player Kusal Perera.

Gunathilaka made his List A debut for Colombo Cricket Club against Sinhalese Sports Club in 2009–10, scoring a single run. He also played school cricket representing Mahanama College. He also played for Sri Lanka national under-19 cricket team at the 2010 Under-19 Cricket World Cup.

He also played for Sri Lanka national under-19 cricket team at the 2010 Under-19 Cricket World Cup. In March 2018, he was named in Kandy's squad for the 2017–18 Super Four Provincial Tournament. The following month, he was also named in Kandy's squad for the 2018 Super Provincial One Day Tournament. In August 2018, he was named in Dambulla's squad the 2018 SLC T20 League. In March 2019, he was named in Dambulla's squad for the 2019 Super Provincial One Day Tournament.

== Franchise career ==
In October 2020, he was drafted by the Galle Gladiators for the inaugural edition of the Lanka Premier League. He also ended up the inaugural edition of the Lanka Premier League in 2020 as the leading runscorer of the tournament with 476 runs in 10 matches and singlehandedly carried the Galle Gladiators franchise to the tournament final. His performance in the tournament was also praised by veteran Pakistani allrounder and Galle Gladiators captain Shahid Afridi who called Gunathilaka as potentially the next Kumar Sangakkara of Sri Lanka. His bizarre runout after colliding with Suranga Lakmal in the 2020 LPL final against Jaffna Stallions drew social media attention and sympathy towards him. After his performances at the 2020 My11Circle Lanka Premier League, he was named in the LPL team of the tournament.

In November 2021, he was selected to play for the Galle Gladiators following the players' draft for the 2021 Lanka Premier League. In July 2022, he was signed by the Galle Gladiators for the third edition of the Lanka Premier League.

== International career ==
He made his One Day International debut for Sri Lanka against the West Indies on 1 November 2015. He was selected for home ODI series against West Indies in 2015 after a string of impressive performances with the Sri Lankan A team in the tour of New Zealand in the same year scoring two fifties in four innings.

After Kusal Perera dropped from the 2015–16 New Zealand tour due to a drug scandal, Gunathilaka was included in the ODI squad for the opening position with Tillakaratne Dilshan. His batting ability did not show in the first two ODIs, but in the third ODI, which was his only 4th international match, Gunathilaka scored a fast and dashing 65 runs from 45 balls. The innings included 7 fours and 4 sixes and getting the match away from New Zealand. Sri Lanka won the match by 8 wickets and Gunathilaka was adjudged man of the match for his performance. During the same tour, he made his Twenty20 International debut for Sri Lanka against New Zealand on 7 January 2016.

Gunathilaka was not initially announced to the Sri Lanka squad for 2017 ICC Champions Trophy. But he was called for the squad for injured Chamara Kapugedera. He scored 77 runs against India, guiding the team to victory. Sri Lanka chased 321 at the end, recording the highest chase ever in Champions Trophy history. During the run chase, he put on a 159 run stand with Kusal Mendis for the second wicket.

Gunathilaka scored his maiden ODI century on 6 July 2017 against Zimbabwe at MRIC Stadium. He along with Niroshan Dickwella added a 229-run partnership for the first wicket, where Dickwella also scored his maiden ODI century. Sri Lanka chased 310 to win the match, which is recorded as the first 300+ chase by Sri Lanka on home soil as well. Gunathilaka won the man of the match award for his impressive batting performance.

In the fourth ODI against Zimbabwe, he and Niroshan Dickwella set the record for becoming the first pair of batsmen to score two successive 200-plus partnerships in ODIs. He missed out on his consecutive century, dismissed for 87 runs, whereas his counterpart Dickwella scored his second consecutive century.

He made his Test debut for Sri Lanka against India on 26 July 2017. He only scored 18 runs in the match, and took the sole wicket of Abhinav Mukund. Sri Lanka finally lost the match by huge 304 runs.

In May 2018, he was one of 33 cricketers to be awarded a national contract by Sri Lanka Cricket (SLC) ahead of the 2018–19 season. However, in July 2018, SLC suspended him from all forms of international cricket, after he breached the code of conduct. Despite his disciplinary issues, he helped Sri Lanka to have a firm opening stand in the second test against South Africa, where Gunathilaka along with Dimuth Karunaratne put on a century partnership in the first innings and a 91-run partnership in the second innings. Gunathilaka scored two fifties in the match and Sri Lanka won the match by 199 runs to seal the series 2–0. He was ruled out from the Sri Lankan team prior to the start of the 2018 Asia Cup due to suffering an injury in the training session and was replaced by Shehan Jayasuriya.

On 2 October 2019, Gunathilaka scored his second ODI century during the second ODI against Pakistan in Karachi. During the first T20I, Gunathilaka scored his second T20I fifty. He along with Avishka Fernando had an opening partnership of 84 runs, which laid the foundation for 165 runs. Pakistan bowled out for 101 runs and Sri Lanka won the match by 64 runs, which is the highest winning margin against them in all T20Is. Gunathilaka won the man of the match award for his all-round performance.

On 10 March 2021, in the first match against the West Indies, Gunathilaka became the first cricketer for Sri Lanka to be given out obstructing the field in ODIs. However, West Indies captain Kieron Pollard later apologised to Gunathilaka after his error in the game. However, during the ODI series, he was the top scorer for Sri Lanka with the scores of 55, 96 and 36. Even though his impressive opening stand, Sri Lanka lost the series 3–0.

Due to a hamstring injury, Gunathilaka was forced to withdraw from the 2022 T20 World Cup in the opening round. He was replaced in the lineup by Ashen Bandara, but stayed in Australia with the team. Sri Lanka Cricket (SLC) also came under immense scrutiny and widespread criticism for retaining him with the team squad rather than sending him back to Sri Lanka and SLC was accused of showing partiality and favourable treatment to him over others.

== Sexual assault charge ==
In November 2022, during the T20 World Cup in Australia, police charged Gunathilaka with four counts of sexual intercourse without consent following an alleged sexual assault in Sydney's east. The charges came after a police investigation into claims that a 29-year-old woman had been sexually assaulted at a home in Rose Bay. Gunathilaka was apprehended early on 6 November 2022 at the team hotel in Sydney. According to the NSW police, on the evening of 2 November, Gunathilaka allegedly assaulted the woman at her home after she met him at a bar. He had communicated with her for a number of days via an online dating app.

Gunathilaka was initially refused bail as it was thought he posed a flight risk, and was held in custody at Parklea Correctional Centre for 11 days. On 17 November he was granted bail of $A150,000 subject to a number of conditions: reporting to police daily, a curfew from 9 pm to 6 am, not contacting the complainant and a ban on accessing dating applications. Gunathilaka is also suspended by SLC from playing all forms of cricket. In Downing Centre Local Court, a magistrate adjourned the matter until 23 February 2023, so a police brief of evidence could be finalised. On 18 May 2023, three of the four charges were dropped by the prosecution.

Gunathilaka's judge-only trial, for one count of sexual intercourse without consent, began on 18 September 2023. It was alleged that Gunathilaka removed his condom by stealth during sexual intercourse. On 28 September he was found not guilty by Justice Sarah Huggett.

== Disciplinary issues ==
On 5 October 2017, Gunathilaka was suspended for six limited over international matches and also omitted from the Sri Lanka ODI squad for Pakistan in the UAE. This suspension was given by Sri Lanka Cricket due to missing training sessions, turning up to a match without his gear, and showing an indifferent attitude during training. However, the suspension was reduced to three matches on 17 October 2017 after a meeting of Sri Lanka Cricket's executive committee in Colombo. Gunathilaka was also fined 20% of his annual contract fee.

In January 2018, ICC officially reprimanded Gunathilaka for breaching Level 1 of the ICC Code of Conduct when he gave send off to Bangladeshi batsman Tamim Iqbal when he was dismissed during the final of the ODI Tri Nation Series between Sri Lanka and Bangladesh.

On 22 July 2018, Gunathilaka was again suspended from international cricket by Sri Lanka Cricket for breaching the "Player Code of Conduct" by breaking the team curfew. His suspension came immediately after the end of the second test against South Africa. Gunathilaka was fined his entire match fee from the second test and was suspended for six matches. The first three matches of the six-match suspension are for his current breach of the code of conduct, whereas the other three matches about October 2017 incidence. The reason for the suspension from international cricket was due to the fact that one of the friends of Gunathilaka was accused of raping a Norwegian woman in a hotel room at Colombo and Gunathilaka was inquired by the Sri Lanka Police regarding the matter. The Sri Lankan Police later revealed that Gunathilaka was innocent and cleared him from allegations of rape and sexual assault.

In March 2021, the International Cricket Council reprimanded Gunathilaka for breaching Level 1 of the ICC Code of Conduct for using offensive, indecent and inappropriate language towards West Indies batsman Nicholas Pooran after dismissing him during the 35th over of the West Indies innings in the third ODI between Sri Lanka and West Indies.

On 28 April 2021, Sri Lanka Cricket (SLC) censured Gunathilaka for his indecent behaviour regarding reports claiming that he had a brawl with a few others during an event at a hotel in Matara, with a three-member inquiry panel finding his conduct unprofessional and lacking integrity. He was directed to attend mandatory counselling sessions for a year instead of handing over another ban from cricket. SLC in a media release said, "…based on the findings and recommendations made by the panel, the Management Committee of Sri Lanka Cricket warned the player not to engage in any conduct which violates the standards of honesty, morality, fair play, and sportsmanship which result in bringing disrepute to Sri Lanka Cricket."The three-member Inquiry Panel headed by an Independent Attorney-at-Law has found the players' conduct with regard to the alleged incident to be unprofessional and lacking the required level of integrity expected of a National Player." "The committee also directed Gunathilaka to attend mandatory counselling sessions conducted by a doctor nominated by Sri Lanka Cricket for a 1 year period," the statement also read. However, Gunathilaka refused the allegations and had initially asked SLC to intervene into the false allegations leveled against him.

On 28 June 2021, Sri Lanka Cricket (SLC) suspended Gunathilaka, Kusal Mendis and Niroshan Dickwella after they breached the team's bio-secure bubble during Sri Lanka's tour of England. All three players were seen in the city centre of Durham, with SLC sending them all back home ahead of the ODI matches. In July 2021, following the outcome of the incident, Gunathilaka was suspended from playing in international cricket for one year. Sri Lanka Cricket agreed to lift the ban early, rescinding the punishment in January 2022.
