= Pulina Tharanga =

Sri Lankan cricketer

Personal information
- Full name: Desenthuwa Handi Ashan Pulina Tharanga
- Born: 23 January 1993 (age 33); Galle, Sri Lanka

International information
- National side: Sri Lanka
- Source: ESPNcricinfo, 30 August 2021

Pulina Tharanga (born 23 January 1993) is a Sri Lankan cricketer.

== Biography ==
He became a victim of the 2004 Indian Ocean earthquake and tsunami as he lost both his parents during the disaster at the age of 11. He was later brought up in Foundation of Goodness, a charity organisation which is located at Seenigama near Hikkaduwa. He also received a scholarship program from Marylebone Cricket Club, after joining the Foundation of Goodness.

== Career ==
He made his first-class debut for Singha Sports Club in the 2010–11 Premier Trophy on 1 April 2011. He was named in Sri Lankan U-19 squad for the 2012 Under-19 Cricket World Cup. In October 2020, he was drafted by the Dambulla Viiking for the inaugural edition of the Lanka Premier League.

In August 2021, he was named in the SLC Greys team for the 2021 SLC Invitational T20 League tournament. Following his strong performance in the tournament, he was named in Sri Lanka's One Day International (ODI) and Twenty20 International (T20I) squads for their series against South Africa. The following month, Tharanga was named as one of four reserve players in Sri Lanka's squad for the 2021 ICC Men's T20 World Cup. In November 2021, he was selected to play for the Galle Gladiators following the players' draft for the 2021 Lanka Premier League.

In January 2022, he was named as one of six reserve players in Sri Lanka's One Day International (ODI) squad for their series against Zimbabwe. In June 2022, he was named in the Sri Lanka A squad for their matches against Australia A during Australia's tour of Sri Lanka.

In July 2022, he was signed by the Galle Gladiators for the third edition of the Lanka Premier League.
