= 2020 Lanka Premier League =

Inaugural edition of Lanka Premier League

- Dates: 26 November – 16 December 2020
- Administrator: Sri Lanka Cricket
- Cricket format: Twenty20
- Tournament format(s): Double Round-robin and Knockout
- Host: Sri Lanka
- Champions: Jaffna Stallions (1st title)
- Runners-up: Galle Gladiators
- Participants: 5
- Matches: 23
- Player of the series: Wanindu Hasaranga (Jaffna Stallions)
- Most runs: Danushka Gunathilaka (Galle Gladiators) (476)
- Most wickets: Wanindu Hasaranga (Jaffna Stallions) (17)
- Official website: lplt20sl.com

The 2020 Lanka Premier League, also known as My11Circle LPL T20, for sponsorship reasons, was the inaugural edition of the Lanka Premier League (LPL) Twenty20 franchise cricket tournament in Sri Lanka. Five teams based on various Sri Lankan cities played a total of 23 matches. It was originally scheduled to start in August but was rescheduled several times due to restrictions for the COVID-19 pandemic.

On 5 November, the tournament was given the green light to go ahead, with all the matches being played at the MRIC Stadium in Hambantota, from 26 November to 16 December 2020. The opening ceremony took place before the first match. In November 2020, Indian fantasy cricket league platform My11Circle was named the title sponsor with a bid of Rs 150M (15 crore) for the tournament.

Jaffna Stallions won by 53 runs against Galle Gladiators in the final and became the inaugural Champions of LPL.

== Squads ==
The player draft was scheduled to be held on 1 October 2020. It was later rescheduled to 9 October 2020 to ensure the players had adequate time to meet the Sri Lankan government's quarantine requirements. The draft was again rescheduled for a second time to 19 October 2020 due to the sudden spike in COVID-19 cases in the country. The squads were announced at the draft via Zoom.

Colombo Kings	Dambulla Viiking	Galle Gladiators	Jaffna Stallions	Kandy Tuskers
Angelo Mathews (c); Andre Russell; ~~Faf du Plessis~~; Manpreet Gony; ~~Manvinder Bisla~~; Isuru Udana; Dinesh Chandimal; Amila Aponso; ~~Ravinderpal Singh~~; Ashan Priyanjan; Dushmantha Chameera; Jeffrey Vandersay; Thikshila de Silva; Tharindu Kaushal; Lahiru Udara; Himesh Ramanayake; Kalana Perera; Tharindu Ratnayake; Navod Paranavithana; Qais Ahmad; ~~Mohammad Hafeez~~; Laurie Evans; Daniel Bell-Drummond; Karim Sadiq; Dhammika Prasad	Dasun Shanaka (c); ~~David Miller~~; ~~Carlos Brathwaite~~; Samit Patel; Niroshan Dickwella; Lahiru Kumara; Oshada Fernando; Kasun Rajitha; Paul Stirling; Lahiru Madushanka; Upul Tharanga; Angelo Perera; Ramesh Mendis; Pulina Tharanga; Ashen Bandara; Dilshan Madushanka; Kavindu Nadeeshan; Sachindu Colombage; ~~Lendl Simmons~~; Sudeep Tyagi; ~~Kamran Akmal~~; Aftab Alam; ~~Sohaib Maqsood~~; Anwar Ali; Malinda Pushpakumara; Samiullah Shinwari; Sadeera Samarawickrama	Bhanuka Rajapaksa (c); Shahid Afridi; Danushka Gunathilaka; ~~Lasith Malinga~~; ~~Colin Ingram~~; Hazratullah Zazai; Mohammad Amir; Akila Dananjaya; Milinda Siriwardana; ~~Sarfaraz Ahmed~~; Azam Khan; Lakshan Sandakan; Shehan Jayasuriya; Asitha Fernando; Nuwan Thushara; Mohamed Shiraz; Dhananjaya Lakshan; Chanaka Ruwansiri; Sahan Arachchige; Duvindu Tillakaratne; Chadwick Walton; Ahsan Ali; Waqas Maqsood; Abdul Nasir	Thisara Perera (c); ~~Dawid Malan~~; Wanindu Hasaranga; Shoaib Malik; Usman Shinwari; Avishka Fernando; Dhananjaya de Silva; Suranga Lakmal; Binura Fernando; ~~Asif Ali~~; Minod Bhanuka; Chaturanga de Silva; Maheesh Theekshana; Charith Asalanka; Nuwanidu Fernando; Kanagarathinam Kabilraj; Theivendiram Dinoshan; Vijayakanth Viyaskanth; Kyle Abbott; Duanne Olivier; ~~Ravi Bopara~~; Tom Moores; Prabath Jayasuriya; Johnson Charles; Sebastianpillai Vijeyaraj; Mehmood Khan	Kusal Perera (c); ~~Chris Gayle~~; ~~Liam Plunkett~~; ~~Wahab Riaz~~; Kusal Mendis; Nuwan Pradeep; Seekkuge Prasanna; Asela Gunaratne; Naveen-ul-Haq; Kamindu Mendis; Dilruwan Perera; Priyamal Perera; Kavishka Anjula; Lasith Embuldeniya; Lahiru Samarakoon; Nishan Madushka; Chamikara Edirisinghe; Ishan Jayaratne; Irfan Pathan; Rahmanullah Gurbaz; ~~Sohail Tanvir~~; Munaf Patel; Brendan Taylor; Dale Steyn; Vishwa Fernando; Kevin Koththigoda

South African players Faf du Plessis and David Miller alongside Englishman Dawid Malan pulled out of the tournament as they were named in the limited overs squads for the series between English and South Africa in November 2020. Pakistani players Mohammad Hafeez, Sarfaraz Ahmed and Wahab Riaz pulled out of the tournament as they were named in the 35 member Pakistan squad for the series against New Zealand in December 2020. Colin Ingram pulled out of the tournament due to his Big Bash League stint with Hobart Hurricanes while Carlos Brathwaite also withdrew from the tournament after being signed by the Sydney Sixers for the upcoming 2020-21 Big Bash League season.

Lendl Simmons replaced Carlos Brathwaite in the Dambulla Viiking team while Brendan Taylor and Johnson Charles who were initially not picked by any franchises in the draft were signed by the Dambulla Viiking to complete the six foreign players slot. Jaffna Stallions signed Kyle Abbott, Duanne Olivier and Tom Moores who were not initially part of the draft while Ravi Bopara replaced Asif Ali in Jaffna Stallions to complete its six foreign player slot. Former Indian cricketer Irfan Pathan who was not initially picked by any franchises in the draft was later signed by the Kandy Tuskers.

Manvinder Bisla who was picked by Colombo Kings in the draft had later pulled out of the tournament owing to the strict 14-day quarantine procedure to foreign players. Chris Gayle pulled out of the tournament due to a side strain and also due to failing to negotiate the contract terms with the Kandy Tuskers franchise. Lasith Malinga also withdrew citing fitness issues and lack of match practice. Ravi Bopara who was later drafted into the Jaffna Stallions squad also pulled out citing payment issues.

Canadian batsman Ravinderpal Singh was tested positive for COVID-19 after arriving at the Colombo airport. Andre Russell who also arrived with him in the same flight was kept under self-isolation. He was immediately taken to the hospital and reports yet to emerge whether he would be replaced by another player. More replacements were later announced on 20 November 2020. Sohail Tanvir who was set to play for Kandy Tuskers was replaced by Dale Steyn after testing positive for COVID-19. In later reports, it was revealed that one Pakistani player, one Indian player and one Indian television production technician whose names were not disclosed have been tested positive for COVID-19.

== Venues ==
Initially, matches were scheduled to be held in Kandy, Dambulla and Hambantota. The possibility of moving the tournament to either Malaysia or the United Arab Emirates was once considered to circumvent the 14-day quarantine. In the end, health officials agreed to reducing the quarantine period for foreign players from 14 days to 7 days. Following the urge from health officials, all 23 matches would be held in Hambantota.

Hambantota
Mahinda Rajapaksa International Cricket Stadium

Capacity: 35,000
Matches: 23

== Teams and standings ==
=== Points table ===
Pos	Team	Pld	W	L	NR	Pts	NRR
1	Colombo Kings	8	6	2	0	12	0.448
2	Dambulla Viiking	8	5	2	1	11	−0.087
3	Jaffna Stallions (C)	8	4	3	1	9	0.788
4	Galle Gladiators (R)	8	2	6	0	4	−0.203
5	Kandy Tuskers	8	2	6	0	4	−0.890

Source: ESPNCricinfo
- The top four teams qualified for the playoffs
- Advanced to semifinals

=== Match summary ===
Team	Group matches								Playoffs		
Team	1	2	3	4	5	6	7	8	SF1	SF2	F
Colombo Kings	2	4	4	6	8	8	10	12	L		
Dambulla Viiking	2	2	4	6	8	9	11	11		L	
Galle Gladiators	0	0	0	0	0	2	2	4	W		L
Jaffna Stallions	2	4	6	8	8	9	9	9		W	W
Kandy Tuskers	0	0	2	2	2	2	4	4			

Win	Loss	No result

Note: The total points at the end of each group match are listed.
Note: Click on the points (group matches) or W/L (playoffs) to see the match summary.

== League stage ==
Match 1
26 November 2020
20:00 (N)
Scorecard

Kandy Tuskers; 219/3 (20 overs)	v	Colombo Kings; 219/7 (20 overs)
Kusal Perera 87 (52); Qais Ahmad 1/28 (3 overs)		Dinesh Chandimal 80 (46); Nuwan Pradeep 2/34 (4 overs)

Match tied
(Colombo Kings won the Super Over)
Mahinda Rajapaksa International Cricket Stadium, Hambantota
Umpires: Lyndon Hannibal and Raveendra Wimalasiri
Player of the match: Dinesh Chandimal (Colombo Kings)

- Colombo Kings won the toss and elected to field.
- Super Over: Colombo Kings 16/1, Kandy Tuskers 12/0

Match 2
27 November 2020
20:00 (N)
Scorecard

Galle Gladiators; 175/8 (20 overs)	v	Jaffna Stallions; 176/2 (19.3 overs)
Shahid Afridi 58 (23); Duanne Olivier 4/44 (4 overs)		Avishka Fernando 92* (63); Mohammad Amir 1/29 (4 overs)

Jaffna Stallions won by 8 wickets
Mahinda Rajapaksa International Cricket Stadium, Hambantota
Umpires: Deepal Gunawardene and Lyndon Hannibal
Player of the match: Avishka Fernando (Jaffna Stallions)

- Galle Gladiators won the toss and elected to bat.

Match 3
28 November 2020
15:30 (D/N)
Scorecard

Dambulla Viiking; 195/4 (20 overs)	v	Kandy Tuskers; 84/3 (9.4 overs)
Dasun Shanaka 73 (37); Asela Gunaratne 2/20 (3 overs)		Kusal Mendis 34* (26); Lahiru Madushanka 1/4 (1 over)

Dambulla Viiking won by 4 runs (DLS method)
Mahinda Rajapaksa International Cricket Stadium, Hambantota
Umpires: Hemantha Boteju and Raveendra Wimalasiri
Player of the match: Dasun Shanaka (Dambulla Viiking)

- Kandy Tuskers won the toss and elected to field.
- Kandy Tuskers were set a revised target of 89 runs from 9.4 overs due to rain.

Match 4
28 November 2020
20:00 (N)
Scorecard

Colombo Kings; 96/1 (5 overs)	v	Galle Gladiators; 62/2 (5 overs)
Andre Russell 65* (19); Asitha Fernando 1/26 (1 over)		Danushka Gunathilaka 30* (15); Ashan Priyanjan 1/1 (1 over)

Colombo Kings won by 34 runs
Mahinda Rajapaksa International Cricket Stadium, Hambantota
Umpires: Rohitha Kottahachchi and Prageeth Rambukwella
Player of the match: Andre Russell (Colombo Kings)

- Galle Gladiators won the toss and elected to field.
- The match was reduced to 5 overs per side due to rain.

Match 5
30 November 2020
15:30 (D/N)
Scorecard

Jaffna Stallions; 218/7 (20 overs)	v	Dambulla Viiking; 152 (19.1 overs)
Thisara Perera 97* (44); Samit Patel 2/26 (3 overs)		Samit Patel 41 (22); Usman Shinwari 3/16 (4 overs)

Jaffna Stallions won by 66 runs
Mahinda Rajapaksa International Cricket Stadium, Hambantota
Umpires: Keerthi Bandara and Raveendra Wimalasiri
Player of the match: Thisara Perera (Jaffna Stallions)

- Dambulla Viiking won the toss and elected to field.

Match 6
30 November 2020
20:00 (N)
Scorecard

Kandy Tuskers; 196/5 (20 overs)	v	Galle Gladiators; 171/7 (20 overs)
Brendan Taylor 51* (35); Lakshan Sandakan 2/41 (4 overs)		Danushka Gunathilaka 82 (53); Seekkuge Prasanna 1/12 (1 over)

Kandy Tuskers won by 25 runs
Mahinda Rajapaksa International Cricket Stadium, Hambantota
Umpires: Lyndon Hannibal and Ravindra Kottahachchi
Player of the match: Brendan Taylor (Kandy Tuskers)

- Galle Gladiators won the toss and elected to field.

Match 7
1 December 2020
15:30 (D/N)
Scorecard

Dambulla Viiking; 175/9 (20 overs)	v	Colombo Kings; 147 (18.4 overs)
Dasun Shanaka 56 (34); Andre Russell 3/18 (2 overs)		Laurie Evans 59 (33); Anwar Ali 2/10 (1.4 overs)

Dambulla Viiking won by 28 runs
Mahinda Rajapaksa International Cricket Stadium, Hambantota
Umpires: Deepal Gunawardene and Ruchira Palliyaguruge
Player of the match: Dasun Shanaka (Dambulla Viiking)

- Dambulla Viiking won the toss and elected to bat.

Match 8
1 December 2020
20:00 (N)
Scorecard

Jaffna Stallions; 185/8 (20 overs)	v	Kandy Tuskers; 131 (17.1 overs)
Thisara Perera 68 (28); Naveen-ul-Haq 3/44 (4 overs)		Brendan Taylor 46 (32); Usman Shinwari 3/17 (3 overs)

Jaffna Stallions won by 54 runs
Mahinda Rajapaksa International Cricket Stadium, Hambantota
Umpires: Asanga Jayasooriya and Prageeth Rambukwella
Player of the match: Thisara Perera (Jaffna Stallions)

- Jaffna Stallions won the toss and elected to bat.

Match 9
3 December 2020
15:30 (D/N)
Scorecard

Galle Gladiators; 170/6 (20 overs)	v	Jaffna Stallions; 174/5 (19.4 overs)
Danushka Gunathilaka 56 (44); Wanindu Hasaranga 2/29 (4 overs)		Avishka Fernando 84 (59); Asitha Fernando 2/30 (4 overs)

Jaffna Stallions won by 5 wickets
Mahinda Rajapaksa International Cricket Stadium, Hambantota
Umpires: Hemantha Boteju and Ruchira Palliyaguruge
Player of the match: Avishka Fernando (Jaffna Stallions)

- Galle Gladiators won the toss and elected to bat.

Match 10
3 December 2020
20:00 (N)
Scorecard

Kandy Tuskers; 156/6 (20 overs)	v	Dambulla Viiking; 157/5 (19.2 overs)
Kusal Mendis 55 (45); Kasun Rajitha 2/16 (3 overs)		Angelo Perera 67 (49); Nuwan Pradeep 1/16 (2.2 overs)

Dambulla Viiking won by 5 wickets
Mahinda Rajapaksa International Cricket Stadium, Hambantota
Umpires: Lyndon Hannibal and Rohitha Kottahachchi
Player of the match: Angelo Perera (Dambulla Viiking)

- Kandy Tuskers won the toss and elected to bat.

Match 11
4 December 2020
20:00 (N)
Scorecard

Jaffna Stallions; 148/9 (20 overs)	v	Colombo Kings; 151/4 (19.2 overs)
Wanindu Hasaranga 41 (23); Qais Ahmad 3/24 (3 overs)		Dinesh Chandimal 68* (51); Wanindu Hasaranga 2/23 (4 overs)

Colombo Kings won by 6 wickets
Mahinda Rajapaksa International Cricket Stadium, Hambantota
Umpires: Keerthi Bandara and Raveendra Wimalasiri
Player of the match: Dinesh Chandimal (Colombo Kings)

- Colombo Kings won the toss and elected to field.
- Vijayakanth Viyaskanth (Jaffna Stallions) made his T20 debut.

Match 12
5 December 2020
15:30 (D/N)
Scorecard

Dambulla Viiking; 207/4 (20 overs)	v	Galle Gladiators; 198/7 (20 overs)
Upul Tharanga 77 (54); Dhananjaya Lakshan 2/39 (3 overs)		Danushka Gunathilaka 78 (52); Anwar Ali 3/37 (4 overs)

Dambulla Viiking won by 9 runs
Mahinda Rajapaksa International Cricket Stadium, Hambantota
Umpires: Asanga Jayasooriya and Prageeth Rambukwella
Player of the match: Anwar Ali (Dambulla Viiking)

- Dambulla Viiking won the toss and elected to bat.
- Dambulla Viiking and Jaffna Stallions qualified for the playoffs as a result of this match.

Match 13
5 December 2020
20:00 (N)
Scorecard

Kandy Tuskers; 105 (19.2 overs)	v	Colombo Kings; 108/3 (14.1 overs)
Rahmanullah Gurbaz 34 (21); Ashan Priyanjan 2/4 (1 over)		Dinesh Chandimal 35* (39); Nuwan Pradeep 1/10 (2.1 overs)

Colombo Kings won by 7 wickets
Mahinda Rajapaksa International Cricket Stadium, Hambantota
Umpires: Ravindra Kottahachchi and Ruchira Palliyaguruge
Player of the match: Dushmantha Chameera (Colombo Kings)

- Kandy Tuskers won the toss and elected to bat.
- Colombo Kings qualified for the playoffs as a result of this match.

Match 14
7 December 2020
15:30 (D/N)
Scorecard

Colombo Kings; 171 (20 overs)	v	Galle Gladiators; 175/2 (17.3 overs)
Daniel Bell-Drummond 44 (36); Mohammad Amir 5/26 (4 overs)		Ahsan Ali 56 (38); Qais Ahmad 1/23 (4 overs)

Galle Gladiators won by 8 wickets
Mahinda Rajapaksa International Cricket Stadium, Hambantota
Umpires: Deepal Gunawardene and Lyndon Hannibal
Player of the match: Mohammad Amir (Galle Gladiators)

- Colombo Kings won the toss and elected to bat.

Match 15
7 December 2020
20:00 (N)
Scorecard

Dambulla Viiking; 42/3 (7 overs)	v	Jaffna Stallions
Niroshan Dickwella 28* (21); Wanindu Hasaranga 1/0 (1 over)

No result
Mahinda Rajapaksa International Cricket Stadium, Hambantota
Umpires: Asanga Jayasooriya and Raveendra Wimalasiri

- Jaffna Stallions won the toss and elected to field.
- No further play was possible due to rain.

Match 16
9 December 2020
15:30 (D/N)
Scorecard

Jaffna Stallions; 150 (20 overs)	v	Kandy Tuskers; 151/4 (19.1 overs)
Shoaib Malik 59 (44); Nuwan Pradeep 3/36 (4 overs)		Asela Gunaratne 52* (37); Wanindu Hasaranga 2/23 (4 overs)

Kandy Tuskers won by 6 wickets
Mahinda Rajapaksa International Cricket Stadium, Hambantota
Umpires: Rohitha Kottahachchi and Prageeth Rambukwella
Player of the match: Asela Gunaratne (Kandy Tuskers)

- Jaffna Stallions won the toss and elected to bat.

Match 17
9 December 2020
20:00 (N)
Scorecard

Galle Gladiators; 168/7 (20 overs)	v	Dambulla Viiking; 174/6 (20 overs)
Danushka Gunathilaka 46 (31); Ramesh Mendis 2/28 (4 overs)		Samiullah Shinwari 46* (20); Dhananjaya Lakshan 2/33 (4 overs)

Dambulla Viiking won by 4 wickets
Mahinda Rajapaksa International Cricket Stadium, Hambantota
Umpires: Ravindra Kottahachchi and Ruchira Palliyaguruge
Player of the match: Samiullah Shinwari (Dambulla Viiking)

- Dambulla Viiking won the toss and elected to field.
- Dilshan Madushanka (Dambulla Viiking) made his T20 debut.

Match 18
10 December 2020
15:30 (D/N)
Scorecard

Colombo Kings; 173/4 (20 overs)	v	Jaffna Stallions; 167/6 (20 overs)
Laurie Evans 108* (65); Suranga Lakmal 1/26 (4 overs)		Charith Asalanka 32 (27); Andre Russell 3/46 (4 overs)

Colombo Kings won by 6 runs
Mahinda Rajapaksa International Cricket Stadium, Hambantota
Umpires: Keerthi Bandara and Lyndon Hannibal
Player of the match: Laurie Evans (Colombo Kings)

- Jaffna Stallions won the toss and elected to field.

Match 19
10 December 2020
20:00 (N)
Scorecard

Kandy Tuskers; 126 (19.1 overs)	v	Galle Gladiators; 130/1 (17 overs)
Kusal Mendis 68 (42); Nuwan Thushara 2/8 (2 overs)		Danushka Gunathilaka 94* (66); Dilruwan Perera 1/30 (4 overs)

Galle Gladiators won by 9 wickets
Mahinda Rajapaksa International Cricket Stadium, Hambantota
Umpires: Hemantha Boteju and Kumar Dharmasena
Player of the match: Danushka Gunathilaka (Galle Gladiators)

- Galle Gladiators won the toss and elected to field.
- Galle Gladiators qualified for the playoffs and Kandy Tuskers were eliminated as a result of this match.

Match 20
11 December 2020
20:00 (N)
Scorecard

Dambulla Viiking; 203/3 (20 overs)	v	Colombo Kings; 205/4 (18.5 overs)
Angelo Perera 74* (51); Qais Ahmad 2/23 (4 overs)		Laurie Evans 53* (24); Dasun Shanaka 1/20 (2 overs)

Colombo Kings won by 6 wickets
Mahinda Rajapaksa International Cricket Stadium, Hambantota
Umpires: Kumar Dharmasena and Prageeth Rambukwella
Player of the match: Qais Ahmad (Colombo Kings)

- Colombo Kings won the toss and elected to field.
- Kavindu Nadeeshan (Dambulla Viiking) made his T20 debut.

== Playoffs ==
Semifinals
1	Colombo Kings	150/9 (20 overs)
4	Galle Gladiators	151/8 (19.5 overs)
2	Dambulla Viiking	128 (19.1 overs)
3	Jaffna Stallions	165/9 (20 overs)

Final
4	Galle Gladiators	135/9 (20 overs)
3	Jaffna Stallions	188/6 (20 overs)

=== Semi-final 1 ===
13 December 2020
19:00 (N)
Scorecard

Colombo Kings; 150/9 (20 overs)	v	Galle Gladiators; 151/8 (19.5 overs)
Daniel Bell-Drummond 70 (53); Lakshan Sandakan 3/32 (4 overs)		Bhanuka Rajapaksa 33 (17); Ashan Priyanjan 2/42 (4 overs)

Galle Gladiators won by 2 wickets
Mahinda Rajapaksa International Cricket Stadium, Hambantota
Umpires: Kumar Dharmasena and Raveendra Wimalasiri
Player of the match: Dhananjaya Lakshan (Galle Gladiators)

- Galle Gladiators won the toss and elected to field.

=== Semi-final 2 ===
14 December 2020
19:00 (N)
Scorecard

Jaffna Stallions; 165/9 (20 overs)	v	Dambulla Viiking; 128 (19.1 overs)
Johnson Charles 76 (56); Malinda Pushpakumara 2/24 (4 overs)		Upul Tharanga 33 (39); Wanindu Hasaranga 3/15 (4 overs)

Jaffna Stallions won by 37 runs
Mahinda Rajapaksa International Cricket Stadium, Hambantota
Umpires: Lyndon Hannibal and Ruchira Palliyaguruge
Player of the match: Johnson Charles (Jaffna Stallions)

- Dambulla Viiking won the toss and elected to field.

=== Final ===
16 December 2020
19:00 (N)
Scorecard

Jaffna Stallions; 188/6 (20 overs)	v	Galle Gladiators; 135/9 (20 overs)
Shoaib Malik 46 (35); Dhananjaya Lakshan 3/36 (4 overs)		Bhanuka Rajapaksa 40 (17); Shoaib Malik 2/13 (3 overs)

Jaffna Stallions won by 53 runs
Mahinda Rajapaksa International Cricket Stadium, Hambantota
Umpires: Kumar Dharmasena and Ruchira Palliyaguruge
Player of the match: Shoaib Malik (Jaffna Stallions)

- Jaffna Stallions won the toss and elected to bat.

== Statistics ==
=== Most runs ===
Player	Team	Matches	Runs	High score
Danushka Gunathilaka	Galle Gladiators	10	476	94*
Laurie Evans	Colombo Kings	8	289	108*
Dasun Shanaka	Dambulla Viiking	9	278	73
Avishka Fernando	Jaffna Stallions	9	275	92*
Niroshan Dickwella	Dambulla Viiking	9	270	65

- Source: ESPNcricinfo

=== Most wickets ===
Player	Team	Matches	Wickets	Best bowling
Wanindu Hasaranga	Jaffna Stallions	10	17	3/15
Dhananjaya Lakshan	Galle Gladiators	8	13	3/36
Qais Ahmad	Colombo Kings	9	12	3/24
Lakshan Sandakan	Galle Gladiators	8	12	3/32
Mohammad Amir	Galle Gladiators	10	11	5/26

- Source: ESPNcricinfo
