= 2022 Lanka Premier League final =

Final match of the LPL 2022

2022 Lanka Premier League Final
- Event: 2022 Lanka Premier League
Colombo Stars	Jaffna Kings
163/5	164/8
20 overs	19.2 overs
- Jaffna Kings won by 2 wickets
- Date: 23 December 2022
- Venue: R. Premadasa Stadium, Colombo
- Player of the match: Avishka Fernando (Jaffna Kings)
- Umpires: Kumar Dharmasena (Sri Lanka); Wayne Knights (New Zealand)

The 2022 Lanka Premier League Final was played on 23 December 2022 at the R. Premadasa Stadium in Colombo. Colombo Stars qualified for the finals after their win in Qualifier 1. They will competed with Jaffna Kings, who qualified for the finals after their winning in Qualifier 2.

Jaffna Kings won the toss and elected to field first. Batting first Colombo Stars made 163 runs off 5 wickets in their 20 overs. In response, Jaffna Kings chased the target in 19.4 overs and won the match by 2 wickets. Thus, Jaffna Kings won their third LPL title. Avishka Fernando from Jaffna Kings was named as the player of the match as well as the player of the tournament.

== Match ==
=== Match officials ===
- On-field umpires: Kumar Dharmasena (SL) and Wayne Knights (NZ)
- Third umpire: Ruchira Palliyaguruge (SL)
- Reserve umpire: Raveendra Wimalasiri (SL)
- Match referee: Graeme Labrooy (SL)

=== Summary ===
Match 24
23 December 2022
19:30 (N)
Scorecard

Colombo Stars; 163/5 (20 overs)	v	Jaffna Kings; 164/8 (19.2 overs)
Dinesh Chandimal 49 (40); Thisara Perera 1/16 (2 overs)		Avishka Fernando 50 (43); Suranga Lakmal 3/23 (3 overs)

Jaffna Kings won by 2 wickets
R. Premadasa Stadium, Colombo
Umpires: Kumar Dharmasena (SL) and Wayne Knights (NZ)
Player of the match: Avishka Fernando (Jaffna Kings)

- Jaffna Kings won the toss and elected to field.
