= Sebastianpillai Vijeyaraj =

Sri Lankan cricketer

Personal information
- Full name: Sebastianpillai Vijeyaraj
- Born: 1 December 1993 (age 32); Kilinochchi, Sri Lanka
- Source: , 14 June 2024

Sebastianpillai Vijeyaraj is a Sri Lankan cricketer. He plays for the Jaffna Stallions in the Lanka Premier League and the Sinhalese Sports Club in the Major League Tournament.

== Playing style ==
His batting style is a right hand bat and a bowling style of a right arm fast.
