= Usman Shinwari =

Pakistani cricketer

Personal information
- Full name: Usman Khan Shinwari
- Born: 5 January 1994 (age 32); Khyber Agency, Khyber Pakhtunkhwa, Pakistan
- Batting: Right-handed
- Bowling: Left-arm medium-fast
- Role: Bowler

International information
- National side: Pakistan (2013–2019)
- Only Test (cap 240): 11 December 2019 v Sri Lanka
- ODI debut (cap 216): 20 October 2017 v Sri Lanka
- Last ODI: 2 October 2019 v Sri Lanka
- T20I debut (cap 58): 11 December 2013 v Sri Lanka
- Last T20I: 9 October 2019 v Sri Lanka

Domestic team information
- Years: Team
- 2017–2019; 2022: Karachi Kings (squad no. 14)
- 2017: Sylhet Sixers
- 2018: Melbourne Renegades
- 2019–present: Khyber Pakhtunkhwa
- 2020: Lahore Qalandars (squad no. 14)
- 2020: Jaffna Stallions
- 2021: Quetta Gladiators

Career statistics
| Competition | Test | ODI | T20I |
|---|---|---|---|
| Matches | 1 | 17 | 16 |
| Runs scored | – | 6 | 2 |
| Batting average | – | 2.00 | – |
| 100s/50s | – | 0/0 | 0/0 |
| Top score | – | 6 | 2* |
| Balls bowled | 90 | 720 | 282 |
| Wickets | 1 | 34 | 13 |
| Bowling average | 54.00 | 18.65 | 32.60 |
| 5 wickets in innings | 0 | 2 | 0 |
| 10 wickets in match | 0 | 0 | 0 |
| Best bowling | 1/54 | 5/34 | 3/31 |
| Catches/stumpings | 0/– | 3/– | 1/– |
- Source: Cricinfo, 5 March 2021

Usman Khan Shinwari (Urdu, Pashto: عثمان شينواری; born 5 January 1994) is a Pakistani former international cricketer. He is a left-arm fast bowler, who plays for the Zarai Taraqiati Bank Ltd cricket team (ZTBL) in Pakistan's first-class cricket circuit. He has also previously played for the Khan Research Laboratories cricket team. In December 2013, he bowled ZTBL to victory in the national T20 final with figures of 5 wickets for 9 runs in four overs. He was subsequently picked for the national side in the T20 series against Sri Lanka in the UAE.

In August 2018, Shinwari was one of thirty-three players to be awarded a central contract for the 2018–19 season by the Pakistan Cricket Board (PCB). In November 2021, he announced his retirement from first-class cricket.

== Early life and career ==
Usman Shinwari belongs to the Shinwari tribe (Ghani Khel sub-tribe) of the Pashtuns. He grew up in Landi Kotal, a town in Khyber District, Pakistan, on the border with Afghanistan. He started his cricket career from the Tatara Ground in Landi Kotal, which is named after the nearby Tatara hills, encouraged by his family, his father having been a cricket enthusiast and his brother Ibrahim Shinwari having played at U16 level. Usman later joined Peshawar's Islamia Cricket Academy run by former Pakistan international Arshad Khan.

== Domestic and franchise career ==
He plays domestic cricket for the ZTBL. On 3 December 2013, he took 5 wickets for 9 runs (including the wicket of Misbah-ul-Haq) to help ZTBL beat Sui Northern Gas Pipelines Limited in the final of the Faysal Bank T20 Cup for departments. He was also the tournament's leading wicket-taker with 11 wickets in six games.

In April 2018, he was named in Federal Areas' squad for the 2018 Pakistan Cup.

In July 2019, he was selected to play for the Glasgow Giants in the inaugural edition of the Euro T20 Slam cricket tournament. However, the following month the tournament was cancelled. In October 2020, he was drafted by the Jaffna Stallions for the inaugural edition of the Lanka Premier League.

In January 2021, he was named in Khyber Pakhtunkhwa's squad for the 2020–21 Pakistan Cup. In November 2021, he was selected to play for the Jaffna Kings following the players' draft for the 2021 Lanka Premier League. In July 2022, he was signed by the Kandy Falcons for the third edition of the Lanka Premier League.

== International career ==
On basis of his domestic performance, PCB selection committee selected Usman for the 2013–14 T20I series against Sri Lanka, started on 11 December 2013 in the UAE.

He was given only one over in his debut game versus Sri Lanka at the DSC after it went for 9 runs. He was given his full quota of 4 overs in the next T20 and went for 52 runs. He also scored 2* off 3 balls.

In March 2017, he was named in Pakistan's Twenty20 International (T20I) squad for their matches against the West Indies. In October 2017, he was added to Pakistan's One Day International (ODI) squad for their series against Sri Lanka. He made his ODI debut for Pakistan against Sri Lanka on 20 October 2017. In the second match of his career, he took his maiden five-wicket haul, completing it in only 21 deliveries. Pakistan won the match comprehensively, beating Sri Lanka 5–0. He was awarded with man of the match award.

In December 2019, he was named in Pakistan's Test squad for the two-match series against Sri Lanka. He made his Test debut for Pakistan against Sri Lanka on 11 December 2019.

In June 2020, he was named in a 29-man squad for Pakistan's tour to England during the COVID-19 pandemic. In July, he was shortlisted in Pakistan's 20-man squad for the Test matches against England.

On 9 September 2025, Shinwari announced his retirement from international cricket.
