= Dhananjaya Lakshan =

Sri Lankan cricketer

Personal information
- Full name: Pothotuwa Arachchige Dhananjaya Lakshan
- Born: 5 October 1998 (age 28); Galle, Sri Lanka
- Batting: Left-handed
- Bowling: Right-arm medium-fast
- Role: All rounder

International information
- National side: Sri Lanka
- Only ODI (cap 200): 29 June 2021 v England

Domestic team information
- Years: Team
- 2018–present: Colts Cricket Club
- 2020: Galle Gladiators
- 2025–present: Pokhara Avengers

Career statistics
Competition	ODI	FC	LA	T20
Matches	1	20	37	47
Runs scored	2	914	1,028	526
Batting average	2.00	28.56	34.26	15.02
100s/50s	0/0	2/3	1/8	0/2
Top score	2	141	106*	63
Balls bowled	12	1,191	780	527
Wickets	0	22	26	32
Bowling average	–	32.68	29.57	23.68
5 wickets in innings	–	0	0	0
10 wickets in match	–	0	0	0
Best bowling	–	3/24	3/37	3/17
Catches/stumpings	0/–	10/–	11/–	18/–
- Source: Cricinfo, 31 July 2022

Pothotuwa Arachchige Dhananjaya Lakshan (born 5 October 1998), popularly known as Dhananjaya Lakshan, is a professional Sri Lankan cricketer. He made his international debut for the Sri Lanka cricket team in June 2021.

== Domestic career ==
In April 2018, he was named in Galle's squad for the 2018 Super Provincial One Day Tournament. He made his List A debut for Galle in the 2018 Super Provincial One Day Tournament on 11 May 2018. Prior to his List A debut, he was named in Sri Lanka's squad for the 2018 Under-19 Cricket World Cup.

In August 2018, he was named in Kandy's squad the 2018 SLC T20 League. He made his Twenty20 debut for Kandy on 21 August 2018. He made his first-class debut for Colts Cricket Club in the 2018–19 Premier League Tournament on 7 December 2016. In October 2020, he was drafted by the Galle Gladiators for the inaugural edition of the Lanka Premier League. In August 2021, he was named in the SLC Blues team for the 2021 SLC Invitational T20 League tournament.

In November 2021, he was selected to play for the Galle Gladiators following the players' draft for the 2021 Lanka Premier League. In July 2022, he was signed by the Colombo Stars for the third edition of the Lanka Premier League.

== International career ==
In June 2021, Lakshan was named in Sri Lanka's squad for their tour of England. He made his One Day International (ODI) debut on 29 June 2021, for Sri Lanka against England. In July 2021, he was named in Sri Lanka's squad for their series against India.

In April 2022, Sri Lanka Cricket (SLC) named him as the T20 captain of the Sri Lanka Emerging Team for their tour to England. In June 2022, he was named in the Sri Lanka A squad for their matches against Australia A during Australia's tour of Sri Lanka.
