= Mahinda Rajapaksa International Cricket Stadium =

Cricket stadium in Sri Lanka

Mahinda Rajapaksha International Cricket Stadium
- Sooriyawewa International Cricket Stadium
- Interactive map of Mahinda Rajapaksha International Cricket Stadium

Ground information
- Location: Sooriyawewa, Hambantota District, Sri Lanka
- Coordinates: 6°21′14.5″N 81°1′36.5″E
- Establishment: 2009
- Capacity: 35,000
- Owner: Sri Lanka Cricket
- Operator: Sri Lanka Cricket
- Tenants: Sri Lanka Cricket
- End names
- Thanamalwila End; Sooriyawewa End

International information
- First men's ODI: 20 February 2011: Sri Lanka v Canada
- Last men's ODI: 24 August 2023: Afghanistan v Pakistan
- First men's T20I: 1 June 2012: Sri Lanka v Pakistan
- Last men's T20I: 6 August 2013: Sri Lanka v South Africa
- First women's ODI: 16 March 2019: Sri Lanka v England
- Last women's ODI: 21 June 2024: Sri Lanka v West Indies
- First women's T20I: 24 June 2024: Sri Lanka v West Indies
- Last women's T20I: 28 June 2024: Sri Lanka v West Indies
- As of 28 June 2024; Source: ESPNcricinfo; CricketArchive

Mahinda Rajapaksa International Cricket Stadium, also known as Sooriyawewa International Cricket Stadium (Sinhala: මහින්ද රාජපක්ෂ ජාත්‍යන්තර ක්‍රිකට් ක්‍රීඩාංගනය, Tamil: மஹிந்த ராஜபக்ஷ சர்வதேச துடுப்பாட்டு அரங்கம்), and abbreviately as MRIC Stadium, is an international cricket stadium in Sooriyawewa, Sri Lanka. It was built for the 2011 Cricket World Cup and hosted two matches, the first being Sri Lanka against Canada, on 20 February 2011. The stadium has a capacity of 35,000 people making It the second largest stadium in Sri Lanka.

== History ==
The proposal for a new International Cricket Stadium at Sooriyawewa was part of the government's programme to develop sports in the Southern Province of Sri Lanka as part of the government's plan to transform Hambantota into the second major urban hub of Sri Lanka, away from Colombo.

The following 2011 Cricket World Cup matches were held at Hambantota International Cricket Stadium in February 2011. The first official international match was between Sri Lanka and Canada on 20 February 2011, which Sri Lanka won by 210 runs. Two matches were played at the venue during the World Cup.

The Mahinda Rajapaksa International Stadium hosted three 2012 ICC World Twenty20 matches and the inaugural edition of Lanka Premier League in 2020. The curator of the ground is Ravi Dissanayake and Manager is Colonel Shanaka Ratnayake.

== Criticism ==
With low coverage of international matches in very rural areas, it has come under extreme criticism and has been called a white elephant as only a few matches were held in the stadium considering the extreme costs for construction and maintenance. The finance minister criticized the former government for hiding the true story of actual cost of its construction. To gain revenue the Stadium is often hired out for wedding receptions, however, former Prime Minister Ranil Wickremesinghe has proposed that the stadium should be used for training purposes to gain revenue.

In 2016, after the inspections by Sri Lanka Cricket, president Thilanga Sumathipala pointed out that the walls, carpets, furniture and equipment in the stadium were in a severe state of neglect and deterioration without any attempt to revive the facility to its earlier status.

== Lanka Premier League ==
Initially, 2020 Lanka Premier League was scheduled to be held in Kandy, Dambulla and Hambantota. Due to COVID-19 pandemic in Sri Lanka, health officials agreed to reduce the quarantine period for foreign players from 14 days to 7 days. Following the urging of health officials, all 23 matches would be held at the Mahinda Rajapaksa Stadium. In 2021 venue hosted 2021 Lanka Premier League Playoffs matches as well.

== World Cup Cricket ==
In 2011, Mahinda Rajapaksa International Stadium hosted two World Cup matches.

=== 2011 Cricket World Cup ===
20 February 2011 (D/N)
Scorecard

Sri Lanka; 332/7 (50 overs)	v	Canada; 122 (36.5 overs)
Mahela Jayawardene 100 (81); John Davison 2/56 (8 overs)		Rizwan Cheema 37 (35); Nuwan Kulasekara 3/16 (6 overs)

Sri Lanka won by 210 runs
Mahinda Rajapaksa International Stadium, Hambantota, Sri Lanka
Umpires: Ian Gould and Shavir Tarapore
Player of the match: Mahela Jayawardene (SL)

- Sri Lanka won the toss and elected to bat first.

23 February 2011 (D/N)
Scorecard

Pakistan; 317/7 (50 overs)	v	Kenya; 112 (33.1 overs)
Umar Akmal 71 (52); Thomas Odoyo 3/41 (7 overs)		Collins Obuya 47 (58); Shahid Afridi 5/16 (8 overs)

Pakistan won by 205 runs
Mahinda Rajapaksa International Stadium, Hambantota, Sri Lanka
Umpires: Tony Hill and Nigel Llong
Player of the match: Umar Akmal (Pak)

- Pakistan won the toss and elected to bat first.

== ICC World Twenty20 ==
Sri Lanka hosted the 2012 ICC World Twenty20. Three matches were played at Mahinda Rajapaksa International Stadium. Other matches were played at R. Premadasa Stadium and Pallekele International Cricket Stadium.

=== 2012 ICC World Twenty20 ===
18 September 2012 (D/N)
Scorecard

Sri Lanka; 182/4 (20 Overs)	v	Zimbabwe; 100 (17.3 Overs)
Kumar Sangakkara 44(26); Graeme Cremer 1/27 (4 Overs)		Hamilton Masakadza 20 (23); Ajantha Mendis 6/8 (4 Overs)

Sri Lanka won by 82 runs
Mahinda Rajapaksa International Stadium, Hambantota, Sri Lanka
Umpires: Ian Gould and Rod Tucker
Player of the match: Ajantha Mendis (SL)

- Zimbabwe won the toss and elected to field first.

20 September 2012 (D/N)
Scorecard

Zimbabwe; 93/8 (20 overs)	v	South Africa; 94/0 (12.4 overs)
Craig Ervine 37 (40); Jacques Kallis 4/15 (4 overs)		Richard Levi 50* (43)

South Africa won by 10 wickets
Mahinda Rajapaksa International Stadium, Hambantota, Sri Lanka
Umpires: Steve Davis and Richard Kettleborough
Player of the match: Jacques Kallis (SA)

- South Africa won the toss and elected to field

22 September 2012 (D/N)
Scorecard

South Africa; 78/4 (7 overs)	v	Sri Lanka; 46/5 (7 overs)
AB de Villiers 30 (13); Nuwan Kulasekara 1/9 (1 over)		Kumar Sangakkara 13 (11); Dale Steyn 2/10 (2 overs)

South Africa won by 32 runs
Mahinda Rajapaksa International Stadium, Hambantota, Sri Lanka
Umpires: Richard Kettleborough (Eng) and Rod Tucker (Aus)
Player of the match: AB de Villiers (SA)

- Sri Lanka won the toss and elected to field

== International five-wicket hauls ==
As of 1 September 2019

Three five-wicket hauls have been taken at Mahinda Rajapaksa International Cricket Stadium in Sooriyawewa, all in men's limited-overs international matches.

=== One Day International five-wicket hauls ===
Five-wicket hauls in Men's One Day International matches at Mahinda Rajapaksa International Cricket Stadium
No.	Bowler	Date	Team	Opposing Team	Inn	O	R	W	Result
1	Shahid Afridi	23 February 2011 (Note: This match was part of the 2011 Cricket World Cup.)	Pakistan	Kenya	2	8	16	5	Pakistan won
2	Lasith Malinga	16 August 2011	Sri Lanka	Australia	2	8.2	28	5	Sri Lanka won
3	Haris Rauf	22 August 2023	Pakistan	Afghanistan	2	6.2	18	5	Pakistan won

=== Twenty20 International five-wicket hauls ===
Five-wicket hauls in Men's Twenty20 International matches at Mahinda Rajapaksa International Cricket Stadium
No.	Bowler	Date	Team	Opposing Team	Inn	O	R	W	Result
1	Ajantha Mendis	18 September 2012 (Note: This match was part of the 2012 ICC World Twenty20.)	Sri Lanka	Zimbabwe	2	4	8	6	Sri Lanka won

== See also ==
- List of international cricket grounds in Sri Lanka
