= Lanka Premier League =

Sri Lankan professional Twenty20 cricket league

- Logo of Lanka Premier League
- Countries: Sri Lanka
- Administrator: Sri Lanka Cricket
- Format: Twenty20
- First edition: 2020
- Latest edition: 2026
- Next edition: 2027
- Tournament format: Double Round-robin and playoffs
- Number of teams: 5
- Current champion: Galle Gallants (1st title) (2026)
- Most successful: Jaffna Kings (4 titles)
- Most runs: Avishka Fernando (1,776)
- Most wickets: Wanindu Hasaranga (78)
- Website: lankapremierleaguet20.com

The Lanka Premier League (abbreviated as LPL; Sinhala: ලංකා ප්‍රිමියර් ලීග්, Tamil: லங்கா பிரீமியர் லீக்) is a professional franchise cricket league established in 2020 in Sri Lanka. Matches are played using the Twenty20 cricket format by five teams named after Sri Lankan cities. The league was intended to commence in 2018, but repeatedly postponed by Sri Lanka Cricket (SLC). The inaugural edition took place in 2020 amidst the COVID-19 pandemic.

As of 2026, there have been six seasons of the tournament. The current title holder team is Galle Gallants, who won their maiden title in the 2026 Lanka Premier League by defeating Jaffna Kings in the final.

== History ==
The first season of the league was initially planned to be held from 18 August to 10 September 2018, but this was postponed multiple times due to administrative issues within Sri Lanka Cricket. In June 2020, during the COVID-19 pandemic, SLC announced the tournament would start on 28 August 2020, with 70 overseas players showing an interest in playing in the league. In August 2020, Ravin Wickramaratne, the Vice President of SLC was officially appointed as the director of the tournament. After being rescheduled due to pandemic related restrictions, the first season began on 26 November 2020.

In May 2022, Samantha Dodanwala was officially appointed as the LPL tournament director. The third edition was scheduled to take place in August 2022, but due to the ongoing Sri Lankan economic crisis and the resultant 2022 Sri Lankan protests, was postponed despite the player draft having already been held.

== Teams ==
Locations of Lanka Premier League teams

=== Current teams ===
Team	City	Debut	Captain	Head coach	Owner
Colombo Kaps	Colombo, Western Province	2020	Kamindu Mendis	Chamara Kapugedera	Witness Sports Alliance
Dambulla Sixers	Dambulla, Central Province	2020	Dinesh Chandimal	Rangana Herath	Sequoia Consultants
Galle Gallants	Galle, Southern Province	2020	Dasun Shanaka	Pubudu Dassanayake	Gallant Sports & Media LLC
Jaffna Kings	Jaffna, Northern Province	2020	Bhanuka Rajapaksha	Thilina Kandamby	Anchor Sports
Kandy Royals	Kandy, Central Province	2020	Angelo Mathews	Chaminda Vaas	Kandy Royals LLC

=== Franchise history ===
Season Franchise (Owner)	2020	2021	2022	2023	2024	2026
Colombo	Colombo Kings (Murfad Mustafa)	Colombo Stars (Softlogic Holdings)		Colombo Strikers (SKKY Group)		Colombo Kaps (Witness Sports Alliance)
Dambulla	Dambulla Viiking (Sachiin Joshi)	Dambulla Giants (Qamar Khan)	Dambulla Aura (Viranjith Thambugala)		Dambulla Sixers (Sequoia Consultants)	
Galle	Galle Gladiators (Nadeem Omar)			Galle Titans (Nayana Wasalathilake)	Galle Marvels (Cricket Marvels LLC)	Galle Gallants (Gallant Sports & Media LLC)
Jaffna	Jaffna Stallions (Anandan Arnold; Rahul Sood)	Jaffna Kings (Lyca Mobile)				Jaffna Kings (Sports Commune, later Anchor Sports)
Kandy	Kandy Tuskers (Sohail Khan; Abbas Muni)	Kandy Warriors (Ravi Gupta, Pankaj Tripathi)	Kandy Falcons (Parvez Khan)	B-Love Kandy (B-Love Network)	Kandy Falcons (Note: Sri Lanka Cricket severed ties with B-Love Network. Management of the team passed on to the tournament organisers, the IPG Group.)	Kandy Royals (Sandhya Ajjarapu)

== Organisation ==
=== Player acquisition, squad composition and salaries ===
In the league's first three seasons, teams chose players using a draft system, having previously had the opportunity to sign a limited number of players directly. For the 2023 season, an auction was introduced. Each franchise was allowed to directly sign two local players and two overseas players ahead of the auction. Each franchise operated with a salary cap of US$1 million, US500,000 of which could be spent on direct signings with the remaining spent in the auction.

=== Governing Council ===
Sri Lanka Cricket, which is responsible for all elements of the tournament, established a governing council to administer the league. Members of the governing council include Sri Lanka Cricket CEO Ashley de Silva. The marketing and organisation rights to the LPL were awarded to an Indian-owned Dubai-based company, Innovative Production Group (IPG), in 2020.

=== Finances ===
The inaugural edition of the league reached a cumulative audience of 557 million through TV, digital-social media and traditional media. According to the 2021 Annual Report of Sri Lanka Cricket, The league generated revenue of LKR334 million in 2020, LKR463 million in 2021, LKR839 million in 2022.

Franchise	Valuation
Jaffna Stallions	US$3.98 million
Galle Gladiators	US$3.82 million
Dambulla Viiking	US$3.54 million
Colombo Kings	US$3.44 million
Kandy Tuskers	US$3.19 million

Source: Newswire.lk, June 2021

Revenue analysis
Season	Revenue (LKR mil)	YoY revenue growth	No. of matches	Revenue per match (LKR mil)	YoY revenue per match growth (LKR)	Revenue per match (€ thousands)	YoY revenue per match growth (€)
2020	334	—N/a	23	14.522	—N/a	66.788 (Note: exchange rate of 1 EUR = 217.4295 LKR used here for 2020 season.)	—N/a
2021	463	38.62%	24	19.292	32.85%	85.766 (Note: exchange rate of 1 EUR = 224.9337 LKR used here for 2021 season.)	28.42%
2022	839	81.21%	24	34.958	81.20%	90.953 (Note: exchange rate of 1 EUR = 384.3541 LKR used here for 2022 season.)	6.05%
2023	831	(0.95%)	24	34.625	(0.95%)	102.940 (Note: exchange rate of 1 EUR = 336.3600 LKR used here for 2023 season.)	13.18%

== Criticism ==
Sports Minister Roshan Ranasinghe raised the issue of the need to regulate Lanka Premier League franchise owners and sponsors during the parliamentary adjournment debate on Sri Lanka Cricket's expenditure for the 2022 ICC Men's T20 World Cup. Some of the 2023 Lanka Premier League sponsors included gambling companies and unauthorized foreign exchange trading platforms. Minister of Justice Wijeyadasa Rajapakshe claimed that B-Love Network, the owners of the Kandy franchise, is banned in Sri Lanka.

== Tournament seasons and results ==
Out of the five franchises that have played in the league, the Jaffna franchise has won four titles, while the Kandy franchise has won only one title.

=== Finals ===
Season	Final				Player of the season
Season	Winners	Result	Runners-up	Venue	Player of the season
2020	Jaffna Stallions; 188/6 (20 overs)	Jaffna Stallions won by 53 runs Scorecard	Galle Gladiators; 135/9 (20 overs)	Mahinda Rajapaksa International Cricket Stadium, Hambantota	Wanindu Hasaranga (Jaffna Stallions)
2021	Jaffna Kings; 201/3 (20 overs)	Jaffna Kings won by 23 runs Scorecard	Galle Gladiators; 178/9 (20 overs)	Mahinda Rajapaksa International Cricket Stadium, Hambantota	Avishka Fernando (Jaffna Kings)
2022	Jaffna Kings; 164/8 (19.2 overs)	Jaffna Kings won by 2 wickets Scorecard	Colombo Stars; 163/5 (20 overs)	R. Premadasa Stadium, Colombo	Sadeera Samarawickrama (Jaffna Kings)
2023	B-Love Kandy; 151/5 (19.5 overs)	B-Love Kandy won by 5 wickets Scorecard	Dambulla Aura; 147/4 (20 overs)	R. Premadasa Stadium, Colombo	Wanindu Hasaranga (B-Love Kandy)
2024	Jaffna Kings; 185/1 (15.4 overs)	Jaffna Kings won by 9 wickets Scorecard	Galle Marvels; 184/6 (20 overs)	R. Premadasa Stadium, Colombo	Rilee Rossouw (Jaffna Kings)
2026	Galle Gallants; 126/5 (15.5 overs)	Galle Gallants won by 5 wickets Scorecard	Jaffna Kings; 123 (19.3 overs)	R. Premadasa Stadium, Colombo	Kamil Mishara (Jaffna Kings)

=== Team playing records ===
As of 9 August 2026

Teams	Mat	Won	Lost	Tie & W	Tie & L	NR	Win%
Colombo Kaps	56	26	29	1	0	0	48.21
Dambulla Sixers	53	23	25	0	2	3	46.00
Galle Gallants	60	25	32	2	0	1	45.76
Jaffna Kings	61	38	21	0	0	2	64.40
Kandy Royals	56	25	30	0	1	0	44.64

Source: Cricinfo

Notes:

- Tie & W and Tie & L indicates the matches tied and then won by or lost by super over respectively.

== Team's performance ==
Season Franchise	2020	2021	2022	2023	2024	2026
Colombo Kaps	3rd	4th	RU	5th	4th	3rd
Dambulla Sixers	4th	3rd	5th	RU	5th	5th
Galle Gallants	RU	RU	4th	3rd	RU	C
Jaffna Kings	C	C	C	4th	C	RU
Kandy Royals	5th	5th	3rd	C	3rd	4th

== Records ==
As of 4 October 2024

Batting Records
Most runs	Avishka Fernando (Jaffna Kings, Dambulla Sixers)	1,544
Highest score	Lahiru Udara (Kandy Royals)	132* vs Galle Gallants (29 July 2026)
Highest partnership	Kusal Mendis & Rilee Rossouw (Jaffna Kings)	185* vs Galle Marvels (21 July 2024)
Most fifties	Avishka Fernando (Jaffna Kings, Dambulla Sixers)	15
Most sixes	Avishka Fernando (Jaffna Kings, Dambulla Sixers)	78
Bowling Records
Most wickets	Wanindu Hasaranga (Jaffna Kings, Kandy Royals)	72
Best bowling figures	Wanindu Hasaranga (B-Love Kandy)	6/9 vs Jaffna Kings (17 August 2023)
Fielding Records
Most dismissals (wicket-keeper)	Niroshan Dickwella (Dambulla Sixers, Colombo Kaps, Galle Marvels)	30
Most catches (fielder)	Wanindu Hasaranga (Jaffna Kings, Kandy Royals)	34
Team records
Highest total	Jaffna Kings	242/2 (20) vs Galle Gallants (5 August 2026)
Lowest total	Dambulla Giants	69 (14.1) vs Jaffna Kings (13 December 2021)

- Source: records extracted from Cricinfo

== Broadcasters ==
Country	TV Channel	Online Streaming
Sri Lanka	Monara TV (Note: 2024–present); Star Sports (Note: 2023–present); ThePapare TV	Dialog ViU App; PEO Mobile App; ThePapare.com
Australia	Fox Sports (Note: 2021; 2023–present)	—N/a
Bangladesh	T Sports (Note: 2021; 2024–present)	IScreen (Note: 2026–present)
India	Star Sports	FanCode
New Zealand	Sky Sport NZ	—N/a
Pakistan	A Sports	Tapmad
Pakistan	A Sports	Myco
South Africa	—N/a	SytxSports.com
Rest of the world	—N/a	Monara TV YouTube; SLC YouTube

== See also ==
- List of Lanka Premier League centuries
- List of Lanka Premier League five-wicket hauls
