= 2025 Bangladesh Premier League players' draft =

Cricket player selection

2025 Bangladesh Premier League players draft

General information
- Sport: Cricket
- Date: 14 October 2024
- Time: 11:00 am BST
- Location: Radisson Blu Water Garden Dhaka

Overview
- League: Bangladesh Premier League
- Team: 7
- Expansion team: 1
- Expansion season: 2025

The players' draft for the 2025 Bangladesh Premier League took place on 14 October 2024 at the Radisson Blu Water Garden Dhaka.

== Salary cap ==
=== Local players ===
216 local players were listed into seven categories with the following salary cap:-

- Category A – ৳80 lakh (US$65,000)
- Category B – ৳50 lakh (US$41,000)
- Category C – ৳30 lakh (US$24,000)
- Category D – ৳20 lakh (US$16,000)
- Category E – ৳15 lakh (US$12,000)
- Category F – ৳10 lakh (US$8,100)

=== Foreign players ===
- Category A – US$80,000
- Category B – US$60,000
- Category C – US$40,000
- Category D – US$30,000
- Category E – US$20,000

== Drafted players ==
This is the list of players that were drafted.

Fortune Barishal	Khulna Tigers	Dhaka Capitals	Sylhet Strikers	Rangpur Riders	Chittagong Kings	Durbar Rajshahi
Mahmudullah; Tanvir Islam; Najmul Hossain; Ripon Mondol; Ebadot Hossain; Nayeem Hasan; Rishad Hossain; Taijul Islam; Shohidul Islam; Ariful Islam; James Fuller; Pathum Nissanka; Nandre Burger	Hasan Mahmud; Mohammad Naim; Imrul Kayes; Mahidul Islam Ankon; Abu Hider Rony; Ziaur Rahman; Mahfuzur Rahman Rabby; Mahmudul Hasan Joy (local); Mohammad Hasnain; Lewis Gregory; Mohammad Nawaz (foreign)	Litton Das; Habibur Rahman Sohan; Mukidul Islam; Abu Jayed; Sabbir Rahman; Munim Shahriar; Asif Hasan; Shahadat Hossain Dipu; Musfik Hasan (local); Saim Ayub; Amir Hamza Hotak (foreign)	Rony Talukder; Mashrafe Bin Mortaza; Al-Amin Hossain; Arafat Sunny; Ruyel Miah; Ariful Haque; Nihaduzzaman; Nahidul Islam (local); Rahkeem Cornwall; Samiullah Shinwari; Reece Topley (foreign)	Nahid Rana; Saif Hassan; Soumya Sarkar; Rakibul Hasan; Rejaur Rahman Raja; Irfan Sukkur; Kamrul Islam Rabbi; Tawfique Khan Tushar (local); Akif Javed; Curtis Campher (foreign)	Shamim Hossain; Parvez Hossain Emon; Khaled Ahmed; Aliss Islam; Mohammad Mithun; Naeem Islam; Maruf Mridha; Rahatul Ferdous; Sheikh Parvez Jibon; Marshall Ayub (local); Graham Clarke; Tom O'Connell (foreign)	Taskin Ahmed; Jishan Alam; Yasir Ali; Sabbir Hossain; Sanjamul Islam; SM Meherob; Akbar Ali; Hasan Murad; Shafiul Islam; Mohor Sheikh (local); Saad Nasim; Lahiru Samarakoon (foreign)

== Direct signings ==
These are the direct signings of every team.

=== Dhaka Capitals ===
Direct signings:

- Mustafizur Rahman
- Tanzid Hasan Tamim

Foreign direct signings:

- Thisara Perera
- Johnson Charles
- Amir Hamza
- Shahnawaz Dahani
- Stephen Eskinazi

=== Chittagong Kings ===
Direct signings:

- Shakib Al Hasan
- Shoriful Islam

Foreign direct signings:

- Moeen Ali
- Usman Khan
- Haider Ali
- Angelo Mathews
- Mohammad Wasim Jr
- Binura Fernando

=== Durbar Rajshahi ===
- Anamul Haque Bijoy

=== Fortune Barishal ===
Direct signings:

- Towhid Hridoy

Foreign direct signings:

- Kyle Mayers
- Dawid Malan
- Mohammad Nabi
- Faheem Ashraf
- Ali Mohammad
- Jahandad Khan

=== Sylhet Strikers ===
Direct signings:

- Jaker Ali Anik

Foreign direct signings:

- Paul Stirling
- George Munsey

=== Khulna Tigers ===
Direct signings:

- Mehidy Hasan

Foreign direct signing:

- Oshane Thomas

=== Rangpur Riders ===
Direct signing:

- Mohammad Saifuddin

Foreign direct signings:

- Alex Hales
- Khushdil Shah
- Allah Ghazanfar
- Steven Taylor
- Saurabh Netravalkar

== Retained players ==
This is the list of players that were retained by team.

=== Fortune Barishal ===
- Tamim Iqbal Khan
- Mahmudullah Riyad

=== Sylhet Strikers ===
- Tanzim Hasan Sakib
- Zakir Hasan

=== Khulna Tigers ===
- Afif Hossain
- Nasum Ahmed

=== Rangpur Riders ===
- Nurul Hasan Sohan
- Mahedi Hasan

== See also ==
- Chittagong Kings in 2025 BPL
- Dhaka Capitals in 2025 BPL
- Durbar Rajshahi in 2025 BPL
- Fortune Barishal in 2025 BPL
- Khulna Tigers in 2025 BPL
- Rangpur Riders in 2025 BPL
- Sylhet Strikers in 2025 BPL
