= 2025 Bangladesh Premier League final =

Final match of the BPL 2025

2025 Bangladesh Premier League Final
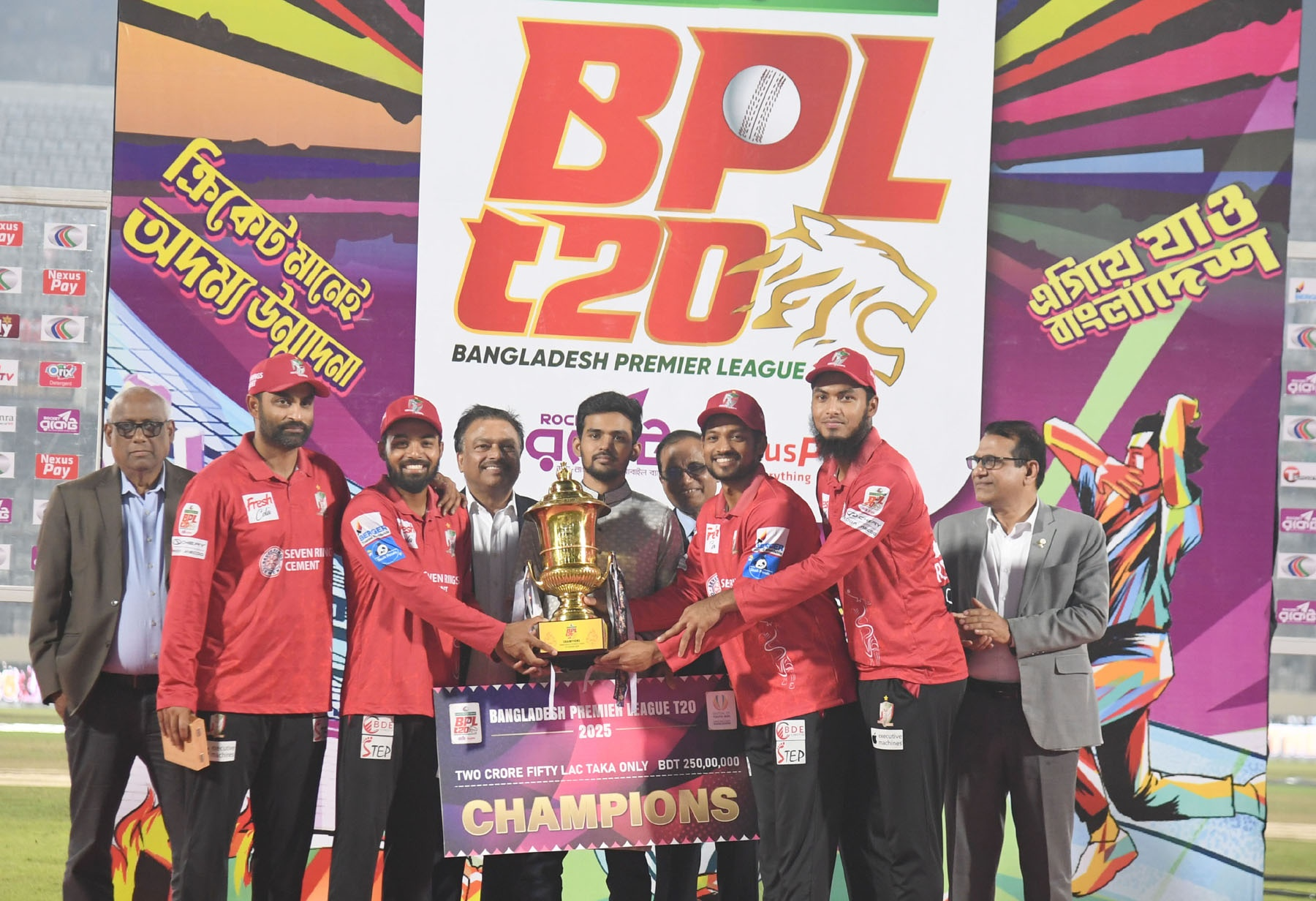
- Fortune Barishal collecting the trophy
- Event: 2025 Bangladesh Premier League
Fortune Barishal	Chittagong Kings
195/7	194/3
19.3 overs	20 overs
- Fortune Barishal won by 3 wickets
- Date: 7 February 2025
- Venue: Sher-e-Bangla National Cricket Stadium, Dhaka
- Player of the match: Tamim Iqbal (Fortune Barishal)
- Umpires: Masudur Rahman (Ban) and Gazi Sohel (Ban)

The 2025 Bangladesh Premier League final was played on 7 February 2025 at Sher-e-Bangla National Cricket Stadium in Dhaka. Fortune Barishal became the first team to qualify for the final by winning the Qualifier 1 against Chittagong Kings on 3 February 2025. They faced Chittagong Kings in the final, Chittagong having defeated Khulna Tigers in the Qualifier 2 by two wickets. Fortune Barishal defeated Chittagong by three wickets to win their second consecutive BPL title.

== Road to the final ==
Fortune Barishal performed well throughout the league stage losing just three of their 12 games and finished the league stage at the top of the table. They defeated Chittagong Kings in the Qualifier 1 to reach the final.

Chittagong Kings finished second in the league stage, winning eight of their 12 games. They lost Qualifier 1 to Barishal, and before defeating Khulna Tigers in Qualifier 2 to reach the final.

=== Win-loss table ===
Team	1	2	3	4	5	6	7	8	9	10	11	12	Q1	El	Q2
Fortune Barishal	Rajshahi; 4 wickets	Rangpur; 8 wickets	Rajshahi; 7 wickets	Sylhet; 7 wickets	Rangpur; 3 wickets	Dhaka; 8 wickets	Chittagong; 6 wickets	Khulna; 7 runs	Sylhet; 8 wickets	Khulna; 5 wickets	Dhaka; 9 wickets	Chittagong; 24 runs	Chittagong; 9 wickets	—N/a	
Chittagong Kings	Khulna; 37 runs	Rajshahi; 105 runs	Dhaka; 7 wickets	Sylhet; 30 runs	Khulna; 45 runs	Rangpur; 33 runs	Barisal; 6 wickets	Rajshahi; 111 runs	Dhaka; 9 wickets	Rangpur; 5 wickets	Syhlet; 96 runs	Barisal; 24 runs	Barisal; 9 wickets	—N/a	Khulna; 2 wickets

Team's results→	Won	Tied	Lost	N/R

=== Play-offs ===
Qualifier 1
3 February 2025 — Dhaka
1	Fortune Barishal	150/1 (17.2 overs)
2	Chittagong Kings	149/9 (20 overs)
Eliminator
3 February 2025 — Dhaka
3	Rangpur Riders	85 (16.5 overs)
4	Khulna Tigers	89/1 (10.2 overs)

Qualifier 2
5 February 2024 — Dhaka
Q1L	Chittagong Kings	164/8 (20 overs)
EW	Khulna Tigers	163/6 (20 overs)

Final
7 February 2024 — Dhaka
Q1W	Fortune Barishal	195/7 (19.3 overs)
Q2W	Chittagong Kings	194/3 (20 overs)

== Final ==
Match 46
7 February 2025
19:00 (N)
Scorecard

Chittagong Kings; 194/3 (20 overs)	v	Fortune Barishal; 195/7 (19.3 overs)
Parvez Hossain Emon 78* (49); Mohammad Ali 1/21 (4 overs)		Tamim Iqbal 54 (29); Shoriful Islam 4/34 (4 overs)

Fortune Barishal won by 3 wickets
Sher-e-Bangla National Cricket Stadium, Dhaka
Umpires: Masudur Rahman (Ban) and Gazi Sohel (Ban)
Player of the match: Tamim Iqbal (Fortune Barishal)

- Fortune Barishal won the toss and elected to field.
- Mushfiqur Rahim (Fortune Barishal) scored his 6,000th run in T20s.

=== Scorecard ===
Source:ESPNcricinfo

- Toss: Fortune Barishal won the toss and elected to field.

1st innings

Chittagong Kings innings
Player	Status	Runs	Balls	4s	6s	Strike rate
Khawaja Nafay	c †Rahim b Hossain	66	44	7	3	150.00
Parvez Hossain Emon	not out	78	44	6	4	159.18
Graham Clark	run out (Nabi/† Rahim)	44	23	2	3	191.30
Shamim Hossain	c Hridoy b Ali	2	2	0	0	100
Hussain Talat	not out	0	2	0	0	0.00
Mohammad Mithun						
Binura Fernando						
Arafat Sunny						
Shoriful Islam						
Khaled Ahmed						
Naeem Islam						
Extras (b 1, lb 2, w 1); Total 194/3 (20 overs)				15	10	9.70 RR

Fall of wickets: 1-121 (Khawaja, 12.4 ov), 2-191 (Graham, 19.2 ov), 3-193 (Shamim, 19.4 ov)

Fortune Barishal bowling
Bowler	Overs	Maidens	Runs	Wickets	Econ	Wides	NBs
Kyle Mayers	4	0	35	0	8.75	1	0
Mohammad Ali	4	0	21	1	5.25	0	0
Tanvir Islam	2	0	40	0	20.0	0	0
Ebadot Hossain	4	0	35	1	8.75	0	0
Mohammad Nabi	4	0	34	0	8.50	0	0
Rishad Hossain	2	0	26	0	13.00	0	0

2nd innings

Fortune Barishal innings
Player	Status	Runs	Balls	4s	6s	Strike rate
Tamim Iqbal	c Ahmed b Islam	54	29	9	1	186.20
Towhid Hridoy	c Sunny b Islam	32	28	3	0	114.28
Dawid Malan	lbw b Islam	1	2	0	0	50
Kyle Mayers	c sub (M. Ayub) b Islam	46	28	3	3	164.28
Mushfiqur Rahim	c Nafay b Islam	16	9	3	0	177.77
Mahmudullah	c Mithun b Islam	7	11	0	0	63.63
Mohammad Nabi	c K. Ahmed b Fernando	4	4	0	0	100.00
Rishad Hossain	not out	18	6	0	2	300.00
Tanvir Islam	not out	0	1	0	0	0.00
Ebadot Hossain						
Mohammad Ali						
Extras (b8, lb 1, w 7); Total 195/7 (19.3 overs)				18	6	10 RR

Fall of wickets: 1-76 (Tamim, 8.1 ov), 2-78 (Dawid, 8.4 ov), 3-96 (Towhid, 10.2 ov), 4-130 (Mushfiqur, 12.4 ov), 5-172 (Kyle, 17.3 ov), 6-173 (Mahmudullah, 17.5 ov), 7-187 (Nabi, 18.6 ov)

Chittagong Kings bowling
Bowler	Overs	Maidens	Runs	Wickets	Econ	Wides	NBs
Binura Fernando	4	0	42	1	10.50	2	0
Arafat Sunny	2	0	19	0	9.50	0	0
Shoriful Islam	4	0	34	4	8.50	2	0
Khaled Ahmed	4	0	29	0	7.25	2	0
Hussain Talat	3.3	0	44	0	12.57	1	1
Naeem Islam	2	0	18	0	9.00	0	0
