= 2025 Sylhet Strikers season =

Bangladesh cricket team season

Sylhet Strikers
2025 season
- Coach: AKM Mahmud Emon
- Captain: Ariful Haque
- Ground(s): Sylhet International Cricket Stadium, Sylhet
- BPL League: 7th
- Most runs: Zakir Hasan (389)
- Most wickets: Tanzim Hasan Sakib (16)

The 2025 season is the 10th season for the Bangladesh Premier League franchise Sylhet Strikers. They were one of the seven teams that participated in the tournament. They are yet to win the title and were runners-up only once in the 2023 season. This franchise is owned by Future Sports Bangladesh.

== Squad ==
Name	Nationality	Batting style	Bowling style	Notes
Batters
George Munsey	Scotland	Left-handed	Right-arm medium-fast	Overseas player
Aaron Jones	United States	Right-handed	Right-arm leg break	Overseas player
Zawad Abrar	Bangladesh	Right-handed	Right-arm off break	
Wicket-keepers
Rony Talukder	Bangladesh	Right-handed	–	
Zakir Hasan	Bangladesh	Left-handed	–	
Jaker Ali	Bangladesh	Right-handed	–	
All-rounders
Paul Stirling	Ireland	Right-handed	Right-arm off-break	Overseas player
Rahkeem Cornwall	West Indies	Right-handed	Right-arm off-break	Overseas player
Nahidul Islam	Bangladesh	Right-handed	Right-arm off-break	
Kadeem Alleyne	West Indies	Right-handed	Right-arm medium	Overseas player
Ahsan Hafeez	Pakistan	Left-handed	Slow left-arm orthodox	Overseas player
Tipu Sultan	Bangladesh	Left-handed	Slow left-arm orthodox	
Samiullah Shinwari	Afghanistan	Right-handed	Right-arm leg-break	Overseas player
Ariful Haque	Bangladesh	Right-handed	Right-arm fast medium	Captain
Pace bowlers
Tanzim Hasan Sakib	Bangladesh	Right-handed	Right-arm fast medium	
Reece Topley	England	Right-handed	Left-arm fast medium	Overseas player
Al-Amin Hossain	Bangladesh	Right-handed	Right-arm fast medium	
Sumon Khan	Bangladesh	Left-handed	Right-arm fast medium	
Ruyel Miah	Bangladesh	Left-handed	Left-arm fast medium	
Spin bowlers
Nihaduzzaman	Bangladesh	Right-handed	Slow left-arm orthodox	
Jon-Russ Jaggesar	West Indies	Right-handed	Right-arm off-break	Overseas player
Mehedi Hasan Sohag	Bangladesh	Right-handed	Right-arm leg break	

== Coaching Panel ==
Position	Name
Head coach	AKM Mahmud Emon
Assistant coach	Syed Rasel
Batting coach	Tushar Imran
Bowling coach	Dolar Mahmud
Fielding coach	Murad Khan

== League stage ==
=== Points Table ===
Pos	Team	Pld	W	L	NR	Pts	NRR	Qualification
1	Fortune Barishal (C)	12	9	3	0	18	1.302	Advanced to Qualifier 1
2	Chittagong Kings (R)	12	8	4	0	16	1.395	Advanced to Qualifier 1
3	Rangpur Riders (4th)	12	8	4	0	16	0.596	Advanced to Eliminator
4	Khulna Tigers (3rd)	12	6	6	0	12	0.184	Advanced to Eliminator
5	Durbar Rajshahi	12	6	6	0	12	−1.030	
6	Dhaka Capitals	12	3	9	0	6	−0.779	
7	Sylhet Strikers	12	2	10	0	4	−1.340	

Source: ESPNcricinfo & Cricbuzz
(C) Champions; (R) Runners-up

=== Win-loss table ===
Team	1	2	3	4	5	6	7	8	9	10	11	12	Q1	El	Q2	F	Pos.
Sylhet Strikers	Rajshahi; 34 runs	Rajshahi; 8 wickets	Barishal; 7 wickets	Dhaka; 3 wickets	Khulna; 8 runs	Chittagong; 30 runs	Rajshahi; 65 runs	Dhaka; 6 runs	Khulna; 6 wickets	Barishal; 8 wickets	Rajshahi; 5 wickets	Chittagong; 96 runs	—N/a				7th

Team's results→	Won	Tied	Lost	N/R

=== Matches ===
Match 4
31 December 2024
17:00 (N)
Scorecard

Rangpur Riders; 155/6 (20 overs)	v	Sylhet Strikers; 121/9 (20 overs)
Iftikhar Ahmed 47* (42); Tanzim Hasan Sakib 2/27 (4 overs)		Rony Talukdar 41 (36); Nahid Rana 4/27 (4 overs)

Rangpur Riders won by 34 runs
Sher-e-Bangla National Cricket Stadium, Dhaka
Umpires: Gazi Sohel (Ban) and Asif Yaqoob (Pak)
Player of the match: Nahid Rana (Rangpur Riders)

- Rangpur Riders won the toss and elected to field.

Match 9
6 January 2025
13:30
Scorecard

Sylhet Strikers; 205/4 (20 overs)	v	Rangpur Riders; 210/2 (19 overs)
Rony Talukdar 54 (32); Mohammad Saifuddin 2/31 (4 overs)		Alex Hales 113* (56); Tanzim Hasan Sakib 2/23 (4 overs)

Rangpur Riders won by 8 wickets
Sylhet International Cricket Stadium, Sylhet
Umpires: Moniruzzaman (Ban) and Asif Yaqoob (Pak)
Player of the match: Alex Hales (Rangpur Riders)

- Rangpur Riders won the toss and elected to field.

Match 12
7 January 2025
18:30 (N)
Scorecard

Sylhet Strikers; 125 (18.2 overs)	v	Fortune Barishal; 126/3 (10.3 overs)
Ariful Haque 36 (29); Rishad Hossain 3/15 (4 overs)		Kyle Mayers 59* (31); Tanzim Hasan Sakib 2/37 (3.3 overs)

Fortune Barishal won by 7 wickets
Sylhet International Cricket Stadium, Sylhet
Umpires: Morshed Ali Khan (Ban) and Asif Yaqoob (Pak)
Player of the match: Jahandad Khan (Fortune Barishal)

- Fortune Barishal won the toss and elected to field.

Match 16
10 January 2025
19:00 (N)
Scorecard

Dhaka Capitals; 193/6 (20 overs)	v	Sylhet Strikers; 195/7 (18.4 overs)
Litton Das 73 (43); Rahkeem Cornwall 3/27 (4 overs)		Zakir Hasan 58 (27); Farmanullah 2/37 (4 overs)

Sylhet Strikers won by 3 wickets
Sylhet International Cricket Stadium, Sylhet
Umpires: Asif Yaqoob (Pak) and Masudur Rahman (Ban)
Player of the match: Zakir Hasan (Sylhet Strikers)

- Dhaka Capitals won the toss and elected to bat.

Match 17
12 January 2025
13:30
Scorecard

Sylhet Strikers; 182/5 (20 overs)	v	Khulna Tigers; 174/9 (20 overs)
Zakir Hasan 75* (46); Abu Hider Rony 2/25 (4 overs)		Will Bosisto 43 (40); Ruyel Miah 2/28 (4 overs)

Sylhet Strikers won by 8 runs
Sylhet International Cricket Stadium, Sylhet
Umpires: Raveendra Wimalasiri (SL) and Gazi Sohel (Ban)
Player of the match: Zakir Hasan (Sylhet Strikers)

- Khulna Tigers won the toss and elected to field.

Match 19
13 January 2025
13:30
Scorecard

Chittagong Kings; 203/6 (20 overs)	v	Sylhet Strikers; 173/8 (20 overs)
Graham Clark 60 (33); Tanzim Hasan Sakib 2/38 (4 overs)		George Munsey 52 (37); Mohammad Wasim 3/25 (4 overs)

Chittagong Kings won by 30 runs
Sylhet International Cricket Stadium, Sylhet
Umpires: Asif Yaqoob (Pak) and Ali Arman (Ban)
Player of the match: Graham Clark (Chittagong Kings)

- Sylhet Strikers won the toss and elected to field.

Match 23
17 January 2025
14:00
Scorecard

Durbar Rajshahi; 184/7 (20 overs)	v	Sylhet Strikers; 119 (17.3 overs)
Ryan Burl 41 (27); Ruyel Miah 3/32 (4 overs)		Zakir Hasan 39 (28); Sunzamul Islam 3/25 (4 overs)

Durbar Rajshahi won by 65 runs
Zohur Ahmed Chowdhury Stadium, Chattogram
Umpires: Raveendra Wimalasiri (SL) and Ali Arman (Ban)
Player of the match: Sunzamul Islam (Durbar Rajshahi)

- Durbar Rajshahi won the toss and elected to bat.

Match 27
20 January 2025
13:30
Scorecard

Dhaka Capitals; 196/6 (20 overs)	v	Sylhet Strikers; 190/7 (20 overs)
Litton Das 70 (48); Tipu Sultan 2/26 (4 overs)		Rony Talukdar 68 (44); Thisara Perera 2/31 (4 overs)

Dhaka Capitals win by 6 runs
Zohur Ahmed Chowdhury Stadium, Chattogram
Umpires: Morshed Ali Khan (Ban) and Muhammad Kamruzzaman (Ban)
Player of the match: Thisara Perera (Dhaka Capitals)

- Dhaka Capitals won the toss and elected to bat.

Match 32
23 January 2025
18:30 (N)
Scorecard

Sylhet Strikers; 152/9 (20 overs)	v	Khulna Tigers; 156/4 (19.5 overs)
George Munsey 58 (32); Salman Irshad 2/24 (4 overs)		Mehidy Hasan Miraz 70 (50); Nihaduzzaman 2/25 (4 overs)

Khulna Tigers won by 6 wickets
Zohur Ahmed Chowdhury Stadium, Chattogram
Umpires: Masudur Rahman (Ban) and Tanvir Ahmed (Ban)
Player of the match: Mehidy Hasan Miraz (Khulna Tigers)

- Sylhet Strikers won the toss and elected to bat.

Match 33
26 January 2025
13:30
Scorecard

Sylhet Strikers; 116 (18.1 overs)	v	Fortune Barishal; 120/2 (16 overs)
Ahsan Hafeez 28 (29); Faheem Ashraf 5/7 (3.1 overs)		Tamim Iqbal 52* (51); Sumon Khan 1/17 (3 overs)

Fortune Barishal won by 8 wickets
Sher-e-Bangla National Cricket Stadium, Dhaka
Umpires: Tanvir Ahmed (Ban) and Raveendra Wimalasiri (SL)
Player of the match: Faheem Ashraf (Fortune Barishal)

- Sylhet Strikers won the toss and elected to bat.

Match 36
27 January 2025
18:30 (N)
Scorecard

Sylhet Strikers; 117/9 (20 overs)	v	Durbar Rajshahi; 121/5 (16.5 overs)
Ahsan Hafeez 25 (21); SM Meherob 4/15 (4 overs)		Ryan Burl 48 (34); Tanzim Hasan Sakib 2/17 (4 overs)

Durbar Rajshahi won by 5 wickets
Sher-e-Bangla National Cricket Stadium, Dhaka
Umpires: Sajidul Islam (Ban) and Asif Yaqoob (Pak)
Player of the match: SM Meherob (Durbar Rajshahi)

- Durbar Rajshahi won the toss and elected to field.

Match 40
30 January 2025
18:30 (N)
Scorecard

Chittagong Kings; 196/8 (20 overs)	v	Sylhet Strikers; 100 (15.2 overs)
Khawaja Nafay 52 (30); Tanzim Hasan Sakib 3/37 (4 overs)		Zakir Hasan 19 (12); Shoriful Islam 4/5 (3.2 overs)

Chittagong Kings won by 96 runs
Sher-e-Bangla National Cricket Stadium, Dhaka
Umpires: Morshed Ali Khan (Ban) and Gazi Sohel (Ban)
Player of the match: Shoriful Islam (Chittagong Kings)

- Sylhet Strikers won the toss and elected to field.
