= 2025 Durbar Rajshahi season =

Bangladesh Premier League team season

Durbar Rajshahi
2025 season
- Coach: Ijaz Ahmed
- Captain: Anamul Haque
- BPL League: 5th
- Most runs: Anamul Haque (392)
- Most wickets: Taskin Ahmed (25)

The 2025 season was the seventh season for the Bangladesh Premier League franchise, Durbar Rajshahi. They last participated in the 2019-20 season as Rajshahi Royals and became the champion, beating Khulna Tigers in the final. In 2024, the team was acquired by Valentine Group and renamed.

== Squad ==
Name	Nationality	Batting style	Bowling style	Notes
Batters
Yasir Ali	Bangladesh	Right-	Right-arm off-break	
Mizanur Rahman	Bangladesh	Right-handed	Right-arm off-break	
Wicket-keepers
Anamul Haque Bijoy	Bangladesh	Right-handed		Vice-captain
Akbar Ali	Bangladesh	Right-handed	–	
Tawaf Mashrafee Nawaz	Bangladesh	Right-handed	–	
Zahiduzzaman	Bangladesh	Left-handed	–	
Mohammad Haris	Pakistan	Right-handed	Right-arm off break	Overseas player
All rounders
SM Meherob	Bangladesh	Left-handed	Right-arm off-break	
~~Saad Nasim~~	Pakistan	Right-handed	Right-arm leg-break	Overseas player
Lahiru Samarakoon	Sri Lanka	Left-handed	Right-arm fast medium	Overseas player
Sabbir Hossain	Bangladesh	Right-handed	Right-arm fast medium	
~~Ravi Bopara~~	England	Right-handed	Right-arm fast medium	Overseas player
~~Nathan Edward~~	West Indies	Left-handed	Left-arm fast medium	Overseas player
Jishan Alam	Bangladesh	Right-handed	Right-arm off break	
Sohag Gazi	Bangladesh	Right-handed	Right-arm off break	
~~Samit Patel~~	England	Right-handed	Slow left-arm orthodox	Overseas player
Aftab Alam	Afghanistan	Right-handed	Right-arm fast	Overseas player
Ryan Burl	Zimbabwe	Left-handed	Right-arm leg-break	Overseas player
~~Arafat Minhas~~	Pakistan	Left-handed	Slow left-arm orthodox	Overseas player
Spin bowlers
Sunzamul Islam	Bangladesh	Left-handed	Slow left-arm orthodox	
Mark Deyal	West Indies	Left-handed	Right-arm off-break	Overseas player
Hasan Murad	Bangladesh	Right-handed	Slow left-arm orthodox	
Pace bowlers
Taskin Ahmed	Bangladesh	Left-handed	Right-arm fast medium	Captain
Mrittunjoy Chowdhury	Bangladesh	Left-handed	Left-arm fast medium	
~~Miguel Cummins~~	West Indies	Left-handed	Right-arm fast	Overseas player
Mohor Sheikh	Bangladesh	Right-handed	Right-arm fast medium	
~~Bilal Khan~~	Oman	Left-handed	Left-arm fast medium	Overseas player
~~Salman Mirza~~	Pakistan	Right-handed	Left-arm fast	Overseas player
Shafiul Islam	Bangladesh	Right-handed	Right-arm fast medium	
Asaduzzaman Payel	Bangladesh	Right-handed	Right-arm fast medium	

== Coaching staff ==
Position	Name
Head coach	Ijaz Ahmed
Assistant coach	Iftikhar Anjum
Team manager	Mehrab Hossain

== League stage ==
=== Points Table ===
Pos	Team	Pld	W	L	NR	Pts	NRR	Qualification
1	Fortune Barishal (C)	12	9	3	0	18	1.302	Advanced to Qualifier 1
2	Chittagong Kings (R)	12	8	4	0	16	1.395	Advanced to Qualifier 1
3	Rangpur Riders (4th)	12	8	4	0	16	0.596	Advanced to Eliminator
4	Khulna Tigers (3rd)	12	6	6	0	12	0.184	Advanced to Eliminator
5	Durbar Rajshahi	12	6	6	0	12	−1.030	
6	Dhaka Capitals	12	3	9	0	6	−0.779	
7	Sylhet Strikers	12	2	10	0	4	−1.340	

Source: ESPNcricinfo & Cricbuzz
(C) Champions; (R) Runners-up

=== Win-loss table ===
Team	1	2	3	4	5	6	7	8	9	10	11	12	Q1	El	Q2	F	Pos.
Durbar Rajshahi	Barishal; 4 wickets	Dhaka; 7 wickets	Chittagong; 105 runs	Barishal; 7 wickets	Khulna; 28 runs	Dhaka; 149 runs	Sylhet; 65 runs	Khulna; 7 runs	Chittagong; 111 runs	Rangpur; 24 runs	Rangpur; 2 runs	Sylhet; 5 wickets	—N/a				5th

Team's results→	Won	Tied	Lost	N/R

=== Matches ===
Match 1
30 December 2024
13:30
Scorecard

Durbar Rajshahi; 197/3 (20 overs)	v	Fortune Barishal; 200/6 (18.1 overs)
Yasir Ali 94* (47); Kyle Mayers 2/13 (3 overs)		Mahmudullah 56* (26); Taskin Ahmed 3/31 (4 overs)

Fortune Barishal won by 4 wickets
Sher-e-Bangla National Cricket Stadium, Dhaka
Umpires: Masudur Rahman (Ban) and Asif Yaqoob (Pak)
Player of the match: Mahmudullah (Fortune Barishal)

- Fortune Barishal won the toss and elected to field.
- Yasir Ali (Durbar Rajshahi) scored his 2,000th run in T20s.

Match 5
2 January 2025
13:30
Scorecard

Dhaka Capitals; 174/9 (20 overs)	v	Durbar Rajshahi; 179/3 (18.1 overs)
Shahadat Hossain 50 (41); Taskin Ahmed 7/19 (3 overs)		Anamul Haque 73* (46); Mustafizur Rahman 1/33 (4 overs)

Durbar Rajshahi won by 7 wickets
Sher-e-Bangla National Cricket Stadium, Dhaka
Umpires: Mahfuzur Rahman (Ban) and Raveendra Wimalasiri (SL)
Player of the match: Taskin Ahmed (Durbar Rajshahi)

- Dhaka Capitals won the toss and elected to bat.
- Taskin Ahmed (Durbar Rajshahi) took the best bowling figures in the BPL.

Match 7
3 January 2025
14:00
Scorecard

Chittagong Kings; 219/5 (20 overs)	v	Durbar Rajshahi; 114 (17.1 overs)
Usman Khan 123 (62); Taskin Ahmed 2/22 (4 overs)		Mohammad Haris 32 (15); Aliss Islam 3/17 (4 overs)

Chittagong Kings won by 105 runs
Sher-e-Bangla National Cricket Stadium, Dhaka
Umpires: Asif Yaqoob (Pak) and Muhammad Kamruzzaman (Ban)
Player of the match: Usman Khan (Chittagong Kings)

- Durbar Rajshahi won the toss and elected to field.

Match 10
6 January 2025
18:30 (N)
Scorecard

Durbar Rajshahi; 168/4 (20 overs)	v	Fortune Barishal; 169/3 (17.3 overs)
Anamul Haque 39 (35); Shaheen Afridi 2/20 (4 overs)		Tamim Iqbal 86* (48); Mohor Sheikh 2/32 (2 overs)

Fortune Barishal won by 7 wickets.
Sylhet International Cricket Stadium, Sylhet
Umpires: Mahfuzur Rahman (Ban) and Raveendra Wimalasiri (SL)
Player of the match: Tamim Iqbal (Fortune Barishal)

- Fortune Barishal won the toss and elected to field.

Match 15
10 January 2025
14:00
Scorecard

Durbar Rajshahi; 178/5 (20 overs)	v	Khulna Tigers; 150 (19.3 overs)
Ryan Burl 48* (29); Nasum Ahmed 2/20 (3 overs)		Afif Hossain 33 (30); Ryan Burl 2/13 (2 overs)

Durbar Rajshahi won by 28 runs
Sylhet International Cricket Stadium, Sylhet
Umpires: Raveendra Wimalasiri (SL) and Tanvir Ahmed (Ban)
Player of the match: Ryan Burl (Durbar Rajshahi)

- Khulna Tigers won the toss and elected to field.

Match 18
12 January 2025
18:30 (N)
Scorecard

Dhaka Capitals; 254/1 (20 overs)	v	Durbar Rajshahi; 105 (15.2 overs)
Litton Das 125* (55); Shafiul Islam 1/62 (4 overs)		Ryan Burl 47* (32); Abu Jayed 2/15 (3 overs)

Dhaka Capitals won by 149 runs
Sylhet International Cricket Stadium, Sylhet
Umpires: Asif Yaqoob (Pak) and Morshed Ali Khan (Ban)
Player of the match: Litton Das (Dhaka Capitals)

- Durbar Rajshahi won the toss and elected to field.

Match 23
17 January 2025
14:00
Scorecard

Durbar Rajshahi; 184/7 (20 overs)	v	Sylhet Strikers; 119 (17.3 overs)
Ryan Burl 41 (27); Ruyel Miah 3/32 (4 overs)		Zakir Hasan 39 (28); Sunzamul Islam 3/25 (4 overs)

Durbar Rajshahi won by 65 runs
Zohur Ahmed Chowdhury Stadium, Chattogram
Umpires: Raveendra Wimalasiri (SL) and Ali Arman (Ban)
Player of the match: Sunzamul Islam (Durbar Rajshahi)

- Durbar Rajshahi won the toss and elected to bat.

Match 26
19 January 2025
18:30 (N)
Scorecard

Khulna Tigers; 209/4 (20 overs)	v	Durbar Rajshahi; 202/4 (20 overs)
Afif Hossain 56 (42); Taskin Ahmed 2/36 (4 overs)		Anamul Haque 100* (57); Hasan Mahmud 2/25 (4 overs)

Khulna Tigers won by 7 runs
Zohur Ahmed Chowdhury Stadium, Chattogram
Umpires: Asif Yaqoob (Pak) and Gazi Sohel (Ban)
Player of the match: Hasan Mahmud (Khulna Tigers)

- Khulna Tigers won the toss and elected to bat.

Match 28
20 January 2025
18:30 (N)
Scorecard

Chittagong Kings; 191/8 (20 overs)	v	Durbar Rajshahi; 80 (14.2 overs)
Naeem Islam 56 (41); Taskin Ahmed 2/23 (4 overs)		Anamul Haque 21 (21); Naeem Islam 2/6 (3 overs)

Chittagong Kings won by 111 runs
Zohur Ahmed Chowdhury Stadium, Chattogram
Umpires: Masudur Rahman (Ban) and Gazi Sohel (Ban)
Player of the match: Naeem Islam (Chittagong Kings)

- Durbar Rajshahi won the toss and elected to field.

Match 31
23 January 2025
13:30
Scorecard

Durbar Rajshahi; 170/9 (20 overs)	v	Rangpur Riders; 146 (19.2 overs)
Yasir Ali 60 (32); Akif Javed 3/23 (4 overs)		Saif Hassan 43 (29); Ryan Burl 4/22 (4 overs)

Durbar Rajshahi won by 24 runs
Zohur Ahmed Chowdhury Stadium, Chattogram
Umpires: Morshed Ali Khan (Ban) and Gazi Sohel (Ban)
Player of the match: Ryan Burl (Durbar Rajshahi)

- Rangpur Riders won the toss and elected to field.

Match 34
26 January 2025
18:30 (N)
Scorecard

Durbar Rajshahi; 119/9 (20 overs)	v	Rangpur Riders; 117/8 (20 overs)
Sunzamul Islam 28* (29); Khushdil Shah 3/19 (4 overs)		Mohammad Saifuddin 52* (31); Mrittunjoy Chowdhury 4/18 (4 overs)

Durbar Rajshahi won by 2 runs
Sher-e-Bangla National Cricket Stadium, Dhaka
Umpires: Muhammad Kamruzzaman (Ban) and Sharfuddoula (Ban)
Player of the match: Mrittunjoy Chowdhury (Durbar Rajshahi)

- Rangpur Riders won the toss and elected to field.
- Soumya Sarkar (Rangpur Riders) played his 100th BPL match.

Match 36
27 January 2025
18:30 (N)
Scorecard

Sylhet Strikers; 117/9 (20 overs)	v	Durbar Rajshahi; 121/5 (16.5 overs)
Ahsan Hafeez 25 (21); SM Meherob 4/15 (4 overs)		Ryan Burl 48 (34); Tanzim Hasan Sakib 2/17 (4 overs)

Durbar Rajshahi won by 5 wickets
Sher-e-Bangla National Cricket Stadium, Dhaka
Umpires: Sajidul Islam (Ban) and Asif Yaqoob (Pak)
Player of the match: SM Meherob (Durbar Rajshahi)

- Durbar Rajshahi won the toss and elected to field.

== Controversies ==
The overseas players of Durbar Rajshahi did not take the field against Rangpur Riders on 26 January 2025 due to non-payment of dues. Judging the condition, BCB overturned the rule requiring a minimum of two foreign players in the playing XI and granted permission to Durbar Rajshahi to field a team comprising 11 local players for one match. However, they won the match without any overseas players.
