= 2025 Fortune Barishal season =

Bangladesh Premier League team season

Fortune Barishal
2025 season
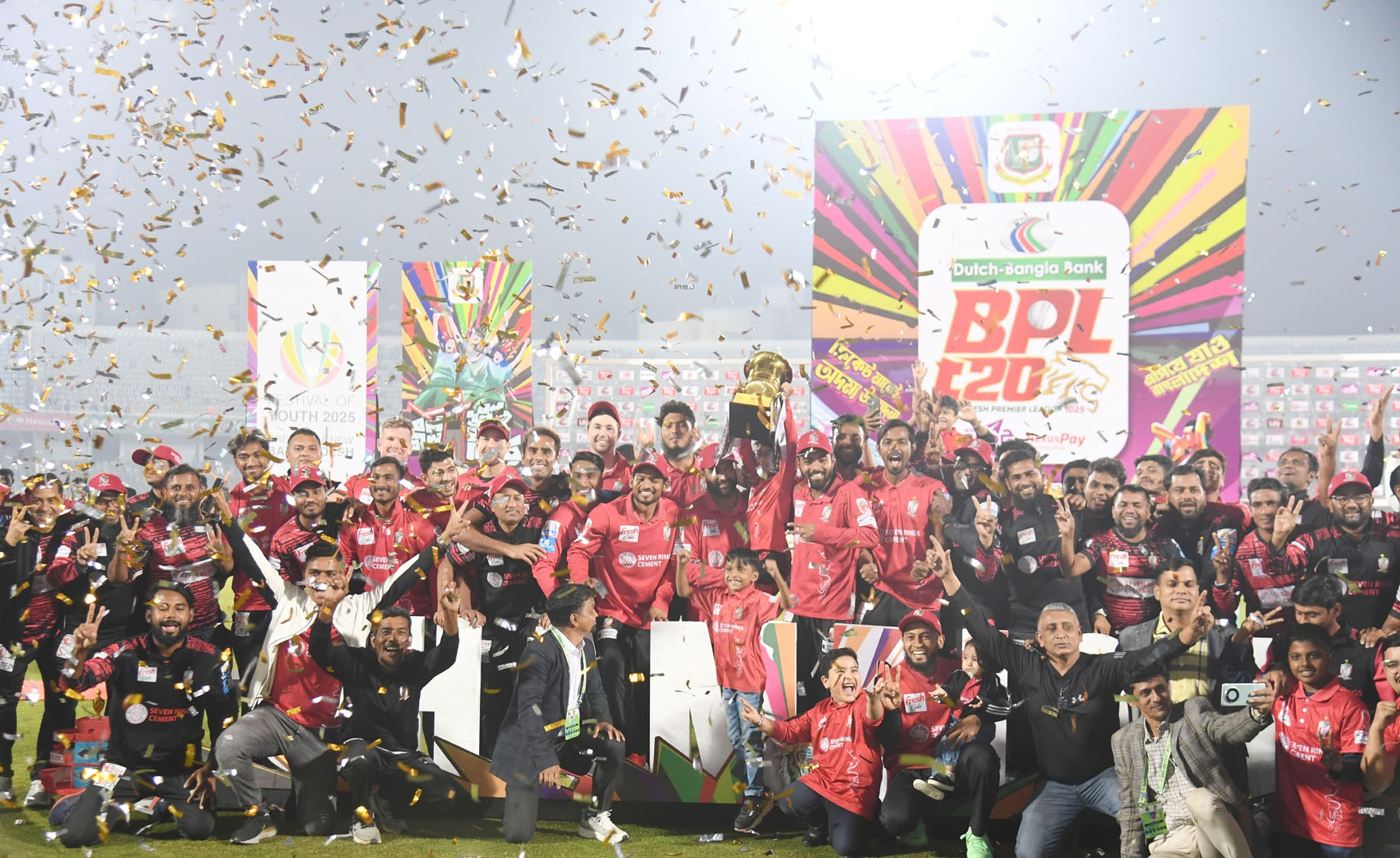
- Fortune Barishal were the champions of BPL-2025
- Coach: Mizanur Rahman Babul
- Captain: Tamim Iqbal
- Ground(s): Barisal Divisional Stadium, Barishal
- BPL League: Champions

The 2025 season was the eighth season for the Bangladesh Premier League franchise, Fortune Barishal. They were one of seven teams which participated in the tournament. They were the defending champions.

== Season summary ==
Fortune Barishal performed well throughout the league stage of BPL 2025 lossing just 3 of their 12 games and finished the league stage as the table topper. They have also defeated Chittagong Kings in the Qualifier 1 to reach the final. They will face the winner of the Qualifier 2 on 7 February 2025 in the grand final.

== Squad ==
Name	Nationality	Batting style	Bowling style	Notes
Batters
Tamim Iqbal	Bangladesh	Left-handed	Right-arm off break	Captain
Dawid Malan	England	Left-handed	Right-arm leg-break	Overseas player
Towhid Hridoy	Bangladesh	Right-handed	Right-arm off break	
Nazmul Hossain Shanto	Bangladesh	Left-handed	Right-arm off break	
Pathum Nissanka	Sri Lanka	Right-handed	Right-arm leg-break	Overseas player
Ariful Islam	Bangladesh	Left-handed	Slow left-arm orthodox	
Wicket-keepers
Mushfiqur Rahim	Bangladesh	Right-handed	–	
Pritom Kumar	Bangladesh	Right-handed	–	
All-rounders
Mahmudullah Riad	Bangladesh	Right-handed	Right-arm off break	
James Neesham	New Zealand	Left-handed	Right-arm fast medium	Overseas player
Rishad Hossain	Bangladesh	Right-handed	Right-arm leg break	
Mohammad Nabi	Afghanistan	Right-handed	Right-arm off break	Overseas player
James Fuller	England	Right-handed	Right arm medium fast	Overseas player
Jahandad Khan	Pakistan	Left-handed	Left arm medium fast	Overseas player
Faheem Ashraf	Pakistan	Left-handed	Right arm medium fast	Overseas player
Kyle Mayers	West Indies	Left-handed	Right-arm medium	Overseas player
~~Nandre Burger~~	South Africa	Left-handed	Left-arm fast	Overseas player
Pace bowlers
Ripon Mondol	Bangladesh	Right-handed	Right-arm medium	
Ebadot Hossain	Bangladesh	Right-handed	Right-arm medium	
Shaheen Afridi	Pakistan	Right handed	Left-arm medium	Overseas player
Mohammad Imran	Pakistan	Right handed	Left-arm medium-fast	Overseas player
Shohidul Islam	Bangladesh	Right-handed	Right-arm medium	
Iqbal Hossain Emon	Bangladesh	Right-handed	Right-arm medium	
Mohammad Ali	Pakistan	Right handed	Right-arm medium	Overseas player
~~Adam Milne~~	New Zealand	Right-handed	Right-arm fast	Overseas player
Spin bowlers
Tanvir Islam	Bangladesh	Left-handed	Slow left-arm orthodox	
~~Noor Ahmad~~	Afghanistan	Right handed	Left-arm unorthodox spin	Overseas player
Taijul Islam	Bangladesh	Left-handed	Slow left-arm orthodox	
Nayeem Hasan	Bangladesh	Right-handed	Right-arm off break	

== Coaching staff ==
Position	Name
Head coach	Mizanur Rahman Babul
Assistant coach	Humayun Kabir
Manager	Sabbir Khan
Batting coach	Nafees Iqbal
Fielding coach	Shahin Hossain

== League stage ==
=== Points Table ===
Pos	Team	Pld	W	L	NR	Pts	NRR	Qualification
1	Fortune Barishal (C)	12	9	3	0	18	1.302	Advanced to Qualifier 1
2	Chittagong Kings (R)	12	8	4	0	16	1.395	Advanced to Qualifier 1
3	Rangpur Riders (4th)	12	8	4	0	16	0.596	Advanced to Eliminator
4	Khulna Tigers (3rd)	12	6	6	0	12	0.184	Advanced to Eliminator
5	Durbar Rajshahi	12	6	6	0	12	−1.030	
6	Dhaka Capitals	12	3	9	0	6	−0.779	
7	Sylhet Strikers	12	2	10	0	4	−1.340	

Source: ESPNcricinfo & Cricbuzz
(C) Champions; (R) Runners-up

=== Win-loss table ===
Team	1	2	3	4	5	6	7	8	9	10	11	12	Q1	El	Q2	F	Pos.
Fortune Barishal	Rajshahi; 4 wickets	Rangpur; 8 wickets	Rajshahi; 7 wickets	Sylhet; 7 wickets	Rangpur; 3 wickets	Dhaka; 8 wickets	Chittagong; 6 wickets	Khulna; 7 runs	Sylhet; 8 wickets	Khulna; 5 wickets	Dhaka; 9 wickets	Chittagong; 24 runs	Chittagong; 9 wickets	—N/a		TBA ?	

Team's results→	Won	Tied	Lost	N/R

=== Matches ===
Match 1
30 December 2024
13:30
Scorecard

Durbar Rajshahi; 197/3 (20 overs)	v	Fortune Barishal; 200/6 (18.1 overs)
Yasir Ali 94* (47); Kyle Mayers 2/13 (3 overs)		Mahmudullah 56* (26); Taskin Ahmed 3/31 (4 overs)

Fortune Barishal won by 4 wickets
Sher-e-Bangla National Cricket Stadium, Dhaka
Umpires: Masudur Rahman (Ban) and Asif Yaqoob (Pak)
Player of the match: Mahmudullah (Fortune Barishal)

- Fortune Barishal won the toss and elected to field.
- Yasir Ali (Durbar Rajshahi) scored his 2,000th run in T20s.

Match 6
2 January 2025
18:30 (N)
Scorecard

Fortune Barishal; 124 (18.2 overs)	v	Rangpur Riders; 128/2 (15 overs)
Tamim Iqbal 28 (18); Khushdil Shah 3/18 (4 overs)		Saif Hassan 62* (46); Iqbal Hossain Emon 2/41 (3 overs)

Rangpur Riders won by 8 wickets.
Sher-e-Bangla National Cricket Stadium, Dhaka
Umpires: Morshed Ali Khan (Ban) and Asif Yaqoob (Pak)
Player of the match: Saif Hassan (Rangpur Riders)

- Rangpur Riders won the toss and elected to field.

Match 10
6 January 2025
18:30 (N)
Scorecard

Durbar Rajshahi; 168/4 (20 overs)	v	Fortune Barishal; 169/3 (17.3 overs)
Anamul Haque 39 (35); Shaheen Afridi 2/20 (4 overs)		Tamim Iqbal 86* (48); Mohor Sheikh 2/32 (2 overs)

Fortune Barishal won by 7 wickets.
Sylhet International Cricket Stadium, Sylhet
Umpires: Mahfuzur Rahman (Ban) and Raveendra Wimalasiri (SL)
Player of the match: Tamim Iqbal (Fortune Barishal)

- Fortune Barishal won the toss and elected to field.

Match 12
7 January 2025
18:30 (N)
Scorecard

Sylhet Strikers; 125 (18.2 overs)	v	Fortune Barishal; 126/3 (10.3 overs)
Ariful Haque 36 (29); Rishad Hossain 3/15 (4 overs)		Kyle Mayers 59* (31); Tanzim Hasan Sakib 2/37 (3.3 overs)

Fortune Barishal won by 7 wickets
Sylhet International Cricket Stadium, Sylhet
Umpires: Morshed Ali Khan (Ban) and Asif Yaqoob (Pak)
Player of the match: Jahandad Khan (Fortune Barishal)

- Fortune Barishal won the toss and elected to field.

Match 13
9 January 2025
13:30
Scorecard

Fortune Barishal; 197/5 (20 overs)	v	Rangpur Riders; 202/7 (20 overs)
Kyle Mayers 61* (29); Kamrul Islam Rabbi 2/47 (3 overs)		Khushdil Shah 48 (24); Jahandad Khan 2/48 (4 overs)

Rangpur Riders won by 3 wickets
Sylhet International Cricket Stadium, Sylhet
Umpires: Ali Arman (Ban) and Asif Yaqoob (Pak)
Player of the match: Nurul Hasan Sohan (Rangpur Riders)

- Rangpur Riders won the toss and elected to field.

Match 21
16 January 2025
13:30
Scorecard

Dhaka Capitals; 139 (19.3 overs)	v	Fortune Barishal; 145/2 (16 overs)
Tanzid Hasan 62 (44); Tanvir Islam 3/39 (3 overs)		Tamim Iqbal 61 (48); Thisara Perera 1/25 (3 overs)

Fortune Barishal won by 8 wickets
Zohur Ahmed Chowdhury Stadium, Chattogram
Umpires: Asif Yaqoob (Pak) and Moniruzzaman (Ban)
Player of the match: Tamim Iqbal (Fortune Barishal)

- Dhaka Capitals won the toss and elected to bat.

Match 25
19 January 2025
13:30
Scorecard

Chittagong Kings; 121/8 (20 overs)	v	Fortune Barishal; 122/4 (16.5 overs)
Mohammad Mithun 35 (34); Faheem Ashraf 3/12 (4 overs)		Dawid Malan 56* (41); Khaled Ahmed 2/27 (3.5 overs)

Fortune Barishal won by 6 wickets
Zohur Ahmed Chowdhury Stadium, Chattogram
Umpires: Tanvir Ahmed (Ban) and Sharfuddoula (Ban)
Player of the match: Dawid Malan (Fortune Barishal)

- Fortune Barishal won the toss and elected to field.

Match 30
22 January 2025
18:30 (N)
Scorecard

Fortune Barishal; 167/9 (20 overs)	v	Khulna Tigers; 160/6 (20 overs)
Mahmudullah 50 (45); Mehidy Hasan Miraz 3/35 (4 overs)		Mohammad Naim 77 (59); Jahandad Khan 2/20 (4 overs)

Fortune Barishal won by 7 runs
Zohur Ahmed Chowdhury Stadium, Chattogram
Umpires: Sharfuddoula (Ban) and Morshed Ali Khan (Ban)
Player of the match: Rishad Hossain (Fortune Barishal)

- Khulna Tigers won the toss and elected to field.

Match 33
26 January 2025
13:30
Scorecard

Sylhet Strikers; 116 (18.1 overs)	v	Fortune Barishal; 120/2 (16 overs)
Ahsan Hafeez 28 (29); Faheem Ashraf 5/7 (3.1 overs)		Tamim Iqbal 52* (51); Sumon Khan 1/17 (3 overs)

Fortune Barishal won by 8 wickets
Sher-e-Bangla National Cricket Stadium, Dhaka
Umpires: Tanvir Ahmed (Ban) and Raveendra Wimalasiri (SL)
Player of the match: Faheem Ashraf (Fortune Barishal)

- Sylhet Strikers won the toss and elected to bat.

Match 35
27 January 2025
13:30
Scorecard

Khulna Tigers; 187/5 (20 overs)	v	Fortune Barishal; 188/5 (19.1 overs)
Mohammad Naim 51 (27); Faheem Ashraf 2/49 (4 overs)		Dawid Malan 63 (37); Abu Hider Rony 2/35 (2.4 overs)

Fortune Barishal won by 5 wickets
Sher-e-Bangla National Cricket Stadium, Dhaka
Umpires: Mahfuzur Rahman (Ban) and Sharfuddoula (Ban)
Player of the match: Dawid Malan (Fortune Barishal)

- Fortune Barishal won the toss and elected to field.

Match 38
29 January 2025
18:30 (N)
Scorecard

Dhaka Capitals; 73 (15.3 overs)	v	Fortune Barishal; 77/1 (6.3 overs)
Thisara Perera 15 (11); Tanvir Islam 3/2 (2 overs)		Dawid Malan 37* (16); Mustafizur Rahman 1/16 (2 overs)

Fortune Barishal won by 9 wickets
Sher-e-Bangla National Cricket Stadium, Dhaka
Umpires: Mahfuzur Rahman (Ban) and Sharfuddoula (Ban)
Player of the match: Tanvir Islam (Fortune Barishal)

- Fortune Barishal won the toss and elected to field.

Match 42
1 February 2025
18:30 (N)
Scorecard

Chittagong Kings; 206/4 (20 overs)	v	Fortune Barishal; 182/7 (20 overs)
Parvez Hossain Emon 75 (41); Taijul Islam 2/46 (4 overs)		Dawid Malan 67 (34); Binura Fernando 2/18 (4 overs)

Chittagong Kings won by 24 runs
Sher-e-Bangla National Cricket Stadium, Dhaka
Umpires: Masudur Rahman (Ban) and Raveendra Wimalasiri (SL)
Player of the match: Parvez Hossain Emon (Chittagong Kings)

- Fortune Barishal won the toss and elected to field.

== Playoffs ==
=== Qualifier 1 ===
Match 44
3 February 2025
18:30 (N)
Scorecard

Chittagong Kings; 149/9 (20 overs)	v	Fortune Barishal; 150/1 (17.2 overs)
Shamim Hossain 79 (47); Mohammad Ali 5/24 (4 overs)		Towhid Hridoy 82* (56); Khaled Ahmed 1/34 (4 overs)

Fortune Barishal won by 9 wickets
Sher-e-Bangla National Cricket Stadium, Dhaka
Umpires: Morshed Ali Khan (Ban) and Asif Yaqoob (Pak)
Player of the match: Mohammad Ali (Fortune Barishal)

- Fortune Barishal won the toss and elected to field.

=== Final ===
Match 46
7 February 2025
19:00 (N)
Scorecard

Chittagong Kings; 194/3 (20 overs)	v	Fortune Barishal; 195/7 (19.3 overs)
Parvez Hossain Emon 78* (49); Mohammad Ali 1/21 (4 overs)		Tamim Iqbal 54 (29); Shoriful Islam 4/34 (4 overs)

Fortune Barishal won by 3 wickets
Sher-e-Bangla National Cricket Stadium, Dhaka
Umpires: Masudur Rahman (Ban) and Gazi Sohel (Ban)
Player of the match: Tamim Iqbal (Fortune Barishal)

- Fortune Barishal won the toss and elected to field.
- Mushfiqur Rahim (Fortune Barishal) scored his 6,000th run in T20s.
