= 2025 Rangpur Riders season =

Bangladesh Premier League team season

Rangpur Riders
2025 season
- Coach: Mickey Arthur
- Captain: Nurul Hasan Sohan
- Ground(s): Rangpur Stadium, Rangpur
- BPL League: 4th
- Most runs: Saif Hassan (306)
- Most wickets: Akif Javed (20)

The 2025 season is the 9th season so far for the Bangladesh Premier League franchise Rangpur Riders. They were one of the seven teams that participated in the 2024 Bangladesh Premier League. They won the title only a single time in 2017-18 season. This franchise is owned by Bashundhara Group.

== Season summary ==
Rangpur Riders had a dream start of the BPL 2025 as they won all of their first 8 games of the league stage and were turned into undefeatable. But then their came the biggest disaster in this team as they lost all of their last 4 league games and finished being 3rd at the points table. Their losing run was not stopping as they also lost the Eliminator badly by 9 wickets against Khulna Tigers.

== Squad ==
Name	Nationality	Batting style	Bowling style	Notes
Batters
James Vince	England	Right-handed	Right-arm medium	Overseas player
Saif Hassan	Bangladesh	Right-handed	Right arm off break	
Alex Hales	England	Right-handed		Overseas player
Tawfique Khan	Bangladesh	Right hand	Right arm Leg break	
Steven Taylor	United States	Left-handed	Right-arm off break	Overseas player
Sediqullah Atal	Afghanistan	Left-handed		Overseas player
Aneurin Donald	England	Right-handed	Right-arm off break	Overseas player
Wicket-keepers
Nurul Hasan Sohan	Bangladesh	Right-handed	–	Captain
Irfan Sukkur	Bangladesh	Left-handed	–	
All-rounders
Andre Russell	West Indies	Right-handed	Right-arm fast-medium	Overseas player
~~Sunil Narine~~	West Indies	Left-handed	Right-arm off break	Overseas player
Mahedi Hasan	Bangladesh	Right-handed	Right-arm off break	
Khushdil Shah	Pakistan	Left-handed	Slow left-arm orthodox	Overseas player
Soumya Sarkar	Bangladesh	Left-handed	Right arm fast-medium	
Tim David	Australia	Right-handed	Right-arm off break	Overseas player
Mohammad Saifuddin	Bangladesh	Left-handed	Right-arm fast-medium	
Iftikhar Ahmed	Pakistan	Right-handed	Right-arm off break	Overseas player
Azizul Hakim Tamim	Bangladesh	Left-handed	Right-arm off break	
Curtis Campher	Ireland	Right-handed	Right-arm fast-medium	Overseas player
Pace bowlers
Nahid Rana	Bangladesh	Right-handed	Right-arm fast	
Rejaur Rahman Raja	Bangladesh	Right-handed	Right-arm fast-medium	
Saurabh Netravalkar	United States	Right handed	Left-arm fast-medium	Overseas player
Akif Javed	Pakistan	Right-handed	Left-arm fast	Overseas player
Kamrul Islam Rabbi	Bangladesh	Right-handed	Right-arm fast-medium	
Spin bowlers
Rakibul Hasan	Bangladesh	Left-handed	Slow left-arm orthodox	
~~Allah Mohammad Ghazanfar~~	Afghanistan	Right handed	Right arm off-break	Overseas player

== Coaching Panel ==
Position	Name
Head coach	Mickey Arthur
Assistant coach	Mohammad Ashraful
Batting consultant	Shahriar Nafees
Mentor & spin bowling coach	Mohammad Rafique
Fielding coach	Fahim Amin

== League stage ==
=== Points Table ===
Pos	Team	Pld	W	L	NR	Pts	NRR	Qualification
1	Fortune Barishal (C)	12	9	3	0	18	1.302	Advanced to Qualifier 1
2	Chittagong Kings (R)	12	8	4	0	16	1.395	Advanced to Qualifier 1
3	Rangpur Riders (4th)	12	8	4	0	16	0.596	Advanced to Eliminator
4	Khulna Tigers (3rd)	12	6	6	0	12	0.184	Advanced to Eliminator
5	Durbar Rajshahi	12	6	6	0	12	−1.030	
6	Dhaka Capitals	12	3	9	0	6	−0.779	
7	Sylhet Strikers	12	2	10	0	4	−1.340	

Source: ESPNcricinfo & Cricbuzz
(C) Champions; (R) Runners-up

=== Win-loss table ===
Team	1	2	3	4	5	6	7	8	9	10	11	12	Q1	El	Q2	F	Pos.
Rangpur Riders	Dhaka; 40 runs	Sylhet; 34 runs	Barishal; 8 wickets	Sylhet; 8 wickets	Dhaka; 7 wickets	Barishal; 3 wickets	Khulna; 8 runs	Chittagong; 33 runs	Rajshahi; 24 runs	Rajshahi; 2 runs	Chittagong; 5 wickets	Khulna; 46 runs	—N/a	Khulna; 9 wickets	—N/a		4th

Team's results→	Won	Tied	Lost	N/R

=== Matches ===
Match 2
30 December 2024
18:30 (N)
Scorecard

Rangpur Riders; 191/6 (20 overs)	v	Dhaka Capitals; 151/9 (20 overs)
Iftikhar Ahmed 49 (38); Alauddin Babu 3/43 (4 overs)		Litton Das 31 (27); Mahedi Hasan 4/27 (4 overs)

Rangpur Riders win by 40 runs
Sher-e-Bangla National Cricket Stadium, Dhaka
Umpires: Mahfuzur Rahman (Ban) and Raveendra Wimalasiri (SL)
Player of the match: Khushdil Shah (Rangpur Riders)

- Dhaka Capitals won the toss and elected to field.

Match 4
31 December 2024
17:00 (N)
Scorecard

Rangpur Riders; 155/6 (20 overs)	v	Sylhet Strikers; 121/9 (20 overs)
Iftikhar Ahmed 47* (42); Tanzim Hasan Sakib 2/27 (4 overs)		Rony Talukdar 41 (36); Nahid Rana 4/27 (4 overs)

Rangpur Riders won by 34 runs
Sher-e-Bangla National Cricket Stadium, Dhaka
Umpires: Gazi Sohel (Ban) and Asif Yaqoob (Pak)
Player of the match: Nahid Rana (Rangpur Riders)

- Rangpur Riders won the toss and elected to field.

Match 6
2 January 2025
18:30 (N)
Scorecard

Fortune Barishal; 124 (18.2 overs)	v	Rangpur Riders; 128/2 (15 overs)
Tamim Iqbal 28 (18); Khushdil Shah 3/18 (4 overs)		Saif Hassan 62* (46); Iqbal Hossain Emon 2/41 (3 overs)

Rangpur Riders won by 8 wickets.
Sher-e-Bangla National Cricket Stadium, Dhaka
Umpires: Morshed Ali Khan (Ban) and Asif Yaqoob (Pak)
Player of the match: Saif Hassan (Rangpur Riders)

- Rangpur Riders won the toss and elected to field.

Match 9
6 January 2025
13:30
Scorecard

Sylhet Strikers; 205/4 (20 overs)	v	Rangpur Riders; 210/2 (19 overs)
Rony Talukdar 54 (32); Mohammad Saifuddin 2/31 (4 overs)		Alex Hales 113* (56); Tanzim Hasan Sakib 2/23 (4 overs)

Rangpur Riders won by 8 wickets
Sylhet International Cricket Stadium, Sylhet
Umpires: Moniruzzaman (Ban) and Asif Yaqoob (Pak)
Player of the match: Alex Hales (Rangpur Riders)

- Rangpur Riders won the toss and elected to field.

Match 11
7 January 2025
13:30
Scorecard

Dhaka Capitals; 111 (16.3 overs)	v	Rangpur Riders; 113/3 (13.2 overs)
Tanzid Hasan 20 (16); Nahid Rana 3/21 (4 overs)		Alex Hales 44 (27); Mosaddek Hossain 1/13 (1 over)

Rangpur Riders won by 7 wickets
Sylhet International Cricket Stadium, Sylhet
Umpires: Tanvir Ahmed (Ban) and Raveendra Wimalasiri (SL)
Player of the match: Nahid Rana (Rangpur Riders)

- Rangpur Riders won the toss and elected to field.

Match 13
9 January 2025
13:30
Scorecard

Fortune Barishal; 197/5 (20 overs)	v	Rangpur Riders; 202/7 (20 overs)
Kyle Mayers 61* (29); Kamrul Islam Rabbi 2/47 (3 overs)		Khushdil Shah 48 (24); Jahandad Khan 2/48 (4 overs)

Rangpur Riders won by 3 wickets
Sylhet International Cricket Stadium, Sylhet
Umpires: Ali Arman (Ban) and Asif Yaqoob (Pak)
Player of the match: Nurul Hasan Sohan (Rangpur Riders)

- Rangpur Riders won the toss and elected to field.

Match 20
13 January 2025
18:30 (N)
Scorecard

Rangpur Riders; 186/5 (20 overs)	v	Khulna Tigers; 178/9 (20 overs)
Khushdil Shah 75* (35); Abu Hider Rony 2/37 (4 overs)		Mohammad Naim 58 (41); Akif Javed 3/29 (4 overs)

Rangpur Riders won by 8 runs
Sylhet International Cricket Stadium, Sylhet
Umpires: Raveendra Wimalasiri (SL) and Masudur Rahman (Ban)
Player of the match: Akif Javed (Rangpur Riders)

- Rangpur Riders won the toss and elected to bat.

Match 24
17 January 2025
19:00 (N)
Scorecard

Rangpur Riders; 164/7 (20 overs)	v	Chittagong Kings; 131/8 (20 overs)
Khushdil Shah 59 (28); Aliss Islam 2/28 (4 overs)		Shamim Hossain 38 (31); Akif Javed 4/32 (4 overs)

Rangpur Riders won by 33 runs
Zohur Ahmed Chowdhury Stadium, Chattogram
Umpires: Masudur Rahman (Ban) and Sharfuddoula (Ban)
Player of the match: Khushdil Shah (Rangpur Riders)

- Chittagong Kings won the toss and elected to field.

Match 31
23 January 2025
13:30
Scorecard

Durbar Rajshahi; 170/9 (20 overs)	v	Rangpur Riders; 146 (19.2 overs)
Yasir Ali 60 (32); Akif Javed 3/23 (4 overs)		Saif Hassan 43 (29); Ryan Burl 4/22 (4 overs)

Durbar Rajshahi won by 24 runs
Zohur Ahmed Chowdhury Stadium, Chattogram
Umpires: Morshed Ali Khan (Ban) and Gazi Sohel (Ban)
Player of the match: Ryan Burl (Durbar Rajshahi)

- Rangpur Riders won the toss and elected to field.

Match 34
26 January 2025
18:30 (N)
Scorecard

Durbar Rajshahi; 119/9 (20 overs)	v	Rangpur Riders; 117/8 (20 overs)
Sunzamul Islam 28* (29); Khushdil Shah 3/19 (4 overs)		Mohammad Saifuddin 52* (31); Mrittunjoy Chowdhury 4/18 (4 overs)

Durbar Rajshahi won by 2 runs
Sher-e-Bangla National Cricket Stadium, Dhaka
Umpires: Muhammad Kamruzzaman (Ban) and Sharfuddoula (Ban)
Player of the match: Mrittunjoy Chowdhury (Durbar Rajshahi)

- Rangpur Riders won the toss and elected to field.
- Soumya Sarkar (Rangpur Riders) played his 100th BPL match.

Match 37
29 January 2025
13:30
Scorecard

Rangpur Riders; 143/5 (20 overs)	v	Chittagong Kings; 148/5 (17.4 overs)
Iftikhar Ahmed 65* (47); Khaled Ahmed 2/44 (4 overs)		Haider Ali 48* (18); Mohammad Saifuddin 2/25 (2 overs)

Chittagong Kings won by 5 wickets
Sher-e-Bangla National Cricket Stadium, Dhaka
Umpires: Morshed Ali Khan (Ban) and Asif Yaqoob (Ban)
Player of the match: Haider Ali (Chittagong Kings)

- Chittagong Kings won the toss and elected to field.

Match 39
30 January 2025
13:30
Scorecard

Khulna Tigers; 220/4 (20 overs)	v	Rangpur Riders; 174/9 (20 overs)
Mohammad Naim 111* (62); Akif Javed 1/31 (4 overs)		Soumya Sarkar 74 (48); Musfik Hasan 3/24 (4 overs)

Khulna Tigers won by 46 runs
Sher-e-Bangla National Cricket Stadium, Dhaka
Umpires: Tanvir Ahmed (Ban) and Raveendra Wimalasiri (SL)
Player of the match: Mohammad Naim (Khulna Tigers)

- Khulna Tigers won the toss and elected to bat.

== Playoffs ==
=== Eliminator ===
Match 43
3 February 2025
13:30
Scorecard

Rangpur Riders; 85 (16.5 overs)	v	Khulna Tigers; 89/1 (10.2 overs)
Akif Javed 32 (18); Mehidy Hasan Miraz 3/10 (4 overs)		Mohammad Naim 48* (33); Akif Javed 1/20 (3 overs)

Khulna Tigers won by 9 wickets
Sher-e-Bangla National Cricket Stadium, Dhaka
Umpires: Masudur Rahman (Ban) and Raveendra Wimalasiri (SL)
Player of the match: Nasum Ahmed (Khulna Tigers)

- Rangpur Riders won the toss and elected to bat.
