= 2025 Bangladesh Premier League =

11th edition of Bangladesh Premier League

Bangladesh Premier League 2025
- Dates: 30 December 2024 – 7 February 2025
- Administrator: Bangladesh Cricket Board
- Cricket format: Twenty20
- Tournament format(s): Double round-robin and playoffs
- Host: Bangladesh
- Champions: Fortune Barishal (2nd title)
- Runners-up: Chittagong Kings
- Participants: 7
- Matches: 46
- Player of the series: Mehidy Hasan Miraz (Khulna Tigers)
- Most runs: Mohammad Naim (511) (Khulna Tigers)
- Most wickets: Taskin Ahmed (25) (Durbar Rajshahi)
- Official website: bplt20.com.bd

The 2025 Bangladesh Premier League, also known as 2025 Dutch-Bangla Bank Bangladesh Premier League for sponsorship reasons, was the eleventh season of the Bangladesh Premier League (BPL), a top-level professional Twenty20 cricket league in Bangladesh that was organized by the Bangladesh Cricket Board (BCB). The season started on 30 December 2024, and the final was held on 7 February 2025.

In the final, Fortune Barishal defeated Chittagong Kings by three wickets to win their second title.

== Background ==
The 2025 BPL season clashed with the Big Bash League, SA20, Super Smash, and International League T20. There were uncertainties in this season after a sudden change of government in Bangladesh, since a few of the franchises might not be available in this season due to the aftermath of that incident.

In September 2024, the ownership rights of the Dhaka franchise were acquired by Shakib Khan's Remark-Herlan Group, and its name was changed to Dhaka Capitals. Similarly, Chattogram Challengers was renamed as Chittagong Kings after its ownership was re-acquired by SQ Sports after 12 years. The Rajshahi franchise was back after 4 years and named as Durbar Rajshahi, under a new ownership of Valentine Group. Comilla Victorians did not participate in this season.

The players' draft was held on 14 October 2024.

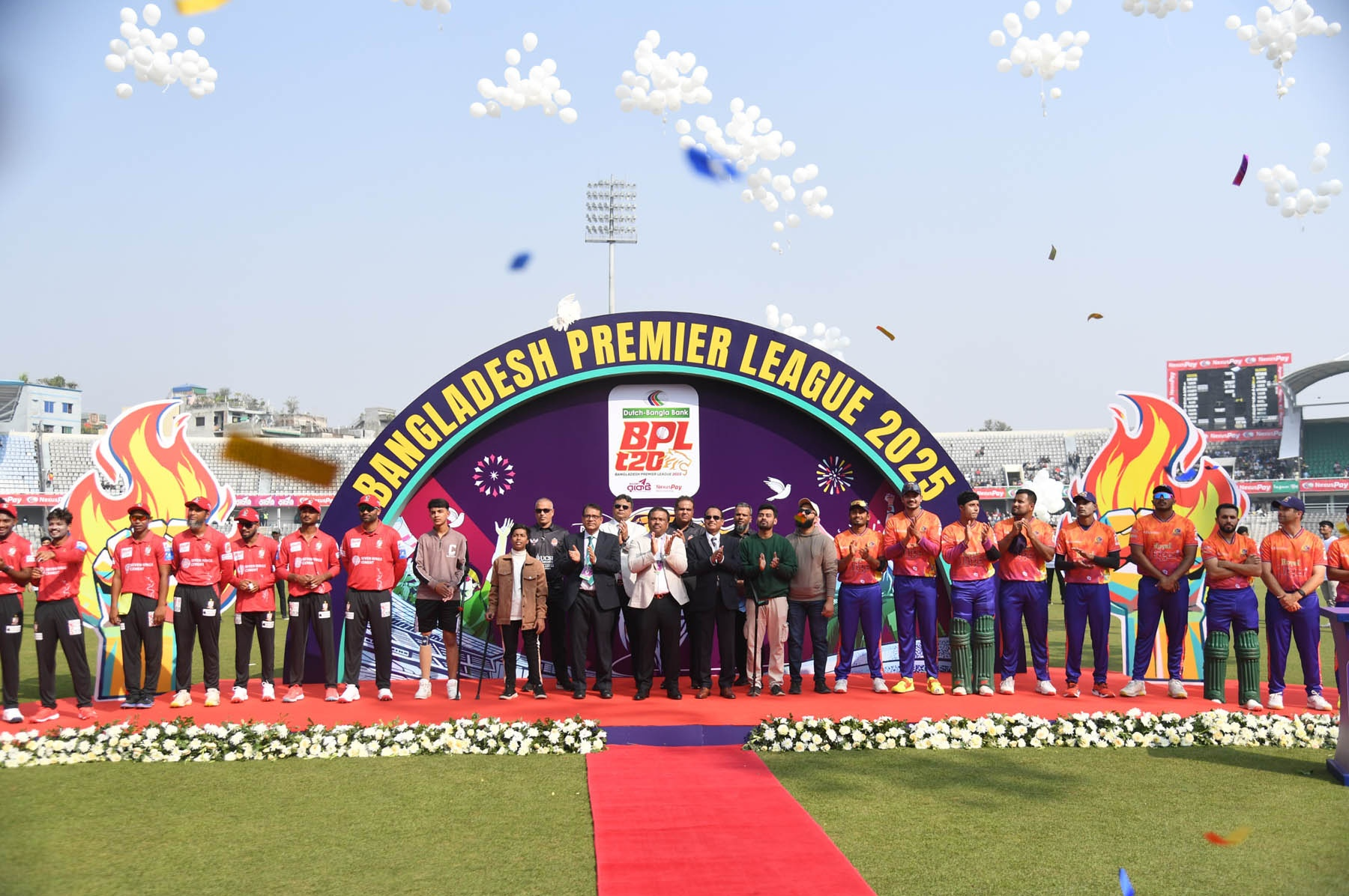
Pre-match presentation on the first day

== Marketing ==
=== Theme ===
The official theme of BPL 2025 is "Esho desh bodlai, prithibi bodlai" (lit. 'Let's change the country, change the world'). The theme mainly recognizes the July Revolution (Bangladesh), which had occurred in July–August 2024 and also manifests the changing Bangladesh.

=== Theme song ===
The theme song of BPL 2025 is "Elo BPL", composed by Bangladeshi singer Muza, featuring Raef Al Hasan Rafa & rapper Hannan Hossain Shimul. Some lyrics of the song were written by the Chief Adviser Muhammad Yunus.

=== Mascot ===
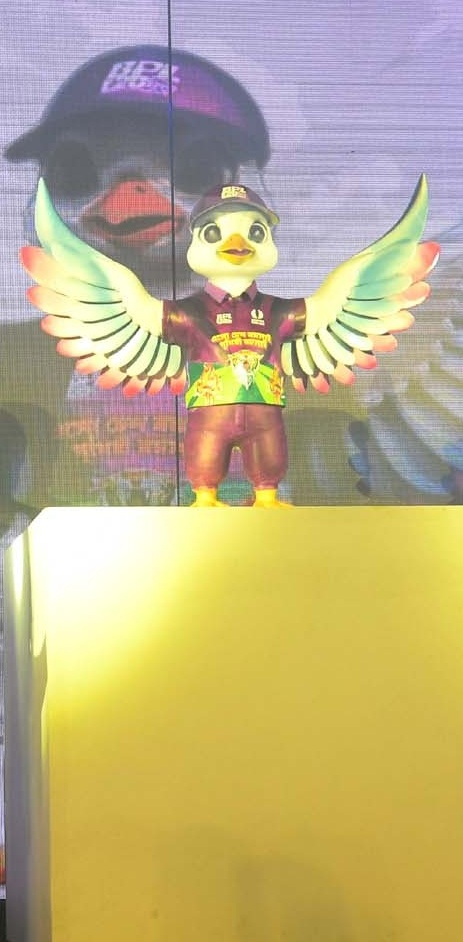
Mascot 'Dana 36'

The mascot of BPL 2025 is Dana 36, which is a peace beloved pigeon that has 36 feathers. The number 36 also refers to July 36 of Bangladesh, the popular non-existent date when authoritarian ruler Sheikh Hasina resigned & fled the country amidst the Student–People's uprising on 5 August.

=== Opening music fest ===
The opening music fest was named "Celebrating The Festival of Youth"; it occurred in Dhaka, Sylhet, and Chattogram on 23, 25, and 28 December, respectively.

In the Dhaka music fest, some famous singers such as Rahat Fateh Ali Khan (Pakistan), Raef al Hasan Rafa, Xefer Rahman, Muza, Sanjoy, and rapper Hannan Hossain Shimul sang. Also, the band Miles attended the music fest. In Sylhet music fest, some famous singers, such as James with his rock band Nagar Baul, Asif Akbar, Muza, Sanjoy, and Tosiba attended the music fest. In Chattogram music fest, some famous singers such as Habib Wahid, Fuad al Muqtadir with his band Fuad & Friends, Raef al Hasan Rafa, Muza & Sanjoy attended the music fest.

== Teams ==
Team	Coach	Captain	2024 season performance (Note: The 2024 runners-up, Comilla Victorians, did not compete during 2025.)
Chittagong Kings	Shaun Tait	Mohammad Mithun	Runner Up (Note: Chattogram was represented by Chattogram Challengers)
Dhaka Capitals	Khaled Mahmud	Thisara Perera	6th (Note: Dhaka was represented by Durdanto Dhaka in 2024.)
Durbar Rajshahi	Ijaz Ahmed	Anamul Haque / Taskin Ahmed	5th (Note: A Rajshahi franchisee was re-established ahead of the 2025 competition after the Rajshahi Royals of the 2019–20 competition, which they won.)
Fortune Barishal	Mizanur Rahman Babul	Tamim Iqbal	Champions
Khulna Tigers	Talha Jubair	Mehidy Hasan Miraz	Playoff(Qualifier 2)
Rangpur Riders	Mickey Arthur	Nurul Hasan Sohan	Playoff(Eliminator)
Sylhet Strikers	AKM Mahmud Emon	Ariful Haque	7th

== Squads ==
The players' draft was held on 14 October 2024.

Dhaka Capitals	Chittagong Kings	Durbar Rajshahi	Fortune Barishal	Rangpur Riders	Khulna Tigers	Sylhet Strikers
(Sri Lanka) Thisara Perera (c); (Bangladesh) Litton Das; (Bangladesh) Mustafizur Rahman; (Bangladesh) Tanzid Hasan; (Bangladesh) Mukidul Islam; (Bangladesh) Abu Jayed; (Bangladesh) Sabbir Rahman; (Bangladesh) Munim Shahriar; (Bangladesh) Shahadat Hossain; (Bangladesh) Asif Hasan; Rahmatullah Ali; (Bangladesh) Nazmul Islam Apu; (Bangladesh) Mehedi Hasan Rana; (Bangladesh) Habibur Rahman Sohan; (Bangladesh) Alauddin Babu; (Bangladesh) Mosaddek Hossain; (Pakistan) ~~Saim Ayub~~; (Cricket West Indies) ~~Johnson Charles~~; (Cricket West Indies) Ronsford Beaton; (England) Stephen Eskinazi; (Afghanistan) Amir Hamza; (Afghanistan) Riaz Hassan; (Afghanistan) Farmanullah; (Pakistan) Shahnawaz Dahani; (United Arab Emirates) Zahoor Khan; (Sri Lanka) Chaturanga de Silva; (United States) Shubham Ranjane; (Namibia) Jean-Pierre Kotze; (England) Jason Roy	(Bangladesh) Mohammad Mithun (c); (Bangladesh) ~~Shakib Al Hasan~~; (Bangladesh) Shoriful Islam; (Bangladesh) Shamim Hossain; (Bangladesh) Parvez Hossain Emon; (Bangladesh) Khaled Ahmed; (Bangladesh) Naeem Islam; (Bangladesh) Aliss Al Islam; (Bangladesh) Maruf Mridha; Rahatul Ferdous; (Bangladesh) Sheikh Parvez Jibon; (Bangladesh) Marshall Ayub; (Bangladesh) Nabil Samad; Ifran Hossain; (Bangladesh) Arafat Sunny; (Sri Lanka) ~~Angelo Mathews~~; (Sri Lanka) Binura Fernando; (England) Graham Clark; (Australia) Tom O'Connell; (England) ~~Moeen Ali~~; (Sri Lanka) Lahiru Milantha; (Afghanistan) Zubaid Akbari; (Pakistan) Mohammad Wasim Jr.; (Pakistan) Haider Ali; (Pakistan) Khawaja Nafay; (Pakistan) Usman Khan; (Pakistan) Hussain Talat; (Pakistan) Ali Raza	(Bangladesh) Taskin Ahmed (c); (Bangladesh) Akbar Ali; (Bangladesh) Anamul Haque; (Bangladesh) Jishan Alam; (Bangladesh) Sunzamul Islam; (Bangladesh) SM Meherob; (Bangladesh) Yasir Ali; (Bangladesh) Hasan Murad; (Bangladesh) Mohor Sheikh; (Bangladesh) Sabbir Hossain; (Bangladesh) Shafiul Islam; (Bangladesh) Mizanur Rahman; Tawaf Mashrafee Nawaz; (Bangladesh) Mrittunjoy Chowdhury; (Bangladesh) Shohag Gazi; (Bangladesh) Asaduzzaman Payel; (Bangladesh) Zahiduzzaman; (Pakistan) Mohammad Haris; (Sri Lanka) Lahiru Samarakoon; (Zimbabwe) Ryan Burl; West IndiesMiguel Cummins; West Indies Mark Deyal; (Afghanistan) Aftab Alam; (Pakistan) ~~Saad Nasim~~; (Pakistan) ~~Salman Mirza~~; (Pakistan) ~~Arafat Minhas~~; (Pakistan) ~~Bilal Khan~~; (Cricket West Indies) ~~Nathan Edward~~; (England) ~~Ravi Bopara~~; (England) ~~Samit Patel~~	(Bangladesh) Tamim Iqbal (c); (Bangladesh) Mushfiqur Rahim; (Bangladesh) Nazmul Hossain Shanto; (Bangladesh) Towhid Hridoy; (Bangladesh) Mahmudullah; (Bangladesh) Ripon Mondol; (Bangladesh) Tanvir Islam; (Bangladesh) Rishad Hossain; (Bangladesh) Taijul Islam; (Bangladesh) Ebadot Hossain; (Bangladesh) Nayeem Hasan; (Bangladesh) Shohidul Islam; (Bangladesh) Ariful Islam; (Bangladesh) Pritom Kumar; (Bangladesh) Iqbal Hossain Emon; (Pakistan) Shaheen Afridi; (Pakistan) Mohammad Ali; (Pakistan) Jahandad Khan; (Pakistan) Mohammad Imran; (South Africa) ~~Nandre Burger~~; (Pakistan) Faheem Ashraf; (Afghanistan) Mohammad Nabi; (Cricket West Indies) Kyle Mayers; (England) Dawid Malan; (New Zealand) James Fuller; (Sri Lanka) ~~Pathum Nissanka~~; (New Zealand) ~~Adam Milne~~; (Afghanistan) ~~Noor Ahmad~~; (New Zealand) James Neesham	(Bangladesh) Nurul Hasan Sohan (c); (Bangladesh) Sheikh Mahedi Hasan; (Bangladesh) Mohammad Saifuddin; (Bangladesh) Nahid Rana; (Bangladesh) Saif Hassan; (Bangladesh) Soumya Sarkar; (Bangladesh) Rakibul Hasan; (Bangladesh) Irfan Sukkur; Tawfique Khan; (Bangladesh) Kamrul Islam Rabbi; (Bangladesh) Rejaur Rahman Raja; (Bangladesh) Azizul Hakim Tamim; (Pakistan) Khushdil Shah; (Pakistan) Iftikhar Ahmed; (Pakistan) Akif Javed; (England) Alex Hales; (United States) Saurabh Netravalkar; (Ireland) Curtis Campher; (United States) Steven Taylor; (Afghanistan) ~~Allah Mohammad Ghazanfar~~; (Australia) Tim David; (England) James Vince; (Cricket West Indies) Andre Russell; (England) Aneurin Donald; (Cricket West Indies) ~~Sunil Narine~~	(Bangladesh) Mehidy Hasan Miraz (c); (Bangladesh) Nasum Ahmed; (Bangladesh) Afif Hossain; (Bangladesh) Hasan Mahmud; (Bangladesh) Naim Sheikh; (Bangladesh) Imrul Kayes; (Bangladesh) Mahmudul Hasan Joy; (Bangladesh) Mahidul Islam Ankon; (Bangladesh) Abu Hider Rony; (Bangladesh) Mahfuzur Rahman Rabby; (Bangladesh) Ziaur Rahman; (Bangladesh) Musfik Hasan; (Bangladesh) Rubel Hossain; (Pakistan) Mohammad Nawaz; (Pakistan) Salman Irshad; (England) Lewis Gregory; (Pakistan) ~~Mohammad Hasnain~~; (Afghanistan) Darwish Rasooli; (Afghanistan) Ibrahim Zadran; (Australia) Will Bosisto; (Australia) Alex Ross; (Cricket West Indies) Oshane Thomas; (England) Dom Sibley; (Pakistan) Aamir Jamal; (Cricket West Indies) Jason Holder; (Cricket West Indies) Shimron Hetmyer	(Bangladesh) Ariful Haque (c); (Bangladesh) ~~Mashrafe Mortaza~~; (Bangladesh) Tanzim Hasan Sakib; (Bangladesh) Zakir Hasan; (Bangladesh) Jaker Ali; (Bangladesh) Al-Amin Hossain; (Bangladesh) Ruyel Miah; (Bangladesh) Rony Talukder; (Bangladesh) Nihaduzzaman; (Bangladesh) Nahidul Islam; (Bangladesh) Sumon Khan; (Bangladesh) Tipu Sultan; Mehedi Hasan Sohag; (Bangladesh) Zawad Abrar; (Ireland) Paul Stirling; (Scotland) George Munsey; (Afghanistan) Samiullah Shinwari; (Cricket West Indies) Rahkeem Cornwall; (Pakistan) Ahsan Hafeez; (England) Reece Topley; (United States) Aaron Jones; (Cricket West Indies) Jon-Russ Jaggesar; (Cricket West Indies) Kadeem Alleyne

== Venues ==
Chittagong	Dhaka	Sylhet
Bir Shreshtho Flight Lieutenant Matiur Rahman Cricket Stadium	Sher-e-Bangla National Cricket Stadium	Sylhet International Cricket Stadium
Capacity: 22,000	Capacity: 25,416	Capacity: 18,500
Matches:12	Matches:22	Matches:12
2025 Bangladesh Premier League is located in Bangladesh

== Standings ==
=== Points table ===
Pos	Team	Pld	W	L	Pts	NRR	Qualification
1	Fortune Barishal	12	9	3	18	1.302	Advance to Qualifier 1
2	Chittagong Kings	12	8	4	16	1.395	Advance to Qualifier 1
3	Rangpur Riders	12	8	4	16	0.596	Advance to Eliminator
4	Khulna Tigers	12	6	6	12	0.184	Advance to Eliminator
5	Durbar Rajshahi	12	6	6	12	−1.030	
6	Dhaka Capitals	12	3	9	6	−0.779	
7	Sylhet Strikers	12	2	10	4	−1.634	

Source: ESPN Cricinfo

=== Match summary ===
Team	Group matches												Playoffs		
Team	1	2	3	4	5	6	7	8	9	10	11	12	Q1/E	Q2	F
Chittagong Kings	0	2	4	6	8	8	8	10	10	12	14	16	L	W	L
Dhaka Capitals	0	0	0	0	0	0	2	2	4	6	6	6			
Durbar Rajshahi	0	2	2	2	4	4	6	6	6	8	10	12			
Fortune Barishal	2	2	4	6	6	8	10	12	14	16	18	18	W		W
Khulna Tigers	2	4	4	4	4	4	6	6	8	8	10	12	W	L	
Rangpur Riders	2	4	6	8	10	12	14	16	16	16	16	16	L		
Sylhet Strikers	0	0	0	2	4	4	4	4	4	4	4	4			

Win	Loss	No result

- Note: The total points at the end of each group match are listed.
- Note: Click on the points (group matches) or W/L (playoffs) to see the match summary.

Visitor team →	CK	DC	DR	FB	KT	RR	SS
Home team ↓	CK	DC	DR	FB	KT	RR	SS
Chittagong Kings		Dhaka; 9 wickets	Chattogram; 111 runs	Barishal; 6 wickets	Chattogram; 45 runs	Rangpur; 33 runs	Chattogram; 96 runs
Dhaka Capitals	Chattogram; 7 wickets		Rajshahi; 7 wickets	Barishal; 9 wickets	Khulna; 20 runs	Rangpur; 40 runs	Dhaka; 6 runs
Durbar Rajshahi	Chattogram; 105 runs	Dhaka; 149 runs		Barishal; 7 wickets	Rajshahi; 28 runs	Rajshahi; 2 runs	Rajshahi; 65 runs
Fortune Barishal	Chattogram; 24 runs	Barishal; 8 wickets	Barishal; 4 wickets		Barishal; 5 wickets	Rangpur; 3 wickets	Barishal; 8 wickets
Khulna Tigers	Khulna; 37 runs	Khulna; 6 wickets	Khulna; 7 runs	Barishal; 7 runs		Rangpur; 8 runs	Khulna; 6 wickets
Rangpur Riders	Chattogram; 5 wickets	Rangpur; 7 wickets	Rajshahi; 24 runs	Rangpur; 8 wickets	Khulna; 46 runs		Rangpur; 34 runs
Sylhet Strikers	Chattogram; 30 runs	Sylhet; 3 wickets	Rajshahi; 5 wickets	Barishal; 7 wickets	Sylhet; 8 runs	Rangpur; 8 wickets	

Home team won	Visitor team won

- Note: Results listed are according to the home (horizontal) and visitor (vertical) teams.
- Note: Click on a result to see a summary of the match.

== League stage ==
The tournament schedule was announced by BCB on 12 November 2024.

Phase 1 (Dhaka)

Match 1
30 December 2024
13:30
Scorecard

Durbar Rajshahi; 197/3 (20 overs)	v	Fortune Barishal; 200/6 (18.1 overs)
Yasir Ali 94* (47); Kyle Mayers 2/13 (3 overs)		Mahmudullah 56* (26); Taskin Ahmed 3/31 (4 overs)

Fortune Barishal won by 4 wickets
Sher-e-Bangla National Cricket Stadium, Dhaka
Umpires: Masudur Rahman (Ban) and Asif Yaqoob (Pak)
Player of the match: Mahmudullah (Fortune Barishal)

- Fortune Barishal won the toss and elected to field.
- Yasir Ali (Durbar Rajshahi) scored his 2,000th run in T20s.

Match 2
30 December 2024
18:30 (N)
Scorecard

Rangpur Riders; 191/6 (20 overs)	v	Dhaka Capitals; 151/9 (20 overs)
Iftikhar Ahmed 49 (38); Alauddin Babu 3/43 (4 overs)		Litton Das 31 (27); Mahedi Hasan 4/27 (4 overs)

Rangpur Riders win by 40 runs
Sher-e-Bangla National Cricket Stadium, Dhaka
Umpires: Mahfuzur Rahman (Ban) and Raveendra Wimalasiri (SL)
Player of the match: Khushdil Shah (Rangpur Riders)

- Dhaka Capitals won the toss and elected to field.

Match 3
31 December 2024
12:00
Scorecard

Khulna Tigers; 203/4 (20 overs)	v	Chittagong Kings; 166/10 (18.5 overs)
Will Bosisto 75* (50); Aliss Islam 2/17 (4 overs)		Shamim Hossain 78 (38); Abu Hider 4/44 (3.5 overs)

Khulana Tigers won by 37 runs
Sher-e-Bangla National Cricket Stadium, Dhaka
Umpires: Tanvir Ahmed (Ban) and Raveendra Wimalasiri (SL)
Player of the match: Mahidul Islam Ankon (Khulna Tigers)

- Chittagong Kings won the toss and elected to field.

Match 4
31 December 2024
17:00 (N)
Scorecard

Rangpur Riders; 155/6 (20 overs)	v	Sylhet Strikers; 121/9 (20 overs)
Iftikhar Ahmed 47* (42); Tanzim Hasan Sakib 2/27 (4 overs)		Rony Talukdar 41 (36); Nahid Rana 4/27 (4 overs)

Rangpur Riders won by 34 runs
Sher-e-Bangla National Cricket Stadium, Dhaka
Umpires: Gazi Sohel (Ban) and Asif Yaqoob (Pak)
Player of the match: Nahid Rana (Rangpur Riders)

- Rangpur Riders won the toss and elected to field.

Match 5
2 January 2025
13:30
Scorecard

Dhaka Capitals; 174/9 (20 overs)	v	Durbar Rajshahi; 179/3 (18.1 overs)
Shahadat Hossain 50 (41); Taskin Ahmed 7/19 (3 overs)		Anamul Haque 73* (46); Mustafizur Rahman 1/33 (4 overs)

Durbar Rajshahi won by 7 wickets
Sher-e-Bangla National Cricket Stadium, Dhaka
Umpires: Mahfuzur Rahman (Ban) and Raveendra Wimalasiri (SL)
Player of the match: Taskin Ahmed (Durbar Rajshahi)

- Dhaka Capitals won the toss and elected to bat.
- Taskin Ahmed (Durbar Rajshahi) took the best bowling figures in the BPL.

Match 6
2 January 2025
18:30 (N)
Scorecard

Fortune Barishal; 124 (18.2 overs)	v	Rangpur Riders; 128/2 (15 overs)
Tamim Iqbal 28 (18); Khushdil Shah 3/18 (4 overs)		Saif Hassan 62* (46); Iqbal Hossain Emon 2/41 (3 overs)

Rangpur Riders won by 8 wickets.
Sher-e-Bangla National Cricket Stadium, Dhaka
Umpires: Morshed Ali Khan (Ban) and Asif Yaqoob (Pak)
Player of the match: Saif Hassan (Rangpur Riders)

- Rangpur Riders won the toss and elected to field.

Match 7
3 January 2025
14:00
Scorecard

Chittagong Kings; 219/5 (20 overs)	v	Durbar Rajshahi; 114 (17.1 overs)
Usman Khan 123 (62); Taskin Ahmed 2/22 (4 overs)		Mohammad Haris 32 (15); Aliss Islam 3/17 (4 overs)

Chittagong Kings won by 105 runs
Sher-e-Bangla National Cricket Stadium, Dhaka
Umpires: Asif Yaqoob (Pak) and Muhammad Kamruzzaman (Ban)
Player of the match: Usman Khan (Chittagong Kings)

- Durbar Rajshahi won the toss and elected to field.

Match 8
3 January 2025
19:00 (N)
Scorecard

Khulna Tigers; 173/8 (20 overs)	v	Dhaka Capitals; 153/6 (20 overs)
Mahidul Islam Ankon 32 (22); Chaturanga de Silva 2/22 (2 overs)		Thisara Perera 103* (60); Mehidy Hasan Miraz 3/6 (4 overs)

Khulna Tigers won by 20 runs
Sher-e-Bangla National Cricket Stadium, Dhaka
Umpires: Gazi Sohel (Ban) and Raveendra Wimalasiri (SL)
Player of the match: Mehidy Hasan Miraz (Khulna Tigers)

- Dhaka Capitals won the toss and elected to field.

Phase 2 (Sylhet)

Match 9
6 January 2025
13:30
Scorecard

Sylhet Strikers; 205/4 (20 overs)	v	Rangpur Riders; 210/2 (19 overs)
Rony Talukdar 54 (32); Mohammad Saifuddin 2/31 (4 overs)		Alex Hales 113* (56); Tanzim Hasan Sakib 2/23 (4 overs)

Rangpur Riders won by 8 wickets
Sylhet International Cricket Stadium, Sylhet
Umpires: Moniruzzaman (Ban) and Asif Yaqoob (Pak)
Player of the match: Alex Hales (Rangpur Riders)

- Rangpur Riders won the toss and elected to field.

Match 10
6 January 2025
18:30 (N)
Scorecard

Durbar Rajshahi; 168/4 (20 overs)	v	Fortune Barishal; 169/3 (17.3 overs)
Anamul Haque 39 (35); Shaheen Afridi 2/20 (4 overs)		Tamim Iqbal 86* (48); Mohor Sheikh 2/32 (2 overs)

Fortune Barishal won by 7 wickets.
Sylhet International Cricket Stadium, Sylhet
Umpires: Mahfuzur Rahman (Ban) and Raveendra Wimalasiri (SL)
Player of the match: Tamim Iqbal (Fortune Barishal)

- Fortune Barishal won the toss and elected to field.

Match 11
7 January 2025
13:30
Scorecard

Dhaka Capitals; 111 (16.3 overs)	v	Rangpur Riders; 113/3 (13.2 overs)
Tanzid Hasan 20 (16); Nahid Rana 3/21 (4 overs)		Alex Hales 44 (27); Mosaddek Hossain 1/13 (1 over)

Rangpur Riders won by 7 wickets
Sylhet International Cricket Stadium, Sylhet
Umpires: Tanvir Ahmed (Ban) and Raveendra Wimalasiri (SL)
Player of the match: Nahid Rana (Rangpur Riders)

- Rangpur Riders won the toss and elected to field.

Match 12
7 January 2025
18:30 (N)
Scorecard

Sylhet Strikers; 125 (18.2 overs)	v	Fortune Barishal; 126/3 (10.3 overs)
Ariful Haque 36 (29); Rishad Hossain 3/15 (4 overs)		Kyle Mayers 59* (31); Tanzim Hasan Sakib 2/37 (3.3 overs)

Fortune Barishal won by 7 wickets
Sylhet International Cricket Stadium, Sylhet
Umpires: Morshed Ali Khan (Ban) and Asif Yaqoob (Pak)
Player of the match: Jahandad Khan (Fortune Barishal)

- Fortune Barishal won the toss and elected to field.

Match 13
9 January 2025
13:30
Scorecard

Fortune Barishal; 197/5 (20 overs)	v	Rangpur Riders; 202/7 (20 overs)
Kyle Mayers 61* (29); Kamrul Islam Rabbi 2/47 (3 overs)		Khushdil Shah 48 (24); Jahandad Khan 2/48 (4 overs)

Rangpur Riders won by 3 wickets
Sylhet International Cricket Stadium, Sylhet
Umpires: Ali Arman (Ban) and Asif Yaqoob (Pak)
Player of the match: Nurul Hasan Sohan (Rangpur Riders)

- Rangpur Riders won the toss and elected to field.

Match 14
9 January 2025
18:30 (N)
Scorecard

Dhaka Capitals; 177/5 (20 overs)	v	Chittagong Kings; 180/3 (19.3 overs)
Sabbir Rahman 82* (33); Khaled Ahmed 3/21 (4 overs)		Usman Khan 55 (33); Mustafizur Rahman 1/23 (4 overs)

Chittagong Kings won by 7 wickets
Sylhet International Cricket Stadium, Sylhet
Umpires: Morshed Ali Khan (Ban) and Gazi Sohel (Ban)
Player of the match: Khaled Ahmed (Chittagong Kings)

- Chittagong Kings won the toss and elected to field.

Match 15
10 January 2025
14:00
Scorecard

Durbar Rajshahi; 178/5 (20 overs)	v	Khulna Tigers; 150 (19.3 overs)
Ryan Burl 48* (29); Nasum Ahmed 2/20 (3 overs)		Afif Hossain 33 (30); Ryan Burl 2/13 (2 overs)

Durbar Rajshahi won by 28 runs
Sylhet International Cricket Stadium, Sylhet
Umpires: Raveendra Wimalasiri (SL) and Tanvir Ahmed (Ban)
Player of the match: Ryan Burl (Durbar Rajshahi)

- Khulna Tigers won the toss and elected to field.

Match 16
10 January 2025
19:00 (N)
Scorecard

Dhaka Capitals; 193/6 (20 overs)	v	Sylhet Strikers; 195/7 (18.4 overs)
Litton Das 73 (43); Rahkeem Cornwall 3/27 (4 overs)		Zakir Hasan 58 (27); Farmanullah 2/37 (4 overs)

Sylhet Strikers won by 3 wickets
Sylhet International Cricket Stadium, Sylhet
Umpires: Asif Yaqoob (Pak) and Masudur Rahman (Ban)
Player of the match: Zakir Hasan (Sylhet Strikers)

- Dhaka Capitals won the toss and elected to bat.

Match 17
12 January 2025
13:30
Scorecard

Sylhet Strikers; 182/5 (20 overs)	v	Khulna Tigers; 174/9 (20 overs)
Zakir Hasan 75* (46); Abu Hider Rony 2/25 (4 overs)		Will Bosisto 43 (40); Ruyel Miah 2/28 (4 overs)

Sylhet Strikers won by 8 runs
Sylhet International Cricket Stadium, Sylhet
Umpires: Raveendra Wimalasiri (SL) and Gazi Sohel (Ban)
Player of the match: Zakir Hasan (Sylhet Strikers)

- Khulna Tigers won the toss and elected to field.

Match 18
12 January 2025
18:30 (N)
Scorecard

Dhaka Capitals; 254/1 (20 overs)	v	Durbar Rajshahi; 105 (15.2 overs)
Litton Das 125* (55); Shafiul Islam 1/62 (4 overs)		Ryan Burl 47* (32); Abu Jayed 2/15 (3 overs)

Dhaka Capitals won by 149 runs
Sylhet International Cricket Stadium, Sylhet
Umpires: Asif Yaqoob (Pak) and Morshed Ali Khan (Ban)
Player of the match: Litton Das (Dhaka Capitals)

- Durbar Rajshahi won the toss and elected to field.

Match 19
13 January 2025
13:30
Scorecard

Chittagong Kings; 203/6 (20 overs)	v	Sylhet Strikers; 173/8 (20 overs)
Graham Clark 60 (33); Tanzim Hasan Sakib 2/38 (4 overs)		George Munsey 52 (37); Mohammad Wasim 3/25 (4 overs)

Chittagong Kings won by 30 runs
Sylhet International Cricket Stadium, Sylhet
Umpires: Asif Yaqoob (Pak) and Ali Arman (Ban)
Player of the match: Graham Clark (Chittagong Kings)

- Sylhet Strikers won the toss and elected to field.

Match 20
13 January 2025
18:30 (N)
Scorecard

Rangpur Riders; 186/5 (20 overs)	v	Khulna Tigers; 178/9 (20 overs)
Khushdil Shah 75* (35); Abu Hider Rony 2/37 (4 overs)		Mohammad Naim 58 (41); Akif Javed 3/29 (4 overs)

Rangpur Riders won by 8 runs
Sylhet International Cricket Stadium, Sylhet
Umpires: Raveendra Wimalasiri (SL) and Masudur Rahman (Ban)
Player of the match: Akif Javed (Rangpur Riders)

- Rangpur Riders won the toss and elected to bat.

Phase 3 (Chattogram)

Match 21
16 January 2025
13:30
Scorecard

Dhaka Capitals; 139 (19.3 overs)	v	Fortune Barishal; 145/2 (16 overs)
Tanzid Hasan 62 (44); Tanvir Islam 3/39 (3 overs)		Tamim Iqbal 61 (48); Thisara Perera 1/25 (3 overs)

Fortune Barishal won by 8 wickets
Zohur Ahmed Chowdhury Stadium, Chattogram
Umpires: Asif Yaqoob (Pak) and Moniruzzaman (Ban)
Player of the match: Tamim Iqbal (Fortune Barishal)

- Dhaka Capitals won the toss and elected to bat.

Match 22
16 January 2025
18:30 (N)
Scorecard

Chittagong Kings; 200/7 (20 overs)	v	Khulna Tigers; 155/9 (20 overs)
Graham Clark 101 (50); Mohammad Nawaz 3/29 (4 overs)		Darwish Rasooli 37 (31); Arafat Sunny 3/25 (4 overs)

Chittagong Kings won by 45 runs
Zohur Ahmed Chowdhury Stadium, Chattogram
Umpires: Mahfuzur Rahman and Sharfuddoula
Player of the match: Graham Clark (Chittagong Kings)

- Khulna Tigers won the toss and elected to field.

Match 23
17 January 2025
14:00
Scorecard

Durbar Rajshahi; 184/7 (20 overs)	v	Sylhet Strikers; 119 (17.3 overs)
Ryan Burl 41 (27); Ruyel Miah 3/32 (4 overs)		Zakir Hasan 39 (28); Sunzamul Islam 3/25 (4 overs)

Durbar Rajshahi won by 65 runs
Zohur Ahmed Chowdhury Stadium, Chattogram
Umpires: Raveendra Wimalasiri (SL) and Ali Arman (Ban)
Player of the match: Sunzamul Islam (Durbar Rajshahi)

- Durbar Rajshahi won the toss and elected to bat.

Match 24
17 January 2025
19:00 (N)
Scorecard

Rangpur Riders; 164/7 (20 overs)	v	Chittagong Kings; 131/8 (20 overs)
Khushdil Shah 59 (28); Aliss Islam 2/28 (4 overs)		Shamim Hossain 38 (31); Akif Javed 4/32 (4 overs)

Rangpur Riders won by 33 runs
Zohur Ahmed Chowdhury Stadium, Chattogram
Umpires: Masudur Rahman (Ban) and Sharfuddoula (Ban)
Player of the match: Khushdil Shah (Rangpur Riders)

- Chittagong Kings won the toss and elected to field.

Match 25
19 January 2025
13:30
Scorecard

Chittagong Kings; 121/8 (20 overs)	v	Fortune Barishal; 122/4 (16.5 overs)
Mohammad Mithun 35 (34); Faheem Ashraf 3/12 (4 overs)		Dawid Malan 56* (41); Khaled Ahmed 2/27 (3.5 overs)

Fortune Barishal won by 6 wickets
Zohur Ahmed Chowdhury Stadium, Chattogram
Umpires: Tanvir Ahmed (Ban) and Sharfuddoula (Ban)
Player of the match: Dawid Malan (Fortune Barishal)

- Fortune Barishal won the toss and elected to field.

Match 26
19 January 2025
18:30 (N)
Scorecard

Khulna Tigers; 209/4 (20 overs)	v	Durbar Rajshahi; 202/4 (20 overs)
Afif Hossain 56 (42); Taskin Ahmed 2/36 (4 overs)		Anamul Haque 100* (57); Hasan Mahmud 2/25 (4 overs)

Khulna Tigers won by 7 runs
Zohur Ahmed Chowdhury Stadium, Chattogram
Umpires: Asif Yaqoob (Pak) and Gazi Sohel (Ban)
Player of the match: Hasan Mahmud (Khulna Tigers)

- Khulna Tigers won the toss and elected to bat.

Match 27
20 January 2025
13:30
Scorecard

Dhaka Capitals; 196/6 (20 overs)	v	Sylhet Strikers; 190/7 (20 overs)
Litton Das 70 (48); Tipu Sultan 2/26 (4 overs)		Rony Talukdar 68 (44); Thisara Perera 2/31 (4 overs)

Dhaka Capitals win by 6 runs
Zohur Ahmed Chowdhury Stadium, Chattogram
Umpires: Morshed Ali Khan (Ban) and Muhammad Kamruzzaman (Ban)
Player of the match: Thisara Perera (Dhaka Capitals)

- Dhaka Capitals won the toss and elected to bat.

Match 28
20 January 2025
18:30 (N)
Scorecard

Chittagong Kings; 191/8 (20 overs)	v	Durbar Rajshahi; 80 (14.2 overs)
Naeem Islam 56 (41); Taskin Ahmed 2/23 (4 overs)		Anamul Haque 21 (21); Naeem Islam 2/6 (3 overs)

Chittagong Kings won by 111 runs
Zohur Ahmed Chowdhury Stadium, Chattogram
Umpires: Masudur Rahman (Ban) and Gazi Sohel (Ban)
Player of the match: Naeem Islam (Chittagong Kings)

- Durbar Rajshahi won the toss and elected to field.

Match 29
22 January 2025
13:30
Scorecard

Chittagong Kings; 148/6 (20 overs)	v	Dhaka Capitals; 149/2 (18.1 overs)
Naeem Islam 44 (40); Mosaddek Hossain 2/13 (3 overs)		Tanzid Hasan 90* 54; Aliss Al Islam 1/18 (4 overs)

Dhaka Capitals won by 8 wickets
Zohur Ahmed Chowdhury Stadium, Chattogram
Umpires: Gazi Sohel and Muhammad Kamruzzaman
Player of the match: Tanzid Hasan (Dhaka Capitals)

- Chittagong Kings won the toss and elected to bat.

Match 30
22 January 2025
18:30 (N)
Scorecard

Fortune Barishal; 167/9 (20 overs)	v	Khulna Tigers; 160/6 (20 overs)
Mahmudullah 50 (45); Mehidy Hasan Miraz 3/35 (4 overs)		Mohammad Naim 77 (59); Jahandad Khan 2/20 (4 overs)

Fortune Barishal won by 7 runs
Zohur Ahmed Chowdhury Stadium, Chattogram
Umpires: Sharfuddoula (Ban) and Morshed Ali Khan (Ban)
Player of the match: Rishad Hossain (Fortune Barishal)

- Khulna Tigers won the toss and elected to field.

Match 31
23 January 2025
13:30
Scorecard

Durbar Rajshahi; 170/9 (20 overs)	v	Rangpur Riders; 146 (19.2 overs)
Yasir Ali 60 (32); Akif Javed 3/23 (4 overs)		Saif Hassan 43 (29); Ryan Burl 4/22 (4 overs)

Durbar Rajshahi won by 24 runs
Zohur Ahmed Chowdhury Stadium, Chattogram
Umpires: Morshed Ali Khan (Ban) and Gazi Sohel (Ban)
Player of the match: Ryan Burl (Durbar Rajshahi)

- Rangpur Riders won the toss and elected to field.

Match 32
23 January 2025
18:30 (N)
Scorecard

Sylhet Strikers; 152/9 (20 overs)	v	Khulna Tigers; 156/4 (19.5 overs)
George Munsey 58 (32); Salman Irshad 2/24 (4 overs)		Mehidy Hasan Miraz 70 (50); Nihaduzzaman 2/25 (4 overs)

Khulna Tigers won by 6 wickets
Zohur Ahmed Chowdhury Stadium, Chattogram
Umpires: Masudur Rahman (Ban) and Tanvir Ahmed (Ban)
Player of the match: Mehidy Hasan Miraz (Khulna Tigers)

- Sylhet Strikers won the toss and elected to bat.

Phase 4 (Dhaka)

Match 33
26 January 2025
13:30
Scorecard

Sylhet Strikers; 116 (18.1 overs)	v	Fortune Barishal; 120/2 (16 overs)
Ahsan Hafeez 28 (29); Faheem Ashraf 5/7 (3.1 overs)		Tamim Iqbal 52* (51); Sumon Khan 1/17 (3 overs)

Fortune Barishal won by 8 wickets
Sher-e-Bangla National Cricket Stadium, Dhaka
Umpires: Tanvir Ahmed (Ban) and Raveendra Wimalasiri (SL)
Player of the match: Faheem Ashraf (Fortune Barishal)

- Sylhet Strikers won the toss and elected to bat.

Match 34
26 January 2025
18:30 (N)
Scorecard

Durbar Rajshahi; 119/9 (20 overs)	v	Rangpur Riders; 117/8 (20 overs)
Sunzamul Islam 28* (29); Khushdil Shah 3/19 (4 overs)		Mohammad Saifuddin 52* (31); Mrittunjoy Chowdhury 4/18 (4 overs)

Durbar Rajshahi won by 2 runs
Sher-e-Bangla National Cricket Stadium, Dhaka
Umpires: Muhammad Kamruzzaman (Ban) and Sharfuddoula (Ban)
Player of the match: Mrittunjoy Chowdhury (Durbar Rajshahi)

- Rangpur Riders won the toss and elected to field.
- Soumya Sarkar (Rangpur Riders) played his 100th BPL match.

Match 35
27 January 2025
13:30
Scorecard

Khulna Tigers; 187/5 (20 overs)	v	Fortune Barishal; 188/5 (19.1 overs)
Mohammad Naim 51 (27); Faheem Ashraf 2/49 (4 overs)		Dawid Malan 63 (37); Abu Hider Rony 2/35 (2.4 overs)

Fortune Barishal won by 5 wickets
Sher-e-Bangla National Cricket Stadium, Dhaka
Umpires: Mahfuzur Rahman (Ban) and Sharfuddoula (Ban)
Player of the match: Dawid Malan (Fortune Barishal)

- Fortune Barishal won the toss and elected to field.

Match 36
27 January 2025
18:30 (N)
Scorecard

Sylhet Strikers; 117/9 (20 overs)	v	Durbar Rajshahi; 121/5 (16.5 overs)
Ahsan Hafeez 25 (21); SM Meherob 4/15 (4 overs)		Ryan Burl 48 (34); Tanzim Hasan Sakib 2/17 (4 overs)

Durbar Rajshahi won by 5 wickets
Sher-e-Bangla National Cricket Stadium, Dhaka
Umpires: Sajidul Islam (Ban) and Asif Yaqoob (Pak)
Player of the match: SM Meherob (Durbar Rajshahi)

- Durbar Rajshahi won the toss and elected to field.

Match 37
29 January 2025
13:30
Scorecard

Rangpur Riders; 143/5 (20 overs)	v	Chittagong Kings; 148/5 (17.4 overs)
Iftikhar Ahmed 65* (47); Khaled Ahmed 2/44 (4 overs)		Haider Ali 48* (18); Mohammad Saifuddin 2/25 (2 overs)

Chittagong Kings won by 5 wickets
Sher-e-Bangla National Cricket Stadium, Dhaka
Umpires: Morshed Ali Khan (Ban) and Asif Yaqoob (Ban)
Player of the match: Haider Ali (Chittagong Kings)

- Chittagong Kings won the toss and elected to field.

Match 38
29 January 2025
18:30 (N)
Scorecard

Dhaka Capitals; 73 (15.3 overs)	v	Fortune Barishal; 77/1 (6.3 overs)
Thisara Perera 15 (11); Tanvir Islam 3/2 (2 overs)		Dawid Malan 37* (16); Mustafizur Rahman 1/16 (2 overs)

Fortune Barishal won by 9 wickets
Sher-e-Bangla National Cricket Stadium, Dhaka
Umpires: Mahfuzur Rahman (Ban) and Sharfuddoula (Ban)
Player of the match: Tanvir Islam (Fortune Barishal)

- Fortune Barishal won the toss and elected to field.

Match 39
30 January 2025
13:30
Scorecard

Khulna Tigers; 220/4 (20 overs)	v	Rangpur Riders; 174/9 (20 overs)
Mohammad Naim 111* (62); Akif Javed 1/31 (4 overs)		Soumya Sarkar 74 (48); Musfik Hasan 3/24 (4 overs)

Khulna Tigers won by 46 runs
Sher-e-Bangla National Cricket Stadium, Dhaka
Umpires: Tanvir Ahmed (Ban) and Raveendra Wimalasiri (SL)
Player of the match: Mohammad Naim (Khulna Tigers)

- Khulna Tigers won the toss and elected to bat.

Match 40
30 January 2025
18:30 (N)
Scorecard

Chittagong Kings; 196/8 (20 overs)	v	Sylhet Strikers; 100 (15.2 overs)
Khawaja Nafay 52 (30); Tanzim Hasan Sakib 3/37 (4 overs)		Zakir Hasan 19 (12); Shoriful Islam 4/5 (3.2 overs)

Chittagong Kings won by 96 runs
Sher-e-Bangla National Cricket Stadium, Dhaka
Umpires: Morshed Ali Khan (Ban) and Gazi Sohel (Ban)
Player of the match: Shoriful Islam (Chittagong Kings)

- Sylhet Strikers won the toss and elected to field.

Match 41
1 February 2025
13:30
Scorecard

Dhaka Capitals; 123/9 (20 overs)	v	Khulna Tigers; 128/4 (16.5 overs)
Tanzid Hasan 58 (37); Hasan Mahmud 2/5 (4 overs)		Mehidy Hasan Miraz 74* (55); Mustafizur Rahman 3/16 (4 overs)

Khulna Tigers won by 6 wickets
Sher-e-Bangla National Cricket Stadium, Dhaka
Umpires: Morshed Ali Khan (Ban) and Mahfuzur Rahman (Ban)
Player of the match: Mehidy Hasan Miraz (Khulna Tigers)

- Dhaka Capitals won the toss and elected to bat.

Match 42
1 February 2025
18:30 (N)
Scorecard

Chittagong Kings; 206/4 (20 overs)	v	Fortune Barishal; 182/7 (20 overs)
Parvez Hossain Emon 75 (41); Taijul Islam 2/46 (4 overs)		Dawid Malan 67 (34); Binura Fernando 2/18 (4 overs)

Chittagong Kings won by 24 runs
Sher-e-Bangla National Cricket Stadium, Dhaka
Umpires: Masudur Rahman (Ban) and Raveendra Wimalasiri (SL)
Player of the match: Parvez Hossain Emon (Chittagong Kings)

- Fortune Barishal won the toss and elected to field.

== Play-offs ==
Qualifier 1
3 February 2025 — Dhaka
1	Fortune Barishal	150/1 (17.2 overs)
2	Chittagong Kings	149/9 (20 overs)
Eliminator
3 February 2025 — Dhaka
3	Rangpur Riders	85 (16.5 overs)
4	Khulna Tigers	89/1 (10.2 overs)

Qualifier 2
5 February 2024 — Dhaka
Q1L	Chittagong Kings	164/8 (20 overs)
EW	Khulna Tigers	163/6 (20 overs)

Final
7 February 2024 — Dhaka
Q1W	Fortune Barishal	195/7 (19.3 overs)
Q2W	Chittagong Kings	194/3 (20 overs)

=== Eliminator ===
Match 43
3 February 2025
13:30
Scorecard

Rangpur Riders; 85 (16.5 overs)	v	Khulna Tigers; 89/1 (10.2 overs)
Akif Javed 32 (18); Mehidy Hasan Miraz 3/10 (4 overs)		Mohammad Naim 48* (33); Akif Javed 1/20 (3 overs)

Khulna Tigers won by 9 wickets
Sher-e-Bangla National Cricket Stadium, Dhaka
Umpires: Masudur Rahman (Ban) and Raveendra Wimalasiri (SL)
Player of the match: Nasum Ahmed (Khulna Tigers)

- Rangpur Riders won the toss and elected to bat.

=== Qualifier 1 ===
Match 44
3 February 2025
18:30 (N)
Scorecard

Chittagong Kings; 149/9 (20 overs)	v	Fortune Barishal; 150/1 (17.2 overs)
Shamim Hossain 79 (47); Mohammad Ali 5/24 (4 overs)		Towhid Hridoy 82* (56); Khaled Ahmed 1/34 (4 overs)

Fortune Barishal won by 9 wickets
Sher-e-Bangla National Cricket Stadium, Dhaka
Umpires: Morshed Ali Khan (Ban) and Asif Yaqoob (Pak)
Player of the match: Mohammad Ali (Fortune Barishal)

- Fortune Barishal won the toss and elected to field.

=== Qualifier 2 ===
Match 45
5 February 2025
18:30 (N)
Scorecard

Khulna Tigers; 163/6 (20 overs)	v	Chittagong Kings; 164/8 (20 overs)
Shimron Hetmyer 63 (33); Binura Fernando 2/27 (4 overs)		Khawaja Nafay 57 (46); Musfik Hasan 3/32 (3 overs)

Chittagong Kings won by 2 wickets
Sher-e-Bangla National Cricket Stadium, Dhaka
Umpires: Gazi Sohel (Ban) and Raveendra Wimalasiri (Ban)
Player of the match: Aliss Islam (Chittagong Kings)

- Chittagong Kings won the toss and elected to field.

=== Final ===
Match 46
7 February 2025
19:00 (N)
Scorecard

Chittagong Kings; 194/3 (20 overs)	v	Fortune Barishal; 195/7 (19.3 overs)
Parvez Hossain Emon 78* (49); Mohammad Ali 1/21 (4 overs)		Tamim Iqbal 54 (29); Shoriful Islam 4/34 (4 overs)

Fortune Barishal won by 3 wickets
Sher-e-Bangla National Cricket Stadium, Dhaka
Umpires: Masudur Rahman (Ban) and Gazi Sohel (Ban)
Player of the match: Tamim Iqbal (Fortune Barishal)

- Fortune Barishal won the toss and elected to field.
- Mushfiqur Rahim (Fortune Barishal) scored his 6,000th run in T20s.

== Statistics ==
Most runs
Runs	Player	Team
511	Mohammad Naim	Khulna Tigers
485	Tanzid Hasan	Dhaka Capitals
431	Graham Clark	Chittagong Kings
413	Tamim Iqbal	Fortune Barishal
392	Anamul Haque	Durbar Rajshahi

- Source: ESPNCricinfo

Highest individual score
Runs	Player	Team	Against	Date	Venue
125*	Litton Das	Dhaka Capitals	Durbar Rajshahi	12 January 2025	Sylhet
123	Usman Khan	Chittagong Kings	Durbar Rajshahi	3 January 2025	Dhaka
113*	Alex Hales	Rangpur Riders	Sylhet Strikers	6 January 2025	Sylhet
111*	Mohammad Naim	Khulna Tigers	Rangpur Riders	30 January 2025	Dhaka
108	Tanzid Hasan	Dhaka Capitals	Durbar Rajshahi	12 January 2025	Sylhet

- Source: ESPNCricinfo

Most wickets
Wickets	Player	Team
25	Taskin Ahmed	Durbar Rajshahi
20	Faheem Ashraf	Fortune Barishal
20	Akif Javed	Rangpur Riders
20	Khaled Ahmed	Chittagong Kings
17	Khushdil Shah	Rangpur Riders
17	Abu Hider Rony	Khulna Tigers

- Source: ESPNCricinfo

Highest team totals
Score	Team	Against	Result	Date	Venue
254/1 (20 overs)	Dhaka Capitals	Durbar Rajshahi	Won by 149 runs	12 January 2025	Sylhet
220/4 (20 overs)	Khulna Tigers	Rangpur Riders	Won by 46 runs	30 January 2025	Dhaka
219/5 (20 overs)	Chittagong Kings	Durbar Rajshahi	Won by 105 runs	3 January 2025	Dhaka
210/4 (19 overs)	Rangpur Riders	Sylhet Strikers	Won by 8 wickets	6 January 2025	Sylhet
209/4 (20 overs)	Khulna Tigers	Durbar Rajshahi	Won by 7 runs	19 January 2025	Chattogram

- Source: ESPNCricinfo

== Awards ==
Awards	Awardee (Team)	Performance	Prize	Ref
Player of the match in the Final	Tamim Iqbal (Fortune Barishal)	54 (29)	৳5 lakh (US$4,100)	
Best Fielder of the tournament	Mushfiqur Rahim (Fortune Barishal)	12 catches & 2 stumpings	৳3 lakh (US$2,400)	
Highest Wicket-taker of the tournament	Taskin Ahmed (Durbar Rajshahi)	25 wickets (12 innings)	৳5 lakh (US$4,100)	
Highest run-getter of the tournament	Mohammad Naim (Khulna Tigers)	511 runs (14 innings)	৳5 lakh (US$4,100)	
Young player of the tournament	Tanzid Hasan (Dhaka Capitals)	485 runs (12 innings)	৳3 lakh (US$2,400)	
Player of the tournament	Mehidy Hasan Miraz (Khulna Tigers)	355 runs; 13 wickets (14 innings)	৳10 lakh (US$8,100)	
3rd place	Khulna Tigers	—N/a	৳60 lakh (US$49,000)	
Runners-up	Chittagong Kings	—N/a	৳1.5 crore (US$120,000)	
Champion	Fortune Barishal	—N/a	৳2.5 crore (US$200,000)	

== Controversies ==
The overseas players of Durbar Rajshahi did not take the field against Rangpur Riders on 26 January 2025 due to non-payment of dues. Judging the condition, BCB overturned the rule requiring a minimum of two foreign players in the playing XI and granted permission to Durbar Rajshahi to field a team comprising 11 local players for one match. However, they won the match without any overseas players.

There was also a payment-related issue with Chittagong Kings, as some player's cheques were bounced back several times. However, their owner acknowledged the issue, stating that he was withholding payment due to lack of self-satisfaction.

== See also ==
- Chittagong Kings in 2025 BPL
- Dhaka Capitals in 2025 BPL
- Durbar Rajshahi in 2025 BPL
- Fortune Barishal in 2025 BPL
- Khulna Tigers in 2025 BPL
- Rangpur Riders in 2025 BPL
- Sylhet Strikers in 2025 BPL
- 2025 Bangladesh Premier League final
