= 2025 Dhaka Capitals season =

Bangladesh Premier League team season

Dhaka Capitals
2025 season
- Coach: Khaled Mahmud
- Captain: Thisara Perera
- Ground(s): Sher-e-Bangla National Cricket Stadium, Dhaka
- BPL League: 6th
- Most runs: Tanzid Hasan (485)
- Most wickets: Mustafizur Rahman (13)

The 2025 season was the 11th season for the Bangladesh Premier League franchise Dhaka Capitals. They were one of the seven teams that participated in the tournament, having changed their name from Durdanto Dhaka. The team is owned by the Champions Sports Ltd, partnered with Shakib Khan & Remark HB Limited. They have won the title 3 times in 2012, 2013 & 2016.

== Squad ==
| Name | Nationality | Batting style | Bowling style | Notes |
Batters
| Tanzid Hasan | Bangladesh | Left-handed | – | |
| Habibur Rahman Sohan | Bangladesh | Right-handed | – | |
| Riaz Hassan | Afghanistan | Right-handed | | Overseas player |
| Munim Shahriar | Bangladesh | Right-handed | – | |
| Shahadat Hossain | Bangladesh | Right-handed | Right-arm off-break | |
| ~~Saim Ayub~~ | Pakistan | Left-handed | Right-arm off-break | Overseas player |
| Jason Roy | England | Right-handed | Right-Arm Medium | Overseas player |
Wicket-keepers
| Stephen Eskinazi | England | Right-handed | | Overseas player |
| JP Kotze | Namibia | Left-handed | | Overseas player |
| Johnson Charles | West Indies | Right-handed | Right-Arm Medium | Overseas player |
| Litton Das | Bangladesh | Right handed | | Vice-captain |
All-rounders
| Thisara Perera | Sri Lanka | Left-handed | Right-Arm Medium-fast | Overseas player |
| Rahmatullah Ali | Bangladesh | Right-handed | Right-arm off-break | |
| Sabbir Rahman | Bangladesh | Right-handed | Right-arm leg-break | |
| Farmanullah | Afghanistan | Right-handed | Right-Arm Medium-fast | Overseas player |
| Shubham Ranjane | United States | Right-handed | Right-Arm Medium | Overseas player |
| Chaturanga de Silva | Sri Lanka | Left-handed | Slow left-arm orthodox | Overseas player |
| Mosaddek Hossain | Bangladesh | Right-handed | Right-arm off-break | |
Spin bowlers
| Amir Hamza | Afghanistan | Right-handed | Slow left-arm orthodox | Overseas player |
| Asif Hasan | Bangladesh | Right-handed | Slow left-arm orthodox | |
| Nazmul Islam Apu | Bangladesh | Left-handed | Slow left-arm orthodox | |
Pace bowlers
| Mustafizur Rahman | Bangladesh | Left-handed | Left-arm fast-medium | |
| Mehedi Hasan Rana | Bangladesh | Left-handed | Left-arm fast | |
| Mukidul Islam | Bangladesh | Right-handed | Right-arm Fast-Medium | |
| Zahoor Khan | United Arab Emirates | Right-handed | Right-arm Fast-Medium | Overseas player |
| Abu Jayed | Bangladesh | Right-handed | Right-arm Fast-Medium | |
| Alauddin Babu | Bangladesh | Right-handed | Right-arm medium | |
| Ronsford Beaton | West Indies | Right-handed | Right-arm fast | Overseas player |
| Shahnawaz Dahani | Pakistan | Right-handed | Right-arm Fast-Medium | Overseas player |

== Coaching staff ==
| Position | Name |
|---|---|
| Head coach | Khaled Mahmud |
| Assistant coach | Foisal Hossain |
| Mentor | Saeed Ajmal |
| Strength and conditioning coach | Niaz Ul Islam |

== League stage ==
=== Points Table ===
| Pos | Team | Pld | W | L | NR | Pts | NRR | Qualification |
|---|---|---|---|---|---|---|---|---|
| 1 | Fortune Barishal (C) | 12 | 9 | 3 | 0 | 18 | 1.302 | Advanced to Qualifier 1 |
| 2 | Chittagong Kings (R) | 12 | 8 | 4 | 0 | 16 | 1.395 | Advanced to Qualifier 1 |
| 3 | Rangpur Riders (4th) | 12 | 8 | 4 | 0 | 16 | 0.596 | Advanced to Eliminator |
| 4 | Khulna Tigers (3rd) | 12 | 6 | 6 | 0 | 12 | 0.184 | Advanced to Eliminator |
| 5 | Durbar Rajshahi | 12 | 6 | 6 | 0 | 12 | −1.030 | |
| 6 | Dhaka Capitals | 12 | 3 | 9 | 0 | 6 | −0.779 | |
| 7 | Sylhet Strikers | 12 | 2 | 10 | 0 | 4 | −1.340 | |

Source: ESPNcricinfo & Cricbuzz
(C) Champions; (R) Runners-up

=== Win-loss table ===
| Team | 1 | 2 | 3 | 4 | 5 | 6 | 7 | 8 | 9 | 10 | 11 | 12 | Q1 | El | Q2 | F | Pos. |
|---|---|---|---|---|---|---|---|---|---|---|---|---|---|---|---|---|---|
| Dhaka Capitals | Rangpur; 40 runs | Rajshahi; 7 wickets | Khulna; 20 runs | Rangpur; 7 wickets | Chittagong; 7 wickets | Sylhet; 3 wickets | Rajshahi; 149 runs | Barishal; 8 wickets | Sylhet; 6 runs | Chittagong; 8 wickets | Barishal; 9 wickets | Khulna; 6 wickets | —N/a | | | | 6th |

| Team's results→ | Won | Tied | Lost | N/R |

=== Matches ===
Match 2
30 December 2024
18:30 (N)
Scorecard

| Rangpur Riders; 191/6 (20 overs) | v | Dhaka Capitals; 151/9 (20 overs) |
| Iftikhar Ahmed 49 (38); Alauddin Babu 3/43 (4 overs) | | Litton Das 31 (27); Mahedi Hasan 4/27 (4 overs) |

Rangpur Riders win by 40 runs
Sher-e-Bangla National Cricket Stadium, Dhaka
Umpires: Mahfuzur Rahman (Ban) and Raveendra Wimalasiri (SL)
Player of the match: Khushdil Shah (Rangpur Riders)

- Dhaka Capitals won the toss and elected to field.

Match 5
2 January 2025
13:30
Scorecard

| Dhaka Capitals; 174/9 (20 overs) | v | Durbar Rajshahi; 179/3 (18.1 overs) |
| Shahadat Hossain 50 (41); Taskin Ahmed 7/19 (3 overs) | | Anamul Haque 73* (46); Mustafizur Rahman 1/33 (4 overs) |

Durbar Rajshahi won by 7 wickets
Sher-e-Bangla National Cricket Stadium, Dhaka
Umpires: Mahfuzur Rahman (Ban) and Raveendra Wimalasiri (SL)
Player of the match: Taskin Ahmed (Durbar Rajshahi)

- Dhaka Capitals won the toss and elected to bat.
- Taskin Ahmed (Durbar Rajshahi) took the best bowling figures in the BPL.

Match 8
3 January 2025
19:00 (N)
Scorecard

| Khulna Tigers; 173/8 (20 overs) | v | Dhaka Capitals; 153/6 (20 overs) |
| Mahidul Islam Ankon 32 (22); Chaturanga de Silva 2/22 (2 overs) | | Thisara Perera 103* (60); Mehidy Hasan Miraz 3/6 (4 overs) |

Khulna Tigers won by 20 runs
Sher-e-Bangla National Cricket Stadium, Dhaka
Umpires: Gazi Sohel (Ban) and Raveendra Wimalasiri (SL)
Player of the match: Mehidy Hasan Miraz (Khulna Tigers)

- Dhaka Capitals won the toss and elected to field.

Match 11
7 January 2025
13:30
Scorecard

| Dhaka Capitals; 111 (16.3 overs) | v | Rangpur Riders; 113/3 (13.2 overs) |
| Tanzid Hasan 20 (16); Nahid Rana 3/21 (4 overs) | | Alex Hales 44 (27); Mosaddek Hossain 1/13 (1 over) |

Rangpur Riders won by 7 wickets
Sylhet International Cricket Stadium, Sylhet
Umpires: Tanvir Ahmed (Ban) and Raveendra Wimalasiri (SL)
Player of the match: Nahid Rana (Rangpur Riders)

- Rangpur Riders won the toss and elected to field.

Match 14
9 January 2025
18:30 (N)
Scorecard

| Dhaka Capitals; 177/5 (20 overs) | v | Chittagong Kings; 180/3 (19.3 overs) |
| Sabbir Rahman 82* (33); Khaled Ahmed 3/21 (4 overs) | | Usman Khan 55 (33); Mustafizur Rahman 1/23 (4 overs) |

Chittagong Kings won by 7 wickets
Sylhet International Cricket Stadium, Sylhet
Umpires: Morshed Ali Khan (Ban) and Gazi Sohel (Ban)
Player of the match: Khaled Ahmed (Chittagong Kings)

- Chittagong Kings won the toss and elected to field.

Match 16
10 January 2025
19:00 (N)
Scorecard

| Dhaka Capitals; 193/6 (20 overs) | v | Sylhet Strikers; 195/7 (18.4 overs) |
| Litton Das 73 (43); Rahkeem Cornwall 3/27 (4 overs) | | Zakir Hasan 58 (27); Farmanullah 2/37 (4 overs) |

Sylhet Strikers won by 3 wickets
Sylhet International Cricket Stadium, Sylhet
Umpires: Asif Yaqoob (Pak) and Masudur Rahman (Ban)
Player of the match: Zakir Hasan (Sylhet Strikers)

- Dhaka Capitals won the toss and elected to bat.

Match 18
12 January 2025
18:30 (N)
Scorecard

| Dhaka Capitals; 254/1 (20 overs) | v | Durbar Rajshahi; 105 (15.2 overs) |
| Litton Das 125* (55); Shafiul Islam 1/62 (4 overs) | | Ryan Burl 47* (32); Abu Jayed 2/15 (3 overs) |

Dhaka Capitals won by 149 runs
Sylhet International Cricket Stadium, Sylhet
Umpires: Asif Yaqoob (Pak) and Morshed Ali Khan (Ban)
Player of the match: Litton Das (Dhaka Capitals)

- Durbar Rajshahi won the toss and elected to field.

Match 21
16 January 2025
13:30
Scorecard

| Dhaka Capitals; 139 (19.3 overs) | v | Fortune Barishal; 145/2 (16 overs) |
| Tanzid Hasan 62 (44); Tanvir Islam 3/39 (3 overs) | | Tamim Iqbal 61 (48); Thisara Perera 1/25 (3 overs) |

Fortune Barishal won by 8 wickets
Zohur Ahmed Chowdhury Stadium, Chattogram
Umpires: Asif Yaqoob (Pak) and Moniruzzaman (Ban)
Player of the match: Tamim Iqbal (Fortune Barishal)

- Dhaka Capitals won the toss and elected to bat.

Match 27
20 January 2025
13:30
Scorecard

| Dhaka Capitals; 196/6 (20 overs) | v | Sylhet Strikers; 190/7 (20 overs) |
| Litton Das 70 (48); Tipu Sultan 2/26 (4 overs) | | Rony Talukdar 68 (44); Thisara Perera 2/31 (4 overs) |

Dhaka Capitals win by 6 runs
Zohur Ahmed Chowdhury Stadium, Chattogram
Umpires: Morshed Ali Khan (Ban) and Muhammad Kamruzzaman (Ban)
Player of the match: Thisara Perera (Dhaka Capitals)

- Dhaka Capitals won the toss and elected to bat.

Match 29
22 January 2025
13:30
Scorecard

| Chittagong Kings; 148/6 (20 overs) | v | Dhaka Capitals; 149/2 (18.1 overs) |
| Naeem Islam 44 (40); Mosaddek Hossain 2/13 (3 overs) | | Tanzid Hasan 90* 54; Aliss Al Islam 1/18 (4 overs) |

Dhaka Capitals won by 8 wickets
Zohur Ahmed Chowdhury Stadium, Chattogram
Umpires: Gazi Sohel and Muhammad Kamruzzaman
Player of the match: Tanzid Hasan (Dhaka Capitals)

- Chittagong Kings won the toss and elected to bat.

Match 38
29 January 2025
18:30 (N)
Scorecard

| Dhaka Capitals; 73 (15.3 overs) | v | Fortune Barishal; 77/1 (6.3 overs) |
| Thisara Perera 15 (11); Tanvir Islam 3/2 (2 overs) | | Dawid Malan 37* (16); Mustafizur Rahman 1/16 (2 overs) |

Fortune Barishal won by 9 wickets
Sher-e-Bangla National Cricket Stadium, Dhaka
Umpires: Mahfuzur Rahman (Ban) and Sharfuddoula (Ban)
Player of the match: Tanvir Islam (Fortune Barishal)

- Fortune Barishal won the toss and elected to field.

Match 41
1 February 2025
13:30
Scorecard

| Dhaka Capitals; 123/9 (20 overs) | v | Khulna Tigers; 128/4 (16.5 overs) |
| Tanzid Hasan 58 (37); Hasan Mahmud 2/5 (4 overs) | | Mehidy Hasan Miraz 74* (55); Mustafizur Rahman 3/16 (4 overs) |

Khulna Tigers won by 6 wickets
Sher-e-Bangla National Cricket Stadium, Dhaka
Umpires: Morshed Ali Khan (Ban) and Mahfuzur Rahman (Ban)
Player of the match: Mehidy Hasan Miraz (Khulna Tigers)

- Dhaka Capitals won the toss and elected to bat.
