= Graham Clark (English cricketer) =

English cricketer (born 1993)

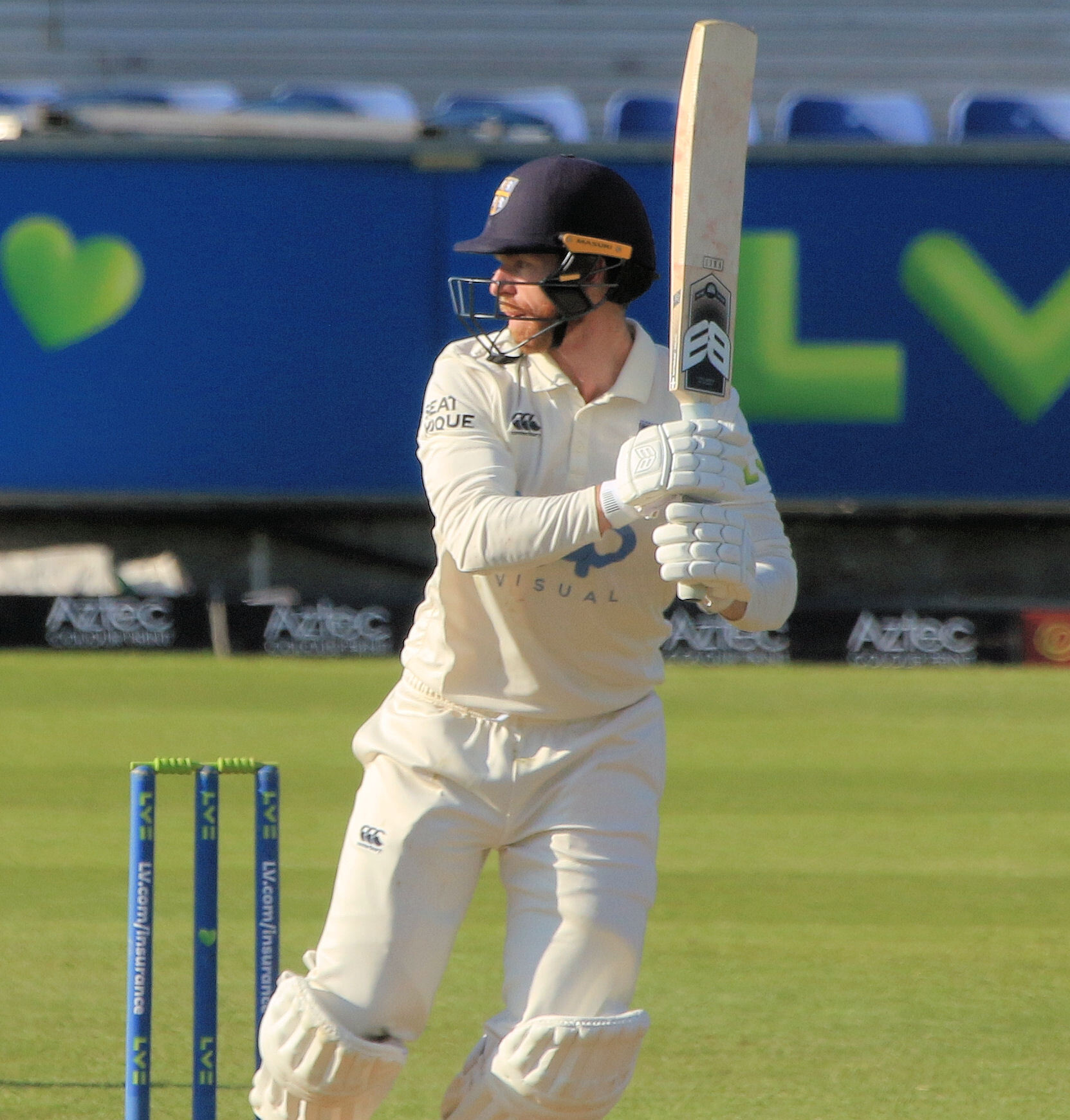
- Clark in 2023

Personal information
- Born: 16 March 1993 (age 33); Whitehaven, Cumbria, England
- Batting: Right-handed
- Bowling: Right-arm leg-break
- Role: Batsman
- Relatives: Jordan Clark (brother)

Domestic team information
- Years: Team
- 2015–present: Durham (squad no. 7)
- 2024–2025: Northern Superchargers
- 2024/25: Chittagong Kings
- First-class debut: 19 July 2015 Durham v Hampshire
- List A debut: 25 July 2015 Durham v Northamptonshire

Career statistics
Competition	FC	LA	T20
Matches	87	58	164
Runs scored	3,872	2,013	3,911
Batting average	30.48	35.94	25.90
100s/50s	6/20	4/11	2/19
Top score	160	141*	102*
Balls bowled	98	54	26
Wickets	3	4	0
Bowling average	19.66	12.50	–
5 wickets in innings	0	0	–
10 wickets in match	0	0	–
Best bowling	1/1	3/18	–
Catches/stumpings	59/–	21/3	57/–
- Source: CricketArchive, 12 September 2026

Graham Clark (born 16 March 1993) is an English cricketer who plays for Durham County Cricket Club. Primarily a right-handed batsman, he also bowls Right-arm leg-break.
