= Tanzim Hasan Sakib =

Bangladeshi cricketer

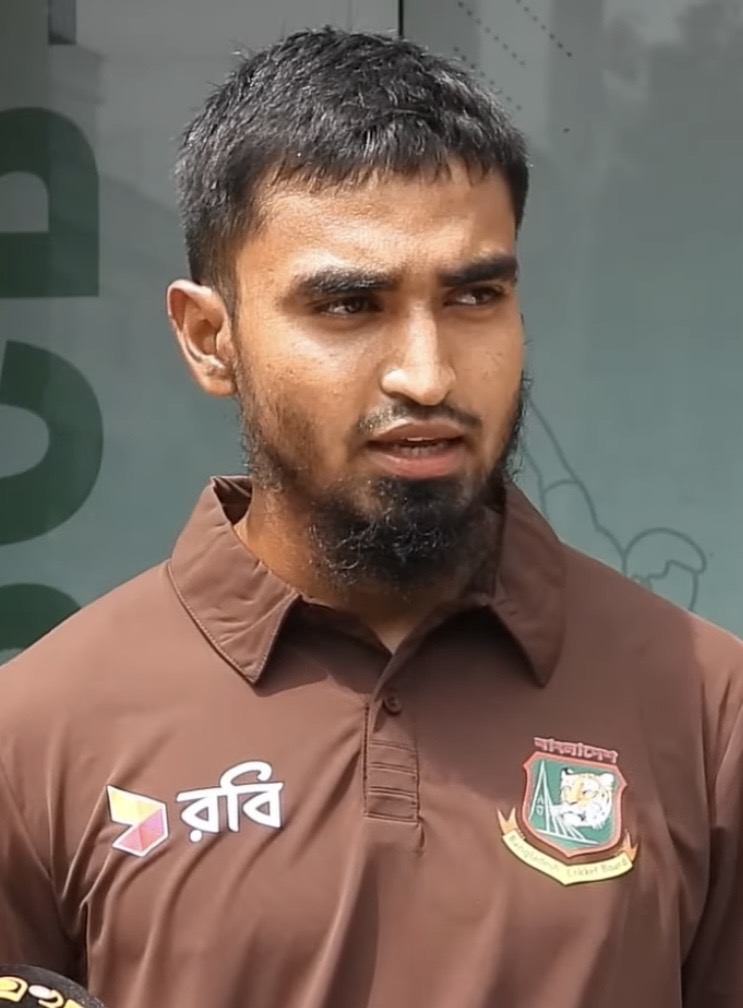
- Sakib in 2024

Personal information
- Born: 20 October 2002 (age 24); Balaganj, Sylhet, Bangladesh
- Height: 5 ft 8 in (173 cm)
- Batting: Right-handed
- Bowling: Right-arm fast-medium
- Role: All-rounder

International information
- National side: Bangladesh (2023–present)
- Only Test (cap 107): 28 April 2025 v Zimbabwe
- ODI debut (cap 145): 15 September 2023 v India
- Last ODI: 5 July 2025 v Sri Lanka
- ODI shirt no.: 41
- T20I debut (cap 89): 27 December 2023 v New Zealand
- Last T20I: 2 October 2025 v Afghanistan

Domestic team information
- Years: Team
- 2021- Present: Sylhet Division
- 2023-2025: Sylhet Strikers (squad no. 9)
- 2026 – present: Rajshahi Warriors

Career statistics
| Competition | ODI | T20I | FC | LA |
|---|---|---|---|---|
| Matches | 15 | 38 | 18 | 68 |
| Runs scored | 151 | 190 | 414 | 341 |
| Batting average | 18.87 | 13.57 | 17.25 | 13.11 |
| 100s/50s | 0/0 | 0/1 | 0/1 | 0/0 |
| Top score | 45 | 50 | 66 | 45 |
| Balls bowled | 683 | 803 | 2045 | 3177 |
| Wickets | 24 | 44 | 29 | 109 |
| Bowling average | 27.29 | 25.09 | 37.93 | 26.65 |
| 5 wickets in innings | 0 | 0 | 1 | 2 |
| 10 wickets in match | 0 | 0 | 0 | 0 |
| Best bowling | 3/14 | 4/7 | 5/53 | 5/23 |
| Catches/stumpings | 4/– | 19/– | 7/– | 26/– |
Medal record
Men's cricket
Representing Bangladesh
ICC U-19 World Cup
| Winner | 2020 South Africa |
- Source: ESPNcricinfo, 27 November 2025

Tanzim Hasan Sakib (Bengali: তানজ়িম হাসান সাকিব; [t̪anzim ɦasan sakib]; born 20 October 2002) is a Bangladeshi cricketer, who is a right-arm fast-medium bowler. He plays for Sylhet Division in domestic cricket.

== Early life ==
Tanzim Hasan Sakib was born on 20 October 2002, in Tilakchanpur village of Sadar Union in Balaganj Upazila of Sylhet. His father is Gauch Ali, and his mother is Selina Begum. He got a talent pool scholarship in the Primary Education Completion (PEC) exam from Adityapur Government Primary School, Balaganj. After that he got admission in Balaganj Government DN Model High School. He is currently studying in Islamic History and Culture Department from University of Dhaka.

== Domestic career ==
Tanzim Hasan Shakib, while studying in class VIII, passed the selection at Moulvibazar District Stadium to form the under-13 national team and after completing a three-month bowling course at the Zahoor Ahmed Chowdhury Stadium in Chittagong, he was admitted to BKSP. While training at BKSP, he played for the Bangladesh national under-17 cricket team in India in 2016 and the under-19 team in England and Sri Lanka in 2019. He qualified in A cricket on 27 March 2019 for the Sports Education Institute cricket team in Dhaka Premier Division Cricket League 2018-19 tournament.

He made his List A debut for Bangladesh Krira Shikkha Protishtan in the 2018–19 Dhaka Premier Division Cricket League on 27 March 2019. In December 2019, he was named in Bangladesh's squad for the 2020 Under-19 Cricket World Cup. He made his first-class debut on 29 March 2021, for Sylhet Division in the 2020–21 National Cricket League. He made his Twenty20 debut on 5 June 2021, for Abahani Limited in the 2021 Dhaka Premier Division Twenty20 Cricket League.

== International career ==
=== ICC Under-19 Cricket World Cup 2022 ===
In December 2021, he was named in Bangladesh's team for the 2022 ICC Under-19 Cricket World Cup in the West Indies. He was then named as a replacement in Bangladesh's team for 2023 Asia Cup.

=== Senior ===
==== 2023-2024 ====
He made his One Day International (ODI) debut on 15 September 2023 against India in 2023 Asia Cup.

In November 2023, he was selected in Bangladesh's squad for their tour to New Zealand. He made his Twenty20 International (T20I) debut for Bangladesh on 27 December 2023, against New Zealand.

==== 2024-2025 ====
In May 2024, he was named in Bangladesh's squad for the 2024 ICC Men's T20 World Cup tournament. As per ESPNCricinfo,"Tanzim bowled a double-wicket maiden and a wicket maiden, and his 21 dot balls were the most by a bowler in a men's T20 World Cup match." Though NZ Lockie Ferguson eventually outshone him. He took 11 wickets in the tournament with 6.20 economy rate. His bowling figure of 4-2-7-4, is the joint 3rd best in 2024 Men's T20 World Cup.

==== 2025-2026 ====
In January 2025, he was named in Bangladesh's squad for the 2025 ICC Champions Trophy.

== Controversy ==
In September 2023, Tanzim Hasan Sakib faced criticism for Facebook posts deemed misogynistic, especially one discouraging women from working. While some defended his right to free speech, he apologized to the BCB, stating he never intended to offend. He denied being a misogynist, saying, "My mother is a woman." Teammate Mehidy Hasan Miraz later clarified that Tanzim realized his mistake but had no misogynistic intent.

In the 2025 BPL, Tanzim Hasan Sakib was banned for two matches for violating the code of conduct. He received a demerit point and a fine for making a remark directed at an opposing batsman during a match against Chittagong Kings. With three previous demerit points, his total reached four, leading to his suspension, which applied only to domestic cricket.
