= Borj =

Borj (Persian: برج) may refer to these places:

== Iran ==
- Borj-e Olya, East Azerbaijan Province
- Borj-e Sofla, East Azerbaijan Province
- Borj-e Dasht Darreh, Fars Province
- Borj-e Delbar, Fars Province
- Borj-e Khankaram, Fars Province
- Borj-e Safar Beg, Fars Province
- Borj-e Seyfollah, Fars Province
- Borj-e Seyyed, Fars Province
- Borj Sukhteh-ye Olya, Fars Province
- Borj Sukhteh-ye Sofla, Fars Province
- Borj, Fahraj, Kerman Province
- Borj, Ekhtiarabad, Kerman Province
- Borj-e Abbasabad, Kerman Province
- Borj, Khuzestan
- Borj-e Ali Shir-e Olya, Kohgiluyeh and Boyer-Ahmad Province
- Borj-e Ali Shir-e Sofla, Kohgiluyeh and Boyer-Ahmad Province
- Borj-e Bahmani, Kohgiluyeh and Boyer-Ahmad Province
- Borj, Markazi
- Borj-e Abbas Khan, Markazi Province
- Borj-e Balan, Markazi Province
- Borj-e Cheshmeh-ye Mahmud, Markazi Province
- Borj Qaqan, Markazi Province
- Borj-e Kheyl, Mazandaran Province
- Borj, North Khorasan (disambiguation)
  - Borj, Bojnord
  - Borj, Esfarayen
  - Borj-e Aqa
  - Borj-e Zanganlu
  - Borj-e Zavalfaqar
- Borj, Razavi Khorasan
- Borj-e Qardash, Razavi Khorasan Province
- Borj-e Zeydanlu, Razavi Khorasan Province
- Borj-e Mirgol, Sistan and Baluchestan Province
- Borj-e Yusef, Sistan and Baluchestan Province
- Borj-e Mohammadan, South Khorasan Province
- Borj-e Ziad, South Khorasan Province

== Morocco ==
Borj is a general name for historical fortifications on hilltops in Morocco.

- Borj Nord, a fortress near the town of Fez, Morocco

== Lebanon ==
- Borj, Akkar District, Akkar Governate
- Borj Rahal, Tyre District, South Governate
- Borj Kalaway, Bint Jbeil District, Nabatieh Governate
- Borj el Chamali, Tyre District, South Governate

== See also ==
- Burj (disambiguation)
