= Burj =

Burj (Arabic: برج, tower), el-Burj, Al Burj, may refer to:

== Places ==
=== India ===
- Burj Kaila, a village in Jalandhar district, Punjab, India
- Burj Pukhta, a village in Jalandhar district, Punjab, India
- Buraj Hassan, a village in Jalandhar district, Punjab, India

=== Iran ===
- Burj, Markazi, a village in Shazand County, Markazi Province
- Borj-e Mohammadan or Burj, a village in Zirkuh County, South Khorasan Province
- Burj-i-Qanat, a village in Sarbisheh County, South Khorasan Province

=== Israel/Palestine ===
- al-Burj, Hebron, a Palestinian village in Hebron Governorate
- al-Burj, Ramle, a Palestinian village in the Ramle Subdistrict, depopulated in 1948
- Khirbat Al-Burj, a depopulated Palestinian village in the Haifa Subdistrict and archeological site
- Khirbat Umm Burj, a Palestinian village in the Hebron Subdistrict, depopulated in 1948

=== Lebanon ===
- Bourj Hammoud, a suburb of northeast Beirut
- Burj el-Shamali, a Palestinian refugee camp near Tyre

=== Pakistan ===
- Burj Attari, a town in the Punjab province of Pakistan
- Burj Jeway Khan, a town in the Punjab province of Pakistan
- Burj Mandi, a village in the Punjab province of Pakistan

=== Syria ===
- al-Burj, al-Bab, a village in Aleppo Governorate
- al-Burj, Idlib, a village in Idlib Governorate
- Burj Islam, a village in the Latakia Governorate
- Burj Qa'i, a village in Homs Governorate

== Buildings ==
=== Dubai, United Arab Emirates ===
- Burj Al Alam, Dubai, a planned skyscraper cancelled in 2013
- Burj Al Arab, Dubai, the world's fourth-tallest hotel
- Burj Al Fattan, Dubai, a planned skyscraper
- Burj Azizi, Dubai, a construction skyscraper
- Burj Jumeirah, Dubai, a planned skyscraper
- Burj Khalifa, Dubai, the current world's tallest building
- Burj al-Taqa, Dubai, an abandoned planned skyscraper
- Burj Vista, Dubai, a residential skyscraper
- Uptown Dubai Tower 1, Dubai, originally Burj 2020, a planned skyscraper
- Nakheel Tower, Dubai, originally Al Burj, a planned skyscraper cancelled in 2009

=== Other cities ===
- Al Burj (Amman), a commercial building in Amman, Jordan
- Burj Doha, a skyscraper in Doha, Qatar
- Burj Al Anoud, a skyscraper in Riyadh, Saudi Arabia
- Burj Rafal, a hotel and residential building in Riyadh, Saudi Arabia
- Fateh Burj, a tower in Chappar Chiri village of Punjab, India
- Musamman Burj, an octagonal tower in Agra Fort, Uttar Pradesh, India
- al-Burj (Tower of Beitin), the ruins of a Crusader tower in Beitin, Ramallah, West Bank, Palestine-Israel

== Other uses ==
- Burj Al Luq Luq, an independent organisation in Jerusalem
- Battle of El Burj (1917), a WW1 battle

== See also ==
- Burg (disambiguation)
- Berg (disambiguation)
- Borg (disambiguation)
- Borj (disambiguation)
- Burji (disambiguation)
- Burgas (disambiguation)
- Pyrgos (disambiguation)
