= Ali Sher =

Ali Sher may refer to:

== People ==
- Ali Sher Khalji, 13th-century governor of Bengal
- Ali Sher Khan Anchan, 17th-century king from Skardu, Baltistan
- Mir Ali Sher Qaune Thattvi, 18th-century historian from Thatta, Sindh
- Alisher Barotov, footballer from Tajikistan
- Alisher Chingizov, 21st-century swimmer from Tajikistan
- Alisher Dodov, 21st-century footballer from Tursunzoda, Tajikistan
- Alisher Dzhalilov, 21st-century footballer from Latakhorak, Tajikistan
- Alisher Gulov, 21st-century taekwondo practitioner from Tajikistan
- Alisher Karamatov, 21st-century rural development activist
- Alisher Mirzo, 20th-century painter from Tashkent, Uzbekistan
- Alisher Mirzoev, 21st-century footballer from Tajikistan
- Alisher Mukhtarov, 21st-century judoka from Uzbekistan
- Alisher Qudratov, 21st-century alpine skier from Tajikistan
- Alisher Rahimov, boxer from Uzbekistan
- Alisher Saipov, Uzbek journalist from Kyrgyzstan
- Alisher Seitov, 21st-century diver from Kazakhstan
- Alisher Tukhtaev, former footballer and coach from Tajikistan
- Alisher Tuychiev, footballer from Tajikistan of Uzbek origin
- Alisher Usmanov, 21st-century Russian oligarch from Uzbekistan
- Alisher Yergali, 21st-century freestyle wrestler from Kazakhstan
- Alisher Zhumakan, 21st-century cyclist from Kazakhstan
- Ali-Shir Nava'i, 15th-century polymath from Herat, Afghanistan
- Jam Ali Sher, medieval ruler of Sindh, present-day Pakistan

== Places ==
- Alışar, Azerbaijan, also spelt as Alisher
- Alisher Navoiy (Tashkent Metro), a railway station in Uzbekistan
- Alisher Navoiy Secondary School (Isfana), a school in Kyrgyzstan
- The Alisher Navoi State Museum of Literature, in Uzbekistan
- Bagh Ali Shir, in Jiroft County, Iran
- Bagh-e Alishir, in Sarduiyeh, Iran
- Borj-e Ali Shir-e Olya, in Dehdasht-e Gharbi, Iran
- Borj-e Ali Shir, in Dehdasht-e Gharbi, Iran
- Tachel Ali Shir, in Shalal and Dasht-e Gol, Iran
- Talambrun Ali Shir, in Shalal and Dasht-e Gol, Iran

== Other uses ==
- Alisher Navoi (film), 1947 Soviet drama film
- Alisher (EP), 2025 extended play by Morgenshtern

== See also ==
- Sher Ali (disambiguation)
