= Borj, North Khorasan =

Borj (Persian: برج) in North Khorasan may refer to:

- Borj, Bojnord
- Borj, Esfarayen
- Borj-e Aqa
- Borj-e Zanganlu
- Borj-e Zavalfaqar
