= Poda Protected Area =

Nature reserve in Bulgaria

Poda
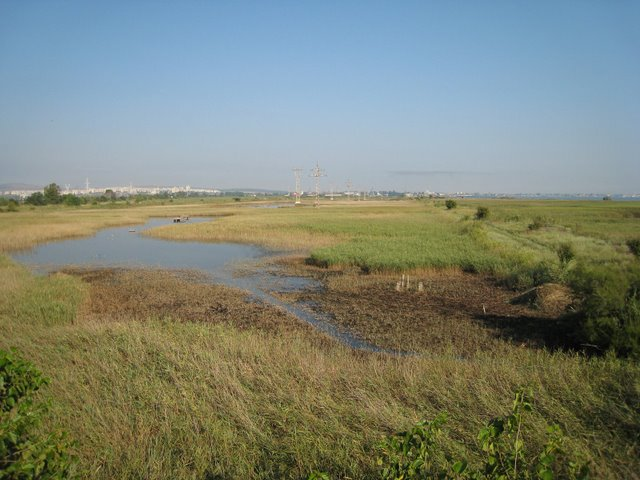
- View from the Nature Center terrace
- Interactive map of Poda
- Location: Bulgaria
- Coordinates: 42°26′38″N 27°27′00″E
- Area: 307 ha (760 acres)

Ramsar Wetland
- Official name: Poda
- Designated: 24 September 2002
- Reference no.: 1228

The nature conservation site Poda was declared a protected area in 1989 by the Bulgarian Ministry of Water and Environment. It was the first protected area in Bulgaria that is completely managed and maintained by a non-governmental organization, the Bulgarian Society for the Protection of Birds (BSPB). BSPB prepares and implements activities adopted by the Council of Minister's Management Plan, but receives its funding completely from entrance fees, souvenirs sold, and donations. Through this arrangement, it aims to be a sustainable model for nature conservation, environmental education, and eco-tourism.

Located south of the port city of Bourgas on the Southeastern Bulgarian Black Sea Coast, Poda is surrounded by the Black Sea and three large lakes - Vaya Lake, Mandra Lake, and Atanasovsko Lake. Along with the protected area Poda, they form a large wetland area called the Burgas Lakes. It is a biologically important area as a resting station for many of the migratory birds who use the Eastern European migratory route, Via Pontica; as well as an important nesting habitat for many breeding species. In 1994, it was classified as a CORINE and in 2002 Poda was included in the Ramsar List of Wetlands of International Importance under the Ramsar Convention. It is proposed to be included in the Natura 2000 network within the natural area Mandra - Poda.

== Ecology ==
Despite occupying a relatively small area, 265 bird species have been observed in the protected area Poda. 46 bird species nest in the area and it is the only location on the Black Sea Coast with a mixed heron breeding colony of spoonbill, glossy ibis, purple heron, grey heron, night heron, great white egret and little egret. Other species breeding in the area are marsh harriers, common terns and little terns, and great cormorants - which have forsaken their usual breeding sites in reed beds and made their nests in the abandoned electrical pylons in the area. Its rich biodiversity is attributed to the three different types of water habitats it contains - brackish, fresh, and hyper-saline salt water. During the winter months in the bay at Poda, pygmy cormorants, a globally endangered species, rest at Poda. Other endangered species in the area at this time are Dalmatian pelicans and white-headed ducks. They share the bay with thousands of coots, pochards, and other ducks. Poda is located along Europe's second largest bird migration route, the Via Pontica. Annually, 75% of the European white stork population (over 250,000), 100% of the white pelican population (over 40,000) and thousands of raptors, waterfowl and song birds can be observed during the months of migration in March-April and August-September.

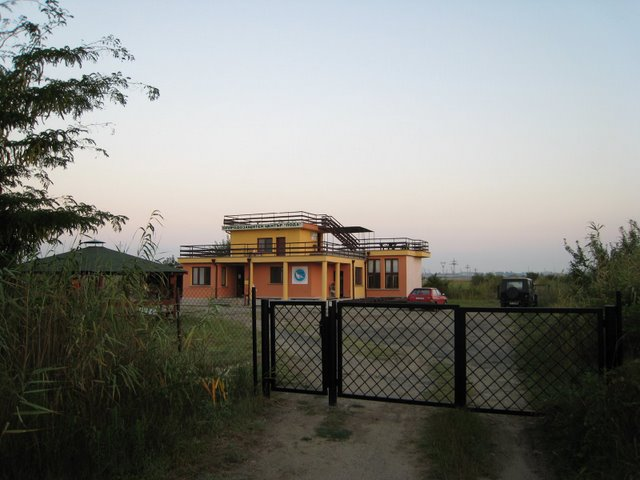
Poda Nature Center

Other rare species of note in the protected area include Bulgaria's largest snake, the four-lined rat-snake (Elaphe sauromates); Europe's smallest mammal, the pygmy white toothed shrew; nutria, which are not native to the area; and a worldwide endangered European otter.

== Tourism ==
To facilitate its mission of environmental education and eco-tourism, BSPB has operated a Nature Conservation Center at Poda since 1997. It is open the entire year and offers lectures on the unique habitats and species in the area to tourists and visiting groups of students. Visitors can use the center's binoculars and telescopes, species identification posters, and nature path with a covered bird hide to observe the different birds in the protected area. Guided tours are given by on-site ornithologists or BSPB volunteers that explain the different habitats and common species found in each. The center receives around 15,000 visitors a year, mostly in the summer.
