= 2025 Chittagong Kings season =

Bangladesh Premier League team season

Chittagong Kings
2025 season
- Coach: Shaun Tait
- Captain: Mohammad Mithun
- Ground(s): Zohur Ahmed Chowdhury Stadium, Chittagong

The 2025 season was the 11th season for the Bangladesh Premier League franchise Chittagong Kings. They were one of the two renamed teams, changing their name from Chattogram Challengers. They are yet to win the title. Their best performance is reaching the final and being runners-up in the 2013 season.

== Season summary ==
Chittagong started their season with a 37-run loss against Khulna Tigers. But after that, they came back strongly and finished the league stage being 2nd in the points table. However, they lost the Qualifier 1 to Fortune Barishal by 9 wickets but defeated Khulna Tigers by 2 wickets in the Qualifier 2 and proceeded to the final.

== Squad ==
Name	Nationality	Batting style	Bowling style	Notes
Batters
Haider Ali	Pakistan	Right-handed		Overseas player
Zubaid Akbari	Afghanistan	Left-handed	Slow left-arm orthodox	Overseas player
Khawaja Nafay	Pakistan	Right-handed	Right-arm off-break	Overseas player
Graham Clark	England	Right-handed	Right-arm medium	Overseas player
Wicket-keepers
Mohammad Mithun	Bangladesh	Right-handed	Right-arm off-break	Captain
Usman Khan	Pakistan	Right-handed		Overseas player
Parvez Hossain Emon	Bangladesh	Left-handed	–	
Lahiru Milantha	United States	Left-handed		Overseas player
All-rounders
~~Shakib Al Hasan~~	Bangladesh	Left-handed	Slow left-arm orthodox	
Rahatul Ferdous	Bangladesh	Left-handed	Slow left-arm orthodox	
~~Moeen Ali~~	England	Left-handed	Right-arm off-break	Overseas player
Hussain Talat	Pakistan	Left-handed	Right-arm fast medium	Overseas player
Shamim Hossain	Bangladesh	Left-handed	Right-arm off-break	
Naeem Islam	Bangladesh	Right-handed	Right-arm off-break	
Marshall Ayub	Bangladesh	Right-handed	Right-arm leg-break	
~~Angelo Mathews~~	Sri Lanka	Right-handed	Right-arm fast medium	Overseas player
Ali Raja	Pakistan	Right-handed	Right-arm fast medium	Overseas player
Tom O'Connell	Australia	Right-handed	Right-arm leg-break	Overseas player
Pace Bowlers
Mohammad Wasim	Pakistan	Right-handed	Right-arm fast medium	Overseas player
Khaled Ahmed	Bangladesh	Right-handed	Right-arm fast medium	
Binura Fernando	Sri Lanka	Right-handed	Left-arm fast-medium	Overseas player
Ifran Hossain	Bangladesh	Right-handed	Right-arm medium	
Shoriful Islam	Bangladesh	Left-handed	Left-arm fast-medium	
Maruf Mridha	Bangladesh	Left-handed	Left-arm fast-medium	
Spin Bowlers
Arafat Sunny	Bangladesh	Left-handed	Slow left-arm orthodox	
Aliss Islam	Bangladesh	Right-handed	Right-arm off-break	
Sheikh Parvez Jibon	Bangladesh	Right-handed	Right-arm off-break	
Nabil Samad	Bangladesh	Left-handed	Slow left-arm orthodox	

== Coaching staff ==
Position	Name
Head coach	Shaun Tait
Assistant coach	Enamul Haque
Team director	Nasir Ahmed
Team manager	Lablur Rahman
Mentor	Shahid Afridi
Batting coach	Mahbubul Alam

== League stage ==
=== Points table ===
Pos	Team	Pld	W	L	NR	Pts	NRR	Qualification
1	Fortune Barishal (C)	12	9	3	0	18	1.302	Advanced to Qualifier 1
2	Chittagong Kings (R)	12	8	4	0	16	1.395	Advanced to Qualifier 1
3	Rangpur Riders (4th)	12	8	4	0	16	0.596	Advanced to Eliminator
4	Khulna Tigers (3rd)	12	6	6	0	12	0.184	Advanced to Eliminator
5	Durbar Rajshahi	12	6	6	0	12	−1.030	
6	Dhaka Capitals	12	3	9	0	6	−0.779	
7	Sylhet Strikers	12	2	10	0	4	−1.340	

Source: ESPNcricinfo & Cricbuzz
(C) Champions; (R) Runners-up

=== Win-loss table ===
Team	1	2	3	4	5	6	7	8	9	10	11	12	Q1	El	Q2	F	Pos.
Chittagong Kings	Khulna; 37 runs	Rajshahi; 105 runs	Dhaka; 7 wickets	Sylhet; 30 runs	Khulna; 45 runs	Rangpur; 33 runs	Barishal; 6 wickets	Rajshahi; 111 runs	Dhaka; 8 wickets	Rangpur; 5 wickets	Sylhet; 96 runs	Barishal; 24 runs	Barishal; 9 wickets	—N/a	Khulna; 2 wickets	Barishal ?	

Team's results→	Won	Tied	Lost	N/R

=== Matches ===
Match 3
31 December 2024
12:00
Scorecard

Khulna Tigers; 203/4 (20 overs)	v	Chittagong Kings; 166/10 (18.5 overs)
Will Bosisto 75* (50); Aliss Islam 2/17 (4 overs)		Shamim Hossain 78 (38); Abu Hider 4/44 (3.5 overs)

Khulana Tigers won by 37 runs
Sher-e-Bangla National Cricket Stadium, Dhaka
Umpires: Tanvir Ahmed (Ban) and Raveendra Wimalasiri (SL)
Player of the match: Mahidul Islam Ankon (Khulna Tigers)

- Chittagong Kings won the toss and elected to field.

Match 7
3 January 2025
14:00
Scorecard

Chittagong Kings; 219/5 (20 overs)	v	Durbar Rajshahi; 114 (17.1 overs)
Usman Khan 123 (62); Taskin Ahmed 2/22 (4 overs)		Mohammad Haris 32 (15); Aliss Islam 3/17 (4 overs)

Chittagong Kings won by 105 runs
Sher-e-Bangla National Cricket Stadium, Dhaka
Umpires: Asif Yaqoob (Pak) and Muhammad Kamruzzaman (Ban)
Player of the match: Usman Khan (Chittagong Kings)

- Durbar Rajshahi won the toss and elected to field.

Match 14
9 January 2025
18:30 (N)
Scorecard

Dhaka Capitals; 177/5 (20 overs)	v	Chittagong Kings; 180/3 (19.3 overs)
Sabbir Rahman 82* (33); Khaled Ahmed 3/21 (4 overs)		Usman Khan 55 (33); Mustafizur Rahman 1/23 (4 overs)

Chittagong Kings won by 7 wickets
Sylhet International Cricket Stadium, Sylhet
Umpires: Morshed Ali Khan (Ban) and Gazi Sohel (Ban)
Player of the match: Khaled Ahmed (Chittagong Kings)

- Chittagong Kings won the toss and elected to field.

Match 19
13 January 2025
13:30
Scorecard

Chittagong Kings; 203/6 (20 overs)	v	Sylhet Strikers; 173/8 (20 overs)
Graham Clark 60 (33); Tanzim Hasan Sakib 2/38 (4 overs)		George Munsey 52 (37); Mohammad Wasim 3/25 (4 overs)

Chittagong Kings won by 30 runs
Sylhet International Cricket Stadium, Sylhet
Umpires: Asif Yaqoob (Pak) and Ali Arman (Ban)
Player of the match: Graham Clark (Chittagong Kings)

- Sylhet Strikers won the toss and elected to field.

Match 22
16 January 2025
18:30 (N)
Scorecard

Chittagong Kings; 200/7 (20 overs)	v	Khulna Tigers; 155/9 (20 overs)
Graham Clark 101 (50); Mohammad Nawaz 3/29 (4 overs)		Darwish Rasooli 37 (31); Arafat Sunny 3/25 (4 overs)

Chittagong Kings won by 45 runs
Zohur Ahmed Chowdhury Stadium, Chattogram
Umpires: Mahfuzur Rahman and Sharfuddoula
Player of the match: Graham Clark (Chittagong Kings)

- Khulna Tigers won the toss and elected to field.

Match 24
17 January 2025
19:00 (N)
Scorecard

Rangpur Riders; 164/7 (20 overs)	v	Chittagong Kings; 131/8 (20 overs)
Khushdil Shah 59 (28); Aliss Islam 2/28 (4 overs)		Shamim Hossain 38 (31); Akif Javed 4/32 (4 overs)

Rangpur Riders won by 33 runs
Zohur Ahmed Chowdhury Stadium, Chattogram
Umpires: Masudur Rahman (Ban) and Sharfuddoula (Ban)
Player of the match: Khushdil Shah (Rangpur Riders)

- Chittagong Kings won the toss and elected to field.

Match 25
19 January 2025
13:30
Scorecard

Chittagong Kings; 121/8 (20 overs)	v	Fortune Barishal; 122/4 (16.5 overs)
Mohammad Mithun 35 (34); Faheem Ashraf 3/12 (4 overs)		Dawid Malan 56* (41); Khaled Ahmed 2/27 (3.5 overs)

Fortune Barishal won by 6 wickets
Zohur Ahmed Chowdhury Stadium, Chattogram
Umpires: Tanvir Ahmed (Ban) and Sharfuddoula (Ban)
Player of the match: Dawid Malan (Fortune Barishal)

- Fortune Barishal won the toss and elected to field.

Match 28
20 January 2025
18:30 (N)
Scorecard

Chittagong Kings; 191/8 (20 overs)	v	Durbar Rajshahi; 80 (14.2 overs)
Naeem Islam 56 (41); Taskin Ahmed 2/23 (4 overs)		Anamul Haque 21 (21); Naeem Islam 2/6 (3 overs)

Chittagong Kings won by 111 runs
Zohur Ahmed Chowdhury Stadium, Chattogram
Umpires: Masudur Rahman (Ban) and Gazi Sohel (Ban)
Player of the match: Naeem Islam (Chittagong Kings)

- Durbar Rajshahi won the toss and elected to field.

Match 29
22 January 2025
13:30
Scorecard

Chittagong Kings; 148/6 (20 overs)	v	Dhaka Capitals; 149/2 (18.1 overs)
Naeem Islam 44 (40); Mosaddek Hossain 2/13 (3 overs)		Tanzid Hasan 90* 54; Aliss Al Islam 1/18 (4 overs)

Dhaka Capitals won by 8 wickets
Zohur Ahmed Chowdhury Stadium, Chattogram
Umpires: Gazi Sohel and Muhammad Kamruzzaman
Player of the match: Tanzid Hasan (Dhaka Capitals)

- Chittagong Kings won the toss and elected to bat.

Match 37
29 January 2025
13:30
Scorecard

Rangpur Riders; 143/5 (20 overs)	v	Chittagong Kings; 148/5 (17.4 overs)
Iftikhar Ahmed 65* (47); Khaled Ahmed 2/44 (4 overs)		Haider Ali 48* (18); Mohammad Saifuddin 2/25 (2 overs)

Chittagong Kings won by 5 wickets
Sher-e-Bangla National Cricket Stadium, Dhaka
Umpires: Morshed Ali Khan (Ban) and Asif Yaqoob (Ban)
Player of the match: Haider Ali (Chittagong Kings)

- Chittagong Kings won the toss and elected to field.

Match 40
30 January 2025
18:30 (N)
Scorecard

Chittagong Kings; 196/8 (20 overs)	v	Sylhet Strikers; 100 (15.2 overs)
Khawaja Nafay 52 (30); Tanzim Hasan Sakib 3/37 (4 overs)		Zakir Hasan 19 (12); Shoriful Islam 4/5 (3.2 overs)

Chittagong Kings won by 96 runs
Sher-e-Bangla National Cricket Stadium, Dhaka
Umpires: Morshed Ali Khan (Ban) and Gazi Sohel (Ban)
Player of the match: Shoriful Islam (Chittagong Kings)

- Sylhet Strikers won the toss and elected to field.

Match 42
1 February 2025
18:30 (N)
Scorecard

Chittagong Kings; 206/4 (20 overs)	v	Fortune Barishal; 182/7 (20 overs)
Parvez Hossain Emon 75 (41); Taijul Islam 2/46 (4 overs)		Dawid Malan 67 (34); Binura Fernando 2/18 (4 overs)

Chittagong Kings won by 24 runs
Sher-e-Bangla National Cricket Stadium, Dhaka
Umpires: Masudur Rahman (Ban) and Raveendra Wimalasiri (SL)
Player of the match: Parvez Hossain Emon (Chittagong Kings)

- Fortune Barishal won the toss and elected to field.

== Playoffs ==
=== Qualifier 1 ===
Match 44
3 February 2025
18:30 (N)
Scorecard

Chittagong Kings; 149/9 (20 overs)	v	Fortune Barishal; 150/1 (17.2 overs)
Shamim Hossain 79 (47); Mohammad Ali 5/24 (4 overs)		Towhid Hridoy 82* (56); Khaled Ahmed 1/34 (4 overs)

Fortune Barishal won by 9 wickets
Sher-e-Bangla National Cricket Stadium, Dhaka
Umpires: Morshed Ali Khan (Ban) and Asif Yaqoob (Pak)
Player of the match: Mohammad Ali (Fortune Barishal)

- Fortune Barishal won the toss and elected to field.

=== Qualifier 2 ===
Match 45
5 February 2025
18:30 (N)
Scorecard

Khulna Tigers; 163/6 (20 overs)	v	Chittagong Kings; 164/8 (20 overs)
Shimron Hetmyer 63 (33); Binura Fernando 2/27 (4 overs)		Khawaja Nafay 57 (46); Musfik Hasan 3/32 (3 overs)

Chittagong Kings won by 2 wickets
Sher-e-Bangla National Cricket Stadium, Dhaka
Umpires: Gazi Sohel (Ban) and Raveendra Wimalasiri (Ban)
Player of the match: Aliss Islam (Chittagong Kings)

- Chittagong Kings won the toss and elected to field.

=== Final ===
Match 46
7 February 2025
19:00 (N)
Scorecard

Chittagong Kings; 194/3 (20 overs)	v	Fortune Barishal; 195/7 (19.3 overs)
Parvez Hossain Emon 78* (49); Mohammad Ali 1/21 (4 overs)		Tamim Iqbal 54 (29); Shoriful Islam 4/34 (4 overs)

Fortune Barishal won by 3 wickets
Sher-e-Bangla National Cricket Stadium, Dhaka
Umpires: Masudur Rahman (Ban) and Gazi Sohel (Ban)
Player of the match: Tamim Iqbal (Fortune Barishal)

- Fortune Barishal won the toss and elected to field.
- Mushfiqur Rahim (Fortune Barishal) scored his 6,000th run in T20s.

== Music ==
"Jaago Chittagong Kings" is the official theme song of the Chittagong Kings cricket team. The song was produced by DJ AKS. The tune was composed by Sajib Das, with vocals and lyrics by Raju and Enu Syed.

== Controversies ==
There was a payment-related issue with Chittagong Kings, as some player's cheques were bounced back several times. However, their owner acknowledged the issue, stating that he was withholding payment due to lack of self-satisfaction.
