= Ali Haidar =

Ali Haidar (Arabic: علي حيدر) or similar spellings, is a male Muslim given name, meaning "Ali the lion", in reference to the reputed bravery of the fourth caliph, Ali. Notable bearers of the name include:

== People ==
- Ali Haidar (basketball) (born 1990), Canadian basketball player of Lebanese origin
- Ali Haidar (poet) (1690–1785), Punjabi Sufi poet
- Ali Haidar (politician) (born 1962), Syrian politician
- Ali Haidar (VC) (1913–1999), Pakistani WW2 soldier
- Ali Haidar Pasha (1866–1935), Ottoman politician and Emir and Grand Sharif of Mecca 1916–17
- Ali Haider (singer) (born 1967), Pakistani singer and actor
- Ali Haider Tabatabai (1854–1933), Urdu poet, translator and scholar of languages
- Ali Haider Zaidi, Pakistani politician
- Ali Haider Khan (1900–1963), Bengali noble, Nawab and Minister in British India
- Ali Haydar Hakverdi (born 1979), Turkish politician
- Ali Haydar Konca (born 1950), Turkish politician
- Ali Haydar Saltık (1923–2011), Turkish general
- Ali Haydar Şen (born 1939), Turkish sports administrator
- Ali Haydar (Syrian army officer) (1932–2022), Syrian army officer

== Other uses ==
- BNS Ali Haider, ships of the Bangladesh Navy

== See also ==
- Haidar Ali (disambiguation)
- Ali Sher (disambiguation)
