= Sherali =

Sherali (Cyrillic: Шерали) is a Central Asian masculine given name, a variant of Sher Ali. Notable people with the name include:

- Sherali Dostiev (born 1985), Tajikistani boxer
- Sherali Bozorov (born 1981), Tajikistani judoka
- Sherali Joʻrayev, Uzbek singer, songwriter, poet, and actor
- Sherali Juraev (born 1986), Uzbekistani judoka
- Sherali Khayrulloyev, Tajikistani general
- Sherali Mirzo, Minister of Defense of Tajikistan
- Sher Ali Bacha (1935–1998), Pashtun revolutionary leader
- Sher Ali Afridi (died 1873), the Pashtun prisoner who killed the British Viceroy of India
