= Burgas (disambiguation) =

Burgas is the capitol city of Burgas Province, Bulgaria.
Related are:

- Burgas Peninsula, a peninsula of Livingston Island in Antarctica, associated with the company Ocean Fisheries – Burgas
- In or near the Bulgarian city and the Black Sea:
  - Gulf of Burgas
  - Burgas Lakes or Wetlands, a group of coastal lakes of varying saltiness
    - Lake Burgas
  - Burgas Airport
  - Spirit of Burgas, a summer music festival
  - PFC Burgas, an association football club (soccer team)

Burgas, Burgaz or Bourgas may elsewhere refer to :

- Burgazada, an island in the Sea of Marmara, near Istanbul
  - Burgazada Synagogue
- A town in Turkey near the former Ancient city and bishopric of Bria, in Phrygia
- As Burgas, hot springs in Ourense, Spain
- Lüleburgaz, a town in European Turkey (Thrace).
- The central neighborhood of Güzelyalı, Bursa

== See also ==
- Pyrgos (disambiguation)
- Burj (disambiguation)
