= Salt Museum, Pomorie =

Museum in Pomorie, Bulgaria

Salt Museum
- Музей на солта
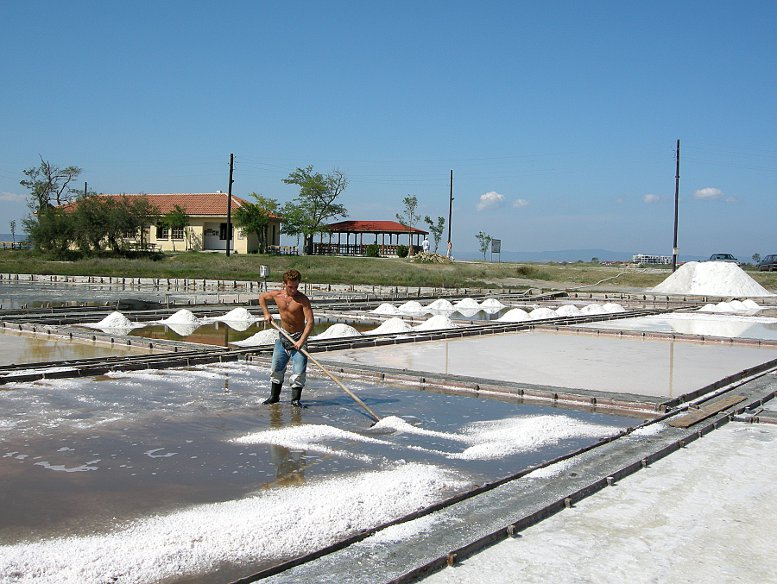
- The salt pans with the museum building

- Location within Bulgaria
- Established: 7 September 2002
- Location: Pomorie, Bulgaria
- Coordinates: 42.565556°N 27.631667°E
- Type: Historical
- Website: saltmuseum.bg

The Salt Museum in Pomorie is a specialized outdoor museum – visitors may see both the museum building and the 20 decares of salt-pans adjacent to the museum, where salt is still being produced. The museum showcases the ancient Anchialos method for salt production and in particular sea salt. It is dedicated to the production of salt through solar evaporation of seawater. This is the only salt museum in Southeast Europe.

The production of sea salt was the main livelihood and wealth of Pomorie in the Middle Ages. There is evidence and it can be assumed that the ancient colony Anchialos of Apollonia, Thrace originated in the 5th century BC, around the extraction of sea salt. In all probability, the tradition is connected and transferred from the ancient and neighboring Solnitsata.

The Pomorie salt pans were a major supplier of salt to Constantinople and the Byzantine Empire, where Thessaloniki was an alternative center. It was not until the Middle Ages that the extraction of rock salt began in Salina Turda.

The concessionaire of the Pomorie salt pans in the 16th century was Michael Kantakouzenos Şeytanoğlu, known by his Ottoman nickname "son of Satan" as Archon of Constantinople under Suleiman the Magnificent, and as a cousin of Russia's first tsar, Ivan the Terrible.

== See also ==
- History of salt
- Lake Pomorie
- Battle of Achelous (917)
