= M. Anwar Hossain (admiral) =

Bangladeshi Navy admiral

Mohammad Anwar Hossain
- Allegiance: Bangladesh
- Branch: Bangladesh Navy; Bangladesh Coast Guard
- Service years: 1988 – 2025
- Rank: Rear Admiral
- Commands: Commander, BNS Ali Haider; Commander, Khulna Naval Area (COMKHUL); Commodore, SWADS; Deputy Director General of Bangladesh Coast Guard; Assistant Chief of Naval Staff (Operations)
- Conflicts: UNIFIL
- Awards: Nou Gourobh Padak (NGP)

M Anwar Hossain NGP, PCGM, BCGMS, ndc, afwc, psc is a retired Bangladesh Navy officer who served as assistant chief of naval staff (operation). He previously served as deputy director general of the Bangladesh Coast Guard and commander of Khulna Naval Area.

== Career ==
Hossain was commissioned in the Bangladesh Navy on 1 January 1988.

Every year from 2011 through 2019, he participated in the annual bilateral Cooperation Afloat Readiness and Training exercises conducted with the United States Navy. He was commanding officer of the guided missile frigate BNS Ali Haider in May 2014, when it deployed as part of the maritime task force (MTF) of the United Nations Interim Force in Lebanon (UNIFIL).

Since promotion to flag rank, Hossain has held appointments as deputy director general of the Bangladesh Coast Guard, and commander of Khulna Naval Area.

He served on Khulna Shipyard Ltd's board of directors through April 2023.

== Personal life ==
Anwar Hossain is married to Lubna Anwar. They have two children; one son and one daughter.
