= Pomorie =

Pomorie Поморие
- Town
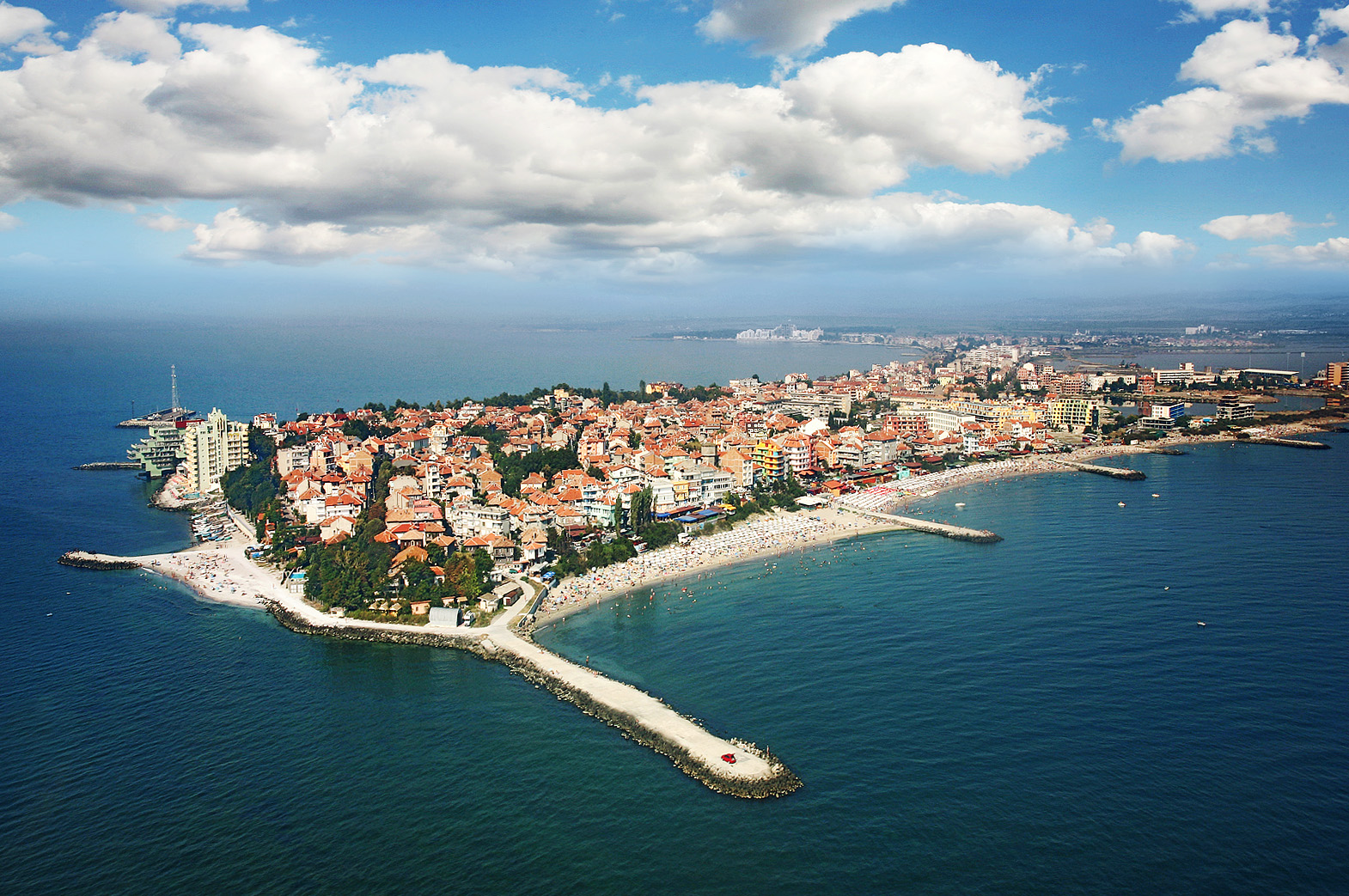
- Aerial view of Pomorie

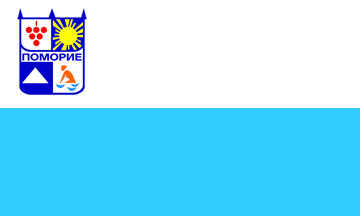
- Flag Coat of arms

- Location of Pomorie
- Coordinates: 42°34′6″N 27°37′0″E
- Country: Bulgaria
- Province: Burgas

Government
  - Mayor: Ivan Aleksiev (GERB)
- Elevation: 0 m (0 ft)

Population (2020)
  - Total: 13,926
- Time zone: UTC+2 (EET)
  - Summer (DST): UTC+3 (EEST)
- Postal Code: 8200

Pomorie (Bulgarian: Поморие [poˈmɔriɛ]), historically known as Anchialos (Bulgarian: Анхиало, Greek: Αγχίαλος), is a town and seaside resort in southeastern Bulgaria, located on a narrow rocky peninsula in Burgas Bay on the southern Bulgarian Black Sea Coast.

It is situated in Burgas Province, 20,5 km away from the city of Burgas and 18 km from the Sunny Beach resort. The ultrasaline lagoon Lake Pomorie, the northernmost of the Burgas Lakes, lies in the immediate proximity. The town is the administrative centre of the eponymous Pomorie Municipality.

Pomorie is an ancient city and today is an important tourist destination. As of 2020, it had a population of 13,926.

== Geography ==
=== Topography ===
The modern city of Pomorie is located on a narrow peninsula of the same name, extending 3.5 km into the Black Sea, on the northwest coast of the Burgas Bay. From the south, east and northeast, the city is surrounded by the sea, from the north - by Lake Pomorie, and only from the west-northwest it is connected to the Pomorie field, which is part of the Burgas lowland.

The sea coast is low, sandy, with an open horizon to the east and west, protected to the north by Stara Planina. Pomorie Bay has 18,700 sq.m. of beaches. The seabed is shallow, with a gentle slope, without reefs and cold sea currents, and is safe for swimming.

=== Climate ===
Under the Köppen climate classification, Pomorie has a humid subtropical climate (Köppen: Cfa). The summertime in Pomorie lasts about five months from mid-May until late September. Average temperatures during high season is 24 °C (75 °F). Summertime sea temperatures stay around 23–24 °C (73–75 °F) at sunrise and go up to 29–30 °C (84–86 °F) at dawn, averaging 26 °C (79 °F). Winters are milder compared with the inland part of the country, with average temperatures of 4–5 °C (39–41 °F) and below 0 °C (32 °F) during the night. Snow is possible in December, January, February and rarely in March; however, it can quickly melt. The highest temperature was recorded in June 2007, at 42.8 °C (109 °F) and the lowest at −21.6 °C (−7 °F) in January 1942.

Climate data for Pomorie, Bulgaria (1991-2020)
| Month | Jan | Feb | Mar | Apr | May | Jun | Jul | Aug | Sep | Oct | Nov | Dec | Year |
|---|---|---|---|---|---|---|---|---|---|---|---|---|---|
| Record high °C (°F) | 20.1 (68.2) | 23.2 (73.8) | 27.3 (81.1) | 31.8 (89.2) | 34.9 (94.8) | 42.8 (109.0) | 41.3 (106.3) | 41.7 (107.1) | 36.2 (97.2) | 34.0 (93.2) | 27.2 (81.0) | 22.8 (73.0) | 42.8 (109.0) |
| Mean daily maximum °C (°F) | 4.8 (40.6) | 6.4 (43.5) | 9.5 (49.1) | 14.1 (57.4) | 19.8 (67.6) | 24.6 (76.3) | 27.5 (81.5) | 27.3 (81.1) | 23.6 (74.5) | 18.9 (66.0) | 13.1 (55.6) | 7.6 (45.7) | 16.4 (61.5) |
| Daily mean °C (°F) | 1.7 (35.1) | 2.8 (37.0) | 5.4 (41.7) | 10.1 (50.2) | 15.7 (60.3) | 20.2 (68.4) | 23.0 (73.4) | 23.0 (73.4) | 19.3 (66.7) | 14.5 (58.1) | 9.5 (49.1) | 4.5 (40.1) | 12.5 (54.5) |
| Mean daily minimum °C (°F) | −1.5 (29.3) | −0.6 (30.9) | 1.7 (35.1) | 5.8 (42.4) | 10.7 (51.3) | 15.1 (59.2) | 17.4 (63.3) | 17.1 (62.8) | 14.4 (57.9) | 10.4 (50.7) | 5.9 (42.6) | 1.2 (34.2) | 8.1 (46.6) |
| Record low °C (°F) | −21.6 (−6.9) | −19.5 (−3.1) | −15.0 (5.0) | −1.5 (29.3) | 2.2 (36.0) | 6.0 (42.8) | 10.2 (50.4) | 10.9 (51.6) | 4.0 (39.2) | −1.2 (29.8) | −9.6 (14.7) | −15.0 (5.0) | −21.6 (−6.9) |
| Average precipitation mm (inches) | 38 (1.5) | 36 (1.4) | 32 (1.3) | 39 (1.5) | 48 (1.9) | 48 (1.9) | 33 (1.3) | 25 (1.0) | 31 (1.2) | 45 (1.8) | 51 (2.0) | 47 (1.9) | 473.0 (18.62) |
| Average precipitation days | 8.1 | 7.5 | 8.1 | 9.7 | 9.2 | 9.1 | 6.1 | 4.7 | 5.3 | 6.6 | 9.0 | 9.1 | 92.6 |
| Average relative humidity (%) | 80.2 | 77.6 | 75.3 | 76.4 | 76 | 73.4 | 70.9 | 71.4 | 72.2 | 77.1 | 79.2 | 80.6 | 75.9 |
| Mean monthly sunshine hours | 76 | 110 | 147 | 207 | 278 | 302 | 339 | 323 | 264 | 185 | 118 | 63 | 2,412 |
| Average ultraviolet index | 1 | 2 | 4 | 5 | 7 | 8 | 9 | 8 | 5 | 4 | 2 | 1 | 4.7 |
Source: stringmeteo.com

== History ==
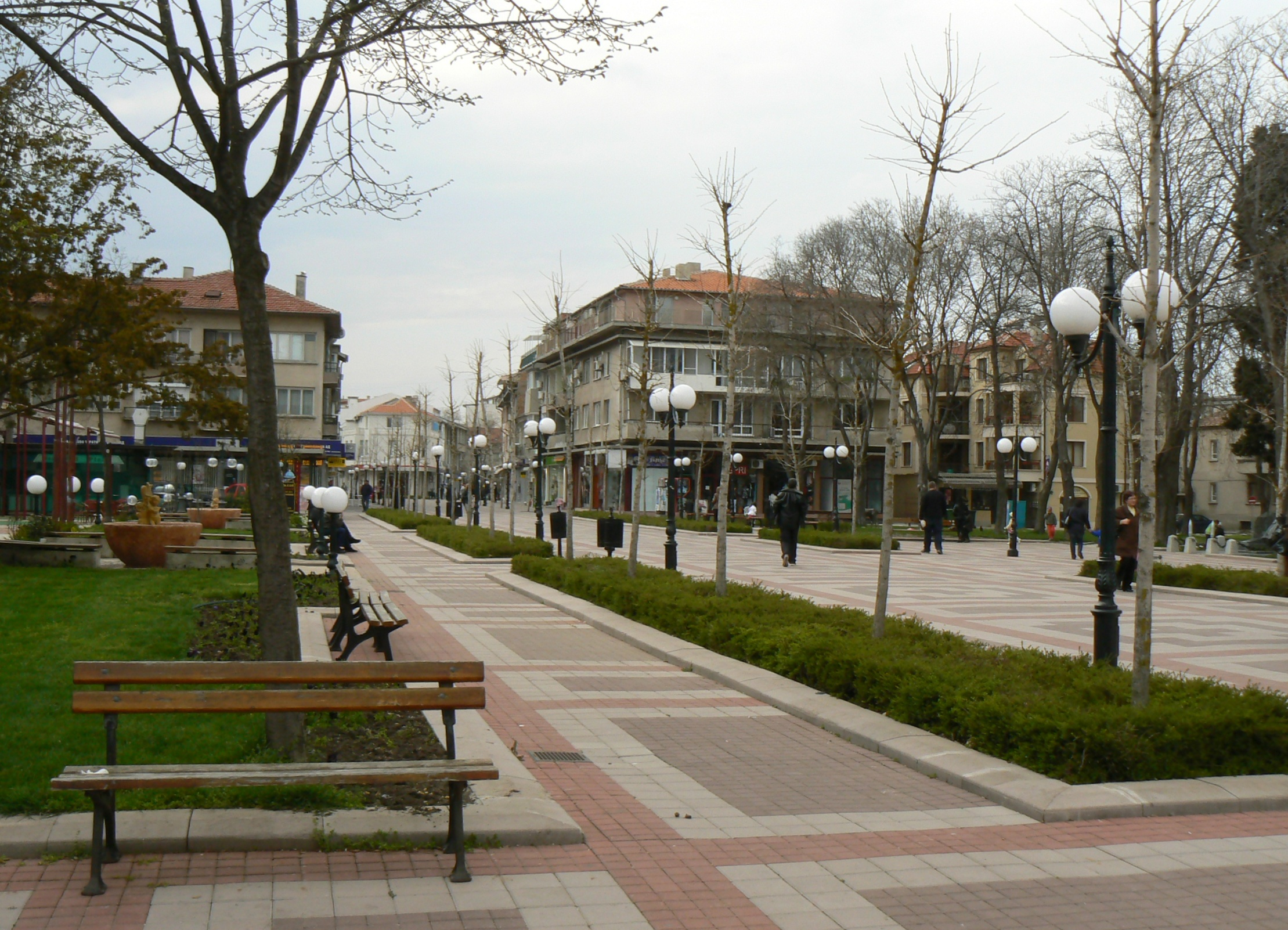
Centre of Pomorie

Pomorie was founded by the Ancient Greeks under the name Anchialos (Ancient Greek: Ἀγχίαλος), deriving from Ancient Greek "anchi-" ("near, close to") and "hals-" ("sea"). In Latin, this was rendered as Anchialus. The Bulgars called the town Tuthon, though its more common name in Bulgarian was Анхиало, Anhialo based on the Greek name. During the Ottoman rule, the town was called Ahyolu. In 1934 the town was renamed to Pomorie, from the Bulgarian "po-" (in this context "by, next to") and "more" ("sea"), corresponding to the etymology of the original Greek name.

=== Ancient Greek colony and Roman centre ===
Possibly founded in the 5th or 4th century BC as a colony of Apollonia (today Sozopol), Anchialos was mentioned in Strabo's Geographica as a small town. It was briefly captured by Messembria (Nesebar) in the 2nd century BC, but reconquered by Apollonia and its fortified walls destroyed.

The western Black Sea coast was ultimately conquered by the Romans under Marcus Licinius Crassus in 29-28 BC after continuous campaigns in the area since 72-71. The fortified wall was meanwhile rebuilt, as evidenced by Ovid in 9 AD en route to Tomis. In the early 1st century AD Anchialos was the centre of a strategia of the vassal Odrysian kingdom, and the town had a Thracian population in the 6th century AD according to the early Byzantine historian Procopius. As the Odrysian kingdom's self-independence was abolished in 45 AD, Anchialos became part of the Roman province of Thrace and was formally proclaimed a city under Emperor Trajan. At the time the city controlled a vast territory bordering that of Augusta Trajana (Stara Zagora) and reaching the Tundzha to the west, bordering that of Messembria to the north and the southern shore of Lake Burgas to the south. Anchialos acquired the appearance of a Roman city and thrived in the 2nd and 3rd century under the Severan Dynasty, serving as the most important import and export station of Thrace.

=== Early Byzantine rule ===
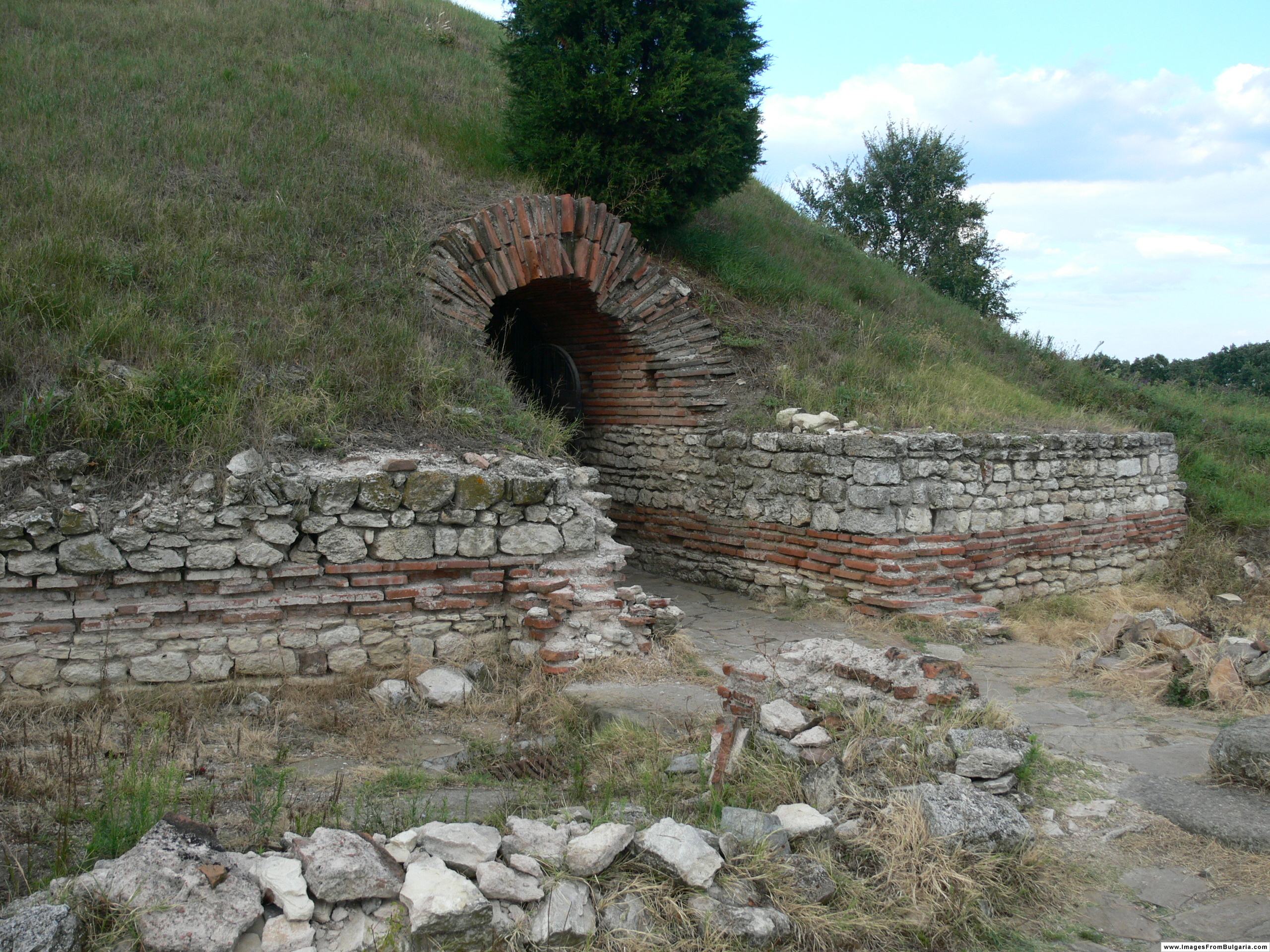
Pomorie's ancient Thracian tomb

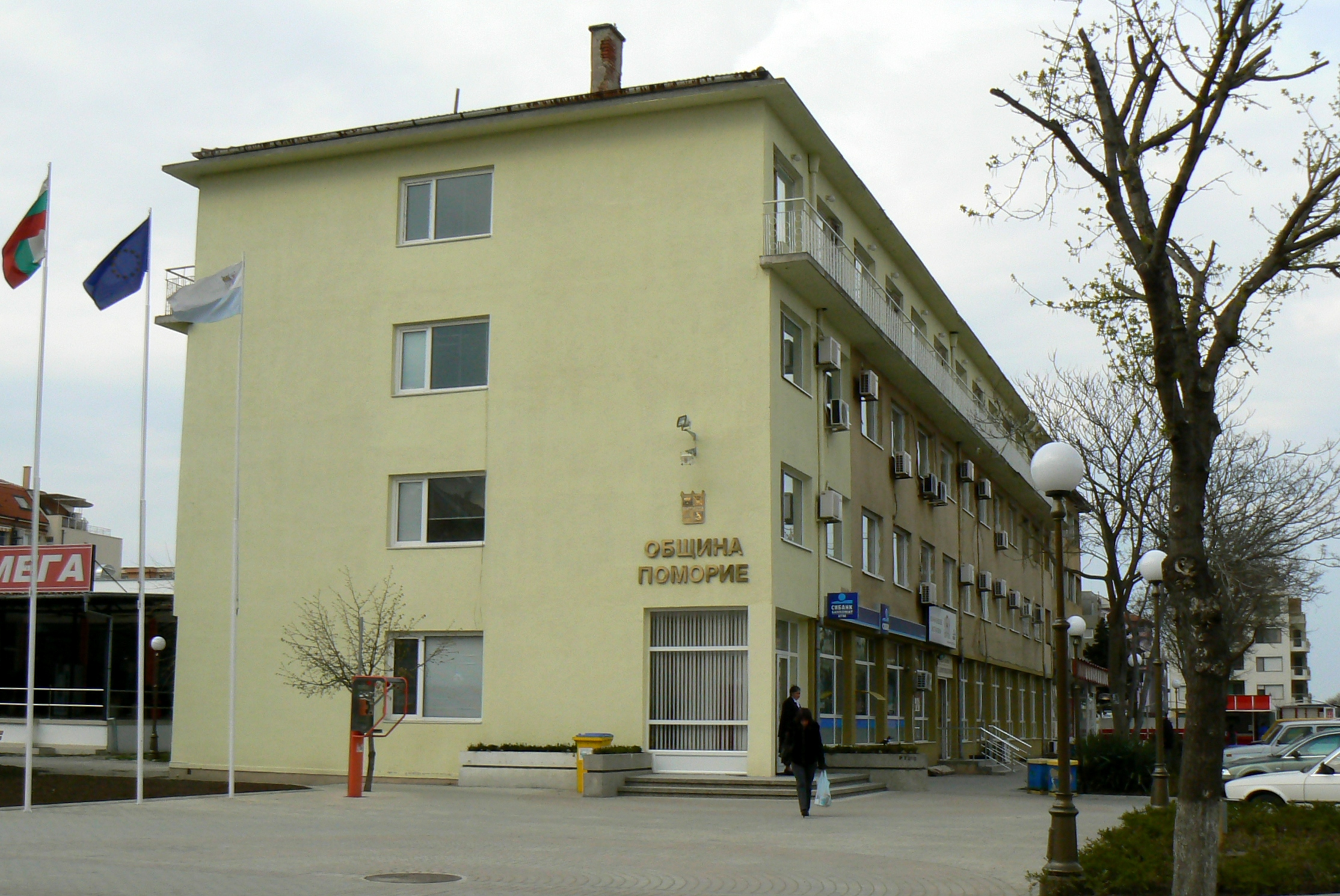
Building of Pomorie Municipality in 2010

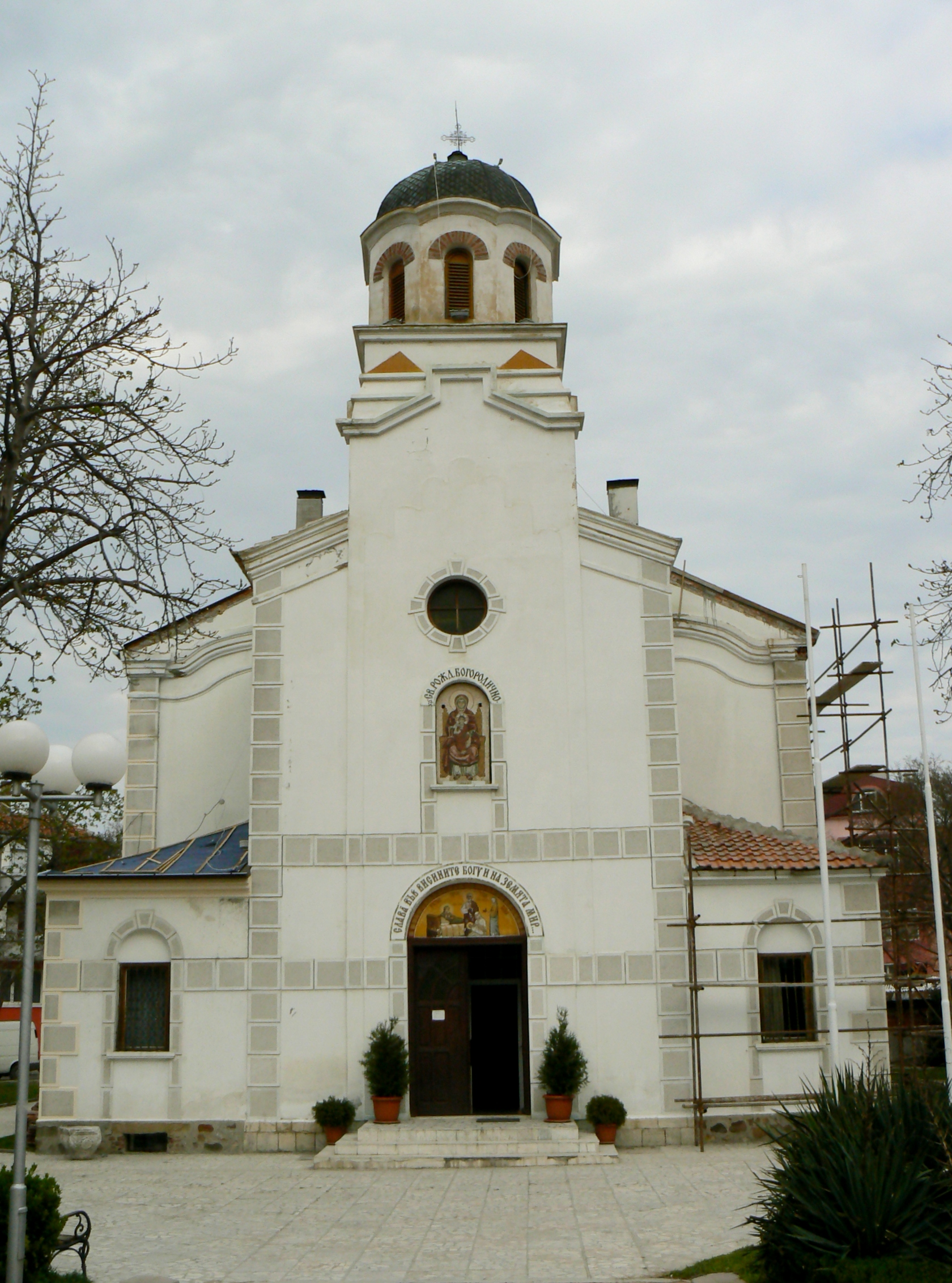
Nativity of Theotokos Church in 2010

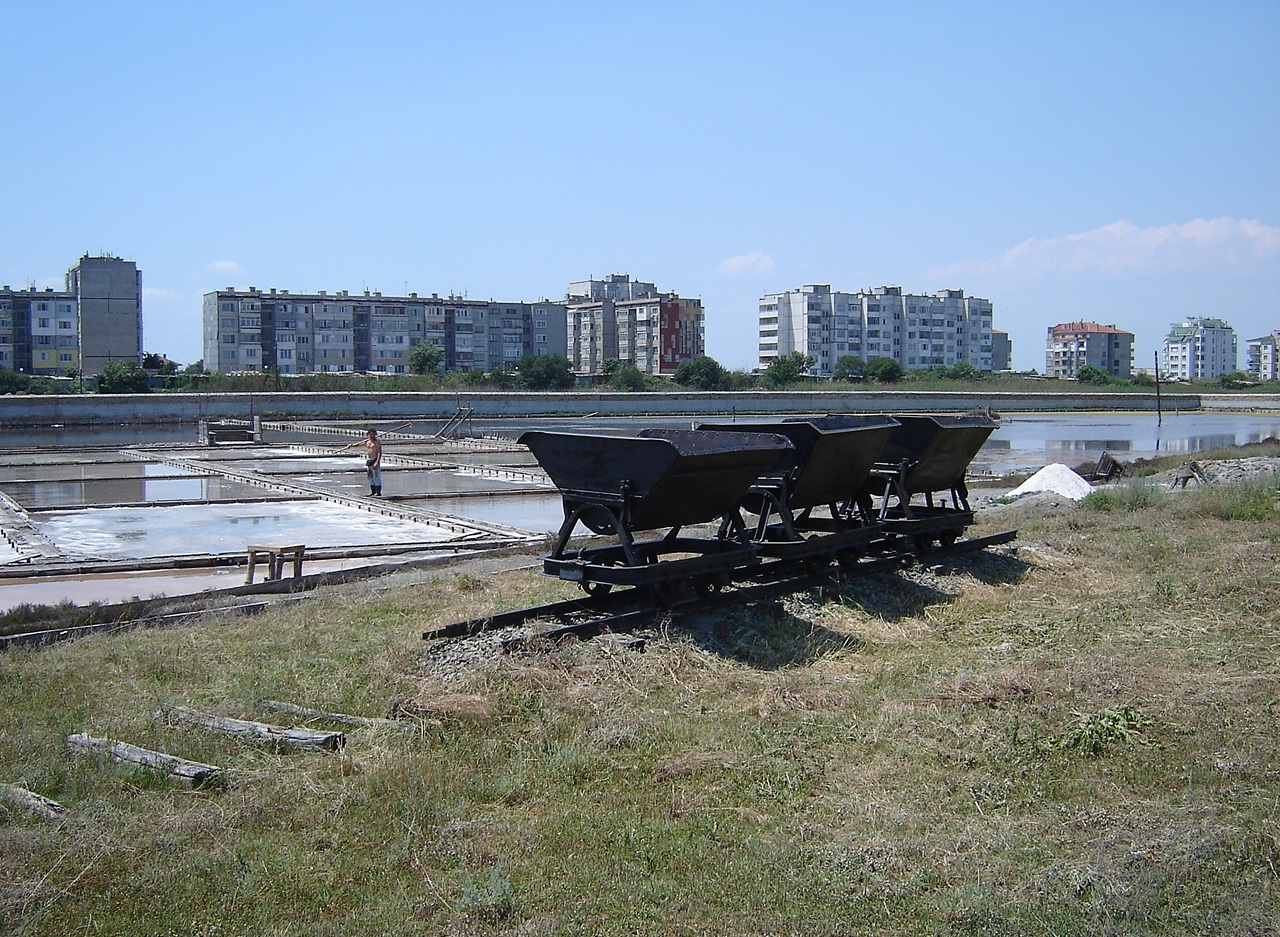
Pomorie salt works

However, the invasion of barbarian tribes from the north meant an end to this prosperity in the middle of the 3rd century, with the Goths briefly capturing Anchialos around 270. Diocletian stayed in the city between 28 and 30 October 294. His and Constantine the Great's reforms restored the city's prosperity for a while, as the proximity to the new capital of Constantinople made Anchialos a key food supply centre.

Theodoric the Great passed through the city in 476 on the way to Adrianople. A high-ranking Byzantine general named Vitalian in 513 revolted in the region and briefly took control of Anchialos and the neighbouring cities to use their fleet in his attack of Constantinople until he was crushed in 515. While writing about the Goths in 551, Jordanes recommended the baths outside the town as "among the innumerable hot springs of the world they are esteemed as specially famous and efficacious for their healing virtues."

The bishopric of Anchialus was originally a suffragan of the metropolitan see of Hadrianopolis in Haemimonto, capital of the Roman province of Haemimontus. However, the Notitiae Episcopatuum of Pseudo-Epiphanius, written in the reign of Byzantine Emperor Heraclius (c. 640), gives it as an autocephalous archbishopric, today listed by the Catholic Church as a titular see. The first bishop of the see whose name is known is 2nd-century Sotas, mentioned by Eusebius of Caesarea as an adversary of Montanism. Timotheus was at the Council of Sardica in 343/344. Sebastianus was one of the bishops at the First Council of Constantinople of 381. Sabbatius was a signatory of the decree of the Patriarch of Constantinople against simoniacs in 459. Paulus was at the Second Council of Constantinople in 553. Jacobus was a contemporary of Patriarch Tarasios of Constantinople. Nicolaus was at the Photian Council of Constantinople (879). No longer a residential bishopric, Anchialus is today listed by the Catholic Church as a titular see.

The Slavic and Avar invasion in 584 meant Anchialos was conquered and its fortifications were destroyed. Avar Khagan Bayan turned the city into his residence for a few months and concluded a peace treaty with the Byzantines. At the eve of his campaigns, the emperor Maurice visited the city to oversee reconstruction.

=== Byzantine and Bulgarian rule ===
After 681 and the formation of the First Bulgarian Empire to the north Anchialos played an important role in many conflicts between the two empires. In 708 the forces of Justinian II were completely defeated near the fortress by the army of Bulgar Khan Tervel. On 30 June 763 the Bulgars under Telets suffered a defeat by the Byzantine army of Constantine V. On 21 June 766 the same emperor's fleet of 2,600 heavy ships sank en route to Anchialos, where Constantine was waiting, and most soldiers drowned, forcing him to return to Constantinople.

In May 783 Irene undertook a demonstrative campaign across Thrace and restored Anchialos' destroyed fortifications. The city was first conquered by the Bulgarian Empire in 812, under Khan Krum, who settled Slavs and Bulgars in Anchialos. The Byzantines restored their control over the city and the area in 864.

The Battle of Anchialus took place near the city on 20 August 917, and was one of Tsar Simeon the Great's greatest military achievements. Simeon's army routed the considerably larger Byzantine forces under Leo Phocas. Bulgaria retained the city until 971, when the Byzantine Empire reconquered it and held it for two centuries as Bulgaria was subjugated. After the restoration of the Bulgarian state Anchialos changed hands several times until it was captured by the Venetian knights of Amadeus VI, Count of Savoy in October 1366. The next year it was ceded to Byzantium.

=== Ottoman rule ===
After the Ottoman invasion of the Balkans in the 14th century, Anchialos remained a Byzantine bulwark until submission in 1453 together with Constantinople. Whilst under Ottoman administration, it became the centre of a kaza also encompassing the area around Sozopol as "Ahyolu". It was the centre of an eparchy of the Patriarchate of Constantinople and continued to act as a cultural, religious, economic and administrative centre of the region until the early 19th century, as many noble Byzantine families settled after 1453. Two Patriarchs of Constantinople stem from the city—Michael III of Anchialus (1170–1178) and Jeremias II Tranos (1572–1579, 1580–1584, 1587–1595).

Already before 1819 many prominent locals joined the Greek patriotic organization Filiki Eteria. At the outbreak of the Greek War of Independence (1821) a part of the town's representatives, priests as well as the Orthodox bishop Eugenios were executed by the Ottoman authorities. During the Russo-Turkish War of 1828-1829 Anchialos was captured by the Russian forces on 11 July 1829 and held for a year. At the time it was mainly inhabited by Greeks, with minorities of Bulgarians and Turks, had a population of 5,000-6,000, six Orthodox churches and a mosque. After the Russian forces withdrew the whole of what is today Eastern Bulgaria gradually depopulated, with many people fleeing to the Christian lands to the north. Pomorie's St George's Monastery was founded in 1856. It was a kaza centre in İslimye sanjak of Edirne Province before 1878 as "Ahyolu".

=== Part of Bulgaria ===
Anchialos was liberated from Ottoman rule on 27 January 1878 and became part of Eastern Rumelia as a kaza centre in Burgaz sanjak until Bulgaria unified in 1885. At the turn of the 20th century Anchialos was a town of about 6,000 inhabitants of which 82% were Greeks. Pomorie was one of the predominantly Greek-inhabited towns in Bulgaria that were affected by anti-Greek pogroms in early 1900s. The local Greek community was already targeted by the Bulgarian authorities from early 1905. The town was burnt down in July, 1906, and over 300 Greeks were murdered. The perpetrators were Bulgarian refugees from the region of Macedonia as a response to the massacre of the Bulgarian inhabitants of the village of Zagorichani by Greek militants. In addition to political reasons there were also economic motives. The Bulgarian authorities were accused by most European governments due to this turn of events. The destruction of the town was compared by contemporary European diplomacy to the anti-Jewish pogroms in Russia.

The town accommodated many Bulgarian refugees from Eastern Thrace, mainly from around Lozengrad after World War I, who replaced the Greeks who had fled in the first decade of the 20th century; in 1906 they founded Nea Anchialos in Greece. During the 19th and 20th century it gradually lost most of its importance in the southern Bulgarian Black Sea Coast at the expense of rapidly developing Burgas. It established itself as a centre of wine and salt production and was renamed Pomorie in 1934/1935.

== Landmarks ==
- Municipal museum and gallery
- Salt Museum, Pomorie
- Ancient Thracian beehive tomb from the Roman period (3rd century AD)
- Traditional 19th-century wooden houses
- Nativity of Theotokos Church (1890)
- Church of the Transfiguration of God (1765)
- St George's Monastery (1856)
- Yavorov's Rocks

== Honour ==
Pomorie Point on Livingston Island in the South Shetland Islands, Antarctica is named after Pomorie.
