= Lake Mandrensko =

- Мандренско езеро (Bulgarian)
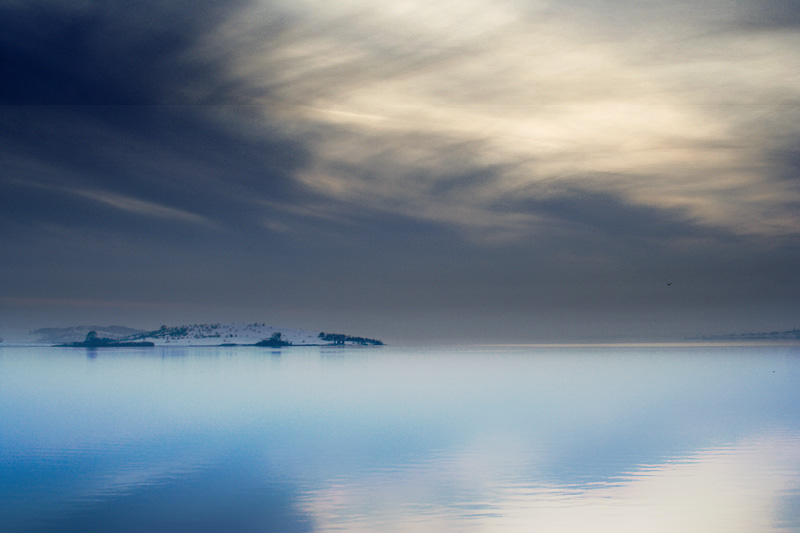
- The water surface and an island

- Location within Bulgaria
- Location: Burgas Province, Bulgaria
- Group: Burgas Lakes
- Coordinates: 42°25′24″N 27°23′29″E
- Type: natural lake, reservoir
- Primary inflows: Izvorska; Fakiyska; Sredetska; Rusokastrenska
- Primary outflows: Black Sea
- Basin countries: Bulgaria
- Built: 1964
- Max. length: 9 km (5.6 mi)
- Max. width: 1.5 km (0.93 mi)
- Surface area: 39.94 km^{2} (15.42 sq mi)

Lake Mandrensko or Lake Mandra (Bulgarian: Мандренско езеро, Mandrensko ezero) is the southernmost of the Burgas Lakes, located in the immediate proximity of the Black Sea and close to Burgas in Bulgaria. Being 9 km long and 1.5 km wide at maximum, as well as having an area of 39.94 km², it was a brackish natural lake until 1963, when it was turned into a reservoir with the construction of a dam to secure fresh water for the large Neftokhim Burgas oil refinery. The rivers Izvorska reka, Fakiyska reka, Sredetska reka and Risokastrenska reka flow into the lake. It houses many freshwater fish as well as sharks that are rare to find in the salt water.

Parts of Lake Mandrensko are designated protected area s, Poda and Uzungeren, inhabited by a number of locally and globally endangered species of fish and birds.

== Name and history ==
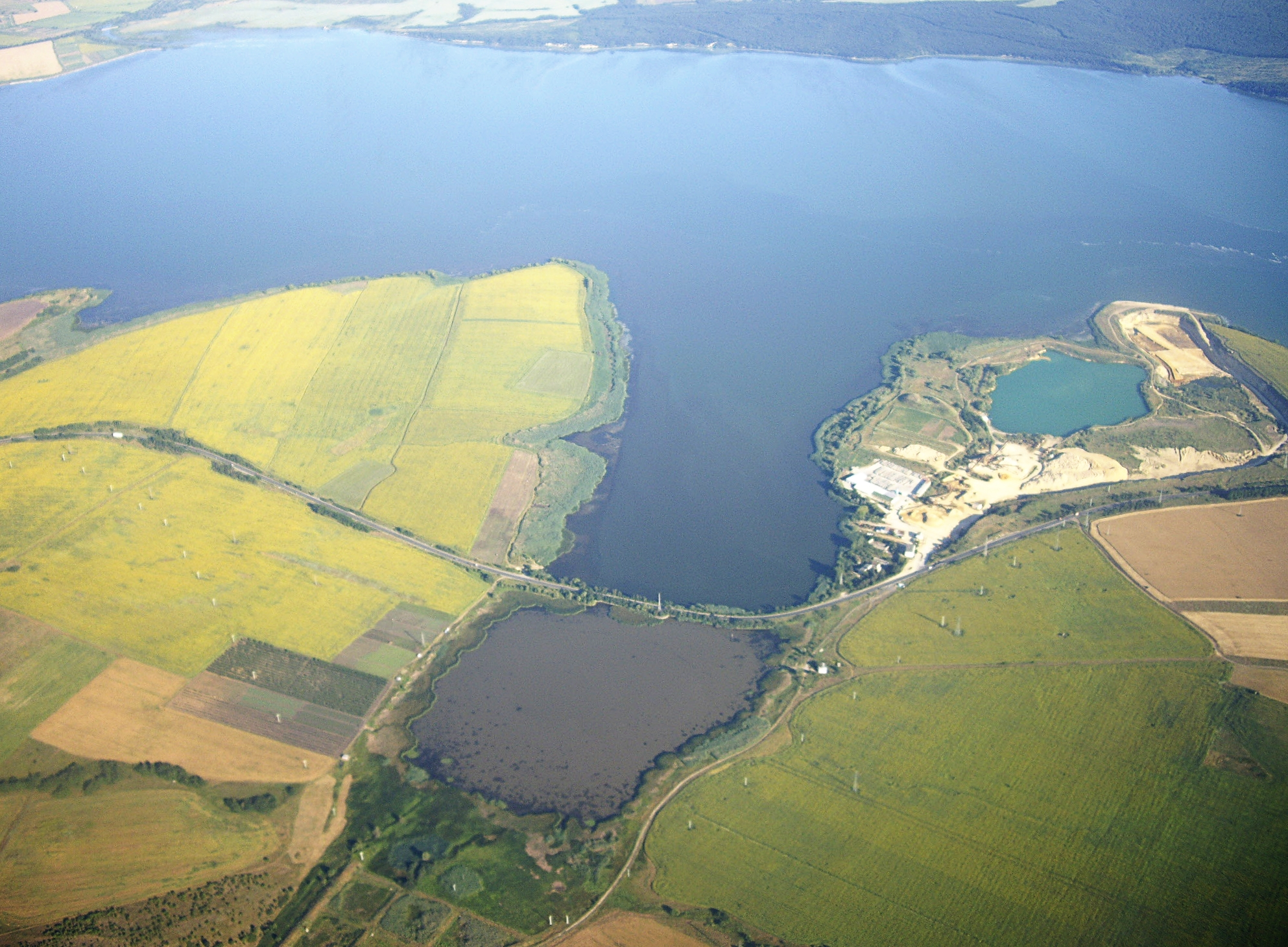
Aerial view of the lake

The ancient city of Develtos was situated on its western shores. Old names of the lake are Körfes, Ahrenslijsko marsh and Yazekliysko lake. The name Körfes comes from the Turkish körfez and means bay. Under this name the lake was found in 1493, which is an important indication that the lake itself was used as a port.

In 1884, Konstantin Jireček described the lake, 10 km long and 1-2 km wide, as an open estuary with low but constant flow. In summer and autumn, and especially in easterly winds, the salinity increased. According to a 1912 report by Prof. Bonchev, it had an area of 16.5 km^{2} and was smaller than Lake Burgas. The report also indicates a depth at the Poda canal of 5 meters, while in the western part it reached only 70-80 cm.

In 1963 a dam wall was built, which turned most of the brackish-water lake into a freshwater dam and increased its area nearly 4 times.

== Geography ==
The lake is the southernmost and largest of the four Burgas lakes with a water surface area of about 1300 hectares. Its length is 8 km, maximum width 1.3 km. It is located in a well-formed river valley, oriented transversely to the sea shore, as the mouth and the dam wall are in close proximity to the southern end of Bourgas. Four rivers flow into the lake: Izvorska, Fakiyska, Sredetska and Rusokastrenska.

The lake was preserved in its natural state until 1934, when corrections were made to some of the rivers and dikes were built in its western part to prevent spring floods. The second major change in the lake occurred in 1963, with the construction of a dam in its eastern part. In this way, part of the shallows overgrown with swamp vegetation were destroyed, the connection of the lake with the sea was cut off and it became completely freshwater. The large reed massifs disappear, and with them the convenient nesting places for herons, pelicans, ducks, etc. species of waterfowl. In this way the only colony of pink pelicans in Bulgaria was destroyed.

== Flora and fauna ==
Some parts of the lake have been declared protected areas (part of the mouth of the estuary-protected area "Poda", with an area of 107 ha, the mouth of the river Izvorska - with an area of 151 ha, "Uzungeren" - with an area of 210 ha. The other lakes of the Mandra coast cover the northernmost slopes of Strandzha, with characteristic forest vegetation - cyclamen, wild peony, snowdrop, crocus and others.

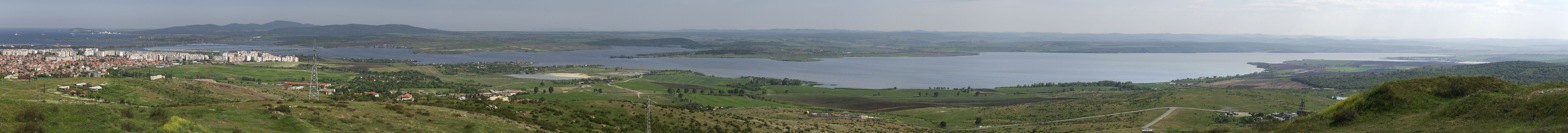
Panoramic view of Lake Mandra and its vicinity

The most interesting are the birds on the lake and the shore, where over 250 species have been found. Among them as globally endangered are the little cormorant, the Dalmatian pelican, the red-breasted goose, the thorny-tailed grebe, the meadow woodpecker. The most important nesting place for birds is "Poda", the coastal meadows, the sandy shores - for the blue, the bee-eater, the red angel and others. The winter concentrations of the brown-headed and hooded diver, the song swan and the little swan are the highest in the country and second in terms of the great white-fronted goose and the red-breasted goose. Due to this fact, Mandra is an ornithologically important place of European importance. Of the mammals in the area, otter and squirrel populations are best preserved. Another value of the lake are its fish stocks and waterfowl. A total of 5 species of fish from the Red Book of Bulgaria have been identified in the lake.
