= Pyrgos =

Pyrgos or Pyrgus (Greek: Πύργος, 'tower') may refer to:

== Places ==
=== Greece ===
- Chalastra, a village in Thessaloniki regional unit
- Myrtos Pyrgos, Minoan archaeological site near Myrtos, Crete
- Priniatikos Pyrgos, an archaeological site near Istron, in eastern Crete
- Pyrgos Dirou, a village in Laconia, municipality of Oitylo, Laconia
- Pyrgos Kallistis, a village in the island of Santorini
- Pyrgos, Tinos, a village in the island of Tinos
- Pyrgos, Boeotia, a village north of Orchomenos in Boeotia, believed by some to be the site of classical Tegyra
- Pyrgos, Corinthia, a mountain village in the municipality of Evrostini, Corinthia
- Pyrgos, Elis, capital city of Elis
- Pyrgos, Heraklion, a village in the municipal unit of Asterousia, Heraklion, Crete
- Pyrgus (Elis), a town of ancient Elis
- Pyrgus (Triphylia), a town of ancient Triphylia, in Elis

=== Elsewhere ===
- Pyrgos, Greek name for the city of Burgas, Bulgaria
- Pyrgos, Cyprus, a town on Morphou Bay
- Pyrgos, Limassol, village near Limassol, Cyprus
- Pyrgos Aphekou, ancient Greek name for Majdal Yaba, Palestine

== Other ==
- Henry Pyrgos (born 1989), Scottish rugby union player
- Leonidas Pyrgos (1871–?), Greek fencer, the first modern Greek Olympic medallist in 1896
- Pyrgos Stadium, a multi-use stadium in Pyrgos, Elis, Greece

== See also ==
- Pyrgo (disambiguation)
- Pyrgus, a butterfly genus
- Burgas (disambiguation)
- Burj (disambiguation)
