= Sher Ali =

Sher Ali may refer to:

- Sher Ali Khan (1825–1879), Amir of Afghanistan
- Sher Ali Bacha (1935–1998), Pashtun revolutionary leader
- Sher Ali Afridi (died 1873), the Pashtun prisoner who killed the British Viceroy of India
- Maulvi Sher Ali (1875–1947), Ahmadi Muslim scholar and Quran translator
- Sher Ali Khan Pataudi (1913–2002), Pakistan Army general
- Sher Ali (sepoy), soldier of the Indian Army decorated for heroism in action in 1945, see Non-U.S. recipients of U.S. gallantry awards
- Sher Ali (cricketer) (born 1970), Pakistani cricketer

== See also ==
- Ali Sher (disambiguation)
- Haider Ali (disambiguation)
