= Pyrgo =

Pyrgo may refer to:

- Pyrgo Park, Havering, London, England
- Pyrgo (foraminifera), a foraminifer genus in the subfamily Quinqueloculininae
- Pyrgo (mythology) (Πυργώ), the first wife of Alcathous, son of Pelops in Greek mythology

== See also ==
- Pirgo, royal residence of King Henry VIII
- Pyrgos (disambiguation)
