= Lake Pomorie =

Lake in Bulgaria

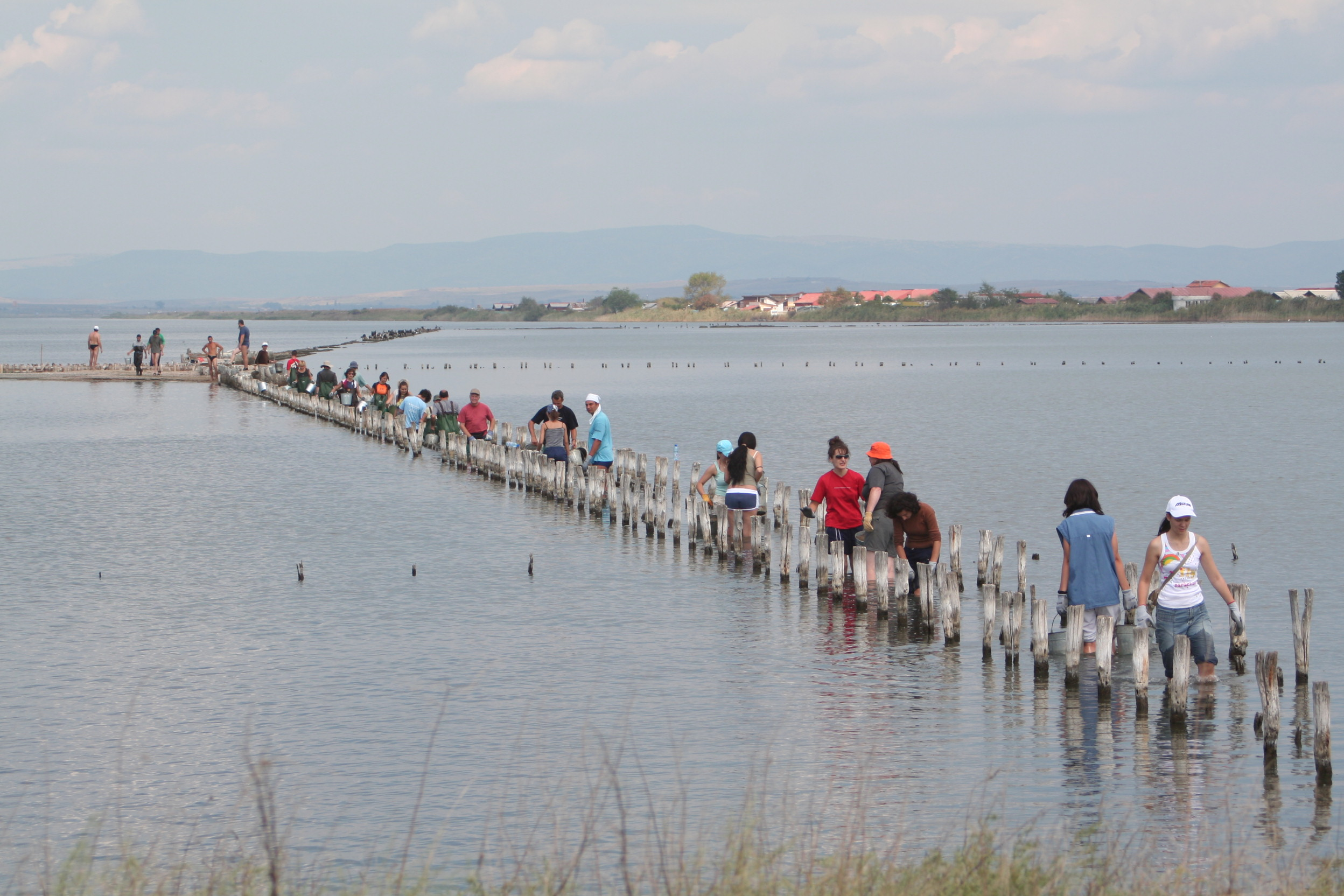
- Bird preservation efforts at Lake Pomorie

- Location within Bulgaria
- Group: Burgas Lakes
- Coordinates: 42.583°N 27.618°E
- Basin countries: Bulgaria
- Surface area: 8.5 km^{2} (3 sq mi)

Ramsar Wetland
- Official name: Pomorie Wetland Complex
- Designated: 24 September 2002
- Reference no.: 1229

Lake Pomorie (Bulgarian: Поморийско езеро, Pomoriysko ezero) is the northernmost of the coastal Burgas Lakes, located in the immediate proximity of the Black Sea and the Bulgarian town of Pomorie. It has an area of 8.5 km^{2} (reaching 10 km^{2} together with the adjacent damp zones) and has an elongated shape with a length of 6.7 km and width of 1.8–2 km. Divided from the sea by a narrow strip of sand (spit) and an artificial dike, the lake is an ultrasaline natural lagoon.

Lake Pomorie is a protected area since January 2001. Sea salt is obtained in the north part and curative mud in the south. Located on the Via Pontica bird migration route, the lake is inhabited by 215 species of birds, 4 of which globally endangered, and is thus of ornithological importance. Since the 2010s, the lake has become a wintering site for thousands of greater flamingoes.
