= Burj al Luq Luq Community Centre and Society =

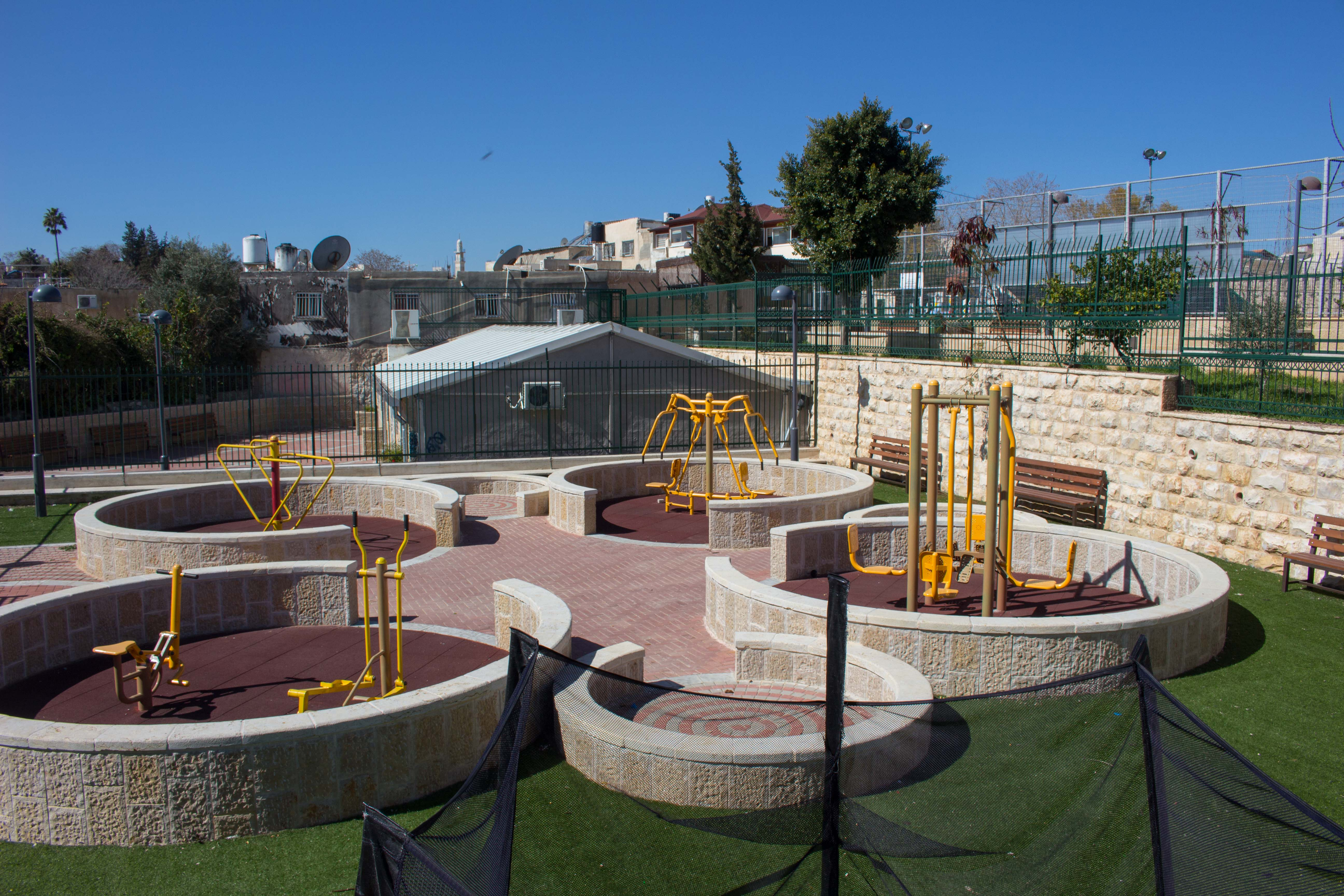
The children's playground at Burj al Luq Luq, in the old city of Jerusalem

The Burj al Luq Luq Community Centre and Society is a community center in East Jerusalem established in 1991. It is named for the Mamluk governor Luqluq. It is registered with the Jerusalem Municipality and the Union of Charitable Organizations in Jerusalem.

== History ==
Burj al Luq Luq was established in 1991 as a community-based social centre, rendering services to the inhabitants of the Old City of Jerusalem. The centre operates programs for women, children and youth. The centre is situated in the Bab Hutta neighbourhood, on a hilltop inside the Muslim Quarter of the Old City where the Northern and Eastern walls of the Old City meet. The centre overlooks the Dome of the Rock.

Burj al Luq Luq is the largest play and sports facility for young people in East Jerusalem. In 2007 the Israeli authorities served demolition orders on six of the centre's buildings.
