= Lake Atanasovsko =

Lake in Bulgaria

Lake Atanasovsko Nature Reserve
- IUCN category IV (habitat/species management area)
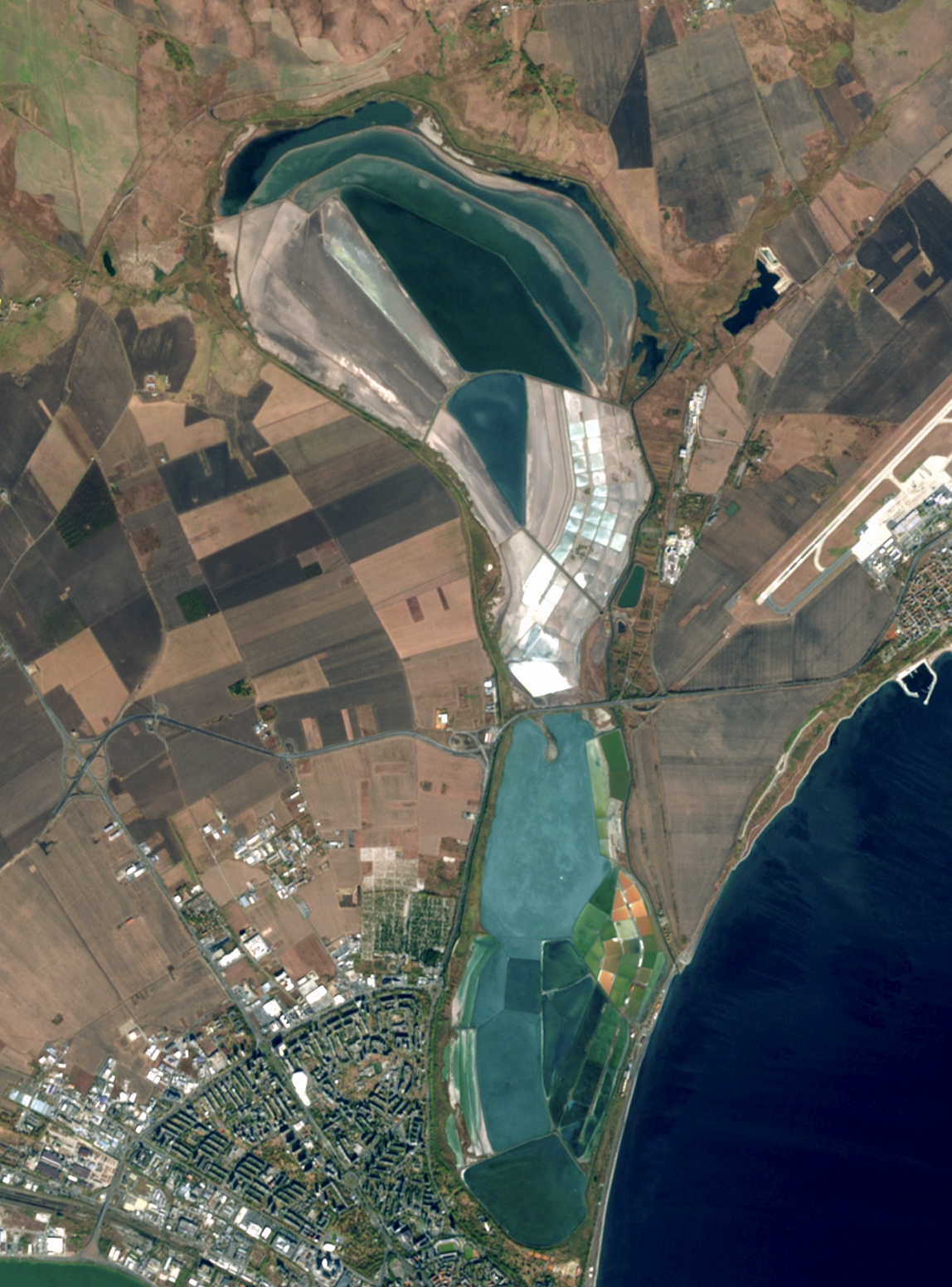
- Sentinel-2 satellite image from November 2022.

- Location within Bulgaria
- Location: close to Burgas and the Black Sea, Burgas Province, Bulgaria
- Nearest city: Burgas
- Coordinates: 42°34′55″N 27°28′12″E
- Established: 1980

Ramsar Wetland
- Official name: Atanasovo Lake
- Designated: 28 November 1984
- Reference no.: 292

Lake Atanasovsko or Lake Atanasovo (Bulgarian: Атанасовско езеро, Atanasovsko ezero [atɐˈnasofsko ˈɛzɛro]) is a salt coastal lake north of Burgas, Bulgaria, located in direct proximity to the Black Sea. The lake is about 5 km long and divided in two by a strip of sand in the middle. The lake is particularly known for the diversity of its flora and fauna and is surrounded by swamps and canals that drain the whole local basin into the sea.

Due to Lake Atanasovsko's high salt content that increases every year because of its link with the sea, salt has been produced in it since 1906, with 40,000 tons of sea salt produced a year. The lake's north part, a nature reserve since 1980, is connected by a canal to the Black Sea, while the smaller south part, which is mostly used for salt production, serves as a buffer zone for the reserve. A road connecting Varna with Burgas passes through the sand strip in the middle of the lake.

== Ecology ==
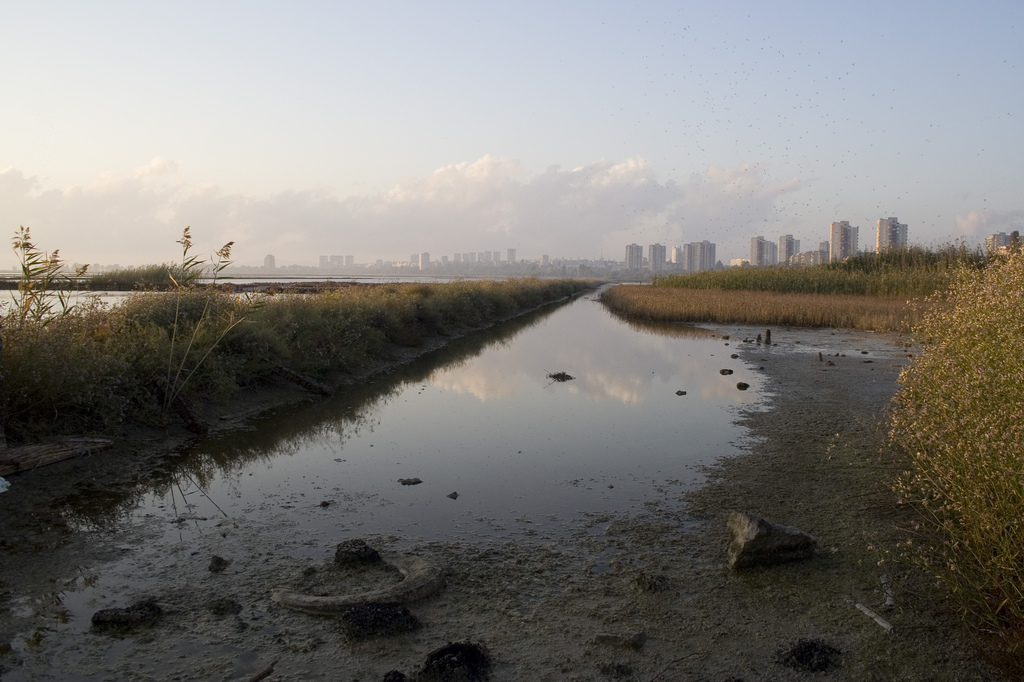
Burgas seen from across the lake

The lake is home to over 230 species of vascular plants, of which 7 are endangered in Bulgaria. It is also inhabited by the Etruscan pygmy shrew, the smallest mammal by mass. Lake Atanasovsko is one of the key ornithological locations in the country, with 314 species of birds being present, 70% of all bird species in Bulgaria. Twelve of them are globally endangered, including the pygmy cormorant, the red-breasted goose, the ferruginous duck, the Dalmatian pelican and the corn crake. Seventeen local species of birds in danger of extinction in Bulgaria also live in the lake, including the common tern and Audouin's gull. The high number of birds is due to the lake's location on the important Via Pontica bird migration route. The bird population is highest during the autumn migration.

As of August, 2019, Lake Atanasovsko is home to the largest colony of flamingos in Bulgaria, numbering 159 individuals, having grown from 126 in autumn, 2018. So far, the birds are not nesting or breeding at the site, but this is expected to occur.
