= Hajji, Iran =

Hajji حاجي
- Village
- Location within Iran
- Coordinates: 31°12′42″N 61°40′47″E
- Country: Iran
- Province: Sistan and Baluchestan
- County: Hirmand
- Bakhsh: Qorqori
- Rural District: Qorqori

Population (2006)
  - Total: 291
- Time zone: UTC+3:30 (IRST)
  - Summer (DST): UTC+4:30 (IRDT)

Hajji (Persian: حاجي, also Romanized as Ḩājjī; also known as Gholām Ḩoseyn Deh Mardeh, Borj-e Yūsef, and Borj-e Yūsof) is a village in Qorqori Rural District, Qorqori District, Hirmand County, Sistan and Baluchestan Province, Iran. At the 2006 census, its population was 291, in 58 families.
