= Borj-e Abbas Khan =

Village in Markazi, Iran

Borj-e Abbas Khan برج عباس خان
- Village
- Location within Iran
- Coordinates: 33°47′37″N 49°07′01″E
- Country: Iran
- Province: Markazi
- County: Shazand
- Bakhsh: Sarband
- Rural District: Malmir

Population (2006)
  - Total: 28
- Time zone: UTC+3:30 (IRST)
  - Summer (DST): UTC+4:30 (IRDT)

Borj-e Abbas Khan (Persian: برج عباس خان, also Romanized as Borj-e Abbās Khān and Borj-e ‘Abbās Khān) is a village in Malmir Rural District, Sarband District, Shazand County, Markazi Province, Iran. According to the 2006 census, its population was 28 people in different families.
