= Borj-e Sofla =

Borj-e Sofla برج سفلي
- Village
- Location within Iran
- Coordinates: 37°16′29″N 46°38′16″E
- Country: Iran
- Province: East Azerbaijan
- County: Hashtrud
- Bakhsh: Nazarkahrizi
- Rural District: Nazarkahrizi

Population (2006)
  - Total: 249
- Time zone: UTC+3:30 (IRST)
  - Summer (DST): UTC+4:30 (IRDT)

Borj-e Sofla (Persian: برج سفلي, also Romanized as Borj-e Soflá) is a village in Nazarkahrizi Rural District, Nazarkahrizi District, Hashtrud County, East Azerbaijan Province, Iran. At the 2006 census, its population was 249, in 48 families.

== Toponomy ==
The name means lower tower or citadel.
