= Burj Attari =

Burj Attari Burj Attari برج اٹاری
- Town
- Location within Pakistan
- Coordinates: 31°34′26″N 74°11′44″E
- Country: Pakistan
- Tehsil: Ferozewala
- District: Sheikhupura District

Government
  - Type: Union Council 32
  - Chairman: Malik Naveed Mehmood Chohan Chairman (PML N)
- Elevation: 200 m (660 ft)
- Time zone: +05 GMT
  - Summer (DST): +04 GMT
- Postal code: 039461
- Area code: 0562

Burj Attari is a town located in the Sheikhupura District of Punjab, Pakistan. Situated 14 km from Lahore and 12 km from Shahdara, it was established in 1200 AD. The town holds historical significance as the spiritual leader of the Sikhs, Baba Guru Nanak, is known to have travelled along the Noorewala road also called locally kachi sarak means old mud road from Burj Attari.

The region is renowned for its agricultural output, with farmers specializing in a wide variety of crops. Among the most popular fruits cultivated are guavas, lychees, and strawberries, which flourish in the area's fertile soil. Additionally, local farmers grow a range of vegetables, including potatoes, cauliflower, brinjal, and pumpkins, along with numerous other crops. The cultivation of essential grains such as rice and wheat further enhances the area's reputation as an agricultural hub.
