= Lablur Rahman =

Bangladeshi cricketer (born 1983)

Muhammad Lablur Rahman
Personal information
- Born: 5 October 1983 (age 43)
- Batting: Right-handed
- Role: Wicket-keeper

Career statistics
Competition	First-class	List A
Matches	5	9
Runs scored	81	64
Batting average	16.20	21.33
100s/50s	0/0	0/0
Top score	49	24
Catches/stumpings	16/2	12/2
- Source: ESPNcricinfo, 23 October 2018

Muhammad Lablur Rahman (born 5 October 1983) is a first-class and List A cricketer from Bangladesh. A right-handed batsman and wicket keeper, he is sometimes known by his nickname Lablu. He made his debut for Dhaka Division in First-class cricket in 2000/01 and also played for them during 2001/02. He reappeared for Barisal Division in 2006/07. His best score with the bat, 49, came against Khulna Division.
