= Bagh Ali Shir =

Bagh Ali Shir باغ عليشير
- Village
- Location within Iran
- Coordinates: 28°52′42″N 57°42′33″E
- Country: Iran
- Province: Kerman
- County: Jiroft
- Bakhsh: Sarduiyeh
- Rural District: Dalfard

Population (2006)
  - Total: 265
- Time zone: UTC+3:30 (IRST)
  - Summer (DST): UTC+4:30 (IRDT)

Bagh Ali Shir (Persian: باغ عليشير, also Romanized as Bāgh ‘Alī Shīr) is a village in Dalfard Rural District, Sarduiyeh District, Jiroft County, Kerman Province, Iran. At the 2006 census, its population was 265, in 48 families.
