= Borj-e Qardash =

Borj-e Qardash برج قارداش
- Village
- Location within Iran
- Coordinates: 37°11′24″N 58°47′26″E
- Country: Iran
- Province: Razavi Khorasan
- County: Quchan
- Bakhsh: Central
- Rural District: Shirin Darreh

Population (2006)
  - Total: 89
- Time zone: UTC+3:30 (IRST)
  - Summer (DST): UTC+4:30 (IRDT)

Borj-e Qardash (Persian: برج قارداش, also Romanized as Borj-e Qārdāsh; also known as Borj) is a village in Shirin Darreh Rural District, in the Central District of Quchan County, Razavi Khorasan Province, Iran. At the 2006 census, its population was 89, in 21 families.
