= Burj Jumeirah =

Building in Dubai, United Arab Emirates

- Arabic: برج جميرا

General information
- Status: Proposed
- Location: Dubai, United Arab Emirates
- Construction started: 2026
- Estimated completion: 2030

Height
- Height: At least 550 m (1,800 ft)

Technical details
- Floor count: 112

Design and construction
- Architect: Skidmore, Owings & Merrill
- Developer: Dubai Holding

Burj Jumeirah (Arabic: برج جميرا) is a proposed Observation tower project near Burj Al Arab in Sufouh district of Dubai. It was initially expected to be completed in 2023. As of January 2022, construction has not begun. All references to the tower have been removed from the developer's website, Dubai Holding.

At the base of the tower and the surrounding area, large spaces will be available to accommodate large numbers of the public and ensure a distinctive interactive atmosphere for visitors. The region will also offer many options for retail outlets including shops, restaurants, and cinemas along the perimeter of the tower.
