= Talambrun Ali Shir =

Talambrun Ali Shir تلمبرون علي شير
- Village
- Country: Iran
- Province: Khuzestan
- County: Andika
- Bakhsh: Central
- Rural District: Shalal and Dasht-e Gol

Population (2006)
  - Total: 27
- Time zone: UTC+3:30 (IRST)
  - Summer (DST): UTC+4:30 (IRDT)

Talambrun Ali Shir (Persian: تلمبرون علي شير, also Romanized as Tlambrūn ʿAlī Shīr) is a village in Shalal and Dasht-e Gol Rural District, in the Central District of Andika County, Khuzestan Province, Iran. At the 2006 census, its population was 27, in 4 families.
