= Safar Beyk =

Safar Beyk صفربیک
- Village
- Location within Iran
- Coordinates: 29°51′13″N 51°10′52″E
- Country: Iran
- Province: Fars
- County: Mamasani
- Bakhsh: Mahvarmilani
- Rural District: Mishan

Population (2006)
  - Total: 91
- Time zone: UTC+3:30 (IRST)
  - Summer (DST): UTC+4:30 (IRDT)

Safar Beyk (Persian: صفربیک, also Romanized as Şafar Beyk; also known as Borj-e Safar Beg, Burj-i-Safar Beg, Qal‘eh-ye Şafar Beyg, Şafā Beyg, Şafar Beīk, and Şafar Beyg) is a village in Mishan Rural District, Mahvarmilani District, Mamasani County, Fars province, Iran. At the 2006 census, its population was 91, in 18 families.
