= Borj-e Olya =

Borj-e Olya برج عليا
- Village
- Location within Iran
- Coordinates: 37°17′21″N 46°38′47″E
- Country: Iran
- Province: East Azerbaijan
- County: Hashtrud
- Bakhsh: Nazarkahrizi
- Rural District: Nazarkahrizi

Population (2006)
  - Total: 94
- Time zone: UTC+3:30 (IRST)
  - Summer (DST): UTC+4:30 (IRDT)

Borj-e Olya (Persian: برج عليا, also Romanized as Borj-e ‘Olyā; also known as Borj Bālā and Borj-e Bālā) is a village in Nazarkahrizi Rural District, Nazarkahrizi District, Hashtrud County, East Azerbaijan Province, Iran. At the 2006 census, its population was 94, in 15 families.
