= Borj, Akkar =

Borj البرج
- Municipality
- Location within Lebanon
- Coordinates: 34.530833°N 36.189167°E
- Country: Lebanon
- Governorate: Akkar Governorate
- District: Akkar District

Area
  - Total: 0.241 km^{2} (0.093 sq mi)

Population (2009)
  - Total: 1,320 voters
  - Density: 5,480/km^{2} (14,200/sq mi)
- Time zone: UTC+2 (EET)
  - Summer (DST): UTC+3 (EEST)
- Dialing code: +961

Borj (Arabic: البرج, romanized: al-Burj) is a municipality in the Akkar District of Lebanon. The town has a Köppen climate classification of Csa. There are nine Municipal Council members and one makhatir.
