= Alisher Saipov =

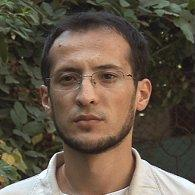
- Born: Alisher Saipov; 4 September 1981; Kyrgyz SSR
- Died: 24 October 2007 (aged 26); Osh, Kyrgyzstan
- Occupation: Journalist
- Known for: 2007 murder

Alisher Saipov (Uzbek: Alisher Soipov, Алишер Соипов; 4 September 1981 – 24 October 2007) was a Kyrgyzstani journalist of Uzbek ethnic origin and editor-in-chief of the newspaper Siyosat of the country's ethnic Uzbek minority, which reported on human rights abuses in neighboring Uzbekistan. Saipov often wrote articles critical of Uzbek President Islam Karimov and his government. He wrote extensively about torture in Uzbek prisons, the clampdown on dissent, and the rise of Islamic radicalism. He also worked as a correspondent for RFE/RL and Voice of America. He was shot dead at close range outside his downtown office in Osh in October 2007.

== Journalism ==
Saipov reported "aggressively" on Uzbekistan's politics. According to the NGO Committee to Protect Journalists (CPJ), Saipov was the subject of attacks in state-controlled Uzbek media in the month before his death, and had stated that Uzbek security agents were following him.

Natalia Antelava from BBC News reported: "At twenty-six, Alisher Saipov was one of the most outspoken journalists in Central Asia ... He wrote extensively about torture in Uzbek President Islam Karimov's prisons, about the clampdown on dissent and the plight of the Uzbek refugees living in Kyrgyzstan."

== Assassination and investigation ==
On 24 October 2007, Saipov was shot dead by someone at close range outside of his office in Osh. He was survived by his wife and three-month-old daughter. Amnesty International called on Kyrgyz authorities to better protect journalists, and for an investigation into Saipov's murder that was "thorough, impartial and in line with international practices".

In 2007 and 2008, Kyrgyz investigators said they were probing allegations that Uzbek security agents might have been involved in the murder. The International Crisis Group, an NGO, stated that there were "strong indications" that Uzbek agents were responsible.

In April 2009, officials announced that they had arrested former police officer Abdufarit Rasulov for the murder and found the murder weapon. However, the trial judge in the Osh City Court ruled that there was insufficient evidence for a trial. Prosecutors appealed, and the judge was replaced. On December 9, 2009 Kyrgyzstan’s Supreme Court ruled that the prosecution of the suspect Abdufarit Rasulov, a former policeman, could proceed, following an appeal by Alisher Saipov's father Avaz Saipov, who called the case "bogus". According to Uznews, Rasulov denied involvement in the murder and said that he was beaten by police. A CPJ spokesperson stated that "the refusal to launch a new investigation into the murder of Alisher Saipov only adds to the impression that the Kyrgyz authorities are concerned less with justice than in closing a diplomatically embarrassing case." Radio Free Europe was critical of the decision, stating, "The confusion and contradictions around the investigation have granted de facto impunity to Saipov's killers and raise questions about the Kyrgyz government's commitment to solving the case". In 2010, Rasulov was found guilty and sentenced to twenty years' imprisonment.

On 25 October 2012, Kyrgyz Deputy Interior Minister Melis Turganbaev stated that a new investigation into the murder had begun.
