= Haider Ali Kohari =

17th century Indian general

Maulana Haider Ali Kohari (born 17th century) was a military general and secretary of the Maratha king, Shivaji I. He was one of the most trusted lieutenants of Shivaji and was involved in almost all of his early campaigns. Haider Ali Kohari was probably the highest Muslim general in the Maratha army. Born in a Marathi-speaking Muslim family in the Deccan, he quickly took to arms and weaponry. Although he was a warrior, he was also a learned Islamic scholar. Information about his later years is obscure.
