= Alisher Mirzo =

Uzbek painter (born 1948)

Alisher Mirzo (born March 21, 1948, in Tashkent, Soviet Union) is an Uzbek painter whose works are kept in galleries, museums and private collections in Germany, France, Italy, Spain, Norway, Luxembourg, Bulgaria, Yugoslavia, Russia, Japan, India, Madagascar and the United States of America. He combines elements of Impressionism and Abstract Art with traditional Uzbek art forms such as miniature painting and decorative styles of applied art. His subjects range from landscapes and still lives to intimate scenes of ethnic Uzbek life.

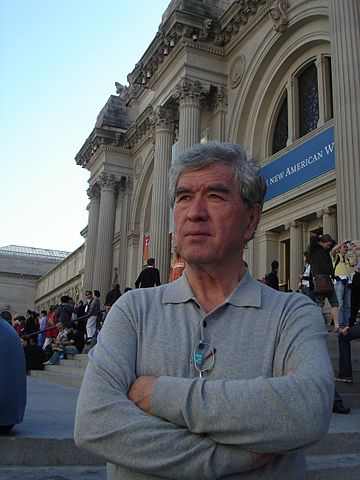
Alisher Mirzo in front of the Metropolitan Museum of Art in New York, 2011

== Education and professional accomplishments ==
Mirzo studied at the Republican College of Arts named after P.P. Benkov; and at the Moscow State Art Institute named after V.N. Surikov (now Moscow School of Painting, Sculpture and Architecture).

In 1974, he was hired as a teacher in the architecture department of the Tashkent State Polytechnics Institute named after Beruniy (now Tashkent State Technical University). In 1978 he lectured at the theater artist's Institute named after A.N. Ostrovskiy. In 1997, he was accepted as a member of the Academy of Art in Uzbekistan. The same year he was promoted to professor of the National Institute of Arts and Design named after K. Bekhzod, a position he still holds today.

== Personal exhibitions and participations in exhibitions ==
- 1976, participated in "Youth of the Country" in Moscow
- 1977, participated in "Youth of the Country" in Hungary, Bulgaria, Romania and Czechoslovakia
- 1979, personal exhibition in Moscow
- 1980, participated in "Tashkent - 80" in Tashkent (Uzbek SSR, Soviet Union)
- 1984, participated in "Art of Uzbekistan" and "Earth and People" in Moscow
- 1987, personal exhibition in Ulan Bator (Mongolia)
- 1988, personal exhibition in Damask (Syria)
- 1988, personal exhibition in the Birma Academy and Institute of Cultural Mission of Rama Khrishna in Calcutta (India)
- 1993, personal exhibition in Tashkent (Uzbekistan)
- 1995, personal exhibition in Tashkent (Uzbekistan)
- 2008, participated in the Beijing International Art Biennale (China)
- 2008, personal exhibition "I am a Son of the Old City" in Tashkent (Uzbekistan)
- 2009, personal exhibition "Song of Tashkent" in the Central House of Artists, Tashent (Uzbekistan)
- 2009, personal exhibition in Kaunas (Latvia)
- 2010 (June 10), personal exhibition in Ana Tzarev Gallery, New York City (USA).

== Awards and honors ==
Mirzo received many awards and honors throughout his career. He received a diploma of the Academy of Arts of USSR in 1986. He was awarded an honor named after A. Kadiriy in 1994. Mirzo was awarded the title of Honorary Academician of the Russian Art Academy in 2011.

== Retrospectives and published monographs on the work of Alisher Mirzo ==
- A. Umarov, Alisher Mirzaev, Tashkent (Uzbekistan), 1993.
- A. Umarov, Retrospective of Alisher Mirzo, Istanbul (Turkey), 1998.
- A. Egamberdiev, Life and Art of Alisher Mirzo, Tashkent (Uzbekistan), 1999.
- A. Mirzo, Alisher Mirzo. I am a son of the Old City, Tashkent (Uzbekistan), 2008.
