= Burj Kaila =

Coordinates: 31°01′N 75°41′E

- Village
- Location in Punjab, India Burj Kaila (India)
- Country: India
- State: Punjab
- District: Jalandhar
- Tehsil: Phillaur

Government
  - Type: Panchayat raj
  - Body: Gram panchayat

Area
  - Total: 116 ha (290 acres)

Population (2011)
  - Total: 348; 186/162 ♂/♀
  - Scheduled Castes: 36; 18/18 ♂/♀
  - Total Households: 77

Languages
  - Official: Punjabi
- Time zone: UTC+5:30 (IST)
- Telephone: 01826
- ISO 3166 code: IN-PB
- Vehicle registration: PB-37
- Website: jalandhar.gov.in

Burj Kaila is a village in Phillaur in Jalandhar district of Punjab State, India. It is located 10 kilometres (6.2 mi) from sub district headquarter and 43 kilometres (27 mi) from district headquarter. The village is administrated by Sarpanch an elected representative of the village.

== Demography ==
As of 2011, the village has a total number of 77 houses and a population of 348 of which 186 are males while 162 are females. According to the report published by Census India in 2011, out of the total population of the village 36 people are from Schedule Caste and the village does not have any Schedule Tribe population so far.

== See also ==
- List of villages in India
