= Borj-e Mirgol =

Borj-e Mirgol برج ميرگل
- Village
- Location within Iran
- Coordinates: 31°13′25″N 61°43′19″E
- Country: Iran
- Province: Sistan and Baluchestan
- County: Hirmand
- Bakhsh: Qorqori
- Rural District: Qorqori

Population (2006)
  - Total: 278
- Time zone: UTC+3:30 (IRST)
  - Summer (DST): UTC+4:30 (IRDT)

Borj-e Mirgol (Persian: برج ميرگل, also Romanized as Borj-e Mīrgol; also known as Borj-e Mīr Ghūl) is a village in Qorqori Rural District, Qorqori District, Hirmand County, Sistan and Baluchestan Province, Iran. At the 2006 census, its population was 278, in 55 families.
