= Borj-e Bahmani =

Borj-e Bahmani برج بهمني
- Village
- Location within Iran
- Coordinates: 30°43′53″N 50°32′35″E
- Country: Iran
- Province: Kohgiluyeh and Boyer-Ahmad
- County: Kohgiluyeh
- Bakhsh: Central
- Rural District: Dehdasht-e Gharbi

Population (2006)
  - Total: 116
- Time zone: UTC+3:30 (IRST)
  - Summer (DST): UTC+4:30 (IRDT)

Borj-e Bahmani (Persian: برج بهمني, also Romanized as Borj-e Bahmanī) is a village in Dehdasht-e Gharbi Rural District, in the Central District of Kohgiluyeh County, Kohgiluyeh and Boyer-Ahmad Province, Iran. As of the 2006 census, the population was 116, in 18 families.
