= Borj-e Seyfollah =

Borj-e Seyfollah برج سيف اله
- Village
- Location within Iran
- Coordinates: 29°26′07″N 54°23′09″E
- Country: Iran
- Province: Fars
- County: Neyriz
- Bakhsh: Poshtkuh
- Rural District: Meshkan

Population (2006)
  - Total: 10
- Time zone: UTC+3:30 (IRST)
  - Summer (DST): UTC+4:30 (IRDT)

Borj-e Seyfollah (Persian: برج سيف اله, also Romanized as Borj-e Seyfollāh) is a village in Meshkan Rural District, Poshtkuh District, Neyriz County, Fars province, Iran. At the 2006 census, its population was 10, in 4 families.
