= Burj Mandi =

Village in Punjab, Pakistan

Coordinates: 31°39′25″N 73°06′0″E

Burj Mandi is an extra abadi of village "BURJ" in Chak Jhumra town in Faisalabad district in Pakistan's Punjab province. The village has a railway station on the Faisalabad Sargodha Railway.

It is part of the Punjab Assembly constituency PP-51.

== Infrastructure ==
Burj village has a basic health unit, girls high school, boys elementary school, post office, UBL branch, telephone service, running water, a historical graveyard and electricity and sui gass. A market can be found on the high street where mostly residents do their shopping. People from the vicinity also use the market. Mosques are plentiful. This part of Faisalabad is irrigated by the Jhang Branch canal. It is 30 km away from Faisalabad city and 8 km from Chak Jhumra and 3 km from main Jhumra, Chiniot road.
