= Borj-e Khankaram =

Borj-e Khankaram برج خان كرم
- Village
- Location within Iran
- Coordinates: 28°36′41″N 53°25′12″E
- Country: Iran
- Province: Fars
- County: Jahrom
- Bakhsh: Kordian
- Rural District: Qotbabad

Population (2006)
  - Total: 67
- Time zone: UTC+3:30 (IRST)
  - Summer (DST): UTC+4:30 (IRDT)

Borj-e Khankaram (Persian: برج خان كرم, also Romanized as Borj-e Khānkaram) is a village in Qotbabad Rural District, Kordian District, Jahrom County, Fars province, Iran. At the 2006 census, its population was 67, in 14 families.
