= Borj-e Ziad =

Borj-e Ziad برج زياد
- Village
- Location within Iran
- Coordinates: 33°05′19″N 59°21′58″E
- Country: Iran
- Province: South Khorasan
- County: Birjand
- Bakhsh: Central
- Rural District: Alqurat

Population (2006)
  - Total: 119
- Time zone: UTC+3:30 (IRST)
  - Summer (DST): UTC+4:30 (IRDT)

Borj-e Ziad (Persian: برج زياد, also Romanized as Borj-e Zīād, Borj-e Zeyād, Borj Zīād, and Burj-i-Ziād) is a village in Alqurat Rural District, in the Central District of Birjand County, South Khorasan Province, Iran. At the 2006 census, its population was 119, in 36 families.
