= Bagh-e Alishir =

Bagh-e Alishir باغ علي شير
- Village
- Location within Iran
- Coordinates: 29°14′37″N 57°18′36″E
- Country: Iran
- Province: Kerman
- County: Jiroft
- Bakhsh: Sarduiyeh
- Rural District: Sarduiyeh

Population (2006)
  - Total: 418
- Time zone: UTC+3:30 (IRST)
  - Summer (DST): UTC+4:30 (IRDT)

Bagh-e Alishir (Persian: باغ علي شير, also Romanized as Bāgh-e ‘Alīshīr and Bāgh Alishir; also known as Baghal Shīr and Bāgh-i-‘Ali) is a village in Sarduiyeh Rural District, Sarduiyeh District, Jiroft County, Kerman Province, Iran. At the 2006 census, its population was 418, in 96 families.
