= Burj al-Taqa =

Skyscraper in Dubai, UAE

The Burj al-Taqa, also known as the Dubai Energy Tower, is a skyscraper that was to be built in Dubai in the United Arab Emirates. Like the World Trade Center (Manama), it was to incorporate power generation assets into its structure, including a 200 ft (61 m) wind turbine on the roof and solar panels.

The project was not publicly cancelled after the 2008 financial crisis, but it has been quietly mothballed. No ground has been broken on the structure site and there are no plans to begin construction as of January 2012. Though it may not be completed, there is always Burj Al Khalifa and The seven-star hotel Burj Al Arab to visit.

== See also ==
- World Trade Center (Manama)
