= Haider Ali =

Haider Ali, or similar spellings, may refer to:

== Sports ==
- Haider Ali (artist), Pakistani painter
- Haider Ali (athlete) (born 1984), all-round Pakistani Paralympic athlete
- Haider Ali (boxer) (born 1979), Pakistani Olympic boxer
- Haider Ali (cricketer, born 2000), Pakistani cricketer
- Haider Ali (Emirati cricketer) (born 1994), Pakistani-born United Arab Emirates cricketer
- Haider Ali (cricketer, born 1997), Pakistani cricketer
- Haider Alo Ali (born 1979), Emirati footballer
- Hyder Ali (Indian cricketer) (1943–2022), Indian cricketer

== Others ==
- Haidar Ali (actor), (born 1948) Indian actor
- Haider Ali Kohari, (c. 1710–1770), military general in India
- Hyder Ali (c. 1722–1782), de facto ruler of the Kingdom of Mysore in southern India

== See also ==
- Ali Haidar (disambiguation)
