= Burgas Lakes =

Group of coastal lakes around Burgas, Bulgaria

Coordinates: 42°28′12″N 27°25′48″E

The Burgas Lakes (Bulgarian: Бургаски езера, Burgaski ezera) or Burgas Wetlands (Бургаски влажни зони, Burgaski vlazhni zoni) are a group of coastal lakes of varying saltiness located around the Bulgarian city of Burgas in the proximity of the Black Sea. They constitute the largest group of lakes in the country and comprise some of Bulgaria's biggest and most important lakes.

The lakes' total area (including swamps, marshes, ponds and other reservoirs) amounts to 95 km^{2}, of which 33.30 km^{2} are either proclaimed or proposed protected areas that are inhabited by a large number of locally or globally endangered species of birds, fish and mammals. Apart from this, the Burgas Lakes are also of economic importance, used to obtain sea salt and curative mud, as well as to supply the local economy with fresh water, in the case of Lake Mandrensko.

The lakes comprise (in north to south order):

- Lake Pomorie, an ultrasaline lagoon
- Lake Atanasovsko, a nature reserve and Ramsar site
- Lake Burgas or Lake Vaya, the largest natural lake in the country by area
- Lake Poda, sometimes regarded as a part of Lake Mandrensko
- Lake Mandrensko, now a fresh water reservoir, the largest of the group

== Image gallery ==
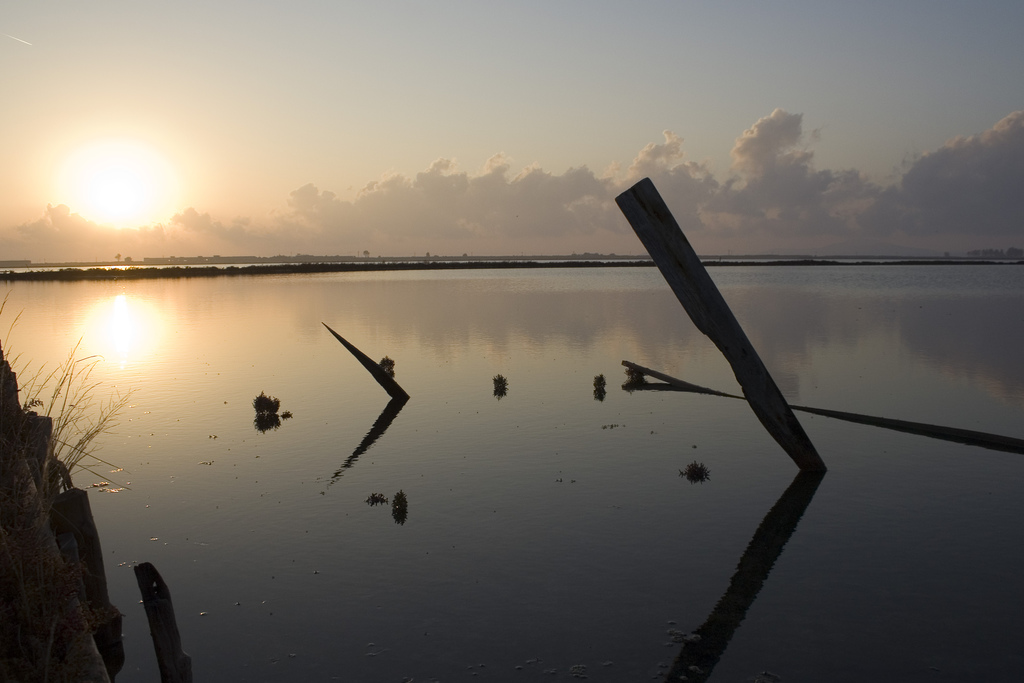
Lake Atanasovsko

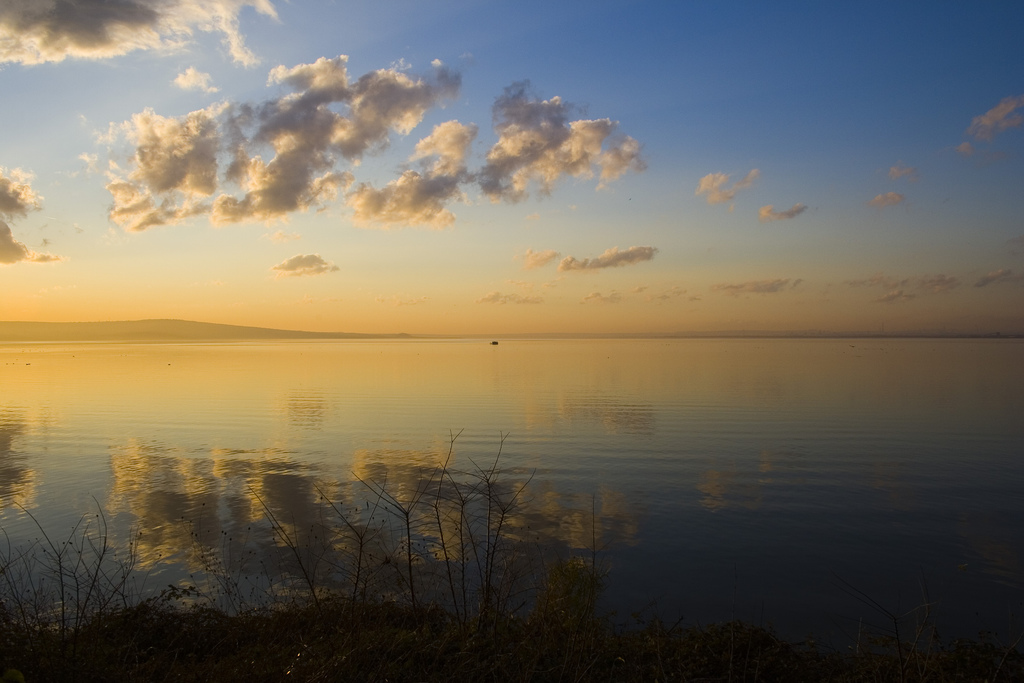
Lake Burgas

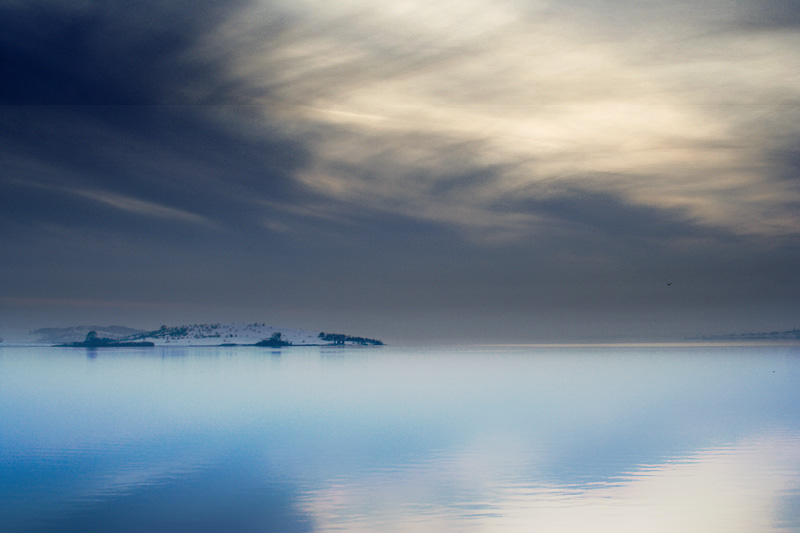
Lake Mandrensko
