= Dasht-e Dera Balverdi =

Dasht-e Dera Balverdi دشت درابلوردي
- Village
- Location within Iran
- Coordinates: 29°49′36″N 51°20′58″E
- Country: Iran
- Province: Fars
- County: Mamasani
- Bakhsh: Mahvarmilani
- Rural District: Mishan

Population (2006)
  - Total: 59
- Time zone: UTC+3:30 (IRST)
  - Summer (DST): UTC+4:30 (IRDT)

Dasht-e Dera Balverdi (Persian: دشت درابلوردي, also Romanized as Dasht-e Derā Balverdī; also known as Borj-e Dasht Darreh, Burj Dasht-i-Dera, Dasht Darā, and Dasht-e Derā) is a village in Mishan Rural District, Mahvarmilani District, Mamasani County, Fars province, Iran. At the 2006 census, its population was 59, in 16 families.
