= Borj-e Ali Shir =

Borj-e Ali Shir برج علي شير
- Village
- Location within Iran
- Coordinates: 30°44′45″N 50°35′56″E
- Country: Iran
- Province: Kohgiluyeh and Boyer-Ahmad
- County: Kohgiluyeh
- Bakhsh: Central
- Rural District: Dehdasht-e Gharbi

Population (2006)
  - Total: 405
- Time zone: UTC+3:30 (IRST)
  - Summer (DST): UTC+4:30 (IRDT)

Borj-e Ali Shir (Persian: برج علي شير, also Romanized as Borj-e ‘Alī Shīr; also known as Borj-e ‘Alī Shīr-e Soflá) is a village in Dehdasht-e Gharbi Rural District, in the Central District of Kohgiluyeh County, Kohgiluyeh and Boyer-Ahmad Province, Iran. At the 2006 census, its population was 405, in 73 families.
