= BNS Ali Haider =

Two ships of Bangladesh Navy carried the name BNS Ali Haider:

- BNS Ali Haider (1978), a Leopard-class frigate transferred from Royal Navy.
- BNS Ali Haider (2014), a Type 053H2 (Jianghu-III) frigate transferred from People's Liberation Army Navy.
