= Borj-e Mohammadan =

Borj-e Mohammadan برج محمدان
- Village
- Location within Iran
- Coordinates: 33°35′34″N 59°28′34″E
- Country: Iran
- Province: South Khorasan
- County: Zirkuh
- Bakhsh: Zohan
- Rural District: Afin

Population (2006)
  - Total: 213
- Time zone: UTC+3:30 (IRST)
  - Summer (DST): UTC+4:30 (IRDT)

Borj-e Mohammadan (Persian: برج محمدان, also Romanized as Borj-e Moḩammadān; also known as Borj-e Moḩammad, Borj, Borj Mohammad, and Burj) is a village in Afin Rural District, Zohan District, Zirkuh County, South Khorasan Province, Iran. At the 2006 census, its population was 213, in 59 families.
