= Borj, Esfarayen =

Village in North Khorasan province, Iran

Borj Persian: برج
- Village
- Location within Iran
- Coordinates: 37°05′55″N 57°27′10″E
- Country: Iran
- Province: North Khorasan
- County: Esfarayen
- District: Central
- Rural District: Ruin

Population (2016)
  - Total: 1,010
- Time zone: UTC+3:30 (IRST)

Borj (Persian: برج) is a village in Ruin Rural District of the Central District in Esfarayen County, North Khorasan province, Iran.

== Demographics ==
=== Population ===
At the time of the 2006 National Census, the village's population was 595 in 161 households. The following census in 2011 counted 594 people in 176 households. The 2016 census measured the population of the village as 1,010 people in 302 households.
