= Borj-e Zavalfaqar =

Borj-e Zavalfaqar برج ذوالفقار
- Village
- Location within Iran
- Coordinates: 37°36′02″N 57°59′41″E
- Country: Iran
- Province: North Khorasan
- County: Shirvan
- Bakhsh: Sarhad
- Rural District: Takmaran

Population (2006)
  - Total: 49
- Time zone: UTC+3:30 (IRST)
  - Summer (DST): UTC+4:30 (IRDT)

Borj-e Zavalfaqar (Persian: برج ذوالفقار, also Romanized as Borj-e Zavālfaqār; also known as Borj) is a village in Takmaran Rural District, Sarhad District, Shirvan County, North Khorasan Province, Iran. At the 2006 census, its population was 49, in 9 families.
