= Borj-e Aqa =

Village in North Khorasan province, Iran

Borj-e Aqa Persian: برج اقا
- Village
- Location within Iran
- Country: Iran
- Province: North Khorasan
- County: Jajrom
- District: Central
- Rural District: Miyan Dasht

Population (2016)
  - Total: 19
- Time zone: UTC+3:30 (IRST)

Borj-e Aqa (Persian: برج اقا) (Note: Also romanized as Borj-e Āqā) is a village in Miyan Dasht Rural District of the Central District in Jajrom County, North Khorasan province, Iran.

== Demographics ==
=== Population ===
At the time of the 2006 National Census, the village's population was 26 in seven households. The following census in 2011 counted 23 people in six households. The 2016 census measured the population of the village as 19 people in six households.
