= Via Pontica =

Ancient Roman road from Byzantium (Istanbul) to the Danube Delta

Via Pontica was an ancient Roman road in Thrace along the Black Sea, starting from Byzantium and passing through Deultum (today Debelt), Aquae Calidae (today an outlying neighborhood of Burgas), Apollonia, Mesembria, Odessos, Byzone, and Kaliakra (today in Bulgaria); and then through Kallatis, Tomis, and Istros (today in Romania).

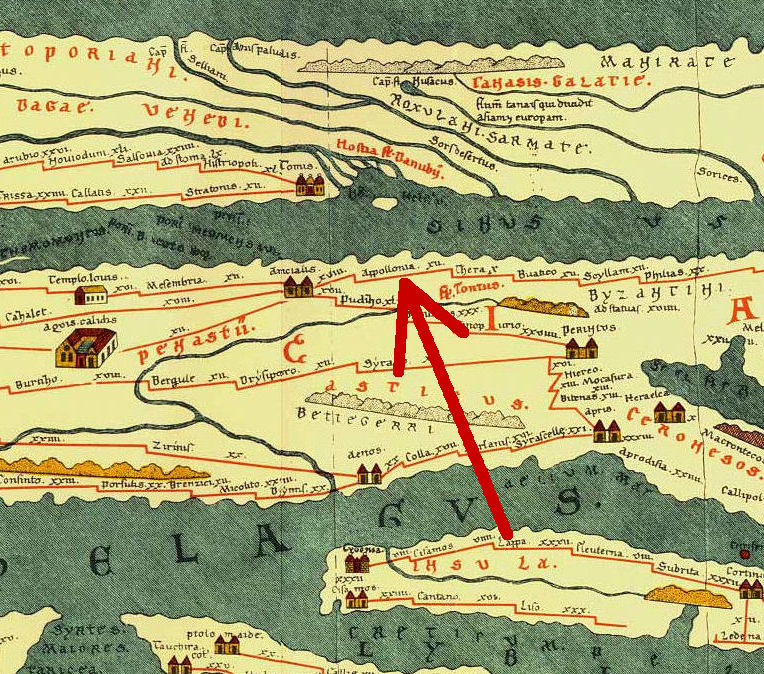
Appollonia Sozopol TabulaPeutingeriana

== Bird migration route ==
Today the name "Via Pontica" is given to Europe's second largest bird migration route, through the western part of the Black Sea Biogeographic Region. The migrating birds use the coastal lakes, marshes and lagoons behind the shoreline, and some spend the winter in these wetlands. The Danube Delta is the best known of the wetlands. For the first time in ornithology the term "Via Pontica" was used by the Bulgarian ornithologist Nikolay Boev (1922-1985) to denote the Western Black Sea migratory way of birds.

== Archeology Project in Bulgaria ==
In 2010 Bozhidar Dimitrov, director of the National Historical Museum, and Simeon Dyankov, Deputy Prime Minister, started the Via Pontica project of restoring twenty ancient fortifications along the Black Sea coast. These start from the southernmost point of Rezovo and span the whole Bulgarian coastline to Kaliakra. As a result of this work, several new archeological sites have been uncovered, including the Akra fortification near Apollonia, Thrace, now Sozopol.
