= Sredets, Burgas Province =

Sredets Средец
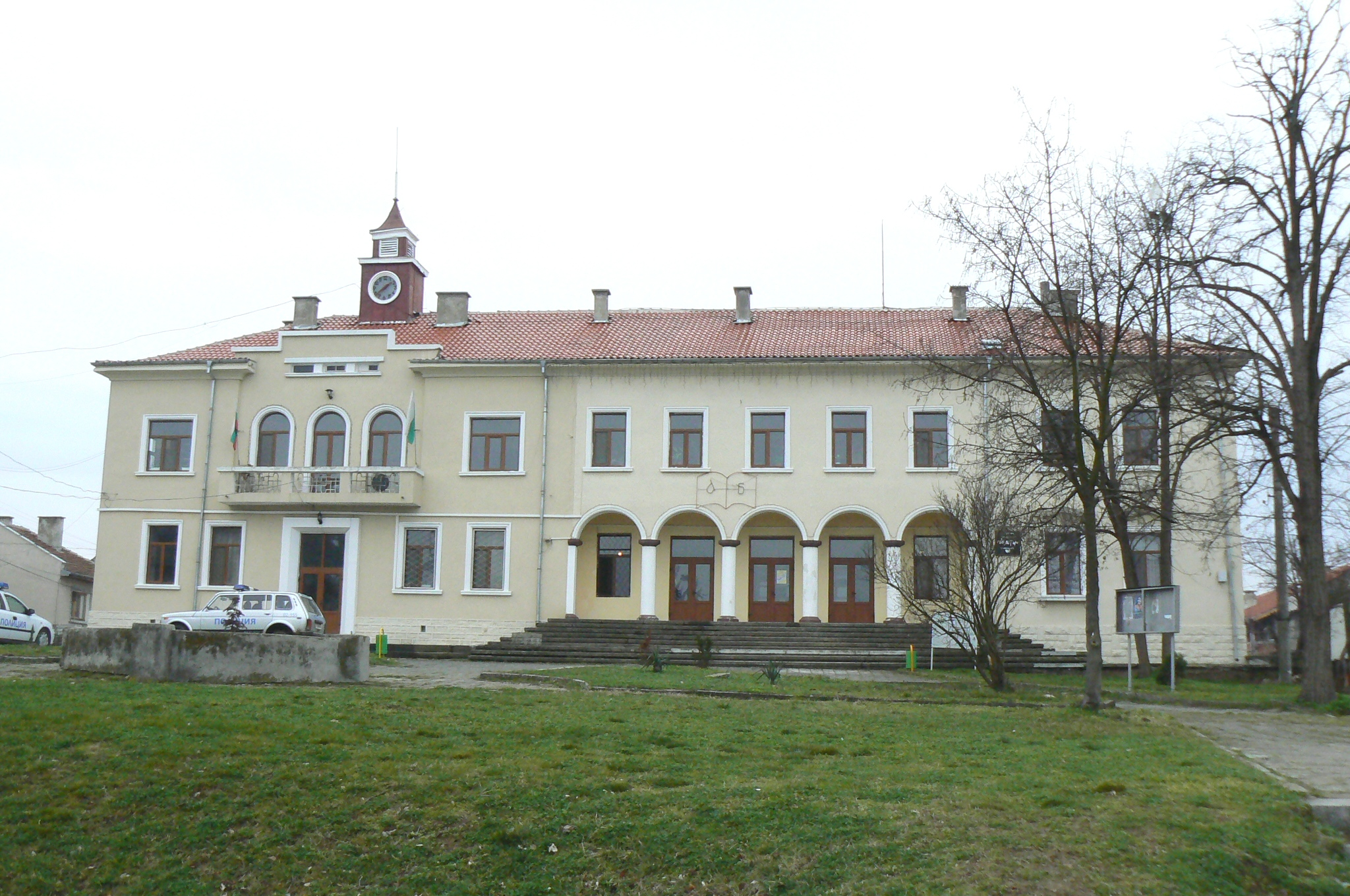
- The Probuda cultural centre (chitalishte)

- Location of Sredets
- Coordinates: 42°21′N 27°12′E
- Country: Bulgaria
- Province: Burgas
- Municipality: Sredets

Government
  - Mayor: Ivan Zhabov (GERB)
- Elevation: 47 m (154 ft)

Population (2013)
  - Total: 8,872
- Time zone: UTC+2 (EET)
  - Summer (DST): UTC+3 (EEST)
- Postal Code: 8300
- Area code: 05551

Sredets (Bulgarian: Средец [srɛˈdɛt͡s]) is a town in Burgas Province in southeastern Bulgaria. It is located near Lake Mandrensko and the northern slopes of Strandzha. Sredets is the administrative centre of Sredets Municipality.

Sredets Point on Smith Island, Antarctica is named after the town.

== History ==
The Roman fortress of Kaleto, located 2 km southwest of Sredets, was constructed at the end of the fifth and beginning of sixth century AD. Under the First Bulgarian Empire, the fortress became known as Potamukastel (Bulgarian: Потамукастел). Potamukastel was destroyed in the 11th century, but later rebuilt in the 12th century AD. The fortress was abandoned during Ottoman rule of Bulgaria, and the population of Potamukastel resettled at the location of the modern town and founded the village of Karabunar (Bulgarian: Карабунар) ("black well" in Turkish).

Karabunar is first mentioned in 1595, and is later found in Ottoman tax registers from 1676–1731. King Charles XII of Sweden is known to have stayed overnight in the village in 1713 en route to Constantinople, and St. Sophronius of Vratsa worked as a teacher in Karabunar in 1792–1793. Russian Army data from 1827 mentions it as a purely Bulgarian village and it was visited by Vasil Levski in 1868. During the Russo-Turkish War of 1877–78, the area was occupied by the Russian 93rd Irkutsk Infantry Regiment on 16 February 1878. Karabunar became part of the autonomous province of Eastern Rumelia after the war and was annexed by the Principality of Bulgaria in 1885.

The village was renamed Sredets on 14 August 1934. Under Communist rule, the village was renamed Grudovo on 1 June 1950 in honour of Todor Grudov, a leader of the Communist September Uprising of 1923 and former mayor of the village. Grudovo was granted the status of town on 6 February 1960 and, following the fall of Communism in Bulgaria, on 23 January 1993, the town was renamed Sredets.

== Municipality ==
Sredets is also the seat of Sredets municipality (part of Burgas Province), which in addition to the town also includes the following 31 villages:

- Belevren
- Belila
- Bistrets
- Bogdanovo
- Debelt
- Dolno Yabalkovo
- Draka
- Drachevo
- Dyulevo
- Fakiya
- Golyamo Bukovo
- Gorno Yabalkovo
- Granichar
- Granitets
- Kirovo
- Kubadin
- Malina
- Momina Tsarkva
- Orlintsi
- Panchevo
- Prohod
- Radoynovo
- Rosenovo
- Svetlina
- Sinyo Kamene
- Slivovo
- Suhodol
- Trakiytsi
- Varovnik
- Valchanovo
- Zagortsi
- Zornitsa
