= Gospodarevska reka =

Location
- Country: Bulgaria

Physical characteristics
- Source
  - location: Bakadzhitsite
  - coordinates: 42°26′58.92″N 26°43′22.08″E
  - elevation: 360 m (1,180 ft)
- Mouth
  - location: Sredetska reka
  - coordinates: 42°21′50.04″N 27°12′29.16″E
  - elevation: 13 m (43 ft)
- Length: 70 km (43 mi)
- Basin size: 422 km^{2} (163 sq mi)

Basin features
- Progression: Sredetska reka → Lake Mandrensko → Black Sea

The Gospodarevska reka (Bulgarian: Господаревска река) is a 70 km long river in southeastern Bulgaria, a left tributary of the Sredetska reka, which flows into Lake Mandrensko draining into the Black Sea.

The river takes its source in the Bakadzhitsite heights, some 3.2 km south of the village of Irichekovo. It flows in direction southeast in a shallow valley, forming numerous meanders in its middle and lower course. The river flows into the Sredetska reka at an altitude of 13 m about 1.8 km northeast of the town of Sredets.

Its drainage basin covers a territory of 422 km^{2}, or 42.8% of the Sredetska reka's total. The river has predominantly rain feed.

The Gospodarevska reka flows in Burgas and Yambol Provinces. There are six villages along its course, Lyulin, Parvenets and Pravdino in Straldzha Municipality of Yambol Province and Malina, Zagortsi and Svetlina in Sredets Municipality of Burgas Province. Its waters are utilised for irrigation of significant area of farmland, with 20 microdams constructed in its basin.
