= II-53 road (Bulgaria) =

Road in Bulgaria

Republic Road I-53
- Републикански път I-53

Route information
- Length: 212.1 km (131.8 mi)

Major junctions
- From: Km 90.9 of I-5, Polikraishte
- To: Km 65.7 of II-79 in Sredets

Location
- Country: Bulgaria
- Towns: Gorna Oryahovitsa, Lyaskovets, Sliven, Yambol, Sredets

Highway system
- Highways in Bulgaria

Republican Road II-53 (Bulgarian: Републикански път II-53) is a 2nd class road in Bulgaria, running in general direction northwest–southeast through the territory of Veliko Tarnovo, Sliven, Yambol and Burgas Provinces. With a length of 212.1 km, it is the third longest second class route in the country, after II-37 road and II-11 road.

== Route description ==
The road starts at Km 90.9 of the first class I-5 road in the center of the village of Polikraishte in Veliko Tarnovo Province and heads southeast. It passes through the village of Parvomaytsi, crosses the river Yantra and southeast of the towns of Gorna Oryahovitsa and Lyaskovets forms a junction at Km 136.4 of the first class I-4 road. It then goes through the villages of Dragizhevo and Merdanya, enters of the valley of the river Veselina of the Yantra basin, passes through the village of Mindya and reaches the river Zlatarishka reka, a right tributary of the Veselina. The road runs south upstream along its valley and reaches the town of Elena, where it turns east. It then passes through the villages of Maryan, Bebrovo, Konstantin and at Maysko it turns south, descends to the valley of the river Stara reka and enters Sliven Province.

In Sliven Province the II-53 road passes through the village of Stara Reka and ascends the northern slopes of the Balkan Mountains through the Vratnik Pass (1,050 m). Descending through the southern slopes of the mountain range, it runs through the village of Byala and following the valley of the Asenovska reka, a left tributary of the Tundzha, it reaches the city of Sliven. From there, the road continues in direction southeast through the Sliven Valley, forms a junction with the first class I-6 road, passes through the village of Krushare, crosses the Tundzha and enters Yambol Province.

There, the road crosses the low easternmost reaches of the Sredna Gora mountain range and descends to the valley of the Tundzha, forming a junction with the Trakia motorway, before passing through the city of Yambol and again crossing the Tundzha. It then continues southeast and east along the southern slopes of the Bakadzhitsite Heights, forming a junction with the first class I-7 road and running through the villages of Kalchevo, Pobeda, Chelnik, Tamarino and Voynika, before entering Burgas Province. The road passes through Zornitsa, Zagortsi and Svetlina and descends to the valley of the river Sredetska reka, which it crosses before reaching the town of Sredets. It crosses the town and reaches its terminus at Km 65.7 of the second class II-79 road.
