= Fakiyska reka =

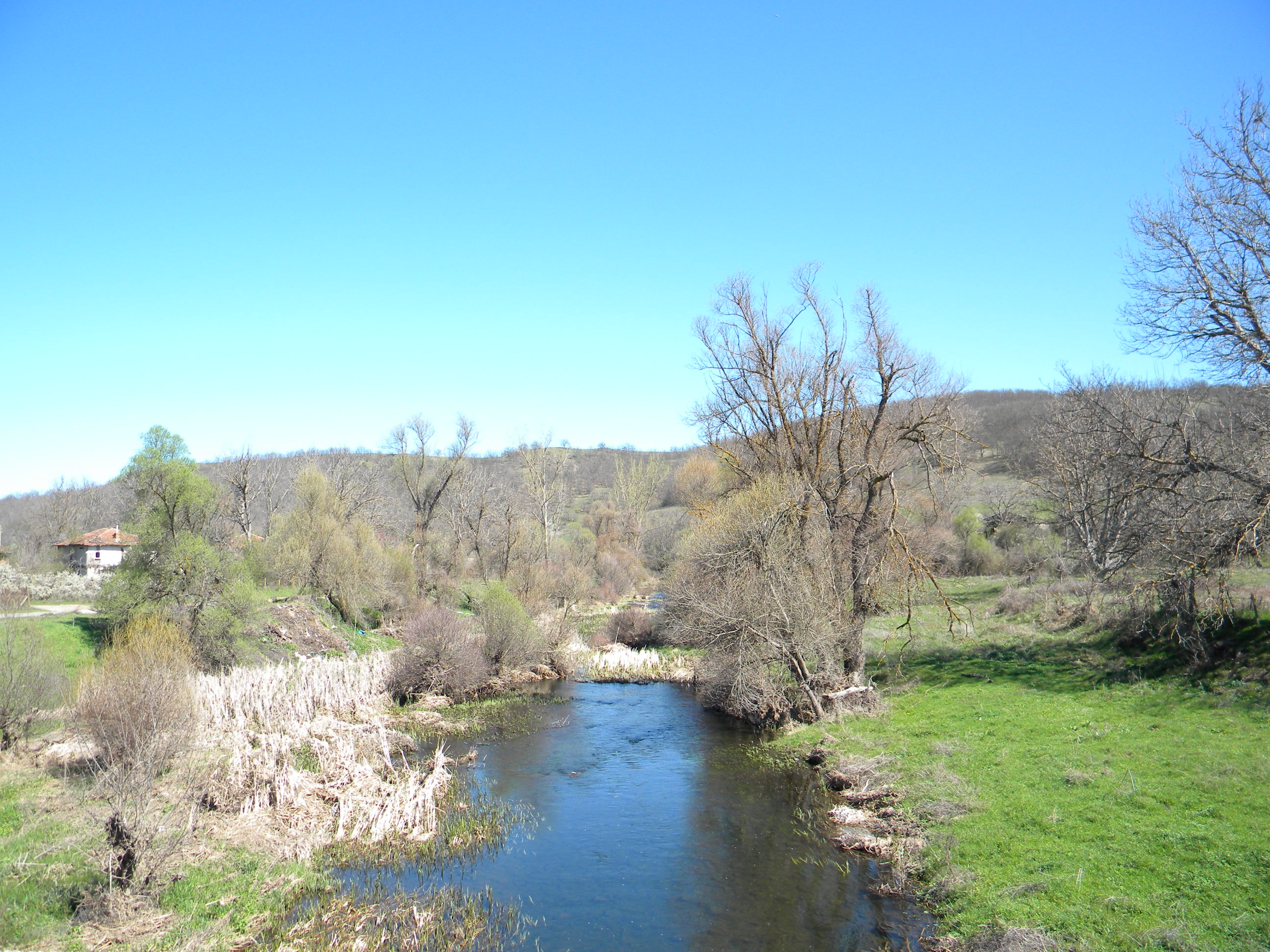

Location
- Country: Bulgaria

Physical characteristics
- Source
  - location: western Strandzha
  - coordinates: 42°4′46.92″N 27°0′11.88″E
  - elevation: 463 m (1,519 ft)
- Mouth
  - location: Lake Mandrensko → Black Sea
  - coordinates: 42°23′40.92″N 27°23′20.04″E
  - elevation: 6 m (20 ft)
- Length: 87 km (54 mi)
- Basin size: 641 km^{2} (247 sq mi)

The Fakiyska reka (Bulgarian: Факийска река) is a 87 km long river in eastern Bulgaria that flows into Lake Burgas, which drains into the Black Sea.

The river takes its source under the name Garkova reka at an altitude of 463 m in the western part of the Strandzha mountain range, some 1.7 km north of the village of Strandzha just north of the Bulgaria–Turkey border. It initially flows in a deforested valley direction north until the village of Momina Tsarkva, northeast until Fakiya and east until Golyamo Bukovo. It then enters a deep, narrow and forested valley with many meanders, which separates the Strandzhan ridges of Karatepe to the northwest and Bosna to the southeast. Downstream of the abandoned village of Rakov Dol the valley widens and downstream of Zidarovo enters the Burgas Plain, where the Fakiyska reka forms a wide alluvial valley. It flows into Lake Mandrensko some 1.5 km southwest of the village of Dimchevo. The lake itself drains into the Gulf of Burgas in the Black Sea.

Its drainage basin covers a territory of 641 km^{2}. It borders the basins of the Sredetska reka to the northwest, the Veleka and the Izvorska reka to the southeast, the three flowing into the Black Sea, as well as the basins of the Tundzha and the Maritsa to the southwest that belong to the Aegean Sea drainage. The river has predominantly rain feed with high water in February–March and low water in August–October. The average annual flow at Zidarovo is 4.84 m^{3}/s.

The Fakiyska reka springs from Yambol Province but flows almost entirely in Burgas Province. There are five villages along its course, Momina Tsarkva, Fakiya and Golyamo Bukovo in Sredets Municipality and Zidarovo and Gabar in Sozopol Municipality. Its waters are utilised for irrigation and industrial supply for the Promet Steel factory in the town of Sredets that manufactures hot rolled steel products.
