= Belevren =

- Village
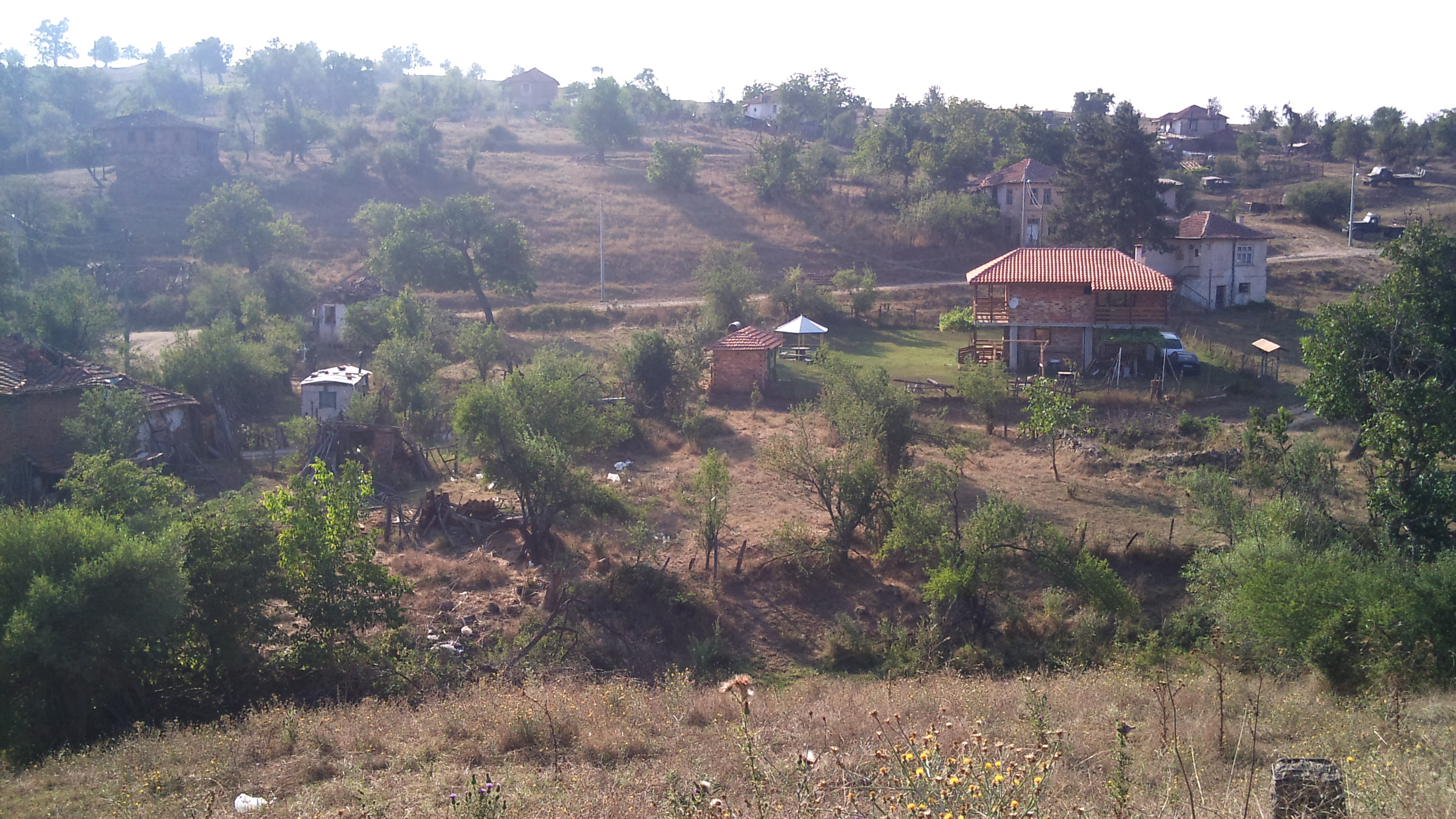
- Overview of the village

- Location within Bulgaria
- Coordinates: 42°06′N 27°11′E
- Country: Bulgaria
- Province: Burgas Province
- Municipality: Sredets Municipality
- Time zone: UTC+2 (EET)
  - Summer (DST): UTC+3 (EEST)

Belevren (Bulgarian: Белеврен) is a village in Sredets Municipality, in Burgas Province, in southeastern Bulgaria. The village borders the following villages: Gorno Yabalkovo, Dolno Yabalkovo, Granichar, and Kirovo. The southern border of the village coincides with the state border of Bulgaria with Turkey.

After the Ilinden–Preobrazhenie Uprising in 1903, the village was populated with Bulgarian refugees fleeing from Ottoman persecution. Near the village have been found ancient Thracian dolmens.

== Geography ==
The village is located in the Strandzha mountain range. 4 km south of the village lies Golyamo Gradishte, which is as high as the highest peak of the mountain range in Bulgaria at 709,6 m.

The Belevrenska reka, which is 24 km of length, runs through the village. The river is part of the basin of the Fakiyska reka, which flows into the Black Sea.
