= Bogdanovo =

Bogdanovo may refer to:

- Bogdanovo, Burgas Province, a village in Sredets Municipality, Bulgaria
- Bogdanovo, Arkhangelsk Oblast, a rural locality in Russia
- Bogdanovo, Baltachevsky District, Republic of Bashkortostan, a rural locality in Russia
- Bogdanovo, Miyakinsky District, Republic of Bashkortostan, a rural locality in Russia
- Bogdanovo, Vologda Oblast, a rural locality in Russia
- Bogdanovo, Voronezh Oblast, a rural locality in Russia
