= Bakadzhitsite =

- Bulgarian: Бакаджиците
- Location within Bulgaria

Highest point
- Peak: St Sava
- Elevation: 515 m (1,690 ft)
- Coordinates: 42°27′0″N 26°40′48″E

Dimensions
- Length: 35 km (22 mi) north-south
- Width: 12 km (7.5 mi) west-east

Geography
- Country: Bulgaria

Bakadzhitsite (Bulgarian: Бакаджиците) are a hilly ridge in southeastern Bulgaria. Administratively, they lie in Yambol Province.

Bakadzhitsite are situated between the Yambol and Elhovo Fields to the west and southwest, the Sliven Valley to the north and the Burgas Plain to the east. To the northeast they link up with the Hisar Heights and to the south they reach the northwesternmost ridges of the Strandzha mountain range and the northern limits of the Dervent Heights. Bakadzhitsite span 30–35 km from northwest to southeast and reach a width of 10–12 km. The mean elevation is about 300 m. Their maximum height is at mount St Sava (514.6 m), rising some 2 km south of the village of Tarnava.

They are formed by andesite, pykrete, basalt and trachybasalt rocks and contain deposits of polymetallic ores. The climate is transitional continental with Mediterranean influence. Along the main ridge of Bakadzhitsite runs the main water divide between the Black Sea and the Aegean Sea basins, with the rivers flowing east belonging to the Sredetska reka drainage of the former, and the rivers flowing north, west and southwest belonging to the Tundzha drainage of the latter. The soils are mostly cinnamon forest, with some karst forms. The heights are covered with low and sparse deciduous forests, and pastures.

There are nine villages on their foothills: Voynika, Aleksandrovo, Lyulin, Pobeda, Tamarino, Tarnava, Chargan, Chelnik and Irechekovo. To the northeast lies the largest city in the region, Yambol, and to the south is the small town of Bolyarovo. A 22.9 km stretch of the second class II-53 road Polikraishte–Sliven–Yambol–Sredets passes through Bakadzhitsite between the villages of Kalchevo and Voynika.
