= Sredetska reka =

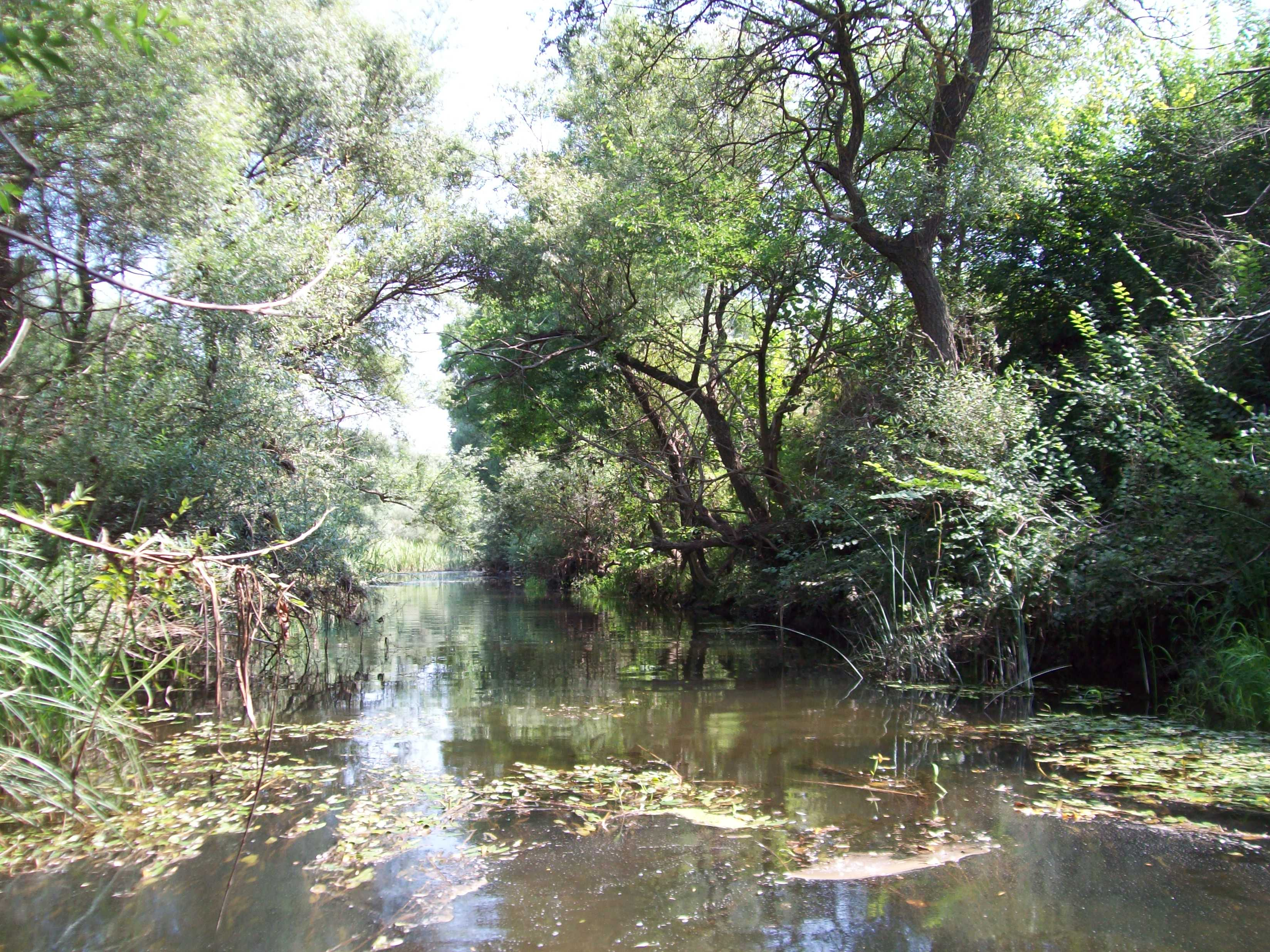

Location
- Country: Bulgaria

Physical characteristics
- Source
  - location: Bakadzhitsite
  - coordinates: 42°16′18.84″N 26°48′38.16″E
  - elevation: 297 m (974 ft)
- Mouth
  - location: Lake Mandrensko
  - coordinates: 42°23′11.04″N 27°18′47.88″E
  - elevation: 6 m (20 ft)
- Length: 69 km (43 mi)
- Basin size: 985 km^{2} (380 sq mi)

Basin features
- Progression: Lake Mandrensko → Black Sea

The Sredetska reka (Bulgarian: Средецка река) is a 69 km long river in southeastern Bulgaria, which flows into Lake Mandrensko, itself draining into the Black Sea.

== Geography ==
The river springs in the northwestern foothills of Kamen Vrah (369 m) in the Bakadzhitsite heights. Some 2.5–3 km from the source, the river flows northeast through a vaguely defined valley with very oblique slopes, covered with oak forests. Downstream the river valley takes pronounced trapezoidal cross-section. The longitudinal slope of the bed is 2.2%, and it remains until the Chetmanska River flows into it. The banks of the riverbed are 0.6–0.7 m high and almost vertical. The bottom of the river is formed by gravels and sand. The Sredetska reka does not form meanders in its upper course. After the confluence with the Chetmanska reka, the river enters a 50–60 m wide hilly valley with shrubs along the rights banks. Downstream from the village of Aleksandrovo the slopes of its banks become steep and deforested and the river reaches a width of 2–2.5 m. After the Chambunar ravine flows into the river, its valley slopes become steeper (up to 20°), overgrown with oak forests. The longitudinal slope of the riverbed in this section is about 6% and reaches a width of 5–6 m.

Near the village of Kubadin, the valley of the Sredetska reka widens to 200 m. The slopes become steeper, rocky in places and overgrown with sparse oak bushes. The river is 4–4.5 m wide. The bottom is covered with gravels and sand. Further downstream, the river enters a very steep narrow valley with almost vertical slopes of 80–85°, overgrown with thick bushes and thorns. The river forms minor meanders. Near the village of Prohod the valley widens to 300–400 m and the slopes become more oblique. The width of the river reaches 15–20 m and riverside meadows reach up to 100–150 m. The banks are steep and 0.50 m high. The bottom of the river is becomes sandy.

In the lower course of the Sredetska reka downstream of the village of Belila, its valley becomes very wide with an indistinct transverse profile. The nature of the riverbed does not change. After the town of Sredets, the river enters section of 1–2 km with strongly curved meanders that reach all the way to the village of Debelt. At its mouth at Lake Mandrensko the width of the river is about 25 m and the depth about 0.80 m, with low swampy banks and muddy bottom.

Its drainage basin covers a territory of 985 km^{2}, or 42.8% of the Sredetska reka's total. The river has predominantly rain feed. It borders the basins of the Rusokastrenska reka to the north, the Fakiyska reka to the south and southeast, both flowing into the Black Sea, as well as the basin of the Tundzha of the Maritsa drainage, including its tributaries the Mochuritsa and the Popovska reka. The Sredetska reka has predominantly rain feed with high water in February–March and low water in August–October. The average annual flow is 1.95 m^{3}/s at Prohod and 2.8 m^{3}/s at the mouth.

== Ecology ==
The whole river course is included in the protected area Sredetska reka was established in 2021 with a territory of 7.07 km^{2}, as well as in the European Union network of nature protection areas Natura 2000 under the code Plana BG0000198 There are mixed riparian forests of pedunculate oak (Quercus robur), European white elm (Ulmus laevis), European ash (Fraxinus excelsior) and narrow-leaved ash (Fraxinus angustifolia).

The river is inhabited by many autochthonous fish species, including several with high conservational importance, such as Mandra bleak endemic to the rivers of the Lake Mandrensko drainage, Bulgarian barbel endemic to rivers along the Bulgarian Black Sea Coast and northeastern European Turkey, round-scaled barbel, European chub, European bitterling, spined loach, etc. There are numerous other aquatic animals, such as Eurasian otter, European pond turtle, Balkan pond turtle, European fire-bellied toad, Balkan crested newt, etc.

== Settlements and economy ==
The Sredetska reka flows in Burgas and Yambol Provinces. There are five settlements along its course, four villages and one town: Aleksandrovo in Straldzha Municipality of Yambol Province and Bistrets, Prohod, Sredets (town) and Debelt in Sredets Municipality of Burgas Province. Its waters are utilised for irrigation. A 7.5 km section of the second class II-79 road Elhovo–Sredets–Burgas follows its valley between Sredets and Debelt. The ruins of the ancient city of Develtos are located near its mouth at the western shore of Lake Mandrensko.
