= Momina Tsarkva =

- Village
- Location in Bulgaria
- Coordinates: 42°08′35″N 27°00′50″E
- Country: Bulgaria
- Province: Burgas Province
- Municipality: Sredets Municipality
- Time zone: UTC+2 (EET)
  - Summer (DST): UTC+3 (EEST)

Momina Tsarkva is a village in Sredets Municipality, in Burgas Province, in southeastern Bulgaria.

== Geography ==
Momina Tsarvka village is situated in Strandzha mountain, only 8 km from the Bulgarian-Turkish border, 8 km from the village of Fakiya, 16 km from the village of Dolno Yabalkovo, and 20 km from the village of Gorno Yabalkovo. The nearest town is Sredets, which is 31 km away. The distance between Momina Tsarkva and the nearest district city Burgas is 61 km. The village is situated in the low parts of the Karvarska peak which is 632m in height. Momina Tsarkva's altitude is 350m above the sea level. The location of the village is inside a hollow surrounded by several hills.
