= Valchan =

Valchan may refer to:

- Valchan, Smolyan, a village in Smolyan municipality, Bulgaria
- Valchan Peak, sharp rocky peak in Ellsworth Mountains, Antarctica
- Valchan Chanev (born 1992), Bulgarian footballer

== See also ==
- Valchanka, village in Kirkovo Municipality, Kardzhali Province, southern Bulgaria
- Valchanovo, village in Sredets Municipality, in Burgas Province, in southeastern Bulgaria
- Valchanov, surname based on the patronymic of Valchan
