= Panchevo =

Panchevo can refer to:

- Pančevo, a city and municipality in Serbia
- Panchevo, Burgas Province, a village in Burgas Province, Bulgaria
- Panchevo, Kardzhali Province in Kardzhali Municipality
