= II-79 road (Bulgaria) =

Road in Bulgaria

Republic Road I-79
- Републикански път I-79

Route information
- Length: 90.2 km (56.0 mi)

Major junctions
- From: Km 298.1 of I-7, Elhovo
- To: Km 241.9 of I-9, Burgas

Location
- Country: Bulgaria
- Towns: Elhovo, Bolyarovo, Sredets, Burgas

Highway system
- Highways in Bulgaria

Republican Road II-79 (Bulgarian: Републикански път II-79) is a 2nd class road in southeastern Bulgaria, running through the territory of Yambol and Burgas Provinces. Its length is 90.2 km.

== Route description ==
The road starts at Km 298.1 of the first class I-7 road in the eastern part the town of Elhovo in Yambol Province, and heads east through the Elhovo Field. It passes through the villages of Zlatinitsa and Dobrich and reaches the town of Bolyarovo. From there it heads east–northeast and enters the northwestern reaches of the Strandzha mountain range — the Karatepe ridge. The road runs through the village of Golyamo Krushevo, enters Burgas Province and turns northeast.

In the vicinity of the Bozhura refuge it cuts through the highest part of Karatepe and descends steeply to the Burgas Plain at the town of Sredets, where it intersects with the terminus of the second class II-53 road. From the town it follows the valley of the river Sredetska reka, passes through the villages of Debelt and Konstantinovo, runs along the northern shores of Lake Mandrensko, crosses the Meden Rudnik neighbourhood of the Black Sea port city of Burgas and reaches its terminus in the southern industrial zone of the city at Km 241.9 of the first class I-9 road.
