= Slivovo =

Slivovo may refer to:

- Slivovo, Burgas Province, Bulgaria
- Slivovo, Gabrovo Province, Bulgaria
- Slivovo, Debarca, North Macedonia
