= Rosenovo =

Rosenovo may refer to the following places in Bulgaria:

- Rosenovo, Burgas Province
- Rosenovo, Dobrich Province
