= 1899–1900 peasant unrest in Bulgaria =

Peasant revolt in Bulgaria

- Date: November 1899 – June 1900
- Location: Principality of Bulgaria
- Goals: Repeal of in-kind tithe
- Methods: Petitions, protests, demonstrations, riots
- Result: Tithe abolished

Parties
Principality of Bulgaria: Bulgarian Army; Police troops; Gendarmerie	Disaffected peasants Supported by: Agrarian Union; Workers' Social Democratic Party

Lead figures
Ferdinand I Todor Ivanchov; Vasil Radoslavov	

Number
Over 1,000	Up to 350,000

Casualties and losses
3+ killed Several wounded	ca. 100 killed Over 400 wounded Over 850 arrested

Extensive peasant unrest took place in Bulgaria in late 1899 and 1900, triggered by the Radoslavist government's decision to replace the land tax in rural areas with an in-kind tithe on agricultural produce. This change, set against a background of failed harvests and widespread corruption, was poorly received by the peasant population, who found the new system financially burdensome and unfair.

The unrest was most active in the northeast of the country, though protests occurred in all agrarian regions. Opposition initially manifested through local rallies and petitions to the government and the prince in late 1899. However, it evolved into mass rallies and even clashes with the government by the spring of 1900. The government responded with force, deploying the military to quell the protests, which led to numerous clashes and casualties. This led to open rebellion in Trastenik and Durankulak, resulting in over 100 deaths. The imposition of martial law, coupled with an improved harvest in the summer of 1900, served to quiet the unrest. However, the disturbances severely weakened the government, which ultimately resigned towards the end of the year, allowing the new administration to repeal the law.

The events had a profound impact on the Agrarian Union, initially an economic and cultural organization that sought to represent the interests of the peasantry. The unrest provided the Union with a substantial boost in support as it positioned itself as the defender of peasant rights against the oppressive measures of the government. This period marked a significant growth in the Union's influence, leading to its renaming as the Bulgarian Agrarian National Union, and helped solidify its role as a major political force in Bulgaria. Conversely, the Bulgarian Workers' Social Democratic Party experienced increased tensions between the orthodox Marxist and reformist factions due to differing views on how to respond to the unrest. This internal strife eventually led to a split in the party in 1903.

== Background ==
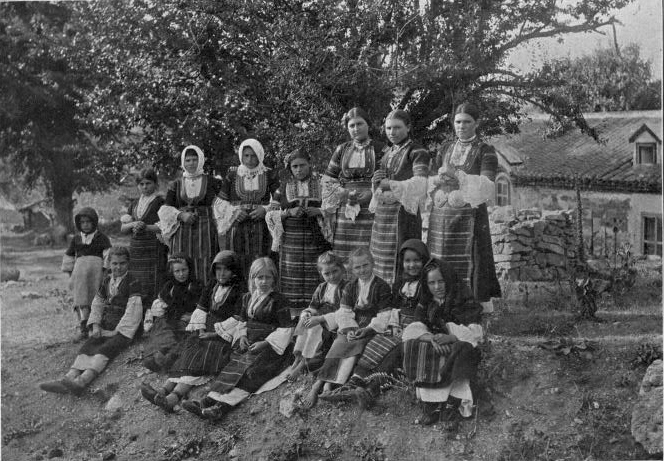
Bulgarian peasants, photographed in 1906.

After Bulgaria's Liberation in 1878–1879, Turkish landowners either fled or were expelled, and their estates were divided into smaller parcels and sold to peasants. The implementation of basic freedoms and universal male suffrage, outlined in the Tarnovo Constitution, fueled optimism for the country's rapid advancement. However, economic growth in the first two decades post-Liberation fell short of expectations, with minimal industrial development and persistent political instability. This period was marked by fierce competition for civil offices, as the expanding intelligentsia strained the bureaucratic system, resulting in widespread corruption within political circles and little ideological distinction among the era's various parties.

The majority of Bulgaria's population, consisting of peasants, faced limited access to education and minimal political representation, primarily restricted to participation in increasingly manipulated elections. While the 1897 census indicated that independent peasant smallholders owned most of the farmland, they struggled with low productivity, usury, declining grain prices on the global market, and a growing rural population. Around 57% of rural farms had plots under 5 hectares, which were insufficient to sustain an average peasant family. This inadequacy compelled many villagers to seek employment in urban areas or as farm laborers on other people's land.

Furthermore, the countryside was controlled by state functionaries, whose appointment depended on their ability to obtain votes through any means; more often than not, these functionaries were merchants and moneylenders who already dominated village economies. To pay taxes or feed their families in the event of crop failure, peasants were forced to borrow money at high interest rates, sometimes up to 100%. A common practice was for peasants to sell their future harvest to moneylenders in the spring at heavily discounted prices, leaving them with only a fraction of their produce after the threshing. When peasants failed to repay debts or taxes, their properties were sold at public auctions. In some cases, as reported by the press, the value of all the land in a village was insufficient to cover even half of the villagers' total debt.

== Direct causes ==
Peasant unrest erupted against this backdrop of pervasive corruption and neglect in the 1890s, coinciding with Prince Ferdinand I's consolidation of power in Bulgarian politics. Peasant taxes, initially modest post-Liberation, substantially increased by the turn of the century to fund public infrastructure projects, the expanding bureaucracy, and the military. The distribution of taxes had also become significantly unfair, with peasants being taxed about 18 times more than clerks and 8–10 times more than merchants.

To account for falling grain prices and difficulty in finding buyers, in 1883 the government replaced the tithe (desyatak) with a monetary equivalent, which was further increased in 1889. The in-kind tithe was temporarily reinstated between 1889 and 1892 by the government of Stefan Stambolov. This period coincided with abundant harvest seasons in Bulgaria and drought elsewhere in Europe, facilitating the collection of the in-kind tax without major disruptions. Revenues from the tithe surged by an average of 46% during this interval. The monetary tax on the harvest, restored in 1893, was replaced in 1895 by a lower tax on land by a new government. Ostensibly, this change aimed to achieve a fairer distribution of the tax burden among landholders. However, its primary objective was to alleviate discontent arising from the implementation of several excise taxes.

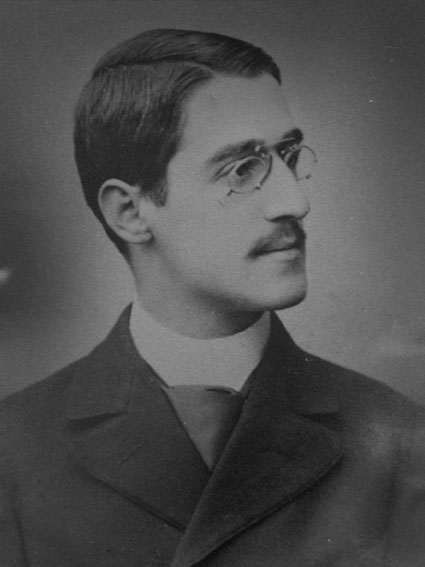
Todor Ivanchov, the head of the government during the peasant unrest

Though campaigning on a program of tax relief for the peasants, Todor Ivanchov's government, installed in the fall of 1899, decided to reintroduce the tithe, which was to be paid in kind with agricultural products. The government justified this new tax by asserting it would alleviate the burden on peasants following a barren year. However, the underlying motivation was the dire state of the national budget: land tax arrears for 1899 had soared to a record 40%, rendering the government incapable of servicing its external debt and struggling to meet the payroll for civil servants. The reintroduction of the tithe was one component of a broader strategy aimed at bolstering state revenues. This strategy included measures such as reducing civil servants' salaries by 7%, imposing a mandatory 25% deduction from their wages, compensating government contractors with bonds instead of cash, raising excise taxes, and doubling road duties. The reintroduced tithe meant that peasants had to surrender one-tenth of their crop to the state, a practice that had been associated with the oppressive Ottoman rule.

In addition to the newly introduced tithe, other factors contributed directly to the unrest. Notably, a series of catastrophic harvests occurred, exacerbating economic strain among the populace. Natural disasters, including torrential rains, massive floods in spring, and subsequent hot, dry winds in summer, significantly compromised the harvest of 1897. Although 1898 witnessed a more favorable crop, the severe drought experienced during the spring and summer of 1899 resulted in a harvest that only reached 75% of the 1897 levels. Compared to 1898 levels, the average yield of wheat stood in 1897 at 24% and in 1899 at 40%. Additionally, livestock suffered from an epidemic of trematodiasis in 1897, while the scarcity of hay in 1899 compelled many peasants to either slaughter or sell their animals at reduced prices. Consequently, by the time the reintroduction of the tithe was announced, grain prices had soared, and certain regions of the country faced near-famine conditions.

The government's decision to remove elected officials who supported peasant interests further fueled discontent. In late 1899, the ruling Liberal Party abolished all village municipal councils. Until new elections could be organized, temporary mayors appointed by district administrators were installed. These temporary appointees were subsequently nominated as the government's candidates in the ensuing elections. In cases where they failed to secure their positions, the elections were nullified, prompting the scheduling of new ones. Consequently, by the beginning of March 1900, nearly all municipalities in northeastern Bulgaria had government-supported mayors.

The period of unrest coincided with the establishment of the Agrarian Union in December 1899, with protests being most prevalent and violent in areas where the Union held significant organizational strength, more specifically northeastern Bulgaria. The relatively subdued intensity of protests in southern Bulgaria can be attributed to its less developed agricultural sector, which made the tithe a more palatable alternative to the land tax. However, violent demonstrations did occur in Haskovo Province (in Eastern Rumelia), which was particularly affected by the severe drought of 1899.

== Course of events ==
=== Initial opposition ===
The first steps toward the reintroduction of the tithe were taken in August 1899 by the Radoslavist-supported Dimitar Grekov government. The Minister of Finance dispatched a circular directive to municipal councils soliciting their feedback on the proposed tax. Contrary to the government's expectations, 83% of the councils expressed opposition to the implementation of the tithe, a stance also endorsed by significant urban municipalities like Plovdiv, Varna, and Svishtov. Despite the opposition voiced by municipal councils, the subsequent administration under Todor Ivanchov pushed for the introduction of the tithe, implementing some measures it hoped would placate public discontent. Additionally, it imposed further obligations on peasants, mandating the delivery of undamaged bundles, permitting the confiscation of food from individuals suspected of concealing crops, and holding villages collectively accountable for any damage to the collected produce.

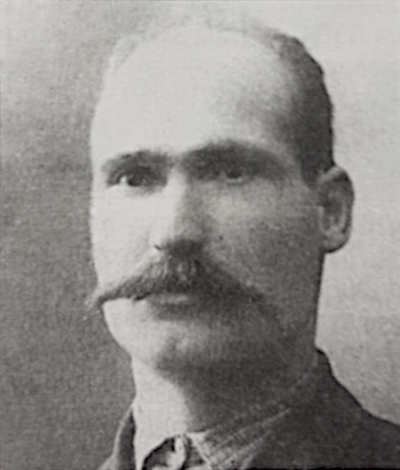
Dimitar Dragiev, an advocate of the peasant opposition to the tithe and one of the founders of the Agrarian Union

The tithe bill was formally introduced to the National Assembly on October 29, proposing an in-kind tithe on cereals and a monetary tax on most other crops. It encountered significant resistance not only from opposition parties but also within the parliamentary ranks of the ruling Liberal Party. Concurrently, from November 10 to 20, the initial peasant rallies against the tithe took place in several locations, including Tencha (near Pavlikeni), Profesor Ishirkovo (near Silistra), Emen, Kaspichan and nearby Kyulevcha, as well as in various villages around Burgas, Pazardzhik, and Svishtov. These demonstrations marked the beginning of peasant resistance to the government's policy. On November 26, the first reading of the bill in the National Assembly began with procedural disputes, resulting in a scandal. Due to extensive filibustering by government deputies, most of the opposing deputies exited the hall after midnight. Seizing this opportunity, the government summoned its supporters and forced a vote at 3 AM, ultimately securing a majority. Although the opposition contested the vote on procedural grounds at the next meeting, the government refused to back down.

Outside the parliament, opposition to the tithe emerged prominently with the advocacy efforts of Dimitar Dragiev, a young teacher based in Radnevo, one of the founders of the Agrarian Union. In May 1899, Dragiev initiated the publication of the journal Spravedlivost ("Justice"), utilizing its platform to promote the establishment of local peasant associations aimed at advocating for reform at the village level and later at preventing the collection of the new tax. Additionally, in September 1899 Dragiev authored a widely circulated pamphlet that emphasized the disproportionate burden imposed on the peasantry by the tithe. The pamphlet argued that the tax would necessitate an expansion of the bureaucratic apparatus for its collection and would confiscate a significant portion—ranging from one-quarter to one-third—of the peasant's harvest. By attributing responsibility to politicians for the imposition of an unjust tax, the pamphlet urged the peasantry to mobilize and collectively address these grievances. The reintroduction of the tithe also faced opposition from the agricultural association across the country. Shortly after the law was publicized in November, the Balchik association protested against what it termed the "injustice committed by the government against the farmers."

=== Organized protests ===
The initial protests were characterized by a lack of organizational structure and coordination, resulting in them being largely ignored by the government. Participants comprised a diverse mix of poor and wealthy farmers, teachers, priests, and others. Although their shared goal was the abolition of the tithe, various groups also sought to advance their own specific agendas. Rural teachers, many influenced by socialist ideas, were particularly active in organizing the peasants for tax resistance. The opposition press attempted to amplify the significance of these protests by publishing resolutions in larger groups, while local organizers aimed to enhance the visibility of the protests by increasing their size or holding them in cities. Large gatherings, such as fairs, market days, and periodic meetings of MPs with their constituents (such as the rally in Byala Cherkva on December 5), were utilized to stage these demonstrations.

Opposition parties attempted to capitalize on the wave of protests, but they generally refrained from organizing peasant rallies due to their relatively weak influence in rural areas. Instead, they relied on their newspapers, resolutions of party clubs in cities, efforts to appropriate demonstrations organized by others, and, in some instances, on reports of party rallies that never actually took place. During this initial period, some peasant demands extended beyond the abolition of the tithe to include reforms in the administrative and financial policies of the state. Thus, the resolutions adopted in Kaspichan, Burgas, and around Svishtov included points such as progressive taxation, reduction of salaries for high officials, introduction of a people's militia in place of the regular army, and provision of medical assistance in rural areas. These demands suggest that the villagers were at least familiar with the minimal program of the Bulgarian Social Democratic Workers' Party (BRSDP) and were likely influenced by teachers who sympathized with the party.

The cause of the peasantry found a staunch advocate in the newly established Agrarian Union, whose creation was accelerated by the protests. The organizers of its inaugural Congress, held in Pleven from December 28 to 30, 1899, intended the Union to serve as an economic and cultural organization. However, fearing that the peasant delegates might come under the influence of the BRSDP, whose supporters also participated in the debates, the Union's leadership reluctantly agreed to adopt a radical resolution addressed to the President of the National Assembly. This resolution vehemently protested against the tithe and called for a reduction in the land tax, as well as the provision of affordable and accessible credit to rural communities. Additionally, the Union urged the establishment of an enhanced school system in rural areas. The resolution attributed the "worse than intolerable" economic conditions faced by the peasantry to the newly introduced tax system, which not only depleted the farmers' income but also eroded their capital. However, calls from delegates for the reduction of salaries for officers and church hierarchy, as well as the reduction of the army, were quietly suppressed by the Union's leadership. Socialists like Dimitar Blagoev and Georgi Kirkov also backed the peasant movement against the tithe, endorsing and fostering the involvement of BRSDP members in protest gatherings and demonstrations against the tax. Consequently, in towns such as Haskovo, Plovdiv, Yambol, Kazanlak, or Eski Dzhumaya, protest meetings against the tithe were initiated by local BRSDP organizations or groups.

Despite numerous appeals, with over 190 rallies taking place after the bill's first reading, the tithe was ultimately passed into law on January 15, 1900. In its final version, the law provided for a tithe in kind on cereals (wheat, rye, barley, oats, millet, spelt, and corn), a tithe in money on all other crops, a land tax on vineyards, and a 40% tax on the value of forests. Additionally, peasants were required to deliver the specified quantity of grains to designated collection points. The adoption of the tithe sparked a new series of peasant protests nationwide. This development caught the Agrarian Union off guard, as its prevailing stance at the time was one of gradual evolution and populism. In an attempt to manage these protests, the Union mobilized peasants for peaceful gatherings and demonstrations. On January 17, the Union's central committee dispatched a telegram to the Prince, urging him not to endorse the new legislation. Consequently, local Agrarian chapters (druzhba) organized village-level meetings to draft telegrams to Ferdinand I, echoing the resolutions passed at the Union's Congress. According to the Union's journal Zemledelska zashtita, hundreds of such meetings occurred throughout the country, with attendance ranging from ten to three hundred peasants. The rally held in Razgrad on January 31 was particularly challenging for the government, as the city was considered a stronghold of the Liberal Party. Despite these protests, on February 7 the Prince proceeded to provisionally ratify the law for a period of two years.

=== Mass assemblies ===
During the subsequent period, the anti-tithe movement expanded beyond North-Eastern Bulgaria to encompass the North-West and the Thracian Plain. In January, new resolutions were adopted in the Ferdinand and Belogradchik districts, followed by mass protests in early February in the Pleven, Svishtov, and Nikopol districts. The Turkish minority also became involved in the protests, endorsing a resolution adopted by Bulgarian peasants in Razgrad and participating in village rallies in the regions of Ludogorie and Southern Dobruja.

The Agrarian Union undertook efforts to pressure the government into repealing the tithe through large-scale demonstrations. The first of these gatherings occurred on February 10, 1900, outside Ruse and in Razgrad, attracting nearly ten thousand participants each. In Ruse, the event was organized by Nikola Kormanov, a moderate leader of the Union, who had collaborated with teachers and students from the local state-owned model farm to campaign throughout the province. Although some peasants wanted to march into the city and assemble in front of government offices, Kormanov successfully dissuaded them, emphasizing the importance of legal and orderly conduct. Following impassioned speeches by the organizers, the assembly unanimously approved a resolution condemning the tithe and urging the Prince to revoke it. On February 16, a subsequent rally occurred in Etropole, marking the first minor confrontations between local guardsmen and demonstrators. These clashes ensued after the guardsmen's unsuccessful attempt to seize the resolution adopted during the meeting.

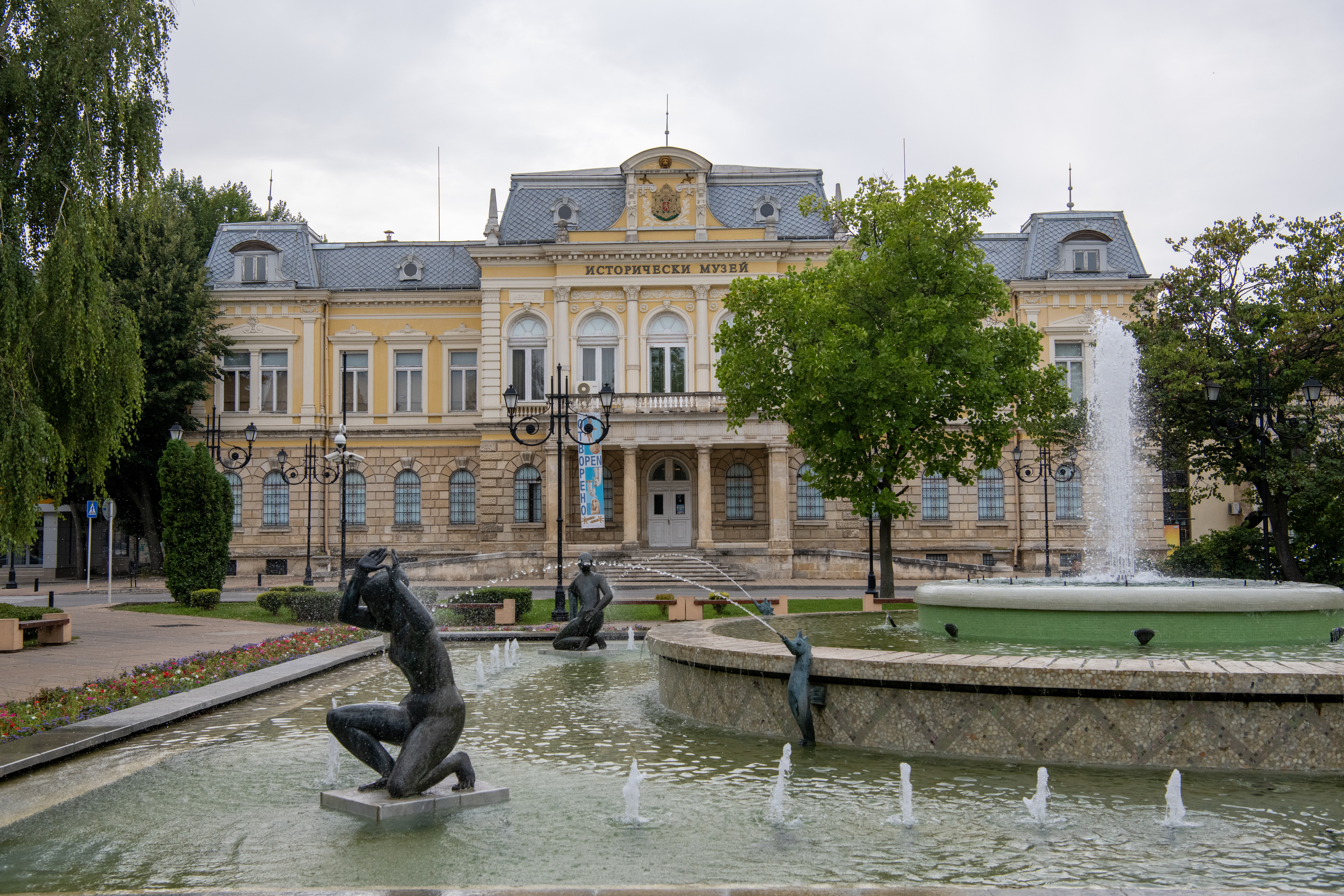
The building of the Ruse Provincial Administration, currently housing the Rousse Regional Historical Museum

In the meantime, in Ruse the authorities responded by arresting Kormanov and expelling him from the province in the days following the rally. They also planned a counter-demonstration for a week later, making extensive efforts to ensure its success. Party supporters were dispatched to nearby villages to garner support, local and state officials were ordered to attend, and an army company was deployed to assist the police, which was further reinforced with mounted guards. On February 18, a lackluster procession organized by the ruling Liberal Party only served to inflame the fifteen to twenty thousand peasants who had gathered in the city's central square. To mitigate the unrest, speakers from the Agrarian Union managed to persuade the peasants to appoint a delegation to inquire about Kormanov's fate. However, the provincial governor refused to meet with the delegation on two occasions. Subsequently, the crowd proceeded to the provincial administration building, disregarding attempts by the Agrarian Union to conclude the rally. As the police appeared unable to control the protesters, the governor urged the local military commander to deploy troops to quell the unrest. The commander refused this request and, after personally engaging with the peasants, successfully dispersed the crowd by pledging Kormanov's imminent release.

The Ruse governor reported to central authorities that the disturbances were orchestrated by a clandestine organization established by the opposition with the intent of overthrowing the government. This prompted the Minister of Interior, Vasil Radoslavov, to issue an order on February 24 equating protests with resistance to laws. With the support of the Prince, he mandated an escalation in police and military presence and ordered the arrest of leaders of the anti-tithe movement. This directive was swiftly executed by local authorities within a week.

=== First violent clashes ===
Extent of unrest in Bulgaria. Most areas experiencing extensive unrest were placed under martial law starting in April 1900. However, rallies and protests also occurred in other districts.

Increasingly large rallies occurred towards the end of February. On February 26, as many as 12,000 individuals congregated in Shumen. Subsequently, on the 27th, mass assemblies of 6,000, 5,000, and 4,000 were witnessed in Silistra, Provadia, and Lukovit, respectively. On the latter date, the Agrarian Union held a mass demonstration in Letnitsa, coinciding with the period traditionally reserved for the largest fair in northern Bulgaria. This timing allowed the event to successfully attract up to 24,000 participants. Despite police efforts to prevent the demonstration, they struggled to distinguish between fairgoers and protest participants. Consequently, the authorities focused on arresting the organizing committee and confiscating its resolutions. The horse guards, backed by a posse of 20–30 armed villagers, attempted to disperse the crowd, using whips and threatening to shoot. The demonstrators resisted, and when the police decided to attack with sabers, the protesters retaliated by throwing stones, injuring a guard and ultimately compelling the police to retreat. Large protests were also organized during February in some southern Bulgarian villages.

The subsequent clashes between the protesters and authorities took place in Varna on March 5, 1900, coinciding with a market day. This large-scale assembly was organized by Yordan Pekarev, a radical member of the Agrarian Union. The authorities attempted to prevent the gathering by touring the villages and agitating against the protests. They also distributed wheat and corn from the drought relief fund to those who promised not to participate. Employing troops that had been mobilized in advance, on March 4, the government successfully barred approximately 10,000 peasants from entering the city, also arresting Pekarev in the process. Nevertheless, up to 15,000 peasants, joined by local workers, managed to reach the city center, where they convened for a rally featuring speeches from local members of the Agrarian Union. Despite overtures from other opposition politicians, the peasants rebuffed their attempts to engage with them. Although organizers endeavored to disperse the gathering by noon, around 500 peasants decided instead to march toward the province's administrative headquarters to demand Pekarev's release, vociferously denouncing the tithe and the government en route. They were soon joined by some of the returning protesters, as well as by onlookers. After initially refusing to engage with the crowd, the governor reluctantly accepted a peasant delegation. During the talks, he stated that Pekarev was not being held there but indicated that he would only agree to discuss Pekarev's release once the crowd dispersed.

The representative of the Agrarian Union once again sought to disband the demonstration, yet a rumor quickly circulated that Pekarev was being assaulted inside the district administration. Subsequently, a new delegation was chosen, but upon entering the building, they were promptly apprehended, further fueling the ire of the protesters. At approximately 2:30 PM, the governor issued orders for the company of infantry defending the building to forcibly repel the crowd with a bayonet charge. In response, the peasants retaliated by hurling stones at the structure, prompting the guards to fire a warning volley into the air. As the peasants persisted in attempting to breach the premises, despite initial hesitation, the soldiers ultimately discharged two volleys into the crowd, resulting in the immediate deaths of two protesters. Five others sustained critical injuries, two of whom succumbed to their wounds later that day, while numerous others suffered less severe injuries, prompting many of the demonstrators to flee in panic. Some clashes persisted until the evening, at which point the army successfully regained control. The following day the government deployed three hundred cavalry and a regiment of infantry to bolster the Varna garrison, with Radoslavov himself arriving in the city to oversee the restoration of order. Martial law was declared in Varna and its surrounding areas, resulting in the imprisonment of 45 to 350 demonstrators. In an attempt to assuage peasant discontent, the majority of those detained were granted parole and released after a two-week period.

=== Increased peasant resistance ===
As clashes between protesters and authorities began, the main opposition parties distanced themselves from the unrest, urging peasants to use strictly legal methods of protest and to prevent further escalation. Despite these efforts, clashes continued and spread beyond Northern Bulgaria. On March 19, a mass assembly was convened in Haskovo by the local committee of the BRSDP with the support of the Agrarian Union. The preceding night, gendarmes from Harmanli and Parvomay were brought in, while police officers rounded up peasants lodging in local inns, arresting those who refused to vacate the town. By morning, all roads leading into the town were blocked by authorities. At one of the town's entrances, the city guard attempted to disperse the peasant column using whips and horses, yet the protesters managed to breach the blockade. On another route, guards opened fire, injuring several villagers, but the column persevered. Violence against the demonstrators persisted within the city; nonetheless, the rally ultimately proceeded with the participation of townspeople and villagers who succeeded in entering, around 10,000 in total. Renewed attempts to disperse the rally resulted in two injured peasants and further 24 arrested and severely beaten. On March 25, another rally unfolded in Lovech, the hometown of Radoslavov, in the north of the country. Police clashed with the villagers attempting to enter the town, but following negotiations, the peasants agreed to hold the demonstration outside city limits. As it coincided with a market day, once the rally concluded, many participants sought to return to town, leading to a stone fight between the villagers and the police, supported by a local posse. After being struck in the head by a stone, the district chief ordered the police to open fire. Although the crowd dispersed initially, they ultimately managed to re-enter the town later in the day without further incidents.

The government's effective suppression of the protests bolstered its confidence, leading the Ruse authorities to initiate a series of arrests targeting leaders of the anti-tithe movements in and around the city. On March 23, the administrator of Ruse Province, accompanied by a small contingent of gendarmes, apprehended several leaders in Pirgovo. However, his attempt to enter Krasen was met with staunch resistance from a furious mob of some 100 villagers, who had been alerted by church bells, forcing the administrator to retreat. Undeterred, the administrator returned on March 27 with an increased force of 32 gendarmes, only to encounter armed peasants, some wielding rifles, who disarmed the gendarmes and assaulted the administrator before expelling him from the village. Concerned by these developments, approximately 5,000 peasants from neighboring villages assembled the following day in anticipation of further confrontation. Upon facing government troops dispatched to quell the unrest, the peasants engaged in a firefight that lasted two and a half hours, resulting in minimal casualties on both sides. Ultimately, the peasants agreed to disarm and disperse, enabling the authorities to apprehend the leaders of the rebellion in the ensuing week. After spending several months in prison, the villagers were all acquitted by the court. Protests continued elsewhere in Bulgaria, with a large rally in Pleven on March 31 being attended by the Agrarian Union's chairman, Yanko Zabunov.

In April, the Marxist-oriented BRSDP aligned itself with the peasant cause, issuing a manifesto that vehemently criticized the Radoslavist government's introduction of the new tithe. This levy was characterized in the manifesto as a burdensome "double and triple tax" unfairly imposed upon the agricultural sector. The document accused the government of attempting to shift the burden of its numerous debts onto the agricultural class. Furthermore, it asserted that the mass rallies allowed the peasants to exercise their constitutional right to assembly, and condemned the government for abusing its authority by instructing the police to violently suppress the demonstrations.

=== Trastenik Rebellion ===
Following a brief period of tranquility, the appointment of a new administrator in Ruse, Petkov, reignited efforts to quash the leaders of the anti-tithe protests. As early as March 26, the villagers of Trastenik petitioned the province governor to remove the government-appointed mayor and municipal council, alleging misappropriation of municipal funds and the imminent distribution of rural pasture to the mayor's associates. The governor referred the request to Petkov, who, while initiating an investigation, allowed the mayor to remain in office. On April 13, Petkov visited the village in person, where he encountered a crowd of villagers who corroborated the earlier accusations. With no action taken by the administrator, a few days later, villagers stormed the municipal office, replacing the mayor—allegedly supportive of the tithe—with a locally elected representative. On April 17, Petkov returned to the village with 25 gendarmes to reinstate the previous municipal council and arrest the leaders of the protest. However, upon their arrival, they encountered a significant obstacle: the villagers, armed with hunting rifles and forewarned by the ringing of the church bell, had surrounded them. Despite Petkov's attempts to call for reinforcements, he, along with his guards and local officials, was captured before any additional support could arrive. In the ensuing conflict, the administrator was thrown from a window, one gendarme was killed, and up to ten others were beaten by the villagers.

During the night, two companies of soldiers and 20 gendarmes, accompanied by the governor and the prosecutor, arrived from Ruse. One company immediately surrounded the village. Meanwhile, the protesters had mobilized support from the neighboring villages of Basarbovo, Karakodjali, Koshov, Krasen, Mechka, Obretenik, Pirgovo, Cherven and the suburbs of Ruse. By morning, the soldiers found themselves encircled by 2,500 to 5,000 peasants, armed with clubs and a few firearms. At 8:30 AM, the governor ordered the army to open fire on the peasants, but the officers refused, citing the presence of numerous women and children. Negotiations between the protesters and government troops the following day proved fruitless; while the protesters sought amnesty in exchange for disarming and releasing the prisoners, the government demanded unconditional surrender. With insufficient troops, the commander chose not to attack the peasants, who continued to gather support from surrounding villages, swelling their numbers to 5,000 by nightfall. Enraged, the governor returned to Ruse, where he obtained approval from Radoslavov to suppress the uprising by force.

On the morning of April 19, the villagers resolved to march on Ruse to negotiate with higher authorities, prompting the commander to order troops to open fire on the protesters. However, the troops refused, instead firing warning shots into the air. In a desperate attempt to quell the unrest, the commander fired at the villagers with his revolver, only to be swiftly captured as some troops abandoned their weapons and the rest retreated. Using the captured weapons, a group of peasants pursued another detachment of soldiers, who also refrained from firing on the crowd. Their commander, however, attacked the protesters with his saber and revolver, killing one and wounding two; he was eventually surrounded and beaten, barely escaping alive thanks to the intervention of an Agrarian Union representative. The remaining soldiers and gendarmes attempted to flee towards Dve Mogili, but were intercepted by two companies dispatched by the government from the Tarnovo garrison. They were soon joined by additional reinforcements: another company from Tarnovo, one from Svishtov, two from Razgrad and two cavalry squadrons from Dobrich. The following day, after unsuccessful negotiations, over a thousand soldiers and gendarmes surrounded the peasants, compelling them to disband. Casualty estimates vary, with reports of 3 to 29 dead and several to 33 wounded. Seventeen peasants were arrested, though many managed to escape, mostly to neighboring Romania. At Prince Ferdinand's request, martial law was declared in Ruse and five neighboring districts, leading to the imprisonment of over 500 villagers. Disputes arose between civilian and military authorities regarding the prosecution; ultimately, only a lieutenant colonel and 64 lower-ranking soldiers were convicted for insubordination due to their refusal to shoot the peasants.

=== Durankulak Rebellion ===
Following the suppression of unrest in Trastenik, protest rallies persisted. Peasants staunchly resisted submitting tithe declarations, while municipal councils resigned to evade enforcing government orders. The government repression also intensified, with dozens of teachers in the Ruse, Razgrad and Burgas provinces facing persecution for their participation in the anti-tithe movement. Such measures included arrests, dismissals, and transfers to isolated settlements. Repression was particularly severe among teachers who sympathized with socialist ideals in the Burgas and Anchialo districts. Protests nevertheless continued. Between April and June, rallies were held in villages near Pavlikeni, Popovo, Sevlievo, Karnobat, Anhialo, Burgas, Byala Slatina, Vratsa, Lom, Bulgaria, Pazardzhik, Harmanli, Kazanlak, Kyustendil, as well as in the towns of Sliven, Yambol, Karnobat, Kazanlak, Popovo and Dryanovo. Expressions of solidarity with the peasants also came from students at Sofia University, Bulgarian emigrants to the United States, and Bulgarian students in Toulouse, Geneva, Munich, Berlin, Ilmenau, Montpellier, Fribourg, and Bucharest. Following Prince Ferdinand's rejection of a delegation from the Agrarian Union, on May 22, the Union's leadership issued a manifesto calling for village rallies across Bulgaria on June 11, as well as mass gatherings in several major cities on June 29 (namely Shumen, Pleven, Kyustendil, Sofia, Pazardzhik, Stara Zagora, Haskovo, Sliven and Burgas).

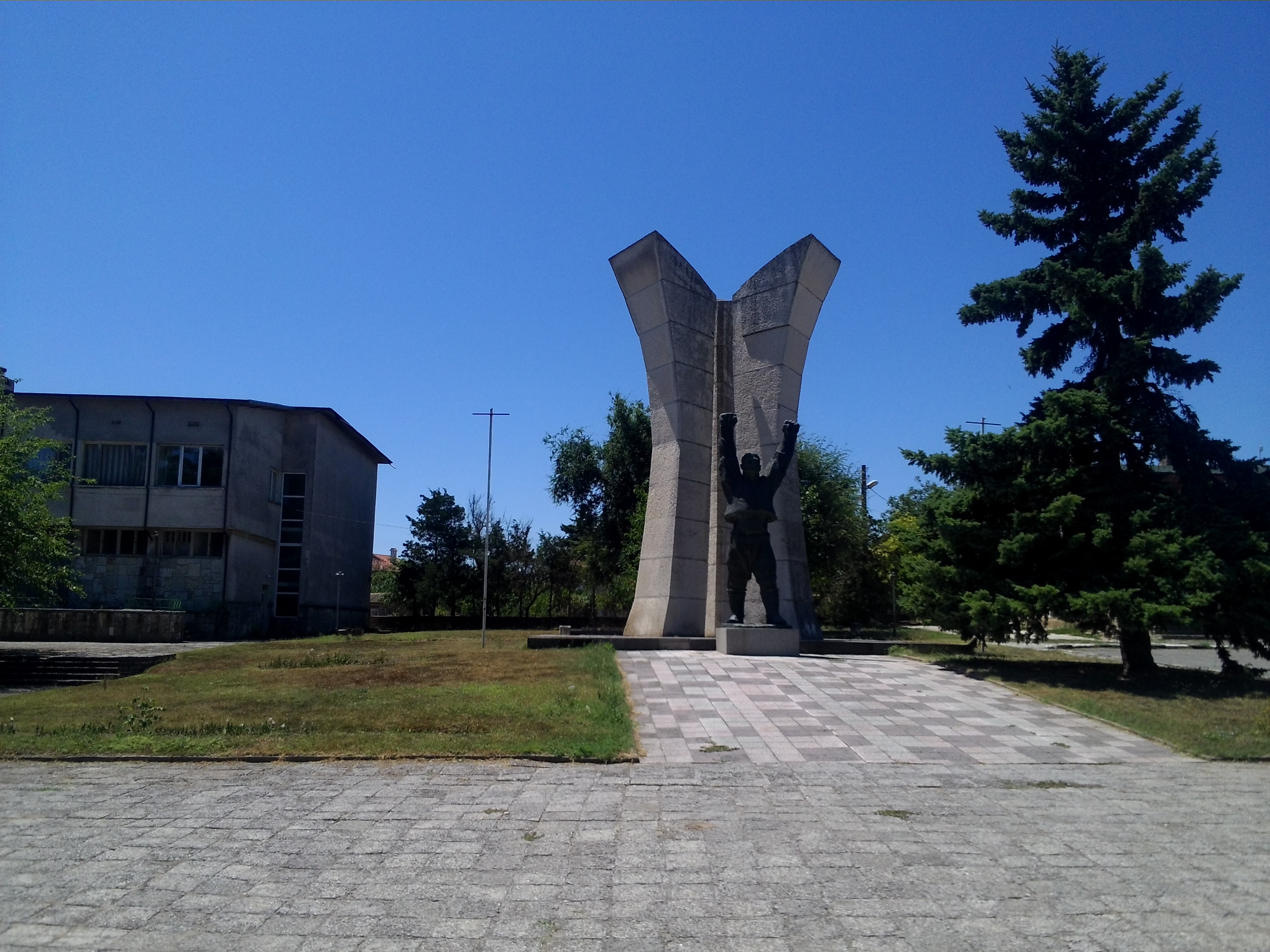
Monument in Durankulak commemorating the 1900 peasant uprising

The most intense clashes between the peasants and the government took place in the vicinity of Shabla and Durankulak. Already on March 19, peasants from several villages met in Shabla to protest against the tithe and condemn the violent suppression of protesters in Varna at the beginning of the month. On May 22, as the deadline for submitting tax returns expired, Vladimir Arseniev, the administrator of the Balchik district, accompanied by a contingent of gendarmes, conducted an assessment of the tithe owed in the villages of the region. When the peasants of Durankulak attempted to negotiate the terms of the tithe, the administrator refused their requests and resorted to swearing at the villagers before departing. Arseniev returned the following day, when most of the peasants were working in the fields, and arrested the assistant mayor and the village clerk, forcing them to walk to Balchik. Alerted by the few villagers who witnessed the arrest, a large group of peasants from the surrounding area gathered near Sary Musa and intercepted the convoy. The administrator ordered the guards to fire on the protesters, but they refused. Confronted and verbally abused by the peasants, Arseniev was compelled to release the detainees, who were then triumphantly escorted back to Durankulak.

On May 28, the villagers of Durankulak organized a peaceful anti-tithe rally with around 1,800 participants. However, the district administrator reported to the governor that the event was a riot and requested military intervention to pacify the protesters. Consequently, two squadrons of cavalry were dispatched from Dobrich, joining forces with the entire police force of the Balchik and Kavarna districts. Departing from Balchik along with Arseniev on May 31, the troops first arrived at the village of Gyore, where they arrested 7 of the 37 individuals they had been seeking, subjecting two of the detainees to torture. Alerted by couriers, approximately 150 villagers from the surrounding area attempted to enter Gyore by nightfall, but they were met with gunfire from the cavalry units. Most of the peasants fled, but a few were captured and subsequently beaten to death while in custody. Although the soldiers attempted to pursue the fleeing peasants, they retreated when the peasants returned fire.

On June 1, the army advanced towards Durankulak, trailed by a crowd of villagers demanding the release of those arrested. Despite threats from the soldiers, the villagers refused to disperse. As the troops passed through Sary Musa, they managed to capture only two protesters and by the afternoon, they had encamped in Durankulak, where Arseniev ordered the arrest of all villagers. Meanwhile, a group of 2,000–3,500 peasants, fewer than 100 of whom were armed, gathered in Gyore and decided to pursue the soldiers. They halted approximately 1.5 kilometers from Durankulak and chose to send a deputation. However, the army, fearing that the protesters were preparing an attack, decided to preemptively charge at the group. A shooting battle ensued, during which the villagers managed to kill the captain who had ordered the troops to open fire, as well as another officer and several soldiers. After firing a few more volleys, the cavalry feigned retreat towards nearby Akkandzhi. The villagers then collected their wounded and moved towards Durankulak. As they approached the village, the troops reappeared and attacked them with drawn sabers. The ensuing five-hour massacre resulted in the deaths of 90–100 peasants, left 300 to 800 wounded, and led to hundreds of arrests. The two deceased officers were interred with military honors in Dobrich.

In an effort to evade capture, 800 peasants, including Pekarev, sought refuge in Romania, while others fled to Serbia. After residing in the Mangalia area for two to three months, they were arrested by Romanian authorities in connection with the assassination of journalist Ștefan Mihăileanu by a Bulgarian national instigated by the Supreme Macedonian-Adrianople Committee. Interned in Bucharest, the majority of the refugees refused to return to Bulgaria, fearing further abuse from the police.

=== Final protests ===
On June 4, Prince Ferdinand decreed martial law in the provinces of Razgrad, Ruse, Shumen, Tarnovo, and Varna, while also increasing penalties for the "abuse of freedom of speech," significantly curtailing press freedom. Consequently, numerous opposition newspapers faced suspension, while the publication of others was severely impeded. The following day, the Minister of the Interior issued arrest warrants for most of the Union's leadership.

The anti-tithe movement persisted in other regions. During May and June, the province of Burgas experienced a particularly vigorous anti-tithe campaign. The resolution passed at the rally in Chemeren on May 29 demanded not only the abolition of the tithe but also the dismissal of the government and free elections. The provincial governor attributed this heightened activism to the significant number of teachers with socialist leanings working in the area. On June 4, approximately 5,000 individuals attended a rally in Karnobat. When the police attempted to disperse the protesters, they encountered resistance from the peasants, resulting in several injured protesters. Around the same period, in 18 villages in the Karnobat district and three villages in the Burgas district, peasants refused to submit tax declarations. In two other villages within the province, peasants stormed municipal offices to retrieve previously submitted declarations, while in another village, locals assaulted the guard assisting the tax collector, who managed to escape. On June 6, the provincial governor requested that the government extend martial law to the Burgas and Karnobat districts and deploy the 24th Regiment to suppress unrest in Rusokastro. The unrest subsided only with the onset of the harvest season.

Opposition to tithe inspectors also persisted around Shumen, where peasants refused to allow government inspectors into the villages. Despite the presence of the army, on June 11, a large rally was held in Marash, drawing peasants from six neighboring villages carrying flags demanding the abolition of the tithe and the dismissal of the government. The rally chose not to adopt any resolutions, considering them futile, and instead decided to refuse tax inspection and payment while adopting a stance of passive resistance towards the army. The following day, the Minister of War was dispatched to Shumen, where he personally supervised the suppression of protests. Rural teachers were interned, and protesting villages were blockaded. Unable to work their fields or water their cattle, the peasants eventually signed declarations of submission, with authorities promising that inspectors would only return after the harvest.

The large-scale demonstrations in regional centers anticipated by the Agrarian Union in May did not materialize, as the peasants were preoccupied with agricultural work in June. Rallies did, however, take place on June 11 in 26 villages. By harvest time, which yielded a plentiful crop, unrest in most of the country had subsided. In August, the dispute with Romania concerning the assassination of Mihăileanu shifted political attention further away from internal issues. Occasional protest meetings against the tithe continued, such as the gathering of peasants from seven villages around Pavlikeni on October 19. However, the absence of further clashes allowed the government to lift martial law in mid-October. Overall, during the period of turmoil, Bulgaria witnessed 148 rural and 49 urban rallies against the tithe, with an estimated total participation of 354,000 individuals from 505 villages.

== Aftermath ==
Following the events in Trastenik, many Bulgarian political figures believed the country was on the brink of a revolution. The foreign press, particularly from Russia and the Balkan states, widely reported on the riots, portraying Bulgaria as a "failed state" unable to govern its populace. The London-based Financial News even called on the Great Powers to revoke Bulgaria's autonomy. In contrast, some European newspapers suggested that Russia had instigated the anti-tithe movement to secure Bulgaria's independence from the Ottoman Empire. The Bulgarian government responded by attempting to shift the blame for the reintroduction of the tithe onto the Prince. Meanwhile, the opposition condemned the government's actions but also advised the protesters against resisting the authorities. The governments of neighboring Romania, Serbia and the Ottoman Empire endorsed the actions of the Bulgarian authorities, fearing similar movements within their countries. Numerous peasants and rural teachers viewed the Agrarian Union predominantly as an anti-tithe entity and thus lent their support to defiance against the authorities. Conversely, the Union's leadership held differing perspectives; the majority favored exerting pressure on the government via peaceful protests rather than resorting to violence. As a result, certain local branches of the Union fell under the influence of other opposition parties, which aimed to oust the Liberal Party from power.

The Social Democratic Party generally opposed the escalation of protests, believing that a revolution would be premature for Bulgaria. Additionally, the party viewed the Trastenik riot as orchestrated by Ferdinand to create a pretext for suspending the constitution. The party's official journal featured extensive discussions on the events in Durankulak and Shabla, denouncing the repression inflicted by law enforcement and the military. However, the unrest prompted certain reformists within the party to advocate a reevaluation of the party's strategic direction, proposing a departure from prioritizing the modest Bulgarian proletariat and instead focusing on the broader peasantry. During his nationwide tour preceding the impending party congress, Yanko Sakazov advocated for a reorientation of the party towards representing the interests of the "productive layers," comprising not only workers but also farmers, craftsmen, industrialists, and merchants. Despite these proposals, the seventh party congress convened in July, influenced by the faction led by Dimitar Blagoev, ultimately rejected a shift in policy. Nevertheless, the congress encouraged members to closely monitor developments within the peasant movement and the Agrarian Union. Additionally, the congress passed a resolution denouncing the violence in Durankulak and Trastenik and extending sympathy to the victims. The party however persisted in regarding the peasantry as fundamentally conservative and refrained from delineating a revolutionary program tailored explicitly for their benefit, indicative of the party's relatively dogmatic, Plekhanovist outlook at the time. Despite efforts to reconcile differing factions, internal disagreements persisted, eventually leading to a split within the party in 1903.

On November 22, the Radoslavist administration, weakened by peasant unrest and the international conflict with Romania, was compelled to resign following revelations of multiple financial scandals implicating its ministers. The Agrarian Union convened its second congress from December 3 to 5, during which it formalized its opposition to the tithe and advocated for enhanced rural education, expanded experimental farms, accessible credit, and progressive taxation. A contentious issue emerged at the congress regarding the Union's participation in electoral processes. Dragiev emerged as a proponent of the Union's political engagement, arguing that abstaining would betray the sacrifices made in Varna and Durankulak. However, the congress failed to reach a definitive resolution on the matter. Additionally, on its final day, the congress mandated a delegation to negotiate with the new government for an amnesty for all peasants detained during the spring and summer unrest. Following the delegation's meetings with the ministers of interior and justice, emigrant farmers were permitted to return to Bulgaria. Furthermore, the government presented the Prince with an order pardoning the officers and soldiers who refused to shoot at protesters in Trastenik.

On January 17, 1901, the Union ultimately resolved to engage in electoral activities. Endorsing 24 candidates in northeastern Bulgaria, among them figures such as Pekarev, Komarnov, and Dragiev, the Union made a concerted foray into the political arena. The elections held on January 28 unfolded remarkably free from official intervention, resulting in the victory of 15 of the endorsed candidates. However, the coalition formed under the auspices of the Democratic Party saw 8 of these candidates defecting to government parties. While the repeal of the tithe on April 24, 1901, marked a significant victory for the Union, the coalition's disregard for the remaining demands of the Agrarian Union underscored ongoing tensions. The tithe, however, was never to be reintroduced in Bulgaria.

By the time of the Union's third congress in October 1901, some realignments occurred within the party: Pekarev returned from exile to a government-appointed position, while Kormanov joined one of the opposition parties. At the congress, Dragiev and his adherents achieved a success by transitioning the Agrarian Union into a fully-fledged political entity, rebranding it as the Bulgarian Agrarian National Union (BANU), with Dragiev voted into the role of vice-president. After 1901, the administrations of Petko Karavelov and Stoyan Danev implemented measures aimed at mitigating the burden of high taxes and addressing the scarcity of affordable credit. Concurrently, improved harvests bolstered the economic prospects of peasants, leading to a temporary decline in the Union's appeal; however, over time, the BANU established itself as one of the most popular political parties in Bulgaria.

== Legacy ==
The peasant unrest and its suppression by the authorities resonated in the works of Bulgarian writers such as Ivan Vazov and Stoyan Mihaylovski. Mihaylovski authored the essay Prologue to the Book of Slaves and the poem Tochilaryat in response to these events. The clashes in Varna, Haskovo, and Trastenik inspired Peyo Yavorov to write the poem Sisyphus, along with four additional poems reflecting on the massacre in Durankulak. The events were also depicted in Anton Strashimirov's story "The Crossroads" and in the writings of Tsanko Tserkovski and Georgi Kirkov.
