= Develtos =

Ancient city in Bulgaria

- Деултум (Bulgarian)
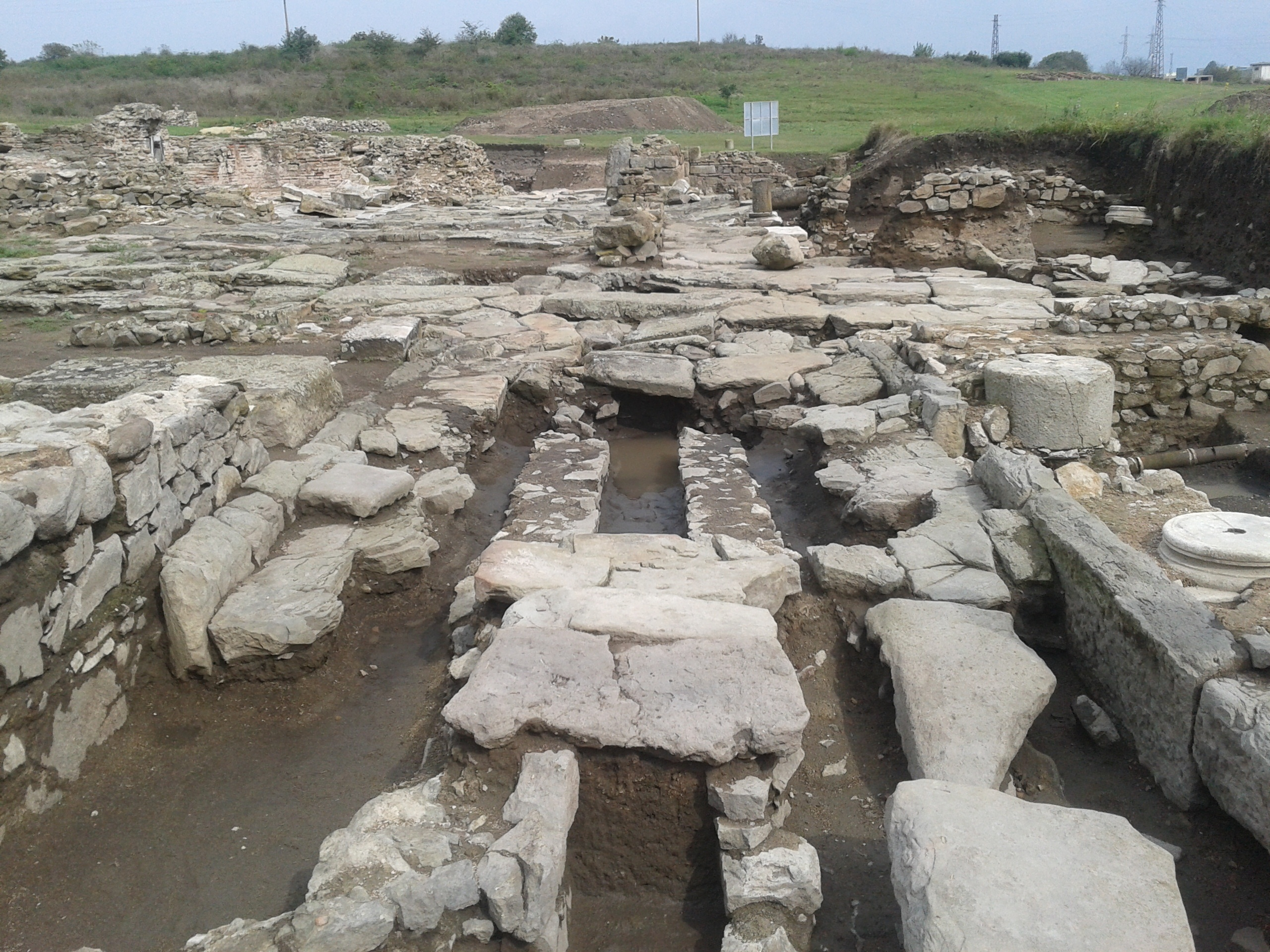
- The ruins of Develtos

- Location within Bulgaria
- 42°23′28.9″N 27°17′20.5″E
- Type: Settlement
- Location: Debelt, Burgas Province, Bulgaria
- Region: Thrace

Develtos (Bulgarian: Деултум, Greek: Δεβελτός, Δηβελτός, Δεουελτός, Δεούελτος, Διβηλτóς) or Deultum (Note: Also known as Debeltos, Debeltus, Debeltum, Develtum, Develtus, Dibaltum, and Deultum) was an ancient city and bishopric in Thrace. It was located at the mouth of the river Sredetska reka on the west coast of Lake Mandrensko, previously part of the Gulf of Burgas, and near the modern village of Debelt.

== History ==
=== Classical period ===
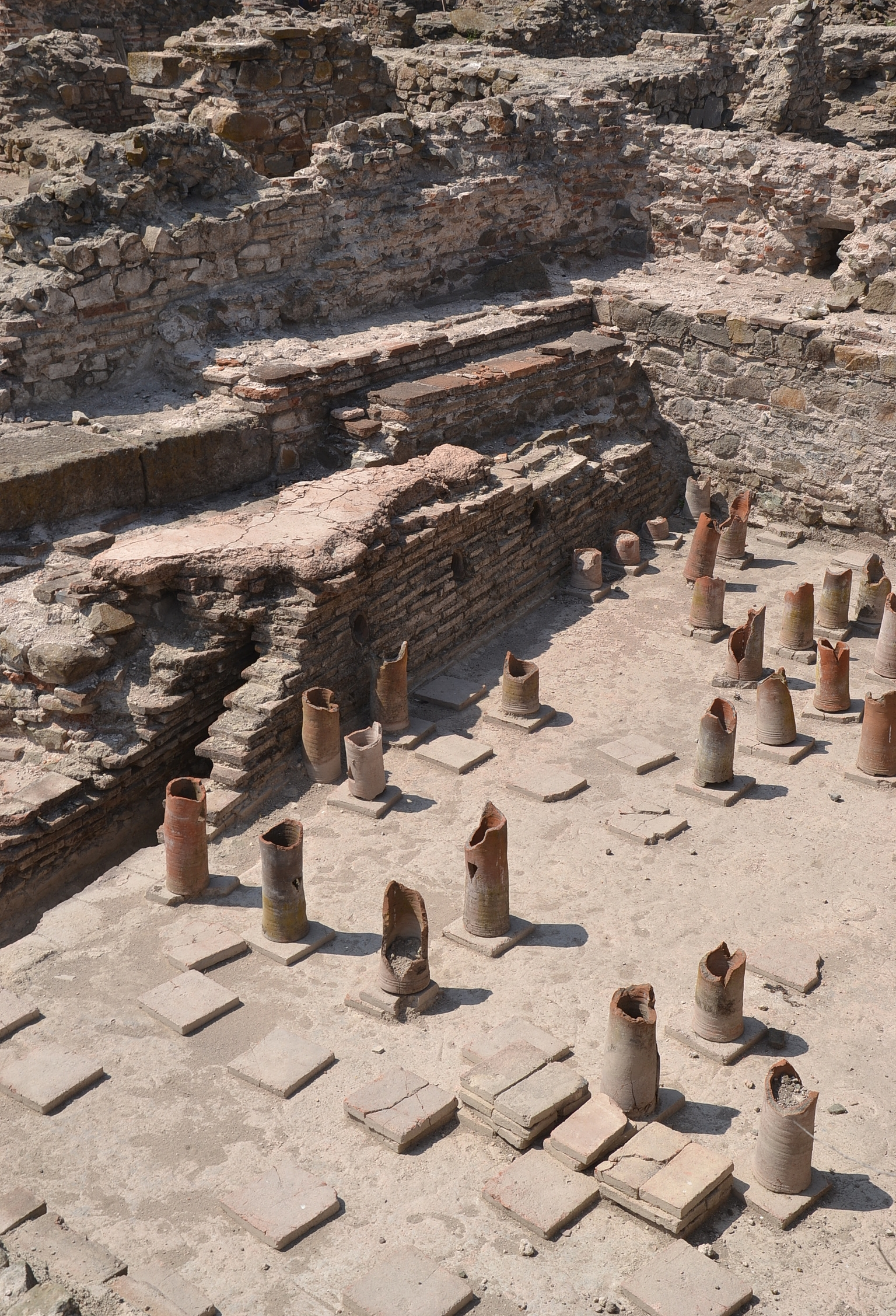
Hypocaust in Deultum

Develton (Thracian: Debelton, "two-swamp area") was founded as an emporium of Apollonia Pontica in the 7th century BC. From the 6th century to the 4th century BC, the settlement served as an important place of trade between Thracians and Greeks.

Develton was annexed to the Roman Empire in 46 AD and became part of the province of Thrace. The construction of a colonia for veterans of the VIII Augusta legion at Develton was likely planned prior to 69 AD, but was delayed due to the eruption of civil war of 69 AD. The veterans may have been settled at Develton due to its proximity to the neighbouring region of Moesia, where VIII Augusta was formerly based. The location was also chosen for a veterans colony as the veterans had the appropriate training necessary for the drainage of local marshland, therefore allowing the area to be developed and exploited. The colonia was thus built during the reign of Emperor Vespasian, and was named Colonia Flavia Pacis Deultensium, or Colonia Flavia Pancensis Deultum. The inclusion of "peace" (Pacis) in the title of the colony probably referred to the conclusion of the civil war. The city had an extensive territory, as testified by inscriptions in Panchevo and Sladki Kladenci near Burgas.

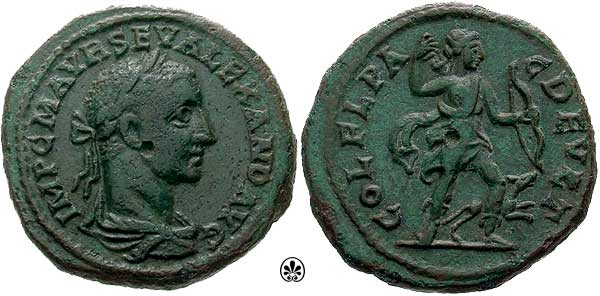
A bronze coin of Severus Alexander minted at Deultum

Pliny the Elder makes reference to the city in his Naturalis Historia. In 82 AD, the population of Deultum petitioned Titus Avidius Quietus to become a patron of the city. Commemorative bronze coins were minted by Emperor Trajan to celebrate the 30th anniversary of the foundation of Deultum. Between 130 and 150 AD, the city suffered serious damage from barbarian attacks.

By the end of the 2nd century and the beginning of the 3rd century, Deultum had an area of approximately 62 acres (0.25 km^{2}) and there were temples dedicated to Asclepius and Cybele. A mint was active at Deultum from the reign of Caracalla to that of Emperor Philip the Arab. The city is mentioned in the Antonine Itinerary, composed in the early 3rd century. Following his ascension to the throne, Emperor Philip the Arab travelled through Deultum in 244 en route from Circesium to Rome, and adventus coins were minted to celebrate his presence.

Deultum was sacked by Goths in the second half of the 3rd century and was rebuilt shortly after. The city later became part of the province of Haemimontus, and Emperor Diocletian travelled through Deultum in 294 whilst en route from Sirmium to Nicomedia. Legions I Flavia Pacis, II Flavia Pacatiana, and III Flavia Pacis may have been levied at Deultum and its environs by Diocletian or Emperor Constantius II.

At the Battle of Deultum in the summer of 377 during the Gothic War of 376–382 an Eastern Roman army was defeated by a Gothic raiding party outside Deultum, and the city was sacked. Deultum was later rebuilt on a smaller scale, and, in the second half of the 5th century, new walls were constructed and all unprotected buildings were demolished to ensure hostile forces did not use them as cover. However, the walls were destroyed by Slavs and Avars at the end of the 6th century.

=== Medieval period ===
Develtos lay on the border with Bulgaria after the Treaty of 716 between Emperor Theodosius III and Khan Tervel, and became a significant defensive post in the war with the Bulgarians. As a consequence of the treaty, the city was situated at the edge of a depopulated no man's land known as Zagoria ("beyond the [Haemus] mountains") to the Bulgarians. The office of kommerkia of Develtos is first attested in the 8th century. Zagoria was retaken by Emperor Constantine V in 756, and thus, by the early 9th century, the city had become part of a chain of military bases in northern Thrace which helped confine the Bulgarians to the north of the Haemus Mountains.

In May 812, Khan Krum besieged Develtos and in June the city surrendered. Siphons used to shoot Greek fire, an incendiary naval weapon, were looted when the city was taken. Krum subsequently destroyed Develtos and its fortifications, and forcibly relocated the city's population to Bulgarian territory. The depopulation of Develtos suggests Krum did not initially plan to permanently occupy the territory. However, Krum later repopulated Develtos with Bulgarians, and annexed the city to a new province administered by his brother in 814. The province was subdivided into two districts, one on either side of the River Tonzos, and Develtos was administered as part of the left side by the boyar Irataïs and his subordinates the strategoi Cordyles and Gregoras. Emperor Leo V's victory over Khan Omurtag in April 816 near Mesembria led to the negotiation and ratification of a treaty in September, which returned the city to Roman control.

As per the Treaty of 816, the Great Fence (in Bulgarian), a fortified earthwork palisade, was constructed by Bulgaria northwest of Develtos to mark the border between the two states. Following Bulgarian raids into Thrace in 853, the city was ceded by Empress Theodora to Khan Boris I, by which time Develtos was still partially ruined. Boris I restored the city to the Roman Empire, and may have been baptised at the city, in 864. An embassy sent by Pope Nicholas I to Emperor Michael III in 866 was prevented from entering the empire and was forced to wait 40 days at Develtos, after which the embassy abandoned its task and travelled to Pliska. The embassy was tasked with informing the emperor of the pope's condemnation of Patriarch Photios I of Constantinople, and consisted of Donatus, Bishop of Ostia, the deacon Marinus, and the priest Leo.

Develtos was ceded to Tsar Simeon I in the Treaty of 896, and designated as the site where the annual tribute to the Bulgarians was to be delivered. Simeon I launched his campaign against Constantinople by way of Develtos in the summer of 913, thus beginning the War of 913-927. As per the stipulations of the Treaty of 927, Tsar Peter I relinquished control of the city to Emperor Romanos I Lekapenos, and Develtos became part of the theme of Thrace.

In 1087, Develtos was transferred to the newly created theme of Anchialos by Emperor Alexios I Komnenos. The city was the temporary refuge of Emperor Alexios III Angelos in mid-July 1203 after he had fled Constantinople when faced with the arrival of the Fourth Crusade. Develtos was conquered by the Second Bulgarian Empire after the Battle of Adrianople in 1205, but was recovered by Michael Glabas Tarchaneiotes in 1263. The city declined and was depopulated in the 14th century, either due to Turkish attacks, or due to the sedimentation of its lagoon. Develtos was conquered by the Ottoman Empire in 1396.

== Ecclesiastical history ==
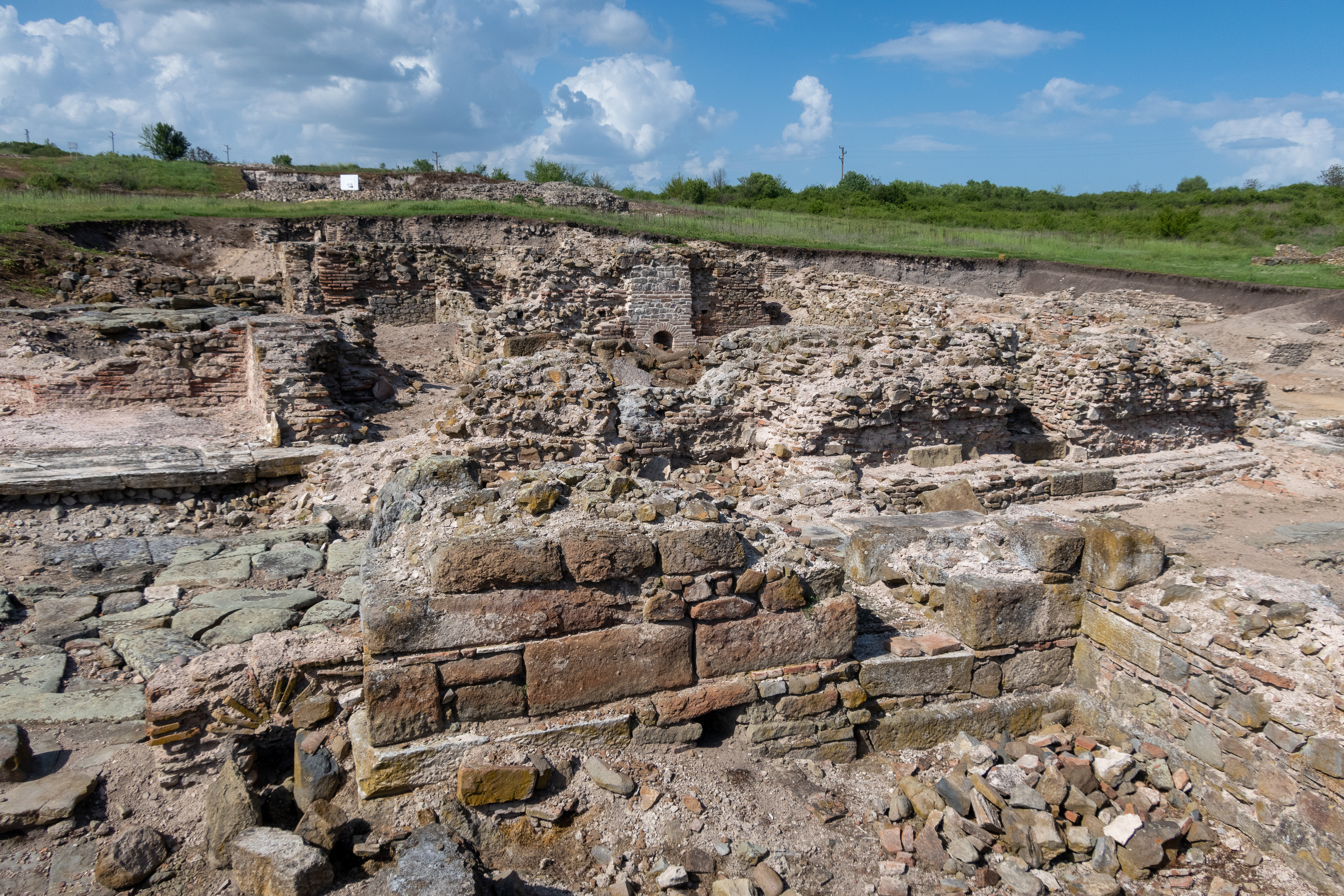
Ruins of Deultum

The diocese of Develtos was established in the 2nd century AD, and Bishop Aelius Publius Julius is attested towards the end of the century. His condemnation of Montanism suggests that montanists were present in the area in the 170s, and Julius likely attended a synod at Hierapolis in Phrygia to combat the heresy. The title of bishop was of Develtos and Sozopolis until the latter became a diocese in its own right potentially in the 5th century.

Athanasius, Bishop of Develtos and Sozopolis, attended the Council of Ephesus in 431, and initially supported the teachings of Nestorius, Patriarch of Constantinople, but later adopted the orthodox position as declared at the council. Jovian or Jovinus attended the Synod of Constantinople in 448 and the Council of Chalcedon in 451. He also signed a letter alongside other bishops of Haemimontus to Emperor Leo I the Thracian in 457 to protest the murder of Saint Proterius of Alexandria. A bishop of Develtos is recorded at the Synod of Constantinople of 459.

Bishop Eustratius attended the Second Council of Nicaea in 787. Saint George, Archbishop of Develtos, was amongst those deported after the city's surrender to Krum in 812 and was tortured to death by Khan Omurtag in 815 with roughly 380 other martyrs who refused to renounce their faith. The see was vacant in 869, but Bishop Symeon attended the Fourth Council of Constantinople in 879. By the second half of the 9th century, until the 12th century, the diocese of Develtos is attested as a suffragan of the Archdiocese of Adrianople. Constantine, Bishop of Develtos, was active at the end of the 10th and beginning of the 11th century.

Develtos was nominally revived as a titular bishopric in 1933, and had the following incumbents:

- Yulian Voronovskyi, MSU (1991.01.16 – 1994.03.30)
- Ignatius Anthony Catanello (1994.06.28 – 2013.03.11)
- John Rodrigues (2013.05.15 – ...)

== Archaeological exploration ==
Excavations have been conducted since 1981 with an interruption around the turn of the century. Structures from the Roman and Byzantine periods have been explored (thermae, a temple of the imperial cult, fortifications). A museum dedicated to the site was opened next to it in 2016. The exhibits include a bronze head of Septimius Severus (from a statue damaged by fire).

In 2020, archaeologists discovered a sarcophagus from the 2nd or 3rd century AD with a Greek inscription which proved that Develtos was a port town. In 2024, an amulet believed to be the earliest Christian relic in the region was discovered there. The amulet, dating from the late 2nd to early 3rd century AD, contains the first known reference to Christ in the region.

== Bibliography ==
- Birley, Eric (1981). The Fasti of Roman Britain. Clarendon Press.
- Birley, Eric (1986). "The Flavian Colony at Scupi". Zeitschrift für Papyrologie und Epigraphik. 64: 209–216. JSTOR 20186432.
- Boeft, Jan den; Drijvers, Jan Willem; Hengst, Daniël den; Teitler, Hans C. (2017). Philological and Historical Commentary on Ammianus Marcellinus XXXI. BRILL.
- Boer, Jan G. de (2002). "Apollonia Pontica and its emporia, ports of trade?". Pont-Euxin et Commerce: La Genèse de la "Route de la Soie". Presses Universitaires de Franche-Comté.
- Bredow, Iris von (2006). "Deultum". Brill's New Pauly.
- Browning, Robert (1991). "Develtos". In Kazhdan, Alexander (ed.). The Oxford Dictionary of Byzantium. Oxford and New York: Oxford University Press. ISBN 0-19-504652-8.
- Campbell, Brian (2006). The Roman Army, 31 BC - AD 337: A Sourcebook. Routledge.
- Connolly, Serena (2010). Lives behind the Laws: The World of the Codex Hermogenianus. Indiana University Press. ISBN 978-0253004123.
- Dikov, Ivan (15 August 2015). "Archaeologists Unearth Odd Early Byzantine Fortress Tower in Ancient Roman City Deultum in Bulgaria's Debelt". Archaeology in Bulgaria.
- DuBois, Michael S. (2015). Auxillae: A Compendium of Non-Legionary Units of the Roman Empire.
- Dumanov, Boyan (2015). "Thrace in Late Antiquity". A Companion to Ancient Thrace. John Wiley & Sons.
- Fine, John V. A. Jr. (1991) [1983]. The Early Medieval Balkans: A Critical Survey from the Sixth to the Late Twelfth Century. Ann Arbor: University of Michigan Press. ISBN 0-472-08149-7.
- Garland, Lynda (1999). Byzantine Empresses: Women and Power in Byzantium, AD 527–1204. London and New York: Routledge. ISBN 978-0-415-14688-3.
- Hendy, Michael F. (1985). Studies in the Byzantine Monetary Economy c. 300–1450. Cambridge: Cambridge University Press. ISBN 0-521-24715-2.
- Hind, J. G. F. (1992). "Archaeology of the Greeks and Barbarian Peoples around the Black Sea (1982-1992)". Archaeological Reports. 39. The Society for the Promotion of Hellenic Studies.
- Hupchick, Dennis P. (2017). The Bulgarian-Byzantine Wars for Early Medieval Balkan Hegemony: Silver-Lined Skulls and Blinded Armies. Springer.
- Janin, Raymond (1960). Dictionnaire d'Histoire et de Géographie Ecclésiastiques, ed. R. Aubert & E. Van Cauwenberch, vol. 14 (PDF).
- Madgearu, Alexandru (2013). Byzantine Military Organization on the Danube, 10th-12th Centuries. BRILL.
- Madgearu, Alexandru (2016). The Asanids: The Political and Military History of the Second Bulgarian Empire (1185-1280). BRILL.
- Ostrogorsky, George (1959). "Byzantine Cities in the Early Middle Ages". Dumbarton Oaks Papers. 13. Dumbarton Oaks: 45–66. doi:10.2307/1291128. JSTOR 1291128.
- McCormick, Michael (2001). Origins of the European Economy: Communications and Commerce AD 300-900. Cambridge University Press.
- Peachin, Michael (1991). "Philip's Progress: From Mesopotamia to Rome in A.D. 244". Historia: Zeitschrift für Alte Geschichte. 40 (3): 331–342. JSTOR 4436200.
- Richmond, I. A. (1945). "The Sarmatae, Bremetennacvm Veteranorvm and the Regio Bremetennacensis". The Journal of Roman Studies. 35: 15–29. doi:10.2307/297275. JSTOR 297275. S2CID 162482151.
- Runciman, Steven (1988) [1929]. The Emperor Romanus Lecapenus and His Reign: A Study of Tenth-Century Byzantium. Cambridge, United Kingdom: Cambridge University Press. ISBN 0-521-35722-5.
- Ruscu, Ligia Cristina (2007). "On Nicopolis ad Istrum and her Territory". Historia: Zeitschrift für Alte Geschichte. 56 (2). Franz Steiner Verlag: 214–229. JSTOR 25598389.
- Sayles, Wayne G. (1998). Ancient Coin Collecting IV: Roman Provincial Coins. Krause Publications.
- Sophoulis, Panos (2011). Byzantium and Bulgaria, 775-831. BRILL.
- Soustal, Peter (1991). Tabula Imperii Byzantini, Band 6: Thrakien (Thrakē, Rodopē und Haimimontos) (in German). Vienna: Verlag der Österreichischen Akademie der Wissenschaften. ISBN 978-3-7001-1898-5.
- Tabbernee, William (1 October 2007). Fake Prophecy and Polluted Sacraments: Ecclesiastical and Imperial Reactions to Montanism. BRILL. doi:10.1163/ej.9789004158191.i-485. ISBN 9789047421313.
- Treadgold, Warren (1988). The Byzantine Revival, 780–842. Stanford, California: Stanford University Press. ISBN 978-0-8047-1462-4.
- Wolfram, Herwig (1990). History of the Goths. University of California Press. ISBN 9780520069831.
