= Dyulevo, Burgas Province =

Dyulevo
- Village
- Location in Bulgaria
- Coordinates: 42°23′42″N 27°09′46″E
- Country: Bulgaria
- Province: Burgas Province
- Municipality: Sredets Municipality
- Time zone: UTC+2 (EET)
  - Summer (DST): UTC+3 (EEST)

Dyulevo is a village in Sredets Municipality, in Burgas Province, in southeastern Bulgaria.
