= Todor Ivanchov =

Prime Minister of Bulgaria (1858–1905)

Todor Ivanchov Тодор Иванчов
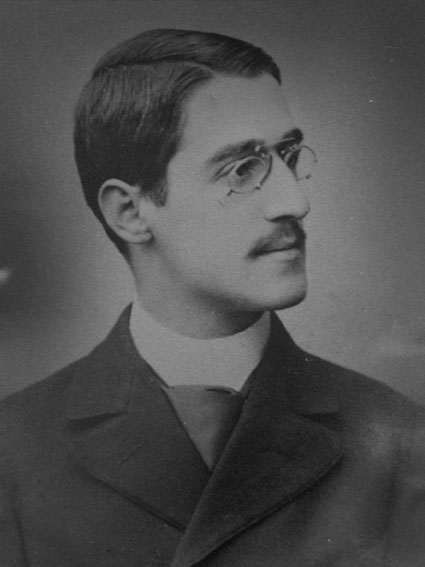

11th Prime Minister of Bulgaria
- In office 13 October 1899 – 25 January 1901
- Monarch: Ferdinand
- Preceded by: Dimitar Grekov
- Succeeded by: Racho Petrov

Personal details
- Born: 1858 Veliko Tarnovo, Ottoman Empire
- Died: 1 January 1906 (aged 47–48) Paris, France

Todor Ivanchov (Bulgarian: Тодор Иванчов) (1858 – 1906) was a supporter of Vasil Radoslavov who served as Prime Minister of Bulgaria from 13 October 1899 to 25 January 1901.

Born in Veliko Tarnovo, he was educated at Robert College and in Montpellier, specializing in economics. He served as the editor of a number of Bulgarian newspapers and joined the Cabinet in 1885 under Petko Karavelov, serving as Minister of National Enlightenment. He was Minister of Education when he was chosen to be Prime Minister in 1899. During his own Premiership Ivanchov also held the role of Minister of Finance. His government was responsible for violently suppressing peasant resistance against the introduction of the tithe. He enacted a series of reforms to improve the civil service. He was, however, considered a weak leader.

In 1903 he was put on trial by the State Court for constitutional violations whilst a member of Radoslavov's cabinet. Sentenced to eight months' imprisonment, he was later pardoned.

Political offices
Preceded by Dimitar Grekov	Prime Minister of Bulgaria; 1899–1901	Succeeded by Racho Petrov
Preceded by Dimitar Grekov	Minister of Foreign Affairs of Bulgaria; 1899–1900	Succeeded by Dimitar Tonchev
