= Orlintsi =

- Village
- Location within Bulgaria
- Coordinates: 42°26′N 27°02′E
- Country: Bulgaria
- Province: Burgas Province
- Municipality: Sredets Municipality
- Time zone: UTC+2 (EET)
  - Summer (DST): UTC+3 (EEST)

Orlintsi is a village in the Sredets Municipality of Burgas Province, in southeastern Bulgaria. As of 2007, it had a population of 353.

GERB candidate Hristinka Shopova won the partial local election in 2018 with 159 votes. The village had a voter turnout of 80%, which was considered high.

== History ==
In 2006, robbers broke into the village church, stealing a bell, a 1.5m high metal candle, and other valuables.

The house of an 81-year-old couple burned down in June 2017. A television was the only item saved from the flames.
