= Siege of Debeltos =

Siege during Byzantine–Bulgarian wars

Coordinates: 42.3892°N 27.2815°E

- Part of the Byzantine–Bulgarian wars
Date	May–June 812
Location	Debeltos, Thrace
Result	Bulgarian victory

Belligerents
Bulgarian Empire	Eastern Roman Empire

Commanders and leaders
Khan Krum	George, Archbishop of Debeltos

The siege of Debeltos was fought between the Eastern Roman Empire and Bulgaria from May to June 812. The siege took place at the city of Debeltos in Thrace and resulted in a Bulgarian victory.

== Background ==
Emperor Nikephoros I invaded Bulgaria and sacked the capital of Pliska in 811, but was killed and his army annihilated at the Battle of Varbitsa Pass as he returned to Roman territory. Khan Krum's peace offer was rejected by Emperor Michael I Rangabe, and the Bulgarians invaded the Roman Empire in the spring of 812.

== Siege ==
In May, Krum besieged Debeltos and used siege engines to bombard the city. The surrounding countryside was devastated in an effort to demoralise the city's inhabitants and cut off their access to fresh supplies. This probably led the population of Debeltos to face starvation, and George, archbishop of Debeltos, was thus forced to negotiate the surrender of the city with Krum and agree to the deportation of the population of Debeltos to Bulgarian territory.

== Aftermath ==
Krum destroyed the walls of Debeltos, and the city's population, including its bishop, was resettled in Bulgaria. Panic spread throughout Thrace as Roman colonists fled the countryside and the cities of Anchialus, Markellai, Beroia, and Philippopolis were abandoned by its inhabitants. Emperor Michael I led an army to relieve the siege on 7 June, however, whilst en route at Tzouroulon, the news of the fall of Debeltos led to a mutiny and the army returned to Constantinople.

== Bibliography ==
- Curta, Florin (2006). Southeastern Europe in the Middle Ages, 500-1250. Cambridge University Press.
- Hupchick, Dennis P. (2017). The Bulgarian-Byzantine Wars for Early Medieval Balkan Hegemony: Silver-Lined Skulls and Blinded Armies. Springer.
- Sophoulis, Panos (2011). Byzantium and Bulgaria, 775-831. BRILL.
