= Draka, Bulgaria =

Draka
- Village
- Location within Bulgaria
- Coordinates: 42°22′N 27°01′E
- Country: Bulgaria
- Province: Burgas Province
- Municipality: Sredets Municipality
- Time zone: UTC+2 (EET)
  - Summer (DST): UTC+3 (EEST)

Draka is a village in Sredets Municipality, in Burgas Province, in southeastern Bulgaria. As of 2012, this rural settlement has a population of fewer than 100 people.

== Overview ==
The village has a local shop, a community center, and a small stream running through its grounds. Draka is also known for its traditional lifestyle, where some residents still maintain beekeeping, livestock such as goats and sheep, and use old-style carts pulled by donkeys or horses.
