= Trastenik (village) =

Coordinates: 43.663°N 25.858°E

Trastenik (Bulgarian: Тръстеник) is a village in the municipality of Ivanovo, in the Ruse Province of Bulgaria. In 2020 the population was 1485.

The village is around 25 km away from the province center of Ruse, with the connection provided by route E85. Agriculture is well developed in the village, with crop production being the dominant sector - the main production of cereals. Cattle breeding and sheep breeding are well developed in stockbreeding. There are favorable conditions for the development of beekeeping in the countryside.

n April 1900, amidst country-wide unrest against the tithe, a peasant rebellion erupted in the village following the district authorities' failure to address peasant grievances against the government-nominated municipal council. Up to 5,000 peasants from Trastenik and neighboring villages resisted two companies of soldiers and a detachment of gendarmes. However, they were ultimately defeated after the government sent reinforcements from neighboring districts.
