= Golyamo Bukovo =

- Village
- Location within Bulgaria
- Coordinates: 42°12′N 27°11′E
- Country: Bulgaria
- Province: Burgas Province
- Municipality: Sredets Municipality
- Time zone: UTC+2 (EET)
  - Summer (DST): UTC+3 (EEST)

Golyamo Bukovo is a village in Sredets Municipality, in Burgas Province, in southeastern Bulgaria.
