= Granichar, Burgas Province =

Granichar Граничар
- Village
- Location within Bulgaria
Coordinates: 42°08′N 27°15′E
Granichar is a village in Sredets Municipality, in Burgas Province, in southeastern Bulgaria.
- Country: Bulgaria
- Province: Burgas Province
- Municipality: Sredets Municipality
- Time zone: UTC+2 (EET)
  - Summer (DST): UTC+3 (EEST)
