= Slivovo, Burgas Province =

Slivovo
- Village
- Location in Bulgaria
- Coordinates: 42°14′00″N 27°00′55″E
- Country: Bulgaria
- Province: Burgas Province
- Municipality: Sredets Municipality
- Time zone: UTC+2 (EET)
  - Summer (DST): UTC+3 (EEST)

Slivovo is a village in Sredets Municipality, in Burgas Province, in southeastern Bulgaria.
