= Bogdanovo, Baltachevsky District, Republic of Bashkortostan =

Bogdanovo Богданово
- Selo
- Location within Bashkortostan Location within Russia
- Coordinates: 55°50′N 56°04′E
- Country: Russia
- Region: Bashkortostan
- District: Baltachevsky District
- Time zone: UTC+5:00

Bogdanovo (Russian: Богданово; Bashkir: Боғҙан, Boğźan) is a rural locality (a selo) in Bogdanovsky Selsoviet, Baltachevsky District, Bashkortostan, Russia. The population was 454 as of 2010. There are 10 streets.

== Geography ==
Bogdanovo is located 26 km southeast of Starobaltachevo (the district's administrative centre) by road. Starotimkino is the nearest rural locality.
