= Bogdanovo, Vologda Oblast =

Village in Vokhtozhskoye Rural Settlement

Bogdanovo Богданово
- Village
- Location within Vologda Oblast Location within Russia
- Coordinates: 58°52′N 41°11′E
- Country: Russia
- Region: Vologda Oblast
- District: Gryazovetsky District
- Time zone: UTC+3:00

Bogdanovo (Russian: Богданово) is a rural locality (a village) in Vokhtozhskoye Rural Settlement, Gryazovetsky District, Vologda Oblast, Russia. The population was 6 as of 2002.

== Geography ==
Bogdanovo is located 74 km (46 mi) east of Gryazovets (the district's administrative centre) by road. Munikovo is the nearest rural locality.
