= Bogdanovo, Miyakinsky District, Republic of Bashkortostan =

Bogdanovo Богданово
- Selo
- Location within Bashkortostan Location within Russia
- Coordinates: 53°37′N 54°33′E
- Country: Russia
- Region: Bashkortostan
- District: Miyakinsky District
- Time zone: UTC+5:00

Bogdanovo (Russian: Богданово; Bashkir: Боғҙан, Boğźan) is a rural locality (a selo) and the administrative centre of Bogdanovsky Selsoviet, Miyakinsky District, Bashkortostan, Russia. The population was 474 as of 2010. There are 7 streets.

== Geography ==
Bogdanovo is located 23 km west of Kirgiz-Miyaki (the district's administrative centre) by road. Yenebey-Ursayevo is the nearest rural locality.
