= Valchanov =

Valchanov (Bulgarian: Вълчанов) (feminine form: Valchanova (Bulgarian: Вълчанова)) is a Bulgarian patronymic surname, deriving from the given name Valchan (Bulgarian: Вълчан). Notable people with the surname include:

- Ani Valchenova (born 1966), Bulgarian actress

Anton Valchanov (born 1975), Bulgarian footballer

- Christina Valchanova, Bulgarian archaeologist
- Christo Valchanov (cameraman) (1915–1984), Bulgarian cameraman
- Christo Valchanov (footballer) (1932–2007), Bulgarian footballer
- Georgi Valchanov, Bulgarian-Romanian army interpreter
- Ina Valchanova (born 1953), Bulgarian writer and journalist
- Ivan Valchanov (born 1991), Bulgarian footballer
- Magdalina Valchanova (born 1977), Bulgarian model
- Nadka Valchanova (born 1948), Bulgarian folk musician
- Petar Valchanov (born 1982), Bulgarian filmmaker
- Rangel Valchanov (1928–2013), Bulgarian actor
- Valchan Valchanov (1940–2016), Bulgarian director and screenwriter
- Vasil Valchanov (1915–2017), Bulgarian sailor
