= Bogdanovo, Arkhangelsk Oblast =

Bogdanovo Богданово
- Selo
- Location within Arkhangelsk Oblast Location within Russia
- Coordinates: 62°24′N 39°45′E
- Country: Russia
- Region: Arkhangelsk Oblast
- District: Plesetsky District
- Time zone: UTC+3:00

Bogdanovo (Russian: Богданово) is a rural locality (a selo) in Fedovskoye Rural Settlement of Plesetsky District, Arkhangelsk Oblast, Russia. The population was 66 as of 2010. Bogdanovo only has one street.

== Geography ==
Bogdanovo is located 50 km southwest of Plesetsk (the district's administrative centre) by road. Gubino and Iyevlevo are the nearest rural localities.
