= Chelnik =

- Location of Chelnik
- Coordinates: 42°23′57″N 26°41′04″E
- Country: Bulgaria
- Provinces (Oblast): Yambol
- Elevation: 184 m (604 ft)

Population (2011)
  - Total: 300
- Time zone: UTC+2 (EET)
  - Summer (DST): UTC+3 (EEST)
- Postal Code: 8678
- Area code: 04778

Chelnik (Bulgarian: Челник) - a village in South-Eastern Bulgaria in the Yambol Province, in the Tundzha Municipality. According to the National Institute of Statistics, in the year of 2011, the village had 300 inhabitants.
