= Gorno Yabalkovo =

- Village
- Location in Bulgaria
- Coordinates: 42.112°N 27.102°E
- Country: Bulgaria
- Province: Burgas Province
- Municipality: Sredets Municipality
- Time zone: UTC+2 (EET)
  - Summer (DST): UTC+3 (EEST)

Gorno Yabalkovo is a village in Sredets Municipality, in Burgas Province, in southeastern Bulgaria.
