= Bolyarovo =

- Location of Bolyarovo
- Coordinates: 42°9′N 26°49′E
- Country: Bulgaria
- Provinces (Oblast): Yambol

Government
  - Mayor: Hristo Hristov

Population (31.12.2009)
  - Total: 1,303
- Time zone: UTC+2 (EET)
  - Summer (DST): UTC+3 (EEST)
- Postal Code: 8720
- Area code: 04741

Bolyarovo (Bulgarian: Болярово [boˈʎarovo]) is a small town in Yambol Province, located not far from the border with Turkey. It is the administrative centre of the homonymous Bolyarovo Municipality. As of December 2009, the town had a population of 1,303 inhabitants.

During the Ottoman rule it was called Paşaköy.
