= Gabar, Burgas Province =

Gabar
- Village
- Location within Bulgaria
- Coordinates: 42°18′N 27°21′E
- Country: Bulgaria
- Province: Burgas Province
- Municipality: Sozopol Municipality
- Time zone: UTC+2 (EET)
  - Summer (DST): UTC+3 (EEST)

Gabar is a village in Sozopol Municipality, in Burgas Province, in southeastern Bulgaria.
