= Polikraishte =

Polikraishte Поликраище
- Village
- Location within Bulgaria
- Coordinates: 43.183°N 25.617°E
- Country: Bulgaria
- Provinces of Bulgaria: Veliko Tarnovo
- Municipality: Gorna Oryahovitsa

Area
  - Total: 32.739 km^{2} (12.641 sq mi)
- Elevation: 89.06 m (292.2 ft)

Population (2020)
  - Total: 1,731
  - Density: 66.7/km^{2} (173/sq mi)
- Postal code: 5138
- Tel. code: 06176
- Vehicle registration: WT

Polikraishte (Bulgarian: Поликраище, also transcribed as Polikrayshte) is a village (село) in northern Bulgaria, located in the Gorna Oryahovitsa municipality (Община Горна Оряховица) of the Veliko Tarnovo Province (Област Велико Търново).
