= Zagortsi, Burgas Province =

Zagortsi
- Village
- Location in Bulgaria
- Coordinates: 42.397°N 27.060°E
- Country: Bulgaria
- Province: Burgas Province
- Municipality: Sredets Municipality
- Time zone: UTC+2 (EET)
  - Summer (DST): UTC+3 (EEST)

Zagortsi is a village in Sredets Municipality, in Burgas Province, in southeastern Bulgaria.
