= Sredets Municipality =

Coordinates: 42.3452°N 27.1812°E

Sredets Municipality Община Средец
- Municipality (Obshtina)
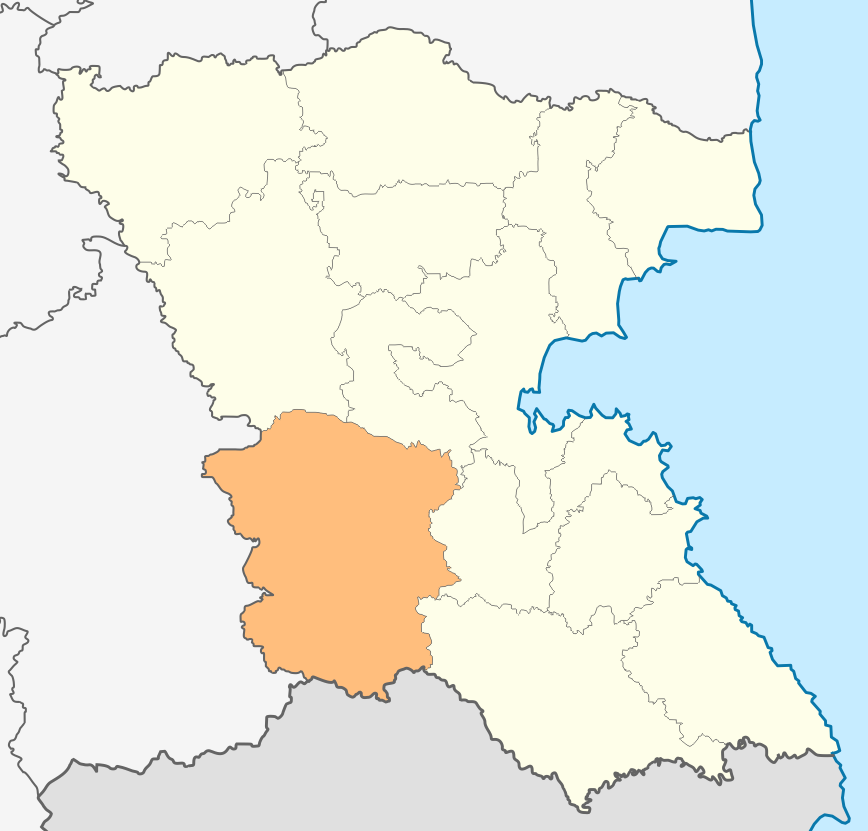
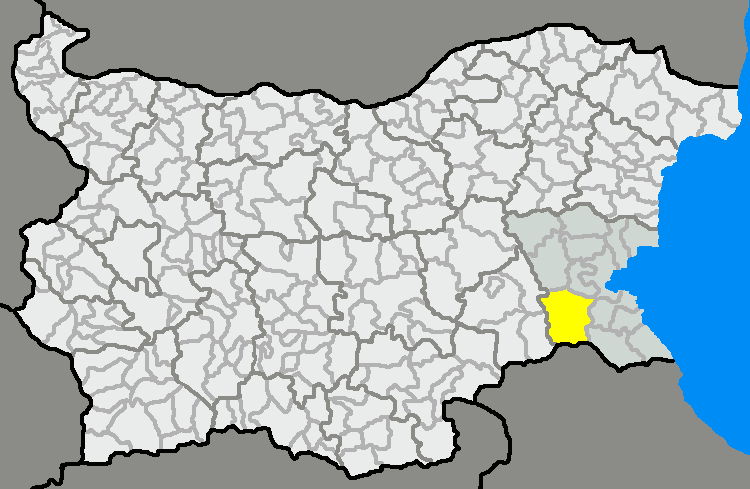
- Location in Burgas province Location on map of Bulgaria
- Country: Bulgaria
- Province (Oblast): Burgas
- Seat: Sredets

Area
  - Total: 1,149.88 km^{2} (443.97 sq mi)

Population (2011)
  - Total: 14,934
  - Density: 12.987/km^{2} (33.637/sq mi)
- Time zone: UTC+2 (EET)
  - Summer (DST): UTC+3 (EEST)
- Website: sredets.bg

Sredets Municipality (Bulgarian: Община Средец, Obshtina Sredets) is a municipality in Burgas Province, Bulgaria. It includes the town of Sredets and 31 villages.

== Demographics ==
=== Religion ===
According to the latest Bulgarian census of 2011, the religious composition, among those who answered the optional question on religious identification, was the following:

Religious composition of Sredets Municipality
Orthodox Christianity	75.5%
Catholicism	0.6%
Protestantism	1.8%
Islam	5.1%
No religion	10.4%
Prefer not to answer, others and indefinable	6.6%
