= Bangladeshi cricket team in Pakistan in 2019–20 =

International cricket tour

	Pakistan	Bangladesh
- Dates: 24 January – 9 April 2020
Captains	Azhar Ali (Tests); Babar Azam (T20Is)	Mominul Haque (Tests); Tamim Iqbal (ODI); Mahmudullah (T20Is)

Test series
- Result: Pakistan won the 2-match series 1–0
Most runs	Babar Azam (143)	Najmul Hossain Shanto (82)
Most wickets	Naseem Shah (5); Shaheen Afridi (5)	Abu Jayed (3); Rubel Hossain (3)

One Day International series

Twenty20 International series
- Results: Pakistan won the 3-match series 2–0
Most runs	Mohammad Hafeez (84)	Tamim Iqbal (104)
Most wickets	Four bowlers took two wickets each (Note: Shaheen Afridi, Shadab Khan, Mohammad Hasnain and Haris Rauf all took two wickets each.)	Shafiul Islam (3)
- Player of the series: Babar Azam (Pak)

The Bangladesh cricket team toured Pakistan in January and February 2020 to play one Test match and three Twenty20 International (T20I) matches against the Pakistan cricket team. The Test series formed part of the inaugural 2019–2021 ICC World Test Championship.

After lengthy discussions by both cricket boards with the threat of Bangladesh not touring Pakistan, the tour schedule was finally agreed on 14 January 2020. The tour itinerary was split into three legs, with the T20Is taking place in January in Lahore, followed by the first Test in early February in Rawalpindi. Pakistan won the T20I series 2–0, with the third match abandoned due to rain. Pakistan won the first Test by an innings, to take a 1–0 lead in the series.

Bangladesh were then scheduled to return to Pakistan in April after the conclusion of 2020 Pakistan Super League to play a one-off One Day International (ODI) match and a second Test match with both fixtures to be played in Karachi. Originally, the ODI match was not included in the International Cricket Council's (ICC) Future Tours Programme. However, on 16 March 2020, the third leg of the tour was called off due to the COVID-19 pandemic. Both cricket boards were looking at a window in the future schedule to play the remaining matches. In July 2020, the International Cricket Council (ICC) confirmed it was their priority to reschedule the match, along with the five other World Test Championship series that had been postponed due to the pandemic. In September 2020, the PCB initially announced that they were planning to host the postponed Test match in October 2020. However, the PCB issued a further statement saying it would be postponed until the 2021–22 season, due to a busy fixture schedule.

== Background ==
In November 2019, after Pakistan gained agreement to host a home Test series against Sri Lanka, the Pakistan Cricket Board (PCB) requested that this series was also played in Pakistan. However, some Bangladeshi players expressed their concern of visiting Pakistan for three weeks. In December 2019, the PCB proposed playing one of the Test matches as a day/night fixture in Karachi. In response, the Bangladesh Cricket Board (BCB) suggested that they would only play the T20I series in Pakistan, with the Test matches played at a neutral venue. The BCB were awaiting on security assessments from their government before the tour itinerary was confirmed.

Ehsan Mani, Chairman of the PCB, stated that Pakistan did not want to play any future home matches at neutral venues. On 14 December 2019, Nazmul Hassan, President of the BCB, said that he was hopeful that the team would get the necessary security clearance to tour Pakistan. However, on 18 December Wasim Khan, the CEO of the PCB said that Bangladesh were still reluctant to play the Test matches in Pakistan, wishing only play the T20Is in the country. Azhar Ali, captain of Pakistan's Test side said "there is no excuse not to come", with team coach Misbah-ul-Haq calling it "a great injustice" with regards to the delay from the BCB. Following the success of the home Tests against Sri Lanka, Ehsan Mani maintained the PCB's position of playing future matches in Pakistan saying "all of Pakistan's matches, against Bangladesh or anyone else, will take place in Pakistan". The BCB reiterated their position saying that they will only play the T20Is in Pakistan, and would make a decision on the Test matches after that. Russell Domingo, head coach of the Bangladesh team, said that he was willing to travel to Pakistan, if the BCB agreed to touring the country. Despite the perceived concerns of playing in Pakistan, twenty three Bangladesh cricketers had registered for the draft for the 2020 Pakistan Super League.

On 7 January 2020, the BCB began to take consent from their players to travel to Pakistan, with a final decision from Bangladesh expected on 12 January following their board meeting. The following day, the PCB revised its offer, proposing that only the two Test matches would be played in January and February. The PCB also proposed playing the T20I matches at a later date, closer to the 2020 ICC Men's T20 World Cup. Following their board meeting, the BCB confirmed that their government had agreed to a tour of Pakistan. However, they stated that it should be a short tour with T20I matches only, citing the tensions in the Middle East. Nazmul Hassan announced that he would travel to Dubai on 13 January 2020 to meet with Shashank Manohar, the chairman of the ICC, to discuss the implications of not playing the Test matches. Ehsan Mani also met with Nazmul Hassan following the ICC meeting to discuss the situation. The following day, both cricket boards agreed to a three-leg tour of Pakistan, starting with a three-match T20I series. However, Mushfiqur Rahim, Bangladesh's T20I wicket-keeper, said that he would not be travelling to Pakistan for the T20I matches. The BCB also confirmed that five members of their coaching staff would also not be travelling for the T20I series. The BCB named their squad for the T20I leg on 18 January 2020, with the PCB confirming the match officials for the fixtures three days later.

On 9 February 2020, the PCB proposed the idea of playing the second Test match as a day/night fixture. The PCB's CEO, Wasim Khan, said that "with Test cricket returning to Pakistan now and many countries also going towards day and night Tests, we want to give our players maximum exposure". However, two days later the BCB declined the offer to play a day/night Test match. The BCB's chief executive officer, Nizamuddin Chowdhury, said that the team was not yet ready to play a day/night Test due to lack of preparation.

== Squads ==
Tests		ODI		T20Is	
Pakistan	Bangladesh	Pakistan	Bangladesh	Pakistan	Bangladesh
Azhar Ali (c); Mohammad Abbas; Shaheen Afridi; Fawad Alam; Abid Ali; Faheem Ashraf; Bilal Asif; Babar Azam; Imran Khan; Shan Masood; Mohammad Rizwan (wk); Asad Shafiq; Naseem Shah; Yasir Shah; Haris Sohail; Imam-ul-Haq	Mominul Haque (c); Litton Das (wk); Nayeem Hasan; Saif Hassan; Al-Amin Hossain; Ebadot Hossain; Rubel Hossain; Tamim Iqbal; Taijul Islam; Abu Jayed; Mahmudullah; Mohammad Mithun; Soumya Sarkar; Najmul Hossain Shanto		Tamim Iqbal (c)	Babar Azam (c); Shaheen Afridi; Iftikhar Ahmed; Ahsan Ali; Amad Butt; Mohammad Hafeez; Mohammad Hasnain; Shadab Khan; Shoaib Malik; Muhammad Musa; Usman Qadir; Haris Rauf; Mohammad Rizwan (wk); Khushdil Shah; Imad Wasim	Mahmudullah (c); Litton Das (wk); Mahedi Hasan; Afif Hossain; Al-Amin Hossain; Rubel Hossain; Tamim Iqbal; Aminul Islam; Shafiul Islam; Hasan Mahmud; Mohammad Mithun; Mohammad Naim; Soumya Sarkar; Najmul Hossain Shanto; Mustafizur Rahman

== First leg ==
=== 1st T20I ===
24 January 2020
14:00
Scorecard

Bangladesh; 141/5 (20 overs)	v	Pakistan; 142/5 (19.3 overs)
Mohammad Naim 43 (41); Shaheen Afridi 1/23 (4 overs)		Shoaib Malik 58* (45); Shafiul Islam 2/27 (4 overs)

Pakistan won by 5 wickets
Gaddafi Stadium, Lahore
Umpires: Ahsan Raza (Pak) and Shozab Raza (Pak)
Player of the match: Shoaib Malik (Pak)

- Bangladesh won the toss and elected to bat.
- Ahsan Ali and Haris Rauf (Pak) both made their T20I debuts.

=== 2nd T20I ===
25 January 2020
14:00
Scorecard

Bangladesh; 136/6 (20 overs)	v	Pakistan; 137/1 (16.4 overs)
Tamim Iqbal 65 (53); Mohammad Hasnain 2/20 (4 overs)		Mohammad Hafeez 67* (49); Shafiul Islam 1/27 (3 overs)

Pakistan won by 9 wickets
Gaddafi Stadium, Lahore
Umpires: Ahsan Raza (Pak) and Shozab Raza (Pak)
Player of the match: Babar Azam (Pak)

- Bangladesh won the toss and elected to bat.

=== 3rd T20I ===
27 January 2020
14:00
Scorecard

Pakistan	v	Bangladesh

Match abandoned
Gaddafi Stadium, Lahore
Umpires: Ahsan Raza (Pak) and Shozab Raza (Pak)

- No toss.
- No play was possible due to rain.

=== T20I series summary ===
The Bangladesh team arrived in Pakistan on 22 January 2020, to play the three T20I matches, having last toured the country in April 2008. The first match took place on 24 January 2020, with Babar Azam captaining Pakistan for the first time at home. Ahsan Ali and Haris Rauf both made their T20I debuts for Pakistan, with the home team winning the match by five wickets. This ended a six-match losing streak for the team in the format. The second T20I, played the following day, saw Pakistan win by nine wickets, after an unbeaten 131-run partnership from Babar Azam and Mohammad Hafeez. This gave Pakistan an unassailable lead in the three-match series, and their first T20I series win since beating New Zealand 3–0 in November 2018. The third and final match of the series was abandoned without a ball being bowled, due to rain, therefore giving Pakistan a 2–0 series win. Despite losing a home series to Sri Lanka in October 2019, and an away series to Australia in November 2019, Pakistan retained their number one ranking in the ICC T20I Championship with their 2–0 win.

Babar Azam praised the Pakistan bowlers saying that "our bowling was outstanding in both the games and helped us keep them down to low totals". Bangladesh's captain, Mahmudullah, was disappointed with the loss, but also praised Pakistan's bowling saying "in the second match they won convincingly because they have a good bowling side". The Bangladesh team flew out from Pakistan later the same day, and returned to the country on 5 February 2020 for the first Test match.

== Second leg ==
=== 1st Test ===
7–11 February 2020 (Note: While five days of play were scheduled for each Test, the first Test reached a result in four days.)
Scorecard

Bangladesh	v	Pakistan
233 (82.5 overs); Mohammad Mithun 63 (140); Shaheen Afridi 4/53 (21.5 overs)		445 (122.5 overs); Babar Azam 143 (193); Abu Jayed 3/86 (29 overs)
168 (62.2 overs); Mominul Haque 41 (93); Naseem Shah 4/26 (8.2 overs)

Pakistan won by an innings and 44 runs
Rawalpindi Cricket Stadium, Rawalpindi
Umpires: Chris Gaffaney (NZ) and Nigel Llong (Eng)
Player of the match: Naseem Shah (Pak)

- Pakistan won the toss and elected to field.
- Saif Hassan (Ban) made his Test debut.
- Naseem Shah (Pak), at the age of 16 years and 359 days, became the youngest bowler to take a hat-trick in Tests.
- World Test Championship points: Pakistan 60, Bangladesh 0.

=== 1st Test summary ===
On 1 February 2020, Pakistan named their squad for the Test match in Rawalpindi. Bilal Asif and Faheem Ashraf were recalled to the team, with Kashif Bhatti and Usman Shinwari being left out. Later the same day, Bangladesh also confirmed their squad for the first Test. Mustafizur Rahman was omitted from Bangladesh's squad due to poor performance, with Tamim Iqbal being recalled, after missing the series against India following the birth of his child. A day after the squads were named, Tamim Iqbal scored a triple century in the 2019–20 Bangladesh Cricket League, finishing with 334 not out, the highest score in first-class cricket by a Bangladeshi batsman. The Bangladesh team arrived in Rawalpindi on 5 February 2020. Bangladesh last played a Test match in Pakistan in September 2003. The same day, the ICC appointed the match officials for the first Test, with Nigel Llong and Chris Gaffaney named as the on-field umpires.

Pakistan won the toss and elected to field. Saif Hassan made his Test match debut for Bangladesh, but was dismissed for a duck. Bangladesh were dismissed for 233 runs late on day one, with Mohammad Mithun top-scoring with 66 runs and Pakistan's Shaheen Afridi taking four wickets. In reply, Shan Masood and Babar Azam each scored centuries for the hosts. Pakistan finished day two with a lead of 109 runs, before bad light ended play early. Pakistan were bowled out just after lunch on day three for 445 runs, giving them a lead of 212. At the age of 16 years and 359 days, Pakistan's Naseem Shah became the youngest bowler to take a hat-trick in Test cricket. He dismissed Najmul Hossain Shanto, Taijul Islam and Mahmudullah in successive deliveries in the 41st over of Bangladesh's second innings. Bangladesh ended day three on 126 for the loss of six wickets, 86 runs behind Pakistan's first innings total. Bangladesh were bowled out before lunch on the fourth day, losing the match by an innings and 44 runs, with Yasir Shah and Naseem Shah taking four wickets each. Naseem Shah was named as the player of the match, with five wickets in the game, including a hat-trick.

Post-match, Pakistan's captain Azhar Ali praised his fast bowlers saying that "the current Pakistani Test team should be led by its fast bowlers". He also praised wicket-keeper's Mohammad Rizwan use of the review system, saying that they were proud of our reviews, after not being too good with them in the past. He also gave credit to the home pitches, and their higher scoring rate compare to playing in the UAE, saying that "the more runs you have under your belt, the higher your confidence is". In contrast, Bangladesh's captain Mominul Haque reflected on the team's poor batting, especially the low total made in the first innings on a flat wicket. He went on to say that the team should take inspiration from the Bangladesh under-19 team, who won the 2020 Under-19 Cricket World Cup the previous day. He said that the U19 team had "really fought back on the ground and we should learn from them".

== Third leg ==
=== Only ODI ===
1 April 2020
Scorecard

Pakistan	v	Bangladesh

National Stadium, Karachi

=== 2nd Test ===
5–9 April 2020
Scorecard

Pakistan	v	Bangladesh

National Stadium, Karachi

=== Third leg summary ===
Ahead of the tour, Bangladesh's Mushfiqur Rahim said that he would not travel to Pakistan, stating that his family was worried about him going. However, the BCB's president, Nazmul Hassan, expected him to travel and criticised his choice of not travelling. Hassan said that he was contract-bound to travel for the last leg of the tour in Karachi, but added "we won't force anyone, but after speaking to all, I think he should go". At the end of February 2020, Mushfiqur reiterated his stance, saying he has been clear about not travelling, and that he will not be going to Pakistan. In March 2020, Mushfiqur was rested ahead of Bangladesh's third and final ODI match against Zimbabwe. Mashrafe Mortaza captained Bangladesh in the ODIs against Zimbabwe, before he stepped down from the position. The BCB appointed Tamim Iqbal as the new ODI captain ahead of the one-off match against Pakistan.

In February 2020, Bangladesh beat Zimbabwe by an innings and 106 runs in their one-off Test match. Bangladesh's captain Mominul Haque said that the win gives them confidence and will help the team in the Test match against Pakistan. On 4 March 2020, the PCB rescheduled the date of the one-off ODI match, bringing it forward from 3 April to 1 April 2020, to allow the Bangladesh team more practice time for the second Test.
