= List of Bangladesh Twenty20 International wicket-keepers =

A Twenty20 International (T20I) is a form of cricket, played between two of the international members of the International Cricket Council (ICC), in which each team faces a maximum of twenty overs. The matches have top-class status and are the highest T20 standard. Wicket-keepers plays an important role in T20I cricket and, over time, the role has evolved into a specialist position.

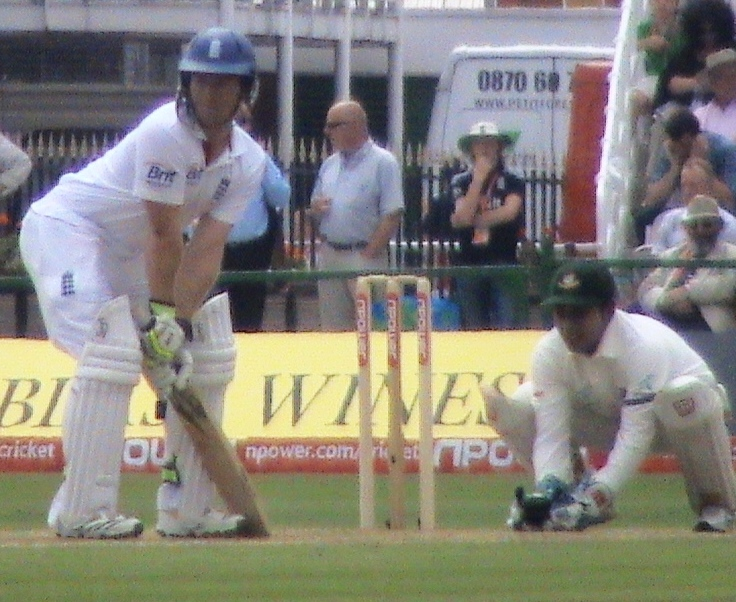
Rahim behind the stumps

Mushfiqur Rahim holds the record of most dismissals, stumpings and catches for Bangladesh in T20Is as a wicket-keeper.

This is a chronological list of Bangladesh T20Is wicket-keepers.

This list only includes players who have played as the designated keeper for a match. On occasions, another player may have stepped in to relieve the primary wicket-keeper due to injury or the keeper bowling.

No.	Player	Span	T20Is	Catches	Stumpings	Total Dismissals	Ref
1	Mushfiqur Rahim	2006–2020	82	32	29	61	
2	Dhiman Ghosh	2008	1	0	1	1	
3	Mohammad Mithun	2014	1	0	0	0	
4	Anamul Haque	2014	1	1	0	1	
5	Nurul Hasan	2016–present	9	2	4	6	
6	Liton Das	2020–present	5	2	1	3	

== See also ==
- List of Bangladesh Test wicket-keepers
- List of Bangladesh Twenty20 International cricketers
