= Sri Lankan cricket team in Bangladesh in 2021 =

International cricket tour

	Bangladesh	Sri Lanka
- Dates: 23 – 28 May 2021
Captains	Tamim Iqbal	Kusal Perera

One Day International series
- Results: Bangladesh won the 3-match series 2–1
Most runs	Mushfiqur Rahim (237)	Kusal Perera (164)
Most wickets	Mehidy Hasan (7)	Dushmantha Chameera (9)
- Player of the series: Mushfiqur Rahim (Ban)

The Sri Lanka cricket team toured Bangladesh in May 2021 to play three One Day International (ODI) matches. All of the matches took place at the Sher-e-Bangla National Cricket Stadium. The ODI series formed part of the inaugural 2020–2023 ICC Cricket World Cup Super League. Originally, the tour was scheduled to take place in December 2020. The Sri Lankan cricket team arrived in Bangladesh on 16 May 2021, following their two-match Test series in Sri Lanka.

Ahead of the tour, Kusal Perera was appointed as Sri Lanka's new ODI captain, replacing Dimuth Karunaratne.

Bangladesh won the first ODI by 33 runs. They also won the rain-affected second ODI by 103 runs, to take an unassailable lead in the series. It was Bangladesh's first bilateral series win against Sri Lanka. Sri Lanka won the third match by 97 runs with Bangladesh winning the series 2–1.

== Squads ==
ODIs
Bangladesh	Sri Lanka
Tamim Iqbal (c); Taskin Ahmed; Shakib Al Hasan; Litton Das; Mahedi Hasan; Mehidy Hasan; Afif Hossain; Mosaddek Hossain; Shoriful Islam; Mahmudullah; Mohammad Mithun; Mohammad Naim; Mushfiqur Rahim (wk); Mustafizur Rahman; Mohammad Saifuddin; Soumya Sarkar	Kusal Perera (c, wk); Kusal Mendis (vc); Ashen Bandara; Dushmantha Chameera; Akila Dananjaya; Dhananjaya de Silva; Niroshan Dickwella; Asitha Fernando; Binura Fernando; Shiran Fernando; Danushka Gunathilaka; Wanindu Hasaranga; Chamika Karunaratne; Ramesh Mendis; Pathum Nissanka; Lakshan Sandakan; Dasun Shanaka; Isuru Udana

On 1 May 2021, Bangladesh named a preliminary squad of 23 players to begin training ahead of the series. Rubel Hossain and Hasan Mahmud, who were both named in the preliminary squad, were later ruled out of the ODI matches due to injuries. Mohammad Naim, Taijul Islam, Shohidul Islam and Aminul Islam were all named as standby players for Bangladesh, with Mohammad Naim being named in their squad for the third ODI.

== Warm-up matches ==
20 May 2021
9:30
Scorecard

BCB Green; 284/3 (45 overs)	v	BCB Red; 288/5 (41 overs)
Afif Hossain 64* (54); Mahedi Hasan 2/40 (9 overs)		Tamim Iqbal 80 (58); Mahmudullah 2/29 (5 overs)

BCB Red won by 5 wickets
Bangladesh Krira Shikkha Protisthan No 4 Ground, Savar
Umpires: Shafiuddin Ahmed (Ban) and Mozahiduzzaman (Ban)

- BCB Green won the toss and elected to bat.

21 May 2021
9:30
Scorecard

Sri Lanka Team B 284/5 (40 overs)	v	Sri Lanka Team A 282 (37.2 overs)
Niroshan Dickwella 88* (63); Danushka Gunathilaka 1/26 (5 overs)		Ashen Bandara 80* (79); Chamika Karunaratne 3/40 (6.2 overs)

Sri Lanka Team B won by 2 runs
Bangladesh Krira Shikkha Protisthan No 3 Ground, Savar
Umpires: Shafiuddin Ahmed (Ban) and Ali Arman (Ban)

- Toss uncontested.

== ODI series ==
=== 1st ODI ===
23 May 2021
13:00 (D/N)
Scorecard

Bangladesh; 257/6 (50 overs)	v	Sri Lanka; 224 (48.1 overs)
Mushfiqur Rahim 84 (87); Dhananjaya de Silva 3/45 (10 overs)		Wanindu Hasaranga 74 (60); Mehidy Hasan 4/30 (10 overs)

Bangladesh won by 33 runs
Sher-e-Bangla National Cricket Stadium, Dhaka
Umpires: Masudur Rahman (Ban) and Sharfuddoula (Ban)
Player of the match: Mushfiqur Rahim (Ban)

- Bangladesh won the toss and elected to bat.
- Kusal Perera captained Sri Lanka for the first time in ODIs.
- World Cup Super League points: Bangladesh 10, Sri Lanka 0.

=== 2nd ODI ===
25 May 2021
13:00 (D/N)
Scorecard

Bangladesh; 246 (48.1 overs)	v	Sri Lanka; 141/9 (40 overs)
Mushfiqur Rahim 125 (127); Dushmantha Chameera 3/44 (9.1 overs)		Danushka Gunathilaka 24 (46); Mustafizur Rahman 3/16 (6 overs)

Bangladesh won by 103 runs (DLS method)
Sher-e-Bangla National Cricket Stadium, Dhaka
Umpires: Sharfuddoula (Ban) and Gazi Sohel (Ban)
Player of the match: Mushfiqur Rahim (Ban)

- Bangladesh won the toss and elected to bat.
- Sri Lanka were set a revised target of 245 runs from 40 overs due to rain.
- Shoriful Islam (Ban) made his ODI debut.
- Taskin Ahmed replaced Mohammad Saifuddin as a concussion substitute for Bangladesh.
- World Cup Super League points: Bangladesh 10, Sri Lanka 0.

=== 3rd ODI ===
28 May 2021
13:00 (D/N)
Scorecard

Sri Lanka; 286/6 (50 overs)	v	Bangladesh; 189 (42.3 overs)
Kusal Perera 120 (122); Taskin Ahmed 4/46 (9 overs)		Mahmudullah 53 (63); Dushmantha Chameera 5/16 (9 overs)

Sri Lanka won by 97 runs
Sher-e-Bangla National Cricket Stadium, Dhaka
Umpires: Tanvir Ahmed (Ban) and Sharfuddoula (Ban)
Player of the match: Dushmantha Chameera (SL)

- Sri Lanka won the toss and elected to bat.
- Binura Fernando, Chamika Karunaratne and Ramesh Mendis (SL) all made their ODI debuts.
- Taskin Ahmed (Ban) took his 50th wicket in ODIs.
- Dushmantha Chameera (SL) took his first five-wicket haul in ODIs.
- World Cup Super League points: Sri Lanka 10, Bangladesh 0.
