= Bangladeshi cricket team in India in 2019–20 =

International cricket tour

	India	Bangladesh
- Dates: 3 – 26 November 2019
Captains	Virat Kohli (Tests); Rohit Sharma (T20Is)	Mominul Haque (Tests); Mahmudullah (T20Is)

Test series
- Result: India won the 2-match series 2–0
Most runs	Mayank Agarwal (257)	Mushfiqur Rahim (181)
Most wickets	Ishant Sharma (12); Umesh Yadav (12)	Abu Jayed (6)
- Player of the series: Ishant Sharma (Ind)

Twenty20 International series
- Results: India won the 3-match series 2–1
Most runs	Shreyas Iyer (108)	Mohammad Naim (143)
Most wickets	Deepak Chahar (8)	Aminul Islam (4); Shafiul Islam (4)
- Player of the series: Deepak Chahar (Ind)

The Bangladesh cricket team toured India in November 2019 to play two Test and three Twenty20 International (T20I) matches. The Test series formed part of the inaugural 2019–2021 ICC World Test Championship. It was the second time that Bangladesh toured India to play a Test series, and the first time that Bangladesh played a T20I series against India in India. The Test series also featured the first day/night match to be played by either side.

Bangladesh's captain, Shakib Al Hasan, was initially selected to lead the team on the tour. However, on 29 October 2019, the International Cricket Council (ICC) banned Shakib from all cricket for two years, with one year suspended, after breaching the ICC's Anti-Corruption Code. Following Shakib's ban, Mominul Haque was named as the team's Test captain and Mahmudullah as the T20I captain.

The first match of the tour, the T20I in Delhi, was the 1,000th men's T20I match to be played. Bangladesh won the match by seven wickets, to record their first ever victory against India in the format. India won the next two matches to win the series 2–1. In the third and final match, India's Deepak Chahar took six wickets for seven runs to record what was at that time the best bowling figures in a T20I match.

India won the Test series 2–0, with both matches finishing inside three days. It was India's twelfth-consecutive Test series win at home, the most by any team at home. It was also India's seventh-consecutive win in Tests, a record for the team, and the seventh-consecutive win under Virat Kohli's captaincy, also a record for India. India's winning margin in the second Test of an innings made them the first team to record four consecutive wins in Test cricket by an innings.

== Background ==
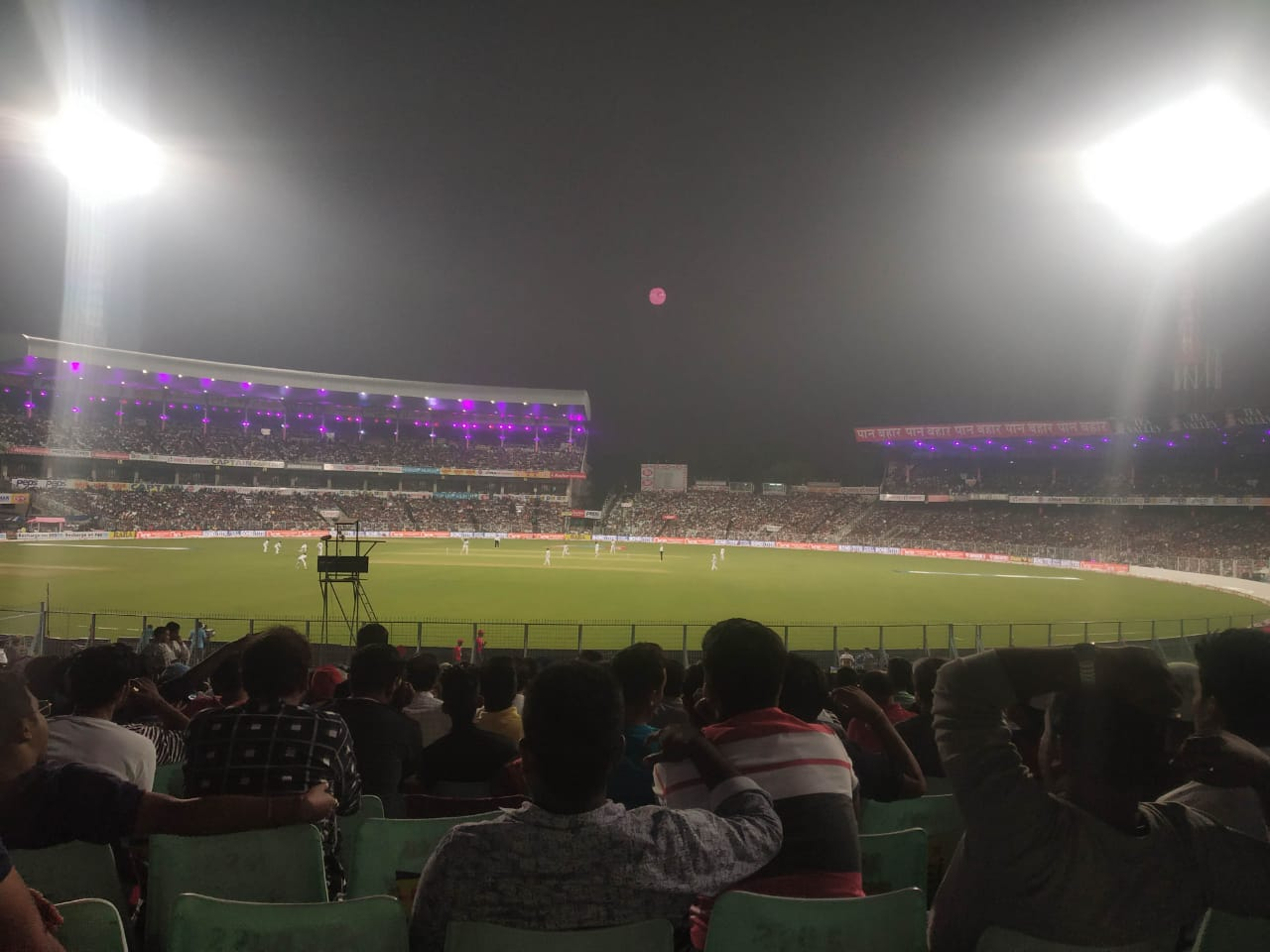
The crowd at Eden Gardens on the first day of the day/night Test match.

In October 2019, several Bangladesh cricketers voiced their concerns to the Bangladesh Cricket Board (BCB) regarding the administration of their domestic cricket, with the possibility of a players' strike. The cricketers had agreed not to take part in any further cricket activity until the issues with the BCB were resolved. In response, the BCB called an emergency meeting with its directors to resolve the situation. Sourav Ganguly, president of the Board of Control for Cricket in India (BCCI) was confident that the tour would go ahead as planned, saying "it's an internal matter, they will sort it out. No, no, they'll come". Two days after announcing the strike, it was called off, following Shakib Al Hasan's meeting with the BCB. The following day, India named their squads for the tour, with Virat Kohli rested for the T20I matches, with Rohit Sharma named as captain in his place.

On 29 October 2019, Shakib Al Hasan was given a two-year ban from cricket by the ICC, with one year suspended, for "failing to report corrupt approaches". The approaches were made during the 2017–18 Bangladesh Tri-Nation Series in January 2018, and the 2018 Indian Premier League. Along with the BCB, Sheikh Hasina, the Prime Minister of Bangladesh, offered her support to Shakib. The BCB said they were "shocked and extremely disappointed", but hoped that he would come back to cricket once the ban ended. As a result, Mominul Haque and Mahmudullah were named as Bangladesh's Test and T20I captains respectively.

Two days before the start of the T20I series, the air quality in Delhi had dropped to hazardous levels, with a public health emergency declared. However, despite the poor air quality, both teams were able to train at the ground. Smog had previously affected the third Test between India and Sri Lanka in December 2017, with several players on both sides falling ill. Sourav Ganguly admitted that the BCCI needed to be a "bit more practical" when scheduling cricket matches in northern India at the end of the year due to the pollution. On the morning of the first T20I match, thirty-two flights were diverted and schools were closed in Delhi, due to the air pollution. India's Ravichandran Ashwin described the conditions in the city as "scary".

Ahead of the start of the tour, the BCCI submitted a request to the BCB for the second Test of the series, at Eden Gardens in Kolkata, to be played as a day/night match. One day after the request was made, the BCB agreed to the day/night Test. It was the first day/night Test played by either team and the first day/night Test to be played in India. The BCCI agreed that the Test match would use the SG pink ball, instead of the Kookaburra ball. India's captain, Virat Kohli, said that the day/night match is "going to be a landmark event for Indian cricket and Indian Test cricket". The Cricket Association of Bengal also made many arrangements to mark the event with the city of Kolkata was decorated with pink lights. Ahead of the start of the match, paratroopers were supposed to hand over the balls to both captains, but the plan was cancelled due to a security reason. The Prime Minister of Bangladesh, Sheikh Hasina, and Chief Minister of West Bengal, Mamata Banerjee, rang the ceremonial bell to inaugurate the match.

== Squads ==
Tests		T20Is	
India	Bangladesh	India	Bangladesh
Virat Kohli (c); Mayank Agarwal; Ravichandran Ashwin; K. S. Bharat (wk); Shubman Gill; Ravindra Jadeja; Rishabh Pant (wk); Cheteshwar Pujara; Ajinkya Rahane; Wriddhiman Saha (wk); Mohammed Shami; Ishant Sharma; Rohit Sharma; Hanuma Vihari; Kuldeep Yadav; Umesh Yadav	Mominul Haque (c); Litton Das (wk); Mehedi Hasan; Nayeem Hasan; Saif Hassan; Al-Amin Hossain; Ebadot Hossain; Mosaddek Hossain; Shadman Islam; Taijul Islam; Abu Jayed; Imrul Kayes; Mahmudullah; Mohammad Mithun; Mustafizur Rahman; Mushfiqur Rahim (wk)	Rohit Sharma (c); Khaleel Ahmed; Yuzvendra Chahal; Deepak Chahar; Rahul Chahar; Shikhar Dhawan; Shivam Dube; Shreyas Iyer; Manish Pandey; Krunal Pandya; Rishabh Pant (wk); KL Rahul; Sanju Samson (wk); Washington Sundar; Shardul Thakur	Mahmudullah (c); Litton Das (wk); Afif Hossain; Al-Amin Hossain; Mosaddek Hossain; Abu Hider; Aminul Islam; Shafiul Islam; Taijul Islam; Mohammad Mithun; Mohammad Naim; Mushfiqur Rahim (wk); Mustafizur Rahman; Soumya Sarkar; Arafat Sunny

Ahead of the tour, Mohammad Saifuddin was ruled out of Bangladesh's T20I squad with a back injury. Bangladesh's Tamim Iqbal opted not to play, due to the birth of his second child, with Imrul Kayes named as his replacement for T20Is. One day before the start of the second Test, Saif Hassan was ruled out of Bangladesh's squad due to a split webbing. Following the close of play on the first day of the second Test, Rishabh Pant was released from India's squad, allowing him to play in the 2019–20 Syed Mushtaq Ali Trophy. K. S. Bharat was also added to India's Test squad, as cover for Wriddhiman Saha.

== T20I series ==
=== 1st T20I ===
3 November 2019
19:00 (N)
Scorecard

India; 148/6 (20 overs)	v	Bangladesh; 154/3 (19.3 overs)
Shikhar Dhawan 41 (42); Aminul Islam 2/22 (3 overs)		Mushfiqur Rahim 60* (43); Deepak Chahar 1/24 (3 overs)

Bangladesh won by 7 wickets
Arun Jaitley Stadium, Delhi
Umpires: Nitin Menon (Ind) and C. K. Nandan (Ind)
Player of the match: Mushfiqur Rahim (Ban)

- Bangladesh won the toss and elected to field.
- Shivam Dube (Ind) and Mohammad Naim (Ban) both made their T20I debuts.
- Rohit Sharma became the most-capped cricketer for India in T20Is, playing in his 99th match.
- This was Bangladesh's first win against India in T20Is.

=== 2nd T20I ===
7 November 2019
19:00 (N)
Scorecard

Bangladesh; 153/6 (20 overs)	v	India; 154/2 (15.4 overs)
Mohammad Naim 36 (31); Yuzvendra Chahal 2/28 (4 overs)		Rohit Sharma 85 (43); Aminul Islam 2/29 (4 overs)

India won by 8 wickets
Saurashtra Cricket Association Stadium, Rajkot
Umpires: Nitin Menon (Ind) and Chettithody Shamshuddin (Ind)
Player of the match: Rohit Sharma (Ind)

- India won the toss and elected to field.
- Rohit Sharma became the first male cricketer for India to play in 100 T20Is, and the second male cricketer to play in 100 T20Is.

=== 3rd T20I ===
10 November 2019
19:00 (N)
Scorecard

India; 174/5 (20 overs)	v	Bangladesh; 144 (19.2 overs)
Shreyas Iyer 62 (33); Soumya Sarkar 2/29 (4 overs)		Mohammad Naim 81 (48); Deepak Chahar 6/7 (3.2 overs)

India won by 30 runs
Vidarbha Cricket Association Stadium, Nagpur
Umpires: Anil Chaudhary (Ind) and C. K. Nandan (Ind)
Player of the match: Deepak Chahar (Ind)

- Bangladesh won the toss and elected to field.
- Yuzvendra Chahal became the third bowler for India to take 50 wickets in T20Is.
- Deepak Chahar (Ind) took the best bowling figures in T20Is.
- Deepak Chahar also took the first hat-trick by a male bowler for India and his first five-wicket haul in T20Is.

== Test series ==
=== 1st Test ===
14–18 November 2019 (Note: While five days of play were scheduled for each Test, both Tests reached a result in three days.)
Scorecard

Bangladesh	v	India
150 (58.3 overs); Mushfiqur Rahim 43 (105); Mohammed Shami 3/27 (13 overs)		493/6d (114 overs); Mayank Agarwal 243 (330); Abu Jayed 4/108 (25 overs)
213 (69.2 overs); Mushfiqur Rahim 64 (150); Mohammed Shami 4/31 (16 overs)

India won by an innings and 130 runs
Holkar Stadium, Indore
Umpires: Marais Erasmus (SA) and Rod Tucker (Aus)
Player of the match: Mayank Agarwal (Ind)

- Bangladesh won the toss and elected to bat.
- Mominul Haque captained Bangladesh for the first time in Tests.
- This was India's tenth win by an innings margin under the captaincy of Virat Kohli, the most by any captain of India.
- World Test Championship points: India 60, Bangladesh 0.

=== 2nd Test ===
22–26 November 2019 (D/N)
Scorecard

Bangladesh	v	India
106 (30.3 overs); Shadman Islam 29 (52); Ishant Sharma 5/22 (12 overs)		347/9d (89.4 overs); Virat Kohli 136 (194); Al-Amin Hossain 3/85 (22.4 overs)
195 (41.1 overs); Mushfiqur Rahim 74 (96); Umesh Yadav 5/53 (14.1 overs)

India won by an innings and 46 runs
Eden Gardens, Kolkata
Umpires: Marais Erasmus (SA) and Joel Wilson (WI)
Player of the match: Ishant Sharma (Ind)

- Bangladesh won the toss and elected to bat.
- This was the first day/night Test match played by either team, and the first day/night Test match in India.
- Wriddhiman Saha became the fifth wicket-keeper for India to effect 100 dismissals in Tests.
- Mehedi Hasan and Taijul Islam replaced Litton Das and Nayeem Hasan respectively as concussion substitutes in Bangladesh's squad.
- This was the first instance that two concussion substitutes were used in the same Test match.
- Ishant Sharma (Ind) took his tenth five-wicket haul in Tests.
- Virat Kohli (Ind) became the fastest captain to score 5,000 runs in Tests, in terms of number of innings (86).
- Virat Kohli also scored his 70th century in international cricket, his 20th as captain in Tests, and equaled Ricky Ponting's record of the most centuries scored as a captain in international cricket (41).
- 19 wickets were taken by India's pace bowlers in the match, the most by them in a home Test, and it was the first home win for India in a Test match with no wickets taken by spin bowling.
- In terms of balls bowled, this was the shortest Test match in India to reach a result (968).
- World Test Championship points: India 60, Bangladesh 0.
