= Zimbabwean cricket team in Bangladesh in 2019–20 =

International cricket tour

	Bangladesh	Zimbabwe
- Dates: 18 February – 11 March 2020
Captains	Mominul Haque (Test); Mashrafe Mortaza (ODIs); Mahmudullah (T20Is)	Craig Ervine (Test); Chamu Chibhabha (ODIs & T20Is) (Note: Sean Williams captained Zimbabwe in the second and third ODIs and the two T20I matches.)

Test series
- Result: Bangladesh won the 1-match series 1–0
Most runs	Mushfiqur Rahim (203)	Craig Ervine (150)
Most wickets	Nayeem Hasan (9)	Ainsley Ndlovu (2)

One Day International series
- Results: Bangladesh won the 3-match series 3–0
Most runs	Litton Das (311)	Sikandar Raza (145)
Most wickets	Mohammad Saifuddin (7)	Carl Mumba (6)
- Player of the series: Tamim Iqbal (Ban) and Litton Das (Ban)

Twenty20 International series
- Results: Bangladesh won the 2-match series 2–0
Most runs	Litton Das (119)	Brendan Taylor (60)
Most wickets	Mustafizur Rahman (5)	Christopher Mpofu (2)
- Player of the series: Litton Das (Ban)

The Zimbabwe cricket team toured Bangladesh in February and March 2020 to play one Test match, three One Day International (ODI) and two Twenty20 International (T20I) matches. On 26 January 2020, the Bangladesh Cricket Board (BCB) confirmed the itinerary for the tour. It was the first time that a tour between the two sides featured a one-off Test match. Zimbabwe last toured Bangladesh in October and November 2018, and last won a series in the country during their tour in November 2001. On 9 February, the BCB moved the three ODI matches from Chittagong to the Sylhet International Cricket Stadium, to give the venue more exposure and international attention. The one-off Test match was the 100th international match to be played between the two sides.

Zimbabwe Cricket announced the squad for the one-off Test, with Craig Ervine named as the team's captain. Sean Williams, Zimbabwe's regular Test captain, took leave ahead of the match for the birth of his first child. Bangladesh won the one-off Test match by an innings and 106 runs.

Ahead of the tour, the BCB announced that it would be Mashrafe Mortaza's last series as captain of the ODI team. Prior to the third ODI, Mortaza confirmed that he would be stepping down as Bangladesh's ODI captain after the series. Bangladesh won the ODI series 3–0, with Mashrafe Mortaza recording his 50th win in an ODI match as captain with victory in the third match. Tamim Iqbal was appointed as the new ODI captain ahead of Bangladesh's next fixture, the one-off match against Pakistan.

In an attempt to mitigate the impact of the COVID-19 pandemic, the BCB restricted ticket sales for the first T20I match to one per person. Bangladesh won the T20I series 2–0, to win all six international fixtures against Zimbabwe in the series. It was the first time that Bangladesh had whitewashed a team in a single series across all three formats of international cricket.

== Squads ==
Test		ODIs		T20Is	
Bangladesh	Zimbabwe	Bangladesh	Zimbabwe	Bangladesh	Zimbabwe
Mominul Haque (c); Taskin Ahmed; Yasir Ali; Litton Das (wk); Mehedi Hasan; Nayeem Hasan; Saif Hassan; Ebadot Hossain; Tamim Iqbal; Taijul Islam; Abu Jayed; Hasan Mahmud; Mohammad Mithun; Mushfiqur Rahim; Mustafizur Rahman; Najmul Hossain Shanto	Craig Ervine (c); Regis Chakabva (wk); Kevin Kasuza; Timycen Maruma; Prince Masvaure; Christopher Mpofu; Brian Mudzinganyama; Carl Mumba; Tinotenda Mutombodzi; Ainsley Ndlovu; Victor Nyauchi; Sikandar Raza; Brendan Taylor; Donald Tiripano; Charlton Tshuma	Mashrafe Mortaza (c); Litton Das; Mehedi Hasan; Afif Hossain; Al-Amin Hossain; Tamim Iqbal; Shafiul Islam; Taijul Islam; Mahmudullah; Mohammad Mithun; Mohammad Naim; Mushfiqur Rahim (wk); Mustafizur Rahman; Mohammad Saifuddin; Soumya Sarkar; Najmul Hossain Shanto	Chamu Chibhabha (c); Regis Chakabva (wk); Craig Ervine; Tinashe Kamunhukamwe; Wesley Madhevere; Timycen Maruma; Christopher Mpofu; Carl Mumba; Tinotenda Mutombodzi; Richmond Mutumbami (wk); Ainsley Ndlovu; Sikandar Raza; Brendan Taylor; Donald Tiripano; Charlton Tshuma; Sean Williams	Mahmudullah (c); Nasum Ahmed; Litton Das; Mahedi Hasan; Afif Hossain; Al-Amin Hossain; Tamim Iqbal; Aminul Islam; Shafiul Islam; Hasan Mahmud; Mohammad Naim; Mushfiqur Rahim (wk); Mustafizur Rahman; Mohammad Saifuddin; Soumya Sarkar	Chamu Chibhabha (c); Craig Ervine; Tinashe Kamunhukamwe; Wesley Madhevere; Timycen Maruma; Christopher Mpofu; Carl Mumba; Tinotenda Mutombodzi; Richmond Mutumbami (wk); Ainsley Ndlovu; Sikandar Raza; Brendan Taylor; Donald Tiripano; Charlton Tshuma; Sean Williams

Soumya Sarkar was added to Bangladesh's squad for the third ODI.

== Tour match ==
=== Two-day match: Bangladesh Cricket Board XI vs Zimbabwe ===
18–19 February 2020
Scorecard

Zimbabwe	v	Bangladesh Cricket Board XI
291/7d (90 overs); Kevin Kasuza 70 (130); Shahadat Hossain 3/16 (8 overs)		288/5 (59.3 overs); Tanzid Hasan 125* (99); Ainsley Ndlovu 2/51 (11 overs)

Match drawn
Bangladesh Krira Shikkha Protisthan No 3 Ground, Savar
Umpires: Morshed Ali Khan (Ban) and Masudur Rahman (Ban)

- Zimbabwe won the toss and elected to bat.

== Only Test ==
22–26 February 2020 (Note: While five days of play were scheduled for the one-off Test, the match reached a result in four days.)
Scorecard

Zimbabwe	v	Bangladesh
265 (106.3 overs); Craig Ervine 107 (227); Nayeem Hasan 4/70 (38 overs)		560/6d (150 overs); Mushfiqur Rahim 203* (318); Ainsley Ndlovu 2/170 (42 overs)
189 (57.3 overs); Craig Ervine 43 (49); Nayeem Hasan 5/82 (24 overs)

Bangladesh won by an innings and 106 runs
Sher-e-Bangla National Cricket Stadium, Dhaka
Umpires: Paul Reiffel (Aus) and Joel Wilson (WI)
Player of the match: Mushfiqur Rahim (Ban)

- Zimbabwe won the toss and elected to bat.
- Charlton Tshuma (Zim) made his Test debut.
- Craig Ervine captained Zimbabwe for the first time in Tests.
- Mushfiqur Rahim became the first batsman for Bangladesh to score three double centuries in Tests.

== ODI series ==
=== 1st ODI ===
1 March 2020
13:00 (D/N)
Scorecard

Bangladesh; 321/6 (50 overs)	v	Zimbabwe; 152 (39.1 overs)
Litton Das 126* (105); Christopher Mpofu 2/68 (10 overs)		Wesley Madhevere 35 (44); Mohammad Saifuddin 3/22 (7 overs)

Bangladesh won by 169 runs
Sylhet International Cricket Stadium, Sylhet
Umpires: Kumar Dharmasena (SL) and Masudur Rahman (Ban)
Player of the match: Litton Das (Ban)

- Bangladesh won the toss and elected to bat.
- Wesley Madhevere (Zim) made his ODI debut.
- Chamu Chibhabha captained Zimbabwe for the first time in ODIs.
- Mahmudullah (Ban) scored his 4,000th run in ODIs.
- Mashrafe Mortaza (Ban) took his 100th wicket as captain in ODIs, and his 700th wicket of his career.
- In terms of runs, this was Bangladesh's biggest winning margin in ODIs.

=== 2nd ODI ===
3 March 2020
13:00 (D/N)
Scorecard

Bangladesh; 322/8 (50 overs)	v	Zimbabwe; 318/8 (50 overs)
Tamim Iqbal 158 (136); Donald Tiripano 2/55 (8 overs)		Sikandar Raza 66 (57); Taijul Islam 3/52 (10 overs)

Bangladesh won by 4 runs
Sylhet International Cricket Stadium, Sylhet
Umpires: Masudur Rahman (Ban) and Paul Reiffel (Aus)
Player of the match: Tamim Iqbal (Ban)

- Bangladesh won the toss and elected to bat.
- Charlton Tshuma (Zim) made his ODI debut.
- Tamim Iqbal became the first batsman for Bangladesh to score 7,000 runs in ODIs, and also made the highest individual score for a batsman for Bangladesh in ODIs.

=== 3rd ODI ===
6 March 2020
14:00 (D/N)
Scorecard

Bangladesh; 322/3 (43 overs)	v	Zimbabwe; 218 (37.3 overs)
Litton Das 176 (143); Carl Mumba 3/69 (8 overs)		Sikandar Raza 61 (50); Mohammad Saifuddin 4/41 (6.3 overs)

Bangladesh won by 123 runs (DLS method)
Sylhet International Cricket Stadium, Sylhet
Umpires: Kumar Dharmasena (SL) and Sharfuddoula (Ban)
Player of the match: Litton Das (Ban)

- Zimbabwe won the toss and elected to field.
- Zimbabwe were set a revised target of 342 runs from 43 overs.
- Afif Hossain and Mohammad Naim (Ban) both made their ODI debuts.
- Sikandar Raza (Zim) played in his 100th ODI.
- Litton Das (Ban) scored his 1,000th run in ODIs, and also made the highest individual score for a batsman for Bangladesh in ODIs.
- Litton Das and Tamim Iqbal made the highest partnership for Bangladesh for any wicket in ODIs (292 runs).

== T20I series ==
=== 1st T20I ===
9 March 2020
18:00 (D/N)
Scorecard

Bangladesh; 200/3 (20 overs)	v	Zimbabwe; 152 (19 overs)
Soumya Sarkar 62* (32); Wesley Madhevere 1/15 (2 overs)		Tinashe Kamunhukamwe 28 (20); Mustafizur Rahman 3/32 (4 overs)

Bangladesh won by 48 runs
Sher-e-Bangla National Cricket Stadium, Dhaka
Umpires: Tanvir Ahmed (Ban) and Sharfuddoula (Ban)
Player of the match: Soumya Sarkar (Ban)

- Zimbabwe won the toss and elected to field.
- Tinashe Kamunhukamwe, Wesley Madhevere and Carl Mumba (Zim) all made their T20I debuts.
- Tamim Iqbal and Litton Das made the highest opening partnership for Bangladesh in T20Is (92 runs) on that match.(Currently broken)

=== 2nd T20I ===
11 March 2020
18:00 (D/N)
Scorecard

Zimbabwe; 119/7 (20 overs)	v	Bangladesh; 120/1 (15.5 overs)
Brendan Taylor 59* (48); Al-Amin Hossain 2/22 (4 overs)		Litton Das 60* (45); Christopher Mpofu 1/27 (3.5 overs)

Bangladesh won by 9 wickets
Sher-e-Bangla National Cricket Stadium, Dhaka
Umpires: Masudur Rahman (Ban) and Gazi Sohel (Ban)
Player of the match: Litton Das (Ban)

- Bangladesh won the toss and elected to field.
- Hasan Mahmud (Ban) and Charlton Tshuma (Zim) both made their T20I debuts.
