= Bangladeshi cricket team in England in 2010 =

Bangladesh cricket team in England in 2010
	Bangladesh	England
- Dates: 27 May 2010 – 12 July 2010
Captains	Shakib Al Hasan	Andrew Strauss

Test series
- Result: England won the 2-match series 2–0
Most runs	Tamim Iqbal (268)	Jonathan Trott (265)
Most wickets	Shakib Al Hasan (8)	Steven Finn (15)
- Player of the series: Tamim Iqbal (Ban); Steven Finn (Eng)

One Day International series
- Results: England won the 3-match series 2–1
Most runs	Junaid Siddique (97)	Andrew Strauss (237)
Most wickets	Mashrafe Mortaza (5)	Ajmal Shahzad (5)
- Player of the series: Andrew Strauss (Eng)

The Bangladesh national cricket team toured England, playing three One Day Internationals and two Test matches between 27 May and 12 July 2010.

== Tour matches ==
=== First-class: Surrey vs Bangladeshis ===
9–11 May
Scorecard

Surrey	v	Bangladeshis
318/7d (82.2 overs); Matthew Spriegel 108* (198); Robiul Islam 3/67 (14 overs)		372/6d (102.5 overs); Jahurul Islam 158 (256); Matt Dunn 3/48 (14.5 overs)
313/3d (72.2 overs); Usman Afzaal 159* (165); Mahbubul Alam 1/38 (12 overs)

Match drawn
The Oval, London
Umpires: Mark Benson & Ismail Dawood

- Surrey won the toss and elected to bat.

=== First-class: Bangladeshis vs Essex ===
14–16 May
Scorecard

Bangladeshis	v	Essex
231 (60.4 overs); Mohammad Ashraful 58 (57); Maurice Chambers 4/32 (15.4 overs)		313 (87.1 overs); John Maunders 126 (188); Shahadat Hossain 4/72 (21.1 overs)
211 (45.2 overs); Mohammad Ashraful 61 (63); Max Osborne 3/35 (6 overs)		130/5 (43.2 overs); Grant Flower 34* (55); Robiul Islam 2/33 (11 overs)

Essex won by 5 wickets
County Ground, Chelmsford
Umpires: Paul Baldwin (Ger) & Richard Kettleborough

- Essex won the toss and elected to field.

=== First-class: Bangladeshis vs England Lions ===
19–22 May
Scorecard

Bangladeshis	v	England Lions
220 (57.2 overs); Imrul Kayes 42 (108); Ravi Bopara 3/9 (3.2 overs)		296 (77.4 overs); Steve Davies 81 (112); Robiul Islam 3/72 (18 overs)
161 (52.5 overs); Jahurul Islam 58* (197); Ravi Bopara 4/14 (6.5 overs)		86/1 (16.4 overs); Alastair Cook 42* (55); Abdur Razzak 1/17 (3.4 overs)

England Lions won by 9 wickets
County Ground, Derby
Umpires: Rob Bailey and Tim Robinson

- England Lions won the toss and elected to field

=== List A: Sussex vs Bangladeshis ===
3 July 2010
Scorecard

Sussex; 253 (47.5 overs)	v	Bangladeshis; 104 (28.4 overs)
Ben Brown 58 (52); Mashrafe Mortaza 2/32 (9 overs)		Raqibul Hasan 23 (45); Monty Panesar 3/21 (7.4 overs)

Sussex won by 149 runs
County Cricket Ground, Hove
Umpires: Mark Eggleston and Ian Gould

- Sussex won the toss and elected to bat.

=== List A: Middlesex vs Bangladeshis ===
5 July 2010
Scorecard

Bangladeshis; 301/7 (50 overs)	v	Middlesex; 160 (39.3 overs)
Jahurul Islam 88 (93); Danny Evans 3/51 (10 overs)		Owais Shah 61 (72); Shafiul Islam 3/31 (9 overs)

Bangladeshis won by 141 runs
Lord's, London
Umpires: Nigel Llong and Steve O'Shaughnessy

- Bangladeshis won the toss and elected to bat.

== Test series ==
=== 1st Test ===
27–31 May
Scorecard

England	v	Bangladesh
505 (125 overs); Jonathan Trott 226 (349); Shahadat Hossain 5/98 (28 overs)		282 (93 overs); Junaid Siddique 58 (113); James Anderson 4/78 (31 overs)
163/2 (35.1 overs); Andrew Strauss 82 (88); Shakib Al Hasan 1/48 (16 overs)		382 (f/o) (110.2 overs); Tamim Iqbal 103 (100); Steven Finn 5/87 (24 overs)

England won by 8 wickets
Lord's, London
Umpires: Billy Bowden (NZ) and Asoka de Silva (SL)
Player of the match: Steven Finn (Eng)

- Bangladesh won the toss and elected to field.
- Rain and bad light reduced play on Day 2 to 28.5 overs.
- Eoin Morgan (England) and Robiul Islam (Bangladesh) made their Test debuts.
- Tamim Iqbal became the first Bangladesh batsman to grab a place on the Lord’s Honours Boards.

=== 2nd Test ===
4–8 June
Scorecard

England	v	Bangladesh
419 (121.3 overs); Ian Bell 128 (255); Shakib Al Hasan 5/121 (37.3 overs)		216 (54.1 overs); Tamim Iqbal 108 (114); Graeme Swann 5/76 (22.1 overs)
		123 (f/o) (34.1 overs); Mahmudullah 38 (52); Steven Finn 5/42 (10 overs)

England won by an innings and 80 runs
Old Trafford, Manchester
Umpires: Billy Bowden (NZ) and Asoka de Silva (SL)
Player of the match: Ian Bell (Eng)

- England won the toss and elected to bat.
- Rain delayed the start of play on Day 3 until 13:15.
- Ajmal Shahzad (England) made his Test debut.

== ODI series ==
=== 1st ODI ===
8 July 2010
Scorecard

Bangladesh; 250/9 (50 overs)	v	England; 251/4 (45.1 overs)
Raqibul Hasan 76 (95); James Anderson 3/74 (10 overs)		Ian Bell 84* (101); Shakib Al Hasan 2/35 (10 overs)

England won by 6 wickets
Trent Bridge, Nottingham
Umpires: Asad Rauf (Pak) and Nigel Llong (Eng)
Player of the match: Ian Bell (Eng)

- Bangladesh won the toss and elected to bat.

=== 2nd ODI ===
10 July 2010
Scorecard

Bangladesh; 236/7 (50 overs)	v	England; 231 (49.3 overs)
Imrul Kayes 76 (111); Ajmal Shahzad 3/41 (10 overs)		Jonathan Trott 94 (130); Shafiul Islam 2/38 (9.3 overs)

Bangladesh won by 5 runs
County Ground, Bristol
Umpires: Asad Rauf (Pak) and Richard Illingworth (Eng)
Player of the match: Mashrafe Mortaza (Ban)

- England won the toss and elected to field.
- Bangladesh won for the first time against England in any format.

=== 3rd ODI ===
12 July 2010
Scorecard

England; 347/7 (50 overs)	v	Bangladesh; 203 (45 overs)
Andrew Strauss 154 (140); Mashrafe Mortaza 3/31 (10 overs)		Mahmudullah 42 (81); Ravi Bopara 4/38 (10 overs)

England won by 144 runs
Edgbaston, Birmingham
Umpires: Asad Rauf (Pak) and Richard Kettleborough (Eng)
Player of the match: Andrew Strauss (Eng)

- Bangladesh won the toss and elected to field.
