= Max Osborne =

English cricketer

Personal information
- Full name: Max Osborne
- Born: 21 November 1990 (age 35); Orsett, Essex, England
- Batting: Right-handed
- Bowling: Right-arm medium-fast

Domestic team information
- Years: Team
- 2010–2011: Essex
- 2011: Suffolk

Career statistics
Competition	First-class
Matches	2
Runs scored	5
Batting average	5.00
100s/50s	–/–
Top score	5
Balls bowled	216
Wickets	6
Bowling average	25.16
5 wickets in innings	–
10 wickets in match	–
Best bowling	3/35
Catches/stumpings	–/–
- Source: Cricinfo, 27 September 2011

Max Osborne (born 21 November 1990) is an English cricketer. Osborne is a right-handed batsman who bowls right-arm medium-fast. He was born at Orsett, Essex.

Osborne made his first-class debut for Essex against the touring Bangladeshis in 2010. He took the wickets of Mohammed Ashraful and Naeem Islam in the Bangladeshis first-innings for the cost of 60 runs from 14 overs. In their second-innings he took the wickets of Junaid Siddique, Mushfiqur Rahim and Mahmudullah for the cost of 35 runs from 6 overs. He made a second first-class appearance in 2010, which came against Durham in the County Championship. His only wicket in this match was that of Gordon Muchall.

He did not appear for Essex in the 2011 season, but did play three MCCA Knockout Trophy matches for Suffolk against Berkshire, Lincolnshire and Norfolk in that season. He was released by Essex following the 2011 season.
