= List of Bangladesh Test wicket-keepers =

This is a chronological list of Bangladeshi wicket-keepers, that is, Test cricketers who have kept wicket in a match for Bangladesh.

This list only includes players who have played as the designated keeper for a match. On occasions, another player may have stepped in to relieve the primary wicket-keeper due to injury or the keeper bowling. Figures do not include catches made when the player was a non wicket-keeper.

No.	Player	Span	Tests	Catches	Stumpings	Total dismissals
1	Khaled Mashud	2000–2007	44	78	9	87
2	Mehrab Hossain	2001	1	1	0	1
3	Mohammad Salim	2003	2	3	1	4
5	Mushfiqur Rahim	2007–2019	55	98	15	113
6	Liton Das	2015–present	37	94	14	108
7	Nurul Hasan Sohan	2017–present	10	25	9	34
8	Mahidul Islam Ankon	2024–present	1	1	0	1
9	Jaker Ali	2025–present	2	8	1	9

== See also ==
- List of Bangladeshi Test cricketers
