= Charlton Tshuma =

Zimbabwean cricketer (born 1993)

Personal information
- Full name: Charlton Kirsh Tshuma
- Born: 19 April 1993 (age 33); Bulawayo, Matabeleland, Zimbabwe
- Batting: Right-handed
- Bowling: Right-arm fast-medium
- Role: Bowler

International information
- National side: Zimbabwe
- Only Test (cap 113): 22 February 2020 v Bangladesh
- ODI debut (cap 142): 3 March 2020 v Bangladesh
- Last ODI: 6 March 2020 v Bangladesh
- Only T20I (cap 61): 11 March 2020 v Bangladesh
- Source: Cricinfo, 11 March 2020

Charlton Tshuma (born 19 April 1993) is a Zimbabwean cricketer. He made his List A debut for Matabeleland Tuskers in the 2018–19 Pro50 Championship on 23 February 2019. He made his Twenty20 debut for Matabeleland Tuskers in the 2018–19 Stanbic Bank 20 Series on 14 March 2019.

In January 2020, he was named in Zimbabwe's Test squad for their series against Sri Lanka, but he did not play. The following month, he was again named in Zimbabwe's Test squad, this time for their one-off Test against Bangladesh. He made his Test debut for Zimbabwe, against Bangladesh, on 22 February 2020. He was also named in Zimbabwe's One Day International (ODI) and Twenty20 International (T20I) squads for the matches against Bangladesh. He made his ODI debut for Zimbabwe, against Bangladesh, on 3 March 2020. He made his T20I debut for Zimbabwe, also against Bangladesh, on 11 March 2020.

In December 2020, he was selected to play for the Tuskers in the 2020–21 Logan Cup.
