= Saif Hassan =

Bangladeshi cricketer (born 1998)

Personal information
- Full name: Mohammad Saif Hassan
- Born: 30 October 1998 (age 28); Riyadh, Saudi Arabia
- Height: 182 cm (6 ft 0 in)
- Batting: Right-handed
- Bowling: Right arm off break
- Role: Batting All-rounder

International information
- National side: Bangladesh (2020–present)
- Test debut (cap 96): 7 February 2020 v Pakistan
- Last Test: 26 November 2021 v Pakistan
- ODI debut (cap 153): 8 October 2025 v Afghanistan
- Last ODI: 9 June 2026 v Australia
- T20I debut (cap 72): 19 November 2021 v Pakistan
- Last T20I: 19 June 2026 v Australia

Domestic team information
- Years: Team
- 2015: Barisal Division
- 2016-present: Dhaka Division
- 2019: Khulna Tigers
- 2021, 2023: Fortune Barishal
- 2024: Durdanto Dhaka
- 2024-2025: Rangpur Riders
- 2026: Dhaka Capitals

Career statistics
Competition	Test	T20I	FC	LA
Matches	6	25	69	171
Runs scored	159	538	3,936	5,961
Batting average	14.45	25.61	38.97	37.72
100s/50s	0/0	0/4	8/17	10/39
Top score	34	69	220*	148*
Balls bowled	36	109	1,868	2,999
Wickets	1	2	28	77
Bowling average	27.00	64.50	30.60	28.89
5 wickets in innings	0	0	0	0
10 wickets in match	0	0	0	0
Best bowling	1/22	2/18	3/15	4/37
Catches/stumpings	0/–	13/–	38/–	74/–
Medal record
Men's cricket
Representing Bangladesh
Asian Games
Bronze medal – third place	2022 Hangzhou	Team
South Asian Games
Gold medal – first place	2019 Kathmandu/Pokhara	Team
- Source: Cricinfo, 20 June 2026

Mohammad Saif Hassan (Bengali: মোহাম্মদ সাইফ হাসান; born 30 October 1998) is a Bangladeshi cricketer. He plays primarily as a right-handed top-order batter and occasional off-spin bowler, representing Bangladesh in the Test, ODI, and T20I formats since 2020. His versatility at the top of the order has made him a recurring selection in Bangladesh's multi-format squads. He made his international debut during the Bangladesh national team's tour of Pakistan in February 2020.

== Early life ==
Saif Hassan was born in Riyadh, Saudi Arabia. Hassan's father is Bangladeshi and his mother's family is from Sri Lanka.

== Domestic career ==
In January 2017 in the 2016–17 National Cricket League, he became the youngest player in Bangladesh to score a first-class double century when he made 204 for Dhaka Division.

He made his Twenty20 debut for Prime Doleshwar Sporting Club in the 2018–19 Dhaka Premier Division Twenty20 Cricket League on 25 February 2019. He was the leading run-scorer in the 2018–19 Dhaka Premier Division Cricket League tournament, with 814 runs in 16 matches. In August 2019, he was one of 35 cricketers named in a training camp ahead of Bangladesh's 2019–20 cricket season.

In November 2019, he was selected to play for the Khulna Tigers in the 2019–20 Bangladesh Premier League.

Across his first-class career, Hassan has accumulated more than 3,900 runs at an average close to 39, including multiple centuries and a double century for Dhaka Division, underscoring his long-term consistency in Bangladesh's domestic competitions. His performances in the National Cricket League and Bangladesh Cricket League have frequently placed him among the top run-scorers in domestic tournaments.

== International career ==
In December 2015 he was named in Bangladesh's squad for the 2016 Under-19 Cricket World Cup. He was the captain of the Bangladesh U-19 side for the 2016 Asia Cup.

In December 2017, he was named as the captain of Bangladesh's squad for the 2018 Under-19 Cricket World Cup. In December 2018, he was named in Bangladesh's team for the 2018 ACC Emerging Teams Asia Cup.

In October 2019, he was named in Bangladesh's Test squad for the series against India. He did not play in the first Test, and on the eve of the second Test, he was ruled out of the match with a split webbing. In November 2019, he was named in Bangladesh's squad for the cricket tournament at the 2019 South Asian Games. The Bangladesh team won the gold medal, after beating Sri Lanka by seven wickets in the final.

In February 2020, he was named in Bangladesh's squad for the first Test match against Pakistan. He made his Test debut for Bangladesh, against Pakistan, on 7 February 2020. On 8 September 2020, BCB confirmed that Saif along with a staff member had tested positive for COVID-19 just prior to the training camp as a warm up for the test series against Sri Lanka which was scheduled to be held in October 2020. He was immediately asked to self isolated by the BCB and was left out of Bangladesh's preliminary squad for the test series against Sri Lanka. A week later, he tested positive for COVID-19 for the second time in his second COVID-19 test.

In February 2021, he was selected in the Bangladesh Emerging squad for their home series against the Ireland Wolves. He was one of the leading run-scorers in the unofficial ODI series, with 190 runs in 5 matches, which included a ton. In April 2021, he was named in Bangladesh's preliminary Test squad for their series against Sri Lanka.

In November 2021, he was named in Bangladesh's Twenty20 International (T20I) squad for their series against Pakistan. He made his T20I debut on 19 November 2021, for Bangladesh against Pakistan.

He was named captain for Asian Games 2023 squad. On 4 October 2023, he made his captaincy debut against Malaysia.

On 22 August 2025, he was named in the Bangladesh Squad for Asia Cup 2025 & T20I Series Against the Netherlands. His selection for the tournament came during a period of squad restructuring, with team management opting for a younger batting order and excluding senior all-rounder Mehidy Hasan Miraz as part of their Asia Cup strategy. The changes were part of Bangladesh's effort to rebuild a more agile limited-overs lineup ahead of future ICC events. In 2025 Asia Cup, Saif was the leading run scorer for Bangladesh, scoring 178 runs in 4 innings with an average of 44.50 and at the strike rate of 128.05 including 2 fifties.

On 23 October 2025, Hassan scored 80 runs off 72 balls — his maiden One Day International (ODI) fifty — during Bangladesh's 179-run victory over the West Indies in the third ODI at Dhaka. His innings provided Bangladesh with a strong start during the powerplay, allowing the middle order to integrate and post a dominant total. The victory also ended Bangladesh's run of four consecutive ODI series defeats, with Hassan's innings highlighted by authoritative strokeplay against both pace and spin. Analysts noted that his controlled shot selection throughout the innings reflected the technical progress he had made over the previous two seasons.
