= Danny Evans (cricketer) =

English cricketer (born 1987)

Personal information
- Full name: Daniel Evans
- Born: 24 July 1987 (age 39); Hartlepool, County Durham, England
- Height: 6 ft 5 in (1.96 m)
- Batting: Right-handed
- Bowling: Right-arm medium-fast
- Role: Bowler

Domestic team information
- Years: Team
- 2007–2010: Middlesex
- FC debut: 22 August 2007 Middlesex v Gloucestershire
- Last FC: 4 June 2010 Middlesex v Northamptonshire
- LA debut: 20 April 2008 Middlesex v Surrey
- Last LA: 5 July 2010 Middlesex v Bangladeshis

Career statistics
Competition	FC	LA	T20
Matches	19	7	4
Runs scored	75	1	6
Batting average	4.41	1.00	6.00
100s/50s	0/0	0/0	0/0
Top score	19*	1*	5*
Balls bowled	2,637	388	60
Wickets	49	12	0
Bowling average	34.89	28.50	–
5 wickets in innings	3	0	–
10 wickets in match	0	0	–
Best bowling	6/35	3/36	–
Catches/stumpings	4/–	0/–	1/–
- Source: ESPNcricinfo, 22 April 2017

Daniel Evans (born 24 July 1987) is a former English first-class cricketer.

Evans is a right-handed batsman and a right-arm medium-fast bowler who has represented Middlesex since 2007. A graduate of the Durham cricket Academy who represented the England Under-19 XI in 2006.

He has taken 32 wickets in thirteen first-class matches with a personal best of six wickets for 35 runs.
