= Hasan Mahmud (cricketer) =

Bangladeshi cricketer

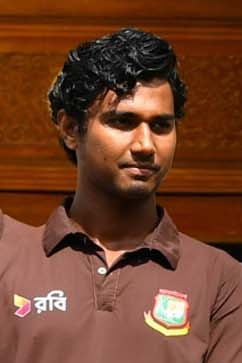
- Mahmud in 2024

Personal information
- Born: 12 October 1999 (age 27); Lakshmipur, Chattogram, Bangladesh
- Batting: Right-handed
- Bowling: Right-arm fast-medium
- Role: Bowler

International information
- National side: Bangladesh (2020–present)
- Test debut (cap 104): 30 March 2024 v Sri Lanka
- Last Test: 22 August 2026 v Australia
- ODI debut (cap 134): 20 January 2021 v West Indies
- Last ODI: 14 October 2025 v Afghanistan
- ODI shirt no.: 91
- T20I debut (cap 68): 11 March 2020 v Zimbabwe
- Last T20I: 1 June 2025 v Pakistan
- T20I shirt no.: 91

Career statistics
Competition	Test	ODI	T20I	FC
Matches	16	26	26	41
Runs scored	199	63	50	412
Batting average	11.70	4.84	25.00	12.11
100s/50s	0/0	0/0	0/0	0/0
Top score	38*	15	26*	38*
Balls bowled	2,306	1,131	534	6,363
Wickets	45	33	28	130
Bowling average	30.46	35.00	24.75	27.10
5 wickets in innings	3	1	0	5
10 wickets in match	0	0	0	0
Best bowling	6/55	5/32	3/33	6/55
Catches/stumpings	8/-	2/–	8/–	13/–
Medal record
Men's Cricket
Representing Bangladesh
South Asian Games
Gold medal – first place	2019 Kathmandu/Pokhara	Team
- Source: ESPNcricinfo, 15 September 2026

Hasan Mahmud (Bengali: হাসান মাহমুদ; born 12 October 1999) is a Bangladeshi cricket right-arm fast-medium bowler. He has represented the Bangladesh national team since 2020, and Chittagong Division since 2017. As of 2026, Mahmud is signed with Noakhali Express in the Bangladesh Premier League (BPL) and Kent in English county cricket.

== Domestic and franchise career ==
He made his first-class debut for Chittagong Division in the 2017–18 National Cricket League on 13 October 2017. He made his List A debut for Khelaghar Samaj Kallyan Samity in the 2017–18 Dhaka Premier Division Cricket League on 5 February 2018.

In November 2019, he was selected to play for the Dhaka Platoon in the 2019–20 Bangladesh Premier League. He made his Twenty20 debut for Dhaka Platoon in the 2019–20 Bengal Premier League on 12 December 2019.

In June 2026, Mahmud signed with Kent to play six matches in Division Two of the 2026 County Championship.

== International career ==
In December 2017, he was named in Bangladesh's squad for the 2018 Under-19 Cricket World Cup.

In November 2019, he was named in Bangladesh's squad for the 2019 ACC Emerging Teams Asia Cup in Bangladesh. Later the same month he was named in Bangladesh's squad for the men's cricket tournament at the 2019 South Asian Games. The Bangladesh team won the gold medal, after beating Sri Lanka by seven wickets in the final.

In January 2020, he was named in Bangladesh's Twenty20 International (T20I) squad for their series against Pakistan. The following month, he was named in Bangladesh's Test squad for their one-off match against Zimbabwe. In March 2020, he was named in Bangladesh's T20I squad for their series against Zimbabwe. He made his T20I debut against Zimbabwe, on 11 March 2020.

In January 2021, he was named in Bangladesh's One Day International (ODI) squad for their series against the West Indies. He made his ODI debut against the West Indies, on 20 January 2021. Later the same month, he was named in Bangladesh's Test squad, also for their series against the West Indies.

In March 2023, he was named in Bangladesh's ODI squad for their home series against Ireland. During the third ODI, on 23 March 2023, he took his maiden five-wicket haul in international cricket.

In March 2024, he was named in Bangladesh's Test squad for their series against Sri Lanka. He made his Test debut for Bangladesh on 30 March 2024, against Sri Lanka. In May 2024, he was named as a reserve player in Bangladesh's squad for the 2024 ICC Men's T20 World Cup tournament. In August 2024, he was named in Bangladesh's squad for the Test series against Pakistan.

In July 2026, Mahmud was named to Bangladesh's test squad for the 2 match series against Australia. During the 1st innings of the 1st test match, Mahmud took 6/55, registering the best figures of his test cricket career. Mahmud ended with a total match haul of 9/111, his best figures for a whole Test. He won player of the match, as Bangladesh completed a historic 9 wicket win against the hosts. On 11 October 2026, he took a hat-trick aginst Afghanistan in Tests, thus becoming first Bangladeshi pacer to achieve this feat.
