= Mohammad Naim =

Bangladeshi cricketer (born 1999)

Naim Sheikh
Personal information
- Full name: Mohammad Naim Sheikh
- Born: 22 August 1999 (age 27); Faridpur, Bangladesh
- Height: 6 ft 1 in (185 cm)
- Batting: Left-handed
- Role: Opening Batter

International information
- National side: Bangladesh (2019–present)
- Only Test (cap 100): 9 January 2022 v New Zealand
- ODI debut (cap 134): 6 March 2020 v Zimbabwe
- Last ODI: 14 October 2025 v Afghanistan
- T20I debut (cap 67): 3 November 2019 v India
- Last T20I: 24 July 2025 v Pakistan

Domestic team information
- Years: Team
- 2018-2025: Dhaka Metropolis
- 2025-present: Mymensingh Division
- 2019: Dhaka Dynamites
- 2019/20: Rangpur Rangers
- 2022: Minister Dhaka
- 2023: Rangpur Riders
- 2024: Durdanto Dhaka
- 2025: Khulna Tigers
- 2026: Chattogram Royals

Career statistics
Competition	Test	ODI	T20I	FC
Matches	1	9	38	39
Runs scored	24	102	860	2,224
Batting average	12.00	12.75	23.88	33.69
100s/50s	0/0	0/0	0/4	4/11
Top score	24	28	81	180
Catches/stumpings	1/–	4/–	19/–	39/–
Medal record
Men's Cricket
Representing Bangladesh
South Asian Games
Gold medal – first place	2019 Kathmandu/Pokhara	Team
- Source: ESPNcricinfo, 11 December 2025

Mohammad Naim Sheikh (born 22 August 1999) is a Bangladeshi cricketer. He made his international debut for the Bangladesh cricket team in November 2019.

== Domestic career ==
Naim made his List A debut for Legends of Rupganj in the 2017–18 Dhaka Premier Division Cricket League on 22 February 2018. Prior to his List A debut, he was part of Bangladesh's squad for the 2018 Under-19 Cricket World Cup.

Naim made his first-class debut for Dhaka Metropolis in the 2018–19 National Cricket League on 15 October 2018.

Naim was the leading run-scorer for Legends of Rupganj in the 2018–19 Dhaka Premier Division Cricket League tournament, with 807 runs in 16 matches. In August 2019, he was one of 35 cricketers named in a training camp ahead of Bangladesh's 2019–20 season.

=== Bangladesh Premier League ===
==== Dhaka Dynamites ====
In October 2018, he was named in the Dhaka Dynamites team, following the draft for the 2018–19 Bangladesh Premier League. He made his Twenty20 debut for the Dhaka Dynamites in the 2018–19 Bangladesh Premier League on 12 January 2019. In his debut season he scored only 62 runs on an average of 31.00 with the strike rate of 93.93 and the best of 25*.

==== Rangpur Rangers ====
In November 2019, he was selected to play for the Rangpur Rangers in the 2019–20 Bangladesh Premier League. He finished the season with 359 runs in an average of 32.63 including 2 fifties.

==== Minister Dhaka ====
In December 2021, he was selected to play for the Minister Dhaka in the 2021–22 Bangladesh Premier League. He had a poor tournament personally, where he scored only 50 runs in 7 innings with an average of 8.33.

==== Rangpur Rangers ====
He was again drafted in the squad of Rangpur Rangers for the 2022–23 Bangladesh Premier League. He scored 217 runs in an average of 16.69 with the best of 45.

==== Durdanto Dhaka ====
In 2024 Bangladesh Premier League he played for Durdanto Dhaka, where he scored 310 runs in 12 innings with an average of 25.83 including 2 fifties.

==== Khulna Tigers ====
He was drafted in the squad of Khulna Tigers for the 2025 Bangladesh Premier League. During a league stage against Rangpur Riders he scored his maiden BPL century. He scored 111* off 62 deliveries, hitting 8 sixes and 7 fours. He finished tournament as the highest run scorer. He scored 511 runs in 14 innings at an average of 42.58 including 1 century and 3 fifties. He also became the second Bangladeshi cricketer after Najmul Hossain Shanto to score 500 or more runs in a single season of Bangladesh Premier League.

=== Chattogram Royals ===
In the 2026 Bangladesh Premier League player auction he was bought by the Chattogram Royals for ৳1.1 crore.

== International career ==
In September 2019, Naim received his maiden call up for the national team, when he was added to the squad for the last two Twenty20 Internationals (T20Is) in the 2019–20 Bangladesh Tri-Nation Series, but he did not play in the series. In October 2019, he was named in Bangladesh's T20I squad for their series against India. He made his T20I debut against India, on 3 November 2019.

In November 2019, Naim was named in Bangladesh's squad for the 2019 ACC Emerging Teams Asia Cup in Bangladesh. Later the same month, he was named in Bangladesh's squad for the men's cricket tournament at the 2019 South Asian Games. The Bangladesh team won the gold medal, after beating Sri Lanka by seven wickets in the final.

In February 2020, Naim was named in Bangladesh's One Day International (ODI) squad for their series against Zimbabwe. He made his ODI debut against Zimbabwe, on 6 March 2020.

In September 2021, Naim was named in Bangladesh's squad for the 2021 ICC Men's T20 World Cup. In December 2021, he named in Bangladesh's Test squad for their series against New Zealand. He made his Test debut for Bangladesh on 9 January 2022, against New Zealand.

On 23 June 2025 Bangladesh ODI squad for Sri Lanka tour was announced and he returned to the ODI team after almost 2 years.

== Teams Played ==
Bangladesh, Bangladesh U23, Bangladesh U19, Bangladesh A, Bangladesh Cricket Board XI, Dhaka Dynamites, Rangpur Rangers, Beximco Dhaka, Minister Group Dhaka.
