= Tamim Iqbal =

Bangladeshi cricketer (born 1989)

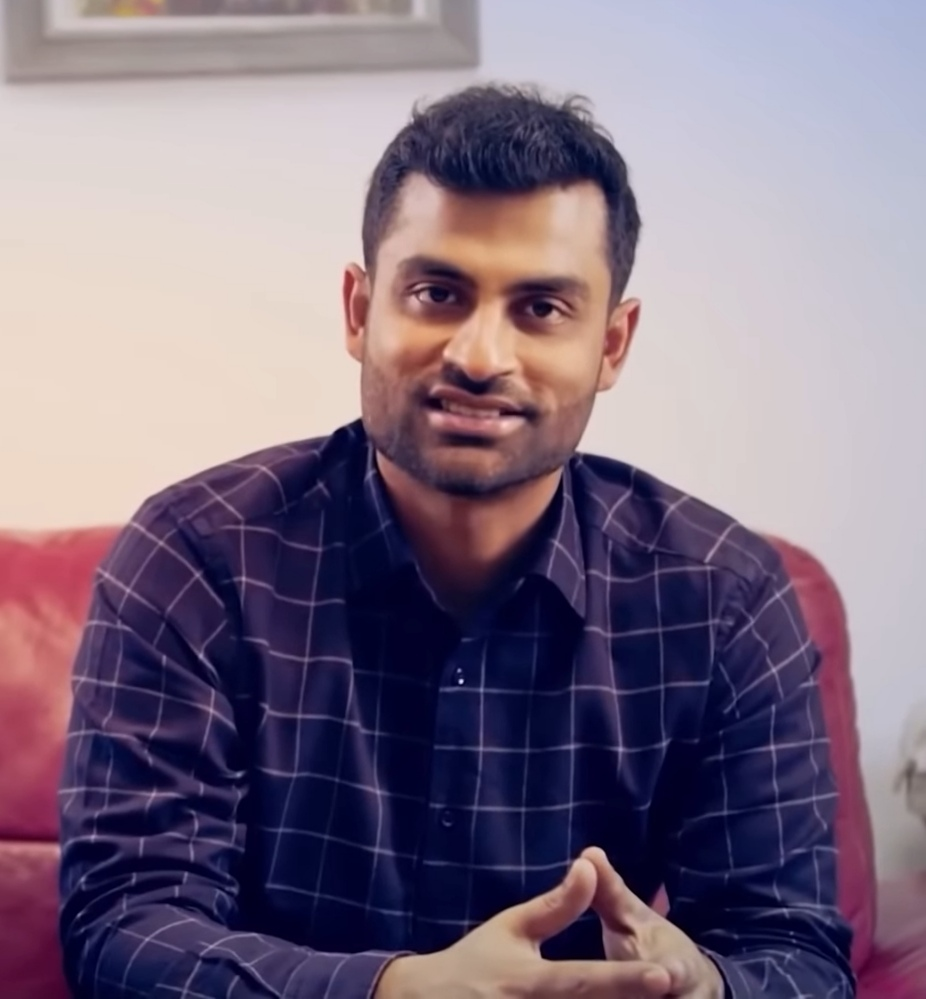
- Khan in 2024

President of Bangladesh Cricket Board
- Incumbent
- Assumed office 7 June 2026 (Note: acting:7 April 2026-6 June 2026)
- Vice President: Fahim Sinha
- Preceded by: Aminul Islam Bulbul
- Cricket career

Personal information
- Full name: Tamim Iqbal Khan
- Born: 20 March 1989 (age 37); Chittagong, Bangladesh
- Batting: Left-handed
- Role: Opening batter
- Relatives: Akram Khan (uncle); Nafees Iqbal (brother)

International information
- National side: Bangladesh (2007-2023)
- Test debut (cap 50): 4 January 2008 v New Zealand
- Last Test: 4 April 2023 v Ireland
- ODI debut (cap 84): 9 February 2007 v Zimbabwe
- Last ODI: 23 September 2023 v New Zealand
- ODI shirt no.: 28 (previously 29)
- T20I debut (cap 17): 1 September 2007 v Kenya
- Last T20I: 9 March 2020 v Zimbabwe
- T20I shirt no.: 28 (previously 29)

Domestic team information
- Years: Team
- 2004–present: Chittagong Division
- 2011: Nottinghamshire
- 2012: Chittagong Kings
- 2012/13: Wellington Firebirds
- 2013: Duronto Rajshahi, St Lucia Zouks
- 2015–2016: Chittagong Vikings
- 2016–2018: Peshawar Zalmi
- 2017: Essex
- 2017–2019: Comilla Victorians
- 2019/20: Dhaka Platoon
- 2020: Lahore Qalandars
- 2021: Fortune Barishal
- 2022: Minister Dhaka
- 2023: Khulna Tigers
- 2023/24–2024/25: Fortune Barishal

Career statistics
Competition	Test	ODI	T20I	FC
Matches	70	243	78	104
Runs scored	5,134	8,357	1,758	7,945
Batting average	38.89	36.65	24.08	43.17
100s/50s	10/31	14/56	1/7	17/44
Top score	206	158	103*	334*
Catches/stumpings	20/–	68/–	18/–	35/–
Medal record
Men's Cricket
Representing Bangladesh
ACC Asia Cup
Runner-up	2012 Bangladesh
Runner-up	2016 Bangladesh
Runner-up	2018 UAE
Asian Games
Bronze medal – third place	2014 Incheon	Team
- Source: ESPNcricinfo, 28 December 2023

Tamim Iqbal Khan (Bengali: তামিম ইকবাল খান; born 20 March 1989) is a Bangladeshi cricket administrator and former cricketer. He has served as the president of the Bangladesh Cricket Board (BCB) since June 2026. A left-handed opening batter, he represented Bangladesh from 2007 to 2023, with over 15,000 career runs across Tests, One Day Internationals (ODIs), and Twenty20 Internationals (T20Is). Iqbal served as the ODI captain from 2020 to 2023.

== Early and personal life ==
Tamim was born to Iqbal Khan (d. 2000) and Nusrat Iqbal Khan, in the port city of Chittagong. His paternal Khan family is a prestigious family in the city, his ancestors arrived to Chittagong from Bihar. His maternal family belongs to Salempur in Uttar Pradesh. Tamim is the brother of Nafees Iqbal and the nephew of Akram Khan, both of whom played Test cricket for Bangladesh.

Tamim's father, Iqbal, used to host small cricket tournaments to help his sons train and get better in cricket. His brother Nafees, a former national team cricketer, in an interview said, "Tamim was the more talented one. When Tamim was 12 or 13, he hit 148 as the team chased 150".

Tamim married Ayesha Siddiqa on 22 June 2013. They had an eight-year relationship prior to getting married. Their marriage involved a grand ceremony held at Chittagong and a similar kind of reception at Dhaka on 27th of the same month. Former Prime Minister Khaleda Zia was present at the event. He had his first son named Arham Iqbal Khan in 2016 and his first daughter named Alishba Iqbal Khan on 19 November 2019.

=== Health issue ===
On 24 March 2025, Tamim Iqbal suffered a heart attack during Match 24 of the Dhaka Premier Division Cricket League. According to India Today, Iqbal reported discomfort while fielding against Shinepukur Cricket Club at which a medical team arrived to treat him while a helicopter was being called for a possible airlift. He suffered an alleged second heart attack and started frothing at the mouth while being loaded into the helicopter, pausing the airlift and resulting in him being taken to the closer Sheikh Fazilatunnesa Mujib Memorial KPJ Specialised Hospital. Iqbal was in critical condition and was put on life support. He arrived at the hospital in critical condition, according to doctors, and tests revealed a blockage in his arteries. The hospital confirmed that Tamim had come to the hospital twice, the second time having suffered a heart attack. Doctors conducted an angiogram and angioplasty to remove the blockage.

== Domestic and T20 franchise career ==
=== National Cricket League ===
He plays first-class cricket for Chittagong Division cricket team.

=== County cricket ===
In 2011, Tamim became only the second (Note: Shakib Al Hasan was the first.) Bangladeshi to play county cricket in England when he signed to play for Nottinghamshire in June 2011. He was recruited as a short-term replacement for Australian batsmen David Hussey, who was called up to the national squad. During his stay, Tamim played five matches, scoring 104 runs with a highest score of 47. Tamim, whose batting was described in the Nottingham Post as "solid if unspectacular", remarked of his performance that "It could have been better, but it wasn't too bad". Even though he was playing in a foreign country, there was pressure from the media in Bangladesh for Tamim to perform – especially when Nottinghamshire faced Worcestershire who were fielding Shakib Al Hasan – with his exploits sometimes making the front pages. Tamim got selected to play for Essex in the NatWest T20 blast but left the tournament for personal reasons.

=== HRV Cup ===
In late October 2012, Wellington Firebirds signed him for the New Zealand domestic HRV Cup, a T20 competition.

=== Sri Lanka Premier League ===
He was picked up by Wayamba United for the 2012 Sri Lanka Premier League. Tamim scored 190 runs in 6 innings on an average of 38.00 with 1 half-century (93* off 61).

=== Indian Premier League ===
Tamim Iqbal remained unsold at his base price of $100,000 on 2011 IPL Draft.

He was signed by the Pune Warriors India for 2012 season, although never got chance to play.

=== Bangladesh Premier League ===
Tamim Iqbal was the icon player for the Chittagong Kings in the 2012 Bangladesh Premier League. He could play only 2 innings and scored 8 runs.

He was signed and chosen captain of Duronto Rajshahi in second edition of BPL. He scored 244 runs in 9 innings with 3 fifties.

In the 2015 Bangladesh Premier League, Tamim played for the Chittagong Vikings, and top-scored for his team scoring 298 runs in 9 innings on an average of 37.25 along with 3 fifties.

Tamim top-scored for his team again in the 2016 Bangladesh Premier League scoring 476 runs in 13 innings on an average of 43.27 with 6 fifties.

In the 2017 Bangladesh Premier League, Tamim played for the Comilla Victorians. He top-scored for his team yet again scoring 332 runs in 10 innings on an average of 36.88 along with 2 fifties.

In the 2019 Bangladesh Premier League, Tamim top-scored for his team scoring 467 runs in 14 innings on an average of 38.91 with 2 fifties and 1 century. His century (141* off 61) came in the final against the Dhaka Dynamites.

In November 2019, was selected to play for the Dhaka Platoon in the 2019–20 Bangladesh Premier League. and in the tournament he became first cricketer to past 2000 runs in BPL history. He scored 396 runs in 12 innings with 3 fifties.

For the 2022 Bangladesh Premier League, the Minister Group Dhaka signed Tamim. Tamim accumulated 407 runs in 9 innings on an average of 58.14 with 4 fifties and 1 century. His century (111* off 64) came against the Sylhet Sunrisers.

In the 2023 Bangladesh Premier League, Tamim signed for Khulna Tigers. He then top-scored for his team scoring 302 runs in 10 innings on an average of 33.55 with 2 fifties.

In the 2024 Bangladesh Premiere League, Tamim signed for Fortune Barishal. He was also chosen to captain the team. With three fifty's in the tournament, he scored 492 runs, with the strike rate of 127.13. Under his leadership, Barisal won the BPL for the first time.

In the 2025 Bangladesh Premiere League, he was retained by Fortune Barishal as the captain of the defending champion. In this season, he scored 413 runs with an average of 37.55, including 4 fifties in 14 matches. Tamim iqbal also maintained a strike rate of 129.06. Fortune Barishal remains the champion title under his outstanding leadership.

=== Caribbean Premier League ===
Tamim was classified as an international elite player for the inaugural Caribbean Premier League in 2013. He was picked by the St. Lucia Zouks, and scored 162 runs in 7 innings with 1 fifty.

In July 2014, he played for the Rest of the World team in the Bicentenary Celebration match at Lord's.

=== Pakistan Super League ===
Tamim was picked up by the Peshawar Zalmi for the 2016 Pakistan Super League. He top-scored for his team scoring 267 runs in 6 innings on an average of 66.75 with 3 fifties.

In the 2017 Pakistan Super League, Tamim scored 94 runs in 5 innings with 1 half-century.

In the 2018 Pakistan Super League, he scored 161 runs in 6 innings.

In 2020, he represented the Lahore Qalandars. He scored 83 runs in 3 innings.

=== Afghanistan Premier League ===
In September 2018, he was named in Nangarhar's squad in the first edition of the Afghanistan Premier League tournament.

=== Bangabandu T20 Cup ===
He played for Fortune Barishal in 2020-21 Bangabandhu T20 Cup.

== International career ==
=== Early career ===
Tamim, a young talent of Bangladesh, who played in the 2006 U-19 Cricket World Cup in Sri Lanka, was picked for the 2007 World Cup and played against India in the group stage of the competition, scoring 51 runs from 53 deliveries, helping his team to win the match. In December that year, the Bangladesh Cricket Board (BCB) granted Tamim a one-year grade C contract, one of 22 central contracts held by the Board at the time. Although he was still in the lowest tier of central contracts, it was an extension of his previous contract, which lasted six months.

On Bangladesh's tour of the West Indies in July and August 2009, Tamim scored his maiden Test century against a West Indies team weakened by disputes between players and administrators, which resulted in seven players making their Test debuts in the match. His effort with the bat helped Bangladesh to a historic victory – their first against the West Indies in Tests, their first overseas Test victory and only their second Test win. He ended up with scoring 128 runs and was named as the Man of the Match for his performance (he also scored 33 runs in the first innings). Speaking of his innings, Tamim said "It was a flat wicket, and if you concentrate hard and look to bat straight, it's a good track to score on. I'm just 20 and have played only 11 Tests, I think there are a lot more [innings like these] to come". Bangladesh went on to win the second Test, and in the process secured their first overseas series win. Iqbal was Bangladesh's leading run-scorer in the series with 197 runs.

Bangladesh's coach, Jamie Siddons, opined in January 2010 that Tamim had "the makings of a world-class opener".

=== Wisden Cricketer of the Year ===
During the first innings of the first Test against England in March 2010, Tamim scored 86 runs from 120 deliveries. In the process he became the fastest Bangladesh batsman to reach 1,000 Test runs in terms of innings, taking 19 to reach the landmark. He also became the third-youngest player in Test history (behind Sachin Tendulkar and compatriot Mohammad Ashraful) to reach 1,000 Test runs.

In May that year, Bangladesh toured England for two more Tests and three ODIs. Though his team lost 2–0, Tamim scored a century in each of the Tests. For his performances against England, Tamim was named one of the Wisden Cricketers' Almanack's four Cricketers of the Year in 2011. In October he was also named Wisden's Test Player of the Year, ahead of Graeme Swann and Virender Sehwag, who came second and third respectively. During the qualifying period for the award, Tamim scored 837 runs in seven Tests at an average of 59.78. It was just the second time a Bangladesh player had won the award, as Shakib Al Hasan was named the previous year. At the start of November, the BCB announced 16 central contracts. Tamim was one of six players at the top level.

=== Bangladesh vice-captain ===
In December 2010, Tamim replaced Mushfiqur Rahim as Bangladesh's vice-captain. In the opening match of the 2011 World Cup he scored 70 runs against India in a losing cause. In the following match against Ireland he scored 44 runs off 43 balls, and took a catch. In the next game against the West Indies, Tamim was caught at the slips for a third-ball duck as Bangladesh folded for its lowest ODI score, 58 all out. The following game against England he scored a quick fire 38 to get his team off to another good start, with Bangladesh eventually winning by two wickets.

Tamim became only the second Bangladeshi to play county cricket in England when he signed to play for Nottinghamshire in June 2011. He was recruited as a short-term replacement for Australian batsmen David Hussey, who was called up to the national squad. During his stay, Tamim played five matches, scoring 104 runs with a highest score of 47. Tamim, whose batting was described in the Nottingham Post as "solid if unspectacular", remarked of his performance that "It could have been better, but it wasn't too bad". Even though he was playing in a foreign country, there was pressure from the media in Bangladesh for Tamim to perform – especially when Nottinghamshire faced Worcestershire who were fielding Shakib Al Hasan – with his exploits sometimes making the front pages.

When Bangladesh toured Zimbabwe in July 2011 for a single Test and five ODIs, they did so with the expectation of winning. Zimbabwe were returning from a six-year exile from Tests, although Bangladesh had not played in the format in more than 14 months. Despite claiming in a press conference that Zimbabwe's bowlers posed little threat, Tamim managed 58 runs in the Test as Bangladesh slid to defeat. Bangladesh lost the following ODI series against Zimbabwe 3–2. Bangladesh's batsmen struggled early in the series, with Tamim managing 157 runs from five innings at an average of 31.40. In the aftermath of the series, Shakib and Tamim were sacked as captain and vice-captain, with a BCB representative citing their poor leadership.

=== Post vice-captain ===
West Indies toured in October, facing Bangladesh in a T20I, three ODIs and two Tests. Though Bangladesh lost the Test series 1–0, Tamim was his team's leading run-scorer with 186 from four innings, including two half-centuries. The BCB founded the six-team Bangladesh Premier League in 2012, a twenty20 tournament to be held in February that year. The BCB made Tamim the 'icon player' for Chittagong Kings. However, his appearances were limited due to a groin injury and he played just two matches and scored eight runs.

In March 2012 Bangladesh hosted the Asia Cup. Tamim, who was recovering from typhoid, was initially dropped from the squad on the orders of BCB president Mustafa Kamal. Controversy ensued as Kamal had overridden the selection committee and eventually Tamim was re-added to the squad. He responded by striking four consecutive half-centuries, becoming the first Bangladesh player to achieve the feat in ODIs. Bangladesh progressed to the final against all expectations, although they lost to Pakistan by 2 runs. Later that month Tamim signed with Pune Warriors in the Indian Premier League, but did not play a single match for the team. In April his top-level central contract with the BCB was renewed.

In late 2012 Bangladesh hosted West Indies, where Bangladesh won the ODI series, despite losing the T20 and the Test series. His highest score during the ODI and Test series was 58 and 72 runs respectively. Tamim's best performance in the overall series was the unbeaten 88 in the lone T20 match, despite losing the match for 18 runs short.

=== Post World Cup 2015 ===
After the 2015 Cricket World Cup, Bangladesh played a home series against Pakistan. Tamim played a superb ODI series against Pakistan, where he scored two back-to-back match-winning centuries. Eventually, Bangladesh white-washed Pakistan for the first time in an ODI series and Tamim was named as the Man of the series.

=== 2016 and beyond ===
Tamim was the highest run scorer at the 2016 ICC World Twenty20 held in India. This included an unbeaten 103* against Oman in the group stages of the tournament. He became the first Bangladesh cricketer to score an international T20I hundred whilst also surpassing the previous high score of 88* (also held by him). This subsequently helped Bangladesh qualify for the Super 10 stage. Tamim also led the highest number of 6's hit chart at the tournament.

In August 2016, Tamim sustained a fracture on the little finger, which ruled him out from competitive cricket for around three weeks. This means that he could be uncertain for selection for the ODIs against Afghanistan. but he was selected for ODIs and scored 80 and 118 in the first and third ODIs against Afghanistan.

During the first ODI against Sri Lanka on 26 March 2017, Tamim became the first Bangladeshi to score 10,000 international runs.

=== 2017 Champions Trophy ===
Preparing for the 2017 Champions Trophy, Iqbal scored a hundred against Pakistan in a warm-up game at Edgbaston in Birmingham. Playing against England in the first of the league games at The Oval, he scored 128 off 142 balls taking the team's total to 305 runs, which was later chased down by the latter. He scored 95 off 114 balls in the next game against Australia, a match that ended without result. In the semi-final against India, he scored 70 off 82 balls in a losing cause, finishing the tournament with 293 runs. He was also named as part of the 'Team of the Tournament' at the 2017 Champions Trophy by the ICC and ESPNcricinfo.

In August 2017, he was named in a World XI team to play three Twenty20 International matches against Pakistan in the 2017 Independence Cup in Lahore.

=== 2018 ===
On 23 January 2018 against Zimbabwe, Tamim became the first batsman for Bangladesh to reach 6,000 runs in ODIs. During this innings, Tamim also went past Sri Lankan legend Sanath Jayasuriya's 2,514 runs at the R. Premadasa Stadium to become highest run-scorer at a single venue in ODIs.

In April 2018, he was one of ten cricketers to be awarded a central contract by the Bangladesh Cricket Board (BCB) ahead of the 2018 season. In the same month, he was named in the Rest of the World XI squad for the one-off T20I against the West Indies, to be played at Lord's on 31 May 2018.

In July 2018, Tamim scored 287 runs with an average of 143.5 in a three-match series against West Indies and became the man of the series for the 4th time in ODI career, which was the second highest for a Bangladeshi player in ODI after Shakib Al Hasan. He jumped to the 13th position in ICC ODI Batsman Ranking with a career highest rating point of 737.

=== 2019 Cricket World Cup and beyond ===
In April 2019, he was named in Bangladesh's squad for the 2019 Cricket World Cup. On 2 July 2019, in the match against India, Tamim played in his 200th ODI.

In July 2019, Bangladesh's regular captain Mashrafe Mortaza was ruled out of the three-match ODI series against Sri Lanka due to a hamstring injury. Tamim was named as captain for the first time in ODIs. Prior to that he had only led Bangladesh in one Test match in 2017 against New Zealand.

=== 2020 ===
In March 2020, when Zimbabwe toured Bangladesh, he scored 158 runs off 136 balls in the 2nd ODI, highest individual score by any Bangladeshi batsman also second Bangladeshi batsman scored a century at Sylhet and he became the first Bangladeshi batsman to score 7,000 runs in ODIs. In the 3rd ODI, He scored 128 runs off 109 balls and made a partnership of 292 runs with Litton Das in the opening wicket which is the highest partnership for Bangladesh for any wicket in ODIs.

=== ODI captaincy (2020–2023) ===
Iqbal's record as captain
Format ↓	Matches	Won	Lost	Drawn/NR
Test	1	0	1	0
ODI	15	8	7	0
T20I	Did not captain			
Last updated on: 20 July 2021

On 8 March 2020, Tamim was named the ODI captain of Bangladesh after Mashrafe Mortaza stepped down as ODI captain post Zimbabwe series in March 2020.

Since he took full time ODI captaincy, Bangladesh played their first ODI series against Windies in January 2021. Bangladesh went on to win the series by 3–0, while scoring 158 runs in three matches, he was the most run scorer in the series.

In May 2021, Sri Lanka toured Bangladesh for 3-match ODI series. Bangladesh won the first two matches and lost the third match and eventually won the ODI series by 2–1. It was Bangladesh's first bilateral series win against Sri Lanka.

On August 3, 2023, Tamim stepped down from the captaincy because of complications arising from a persistent back injury. He has been ruled out of the 2023 Asia Cup but hopes to be fit before the three-month tour by New Zealand commencing September 21st. His successor has yet to be announced. Tamim led Bangladesh in 37 ODI matches, of which the Tigers won 21, lost 14 and 2 were no results.

== As a cricket administrator ==
On 7 April 2026, he was appointed as the ad-hoc committee president of the Bangladesh Cricket Board. In June 2026, he won the election and was elected as the President of the Board.

== International centuries ==
He is the highest individual run scorer for Bangladesh in limited-over formats and the only Bangladeshi cricketer to score centuries in all three formats of the game. Tamim is also Bangladesh's highest century maker in international matches with 25 centuries, combining all forms of cricket.

== Temporary retirement and its withdrawal ==
On 27 January 2022, Iqbal took a six-month break from T20Is, and on 17 June 2022, shortly after winning the ODI series against West Indies by a 3–0 margin, he announced his retirement from T20I cricket through a Facebook post stating "Please consider me retired from T20Is from today. Thank you, everyone". On 6 July 2023, Tamim announced retirement from international cricket at a sudden press brief. He told ''Yesterday's match against Afghanistan was the last match of my career. I'm retiring from international cricket, effective from right now. It was not a suddenly taken decision. Was thinking about it for a long time . I've even talked to family about it''. After a meeting with the Prime Minister Sheikh Hasina and with the mediations from Mashrafe Mortaza and Nazmul Hassan in Gonobhaban (Official Residence for the Prime Minister), due to the Prime Minister's personal intervention, Tamim has withdrawn decision to retire. '' The Hon'ble Prime Minister invited me personally to her residence, Mashrafe bhai [ Mashrafe Mortaza] was there, Papon bhai [ Nazmul Hassan] was also there. We had a long discussion, a long meeting.The Prime Minister has directed me that I might play. So I'm withdrawing my retirement decision right at this moment. Because I can say no to anybody. But the person who is the biggest [the most important] of the country, it's impossible for me to turn her down'', he spoke to the media after the meeting. On 10 January 2025, Tamim finally bid farewell to international cricket. In a post on his verified Facebook page, Tamim wrote, "I have been away from international cricket for quite some time, and I feel the distance will never end as this chapter of my life has come to an end".

== Records and achievements ==
=== National ===
- First Bangladeshi to score 10,000, 11,000, 12,000, 13,000 & 14,000 international runs.
- First batsman for Bangladesh to reach 6,000, 7,000 and 8,000 runs in ODIs.
- First Bangladeshi batsman to score 6000 runs in T20s.
- Named as one of Wisden Cricketers' Almanack's four Cricketers of the Year, and Wisden's Test Player of the Year, becoming just the second Bangladeshi player to be awarded the accolade (in 2011).
- Only Bangladeshi cricketer to score centuries in all three formats of the game.
- Most 100s in international cricket for Bangladesh - 25
- The highest run-scorer for Bangladesh in international cricket, including Test, ODIs and second (Note: after Shakib Al Hasan.) in T20Is
- Highest scorer in first-class cricket by a Bangladeshi batsman (with 334 *, for East Zone in the opening round of the 2019–20 Bangladesh Cricket League tournament.)
- First Ever Bangladeshi batsman to achieve the milestone of scoring 8000 runs in recognized T20s.

=== International ===
- Highest run-scorer at a single venue in ODIs.
