= Mushfiqur Rahim =

Bangladeshi cricketer (born 1987)

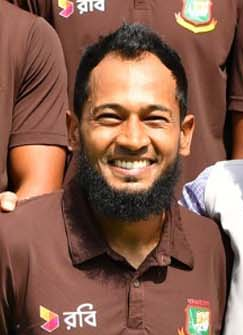
- Rahim in 2024

Personal information
- Born: 9 May 1987 (age 39); Bogura, Bangladesh
- Height: 5 ft 2 in (157 cm)
- Batting: Right-handed
- Bowling: Right-arm off break
- Role: Wicket-keeper Batter
- Relatives: Mahmudullah (brother-in-law)

International information
- National side: Bangladesh (2005–present)
- Test debut (cap 41): 26 May 2005 v England
- Last Test: 15 November 2026 v South Africa
- ODI debut (cap 81): 6 August 2006 v Zimbabwe
- Last ODI: 24 February 2025 v New Zealand
- ODI shirt no.: 15 (formerly 9)
- T20I debut (cap 6): 28 November 2006 v Zimbabwe
- Last T20I: 1 September 2022 v Sri Lanka
- T20I shirt no.: 15

Domestic team information
- Years: Team
- 2006; 2008–2024: Rajshahi Division
- 2007; 2025: Sylhet Division
- 2012: Duronto Rajshahi, Nagenahira Nagas
- 2013: Sylhet Royals
- 2015: Sylhet Super Stars
- 2016: Karachi Kings, Barisal Bulls
- 2017: Rajshahi Kings
- 2018: Nangarhar Leopards
- 2019/20; 2021/22: Khulna Tigers
- 2020: Beximco Dhaka
- 2023: Sylhet Strikers
- 2024–present: Fortune Barishal

Career statistics
Competition	Test	ODI	T20I	FC
Matches	108	274	102	163
Runs scored	7,062	7,795	1,500	10,036
Batting average	38.80	36.42	19.48	39.05
100s/50s	14/30	9/49	0/6	21/46
Top score	219*	144	72*	219*
Catches/stumpings	115/15	243/56	42/30	187/23
Medal record
Men's Cricket
Representing Bangladesh
Asia Cup
Runner-up	2012 Bangladesh
Runner-up	2016 Bangladesh
Runner-up	2018 UAE
- Source: ESPNcricinfo, 19 November 2026

Mohammad Mushfiqur Rahim (Bengali: মোহাম্মদ মুশফিকুর রহিম; born 9 May 1987) is a Bangladeshi professional cricketer who has played as a right-handed batter and wicket-keeper. Representing Bangladesh since 2005, he has accumulated over 16,000 career runs across the three international formats. As of June 2026, he holds the record for the most career runs in Test matches for Bangladesh. Rahim served as the captain of Bangladesh in Tests from 2011 to 2017, and in One Day Internationals (ODIs) and Twenty20 Internationals (T20I) from 2011 to 2014.

In domestic cricket, he has represented Rajshahi Division in 2006 and from 2008 to 2024, and Sylhet Division in 2007 and since 2025. Rahim has played for several T20 franchises in the Bangladesh Premier League since 2012.

== Early life and family ==
Rahim was born on 9 May 1987 in Bogura, Bangladesh. Born to Mahbub Habib and Rahima Khatun, he finished his secondary schooling at Bogura Zilla School. In between playing cricket, he studied history at the Jahangirnagar University. He graduated with a master's degree from the university in 2012. He married Jannatul Kifayet Mondi in 2014. Mondi is the sister of Mahmudullah's wife, Jannatul Kawsar Mishti. Rahim had a son, Mayan, in 2018.

== Early career ==
Before playing for the national team, Rahim played for Bangladesh Under-19s. He represented them in three Youth Tests and 18 Youth One Day Internationals (ODIs) between 2004 and 2006, averaging 31.75 and 36.00 with the bat in the respective formats. Rahim trained at the Bangladesh Institute of Sports.

During the 2006 U-19 Cricket World Cup, hosted by Sri Lanka in February, Rahim captained the Bangladesh team which included future international players Shakib Al Hasan and Tamim Iqbal among others. Rahim was one of two players at the tournament with Test-match experience. Under his guidance Bangladesh reached the quarter finals of the tournament. Later that month Rahim was recalled to the senior Test squad for the first time since the England tour in 2005. He was selected as a specialist batsmen, with Khaled Mashud chosen as the wicket-keeper for the series against Sri Lanka.

== Domestic and T20 franchise career ==
At the domestic level he represents Rajshahi Division. In T20 cricket, all of Rahim's runs came playing for Bangladesh, Bangladesh A, Duronto Rajshahi, Nagenahira Nagas, Sylhet Royals, Chittagong Vikings, Karachi Kings, Barishal Bulls, Rajshahi Kings, Nangharhar Leopards, Khulna Tigers and Beximco Dhaka.

=== National Cricket League ===
In December 2010, Rahim recorded his best score in a one-day match. Playing for Rajshahi in the National Cricket League, he scored 114 runs from 120 deliveries as his team lost by 8 runs.

Representing Rajshahi Division in domestic cricket, Rahim has over 6500 first-class runs to his name including twelve half-centuries and thirty four centuries.

=== Bangladesh Cricket League ===
In the 2012-2013 season the match against Central Zone, got his 1st first-class wicket by dismissing Nurul Hasan playing for North Zone as he returned bowling figures of 1–23 in 10 overs.

=== Bangladesh Premier League ===
The Bangladesh Cricket Board (BCB) founded the six-team Bangladesh Premier League in 2012, a twenty20 tournament to be held in February that year. The BCB made Mushfiq the 'icon player' for Duronto Rajshahi. Under his leadership Duronto overcame a weak start to progress to the semi-finals where they lost to Barisal Burners; Rahim contributed 234 runs from 11 matches.

In January 2013, he was named in the squad for Sylhet Royals, following the draft for the 2013 season. He was the leading run-scorer in that tournament, with 440 runs in 13 matches at an average of 40.40.

In November 2016, he was named in the squad for the Barisal Bulls team, following the draft for the 2016–17 Bangladesh Premier League. He was one of the leading run scorers in that tournament, with 341 runs in 12 matches at an average of 37.88, which included two half-centuries.

In October 2018, he was named in the squad for the Chittagong Vikings team, following the draft for the 2018–19 Bangladesh Premier League. He was the leading run-scorer for the team in the tournament, with 426 runs in thirteen matches.

In November 2019, he was selected to play for the Khulna Tigers in the 2019–20 Bangladesh Premier League. He was the second highest run-scorer in that tournament, scoring 491 runs in 14 matches, at an average of 70.14 which included 4 half-centuries. He also posted his career-best knock of 98* runs against Cumilla Warriors.

In November 2022, he was named in the Sylhet Strikers' squad, following the players draft for the 2022–23 Bangladesh Premier League. On 10 January 2023, in the 10th match against the Dhaka Dominators, he became the first cricketer to play 100 matches in the Bangladesh Premier League.

In January 2024, he was named in the Fortune Barishal's squad, following the players draft for the 2024 Bangladesh Premier League.

=== Afghanistan Premier League ===
In September 2018, he was named in Nangarhar's squad in the first edition of the Afghanistan Premier League tournament.

=== Bangabandhu T20 Cup ===
He played for Beximco Dhaka in 2020-21 Bangabandhu T20 Cup.

== International career ==
=== 2005–2006 ===
Rahim was selected for Bangladesh's tour of England in 2005. It was Bangladesh's first tour of England, where they faced unfamiliar conditions and the batsmen struggled against seam bowling and uneven bounce throughout the series. Rahim adapted his batting style in the warm up matches, "consistently playing late and straight" according to Wisden, and managed to score 63 runs against Sussex and scored 115 runs not out against Northamptonshire in the warm up matches.

Although initially named in the squad as a part-time wicket-keeper, his performances in the warm up matches led to his selection for the first Test at Lord's as a specialist batsman as well. The 17-year-old Rahim scored 19 runs in the first innings and was one of just three batsman to reach double figures as Bangladesh were dismissed for 108. After twisting his ankle, he did not play any further in the tour.

=== 2006–2007 ===
Rahim was included in Bangladesh's squad to tour Zimbabwe for five ODIs in 2006. He was one of three uncapped ODI players included in the squad alongside all-rounders Farhad Reza and Shakib Al Hasan. He scored his maiden half-century at Harare against Zimbabwe.

=== 2007–2008 ===
His good performances led him to be picked as the first-choice wicket-keeper ahead of Khaled Mashud for the World Cup in the West Indies.

Rahim was recalled for the second Test against Sri Lanka in July 2007, replacing Mashud. Although Bangladesh lost by an innings and 90 runs, Rahim combined with Mohammad Ashraful – the new captain – to score a record 191 runs for Bangladesh's sixth-wicket partnership. In December 2007, the Bangladesh Cricket Board (BCB) granted Rahim a one-year grade B (third tier) contract, one of 22 central contracts with the Board at the time.

=== 2008–2010 ===
Following the 2007 ICC Cricket World Cup, Rahim endured a series of poor scores, including five innings in which he amassed four runs altogether. As a result, when South Africa toured in March for three ODIs and Bangladesh went to Pakistan for five ODIs the next month, Rahim was dropped in favour of Dhiman Ghosh.

Rahim was recalled to the squad for a tri-series with Pakistan and India and the 2008 Asia Cup. When 17 contracts were announced in April 2009, Rahim's was renewed, marking Rahim as Bangladesh's first choice 'keeper.

=== Captaincy ===
Rahim was appointed vice-captain for Bangladesh's tour of Zimbabwe in August 2009. The position was vacated as the previous holder, Shakib Al Hasan, was filling-in as captain for the injured Mashrafe Mortaza. Bangladesh won the five match ODI series 4–1. In the final ODI, Rahim scored 98 runs, beating his previous highest score in list A matches of 58, to help his team to victory. With 169 runs in the series at an average of 56.33, Rahim finished the tour as Bangladesh's fourth-highest run scorer.

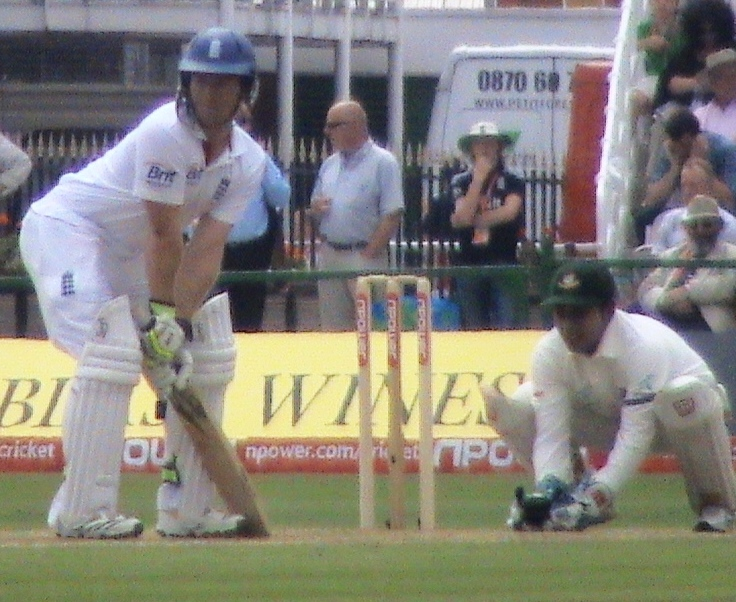
Rahim keeping wicket against England at Old Trafford in 2010

Rahim retained the vice-captaincy for the home Test series against India in January and February 2010. On 21 January, in the fifth day of the first Test, he scored his maiden Test century and the fastest by a Bangladeshi in Test cricket, off only 112 balls as Bangladesh delayed an Indian victory, being the last man out as India won by 113 runs. England toured Bangladesh in February and March for two Tests and three ODIs, where Bangladesh lost all two formats. In the series, Rahim was his team's second-highest run-scorer. He scored two half-centuries in the first Test, becoming the 6th Bangladeshi batsman to perform the feat.

Having impressed at home, Rahim's performance in the return tour in England in May was expected to be crucial for the rankings. In the tour, Rahim could only manage 40 runs from two Tests as Bangladesh's batsmen struggled in English conditions and slumped to a 2–0 defeat. In the first ODI of the tour Rahim was struck in the face while keeping wickets to spinner Faisal Hossain. An x-ray revealed no fractures, however as a precaution he was rested for a week, missing the rest of the series.

In November 2010, BCB announced 16 central contracts. Rahim was one of six players in the top level. In December 2010, Tamim Iqbal replaced Rahim as Bangladesh's vice-captain.

=== 2011-2012 ===
Rahim was included in Bangladesh's 15-man squad for the 2011 World Cup. Bangladesh were knocked out in the group stage and Rahim had a poor tournament personally. There were suggestions that he could be dropped, especially as fellow wicket-keeper Dhiman Ghosh was scoring heavily in Bangladesh's domestic competition. In August 2011, hit 101 runs from 100 balls having his second century against Zimbabwe which was not enough to stop Bangladesh losing the third one-day series by five runs.

=== National captain (2011–2018) ===
Mushfiqur Rahim's record as captain
Format ↓	Matches	Won	Lost	Drawn/NR
Test	34	7	18	9
ODI	37	11	24	2
T20I	23	8	14	1
Last updated on: 24 March 2020

On 20 September 2011, Rahim was named Bangladesh captain, taking over from Shakib Al Hasan after a disappointing tour of Zimbabwe. The announcement was made midway through the BCB Cup, a tournament involving the senior Bangladesh team, Bangladesh A, and a team made up of academy players. Rahim had already been captaining Bangladesh in the tournament on a temporary basis. The competition was won by Bangladesh A.

In 2011, West Indies toured Bangladesh in October for a T20I, three ODIs, and two Tests. In his first international match as captain, Rahim produced a Man-of-the-Match performance, scoring 41 runs not out from 26 balls to help his team to victory. Despite T20I win, Bangladesh lost the ODI series 2–1. Rahim was Bangladesh's leading run-scorer with 100 runs, including a fifty. The following month, Pakistan toured for three ODIs and two Tests. Bangladesh lost the ODI series 3–0, and Rahim managed just 12 runs from three innings.

=== 2012-2015 ===
In the 2012 Asia Cup, under Rahim's captaincy, Bangladesh won two out of the three games they have played and reached the final for the first time where they lost to Pakistan. In April his grade A+ central contract was renewed. On 11 March 2013, during the first test of the tour of Sri Lanka in Galle, Rahim became the first Bangladeshi to score a double hundred, beating the previous highest of 190 set by Mohammed Ashraful earlier in the day.

Rahim announced his resignation as captain on 8 May 2013, but a few days later Rahim announced he had made a "mistake", and on 3 July 2013 the BCB announced they would be retaining him as captain until the end of the year.

Rahim continued his captaincy in 2014 and lost to Sri Lanka in a home series. During the series, he suffered a finger injury and Mohammad Mithun replaced him as wicket-keeper. He also missed out the T20 international matches against Sri Lanka in which Mashrafe Mortaza took the job of captaincy. He scored his second one-day international century against India at the beginning of the 2014 Asia Cup but struggled in that match with his injury.

In the next match against Afghanistan, Rahim continued his good form but Bangladesh lost the match by 32 runs, the first time they had lost to an associate team since gaining Test status. His team also lost the match against Pakistan in that same tournament even after scoring 326 runs which was their highest ODI score, courtesy of Shahid Afridi's knock. Later they lost to Sri Lanka in their last match of the series which made them lose all three matches.

Bangladesh qualified for the super 10s in the 2014 ICC World Twenty20, by winning two of their three matches in the qualifying stage. But they were knocked out in the super 10s, having lost all the four matches.

Bangladesh toured the West Indies in August 2014. During the first Test, he scored 116 in the second innings, picking up his third Test century. However, they lost all three ODIs and two Test matches.

In September 2014, the BCB appointed Mortaza as the ODI captain, although Rahim retained the Test captaincy. In November 2014, Bangladesh whitewashed Zimbabwe in both the three Tests and five ODIs. He was also awarded the man of the series for the ODI matches.

During the group stage of the 2015 Cricket World Cup, Bangladesh defeated England, as a result they qualified for the second quarterfinal. In that match Mahmudullah Riyad and Rahim made the highest partnership (141 runs) for any wicket for Bangladesh in a World Cup match which was also Bangladesh's highest ODI partnership against England.

=== 2017-2018 ===
During the first Test against New Zealand at Basin Reserve in January 2017, Rahim was hit on the back of the helmet on the fifth day of match and immediately taken to hospital. The incident took place in the 43rd over of Bangladesh's second innings when Tim Southee bowled a bouncer that hit Rahim just behind left ear as he was trying to duck. Initial X-rays and scans to his neck suggested he was out of immediate danger. Rahim attended the post match presentation after receiving treatment.

In March 2017, during the second Test against Sri Lanka, Rahim took his 100th dismissal as a wicket-keeper. He became the first wicket-keeper in history for Bangladesh to reach this milestone.

On 15 October 2017, during the first ODI against South Africa, Rahim became the first batsman for Bangladesh to score an international century against South Africa in any format.

He was selected as wicket keeper in the Test XI of the year 2017 by ESPNcricinfo.

=== 2018-2019 ===
In November 2018, he scored 219 not out against Zimbabwe to become the first wicket-keeper–batsman to score two double centuries in Test cricket,(a third double hundred coming in 2020) His score of 219* is currently the highest individual score in a Test innings by a Bangladeshi batsman. Later the same month, against the West Indies, he became the second batsman for Bangladesh to score 4,000 runs in Tests.

=== 2019 Cricket World Cup ===
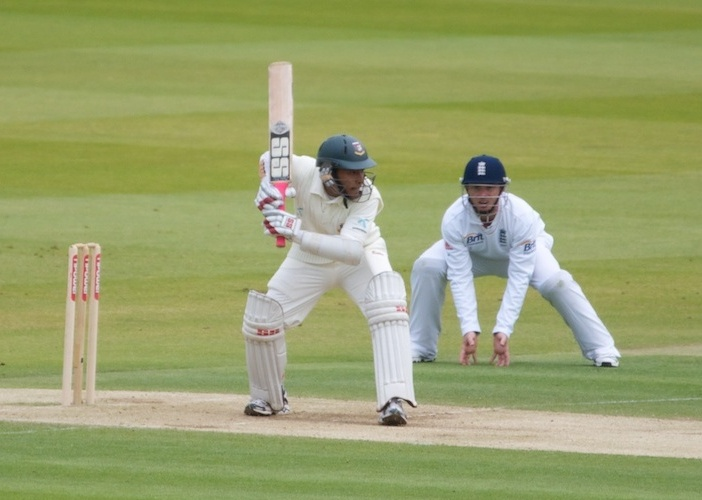
Rahim batting against England in a Test at Lord's in May 2010.

In April 2019, he was named in Bangladesh's squad for the 2019 Cricket World Cup. In the first innings of Bangladesh's opening match in the World Cup, against South Africa, he scored an 80 runs total of 78 balls, contributing to a 142 run partnership with Shakib Al Hasan. Bangladesh went on to score their highest total in an ODI match, finishing on 330/6 from their 50 overs, beating South Africa by 21 runs.

In Bangladesh's next match of the tournament, against New Zealand, Rahim played in his 350th international match for Bangladesh.

In the match against Australia, he scored his first century in Cricket World Cup. He scored 102* runs in 97 balls and became third Bangladeshi batsman to score a century in world cup. Bangladesh also broke the record of their highest total ODI runs in this match, scoring 333 for 8 wickets.

=== 2020-2021 ===
In February 2020, when Zimbabwe toured Bangladesh, he scored an unbeaten 203 runs, becoming the only Bangladeshi batsman to score three double-hundreds in Test cricket.

In December 2020, he was named in Bangladesh's Test and ODI squad for their series against West Indies. This was Bangladesh's first international series after COVID-19 pandemic that stopped cricket in the country since March 2020.

=== 2021-2022 ===
On 25 May 2021, against Sri Lanka in the second ODI, he scored 125 and helped his team to win the second ODI and the series as well (Bangladesh's first ever series win against Sri Lanka). After winning the match, he went on to become the first ever and the only Bangladeshi player to win 150 international matches. Later, he became the man of the series and scored the most runs (237) in the series.

In September 2021, he was named in Bangladesh's squad for the 2021 ICC Men's T20 World Cup.

=== 2023-2024 ===
In March 2023, in the second ODI against Ireland, Rahim scored the fastest century by a Bangladeshi player, in terms of the number of balls faced in an ODI (60). He also became the third cricketer from Bangladesh to score 7,000 runs in ODIs.

In December 2023, during the second and final test match in Bangladesh's home test series against New Zealand, Rahim was ruled out for obstructing the field during the 41st over of the match on day one of the match's proceedings. Rahim was clearly handling the ball and he was dismissed for 35 when he deflected the ball using his hands soon after defending the ball bowled by Kyle Jamieson. New Zealand fielders eventually appealed for Rahim's attempt to deflect the ball away from the stumps. It became the first such instance in last 72 years in test cricket (Len Hutton in 1951 was the previous batter to be dismissed) where a batsman was given out for obstructing the field.

=== 2024-2025 ===
In January 2025, he was named in Bangladesh's squad for the 2025 ICC Champions Trophy. On 5 March 2025, he announced his retirement from ODI format.

== List of international centuries ==
Rahim scored the first Test double century for Bangladesh, and has scored centuries on eleven occasions in Test matches and nine occasions in ODIs.

Test centuries scored by Mushfiqur Rahim
No.	Score	Opponents	Venue	Date	Result	Ref
1	101	India	Zohur Ahmed Chowdhury Stadium, Chattogram	17 January 2010	Bangladesh lost	
2	200	Sri Lanka	Galle International Stadium, Galle	8 March 2013	Drawn	
3	116	West Indies	Arnos Vale Stadium, Kingstown	5 September 2014	Bangladesh lost	
4	159	New Zealand	Basin Reserve, Wellington	12 January 2017	Bangladesh lost	
5	127	India	Rajiv Gandhi International Stadium, Hyderabad	9 February 2017	Bangladesh lost	
6	219	Zimbabwe	Sher-e-Bangla National Stadium, Dhaka	11 November 2018	Bangladesh won	
7	203*	Zimbabwe	Sher-e-Bangla National Stadium, Dhaka	22 February 2020	Bangladesh won	
8	105	Sri Lanka	Zohur Ahmed Chowdhury Stadium, Chattogram	15 May 2022	Drawn	
9	175*	Sri Lanka	Sher-e-Bangla National Stadium, Dhaka	23 May 2022	Bangladesh lost	
10	126	Ireland	Sher-e-Bangla National Stadium, Dhaka	4 April 2023	Bangladesh won	
11	191	Pakistan	Rawalpindi Cricket Stadium, Rawalpindi	21 August 2024	Bangladesh won	
12	163	Sri Lanka	Galle International Stadium, Galle	17 June 2025	Match drawn	
13	106	Ireland	Sher-e-Bangla National Stadium, Dhaka	20 November 2025	Bangladesh won	

One Day International centuries scored by Mushfiqur Rahim
No.	Score	Opponents	Venue	Date	Result	Ref
1	101	Zimbabwe	Harare Sports Club, Harare	16 August 2011	Bangladesh lost	
2	117	India	Khan Shaheb Osman Ali Stadium, Fatullah	26 February 2014	Bangladesh lost	
3	106	Pakistan	Sher-e-Bangla National Cricket Stadium, Dhaka	17 April 2015	Bangladesh won	
4	107	Zimbabwe	Sher-e-Bangla National Cricket Stadium, Dhaka	7 November 2015	Bangladesh won	
5	110*	South Africa	De Beers Diamond Oval, Kimberly	15 October 2017	Bangladesh lost	
6	144	Sri Lanka	Dubai International Cricket Stadium, Dubai	15 September 2018	Bangladesh won	
7	102*	Australia	Trent Bridge, Nottingham	20 June 2019	Bangladesh lost	
8	107	Sri Lanka	Sher-e-Bangla National Cricket Stadium, Dhaka	25 May 2021	Bangladesh won	
9	100*	Ireland	Sylhet International Cricket Stadium, Sylhet	20 March 2023	No result	

== Records and achievements ==
- ICC Men's ODI Team of the Year: 2021.
- Most Test runs for Bangladesh
- First Bangladeshi batsman to score three double-hundreds in Test cricket. (203*, in February 2020, in one-off the Test against Zimbabwe.)
- First wicketkeeper to record two Test double centuries (In November 2018 against Zimbabwe). He finished his innings on 219*, the highest individual score by a Bangladesh batsman in Test cricket. and faced 421 balls spending 589 minutes at the crease during the innings, a record for a Bangladesh batsman in a Test innings.
- Second Bangladeshi batsman to score 4,000 runs in Tests.
- First Bangladeshi batsman to reach 5000 Test runs.
- First Bangladeshi batsman to reach 6000 Test runs.

== Disciplinary issues ==
Rahim was criticized for trying to hit his teammate, Nasum Ahmed, following an incident in the eliminator of the Bangabandhu T20 Cup where both of them were going for the same catch and barely avoided a collision the catch being taken by Rahim. Rahim, the captain of Beximco Dhaka, was visibly annoyed with his teammate and threatened to throw a punch at him. Rahim apologized to his teammate and the BCB fined him 25% of his match fees and issued one demerit point for the incident.

Preceded by Shakib Al Hasan	Bangladesh national cricket captain 2011–2014	Succeeded by Mashrafe Mortaza
