= Mohammad Mithun =

Bangladeshi cricketer

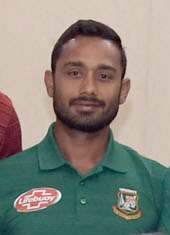
- Mithun in 2019

Personal information
- Full name: Mohammad Mithun Ali
- Born: 2 March 1991 (age 35); Kushtia, Khulna, Bangladesh
- Height: 1.78 m (5 ft 10 in)
- Batting: Right-handed
- Bowling: Right-arm off break
- Role: Batsman

International information
- National side: Bangladesh (2014–present)
- Test debut (cap 91): 11 November 2018 v Zimbabwe
- Last Test: 11 February 2021 v West Indies
- ODI debut (cap 111): 17 June 2014 v India
- Last ODI: 20 July 2021 v Zimbabwe
- ODI shirt no.: 8
- T20I debut (cap 41): 12 February 2014 v Sri Lanka
- Last T20I: 30 March 2021 v New Zealand

Domestic team information
- Years: Team
- 2006–2009: Sylhet Division
- 2009–present: Khulna Division
- 2012: Barisal Burners
- 2013: Khulna Royal Bengals
- 2015–2018: Rangpur Riders
- 2018–present: Kandahar Knights
- 2019: Sylhet Thunder
- 2022: Sylhet Sunrisers
- 2022-23: Dhaka Dominators
- 2024: Sylhet Strikers
- 2025: Chittagong Kings

Career statistics
Competition	Test	ODI	T20I	FC
Matches	10	34	17	143
Runs scored	333	714	127	7,242
Batting average	18.50	27.46	10.58	32.33
100s/50s	0/2	0/6	0/0	16/35
Top score	67	73*	47	206
Balls bowled	–	12	–	863
Wickets	–	0	–	21
Bowling average	–	–	–	28.19
5 wickets in innings	–	–	–	1
10 wickets in match	–	–	–	0
Best bowling	–	–	–	7/75
Catches/stumpings	6/–	7/–	4/–	180/25
Medal record
Representing Bangladesh
Men's Cricket
Asian Games
Gold medal – first place	2010 Guangzhou	Team
Bronze medal – third place	2014 Incheon	Team
South Asian Games
Gold medal – first place	2010 Dhaka	Team
- Source: Cricinfo, 19 April 2026

Mohammad Mithun (Bengali: মোহাম্মদ মিঠুন; born March 3, 1991) is a Bangladeshi cricketer and the captain of Dhaka Capitals. He made his first class debut in the 2006/07 season for Sylhet Division. He made his international debut for Bangladesh in February 2014.

== Domestic career ==
Mithun made his first-class debut playing for Sylhet Division in November 2006. He enjoyed a good limited-overs season in 2008/09 when he topped the run charts for his team with 285 runs at an imposing strike rate of 105.

In October 2018, Mithun was named in the squad for the Rangpur Riders team, following the draft for the 2018–19 Bangladesh Premier League. In November 2019, he was selected to play for the Sylhet Thunder in the 2019–20 Bangladesh Premier League. In November 2021, he was selected to play for the Kandy Warriors following the players' draft for the 2021 Lanka Premier League.

== International career ==
Mithun was named as replacement for captain Mushfiqur Rahim in the two-match T20I series against Sri Lanka in February 2014 as the wicketkeeper. Mithun had been in Bangladesh cricket team's World T20 squad in 2009, making this his second inclusion in the senior team. He was then called up to the ODI squad for the three-match series against India in June 2014 and made his ODI debut and scored 26 runs.

In October 2018, Mithun was named in Bangladesh's Test squad for their series against Zimbabwe. He made his debut against Zimbabwe on 11 November 2018. He became the most experienced first-class cricketer from Bangladesh to make his Test debut, with 88 matches.

In April 2019, Mithun was named in Bangladesh's 15 man squad for the 2019 Cricket World Cup.
