= 2021–22 National Cricket League =

Domestic cricket tournament

- Dates: 15 October – 25 November 2021
- Administrator: Bangladesh Cricket Board
- Cricket format: First-class
- Tournament format: Double round-robin
- Champions: Dhaka Division (6th title)
- Participants: 8
- Matches: 24
- Most runs: Fazle Mahmud (603)
- Most wickets: Hasan Murad (33)

The 2021–22 National Cricket League was the twenty-third edition of the National Cricket League (NCL), a first-class cricket competition held in Bangladesh from 15 October to 25 November 2021. In March 2021, Bangladesh Cricket Board (BCB) announced the domestic cricket schedule from 2021 to 2023 and confirmed that the 23rd NCL would be held in October 2021. Khulna Division were the defending champions.

Dhaka Division won the tournament, with Chittagong Division gaining promotion from tier 2 to tier 1.

== Fixtures ==
=== Tier 1 ===
Points table

Teams	Pld	W	L	D	A	Pts
Dhaka Division	6	3	1	2	0	35.29
Rangpur Division	6	2	0	4	0	31.74
Sylhet Division	6	1	3	2	0	20.56
Khulna Division	6	1	3	2	0	19.82

- 2021–22 Champions
- Bottom placed team relegated to Tier 2 for 2022–23 National Cricket League.

17–20 October 2021
Scorecard

Sylhet Division	v	Dhaka Division
67 (22 overs); Rahatul Ferdous 18* (30); Nazmul Islam 6/23 (8 overs)		176 (41 overs); Shuvagata Hom 50 (69); Enamul Haque 4/66 (13 overs)
174 (71.4 overs); Amite Hasan 76 (209); Nazmul Islam 4/41 (24.4 overs)		66/3 (20.5 overs); Rony Talukdar 20 (32); Ebadot Hossain 1/8 (7 overs)

Dhaka Division won by 7 wickets
Sylhet International Cricket Stadium Academy Ground, Sylhet
Umpires: Shafiuddin Ahmed and Masudur Rahman
Player of the match: Shuvagata Hom (Dhaka Division)

- Sylhet Division won the toss and elected to bat.

17–20 October 2021
Scorecard

Rangpur Division	v	Khulna Division
257 (103.1 overs); Jahid Javed 40 (123); Mehidy Hasan 6/90 (41.1 overs)		260 (89.3 overs); Anamul Haque 84 (164); Suhrawadi Shuvo 6/87 (35.3 overs)
266/8 (80 overs); Jahid Javed 101 (185); Nahidul Islam 3/56 (17 overs)

Match drawn
Sylhet International Cricket Stadium, Sylhet
Umpires: Imran Parvez and Gazi Sohel
Player of the match: Mehidy Hasan (Khulna Division)

- Rangpur Division won the toss and elected to bat.

24–27 October 2021
Scorecard

Dhaka Division	v	Rangpur Division
394 (127.5 overs); Abdul Mazid 110 (188); Mukidul Islam 3/77 (21.5 overs)		321 (116.5 overs); Ariful Haque 98 (118); Shuvagata Hom 4/74 (30 overs)
203/9d (67 overs); Shuvagata Hom 51* (29); Mukidul Islam 3/38 (16 overs)		75/3 (30 overs); Jahid Javed 26 (80); Nazmul Islam 3/29 (13 overs)

Match drawn
Sylhet International Cricket Stadium, Sylhet
Umpires: Asadur Rahman and Gazi Sohel
Player of the match: Abdul Mazid (Dhaka Division)

- Dhaka Division won the toss and elected to bat.
- Anamul Haque (Dhaka Division) made his first-clàss debut.

24–27 October 2021
Scorecard

Khulna Division	v	Sylhet Division
196 (65 overs); Anamul Haque 55 (143); Rejaur Rahman Raja 3/31 (13 overs)		172 (90.1 overs); Jaker Ali 40 (127); Al-Amin Hossain 3/46 (18 overs)
178 (45.5 overs); Nahidul Islam 48 (78); Rejaur Rahman Raja 5/51 (12.2 overs)		205/6 (84.4 overs); Amite Hasan 41 (108); Al-Amin Hossain 2/44 (18 overs)

Sylhet Division won by 4 wickets
Sylhet International Cricket Stadium Academy Ground, Sylhet
Umpires: Ali Arman and Masudur Rahman
Player of the match: Rejaur Rahman Raja (Sylhet Division)

- Sylhet Division won the toss and elected to field.
- Raihan Uddin (Khulna Division) made his first-class debut.

31 October–3 November 2021
Scorecard

Khulna Division	v	Dhaka Division
419 (141.3 overs); Nahidul Islam 175 (256); Nazmul Islam 4/138 (50.3 overs)		231 (111.2 overs); Abdul Mazid 52 (111); Raihan Uddin 6/96 (34 overs)
		161 (112.5 overs) (f/o); Saif Hassan 44 (89); Mehidy Hasan 6/41 (42.5 overs)

Khulna Division won by an innings and 27 runs
Sylhet International Cricket Stadium Academy Ground, Sylhet
Umpires: Morshed Ali Khan and Imran Parvez
Player of the match: Nahidul Islam (Khulna Division)

- Khulna Division won the toss and elected to bat.
- Mrittunjoy Chowdhury (Khulna Division) made his first-class debut.

31 October–3 November 2021
Scorecard

Sylhet Division	v	Rangpur Division
113 (51 overs); Sayem Alam 36 (121); Robiul Haque 4/26 (13 overs)		266 (101.5 overs); Myshukur Rahaman 72 (203); Shahanur Rahman 3/40 (24.5 overs)
292 (119.2 overs); Amite Hasan 170* (385); Mukidul Islam 4/84 (25 overs)		140/4 (42.5 overs); Naeem Islam 50* (80); Enamul Haque 2/32 (12 overs)

Rangpur Division won by 6 wickets
Sylhet International Cricket Stadium, Sylhet
Umpires: Shafiuddin Ahmed and Ali Arman
Player of the match: Amite Hasan (Sylhet Division)

- Rangpur Division won the toss and elected to field.

7–10 November 2021
Scorecard

Dhaka Division	v	Sylhet Division
123 (50.3 overs); Mahidul Islam Ankon 64 (124); Nasum Ahmed 7/43 (18 overs)		265 (104.1 overs); Sayem Alam 78 (177); Nazmul Islam 5/72 (36.4 overs)
243 (109.3 overs); Abdul Mazid 59 (145); Nasum Ahmed 5/70 (39.3 overs)		98 (47.2 overs); Rejaur Rahman Raja 20* (49); Nazmul Islam 4/43 (23.2 overs)

Dhaka Division won by 3 runs
Sylhet International Cricket Stadium, Sylhet
Umpires: Tanvir Ahmed and Shyful Islam
Player of the match: Nazmul Islam (Dhaka Division)

- Sylhet Division won the toss and elected to field.
- Rubel Mia (Dhaka Division) made his first-class debut.

7–10 November 2021
Scorecard

Khulna Division	v	Rangpur Division
257 (91.3 overs); Imrul Kayes 76 (183); Suhrawadi Shuvo 4/69 (28.3 overs)		222 (63 overs); Ariful Haque 66 (81); Mrittunjoy Chowdhury 5/62 (16 overs)
212 (85.2 òvers); Amit Majumder 55 (224); Nasir Hossain 4/35 (23 overs)		248/7 (93.4 overs); Tanbir Hayder 74 (149); Mehidy Hasan 2/78 (35.4 overs)

Rangpur Division won by 3 wickets
Sylhet International Cricket Stadium Academy Ground, Sylhet
Umpires: Morshed Ali Khan and Sharfuddoula
Player of the match: Ariful Haque (Rangpur Division)

- Khulna Division won the toss and elected to bat.

14–17 November 2021
Scorecard

Dhaka Division	v	Rangpur Division
371 (119.5 overs); Nadif Chowdhury 82 (129); Mukidul Islam 3/60 (21 overs)		222/6d (55.3 overs); Nasir Hossain 49 (64); Sumon Khan 2/33 (12 overs)
157/3 (44 overs); Abdul Mazid 61 (119); Tanbir Hayder 2/33 (7 overs)

Match drawn
Bangladesh Krira Shikkha Protisthan No 4 Ground, Savar
Umpires: Sohrab Hossain and Imran Parvez
Player of the match: Tanbir Hayder (Rangpur Division)

- Rangpur Division won the toss and elected to field.

14–17 November 2021
Scorecard

Sylhet Division	v	Khulna Division
132 (44.4 overs); Jaker Ali 36 (87); Al-Amin Hossain 5/34 (14.4 overs)		183 (53 overs); Nahidul Islam 64 (108); Abu Jayed 4/27 (13 overs)
294 (101.5 overs); Amite Hasan 63 (106); Al-Amin Hossain 4/82 (27 overs)		13/1 (2 overs); Abdul Halim 11* (9); Shahanur Rahman 1/10 (1 over)

Match drawn
Bangladesh Krira Shikkha Protisthan No 3 Ground, Savar
Umpires: Manjurul Islam and Masudur Rahman
Player of the match: Al-Amin Hossain (Khulna Division)

- Khulna Division won the toss and elected to field.
- Abdul Halim (Sylhet Division) replaced Masum Khan as concussion substitute.

21–24 November 2021
Scorecard

Dhaka Division	v	Khulna Division
335 (118.1 overs); Mahidul Islam Ankon 92 (190); Soumya Sarkar 3/36 (21 overs)		213 (57.4 overs); Soumya Sarkar 65 (94); Shuvagata Hom 7/48 (18.4 overs)
256/8d (67.5 overs); Rony Talukdar 87 (91); Mohammad Mithun 7/75 (20.5 overs)		199 (98.1 overs); Nahidul Islam 40 (109); Taibur Rahman 5/40 (17.1 overs)

Dhaka Division won by 179 runs
Bangladesh Krira Shikkha Protisthan No 3 Ground, Savar
Umpires: Habibur Rahman and Mahfuzur Rahman
Player of the match: Shuvagata Hom (Dhaka Division)

- Dhaka Division won the toss and elected to bat.
- Ziaur Rahman (Khulna Division) replaced Anamul Haque as concussion substitute.

21–24 November 2021
Scorecard

Rangpur Division	v	Sylhet Division
393 (114.3 overs); Myshukur Rahaman 157 (316); Jaynul Islam 3/75 (20 overs)		540 (175.1 overs); Amite Hasan 186 (422); Robiul Haque 3/82 (24)
196/5 (47 overs); Nasir Hossain 75* (120); Shahanur Rahman 3/93 (17 overs)

Match drawn
Bangladesh Krira Shikkha Protisthan No 4 Ground, Savar
Umpires: Imran Parvez and Asadur Rahman
Player of the match: Amite Hasan (Sylhet Division)

- Sylhet Division won the toss and elected to field.
- Jaynul Islam (Sylhet Division) made his first-class debut.

=== Tier 2 ===
Points table

Team	Pld	W	L	D	A	Pts
Chittagong Division	6	2	2	2	0	31.60
Barisal Division	6	2	1	3	0	29.14
Rajshahi Division	6	1	1	4	0	23.97
Dhaka Metropolis	6	0	1	5	0	19.12

- Top placed team promoted to Tier 1 for 2022–23 National Cricket League.

17–20 October 2021
Scorecard

Rajshahi Division	v	Chittagong Division
166 (41.3 overs); Towhid Hridoy 68 (79); Nayeem Hasan 4/42 (9.3 overs)		349 (100 overs); Yasir Ali 129 (198); Sunzamul Islam 5/99 (29 overs)
259 (99 overs); Towhid Hridoy 68 (148); Nayeem Hasan 4/61 (22 overs)		78/6 (24.1 overs); Yasir Ali 38* (39); Sunzamul Islam 4/42 (12.1 overs)

Chittagong Division won by 4 wickets
Zohur Ahmed Chowdhury Stadium, Chittagong
Umpires: Tanvir Ahmed and Mozahiduzzaman
Player of the match: Yasir Ali (Chittagong Division)

- Chittagong Division won the toss and elected to field.

17–20 October 2021
Scorecard

Dhaka Metropolis	v	Barisal Division
239 (82.5 overs); Shadman Islam 75 (145); Tanvir Islam 6/78 (28.5 overs)		241 (86 overs); Salman Hossain 69 (180); Sharifullah 5/34 (23 overs)
25/0 (13 overs); Rakin Ahmed 13* (31)

Match drawn
Sheikh Kamal International Stadium, Cox's Bazar
Umpires: Shyful Islam and Sharfuddoula
Player of the match: Sharifullah (Dhaka Metropolis)

- Barisal Division won the toss and elected to field.

24–27 October 2021
Scorecard

Barisal Division	v	Chittagong Division
146 (58.3 overs); Rafsan Al Mahmud 60 (142); Hasan Murad 5/26 (18.3 overs)		87 (29.3 overs); Irfan Sukkur 20 (16); Monir Hossain 5/15 (9 overs)
139 (36 overs); Monir Hossain 30 (26); Nayeem Hasan 5/74 (16 overs)		120 (50 overs); Parvez Hossain Emon 46 (122); Monir Hossain 3/33 (17 overs)

Barisal Division won by 78 runs
Zohur Ahmed Chowdhury Stadium, Chittagong
Umpires: Tanvir Ahmed and Mozahiduzzaman

- Barisal Division won the toss and elected to bat.

24–27 October 2021
Scorecard

Rajshahi Division	v	Dhaka Metropolis
252 (82.5 overs); Tanzid Hasan 77 (105); Sharifullah 5/70 (24.5 overs)		339 (107.1 overs); Shadman Islam 79 (128); Taijul Islam 4/115 (38 overs)
184/4 (70.2 overs); Najmul Hossain Shanto 103* (199); Sharifullah 2/46 (24 overs)

Match drawn
Sheikh Kamal International Stadium, Cox's Bazar
Umpires: Habibur Rahman and Sharfuddoula
Player of the match: Sharifullah (Dhaka Metropolis)

- Rajshahi Division won the toss and elected to bat.

31 October–3 November 2021
Scorecard

Chittagong Division	v	Dhaka Metropolis
445/9d (134.1 overs); Mahmudul Hasan Joy 112 (195); Shohidul Islam 3/66 (25 overs)		460 (127.4 overs); Shadman Islam 132 (228); Hasan Murad 4/106 (30.4 overs)
228/5 (63 overs); Pinak Ghosh 83 (132); Sharifullah 3/99 (31 overs)

Match drawn
Bangladesh Krira Shikkha Protisthan No 3 Ground, Savar
Umpires: Mozahiduzzaman and Mahfuzur Rahman
Player of the match: Shadman Islam (Dhaka Metropolis)

- Chittagong Division won the toss and elected to bat.
- Munim Shahriar (Dhaka Metropolis) made his first-class debut.
- Munim Shahriar (Dhaka Metropolis) replaced Al-Amin as concussion substitute.

31 October–3 November 2021
Scorecard

Barisal Division	v	Rajshahi Division
404 (102.3 overs); Sohag Gazi 113 (95); Taijul Islam 4/125 (37 overs)		441 (136.2 overs); Farhad Hossain 108* (267); Monir Hossain 5/107 (32.2 overs)
295 (100.5 overs); Fazle Mahmud 76 (214); Taijul Islam 6/95 (42 overs)		2/0 (2 overs); Taijul Islam 1* (7)

Match drawn
Sheikh Kamal International Stadium, Cox's Bazar
Umpires: Sohrab Hossain and Shyful Islam
Player of the match: Farhad Hossain (Rajshahi Division)

- Barisal Division won the toss and elected bat.
- Nahid Rana (Rajshahi Division) made his first-class debut.

7–10 November 2021
Scorecard

Barisal Division	v	Chittagong Division
236 (72.4 overs); Fazle Mahmud 76 (105); Noman Chowdhury 3/29 (14.4 overs)		443 (126.1 overs); Mahmudul Hasan Joy 121 (211); Monir Hossain 4/129 (41.1 overs)
134 (35 overs); Sohag Gazi 25 (14); Nayeem Hasan 4/10 (5 overs)

Chittagong Division won by an innings and 73 runs
Bangladesh Krira Shikkha Protisthan No 3 Ground, Savar
Umpires: Muhammad Kamruzzaman and Gazi Sohel
Player of the match: Mahmudul Hasan Joy (Chittagong Division)

- Barisal Division won the toss and elected to bat.

7–10 November 2021
Scorecard

Rajshahi Division	v	Dhaka Metropolis
232 (65.5 overs); Farhad Reza 60 (104); Shohidul Islam 7/48 (15.5 overs)		398 (113.5 overs); Shamsur Rahman 89 (157); Sunzamul Islam 4/124 (37 overs)
433/8 (147 overs); Tanzid Hasan 145 (171); Rakibul Hasan 3/46 (22 overs)

Match drawn
Bangladesh Krira Shikkha Protisthan No 4 Ground, Savar
Umpires: Mahfuzur Rahman and Masudur Rahman
Player of the match: Shohidul Islam (Dhaka Metropolis)

- Dhaka Metropolis won the toss and elected to field.
- Minhajul Abedin and Aks Swadhin (Dhaka Metropolis) both made their first-class debuts.

14–17 November 2021
Scorecard

Dhaka Metropolis	v	Barisal Division
87 (30.1 overs); Zahiduzzaman 40 (53); Islamul Ahsan 4/19 (13 overs)		348/9d (124 overs); Salman Hossain 152* (344); Aks Swadhin 3/85 (22 overs)
325 (108.4 overs Al-Amin 70 (145); Ruyel Miah 4/110 (27.4 overs)		65/3 (24.4 overs); Abu Sayeem 35* (78); Rayan Rahman 1/0 (2 overs)

Barisal Division won by 7 wickets
Sylhet International Cricket Stadium Academy Ground, Sylhet
Umpires: Shafiuddin Ahmed and Mozahiduzzaman
Player of the match: Salman Hossain (Barisal Division)

- Dhaka Metropolis won the toss and elected to bat.
- Shahbaz Chouhan and Rayan Rahman (Dhaka Metropolis) both made their first-class debuts.

14–17 November 2021
Scorecard

Rajshahi Division	v	Chittagong Division
194 (54.4 overs); Farhad Reza 54 (49); Nayeem Hasan 5/42 (19.4 overs)		119 (51.2 overs); Pinak Ghosh 30 (69); Sunzamul Islam 6/43 (19 overs)
338/8d (77.1 overs); Pritom Kumar 117 (163); Hasan Murad 5/96 (27 overs)		247 (73 overs); Pinak Ghosh 102 (189); Sunzamul Islam 4/89 (28 overs)

Rajshahi Division won by 166 runs
Sylhet International Cricket Stadium, Sylhet
Umpires: Ishtiaq Ahmed and Morshed Ali Khan
Player of the match: Sunzamul Islam (Rajshahi Division)

- Chittagong Division won the toss and elected to field.
- Shahin Alam (Chittagong Division) made his first-class debut.

21–24 November 2021
Scorecard

Chittagong Division	v	Dhaka Metropolis
223 (71.1 overs); Mahmudul Hasan Joy 83 (116); Sharifullah 4/62 (22 overs)		258 (90.1 overs); Al-Amin 55 (90); Hasan Murad 3/53 (22 overs)
360 (136.2 overs); Shahadat Hossain 159 (306); Iftekhar Sajjad 5/76 (30 overs)		82/4 (24.3 overs); Zahiduzzaman 37 (72); Hasan Murad 3/27 (11.3 overs)

Match drawn
Sylhet International Cricket Stadium, Sylhet
Umpires: Shafiuddin Ahmed and Muhammad Kamruzzaman
Player of the match: Shahadat Hossain (Chittagong Division)

- Chittagong Division won the toss and elected to bat.

21–24 November 2021
Scorecard

Barisal Division	v	Rajshahi Division
333 (134 overs); Fazle Mahmud 188 (356); Mohimenul Khan 3/42 (19.3 overs)		421 (127.4 overs); Farhad Reza 99 (111); Ruyel Miah 5/120 (28 overs)
286/4 (75.2 overs); Abu Sayeem 87 (191); Mohimenul Khan 2/77 (24 overs)

Match drawn
Sylhet International Cricket Stadium Academy Ground, Sylhet
Umpires: Ali Arman and Mozahiduzzaman
Player of the match: Fazle Mahmud (Barisal Division)

- Rajshahi Division won the toss and elected to field.

== See also ==
- 2021–22 Bangladesh Premier League
- 2021–22 Bangladesh Cricket League
