= 2022–23 National Cricket League =

Cricket tournament

2022 National Cricket League
- Dates: 10 October – 17 November 2022
- Administrator: Bangladesh Cricket Board
- Cricket format: First-class
- Tournament format: Double round-robin
- Champions: Rangpur Division (2nd title)
- Participants: 8
- Matches: 24
- Most runs: Tier 1: Zakir Hasan (442); Tier 2: Jahurul Islam (395)
- Most wickets: Tier 1: Sumon Khan (33); Tier 2: Nahid Rana (32)

The 2022 National Cricket League was the twenty-fourth edition of the National Cricket League (NCL), a first-class cricket competition held in Bangladesh. The eight teams taking part were placed into two tiers, with Chittagong Division getting promoted to Tier 1 after their victory in Tier 2 of the 2021–22 season, replacing Khulna Division who were relegated. The tournament started on 10 October 2022, and concluded on 17 November 2022 with Rangpur Division winning their second NCL title. This edition of the tournament was the first to use the Dukes cricket ball, rather than the SG ball used in previous editions.

== Points table ==
=== Tier 1 ===
Pos	Team	Pld	W	D	L	Pts	Relegation
1	Rangpur Division (C)	6	4	1	1	38	
2	Sylhet Division	6	2	2	2	21	
3	Dhaka Division	6	2	1	3	19	
4	Chittagong Division (R)	6	1	2	3	12	Relegated to Tier 2

Source: ESPNcricinfo
(C) Champion; (R) Relegated

=== Tier 2 ===
Pos	Team	Pld	W	D	L	Pts	Promotion
1	Dhaka Metropolis (C, P)	6	4	0	2	35	Promoted to Tier 1
2	Rajshahi Division	6	2	2	2	22	
3	Khulna Division	6	2	1	3	20	
4	Barisal Division	6	2	1	3	19	

Source: ESPNcricinfo
(C) Champion; (P) Promoted

== Fixtures ==
=== Tier 1 ===
10–13 October 2022
Scorecard

Rangpur Division	v	Dhaka Division
92 (36.2 overs); Ariful Haque 34* (83); Sumon Khan 5/25 (11.2 overs)		210 (73.1 overs); Nadif Chowdhury 90 (141); Musfik Hasan 5/48 (19.1 overs)
56 (26.1 overs); Myshukur Rahaman 12 (47); Salauddin Sakil 4/16 (9.1 overs)

Dhaka Division won by an innings and 62 runs
Sher-e-Bangla National Cricket Stadium, Dhaka
Umpires: Mahfuzur Rahman and Sharfuddoula
Player of the match: Sumon Khan (Dhaka Division)

- Dhaka Division won the toss and elected to field.
- Ripon Mondol (Dhaka Division), Musfik Hasan and Abu Hasim (Rangpur Division) all made their first-class debuts.
- Musfik Hasan (Rangpur) took his maiden five-wicket haul in first-class cricket.

10–13 October 2022
Scorecard

Chittagong Division	v	Sylhet Division
141 (80.1 overs); Tamim Iqbal 31 (69); Nabil Samad 5/47 (27.1 overs)		312 (99.5 overs); Zakir Hasan 87 (161); Hasan Murad 8/119 (40.5 overs)
221 (119.3 overs); Sabbir Hossen 55 (176); Naeem Ahmed 5/42 (35 overs)		52/1 (7.5 overs); Towfiq Khan 35* (26); Iftekhar Sajjad 1/8 (3 overs)

Sylhet Division won by 9 wickets
Zohur Ahmed Chowdhury Stadium, Chittagong
Umpires: Shafiuddin Ahmed and Gazi Sohel
Player of the match: Nabil Samad (Sylhet Division)

- Sylhet Division won the toss and elected to field.
- Ahmed Sharif (Chittagong Division), Naeem Ahmed and Abu Bakkar (Sylhet Division) all made their first-class debuts.
- Naeem Ahmed (Sylhet) took his maiden five-wicket haul in first class cricket.

17–20 October 2022
Scorecard

Dhaka Division	v	Sylhet Division
128 (63.1 overs); Rony Talukdar 37 (92); Nabil Samad 5/36 (24 overs)		167 (76.1 overs); Amite Hasan 63 (159); Nazmul Islam 4/53 (27.1 overs)
256 (84.4 overs); Shuvagata Hom 89 (152); Tanzim Hasan Sakib 5/53 (16 overs)		218/6 (65.4 overs); Jaker Ali 51* (46); Sumon Khan 2/22 (7 overs)

Sylhet Division won by 4 wickets
Bangladesh Krira Shikkha Protisthan No 3 Ground, Savar
Umpires: Moniruzzaman and Gazi Sohel
Player of the match: Tanzim Hasan Sakib (Sylhet Division)

- Sylhet Division won the toss and elected to field.
- Tanzim Hasan Sakib (Sylhet) took his maiden five-wicket haul in first-class cricket.

17–20 October 2022
Scorecard

Chittagong Division	v	Rangpur Division
126 (50 overs); Hasan Murad 23 (70); Mukidul Islam 4/33 (17 overs)		222 (73.4 overs); Naeem Islam 51 (146); Hasan Murad 5/46 (16.4 overs)
199 (59 overs); Irfan Sukkur 67 (82); Mukidul Islam 3/41 (17 overs)		107/3 (23.5 overs); Nasir Hossain 45* (44); Nayeem Hasan 2/43 (9 overs)

Rangpur Division won by 7 wickets
Sher-e-Bangla National Cricket Stadium, Dhaka
Umpires: Morshed Ali Khan and Masudur Rahman
Player of the match: Mukidul Islam (Rangpur Division)

- Rangpur Division won the toss and elected to field.
- Abdullah Al Mamun (Rangpur Division) made his first-class debut.

24–27 October 2022
Scorecard

Dhaka Division	v	Chittagong Division
158/5d (59 overs); Taibur Rahman 51* (102); Yeasin Arafat 3/35 (13 overs)		50/2 (22 overs); Parvez Hossain Emon 26* (68); Sumon Khan 1/14 (5 overs)

Match drawn
Shaheed Chandu Stadium, Bogra
Umpires: Shafiuddin Ahmed and Sharfuddoula

- Chittagong Division won the toss and elected to field.

24–27 October 2022
Scorecard

Rangpur Division	v	Sylhet Division
405/7d (125.2 overs); Abdullah Al Mamun 210* (364); Abu Jayed 4/71 (24 overs)		119/2 (21.2 overs); Towfiq Khan 92 (62); Nasir Hossain 1/1 (0.2 overs)

Match drawn
Sylhet International Cricket Stadium, Sylhet
Umpires: Ali Arman and Habibur Rahman
Player of the match: Abdullah Al Mamun (Rangpur Division)

- Sylhet Division won the toss and elected to field.
- Sohel Rana (Rangpur Division) made his first-class debut.
- Abdullah Al Mamun (Rangpur) scored his maiden century in first-class cricket.

31 October–3 November 2022
Scorecard

Dhaka Division	v	Rangpur Division
84 (32.1 overs); Shuvagata Hom 28 (56); Sohel Rana 5/25 (10 overs)		73 (29.4 overs); Ariful Haque 19 (24); Sumon Khan 5/33 (13.4 overs)
199 (54.5 overs); Mahidul Islam Ankon 74 (87); Musfik Hasan 8/73 (17.5 overs)		211/7 (65.3 overs); Suhrawadi Shuvo 72 (148); Salauddin Sakil 3/70 (25 overs)

Rangpur Division won by 3 wickets
Shaheed Chandu Stadium, Bogra
Umpires: Tanvir Ahmed and Asadur Rahman
Player of the match: Musfik Hasan (Rangpur Division)

- Rangpur Division won the toss and elected to field.
- Sohel Rana (Rangpur) took his maiden five-wicket haul in first-class cricket.

31 October–3 November 2022
Scorecard

Sylhet Division	v	Chittagong Division
481/9d (132 overs); Zakir Hasan 213 (318); Hasan Murad 5/187 (47 overs)		237 (107.1 overs); Parvez Hossain Emon 92 (243); Nabil Samad 5/56 (32 overs)
		256/5 (109 overs) (f/o); Pinak Ghosh 62 (102); Nabil Samad 3/107 (50 overs)

Match drawn
Sylhet International Cricket Stadium, Sylhet
Umpires: Moniruzzaman and Sharfuddoula
Player of the match: Zakir Hasan (Sylhet Division)

- Sylhet Division won the toss and elected to bat.

7–10 November 2022
Scorecard

Dhaka Division	v	Sylhet Division
113 (40.2 overs); Mahidul Islam Ankon 41 (63); Enamul Haque 5/33 (12 overs)		76 (19.3 overs); Al-Amin 20 (28); Salauddin Sakil 5/14 (7 overs)
457 (104.3 overs); Abdul Mazid 176 (277); Mohiuddin Tareq 4/114 (27 overs)		161 (53.5 overs); Towfiq Khan 58 (63); Sumon Khan 3/31 (14 overs)

Dhaka Division won by 333 runs
Sylhet International Cricket Stadium, Sylhet
Umpires: Mozahiduzzaman and Masudur Rahman
Player of the match: Abdul Mazid (Dhaka Division)

- Sylhet Division won the toss and elected to field.

7–10 November 2022
Scorecard

Chittagong Division	v	Rangpur Division
100 (53.3 overs); Parvez Hossain Emon 33 (84); Robiul Haque 5/13 (13 overs)		363/7d (124 overs); Naeem Islam 131* (251); Mehedi Hasan 3/74 (26 overs)
263 (104.5 overs); Pinak Ghosh 103 (264); Musfik Hasan 4/60 (19.5 overs)		1/0 (0 overs); Abdullah Al Mamun 0* (1)

Rangpur Division won by 10 wickets
Bangladesh Krira Shikkha Protisthan No 4 Ground, Savar
Umpires: Ali Arman and Shyful Islam
Player of the match: Naeem Islam (Rangpur Division)

- Chittagong Division won the toss and elected to bat.
- Shamim Hossain and Mohiul Islam Patwary (Chittagong Division) both made their first-class debut.

14–17 November 2022
Scorecard

Chittagong Division	v	Dhaka Division
203 (63 overs); Irfan Sukkur 66 (111); Shuvagata Hom 4/21 (10 overs)		198 (45.4 overs); Abdul Mazid 67 (91); Yeasin Arafat 6/71 (15 overs)
249 (87.5 overs); Mahmudul Hasan Joy 73 (144); Salauddin Sakil 4/55 (20 overs)		168/5 (55 overs); Taibur Rahman 71* (147); Hasan Murad 4/64 (24 overs)

Stumps, Day 3
Bangladesh Krira Shikkha Protisthan No 3 Ground, Savar
Umpires: Morshed Ali Khan and Asadur Rahman

- Chittagong Division won the toss and elected to bat.
- Salauddin Sakil (Dhaka) took his maiden five-wicket haul in first-class cricket.

14–17 November 2022
Scorecard

Sylhet Division	v	Rangpur Division
107 (46.1 overs); Towfiq Khan 16 (33); Sohel Rana 3/21 (9 overs)		188 (57.3 overs); Nasir Hossain 41 (84); Ebadot Hossain 5/38 (20 overs)
168 (49.3 overs); Towfiq Khan 36 (55); Abdullah Al Mamun 4/40 (8 overs)		89/5 (23.3 overs); Mim Mosaddeak 29* (43); Tanzim Hasan Sakib 3/24 (5 overs)

Rangpur Division won by 5 wickets
Shaheed Chandu Stadium, Bogra
Umpires: Mahfuzur Rahman and Sharfuddoula
Player of the match: Abdullah Al Mamun (Rangpur Division)

- Rangpur Division won the toss and elected to field.

=== Tier 2 ===
10–13 October 2022
Scorecard

Khulna Division	v	Dhaka Metropolis
131 (60.1 overs); Nahidul Islam 42 (26); Manik Khan 4/28 (15 overs)		156 (60.1 overs); Sharifullah 25 (55); Salman Hossain 3/36 (11 overs)
191 (70.4 overs); Ziaur Rahman 53 (64); Sharifullah 5/25 (19.4 overs)		168/8 (70 overs); Marshall Ayub 40 (80); Tipu Sultan 2/17 (8 overs)

Dhaka Metropolis won by 2 wickets
Sheikh Abu Naser Stadium, Khulna
Umpires: Tanvir Ahmed and Asadur Rahman
Player of the match: Sharifullah (Dhaka Metropolis)

- Dhaka Metropolis won the toss and elected to field.
- Mahfijul Islam (Dhaka Metropolis), Salman Hossain, and Prantik Nawrose Nabil (Khulna Division) all made their first-class debuts.

10–13 October 2022
Scorecard

Barisal Division	v	Rajshahi Division
281 (91.4 overs); Abu Sayeem 59 (113); Nahid Rana 4/40 (21 overs)		231 (72.2 overs); Pritom Kumar 61 (77); Kamrul Islam Rabbi 4/72 (18 overs)
71/5 (24 overs); Salman Hossain 32 (49); Nahid Rana 2/12 (7 overs)

Match drawn
Shaheed Qamaruzzaman Stadium, Rajshahi
Umpires: Ali Arman and Mozahiduzzaman
Player of the match: Sunzamul Islam (Rajshahi Division)

- Rajshahi Division won the toss and elected to field.
- SM Meherob (Rajshahi Division) made his first-class debut.

17–20 October 2022
Scorecard

Barisal Division	v	Khulna Division
248 (110 overs); Salman Hossain 79 (201); Mahedi Hasan 4/45 (25 overs)		213 (82.1 overs); Nahidul Islam 129 (236); Ruyel Miah 3/52 (15.1 overs)
212 (81.5 overs); Sohag Gazi 73 (69); Tipu Sultan 5/37 (15 overs)		176 (52.3 overs); Imrul Kayes 46 (102); Tanvir Islam 4/78 (19 overs)

Barisal Division won by 71 runs
Sheikh Kamal International Cricket Stadium, Cox's Bazar
Umpires: Tanvir Ahmed and Muhammad Kamruzzaman
Player of the match: Sohag Gazi (Barisal Division)

- Khulna Division won the toss and elected to field.
- Ashiqur Zaman (Khulna Division) made his first-class debut.
- Tipu Sultan (Khulna Division) took his maiden five-wicket haul in first-class cricket.

17–20 October 2022
Scorecard

Dhaka Metropolis	v	Rajshahi Division
134 (55.3 overs); Abu Hider 47 (83); Farhad Reza 3/20 (11 overs)		366 (136.3 overs); Mushfiqur Rahim 110 (246); Asadullah Galib 3/70 (27 overs)
268 (95.3 overs); Marshall Ayub 61 (140); Taijul Islam 6/109 (36.3 overs)		37/0 (13.2 overs); Junaid Siddique 20* (45)

Rajshahi Division won by 10 wickets
Zohur Ahmed Chowdhury Stadium, Chittagong
Umpires: Sohrab Hossain and Mahfuzur Rahman
Player of the match: Mushfiqur Rahim (Rajshahi Division)

- Rajshahi Division won the toss and elected to field.
- Asadullah Galib (Dhaka Metropolis) made his first-class debut.

24–27 October 2022
Scorecard

Khulna Division	v	Rajshahi Division
267 (82.5 overs); Amit Majumder 101 (196); Nahid Rana 3/46 (14.5 overs)		124/1 (38.4 overs); Jahurul Islam 64* (130); Ashiqur Zaman 1/16 (5 overs)

Match drawn
Sylhet International Cricket Stadium Academy Ground, Sylhet
Umpires: Shyful Islam and Masudur Rahman
Player of the match: Amit Majumder (Khulna Division)

- Khulna Division won the toss and elected to bat.
- Jawad Royen (Khulna Division) made his first-class debut.

24–27 October 2022
Scorecard

Dhaka Metropolis	v	Barisal Division
255 (85.5 overs); Marshall Ayub 100 (186); Ruyel Miah 3/33 (16 overs)		165 (55.2 overs); Salman Hossain 76 (129); Abu Hider 5/59 (16 overs)
124 (40.3 overs); Shamsur Rahman 27 (26); Tanvir Islam 5/35 (15 overs)		217/6 (68.5 overs); Rafsan Al Mahmud 71 (141); Rakibul Hasan 5/74 (26 overs)

Barisal Division won by 4 wickets
Shaheed Qamaruzzaman Stadium, Rajshahi
Umpires: Ishtiaq Ahmed and Mozahiduzzaman
Player of the match: Rafsan Al Mahmud (Barisal Division)

- Barisal Division won the toss and elected to field.
- Aich Mollah (Dhaka Metropolis) made his first-class debut.
- Rakibul Hasan (Dhaka Metropolis) took his maiden five-wicket haul in first-class cricket.

31 October–3 November 2022
Scorecard

Khulna Division	v	Dhaka Metropolis
64 (32.2 overs); Ziaur Rahman 17* (43); Aks Swadhin 4/12 (4.2 overs)		118 (39.3 overs); Marshall Ayub 30 (42); Mahedi Hasan 5/44 (14.3 overs)
253 (80 overs); Imran Uzzaman 92 (193); Aminul Islam 3/56 (11 overs)		202/6 (76.4 overs); Shamsur Rahman 65* (152); Mahedi Hasan 5/61 (31 overs)

Dhaka Metropolis won by 4 wickets
Bangladesh Krira Shikkha Protisthan No 3 Ground, Savar
Umpires: Morshed Ali Khan and Mahfuzur Rahman
Player of the match: Sharifullah (Dhaka Metropolis)

- Dhaka Metropolis won the toss and elected to field.

31 October–3 November 2022
Scorecard

Rajshahi Division	v	Barisal Division
508/8d (148.3 overs); Jahurul Islam 177 (312); Mohammad Ashraful 2/54 (16 overs)		273 (78 overs); Sohag Gazi 72 (85); Nahid Rana 5/62 (19 overs)
		167 (58.5 overs) (f/o); Abu Sayeem 56 (166); Shafiqul Islam 4/20 (12 overs)

Rajshahi Division won by an innings and 68 runs
Sheikh Abu Naser Stadium, Khulna
Umpires: Muhammad Kamruzzaman and Gazi Sohel
Player of the match: Jahurul Islam (Rajshahi Division)

- Barisal Division won the toss and elected to field.
- Nahid Rana (Rajshahi Division) took his maiden five-wicket haul in first-class cricket.

7–10 November 2022
Scorecard

Khulna Division	v	Barisal Division
315 (102 overs); Hasanuzzaman 45 (76); Kamrul Islam Rabbi 4/89 (27 overs)		145 (47.2 overs); Sohag Gazi 31 (54); Ashiqur Zaman 3/17 (10 overs)
90/0 (28.2 overs); Hasanuzzaman 56* (71)		256 (80.2 overs) (f/o); Moin Khan 102 (123); Al-Amin Hossain 3/64 (14.2 overs)

Khulna Division won by 10 wickets
Shaheed Qamaruzzaman Stadium, Rajshahi
Umpires: Manjurul Islam and Moniruzzaman
Player of the match: Nahidul Islam (Khulna Division)

- Barisal Division won the toss and elected to field.
- Iftakhar Hossain Ifti (Barisal Division) made his first-class debut.

7–10 November 2022
Scorecard

Rajshahi Division	v	Dhaka Metropolis
252 (82.2 overs); Tanzid Hasan 101 (137); Rakibul Hasan 4/59 (19 overs)		373 (91.2 overs); Mohammad Naim 112 (105); Nahid Rana 5/76 (13 overs)
297 (93.2 overs); Mushfiqur Rahim 97 (155); Sharifullah 4/59 (24.2 overs)		180/8 (38.4 overs); Aich Mollah 51 (51); Nahid Rana 4/51 (11.4 overs)

Dhaka Metropolis won by 2 wickets
Sheikh Kamal International Cricket Stadium, Cox's Bazar
Umpires: Joynal Abedin and Tanvir Ahmed
Player of the match: Sharifullah (Dhaka Metropolis)

- Dhaka Metropolis won the toss and elected to field.
- Mohammad Naim (Dhaka Metropolis) scored his maiden century in first-class cricket.

14–17 November 2022
Scorecard

Khulna Division	v	Rajshahi Division
266 (84.4 overs); Imrul Kayes 100 (189); Nahid Rana 5/63 (14.4 overs)		54 (26.5 overs); Pritom Kumar 13 (27); Soumya Sarkar 4/5 (4.5 overs)
26/1 (4 overs); Amit Majumder 12 (19); Mohor Sheikh 1/10 (2 overs)		236 (64 overs) (f/o); Tanzid Hasan 126* (153); Ashiqur Zaman 5/40 (14 overs)

Khulna Division won by 9 wickets
Sheikh Abu Naser Stadium, Khulna
Umpires: Muhammad Kamruzzaman and Gazi Sohel
Player of the match: Soumya Sarkar (Khulna Division)

- Rajshahi Division won the toss and elected to field.
- Ashiqur Zaman (Rajshahi Division) took his maiden five-wicket haul in first-class cricket.

14–17 November 2022
Scorecard

Barisal Division	v	Dhaka Metropolis
211 (75.3 overs); Fazle Mahmud 56 (136); Rakibul Hasan 4/60 (18.3 overs)		222 (57.2 overs); Rakibul Hasan 63 (63); Salman Hossain 5/44 (15 overs)
200 (68.4 overs); Mohammad Ashraful 53 (98); Asadullah Galib 6/66 (17.4 overs)		191/3 (48.2 overs); Shadman Islam 64 (92); Islamul Ahsan 1/10 (5 overs)

Dhaka Metropolis won by 7 wickets
Sylhet International Cricket Stadium, Sylhet
Umpires: Shafiuddin Ahmed and Shyful Islam
Player of the match: Rakibul Hasan (Dhaka Metropolis)

- Dhaka Metropolis won the toss and elected to field.
- Asadullah Gaib (Dhaka Metropolis) took his maiden five-wicket haul in first-class cricket.
