= List of Barisal Division cricketers =

This presents a complete list, in alphabetical order, of cricketers who have played for the Barisal Division in first-class, List A or Twenty20 matches since the team was formed ahead of the 1999–2000 season for the first National Cricket League (NCL) competition. Complying with other club lists, details are the player's name followed by his years active as a Barisal player, current players to the end of the 2015–16 season.

This list excludes players who appeared for the team in 1999–2000 only. This is because the NCL was not a first-class competition in its opening season. Some players (for example, Habibul Bashar) played for Barisal that season and then played in first-class cricket for other teams in later seasons.

== A ==
- Abid Hossain (2011–12)
- Abul Bashar (2004–05 to 2009–10)
- Abu Sayeem (2014–15 to 2015–16)
- Adil Ahmed (2001–02)
- Ahsanullah Hasan (2000–01 to 2006–07)
- Al-Amin Abdullah (2000–01)
- Al-Amin Hossain (2014–15 to 2015–16)
- Ali Arman (2002–03 to 2007–08)
- Anhur Newaz (2009–10)
- Anisur Rahman (2001–02 to 2005–06)
- Arafat Salahuddin (2003–04 to 2013)
- Arafat Sunny (2009–10)
- Arif Hossain (2000–01 to 2005–06)
- Ariful Haque (2006–07 to 2010–11)
- Ashfaq Ali (2000–01 to 2001–02)
- Asif Ahmed (2009–10 to 2010–11)
- Avishek Mitra (2014–15)
- Awlad Hossain (2001–02)

== B ==
- Bikash Sharma (2004–05 to 2012–13)

== D ==
- Debabrata Barua Paul (2002–03 to 2007–08)
- Deen Mohammad (2001–02)

== F ==
- Fariduddin (2012–13 to 2014–15)
- Fazle Mahmud (2003–04 to 2015–16)

== G ==
- Golam Kabir (2011–12 to 2015–16)
- Golam Kibria (2009–10)
- Golam Rabbani (2005–06)

== H ==
- Hannan Sarkar (1999–2000 to 2010–11)
- Harunur Rashid (2001–02)
- Humayun Kabir (2004–05 to 2007–08)
- [Hafizur Rahman]

(Cricketer) (2023/24 to present)

== I ==
- Iftekhar Nayem (2006–07 to 2013–14)
- Ilias Miah (2001–02 to 2002–03)
- Imran Ahmed (2000–01 to 2009–10)
- Ishraq Sonet (2001–02 to 2011–12)
- Ishtiaq Ahmed (2000–01)
- Islamul Ahsan (2011–12 to 2014–15)

== J ==
- Jahidur Rahman (2004–05)
- Jamal Faisal (2003–04)
- Javed Omar (2011–12)
- Jewel Khan (2001–02)
- Jupiter Ghosh (2011–12)

== K ==
- Kafi Khan (2002–03)
- Kamal Ahmed (1999–2000 to 2002–03)
- Kamaluddin (2003–04)
- Kamrul Ahsan (2001–02)
- Kamrul Islam Imon (2007–08 to 2009–10)
- Kamrul Islam Rabbi (2008–09 to 2015–16)
- Jeevantha Kulatunga (Sri Lanka; 2009–10)

== L ==
- Lablur Rahman (2006–07)

== M ==
- Mafizul Islam (2001–02)
- Mafizur Rahman Roshi (2003–04)
- Mahmudul Haque (2013–14)
- Mahmudul Hasan (2009–10)
- Marshall Ayub (2005–06)
- Mashiur Rahman (1999–2000 to 2001–02)
- Masudur Rahman (2001–02)
- Mehdi Hasan (2006–07 to 2011–12)
- Mizanur Rahman (1999–2000 to 2000–01)
- Mohammad Azim (2009–10)
- Mohammad Manik (2013–14 to 2014–15)
- Mohammad Mostadir (2003–04)
- Mohammad Sajib (2009–10 to 2015–16)
- Mohammad Sayeem (2001–02)
- Mohammad Sharif (2004–05)
- Mohiuddin Belal (2011–12 to 2012–13)
- Moinul Islam (2013–14)
- Moinuzzaman (1999–2000 to 2002–03)
- Monir Hossain (2005–06 to 2015–16)
- Moniruzzaman (2001–02 to 2002–03)
- Monowar Hossain (2008–09)
- Morshed Hossain (2001–02)
- Mosaddek Hossain (2014–15 to 2015–16)
- Mosharraf Hossain (2004–05)
- Muktar Ali (2006–07)

== N ==
- Nadif Chowdhury (2002–03 to 2005–06)
- Nahidul Haque (2002–03 to 2004–05)
- Narayan Chandra (2000–01)
- Nasir Hossain (2008–09)
- Nasiruddin Faruque (2003–04 to 2013)
- Nasum Ahmed (2014–15)
- Nayan Kumar (2001–02 to 2004–05)
- Nazimuddin (2009–10)
- Nuruzzaman (2010–11 to 2015–16)

== P ==
- Pijush Krishna (1999–2000 to 2002–03)
- Pinak Ghosh (2015–16)
- Prosenjit Joy (2002–03 to 2007–08)

== R ==
- Rabiul Karim (2008–09)
- Raisul Islam (2006–07 to 2008–09)
- Bhanuka Rajapaksa (Sri Lanka; 2009–10)
- Rajat Roy (2001–02)
- Ranjan Das (2003–04)
- Raqibul Hasan (2004–05 to 2010–11)
- Rashedur Rahman (2000–01 to 2003–04)
- Razib Kumar (2004–05)
- Reazur Rahman (2012–13)
- Refatuzzaman (2011–12)
- Riazul Karim (2011–12)
- Robindranath Sen (2002–03 to 2003–04)
- Robiul Islam (2009–10)
- Rony Talukdar (2008–09 to 2009–10)

== S ==
- Sabbir Rahman (2009–10)
- Sadik Hasan (2002–03)
- Safaiat Islam (2000–01 to 2001–02)
- Saghir Hossain (2009–10)
- Sahadat Hossain (2000–01)
- Saif Hassan (2014–15)
- Sajib Datta (2008–09)
- Sajib Miah (2003–04)
- Sajidul Islam (2005–06 to 2009–10)
- Saleh Ahmed (1999–2000 to 2001–02)
- Saleh Ahmed (2014–15 to 2015–16)
- Salman Hossain (2011–12 to 2015–16)
- Sanwar Hossain (2001–02)
- Saqib Chowdhury (2004–05)
- Selim Shahed (2001–02)
- Shafaq Al Zabir (2009–10 to 2012–13)
- Shahidul Bashar (2011–12)
- Shahidul Islam (2001–02)
- Shohidul Islam (2014–15)
- Shahin Hossain (2001–02 to 2015–16)
- Shahnawaz Kabir (2000–01 to 2004–05)
- Shahriar Nafees (2005–06 to 2015–16)
- Shahriar Ripon (2012–13)
- Shamimul Islam (2001–02)
- Shamsul Islam (2011–12)
- Shazzad Hossain (2012–13)
- Siddiqur Rahman (2000–01)
- Sohag Gazi (2009–10 to 2015–16)
- Sumon Saha (2007–08)
- Syed Rasel (2009–10 to 2013)

== T ==
- Talha Jubair (2007–08 to 2008–09)
- Taposh Ghosh (2006–07 to 2007–08)
- Tariq Ahmed (2010–11)
- Kazi Tariqul Islam (2006–07)
- Mohammad Tariqul Islam (1999–2000 to 2011–12)
- Tashriqul Islam (1999–2000 to 2000–01)
- Towhid Hossain (2000–01 to 2005–06)
- Towhidul Islam (2010–11 to 2015–16)

== U ==
- Uttam Sarkar (2008–09)

== Z ==
- Zakaria Masud (2012–13 to 2013–14)
- Ziaur Rahman (2009–10)
