= 2017–18 National Cricket League =

Cricket tournament

- Dates: 15 September 2017 – 23 December 2017
- Administrator: Bangladesh Cricket Board
- Cricket format: First-class
- Tournament format: Double round-robin
- Champions: Khulna Division (6th title)
- Participants: 8
- Matches: 24
- Most runs: Anamul Haque (619)
- Most wickets: Farhad Reza (21); Nihaduzzaman (21)

The 2017–18 National Cricket League was the nineteenth edition of the National Cricket League, a first-class cricket competition that was held in Bangladesh. The tournament started on 15 September 2017, with eight teams placed into two tiers. The top team in Tier 2 were promoted to Tier 1 for the next season, with the bottom team in Tier 1 relegated to Tier 2. Khulna Division were the defending champions.

There was a two-month break in the tournament, starting in mid-October, while the Bangladesh Premier League took place. Rajshahi Division were promoted to Tier 1 before the final round of fixtures were played. Khulna Division retained their title when they beat Dhaka Division by an innings and 49 runs in their final match. Dhaka Division were also relegated to Tier 2 for the next season.

== Fixtures ==
=== Tier 1 ===
Points table

Team	Pld	W	L	D	A	Pts
Khulna Division	6	2	0	4	0	25
Rangpur Division	6	0	0	6	0	12
Barisal Division	6	0	1	5	0	10
Dhaka Division	6	0	1	5	0	10

- 2017–18 Champions
- Bottom placed team relegated to Tier 2 for 2018–19 National Cricket League.

15–18 September 2017
Scorecard

Dhaka Division	v	Barisal Division
309/2 (90 overs); Rony Talukdar 121 (195); Monir Hossain 1/73 (26 overs)

Match drawn
Sheikh Kamal International Stadium, Cox's Bazar
Umpires: Gazi Sohel and Mahfuzur Rahman

- Dhaka Division won the toss and elected to bat.
- No play was possible on days 1, 3 and 4 due to rain and a wet outfield.
- Rafsan Al Mahmud and Tanvir Islam (Barisal Division) both made their first-class debuts.

15–18 September 2017
Scorecard

Rangpur Division	v	Khulna Division
471 (120.3 overs); Naeem Islam 135 (249); Al-Amin Hossain 4/102 (26 overs)		495/9d (138.4 overs); Anamul Haque 216 (356); Nasir Hossain 5/70 (20 overs)
37/4 (8 overs); Jahid Javed 27* (29); Mashrafe Mortaza 3/12 (4 overs)

Match drawn
Sheikh Abu Naser Stadium, Khulna
Umpires: Nadir Shah and Sharfuddoula
Player of the match: Anamul Haque (Khulna Division)

- Khulna Division won the toss and elected to field.
- Ashikuzzaman (Khulna Division) made his first-class debut.
- Anamul Haque (Khulna Division) scored his maiden double-century in first-class cricket.

22–25 September 2017
Scorecard

Rangpur Division	v	Dhaka Division
237/2d (52.3 overs); Suhrawadi Shuvo 56 (53); Sabuj Barman 1/46 (10.3 overs)		150/3 (44 overs); Rony Talukdar 60 (96); Suhrawadi Shuvo 2/28 (13 overs)

Match drawn
Shaheed Chandu Stadium, Bogra
Umpires: Mahfuzur Rahman and Nadir Shah

- Rangpur Division won the toss and elected to bat.
- No play was possible on days 1 and 2 due to rain.
- Sabuj Barman (Dhaka Division) made his first-class debut.

22–25 September 2017
Scorecard

Khulna Division	v	Barisal Division
444 (124.3 overs); Mahedi Hasan 177 (290); Monir Hossain 7/85 (34.3 overs)		258 (80 overs); Nuruzzaman 101* (175); Al-Amin Hossain 4/72 (18 overs)
216/7d (49 overs); Tushar Imran 57* (62); Sohag Gazi 3/78 (14 overs)		163 (61 overs); Fazle Mahmud 88 (171); Abdur Razzak 5/32 (17 overs)

Khulna Division won by 239 runs
Sheikh Abu Naser Stadium, Khulna
Umpires: Mozahiduzzaman and Tanvir Ahmed
Player of the match: Mahedi Hasan (Khulna Division)

- Khulna Division won the toss and elected to bat.
- Moinul Islam (Khulna Division) made his first-class debut.
- Abdur Razzak (Khulna Division) took his 25th five-wicket haul in first-class cricket.
- Nuruzzaman (Barisal Division) scored his maiden first-class century.

29 September–2 October 2017
Scorecard

Rangpur Division	v	Barisal Division
61/1 (16.2 overs); Suhrawadi Shuvo 34* (44); Kamrul Islam Rabbi 1/20 (6 overs)

Match drawn
Shaheed Kamruzzaman Stadium, Rajshahi
Umpires: Anisur Rahman and Mahfuzur Rahman

- Rangpur Division won the toss and elected to bat.
- No play was possible on days 1, 2 and 4 due to rain.
- Mim Mosaddeak (Rangpur Division) made his first-class debut.

29 September–2 October 2017
Scorecard

Dhaka Division	v	Khulna Division
519/9d (147 overs); Nadif Chowdhury 166 (239); Mahedi Hasan 3/103 (30 overs)		247 (71 overs); Ziaur Rahman 104 (116); Nazmul Islam 4/79 (25 overs)
		180/4 (90 overs) (f/o); Tushar Imran 63 (189); Mosharraf Hossain 2/16 (16 overs)

Match drawn
Zohur Ahmed Chowdhury Stadium, Chittagong
Umpires: Nadir Shah and Sharfuddoula

- Dhaka Division won the toss and elected to bat.

6–9 October 2017
Scorecard

Dhaka Division	v	Barisal Division
250 (102.1 overs); Rony Talukdar 68 (224); Salman Hossain 4/38 (19 overs)		299 (102 overs); Sohag Gazi 73 (77); Shuvagata Hom 4/62 (23 overs)
110/3 (38 overs); Raqibul Hasan 39* (96); Sohag Gazi 1/11 (4 overs)

Match drawn
Sheikh Abu Naser Stadium, Khulna
Umpires: Masudur Rahman and Tanvir Ahmed
Player of the match: Nuruzzaman (Barisal Division)

- Dhaka Division won the toss and elected to bat.

6–9 October 2017
Scorecard

Khulna Division	v	Rangpur Division
218 (58.4 overs); Anamul Haque 61 (98); Ariful Haque 4/49 (15 overs)		317/9d (80.4 overs); Jahid Javed 115 (217); Ziaur Rahman 3/29 (6.4 overs)
141/1 (43 overs); Mahedi Hasan 88* (133); Tanbir Hayder 1/11 (7.4 overs)

Match drawn
Shaheed Kamruzzaman Stadium, Rajshahi
Umpires: Anisur Rahman and Nadir Shah
Player of the match: Jahid Javed (Rangpur Division)

- Rangpur Division won the toss and elected to field.

13–16 October 2017
Scorecard

Rangpur Division	v	Dhaka Division
560/8d (147.2 overs); Naeem Islam 216 (349); Shuvagata Hom 3/125 (32 overs)		321 (142.5 overs); Shuvagata Hom 67 (100); Abdur Rahman 4/60 (26.5 overs)
		85/1 (51 overs) (f/o); Abdul Mazid 52* (154); Mahmudul Hasan 1/28 (11 overs)

Match drawn
Sheikh Abu Naser Stadium, Khulna
Umpires: Anisur Rahman and Imran Parvez
Player of the match: Naeem Islam (Rangpur Division)

- Rangpur Division won the toss and elected to bat.
- Robiul Haque (Rangpur Division) made his first-class debut.

13–16 October 2017
Scorecard

Khulna Division	v	Barisal Division
511/8d (80.4 overs); Ziaur Rahman 152* (222); Sohag Gazi 4/148 (36 overs)		296 (92 overs); Sohag Gazi 65 (74); Nahidul Islam 3/51 (22 overs)
		296/5 (110 overs) (f/o); Fazle Mahmud 107 (237); Anamul Haque 1/14 (3 overs)

Match drawn
Shaheed Kamruzzaman Stadium, Rajshahi
Umpires: Moniruzzaman and Nadir Shah
Player of the match: Ziaur Rahman (Khulna Division)

- Khulna Division won the toss and elected to bat.

20–23 December 2017
Scorecard

Barisal Division	v	Rangpur Division
335 (93.5 overs); Sohag Gazi 99 (104); Tanbir Hayder 3/53 (13.5 overs)		614/7d (176.3 overs); Nasir Hossain 295 (510); Monir Hossain 3/151 (42 overs)
217/4 (62.2 overs); Salman Hossain 61 (96); Tanbir Hayder 2/77 (18 overs)

Match drawn
Shaheed Kamruzzaman Stadium, Rajshahi
Umpires: Morshed Ali Khan and Nadir Shah
Player of the match: Nasir Hossain (Rangpur Division)

- Barisal Division won the toss and elected to bat.
- Linkon Dey (Barisal Division) made his first-class debut.

20–23 December 2017
Scorecard

Dhaka Division	v	Khulna Division
113 (38.4 overs); Raqibul Hasan 28 (61); Mehedi Hasan 7/24 (11.4 overs)		459/8d (91 overs); Anamul Haque 202 (251); Mohammad Sharif 3/70 (14 overs)
297 (99.5 overs); Raqibul Hasan 58 (115); Rubel Hossain 3/64 (14 overs)

Khulna Division won by an innings and 49 runs
Bangladesh Krira Shikkha Protisthan Ground, Savar
Umpires: Anisur Rahman and Masudur Rahman
Player of the match: Mehedi Hasan (Khulna Division)

- Khulna Division won the toss and elected to field.

=== Tier 2 ===
Points table

Team	Pld	W	L	D	A	Pts
Rajshahi Division	6	2	0	4	0	25
Sylhet Division	6	1	1	2	2	12
Dhaka Metropolis	6	0	1	4	1	10
Chittagong Division	6	0	1	4	1	8

- Top placed team promoted to Tier 1 for 2018–19 National Cricket League.

15–18 September 2017
Scorecard

Dhaka Metropolis	v	Chittagong Division
344 (118.5 overs); Mohammad Ashraful 104 (194); Nayeem Hasan 4/84 (35.5 overs)		130 (50.5 overs); Pinak Ghosh 28 (85); Nihaduzzaman 5/45 (15.5 overs)
169/6d (45.2 overs); Marshall Ayub 74* (111); Mehedi Hasan Rana 3/37 (10.2 overs)		193/4 (66 overs); Sajjadul Haque 82 (122); Sharifullah 2/66 (25 overs)

Match drawn
Zohur Ahmed Chowdhury Stadium, Chittagong
Umpires: Anisur Rahman and Masudur Rahman
Player of the match: Nihaduzzaman (Dhaka Metropolis)

- Dhaka Metropolis won the toss and elected to bat.
- Nabiul Islam Nayeem (Dhaka Metropolis), Shakhawat Hossain, Shamim Hossain and Sabbir (Chittagong Division) all made their first-class debuts.

15–18 September 2017
Scorecard

Sylhet Division	v	Rajshahi Division
128 (68.3 overs); Imtiaz Hossain 38 (90); Saqlain Sajib 3/26 (16 overs)		79 (27.4 overs); Junaid Siddique 22 (30); Sayem Alam 6/32 (9.4 overs)
162 (75.5 overs); Rajin Saleh 39 (136); Saqlain Sajib 3/27 (13.5 overs)		212/4 (51.2 overs); Farhad Hossain 70 (99); Shahanur Rahman 2/31 (9.2 overs)

Rajshahi Division won by 6 wickets
Shaheed Kamruzzaman Stadium, Rajshahi
Umpires: Morshed Ali Khan and Tanvir Ahmed
Player of the match: Sayem Alam (Sylhet Division)

- Rajshahi Division won the toss and elected to field.
- Jakir Hossain and Shoriful Islam (Rajshahi Division) both made their first-class debuts.

22–25 September 2017
Scorecard

Dhaka Metropolis	v	Sylhet Division

Match abandoned
Sheikh Kamal International Stadium, Cox's Bazar
Umpires: Gazi Sohel and Moniruzzaman

- No toss.
- No play was possible due to rain.

22–25 September 2017
Scorecard

Chittagong Division	v	Rajshahi Division
432 (142.5 overs); Yasir Ali 94 (163); Shoriful Islam 3/70 (24.5 overs)		415 (118.3 overs); Jahurul Islam 79 (140); Mohammad Saifuddin 3/91 (23.3 overs)
1/0 (1 over); Imrul Karim 1* (2)

Match drawn
Shaheed Kamruzzaman Stadium, Rajshahi
Umpires: Akteruzzaman and Shafiuddin Ahmed
Player of the match: Yasir Ali (Chittagong Division)

- Rajshahi Division won the toss and elected to field.
- Imrul Karim (Chittagong Division) made his first-class debut.

29 September–2 October 2017
Scorecard

Rajshahi Division	v	Dhaka Metropolis
220 (77.1 overs); Junaid Siddique 85 (173); Dolar Mahmud 3/35 (14 overs)		326/9d (120 overs); Marshall Ayub 131 (292); Sunzamul Islam 5/124 (44 overs)
11/1 (3 overs); Najmul Hossain Shanto 6 (5); Dolar Mahmud 1/10 (1 over)

Match drawn
Sheikh Abu Naser Stadium, Khulna
Umpires: Gazi Sohel and Masudur Rahman
Player of the match: Marshall Ayub (Dhaka Metropolis)

- Dhaka Metropolis won the toss and elected to field.

29 September–2 October 2017
Scorecard

Sylhet Division	v	Chittagong Division

Match abandoned
Shaheed Chandu Stadium, Bogra
Umpires: Imran Parvez and Tanvir Ahmed

- No toss.
- No play was possible due to rain.

6–9 October 2017
Scorecard

Dhaka Metropolis	v	Chittagong Division
369/9d (131.1 overs); Mehrab Hossain 94 (271); Iftekhar Sajjad 5/91 (42 overs)		261 (90.5 overs); Sazzadul Haque 59 (113); Mohammad Ashraful 3/65 (16 overs)
165/3d (21 overs); Shamsur Rahman 102* (67); Belal Hossen 1/22 (2 overs)		97/6 (49 overs); Sadiqur Rahman 33 (38); Nihaduzzaman 2/11 (12 overs)

Match drawn
Zohur Ahmed Chowdhury Stadium, Chittagong
Umpires: Akteruzzaman and Mahfuzur Rahman
Player of the match: Mohammad Ashraful (Chittagong Division)

- Dhaka Metropolis won the toss and elected to bat.
- Sadikur Rahman and Wahidul Alam (Chittagong Division) both made their first-class debuts.

6–9 October 2017
Scorecard

Sylhet Division	v	Rajshahi Division
221 (72.3 overs); Abul Hasan 60 (96); Delwar Hossain 4/72 (24 overs)		370/7d (77 overs); Mizanur Rahman 143 (169); Abu Jayed 4/80 (19 overs)
151/2 (63 overs); Imtiaz Hossain 108 (160); Farhad Reza 1/44 (13 overs)

Match drawn
Shaheed Chandu Stadium, Bogra
Umpires: Mozahiduzzaman and Sohrab Hossain
Player of the match: Mizanur Rahman (Rajshahi Division)

- Rajshahi Division won the toss and elected to field.
- No play was possible on days 1 and 2 due to rain.
- Sabbir Hossain (Rajshahi Division) made his first-class debut.

13–16 October 2017
Scorecard

Sylhet Division	v	Dhaka Metropolis
319 (110.2 overs); Imtiaz Hossain 132 (217); Saikat Ali 3/53 (13.5 overs)		259 (77.4 overs); Marshall Ayub 98 (149); Enamul Haque 5/96 (34 overs)
263/9d (91.1 overs); Shanaj Ahmed 66 (152); Nihaduzzaman 4/96 (33.1 overs)		133 (49.2 overs); Elias Sunny 37 (46); Enamul Haque 5/63 (21.2 overs)

Sylhet Division won by 190 runs
Zohur Ahmed Chowdhury Stadium, Chittagong
Umpires: Manjurul Islam and Shyful Islam
Player of the match: Enamul Haque (Sylhet Division)

- Sylhet Division won the toss and elected to bat.

13–16 October 2017
Scorecard

Chittagong Division	v	Rajshahi Division
260 (72.4 overs); Sazzadul Haque 95 (176); Farhad Reza 4/86 (20.4 overs)		403 (134.5 overs); Mizanur Rahman 102 (163); Wahidul Alam 2/27 (12 overs)
130 (41.4 overs); Sadiqur Rahman 48 (43); Delwar Hossain 6/23 (9 overs)

Rajshahi Division won by an innings and 13 runs
Shaheed Chandu Stadium, Bogra
Umpires: Shafiuddin Ahmed and Sohrab Hossain
Player of the match: Delwar Hossain (Rajshahi Division)

- Rajshahi Division won the toss and elected to field.
- Towhid Hridoy (Rajshahi Division) and Hasan Mahmud (Chittagong Division) both made their first-class debuts.

20–23 December 2017
Scorecard

Dhaka Metropolis	v	Rajshahi Division
398 (90.3 overs); Shadman Islam 75 (121); Taijul Islam 5/105 (30 overs)		668 (152.4 overs); Najmul Hossain Shanto 194 (296); Nihaduzzaman 4/218 (45 overs)
118/5 (31 overs); Mehrab Hossain 36* (79); Shafiul Islam 3/21 (6 overs)

Match drawn
Zohur Ahmed Chowdhury Stadium, Chittagong
Umpires: Gazi Sohel and Tanvir Ahmed
Player of the match: Najmul Hossain Shanto (Rajshahi Division)

- Rajshahi Division won the toss and elected to field.
- Najmul Hossain Shanto and Mizanur Rahman (Rajshahi Division) made the highest opening partnership in a domestic first-class match in Bangladesh (341 runs).

20–23 December 2017
Scorecard

Chittagong Division	v	Sylhet Division
215 (67.4 overs); Yasir Ali 81 (136); Abul Hasan 3/34 (11 overs)		137 (49.4 overs); Abul Hasan 27 (33); Iftekhar Sajjad 5/43 (16.2 overs)
380/7d (106 overs); Yasir Ali 102* (176); Enamul Haque 3/131 (41 overs)		309/7 (126 overs); Rajin Saleh 104 (254); Mehedi Hasan Rana 3/112 (41 overs)

Match drawn
Sylhet District Stadium, Sylhet
Umpires: Moniruzzaman and Shafiuddin Ahmed
Player of the match: Rajin Saleh (Sylhet Division)

- Sylhet Division won the toss and elected to field.
