= 2022–23 Bangladesh Cricket League =

Cricket tournament

- Dates: 20 December 2022 – 7 March 2023
- Administrator: Bangladesh Cricket Board
- Cricket format: First-class
- Tournament format(s): Round-robin and final
- Champions: South Zone (6th title)
- Runners-up: Central Zone
- Participants: 4
- Matches: 7
- Most runs: Jaker Ali (492)
- Most wickets: Nazmul Islam Apu (19)

The 2022–23 Bangladesh Cricket League was the tenth edition of the Bangladesh Cricket League (BCL), a first-class cricket competition that was held in Bangladesh from 20 December 2022 to 7 March 2023. Bangladesh Cricket Board (BCB) announced the 10th BCL would be held in December 2022. Central Zone were the defending champions.

== Venue ==
Bogra	Chittagong	Cox’s Bazar	Rajshahi
Shaheed Chandu Stadium	Zohur Ahmed Chowdhury Stadium	Sheikh Kamal International Stadium	Shaheed Qamaruzzaman Stadium
Capacity: 15,000	Capacity: 22,000	Capacity: 7,800	Capacity: 15,000
	Zahur Ahmed Chowdhury Stadium	Sheikh Kamal Cricket Stadium	Shaheed Qamaruzzaman Stadium
Matches:2	Matches:1	Matches:3	Matches:1

== Points table ==
Team	Pld	W	L	D	A	Pts
Central Zone	3	2	1	0	0	19
South Zone (C)	3	2	0	1	0	18
East Zone	3	0	1	2	0	4
North Zone	3	0	1	2	0	2

- Advance to the final

South Zone defeated Central Zone in the final by an innings and 33 runs.

== Fixture ==
=== Round 1 ===
19–22 December 2022
Scorecard

Central Zone	v	East Zone
453 (110.5 Overs); Jaker Ali 121 (200); Anamul Haque 5/106 (21.5)		191 (88.3 Overs); Mohammad Naim56 (99); Hasan Murad 5/19 (18)
		146 (55.3 Overs); Nayeem Hasan 44 (71); Robiul Haque 4/61 (16)

Central Zone won by an innings and 116 runs
Shaheed Qamaruzzaman Stadium, Rajshahi
Umpires: Mahfuzur Rahman and Morshed Ali Khan
Player of the match: Jaker Ali and Hasan Murad

- East Zone won the toss and elected to field first

19–22 December 2022
Scorecard

South Zone	v	North Zone
222/9 (81 Overs); Irfan Sukkur 93 (188); Nahid Rana 4/60 (17)		111 (51.4 Overs); Sunzamul Islam 34 (70); Nazmul Islam Apu 4/8 (8.4)
269 (73.2 Overs); Fazle Mahmud 95 (131); Sunzamul Islam 4/53 (19.2)		212 (63.3 Overs); Tanzid Hasan 76 (123); Nazmul Islam Apu 4/66 (17.3)

South Zone won by 168 runs.
Shaheed Chandu Stadium, Bogra
Umpires: Mozahiduzzaman and Tanvir Ahmed
Player of the match: Hasan Mahmud

- North Zone won the toss and elected to field first

=== Round 2 ===
26–28 December 2022
Scorecard

North Zone	v	Central Zone
169 (44.4 Overs); Saif Hassan 73 (105); Musfik Hasan 3/59 (13)		335 (92.3 Overs); Jaker Ali 138 (241); Naeem Ahmed3/91 (27)
247 (67.5 Overs); Akbar Ali 88 (116); Abu Hider 4/66 (15)		'85/0 (17.4 Overs); Abdullah Al Mamun 66* (70); Mahmudul Hasan 0/0 (1)

Central Zone won by 10 wickets
Zohur Ahmed Chowdhury Stadium, Chittagong
Umpires: Mahfuzur Rahman and Tanvir Ahmed
Player of the match: Jaker Ali

- Central Zone won the toss and elected to field first

26–29 December 2022
Scorecard

East Zone	v	South Zone
350 (117.5 Overs); Jahurul Islam 145 (294); Sumon Khan 4/77 (25)		335 (108.3 Overs); Pinak Ghosh 78 (209); Nayeem Hasan 6/89 (36)
260 (78.2 Overs); Jahurul Islam 62 (131); Moin Khan 5/42 (19.2)		77/0 (13.2 Overs); Anamul Haque 51* (49); Nayeem Hasan 0/20 (5)

South Zone won by 10 wickets
Sheikh Kamal International Cricket Stadium, Cox's Bazar
Umpires: Gazi Sohel and Morshed Ali Khan
Player of the match: Jahurul Islam

- East Zone won the toss and elected to bat first

=== Round 3 ===
25–28 February 2023
Scorecard

South Zone	v	Central Zone
313 (97.5 Overs); Shadman Islam 130 (240); Abu Hider 5/55 (17)		283 (74 Overs); Jaker Ali 138* (212); Nasum Ahmed 3/84 (26)
277 (98.1 Overs); Amite Hasan 116 (248); Musfik Hasan 5/54 (21)		197 (62.5 Overs); Aich Mollah 59 (98); Nasum Ahmed 5/94 (26)

South Zone won by 110 runs.
Shaheed Chandu Stadium, Bogra
Umpires: Ali Arman and Sohrab Hossain
Player of the match: Nasum Ahmed

- Central Zone won the toss and elected to field first

25–28 February 2023
Scorecard

North Zone	v	East Zone
378/9 (117 Overs); Naeem Islam 107 (300); Abu Jayed 4/93 (16)		403 (113.5 Overs); Mominul Haque 134 (198); Salauddin Sakil 3/55 (16)
419/8 (103 Overs); Naeem Islam 107* (249); Tanvir Islam 3/128 (37)

Match Drawn.
Sheikh Kamal International Cricket Stadium, Cox's Bazar
Umpires: Moniruzzaman and Muhammad Kamruzzaman
Player of the match: Naeem Islam

- East Zone won the toss and elected to field first.

=== Final ===
4–7 March 2023
Scorecard

South Zone	v	Central Zone
500/5d (161.4 Overs); Shadman Islam 246 (448); Hasan Murad 2/147 (51.4)		230 (74.2 Overs); Jaker Ali 53 (127); Nazmul Islam Apu 3/61 (21)
		237 (73.4 Overs); Abu Hider 77 (127); Khaled Ahmed 5/74 (17.4)

South Zone won by an innings and 33 runs
Sheikh Kamal International Stadium, Cox's Bazar.
Umpires: Ali Arman and Morshed Ali Khan
Player of the match: Shadman Islam

- South Zone won the toss and elected to bat first
