= 2018–19 Dhaka Premier Division Twenty20 Cricket League =

Cricket tournament

- Dates: 25 February 2019 – 4 March 2019
- Administrator: Bangladesh Cricket Board
- Cricket format: Twenty20
- Tournament format: Round-robin
- Champions: Sheikh Jamal Dhanmondi Club (1st title)
- Participants: 12
- Matches: 15
- Player of the series: Farhad Reza
- Most runs: Rubel Mia (129)
- Most wickets: Farhad Reza (11); Shohidul Islam (11)

The 2018–19 Dhaka Premier Division Twenty20 Cricket League was the first edition of the Dhaka Premier Division Twenty20 Cricket League, a Twenty20 cricket competition that was held in Bangladesh. It started on 25 February 2019 and concluded on 4 March 2019. The tournament took place directly before the 2018–19 Dhaka Premier Division Cricket League, and featured the same twelve teams. The final of the competition was played as a night game at the Sher-e-Bangla National Stadium in Mirpur.

The Bangladesh Cricket Board (BCB) instigated the tournament in order to give Bangladeshi players more experience in the 20-over format, in the hope that local players will become more prominent in the Bangladesh Premier League. For this reason the tournament featured local cricketers exclusively, unlike the Dhaka Premier Division Cricket League, in which foreign players take part.

Shinepukur Cricket Club were the first team to qualify for the semi-finals of the tournament, after they won their two matches in Group C. On the final day of the group stage, Prime Bank Cricket Club from Group A and Sheikh Jamal Dhanmondi Club from Group B also progressed to the semi-finals. The final match in Group D, between Gazi Group Cricketers and Prime Doleshwar Sporting Club was washed out, so the fixture was rescheduled for the reserve day to determine which team progresses. Prime Doleshwar Sporting Club won the rescheduled match by three wickets, winning Group D and becoming the fourth team to advance to the semi-finals.

In the first semi-final, Sheikh Jamal Dhanmondi Club beat Shinepukur Cricket Club by five wickets, with man of the match Ziaur Rahman finishing unbeaten on 72 runs from just 29 balls. The second semi-final saw Prime Doleshwar Sporting Club beat Prime Bank Cricket Club by six wickets, with their captain, Farhad Reza, taking five wickets for 32 runs.

Sheikh Jamal Dhanmondi Club won the tournament, after they beat Prime Doleshwar Sporting Club by 24 runs in the final. Imtiaz Hossain was named the man of the match, after scoring 56 runs, and Farhad Reza was named the player of the tournament, following his all-round performance. Following the conclusion of the competition, the BCB confirmed their intentions to have the tournament as a permanent fixture in their domestic calendar.

== Venues ==
Fatullah	Dhaka
Shaheed Ria Gope Cricket Stadium	Sher-e-Bangla National Cricket Stadium
Coordinates: 23°39′0.58″N 90°29′19.72″E	Coordinates: 23°48′24.9″N 90°21′48.9″E
Capacity: 18,000	Capacity: 26,000

== Teams ==
The following teams competed:

- Abahani Limited
- Bangladesh Krira Shikkha Protishtan
- Brothers Union
- Gazi Group Cricketers
- Khelaghar Samaj Kallyan Samity
- Legends of Rupganj
- Mohammedan Sporting Club
- Prime Bank Cricket Club
- Prime Doleshwar Sporting Club
- Sheikh Jamal Dhanmondi Club
- Shinepukur Cricket Club
- Uttara Sporting Club

== Points tables ==
Group A

Teams	Pld	W	L	T	Pts	NRR
Prime Bank Cricket Club	2	2	0	0	4	
Abahani Limited	2	1	1	0	2	
Brothers Union	2	0	2	0	0	

Group B

Teams	Pld	W	L	T	Pts	NRR
Sheikh Jamal Dhanmondi Club	2	2	0	0	4	
Uttara Sporting Club	2	1	1	0	2	
Khelaghar Samaj Kallyan Samity	2	0	2	0	0	

Group C

Teams	Pld	W	L	T	Pts	NRR
Shinepukur Cricket Club	2	2	0	0	4	
Mohammedan Sporting Club	2	1	1	0	2	
Legends of Rupganj	2	0	2	0	0	

Group D

Teams	Pld	W	L	T	Pts	NRR
Prime Doleshwar Sporting Club	2	1	1	0	2	
Bangladesh Krira Shikkha Protishtan	2	1	1	0	2	
Gazi Group Cricketers	2	1	1	0	2	

Teams qualified for the Semi-finals.

== Fixtures ==
=== Group stage ===
==== Group A ====
25 February 2019
Scorecard

Abahani Limited; 150/7 (20 overs)	v	Brothers Union; 125/7 (20 overs)
Sabbir Rahman 58 (43); Mehedi Hasan 2/26 (4 overs)		Yasir Ali 41 (31); Nazmul Islam 3/26 (4 overs)

Abahani Limited won by 25 runs
Sher-e-Bangla National Cricket Stadium, Mirpur
Umpires: Masudur Rahman and Nadir Shah
Player of the match: Sabbir Rahman (Abahani Limited)

- Abahani Limited won the toss and elected to bat.
- Ariful Hasan, Shakil Hossain, Jahid Javed, Munim Shahriar (Abahani Limited), Mehedi Hasan, Rony Hossain, Shakhawat Hossain and Shariful Islam (Brothers Union) all made their T20 debuts.

26 February 2019
Scorecard

Prime Bank Cricket Club; 169/4 (20 overs)	v	Brothers Union; 122/8 (20 overs)
Ariful Haque 59* (33); Sharifullah 2/23 (4 overs)		Fazle Mahmud 39 (32); Monir Hossain 3/24 (4 overs)

Prime Bank Cricket Club won by 47 runs
Sher-e-Bangla National Cricket Stadium, Mirpur
Umpires: Morshed Ali Khan and Nadir Shah
Player of the match: Ariful Haque (Prime Bank Cricket Club)

- Prime Bank Cricket Club won the toss and elected to bat.
- Zahiduzzaman (Brothers Union) and Rubel Mia (Prime Bank Cricket Club) both made their T20 debuts.

27 February 2019
Scorecard

Prime Bank Cricket Club; 176/6 (20 overs)	v	Abahani Limited; 127/9 (20 overs)
Rubel Mia 76 (56); Mohammad Saifuddin 1/20 (4 overs)		Rubel Hossain 36 (23); Alok Kapali 3/22 (4 overs)

Prime Bank Cricket Club won by 49 runs
Sher-e-Bangla National Cricket Stadium, Mirpur
Umpires: Tanvir Ahmed and Mahfuzur Rahman
Player of the match: Rubel Mia (Prime Bank Cricket Club)

- Abahani Limited won the toss and elected to field.
- Zakaria Islam (Abahani Limited) made his T20 debut.

==== Group B ====
25 February 2019
Scorecard

Sheikh Jamal Dhanmondi Club; 169/5 (20 overs)	v	Khelaghar Samaj Kallyan Samity; 158/5 (20 overs)
Nurul Hasan 43 (28); Moinul Islam 2/26 (3 overs)		Robiul Islam Robi 69 (51); Shohidul Islam 4/36 (4 overs)

Sheikh Jamal Dhanmondi Club won by 11 runs
Sher-e-Bangla National Cricket Stadium, Mirpur
Umpires: Morshed Ali Khan and Mahfuzur Rahman
Player of the match: Shohidul Islam (Sheikh Jamal Dhanmondi Club)

- Khelaghar Samaj Kallyan Samity won the toss and elected to field.
- Ifran Hossain, Rishad Hossain, Moinul Islam, Masum Khan, Rafsan Al Mahmud, Amit Majumder, Sadikur Rahman, Robiul Islam Robi (Khelaghar Samaj Kallyan Samity), Shahbaz Chouhan, Fardeen Hasan Ony and Salauddin Sakil (Sheikh Jamal Dhanmondi Club) all made their T20 debuts.

26 February 2019
Scorecard

Khelaghar Samaj Kallyan Samity; 109/7 (17 overs)	v	Uttara Sporting Club; 110/4 (15.5 overs)
Rafsan Al Mahmud 28 (24); Sajjad Hossain 2/5 (2 overs)		Tanzid Hasan 72* (57); Robiul Haque 3/23 (4 overs)

Uttara Sporting Club won by 6 wickets (D/L method)
Khan Shaheb Osman Ali Stadium, Fatullah
Umpires: Akteruzzaman and Gazi Sohel
Player of the match: Tanzid Hasan (Uttara Sporting Club)

- Khelaghar Samaj Kallyan Samity won the toss and elected to bat.
- The match was reduced to 17 overs per side due to rain.
- Mosaddek Iftekhar (Khelaghar Samaj Kallyan Samity), Tanzid Hasan, Minhaz Khan, Shakhir Hossain, Sajjad Hossain, Naimul Islam, Mohimenul Khan, Abdur Rashid, Anisul Islam Emon, Jony Talukdar, Nahid Hasan and Sohel Rana (Uttara Sporting Club) all made their T20 debuts.

27 February 2019
Scorecard

Sheikh Jamal Dhanmondi Club; 72/5 (8 overs)	v	Uttara Sporting Club; 59/5 (7 overs)
Fardeen Hasan Ony 25 (18); Sajjad Hossain 3/8 (1 over)		Anisul Islam Emon 13 (10); Elias Sunny 2/11 (2 overs)

Sheikh Jamal Dhanmondi Club won by 4 runs (D/L method)
Khan Shaheb Osman Ali Stadium, Fatullah
Umpires: Imran Parvez and Gazi Sohel
Player of the match: Elias Sunny (Sheikh Jamal Dhanmondi Club)

- Uttara Sporting Club won the toss and elected to field.
- The match was reduced to 8 overs per side due to rain. Rain further stopped play during Uttara Sporting Club's innings, setting them a revised target of 64 runs from 7 overs.
- Minhajul Abedin and Asaduzzaman Payel (Uttara Sporting Club) both made their T20 debuts.

==== Group C ====
25 February 2019
Scorecard

Legends of Rupganj; 115/5 (13 overs)	v	Shinepukur Cricket Club; 117/5 (12.3 overs)
Shahriar Nafees 46* (24); Suhrawadi Shuvo 2/12 (2 overs)		Shuvagata Hom 32 (10); Asif Hasan 1/14 (3 overs)

Shinepukur Cricket Club won by 5 wickets
Khan Shaheb Osman Ali Stadium, Fatullah
Umpires: Akteruzzaman and Gazi Sohel
Player of the match: Shuvagata Hom (Shinepukur Cricket Club)

- Shinepukur Cricket Club won the toss and elected to field.
- The match was reduced to 13 overs per side due to rain.
- Salauddin Pappu (Legends of Rupganj), Sujon Hawlader, Sabbir Hossain, Hamidul Islam, Mohammad Rakib and Tipu Sultan (Shinepukur Cricket Club) all made their T20 debuts.

26 February 2019
Scorecard

Shinepukur Cricket Club; 192/4 (20 overs)	v	Mohammedan Sporting Club; 170/9 (20 overs)
Towhid Hridoy 66* (41); Saqlain Sajib 1/23 (4 overs)		Irfan Sukkur 52* (29); Suhrawadi Shuvo 2/17 (3 overs)

Shinepukur Cricket Club won by 22 runs
Sher-e-Bangla National Cricket Stadium, Mirpur
Umpires: Mahfuzur Rahman and Masudur Rahman
Player of the match: Shuvagata Hom (Shinepukur Cricket Club)

- Shinepukur Cricket Club won the toss and elected to bat.
- Avishek Mitra (Mohammedan Sporting Club) made his T20 debut.
- Shuvagata Hom (Shinepukur Cricket Club) scored the fastest fifty by a Bangladeshi batsman in T20 cricket (16 balls).

27 February 2019
Scorecard

Mohammedan Sporting Club; 143/9 (20 overs)	v	Legends of Rupganj; 113/8 (20 overs)
Nadif Chowdhury 41* (34); Mohammad Shahid 3/40 (4 overs)		Naeem Islam 28 (23); Saqlain Sajib 2/15 (4 overs)

Mohammedan Sporting Club won by 30 runs
Khan Shaheb Osman Ali Stadium, Fatullah
Umpires: Shafiuddin Ahmed and Nadir Shah
Player of the match: Alauddin Babu (Mohammedan Sporting Club)

- Mohammedan Sporting Club won the toss and elected to bat.
- Azmir Ahmed and Minhazur Rahman (Legends of Rupganj) both made their T20 debuts.

==== Group D ====
25 February 2019
Scorecard

Prime Doleshwar Sporting Club; 111/9 (20 overs)	v	Bangladesh Krira Shikkha Protishtan; 111 (20 overs)
Mahmudul Hasan 41 (43); Sumon Khan 3/18 (4 overs)		Shamim Hossain 45 (36); Manik Khan 4/12 (4 overs)

Match tied
(Bangladesh Krira Shikkha Protishtan won the Super Over)
Khan Shaheb Osman Ali Stadium, Fatullah
Umpires: Tanvir Ahmed and Imran Parvez
Player of the match: Manik Khan (Prime Doleshwar Sporting Club)

- Prime Doleshwar Sporting Club won the toss and elected to bat.
- Ratul Khan, Fahad Ahmed, Parvez Hossain Emon, Mukidul Islam, Aminul Islam, Akbar Ali, Abdul Kayium, Hasan Murad, Naushad Iqbal, Shamim Hossain, Sumon Khan (Bangladesh Krira Shikkha Protishtan), Mohammad Arafat, Saif Hassan and Manik Khan (Prime Doleshwar Sporting Club) all made their T20 debuts.
- Manik Khan (Prime Doleshwar Sporting Club) took a hat-trick.

26 February 2019
Scorecard

Gazi Group Cricketers; 123/4 (10 overs)	v	Bangladesh Krira Shikkha Protishtan; 96/4 (10 overs)
Rony Talukdar 41 (16); Naushad Iqbal 3/20 (2 overs)		Akbar Ali 43 (20); Abu Hider 2/2 (2 overs)

Gazi Group Cricketers won by 27 runs
Khan Shaheb Osman Ali Stadium, Fatullah
Umpires: Akteruzzaman and Gazi Sohel
Player of the match: Rony Talukdar (Gazi Group Cricketers)

- Bangladesh Krira Shikkha Protishtan won the toss and elected to field.
- The match was reduced to 10 overs per side due to rain.
- Sadman Rahman (Bangladesh Krira Shikkha Protishtan), Sajjadul Haque, Waliul Karim, Touhid Tareq and Raihan Uddin (Gazi Group Cricketers) all made their T20 debuts.

27–28 February 2019
Scorecard

Gazi Group Cricketers; 145/6 (20 overs)	v	Prime Doleshwar Sporting Club; 146/7 (18 overs)
Mahedi Hasan 39 (24); Farhad Reza 2/18 (4 overs)		Farhad Reza 36 (15); Raihan Uddin 2/15 (4 overs)

Prime Doleshwar Sporting Club won by 3 wickets
Sher-e-Bangla National Cricket Stadium, Mirpur
Umpires: Morshed Ali Khan and Masudur Rahman
Player of the match: Farhad Reza (Prime Doleshwar Sporting Club)

- Prime Doleshwar Sporting Club won the toss and elected to field.
- No play was possible due to rain, so the match was moved to the reserve day.
- Ruyel Miah (Gazi Group Cricketers) and Aslam Hossain (Prime Doleshwar Sporting Club) both made their T20 debuts.

=== Finals ===
1st Semi-final
1 March 2019
Scorecard

Shinepukur Cricket Club; 181/7 (20 overs)	v	Sheikh Jamal Dhanmondi Club; 182/5 (17.4 overs)
Afif Hossain 65 (41); Salauddin Sakil 4/28 (4 overs)		Ziaur Rahman 72* (29); Suhrawadi Shuvo 2/31 (3 overs)

Sheikh Jamal Dhanmondi Club won by 5 wickets
Sher-e-Bangla National Cricket Stadium, Mirpur
Umpires: Mahfuzur Rahman and Masudur Rahman
Player of the match: Ziaur Rahman (Sheikh Jamal Dhanmondi Club)

- Shinepukur Cricket Club won the toss and elected to bat.

2nd Semi-final
1 March 2019
Scorecard

Prime Bank Cricket Club; 170/9 (20 overs)	v	Prime Doleshwar Sporting Club; 171/4 (19.4 overs)
Alok Kapali 55 (31); Farhad Reza 5/32 (4 overs)		Saif Hassan 61 (49); Abdur Razzak 1/19 (4 overs)

Prime Doleshwar Sporting Club won by 6 wickets
Sher-e-Bangla National Cricket Stadium, Mirpur
Umpires: Morshed Ali Khan and Nadir Shah
Player of the match: Farhad Reza (Prime Doleshwar Sporting Club)

- Prime Doleshwar Sporting Club won the toss and elected to field.

Final
4 March 2019
Scorecard

Sheikh Jamal Dhanmondi Club; 157/7 (20 overs)	v	Prime Doleshwar Sporting Club; 133/8 (20 overs)
Imtiaz Hossain 56 (44); Farhad Reza 3/32 (4 overs)		Farhad Reza 45 (20); Shohidul Islam 4/19 (4 overs)

Sheikh Jamal Dhanmondi Club won by 24 runs
Sher-e-Bangla National Cricket Stadium, Mirpur
Umpires: Mahfuzur Rahman and Masudur Rahman
Player of the match: Imtiaz Hossain (Sheikh Jamal Dhanmondi Club)

- Sheikh Jamal Dhanmondi Club won the toss and elected to bat.
