= 2020–21 National Cricket League =

Cricket tournament

- Dates: 22 March – 29 April 2021
- Administrator: Bangladesh Cricket Board
- Cricket format: First-class
- Tournament format: Double round-robin
- Participants: 8
- Matches: 24

The 2020–21 National Cricket League was the twenty-second edition of the National Cricket League (NCL), a first-class cricket competition held in Bangladesh. The tournament started on 22 March 2021, with the Bangladesh Cricket Board (BCB) using the tournament as preparation for Bangladesh's tour of Sri Lanka in April 2021. The eight teams taking part were placed into two tiers, with the tournament scheduled to end on 29 April 2021. Khulna Division were the defending champions.

The opening round of matches saw Chittagong Division win only their third first-class match in seven years, beating Rajshahi Division by 88 runs. In round two, Barisal Division were bowled out twice by Rajshahi Division inside two days, with Barisal's match aggregate of 142 runs becoming the lowest total in a first-class match in Bangladesh. On 1 April 2021, the remaining matches in the tournament were postponed due to the rising COVID-19 cases in the country.

== Fixtures ==
=== Tier 1 ===
22–25 March 2021
Scorecard

Khulna Division	v	Sylhet Division
375 (109.4 overs); Tushar Imran 99 (117); Ebadot Hossain 3/79 (26.5 overs)		134 (60.4 overs); Imtiaz Hossain 37 (73); Minhazur Rahman 4/31 (16.4 overs)
73/2 (9.3 overs); Imran Uzzaman 33* (26); Rejaur Rahman Raja 1/5 (1 over)		308 (104.5 overs) (f/o); Zakir Hasan 140 (233); Abdul Halim 4/62 (27 overs)

Khulna Division won by 8 wickets
Sheikh Abu Naser Stadium, Khulna
Umpires: Imran Parvez and Sharfuddoula
Player of the match: Zakir Hasan (Sylhet Division)

- Sylhet Division won the toss and elected to field.
- Minhazur Rahman (Khulna Division) made his first-class debut.

22–25 March 2021
Scorecard

Dhaka Division	v	Rangpur Division
365 (106.3 overs); Saif Hassan 127 (233); Alauddin Babu 4/46 (16 overs)		230 (93.4 overs); Nasir Hossain 115 (252); Nazmul Islam 4/89 (39 overs)
128 (45.5 overs); Mohammad Arafat 40* (36); Nasir Hossain 4/21 (9.5 overs)		186 (86.2 overs); Naeem Islam 61 (194); Nazmul Islam 6/64 (39.2 overs)

Dhaka Division won by 80 runs
Bangladesh Krira Shikkha Protisthan No 4 Ground, Savar
Umpires: Shafiuddin Ahmed and Masudur Rahman
Player of the match: Nazmul Islam (Dhaka Division)

- Dhaka Division won the toss and elected to bat.

29 March – 1 April 2021
Scorecard

Khulna Division	v	Rangpur Division
221 (49.2 overs); Tushar Imran 116 (136); Mukidul Islam 6/64 (13.2 overs)		364 (97.1 overs); Ariful Haque 97 (164); Masum Khan 4/78 (22.1 overs)
259 (69.3 overs); Amit Majumder 89 (166); Mukidul Islam 6/67 (20 over)		120/3 (33.3 overs); Nasir Hossain 48* (44); Abdul Halim 2/31 (8 overs)

Rangpur Division won by 7 wickets
Rangpur Cricket Garden, Rangpur
Umpires: Moniruzzaman and Gazi Sohel
Player of the match: Mukidul Islam (Rangpur Division)

- Khulna Division won the toss and elected to bat.

29 March – 1 April 2021
Scorecard

Sylhet Division	v	Dhaka Division
370 (114 overs); Zakir Hasan 159 (228); Shuvagata Hom 4/86 (29 overs)		280 (79.1 overs); Shuvagata Hom 114 (133); Rahatul Ferdous 7/75 (22.1 overs)
219 (81.5 overs); Asadulla Al Galib 82 (164); Saif Hassan 2/19 (12 overs)		147/5 (64 overs); Saif Hassan 64 (89); Enamul Haque 3/31 (17 overs)

Match drawn
Sheikh Kamal International Stadium, Cox's Bazar
Umpires: Shafiuddin Ahmed and Sohrab Hossain
Player of the match: Shuvagata Hom (Dhaka Division)

- Dhaka Division won the toss and elected to field.
- Tanzim Hasan Sakib (Sylhet Division) made his first-class debut.

5–8 April 2021
Scorecard

Rangpur Division	v	Sylhet Division

Bangladesh Krira Shikkha Protisthan No 4 Ground, Savar

5–8 April 2021
Scorecard

Dhaka Division	v	Khulna Division

Khan Shaheb Osman Ali Stadium, Fatullah

=== Tier 2 ===
22–25 March 2021
Scorecard

Chittagong Division	v	Rajshahi Division
287 (101.2 overs); Shahadat Hossain 108 (256); Farhad Reza 4/44 (27.2 overs)		152 (44.3 overs); Farhad Reza 27* (31); Noman Chowdhury 4/47 (12 overs)
147 (50.5 overs); Irfan Sukkur 65 (80); Towhid Hridoy 3/19 (6 overs)		194 (69 overs); Junaid Siddique 68* (163); Mehedi Hasan Rana 4/35 (17 overs)

Chittagong Division won by 88 runs
Shaheed Qamaruzzaman Stadium, Rajshahi
Umpires: Tanvir Ahmed and Mozahiduzzaman
Player of the match: Mehedi Hasan Rana (Chittagong Division)

- Chittagong Division won the toss and elected to bat.
- Pritom Kumar, Asaduzzaman Payel (Rajshahi Division), Parvez Hossain Emon and Hasan Murad (Chittagong Division) all made their first-class debuts.
- Shahadat Hossain (Chittagong Division) scored his maiden century in first-class cricket.

22–25 March 2021
Scorecard

Barisal Division	v	Dhaka Metropolis
241 (76 overs); Mohammad Ashraful 48 (134); Abu Hider 3/34 (14 overs)		413 (129.2 overs); Marshall Ayub 112 (165); Kamrul Islam 2/49 (24 overs)
208 (73.2 overs); Moinul Islam 63 (155); Abu Hider 3/42 (20 overs)		37/2 (11.5 overs); Zahiduzzaman 15* (35); Tanvir Islam 2/13 (3.5 overs)

Dhaka Metropolis won by 8 wickets
Barisal Divisional Stadium, Barisal
Umpires: Mahfuzur Rahman and Gazi Sohel
Player of the match: Shohidul Islam (Dhaka Metropolis)

- Barisal Division won the toss and elected to bat.
- Anisul Islam Emon and Rakibul Hasan (Dhaka Metropolis) both made their first-class debuts.
- Shohidul Islam (Dhaka Metropolis) scored his maiden century in first-class cricket.

29 March – 1 April 2021
Scorecard

Barisal Division	v	Rajshahi Division
82 (29.3 overs); Moin Khan 18 (26); Sunzamul Islam 4/18 (10 overs)		151 (48.5 overs); Junaid Siddique 43 (99); Sohag Gazi 6/65 (23 overs)
60 (34 overs); Moinul Islam 28 (81); Sunzamul Islam 6/15 (13 overs)

Rajshahi Division won by an innings and 9 runs
Bangladesh Krira Shikkha Protisthan No 4 Ground, Savar
Umpires: Morshed Ali Khan and Mozahiduzzaman
Player of the match: Taijul Islam (Rajshahi Division)

- Barisal Division won the toss and elected to bat.

29 March – 1 April 2021
Scorecard

Chittagong Division	v	Dhaka Metropolis
402/8d (126.3 overs); Pinak Ghosh 159 (202); Arafat Sunny 3/120 (39 overs)		267 (107.2 overs); Zahiduzzaman 71 (212); Hasan Murad 5/72 (26.2 overs)
234/6d (48 overs); Mahmudul Hasan Joy 78 (102); Sharifullah 2/94 (20 overs)		148/2 (50 overs); Zahiduzzaman 61* (112); Mehedi Hasan Rana 1/39 (11 overs)

Match drawn
Sheikh Kamal International Stadium, Cox's Bazar
Umpires: Mahfuzur Rahman and Masudur Rahman
Player of the match: Pinak Ghosh (Chittagong Division)

- Dhaka Metropolis won the toss and elected to field.

5–8 April 2021
Scorecard

Dhaka Metropolis	v	Rajshahi Division

Shaheed Qamaruzzaman Stadium, Rajshahi

5–8 April 2021
Scorecard

Chittagong Division	v	Barisal Division

Sheikh Kamal International Stadium, Cox's Bazar
