= List of Dhaka Metropolis cricketers =

This is presenting a complete list in alphabetical order of cricketers who have played for Dhaka Metropolis in first-class, List A or Twenty20 matches since the team was formed ahead of the 1999–2000 season for the first National Cricket League (NCL) competition. Complying with other club lists, details are the player's name followed by his years active as a Dhaka Metropolis player, current players to the end of the 2015–16 season.

Please to note that this list excludes players who appeared for the team in 1999–2000 only. This is because the NCL was not a first-class competition in its opening season. Some players (for example, Habibul Bashar) played for Dhaka Metropolis that season and then played in first-class cricket for other teams in later seasons.

== A ==
- Abu Bakkar (2013–14)
- Abu Hider (2012–13 to 2015–16)
- Al-Amin (2013 to 2013–14)
- Al Sahariar (2000–01)
- Anwar Hossain (2000–01)
- Arafat Salahuddin (2011–12)
- Arafat Sunny (2011–12 to 2015–16)
- Arman Hossain (2011–12 to 2013–14)
- Ashiqur Rahman (2000–01)
- Asif Ahmed (2011–12 to 2015–16)
- Asif Hasan (2014–15 to 2015–16)

== B ==
- Bishawnath Halder (2013 to 2013–14)

== E ==
- Elias Sunny (2011–12 to 2015–16)

== H ==
- Halim Shah (2000–01)

== K ==
- Khaled Mahmud (1999–2000 to 2000–01)

== M ==
- Mafizul Islam (2000–01)
- Mahbubul Alam (2013)
- Mahmudullah (2013–14 to 2015–16)
- Marshall Ayub (2011–12 to 2015–16)
- Masudur Rahman (2000–01)
- M. A. Matin (2000–01)
- Mehedi Hasan (2013–14 to 2015–16)
- Mehrab Hossain senior (2000–01)
- Mehrab Hossain junior (2011–12 to 2015–16)
- Mohammad Ashraful (2000–01 to 2012–13)
- Mohammad Azim (2013–14)
- Mohammad Forkan (2011–12)
- Mohammad Shahid (2013–14 to 2015–16)
- Morshed Ali Khan (2000–01)

== N ==
- Naeem Hafeez (2000–01)
- Naimur Rahman (1999–2000 to 2000–01)
- Nazmul Hossain Milon (2013–14)
- Niamur Rashid (2000–01)

== S ==
- Saghir Hossain (2012–13 to 2013–14)
- Saiful Islam (2000–01)
- Saikat Ali (2013–14 to 2015–16)
- Sajjad Ahmed (2000–01)
- Shadman Islam (2013–14 to 2015–16)
- Shahbaz Butt (2011–12)
- Shohidul Islam (2015–16)
- Shahin Hossain (1999–2000 to 2000–01)
- Shamsur Rahman (2011–12 to 2015–16)
- Sharfuddoula (2000–01)
- Sharifullah (2011–12 to 2015–16)
- Shohag Raza (2013–14 to 2014–15)
- Suleman Khan (2011–12 to 2012–13)

== T ==
- Talha Jubair (2000–01 to 2013–14)
- Tareq Aziz (2011–12 to 2013–14)
- Tariq Mahmood (2000–01)
- Tasamul Haque (2011–12 to 2013–14)
- Taskin Ahmed (2011–12 to 2012–13)

== Z ==
- Zabid Hossain (2014–15 to 2015–16)
- Zahoor Elahi (2000–01)
- Ziaul Haque (2000–01)
