= Saleh Ahmed =

Saleh Ahmed may refer to:

- Saleh Ahmed (actor) (1936/7–2019), Bangladeshi actor
- Saleh Ahmed Pamba (born 1950), Tanzanian politician
- Saleh Ahmed (cricketer, born 1969), Bangladeshi cricketer
- Saleh Ahmed Farhan (born 1981), Bahraini footballer
- Saleh Ahmed (cricketer, born 1997), Bangladeshi cricketer
- Awad Saleh Ahmed (born 1969), Yemeni athlete
- Mohammed Saleh Ahmed Al-Helali, Yemeni bureaucrat
