= Sajjad Hussain =

Sajjad Hussain may refer to:

- Sajjad Hussain (cricketer, born 1980), born Mohammed Sajjad Zaheer Hussain, former cricketer from Assam and Tripura states of India
- Sajjad Hussain (cricketer, born 1986), Pakistani cricketer
- Sajjad Hussain (composer) (1917-1995), Indian film score composer
- Sajjad Hossain, Bangladeshi cricketer
