= Sujeet Parbatani =

Indian cricketer (born 1995)

Personal information
- Full name: Sujeet Anwar Ali Parbatani
- Born: 11 October 1995 (age 31); Hyderabad, India
- Nickname: Pintu
- Batting: Left-handed
- Bowling: Slow left-arm orthodox
- Role: All-rounder
- Source: ESPNcricinfo, 26 December 2020

Sujeet Parbatani (born 11 October 1995) is an Indian cricketer. He made his List A debut for Cricket Coaching School in the 2013–14 Dhaka Premier Division Cricket League on 17 September 2013. He also played for Sheikh Jamal Dhanmondi Club in the Dhaka Premier Division Cricket League. In January 2021, he was named in the Northern Warriors' squad for the 2021 T10 League.
