= Sabbir (cricketer) =

Bangladeshi cricketer

Personal information
- Full name: Sabbir
- Source: Cricinfo, 15 September 2017

Sabbir is a Bangladeshi cricketer. He made his first-class debut for Chittagong Division in the 2017–18 National Cricket League on 15 September 2017.
