= Minhazur Rahman =

Bangladeshi cricketer (born 2001)

Personal information
- Full name: Minhazur Rahman Mohanna
- Born: 27 September 2001 (age 25)
- Batting: Right handed
- Bowling: Slow left-arm orthodox
- Source: ESPNcricinfo, 13 August 2021

Minhazur Rahman (born 27 September 2001) is a Bangladeshi cricketer. He made his Twenty20 debut for Legends of Rupganj in the 2018–19 Dhaka Premier Division Twenty20 Cricket League on 27 February 2019. He made his List A debut for Legends of Rupganj in the 2018–19 Dhaka Premier Division Cricket League on 22 March 2019. He made his first-class debut for Khulna Division against Sylhet Division in the 2020–21 National Cricket League on 22 March 2021.
