= Zakaria Islam =

Bangladeshi cricketer (born 2002)

Personal information
- Born: 14 February 2002 (age 24)
- Source: Cricinfo, 27 February 2019

Zakaria Islam (born 14 February 2002) is a Bangladeshi cricketer. He made his Twenty20 debut for Abahani Limited in the 2018–19 Dhaka Premier Division Twenty20 Cricket League on 27 February 2019.
