= Raihan Uddin =

Bangladeshi cricketer (born 1991)

Personal information
- Born: 6 June 1991 (age 35); Kushtia, Bangladesh
- Batting: Left-handed
- Bowling: Slow left-arm orthodox
- Source: ESPNcricinfo, 27 May 2017

Raihan Uddin (born 6 June 1991) is a Bangladeshi cricketer. He made his List A debut for Prime Bank Cricket Club in the 2015–16 Dhaka Premier Division Cricket League on 30 April 2016. He made his Twenty20 debut on 26 February 2019, for Gazi Group Cricketers in the 2018–19 Dhaka Premier Division Twenty20 Cricket League. He made his first-class debut on 24 October 2021, for Khulna Division against Sylhet Division in the 2021–22 National Cricket League.
