= Linkon Dey =

Bangladeshi cricketer

Personal information
- Full name: Linkon Dey Sanjay
- Source: ESPNcricinfo, 25 December 2020

Linkon Dey is a Bangladeshi cricketer. He made his first-class debut for Barisal Division in the 2017–18 National Cricket League on 20 December 2017.
