= Moinul Islam (cricketer, born 1992) =

Bangladeshi cricketer (born 1992)

Personal information
- Born: 16 September 1992 (age 34)
- Batting: Left-handed
- Bowling: Slow left-arm orthodox
- Source: ESPNcricinfo, 13 August 2021

Moinul Islam (born 16 September 1992) is a Bangladeshi cricketer. He made his first-class debut for Khulna Division in the 2017–18 National Cricket League on 22 September 2017. He made his Twenty20 debut for Khelaghar Samaj Kallyan Samity, against Sheikh Jamal, in the 2018–19 Dhaka Premier Division Twenty20 Cricket League on 25 February 2019.
