= Zakaria Masud =

Bangladeshi cricketer (born 1993)

Personal information
- Born: 29 July 1993 (age 33); Barisal, Bangladesh
- Source: ESPNcricinfo, 25 September 2016

Zakaria Masud (born 29 July 1993) is a Bangladeshi first-class cricketer who plays for Barisal Division.

== See also ==
- List of Barisal Division cricketers
