= Rony Hossain =

Bangladeshi cricketer (born 1990)

Personal information
- Born: 4 April 1990 (age 36); Dhaka, Bangladesh
- Source: Cricinfo, 25 February 2019

Rony Hossain (born 4 April 1990) is a Bangladeshi cricketer. He made his Twenty20 debut for Brothers Union in the 2018–19 Dhaka Premier Division Twenty20 Cricket League on 25 February 2019. He has since then only played one further T20, the very next day, against Prime Bank on 26 February 2019.
