= Nabiul Islam Nayeem =

Bangladeshi cricketer

Personal information
- Full name: Nabiul Islam Nayeem
- Source: Cricinfo, 15 September 2017

Nabiul Islam Nayeem is a Bangladeshi cricketer. The 6 ft 10in Nayeem is a right-arm medium bowler. He made his first-class debut for Dhaka Metropolis in the 2017–18 National Cricket League on 15 September 2017.
