= Mohammad Manik =

Bangladeshi cricketer (born 1991)

Personal information
- Born: 4 March 1991 (age 35); Barisal, Bangladesh
- Source: ESPNcricinfo, 25 September 2016

Mohammad Manik (born 4 March 1991) is a Bangladeshi first-class cricketer who plays for Barisal Division.

== See also ==
- List of Barisal Division cricketers
