= Wahidul Alam =

Bangladeshi cricketer (born 1992)

Personal information
- Born: 7 May 1992 (age 34); Chittagong, Bangladesh
- Source: ESPNcricinfo, 7 October 2017

Wahidul Alam (born 7 May 1992) is a Bangladeshi cricketer. He made his first-class debut for Chittagong Division in the 2017–18 National Cricket League on 6 October 2017.
