= Sabuj Barman =

Bangladeshi cricketer

Personal information
- Full name: Sabuj Barman
- Source: Cricinfo, 25 September 2017

Sabuj Barman is a Bangladeshi cricketer. He made his first-class debut for Dhaka Division in the 2017–18 National Cricket League on 22 September 2017. He made his List A debut for Uttara Sporting Club in the 2018–19 Dhaka Premier Division Cricket League on 7 April 2019.
