= Nuruzzaman (cricketer) =

Bangladeshi cricketer (born 1994)

Personal information
- Born: 20 October 1994 (age 32)
- Source: ESPNcricinfo, 25 September 2016

Nuruzzaman (born 20 October 1994) is a Bangladeshi cricketer who plays for Barisal Division. In September 2017, he scored his maiden first-class century playing for Barisal Division against Khulna Division in the 2017–18 National Cricket League. He made his Twenty20 debut on 3 June 2021, for Brothers Union in the 2021 Dhaka Premier Division Twenty20 Cricket League.

== See also ==
- List of Barisal Division cricketers
