= Phoenix Finance and Investments Limited =

Bangladeshi non-banking financial institute

- Formation: 1995
- Headquarters: Dhaka, Bangladesh
- Region served: Bangladesh
- Official language: Bengali
- Website: phoenixfinance.com.bd

Phoenix Finance & Investments Limited (PFIL) is a major non-bank financial institution (NBFI) head office in Dhaka, Bangladesh.

== History ==
Phoenix Finance and Investments Limited was incorporated on 19 April 1995 as Phoenix Leasing Company Limited and received its non-bank financial institution license from Bangladesh Bank on 9 May 1995. In February 2007, the company was renamed Phoenix Finance & Investments Limited to reflect its expanded financial services offerings. It was listed on the Dhaka Stock Exchange and Chittagong Stock Exchange in September 2007 following an initial public offering.

Founding chairperson Deen Mohammad died in 2021 from COVID-19 infection during the COVID-19 pandemic in Bangladesh. The company made a loss for the first time in 2021. The company did not publish financial statements as required for listed companies. In December 2023, the Bangladesh Bank suspended Managing Director S. M. Intekhab Alam due to loan irregularities, including unsecured disbursements and documentation lapses.

== Governance ==
The company’s board of directors includes independent and sponsor directors, and its shareholding structure comprises institutional investors, sponsors, and general shareholders. Md Mamunur Rashid Molla serves as Managing Director.

== Financial performance ==
Phoenix Finance has experienced sustained financial losses since 2021 due to high loan provisioning and regulatory pressure:

- 2021: Loss of BDT 350 million.
- 2022: Loss rose to BDT 1.39 billion.
- 2023: Loss reached BDT 7.05 billion.
- 2024: Record loss of BDT 8.08 billion; EPS fell to BDT -48.73 and no dividend was declared.

By March 2025, total losses since 2021 amounted to BDT 1,817 crore. PFIL was moved to the "Z" category by the stock exchanges due to its poor financial performance.

== Recognition and awards ==
In September 2010, Phoenix Finance received the International Star Award for Quality (Gold Category) from Business Initiative Directions, Madrid. The award recognised the company’s commitment to quality, innovation, and leadership. The award was presented in Geneva to Chairman Deen Mohammad and MD S.M. Intekhab Alam.
