= Musfik Hasan =

Bangladeshi cricketer

Personal information
- Full name: Mohammad Musfik Hasan
- Born: 16 September 2002 (age 24); Patgram, Lalmonirhat
- Batting: Right-handed
- Bowling: Right-arm medium
- Role: Bowler

Domestic team information
- Years: Team
- 2022–present: Rangpur Division
- 2023–present: Mohammedan Sporting Club
- 2024: Khulna Tigers
- Source: ESPNcricinfo, 23 December 2023

Mohammad Musfik Hasan (born 16 September 2002) is a Bangladeshi cricketer, who is a right-arm medium bowler. He plays for the Rangpur Division cricket team in domestic cricket. He has represented the Bangladesh under-19 cricket team. He has also been a member of the Bangladesh A cricket team in international cricket.

== Early life and career ==
He was born to Helal Khan and Murshida Khatun on 16 September 2002, at Patgram Upazila in Lalmonirhat. He grew up with his grandmother, who greatly inspired him in his early cricket career. He first started playing with cricket ball at Lalmonirhat Second Division League in 2018. He got admitted to Cricket Coaching School in Dhaka in 2019, and after practising there, he was selected to the Rangpur Under-16 team and other age level teams. He studied at Lalmonirhat Government College, and played in school-level cricket competitions for the high school. In December 2021, he was named in Bangladesh's squad for the 2021 ACC Under-19 Asia Cup and the 2022 Under-19 Cricket World Cup.

== Domestic career ==
Musfik is well known for bowling accurately and emphasizing on his pace. He made his List A debut for Mohammedan Sporting Club on 2 April 2022, against Prime Bank Cricket Club in the 2021–22 Dhaka Premier Division Cricket League. In October 2022, he was selected to play for Rangpur Division in the 2022–23 National Cricket League. He made his first-class debut for Rangpur Division on 10 October 2022, against Dhaka Division. He took his maiden five-wicket haul in his debut match. On 31 October 2022, he became only the third fast bowler in the history of Bangladesh first-class cricket to take an eight-wicket haul, in the match against Dhaka Division. He finished as one of the top bowlers in the league, picking up 25 wickets from six matches. He also took 13 wickets in four matches in the 2022–23 Bangladesh Cricket League.

In September 2023, he was picked by the Comilla Victorians following the players' draft to play for them in the 2024 Bangladesh Premier League. He made his Twenty20 debut for Comilla Victorians on 19 January 2024, against Durdanto Dhaka.

== International career ==
He made his debut in international cricket for Bangladesh A in an unofficial Test match against India A on 6 December 2023. In May 2023, he was named in Bangladesh A's squad for their first-class series against West Indies A. In June 2023, he was selected to play for Bangladesh A in the 2023 ACC Emerging Teams Asia Cup. In the same month, he also earned his maiden call-up to the Bangladesh cricket team for their one-off Test against Afghanistan. In October 2023, he was named in Bangladesh Emerging Team's squad for a tour of Sri Lanka.
