= Imrul Karim =

Bangladeshi cricketer

Personal information
- Full name: Imrul Karim
- Source: ESPNcricinfo, 2 June 2017

Imrul Karim is a Bangladeshi cricketer. He made his List A debut for Partex Sporting Club in the 2016–17 Dhaka Premier Division Cricket League on 1 June 2017. He made his first-class debut for Chittagong Division in the 2017–18 National Cricket League on 22 September 2017.
