= Jaynul Islam =

Bangladeshi cricketer (born 1992)

Personal information
- Full name: Jaynul Islam
- Born: 1992 (age 33–34)
- Source: ESPNcricinfo, 2 June 2017

Jaynul Islam (born 1992) is a Bangladeshi cricketer. He made his List A debut for Partex Sporting Club in the 2016–17 Dhaka Premier Division Cricket League on 1 June 2017. He made his Twenty20 debut on 31 May 2021, also for Partex in the 2021 Dhaka Premier Division Twenty20 Cricket League. He made his first-class debut on 21 November 2021, for Sylhet Division in the 2021–22 National Cricket League, taking three wickets in the first innings against Rangpur Division.
