= Mohammad Sayeem =

Bangladeshi cricketer

Domestic team information
- Years: Team
- 2001/02: Barisal Division
- FC debut: 2 January 2002 Barisal Division v Dhaka Division
- Last FC: 23 January 2002 Barisal Division v Sylhet Division
- LA debut: 6 January 2002 Barisal Division v Dhaka Division
- Last LA: 18 January 2002 Barisal Division v Dhaka Division

Career statistics
Competition	First-class	List A
Matches	4	2
Runs scored	20	2
Batting average	4.00	–
100s/50s	0/0	0/0
Top score	9	2*
Balls bowled	348	120
Wickets	4	2
Bowling average	57.25	43.00
5 wickets in innings	1	0
10 wickets in match	0	0
Best bowling	2/59	2/68
Catches/stumpings	2/–	1/–
- Source: CricketArchive, 11 December 2016

Mohammad Sayeem is a first-class and List A cricketer from Bangladesh, who played 4 first-class matches and two one day games for Barisal Division in 2001 and 2002. His best first-class bowling, 2 for 59, came in a clash against Dhaka Division.
