= Abid Hossain =

Bangladeshi footballer

Mohammed Abid Hossain
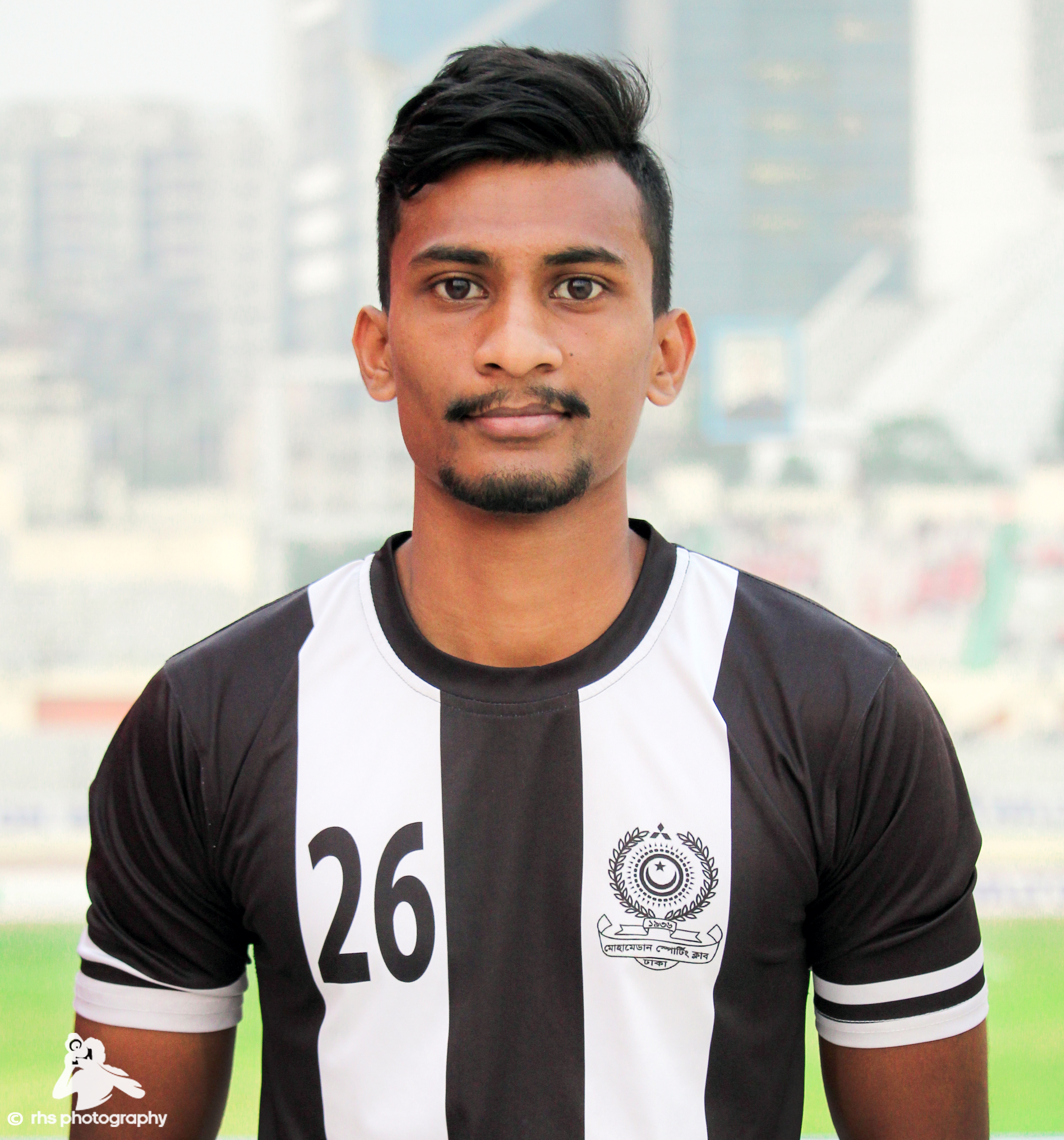
- Mohammed Abid Hossain at Dhaka National Stadium

Personal information
- Full name: Mohammed Abid Hossain
- Date of birth: 31 October 1995 (age 31)
- Place of birth: Dhaka, Bangladesh
- Height: 1.80 m (5 ft 11 in)
- Position: Left back

Youth career
- 2006–2013: Palm Beach Tiger SC

Senior career*
Years	Team	Apps	(Gls)
2014–2016	Palm Beach FC	62	(2)
2017–2023	Mohammedan SC	80	(0)
- * Club domestic league appearances and goals as of 2 June 2023

Mohammed Abid Hossain (Bengali: মোহাম্মদ আবিদ হোসেন ; born 31 October 1995) is a former Bangladeshi-American footballer who played as a left back.

== Early life ==
Abid was born in Dhaka, the capital of Bangladesh to mother Lucky Hossain and father Abul Hossain (former Mohammedan SC and Bangladesh National Football Team captain ).His family moved to West Palm Beach, Florida when he was just 5 years old. He grew up in the city of Greenacres where he attended John I. Leonard High School.

== Club career ==
Abid's career began with the Palm Beach Tiger Sporting Club when he was just 10 years old. He also played for his local school team L.C. Swain. After he graduated from high school, he decided to move to Bangladesh to pursue his career with the Mohammedan SC, where he is the first Bangladeshi-American to ever play in the Bangladesh Football League.

== Style of play ==
Abid is a quick and speedy player as he likes to play in Left Back positions.

== International career ==
In 2022, Abid was named in the Bangladesh national football team's preliminary 35-man roster. However, he was unable to participate after suffering an injury. He never made an appearance for the senior national team. He continued playing domestic football before stopping his playing career in 2024.

== Honours ==
Mohammedan SC

- Bangladesh Federation Cup : 2023
