= Shahadat Hossain (cricketer, born 2002) =

Bangladeshi cricketer (born 2002)

Personal information
- Full name: Shahadat Hossain Dipu
- Born: 4 February 2002 (age 24); Patiya, Chattogram, Bangladesh
- Batting: Right-handed
- Bowling: Right-arm off-break
- Role: Batter

International information
- National side: Bangladesh
- Test debut (cap 102): 28 November 2023 v New Zealand
- Last Test: 30 November 2024 v West Indies
- T20I debut (cap 85): 4 October 2023 v Malaysia
- Last T20I: 7 October 2023 v Pakistan

Career statistics
Competition	Test	T20I	FC	LA
Matches	6	3	44	72
Runs scored	190	26	2,242	2,441
Batting average	15.83	13.00	30.29	39.37
100s/50s	0/0	0/0	3/15	7/9
Top score	31	21	159	131*
Balls bowled	–	–	24	26
Wickets	–	–	0	2
Bowling average	–	–	–	18.00
5 wickets in innings	–	–	–	0
10 wickets in match	–	–	–	0
Best bowling	–	–	–	1/8
Catches/stumpings	8/–	0/–	36/–	36/–
Medal record
Men's Cricket
Representing Bangladesh
ICC U-19 World Cup
Winner	2020 South Africa
- Source: Cricinfo, 6 June 2026

Shahadat Hossain Dipu (born 4 February 2002) is a Bangladeshi cricketer. He made his Twenty20 debut on 26 November 2020, for Beximco Dhaka in the 2020–21 Bangabandhu T20 Cup. Prior to his Twenty20 debut, he was named in Bangladesh's squad for the 2020 Under-19 Cricket World Cup. In February 2021, he was selected in the Bangladesh Emerging squad for their home series against the Ireland Wolves. He made both his first-class (on 26 February 2021) and List A (on 14 March 2021) debut against Ireland Wolves for the Bangladesh Emerging team.

In March 2021, in the opening round of the 2020–21 National Cricket League, he scored his maiden century in first-class cricket, with 108 runs for Chittagong Division.

== International career ==
In June 2023, he received his first international call-up for Test squad for their series against Afghanistan.
