= Nahid Rana =

Bangladeshi cricketer

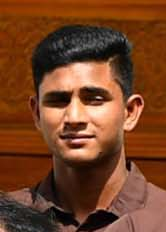

Personal information
- Born: 2 October 2002 (age 24); Chapai Nawabganj, Bangladesh
- Height: 6 ft 5 in (196 cm)
- Batting: Right-handed
- Bowling: Right-arm fast
- Role: Bowler

International information
- National side: Bangladesh (2024–present)
- Test debut (cap 103): 22 March 2024 v Sri Lanka
- Last Test: 20th May 2026 v Pakistan
- ODI debut (cap 150): 11 November 2024 v Afghanistan
- Last ODI: 9th June 2026 v Australia
- ODI shirt no.: 45
- T20I debut (cap 91): 19 May 2025 v United Arab Emirates
- Last T20I: 19th June 2026 v Australia
- T20I shirt no.: 45

Domestic team information
- Years: Team
- 2021–present: Rajshahi Division
- 2023: Khulna Tigers
- 2023–present: Shinepukur Cricket Club
- 2024/25: Rangpur Riders
- 2025: Peshawar Zalmi

Career statistics
Competition	Test	ODI	T20I	FC
Matches	12	12	1	31
Runs scored	21	9	–	36
Batting average	2.62	–	–	1.56
100s/50s	0/0	0/0	–	0/0
Top score	11	4*	–	11
Balls bowled	1,833	666	24	4,556
Wickets	38	25	2	112
Bowling average	36.84	21.80	25.00	27.62
5 wickets in innings	2	2	0	5
10 wickets in match	0	0	0	0
Best bowling	5/40	5/24	2/50	5/40
Catches/stumpings	2/–	2/–	3/–	5/–
Medal record
Men's cricket
Representing Bangladesh
Asian Games
Bronze medal – third place	2022 Hangzhou	Team
- Source: ESPNcricinfo, 10 June 2026

Nahid Rana (Bengali: নাহিদ রানা; born 2 October 2002) is a Bangladeshi professional cricket right-arm fast bowler. He has played for the Bangladesh national team since 2024, and Rajshahi Division since 2021. He is signed to Rangpur Riders in the Bangladesh Premier League (BPL) since 2024, and Peshawar Zalmi in the Pakistan Super League (PSL) since 2026.

== Early life ==
Rana grew up in Chapai Nawabganj district, where he played cricket with a taped tennis ball. He first played cricket with a hard ball in 2020 when, after receiving his Higher Secondary School Certificate, he started training at a cricket academy in Rajshahi. Initially a net bowler for the Rajshahi Division batters, he impressed scouts through his high-speed bowling.

== Domestic career ==
Rana made his first-class debut on October 31st 2021, for Rajshahi Division in the 2021–22 National Cricket League. On October 31st 2022, he claimed his maiden five-wicket haul in first-class cricket, against Barishal Division in the 2022–23 National Cricket League. He was the second highest-wicket taker in the tournament, picking up 32 wickets.

In January 2023, he was selected to play for Khulna Tigers in the 2022–23 Bangladesh Premier League. He made his Twenty20 debut on January 24th 2023, for Khulna Tigers in that tournament. In his debut match, he took 1 wicket conceding 20 runs from 4 overs, and grabbed everyone's attention by constantly bowling around 140-150 km/h.

In the 2022–23 National Cricket League, Rana finished as the second-highest wicket-taker of the tournament with 32 wickets.

He made his List A debut on March 21st 2023, for Shinepukur Cricket Club in the 2022–23 Dhaka Premier Division Cricket League.

In January 2026, playing for Rangpur Riders in the Bangladesh Premier League, Rana took 3 wickets for 11 runs in four overs against Dhaka Capitals, helping his team secure an 11-run victory.

In January 2026, he was bought by the Peshawar Zalmi for the2026 Pakistan Super League. He had a remarkable tournament as he picked up 9 wickets in 5 matches, with an economy rate under 6, helping his team lift the title for the first time in 9 years.

== International career ==
Rana was in the Bangladesh squad for the 2022 Asian Games which took place in late 2023, but did not play a match despite winning the bronze medal. He made his international debut in May 2024, in a home Test match against Sri Lanka at the Sylhet stadium. During the second Test of the Bangladesh tour of Pakistan in September, Rana's bowling performance in the third innings was instrumental for his team's historic 2–0 Test series win.

On 12 January 2025, he was named in Bangladesh's squad for the 2025 ICC Champions Trophy.

On 6 July 2026, Rana bowled the best ODI bowling figures ever for a Bangladesh bowler, bagging 6/21 against Zimbabwe, as they slumped to 141 all out.
