= Sajjad Hossain =

Bangladeshi cricketer (born 1989)

Personal information
- Born: 12 March 1989 (age 37)
- Source: Cricinfo, 7 April 2019

Sajjad Hossain (born 12 March 1989) is a Bangladeshi cricketer, who bowls right-arm off-breaks and bats left-handed. He made his List A debut for Uttara Sporting Club in the 2018–19 Dhaka Premier Division Cricket League on 8 March 2019. He made his Twenty20 debut for Uttara Sporting Club in the 2018–19 Dhaka Premier Division Twenty20 Cricket League on 26 February 2019.
