= Deen Mohammad =

- Born: August 3, 1938; Lalbagh, Dhaka, Bengal Presidency, British India
- Died: September 15, 2022 (aged 84); Dhaka, Bangladesh
- Occupation: Businessman
- Known for: Founder of City Bank and Phoenix Group

Deen Mohammad (3 August 1938 – 15 September 2022) was a Bangladeshi industrialist, entrepreneur, and philanthropist. He was the founder of City Bank and chairman of the Phoenix Group of Industries.

== Early life ==
Mohammad was born on 3 August 1938 in Lalbagh, Dhaka, East Bengal, British India.

== Career ==
Mohammad began his entrepreneurial journey in 1960 with a hardware business, starting with Pakistani Rupee 20,000 given to him by his father Haji Nur Mohammad. He founded the Phoenix Group of Industries, which comprises companies including Phoenix Textile Mills Limited, Phoenix Spinning Mills Limited, Phoenix Fabrics Limited, and Eastern Dyeing and Calendaring Works Limited. Under him, the group grew to employ nearly 20,000 people.

Mohammad also served as the founder chairman and director of The City Bank Limited, Phoenix Finance and Investments Limited, and Phoenix Securities Limited. He was the chairman of Phoenix Insurance Company Limited from 2000 to 2006. Additionally, he was the proprietor of Apollo Steel and a partner in Rupayan Group, a real estate company. He also founded Phoenix Garments Limited, Apollo Ishpat Complex Limited, and Rangdhanu Spinning Mills Limited. He founded Apollo Ishpat in 1994 as a pioneering manufacturer of corrugated iron sheets. It established a galvanizing line in 1997. The company was on the verge of collapse in 2020 due to embezzlement by a director.

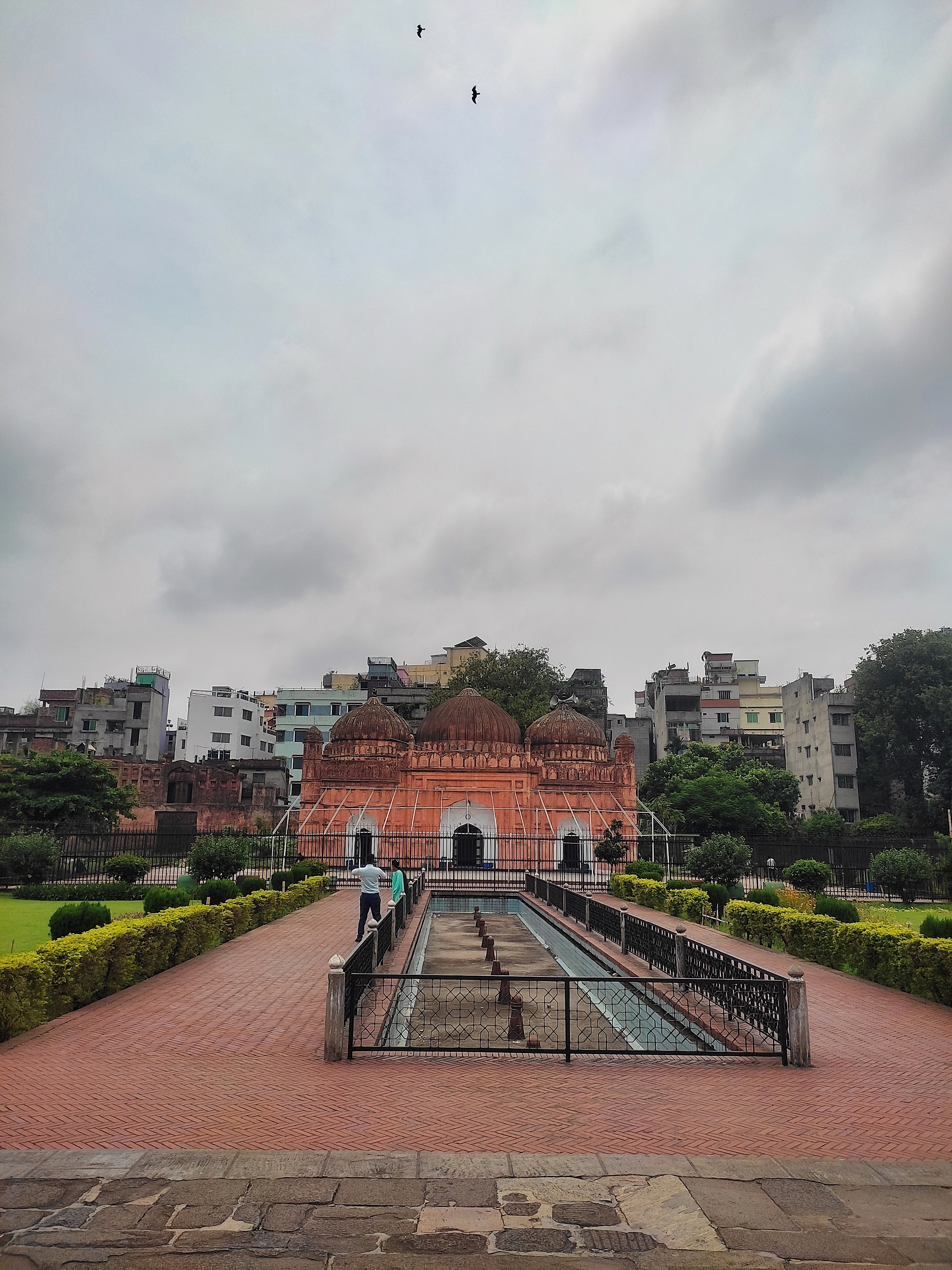
Lalbagh Mosque where his funeral prayers were held

In 2004, Mohammad's Phoenix building collapsed, killing 22 and injuring more. Police filed a case against seven, including Mohammad. High Court Division bench of Justices Surendra Kumar Sinha and Zubayer Rahman Chowdhury rejected his bail petition and asked him to surrender Chief Metropolitan Magistrate's Court for his bail hearing.

Mohammad was a lifelong member of several prominent clubs, including Dhaka Club Limited, Gulshan Club Limited, Uttara Club Limited, and the Rotary Club. He was the president of the Lalbagh Sporting Club and the Rahmatganj Sporting Club. He received the Maulana Akram Khan Gold Medal, the Jagadish Chandra Gold Medal, and the Business Initiative Directions (BID) award from a Spanish-based firm.

== Death ==
Mohammad died on 15 September 2022 at Anwer Khan Modern Hospital in Dhaka, Bangladesh. His death followed a prior COVID-19 infection, which had severely damaged his lungs. He was one of three top businessmen who died during the COVID-19 pandemic in Bangladesh along with M. A. Hashem and Anwar Hossain. His funeral prayers were held at Lalbagh Shahi Mosque and later in Shyamoli. He was laid to rest at the Lalbagh mosque premises.
