= Manik Khan =

Bangladeshi cricketer (born 1997)

Personal information
- Full name: Manik Khan
- Born: 2 January 1997 (age 29)
Medal record
Men's Cricket
Representing Bangladesh
South Asian Games
Gold medal – first place	2019 Kathmandu/Pokhara	Team
- Source: Cricinfo, 9 February 2018

Manik Khan (born 2 January 1997) is a Bangladeshi cricketer. He made his List A debut for Prime Doleshwar Sporting Club in the 2017–18 Dhaka Premier Division Cricket League on 9 February 2018. He made his Twenty20 debut for Prime Doleshwar Sporting Club in the 2018–19 Dhaka Premier Division Twenty20 Cricket League on 25 February 2019, taking a hat-trick against Bangladesh Krira Shikkha Protishtan in a match that ended in a tie. He made his first-class debut on 17 October 2019, for Dhaka Metropolis in the 2019–20 National Cricket League.

In November 2019, he was named in Bangladesh's squad for the men's cricket tournament at the 2019 South Asian Games. The Bangladesh team won the gold medal by defeating Sri Lanka by seven wickets in the final.
