= Sadiqur Rahman =

Bangladeshi cricketer (born 1987)

Personal information
- Full name: Ahmed Sadiqur Rahman
- Born: 20 December 1987 (age 38); Sylhet, Bangladesh
- Nickname: Tajim
- Batting: Right-handed
- Bowling: Right-arm offbreak

Domestic team information
- Years: Team
- 2003/04–2015/16: Sylhet Division
- 2014/15–2016: Brothers Union
- 2014/15: East Zone
- First-class debut: 7 February 2004 Sylhet Division v Chittagong Division
- Last First-class: 17 October 2015 Sylhet Division v Barisal Division
- List A debut: 22 February 2004 Sylhet Division v Chittagong Division
- Last List A: 4 June 2016 Brothers Union v Victoria Sporting Club

Career statistics
Competition	FC	LA
Matches	30	33
Runs scored	749	537
Batting average	17.41	25.57
100s/50s	-/3	-/2
Top score	59	80
Balls bowled	3063	1014
Wickets	50	25
Bowling average	25.57	32.28
5 wickets in innings	1	–
10 wickets in match	1	–
Best bowling	7/105	4/70
Catches/stumpings	7/–	7/–
- Source: CricketArchive, 3 November 2016

Ahmed Sadiqur Rahman (born 20 December 1987 in Sylhet) is a First-class and List A cricketer from Bangladesh. A right-handed batsman and offbreak bowler, he is sometimes referred to on scoresheets by his nickname Tajim. He appeared for Sylhet Division between 2003/04 and 2006/07. His best first-class bowling, 4 for 47, came against Rajshahi Division while he scored 2 first-class fifties, the best a knock of 59 against Chittagong Division. He proved more prolific in the one day arena, scoring 80 against Khulna Division and taking 4 for 70 against the same opposition.
