= Abu Bakkar =

Bangladeshi cricketer (born 1993)

Personal information
- Full name: Abu Bakkar Siddiq
- Born: 15 October 1993 (age 33); Kushtia, Khulna, Bangladesh
- Batting: Left-handed
- Bowling: Slow left-arm orthodox
- Role: All-rounder

Domestic team information
- Years: Team
- 2013/14: Dhaka Metropolis
- 2014–2016: Khulna Division

Career statistics
Competition	First-class
Matches	11
Runs scored	360
Batting average	24.00
100s/50s	0/1
Top score	57
Balls bowled	853
Wickets	15
Bowling average	23.93
5 wickets in innings	1
10 wickets in match	0
Best bowling	5/25
Catches/stumpings	8/–
- Source: ESPN Cricinfo

Abu Bakkar Siddiq (born 15 October 1993) is a Bangladeshi first-class cricketer. He is a left-handed batsman and slow left-arm orthodox bowler. He was selected to play for Dhaka Metropolis in the 2013-14 National Cricket League. Then he represented Khulna Division from 2014 to 2016 in first-class cricket. He made his first-class debut for Dhaka Metropolis in January 2014 during the 2013-14 National Cricket League, in which he scored 33 runs off 82 balls in the first innings and 32 runs off 54 balls in the second innings.
