= Rafsan Al Mahmud =

Bangladeshi cricketer

Personal information
- Full name: Rafsan Al Mahmud
- Batting: Left-handed
- Bowling: Slow left-arm orthodox
- Source: ESPNcricinfo, 22 April 2022

Rafsan Al Mahmud is a Bangladeshi cricketer. He made his List A debut for Khelaghar Samaj Kallyan Samity in the 2016–17 Dhaka Premier Division Cricket League on 15 May 2017. He made his first-class debut for Barisal Division in the 2017–18 National Cricket League on 16 September 2017. He made his Twenty20 debut for Khelaghar Samaj Kallyan Samity in the 2018–19 Dhaka Premier Division Twenty20 Cricket League on 25 February 2019.
