= Salman Hossain =

Bangladeshi cricketer (born 1997)

Salman Hossain Emon
Personal information
- Full name: Mohammad Salman Hossain Emon
- Born: 18 June 1997 (age 29); Barisal, Bangladesh
- Batting: Right-handed
- Bowling: Right arm Fast medium
- Role: All-rounder

Domestic team information
- Years: Team
- 2011–present: Barisal Division
- 2012: Cricket Coaching School
- 2016: Rajshahi kings
- 2020: Gemcon khulna
- 2021-2022: Fortune Barishal
- 2017: Prime bank
- 2018: Agrani Bank Cricket Club
- 2020-2022: Khelaghar Samaj Kallyan Samity
- 2021-2022: Walton Central Zone
- 2013-2016: Prime Bank South Zone

Career statistics
Competition	FC	LA	T20
Matches	76	91	29
Runs scored	3,596	1,966	332
Batting average	29.00	26.93	18.44
100s/50s	3/23	1/15	0/1
Top score	152*	110	53*
Balls bowled	2752	1025	12
Wickets	46	18	0
Bowling average	32.67	55.16	–
5 wickets in innings	2	0	0
10 wickets in match	0	0	0
Best bowling	7/66	3/27	-
Catches/stumpings	51/0	33/–	11/–
- Source: Cricinfo, 20 November 2025

Salman Hossain Emon (born 18 June 1997) is a Bangladeshi first-class cricketer who plays for Barisal Division. He played for Bangladesh U19 team in the 2012 ICC Under-19 Cricket World Cup. He made his list A debut in September 2013 for Cricket Coaching School against Abahoni limited. Recently he played for Fortune Barishal in the 2022 Bangladesh Premier League.

== See also ==
- List of Barisal Division cricketers
