= Saleh Ahmed (cricketer, born 1969) =

Bangladeshi cricketer (born 1969)

Personal information
- Full name: Mohammad Saleh Ahmed
- Born: 2 February 1969 (age 57); Faridpur, Dhaka, Bangladesh
- Batting: Right-handed
- Bowling: Off-break

Career statistics
Competition	First-class	List A
Matches	5	3
Runs scored	152	22
Batting average	21.71	11.00
100s/50s	0/1	0/0
Top score	53	22
Balls bowled	1377	136
Wickets	19	8
Bowling average	26.52	12.62
5 wickets in innings	0	1
10 wickets in match	0	0
Best bowling	4/52	5/37
Catches/stumpings	1/–	1/–
- Source: Cricinfo, 21 April 2023

Mohammad Saleh Ahmed (born 2 February 1969) is a first-class and List A cricketer from Bangladesh. He is a right-handed batsman and slow left-arm orthodox bowler. He is sometimes known by his nickname Sohel. He debuted in 2000 and last appeared in 2002. He played for Barisal Division in 2001/02 after representing Biman Bangladesh Airlines in One-day cricket in 2000/01. His solitary first-class fifty, 53, came against Khulna Division while he took his best bowling, 4 for 54, against Chittagong Division. He was born at Faridpur in Dacca.
