= Cricket Coaching School =

- Nickname(s): CCS

Team information
- Dissolved: 2016

Cricket Coaching School was a Bangladeshi cricket team that played List A cricket in the Dhaka Premier League in 2013-14 and 2015–16.

== History ==
The Cricket Coaching School team lost their first five matches in 2013–14, then won their sixth. They failed to arrive at the ground in time to start their seventh match reportedly after being stuck in a traffic jam, and were immediately demoted from the league. They won 14 of their 16 matches in the 2014-15 Dhaka First Division League, finished first, and returned to List A status in the Dhaka Premier League in 2015–16.

Apart from the captain and manager Rajin Saleh, the Cricket Coaching School team in 2015-16 consisted entirely of young players, many of whom had played for national under-age teams. They won only two of their 11 matches, finished 11th out of 12, and were relegated again.

Before the 2016–17 season the club was bought by Beximco, Bangladesh's largest conglomerate, and renamed Shinepukur Cricket Club, after Shinepukur Ceramics, a subsidiary of Beximco. Shinepukur Cricket Club has competed in the Dhaka Premier League since the 2017–18 season.

While it no longer fields a professional team, the Cricket Coaching School continues to coach young players.
