= Jahid Javed =

Bangladeshi cricketer (born 1995)

Personal information
- Full name: Jahid Javed
- Born: 1 December 1995 (age 30)
- Source: Cricinfo, 2 January 2017

Jahid Javed (born 1 December 1995) is a Bangladeshi cricketer. He made his first-class debut for Rangpur Division in the 2013–14 National Cricket League on 30 January 2014. He made his List A debut for Agrani Bank Cricket Club in the 2017–18 Dhaka Premier Division Cricket League on 5 February 2018. He made his Twenty20 debut for Abahani Limited against Brothers Union in the 2018–19 Dhaka Premier Division Twenty20 Cricket League on 25 February 2019. He scored 44 runs of 33 balls.
