= Abu Sayem =

Bangladeshi cricketer (born 1996)

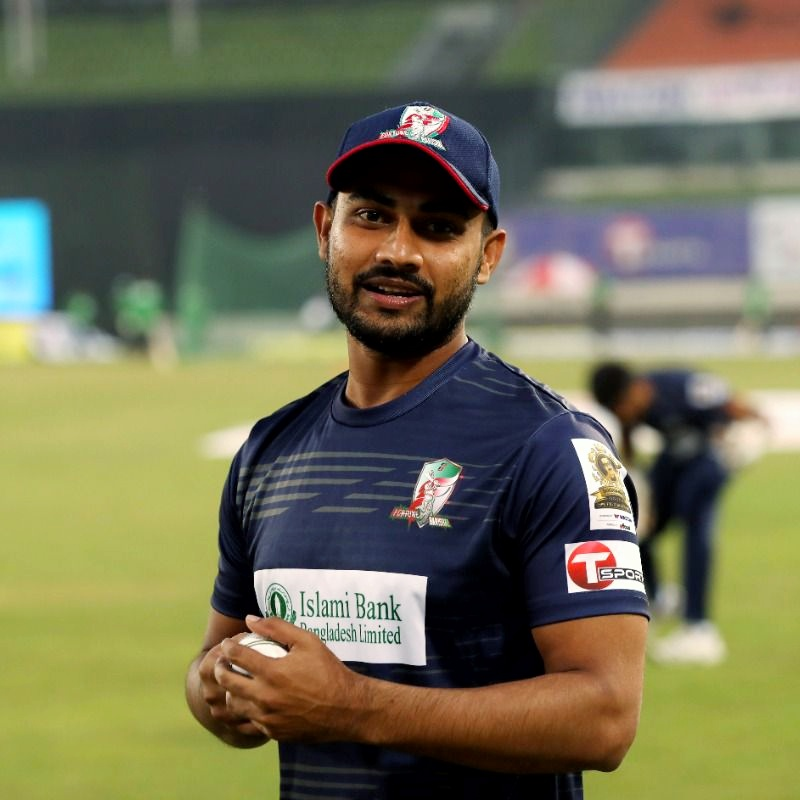

Personal information
- Full name: Abu Sayem Chowdhury
- Born: 13 June 1998 (age 28); Barisal, Bangladesh
- Batting: Right-handed
- Role: Entrepreneur

International information
- National side: Bangladesh

Career statistics
Competition	FC	LA
Matches	1	11
Runs scored	10	146
Batting average	5.00	16.22
100s/50s	0/0	0/0
Top score	10	44
Catches/stumpings	3/1	11/9
- Source: ESPNcricinfo, 25 October 2015

Abu Sayem Chowdhury (born 8 November 1996), known as Abu Sayem, is a Bangladeshi first-class and List A cricketer since the 2014–15 Bangladeshi cricket season and currently (July 2016) is playing for Barishal Division. He was born in Bhola, Bangladesh. He is a right-handed Batsman and a wicket-keeper.
