= Shohidul Islam =

Bangladeshi cricketer

Personal information
- Full name: Md. Shohidul Islam
- Born: 5 January 1995 (age 31); Narayanganj, Bangladesh
- Nickname: Khokan
- Batting: Right-handed
- Bowling: Right-arm medium
- Role: Bowler

International information
- National side: Bangladesh
- Only T20I (cap 73): 22 November 2021 v Pakistan

Career statistics
Competition	FC
Matches	31
Runs scored	757
Batting average	19.41
100s/50s	1/4
Top score	106
Balls bowled	4,594
Wickets	76
Bowling average	31.55
5 wickets in innings	2
10 wickets in match	0
Best bowling	6/64
Catches/stumpings	15/–
- Source: ESPNcricinfo, 3 March 2022

Shohidul Islam (born 5 January 1995) is a Bangladeshi cricketer who plays for Dhaka Metropolis. He made his international debut for the Bangladesh cricket team in November 2021. In July 2022, he was suspended from playing in any form of cricket for ten months, backdated to 28 May 2022, due to a doping violation.

== Domestic career ==
He made his Twenty20 (T20) debut on 21 November 2016 playing for Chittagong Vikings in the 2016–17 Bangladesh Premier League. In November 2018, bowling for Central Zone in the 2018–19 Bangladesh Cricket League, he took his maiden five-wicket haul in first-class cricket. He was the leading wicket-taker for Central Zone in the tournament, with eighteen dismissals in four matches. In August 2019, he was one of 35 cricketers named in a training camp ahead of Bangladesh's 2019–20 season. In November 2019, he was selected to play for the Khulna Tigers in the 2019–20 Bangladesh Premier League.

In March 2021, in the opening round of the 2020–21 National Cricket League, he scored his maiden century in first-class cricket, with 106 runs for Dhaka Metropolis.

== International career ==
In April 2021, he was named in Bangladesh's preliminary Test squad for their away series against Sri Lanka. In May 2021, Shohidul was named in Bangladesh's preliminary One Day International (ODI) squad for their home series against Sri Lanka.

In November 2021, he was named in Bangladesh's Twenty20 International (T20I) squad for their series against Pakistan. He made his T20I debut on 22 November 2021, for Bangladesh against Pakistan. Later the same month, he was added to Bangladesh's Test squad, also for their series against Pakistan. He was also named in Bangladesh's Test squad for their series against New Zealand. In March 2022, he was named in Bangladesh's Test squad for their series against South Africa. In May 2022, he was again named in Bangladesh's Test squad, this time for their series against the West Indies.

== See also ==
- List of Dhaka Metropolis cricketers
