= Pinak Ghosh =

Bangladeshi cricketer (born 1999)

Personal information
- Born: 20 January 1999 (age 27); Mymensingh, Bangladesh
- Batting: Left-handed
- Role: Opening batsman

Career statistics
Competition	First-class	List A
Matches	23	21
Runs scored	1378	449
Batting average	35.33	21.38
100s/50s	3/8	0
Top score	159	62
Catches/stumpings	1/–	5/–
- Source: ESPN Cricinfo, 13 August 2021

Pinak Ghosh (born 20 January 1999) is a first-class cricketer from Bangladesh who plays as an opening batsman. In December 2015 he was named in Bangladesh's squad for the 2016 Under-19 Cricket World Cup.

In December 2017, he was named in Bangladesh's squad for the 2018 Under-19 Cricket World Cup. In November 2019, he was selected to play for the Chattogram Challengers in the 2019–20 Bangladesh Premier League. He made his Twenty20 debut for Chattogram Challengers in the 2019–20 Bangladesh Premier League on 31 December 2019.
