= Sharifullah =

Bangladeshi cricketer (born 1986)

Personal information
- Born: 30 July 1986 (age 40); Dhaka, Bangladesh
- Batting: Right-handed
- Bowling: Right arm off-break

Career statistics
Competition	First-class	List A
Matches	5	5
Runs scored	197	93
Batting average	28.14	31
100s/50s	0/2	0/1
Top score	74	56*
Balls bowled	654	288
Wickets	10	7
Bowling average	26.20	32.57
5 wickets in innings	0	0
10 wickets in match	0	0
Best bowling	3/41	3/27
Catches/stumpings	1/–	3/–
- Source: Cricinfo, 3 September 2022

Mohammad Sharifullah (born 30 July 1986) is a Bangladeshi cricketer in first-class, List A and Twenty20 cricket. He made his first-class debut for Dhaka Division on 14 February 2007.
