= 2024 Bangladesh Premier League =

Professional cricket league in Bangladesh

Bangladesh Premier League 2024
- Dates: 19 January – 1 March 2024
- Administrator: Bangladesh Cricket Board
- Cricket format: Twenty20
- Tournament format(s): Double round-robin and playoffs
- Host: Bangladesh
- Champions: Fortune Barishal (1st title)
- Runners-up: Comilla Victorians
- Participants: 7
- Matches: 46
- Player of the series: Tamim Iqbal (Fortune Barishal)
- Most runs: Tamim Iqbal (492) (Fortune Barishal)
- Most wickets: Shoriful Islam (22) (Durdanto Dhaka)
- Official website: bplt20.com.bd

The Bangladesh Premier League 2024, also known as BPL Season 10, was the tenth season of the Bangladesh Premier League (BPL), a top-level professional Twenty20 cricket league in Bangladesh. The league is organised by the Bangladesh Cricket Board (BCB). The season started from 19 January and the final was held on 1 March 2024. In September 2022, the BPL Governing Council announced the seven franchises which would take part in the tournament. Comilla Victorians were the defending champions.

In the final of the BPL, Fortune Barishal defeated Comilla Victorians by 6 wickets to win their maiden title.

== Teams ==
Team	City	Captain	Coach
Chattogram Challengers	Chattogram	Shuvagata Hom	Tushar Imran
Comilla Victorians	Cumilla	Litton Das	Mohammad Salahuddin
Durdanto Dhaka	Dhaka	Mosaddek Hossain	Khaled Mahmud
Fortune Barishal	Barishal	Tamim Iqbal	Dav Whatmore
Khulna Tigers	Khulna	Anamul Haque	Talha Jubair
Rangpur Riders	Rangpur	Nurul Hasan Sohan	Sohel Islam
Sylhet Strikers	Sylhet	Mashrafe Mortaza	Rajin Saleh

== Squads ==
The players' draft was held on 24 September 2023.

Chattogram Challengers	Comilla Victorians	Durdanto Dhaka	Fortune Barishal	Khulna Tigers	Rangpur Riders	Sylhet Strikers
(Bangladesh) Shuvagata Hom (c); (Bangladesh) Ziaur Rahman; (Afghanistan) Najibullah Zadran; (Pakistan) Mohammad Hasnain; (Bangladesh) Shohidul Islam; (England) ~~Stephen Eskinazi~~; (Ireland) Curtis Campher; (Bangladesh) Tanzid Hasan; (Bangladesh) Al Amin Hossain; (Bangladesh) Shykat Ali; (Bangladesh) Imran Uzzaman; (Pakistan) Bilal Khan; (Bangladesh) Shahadat Hossain; (Bangladesh) Salauddin Sakil; (United Arab Emirates) Mohammad Waseem; (Pakistan) Abdullah Shafique; (Bangladesh) Nihaduzzaman; (Sri Lanka) Avishka Fernando; (England) Phil Salt; (Cricket West Indies) Romario Shepherd; (New Zealand) Tom Bruce; (Australia) Josh Brown; (Pakistan) Hunain Shah; (Bangladesh) Jishan Alam; (Pakistan) ~~Mohammad Haris~~	(Bangladesh) Litton Das (c); (Bangladesh) Mustafizur Rahman; (Pakistan) Muhammad Rizwan; (Bangladesh) Towhid Hridoy; (Bangladesh) Tanvir Islam; (Afghanistan) ~~Rashid Khan~~; (England) Moeen Ali; (Cricket West Indies) Andre Russell; (Cricket West Indies) Sunil Narine; (Pakistan) ~~Iftikhar Ahmed~~; (Cricket West Indies) Johnson Charles; (Pakistan) Khushdil Shah; (Afghanistan) Noor Ahmad; (Pakistan) ~~Zaman Khan~~; (Bangladesh) Mrittunjoy Chowdhury; (Bangladesh) Jaker Ali; (Bangladesh) Rishad Hossain; (Bangladesh) Mahidul Islam Ankon; (Bangladesh) Matthew Forde; (Bangladesh) Imrul Kayes; (Bangladesh) Musfik Hasan; (Bangladesh) Mohammad Enamul; (Bangladesh) Aliss Islam; (Cricket West Indies) Roston Chase; (Pakistan) Aamir Jamal; (Cricket West Indies) Raymon Reifer; (England) Will Jacks; (England) Brooke Guest; (Bangladesh) Rohanat Doullah Borson	(Bangladesh) Mosaddek Hossain (c); (Bangladesh) Taskin Ahmed; (Bangladesh) Shoriful Islam; (Pakistan) Usman Qadir; (Bangladesh) Arafat Sunny; (Pakistan) Saim Ayub; (Sri Lanka) Chaturanga de Silva; (Bangladesh) Saif Hassan; (Bangladesh) Irfan Sukkur; (Bangladesh) Alauddin Babu; (Bangladesh) SM Meherob; (Sri Lanka) Lahiru Samarakoon; (Sri Lanka) Sadeera Samarawickrama; (Bangladesh) Mohammad Naim; (Bangladesh) Sabbir Hossain; (Bangladesh) Jasimuddin; (Sri Lanka) Lasith Croospulle; (Sri Lanka) Danushka Gunathilaka; (Australia) Alex Ross; (Afghanistan) Gulbadin Naib; (Pakistan) Mohammad Irfan; (Cricket West Indies) Andre Mccarthy; (Bangladesh) Tahjibul Islam; (Zimbabwe) Sean Williams; (England) Adam Rossington	(Bangladesh) Tamim Iqbal (c); (Bangladesh) Mahmudullah; Tom Banton; (Bangladesh) Mehidy Hasan; (Afghanistan) Ibrahim Zadran; (Bangladesh) Khaled Ahmed; (Pakistan) Shoaib Malik; (Pakistan) ~~Fakhar Zaman~~; (Pakistan) Abbas Afridi; (Sri Lanka) Dunith Wellalage; (Bangladesh) Mushfiqur Rahim; (Bangladesh) Rakibul Hasan; (Bangladesh) Mohammad Saifuddin; (Bangladesh) Soumya Sarkar; (Cricket West Indies) Yannic Cariah; (Bangladesh) Kamrul Islam Rabbi; (Bangladesh) Pritom Kumar; (Bangladesh) Taijul Islam; (Bangladesh) Prantik Nawrose Nabil; (Sri Lanka) ~~Dinesh Chandimal~~; (Pakistan) ~~Mohammad Amir~~; (Afghanistan) ~~Naveen ul Haq~~; (Bangladesh) Mehedi Hasan Rana; (South Africa) David Miller; (Pakistan) Akif Javed; (Sri Lanka) ~~Nuwan Thushara~~; (Pakistan) Mohammad Imran; (Cricket West Indies) Kyle Mayers; (Cricket West Indies) Obed McCoy; (Pakistan) Ahmed Shehzad; (South Africa) Keshav Maharaj; (Ireland) ~~Paul Stirling~~	(Bangladesh) Anamul Haque Bijoy (c); (Bangladesh) Nasum Ahmed; (Cricket West Indies) Jason Holder; (Bangladesh) Mahmudul Hasan Joy; (Bangladesh) Nahidul Islam; (Cricket West Indies) Shai Hope; (Cricket West Indies) Evin Lewis; (Pakistan) Faheem Ashraf; (Sri Lanka) ~~Dhananjaya de Silva~~; (Pakistan) Mohammad Wasim Jr.; (Bangladesh) Afif Hossain; (Bangladesh) Rubel Hossain; (Bangladesh) Parvez Hossain Emon; (Bangladesh) Habibur Rahman Sohan; (Sri Lanka) Kasun Rajitha; (Sri Lanka) Dasun Shanaka; (Bangladesh) Mukidul Islam; (Bangladesh) Akbar Ali; (Bangladesh) Sumon Khan; (Bangladesh) Nahid Rana; (Cricket West Indies) Oshane Thomas; (Pakistan) Mohammad Nawaz; (Cricket West Indies) Mark Deyal; (South Africa) Wayne Parnell; (England) Alex Hales; (England) Luke Wood; (Bangladesh) Arif Ahmed; (Cricket West Indies) Jon-Russ Jaggesar	(Bangladesh) Nurul Hasan Sohan (c); (Pakistan) Babar Azam (vc); (Bangladesh) Shakib Al Hasan; (Cricket West Indies) Nicholas Pooran; (Bangladesh) Hasan Mahmud; (Sri Lanka) ~~Wanindu Hasaranga~~; (Bangladesh) Sheikh Mahedi Hasan; (Sri Lanka) ~~Matheesha Pathirana~~; (Afghanistan) Azmatullah Omarzai; (Cricket West Indies) Brandon King; (Pakistan) ~~Ihsanullah~~; (Bangladesh) Rony Talukdar; (Bangladesh) Shamim Hossain; (Bangladesh) Ripon Mondol; (Bangladesh) Hasan Murad; (New Zealand) Michael Rippon; (United States) Yasir Mohammad; (Bangladesh) Abu Haider; (Bangladesh) Fazle Mahmud; (Bangladesh) Ashiqur Zaman; (Afghanistan) Mohammad Nabi; (South Africa) Imran Tahir; (Pakistan) Salman Irshad; (Bangladesh) Iftakhar Hossain Ifti; (New Zealand) Jimmy Neesham; (South Africa) Dwaine Pretorius; (Bangladesh) Mominul Haque; (England) Tom Moores; (South Africa) Reeza Hendricks; (Afghanistan) Fazalhaq Farooqi	(Bangladesh) Mashrafe Mortaza (c); (Bangladesh) Mohammad Mithun (vc); (Bangladesh) Najmul Hossain Shanto; (Bangladesh) Zakir Hasan; (Bangladesh) Tanzim Hasan Sakib; Mahmudur Rahman Niaz; (Zimbabwe) Ryan Burl; (Australia) Ben Cutting; (Ireland) Harry Tector; (England) ~~George Scrimshaw~~; (Bangladesh) Rejaur Rahman Raja; (Bangladesh) Ariful Haque; (Bangladesh) Yasir Ali; (Zimbabwe) Richard Ngarava; (Sri Lanka) Dushan Hemantha; (Bangladesh) Nazmul Islam Apu; (Bangladesh) Shafiqul Islam; (Bangladesh) Nayeem Hasan; (Bangladesh) Jawad Royen; (Bangladesh) Salman Hossain; (England) Benny Howell; (England) Samit Patel; (Cricket West Indies) Shannon Gabriel; (Bangladesh) Sunzamul Islam; (Bangladesh) Shamsur Rahman; (Sri Lanka) Angelo Perera; (Cricket West Indies) Kennar Lewis

== Venues ==
Chittagong	Dhaka	Sylhet
Zohur Ahmed Chowdhury Stadium	Sher-e-Bangla National Cricket Stadium	Sylhet International Cricket Stadium
Capacity: 20,000	Capacity: 26,000	Capacity: 18,500
Matches:12	Matches:22	Matches:12
2024 Bangladesh Premier League is located in Bangladesh

== Teams and standings ==
=== Points Table ===
Pos	Team	Pld	W	L	T	NR	Pts	NRR	Qualification
1	Rangpur Riders	12	9	3	0	0	18	1.438	Advance to Qualifier 1
2	Comilla Victorians	12	8	4	0	0	16	1.149	Advance to Qualifier 1
3	Fortune Barishal (C)	12	7	5	0	0	14	0.414	Advance to Eliminator
4	Chattogram Challengers	12	7	5	0	0	14	−0.410	Advance to Eliminator
5	Khulna Tigers	12	5	7	0	0	10	−0.447	
6	Sylhet Strikers	12	5	7	0	0	10	−0.748	
7	Durdanto Dhaka	12	1	11	0	0	2	−1.420	

Source: ESPN Cricinfo
(C) Champions

=== Win–loss table ===
Below is a summary of results for each team's twelve regular season matches, plus finals where applicable, in chronological order. A team's opponent for any given match is listed above the margin of victory/defeat.

Team	1	2	3	4	5	6	7	8	9	10	11	12	Q1	El	Q2	F	Pos.
Chattogram Challengers (CC)	SS; 7 wickets	KT; 4 wickets	DD; 6 wickets	FB; 10 runs	SS; 8 wickets	CV; 7 wickets	FB; 16 runs	RR; 53 runs	CV; 73 runs	RR; 18 runs	DD; 10 runs	KT; 65 runs	→	FB; 7 wickets	Eliminated		4th
Comilla Victorians (CV)	DD; 5 wickets	FB; 4 wickets	SS; 52 runs	RR; 8 runs	CC; 7 wickets	KT; 34 runs	DD; 4 wickets	CC; 73 runs	KT; 7 wickets	SS; 12 runs	RR; 6 wickets	FB; 6 wickets	RR; 6 wickets	→	→	FB; 6 wickets	2nd place, silver medalist(s)
Durdanto Dhaka (DD)	CV; 5 wickets	CC; 6 wickets	RR; 79 runs	KT; 10 wickets	SS; 15 runs	RR; 60 runs	SS; 5 wickets	CV; 4 wickets	FB; 40 runs	FB; 27 runs	KT; 5 wickets	CC; 10 runs	Eliminated				7th
Fortune Barishal (FB)	RR; 5 wickets	KT; 8 wickets	CV; 4 wickets	CC; 10 runs	SS; 49 runs	KT; 5 wickets	CC; 16 runs	DD; 40 runs	DD; 27 runs	SS; 18 runs	RR; 1 wicket	CV; 6 wickets	→	CC; 7 wickets	RR; 6 wickets	CV; 6 wickets	1st place, gold medalist(s)
Khulna Tigers (KT)	CC; 4 wickets	FB; 8 wickets	RR; 28 runs	DD; 10 wickets	FB; 5 wickets	CV; 34 runs	SS; 5 wickets	RR; 78 runs	CV; 7 wickets	DD; 5 wickets	CC; 65 runs	SS; 6 wickets	Eliminated				5th
Rangpur Riders (RR)	FB; 5 wickets	SS; 4 wickets	KT; 28 runs	DD; 79 runs	CV; 8 runs	SS; 77 runs	DD; 60 runs	CC; 53 runs	KT; 78 runs	CC; 18 runs	FB; 1 wicket	CV; 6 wickets	CV; 6 wickets	→	FB; 6 wickets	EL	3rd
Sylhet Strikers (SS)	CC; 7 wickets	RR; 4 wickets	CV; 52 runs	CC; 8 wickets	FB; 49 runs	DD; 15 runs	RR; 77 runs	DD; 5 wickets	KT; 5 wickets	FB; 18 runs	CV; 12 runs	KT; 6 wickets	Eliminated				6th

Team's results→	Won	Tied	Lost	N/R

== League stage ==
=== Phase 1 (Dhaka) ===
Match 1
19 January 2024
14:00
Scorecard

Comilla Victorians; 143/6 (20 overs)	v	Durdanto Dhaka; 147/5 (19.3 overs)
Imrul Kayes 66 (56); Shoriful Islam 3/27 (4 overs)		Mohammad Naim 52 (40); Tanvir Islam 2/27 (4 overs)

Durdanto Dhaka won by 5 wickets
Sher-e-Bangla National Cricket Stadium, Dhaka
Umpires: David Millns (Eng) and Mahfuzur Rahman (Ban)
Player of the match: Shoriful Islam (Durdanto Dhaka)

- Durdanto Dhaka won the toss and elected to field.
- Musfik Hasan (Comilla Victorians) made his T20 debut.

Match 2
19 January 2024
19:00 (N)
Scorecard

Sylhet Strikers; 177/2 (20 overs)	v	Chattogram Challengers; 180/3 (18.3 overs)
Zakir Hasan 70* (43); Nihaduzzaman 1/31 (4 overs)		Najibullah Zadran 61* (30); Richard Ngarava 1/17 (3 overs)

Chattogram Challengers won by 7 wickets
Sher-e-Bangla National Cricket Stadium, Dhaka
Umpires: Morshed Ali Khan (Ban) and Asif Yaqoob (Pak)
Player of the match: Najibullah Zadran (Chattogram Challengers)

- Chattogram Challengers won the toss and elected to field.

Match 3
20 January 2024
13:30
Scorecard

Rangpur Riders; 134/9 (20 overs)	v	Fortune Barishal; 138/5 (19.1 overs)
Shamim Hossain 34 (33); Khaled Ahmed 4/31 (4 overs)		Tamim Iqbal 35 (24); Shakib Al Hasan 2/16 (4 overs)

Fortune Barishal won by 5 wickets
Sher-e-Bangla National Cricket Stadium, Dhaka
Umpires: Ali Arman (Ban) and Asif Yaqoob (Pak)
Player of the match: Khaled Ahmed (Fortune Barishal)

- Fortune Barishal won the toss and elected to field.

Match 4
20 January 2024
18:30 (N)
Scorecard

Chattogram Challengers; 121 (19.5 overs)	v	Khulna Tigers; 122/6 (18.2 overs)
Shohidul Islam 40 (31); Nahidul Islam 4/12 (4 overs)		Mahmudul Hasan Joy 44 (39); Shohidul Islam 2/26 (4 overs)

Khulna Tigers won by 4 wickets
Sher-e-Bangla National Cricket Stadium, Dhaka
Umpires: Morshed Ali Khan (Ban) and David Millns (Eng)
Player of the match: Nahidul Islam (Khulna Tigers)

- Khulna Tigers won the toss and elected to field.

Match 5
22 January 2024
13:30
Scorecard

Durdanto Dhaka; 136/8 (20 overs)	v	Chattogram Challengers; 137/4 (18.2 overs)
Lasith Croospulle 46 (31); Al-Amin Hossain 2/15 (4 overs)		Tanzid Hasan 49 (40); Shoriful Islam 2/40 (3.2 overs)

Chattogram Challengers won by 6 wickets
Sher-e-Bangla National Cricket Stadium, Dhaka
Umpires: Muhammad Kamruzzaman (Ban) and Asif Yaqoob (Pak)
Player of the match: Tanzid Hasan (Chattogram Challenged)

- Chattogram Challengers won the toss and elected to field.

Match 6
22 January 2024
18:30 (N)
Scorecard

Fortune Barishal; 187/4 (20 overs)	v	Khulna Tigers; 188/2 (18 overs)
Mushfiqur Rahim 68* (39); Mukidul Islam 1/34 (4 overs)		Anamul Haque 64* (44); Mohammad Imran 2/35 (3 overs)

Khulna Tigers won by 8 wickets
Sher-e-Bangla National Cricket Stadium, Dhaka
Umpires: Tanvir Ahmed (Ban) and David Millns (Eng)
Player of the match: Anamul Haque (Khulna Tigers)

- Khulna Tigers won the toss and elected to field.

Match 7
23 January 2024
13:30
Scorecard

Sylhet Strikers; 120/8 (20 overs)	v	Rangpur Riders; 125/6 (18.2 overs)
Benny Howell 37 (32); Mahedi Hasan 2/18 (4 overs)		Babar Azam 56* (49); Dushan Hemantha 3/20 (4 overs)

Rangpur Riders won by 4 wickets
Sher-e-Bangla National Cricket Stadium, Dhaka
Umpires: David Millns (Eng) and Mahfuzur Rahman (Ban)
Player of the match: Azmatullah Omarzai (Rangpur Riders)

- Rangpur Riders won the toss and elected to field.

Match 8
23 January 2024
18:30 (N)
Scorecard

Fortune Barishal; 161/9 (20 overs)	v	Comilla Victorians; 162/6 (19.5 overs)
Mushfiqur Rahim 62 (44); Mustafizur Rahman 3/32 (4 overs)		Imrul Kayes 52 (41); Dunith Wellalage 3/26 (4 overs)

Comilla Victorians won by 4 wickets
Sher-e-Bangla National Cricket Stadium, Dhaka
Umpires: Moniruzzaman (Ban) and Asif Yaqoob (Pak)
Player of the match: Matthew Forde (Comilla Victorians)

- Comilla Victorians won the toss and elected to field.

=== Phase 2 (Sylhet) ===
Match 9
26 January 2024
14:00
Scorecard

Khulna Tigers; 160/6 (20 overs)	v	Rangpur Riders; 132 (18.4 overs)
Mohammad Nawaz 55 (34); Hasan Mahmud 3/29 (4 overs)		Mohammad Nabi 50 (30); Dasun Shanaka 4/16 (3 overs)

Khulna Tigers won by 28 runs
Sylhet International Cricket Stadium, Sylhet
Umpires: Muhammad Kamruzzaman (Ban) and Asif Yaqoob (Pak) Muhammad Kamruzzaman
Player of the match: Dasun Shanaka (Khulna Tigers)

- Rangpur Riders won the toss and elected to field.

Match 10
26 January 2024
19:00 (N)
Scorecard

Comilla Victorians; 130/8 (20 overs)	v	Sylhet Strikers; 78 (16.2 overs)
Imrul Kayes 30 (28); Samit Patel 3/16 (4 overs)		Zakir Hasan 41 (34); Aliss Islam 4/17 (4 overs)

Comilla Victorians won by 52 runs
Sylhet International Cricket Stadium, Sylhet
Umpires: David Millns (Eng) and Mahfuzur Rahman (Ban)
Player of the match: Aliss Islam (Comilla Victorians)

- Sylhet Strikers won the toss and elected to field.

Match 11
27 January 2024
13:30
Scorecard

Chattogram Challengers; 193/4 (20 overs)	v	Fortune Barishal; 183/7 (20 overs)
Avishka Fernando 91* (50); Taijul Islam 2/26 (4 overs)		Ahmed Shehzad 39 (17); Curtis Campher 4/20 (3 overs)

Chattogram Challengers won by 10 runs
Sylhet International Cricket Stadium, Sylhet
Umpires: Morshed Ali Khan (Ban) and David Millns (Eng)
Player of the match: Curtis Campher (Chattogram Challengers)

- Fortune Barishal won the toss and elected to field.

Match 12
27 January 2024
18:30 (N)
Scorecard

Rangpur Riders; 183/8 (20 overs)	v	Durdanto Dhaka; 104 (16.3 overs)
Babar Azam 62 (46); Arafat Sunny 3/32 (4 overs)		Alex Ross 51 (35); Mahedi Hasan 3/11 (3.3 overs)

Rangpur Riders won by 79 runs
Sylhet International Cricket Stadium, Sylhet
Umpires: Tanvir Ahmed (Ban) and Asif Yaqoob (Pak)
Player of the match: Babar Azam (Rangpur Riders)

- Durdanto Dhaka won the toss and elected to field.

Match 13
29 January 2024
13:30
Scorecard

Sylhet Strikers; 137/4 (20 overs)	v	Chattogram Challengers; 138/2 (17.4 overs)
Harry Tector 45 (42); Bilal Khan 3/24 (4 overs)		Tom Bruce 51* (44); Tanzim Hasan Sakib 1/19 (2 overs)

Chattogram Challengers won by 8 wickets
Sylhet International Cricket Stadium, Sylhet
Umpires: David Millns (Eng) and Moniruzzaman (Ban)
Player of the match: Bilal Khan (Chattogram Challengers)

- Sylhet Strikers won the toss and elected to bat.

Match 14
29 January 2024
18:30 (N)
Scorecard

Durdanto Dhaka; 130/9 (20 overs)	v	Khulna Tigers; 131/0 (14.4 overs)
Mohammad Naim 41 (21); Mohammad Nawaz 3/15 (4 overs)		Anamul Haque 58* (48)

Khulna Tigers won by 10 wickets
Sylhet International Cricket Stadium, Sylhet
Umpires: Ali Arman (Ban) and Asif Yaqoob (Pak)
Player of the match: Mohammad Nawaz (Khulna Tigers)

- Durdanto Dhaka won the toss and elected to bat.
- SM Meherob (Durdanto Dhaka) made his T20 debut.

Match 15
30 January 2024
13:30
Scorecard

Rangpur Riders; 165/5 (20 overs)	v	Comilla Victorians; 157/6 (20 overs)
Babar Azam 37 (36); Raymon Reifer 2/20 (3 overs)		Mahidul Islam Ankon 63 (55); Azmatullah Omarzai 2/31 (4 overs)

Rangpur Riders won by 8 runs
Sylhet International Cricket Stadium, Sylhet
Umpires: Muhammad Kamruzzaman (Ban) and Asif Yaqoob (Pak)
Player of the match: Azmatullah Omarzai (Rangpur Riders)

- Rangpur Riders won the toss and elected to bat.

Match 16
30 January 2024
18:30 (N)
Scorecard

Fortune Barishal; 186/5 (20 overs)	v	Sylhet Strikers; 137 (17.3 overs)
Ahmed Shehzad 66 (41); Benny Howell 3/21 (4 overs)		Zakir Hasan 46 (34); Mohammad Imran 4/29 (3.3 overs)

Fortune Barishal won by 49 runs
Sylhet International Cricket Stadium, Sylhet
Umpires: David Millns (Eng) and Mahfuzur Rahman (Ban)
Player of the match: Mahmudullah (Fortune Barishal)

- Fortune Barishal won the toss and elected to bat.

Match 17
2 February 2024
14:00
Scorecard

Sylhet Strikers; 142/8 (20 overs)	v	Durdanto Dhaka; 127/9 (20 overs)
Mohammad Mithun 59 (46); Shoriful Islam 4/24 (4 overs)		Taskin Ahmed 27* (11); Richard Ngarava 4/30 (4 overs)

Sylhet Strikers won by 15 runs
Sylhet International Cricket Stadium, Sylhet
Umpires: Ali Arman (Ban) and Asif Yaqoob (Pak)
Player of the match: Richard Ngarava (Sylhet Strikers)

- Durdanto Dhaka won the toss and elected to field.

Match 18
2 February 2024
19:00 (N)
Scorecard

Chattogram Challengers; 72 (16.3 overs)	v	Comilla Victorians; 73/3 (9.2 overs)
Tom Bruce 27 (20); Tanvir Islam 4/13 (4 overs)		Towhid Hridoy 31 (13); Ziaur Rahman 1/12 (1 over)

Comilla Victorians won by 7 wickets
Sylhet International Cricket Stadium, Sylhet
Umpires: Tanvir Ahmed (Ban) and David Millns (Eng)
Player of the match: Tanvir Islam (Comilla Victorians)

- Comilla Victorians won the toss and elected to field.

Match 19
3 February 2024
13:30
Scorecard

Khulna Tigers; 155/8 (20 overs)	v	Fortune Barishal; 156/5 (19.4 overs)
Mohammad Nawaz 38* (23); Taijul Islam 2/7 (3 overs)		Shoaib Malik 41* (25); Faheem Ashraf 3/18 (4 overs)

Fortune Barishal won by 5 wickets
Sylhet International Cricket Stadium, Sylhet
Umpires: Morshed Ali Khan (Ban) and David Millns (Eng)
Player of the match: Shoaib Malik (Fortune Barishal)

- Fortune Barishal won the toss and elected to field.

Match 20
3 February 2024
18:30 (N)
Scorecard

Rangpur Riders; 162/7 (20 overs)	v	Sylhet Strikers; 85 (16.5 overs)
Babar Azam 47 (37); Samit Patel 2/14 (4 overs)		Ryan Burl 43 (32); Mahedi Hasan 3/13 (3 overs)

Rangpur Riders won by 77 runs
Sylhet International Cricket Stadium, Sylhet
Umpires: Moniruzzaman (Ban) and Asif Yaqoob (Pak)
Player of the match: Nurul Hasan (Rangpur Riders)

- Sylhet Strikers won the toss and elected to field.

=== Phase 3 (Dhaka) ===
Match 21
6 February 2024
13:30
Scorecard

Rangpur Riders; 175/4 (20 overs)	v	Durdanto Dhaka; 115 (18 overs)
Babar Azam 47 (43); Mosaddek Hossain 2/30 (4 overs)		Mohammad Naim 44 (31); Shakib Al Hasan 3/16 (4 overs)

Rangpur Riders won by 60 runs
Sher-e-Bangla National Cricket Stadium, Dhaka
Umpires: Mahfuzur Rahman (Ban) and Asif Yaqoob (Pak)
Player of the match: Shakib Al Hasan (Rangpur Riders)

- Durdanto Dhaka won the toss and elected to field.

Match 22
6 February 2024
18:30 (N)
Scorecard

Chattogram Challengers; 145/5 (20 overs)	v	Fortune Barishal; 129/8 (20 overs)
Tom Bruce 50* (40); Mohammad Imran 2/31 (4 overs)		Tamim Iqbal 49 (46); Shohidul Islam 3/13 (4 overs)

Chattogram Challengers won by 16 runs
Sher-e-Bangla National Cricket Stadium, Dhaka
Umpires: Morshed Ali Khan (Ban) and David Millns (Eng)
Player of the match: Shohidul Islam (Chattogram Challengers)

- Fortune Barishal won the toss and elected to field.

Match 23
7 February 2024
13:30
Scorecard

Comilla Victorians; 149/7 (20 overs)	v	Khulna Tigers; 115 (18.5 overs)
Liton Das 45 (30); Nasum Ahmed 2/21 (4 overs)		Mohammad Wasim 23 (12); Aamer Jamal 5/23 (4 overs)

Comilla Victorians won by 34 runs
Sher-e-Bangla National Cricket Stadium, Dhaka
Umpires: David Millns (Eng) and Moniruzzaman (Ban)
Player of the match: Aamer Jamal (Comilla Victorians)

- Comilla Victorians won the toss and elected to bat.

Match 24
7 February 2024
18:30 (N)
Scorecard

Durdanto Dhaka; 124/8 (20 overs)	v	Sylhet Strikers; 129/5 (19 overs)
Saif Hassan 41 (32); Rejaur Rahman Raja 3/20 (4 overs)		Najmul Hossain Shanto 33 (25); Shoriful Islam 3/27 (4 overs)

Sylhet Strikers won by 5 wickets
Sher-e-Bangla National Cricket Stadium, Dhaka
Umpires: Tanvir Ahmed (Ban) and Mahfuzur Rahman (Ban)
Player of the match: Benny Howell (Sylhet Strikers)

- Sylhet Strikers won the toss and elected to field.

Match 25
9 February 2024
14:00
Scorecard

Khulna Tigers; 153/3 (20 overs)	v	Sylhet Strikers; 159/5 (19 overs)
Anamul Haque 67* (58); Sunzamul Islam 1/16 (4 overs)		Harry Tector 61 (52); Mark Deyal 3/19 (4 overs)

Sylhet Strikers won by 5 wickets
Sher-e-Bangla National Cricket Stadium, Dhaka
Umpires: Mahfuzur Rahman (Ban) and Asif Yaqoob (Pak)
Player of the match: Harry Tector (Sylhet Strikers)

- Khulna Tigers won the toss and elected to bat.

Match 26
9 February 2024
19:00 (N)
Scorecard

Durdanto Dhaka; 175/4 (20 overs)	v	Comilla Victorians; 176/6 (19.5 overs)
Mohammad Naim 64 (45); Matthew Forde 3/35 (4 overs)		Towhid Hridoy 108* (57); Shoriful Islam 2/32 (4 overs)

Comilla Victorians won by 4 wickets
Sher-e-Bangla National Cricket Stadium, Dhaka
Umpires: Tanvir Ahmed (Ban) and David Millns (Eng)
Player of the match: Towhid Hridoy (Comilla Victorians)

- Durdanto Dhaka won the toss and elected to bat.

Match 27
10 February 2024
13:30
Scorecard

Rangpur Riders; 211/3 (20 overs)	v	Chattogram Challengers; 158/6 (20 overs)
Reeza Hendricks 58 (41); Salauddin Sakil 2/15 (2 overs)		Shykat Ali 63 (45); Shakib Al Hasan 2/24 (4 overs)

Rangpur Riders won by 53 runs
Sher-e-Bangla National Cricket Stadium, Dhaka
Umpires: Moniruzzaman (Ban) and Asif Yaqoob (Pak)
Player of the match: James Neesham (Rangpur Riders)

- Rangpur Riders won the toss and elected to bat.

Match 28
10 February 2024
18:30 (N)
Scorecard

Fortune Barishal; 189/4 (20 overs)	v	Durdanto Dhaka; 149 (19.4 overs)
Soumya Sarkar 75* (48); Taskin Ahmed 2/35 (4 overs)		Alex Ross 52 (30); Mohammad Saifuddin 3/21 (4 overs)

Fortune Barishal won by 40 runs
Sher-e-Bangla National Cricket Stadium, Dhaka
Umpires: David Millns (Eng) and Mahfuzur Rahman (Ban)
Player of the match: Soumya Sarkar (Fortune Barishal)

- Fortune Barishal won the toss and elected to bat.

=== Phase 4 (Chattogram) ===
Match 29
13 February 2024
13:30
Scorecard

Comilla Victorians; 239/3 (20 overs)	v	Chattogram Challengers; 166 (16.3 overs)
Will Jacks 108* (53); Shohidul Islam 2/49 (4 overs)		Tanzid Hasan 41 (24); Rishad Hossain 4/22 (4 overs)

Comilla Victorians won by 73 runs
Zohur Ahmed Chowdhury Stadium, Chattogram
Umpires: Deighton Butler (WI) and Masudur Rahman (Ban)
Player of the match: Will Jacks (Comilla Victorians)

- Chattogram Challengers won the toss and elected to field.

Match 30
13 February 2024
18:30 (N)
Scorecard

Rangpur Riders; 219/5 (20 overs)	v	Khulna Tigers; 141 (18.2 overs)
Shakib Al Hasan 69 (31); Luke Wood 3/19 (4 overs)		Alex Hales 60 (33); Imran Tahir 5/26 (4 overs)

Rangpur Riders won by 78 runs
Zohur Ahmed Chowdhury Stadium, Chattogram
Umpires: David Millns (Eng) and Mahfuzur Rahman (Ban)
Player of the match: Imran Tahir (Rangpur Riders)

- Rangpur Riders won the toss and elected to bat.

Match 31
14 February 2024
13:30
Scorecard

Fortune Barishal; 186/6 (20 overs)	v	Durdanto Dhaka; 159/8 (20 overs)
Tamim Iqbal 71 (45); Alauddin Babu 3/30 (4 overs)		Alex Ross 89* (49); Khaled Ahmed 3/26 (4 overs)

Fortune Barishal won by 27 runs
Zohur Ahmed Chowdhury Stadium, Chattogram
Umpires: David Millns (Eng) and Gazi Sohel (Ban)
Player of the match: Tamim Iqbal (Fortune Barishal)

- Fortune Barishal won the toss and elected to bat.
- Tamim Iqbal (Fortune Barishal) became the first Bangladeshi batter to hit 100 sixes in BPL.

Match 32
14 February 2024
18:30 (N)
Scorecard

Khulna Tigers; 164/8 (20 overs)	v	Comilla Victorians; 168/3 (16.3 overs)
Evin Lewis 36 (20); Matthew Forde 2/36 (4 overs)		Towhid Hridoy 91*; Mukidul Islam 1/28 (2 overs)

Comilla Victorians won by 7 wickets
Zohur Ahmed Chowdhury Stadium, Chattogram
Umpires: Tanvir Ahmed (Ban) and Deighton Butler (WI)
Player of the match: Towhid Hridoy (Comilla Victorians)

- Khulna Tigers won the toss and elected to bat.

Match 33
16 February 2024
14:00
Scorecard

Durdanto Dhaka; 128/7 (20 overs)	v	Khulna Tigers; 131/5 (15.2 overs)
Mosaddek Hossain 26 (23); Mukidul Islam 3/18 (4 overs)		Afif Hossain 43* (21); Shoriful Islam 2/17 (3.2 overs)

Khulna Tigers won by 5 wickets
Zohur Ahmed Chowdhury Stadium, Chattogram
Umpires: David Millns (Eng) and Masudur Rahman (Ban)
Player of the match: Wayne Parnell (Khulna Tigers)

- Durdanto Dhaka won the toss and elected to bat.
- Arif Ahmed (Khulna Tigers) made his T20 debut.

Match 34
16 February 2024
19:00 (N)
Scorecard

Rangpur Riders; 187/8 (20 overs)	v	Chattogram Challengers; 169/6 (20 overs)
Shakib Al Hasan 62 (39); Romario Shepherd 3/27 (4 overs)		Romario Shepherd 66* (30); Dwaine Pretorius 3/14 (4 overs)

Rangpur Riders won by 18 runs
Zohur Ahmed Chowdhury Stadium, Chattogram
Umpires: Deighton Butler (WI) and Gazi Sohel (Ban)
Player of the match: Mahedi Hasan (Rangpur Riders)

- Rangpur Riders won the toss and elected to bat.

Match 35
17 February 2024
13:30
Scorecard

Fortune Barishal; 183/6 (20 overs)	v	Sylhet Strikers; 165/8 (20 overs)
Mushfiqur Rahim 52 (32); Tanzim Hasan Sakib 3/48 (4 overs)		Ariful Haque 57 (31); Kyle Mayers 3/12 (4 overs)

Fortune Barishal won by 18 runs
Zohur Ahmed Chowdhury Stadium, Chattogram
Umpires: Tanvir Ahmed (Ban) and Deighton Butler (WI)
Player of the match: Kyle Mayers (Fortune Barishal)

- Fortune Barishal won the toss and elected to bat.
- Mushfiqur Rahim (Fortune Barishal) hit 100th six in BPL, second Bangladeshi batter to do so.

Match 36
17 February 2024
18:30 (N)
Scorecard

Chattogram Challengers; 159/6 (20 overs)	v	Durdanto Dhaka; 149/5 (20 overs)
Tanzid Hasan 70 (51); Shoriful Islam 2/17 (4 overs)		Alex Ross 55 (44); Shuvagata Hom 2/12 (3 overs)

Chattogram Challengers won by 10 runs
Zohur Ahmed Chowdhury Stadium, Chattogram
Umpires: David Millns (Eng) and Mahfuzur Rahman (Ban)
Player of the match: Tanzid Hasan (Chattogram Challengers)

- Chattogram Challengers won the toss and elected to bat.
- Mohammad Anamul Haque (Durdanto Dhaka) made his T20 debut.

Match 37
19 February 2024
13:30
Scorecard

Sylhet Strikers; 177/5 (20 overs)	v	Comilla Victorians; 165/6 (20 overs)
Benny Howell 62* (31); Sunil Narine 2/16 (4 overs)		Liton Das 85 (58); Tanzim Hasan Sakib 3/33 (3 overs)

Sylhet Strikers won by 12 runs
Zohur Ahmed Chowdhury Stadium, Chattogram
Umpires: Deighton Butler (WI) and Gazi Sohel (Ban)
Player of the match: Benny Howell (Sylhet Strikers)

- Sylhet Strikers won the toss and elected to bat.

Match 38
19 February 2024
18:30 (N)
Scorecard

Fortune Barishal; 151/9 (20 overs)	v	Rangpur Riders; 155/9 (19.3 overs)
Kyle Mayers 46 (27); Abu Hider 5/12 (4 overs)		Brandon King 45 (22); Mehidy Hasan Miraz 3/24 (4 overs)

Rangpur Riders won by 1 wicket
Zohur Ahmed Chowdhury Stadium, Chattogram
Umpires: Tanvir Ahmed (Ban) and David Millns (Eng)
Player of the match: Abu Hider (Rangpur Riders)

- Fortune Barishal won the toss and elected to bat.

Match 39
20 February 2024
13:30
Scorecard

Chattogram Challengers; 192/4 (20 overs)	v	Khulna Tigers; 127 (19.5 overs)
Tanzid Hasan 116 (65); Wayne Parnell 1/27 (4 overs)		Anamul Haque 35 (24); Shuvagata Hom 3/25 (4 overs)

Chattogram Challengers won by 65 runs
Zohur Ahmed Chowdhury Stadium, Chattogram
Umpires: Morshed Ali Khan (Ban) and David Millns (Eng)
Player of the match: Tanzid Hasan (Chattogram Challengers)

- Chattogram Challengers won the toss and elected to bat.

Match 40
20 February 2024
18:30 (N)
Scorecard

Rangpur Riders; 150 (19.5 overs)	v	Comilla Victorians; 151/4 (17.3 overs)
James Neesham 69* (42); Musfik Hasan 3/18 (4 overs)		Andre Russell 43* (12); Shakib Al Hasan 3/20 (4 overs)

Comilla Victorians won by 6 wickets
Zohur Ahmed Chowdhury Stadium, Chattogram
Umpires: Deighton Butler (WI) and Masudur Rahman (Ban)
Player of the match: Andre Russell (Comilla Victorians)

- Comilla Victorians won the toss and elected to field.

=== Phase 5 (Dhaka) ===
Match 41
23 February 2024
14:00
Scorecard

Comilla Victorians; 140/8 (20 overs)	v	Fortune Barishal; 141/4 (19.4 overs)
Jaker Ali 38* 16; Taijul Islam 3/20 (3 overs)		Tamim Iqbal 66 (48); Musfik Hasan 2/19 (3.4 overs)

Fortune Barishal won by 6 wickets
Sher-e-Bangla National Cricket Stadium, Dhaka
Umpires: Deighton Butler (WI) and Gazi Sohel (Ban)
Player of the match: Tamim Iqbal (Fortune Barishal)

- Fortune Barishal won the toss and elected to field.

Match 42
23 February 2024
19:00 (N)
Scorecard

Khulna Tigers; 128/8 (20 overs)	v	Sylhet Strikers; 130/4 (18 overs)
Afif Hossain 52 (35); Benny Howell 3/15 (4 overs)		Yasir Ali 46 (43); Nahidul Islam 1/11 (4 overs)

Sylhet Strikers won by 6 wickets
Sher-e-Bangla National Cricket Stadium, Dhaka
Umpires: Tanvir Ahmed (Ban) and David Millns (Eng)
Player of the match: Benny Howell (Sylhet Strikers)

- Sylhet Strikers won the toss and elected to field.

== Play-offs ==
Qualifier 1
26 February 2024 — Dhaka
1	Rangpur Riders	185/6 (20 overs)
2	Comilla Victorians	186/4 (18.3 overs)
Eliminator
26 February 2024 — Dhaka
3	Fortune Barishal	136/3 (14.5 overs)
4	Chattogram Challengers	135/9 (20 overs)

Qualifier 2
28 February 2024 — Dhaka
Q1L	Rangpur Riders	149/7 (20 overs)
EW	Fortune Barishal	152/4 (18.3 overs)

Final
1 March 2024 — Dhaka
Q1W	Comilla Victorians	154/6 (20 overs)
Q2W	Fortune Barishal	157/4 (19 overs)

=== Eliminator ===
Match 43
26 February 2024
13:30
Scorecard

Chattogram Challengers; 135/9 (20 overs)	v	Fortune Barishal; 136/3 (14.5 overs)
Josh Brown 34 (22); Kyle Mayers 2/28 (4 overs); Mohammad Saifuddin 2/28 (4 overs)		Tamim Iqbal 52* (43); Romario Shepherd 1/17 (3 overs)

Fortune Barishal won by 7 wickets
Sher-e-Bangla National Cricket Stadium, Dhaka
Umpires: David Millns (Eng) and Masudur Rahman (Ban)
Player of the match: Kyle Mayers (Fortune Barishal)

- Fortune Barishal won the toss and elected to field.

=== Qualifiers ===
==== Qualifier 1 ====
Match 44
26 February 2024
18:30 (N)
Scorecard

Rangpur Riders; 185/6 (20 overs)	v	Comilla Victorians; 186/4 (18.3 overs)
James Neesham 97* (49); Andre Russell 2/37 (4 overs)		Liton Das 83 (57); Fazalhaq Farooqi 2/27 (3.3 overs)

Comilla Victorians won by 6 wickets
Sher-e-Bangla National Cricket Stadium, Dhaka
Umpires: Deighton Butler (WI) and Sharfuddoula (Ban)
Player of the match: Liton Das (Comilla Victorians)

- Comilla Victorians won the toss and elected to field.

==== Qualifier 2 ====
Match 45
28 February 2024
18:30 (N)
Scorecard

Rangpur Riders; 149/7 (20 overs)	v	Fortune Barishal; 152/4 (18.3 overs)
Shamim Hossain 59* (24); James Fuller 3/25 (4 overs)		Mushfiqur Rahim 47* (38); Abu Hider 2/37 (4 overs)

Fortune Barishal won by 6 wickets
Sher-e-Bangla National Cricket Stadium, Dhaka
Umpires: Deighton Butler (WI) and Gazi Sohel (Ban)
Player of the match: Mushfiqur Rahim (Fortune Barishal)

- Fortune Barishal won the toss and elected to field.

=== Final ===
Match 46
1 March 2024
18:30 (N)
Scorecard

Comilla Victorians; 154/6 (20 overs)	v	Fortune Barishal; 157/4 (19 overs)
Mahidul Islam Ankon 38 (35); James Fuller 2/43 (4 overs)		Kyle Mayers 46 (30); Moeen Ali 2/28 (4 overs)

Fortune Barishal won by 6 wickets
Sher-e-Bangla National Cricket Stadium, Dhaka
Umpires: David Millns (Eng) and Sharfuddoula (Ban)
Player of the match: Kyle Mayers (Fortune Barishal)

- Fortune Barishal won the toss and elected to field.

== Statistics ==
=== Most Runs ===
Player	Team	Innings	Runs	Average	High score
Tamim Iqbal	Fortune Barishal	15	492	35.14	71
Towhid Hridoy	Comilla Victorians	14	462	38.50	108*
Litton Das	Comilla Victorians	14	391	27.92	85
Tanzid Hasan	Chattogram Challengers	12	384	32	116
Mushfiqur Rahim	Fortune Barishal	15	380	31.66	68*

- Source: ESPNCricinfo

=== Most Wickets ===
Player	Team	Matches	Wickets	Best bowling
Shoriful Islam	Durdanto Dhaka	12	22	4/24
Shakib Al Hasan	Rangpur Riders	13	17	3/16
Mahedi Hasan	Rangpur Riders	14	16	3/11
Mohammad Saifuddin	Fortune Barishal	9	15	3/21
Bilal Khan	Chattogram Challengers	13	15	3/24

- Source: ESPNCricinfo

=== Highest team totals ===
Team	Scores	Opponent	Result	Date	Venue
Comilla Victorians	239/3	Chattogram Challengers	Won by 73 runs	13 February 2024	Chattogram
Rangpur Riders	219/5	Khulna Tigers	Won by 78 runs	13 February 2024	Chattogram
Rangpur Riders	211/3	Chattogram Challengers	Won by 53 runs	10 February 2024	Dhaka
Chattogram Challengers	193/4	Fortune Barishal	Won by 10 runs	27 January 2024	Sylhet
Chattogram Challengers	192/4	Khulna Tigers	Won by 65 runs	20 February 2024	Chattogram

- Source: ESPNCricinfo

== Awards ==
Awards	Awardee (Team)	Performance	Prize	Ref
Player of the match in the Final	Kyle Mayers (Fortune Barishal)	1/26 and 46 (30)	৳5 lakh (US$4,100)	
Best Fielder of the tournament	Mohammad Naim (Durdanto Dhaka)	8 catches (12 innings)	৳3 lakh (US$2,400)	
Highest Wicket-taker of the tournament	Shoriful Islam (Durdanto Dhaka)	22 wickets (12 innings)	৳5 lakh (US$4,100)	
Highest run-getter of the tournament	Tamim Iqbal (Fortune Barishal)	492 runs (15 innings)	৳5 lakh (US$4,100)	
Player of the tournament	Tamim Iqbal (Fortune Barishal)	492 runs; 4 catches (15 innings)	৳10 lakh (US$8,100)	
Runners-up	Comilla Victorians	—	৳1 crore (US$81,000)	
Champion	Fortune Barishal	—	৳2 crore (US$160,000)	
