= 2019–20 National Cricket League =

Cricket tournament

- Dates: 10 October – 19 November 2019
- Administrator: Bangladesh Cricket Board
- Cricket format: First-class
- Tournament format: Double round-robin
- Champions: Khulna Division (7th title)
- Participants: 8
- Matches: 24
- Most runs: Taibur Rahman (523)
- Most wickets: Abdur Razzak (31)

The 2019–20 National Cricket League was the twenty-first edition of the National Cricket League (NCL), a first-class cricket competition that was held in Bangladesh. The tournament started on 10 October 2019, with eight teams placed into two tiers. The matches were used as the national team's preparation for their Test series against India in November 2019. Rajshahi Division were the defending champions.

On 5 November 2019, Abdur Razzak took his 600th first-class wicket, becoming the first Bangladeshi bowler to reach the milestone. On 18 November 2019, Shahadat Hossain of Dhaka Division was withdrawn mid-way through the match with Khulna Division, after he physically assaulted teammate Arafat Sunny. Shahadat initially faced a ban from cricket of up to one year. However, he was given a five-year ban, with two years suspended for the incident.

Khulna Division won the tournament, beating Dhaka Division by nine wickets in the final round of matches. It was their seventh win, a record for victories in the NCL. In Tier 2, Sylhet Division secured promotion to Tier 1, after beating Chittagong Division, also by the margin of nine wickets. Defending champions, Rajshahi Division, finished bottom of Tier 1 and were relegated to Tier 2.

== Fixtures ==
=== Tier 1 ===
Points table

Teams	Pld	W	L	D	A	Pts
Khulna Division	6	3	0	3	0	39.81
Dhaka Division	6	1	1	4	0	24.39
Rangpur Division	6	1	2	3	0	21.46
Rajshahi Division	6	1	3	2	0	18.65

- 2019–20 Champions
- Bottom placed team relegated to Tier 2 for 2020–21 National Cricket League.

10–13 October 2019
Scorecard

Dhaka Division	v	Rajshahi Division
240 (76.1 overs); Taibur Rahman 88* (123); Taijul Islam 4/92 (28 overs)		197 (77.5 overs); Mushfiqur Rahim 75 (116); Sumon Khan 5/50 (27 overs)
254 (99.2 overs); Taibur Rahman 88 (195); Taijul Islam 5/105 (41.2 overs)		106/5 (64 overs); Jahurul Islam 40* (181); Sumon Khan 2/21 (15 overs)

Match drawn
Khan Shaheb Osman Ali Stadium, Fatullah
Umpires: Tanvir Ahmed and Masudur Rahman
Player of the match: Taibur Rahman (Dhaka Division)

- Rajshahi Division won the toss and elected to field.
- Shakil Hossain (Dhaka Division) made his first-class debut.

10–13 October 2019
Scorecard

Rangpur Division	v	Khulna Division
227 (100.1 overs); Tanbir Hayder 64 (162); Abdur Razzak 4/81 (32 overs)		454/9d (138.3 overs); Imrul Kayes 202* (319); Sohrawordi Shuvo 3/74 (23.3 overs)
33/1 (9 overs); Nasir Hossain 23* (35); Al-Amin Hossain 1/10 (5 overs)

Match drawn
Sheikh Abu Naser Stadium, Khulna
Umpires: Mahfuzur Rahman and Gazi Sohel
Player of the match: Imrul Kayes (Khulna Division)

- Khulna Division won the toss and elected to field.
- No play was possible on day one due to rain.
- Imran Uzzaman (Khulna Division) made his first-class debut.

17–20 October 2019
Scorecard

Rajshahi Division	v	Khulna Division
261 (85.3 overs); Junaid Siddique 51 (137); Mehidy Hasan Miraz 4/38 (21.3 overs)		309 (108.3 overs); Imrul Kayes 93 (190); Shafiul Islam 3/55 (17 overs)
170 (60 overs); Najmul Hossain Shanto 57 (82); Al-Amin Hossain 4/17 (9 overs)		123/3 (22.1 overs); Soumya Sarkar 50* (59); Shafiul Islam 1/15 (5 overs)

Khulna Division won by 7 wickets
Sheikh Abu Naser Stadium, Khulna
Umpires: Mahfuzur Rahman and Masudur Rahman
Player of the match: Nurul Hasan (Khulna Division)

- Khulna Division won the toss and elected to field.

17–20 October 2019
Scorecard

Dhaka Division	v	Rangpur Division
556/8d (160 overs); Saif Hassan 220* (329); Sanjit Saha 3/89 (25 overs)		508 (180.5 overs); Naeem Islam 135 (324); Salauddin Sakil 3/85 (27 overs)
10/0 (3 overs); Nazmul Islam 9* (13)

Match drawn
Zohur Ahmed Chowdhury Stadium, Chittagong
Umpires: Ali Arman and Gazi Sohel
Player of the match: Saif Hassan (Dhaka Division)

- Dhaka Division won the toss and elected to bat.

26–29 October 2019
Scorecard

Rajshahi Division	v	Rangpur Division
201 (71.4 overs); Farhad Hossain 60 (113); Rishad Hossain 5/50 (20 overs)		274 (118.5 overs); Mehedi Maruf 78 (232); Sunzamul Islam 3/86 (39.5 overs)
190 (102.1 overs); Sunzamul Islam 36 (87); Tanbir Hayder 3/30 (23.1 overs)		111 (60.4 overs); Naeem Islam 36 (138); Saqlain Sajib 5/35 (26 overs)

Rajshahi Division won by 6 runs
Sheikh Kamal International Cricket Stadium Academy Ground, Cox's Bazar
Umpires: Tanvir Ahmed and Gazi Sohel
Player of the match: Sunzamul Islam (Rajshahi Division)

- Rajshahi Division won the toss and elected to bat.
- Mohimenul Khan (Rajshahi Division) and Mukidul Islam (Rangpur Division) both made their first-class debuts.

26–29 October 2019
Scorecard

Khulna Division	v	Dhaka Division
371 (111.1 overs); Anamul Haque 126 (224); Taibur Rahman 3/41 (11.1 overs)		316 (110 overs); Rony Talukdar 73 (126); Mahedi Hasan 4/92 (30 overs)
301/3d (77 overs); Anamul Haque 151* (225); Nazmul Islam 2/105 (33 overs)		119/7 (57 overs); Nadif Chowdhury 37 (55); Mahedi Hasan 5/46 (25 overs)

Match drawn
Sheikh Kamal International Cricket Stadium Academy Ground, Cox's Bazar
Umpires: Masudur Rahman and Ali Arman
Player of the match: Anamul Haque (Khulna Division)

- Khulna Division won the toss and elected to bat.

2–5 November 2019
Scorecard

Rangpur Division	v	Khulna Division
224 (81.1 overs); Rishad Hossain 42 (32); Abdur Razzak 7/69 (24.1 overs)		233 (71 overs); Mahedi Hasan 119 (150); Robiul Haque 5/41 (18 overs)
211 (76.5 overs); Nasir Hossain 76 (136); Abdur Razzak 5/71 (27.5 overs)		203/9 (62.4 overs); Mahedi Hasan 56 (89); Sohrawordi Shuvo 6/55 (18.4 overs)

Khulna Division won by 1 wicket
Sher-e-Bangla National Cricket Stadium, Mirpur
Umpires: Tanvir Ahmed and Moniruzzaman
Player of the match: Mahedi Hasan (Khulna Division)

- Khulna Division won the toss and elected to field.
- Khulna Division became the first team in fifteen years to win a first-class match in the NCL by one wicket.

2–5 November 2019
Scorecard

Rajshahi Division	v	Dhaka Division
230 (86.1 overs); Najmul Hossain Shanto 56 (108); Sumon Khan 3/43 (15.1 overs)		475/7d (136.1 overs); Shuvagata Hom 104 (186); Sunzamul Islam 4/162 (47 overs)
241 (97.2 overs); Sabbir Rahman 58 (102); Saif Hassan 3/15 (6.2 overs)

Dhaka Division won by an innings and 4 runs
Sheikh Kamal International Cricket Stadium Academy Ground, Cox's Bazar
Umpires: Mahfuzur Rahman and Masudur Rahman
Player of the match: Shuvagata Hom (Dhaka Division)

- Rajshahi Division won the toss and elected to bat.

9–12 November 2019
Scorecard

Rajshahi Division	v	Khulna Division
151 (50.4 overs); Sunzamul Islam 48 (49); Rubel Hossain 7/51 (17.4 overs)		201 (73.1 overs); Amit Majumder 59 (130); Farhad Reza 6/48 (20.1 overs)
191/7 (61 overs); Avishek Mitra 51 (110); Abdur Razzak 4/69 (26 overs)

Match drawn
Sher-e-Bangla National Cricket Stadium, Mirpur
Umpires: Morshed Ali Khan and Gazi Sohel
Player of the match: Rubel Hossain (Khulna Division)

- Khulna Division won the toss and elected to field.
- No play was possible on day 1 due to rain.

9–12 November 2019
Scorecard

Rangpur Division	v	Dhaka Division
234 (81.3 overs); Nasir Hossain 70 (158); Nazmul Islam 5/65 (34 overs)		222 (64.1 overs); Raqibul Hasan 67 (111); Mukidul Islam 5/37 (17 overs)
271/9d (99 overs); Nasir Hossain 161* (283); Shahadat Hossain 2/24 (12 overs)		176/4 (63 overs); Raqibul Hasan 80* (173); Nasir Hossain 1/10 (2 overs)

Match drawn
Shaheed Chandu Stadium, Bogra
Umpires: Mahfuzur Rahman and Mozahiduzzaman
Player of the match: Nasir Hossain (Rangpur Division)

- Dhaka Division won the toss and elected to field.

16–19 November 2019
Scorecard

Rangpur Division	v	Rajshahi Division
274 (89.4 overs); Sohrawordi Shuvo 105 (217); Delwar Hossain 4/59 (21.3 overs)		254 (86.2 overs); Farhad Hossain 75 (129); Ariful Haque 6/41 (23.2 overs)
228/6d (61 overs); Tanbir Hayder 72 (145); Delwar Hossain 4/73 (16 overs)		93 (43.1 overs); Junaid Siddique 34 (121); Ariful Haque 3/20 (12 overs)

Rangpur Division won by 155 runs
Shahid Kamruzzaman Stadium, Rajshahi
Umpires: Mozahiduzzaman and Sohrab Hossain
Player of the match: Ariful Haque (Rangpur Division)

- Rajshahi Division won the toss and elected to field.

16–19 November 2019
Scorecard

Dhaka Division	v	Khulna Division
279 (93.1 overs); Taibur Rahman 110 (189); Abdul Halim 5/27 (16.1 overs)		379 (128 overs); Nurul Hasan 150* (227); Shuvagata Hom 5/46 (26 overs)
216 (86.3 overs); Raqibul Hasan 99 (227); Ziaur Rahman 5/44 (23.3 overs)		117/1 (25.4 overs); Anamul Haque 79* (76); Nazmul Islam 1/49 (12 overs)

Khulna Division won by 9 wickets
Sheikh Abu Naser Stadium, Khulna
Umpires: Sharfuddoula and Imran Parvez
Player of the match: Nurul Hasan (Khulna Division)

- Khulna Division won the toss and elected to field.
- Shafiul Hayet (Dhaka Division) and Tipu Sultan (Khulna Division) both made their first-class debuts.

=== Tier 2 ===
Points table

Team	Pld	W	L	D	A	Pts
Sylhet Division	6	3	2	1	0	36.05
Dhaka Metropolis	6	1	1	4	0	25.79
Barisal Division	6	1	1	4	0	21.35
Chittagong Division	6	1	2	3	0	20.92

- Top placed team promoted to Tier 1 for 2020–21 National Cricket League.

10–13 October 2019
Scorecard

Sylhet Division	v	Barisal Division
86 (43.1 overs); Zakir Hasan 32 (63); Kamrul Islam Rabbi 6/24 (16.1 overs)		231/8d (58.3 overs); Fazle Mahmud 70 (92); Rejaur Rahman Raja 3/74 (17 overs)
132 (63.5 overs); Jaker Ali 45* (114); Tanvir Islam 4/29 (13 overs)

Barisal Division won by an innings and 13 runs
Shahid Kamruzzaman Stadium, Rajshahi
Umpires: Shafiuddin Ahmed and Imran Parvez
Player of the match: Kamrul Islam Rabbi (Barisal Division)

- Barisal Division won the toss and elected to field.
- No play was possible on day one due to rain.
- Rejaur Rahman Raja (Sylhet Division) made his first-class debut.

10–13 October 2019
Scorecard

Chittagong Division	v	Dhaka Metropolis
290 (122.5 overs); Tasamul Haque 90 (249); Arafat Sunny 6/87 (39.5 overs)		354 (126.4 overs); Zabid Hossain 85 (228); Minhajul Abedin Afridi 3/103 (30 overs)
227/5 (76 overs); Masum Khan 61* (123); Mahmudullah 3/25 (13 overs)

Match drawn
Sher-e-Bangla National Cricket Stadium, Mirpur
Umpires: Morshed Ali Khan and Nadir Shah
Player of the match: Mahmudullah (Dhaka Metropolis)

- Chittagong Division won the toss and elected to bat.
- Masum Khan, Minhajul Abedin Afridi, Mehedi Hasan and Noman Chowdhury (Chittagong Division) all made their first-class debuts.

17–20 October 2019
Scorecard

Dhaka Metropolis	v	Sylhet Division
246 (83.4 overs); Mahmudullah 63 (108); Rejaur Rahman 4/75 (19 overs)		319 (84.5 overs); Zakir Hasan 71 (115); Abu Hider 5/55 (16.5 overs)
273 (119 overs); Mahmudullah 111 (243); Abu Jayed 4/49 (25 overs)		204/2 (52.3 overs); Imtiaz Hossain 110* (178); Manik Khan 1/25 (5.3 overs)

Sylhet Division won by 8 wickets
Shaheed Chandu Stadium, Bogra
Umpires: Imran Parvez and Moniruzzaman
Player of the match: Zakir Hasan (Sylhet Division)

- Sylhet Division won the toss and elected to field.
- Aminul Islam and Manik Khan (Dhaka Metropolis) both made their first-class debuts.

17–20 October 2019
Scorecard

Chittagong Division	v	Barisal Division
356 (134.3 overs); Mahidul Islam Ankon 91 (158); Monir Hossain 4/99 (34.3 overs)		216 (82.3 overs); Nuruzzaman 60 (107); Nayeem Hasan 4/62 (28.3 overs)
195/6d (47 overs); Pinak Ghosh 54 (74); Kamrul Islam Rabbi 2/43 (16 overs)		174/7 (65 overs); Mohammad Ashraful 60 (108); Nayeem Hasan 4/54 (29 overs)

Match drawn
Khan Shaheb Osman Ali Stadium, Fatullah
Umpires: Tanvir Ahmed and Shafiuddin Ahmed
Player of the match: Nayeem Hasan and Mahidul Islam Ankon (Chittagong Division)

- Barisal Division won the toss and elected to field.

26–29 October 2019
Scorecard

Barisal Division	v	Dhaka Metropolis
312/5d (72.4 overs); Mohammad Ashraful 150* (204); Sharifullah 3/114 (26.4 overs)		34/0d (12 overs); Rakin Ahmed 17* (30)

Match drawn
Shaheed Chandu Stadium, Bogra
Umpires: Imran Parvez and Mahfuzur Rahman
Player of the match: Mohammad Ashraful (Barisal Division)

- Dhaka Metropolis won the toss and elected to field.
- No play was possible on days 1, 2 and 3 due to rain.

26–29 October 2019
Scorecard

Sylhet Division	v	Chittagong Division
163 (44.2 overs); Alok Kapali 42 (45); Ifran Hossain 6/57 (13.2 overs)		229/9d (43.2 overs); Pinak Ghosh 100 (83); Abu Jayed 4/86 (16 overs)
109 (39 overs); Alok Kapali 31 (58); Mehedi Hasan Rana 5/30 (14 overs)		45/1 (6.4 overs); Irfan Sukkur 26* (16); Shahanur Rahman 1/9 (3 overs)

Chittagong Division won by 9 wickets
Shahid Kamruzzaman Stadium, Rajshahi
Umpires: Mozahiduzzaman and Moniruzzaman
Player of the match: Ifran Hossain (Chittagong Division)

- Chittagong Division won the toss and elected to field.
- No play was possible on days 1 and 2 due to rain.

2–5 November 2019
Scorecard

Barisal Division	v	Sylhet Division
162 (57.1 overs); Nuruzzaman 40 (99); Ebadot Hossain 5/36 (16 overs)		322 (113.1 overs); Shanaj Ahmed 73 (182); Monir Hossain 3/69 (33 overs)
128 (45.1 overs); Sohag Gazi 37 (55); Nasum Ahmed 4/5 (4.1 overs)

Sylhet Division won by an innings and 32 runs
Sheikh Kamal International Cricket Stadium Academy Ground, Cox's Bazar
Umpires: Ali Arman and Gazi Sohel
Player of the match: Ebadot Hossain (Sylhet Division)

- Barisal Division won the toss and elected to bat.

2–5 November 2019
Scorecard

Dhaka Metropolis	v	Chittagong Division
403 (108.4 overs); Shadman Islam 178 (276); Hasan Mahmud 3/72 (18 overs)		91 (30.5 overs); Sadikur Rahman 22 (23); Sharifullah 4/30 (15 overs)
		248 (80.2 overs) (f/o); Yasir Ali 66 (100); Shohidul Islam 4/29 (13.2 overs)

Dhaka Metropolis won by an innings and 64 runs
Zohur Ahmed Chowdhury Stadium, Chittagong
Umpires: Mohammad Kamruzzaman and Mozahiduzzaman
Player of the match: Shohidul Islam (Dhaka Metropolis)

- Dhaka Metropolis won the toss and elected to bat.

9–12 November 2019
Scorecard

Barisal Division	v	Chittagong Division
70/3d (13 overs); Sohag Gazi 44 (30); Ifran Hossain 2/13 (5 overs)		45/0 (6 overs); Pinak Ghosh 30* (15)

Match drawn
Barisal Divisional Stadium, Barisal
Umpires: Shafiuddin Ahmed and Habibur Rahman

- Barisal Division won the toss and elected to bat.
- No play was possible on days 1, 2 and 3 due to rain.
- Alvi Haque (Chittagong Division) made his first-class debut.

9–12 November 2019
Scorecard

Dhaka Metropolis	v	Sylhet Division
311/8d (83.5 overs); Shamsur Rahman 114 (193); Rejaur Rahman 5/60 (23.5 overs)		351 (101.3 overs); Amite Hasan 125 (124); Shohidul Islam 3/63 (23 overs)
395/6d (101 overs); Marshall Ayub 163 (212); Alok Kapali 2/59 (23 overs)		187/4 (49 overs); Towfiq Khan 75 (80); Taskin Ahmed 3/24 (11 overs)

Match drawn
Shahid Kamruzzaman Stadium, Rajshahi
Umpires: Sharfuddoula and Imran Parvez
Player of the match: Amite Hasan (Sylhet Division)

- Sylhet Division won the toss and elected to field.
- Amite Hasan, Asadulla Al Galib and Ahemd Abidul Haque (Sylhet Division) all made their first-class debuts.

16–19 November 2019
Scorecard

Barisal Division	v	Dhaka Metropolis
414 (108.2 overs); Fazle Mahmud 141 (168); Taskin Ahmed 4/67 (23.2 overs)		466 (140.3 overs); Marshall Ayub 109 (170); Sohag Gazi 3/98 (31.3 overs)
269 (84 overs); Moin Khan 80 (105); Arafat Sunny 5/85 (32 overs)		19/1 (5 overs); Azmir Ahmed 10 (13); Kamrul Islam Rabbi 1/12 (3 overs)

Match drawn
Sher-e-Bangla National Cricket Stadium, Mirpur
Umpires: Abdullah Al Matin and Habibur Rahman
Player of the match: Fazle Mahmud (Barisal Division)

- Barisal Division won the toss and elected to bat.

16–19 November 2019
Scorecard

Chittagong Division	v	Sylhet Division
106 (35.1 overs); Irfan Sukkur 21 (41); Ruyel Miah 8/26 (14.1 overs)		230 (65 overs); Amite Hasan 55 (63); Ifran Hossain 6/95 (22 overs)
165 (51.1 overs); Irfan Sukkur 66 (116); Ruyel Miah 5/39 (15.1 overs)		45/1 (5.5 overs); Shanaj Ahmed 18* (16); Ifran Hossain 1/19 (2 overs)

Sylhet Division won by 9 wickets
Shaheed Chandu Stadium, Bogra
Umpires: Shafiuddin Ahmed and Asadur Rahman
Player of the match: Ruyel Miah (Sylhet Division)

- Sylhet Division won the toss and elected to field.
