= 2021 Dhaka Premier Division Twenty20 Cricket League =

Cricket tournament

- Dates: 31 May 2021 – 26 June 2021
- Administrator: Bangladesh Cricket Board
- Cricket format: Twenty20
- Tournament format: Round-robin
- Champions: Abahani Limited (1st title)
- Participants: 12
- Matches: 84
- Player of the series: Nurul Hasan
- Most runs: Mizanur Rahman (418)
- Most wickets: Mohammad Saifuddin (26)

The 2021 Dhaka Premier Division Twenty20 Cricket League was the second edition of the Dhaka Premier Division Twenty20 Cricket League, a Twenty20 cricket competition that was held in Bangladesh. The tournament replaced the 2019–20 Dhaka Premier Division Cricket League, which was postponed due to the COVID-19 pandemic, and featured the same twelve teams playing in the Twenty20 format instead of the List A format.

Originally, the tournament was scheduled to start on 6 May 2021. However, in April 2021, the tournament was postponed until 31 May 2021, due to the nationwide lockdown. In May 2021, the Bangladesh Cricket Board (BCB) announced that the tournament would be used as the preparation for the 2021 ICC Men's T20 World Cup, and the home series against Australia, England and New Zealand. All the matches of the tournament were broadcast on the BCB's official YouTube channel. All the matches of the second round of the league were abandoned and all the remaining matches were moved forward by one day due to rain. On 4 June 2021, BCB announced the revised fixtures from fourth to seventh round. On 17 June 2021, the dates of Super League fixture were announced, where top six teams of Group stage points table were advanced to the next round.

Abahani Limited won the tournament after finishing top of the Super League phase of the competition. Meanwhile, Old DOHS Sports Club and Partex Sporting Club were both relegated, after finishing in the bottom two places of the Relegation League, with Legends of Rupganj retaining their place in the Premier Division.

== Teams ==
The following teams played in the tournament:

- Abahani Limited
- Brothers Union
- Gazi Group Cricketers
- Khelaghar Samaj Kallyan Samity
- Legends of Rupganj
- Mohammedan Sporting Club
- Old DOHS Sports Club
- Partex Sporting Club
- Prime Bank Cricket Club
- Prime Doleshwar Sporting Club
- Sheikh Jamal Dhanmondi Club
- Shinepukur Cricket Club

== Points tables ==
Group stage

Teams	Pld	W	L	NR	Pts	NRR
Prime Bank Cricket Club	11	9	2	0	18	+0.943
Prime Doleshwar Sporting Club	11	7	2	2	16	+0.762
Abahani Limited	11	8	3	0	16	+0.573
Gazi Group Cricketers	11	7	4	0	14	+0.176
Mohammedan Sporting Club	11	6	4	1	13	+0.077
Sheikh Jamal Dhanmondi Club	11	6	4	1	13	+0.030
Brothers Union	11	4	4	3	11	+0.290
Shinepukur Cricket Club	11	4	6	1	9	–0.072
Khelaghar Samaj Kallyan Samity	11	4	7	0	8	–0.367
Legends of Rupganj	11	3	7	1	7	–0.684
Old DOHS Sports Club	11	2	7	2	6	–0.302
Partex Sporting Club	11	0	10	1	1	–1.507

Teams qualified for the Super League phase of the tournament.

Teams qualified for the Relegation League play-offs phase of the tournament.

Super League

Team	Pld	W	L	NR	Pts	NRR
Abahani Limited	16	12	4	0	24	+0.637
Prime Bank Cricket Club	16	11	5	0	22	+0.548
Prime Doleshwar Sporting Club	16	9	4	3	21	+0.526
Gazi Group Cricketers	16	9	6	1	19	+0.248
Sheikh Jamal Dhanmondi Club	16	9	6	1	19	–0.036
Mohammedan Sporting Club	16	7	8	1	15	–0.194

Champions

Relegation League

Team	Pld	W	L	NR	Pts	NRR
Legends of Rupganj	13	5	7	1	11	–0.413
Old DOHS Sports Club	13	3	8	2	8	–0.167
Partex Sporting Club	13	0	12	1	1	–1.490

Teams relegated to the Dhaka First Division Cricket League.

== Fixtures ==
=== Round robin ===
==== Round 1 ====
31 May 2021
09:00
Scorecard

Partex Sporting Club; 120/5 (20 overs)	v	Abahani Limited; 72/3 (9.2 overs)
Tasamul Haque 65* (54); Taijul Islam 2/12 (4 overs)		Mushfiqur Rahim 38* (26); Imran Ali 1/11 (2 overs); Shahbaz Chouhan 1/11 (2 overs)

Abahani Limited won by 7 wickets (DLS method)
Sher-e-Bangla National Cricket Stadium, Dhaka
Umpires: Tanvir Ahmed and Mahfuzur Rahman
Player of the match: Mushfiqur Rahim (Abahani Limited)

- Partex Sporting Club won the toss and elected to bat.
- Abahani Limited were set a revised target of 70 runs from 10 overs due to rain.
- Imran Ali, Shafiul Hayet, Jaynul Islam, Moin Khan and Abbas Musa (Partex Sporting Club) all made their T20 debuts.

31 May 2021
09:00
Scorecard

Old DOHS Sports Club; 171/4 (20 overs)	v	Legends of Rupganj
Mahmudul Hasan Joy 78* (55); Sabbir Rahman 1/10 (2 overs)

No result
Bangladesh Krira Shikkha Protisthan No 3 Ground, Savar
Umpires: Morshed Ali Khan and Sohrab Hossain

- Old DOHS Sports Club won the toss and elected to bat.
- No further play was possible due to rain.
- Rakin Ahmed, Rakibul Islam, Pritom Kumar and Rayan Rahman (Old DOHS Sports Club) all made their T20 debuts.

31 May 2021
09:00
Scorecard

Brothers Union; 127/7 (18.4 overs)	v	Prime Doleshwar Sporting Club
Junaid Siddique 48 (50); Kamrul Islam Rabbi 2/24 (3.4 overs)

No result
Bangladesh Krira Shikkha Protisthan No 4 Ground, Savar
Umpires: Moniruzzaman and Gazi Sohel

- Brothers Union won the toss and elected to bat.
- No further play was possible due to rain.
- Rahatul Ferdous (Brothers Union) and Imran Uzzaman (Prime Doleshwar Sporting Club) both made their T20 debuts.

31 May 2021
13:30
Scorecard

Sheikh Jamal Dhanmondi Club; 166/6 (20 overs)	v	Khelaghar Samaj Kallyan Samity; 144/8 (20 overs)
Shykat Ali 38 (26); Khaled Ahmed 2/20 (4 overs)		Imtiaz Hossain 26 (20); Elias Sunny 3/18 (4 overs)

Sheikh Jamal Dhanmondi Club won by 22 runs
Sher-e-Bangla National Cricket Stadium, Dhaka
Umpires: Mozahiduzzaman and Habibur Rahman
Player of the match: Elias Sunny (Sheikh Jamal Dhanmondi Club)

- Sheikh Jamal Dhanmondi Club won the toss and elected to bat.
- Abdul Halim (Sheikh Jamal Dhanmondi Club) made his T20 debut.

31 May 2021
13:30
Scorecard

Gazi Group Cricketers; 91/5 (12 overs)	v	Prime Bank Cricket Club; 92/3 (9.2 overs)
Zakir Hasan 26* (22); Nayeem Hasan 2/12 (2 overs)		Tamim Iqbal 46 (22); Mahedi Hasan 2/18 (3 overs)

Prime Bank Cricket Club won by 7 wickets
Bangladesh Krira Shikkha Protisthan No 3 Ground, Savar
Umpires: Shafiuddin Ahmed and Masudur Rahman
Player of the match: Tamim Iqbal (Prime Bank Cricket Club)

- Prime Bank Cricket Club won the toss and elected to field.
- The match was reduced to 12 overs per side due to rain.

31 May 2021
13:30
Scorecard

Shinepukur Cricket Club; 125/6 (20 overs)	v	Mohammedan Sporting Club; 129/7 (19.5 overs)
Tanzid Hasan 30 (30); Yeasin Arafat 2/24 (4 overs)		Parvez Hossain Emon 39 (33); Sumon Khan 2/27 (4 overs)

Mohammedan Sporting Club won by 3 wickets
Bangladesh Krira Shikkha Protisthan No 4 Ground, Savar
Umpires: Ali Arman and Imran Parvez
Player of the match: Shakib Al Hasan (Mohammedan Sporting Club)

- Mohammedan Sporting Club won the toss and elected to field.
- Yeasin Arafat (Mohammedan Sporting Club), Mrittunjoy Chowdhury and Iftekhar Sajjad (Shinepukur Cricket Club) all made their T20 debuts.

==== Round 2 ====
2 June 2021
09:00
Scorecard

Prime Doleshwar Sporting Club; 149/6 (20 overs)	v	Khelaghar Samaj Kallyan Samity; 130 (20 overs)
Imran Uzzaman 40 (17); Khaled Ahmed 2/30 (4 overs)		Rishad Hossain 37 (19); Rejaur Rahman Raja 2/22 (4 overs); Enamul Haque 2/22 (4 overs)

Prime Doleshwar Sporting Club won by 19 runs
Sher-e-Bangla National Cricket Stadium, Dhaka
Umpires: Shafiuddin Ahmed and Asadur Rahman
Player of the match: Imran Uzzaman (Prime Doleshwar Sporting Club)

- Khelaghar Samaj Kallyan Samity won the toss and elected to field.

2 June 2021
13:30
Scorecard

Sheikh Jamal Dhanmondi Club; 151/7 (20 overs)	v	Gazi Group Cricketers; 156/3 (18.5 overs)
Mohammad Ashraful 41 (35); Mahmudullah 2/23 (3 overs)		Mahmudullah 62* (51); Mohammad Enamul 2/21 (3 overs)

Gazi Group Cricketers won by 7 wickets
Sher-e-Bangla National Cricket Stadium, Dhaka
Umpires: Morshed Ali Khan and Mahfuzur Rahman
Player of the match: Mahmudullah (Gazi Group Cricketers)

- Gazi Group Cricketers won the toss and elected to field.

2 June 2021
18:00 (N)
Scorecard

Shinepukur Cricket Club; 119 (20 overs)	v	Prime Bank Cricket Club; 120/7 (19.3 overs)
Towhid Hridoy 29 (25); Nayeem Hasan 3/24 (4 overs)		Tamim Iqbal 32 (27); Tanvir Islam 3/12 (4 overs)

Prime Bank Cricket Club won by 3 wickets
Sher-e-Bangla National Cricket Stadium, Dhaka
Umpires: Sohrab Hossain and Masudur Rahman
Player of the match: Nayeem Hasan (Prime Bank Cricket Club)

- Prime Bank Cricket Club won the toss and elected to field.

3 June 2021
09:00
Scorecard

Legends of Rupganj; 111 (19.1 overs)	v	Brothers Union; 112/2 (15.3 overs)
Naeem Islam 38 (28); Alauddin Babu 4/21 (3.1 overs)		Mizanur Rahman 74 (52); Mohammad Shahid 1/24 (2 overs)

Brothers Union won by 8 wickets
Sher-e-Bangla National Cricket Stadium, Dhaka
Umpires: Tanvir Ahmed and Ali Arman
Player of the match: Alauddin Babu (Brothers Union)

- Legends of Rupganj won the toss and elected to bat.
- Nuruzzaman (Brothers Union) made his T20 debut.
- Alauddin Babu (Brothers Union) took a hat-trick.

3 June 2021
13:30
Scorecard

Abahani Limited; 135/6 (19 overs)	v	Old DOHS Sports Club; 113/3 (19 overs)
Mohammad Saifuddin 40 (19); Rakibul Hasan 2/10 (3 overs)		Rakin Ahmed 43 (44); Arafat Sunny 1/13 (4 overs)

Abahani Limited won by 22 runs (DLS method)
Sher-e-Bangla National Cricket Stadium, Dhaka
Umpires: Mozahiduzzaman and Imran Parvez
Player of the match: Mohammad Saifuddin (Abahani Limited)

- Old DOHS Sports Club won the toss and elected to field.
- The match was reduced to 19 overs per side due to rain.
- Mohammad Santo (Old DOHS Sports Club) made his T20 debut.

3 June 2021
18:00 (N)
Scorecard

Partex Sporting Club; 157/5 (20 overs)	v	Mohammedan Sporting Club; 158/4 (17.4 overs)
Abbas Musa 64 (44); Taskin Ahmed 2/33 (4 overs)		Irfan Sukkur 52* (29); Tasamul Haque 3/18 (3 overs)

Mohammedan Sporting Club won by 6 wickets
Sher-e-Bangla National Cricket Stadium, Dhaka
Umpires: Moniruzzaman and Gazi Sohel
Player of the match: Irfan Sukkur (Mohammedan Sporting Club)

- Partex Sporting Club won the toss and elected to bat.

==== Round 3 ====
4 June 2021
09:00
Scorecard

Legends of Rupganj; 138/5 (20 overs)	v	Khelaghar Samaj Kallyan Samity; 140/3 (19.3 overs)
Al-Amin 51 (42); Masum Khan 2/34 (4 overs)		Mehidy Hasan 54 (45); Muktar Ali 1/22 (4 overs)

Khelaghar Samaj Kallyan Samity won by 7 wickets
Sher-e-Bangla National Cricket Stadium, Dhaka
Umpires: Tanvir Ahmed and Mozahiduzzaman
Player of the match: Jahurul Islam (Khelaghar Samaj Kallyan Samity)

- Khelaghar Samaj Kallyan Samity won the toss and elected to field.

4 June 2021
13:30
Scorecard

Shinepukur Cricket Club; 137/5 (20 overs)	v	Sheikh Jamal Dhanmondi Club; 127 (19.5 overs)
Robiul Islam Robi 34* (26); Ziaur Rahman 2/16 (4 overs)		Elias Sunny 30 (25); Tanvir Islam 3/8 (4 overs)

Shinepukur Cricket Club won by 10 runs
Sher-e-Bangla National Cricket Stadium, Dhaka
Umpires: Habibur Rahman and Mahfuzur Rahman
Player of the match: Tanvir Islam (Shinepukur Cricket Club)

- Shinepukur Cricket Club won the toss and elected to bat.
- Amite Hasan (Shinepukur Cricket Club) made his T20 debut.

4 June 2021
18:00 (N)
Scorecard

Prime Doleshwar Sporting Club; 144/6 (20 overs)	v	Gazi Group Cricketers; 108 (18.5 overs)
Fazle Mahmud 39 (31); Nasum Ahmed 2/11 (2 overs)		Ariful Haque 37 (34); Enamul Haque 2/10 (3 overs)

Prime Doleshwar Sporting Club won by 36 runs
Sher-e-Bangla National Cricket Stadium, Dhaka
Umpires: Ali Arman and Gazi Sohel
Player of the match: Shamim Hossain (Prime Doleshwar Sporting Club)

- Prime Doleshwar Sporting Club won the toss and elected to bat.
- Towfiq Khan (Prime Doleshwar Sporting Club) made his T20 debut.

5 June 2021
09:00
Scorecard

Partex Sporting Club; 77/4 (15 overs)	v	Old DOHS Sports Club; 78/0 (11.3 overs)
Tasamul Haque 18 (25); Rakibul Hasan 2/8 (3 overs)		Rakin Ahmed 43* (36)

Old DOHS Sports Club won by 10 wickets
Sher-e-Bangla National Cricket Stadium, Dhaka
Umpires: Moniruzzaman and Masudur Rahman
Player of the match: Rakin Ahmed (Old DOHS Sports Club)

- Old DOHS Sports Club won the toss and elected to field.
- The match was reduced to 15 overs per side due to rain.
- Isharul Islam (Partex Sporting Club) made his T20 debut.

5 June 2021
13:30
Scorecard

Brothers Union; 101/5 (11 overs)	v	Abahani Limited; 102/1 (9.5 overs)
Zahiduzzaman 25* (10); Tanzim Hasan Sakib 3/9 (2 overs)		Mushfiqur Rahim 37* (21); Habibur Rahman 1/19 (2 overs)

Abahani Limited won by 9 wickets
Sher-e-Bangla National Cricket Stadium, Dhaka
Umpires: Sohrab Hossain and Imran Parvez
Player of the match: Tanzim Hasan Sakib (Abahani Limited)

- Abahani Limited won the toss and elected to field.
- The match was reduced to 11 overs per side due to rain.
- Tanzim Hasan Sakib (Abahani Limited) and Abdul Gaffar (Brothers Union) both made their T20 debuts.

5 June 2021
18:00 (N)
Scorecard

Mohammedan Sporting Club; 150/8 (20 overs)	v	Prime Bank Cricket Club; 123 (19.3 overs)
Parvez Hossain Emon 50 (38); Mustafizur Rahman 5/22 (4 overs)		Mohammad Mithun 25 (18); Taskin Ahmed 3/15 (3.3 overs)

Mohammedan Sporting Club won by 27 runs
Sher-e-Bangla National Cricket Stadium, Dhaka
Umpires: Shafiuddin Ahmed and Morshed Ali Khan
Player of the match: Mustafizur Rahman (Prime Bank Cricket Club)

- Mohammedan Sporting Club won the toss and elected to bat.

==== Round 4 ====
7 June 2021
09:00
Scorecard

Khelaghar Samaj Kallyan Samity; 164/6 (20 overs)	v	Abahani Limited; 156/5 (20 overs)
Imtiaz Hossain 66 (46); Mosaddek Hossain 2/24 (3 overs)		Najmul Hossain Shanto 49 (33); Rony Chowdhury 2/23 (3 overs)

Khelaghar Samaj Kallyan Samity won by 8 runs
Bangladesh Krira Shikkha Protisthan No 3 Ground, Savar
Umpires: Sohrab Hossain and Habibur Rahman
Player of the match: Imtiaz Hossain (Khelaghar Samaj Kallyan Samity)

- Khelaghar Samaj Kallyan Samity won the toss and elected to bat.
- Noman Chowdhury and Rony Chowdhury (Khelaghar Samaj Kallyan Samity) both made their T20 debuts.

7 June 2021
09:00
Scorecard

Brothers Union; 139/5 (20 overs)	v	Old DOHS Sports Club; 137/3 (20 overs)
Myshukur Rahaman 68* (48); Aliss Islam 2/23 (4 overs)		Anisul Islam Emon 64 (50); Manik Khan 1/14 (2 overs)

Brothers Union won by 2 runs
Bangladesh Krira Shikkha Protisthan No 4 Ground, Savar
Umpires: Ali Arman and Gazi Sohel
Player of the match: Myshukur Rahaman (Brothers Union)

- Brothers Union won the toss and elected to bat.

7 June 2021
09:00
Scorecard

Shinepukur Cricket Club; 162/7 (20 overs)	v	Prime Doleshwar Sporting Club; 163/6 (19.4 overs)
Mahidul Islam Ankon 44 (32); Shamim Hossain 2/21 (4 overs)		Saif Hassan 50 (35); Mohor Sheikh 2/29 (4 overs)

Prime Doleshwar Sporting Club won by 4 wickets
Sher-e-Bangla National Cricket Stadium, Dhaka
Umpires: Imran Parvez and Mahfuzur Rahman
Player of the match: Farhad Reza (Prime Doleshwar Sporting Club)

- Shinepukur Cricket Club won the toss and elected to bat.

7 June 2021
13:30
Scorecard

Prime Bank Cricket Club; 167/5 (20 overs)	v	Partex Sporting Club; 95 (17.2 overs)
Mohammad Mithun 57* (36); Jubair Hossain 1/22 (3 overs)		Abbas Musa 29 (13); Rubel Hossain 4/30 (4 overs)

Prime Bank Cricket Club won by 72 runs
Bangladesh Krira Shikkha Protisthan No 3 Ground, Savar
Umpires: Mozahiduzzaman and Masudur Rahman
Player of the match: Mohammad Mithun (Prime Bank Cricket Club)

- Prime Bank Cricket Club won the toss and elected to bat.
- Mehrab Hossain and Rajibul Islam (Partex Sporting Club) both made their T20 debuts.

7 June 2021
13:30
Scorecard

Legends of Rupganj; 132/8 (20 overs)	v	Gazi Group Cricketers; 133/3 (17.5 overs)
Mehedi Maruf 24 (24); Mahmudullah 2/19 (4 overs)		Soumya Sarkar 53 (43); Nabil Samad 1/12 (2 overs)

Gazi Group Cricketers won by 7 wickets
Bangladesh Krira Shikkha Protisthan No 4 Ground, Savar
Umpires: Tanvir Ahmed and Shyful Islam
Player of the match: Mahmudullah (Gazi Group Cricketers)

- Gazi Group Cricketers won the toss and elected to field.
- Rakibul Atik (Gazi Group Cricketers) made his T20 debut.

7 June 2021
13:30
Scorecard

Sheikh Jamal Dhanmondi Club; 161/5 (20 overs)	v	Mohammedan Sporting Club; 145/8 (20 overs)
Nurul Hasan 66* (34); Shakib Al Hasan 2/12 (4 overs)		Nadif Chowdhury 57 (43); Mohammad Enamul 3/13 (3 overs)

Sheikh Jamal Dhanmondi Club won by 16 runs
Sher-e-Bangla National Cricket Stadium, Dhaka
Umpires: Shafiuddin Ahmed and Moniruzzaman
Player of the match: Nurul Hasan (Sheikh Jamal Dhanmondi Club)

- Sheikh Jamal Dhanmondi Club won the toss and elected to field.

==== Round 5 ====
8 June 2021
09:00
Scorecard

Legends of Rupganj; 81/6 (12 overs)	v	Shinepukur Cricket Club; 67/6 (12 overs)
Sunzamul Islam 24 (17); Sumon Khan 3/20 (3 overs)		Mahidul Islam Ankon 30 (23); Nabil Samad 3/1 (2 overs)

Legends of Rupganj won by 14 runs
Sher-e-Bangla National Cricket Stadium, Dhaka
Umpires: Sohrab Hossain and Mozahiduzzaman
Player of the match: Nabil Samad (Legends of Rupganj)

- Shinepukur Cricket Club won the toss and elected to field.
- The match was reduced to 12 overs per side due to rain.

8 June 2021
09:00
Scorecard

Prime Doleshwar Sporting Club; 78/4 (6 overs)	v	Mohammedan Sporting Club; 56/4 (6 overs)
Imran Uzzaman 41 (14); Abu Jayed 2/4 (1 over)		Shakib Al Hasan 22 (14); Shafiul Islam 3/22 (2 overs)

Prime Doleshwar Sporting Club won by 22 runs
Bangladesh Krira Shikkha Protisthan No 4 Ground, Savar
Umpires: Ali Arman and Masudur Rahman
Player of the match: Imran Uzzaman (Prime Doleshwar Sporting Club)

- Mohammedan Sporting Club won the toss and elected to field.
- The match was reduced to 6 overs per side due to rain.

8 June 2021
09:00
Scorecard

Old DOHS Sports Club; 120/4 (13 overs)	v	Khelaghar Samaj Kallyan Samity; 103/5 (13 overs)
Anisul Islam Emon 44 (27); Khaled Ahmed 3/24 (3 overs)		Jahurul Islam 37* (24); Rakibul Hasan 2/16 (3 overs)

Old DOHS Sports Club won by 16 runs
Bangladesh Krira Shikkha Protisthan No 3 Ground, Savar
Umpires: Shafiuddin Ahmed and Gazi Sohel
Player of the match: Anisul Islam Emon (Old DOHS Sports Club)

- Khelaghar Samaj Kallyan Samity won the toss and elected to field.
- The match was reduced to 13 overs per side due to rain.

8 June 2021
13:30
Scorecard

Gazi Group Cricketers; 150/8 (20 overs)	v	Abahani Limited; 153/3 (18 overs)
Soumya Sarkar 67 (50); Aminul Islam 2/19 (4 overs)		Mushfiqur Rahim 53* (35); Mahedi Hasan 1/12 (3 overs)

Abahani Limited won by 7 wickets
Sher-e-Bangla National Cricket Stadium, Dhaka
Umpires: Imran Parvez and Mahfuzur Rahman
Player of the match: Mushfiqur Rahim (Abahani Limited)

- Abahani Limited won the toss and elected to field.

8 June 2021
13:30
Scorecard

Sheikh Jamal Dhanmondi Club; 133/9 (20 overs)	v	Prime Bank Cricket Club; 134/3 (19.3 overs)
Suhrawadi Shuvo 34 (30); Rubel Hossain 2/28 (4 overs)		Rony Talukdar 48 (34); Salauddin Sakil 2/12 (2 overs)

Prime Bank Cricket Club won by 7 wickets
Bangladesh Krira Shikkha Protisthan No 4 Ground, Savar
Umpires: Tanvir Ahmed and Shyful Islam
Player of the match: Rony Talukdar (Prime Bank Cricket Club)

- Sheikh Jamal Dhanmondi Club won the toss and elected to bat.

8 June 2021
13:30
Scorecard

Brothers Union; 147/8 (20 overs)	v	Partex Sporting Club; 114 (19.5 overs)
Rahatul Ferdous 54 (44); Tasamul Haque 2/18 (4 overs)		Dhiman Ghosh 44 (37); Rahatul Ferdous 4/34 (4 overs)

Brothers Union won by 33 runs
Bangladesh Krira Shikkha Protisthan No 3 Ground, Savar
Umpires: Moniruzzaman and Asadur Rahman
Player of the match: Rahatul Ferdous (Brothers Union)

- Brothers Union won the toss and elected to bat.

==== Round 6 ====
10 June 2021
09:00
Scorecard

Old DOHS Sports Club; 136/7 (20 overs)	v	Gazi Group Cricketers; 139/4 (19 overs)
Mahmudul Hasan Joy 85* (55); Nasum Ahmed 2/10 (4 overs)		Soumya Sarkar 37 (35); Rakibul Hasan 2/21 (4 overs)

Gazi Group Cricketers won by 6 wickets
Sher-e-Bangla National Cricket Stadium, Dhaka
Umpires: Moniruzzaman and Imran Parvez
Player of the match: Mahmudul Hasan Joy (Old DOHS Sports Club)

- Gazi Group Cricketers won the toss and elected to field.
- Mohiuddin Tareq (Gazi Group Cricketers) made his T20 debut.

10 June 2021
09:00
Scorecard

Prime Bank Cricket Club; 151/7 (20 overs)	v	Prime Doleshwar Sporting Club; 148/9 (20 overs)
Mohammad Mithun 55 (50); Kamrul Islam Rabbi 2/22 (4 overs)		Kamrul Islam Rabbi 38* (12); Mustafizur Rahman 3/25 (4 overs)

Prime Bank Cricket Club won by 3 runs
Bangladesh Krira Shikkha Protisthan No 3 Ground, Savar
Umpires: Ali Arman and Masudur Rahman
Player of the match: Mohammad Mithun (Prime Bank Cricket Club)

- Prime Bank Cricket Club won the toss and elected to bat.

10 June 2021
09:00
Scorecard

Partex Sporting Club; 104 (19.3 overs)	v	Sheikh Jamal Dhanmondi Club; 105/4 (17.2 overs)
Abbas Musa 20 (22); Salauddin Sakil 5/16 (3.3 overs)		Nurul Hasan 30 (32); Jaynul Islam 2/26 (3.2 overs)

Sheikh Jamal Dhanmondi Club won by 6 wickets
Bangladesh Krira Shikkha Protisthan No 4 Ground, Savar
Umpires: Tanvir Ahmed and Asadur Rahman
Player of the match: Salauddin Sakil (Sheikh Jamal Dhanmondi Club)

- Sheikh Jamal Dhanmondi Club won the toss and elected to field.

10 June 2021
13:30
Scorecard

Abahani Limited; 183/5 (20 overs)	v	Shinepukur Cricket Club; 123/5 (17 overs)
Mohammad Naim 70 (50); Tanvir Islam 4/23 (4 overs)		Towhid Hridoy 36 (32); Mohammad Saifuddin 3/12 (3 overs)

Abahani Limited won by 25 runs (DLS method)
Bangladesh Krira Shikkha Protisthan No 4 Ground, Savar
Umpires: Sohrab Hossain and Mozahiduzzaman
Player of the match: Mohammad Naim (Abahani Limited)

- Shinepukur Cricket Club won the toss and elected to field.
- Shinepukur Cricket Club were set a revised target of 149 runs from 17 overs due to rain.
- Aks Swadhin (Abahani Limited), Rahmat Ali and Sheikh Jubayer Hassan (Shinepukur Cricket Club) all made their T20 debuts.

10 June 2021
13:30
Scorecard

Brothers Union; 134/5 (20 overs)	v	Khelaghar Samaj Kallyan Samity; 109/3 (16.2 overs)
Mizanur Rahman 66 (61); Rishad Hossain 2/14 (3 overs)		Mehidy Hasan 40* (40); Rahatul Ferdous 1/17 (4 overs)

Khelaghar Samaj Kallyan Samity won by 5 runs (DLS method)
Bangladesh Krira Shikkha Protisthan No 3 Ground, Savar
Umpires: Shyful Islam and Mahfuzur Rahman
Player of the match: Mizanur Rahman (Brothers Union)

- Brothers Union won the toss and elected to bat.
- Khelaghar Samaj Kallyan Samity were set a revised target of 105 runs from 16.2 overs due to rain.

10 June 2021
13:30
Scorecard

Mohammedan Sporting Club; 113/9 (20 overs)	v	Legends of Rupganj; 117/1 (18.1 overs)
Shuvagata Hom 52 (32); Naeem Islam 2/6 (2 overs)		Pinak Ghosh 51* (51); Mahmudul Hasan 1/11 (3 overs)

Legends of Rupganj won by 9 wickets
Sher-e-Bangla National Cricket Stadium, Dhaka
Umpires: Shafiuddin Ahmed and Gazi Sohel
Player of the match: Sohag Gazi (Legends of Rupganj)

- Mohammedan Sporting Club won the toss and elected to bat.

==== Round 7 ====
11 June 2021
09:00
Scorecard

Prime Bank Cricket Club; 169/5 (20 overs)	v	Legends of Rupganj; 68 (18 overs)
Anamul Haque 58* (46); Muktar Ali 3/28 (4 overs)		Jaker Ali 16 (15); Nahidul Islam 3/15 (4 overs)

Prime Bank Cricket Club won by 101 runs
Sher-e-Bangla National Cricket Stadium, Dhaka
Umpires: Tanvir Ahmed and Moniruzzaman
Player of the match: Nahidul Islam (Prime Bank Cricket Club)

- Legends of Rupganj won the toss and elected to field.

11 June 2021
09:00
Scorecard

Prime Doleshwar Sporting Club; 166/5 (20 overs)	v	Sheikh Jamal Dhanmondi Club; 167/7 (20 overs)
Imran Uzzaman 65 (46); Elias Sunny 2/25 (4 overs)		Ziaur Rahman 53 (33); Kamrul Islam Rabbi 4/24 (4 overs)

Sheikh Jamal Dhanmondi Club won by 3 wickets
Bangladesh Krira Shikkha Protisthan No 4 Ground, Savar
Umpires: Shyful Islam and Mozahiduzzaman
Player of the match: Ziaur Rahman (Sheikh Jamal Dhanmondi Club)

- Prime Doleshwar Sporting Club won the toss and elected to bat.
- Towker Khan (Prime Doleshwar Sporting Club) made his T20 debut.

11 June 2021
09:00
Scorecard

Old DOHS Sports Club; 119/6 (20 overs)	v	Shinepukur Cricket Club; 120/3 (19.1 overs)
Mohammad Rakib 57* (57); Sumon Khan 2/24 (4 overs)		Tanzid Hasan 79* (59); Asaduzzaman Payel 2/18 (4 overs)

Shinepukur Cricket Club won by 7 wickets
Bangladesh Krira Shikkha Protisthan No 3 Ground, Savar
Umpires: Masudur Rahman and Barkatulylah Turkey
Player of the match: Tanzid Hasan (Shinepukur Cricket Club)

- Shinepukur Cricket Club won the toss and elected to field.
- Shanaj Ahmed (Old DOHS Sports Club) made his T20 debut.

11 June 2021
13:30
Scorecard

Mohammedan Sporting Club; 145/6 (20 overs)	v	Abahani Limited; 44/6 (9 overs)
Shakib Al Hasan 37 (27); Aks Swadhin 3/24 (3 overs)		Mushfiqur Rahim 18* (18); Shuvagata Hom 3/17 (3 overs)

Mohammedan Sporting Club won by 31 runs (DLS method)
Sher-e-Bangla National Cricket Stadium, Dhaka
Umpires: Imran Parvez and Mahfuzur Rahman
Player of the match: Shuvagata Hom (Mohammedan Sporting Club)

- Mohammedan Sporting Club won the toss and elected to bat.
- Abahani Limited were set a revised target of 76 runs from 9 overs due to rain.

11 June 2021
13:30
Scorecard

Gazi Group Cricketers; 173/6 (20 overs)	v	Brothers Union; 85/5 (11.2 overs)
Mahedi Hasan 47 (21); Alauddin Babu 4/25 (4 overs)		Sujon Hawlader 26 (16); Nasum Ahmed 3/16 (3 overs)

Gazi Group Cricketers won by 15 runs (DLS method)
Bangladesh Krira Shikkha Protisthan No 3 Ground, Savar
Umpires: Shafiuddin Ahmed and Ali Arman
Player of the match: Mahedi Hasan (Gazi Group Cricketers)

- Brothers Union won the toss and elected to field.
- Brothers Union were set a revised target of 101 runs from 11.2 overs due to rain.

11 June 2021
13:30
Scorecard

Partex Sporting Club; 106/8 (20 overs)	v	Khelaghar Samaj Kallyan Samity; 50/2 (7 overs)
Rajibul Islam 28* (26); Ifran Hossain 3/23 (4 overs)		Imtiaz Hossain 27 (15); Nihaduzzaman 1/10 (1 over)

Khelaghar Samaj Kallyan Samity won by 15 runs (DLS method)
Bangladesh Krira Shikkha Protisthan No 4 Ground, Savar
Umpires: Asadur Rahman and Gazi Sohel
Player of the match: Mehidy Hasan (Khelaghar Samaj Kallyan Samity)

- Partex Sporting Club won the toss and elected to field.
- Khelaghar Samaj Kallyan Samity were set a revised target of 36 runs from 7 overs due to rain.
- Shahriar Komol (Khelaghar Samaj Kallyan Samity) and Joyraz Sheik (Partex Sporting Club) both made their T20 debuts.

==== Round 8 ====
13 June 2021
09:00
Scorecard

Legends of Rupganj; 137/6 (20 overs)	v	Sheikh Jamal Dhanmondi Club; 127/4 (18 overs)
Sabbir Rahman 41 (31); Salauddin Sakil 2/23 (4 overs)		Nurul Hasan 44* (30); Hossain Ali 2/28 (3 overs)

Sheikh Jamal Dhanmondi Club won by 6 wickets (DLS method)
Bangladesh Krira Shikkha Protisthan No 3 Ground, Savar
Umpires: Sohrab Hossain and Imran Parvez
Player of the match: Shykat Ali (Sheikh Jamal Dhanmondi Club)

- Sheikh Jamal Dhanmondi Club won the toss and elected to field.
- No further play was possible due to rain.

13 June 2021
09:00
Scorecard

Partex Sporting Club; 134/7 (20 overs)	v	Prime Doleshwar Sporting Club; 136/5 (19.2 overs)
Hasanuzzaman 44 (29); Farhad Reza 2/18 (4 overs)		Fazle Mahmud 71 (57); Shahadat Hossain 2/20 (4 overs)

Prime Doleshwar Sporting Club won by 5 wickets
Sher-e-Bangla National Cricket Stadium, Dhaka
Umpires: Mozahiduzzaman and Habibur Rahman
Player of the match: Fazle Mahmud (Prime Doleshwar Sporting Club)

- Prime Doleshwar Sporting Club won the toss and elected to field.

13 June 2021
09:00
Scorecard

Mohammedan Sporting Club; 154/5 (20 overs)	v	Old DOHS Sports Club; 115/4 (16 overs)
Irfan Sukkur 68* (42); Rakibul Hasan 2/30 (4 overs)		Mahmudul Hasan Joy 26 (18); Shuvagata Hom 2/25 (3 overs)

Mohammedan Sporting Club won by 5 runs (DLS method)
Bangladesh Krira Shikkha Protisthan No 4 Ground, Savar
Umpires: Shafiuddin Ahmed and Tanvir Ahmed
Player of the match: Irfan Sukkur (Mohammedan Sporting Club)

- Old DOHS Sports Club won the toss and elected to field.
- No further play was possible due to rain.

13 June 2021
13:30
Scorecard

Abahani Limited; 183/3 (20 overs)	v	Prime Bank Cricket Club; 143/6 (19 overs)
Munim Shahriar 92* (50); Shoriful Islam 2/38 (4 overs)		Tamim Iqbal 55 (41); Aminul Islam 2/20 (3 overs)

Abahani Limited won by 30 runs (DLS method)
Sher-e-Bangla National Cricket Stadium, Dhaka
Umpires: Masudur Rahman and Sharfuddoula
Player of the match: Munim Shahriar (Abahani Limited)

- Abahani Limited won the toss and elected to bat.
- Prime Bank Cricket Club were set a revised target of 174 runs from 19 overs due to rain.

13 June 2021
13:30
Scorecard

Shinepukur Cricket Club; 150/3 (20 overs)	v	Brothers Union; 132/4 (18 overs)
Towhid Hridoy 44* (32); Nuruzzaman 1/6 (1 over)		Mizanur Rahman 79* (56); Tanvir Islam 3/13 (4 overs)

Brothers Union won by 1 run (DLS method)
Bangladesh Krira Shikkha Protisthan No 3 Ground, Savar
Umpires: Shyful Islam and Gazi Sohel
Player of the match: Mizanur Rahman (Brothers Union)

- Shinepukur Cricket Club won the toss and elected to bat.
- No further play was possible due to rain.

13 June 2021
13:30
Scorecard

Khelaghar Samaj Kallyan Samity; 138/8 (20 overs)	v	Gazi Group Cricketers; 144/5 (18.3 overs)
Masum Khan 59 (37); Mominul Haque 2/27 (3 overs)		Mahmudullah 58* (48); Mehidy Hasan 2/21 (2.3 overs)

Gazi Group Cricketers won by 5 wickets
Bangladesh Krira Shikkha Protisthan No 4 Ground, Savar
Umpires: Asadur Rahman and Mahfuzur Rahman
Player of the match: Mahmudullah (Gazi Group Cricketers)

- Khelaghar Samaj Kallyan Samity won the toss and elected to bat.

==== Round 9 ====
14 June 2021
09:00
Scorecard

Prime Doleshwar Sporting Club; 118 (19.5 overs)	v	Legends of Rupganj; 104/8 (20 overs)
Fazle Mahmud 29 (38); Mohammad Shahid 3/28 (3.5 overs)		Al-Amin 30 (33); Kamrul Islam Rabbi 3/15 (4 overs)

Prime Doleshwar Sporting Club won by 14 runs
Bangladesh Krira Shikkha Protisthan No 4 Ground, Savar
Umpires: Mozahiduzzaman and Asadur Rahman
Player of the match: Kamrul Islam Rabbi (Prime Doleshwar Sporting Club)

- Legends of Rupganj won the toss and elected to field.

14 June 2021
09:00
Scorecard

Prime Bank Cricket Club; 147/7 (20 overs)	v	Old DOHS Sports Club; 125 (20 overs)
Rony Talukdar 54 (39); Rakibul Hasan 2/14 (4 overs)		Mahmudul Hasan Joy 26 (27); Shoriful Islam 3/23 (4 overs)

Prime Bank Cricket Club won by 22 runs
Bangladesh Krira Shikkha Protisthan No 3 Ground, Savar
Umpires: Mahfuzur Rahman and Sharfuddoula
Player of the match: Rony Talukdar (Prime Bank Cricket Club)

- Old DOHS Sports Club won the toss and elected to field.

14 June 2021
09:00
Scorecard

Shinepukur Cricket Club; 154/6 (20 overs)	v	Khelaghar Samaj Kallyan Samity; 110/7 (16 overs)
Sajjadul Haque 48 (34); Khaled Ahmed 3/20 (4 overs)		Sadikur Rahman 31 (23); Mohor Sheikh 2/13 (2 overs)

Shinepukur Cricket Club won by 15 runs (DLS method)
Sher-e-Bangla National Cricket Stadium, Dhaka
Umpires: Shafiuddin Ahmed and Tanvir Ahmed
Player of the match: Sajjadul Haque (Shinepukur Cricket Club)

- Khelaghar Samaj Kallyan Samity won the toss and elected to field.
- Khelaghar Samaj Kallyan Samity were set a revised target of 126 runs from 16 overs due to rain.

14 June 2021
13:30
Scorecard

Abahani Limited; 181/4 (18.2 overs)	v	Sheikh Jamal Dhanmondi Club; 98/8 (13 overs)
Munim Shahriar 74 (40); Ebadot Hossain 1/20 (3 overs)		Mohammad Enamul 29* (23); Mehedi Hasan Rana 3/16 (3 overs)

Abahani Limited won by 49 runs
Sher-e-Bangla National Cricket Stadium, Dhaka
Umpires: Masudur Rahman and Gazi Sohel
Player of the match: Munim Shahriar (Abahani Limited)

- Abahani Limited won the toss and elected to bat.
- Sheikh Jamal Dhanmondi Club were set a revised target of 148 runs from 13 overs due to rain.

14 June 2021
13:30
Scorecard

Mohammedan Sporting Club; 143/9 (20 overs)	v	Brothers Union
Abdul Mazid 35 (35); Alauddin Babu 2/27 (4 overs)

No result
Bangladesh Krira Shikkha Protisthan No 4 Ground, Savar
Umpires: Ali Arman and Shyful Islam

- Mohammedan Sporting Club won the toss and elected to bat.
- No further play was possible due to rain.

14 June 2021
13:30
Scorecard

Partex Sporting Club; 109/7 (20 overs)	v	Gazi Group Cricketers; 47/1 (5.3 overs)
Hasanuzzaman 26 (25); Mohiuddin Tareq 3/36 (3 overs)		Mahedi Hasan 33 (13); Moin Khan 1/20 (1.3 overs)

Gazi Group Cricketers won by 9 wickets (DLS method)
Bangladesh Krira Shikkha Protisthan No 3 Ground, Savar
Umpires: Sohrab Hossain and Habibur Rahman
Player of the match: Mahedi Hasan (Gazi Group Cricketers)

- Gazi Group Cricketers won the toss and elected to field.
- No further play was possible due to rain.
- Subroto Shekhar (Partex Sporting Club) made his T20 debut.

==== Round 10 ====
16 June 2021
09:00
Scorecard

Brothers Union; 74/3 (12 overs)	v	Prime Bank Cricket Club; 84/4 (11.4 overs)
Junaid Siddique 24 (28); Shoriful Islam 2/24 (3 overs)		Tamim Iqbal 29 (26); Alauddin Babu 3/19 (3 overs)

Prime Bank Cricket Club won by 6 wickets (DLS Method)
Sher-e-Bangla National Cricket Stadium, Dhaka
Umpires: Mahfuzur Rahman and Barkatulylah Turkey
Player of the match: Alauddin Babu (Brothers Union)

- Prime Bank Cricket Club won the toss and elected to field.
- The match was reduced to 12 overs per side with a revised target due to rain.

16 June 2021
09:00
Scorecard

Sheikh Jamal Dhanmondi Club; 120/8 (13 overs)	v	Old DOHS Sports Club; 104/7 (13 overs)
Shykat Ali 37 (23); Anisul Islam Emon 5/23 (2 overs)		Rayan Rahman 36 (28); Salauddin Sakil 2/20 (3 overs)

Sheikh Jamal Dhanmondi Club won by 16 runs
Bangladesh Krira Shikkha Protisthan No 3 Ground, Savar
Umpires: Mozahiduzzaman and Habibur Rahman
Player of the match: Ziaur Rahman (Sheikh Jamal Dhanmondi Club)

- Sheikh Jamal Dhanmondi Club won the toss elected to bat.
- The match was reduced to 13 overs per side due to rain.

16 June 2021
09:00
Scorecard

Mohammedan Sporting Club; 88/9 (10 overs)	v	Khelaghar Samaj Kallyan Samity; 88/5 (10 overs)
Abdul Mazid 57 (30); Ifran Hossain 4/9 (2 overs)		Masum Khan 33* (17); Taskin Ahmed 2/22 (2 overs)

Match tied (Mohammedan Sporting Club won the Super Over)
Bangladesh Krira Shikkha Protisthan No 4 Ground, Savar
Umpires: Ali Arman and Asadur Rahman
Player of the match: Abdul Mazid (Mohammedan Sporting Club)

- Mohammedan Sporting Club won the toss and elected to bat.
- The match was reduced to 10 overs per side due to rain.
- Super Over: Khelaghor Samaj Kallyan Samity 13/1, Mohammedan Sporting Club 14/1.

16 June 2021
13:30
Scorecard

Prime Doleshwar Sporting Club; 132/9 (20 overs)	v	Abahani Limited; 104 (19.5 overs)
Saif Hassan 58 (49); Mehedi Hasan Rana 3/28 (4 overs)		Afif Hossain 26 (15); Kamrul Islam Rabbi 4/11 (2.5 overs)

Prime Doleshwar Sporting Club won by 28 runs
Sher-e-Bangla National Cricket Stadium, Dhaka
Umpires: Sharfuddoula and Gazi Sohel
Player of the match: Kamrul Islam Rabbi (Prime Doleshwar Sporting Club)

- Prime Doleshwar Sporting Club won the toss and elected to bat.

16 June 2021
13:30
Scorecard

Legends of Rupganj; 131/6 (20 overs)	v	Partex Sporting Club; 110/8 (20 overs)
Sunzamul Islam 30 (23); Rajibul Islam 2/13 (4 overs)		Nazmul Hossain Milon 21 (21); Mohammad Shahid 2/17 (4 overs)

Legends of Rupganj won by 21 runs
Bangladesh Krira Shikkha Protisthan No 4 Ground, Savar
Umpires: Sohrab Hossain and Shyful Islam
Player of the match: Sunzamul Islam (Legends od Rupganj)

- Legends of Rupganj won the toss and elected to bat.

16 June 2021
18:00 (N)
Scorecard

Shinepukur Cricket Club; 107 (19.4 overs)	v	Gazi Group Cricketers; 99 (19.3 overs)
Sabbir Hossain 41 (26); Mahmudullah 3/14 (4 overs)		Nasum Ahmed 17 (12); Mohor Sheikh 4/22 (3.3 overs)

Shinepukur Cricket Club won by 8 runs
Sher-e-Bangla National Cricket Stadium, Dhaka
Umpires: Shafiuddin Ahmed and Tanvir Ahmed
Player of the match: Mohor Sheikh (Shinepukur Cricket Club)

- Shinepukur Cricket Club won the toss and elected to bat.
- Tahjibul Islam (Shinepukur Cricket Club) made his T20 debut.

==== Round 11 ====
17 June 2021
09:00
Scorecard

Khelaghar Samaj Kallyan Samity; 68/5 (10 overs)	v	Prime Bank Cricket Club; 74/5 (9.1 overs)
Shahriar Komol 31* (25); Nahidul Islam 2/12 (3 overs)		Rony Talukdar 39 (19); Ifran Hossain 2/16 (2 overs)

Prime Bank Cricket Club won by 5 wickets (DLS Method)
Sher-e-Bangla National Cricket Stadium, Dhaka
Umpires: Shyful Islam and Mahfuzur Rahman
Player of the match: Rony Talukdar (Prime Bank Cricket Club)

- Khelaghar Samaj Kallyan Samity won the toss and elected to bat.
- The match was reduced to 10 overs per side with a revised target due to rain.

17 June 2021
09:00
Scorecard

Old DOHS Sports Club; 110/3 (15 overs)	v	Prime Doleshwar Sporting Club
Anisul Islam Emon 28 (28); Farhad Reza 2/28 (4 overs)

No result
Bangladesh Krira Shikkha Protisthan No 3 Ground, Savar
Umpires: Habibur Rahman and Barkatulylah Turkey

- Old DOHS Sports Club won the toss and elected to bat.
- No further play was possible due to rain.

17 June 2021
09:00
Scorecard

Brothers Union; 133/2 (17 overs)	v	Sheikh Jamal Dhanmondi Club
Mizanur Rahman 100* (65); Salauddin Sakil 1/31 (3 overs)

No result
Bangladesh Krira Shikkha Protisthan No 4 Ground, Savar
Umpires: Shafiuddin Ahmed and Ali Arman

- Sheikh Jamal Dhanmondi Club won the toss and elected to field.
- No further play was possible due to rain.

17 June 2021
13:30
Scorecard

Shinepukur Cricket Club; 39/1 (5 overs)	v	Partex Sporting Club
Tanzid Hasan 29* (20); Shahadat Hossain 1/10 (2 overs)

No result
Bangladesh Krira Shikkha Protisthan No 4 Ground, Savar
Umpires: Joynal Abedin and Sohrab Hossain

- Shinepukur Cricket Club won the toss ane elected to bat.
- No further play was possible due to rain.

17 June 2021
13:30
Scorecard

Legends of Rupganj; 162/5 (18 overs)	v	Abahani Limited; 164/5 (17.4 overs)
Jaker Ali 52 (42); Mehedi Hasan Rana 3/37 (4 overs)		Mohammad Naim 39* (19); Mohammad Shahid 2/40 (3.4 overs)

Abahani Limited won by 5 wickets (DLS Method)
Sher-e-Bangla National Cricket Stadium, Dhaka
Umpires: Tanvir Ahmed and Gazi Sohel
Player of the match: Mohammad Saifuddin (Abahani Limited)

- Legends of Rupganj won the toss and elected to bat.
- The match was reduced to 18 overs per side due to rain.

17 June 2021
18:00 (N)
Scorecard

Mohammedan Sporting Club; 149/9 (20 overs)	v	Gazi Group Cricketers; 116/3 (11.1 overs)
Shuvagata Hom 42 (20); Mohiuddin Tareq 4/29 (4 overs)		Yasir Ali 45 (25); Abu Hider 1/10 (1 over)

Gazi Group Cricketers won by 7 wickets (DLS Method)
Sher-e-Bangla National Cricket Stadium, Dhaka
Umpires: Mozahiduzzaman and Sharfuddoula
Player of the match: Mohiuddin Tareq (Gazi Group Cricketers)

- Mohammedan Sporting Club won the toss and elected to bat.
- Gazi Group Cricketers were set a revised target of 115 runs from 14 overs due to rain.

=== Super League ===
19 June 2021
09:00
Scorecard

Prime Doleshwar Sporting Club; 8/0 (1.3 overs)	v	Gazi Group Cricketers
Imran Uzzaman 7* (4)

No result
Sher-e-Bangla National Cricket Stadium, Dhaka
Umpires: Mahfuzur Rahman and Gazi Sohel

- Gazi Group Cricketers won the toss and elected to field.
- No further play was possible due to rain.

20–22 June 2021
09:00
Scorecard

Gazi Group Cricketers; 73/4 (12 overs)	v	Prime Doleshwar Sporting Club
Soumya Sarkar 25 (16); Sharifullah 2/18 (4 overs)

No result
Sher-e-Bangla National Cricket Stadium, Dhaka
Umpires: Mahfuzur Rahman and Gazi Sohel

- Prime Doleshwar Sporting Club won the toss and elected to field.
- The match was scheduled to resume on 22 June due to rain. No further play was possible.

20 June 2021
14:00
Scorecard

Prime Bank Cricket Club; 164/3 (20 overs)	v	Sheikh Jamal Dhanmondi Club; 165/3 (18.1 overs)
Mohammad Mithun 67* (42); Elias Sunny 2/29 (4 overs)		Shykat Ali 60 (36); Nahidul Islam 1/23 (4 overs)

Sheikh Jamal Dhanmondi Club won by 7 wickets
Sher-e-Bangla National Cricket Stadium, Dhaka
Umpires: Tanvir Ahmed and Moniruzzaman
Player of the match: Shykat Ali (Sheikh Jamal Dhanmondi Club)

- Sheikh Jamal Dhanmondi Club won the toss and elected to field.

20 June 2021
18:30 (N)
Scorecard

Abahani Limited; 193/7 (20 overs)	v	Mohammedan Sporting Club; 133/7 (20 overs)
Mushfiqur Rahim 57* (32); Ruyel Miah 3/19 (4 overs)		Abu Hider 53* (42); Mosaddek Hossain 2/14 (3 overs)

Abahani Limited won by 60 runs
Sher-e-Bangla National Cricket Stadium, Dhaka
Umpires: Masudur Rahman and Sharfuddoula
Player of the match: Mushfiqur Rahim (Abahani Limited)

- Mohammedan Sporting Club won the toss and elected to field.

21 June 2021
09:00
Scorecard

Sheikh Jamal Dhanmondi Club; 123/9 (20 overs)	v	Prime Doleshwar Sporting Club; 126/4 (17.4 overs)
Nurul Hasan 42 (24); Rejaur Rahman Raja 3/25 (4 overs)		Saif Hassan 60 (33); Mohammad Ashraful 2/7 (2 overs)

Prime Doleshwar Sporting Club won by 6 wickets
Sher-e-Bangla National Cricket Stadium, Dhaka
Umpires: Morshed Ali Khan and Mahfuzur Rahman
Player of the match: Saif Hassan (Prime Doleshwar Sporting Club)

- Prime Doleshwar Sporting Club won the toss and elected to field.

21 June 2021
14:00
Scorecard

Gazi Group Cricketers; 130 (19.1 overs)	v	Abahani Limited; 131/9 (19.5 overs)
Soumya Sarkar 30 (24); Mohammad Saifuddin 4/18 (4 overs)		Najmul Hossain Shanto 58 (49); Mukidul Islam 3/38 (4 overs)

Abahani Limited won by 1 wicket
Sher-e-Bangla National Cricket Stadium, Dhaka
Umpires: Tanvir Ahmed and Masudur Rahman
Player of the match: Mohammad Saifuddin (Abahani Limited)

- Abahani Limited won the toss and elected to field.

21 June 2021
18:30 (N)
Scorecard

Mohammedan Sporting Club; 154/7 (20 overs)	v	Prime Bank Cricket Club; 155/5 (19.1 overs)
Parvez Hossain Emon 45 (20); Mustafizur Rahman 2/22 (4 overs)		Rubel Mia 65 (40); Abu Jayed 1/24 (3.1 overs)

Prime Bank Cricket Club won by 5 wickets
Sher-e-Bangla National Cricket Stadium, Dhaka
Umpires: Sharfuddoula and Gazi Sohel
Player of the match: Rubel Mia (Prime Bank Cricket Club)

- Mohammedan Sporting Club won the toss and elected to bat.

23 June 2021
09:00
Scorecard

Mohammedan Sporting Club; 133/9 (20 overs)	v	Sheikh Jamal Dhanmondi Club; 137/3 (19 overs)
Shamsur Rahman 49 (40); Ebadot Hossain 3/17 (4 overs)		Mohammad Ashraful 38 (42); Shuvagata Hom 1/19 (3 overs)

Sheikh Jamal Dhanmondi Club won by 7 wickets
Sher-e-Bangla National Cricket Stadium, Dhaka
Umpires: Morshed Ali Khan and Masudur Rahman
Player of the match: Ebadot Hossain (Sheikh Jamal Dhanmondi Club)

- Sheikh Jamal Dhanmondi Club won the toss and elected to field.

23 June 2021
14:00
Scorecard

Gazi Group Cricketers; 125/9 (20 overs)	v	Prime Bank Cricket Club; 129/8 (19.5 overs)
Mahedi Hasan 33 (31); Alok Kapali 3/16 (4 overs)		Nahidul Islam 39 (25); Mahedi Hasan 2/12 (4 overs)

Prime Bank Cricket Club won by 2 wickets
Sher-e-Bangla National Cricket Stadium, Dhaka
Umpires: Tanvir Ahmed and Mahfuzur Rahman
Player of the match: Alok Kapali (Prime Bank Cricket Club)

- Prime Bank Cricket Club won the toss and elected to field.

23 June 2021
18:30 (N)
Scorecard

Prime Doleshwar Sporting Club; 135/6 (20 overs)	v	Abahani Limited; 94/3 (11.5 overs)
Fazle Mahmud 32 (41); Mohammad Saifuddin 3/27 (4 overs)		Munim Shahriar 44 (34); Kamrul Islam Rabbi 1/9 (2 overs)

Abahani Limited won by 7 wickets (DLS method)
Sher-e-Bangla National Cricket Stadium, Dhaka
Umpires: Sharfuddoula and Gazi Sohel
Player of the match: Mohammad Saifuddin (Abahani Limited)

- Prime Doleshwar Sporting Club won the toss and elected to bat.
- Abahani Limited were set a revised target of 91 runs from 13 overs due to rain.

24 June 2021
09:00
Scorecard

Mohammedan Sporting Club; 165/6 (20 overs)	v	Gazi Group Cricketers; 166/7 (19.3 overs)
Shuvagata Hom 59* (31); Mahedi Hasan 2/22 (4 overs)		Mahedi Hasan 92 (58); Asif Hasan 3/22 (4 overs)

Gazi Group Cricketers won by 3 wickets
Sher-e-Bangla National Cricket Stadium, Dhaka
Umpires: Morshed Ali Khan and Moniruzzaman
Player of the match: Mahedi Hasan (Gazi Group Cricketers)

- Gazi Group Cricketers won the toss and elected to field.

24 June 2021
14:00
Scorecard

Abahani Limited; 173/7 (20 overs)	v	Sheikh Jamal Dhanmondi Club; 175/4 (18.3 overs)
Liton Das 70 (51); Minhajul Abedin Afridi 2/25 (4 overs)		Mohammad Ashraful 72* (48); Aminul Islam 1/27 (3 overs)

Sheikh Jamal Dhanmondi Club won by 6 wickets
Sher-e-Bangla National Cricket Stadium, Dhaka
Umpires: Tanvir Ahmed and Gazi Sohel
Player of the match: Mohammad Ashraful (Sheikh Jamal Dhanmondi Club)

- Abahani Limited won the toss and elected to bat.

24 June 2021
18:30 (N)
Scorecard

Prime Bank Cricket Club; 126 (19.5 overs)	v	Prime Doleshwar Sporting Club; 130/5 (18.5 overs)
Rony Talukdar 59 (41); Shafiul Islam 4/36 (3.5 overs)		Shamim Hossain 52* (30); Rubel Hossain 2/22 (4 overs)

Prime Doleshwar Sporting Club won by 5 wickets
Sher-e-Bangla National Cricket Stadium, Dhaka
Umpires: Mahfuzur Rahman and Sharfuddoula
Player of the match: Shamim Hossain (Prime Doleshwar Sporting Club)

- Prime Bank Cricket Club won the toss and elected to bat.

26 June 2021
09:30
Scorecard

Mohammedan Sporting Club; 103/5 (13 overs)	v	Prime Doleshwar Sporting Club; 81 (11.4 overs)
Parvez Hossain Emon 26 (21); Enamul Haque 2/13 (2 overs)		Fazle Mahmud 16 (17); Ruyel Miah 5/21 (2.4 overs)

Mohammedan Sporting Club won by 25 runs (DLS method)
Sher-e-Bangla National Cricket Stadium, Dhaka
Umpires: Morshed Ali Khan and Mozahiduzzaman
Player of the match: Ruyel Miah (Mohammedan Sporting Club)

- Mohammedan Sporting Club won the toss and elected to bat.
- The match was reduced to 13 overs per side with a revised target due to rain.

26 June 2021
14:00
Scorecard

Abahani Limited; 150/7 (20 overs)	v	Prime Bank Cricket Club; 142/9 (20 overs)
Najmul Hossain Shanto 45 (40); Rubel Hossain 2/22 (4 overs)		Rubel Mia 41 (43); Mohammad Saifuddin 4/36 (4 overs)

Abahani Limited won by 8 runs
Sher-e-Bangla National Cricket Stadium, Dhaka
Umpires: Tanvir Ahmed and Sharfuddoula
Player of the match: Mohammad Saifuddin (Abahani Limited)

- Abahani Limited won the toss and elected to bat.

26 June 2021
18:30 (N)
Scorecard

Gazi Group Cricketers; 184/4 (20 overs)	v	Sheikh Jamal Dhanmondi Club; 149 (18 overs)
Mominul Haque 78* (53); Ziaur Rahman 2/40 (4 overs)		Imrul Kayes 45 (33); Mohiuddin Tareq 3/22 (2 overs)

Gazi Group Cricketers won by 35 runs
Sher-e-Bangla National Cricket Stadium, Dhaka
Umpires: Shafiuddin Ahmed and Mahfuzur Rahman
Player of the match: Mominul Haque (Gazi Group Cricketers)

- Sheikh Jamal Dhanmondi Club won the toss and elected to field.

=== Relegation League ===
19 June 2021
10:00
Scorecard

Legends of Rupganj	v	Partex Sporting Club

No result
Bangladesh Krira Shikkha Protisthan No 3 Ground, Savar
Umpires: Shyful Islam and Asadur Rahman

- Legends of Rupganj won the toss and elected to bat.
- No play was possible due to rain.

21 June 2021
10:00
Scorecard

Old DOHS Sports Club; 199/2 (20 overs)	v	Partex Sporting Club; 176/8 (20 overs)
Rakin Ahmed 92* (58); Jubair Hossain 1/32 (4 overs)		Hasanuzzaman 105 (52); Abdur Rashid 3/34 (4 overs)

Old DOHS Sports Club won by 23 runs
Bangladesh Krira Shikkha Protisthan No 3 Ground, Savar
Umpires: Shyful Islam and Habibur Rahman
Player of the match: Hasanuzzaman (Partex Sporting Club)

- Old DOHS Sports Club won the toss and elected to bat.

22 June 2021
13:30
Scorecard

Old DOHS Sports Club; 117/6 (18 overs)	v	Legends of Rupganj; 124/4 (17.1 overs)
Anisul Islam Emon 51 (39); Hossain Ali 3/23 (3 overs)		Mehedi Maruf 30 (22); Abdur Rashid 3/22 (4 overs)

Legends of Rupganj won by 6 wickets (DLS method)
Sher-e-Bangla National Cricket Stadium, Dhaka
Umpires: Masudur Rahman and Sharfuddoula
Player of the match: Naeem Islam (Legends of Rupganj)

- Legends of Rupganj won the toss and elected to field.
- The match was reduced to 18 overs per side due to rain. Legends of Rupganj were set a revised target of 122 runs.

23 June 2021
10:00
Scorecard

Legends of Rupganj; 200/3 (20 overs)	v	Partex Sporting Club; 173/8 (20 overs)
Mehedi Maruf 94 (63); Nihaduzzaman 1/26 (4 overs)		Isharul Islam 38* (22); Sohag Gazi 3/17 (4 overs)

Legends of Rupganj won by 27 runs
Bangladesh Krira Shikkha Protisthan No 3 Ground, Savar
Umpires: Shyful Islam and Asadur Rahman
Player of the match: Mehedi Maruf (Legends of Rupganj)

- Legends of Rupganj won the toss and elected to bat.
- Shamsul Islam (Legends of Rupganj) made his T20 debut.
