= Dhaka Premier Division Twenty20 Cricket League =

- Countries: Bangladesh
- Administrator: Cricket Committee of Dhaka Metropolis
- Format: Twenty20
- First edition: 2018–19
- Latest edition: 2021
- Tournament format: Round Robin
- Number of teams: 12
- Current trophy holder: Abahani Limited

The Dhaka Premier Division Twenty20 Cricket League is a Twenty20 cricket competition in Bangladesh. It began in the 2018–19 season and was next held in 2021; the 2019–20 competition was not held owing to the COVID-19 pandemic. As of 2025, it has only been held twice.

== Winners ==
- 2018–19: Sheikh Jamal Dhanmondi Club
- 2021: Abahani Limited

== 2018–19 ==
See main article: 2018–19 Dhaka Premier Division Twenty20 Cricket League

The 2018–19 competition was held in February and March 2019. It was contested by 12 teams, divided into four groups. In each group, each team played the other two teams once. The top team in each group then proceeded to the semi-finals, and the winners of the semi-finals met in the final, where Sheikh Jamal Dhanmondi Club defeated Prime Doleshwar Sporting Club.

== 2021 ==
See main article: 2021 Dhaka Premier Division Twenty20 Cricket League

The 2021 competition was held in May and June 2021. It was again contested by 12 teams, but this time they played a single round-robin of 11 matches each. The top six teams then competed in a Super League round-robin to determine the title, while the bottom three teams played a Relegation League round-robin to determine which two teams would be relegated from the league for the next competition.

Prime Bank Cricket Club led the table at the end of the initial round-robin, but Abahani Limited clinched the title when they defeated Prime Bank in the last round of the Super League.

== Records ==
The highest individual score in the league is 105 by Hasanuzzaman for Partex Sporting Club in 2020–21. The best bowling figures are 5 for 16 by Salauddin Sakil for Sheikh Jamal Dhanmondi in 2020–21.
