= Uzzaman =

Uzzaman is a surname. Notable people with the surname include:

- Badi Uzzaman (1939–2011), Pakistani-British actor
- Imran Uzzaman (born 1994), Bangladeshi cricketer
