= Rajibul Islam =

Bangladeshi cricketer (born 1994)

Personal information
- Born: 30 December 1994 (age 31)
- Source: ESPNcricinfo, 27 April 2017

Rajibul Islam (born 30 December 1994) is a Bangladeshi cricketer. He made his first-class debut for Khulna Division in the 2013–14 National Cricket League on 30 January 2014. He made his Twenty20 debut on 7 June 2021, for Partex Sporting Club in the 2021 Dhaka Premier Division Twenty20 Cricket League.
