= Mehrab Hossain (cricketer, born 1991) =

Bangladeshi cricketer (born 1991)

Personal information
- Born: 12 April 1991 (age 35)
- Source: Cricinfo, 11 October 2019

Mehrab Hossain (born 12 April 1991) is a Bangladeshi cricketer. He made his List A debut on 12 November 2014, for Kalabagan Cricket Academy in the 2014–15 Dhaka Premier Division. He made his Twenty20 debut on 7 June 2021, for Partex Sporting Club in the 2021 Dhaka Premier Division Twenty20 Cricket League.
