= Mohiuddin Tareq =

Bangladeshi cricketer (born 2003)

Personal information
- Full name: Mohiuddin Tareq
- Born: 14 November 2003 (age 22); Shayestaganj, Habiganj, Sylhet Division, Bangladesh
- Batting: Right-handed
- Bowling: Right-arm medium
- Source: Cricinfo, 27 June 2021

Mohiuddin Tareq (born 14 November 2003) is a Bangladeshi cricketer. He made his Twenty20 debut on 10 June 2021, for Gazi Group Cricketers in the 2021 Dhaka Premier Division Twenty20 Cricket League. He was named as the player of the match in the match against Mohammedan Sporting Club on 17 June 2021.

In December 2021, he was named as a standby player in Bangladesh's team for the 2022 ICC Under-19 Cricket World Cup in the West Indies. He made his first-class debut on 26 December 2021, for North Zone, in the 2021–22 Bangladesh Cricket League. He made his List A debut on 26 April 2022, for Rupganj Tigers Cricket Club in the 2021–22 Dhaka Premier Division Cricket League.
