= Shahriar Komol =

Bangladeshi cricketer (born 1995)

Personal information
- Born: 6 July 1995 (age 31)
- Source: Cricinfo, 1 April 2019

Shahriar Komol (born 6 July 1995) is a Bangladeshi cricketer. He made his List A debut for Khelaghar Samaj Kallyan Samity in the 2018–19 Dhaka Premier Division Cricket League on 1 April 2019. He made his Twenty20 debut on 11 June 2021, for Khelaghar Samaj Kallyan Samity in the 2021 Dhaka Premier Division Twenty20 Cricket League.
