= Mohammad Enamul =

Bangladeshi cricketer (born 1986)

Mohammad Enamul (Bengali: মোহাম্মদ এনামুল; born 3 May 1986) is a Bangladeshi cricketer. He made his First-class debut for Rangpur Division cricket team against Khulna Division cricket team in 2015, scoring 27 which includes 2 fours and as many sixes. He made his List-A debut on 15 September 2013. He took 2 wickets on that match, his maiden one being of batsman Fazle Mahmud. He was selected to play for Barisal Bulls mid tournament in 2016, playing an unbeaten knock 42 on debut in a losing cause; hitting 4 maximums.

He has been selected to play for Comilla Victorians in 2017.
