= Nurul Hasan (cricketer) =

Bangladeshi cricketer (born 1993)

Personal information
- Full name: Quazi Nurul Hasan
- Born: 21 November 1993 (age 32); Khulna, Bangladesh
- Nickname: Sohan
- Height: 1.75 m (5 ft 9 in)
- Batting: Right-handed
- Bowling: Right-arm off break
- Role: Wicket-keeper

International information
- National side: Bangladesh (2016-present)
- Test debut (cap 85): 20 January 2017 v New Zealand
- Last Test: 6 December 2023 v New Zealand
- ODI debut (cap 120): 29 December 2016 v New Zealand
- Last ODI: 23 October 2025 v West Indies
- ODI shirt no.: 81
- T20I debut (cap 49): 15 January 2016 v Zimbabwe
- Last T20I: 5 October 2025 v Afghanistan
- T20I shirt no.: 18 (previously 81)

Domestic team information
- Years: Team
- 2013: Chittagong Kings
- 2015–16: Sylhet Super Stars
- 2016/17–: Sheikh Jamal Dhanmondi Club
- 2009–present: Khulna Division
- 2016-18: Prime Bank
- 2019-20: Chattogram Challengers
- 2021: Minister Group Rajshahi
- 2022: Fortune Barishal
- 2023– Present: Rangpur Riders

Career statistics
Competition	Test	ODI	T20I	FC
Matches	11	16	57	111
Runs scored	440	306	579	5,505
Batting average	22.00	34.00	17.54	36.94
100s/50s	0/3	0/0	0/0	12/23
Top score	64	45*	42*	182*
Balls bowled	0	–	–	36
Wickets	–	–	–	1
Bowling average	–	–	–	36.00
5 wickets in innings	–	–	–	0
10 wickets in match	–	–	–	0
Best bowling	–	–	–	1/3
Catches/stumpings	25/9	18/5	24/9	283/54
- Source: ESPNcricinfo, 16 July 2026

Quazi Nurul Hasan (Bengali: কাজী নুরুল হাসান; born 21 November 1993) is a Bangladeshi cricketer who represents Bangladesh internationally in all formats. Sohan is well known in Bangladesh for his keeping skills and great flexibility. Sohan is a wicket-keeper who bats right-handed lower down the order as a hard-hitting finisher. He was born in Khulna. In July 2022, he was named as the captain of the Twenty20 International (T20I) team for Bangladesh's tour of Zimbabwe.

== Domestic career ==
In the 2013-14 National Cricket League, Nurul, playing for Dhaka Division as a wicket keeper, bowled 1 over in the 4th innings against Sylhet Division, got the wicket of Sayeem Alam, his only wicket in professional career till now.Dhaka Division v Sylhet Division

Nurul has played for Sylhet Super Stars in the Bangladesh Premier League in 2015.

In October 2015, Nurul posted his highest knock of unbeaten 182 against Dhaka Division in 2015-16 National Cricket League which helped Khulna to fight back in the match after being all out for just 117 in the first innings.

He was the leading run-scorer for Sheikh Jamal Dhanmondi Club in the 2017–18 Dhaka Premier Division Cricket League, with 546 runs in 12 matches.

In October 2018, he was named in the squad for the Dhaka Dynamites team, following the draft for the 2018–19 Bangladesh Premier League. He captained Sheikh Jamal Dhanmondi Club in List A and Twenty20 cricket in 2017-18 and 2018–19; they won the inaugural tournament of the Dhaka Premier Division Twenty20 Cricket League in 2018–19.

He was the leading run-scorer for Sheikh Jamal Dhanmondi Club in the 2018–19 Dhaka Premier Division Cricket League tournament, with 524 runs in 16 matches. In November 2019, he was selected to play for the Chattogram Challengers in the 2019–20 Bangladesh Premier League.

== International career ==
Nurul made his Twenty20 International debut for Bangladesh against Zimbabwe on 15 January 2016.

He was added to Bangladesh's One Day International (ODI) in December 2016 as a replacement for the injured Mushfiqur Rahim, for their series against New Zealand. He made his ODI debut for Bangladesh on 29 December 2016 against New Zealand. He made his Test debut in the second Test against New Zealand on 20 January 2017.

In December 2018, he was named as the captain of Bangladesh's team for the 2018 ACC Emerging Teams Asia Cup. In April 2021, he was named in the Bangladesh's preliminary squad for 2-match test series against Sri Lanka.

In June 2021, he was selected to play for Bangladesh across all formats for their tour to Zimbabwe, since he had last played an international match in 2018. He was originally replaced by Mushfiqur Rahim for the T20I series, after he had been one of the leading performers in the 2021 Dhaka Premier Division Twenty20 Cricket League.

In September 2021, he was named in Bangladesh's squad for the 2021 ICC Men's T20 World Cup.

On 22 August 2025, he was named in the Bangladesh Squad for Asia Cup 2025 & T20I Series Against the Netherlands.
