= Imran Uzzaman =

Bangladeshi cricketer (born 1994)

Personal information
- Born: 4 November 1994 (age 32); Jessore, Bangladesh
- Height: 6 ft 1 in (185 cm)
- Batting: Right-handed
- Bowling: Off break
- Role: Wicket-keeper batsman

Domestic team information
- Years: Team
- 2012-Present: Jashore
- 2019: Prime Doleshwar Sporting Club (squad no. 84)
- 2018: Kala Bagan Krira Chakra (squad no. 48)
- 2022: Minister Dhaka

Career statistics
Competition	FC	LA	T20
Matches	15	45	36
Runs scored	566	1,262	547
Batting average	22.64	28.68	17.64
100s/50s	0/4	1/6	0/2
Top score	92	123	65
Catches/stumpings	34/1	31/11	24/6
- Source: ESPNcricinfo, 18 July 2025

Imran Uzzaman (born 4 November 1994) is a Bangladeshi cricketer who plays as a wicket-keeper batsman. He made his List A debut for Prime Doleshwar Sporting Club in the 2018–19 Dhaka Premier Division Cricket League on 27 March 2019. He made his first-class debut for Khulna Division in the 2019–20 National Cricket League on 10 October 2019. He made his Twenty20 debut on 31 May 2021, for Prime Doleshwar Sporting Club in the 2021 Dhaka Premier Division Twenty20 Cricket League.
