= Imran Parvez =

Bangladeshi cricketer (born 1977)

Personal information
- Born: 28 December 1977 (age 48); Rajshahi, Bangladesh
- Nickname: Ripon
- Batting: Right-handed
- Bowling: Right arm offbreak

Domestic team information
- Years: Team
- 2000/01–2003/04: Rajshahi Division
- First-class debut: 22 November 2000 Rajshahi Division v Dhaka Division
- Last First-class: 23 February 2004 Rajshahi Division v Khulna Division
- List A debut: 25 November 2000 Rajshahi Division v Dhaka Division
- Last List A: 3 March 2004 Rajshahi Division v Sylhet Division

Career statistics
Competition	FC	LA
Matches	27	7
Runs scored	378	–
Batting average	10.50	–
100s/50s	–/–	–/–
Top score	37*	–
Balls bowled	4753	204
Wickets	76	6
Bowling average	27.36	20.16
5 wickets in innings	2	–
10 wickets in match	–	–
Best bowling	5/35	3/30
Catches/stumpings	20/–	2/–
- Source: CricketArchive, 15 November 2016

Imran Parvez (born 28 December 1977, in Rajshahi) is a Bangladeshi former first-class cricketer active 2000–2004, who is also known by his nickname 'Ripon'. After retiring from cricket he became an umpire and officiates matches domestic cricket.

== Career ==
=== Playing career ===
He made his debut for Rajshahi Division in 2000/01, playing for them until 2003/04. He took 76 first-class wickets with his off breaks, with a best of 5 for 35 against Barisal Division. His other five wicket haul, 5 for 82, came against Chittagong Division. A tail end right-handed batsman, his best score of 37* came against Barisal Division.

=== Umpiring career ===
He is now an umpire and stood in matches in Bangladesh's National Cricket League.

== Controversies ==
In a group match between Abahani Limited and Mohammedan Sporting Club in the 2021 Dhaka Premier Division Twenty20 Cricket League, Abahani cricketer Shakib Al Hasan, firstly, kicked the stumps and argued with him for a wrongful decision and later Shakib again ran from his mid-off position to uproot all the stumps at the non-striker's end when both the match officials called for a rain break and Shakib again got involved in a heated argument with them.Shakib claimed there's biased umpiring in DPL.
