= Rakin Ahmed =

Bangladeshi cricketer (born 1993)

Personal information
- Full name: Rakin Ahmed
- Born: 31 May 1993 (age 33); Dhaka, Bangladesh
- Batting: Right-handed
- Source: Cricinfo, 13 August 2021

Rakin Ahmed (born 31 May 1993) is a Bangladeshi cricketer who plays as a right-handed batsman. He made his List A debut for Partex Sporting Club in the 2016–17 Dhaka Premier Division Cricket League on 11 May 2017. He made his first-class debut for Rangpur Division in the 2018–19 National Cricket League on 22 October 2018. He made his Twenty20 debut on 31 May 2021, for Old DOHS Sports Club in the 2021 Dhaka Premier Division Twenty20 Cricket League.
