= Hasanuzzaman =

Bangladeshi cricketer (born 1991)

Md Hasanuzzaman
Personal information
- Full name: Md Hasanuzzaman
- Born: 1 June 1991 (age 35); Jessore, Bangladesh
- Height: 5 ft 7 in (1.70 m)
- Batting: Right-handed
- Bowling: Right-arm off break
- Role: Batsman

Domestic team information
- Years: Team
- 2013-present: Jashore
- 2016–present: Khulna Division
- 2016–17: Khulna Titans
- 2014: Victoria Sporting Club
- 2016: Kala Bagan Krira Chakra
- 2017: Legends of Rupganj
- 2018–2019: Sheikh Jamal Dhanmondi Club
- 2021: Partex Sporting Club
- 2022: Khelaghar Samaj Kallyan Samity
- 2023: Prime Bank Cricket Club
- Source: ESPNcricinfo, 4 September 2019

Md Hasanuzzaman (born 1 June 1991) is a Bangladeshi cricketer. He made his Twenty20 (T20) debut on 12 November 2016 for Khulna Titans in the 2016–17 Bangladesh Premier League. He made his first-class debut for Khulna Division in the 2016–17 National Cricket League on 3 January 2017.

A right-handed opening batsman and part-time off spin bowler, Hasanuzzaman has played Bangladeshi domestic cricket for Khulna Titans and the Khulna Division.
