= Salauddin Sakil =

Bangladeshi cricketer (born 1989)

Personal information
- Born: 7 July 1989 (age 37); Munshiganj, Bangladesh
- Batting: Left-handed
- Bowling: Left-arm medium
- Role: Bowler

Career statistics
Competition	FC	LA	T20
Matches	41	42	26
Runs scored	171	156	8
Batting average	6.57	13.00	–
100s/50s	0/0	0/0	0/0
Top score	16	31	8*
Balls bowled	5,315	1,731	500
Wickets	120	51	31
Bowling average	22.93	31.82	23.64
5 wickets in innings	2	0	1
10 wickets in match	0	0	0
Best bowling	6/31	4/21	5/16
Catches/stumpings	5/–	9/–	9/–
- Source: Cricinfo, 20 July 2025

Salauddin Sakil (born 7 July 1989) is a Bangladeshi cricketer. He made his List A debut for Prime Doleshwar Sporting Club in the 2017–18 Dhaka Premier Division Cricket League on 5 February 2018. He made his first-class debut for Central Zone in the 2017–18 Bangladesh Cricket League on 17 April 2018. He made his Twenty20 debut for Sheikh Jamal Dhanmondi Club in the 2018–19 Dhaka Premier Division Twenty20 Cricket League on 25 February 2019.

He was the leading wicket-taker for Sheikh Jamal Dhanmondi Club in the 2018–19 Dhaka Premier Division Cricket League tournament, with 18 dismissals in 13 matches. In June 2021, in the sixth round of the 2021 Dhaka Premier Division Twenty20 Cricket League, Sakil took a five-wicket haul, with 5/16.
