= Moniruzzaman (cricketer) =

Bangladeshi cricketer (born 1976)

Personal information
- Full name: AI Mohammad Moniruzzaman
- Born: 25 October 1976 (age 50); Mymensingh, Bangladesh
- Nickname: Tinku
- Batting: Right-handed

International information
- National side: Bangladesh
- ODI debut (cap 71): 10 November 2003 v England
- Last ODI: 12 November 2003 v England

Umpiring information
- WODIs umpired: 1 (2023)
- WT20Is umpired: 2 (2023)
- FC umpired: 30
- LA umpired: 38
- T20 umpired: 13

Career statistics
Competition	ODI	FC	LA
Matches	2	27	18
Runs scored	1	1,238	339
Batting average	0.50	25.26	18.83
100s/50s	0/0	2/4	0/3
Top score	1	151	70
Balls bowled	–	210	9
Wickets	–	3	0
Bowling average	–	24.00	–
5 wickets in innings	–	0	–
10 wickets in match	–	0	–
Best bowling	–	2/33	–
Catches/stumpings	0/–	17/2	4/0
- Source: ESPNCricinfo, 28 November 2023

Al Mohammad Moniruzzaman (Bengali: আল মোহাম্মদ মনিরুজ্জামান; born 25 October 1976) is a Bangladeshi cricketer who has played in two One Day Internationals in 2003. He is now an umpire and stood in matches in the 2016–17 National Cricket League in Bangladesh. He also standing as an on-field umpire in BPL matches since 2015 Bangladesh Premier League.

== Umpiring career ==
=== Controversy ===
He was included in Bangladesh's ICC Emerging Panel and was considered to be on his way to making the elite program. But, he left the profession of umpiring due to the concern of senior national players like Shakib Al Hasan and Mahmudullah showing dissent aggressively to umpire's decisions during 2021 Dhaka Premier Division Twenty20 Cricket League. He had officiated 13 matches in the tournament. While expressing his concern, he said, "I am concerned about the behaviour of the senior cricketers in this 2021 DPL. I think other players could also be influenced by seeing their behaviour. This situation could turn worse in future." "Enough is enough for me and I don't want to do umpiring anymore,....I have some self-respect and want to live with it.", he told to Cricbuzz.
