= Fazle Mahmud =

Bangladeshi cricketer (born 1995)

Personal information
- Full name: Fazle Mahmud Rabbi
- Born: 30 December 1987 (age 38); Barisal, Bangladesh
- Nickname: Rabbi
- Batting: Left-handed
- Bowling: Slow left-arm orthodox
- Role: Batting All-rounder

International information
- National side: Bangladesh
- ODI debut (cap 129): 21 October 2018 v Zimbabwe
- Last ODI: 24 October 2018 v Zimbabwe

Domestic team information
- Years: Team
- 2004-present: Barisal Division
- 2016: Barisal Bulls
- 2017,2019-20,2024: Rangpur Riders
- 2019: Rajshahi Kings
- 2023: Fortune Barishal

Career statistics
Competition	FC	LA	T20
Matches	128	172	65
Runs scored	6,910	5,505	1,265
Batting average	32.44	37.96	24.80
100s/50s	10/41	12/31	0/6
Top score	195	149*	77
Balls bowled	2887	1545	36
Wickets	35	33	0
Bowling average	44.82	41.30	-
5 wickets in innings	0	0	0
10 wickets in match	0	0	0
Best bowling	4/80	3/18	-
Catches/stumpings	61/-	44/-	16/-
- Source: ESPNcricinfo, 4 June 2026

Fazle Mahmud Rabbi (born 13 December 1995) is a first-class and List A cricketer from Bangladesh who is sometimes referred to on scoresheets by his nickname 'Rabbi'. He made his first-class debut for Barisal Division in 2003–04 against Dhaka Division.

He was the leading run-scorer for Prime Doleshwar Sporting Club in the 2017–18 Dhaka Premier Division Cricket League, with 708 runs in 16 matches.

In August 2018, he was one of twelve debutants to be selected for a 31-man preliminary squad for Bangladesh ahead of the 2018 Asia Cup. In October 2018, he was named in Bangladesh's One Day International (ODI) squad for their series against Zimbabwe. He made his ODI debut for Bangladesh against Zimbabwe on 21 October 2018.

In October 2018, he was named in the squad for the Rajshahi Kings team, following the draft for the 2018–19 Bangladesh Premier League. He was the leading run-scorer for Brothers Union in the 2018–19 Dhaka Premier Division Cricket League tournament, with 603 runs in 13 matches. In November 2019, he was selected to play for the Rangpur Rangers in the 2019–20 Bangladesh Premier League.

In December 2021, he was named as the replacement for Shakib Al Hasan to Bangladesh's Test squad for their series against New Zealand.
