= Prime Doleshwar Sporting Club =

Prime Doleshwar Sporting Club is a Bangladeshi cricket team that has played List A cricket in the Dhaka Premier League and Twenty20 cricket in the Dhaka Premier Division Twenty20 Cricket League.

== List A record ==
- 2013-14: 15 matches, won 10, finished third
- 2014-15: 16 matches, won 12, finished fourth
- 2015-16: 16 matches, won 10, finished second
- 2016-17: 16 matches, won 12, finished second
- 2017-18: 16 matches, won 8, finished fourth
- 2018-19: 16 matches, won 10, finished third

Farhad Reza was captain in 2013–14, and again from 2015–16 to 2018–19. Elias Sunny captained the side in 2014–15.

Prime Doleshwar were scheduled to take part in the 2021-22 tournament but withdrew shortly before it began, leaving 11 teams to compete. They were relegated to the Dhaka First Division Cricket League for the 2022–23 season.

== Twenty20 record ==
Prime Doleshwar were runners-up in the inaugural tournament of the Dhaka Premier Division Twenty20 Cricket League in 2018–19 when they lost to Sheikh Jamal Dhanmondi in the final by 24 runs. Farhad Reza, Prime Doleshwar's captain, was named player of the tournament.

== Records ==
Prime Doleshwar's highest List A individual score is 148 not out by Saif Hassan in 2018–19, and the best bowling figures are 6 for 19 by Taijul Islam in 2013–14.
