= 2020–21 Bangabandhu T20 Cup =

Cricket tournament

- Logo of Bangabandhu T20 Cup
- Dates: 24 November – 18 December 2020
- Administrator: Bangladesh Cricket Board
- Cricket format: Twenty20
- Tournament format: Round-robin
- Champions: Gemcon Khulna
- Participants: 5
- Matches: 24
- Player of the series: Mustafizur Rahman
- Most runs: Litton Das (393)
- Most wickets: Mustafizur Rahman (22)

The 2020–21 Bangabandhu T20 Cup (Bengali: বঙ্গবন্ধু টি-২০ কাপ) was a Twenty20 cricket competition that was held in Bangladesh. It was played by five teams, during November and December 2020. In November 2020, more than 100 players began to undertake fitness tests, ahead of a players' draft for the tournament. The players' draft took place on 12 November 2020, with the tournament starting in the third week of November. Two days later, the Bangladesh Cricket Board (BCB) confirmed the full schedule for the tournament.

The BCB originally announced that the tournament would be used for the criteria to select players for the Twenty20 International (T20I) matches against the West Indies, scheduled to be played in early 2021. However, in December 2020, the two cricket boards agreed the itinerary for the tour, with the T20I matches being dropped.

Gemcon Khulna won the tournament, beating Gazi Group Chattogram by five runs in the final.

== Teams ==
The BCB confirmed that the following teams would take part:

- Beximco Dhaka
- Fortune Barishal
- Gazi Group Chattogram
- Gemcon Khulna
- Minister Group Rajshahi

== Squads ==
The players' draft took place on 12 November 2020, with each team selecting a squad of sixteen players.

Beximco Dhaka	Fortune Barishal	Gazi Group Chattogram	Gemcon Khulna	Minister Group Rajshahi
Mushfiqur Rahim (c); Rubel Hossain; Tanzid Hasan; Nasum Ahmed; Mohammad Naim; Nayeem Hasan; Shahadat Hossain; Akbar Ali; Yasir Ali; Sabbir Rahman; Mehedi Hasan Rana; Muktar Ali; Shafiqul Islam; Abu Hider; Pinak Ghosh; Robiul Islam Robi; Al-Amin; Mohammad Arafat	Tamim Iqbal (c); Afif Hossain; Taskin Ahmed; Irfan Sukkur; Mehedi Hasan; Abu Jayed; Towhid Hridoy; Tanvir Islam; Sumon Khan; Saif Hassan; Aminul Islam; Mahidul Islam Ankon; Parvez Hossain Emon; Kamrul Islam Rabbi; Abu Sayeem; Suhrawadi Shuvo; Salauddin Sakil	Mohammad Mithun (c); Mustafizur Rahman; Litton Das; Soumya Sarkar; Mosaddek Hossain; Shoriful Islam; Ziaur Rahman; Taijul Islam; Shamsur Rahman; Nahidul Islam; Shykat Ali; Mominul Haque; Rakibul Hasan; Sanjit Saha; Mahmudul Hasan Joy; Mehedi Hasan; Ruyel Miah; Nadif Chowdhury	Mahmudullah (c); Shakib Al Hasan; Imrul Kayes; Hasan Mahmud; Al-Amin Hossain; Anamul Haque; Shamim Hossain; Ariful Haque; Shafiul Islam; Shuvagata Hom; Shohidul Islam; Rishad Hossain; Zakir Hasan; Nazmul Islam; Salman Hossain; Jahurul Islam; Mashrafe Mortaza; Khaled Ahmed	Najmul Hossain Shanto (c); Mohammad Saifuddin; Mahedi Hasan; Nurul Hasan; Farhad Reza; Mohammad Ashraful; Arafat Sunny; Ebadot Hossain; Fazle Mahmud; Rony Talukdar; Anisul Islam Emon; Rejaur Rahman Raja; Jaker Ali; Raqibul Hasan; Mukidul Islam; Sunzamul Islam

== Points table ==
Team	Pld	W	L	NR	Pts	NRR
Gazi Group Chattogram	8	7	1	0	14	+1.157
Gemcon Khulna	8	4	4	0	8	+0.014
Beximco Dhaka	8	4	4	0	8	–0.322
Fortune Barishal	8	3	5	0	6	–0.367
Minister Group Rajshahi	8	2	6	0	4	–0.459

- advanced to the Qualifier 1
- advanced to the Eliminator

== League stage ==
24 November 2020
13:30
Scorecard

Minister Group Rajshahi; 169/9 (20 overs)	v	Beximco Dhaka; 167/5 (20 overs)
Mahedi Hasan 50 (32); Muktar Ali 3/22 (4 overs)		Mushfiqur Rahim 41 (34); Mahedi Hasan 1/22 (4 overs)

Minister Group Rajshahi won by 2 runs
Sher-e-Bangla National Cricket Stadium, Mirpur
Umpires: Mahfuzur Rahman and Masudur Rahman
Player of the match: Mahedi Hasan (Minister Group Rajshahi)

- Beximco Dhaka won the toss and elected to field.

24 November 2020
18:30 (D/N)
Scorecard

Fortune Barishal; 152/9 (20 overs)	v	Gemcon Khulna; 155/6 (19.5 overs)
Parvez Hossain Emon 51 (42); Shohidul Islam 4/17 (4 overs)		Ariful Haque 48* (34); Sumon Khan 2/21 (4 overs)

Gemcon Khulna won by 4 wickets
Sher-e-Bangla National Cricket Stadium, Mirpur
Umpires: Sharfuddoula and Gazi Sohel
Player of the match: Ariful Haque (Gemcon Khulna)

- Gemcon Khulna won the toss and elected to field.

26 November 2020
13:30
Scorecard

Gemcon Khulna; 146/6 (20 overs)	v	Minister Group Rajshahi; 147/4 (17.2 overs)
Ariful Haque 41* (31); Mukidul Islam 2/44 (4 overs)		Najmul Hossain Shanto 55 (34); Rishad Hossain 2/34 (3 overs)

Minister Group Rajshahi won by 6 wickets
Sher-e-Bangla National Cricket Stadium, Mirpur
Umpires: Morshed Ali Khan and Masudur Rahman
Player of the match: Najmul Hossain Shanto (Minister Group Rajshahi)

- Gemcon Khulna won the toss and elected to bat.

26 November 2020
18:30 (D/N)
Scorecard

Beximco Dhaka; 88 (16.2 overs)	v	Gazi Group Chattogram; 90/1 (10.5 overs)
Mohammad Naim 40 (23); Mosaddek Hossain 2/9 (2 overs)		Soumya Sarkar 44* (29); Nasum Ahmed 1/5 (1 over)

Gazi Group Chattogram won by 9 wickets
Sher-e-Bangla National Cricket Stadium, Mirpur
Umpires: Tanvir Ahmed and Mahfuzur Rahman
Player of the match: Mosaddek Hossain (Gazi Group Chattogram)

- Gazi Group Chattogram won the toss and elected to field.
- Shahadat Hossain (Beximco Dhaka) made his T20 debut.

28 November 2020
13:30
Scorecard

Gemcon Khulna; 86 (17.5 overs)	v	Gazi Group Chattogram; 87/1 (13.4 overs)
Imrul Kayes 21 (26); Mustafizur Rahman 4/5 (3.5 overs)		Litton Das 53* (46); Mahmudullah 1/16 (3 overs)

Gazi Group Chattogram won by 9 wickets
Sher-e-Bangla National Cricket Stadium, Mirpur
Umpires: Mahfuzur Rahman and Gazi Sohel
Player of the match: Mustafizur Rahman (Gazi Group Chattogram)

- Gazi Group Chattogram won the toss and elected to field.

28 November 2020
18:30 (D/N)
Scorecard

Minister Group Rajshahi; 132/9 (20 overs)	v	Fortune Barishal; 136/5 (19 overs)
Mahedi Hasan 34 (23); Kamrul Islam Rabbi 4/21 (4 overs)		Tamim Iqbal 77* (61); Mukidul Islam 2/27 (4 overs)

Fortune Barishal won by 5 wickets
Sher-e-Bangla National Cricket Stadium, Mirpur
Umpires: Tanvir Ahmed and Sharfuddoula
Player of the match: Tamim Iqbal (Fortune Barishal)

- Fortune Barishal won the toss and elected to field.
- Rejaur Rahman Raja (Minister Group Rajshahi) made his T20 debut.

30 November 2020
13:30
Scorecard

Gazi Group Chattogram; 151/7 (20 overs)	v	Fortune Barishal; 141/8 (20 overs)
Litton Das 35 (25); Abu Jayed 2/42 (4 overs)		Tamim Iqbal 32 (32); Mustafizur Rahman 3/23 (4 overs)

Gazi Group Chattogram won by 10 runs
Sher-e-Bangla National Cricket Stadium, Mirpur
Umpires: Mahfuzur Rahman and Sharfuddoula
Player of the match: Shoriful Islam (Gazi Group Chattogram)

- Fortune Barishal won the toss and elected to field.

30 November 2020
18:30 (D/N)
Scorecard

Gemcon Khulna; 146/7 (20 overs)	v	Beximco Dhaka; 109 (19.2 overs)
Mahmudullah 45 (47); Rubel Hossain 3/28 (4 overs)		Mushfiqur Rahim 37 (35); Shuvagata Hom 3/13 (3.2 overs)

Gemcon Khulna won by 37 runs
Sher-e-Bangla National Cricket Stadium, Mirpur
Umpires: Masudur Rahman and Gazi Sohel
Player of the match: Shuvagata Hom (Gemcon Khulna)

- Beximco Dhaka won the toss and elected to field.
- Shafiqul Islam (Beximco Dhaka) made his T20 debut.

2 December 2020
13:30
Scorecard

Fortune Barishal; 108/8 (20 overs)	v	Beximco Dhaka; 109/3 (18.5 overs)
Towhid Hridoy 33 (33); Robiul Islam Robi 4/20 (4 overs)		Yasir Ali 44* (30); Mehedi Hasan 1/13 (4 overs)

Beximco Dhaka won by 7 wickets
Sher-e-Bangla National Cricket Stadium, Mirpur
Umpires: Mahfuzur Rahman and Gazi Sohel
Player of the match: Robiul Islam Robi (Beximco Dhaka)

- Beximco Dhaka won the toss and elected to field.

2 December 2020
18:30 (D/N)
Scorecard

Gazi Group Chattogram; 176/5 (20 overs)	v	Minister Group Rajshahi; 175/7 (20 overs)
Litton Das 78* (53); Mukidul Islam 3/30 (4 overs)		Anisul Islam Emon 58 (44); Mustafizur Rahman 3/37 (4 overs)

Gazi Group Chattogram won by 1 run
Sher-e-Bangla National Cricket Stadium, Mirpur
Umpires: Tanvir Ahmed and Morshed Ali Khan
Player of the match: Litton Das (Gazi Group Chattogram)

- Minister Group Rajshahi won the toss and elected to field.

4 December 2020
12:00
Scorecard

Gemcon Khulna; 173/6 (20 overs)	v	Fortune Barishal; 125 (19.5 overs)
Zakir Hasan 63 (42); Kamrul Islam Rabbi 3/33 (4 overs)		Towhid Hridoy 33 (27); Shohidul Islam 2/17 (2.5 overs)

Gemcon Khulna won by 48 runs
Sher-e-Bangla National Cricket Stadium, Mirpur
Umpires: Tanvir Ahmed and Mahfuzur Rahman
Player of the match: Zakir Hasan (Gemcon Khulna)

- Fortune Barishal won the toss and elected to field.

4 December 2020
17:00 (D/N)
Scorecard

Beximco Dhaka; 175/5 (20 overs)	v	Minister Group Rajshahi; 150 (19.1 overs)
Yasir Ali 67 (39); Mukidul Islam 2/38 (3 overs)		Fazle Mahmud 58 (40); Muktar Ali 4/37 (4 overs)

Beximco Dhaka won by 25 runs
Sher-e-Bangla National Cricket Stadium, Mirpur
Umpires: Masudur Rahman and Sharfuddoula
Player of the match: Yasir Ali (Beximco Dhaka)

- Minister Group Rajshahi won the toss and elected to field.

6 December 2020
13:30
Scorecard

Beximco Dhaka; 145/4 (20 overs)	v	Gazi Group Chattogram; 138/9 (20 overs)
Mushfiqur Rahim 73* (50); Nahidul Islam 1/16 (4 overs)		Litton Das 47 (39); Muktar Ali 3/39 (4 overs)

Beximco Dhaka won by 7 runs
Sher-e-Bangla National Cricket Stadium, Mirpur
Umpires: Mahfuzur Rahman and Masudur Rahman
Player of the match: Mushfiqur Rahim (Beximco Dhaka)

- Gazi Group Chattogram won the toss and elected to field.
- Rakibul Hasan and Mahmudul Hasan Joy (Gazi Group Chattogram) both made their T20 debuts.

6 December 2020
18:30 (D/N)
Scorecard

Minister Group Rajshahi; 145/5 (20 overs)	v	Gemcon Khulna; 146/5 (19.2 overs)
Najmul Hossain Shanto 55 (38); Shuvagata Hom 2/25 (3 overs)		Jahurul Islam 43 (40); Mukidul Islam 2/31 (3.2 overs)

Gemcon Khulna won by 5 wickets
Sher-e-Bangla National Cricket Stadium, Mirpur
Umpires: Sharfuddoula and Gazi Sohel
Player of the match: Mahmudullah (Gemcon Khulna)

- Gemcon Khulna won the toss and elected to field.

8 December 2020
13:30
Scorecard

Minister Group Rajshahi; 220/7 (20 overs)	v	Fortune Barishal; 221/2 (18.1 overs)
Najmul Hossain Shanto 109 (55); Kamrul Islam Rabbi 4/49 (4 overs)		Parvez Hossain Emon 100* (42); Mohammad Saifuddin 1/40 (4 overs)

Fortune Barishal won by 8 wickets
Sher-e-Bangla National Cricket Stadium, Mirpur
Umpires: Tanvir Ahmed and Mahfuzur Rahman
Player of the match: Parvez Hossain Emon (Fortune Barishal)

- Fortune Barishal won the toss and elected to field.
- Kamrul Islam Rabbi (Fortune Barishal) took a hat-trick.
- Parvez Hossain Emon (Fortune Barishal) scored the fastest T20 century by a Bangladeshi batsman.

8 December 2020
18:30 (D/N)
Scorecard

Gemcon Khulna; 157/9 (20 overs)	v	Gazi Group Chattogram; 162/7 (20 overs)
Shuvagata Hom 32* (14); Shoriful Islam 3/34 (4 overs)		Shamsur Rahman 45* (30); Shakib Al Hasan 2/30 (4 overs)

Gazi Group Chattogram won by 3 wickets
Sher-e-Bangla National Cricket Stadium, Mirpur
Umpires: Moniruzzaman and Masudur Rahman
Player of the match: Shamsur Rahman (Gazi Group Chattogram)

- Gazi Group Chattogram won the toss and elected to field.

10 December 2020
12:30
Scorecard

Beximco Dhaka; 179/7 (20 overs)	v	Gemcon Khulna; 159 (19.3 overs)
Sabbir Rahman 56 (38); Shohidul Islam 2/31 (4 overs)		Jahurul Islam 53 (36); Robiul Islam Robi 5/27 (3.3 overs)

Beximco Dhaka won by 20 runs
Sher-e-Bangla National Cricket Stadium, Mirpur
Umpires: Tanvir Ahmed and Masudur Rahman
Player of the match: Robiul Islam Robi (Beximco Dhaka)

- Gencon Khulna won the toss and elected to field.

10 December 2020
17:30 (D/N)
Scorecard

Fortune Barishal; 149/6 (20 overs)	v	Gazi Group Chattogram; 153/3 (18.4 overs)
Saif Hassan 46 (33); Mosaddek Hossain 2/16 (4 overs)		Soumya Sarkar 62 (37); Sumon Khan 2/30 (4 overs)

Gazi Group Chattogram won by 7 wickets
Sher-e-Bangla National Cricket Stadium, Mirpur
Umpires: Mahfuzur Rahman and Sharfuddoula
Player of the match: Soumya Sarkar (Gazi Group Chattogram)

- Gazi Group Chattogram won the toss and elected to field.

12 December 2020
12:30
Scorecard

Gazi Group Chattogram; 175/4 (20 overs)	v	Minister Group Rajshahi; 139/8 (20 overs)
Soumya Sarkar 63 (48); Anisul Islam Emon 2/21 (3.3 overs)		Nurul Hasan 28 (28); Nahidul Islam 3/19 (4 overs)

Gazi Group Chattogram won by 36 runs
Sher-e-Bangla National Cricket Stadium, Mirpur
Umpires: Moniruzzaman and Sharfuddoula
Player of the match: Nahidul Islam (Gazi Group Chattogram)

- Minister Group Rajshahi won the toss and elected to field.

12 December 2020
17:30 (D/N)
Scorecard

Fortune Barishal; 193/3 (20 overs)	v	Beximco Dhaka; 191/6 (20 overs)
Towhid Hridoy 51* (22); Al-Amin 1/5 (1 over)		Mohammad Naim 105 (64); Suhrawadi Shuvo 3/13 (3 overs)

Fortune Barishal won by 2 runs
Sher-e-Bangla National Cricket Stadium, Mirpur
Umpires: Mahfuzur Rahman and Gazi Sohel
Player of the match: Mohammad Naim (Beximco Dhaka)

- Beximco Dhaka won the toss and elected to field.

== Playoffs ==
Eliminator
14 December 2020
12:30
Scorecard

Beximco Dhaka; 150/8 (20 overs)	v	Fortune Barishal; 141/9 (20 overs)
Yasir Ali 54 (43); Mehedi Hasan 2/23 (4 overs)		Afif Hossain 55 (35); Muktar Ali 3/18 (2 overs)

Beximco Dhaka won by 9 runs
Sher-e-Bangla National Cricket Stadium, Mirpur
Umpires: Mahfuzur Rahman and Gazi Sohel
Player of the match: Yasir Ali (Beximco Dhaka)

- Fortune Barishal won the toss and elected to field.

Qualifier 1
14 December 2020
17:30 (D/N)
Scorecard

Gemcon Khulna; 210/7 (20 overs)	v	Gazi Group Chattogram; 163 (19.4 overs)
Jahurul Islam 80 (51); Mustafizur Rahman 2/31 (3.4 overs)		Mohammad Mithun 53 (35); Mashrafe Mortaza 5/35 (4 overs)

Gemcon Khulna won by 47 runs
Sher-e-Bangla National Cricket Stadium, Mirpur
Umpires: Tanvir Ahmed and Masudur Rahman
Player of the match: Mashrafe Mortaza (Gemcon Khulna)

- Gazi Group Chattogram won the toss and elected to field.
- Mashrafe Mortaza (Gemcon Khulna) took his first five-wicket haul in T20s.

Qualifier 2
15 December 2020
16:30 (D/N)
Scorecard

Beximco Dhaka; 116 (20 overs)	v	Gazi Group Chattogram; 117/3 (19.1 overs)
Al-Amin 25 (18); Mustafizur Rahman 3/32 (4 overs)		Litton Das 40 (49); Al-Amin 1/4 (1.1 overs)

Gazi Group Chattogram won by 7 wickets
Sher-e-Bangla National Cricket Stadium, Mirpur
Umpires: Mahfuzur Rahman and Masudur Rahman
Player of the match: Mustafizur Rahman (Gazi Group Chattogram)

- Beximco Dhaka won the toss and elected to bat.

== Final ==
18 December 2020
16:30 (D/N)
Scorecard

Gemcon Khulna; 155/7 (20 overs)	v	Gazi Group Chattogram; 150/6 (20 overs)
Mahmudullah 70* (48); Nahidul Islam 2/19 (3 overs)		Shykat Ali 53 (45); Shohidul Islam 2/33 (4 overs)

Gemcon Khulna won by 5 runs
Sher-e-Bangla National Cricket Stadium, Mirpur
Umpires: Masudur Rahman and Gazi Sohel
Player of the match: Mahmudullah (Gemcon Khulna)

- Gazi Group Chattogram won the toss and elected to field.
