= 2018–19 Dhaka Premier Division Cricket League =

Cricket tournament

- Dates: 8 March – 23 April 2019
- Administrator: Bangladesh Cricket Board
- Cricket format: List A
- Tournament format: Round-robin
- Champions: Abahani Limited (3rd title)
- Participants: 12
- Matches: 84
- Most runs: Saif Hassan (814)
- Most wickets: Farhad Reza (38)

The 2018–19 Dhaka Premier Division Cricket League was an edition of the Dhaka Premier Division Cricket League, a List A cricket competition held in Bangladesh. It was the sixth edition of the tournament with List A status, although around 35 seasons had previously been played before achieving the status. The tournament started on 8 March, and concluded on 23 April 2019. Directly before the List A tournament started, the inaugural edition of the 2018–19 Dhaka Premier Division Twenty20 Cricket League took place, featuring the same twelve teams.

Abahani Limited were the defending champions. They won the tournament, finishing ahead of Legends of Rupganj on net run rate. It was their third List A title, and their 20th overall in the history of the competition. In their final match of the tournament, they beat Sheikh Jamal Dhanmondi Club by nine wickets. Soumya Sarkar scored 208 not out, the highest individual total in List A cricket in Bangladesh, and the first double century in List A cricket by a Bangladeshi batsman. Sarkar's innings also contained 16 sixes, also a record for a List A innings in Bangladesh. Sarkar and Jahurul Islam scored 312 runs for the opening wicket, which was another record for a List A match in Bangladesh.

== Summary ==
Agrani Bank Cricket Club and Kala Bagan Krira Chakra were relegated in the previous tournament, and were replaced by Bangladesh Krira Shikkha Protishtan and Uttara Sporting Club in this edition of the competition. Ahead of the tournament, a players' draft took place.

The round seven fixture between Bangladesh Krira Shikkha Protishtan and Shinepukur Cricket Club ended in a tie. It was only the third tied match in since the competition achieved List A status for the 2013–14 tournament. The round eight fixture between Mohammedan Sporting Club and Brothers Union saw Mohammedan Sporting Club awarded the win, after Brothers Union refused to bat following a rain delay. Brothers Union assessed the pitch after the rain delay, saying that it was not possible to play on the wicket.

Following the conclusion of the group stage fixtures, Legends of Rupganj, Abahani Limited, Prime Bank Cricket Club, Prime Doleshwar Sporting Club, Mohammedan Sporting Club and Sheikh Jamal Dhanmondi Club had all qualified for the Super League section of the tournament. Meanwhile, Brothers Union, Bangladesh Krira Shikkha Protishtan and Uttara Sporting Club finished in the bottom three places in the table, and therefore moved to the Relegation League playoffs, with the bottom two teams being relegated to the Dhaka First Division Cricket League.

Bangladesh Krira Shikkha Protishtan were the first team to be relegated to the Dhaka First Division Cricket League, after they lost to Uttara Sporting Club by one wicket in their first Relegation League fixture. In the final match of the Relegation League phase, Brothers Union beat Bangladesh Krira Shikkha Protishtan by six wickets to ensure their survival, and relegating Uttara Sporting Club in the process. Old DOHS Sports Club and Partex Sporting Club were promoted from the First Division, replacing them for the next season.

== Teams ==
The following teams competed in the tournament:

- Abahani Limited
- Bangladesh Krira Shikkha Protishtan
- Brothers Union
- Gazi Group Cricketers
- Khelaghar Samaj Kallyan Samity
- Legends of Rupganj
- Mohammedan Sporting Club
- Prime Bank Cricket Club
- Prime Doleshwar Sporting Club
- Sheikh Jamal Dhanmondi Club
- Shinepukur Cricket Club
- Uttara Sporting Club

== Points tables ==
Group stage

Team	Pld	W	L	T	Pts	NRR
Legends of Rupganj	11	10	1	0	20	+0.648
Prime Bank Cricket Club	11	8	3	0	16	+0.502
Abahani Limited	11	8	3	0	16	+0.612
Prime Doleshwar Sporting Club	11	7	4	0	14	+0.163
Sheikh Jamal Dhanmondi Club	11	6	5	0	12	–0.057
Mohammedan Sporting Club	11	6	5	0	12	+0.299
Shinepukur Cricket Club	11	5	5	1	11	+0.248
Gazi Group Cricketers	11	5	6	0	10	–0.074
Khelaghar Samaj Kallyan Samity	11	3	8	0	6	–0.391
Brothers Union	11	3	8	0	8	–0.098
Bangladesh Krira Shikkha Protishtan	11	2	8	1	4	–0.666
Uttara Sporting Club	11	2	9	0	4	–1.058

Team qualified for the Super League phase of the tournament

Super League

Team	Pld	W	L	T	Pts	NRR
Abahani Limited	16	13	3	0	26	+0.866
Legends of Rupganj	16	13	3	0	26	+0.517
Prime Doleshwar Sporting Club	16	10	6	0	20	–0.033
Sheikh Jamal Dhanmondi Club	16	9	7	0	18	+0.000
Prime Bank Cricket Club	16	8	8	0	16	+0.000
Mohammedan Sporting Club	16	7	9	0	14	+0.064

Champions

Relegation League

Team	Pld	W	L	T	Pts	NRR
Brothers Union	13	4	9	0	8	–0.385
Uttara Sporting Club	13	4	9	0	8	–0.480
Bangladesh Krira Shikkha Protishtan	13	2	10	1	5	–0.666

Team relegated to the Dhaka First Division Cricket League

== Fixtures ==
=== Round robin ===
==== Round 1 ====
8 March 2019
Scorecard

Abahani Limited; 216/9 (50 overs)	v	Bangladesh Krira Shikkha Protishtan; 156 (40.5 overs)
Jahurul Islam 121* (147); Abu Naser 3/39 (9 overs)		Abdul Kayium 38* (54); Nazmul Islam 3/30 (10 overs)

Abahani Limited won by 60 runs
Sher-e-Bangla National Cricket Stadium, Mirpur
Umpires: Akteruzzaman and Nadir Shah
Player of the match: Jahurul Islam (Abahani Limited)

- Bangladesh Krira Shikkha Protishtan won the toss and elected to field.
- Akbar Ali, Parvez Hossain Emon, Shamim Hossain, Naushad Iqbal, Mahmudul Hasan Joy, Abdul Kayium, Ratul Khan, Sumon Khan and Hasan Murad (Bangladesh Krira Shikkha Protishtan) all made their List A debuts.

8 March 2019
Scorecard

Uttara Sporting Club; 249/4 (50 overs)	v	Sheikh Jamal Dhanmondi Club; 240/9 (50 overs)
Tanzid Hasan 64 (75); Tanbir Hayder 2/22 (7 overs)		Nurul Hasan 65 (65); Abdur Rashid 3/44 (10 overs)

Uttara Sporting Club won by 9 runs
Khan Shaheb Osman Ali Stadium, Fatullah
Umpires: Moniruzzaman and Masudur Rahman
Player of the match: Abdur Rashid (Uttara Sporting Club)

- Sheikh Jamal Dhanmondi Club won the toss and elected to field.
- Minhajul Abedin Afridi (Sheikh Jamal Dhanmondi Club), Anisul Islam Emon, Tanzid Hasan, Sajjad Hossain, Sojib Hossain, Asaduzzaman Payel and Abdur Rashid (Uttara Sporting Club) all made their List A debuts.

8 March 2019
Scorecard

Brothers Union; 220/8 (50 overs)	v	Legends of Rupganj; 221/7 (49.5 overs)
Yasir Ali 65 (69); Muktar Ali 2/38 (10 overs)		Shahriar Nafees 59 (98); Chirag Jani 3/64 (9.5 overs)

Legends of Rupganj won by 3 wickets
Bangladesh Krira Shikkha Protisthan No 3 Ground, Savar
Umpires: Tanvir Ahmed and Ali Arman
Player of the match: Shahriar Nafees (Legends of Rupganj)

- Legends of Rupganj won the toss and elected to field.
- Mehedi Hasan (Brothers Union) made his List A debut.

9 March 2019
Scorecard

Shinepukur Cricket Club; 175 (47.1 overs)	v	Prime Doleshwar Sporting Club; 176/1 (43.4 overs)
Delwar Hossain 40* (59); Farhad Reza 3/32 (9 overs)		Saif Hassan 83* (132); Suhrawadi Shuvo 1/18 (6 overs)

Prime Doleshwar Sporting Club won by 9 wickets
Khan Shaheb Osman Ali Stadium, Fatullah
Umpires: Masudur Rahman and Gazi Sohel
Player of the match: Saif Hassan (Prime Doleshwar Sporting Club)

- Prime Doleshwar Sporting Club won the toss and elected to field.

9 March 2019
Scorecard

Khelaghar Samaj Kallyan Samity; 195 (46.5 overs)	v	Prime Bank Cricket Club; 196/8 (47 overs)
Amit Majumder 36 (70); Ariful Haque 4/24 (7.5 overs)		Rubel Mia 46 (59); Ifran Hossain 3/40 (10 overs)

Prime Bank Cricket Club won by 2 wickets
Sher-e-Bangla National Cricket Stadium, Mirpur
Umpires: Nadir Shah and Sharfuddoula
Player of the match: Ariful Haque (Prime Bank Cricket Club)

- Prime Bank Cricket Club won the toss and elected to field.
- Ifran Hossain (Khelaghar Samaj Kallyan Samity) and Mohor Sheikh (Prime Bank Cricket Club) both made their List A debuts.

9 March 2019
Scorecard

Gazi Group Cricketers; 182 (45.2 overs)	v	Mohammedan Sporting Club; 183/7 (45.3 overs)
Shamsul Islam 71* (111); Shafiul Islam 5/32 (7 overs)		Raqibul Hasan 82* (124); Kamrul Islam Rabbi 2/19 (8 overs)

Mohammedan Sporting Club won by 3 wickets
Bangladesh Krira Shikkha Protisthan No 3 Ground, Savar
Umpires: Tanvir Ahmed and Morshed Ali Khan
Player of the match: Raqibul Hasan (Mohammedan Sporting Club)

- Mohammedan Sporting Club won the toss and elected to field.
- Ruyel Miah (Gazi Group Cricketers) made his List A debut.
- Shafiul Islam (Mohammedan Sporting Club) took his first five-wicket haul in List A cricket.

==== Round 2 ====
11 March 2019
Scorecard

Abahani Limited; 285/6 (50 overs)	v	Uttara Sporting Club; 96 (33 overs)
Najmul Hossain Shanto 83 (84); Nahid Hasan 3/70 (10 overs)		Shakhir Hossain 24 (31); Rubel Hossain 3/16 (5 overs)

Abahani Limited won by 189 runs
Khan Shaheb Osman Ali Stadium, Fatullah
Umpires: Tanvir Ahmed and Akteruzzaman
Player of the match: Sabbir Rahman (Abahani Limited)

- Uttara Sporting Club won the toss and elected to field.

11 March 2019
Scorecard

Sheikh Jamal Dhanmondi Club; 180 (47.5 overs)	v	Brothers Union; 183/3 (36.5 overs)
Elias Sunny 42 (64); Mehedi Hasan 3/25 (10 overs)		Mizanur Rahman 71 (71); Shohidul Islam 2/30 (8 overs)

Brothers Union won by 7 wickets
Sher-e-Bangla National Cricket Stadium, Mirpur
Umpires: Mahfuzur Rahman and Sharfuddoula
Player of the match: Mizanur Rahman (Brothers Union)

- Brothers Union won the toss and elected to field.

11 March 2019
Scorecard

Legends of Rupganj; 357/7 (50 overs)	v	Shinepukur Cricket Club; 334 (49 overs)
Mohammad Naim 122 (108); Hamidul Islam 2/45 (7 overs)		Sabbir Hossain 100 (87); Nabil Samad 3/51 (10 overs)

Legends of Rupganj won by 23 runs
Bangladesh Krira Shikkha Protisthan No 3 Ground, Savar
Umpires: Morshed Ali Khan and Masudur Rahman
Player of the match: Mohammad Naim (Legends of Rupganj)

- Shinepukur Cricket Club won the toss and elected to field.
- Hamidul Islam (Shinepukur Cricket Club) made his List A debut.

12 March 2019
Scorecard

Prime Bank Cricket Club; 301/8 (50 overs)	v	Prime Doleshwar Sporting Club; 302/5 (48.2 overs)
Al-Amin 111 (99); Arafat Sunny 2/34 (10 overs)		Saif Hassan 85 (102); Monir Hossain 2/43 (10 overs)

Prime Doleshwar Sporting Club won by 5 wickets
Bangladesh Krira Shikkha Protisthan No 3 Ground, Savar
Umpires: Nadir Shah and Sharfuddoula
Player of the match: Saad Nasim (Prime Doleshwar Sporting Club)

- Prime Doleshwar Sporting Club won the toss and elected to field.

12 March 2019
Scorecard

Khelaghar Samaj Kallyan Samity; 225 (47.3 overs)	v	Mohammedan Sporting Club; 228/6 (49.2 overs)
Mosaddek Iftekhar 87 (113); Sohag Gazi 3/41 (10 overs)		Raqibul Hasan 84* (88); Robiul Haque 2/41 (10 overs); Tanvir Islam 2/41 (10 overs)

Mohammedan Sporting Club won by 4 wickets
Sher-e-Bangla National Cricket Stadium, Mirpur
Umpires: Mahfuzur Rahman and Masudur Rahman
Player of the match: Raqibul Hasan (Mohammedan Sporting Club)

- Mohammedan Sporting Club won the toss and elected to field.

12 March 2019
Scorecard

Bangladesh Krira Shikkha Protishtan; 249/7 (50 overs)	v	Gazi Group Cricketers; 252/6 (49.2 overs)
Mahmudul Hasan Joy 85 (93); Abu Hider 2/46 (7 overs)		Touhid Tareq 76* (93); Hasan Murad 3/32 (8 overs)

Gazi Group Cricketers won by 4 wickets
Khan Shaheb Osman Ali Stadium, Fatullah
Umpires: Morshed Ali Khan and Gazi Sohel
Player of the match: Touhid Tareq (Gazi Group Cricketers)

- Gazi Group Cricketers won the toss and elected to field.
- Mukidul Islam (Bangladesh Krira Shikkha Protishtan) made his List A debut.

==== Round 3 ====
14 March 2019
Scorecard

Abahani Limited; 236/6 (50 overs)	v	Brothers Union; 222/8 (50 overs)
Mohammad Saifuddin 59* (45); Naeem Islam 2/28 (8 overs)		Yasir Ali 106* (112); Sabbir Rahman 2/21 (5 overs)

Abahani Limited won by 14 runs
Sher-e-Bangla National Cricket Stadium, Mirpur
Umpires: Tanvir Ahmed and Nadir Shah
Player of the match: Mohammad Saifuddin (Abahani Limited)

- Brothers Union won the toss and elected to field.

14 March 2019
Scorecard

Sheikh Jamal Dhanmondi Club; 106 (35.1 overs)	v	Shinepukur Cricket Club; 94 (29 overs)
Ziaur Rahman 41 (58); Sabbir Hossain 4/28 (6 overs)		Sabbir Hossain 26 (25); Ziaur Rahman 5/23 (10 overs)

Sheikh Jamal Dhanmondi Club won by 12 runs
Khan Shaheb Osman Ali Stadium, Fatullah
Umpires: Mahfuzur Rahman and Masudur Rahman
Player of the match: Ziaur Rahman (Sheikh Jamal Dhanmondi Club)

- Shinepukur Cricket Club won the toss and elected to field.
- The match was reduced to 46 overs per side due to rain.
- Amite Hasan (Shinepukur Cricket Club) made his List A debut.

14 March 2019
Scorecard

Legends of Rupganj; 163 (46.1 overs)	v	Prime Bank Cricket Club; 166/1 (31.3 overs)
Mohammad Naim 52 (43); Alok Kapali 2/12 (7.1 overs)		Anamul Haque 100* (111); Nabil Samad 1/36 (10 overs)

Prime Bank Cricket Club won by 9 wickets
Bangladesh Krira Shikkha Protisthan No 3 Ground, Savar
Umpires: Moniruzzaman and Sharfuddoula
Player of the match: Anamul Haque (Prime Bank Cricket Club)

- Prime Bank Cricket Club won the toss and elected to field.

15 March 2019
Scorecard

Prime Doleshwar Sporting Club; 248/8 (50 overs)	v	Mohammedan Sporting Club; 251/9 (50 overs)
Taibur Rahman 72* (83); Alauddin Babu 3/49 (10 overs)		Sohag Gazi 70 (51); Farhad Reza 4/55 (10 overs)

Mohammedan Sporting Club won by 1 wicket
Sher-e-Bangla National Cricket Stadium, Mirpur
Umpires: Masudur Rahman and Sharfuddoula
Player of the match: Sohag Gazi (Mohammedan Sporting Club)

- Mohammedan Sporting Club won the toss and elected to field.

15 March 2019
Scorecard

Khelaghar Samaj Kallyan Samity; 138 (47.5 overs)	v	Gazi Group Cricketers; 142/7 (39.5 overs)
Mahidul Islam Ankon 57 (117); Kamrul Islam Rabbi 5/24 (9 overs)		Parvez Rasool 59* (78); Robiul Haque 5/41 (10 overs)

Gazi Group Cricketers won by 3 wickets
Bangladesh Krira Shikkha Protisthan No 3 Ground, Savar
Umpires: Ali Arman and Gazi Sohel
Player of the match: Kamrul Islam Rabbi (Gazi Group Cricketers)

- Gazi Group Cricketers won the toss and elected to field.

15 March 2019
Scorecard

Bangladesh Krira Shikkha Protishtan; 201/8 (50 overs)	v	Uttara Sporting Club; 181 (49 overs)
Mahmudul Hasan Joy 66 (89); Nahid Hasan 2/30 (8 overs)		Raza Ali Dar 51 (83); Sumon Khan 4/41 (8 overs)

Bangladesh Krira Shikkha Protishtan won by 20 runs
Khan Shaheb Osman Ali Stadium, Fatullah
Umpires: Mahfuzur Rahman and Nadir Shah
Player of the match: Mahmudul Hasan Joy (Bangladesh Krira Shikkha Protishtan)

- Bangladesh Krira Shikkha Protishtan won the toss and elected to bat.

==== Round 4 ====
19 March 2019
Scorecard

Shinepukur Cricket Club; 203/9 (50 overs)	v	Abahani Limited; 206/5 (48.3 overs)
Afif Hossain 48 (57); Mosaddek Hossain 3/41 (10 overs)		Wasim Jaffer 76 (106); Shoriful Islam 3/44 (10 overs)

Abahani Limited won by 5 wickets
Khan Shaheb Osman Ali Stadium, Fatullah
Umpires: Mahfuzur Rahman and Gazi Sohel
Player of the match: Wasim Jaffer (Abahani Limited)

- Abahani Limited won the toss and elected to field.

19 March 2019
Scorecard

Prime Bank Cricket Club; 344/6 (50 overs)	v	Sheikh Jamal Dhanmondi Club; 206/4 (37.1 overs)
Abhimanyu Easwaran 133 (126); Tanbir Hayder 2/27 (5 overs)		Nasir Hossain 76 (76); Nahidul Islam 2/51 (10 overs)

Prime Bank Cricket Club won by 29 runs (D/L method)
Bangladesh Krira Shikkha Protisthan No 3 Ground, Savar
Umpires: Tanvir Ahmed and Morshed Ali Khan
Player of the match: Abhimanyu Easwaran (Prime Bank Cricket Club)

- Sheikh Jamal Dhanmondi Club won the toss and elected to field.

19 March 2019
Scorecard

Mohammedan Sporting Club; 295/7 (50 overs)	v	Legends of Rupganj; 296/6 (49.2 overs)
Abdul Mazid 107 (126); Mohammad Shahid 3/70 (10 overs)		Naeem Islam 85 (92); Shafiul Islam 2/65 (9.2 overs)

Legends of Rupganj won by 4 wickets
Sher-e-Bangla National Cricket Stadium, Mirpur
Umpires: Masudur Rahman and Sharfuddoula
Player of the match: Naeem Islam (Legends of Rupganj)

- Legends of Rupganj won the toss and elected to field.

20 March 2019
Scorecard

Gazi Group Cricketers; 230 (49.1 overs)	v	Prime Doleshwar Sporting Club; 231/4 (45.5 overs)
Parvez Rasool 67 (63); Farhad Reza 5/40 (9.1 overs)		Saif Hassan 102 (124); Kamrul Islam Rabbi 2/39 (8.5 overs)

Prime Doleshwar Sporting Club won by 6 wickets
Sher-e-Bangla National Cricket Stadium, Mirpur
Umpires: Nadir Shah and Sharfuddoula
Player of the match: Farhad Reza (Prime Doleshwar Sporting Club)

- Prime Doleshwar Sporting Club won the toss and elected to field

20 March 2019
Scorecard

Khelaghar Samaj Kallyan Samity; 212/8 (50 overs)	v	Bangladesh Krira Shikkha Protishtan; 185/9 (50 overs)
Robiul Islam Robi 75 (117); Hasan Murad 3/33 (10 overs)		Shamim Hossain 56 (88); Robiul Islam Robi 2/28 (7 overs)

Khelaghar Samaj Kallyan Samity won by 27 runs
Khan Shaheb Osman Ali Stadium, Fatullah
Umpires: Morshed Ali Khan and Moniruzzaman
Player of the match: Robiul Islam Robi (Khelaghar Samaj Kallyan Samity)

- Khelaghar Samaj Kallyan Samity won the toss and elected to bat.

20 March 2019
Scorecard

Uttara Sporting Club; 264/7 (50 overs)	v	Brothers Union; 267/2 (48.2 overs)
Tanzid Hasan 75 (95); Sharifullah 2/44 (10 overs)		Mizanur Rahman 108 (113); Raza Ali Dar 1/32 (8 overs)

Brothers Union won by 8 wickets
Bangladesh Krira Shikkha Protisthan No 3 Ground, Savar
Umpires: Masudur Rahman and Gazi Sohel
Player of the match: Mizanur Rahman (Brothers Union)

- Uttara Sporting Club won the toss and elected to bat.
- Zahiduzzaman (Brothers Union), Minhajul Abedin and Saidul Islam (Uttara Sporting Club) all made their List A debuts.

==== Round 5 ====
22 March 2019
Scorecard

Prime Bank Cricket Club; 302/5 (50 overs)	v	Abahani Limited; 286 (48.5 overs)
Anamul Haque 102 (128); Mosaddek Hossain 1/9 (2 overs)		Wasim Jaffer 94 (91); Al-Amin 3/45 (8 overs)

Prime Bank Cricket Club won by 16 runs
Khan Shaheb Osman Ali Stadium, Fatullah
Umpires: Ali Arman and Nadir Shah
Player of the match: Anamul Haque (Prime Bank Cricket Club)

- Abahani Limited won the toss and elected to field.

22 March 2019
Scorecard

Mohammedan Sporting Club; 240 (49.1 overs)	v	Sheikh Jamal Dhanmondi Club; 242/8 (50 overs)
Abdul Mazid 52 (90); Salauddin Sakil 3/41 (7 overs)		Imtiaz Hossain 74 (102); Sohag Gazi 3/43 (10 overs)

Sheikh Jamal Dhanmondi Club won by 2 wickets
Bangladesh Krira Shikkha Protisthan No 3 Ground, Savar
Umpires: Mahfuzur Rahman and Sharfuddoula
Player of the match: Imtiaz Hossain (Sheikh Jamal Dhanmondi Club)

- Mohammedan Sporting Club won the toss and elected to bat.

22 March 2019
Scorecard

Gazi Group Cricketers; 250/9 (50 overs)	v	Legends of Rupganj; 253/2 (45.3 overs)
Parvez Rasool 86 (80); Muktar Ali 2/54 (10 overs)		Mehedi Maruf 137* (137); Abu Hider 1/41 (6 overs)

Legends of Rupganj won by 8 wickets
Sher-e-Bangla National Cricket Stadium, Mirpur
Umpires: Tanvir Ahmed and Gazi Sohel
Player of the match: Mehedi Maruf (Legends of Rupganj)

- Legends of Rupganj won the toss and elected to field.
- Minhazur Rahman (Legends of Rupganj) made his List A debut.

23 March 2019
Scorecard

Khelaghar Samaj Kallyan Samity; 257/8 (50 overs)	v	Prime Doleshwar Sporting Club; 258/3 (46.4 overs)
Mahidul Islam Ankon 86 (108); Farhad Reza 3/52 (10 overs)		Saif Hassan 132* (134); Mosaddek Iftekhar 1/18 (2 overs)

Prime Doleshwar Sporting Club won by 7 wickets
Bangladesh Krira Shikkha Protisthan No 3 Ground, Savar
Umpires: Mahfuzur Rahman and Sharfuddoula
Player of the match: Saif Hassan (Prime Doleshwar Sporting Club)

- Prime Doleshwar Sporting Club won the toss and elected to field.

23 March 2019
Scorecard

Uttara Sporting Club; 145 (44.4 overs)	v	Shinepukur Cricket Club; 149/2 (25.1 overs)
Minhajul Abedin 51* (73); Sabbir Hossain 3/27 (10 overs)		Sabbir Hossain 99 (72); Jahangir Alam 1/24 (6 overs)

Shinepukur Cricket Club won by 8 wickets
Khan Shaheb Osman Ali Stadium, Fatullah
Umpires: Tanvir Ahmed and Nadir Shah
Player of the match: Sabbir Hossain (Shinepukur Cricket Club)

- Shinepukur Cricket Club won the toss and elected to field.
- Rakibul Hasan (Shinepukur Cricket Club), Abrar Alam, Jahangir Alam, Naimul Islam and Sohel Rana (Uttara Sporting Club) all made their List A debuts.

23 March 2019
Scorecard

Bangladesh Krira Shikkha Protishtan; 267/9 (50 overs)	v	Brothers Union; 265/9 (50 overs)
Shamim Hossain 71 (96); Mohammad Sharif 3/65 (10 overs)		Chirag Jani 96 (120); Mukidul Islam 4/62 (10 overs)

Bangladesh Krira Shikkha Protishtan won by 2 runs
Sher-e-Bangla National Cricket Stadium, Mirpur
Umpires: Ali Arman and Gazi Sohel
Player of the match: Shamim Hossain (Bangladesh Krira Shikkha Protishtan)

- Bangladesh Krira Shikkha Protishtan won the toss and elected to bat.
- Fahad Ahmed and Prantik Nawrose Nabil (Bangladesh Krira Shikkha Protishtan) both made their List A debuts.

==== Round 6 ====
25 March 2019
Scorecard

Mohammedan Sporting Club; 248/7 (50 overs)	v	Abahani Limited; 254/4 (47.3 overs)
Irfan Sukkur 57 (78); Nazmul Islam 3/29 (9 overs)		Jahurul Islam 96 (131); Shahadat Hossain 2/59 (10 overs)

Abahani Limited won by 6 wickets
Sher-e-Bangla National Cricket Stadium, Mirpur
Umpires: Mahfuzur Rahman and Masudur Rahman
Player of the match: Jahurul Islam (Abahani Limited)

- Abahani Limited won the toss and elected to field.

25 March 2019
Scorecard

Sheikh Jamal Dhanmondi Club; 277/6 (50 overs)	v	Gazi Group Cricketers; 234 (47 overs)
Nurul Hasan 81* (81); Parvez Rasool 3/37 (9 overs)		Shamsur Rahman 81 (86); Khaled Ahmed 3/31 (8 overs)

Sheikh Jamal Dhanmondi Club won by 41 runs
Khan Shaheb Osman Ali Stadium, Fatullah
Umpires: Tanvir Ahmed and Gazi Sohel
Player of the match: Asela Gunaratne (Sheikh Jamal Dhanmondi Club)

- Gazi Group Cricketers won the toss and elected to field.

25 March 2019
Scorecard

Khelaghar Samaj Kallyan Samity; 264/3 (50 overs)	v	Legends of Rupganj; 268/5 (49.2 overs)
Ashok Menaria 87* (79); Muktar Ali 1/42 (10 overs)		Mehedi Maruf 108 (134); Moinul Islam 3/42 (10 overs)

Legends of Rupganj won by 5 wickets
Bangladesh Krira Shikkha Protisthan No 3 Ground, Savar
Umpires: Sohrab Hossain and Moniruzzaman
Player of the match: Mehedi Maruf (Legends of Rupganj)

- Legends of Rupganj won the toss and elected to field.

27 March 2019
Scorecard

Bangladesh Krira Shikkha Protishtan; 160 (44.4 overs)	v	Prime Doleshwar Sporting Club; 165/7 (45 overs)
Prantik Nawrose Nabil 30 (69); Arafat Sunny 2/29 (10 overs)		Taibur Rahman 61* (105); Tanzim Hasan Sakib 3/35 (10 overs)

Prime Doleshwar Sporting Club won by 3 wickets
Khan Shaheb Osman Ali Stadium, Fatullah
Umpires: Morshed Ali Khan and Sharfuddoula
Player of the match: Taibur Rahman (Prime Doleshwar Sporting Club)

- Prime Doleshwar Sporting Club won the toss and elected to field.
- Tanzim Hasan Sakib (Bangladesh Krira Shikkha Protishtan) and Imran Uzzaman (Prime Doleshwar Sporting Club) both made their List A debuts.

27 March 2019
Scorecard

Brothers Union; 197/5 (40 overs)	v	Shinepukur Cricket Club; 239/2 (35.4 overs)
Junaid Siddique 74 (86); Shuvagata Hom 2/37 (10 overs)		Unmukt Chand 90* (83); Sharifullah 1/33 (5 overs)

Shinepukur Cricket Club won by 8 wickets (D/L method)
Bangladesh Krira Shikkha Protisthan No 3 Ground, Savar
Umpires: Masudur Rahman and Gazi Sohel
Player of the match: Unmukt Chand (Shinepukur Cricket Club)

- Shinepukur Cricket Club won the toss and elected to field.

27 March 2019
Scorecard

Prime Bank Cricket Club; 230/7 (38 overs)	v	Uttara Sporting Club; 182/8 (38 overs)
Al-Amin 60 (47); Anisul Islam Emon 3/24 (3 overs)		Sheikh Humayun 39* (40); Abdur Razzak 4/15 (8 overs)

Prime Bank Cricket Club won by 57 runs (D/L method)
Sher-e-Bangla National Cricket Stadium, Mirpur
Umpires: Tanvir Ahmed and Nadir Shah
Player of the match: Abdur Razzak (Prime Bank Cricket Club)

- Uttara Sporting Club won the toss and elected to field.
- Sheikh Humayun (Uttara Sporting Club) made his List A debut.

==== Round 7 ====
29 March 2019
Scorecard

Abahani Limited; 286/6 (50 overs)	v	Gazi Group Cricketers; 257 (48.4 overs)
Jahurul Islam 130 (138); Nasum Ahmed 2/47 (10 overs)		Imrul Kayes 126 (118); Mashrafe Mortaza 6/46 (10 overs)

Abahani Limited won by 29 runs
Bangladesh Krira Shikkha Protisthan No 4 Ground, Savar
Umpires: Masudur Rahman and Nadir Shah
Player of the match: Mashrafe Mortaza (Abahani Limited)

- Gazi Group Cricketers won the toss and elected to field.

29 March 2019
Scorecard

Khelaghar Samaj Kallyan Samity; 183/9 (50 overs)	v	Sheikh Jamal Dhanmondi Club; 185/5 (42 overs)
Moinul Islam 55 (70); Taijul Islam 3/39 (10 overs)		Imtiaz Hossain 47 (74); Tanvir Islam 2/31 (10 overs)

Sheikh Jamal Dhanmondi Club won by 5 wickets
Khan Shaheb Osman Ali Stadium, Fatullah
Umpires: Shafiuddin Ahmed and Habibur Rahman
Player of the match: Taijul Islam (Sheikh Jamal Dhanmondi Club)

- Sheikh Jamal Dhanmondi Club won the toss and elected to field.

29 March 2019
Scorecard

Legends of Rupganj; 265/9 (50 overs)	v	Prime Doleshwar Sporting Club; 193 (46 overs)
Shahriar Nafees 68 (104); Farhad Reza 4/52 (10 overs)		Saad Nasim 61 (62); Mohammad Shahid 4/23 (9 overs)

Legends of Rupganj won by 72 runs
Sher-e-Bangla National Cricket Stadium, Mirpur
Umpires: Sharfuddoula and Gazi Sohel
Player of the match: Mohammad Shahid (Legends of Rupganj)

- Prime Doleshwar Sporting Club won the toss and elected to field.

30 March 2019
Scorecard

Mohammedan Sporting Club; 193 (45.1 overs)	v	Uttara Sporting Club; 194/3 (40 overs)
Nadif Chowdhury 39 (55); Abdur Rashid 3/32 (9 overs)		Tanzid Hasan 101* (120); Shahadat Hossain 2/35 (7 overs)

Uttara Sporting Club won by 7 wickets
Bangladesh Krira Shikkha Protisthan No 4 Ground, Savar
Umpires: Tanvir Ahmed and Gazi Sohel
Player of the match: Tanzid Hasan (Uttara Sporting Club)

- Uttara Sporting Club won the toss and elected to field.

30 March 2019
Scorecard

Brothers Union; 330/2 (50 overs)	v	Prime Bank Cricket Club; 331/5 (48.5 overs)
Fazle Mahmud 149* (147); Nayeem Hasan 1/62 (10 overs)		Abhimanyu Easwaran 90 (96); Sajidul Islam 3/70 (10 overs)

Prime Bank Cricket Club won by 5 wickets
Sher-e-Bangla National Cricket Stadium, Mirpur
Umpires: Morshed Ali Khan and Mahfuzur Rahman
Player of the match: Fazle Mahmud (Brothers Union)

- Prime Bank Cricket Club won the toss and elected to field.
- Nur Alam Saddam (Prime Bank Cricket Club) made his List A debut.

30 March 2019
Scorecard

Bangladesh Krira Shikkha Protishtan; 222/8 (50 overs)	v	Shinepukur Cricket Club; 222/9 (50 overs)
Prantik Nawrose Nabil 81 (139); Delwar Hossain 3/33 (6 overs)		Unmukt Chand 74 (87); Hasan Murad 3/41 (10 overs)

Match tied
Khan Shaheb Osman Ali Stadium, Fatullah
Umpires: Imran Parvez and Nadir Shah
Player of the match: Abdul Kayium (Bangladesh Krira Shikkha Protishtan)

- Bangladesh Krira Shikkha Protishtan won the toss and elected to bat.
- Sadman Rahman (Bangladesh Krira Shikkha Protishtan) made his List A debut.

==== Round 8 ====
1 April 2019
Scorecard

Abahani Limited; 262 (48.4 overs)	v	Khelaghar Samaj Kallyan Samity; 130 (32.5 overs)
Najmul Hossain Shanto 60 (79); Robiul Haque 5/64 (9.4 overs)		Mosaddek Iftekhar 36* (58); Sunzamul Islam 4/36 (9.5 overs)

Abahani Limited won by 132 runs
Bangladesh Krira Shikkha Protisthan No 4 Ground, Savar
Umpires: Imran Parvez and Gazi Sohel
Player of the match: Najmul Hossain Shanto (Abahani Limited)

- Khelaghar Samaj Kallyan Samity won the toss and elected to field.
- Shahriar Komol (Khelaghar Samaj Kallyan Samity) made his List A debut.

1 April 2019
Scorecard

Prime Doleshwar Sporting Club; 239/6 (26 overs)	v	Sheikh Jamal Dhanmondi Club; 238/9 (26 overs)
Imran Uzzaman 75 (54); Salauddin Sakil 3/40 (6 overs)		Ziaur Rahman 46 (21); Farhad Reza 3/35 (6 overs)

Prime Doleshwar Sporting Club won by 1 run
Sher-e-Bangla National Cricket Stadium, Mirpur
Umpires: Mahfuzur Rahman and Masudur Rahman
Player of the match: Farhad Reza (Prime Doleshwar Sporting Club)

- Sheikh Jamal Dhanmondi Club won the toss and elected to field.
- The match was reduced to 26 overs per side due to rain.

1 April 2019
Scorecard

Bangladesh Krira Shikkha Protishtan; 181/9 (50 overs)	v	Legends of Rupganj; 182/5 (45 overs)
Shamim Hossain 52 (107); Rishi Dhawan 5/51 (10 overs)		Mominul Haque 93 (112); Abdul Kayium 2/28 (6 overs)

Legends of Rupganj won by 5 wickets
Khan Shaheb Osman Ali Stadium, Fatullah
Umpires: Moniruzzaman and Sharfuddoula
Player of the match: Rishi Dhawan (Legends of Rupganj)

- Legends of Rupganj won the toss and elected to field.

2 April 2019
Scorecard

Gazi Group Cricketers; 235/9 (50 overs)	v	Uttara Sporting Club; 138 (31 overs)
Shamsur Rahman 51 (55); Abdur Rashid 3/43 (10 overs)		Anisul Islam Emon 50 (29); Sanjit Saha 4/20 (7 overs)

Gazi Group Cricketers won by 49 runs (D/L method)
Sher-e-Bangla National Cricket Stadium, Mirpur
Umpires: Morshed Ali Khan and Mahfuzur Rahman
Player of the match: Mahedi Hasan (Gazi Group Cricketers)

- Uttara Sporting Club won the toss and elected to field.

2 April 2019
Scorecard

Mohammedan Sporting Club; 316/9 (50 overs)	v	Brothers Union
Irfan Sukkur 92 (105); Sajidul Islam 3/43 (8 overs)

Mohammedan Sporting Club were awarded the match
(opposition refused to play)
Bangladesh Krira Shikkha Protisthan No 4 Ground, Savar
Umpires: Masudur Rahman and Gazi Sohel

- Brothers Union won the toss and elected to field.

2 April 2019
Scorecard

Shinepukur Cricket Club; 245/8 (50 overs)	v	Prime Bank Cricket Club; 100/9 (20 overs)
Towhid Hridoy 83 (117); Ariful Haque 3/37 (6 overs)		Abhimanyu Easwaran 39 (35); Delwar Hossain 3/16 (3 overs)

Shinepukur Cricket Club won by 48 runs (D/L method)
Khan Shaheb Osman Ali Stadium, Fatullah
Umpires: Habibur Rahman and Nadir Shah
Player of the match: Towhid Hridoy (Shinepukur Cricket Club)

- Shinepukur Cricket Club won the toss and elected to bat.

==== Round 9 ====
4 April 2019
Scorecard

Prime Doleshwar Sporting Club; 224/9 (50 overs)	v	Abahani Limited; 227/6 (48.5 overs)
Farhad Hossain 47 (60); Soumya Sarkar 4/34 (10 overs)		Jahurul Islam 91* (127); Abu Jayed 2/47 (9.5 overs)

Abahani Limited won by 4 wickets
Khan Shaheb Osman Ali Stadium, Fatullah
Umpires: Masudur Rahman and Nadir Shah
Player of the match: Jahurul Islam (Abahani Limited)

- Abahani Limited won the toss and elected to field.

4 April 2019
Scorecard

Sheikh Jamal Dhanmondi Club; 141 (43.2 overs)	v	Legends of Rupganj; 145/2 (28.4 overs)
Tanbir Hayder 35 (67); Nabil Samad 3/30 (10 overs)		Mohammad Naim 63 (69); Elias Sunny 1/21 (3.4 overs)

Legends of Rupganj won by 8 wickets
Bangladesh Krira Shikkha Protisthan No 4 Ground, Savar
Umpires: Shafiuddin Ahmed and Habibur Rahman
Player of the match: Nabil Samad (Legends of Rupganj)

- Legends of Rupganj won the toss and elected to field.

4 April 2019
Scorecard

Khelaghar Samaj Kallyan Samity; 257/4 (50 overs)	v	Uttara Sporting Club; 218/8 (50 overs)
Mahidul Islam Ankon 77* (80); Sheikh Humayun 2/40 (10 overs); Mohimenul Khan 2/40 (10 overs)		Mohimenul Khan 93 (127); Robiul Islam Robi 2/18 (7 overs)

Khelaghar Samaj Kallyan Samity won by 39 runs
Sher-e-Bangla National Cricket Stadium, Mirpur
Umpires: Tanvir Ahmed and Sharfuddoula
Player of the match: Mahidul Islam Ankon (Khelaghar Samaj Kallyan Samity)

- Uttara Sporting Club won the toss and elected to field.

5 April 2019
Scorecard

Gazi Group Cricketers; 206 (49.4 overs)	v	Brothers Union; 197 (48.5 overs)
Kamran Ghulam 81 (101); Sajidul Islam 4/54 (9.4 overs)		Junaid Siddique 72 (106); Nasum Ahmed 5/49 (8.5 overs)

Gazi Group Cricketers won by 9 runs
Bangladesh Krira Shikkha Protisthan No 4 Ground, Savar
Umpires: Shafiuddin Ahmed and Nadir Shah
Player of the match: Nasum Ahmed (Gazi Group Cricketers)

- Brothers Union won the toss and elected to field.

5 April 2019
Scorecard

Mohammedan Sporting Club; 324 (49.3 overs)	v	Shinepukur Cricket Club; 325/8 (49.4 overs)
Litton Das 84 (89); Delwar Hossain 5/46 (7.3 overs)		Afif Hossain 97 (86); Sohag Gazi 2/40 (10 overs)

Shinepukur Cricket Club won by 2 wickets
Sher-e-Bangla National Cricket Stadium, Mirpur
Umpires: Mahfuzur Rahman and Masudur Rahman
Player of the match: Delwar Hossain (Shinepukur Cricket Club)

- Shinepukur Cricket Club won the toss and elected to field.

5 April 2019
Scorecard

Prime Bank Cricket Club; 222/8 (50 overs)	v	Bangladesh Krira Shikkha Protishtan; 50 (22 overs)
Abhimanyu Easwaran 92 (109); Hasan Murad 2/35 (10 overs)		Parvez Hossain Emon 15 (37); Al-Amin Hossain 5/20 (8 overs)

Prime Bank Cricket Club won by 172 runs
Khan Shaheb Osman Ali Stadium, Fatullah
Umpires: Morshed Ali Khan and Moniruzzaman
Player of the match: Al-Amin Hossain (Prime Bank Cricket Club)

- Prime Bank Cricket Club won the toss and elected to bat.

==== Round 10 ====
7 April 2019
Scorecard

Abahani Limited; 122 (39.1 overs)	v	Legends of Rupganj; 125/4 (26.5 overs)
Mosaddek Hossain 40* (88); Subashis Roy 3/37 (8 overs)		Mehedi Maruf 59 (85); Sabbir Rahman 1/13 (1.5 overs)

Legends of Rupganj won by 6 wickets
Sher-e-Bangla National Cricket Stadium, Mirpur
Umpires: Mahfuzur Rahman and Gazi Sohel
Player of the match: Subashis Roy (Legends of Rupganj)

- Legends of Rupganj won the toss and elected to field.

7 April 2019
Scorecard

Bangladesh Krira Shikkha Protishtan; 161 (42.1 overs)	v	Sheikh Jamal Dhanmondi Club; 165/5 (35.2 overs)
Akbar Ali 43 (53); Nasir Hossain 3/27 (8 overs)		Anustup Majumdar 43 (68); Sumon Khan 2/25 (6 overs)

Sheikh Jamal Dhanmondi Club won by 5 wickets
Bangladesh Krira Shikkha Protisthan No 4 Ground, Savar
Umpires: Tanvir Ahmed and Ali Arman
Player of the match: Elias Sunny (Sheikh Jamal Dhanmondi Club)

- Sheikh Jamal Dhanmondi Club won the toss and elected to field.

7 April 2019
Scorecard

Uttara Sporting Club; 160 (46.4 overs)	v	Prime Doleshwar Sporting Club; 161/5 (38.1 overs)
Minhajul Abedin 36 (54); Saad Nasim 4/42 (10 overs)		Farhad Hossain 59 (96); Sajjad Hossain 3/41 (10 overs)

Prime Doleshwar Sporting Club won by 5 wickets
Khan Shaheb Osman Ali Stadium, Fatullah
Umpires: Imran Parvez and Sharfuddoula
Player of the match: Saad Nasim (Prime Doleshwar Sporting Club)

- Prime Doleshwar Sporting Club won the toss and elected to field.
- Sabuj Barman (Uttara Sporting Club) made his List A debut.

8 April 2019
Scorecard

Brothers Union; 267/6 (50 overs)	v	Khelaghar Samaj Kallyan Samity; 84/1 (20 overs)
Fazle Mahmud 103 (116); Robiul Islam Robi 1/28 (7 overs)		Robiul Islam Robi 39* (69)

Khelaghar Samaj Kallyan Samity won by 12 runs (D/L method)
Khan Shaheb Osman Ali Stadium, Fatullah
Umpires: Tanvir Ahmed and Gazi Sohel
Player of the match: Fazle Mahmud (Brothers Union)

- Khelaghar Samaj Kallyan Samity won the toss and elected to field.

8 April 2019
Scorecard

Shinepukur Cricket Club; 177/9 (48 overs)	v	Gazi Group Cricketers; 106/4 (21.5 overs)
Delwar Hossain 40* (52); Sanjit Saha 4/25 (10 overs)		Shamsur Rahman 53* (65); Mustafizur Rahman 3/23 (6.5 overs)

Gazi Group Cricketers won by 21 runs (D/L method)
Sher-e-Bangla National Cricket Stadium, Mirpur
Umpires: Imran Parvez and Mahfuzur Rahman
Player of the match: Sanjit Saha (Gazi Group Cricketers)

- Gazi Group Cricketers won the toss and elected to field.

8 April 2019
Scorecard

Mohammedan Sporting Club; 296/9 (50 overs)	v	Prime Bank Cricket Club; 150/9 (39.1 overs)
Raqibul Hasan 102 (104); Monir Hossain 2/37 (10 overs)		Nahidul Islam 28 (31); Sohag Gazi 4/21 (7 overs)

Mohammedan Sporting Club won by 133 runs (D/L method)
Bangladesh Krira Shikkha Protisthan No 4 Ground, Savar
Umpires: Morshed Ali Khan and Nadir Shah
Player of the match: Raqibul Hasan (Mohammedan Sporting Club)

- Prime Bank Cricket Club won the toss and elected to field.

==== Round 11 ====
10 April 2019
Scorecard

Abahani Limited; 211/9 (50 overs)	v	Sheikh Jamal Dhanmondi Club; 215/7 (48.5 overs)
Mosaddek Hossain 101* (139); Nasir Hossain 3/24 (10 overs)		Anustup Majumdar 56 (82); Soumya Sarkar 2/29 (7 overs)

Sheikh Jamal Dhanmondi Club won by 3 wickets
Bangladesh Krira Shikkha Protisthan No 4 Ground, Savar
Umpires: Mahfuzur Rahman and Nadir Shah
Player of the match: Nasir Hossain (Sheikh Jamal Dhanmondi Club)

- Sheikh Jamal Dhanmondi Club won the toss and elected to field.
- Abdullah Al Mamun (Abahani Limited) made his List A debut.

10 April 2019
Scorecard

Uttara Sporting Club; 180/8 (50 overs)	v	Legends of Rupganj; 181/1 (40.4 overs)
Anisul Islam Emon 55 (73); Nabil Samad 3/29 (10 overs)		Mohammad Naim 63 (77); Mohimenul Khan 1/34 (10 overs)

Legends of Rupganj won by 9 wickets
Sher-e-Bangla National Cricket Stadium, Mirpur
Umpires: Imran Parvez and Habibur Rahman
Player of the match: Nabil Samad (Legends of Rupganj)

- Legends of Rupganj won the toss and elected to field.

10 April 2019
Scorecard

Prime Doleshwar Sporting Club; 250/5 (50 overs)	v	Brothers Union; 251/9 (49.5 overs)
Taibur Rahman 70* (71); Bishawnath Halder 2/45 (10 overs)		Fazle Mahmud 74 (91); Arafat Sunny 4/62 (10 overs)

Brothers Union won by 1 wicket
Khan Shaheb Osman Ali Stadium, Fatullah
Umpires: Tanvir Ahmed and Sharfuddoula
Player of the match: Fazle Mahmud (Brothers Union)

- Brothers Union won the toss and elected to field.

11 April 2019
Scorecard

Khelaghar Samaj Kallyan Samity; 190 (48.2 overs)	v	Shinepukur Cricket Club; 165/6 (41 overs)
Masum Khan 40 (55); Delwar Hossain 3/27 (10 overs)		Shadman Islam 64 (112); Robiul Islam Robi 2/26 (8 overs)

Shinepukur Cricket Club won by 15 runs (D/L method)
Sher-e-Bangla National Cricket Stadium, Mirpur
Umpires: Tanvir Ahmed and Ali Arman
Player of the match: Shadman Islam (Shinepukur Cricket Club)

- Shinepukur Cricket Club won the toss and elected to field

11 April 2019
Scorecard

Prime Bank Cricket Club; 201/9 (50 overs)	v	Gazi Group Cricketers; 167 (45.2 overs)
Ariful Haque 34 (38); Sanjit Saha 3/30 (10 overs)		Myshukur Rahaman 74 (124); Alok Kapali 2/13 (6.2 overs)

Prime Bank Cricket Club won by 34 runs
Bangladesh Krira Shikkha Protisthan No 4 Ground, Savar
Umpires: Sharfuddoula and Gazi Sohel
Player of the match: Nayeem Hasan (Prime Bank Cricket Club)

- Prime Bank Cricket Club won the toss and elected to bat.

11 April 2019
Scorecard

Bangladesh Krira Shikkha Protishtan; 249/7 (50 overs)	v	Mohammedan Sporting Club; 252/9 (49.5 overs)
Aminul Islam 60 (92); Rahatul Ferdous 3/37 (10 overs)		Avishek Mitra 65 (69); Hasan Murad 4/30 (10 overs)

Mohammedan Sporting Club won by 1 wicket
Khan Shaheb Osman Ali Stadium, Fatullah
Umpires: Shafiuddin Ahmed and Nadir Shah
Player of the match: Avishek Mitra (Mohammedan Sporting Club)

- Bangladesh Krira Shikkha Protishtan won the toss and elected to bat.

=== Super League ===
15 April 2019
Scorecard

Legends of Rupganj; 313/4 (50 overs)	v	Mohammedan Sporting Club; 267 (46.2 overs)
Naeem Islam 108* (108); Mohammad Ashraful 2/44 (10 overs)		Irfan Sukkur 73 (91); Subashis Roy 3/56 (9 overs)

Legends of Rupganj won by 46 runs
Bangladesh Krira Shikkha Protisthan No 3 Ground, Savar
Umpires: Habibur Rahman and Nadir Shah
Player of the match: Naeem Islam (Legends of Rupganj)

- Mohammedan Sporting Club won the toss and elected to field.

15 April 2019
Scorecard

Prime Bank Cricket Club; 236 (48.3 overs)	v	Sheikh Jamal Dhanmondi Club; 237/4 (48.4 overs)
Ariful Haque 74 (51); Elias Sunny 3/35 (10 overs)		Nasir Hossain 112* (110); Nahidul Islam 2/30 (10 overs)

Sheikh Jamal Dhanmondi Club won by 6 wickets
Khan Shaheb Osman Ali Stadium, Fatullah
Umpires: Morshed Ali Khan and Sharfuddoula
Player of the match: Elias Sunny (Sheikh Jamal Dhanmondi Club)

- Sheikh Jamal Dhanmondi Club won the toss and elected to field.

15 April 2019
Scorecard

Abahani Limited; 251 (49 overs)	v	Prime Doleshwar Sporting Club; 86 (29.4 overs)
Wasim Jaffer 71 (97); Abu Jayed 3/47 (9 overs)		Mahmudul Hasan 27* (65); Mohammad Saifuddin 5/9 (6 overs)

Abahani Limited won by 165 runs
Sher-e-Bangla National Cricket Stadium, Mirpur
Umpires: Tanvir Ahmed and Gazi Sohel
Player of the match: Mohammad Saifuddin (Abahani Limited)

- Prime Doleshwar Sporting Club won the toss and elected to field.

17 April 2019
Scorecard

Legends of Rupganj; 171 (49.3 overs)	v	Sheikh Jamal Dhanmondi Club; 172/6 (48.3 overs)
Mohammad Naim 58 (112); Khaled Ahmed 4/31 (7.3 overs)		Elias Sunny 58 (99); Nabil Samad 3/27 (10 overs)

Sheikh Jamal Dhanmondi Club won by 4 wickets
Khan Shaheb Osman Ali Stadium, Fatullah
Umpires: Ali Arman and Nadir Shah
Player of the match: Elias Sunny (Sheikh Jamal Dhanmondi Club)

- Legends of Rupganj won the toss and elected to bat.

17 April 2019
Scorecard

Prime Bank Cricket Club; 169 (48.1 overs)	v	Prime Doleshwar Sporting Club; 172/3 (43.4 overs)
Alok Kapali 61 (87); Farhad Reza 4/22 (9.1 overs)		Saif Hassan 55 (108); Monir Hossain 1/23 (10 overs)

Prime Doleshwar Sporting Club won by 7 wickets
Sher-e-Bangla National Cricket Stadium, Mirpur
Umpires: Morshed Ali Khan and Mahfuzur Rahman
Player of the match: Farhad Reza (Prime Doleshwar Sporting Club)

- Prime Doleshwar Sporting Club won the toss and elected to field.

17 April 2019
Scorecard

Abahani Limited; 304/7 (50 overs)	v	Mohammedan Sporting Club; 259 (46.3 overs)
Sabbir Rahman 64 (53); Shafiul Islam 3/63 (9 overs)		Raqibul Hasan 96 (79); Mosaddek Hossain 3/36 (8 overs)

Abahani Limited won by 45 runs
Bangladesh Krira Shikkha Protisthan No 3 Ground, Savar
Umpires: Imran Parvez and Masudur Rahman
Player of the match: Mosaddek Hossain (Abahani Limited)

- Abahani Limited won the toss and elected to bat.

19 April 2019
Scorecard

Prime Bank Cricket Club; 226 (49.3 overs)	v	Abahani Limited; 228/4 (44.4 overs)
Alok Kapali 80 (112); Mohammad Saifuddin 5/32 (9.3 overs)		Najmul Hossain Shanto 77* (84); Nayeem Hasan 2/49 (8.4 overs)

Abahani Limited won by 6 wickets
Sher-e-Bangla National Cricket Stadium, Mirpur
Umpires: Mahfuzur Rahman and Nadir Shah
Player of the match: Mohammad Saifuddin (Abahani Limited)

- Abahani Limited won the toss and elected to field.

19 April 2019
Scorecard

Mohammedan Sporting Club; 159 (44.4 overs)	v	Sheikh Jamal Dhanmondi Club; 163/3 (33.3 overs)
Tushar Imran 56 (85); Tanbir Hayder 4/16 (4.4 overs)		Nurul Hasan 83* (85); Shafiul Islam 1/12 (3 overs)

Sheikh Jamal Dhanmondi Club won by 7 wickets
Khan Shaheb Osman Ali Stadium, Fatullah
Umpires: Moniruzzaman and Sharfuddoula
Player of the match: Nurul Hasan (Sheikh Jamal Dhanmondi Club)

- Sheikh Jamal Dhanmondi Club won the toss and elected to field.

19 April 2019
Scorecard

Prime Doleshwar Sporting Club; 205 (45 overs)	v	Legends of Rupganj; 208/3 (44.2 overs)
Shykat Ali 72 (95); Taskin Ahmed 4/54 (9 overs)		Shahriar Nafees 113* (142); Manik Khan 1/32 (7 overs)

Legends of Rupganj won by 7 wickets
Bangladesh Krira Shikkha Protisthan No 3 Ground, Savar
Umpires: Ali Arman and Morshed Ali Khan
Player of the match: Shahriar Nafees (Legends of Rupganj)

- Prime Doleshwar Sporting Club won the toss and elected to bat.

21 April 2019
Scorecard

Abahani Limited; 377/7 (50 overs)	v	Legends of Rupganj; 275/7 (50 overs)
Soumya Sarkar 106 (79); Taskin Ahmed 2/57 (5 overs)		Mohammad Naim 123* (135); Mehedi Hasan 3/65 (10 overs)

Abahani Limited won by 102 runs
Bangladesh Krira Shikkha Protisthan No 3 Ground, Savar
Umpires: Habibur Rahman and Nadir Shah
Player of the match: Soumya Sarkar (Abahani Limited)

- Abahani Limited won the toss and elected to bat.

21 April 2019
Scorecard

Prime Bank Cricket Club; 174 (42.2 overs)	v	Mohammedan Sporting Club; 175/3 (35 overs)
Alok Kapali 43 (55); Saqlain Sajib 4/40 (10 overs)		Abdul Mazid 54 (71); Nahidul Islam 1/27 (7 overs)

Mohammedan Sporting Club won by 7 wickets
Sher-e-Bangla National Cricket Stadium, Mirpur
Umpires: Akteruzzaman and Mozahiduzzaman
Player of the match: Saqlain Sajib (Mohammedan Sporting Club)

- Mohammedan Sporting Club won the toss and elected to field.

21 April 2019
Scorecard

Sheikh Jamal Dhanmondi Club; 243 (49.3 overs)	v	Prime Doleshwar Sporting Club; 244/3 (38.3 overs)
Tanbir Hayder 69 (63); Farhad Reza 3/44 (9.3 overs)		Saif Hassan 148* (116); Taijul Islam 2/44 (8.3 overs)

Prime Doleshwar Sporting Club won by 7 wickets
Bangladesh Krira Shikkha Protisthan No 4 Ground, Savar
Umpires: Ali Arman and Moniruzzaman
Player of the match: Saif Hassan (Prime Doleshwar Sporting Club)

- Prime Doleshwar Sporting Club won the toss and elected to field.
- Aslam Hossain and Rejaur Rahman Raja (Prime Doleshwar Sporting Club) both made their List A debuts.

23 April 2019
Scorecard

Sheikh Jamal Dhanmondi Club; 317/9 (50 overs)	v	Abahani Limited; 319/1 (47.1 overs)
Tanbir Hayder 132* (115); Mashrafe Mortaza 4/56 (10 overs)		Soumya Sarkar 208* (153); Imtiaz Hossain 1/10 (3 overs)

Abahani Limited won by 9 wickets
Bangladesh Krira Shikkha Protisthan No 3 Ground, Savar
Umpires: Habibur Rahman and Nadir Shah
Player of the match: Soumya Sarkar (Abahani Limited)

- Sheikh Jamal Dhanmondi Club won the toss and elected to bat.

23 April 2019
Scorecard

Prime Doleshwar Sporting Club; 274/6 (50 overs)	v	Mohammedan Sporting Club; 271/9 (50 overs)
Farhad Hossain 89 (76); Shafiul Islam 2/39 (10 overs)		Mohammad Ashraful 76 (97); Taibur Rahman 3/34 (8 overs)

Prime Doleshwar Sporting Club won by 3 runs
Khan Shaheb Osman Ali Stadium, Fatullah
Umpires: Masudur Rahman and Sharfuddoula
Player of the match: Farhad Hossain (Prime Doleshwar Sporting Club)

- Mohammedan Sporting Club won the toss and elected to field.

23 April 2019
Scorecard

Legends of Rupganj; 327/4 (50 overs)	v	Prime Bank Cricket Club; 239 (42.1 overs)
Mohammad Naim 136 (130); Nahidul Islam 1/52 (9 overs)		Nahidul Islam 74 (57); Mohammad Shahid 4/22 (6.1 overs)

Legends of Rupganj won by 88 runs
Sher-e-Bangla National Cricket Stadium, Mirpur
Umpires: Shafiuddin Ahmed and Ali Arman
Player of the match: Mohammad Naim (Legends of Rupganj)

- Prime Bank Cricket Club won the toss and elected to field.

=== Relegation League ===
16 April 2019
Scorecard

Uttara Sporting Club; 313/6 (50 overs)	v	Brothers Union; 125 (29.2 overs)
Shanaj Ahmed 114 (106); Bishawnath Halder 3/56 (9 overs)		Zahiduzzaman 42 (30); Mohimenul Khan 5/38 (10 overs)

Uttara Sporting Club won by 188 runs
Bangladesh Krira Shikkha Protisthan No 4 Ground, Savar
Umpires: Shafiuddin Ahmed and Habibur Rahman
Player of the match: Mohimenul Khan (Uttara Sporting Club)

- Brothers Union won the toss and elected to field.

18 April 2019
Scorecard

Bangladesh Krira Shikkha Protishtan; 144 (49.4 overs)	v	Uttara Sporting Club; 147/9 (39.5 overs)
Aminul Islam 59 (117); Abdur Rashid 5/18 (9.4 overs)		Manan Sharma 52 (59); Tanzim Hasan Sakib 4/36 (10 overs)

Uttara Sporting Club won by 1 wicket
Bangladesh Krira Shikkha Protisthan No 4 Ground, Savar
Umpires: Imran Parvez and Habibur Rahman
Player of the match: Abdur Rashid (Uttara Sporting Club)

- Bangladesh Krira Shikkha Protishtan won the toss and elected to bat.
- Humayan Ahmed (Bangladesh Krira Shikkha Protishtan) made his List A debut.

21 April 2019
Scorecard

Bangladesh Krira Shikkha Protishtan; 235/7 (50 overs)	v	Brothers Union; 241/4 (47.2 overs)
Aminul Islam 90* (105); Mohammad Shahzada 2/47 (10 overs)		Fazle Mahmud 127* (117); Sadman Rahman 1/21 (3.2 overs)

Brothers Union won by 6 wickets
Khan Shaheb Osman Ali Stadium, Fatullah
Umpires: Shafiuddin Ahmed and Shyful Islam
Player of the match: Fazle Mahmud (Brothers Union)

- Bangladesh Krira Shikkha Protisthan won the toss and elected to bat.
- Mujibul Hussain (Bangladesh Krira Shikkha Protishtan) and Shariful Islam (Brothers Union) both made their List A debuts.
