= List of North Zone cricketers (Bangladesh) =

This is presenting a complete list in alphabetical order of cricketers who have played for North Zone in first-class, List A or Twenty20 matches since the team was formed ahead of the 2012–13 season for the first Bangladesh Cricket League (BCL) competition. North Zone is a composite regional team which combines two divisional teams, Rajshahi and Rangpur. Complying with other team lists, details are the player's name followed by his years active as a North Zone player, current players to the end of the 2015–16 season.

== A ==
- Ariful Haque (2014–15 to 2015–16)

== D ==
- Delwar Hossain (2014–15 to 2015–16)
- Dhiman Ghosh (2015–16)

== F ==
- Farhad Hossain (2012–13 to 2015–16)
- Farhad Reza (2012–13 to 2014–15)

== H ==
- Hamidul Islam (2013–14 to 2014–15)

== J ==
- Jahurul Islam (2012–13 to 2015–16)
- Junaid Siddique (2012–13 to 2015–16)

== M ==
- Mahmudul Hasan (2014–15 to 2015–16)
- Myshukur Rahaman (2012–13 to 2015–16)
- Mamun Hossain (2015–16)
- Muktar Ali (2013–14 to 2015–16)
- Mushfiqur Rahim (2012–13 to 2014–15)

== N ==
- Naeem Islam (2012–13 to 2015–16)
- Nasir Hossain (2012–13 to 2015–16)
- Nazmul Hossain Shanto (2014–15 to 2015–16)
- Nazmul Hossain (2013–14)

== S ==
- Sabbir Rahman (2012–13 to 2014–15)
- Sajidul Islam (2012–13)
- Sanjamul Islam (2012–13 to 2015–16)
- Saqlain Sajib (2012–13 to 2015–16)
- Shafaq Al Zabir (2015–16)
- Shafiul Islam (2012–13)
- Subashis Roy (2012–13 to 2015–16)
- Suhrawadi Shuvo (2012–13 to 2013–14)

== T ==
- Taijul Islam (2013–14 to 2015–16)
- Tanveer Haider (2012–13 to 2013–14)
- Touhid Tareq (2014–15)
