= List of Rajshahi Division cricketers =

This is presenting a complete list in alphabetical order of cricketers who have played for Rajshahi Division in first-class, List A or Twenty20 matches since the team was formed ahead of the 1999–2000 season for the first National Cricket League (NCL) competition. Complying with other club lists, details are the player's name followed by his years active as a Rajshahi player, current players to the end of the 2015–16 season.

Please to note that this list excludes players who appeared for the team in 1999–2000 only. This is because the NCL was not a first-class competition in its opening season.

== A ==
- Abdullah Alam (2001–02 to 2003–04)
- Abdur Rahim (2000–01)
- Alamgir Kabir (2000–01 to 2008–09)
- Alauddin Babu (2010–11)
- Aminul Islam (1999–2000 to 2003–04)
- Anisul Islam (2000–01)
- Anisur Rahman (1999–2000 to 2012–13)
- Arif Hossain (2006–07)
- Arif Reza (2013)
- Ashraful Islam (2003–04 to 2004–05)
- Avishek Mitra (2009–10 to 2015–16)

== B ==
- Aiden Blizzard (Australia; 2009–10)

== D ==
- Delwar Hossain (2006–07 to 2015–16)
- Dhiman Ghosh (2009–10 to 2010–11)

== F ==
- Faisal Khan (2001–02)
- Farhad Hossain (2004–05 to 2015–16)
- Farhad Reza (2004–05 to 2015–16)
- Farid Hossain (1999–2000 to 2001–02)

== G ==
- Golam Mortaza (2003–04)

== H ==
- Habibur Rahman (2011–12 to 2014–15)
- Hamidul Islam (2006–07 to 2015–16)
- Hannan Sarkar (2009–10)
- Hasanuzzaman (2001–02 to 2006–07)
- Humayun Kabir (2000–01 to 2003–04)

== I ==
- Imran Parvez (1999–2000 to 2003–04)

== J ==
- Jahurul Islam (2002–03 to 2015–16)
- Jamal Faisal (1999–2000 to 2001–02)
- Jamiul Alam (2002–03 to 2003–04)
- Jubair Ahmed (2004–05 to 2015–16)
- Junaid Siddique (2003–04 to 2015–16)
- Jakir Hossain

== K ==
- Kamrul Hasan (2005–06 to 2006–07)
- Khaled Mashud (1999–2000 to 2010–11)

== L ==
- Lalmohon Hossain (2006–07)
- Kaushal Lokuarachchi (Sri Lanka; 2009–10)

== M ==
- Mahbub Alam (2001–02 to 2008–09)
- Mizanur Rahman (2007–08 to 2015–16)
- Mohaiminul Khan (2014–15 to 2015–16)
- Mohammad Kalim (1999–2000 to 2001–02)
- Mohammad Mostadir (1999–2000 to 2002–03)
- Mohammad Nuruzzaman (1999–2000 to 2005–06)
- Mohammad Shahzada (2003–04 to 2015–16)
- Mohimenul Islam (2010–11)
- Moniruzzaman (2004–05 to 2005–06)
- Moynul Islam (2015–16)
- Muktar Ali (2009–10 to 2015–16)
- Murad Khan (1999–2000 to 2003–04)
- Mushfiqur Rahim (2006–07 to 2015–16)
- Mushfiqur Rahman (1999–2000 to 2008–09)
- Myshukur Rahaman (2010–11 to 2014–15)

== N ==
- Nadif Chowdhury (2009–10)
- Nadim Ahmed (2000–01 to 2001–02)
- Naeem Islam senior (2004–05 to 2010–11)
- Naeem Islam junior (2010–11)
- Nasir Hossain (2009–10 to 2010–11)
- Nazmul Hossain Shanto (2015–16)
- Nehaduzzaman (2014–15 to 2015–16)

== O ==
- Omar Sharif (2000–01)

== P ==
- Pappa Sharma (2003–04)

== Q ==
- Qaiser Abbas (Pakistan; 2009–10)

== R ==
- Rabiul Karim (2006–07 to 2011–12)
- Rafikul Khan (1999–2000 to 2008–09)
- Rahat Sadek (2008–09 to 2010–11)
- Raqibul Hasan (2003–04 to 2006–07)
- Rezwanul Islam (2000–01 to 2005–06)
- Rubaiyat Haque (2004–05)

== S ==
- Sabbir Rahman (2008–09 to 2015–16)
- Saifullah Khan (1999–2000 to 2005–06)
- Sanjamul Islam (2008–09 to 2015–16)
- Saqlain Sajib (2006–07 to 2014–15)
- Saymon Ahmed (2009–10)
- Shafaq Al Zabir (2002–03 to 2015–16)
- Shafiul Islam (2006–07 to 2014–15)
- Shakhir Hossain (2015–16)
- Shakil Haider (2007–08 to 2008–09)
- Shamimul Haque (2001–02 to 2005–06)
- Shuvagata Hom (2009–10)
- Sohel Rana (2001–02 to 2003–04)
- Subashis Roy (2009–10 to 2010–11)
- Suhrawadi Shuvo (2004–05 to 2010–11)
- Sumon Saha (2004–05 to 2012–13)

== T ==
- Taijul Islam (2010–11 to 2015–16)
- Tanmoy Ghosh (2015–16)
- Taposh Ghosh (2009–10)
- Tareque Ahmed (1999–2000 to 2003–04)
- Tariqul Islam (1999–2000 to 2002–03)
- Touhid Tareq (2014–15 to 2015–16)
