= Naimul Islam =

Bangladeshi cricketer (born 2000)

Personal information
- Born: 3 September 2000 (age 26)
- Source: ESPNcricinfo, 26 February 2019

Naimul Islam (born 3 September 2000) is a Bangladeshi cricketer. He made his Twenty20 debut for Uttara Sporting Club in the 2018–19 Dhaka Premier Division Twenty20 Cricket League on 26 February 2019. His List A debut was also for the same team, in the 2018–19 Dhaka Premier Division Cricket League on 23 March 2019.
