= Abdul Kayium =

Bangladeshi cricketer (born 1998)

Personal information
- Full name: Abdul Kayium Tuhin
- Born: 17 October 1998 (age 28); Munshiganj, Bangladesh
- Batting: Right-handed
- Bowling: Right-arm offbreak
- Source: ESPNcricinfo, 25 February 2019

Abdul Kayium Tuhin (born 17 October 1998) is a Bangladeshi cricketer. In 2009, while in seventh grade, he joined Bangladesh Krira Shikkha Protishtan, the national sports institute. He captained their cricket team during the 2017–2018 season, leading it to a second-place finish in the first division and promotion to the Dhaka Premier League.

He made his Twenty20 debut for Bangladesh Krira Shikkha Protishtan in the 2018–19 Dhaka Premier Division Twenty20 Cricket League on 25 February 2019. He made his List A debut for Bangladesh Krira Shikkha Protishtan in the 2018–19 Dhaka Premier Division Cricket League on 8 March 2019.
