= 2012–13 Bangladesh Cricket League =

Cricket tournament

- Dates: 27 December 2012 – 25 February 2013
- Administrator(s): Bangladesh Cricket Board
- Cricket format: First-class
- Tournament format(s): Round-robin and Final
- Host(s): Bangladesh
- Champions: Central Zone (1st title)
- Runners-up: North Zone
- Participants: 4
- Matches: 7
- Most runs: Marshal Ayub (465)
- Most wickets: Shohag Gazi (19)

The 2012–13 Bangladesh Cricket League is inaugural edition of the Bangladesh Cricket League (BCL), a first-class cricket competition that is being held in Bangladesh from 27 December 2012 to 25 February 2013.

Central Zone won the tournament, after they beat North Zone by 31 runs in the Final.

== Venue ==
Dhaka	Bogra
Sher-e-Bangla National Cricket Stadium	Shaheed Chandu Stadium
Capacity: 25,416	Capacity: 10,000
Matches:4	Matches:3

== Points table ==
Team	Pld	W	L	D	A	Pts
Central Zone	3	0	0	3	0	14
North Zone	3	1	0	2	0	13
South Zone	3	1	1	1	0	10
East Zone	3	0	1	2	0	9

- Advance to final.

For an outright win the winners get 6 (six) points. No points for the side defeated. In the case of a drawn game where both teams have completed their respective first innings, the team having a first innings lead gets 3 (three) points. The side behind on first innings runs gets 1 (one) point. In a drawn game where the teams have not completed first innings 3 (three) points will be awarded to each team. For a tie with first innings completed by both teams 3 (three) points will be awarded to each. If there is no outright result and scores are tied in the first innings then 3 (three) points will be awarded to each team. In case of a washed out/abandoned game both teams will get 3 (three) points. Bonus Points

For scoring a minimum of 300 runs in 100 or lesser number of overs in the first innings 1 (one) batting point will be awarded. For bowling out a side in the first innings 1 (one) bowling point will be awarded. For an innings victory 1 (one) point will be awarded. For a 10-wicket win 1 (one) point will be awarded.

== Final ==
20-25 February 2013
Scorecard

Central Zone	v	North Zone
277 (75.5 Overs); Raqibul Hasan 125 (204); Farhad Reza 4/18 (11)		274 (79.1 Overs); Nasir Hossain 74 (88); Mosharraf Hossain 4/65 (24.1)
247 (68 Overs); Raqibul Hasan 68 (106); Sunzamul Islam 8/73 (20)		219 (65.1 Overs); Jahurul Islam 81 (133); Elias Sunny 3/26 (11)

Central Zone won by 31 runs.
Sher-e-Bangla Cricket Stadium, Dhaka
Umpires: Anisur Rahman and Enamul Haque
Player of the match: Raqibul Hasan and Sunzamul Islam

- North Zone won the toss and elected to field first
