= Sadman Rahman =

Bangladeshi cricketer (born 2001)

Personal information
- Born: 19 September 2001 (age 25)
- Source: Cricinfo, 30 March 2019

Sadman Rahman (born 19 September 2001) is a Bangladeshi cricketer. He made his Twenty20 debut for Bangladesh Krira Shikkha Protishtan in the 2018–19 Dhaka Premier Division Twenty20 Cricket League on 26 February 2019. He made his List A debut for Bangladesh Krira Shikkha Protishtan in the 2018–19 Dhaka Premier Division Cricket League on 30 March 2019.
