= Hasan Murad =

Bangladeshi cricketer (born 2001)

Personal information
- Full name: Hasan Murad
- Born: 1 July 2001 (age 25); Cox's Bazar, Bangladesh
- Batting: Right-handed
- Bowling: Slow left-arm orthodox
- Role: Bowler

International information
- National side: Bangladesh
- Test debut (cap 108): 11 November 2025 v Ireland
- Last Test: 19 November 2025 v Ireland
- T20I debut (cap 87): 6 October 2023 v India
- Last T20I: 7 October 2023 v Pakistan

Career statistics
Competition	T20I	FC	LA	T20
Matches	2	37	65	37
Runs scored	0	327	157	26
Batting average	–	7.97	6.03	4.33
100s/50s	0/0	0/0	0/0	0/0
Top score	–	27	21	7*
Balls bowled	12	7,368	3,591	666
Wickets	0	154	94	40
Bowling average	–	23.15	25.02	19.80
5 wickets in innings	0	13	0	0
10 wickets in match	0	0	0	0
Best bowling	–	8/119	4/19	3/21
Catches/stumpings	0/–	18/–	19/–	11/–
Medal record
Men's Cricket
Representing Bangladesh
ICC U-19 World Cup
Winner	2020 South Africa
Asian Games
Bronze medal – third place	2022 Hangzhou	Team
- Source: Cricinfo, 12 October 2025

Hasan Murad (born 1 July 2001) is a Bangladeshi cricketer. He made his Twenty20 debut for Bangladesh Krira Shikkha Protishtan in the 2018–19 Dhaka Premier Division Twenty20 Cricket League on 25 February 2019. He made his List A debut for Bangladesh Krira Shikkha Protishtan in the 2018–19 Dhaka Premier Division Cricket League on 8 March 2019. He was the leading wicket-taker for Bangladesh Krira Shikkha Protishtan in the 2018–19 Dhaka Premier Division Cricket League tournament, with 22 dismissals in 13 matches. In December 2019, he was named in Bangladesh's squad for the 2020 Under-19 Cricket World Cup.

He made his first-class debut for Chittagong Division in the 2020–21 National Cricket League on 22 March 2021. He made his international debut against India in the semifinal match of the Asian Games on 6 October 2023.
