= Minhajul Abedin (cricketer, born 1997) =

Bangladeshi cricketer (born 1997)

Personal information
- Born: 12 September 1997 (age 29); Comilla, Bangladesh
- Source: ESPNcricinfo, 20 March 2019

Minhajul Abedin (born 12 September 1997) is a Bangladeshi cricketer. He made his Twenty20 debut for Uttara Sporting Club against Sheikh Jamal Dhanmondi Club in the 2018–19 Dhaka Premier Division Twenty20 Cricket League on 27 February 2019. He made his List A debut for Uttara Sporting Club in the 2018–19 Dhaka Premier Division Cricket League on 20 March 2019. He made his first-class debut on 7 November 2021, for Dhaka Metropolis in the 2021–22 National Cricket League.
