= 2013–14 Bangladesh Cricket League =

- Dates: 13 May 2014 – 12 January 2014
- Administrator: Bangladesh Cricket Board
- Cricket format: First-class cricket
- Tournament format(s): Round Robin & Final
- Host: Bangladesh
- Champions: South Zone (1st title)
- Runners-up: North Zone
- Participants: 4
- Matches: 7
- Player of the series: Taijul Islam (North Zone)
- Most runs: Imrul Kayes (511)
- Most wickets: Taijul Islam (41)

The 2013–14 Bangladesh Cricket League was the 2nd edition of the Bangladesh Cricket League (BCL), a first-class cricket competition that was held in Bangladesh from 12 January 2014 to 13 May 2014. Central Zone were champion of the previous season, having beaten North Zone by 31 runs in the final.

South Zone became the champion of the 2013–14 season, by defeating North Zone by 213 runs in the final.

== Venue ==
Dhaka	Dhaka
Sher-e-Bangla National Cricket Stadium	BKSP Cricket Grounds
Capacity: 25,416	Capacity: 2,000
Matches: 1	Matches: 6

== Points table ==
Team	Pld	W	L	D	NR	Pts
North Zone	3	2	0	1	0	54
South Zone (C)	3	1	1	1	0	41
Central Zone	3	1	1	1	0	14
East Zone	3	0	2	1	0	18

- Two teams advance to the Final.

== Final ==
09-13 February 2014
Scorecard

South Zone	v	North Zone
271 (83 overs); Soumya Sarkar 70 (131); Taijul Islam 8/86 (31)		235 (97.5 overs); Nasir Hossain 70 (113); Al-amin Hossain 4/35 (17)
536 (116.3 overs); Imrul Kayes 204 (266); Subashis Roy 3/128 (22)		359 (87.4 overs); Farhad Hossain 129 (219); Abdur Razzak 6/102 (32.4)

South Zone won by 213 runs.
Sher-e-Bangla National Cricket Stadium, Dhaka
Umpires: Enamul Haque and Leslie Reifer
Player of the match: Imrul Kayes

- North Zone won the toss and elected to field first.

== Extra Links ==
- ESPNCricinfo
