= Mosaddek =

Mosaddek (Bengali: মোসাদ্দেক) is a Bangladeshi given name. Notable people with the name include:

- Mosaddek Hossain Bulbul (born 1965), Bangladesh politician
- Mosaddek Ali Falu (born 1960), Bangladeshi entrepreneur and a politician
- Mosaddek Hossain (born 1995), Bangladeshi cricketer
- Mosaddek Hossain (cricketer, born 1983) (born 1983), Bangladeshi cricketer
- Mosaddek Iftekhar (born 1989), Bangladeshi cricketer
