= Jahangir Alam (cricketer, born 1991) =

Bangladeshi cricketer (born 1991)

Personal information
- Born: 6 June 1991 (age 35); Rajshahi, Bangladesh
- Source: Cricinfo, 23 March 2019

Jahangir Alam (born 6 June 1991) is a Bangladeshi cricketer. He made his List A debut for Uttara Sporting Club in the 2018–19 Dhaka Premier Division Cricket League on 23 March 2019.
