= Sheikh Humayun =

Bangladeshi cricketer (born 1986)

Personal information
- Born: 1 January 1986 (age 40)
- Source: Cricinfo, 25 April 2019

Sheikh Humayun (born 1 January 1986) is a Bangladeshi cricketer. He made his List A debut for Uttara Sporting Club in the 2018–19 Dhaka Premier Division Cricket League on 27 March 2019.
