= Saidul Islam =

Bangladeshi cricketer (born 1996)

Personal information
- Born: 10 September 1996 (age 30)
- Source: ESPNcricinfo, 20 March 2019

Saidul Islam (born 10 September 1996) is a Bangladeshi cricketer. He made his List A debut for Uttara Sporting Club in the 2018–19 Dhaka Premier Division Cricket League on 20 March 2019.
