= Sojib Hossain =

Bangladeshi cricketer (born 1999)

Personal information
- Born: 1999 (age 26–27)
- Source: Cricinfo, 8 March 2019

Sojib Hossain (born 1999) is a Bangladeshi cricketer. He made his List A debut for Uttara Sporting Club in the 2018–19 Dhaka Premier Division Cricket League on 8 March 2019.
