= Abdur Rashid (cricketer) =

Bangladeshi cricketer (born 1987)

Personal information
- Born: 1 October 1987 (age 39); Rajshahi, Bangladesh
- Source: ESPNcricinfo, 30 March 2019

Abdur Rashid (born 1 October 1987) is a Bangladeshi cricketer, who plays as a right-arm medium bowler. He made his Twenty20 debut for Uttara Sporting Club in the 2018–19 Dhaka Premier Division Twenty20 Cricket League on 26 February 2019. His List A debut was also for the same team, in the 2018–19 Dhaka Premier Division Cricket League on 8 March 2019. He was the leading wicket-taker for Uttara Sporting Club in the 2018–19 Dhaka Premier Division Cricket League tournament, with 16 dismissals in 10 matches.
