= 2015 Bangladesh Cricket League =

- Dates: 27 May 2015 – 21 April 2015
- Administrator(s): Bangladesh Cricket Board
- Cricket format: First-class cricket
- Tournament format(s): Round Robin
- Host(s): Bangladesh
- Champions: South Zone (2nd title)
- Participants: 4
- Matches: 6
- Most runs: Alok Kapali (408)
- Most wickets: Abdur Razzak (18)

2015 Bangladesh Cricket League is third edition of Bangladesh Cricket League, this is a First-class cricket tournament held by Bangladesh from 21 April to 27 May 2015.। South Zone were champion on previous edition. They beat North Zone by 213 runs in Final.

South Zone remains championship of this season

== Venue ==
| Dhaka | Chittagong | Narayanganj |
|---|---|---|
| Sher-e-Bangla National Cricket Stadium | Zohur Ahmed Chowdhury Stadium | Khan Shaheb Osman Ali Stadium |
| Capacity: 25,416 | Capacity: 20,000 | Capacity: 25,000 |
| Matches: 1 | Matches: 3 | Matches: 2 |

== Points table ==
| Team | Pld | w | L | D | NR | P |
|---|---|---|---|---|---|---|
| South Zone (C) | 3 | 1 | 0 | 2 | 0 | 46 |
| East Zone | 3 | 1 | 0 | 2 | 0 | 39 |
| Central Zone | 3 | 1 | 1 | 1 | 0 | 33 |
| North Zone | 3 | 0 | 1 | 2 | 0 | 18 |

- Champion

== Extra Links ==
- ESPN Cricinfo
