= Shamim Hossain =

Bangladeshi cricketer (born 2000)

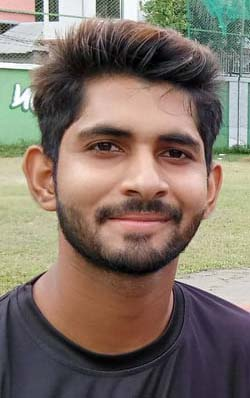

Personal information
- Full name: Shamim Hossain Patwary
- Born: 2 September 2000 (age 26); Chandpur, Bangladesh
- Batting: Left-handed
- Bowling: Right-arm off break
- Role: All-rounder

International information
- National side: Bangladesh (2021–present)
- ODI debut (cap 144): 3 September 2023 v Afghanistan
- Last ODI: 8 July 2025 v Sri Lanka
- ODI shirt no.: 29
- T20I debut (cap 71): 23 July 2021 v Zimbabwe
- Last T20I: 2 May 2026 v New Zealand
- T20I shirt no.: 29

Career statistics
Competition	ODI	T20I	FC	LA
Matches	6	31	16	90
Runs scored	67	420	725	2,081
Batting average	11.16	21.00	31.52	31.53
100s/50s	0/0	0/1	0/7	1/15
Top score	22	51	84*	108*
Balls bowled	90	81	30	1,549
Wickets	2	2	1	29
Bowling average	35.00	51.00	10.00	41.68
5 wickets in innings	0	0	0	0
10 wickets in match	0	0	0	0
Best bowling	1/22	1/10	1/3	3/25
Catches/stumpings	3/0	11/0	16/0	37/0
Medal record
Men's Cricket
Representing Bangladesh
ICC U-19 World Cup
Winner	2020 South Africa
- Source: Cricinfo, 5 June 2026

Shamim Hossain Patwary (Bengali: শামীম হোসাইন পাটোয়ারী; born 2 September 2000) is a Bangladeshi cricketer. He made his international debut for the Bangladesh cricket team in July 2021 against Zimbabwe.

== Career ==
=== Domestic cricket ===
Shamim made his first-class debut for Chittagong Division in the 2017–18 National Cricket League on 15 September 2017. He made his Twenty20 debut for Bangladesh Krira Shikkha Protishtan in the 2018–19 Dhaka Premier Division Twenty20 Cricket League on 25 February 2019. He made his List A debut for Bangladesh Krira Shikkha Protishtan in the 2018–19 Dhaka Premier Division Cricket League on 8 March 2019.

=== International cricket ===
In December 2019, Shamim was named in Bangladesh's squad for the 2020 Under-19 Cricket World Cup. In February 2021, he was selected in the Bangladesh Emerging squad for their home series against the Ireland Wolves.

In June 2021, he was named in Bangladesh's Twenty20 International (T20I) squad for their series against Zimbabwe. In the second T20I match, he made his debut against Zimbabwe and scored 29 off 13 balls. In the third T20I match he scored an unbeaten 31 runs off 15 balls, helping Bangladesh to chase down the target of 193 and win the series 2–1.

In September 2021, he was named in Bangladesh's squad for the 2021 ICC Men's T20 World Cup.

In March 2023, he was added to Bangladesh One Day International (ODI) squad for their series against England. In the same month, he was selected to play for Bangladesh in the T20I series against Ireland. On 31 March 2023, in the third T20I, he scored 51 runs off 42 balls to complete his maiden half-century in T20I cricket.

In August 2023, he was named in Bangladesh's squad for the 2023 Asia Cup. He made his ODI debut during a crucial group stage fixture against Afghanistan on 3 September 2023 during the 2023 Asla Cup. He announced his arrival to ODI cricket by hitting a six off the very first delivery he faced on his ODI debut by dispatching an ordinary delivery bowled by Gulbadin Naib over deep square leg. His shot was even considered special by viewers given he flicked the length ball on the pads without looking directly at the ball. He eventually became the first Bangladeshi batsman to hit a six off the first delivery he faced in his ODI career and the sixth batsman ever to hit a six off the first ball faced on ODI debut.
