= List of Bangladesh Twenty20 International cricketers =

This is a list of Bangladeshi Twenty20 International cricketers.

A Twenty20 International is an international cricket match between two representative teams, as determined by the International Cricket Council (ICC). A Twenty20 International is played under the rules of Twenty20 cricket. This list comprises all members of the Bangladesh cricket team who have played at least one T20I match. It is initially arranged in the order in which each player won his first Twenty20 cap. When more than one player won his first Twenty20 cap in the same match, those players are listed alphabetically by surname.

== Key ==
General

- ‡ – Captain
- † – Wicket-keeper
- First – Year of debut
- Last – Year of latest game
- Mat – Number of matches played

Batting

- Runs – Runs scored in career
- HS – Highest score
- Avg – Runs scored per dismissal
- * – Batsman remained not out
- 50 – Number of half centuries
- 100 – Centuries scored

Bowling

- Balls – Balls bowled in career
- Wkt – Wickets taken in career
- BBI – Best bowling in an innings
- Ave – Average runs per wicket

Fielding

- Ca – Catches taken
- St – Stumpings taken

== Players ==
Statistics are correct as of 2 December 2025.

Bangladesh T20I cricketers
General					Batting					Bowling				Fielding		Ref
Cap	Name	First	Last	Mat	Runs	HS	Avg	50	100	Balls	Wkt	BBI	Ave	Ca	St	Ref
1	Abdur Razzak	2006	2014	34	41	9	4.10	0	0	730	44	4/16	19.04	10	–	
2	Aftab Ahmed	2006	2010	11	228	62*	22.80	1	0	2	0	–	–	4	–	
3	Farhad Reza	2006	2014	13	72	19	8.00	0	0	156	6	2/34	43.50	4	–	
4	Mashrafe Mortaza ‡	2006	2017	54	377	36	13.46	0	0	1,139	42	4/19	36.35	10	–	
5	Mohammad Rafique	2006	2006	1	13	13	13.00	0	0	24	1	1/22	22.00	0	–	
6	Mushfiqur Rahim ‡†	2006	2022	102	1,500	72*	19.48	6	0	–	–	–	–	42	30	
7	Nadif Chowdhury	2006	2007	3	27	12	9.00	0	0	–	–	–	–	0	–	
8	Nazmus Sadat	2006	2006	1	4	4	4.00	0	0	–	–	–	–	0	–	
9	Shahadat Hossain	2006	2013	6	8	4*	4.00	0	0	120	4	2/22	49.50	0	–	
10	Shahriar Nafees ‡	2006	2006	1	25	25	25.00	0	0	–	–	–	–	1	–	
11	Shakib Al Hasan ‡	2006	2024	129	2,551	84	23.19	13	0	2,745	149	5/20	20.91	31	–	
12	Alok Kapali	2007	2011	7	57	19	11.40	0	0	30	2	2/12	17.50	2	–	
13	Mahmudullah ‡	2007	2024	141	2,444	64*	23.50	8	0	950	41	3/10	27.68	51	–	
14	Mohammad Ashraful ‡	2007	2013	23	450	65	19.56	2	0	138	8	3/42	26.25	4	–	
15	Nazimuddin	2007	2008	7	178	81	25.42	1	0	–	–	–	–	0	–	
16	Syed Rasel	2007	2008	8	7	6	3.50	0	0	174	4	1/10	50.50	1	–	
17	Tamim Iqbal (Note: Tamim Iqbal also played for World XI. Only his records for Bangladesh are given above.)	2007	2020	74	1,701	103*	24.65	7	1	–	–	–	–	18	–	
18	Junaid Siddique	2007	2012	7	159	71	22.71	1	0	–	–	–	–	1	–	
19	Dhiman Ghosh †	2008	2008	1	1	1	1.00	0	0	–	–	–	–	0	1	
20	Mehrab Hossain, Jr.	2008	2009	2	16	10	16.00	0	0	17	0	–	–	0	–	
21	Naeem Islam	2008	2013	10	130	28	14.44	0	0	90	3	2/32	40.66	2	–	
22	Raqibul Hasan	2008	2010	5	51	18	10.20	0	0	–	–	–	–	1	–	
23	Rubel Hossain	2009	2021	28	17	8*	3.40	0	0	579	28	3/31	32.57	1	–	
24	Nazmul Hossain	2009	2012	4	3	3*	–	0	0	42	1	1/15	67.00	0	–	
25	Shafiul Islam	2010	2020	20	23	16	4.60	0	0	400	20	3/36	26.60	1	–	
26	Imrul Kayes	2010	2017	14	119	36	9.15	0	0	–	–	–	–	4	–	
27	Suhrawadi Shuvo	2010	2010	1	1	1*	–	0	0	6	0	–	–	0	–	
28	Jahurul Islam	2010	2013	3	31	18	10.33	0	0	–	–	–	–	3	–	
29	Nasir Hossain	2011	2016	31	370	50*	18.50	2	0	179	7	2/26	37.42	15	–	
30	Abul Hasan	2012	2018	5	14	9	7.00	0	0	84	4	2/33	37.00	0	–	
31	Elias Sunny	2012	2012	7	9	5	4.50	0	0	138	9	5/13	16.22	4	–	
32	Ziaur Rahman	2012	2014	14	117	40*	13.00	0	0	75	3	1/16	42.33	4	–	
33	Anamul Haque †	2012	2022	20	445	58	24.72	1	0	–	–	–	–	4	1	
34	Mominul Haque	2012	2014	6	60	26*	20.00	0	0	18	0	–	–	1	–	
35	Sohag Gazi	2012	2015	10	57	24	14.25	0	0	210	4	1/28	74.75	2	–	
36	Shamsur Rahman	2013	2014	9	86	53	10.75	1	0	–	–	–	–	2	–	
37	Sajidul Islam	2013	2013	1	–	–	–	–	–	6	0	–	–	1	–	
38	Robiul Islam	2013	2013	1	–	–	–	–	–	6	0	–	–	0	–	
39	Al-Amin Hossain	2013	2020	31	7	5*	3.50	0	0	614	43	3/20	16.97	4	–	
40	Arafat Sunny	2014	2016	10	34	10	11.33	0	0	186	12	2/17	19.16	1	–	
41	Mohammad Mithun	2014	2021	17	127	47	10.58	0	0	–	–	–	–	4	–	
42	Sabbir Rahman	2014	2022	48	977	80	23.26	4	0	73	6	3/11	13.16	25	–	
43	Taskin Ahmed	2014	2025	86	223	31	9.69	0	0	1,820	106	4/16	22.19	12	–	
44	Mustafizur Rahman	2015	2025	126	112	15	5.60	0	0	2,730	158	6/10	20.96	29	–	
45	Soumya Sarkar	2015	2024	85	1,408	68	17.60	5	0	288	12	2/19	37.58	46	–	
46	Litton Das ‡†	2015	2025	120	2,655	83	23.49	16	0	–	–	–	–	77	15	
47	Rony Talukdar	2015	2023	11	224	67	22.40	1	0	–	–	–	–	2	1	
48	Jubair Hossain	2015	2015	1	–	–	–	–	–	12	2	2/20	10.00	0	–	
49	Nurul Hasan †	2016	2025	55	570	42*	18.38	0	0	–	–	–	–	24	9	
50	Shuvagata Hom	2016	2016	5	35	16*	17.50	0	0	66	2	1/18	35.50	1	–	
51	Abu Hider	2016	2018	13	58	22*	58.00	0	0	216	6	2/40	55.00	2	–	
52	Mohammad Shahid	2016	2016	1	–	–	–	–	–	18	1	1/32	32.00	0	–	
53	Mosaddek Hossain ‡	2016	2022	33	389	48*	18.52	0	0	331	18	5/20	22.11	13	–	
54	Muktar Ali	2016	2016	1	19	19*	–	0	0	12	0	–	–	0	–	
55	Saqlain Sajib	2016	2016	1	–	–	–	–	–	21	0	–	–	0	–	
56	Mohammad Saifuddin	2017	2025	47	272	39*	20.92	0	0	964	52	4/33	26.42	12	–	
57	Mehidy Hasan	2017	2025	34	418	46	16.72	0	0	468	18	4/12	37.05	16	–	
58	Afif Hossain	2018	2023	69	1,109	77*	20.53	3	0	204	12	3/11	21.66	19	–	
59	Ariful Haque	2018	2018	9	59	18*	14.75	0	0	6	1	1/13	13.00	5	–	
60	Mohammad Nazmul Islam	2018	2018	13	18	7	18.00	0	0	231	8	3/28	33.12	2	–	
61	Zakir Hasan	2018	2023	4	11	10	2.75	0	0	–	–	–	–	1	–	
62	Abu Jayed	2018	2018	3	3	2	1.50	0	0	66	4	2/27	26.50	1	–	
63	Mahedi Hasan	2018	2025	70	427	33	11.86	0	0	1,457	68	4/11	24.05	26	–	
64	Taijul Islam	2019	2019	2	0	0*	–	0	0	42	1	1/26	58.00	0	–	
65	Aminul Islam	2019	2021	10	35	9	11.66	0	0	188	12	3/34	19.83	1	–	
66	Najmul Hossain Shanto	2019	2025	50	987	71	22.95	4	0	18	0	–	–	30	–	
67	Mohammad Naim	2019	2025	38	860	81	23.88	4	0	–	–	–	–	19	–	
68	Hasan Mahmud	2020	2025	26	50	26*	25.00	0	0	534	28	3/33	24.75	8	–	
69	Nasum Ahmed	2021	2025	49	115	20	8.84	0	0	951	49	4/10	22.95	8	–	
70	Shoriful Islam	2021	2025	59	89	16*	5.93	0	0	1,160	63	3/17	24.88	11	–	
71	Shamim Hossain	2021	2025	47	579	51	18.67	1	0	103	2	1/10	67.50	17	–	
72	Saif Hassan ‡	2021	2025	21	443	69	26.05	4	0	103	2	2/18	61.00	10	–	
73	Shohidul Islam	2021	2021	1	–	–	–	–	–	23	1	1/33	33.00	0	–	
74	Munim Shahriar	2022	2022	5	34	17	6.80	0	0	–	–	–	–	2	–	
75	Yasir Ali	2022	2023	11	128	42*	16.00	0	0	–	–	–	–	7	–	
76	Parvez Hossain Emon	2022	2025	30	607	100	21.67	3	1	–	–	–	–	11	–	
77	Ebadot Hossain	2022	2022	4	–	–	–	–	–	91	7	3/51	20.00	0	–	
78	Towhid Hridoy	2023	2025	57	1,177	83*	27.37	5	0	2	0	–	–	18	–	
79	Tanvir Islam	2023	2025	6	12	8	12.00	0	0	102	4	1/17	34.00	1	–	
80	Rishad Hossain	2023	2025	55	213	53	8.52	1	0	1,100	71	3/18	20.97	29	0	
81	Jaker Ali †	2023	2025	48	752	72*	25.06	3	0	–	–	–	–	22	3	
82	Mahmudul Hasan Joy	2023	2023	3	5	5	2.50	0	0	2	0	–	–	2	–	
83	Ripon Mondol	2023	2023	3	0	0	0.00	0	0	42	4	3/14	15.00	0	–	
84	Rakibul Hasan	2023	2023	3	18	14	18.00	0	0	36	2	1/19	20.50	0	–	
85	Shahadat Hossain	2023	2023	3	26	21	13.00	0	0	–	–	–	–	0	–	
86	Sumon Khan	2023	2023	1	–	–	–	–	–	12	0	–	–	0	–	
87	Hasan Murad	2023	2023	2	–	–	–	–	–	12	0	–	–	0	–	
88	Mrittunjoy Chowdhury	2023	2023	1	4	4	4.00	0	0	6	0	–	–	1	–	
89	Tanzim Hasan Sakib	2023	2025	40	195	50	13.00	1	0	845	47	4/7	24.72	19	–	
90	Tanzid Hasan	2024	2025	45	1,20	89	28.00	11	0	–	–	–	–	26	–	
91	Nahid Rana	2025	2025	1	–	–	–	–	–	24	2	2/50	25.00	3	–	
92	Khaled Ahmed	2025	2025	1	–	–	–	–	–	24	0	–	–	0	–	

== See also ==
- Twenty20 International
- Bangladesh national cricket team
- List of Bangladesh Test cricketers
- List of Bangladesh ODI cricketers
