= Mohammad Saifuddin =

Bangladeshi cricketer (born 1996)

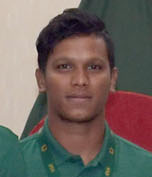
- Saif in 2019

Personal information
- Full name: Mohammad Saifuddin
- Born: 1 November 1996 (age 30); Feni, Chittagong, Bangladesh
- Height: 1.79 m (5 ft 10 in)
- Batting: Left-handed
- Bowling: Right-arm medium fast
- Role: All-rounder

International information
- National side: Bangladesh (2017–present)
- ODI debut (cap 125): 17 October 2017 v South Africa
- Last ODI: 11 July 2026 v Zimbabwe
- ODI shirt no.: 74
- T20I debut (cap 56): 4 April 2017 v Sri Lanka
- Last T20I: 2 May 2026 v New Zealand
- T20I shirt no.: 74

Career statistics
Competition	ODI	T20I	FC	LA
Matches	30	51	37	146
Runs scored	362	304	1,306	1,822
Batting average	36.20	19.00	33.48	32.53
100s/50s	0/2	0/0	1/9	0/8
Top score	51*	39*	115*	68
Balls bowled	1,338	1,042	4,337	6,663
Wickets	42	57	63	227
Bowling average	31.19	26.08	38.22	25.45
5 wickets in innings	0	0	1	3
10 wickets in match	0	0	0	0
Best bowling	4/41	4/33	7/121	5/9
Catches/stumpings	5/–	13/–	20/–	44/–
- Source: ESPNcricinfo, 20 July 2026

Mohammad Saifuddin (Bengali: মোহাম্মদ সাইফুদ্দিন; born 1 November 1996) is a Bangladeshi professional cricketer. He is an all-rounder and currently plays for Bangladesh Premier League team Dhaka Capitals. In December 2015, he was named in Bangladesh's squad for the 2016 Under-19 Cricket World Cup. He made his international debut in October 2017.

== Domestic career ==
Saifuddin made his Twenty20 (T20) debut on 13 November 2016 playing for Comilla Victorians in the 2016–17 Bangladesh Premier League.

Saifuddin was the leading wicket-taker for Shinepukur Cricket Club in the 2017–18 Dhaka Premier Division Cricket League, with 14 dismissals in 10 matches.

In April 2018, Saifuddin scored his maiden century in first-class cricket, scoring 100 not out for East Zone in the final round of the 2017–18 Bangladesh Cricket League.

In October 2018, Saifuddin was named in the squad for the Comilla Victorians, following the draft for the 2018–19 Bangladesh Premier League. He was the leading wicket-taker for Abahani Limited in the 2018–19 Dhaka Premier Division Cricket League tournament, with 25 dismissals in 13 matches.

Saifuddin played for Minister Group Rajshahi in 2020-21 Bangabandhu T20 Cup.

== International career ==
In April 2017, Saifuddin was named in Bangladesh's Twenty20 International (T20I) squad for their series against Sri Lanka. He made his T20I debut for Bangladesh against Sri Lanka on 4 April 2017. In October 2017, he was named in Bangladesh's One Day International (ODI) squad for their series against South Africa. On 15 October 2017, he made his ODI debut against South Africa for Bangladesh at Kimberley.

In April 2019, Saifuddin was named in Bangladesh's squad for the 2019 Cricket World Cup. In September 2021, he was named in Bangladesh's squad for the 2021 ICC Men's T20 World Cup. However, on 26 October 2021, he was ruled out of the rest of the tournament, after suffering a back injury.
