= Mohimenul Khan =

Bangladeshi cricketer (born 1991)

Personal information
- Full name: Mohimenul Khan
- Born: 25 January 1991 (age 35)
- Source: Cricinfo, 13 April 2017

Mohimenul Khan (born 25 January 1991) is a Bangladeshi cricketer. He made his List A debut for Victoria Sporting Club in the 2016–17 Dhaka Premier Division Cricket League on 13 April 2017. He made his Twenty20 debut for Uttara Sporting Club in the 2018–19 Dhaka Premier Division Twenty20 Cricket League on 26 February 2019. He made his first-class debut for Rajshahi Division in the 2019–20 National Cricket League on 26 October 2019.
