= Sumon Khan =

Bangladeshi cricketer

Personal information
- Full name: Sumon Khan
- Born: 13 January 2000 (age 26); Manikganj, Bangladesh
- Height: 6 ft 1 in (185 cm)
- Batting: Left-handed
- Bowling: Right-arm medium
- Role: Bowler

International information
- National side: Bangladesh
- Only T20I (cap 86): 4 October 2023 v Malaysia

Domestic team information
- Years: Team
- 2018-present: Dhaka Division
- Cumilla Warriors
Medal record
Men's cricket
Representing Bangladesh
Asian Games
Bronze medal – third place	2022 Hangzhou	Team
South Asian Games
Gold medal – first place	2019 Kathmandu/Pokhara	Team
- Source: Cricinfo, 25 February 2019

Sumon Khan (born 13 January 2000) is a Bangladeshi cricketer. He made his first-class debut for Dhaka Division in the 2018–19 National Cricket League on 29 October 2018. He made his Twenty20 debut for Bangladesh Krira Shikkha Protishtan in the 2018–19 Dhaka Premier Division Twenty20 Cricket League on 25 February 2019. He made his List A debut for Bangladesh Krira Shikkha Protishtan in the 2018–19 Dhaka Premier Division Cricket League on 8 March 2019.

In November 2019, he was named in Bangladesh's squad for the 2019 ACC Emerging Teams Asia Cup in Bangladesh. He was the leading wicket-taker in the tournament, with fourteen dismissals in five matches. Later the same month, he was selected to play for the Cumilla Warriors in the 2019–20 Bangladesh Premier League, and he was named in Bangladesh's squad for the men's cricket tournament at the 2019 South Asian Games. The Bangladesh team won the gold medal, after they beat Sri Lanka by seven wickets in the final.

In February 2021, he was selected in the Bangladesh Emerging squad for their home series against the Ireland Wolves.
