= Anisul Islam Emon =

Bangladeshi cricketer (born 1997)

Personal information
- Full name: Mohammadd Anisul Islam Emon
- Born: 13 October 1997 (age 29); Narayanganj, Bangladesh
- Batting: Right-handed
- Bowling: Right-arm medium
- Role: Batting all-rounder

Domestic team information
- Years: Team
- 2021-present: Dhaka Metropolis

Career statistics
Competition	FC	LA	T20
Matches	14	55	39
Runs scored	762	1,620	749
Batting average	34.63	29.45	21.40
100s/50s	1/2	2/12	0/4
Top score	186	114	69
Balls bowled	534	580	214
Wickets	9	20	17
Bowling average	39.00	33.75	20.29
5 wickets in innings	0	0	1
10 wickets in match	0	0	0
Best bowling	3/10	3/15	5/23
Catches/stumpings	5/–	24/–	25/–
- Source: Cricinfo, 9 December 2025

Anisul Islam Emon (born 13 October 1997) is a Bangladeshi cricketer. He made his Twenty20 debut for Uttara Sporting Club in 2018–19 Dhaka Premier Division Twenty20 Cricket League on 26 February 2019. He made his List A debut for Uttara Sporting Club in the 2018–19 Dhaka Premier Division Cricket League on 8 March 2019. He was the leading run-scorer for Uttara Sporting Club in the 2018–19 Dhaka Premier Division Cricket League tournament, with 424 runs in 13 matches.

In February 2021, he was selected in the Bangladesh Emerging squad for their home series against the Ireland Wolves. He made his first-class debut for Dhaka Metropolis against Barisal Division in the 2020–21 National Cricket League on 22 March 2021.
