= Hamidul Islam (cricketer, born 1995) =

Bangladeshi cricketer (born 1995)

Personal information
- Full name: Hamidul Islam Shimul
- Born: 17 May 1995 (age 31); Nilphamari, Bangladesh
- Batting: Right handed
- Bowling: Right-arm medium
- Source: ESPNcricinfo, 24 February 2020

Hamidul Islam (born 17 May 1995) is a Bangladeshi cricketer. He made his List A debut for Shinepukur Cricket Club in a high-scoring defeat against Legends of Rupganj in the 2018–19 Dhaka Premier Division Cricket League on 11 March 2019. He made his Twenty20 debut also for Shinepukur Cricket Club in an easy win against Legends of Rupganj in the 2018–19 Dhaka Premier Division Twenty20 Cricket League on 25 February 2019.
