= Nahid Hasan (cricketer) =

Bangladeshi cricketer (born 1997)

Personal information
- Born: 21 May 1997 (age 29)
- Source: Cricinfo, 29 April 2017

Nahid Hasan (born 21 May 1997) is a Bangladeshi cricketer. He made his List A debut for Kala Bagan Krira Chakra in the 2016–17 Dhaka Premier Division Cricket League on 29 April 2017. He made his Twenty20 debut for Uttara Sporting Club in the 2018–19 Dhaka Premier Division Twenty20 Cricket League on 26 February 2019. He has represented Bangladesh U17 and Bangladesh U19 teams.
