= Aminul Islam (cricketer, born 1999) =

Bangladeshi cricketer

Personal information
- Full name: Aminul Islam Biplob
- Born: 6 November 1999 (age 27); Shariatpur, Bangladesh
- Nickname: Biplob
- Batting: Right-handed
- Bowling: Right arm leg break
- Role: All-rounder

International information
- National side: Bangladesh (2019– present)
- T20I debut (cap 65): 18 September 2019 v Zimbabwe
- Last T20I: 22 November 2021 v Pakistan

Career statistics
Competition	T20I	FC	LA	T20
Matches	10	27	74	36
Runs scored	35	957	1,629	126
Batting average	11.66	23.92	29.61	10.50
100s/50s	0/0	0/7	0/12	0/0
Top score	9	82	90*	34*
Balls bowled	188	1,342	1,084	514
Wickets	12	17	33	28
Bowling average	19.83	58.76	32.24	22.96
5 wickets in innings	0	0	0	0
10 wickets in match	0	0	1	0
Best bowling	3/34	3/56	5/48	3/34
Catches/stumpings	1/0	15/0	22/0	10/0
- Source: Cricinfo, 4 June 2026

Aminul Islam Biplob (born 6 November 1999) is a Bangladeshi cricketer. He made his international debut for the Bangladesh cricket team in September 2019.

== Domestic career ==
Aminul Islam made his List A debut for Mohammedan Sporting Club in the 2017–18 Dhaka Premier Division Cricket League on 11 February 2018. Prior to his List A debut, he was part of Bangladesh's squad for the 2018 Under-19 Cricket World Cup. He made his Twenty20 debut for Bangladesh Krira Shikkha Protishtan in the 2018–19 Dhaka Premier Division Twenty20 Cricket League on 25 February 2019.

Aminul Islam was the leading run-scorer for Bangladesh Krira Shikkha Protishtan in the 2018–19 Dhaka Premier Division Cricket League tournament, with 440 runs in 13 matches. In August 2019, he was one of 35 cricketers named in a training camp ahead of Bangladesh's 2019–20 season. He made his first-class debut on 17 October 2019, for Dhaka Metropolis in the 2019–20 National Cricket League. In November 2019, he was selected to play for the Khulna Tigers in the 2019–20 Bangladesh Premier League.

== International career ==
In September 2019, Aminul Islam received his maiden call up for national team, when he was added to the squad for last two Twenty20 Internationals (T20Is) in the 2019–20 Bangladesh Tri-Nation Series. He made his T20I debut for Bangladesh, against Zimbabwe, on 18 September 2019.

In November 2019, Aminul Islam was named in Bangladesh's squad for the 2019 ACC Emerging Teams Asia Cup in Bangladesh. In February 2021, he was selected in the Bangladesh Emerging squad for their home series against the Ireland Wolves. In September 2021, he was named as one of the two reserve players in Bangladesh's squad for the 2021 ICC Men's T20 World Cup. However, on 10 October 2021, he withdrew himself from the squad and returned home.
