= Mukidul Islam =

Bangladeshi cricketer (born 2000)

Personal information
- Full name: Mukidul Islam Mugdho
- Born: 30 June 2000 (age 26); Rangpur, Bangladesh
- Batting: Right handed
- Bowling: Right-arm medium fast
- Role: Bowler
- Source: ESPNcricinfo, 1 December 2025

Mukidul Islam (born 30 June 2000) is a Bangladeshi cricketer. He made his Twenty20 debut for Bangladesh Krira Shikkha Protishtan in the 2018–19 Dhaka Premier Division Twenty20 Cricket League on 25 February 2019. He made his List A debut for Bangladesh Krira Shikkha Protishtan in the 2018–19 Dhaka Premier Division Cricket League on 12 March 2019. He made his first-class debut for Rangpur Division in the 2019–20 National Cricket League on 26 October 2019.

In February 2021, he was selected in the Bangladesh Emerging squad for their home series against the Ireland Wolves. In April 2021, he was named in Bangladesh's preliminary Test squad for their series against Sri Lanka.
