= Rakibul Hasan (cricketer, born 2002) =

Bangladeshi cricketer

Personal information
- Born: 9 September 2002 (age 24); Mymensingh, Bangladesh
- Batting: Left-handed
- Bowling: Slow left-arm orthodox
- Role: Bowler

International information
- National side: Bangladesh
- T20I debut (cap 84): 4 October 2023 v Malaysia
- Last T20I: 7 October 2023 v Pakistan

Career statistics
Competition	T20I	FC	LA	T20
Matches	3	19	68	64
Runs scored	18	342	204	132
Batting average	18.00	16.28	12.75	7.76
100s/50s	0/0	0/1	0/0	0/0
Top score	14	63	40	20
Balls bowled	42	3,534	3,432	1,216
Wickets	2	68	107	61
Bowling average	27.50	26.07	21.48	23.18
5 wickets in innings	0	3	0	0
10 wickets in match	0	0	0	0
Best bowling	1/12	9/168	4/16	3/26
Catches/stumpings	2/–	7/-	27/–	25/–
Medal record
Men's cricket
Representing Bangladesh
ICC U-19 World Cup
Winner	2020 South Africa
Asian Games
Bronze medal – third place	2022 Hangzhou	Team
- Source: Cricinfo, 4 November 2025

Rakibul Hasan (born 9 September 2002) is a Bangladeshi cricketer. He made his List A debut for Shinepukur Cricket Club in the 2018–19 Dhaka Premier Division Cricket League on 23 March 2019.

In December 2019, he was named in Bangladesh's squad for the 2020 Under-19 Cricket World Cup. On 21 January 2020, in Bangladesh's match against Scotland, he took a hat-trick. He made his Twenty20 debut on 6 December 2020, for Gazi Group Chattogram in the 2020–21 Bangabandhu T20 Cup.

In February 2021, he was selected in the Bangladesh Emerging squad for their home series against the Ireland Wolves. He made his first-class debut for Dhaka Metropolis in the 2020–21 National Cricket League on 22 March 2021. In December 2021, he was named as the captain of Bangladesh's team for the 2022 ICC Under-19 Cricket World Cup, held in the West Indies in January and February 2022.
