= Mehedi Hasan (cricketer, born 2002) =

Bangladeshi cricketer (born 2002)

Personal information
- Born: 20 January 2002 (age 24)
- Source: Cricinfo, 25 February 2019

Mehedi Hasan (born 20 January 2002) is a Bangladeshi cricketer. He made his Twenty20 debut for Brothers Union in the 2018–19 Dhaka Premier Division Twenty20 Cricket League on 25 February 2019. He made his List A debut for Brothers Union in the 2018–19 Dhaka Premier Division Cricket League on 8 March 2019. He made his first-class debut on 10 October 2019, for Chittagong Division against Dhaka Metropolis in the 2019–20 National Cricket League.
