= Akbar Ali (cricketer) =

Bangladeshi cricketer (born 2001)

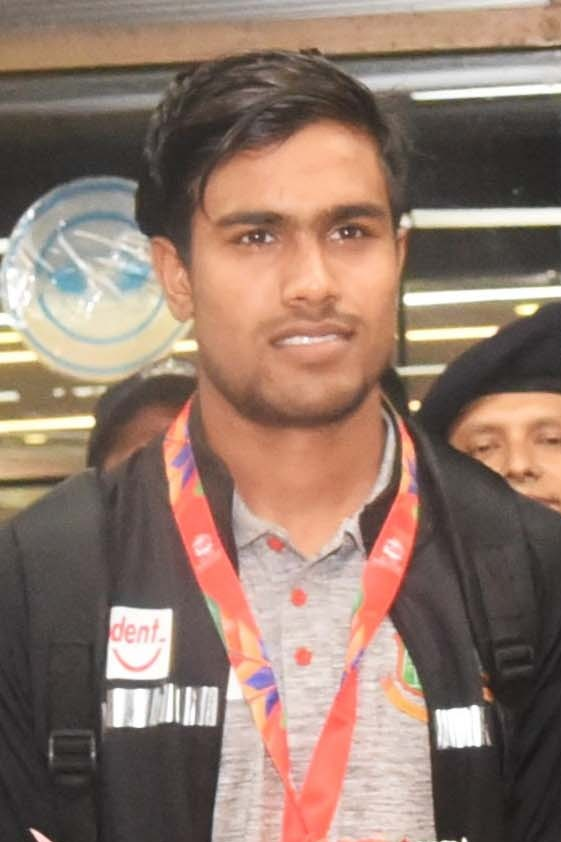
- Ali in 2020

Personal information
- Born: 8 October 2001 (age 25); Rangpur, Bangladesh
- Batting: Right-handed
- Role: Wicket-keeper

Career statistics
Competition	FC	LA	T20
Matches	27	94	86
Runs scored	1,240	1,983	1,180
Batting average	31.00	29.16	22.69
100s/50s	2/5	1/13	0/2
Top score	179	111	68*
Catches/stumpings	68/6	84/27	55/12
Medal record
Men's Cricket
Representing Bangladesh
ICC U-19 World Cup
Winner	2020 South Africa
- Source: Cricinfo, 26 February 2026

Akbar Ali (born 8 October 2001) is a Bangladeshi cricketer. He was referred as "Akbar the Great" after Bangladesh's victory in 2020 Under-19 Cricket World Cup under his captaincy and for his unbeaten knock in the final.

== Career ==
Akbar made his Twenty20 debut for Bangladesh Krira Shikkha Protishtan in the 2018–19 Dhaka Premier Division Twenty20 Cricket League on 25 February 2019. He made his List A debut for Bangladesh Krira Shikkha Protishtan in the 2018–19 Dhaka Premier Division Cricket League on 8 March 2019.

In December 2019, Akbar was named the captain of Bangladesh's squad for the 2020 Under-19 Cricket World Cup. Under his captaincy, Bangladesh won the Under-19 Cricket World Cup, the first ever major ICC event title for Bangladesh. In the final, they defeated India by three wickets, via the DLS method.

In February 2021, Akbar was selected in the Bangladesh Emerging squad for their home series against the Ireland Wolves. Akbar made his first-class debut on 26 February 2021, for the Bangladesh Emerging team against Ireland Wolves.

In November 2021, he was named in Bangladesh's Twenty20 International (T20I) squad for their series against Pakistan.
