= Shakhir Hossain =

Bangladeshi cricketer (born 1997)

Personal information
- Full name: Shakhir Hossain Shuvro
- Born: 20 October 1997 (age 29)
- Nickname: Shuvro
- Batting: Right-handed
- Role: Wicket-keeper
- Source: Cricinfo, 11 August 2021

Shakhir Hossain (born 20 October 1997) is a Bangladeshi cricketer, who plays as a wicketkeeper-batsman. He made his Twenty20 debut for Uttara Sporting Club in the 2018–19 Dhaka Premier Division Twenty20 Cricket League on 26 February 2019.
