= Delwar Hossain (cricketer) =

Bangladeshi cricketer (born 1985)

Personal information
- Full name: Delwar Hossain
- Born: 1 January 1985 (age 41); Rajshahi, Bangladesh
- Batting: Right-handed
- Bowling: Right-arm medium

Domestic team information
- Years: Team
- 2006/07–2010/11: Rajshahi Division

Career statistics
Competition	FC	List A
Matches	47	88
Runs scored	842	645
Batting average	17.54	16.97
100s/50s	–/4	3/–
Top score	82*	41*
Balls bowled	6207	3704
Wickets	128	125
Bowling average	25.01	22.07
5 wickets in innings	5	3
10 wickets in match	1	–
Best bowling	6/23	5/26
Catches/stumpings	–/–	6/–
- Source: ESPNcricinfo, 11 August 2021

Delwar Hossain (born 1 January 1985) is a first-class and List A cricketer from Bangladesh. He made his debut for Rajshahi Division in 2006/07, scoring an unbeaten 51 on his first-class debut against Barisal Division, and got figures of 3–46 in the one day clash against Dhaka Division.

He was the joint-leading wicket-taker for Prime Bank Cricket Club in the 2017–18 Dhaka Premier Division Cricket League, with 17 dismissals in 8 matches. He was also the leading wicket-taker for Shinepukur Cricket Club in the 2018–19 Dhaka Premier Division Cricket League tournament, with 19 dismissals in 10 matches. In November 2019, he was selected to play for the Sylhet Thunder in the 2019–20 Bangladesh Premier League.
