= Mosaddek Iftekhar =

Bangladeshi cricketer (born 1989)

Personal information
- Born: 26 December 1989 (age 36)
- Source: Cricinfo, 26 February 2019

Mosaddek Iftekhar (born 26 December 1989) is a Bangladeshi cricketer. He made his Twenty20 debut for Khelaghar Samaj Kallyan Samity in the 2018–19 Dhaka Premier Division Twenty20 Cricket League on 26 February 2019, which remains his only T20 outing.
