= Touhid Tareq =

Bangladeshi cricketer (born 1995)

Personal information
- Born: 17 January 1995 (age 31)
- Source: ESPNcricinfo, 25 September 2016

Touhid Tareq (born 17 January 1995) is a Bangladeshi cricketer who plays for Rajshahi Division. A left-hand batsman and right-arm off-break bowler, Tareq made his List A debut for Shinepukur Cricket Club in the 2017–18 Dhaka Premier Division Cricket League on 9 February 2018. He made his Twenty20 debut for Gazi Group Cricketers in the 2018–19 Dhaka Premier Division Twenty20 Cricket League on 26 February 2019.

== See also ==
- List of Rajshahi Division cricketers
