= Saqlain Sajib =

Bangladeshi cricketer (born 1988)

Personal information
- Born: 1 December 1988 (age 37); Rajshahi, Bangladesh
- Batting: Right handed
- Bowling: Slow Left Arm Orthodox Spin
- Role: Bowler

International information
- National side: Bangladesh (2016)
- Only T20I (cap 55): 21 March 2016 v Australia

Domestic team information
- Years: Team
- 2012–2013: Duronto Rajshahi
- 2016, 2017-present: Chittagong Vikings, Dhaka Dynamites
- Source: Cricinfo, 19 March 2016

Saqlain Sajib (born 1 December 1988) is a first-class and List A cricketer from Bangladesh. He made his debut for Rajshahi Division in 2006/07, making 17 against Chittagong Division on his first-class debut and proving potent with the ball in the one day arena, taking a best of 2 for 26 against Khulna Division. He made his international debut for the Bangladesh cricket team in March 2016.

== International career ==
In 2016, Sajib was added to Bangladesh's squad for the 2016 ICC World Twenty20 after Arafat Sunny was suspended for an illegal bowling action. He made his Twenty20 International (T20I) debut on 21 March 2016 against Australia in the 2016 ICC World Twenty20 tournament which has been his only international match till date.
