= Jahurul Islam (cricketer) =

Bangladeshi cricketer (born 1986)

Jahurul Islam Omi
Personal information
- Full name: Mohammad Jahurul Islam
- Born: 12 December 1986 (age 39); Rajshahi, Bangladesh
- Nickname: Aumi
- Height: 6 ft 0 in (1.83 m)
- Batting: Right-handed
- Bowling: Right-arm off break
- Role: Occasional wicket-keeper

International information
- National side: Bangladesh (2010–2013)
- Test debut (cap 58): 20 March 2010 v England
- Last Test: 25 April 2013 v Zimbabwe
- ODI debut (cap 98): 21 July 2010 v Australia
- Last ODI: 8 May 2013 v Zimbabwe
- T20I debut (cap 28): 5 May 2010 v Australia
- Last T20I: 31 March 2013 v Sri Lanka

Domestic team information
- Years: Team
- 2003-2022: Rajshahi Division
- 2019: Khulna Titans

Career statistics
Competition	Test	ODI	FC	LA
Matches	7	14	150	174
Runs scored	347	270	8,571	4,488
Batting average	26.69	22.50	36.62	28.05
100s/50s	0/0	0/1	18/46	5/31
Top score	48	53	177	130
Balls bowled	0	–	25	3
Wickets	–	–	1	0
Bowling average	–	–	19.00	–
5 wickets in innings	–	–	0	–
10 wickets in match	–	–	0	–
Best bowling	–	–	1/0	–
Catches/stumpings	7/–	7/–	152/9	92/17
Medal record
Men's Cricket
Representing Bangladesh
ACC Asia Cup
Runner-up	2012 Bangladesh
- Source: ESPNcricinfo, 24 December 2025

Mohammad Jahurul Islam Omi (Bengali: মোহম্মাদ জহুরুল ইসলাম, born 12 December 1986) is a Bangladeshi international cricketer. He played Test, One Day International and Twenty20 International cricket for Bangladesh between 2010 and 2013.

== Career ==
Jahurul Islam made his debut for Rajshahi Division in 2002/03 playing through the 2006/07 season. He also played for Bangladesh A in 2004, scoring 87 against England A. A right-handed batsman and occasional off-break bowler and wicket keeper. He is sometimes referred to on scoresheets by his nickname Aumi. He has scored two first-class centuries for his state, with a best of 139 against Barisal Division. He scored 71 against Dhaka Division in the one day game.

He was the leading run-scorer for Gazi Group Cricketers in the 2017–18 Dhaka Premier Division Cricket League, with 401 runs in 14 matches.

In October 2018, he was named in the squad for the Khulna Titans team, following the draft for the 2018–19 Bangladesh Premier League. He was the leading run-scorer for Abahani Limited in the 2018–19 Dhaka Premier Division Cricket League tournament, with 735 runs in 16 matches. In August 2019, he was one of 35 cricketers named in a training camp ahead of Bangladesh's 2019–20 season. In November 2019, he was selected to play for the Rangpur Rangers in the 2019–20 Bangladesh Premier League.
