= Farhad Reza =

Bangladeshi cricketer (born 1986)

Personal information
- Full name: Farhad Reza
- Born: 16 June 1986 (age 40); Rajshahi, Bangladesh
- Height: 5 ft 8 in (1.73 m)
- Batting: Right-handed
- Bowling: Right-arm fast-medium
- Role: All-rounder

International information
- National side: Bangladesh
- ODI debut (cap 80): 30 July 2006 v Zimbabwe
- Last ODI: 6 December 2011 v Pakistan
- T20I debut (cap 3): 28 November 2006 v Zimbabwe
- Last T20I: 20 March 2014 v Hong Kong

Domestic team information
- Years: Team
- 2004/05–present: Rajshahi Division
- 2008: Dhaka Warriors
- 2023: Chattogram Challengers
- Source: ESPNcricinfo, 14 February 2014

Farhad Reza (Bengali: ফরহাদ রেজা; born 16 June 1986) is a Bangladeshi cricketer who made his One Day International (ODI) debut against Zimbabwe in July 2006 and is the first batsman from Bangladesh to score a half century on ODI debut. He is a right-handed middle order batsman and right arm fast-medium pace bowler and played domestic cricket for Rajshahi Division from 2004 until 2008. Initially, Reza was not being picked for the national side by the selectors and Bashar insisted during the tournament that he could have used him. Finally, he was picked after an injury to Tapash Baisya during the Super Eight stage. Reza retired from international and domestic cricket in September 2008, aged 22, to play in the Indian Cricket League (ICL). He represents the Dhaka Warriors, a team in the ICL made up solely of Bangladeshi players.

== Domestic career ==
He was the leading wicket-taker in the 2018–19 Dhaka Premier Division Cricket League tournament, with 38 dismissals in 16 matches. In August 2019, he was one of 35 cricketers named in a training camp ahead of Bangladesh's 2019–20 season. In November 2019, he was selected to play for the Rajshahi Royals in the 2019–20 Bangladesh Premier League.

== International introduction ==
In July 2006, following a successful 2005/06 domestic season when Reza was leading run-scorer in the Bangladesh domestic league, he was selected in the 15-man squad to tour Zimbabwe and Kenya. The then chief selector described Reza and Shakib Al Hasan, who was also chosen in the squad, as "very good cricketers in all departments of the game. We have high hopes from them and it's time for them to perform at the international level". He made his One Day International (ODI) debut on 30 July 2006 against Zimbabwe in the second ODI of a five-match series. Coming in when the score was 73/4, Reza scored 50 from 57 balls, guiding the team score to 147/6. He was bowled by Ed Rainsford and finished with bowling figures of 10–0–43–0. Bangladesh won the match by 62 runs. Zimbabwe went on to win the series 3–2, denying Bangladesh their first away-series win. Reza played in the last four matches of the series, averaging 31.66 with the bat and 60.50 with the ball. His first ODI wicket was that of Hamilton Masakadza in the third ODI.

Bangladesh progressed onto Kenya, where they won the three match ODI series 3–0. It was their first away-series victory, and in the final ODI, Reza scored an unbeaten 41 to guide the team to victory. With 90 runs from three innings, Reza was Bangladesh's leading run-scorer in the series. After a promising start to his international career, Reza was awarded a central contract on 23 September 2006. In March 2008, Ireland toured Bangladesh for a series of three ODIs. During the second match Reza took his maiden international five-wicket haul and in the process helped his side to victory.

== Indian Cricket League ==
In September 2008, Reza, along with five other Bangladesh players, informed the Bangladesh Cricket Board (BCB) of his intention to retire from international and domestic cricket at the age of just 22. Reza and the others who decided to retire were summoned by the BCB to explain their decision, however they did not turn up to the meeting. Reza and 12 other Bangladeshi cricketers joined the Indian Cricket League (ICL), a Twenty20 competition not authorised by the International Cricket Council; they joined the new franchise, the Dhaka Warriors, led by former Bangladesh captain Habibul Bashar. It was only the second team in the tournament to feature only players from one country. On 17 September 2008, the BCB announced that the 13 Bangladesh cricketers who had joined the ICL were banned for 10 years. However, in June 2009, the players, including Reza, cut ties with the league; on 31 December the players became eligible for national selection.

Reza returned to play domestic cricket for Rajashi Division, and scored 234 runs and eight wickets in seven first-class matches for the team. On 25 November 2011, he was recalled to the Bangladesh ODI and T20 squad for their home series against Pakistan for the first time in 3 years.
