= Farhad Hossain (cricketer) =

Bangladeshi cricketer (born 1987)

Personal information
- Born: 10 February 1987 (age 39); Rajshahi, Bangladesh
- Batting: Right-handed
- Bowling: Right-arm off break
- Role: All-rounder

Domestic team information
- Years: Team
- 2004/05–2016/17: Rajshahi Division
- 2009/10: Khulna Division
- 2011/12: Barisal Burners
- 2012/13: Duronto Rajshahi
- FC debut: 12 March 2005 Rajshahi v Barisal
- Last FC: 8 October 2016 Rajshahi v Rangpur
- LA debut: 27 March 2005 Rajshahi v Chittagong
- Last LA: 19 January 2016 Gazi Group v Prime Doleshwar Sporting Club

Career statistics
Competition	FC	LA	T20
Matches	109	61	24
Runs scored	6,349	1,208	218
Batting average	36.07	22.79	19.81
100s/50s	12/27	0/5	0/0
Top score	216	89*	41*
Balls bowled	7,825	898	216
Wickets	161	30	9
Bowling average	25.14	22.20	27.11
5 wickets in innings	3	1	0
10 wickets in match	0	0	0
Best bowling	6/143	5/16	3/11
Catches/stumpings	139/–	25/–	7/–
- Source: ESPNcricinfo, 2 November 2016

Farhad Hossain (Bengali: ফরহাদ হোসেন; born 10 February 1987) is a first-class and List A former cricketer from Bangladesh.

He made his debut for Rajshahi Division in the 2004–05 season. Up to the end of the 2006–07 season he had scored 903 first-class runs at an average of 27.36 with five half centuries and a top score of 79 against Barisal Division. He had taken 25 wickets with his off breaks at an average of 22.92 with a best of 4 for 50 against Chittagong Division. In the one day arena, his unbeaten 89 against Sylhet Division is his highest score to date while he took 4 for 22 against Dhaka Division.

He played for Barisal Burners in the Bangladesh Premier League 2012. He retired from first-class cricket in November 2024.
