= Bangladesh Krira Shikkha Protishtan cricket team =

Cricket team in Bangladesh

Bangladesh Krira Shikkha Protishtan
Personnel
- Captain: Akbar Ali

Team information
- Founded: 1989

Bangladesh Krira Shikkha Protishtan cricket team, which represents the national sports academy, Bangladesh Krira Shikkha Protishtan, began playing List A cricket in Bangladesh in the 2018–19 Dhaka Premier Division Cricket League, and T20 cricket in the 2018–19 Dhaka Premier Division Twenty20 Cricket League. The team has played in various minor competitions in Bangladesh since the academy's founding in the 1980s.

In February 2019, they won their opening match in the 2018–19 Dhaka Premier Division Twenty20 Cricket League, beating Prime Doleshwar Sporting Club in a Super Over, after the game finished as a tie. In the 2018–19 Dhaka Premier Division Cricket League the team finished second from bottom in the table after the group stage fixtures, and therefore moved to the Relegation League playoffs section of the tournament. In the relegation playoffs, they finished in third place of the three teams, and were relegated to the First Division for the next season.
