= Uttara Sporting Club =

Cricket team

Personnel
- Captain: Shakhir Hossain
- Overseas player: Raza Ali Dar
- Overseas player: Manan Sharma

Uttara Sporting Club, sometimes Uttara Cricket Club, is a cricket team in Bangladesh, named after the suburb of Uttara in the north-west of Dhaka. It has been actively involved in local cricket activities and has produced talented cricketers over the years.

== History ==
Uttara Cricket Club played in the Dhaka First Division Cricket League in 2017.

They were one of the twelve teams to take part in the 2018–19 Dhaka Premier Division Twenty20 Cricket League and the 2018–19 Dhaka Premier Division Cricket League.

In February 2019, they won their opening fixture of the 2018–19 Dhaka Premier Division Twenty20 Cricket League, beating Khelaghar Samaj Kallyan Samity by six wickets. The following month, they won their opening match of the 2018–19 Dhaka Premier Division Cricket League, beating Sheikh Jamal Dhanmondi Club by 9 runs. However, following the conclusion of the group stage fixtures, the team finished bottom of the table, and therefore moved to the Relegation League playoffs section of the tournament. In the relegation playoffs, they placed second among the three teams, and were relegated to the sub-List-A First Division for the next season.

In 2024, Uttara Cricket Club played in 2023–24 Dhaka First Division Cricket League.

== List A record ==
- 2018-19: 13 matches, won 4, finished eleventh
