= 2025–26 National Cricket League Twenty20 =

- Dates: 14 September – 12 October 2025
- Administrator: Bangladesh Cricket Board
- Cricket format: Twenty20
- Tournament format(s): Round-robin and Playoffs
- Host: Bangladesh
- Champions: Rangpur Division (2nd title)
- Runners-up: Khulna Division
- Participants: 8
- Matches: 32
- Player of the series: Akbar Ali (Rangpur Division)
- Most runs: Mahmudul Hasan Joy (323) (Chittagong Division)
- Most wickets: Hasan Murad (14) (Chittagong Division)

The 2025–26 National Cricket League Twenty20 (NCL T20) was the third edition of the National Cricket League Twenty20, a Twenty20 cricket competition played in Bangladesh. The tournament took place from 14 September to 12 October 2025. Eight teams, including seven divisional teams and Dhaka Metropolis participated in the tournament.

The tournament was held in three venues across Sylhet, Rajshahi and Bogura, organized by the Bangladesh Cricket Board (BCB). The league was used as the pathway of selecting players for the players' draft of the 2026 Bangladesh Premier League, and finding local talents to nurture them. Rangpur Division are the reigning defending champions.

== Teams ==
The eight teams that took part in the tournament are listed below:

- Barisal Division
- Chittagong Division
- Dhaka Division
- Dhaka Metropolis
- Khulna Division
- Rajshahi Division
- Rangpur Division
- Sylhet Division

== Venues ==
The matches were played across these three venues:

Rajshahi	Bogura	Sylhet
Shaheed Qamaruzzaman Stadium	Shaheed Chandu Stadium	Sylhet International Cricket Stadium
Capacity: 15,000	Capacity: 18,000	Capacity: 18,500
		Sylhet International Cricket Stadium

Venues of NCL T20 2025

== Squads ==
Teams	Dhaka Division	Dhaka Metropolis	Chittagong Division	Rajshahi Division	Barisal Division	Khulna Division	Sylhet Division	Rangpur Division
Captains	Mahidul Islam Ankon	Naim Sheikh	Yasir Ali Chowdhury Rabby	Najmul Hossain Shanto	Sohag Gazi	Mohammad Mithun	Zakir Hasan	Akbar Ali
Players	Rony Talukdar; Jishan Alam; Ariful Islam; Mosaddek Hossain Saikat; Shuvagata Hom; Taibur Rahman; Mahfuzur Rahman Rabby; Sumon Khan; Ripon Mondol; Anamul Haque; Nazmul Islam Apu; Salauddin Sakil; Abdul Majid; Rayan Rafsan Rahman	Anisul Islam Emon; Shadman Islam; Marshall Ayub; Mahmudullah Riyad; Shamsur Rahman Shuvo; Tahjibul Islam; Aminul Islam Biplob; Rakibul Hasan; Arif Ahmed; Mahmudul Hasan; Abu Hider Rony; Maruf Mridha; Shohidul Islam; Mahfijul Islam	Sadiqur Rahman; Mahmudul Hasan Joy; Saikot Ali; Mominul Haque; Shahadat Hossain Dipu; Irfan Sukkur; Nayeem Hasan; Hasan Murad; Hasan Mahmud; Fahad Hossain; Mehedi Hasan Rana; MD Rubel; Ashraful Hasan Rohan; Ahmed Sharif	Habibur Rahman Sohan; Sabbir Hossain; Sabbir Rahman; Mehrob Hossain Ahin; Pritom Kumar; Shakhir Hossain Shuvro; Golam Kibria; Taijul Islam; Nihaduzzaman; Mohor Sheikh; Asaduzzaman Payel; Shafiqul Islam; Nahid Rana; Wasi Siddique	Rafsan Al Mahmud; Zahiduzzaman; Fazle Mahmud Rabbi; Salman Hossain; Moin Khan; Shamsul Islam Anik; Tanvir Islam; Yeasin Arafat; Ruyel Miah; Moinul Islam; Iftakhar Hossain Ifti; Sheikh Antor; Jehadul Hoque Jehad; Mehedi Hasan	Soumya Sarkar; Anamul Haque Bijoy; Imran Uzzaman; Afif Hossain; Tipu Sultan; Mehidy Hasan Miraz; Ziaur Rahman; Nahidul Islam; Mrittunjoy Chowdhury; Sheikh Parvez Jibon; Avishek Das Aronno; Jayed Ullah; Abdul Halim; Yaseen Muntasir	Amite Hasan; Mushfiqur Rahim; Asadulla Al Galib; Tawhidul Islam; Rahatul Ferdous; Nabil Samad; Abu Jayed Rahi; Rejaur Rahman Raja; Syed Khaled Ahmed; Mizanur Rahman Sayem; Mubin Ahmed Dishan; Naim Hossain Sakib; Shahanur Hossain Chowdhury	Mim Mosaddeak; Tanbir Hayder; Nasir Hossain; Naeem Islam; Jahid Javed; Musfik Hasan; Mukidul Islam Mugdho; Abdul Gaffar Saqlain; Alauddin Babu; Abdullah Al Mamun; Anik Sarker Shatu; Md. Abu Hasim; Anamul Hoque Anam; Rafiuzzaman Rafi

== Points table ==
Pos	Team	Pld	W	L	NR	Pts	NRR
1	Chittagong Division	7	5	1	1	11	1.657
2	Khulna Division	7	5	1	1	11	0.468
3	Dhaka Division	7	3	2	2	8	1.065
4	Rangpur Division	7	3	3	1	7	0.473
5	Dhaka Metropolis	7	3	3	1	7	−0.001
6	Rajshahi Division	7	2	3	2	6	−0.340
7	Sylhet Division	7	1	4	2	4	−1.708
8	Barisal Division	7	0	5	2	2	−2.226

Source: ESPNCricinfo

=== Match summary ===
Below is a summary of results for each team's seven regular season matches in chronological order. A team's opponent for any given match is listed above the margin of victory/defeat.

Team	League Stage							Play-offs				
Team	1	2	3	4	5	6	7	Q1	El	Q2	F	Pos.
Barisal (BAR)	Dhaka; N/R	Sylhet; 2 wickets	Rangpur; 6 wickets	Chittagong; 8 wickets	Khulna; 8 wickets	Dhaka-M; 96 runs	Rajshahi; N/R	❌				8th
Chittagong (CTG)	Khulna; N/R	Dhaka-M; 8 wickets	Rajshahi; 30 runs	Barisal; 8 wickets	Rangpur; 5 wickets	Sylhet; 99 runs	Dhaka; 5 wickets	-				-
Dhaka (DHK)	Barisal; N/R	Rangpur; 71 runs	Sylhet; 9 wickets	Rajshahi; 28 runs	Dhaka-M; N\R	Khulna; 17 runs	Chittagong; 5 wickets	-				-
Dhaka-M (DHM)	Rajshahi; 7 wickets	Chittagong; 8 wickets	Khulna; 22 runs	Sylhet; 23 runs	Dhaka; N/R	Barisal; 96	Rangpur; 3 wicket	❌				5th
Khulna (KHU)	TBD ?	TBD ?	TBD ?	TBD ?	TBD ?	TBD ?	TBD ?	-				-
Rajshahi (RAJ)	TBD ?	TBD ?	TBD ?	TBD ?	TBD ?	TBD ?	TBD ?	-				-
Rangpur (RNG)	TBD ?	TBD ?	TBD ?	TBD ?	TBD ?	TBD ?	TBD ?	-				-
Sylhet (SYL)	TBD ?	TBD ?	TBD ?	TBD ?	TBD ?	TBD ?	TBD ?	-				-

Team's results→	Won	Draw	Lost	N/R

== League stage ==
=== Round 1 ===
Match 1
14 September 2025
09:30
Scorecard

Rajshahi Division; 60/3 (5 overs)	v	Dhaka Metropolis; 61/3 (4.3 overs)

Dhaka Metropolis won by 7 wickets
Shaheed Qamaruzzaman Stadium, Rajshahi
Umpires: Mahfuzur Rahman and Morshed Ali Khan

- Dhaka Metropolis won the toss and elected to field.
- The match was reduced to 5 overs per side due to rain.

Match 2
14 September 2025
13:30
Scorecard

Sylhet Division	v	Rangpur Division

Match abandoned
Shaheed Chandu Stadium, Bogra
Umpires: Mozahiduzzaman and Tanvir Ahmed

- No toss.
- No play was possible due to rain.

Match 3
15 September 2025
10:00
Scorecard

Dhaka Division	v	Barisal Division

Match abandoned
Shaheed Chandu Stadium, Bogra
Umpires: Moniruzzaman and Morshed Ali Khan

- No toss.
- No play was possible due to rain.

Match 4
15 September 2025
14:00
Scorecard

Khulna Division	v	Chittagong Division

Match abandoned
Shaheed Qamaruzzaman Stadium, Rajshahi
Umpires: Mozahiduzzaman and Tanvir Ahmed

- No toss.
- No play was possible due to rain.

=== Round 2 ===
Match 5
26 September 2025
10:00
Scorecard

Khulna Division; 171/7 (20 overs)	v	Rajshahi Division; 172/2 (16.2 overs)

Rajshahi Division won by 8 wickets
Sylhet International Cricket Stadium, Sylhet
Umpires: Asadur Rahman and Barkatulylah Turkey

- Rajshahi Division won the toss and elected to field.

Match 6
26 September 2025
14:00
Scorecard

Dhaka Division; 171/3 (20 overs)	v	Rangpur Division; 100 (17.1 overs)

Dhaka Division won by 71 runs
Sylhet International Cricket Stadium, Sylhet
Umpires: Shafiuddin Ahmed and Shyful Islam

- Rangpur Division won the toss and elected to field.

Match 7
27 September 2025
09:30
Scorecard

Barisal Division; 141/8 (20 overs)	v	Sylhet Division; 143/8 (19.4 overs)

Sylhet Division won by 2 wickets
Sylhet International Cricket Stadium, Sylhet
Umpires: Barkatulylah Turkey and Muhammad Kamruzzaman

- Sylhet Division won the toss and elected to field.

Match 8
27 September 2025
13:30
Scorecard

Dhaka Metropolis; 185/6 (20 overs)	v	Chittagong Division; 186/2 (16.5 overs)

Chittagong won by 8 wickets
Sylhet International Cricket Stadium, Sylhet
Umpires: Ishtiaq Ahmed and Shyful Islam

- Dhaka Metropolis won the toss and elected to bat.

=== Round 3 ===
Match 9
28 September 2025
09:30
Scorecard

Khulna Division; 171/5 (20 overs)	v	Dhaka Metropolis; 149 (19.1 overs)

Khulna Division won by 22 runs
Sylhet International Cricket Stadium Academy Ground, Sylhet
Umpires: Asadur Rahman and Shafeen Shareef

- Dhaka Metropolis won the toss and elected to field.

Match 10
28 September 2025
13:30
Scorecard

Sylhet Division; 134/7 (20 overs)	v	Dhaka Division; 135/1 (17 overs)

Dhaka Division won by 9 wickets
Sylhet International Cricket Stadium Academy Ground, Sylhet
Umpires: Ishtiaq Ahmed and Shafiuddin Ahmed

- Sylhet Division won the toss and elected to bat.

Match 11
29 September 2025
09:30
Scorecard

Barisal Division; 106 (19.3 overs)	v	Rangpur Division; 109/4 (13.3 overs)

Rangpur Division won by 6 wickets
Sylhet International Cricket Stadium Academy Ground, Sylhet
Umpires: Habibur Rahman and Reazul Islam

- Rangpur Division won the toss and elected to field.

Match 12
29 September 2025
13:30
Scorecard

Chittagong Division; 155/6 (20 overs)	v	Rajshahi Division; 125/8 (20 overs)

Chittagong won by 30 runs
Sylhet International Cricket Stadium Academy Ground, Sylhet
Umpires: Nazmul Hasan and Sharfuddoula

- Rajshahi Division won the toss and elected to field.

=== Round 4 ===
Match 13
30 September 2025
10:00
Scorecard

Rajshahi Division	v	Dhaka Division

Sylhet International Cricket Stadium, Sylhet

Match 14
30 September 2025
14:00
Scorecard

Dhaka Metropolis	v	Sylhet Division

Sylhet International Cricket Stadium, Sylhet

Match 15
1 October 2025
10:00
Scorecard

Chittagong Division	v	Barisal Division

Sylhet International Cricket Stadium, Sylhet

Match 16
1 October 2025
14:00
Scorecard

Khulna Division	v	Rangpur Division

Sylhet International Cricket Stadium, Sylhet

=== Round 5 ===
Match 17
2 October 2025
10:00
Scorecard

Rajshahi Division	v	Sylhet Division

Sylhet International Cricket Stadium Academy Ground, Sylhet

Match 18
2 October 2025
14:00
Scorecard

Dhaka Metropolis	v	Dhaka Division

Sylhet International Cricket Stadium Academy Ground, Sylhet

Match 19
3 October 2025
10:00
Scorecard

Chittagong Division	v	Rangpur Division

Sylhet International Cricket Stadium Academy Ground, Sylhet

Match 20
3 October 2025
14:00
Scorecard

Khulna Division	v	Barisal Division

Sylhet International Cricket Stadium Academy Ground, Sylhet

=== Round 6 ===
Match 21
4 October 2025
10:00
Scorecard

Rangpur Division	v	Rajshahi Division

Sylhet International Cricket Stadium, Sylhet

Match 22
4 October 2025
14:00
Scorecard

Dhaka Metropolis	v	Barisal Division

Sylhet International Cricket Stadium, Sylhet

Match 23
5 October 2025
10:00
Scorecard

Chittagong Division	v	Sylhet Division

Sylhet International Cricket Stadium, Sylhet

Match 24
5 October 2025
14:00
Scorecard

Khulna Division	v	Dhaka Division

Sylhet International Cricket Stadium, Sylhet

=== Round 7 ===
Match 25
6 October 2025
10:00
Scorecard

Rajshahi Division	v	Barisal Division

Sylhet International Cricket Stadium Academy Ground, Sylhet

Match 26
6 October 2025
14:00
Scorecard

Dhaka Metropolis	v	Rangpur Division

Sylhet International Cricket Stadium Academy Ground, Sylhet

Match 27
7 October 2025
10:00
Scorecard

Chittagong Division	v	Dhaka Division

Sylhet International Cricket Stadium Academy Ground, Sylhet

Match 28
7 October 2025
14:00
Scorecard

Khulna Division	v	Sylhet Division

Sylhet International Cricket Stadium Academy Ground, Sylhet

== Play-offs ==
Qualifier 1
9 October 2025 — Sylhet
1
2
Eliminator
9 October 2025 — Sylhet
3
4

Qualifier 2
10 October 2025 — Sylhet
Q1L
EW

Final
12 October 2025 — Sylhet
Q1W
Q2W

=== Eliminator ===
Match 29
9 October 2025
11:30
Scorecard

3rd placed team	v	4th placed team

Sylhet International Cricket Stadium, Sylhet

=== Qualifier 1 ===
Match 30
9 October 2025
16:00 (D/N)
Scorecard

1st placed team	v	2nd placed team

Sylhet International Cricket Stadium, Sylhet

=== Qualifier 2 ===
Match 31
10 October 2025
17:00 (D/N)
Scorecard

TBD	v	TBD

Sylhet International Cricket Stadium, Sylhet

=== Final ===
Match 32
12 October 2025
17:00 (D/N)
Scorecard

Khulna Division; 136/8 (20 overs)	v	Rangpur Division; Rangpur Division (17 overs)

Rangpur Division Won
Sylhet International Cricket Stadium, Sylhet
Player of the match: Nasir Hossain
