= 2024–25 National Cricket League Twenty20 =

Cricket tournament

- Dates: 11 December 2024 – 24 December 2024
- Administrator: Bangladesh Cricket Board
- Cricket format: Twenty20
- Tournament format(s): Round-robin and Playoffs
- Host(s): Sylhet, Bangladesh
- Champions: Rangpur Division (1st title)
- Runners-up: Dhaka Metropolis
- Participants: 8
- Matches: 32
- Player of the series: Abu Hider (Dhaka Metropolis)
- Most runs: Mohammad Naim (316) (Dhaka Metropolis)
- Most wickets: Alauddin Babu (19) (Rangpur Division)

The 2024–25 National Cricket League Twenty20 (Bengali: ২০২৪–২৫ জাতীয় ক্রিকেট লিগ টি২০) also known as NCL T20 2024–25 or Al-Arafah Islami Bank presents National Cricket League Twenty20 2024–25 powered by Walton (for sponsorship reasons), was the second edition of the Twenty20 competition element of the National Cricket League (NCL). The tournament is organised by the Bangladesh Cricket Board (BCB). The eight teams representing seven of the divisions of Bangladesh and the metropolitan area of Dhaka. The tournament was played from 11 December 2024 to 24 December 2024.

The 2024–25 National Cricket League Twenty20 aims to foster the growth of domestic T20 cricket in Bangladesh, providing a platform for young and emerging cricketers to showcase their talent. The tournament, which follows a round-robin format leading to knockout stages, has drawn significant attention from local fans and stakeholders, looking forward to seeing future stars of Bangladesh cricket. In addition to its role in the national selection process, the NCL T20 has also garnered interest from various franchise leagues, positioning it as an essential part of the Bangladesh Cricket Board's (BCB) strategy to build a strong T20 ecosystem in the country. The competition is seen as a critical component in developing Bangladesh's readiness for international T20 tournaments such as the ICC Men's T20 World Cup.

== Teams ==
Eight teams were participated in the tournament. The teams are listed below.

1. Barisal Division
2. Chittagong Division
3. Dhaka Division
4. Dhaka Metropolis
5. Khulna Division
6. Rajshahi Division
7. Rangpur Division
8. Sylhet Division

== Venues ==
Locations of all stadiums which will host 2024 National Cricket League Twenty20

Sylhet	Sylhet
Sylhet International Cricket Stadium	Sylhet Outer Cricket Stadium
Capacity: 18,500	–
Sylhet International Cricket Stadium	
Matches: 18	Matches: 14

== Squads ==
Teams	Dhaka Division	Dhaka Metropolis	Chittagong Division	Rajshahi Division	Barisal Division	Khulna Division	Sylhet Division	Rangpur Division
Captains	Saif Hasan	Naim Sheikh	Yasir Ali	Najmul Hossain Shanto	Sohag Gazi	Nurul Hasan	Mahfuzur Rahman Rabbi	Akbar Ali
Players	Rony Talukder; Ashiqur Rahman Shibli; Mahidul Islam Ankon; Mosaddek Hossain; Ariful Islam; Shuvagata Hom; Taibur Rahman; Nazmul Islam Apu; Mehedi Hasan Shohag; Sumon Khan; Salauddin Sakil; Ripon Mondol; Anamul Haque; Jawad Abrar	Mahfijul Islam; Imran Uzzaman; Shamsur Rahman; Marshall Ayub; Al-Amin Jr.; Tahjibul Islam; Rakibul Hasan; Allis Al Islam; Arafat Sunny; Abu Hider Rony; Shohidul Islam; Maruf Mridha; Anisul Islam Emon; Aminul Islam Biplob	Tamim Iqbal; Mahmudul Hasan Joy; Sabbir Hossain; Shahadat Hossain Dipu; Irfan Sukkur; Sazzadul Haque Ripon; Mominul Haque; Naeem Hasan; Ifran Hossain; Fahad Hossain; Ahmed Sharif; Hasan Murad; Shamim Miya; Ashikur Rahman	Pritom Kumar; Sabbir Hossain; Habibur Rahman Sohan; Sabbir Rahman; Sakhir Hossain Shuvro; Golam Kibria Sakil; Farhad Reza; Nihaduzzaman; Wasi Siddique; Asaduzzaman Payel; Shafiqul Islam; Mohor Sheikh; Taijul Islam; SM Meherob Hasan; Mushfiqur Rahim; Towhid Hridoy	Iftekhar Hossain Ifti; Moinul Islam; Abdul Mazid; Fazle Mahmud; Salman Hossain Emon; Shamsul Islam Anik; Moin Khan; Tanvir Islam; Jehadul Haque Jehad; Kamrul Islam Rabbi; Ruyel Miah; Mehedi Hasan; Noor Mohammad; Ahrar Amin Pean	Anamul Haque; Imrul Kayes; Amit Majumder; Mohammad Mithun; Mehedi Hasan Rana; Ziaur Rahman; Nahidul Islam; Parvez Rahman Jibon; Mrittunjoy Chowdhury; Tipu Sultan; Masum Khan Tutul; Azizul Hakim Tamim; Al-Amin Hossain; Jayed Ullah	Zakir Hasan; Tawfique Khan Tushar; Amite Hasan; Wasif Akber; Tufayel Ahmed; Nabil Samad; Nayeem Ahmed; Naeem Hossain Sakib; Ebadot Hossain; Khaled Ahmed; Rejaur Rahman Raja; Abu Jayed Rahi; Jishan Alam; Asadulla Al Galib	Chowdhury Mohammad Rizwan; Mim Mosaddeak; Khaled Hasan; Naeem Islam; Abdullah Al Mamun; Tanbir Hayder; Ariful Haque; Alauddin Babu; Robiul Haque; Abu Hasem; Anamul Haque; Mukidul Islam; Abdul Gaffar Saklain; Arif Ahmed

.

== Points Table ==
Pos	Team	Pld	W	L	T	NR	Pts	NRR	Qualification
1	Dhaka Metropolis (R)	7	7	0	0	0	14	0.850	Qualifier 1
2	Rangpur Division (C)	7	5	2	0	0	10	0.408	Qualifier 1
3	Khulna Division (3rd)	7	4	3	0	0	8	0.249	Eliminator
4	Chittagong Division (4th)	7	3	4	0	0	6	0.220	Eliminator
5	Dhaka Division	7	3	4	0	0	6	−0.552	
6	Sylhet Division	7	2	5	0	0	4	−0.390	
7	Rajshahi Division	7	2	5	0	0	4	−0.391	
8	Barisal Division	7	2	5	0	0	4	−0.491	

Source: Cricheroes ESPNCricinfo

== Match Summary ==
Below is a summary of results for each team's seven regular season matches in chronological order. A team's opponent for any given match is listed above the margin of victory/defeat.

Team	League Stage							Play-offs				
Team	1	2	3	4	5	6	7	Q1	El	Q2	F	Pos.
Barisal (BAR)	DHM; 31 runs	KHU; 1 run	RAJ; 5 wickets	CTG; 5 wickets	RNG; 7 wickets	SYL; 2 wickets	DHK; 19 runs	Eliminated				8th
Chittagong (CTG)	RNG; 5 wickets	SYL; 12 runs	DHK; 10 wickets	BAR; 5 wickets	RAJ; 4 runs	KHU; 5 wickets	DHM; 17 runs	→	KHU; 7 runs	Eliminated		4th
Dhaka (DHK)	SYL; 6 wickets	RNG; 21 runs	CTG; 10 wickets	DHM; 19 runs	KHU; 21 runs	RAJ; 7 wickets	BAR; 19 runs	Eliminated				5th
Dhaka-M (DHM)	BAR; 31 runs	RAJ; 8 runs	KHU; 6 runs	DHK; 19 runs	SYL; 1 run	RNG; 7 wickets	CTG; 17 runs	RNG; 4 wickets	→	KHU; 38 runs	RNG; 5 wickets	2nd place, silver medalist(s)
Khulna (KHU)	RAJ; 11 runs	BAR; 1 run	DHM; 6 runs	SYL; 6 wickets	DHK; 21 runs	CTG; 5 wickets	RNG; 34 runs	→	CTG; 7 runs	DHM; 38 runs	Eliminated	3rd place, bronze medalist(s)
Rajshahi (RAJ)	KHU; 11 runs	DHM; 8 runs	BAR; 5 wickets	RNG; 7 wickets	CTG; 4 runs	DHK; 7 wickets	SYL; 26 runs	Eliminated				7th
Rangpur (RNG)	CTG; 5 wickets	DHK; 21 runs	SYL; 5 wickets	RAJ; 7 wickets	BAR; 7 wickets	DHM; 7 wickets	KHU; 34 runs	DHM; 4 wickets	→		DHM; 5 wickets	1st place, gold medalist(s)
Sylhet (SYL)	DHK; 6 wickets	CTG; 12 runs	RNG; 5 wickets	KHU; 6 wickets	DHM; 1 run	BAR; 2 wickets	RAJ; 26 runs	Eliminated				6th

Team's results→	Won	Draw	Lost	N/R

== League Stage ==
=== Round 1 ===
Match 1
11 December 2024
09:00
Scorecard

Dhaka Metropolis; 192/4 (20 overs)	v	Barisal Division; 161/8 (20 overs)
Naim Sheikh 65 (35); Mehedi Hasan 2/28 (4 overs)		Fazle Mahmud Rabbi 77 (52); Rakibul Hasan 3/26 (4 overs)

Dhaka Metropolis won by 31 runs
Sylhet Outer Cricket Stadium, Sylhet
Umpires: Amit Majumdar and Barkatullyah Turkey
Player of the match: Mohammad Naim (Dhaka Metropolis)

- Barisal Division won the toss and elected to field first
- Ahrar Amin, Moinul Islam and Nur Mohammad all made their T20 debuts.

Match 2
11 December 2024
09:30
Scorecard

Sylhet Division; 205/4 (20 overs)	v	Dhaka Division; 207/4 (20 overs)
Jishan Alam 100 (53); Nazmul Islam Apu 2/28 (4 overs)		Ariful Islam 94 (46); Khaled Ahmed 1/29 (4 overs)

Dhaka Division won by 6 wickets
Sylhet International Cricket Stadium, Sylhet
Umpires: Gazi Sohel and Kamruzzaman Limon
Player of the match: Ariful Islam (Dhaka Division)

- Dhaka Division won the toss and elected to field first
- Tufayel Ahmed, Wasif Akber, Asadullah Al Galib, Ashiqur Rahman and Ariful Islam all made their T20 debuts.
- Jishan Alam (Sylhet Division) scored his first century in T20s.

Match 3
11 December 2024
13:00
Scorecard

Khulna Division; 172/7 (20 overs)	v	Rajshahi Division; 153/3 (17.2 overs)
Azizul Hakim Tamim 53 (31); Farhad Reza 3/18 (4 overs)		Habibur Rahman 66 (38); Mrittunjoy Chowdhury 2/32 (3 overs)

Rajshahi Division won by 11 runs (DLS Method)
Sylhet Outer Cricket Stadium, Sylhet
Umpires: Tavir Ahmed and Shahin Al Asad
Player of the match: Habibur Rahman (Rajshahi Division)

- Khulna Division won the toss and elected to field.
- Azizul Hakim Tamim, Golam Kibria and Wasi Siddiquee all made their T20 debuts.

Match 4
11 December 2024
13:30
Scorecard

Chittagong Division; 132/9 (20 overs)	v	Rangpur Division; 134/5 (16.5 overs)
Mominul Haque 27 (21); Mukidul Islam Mugdho 3/17 (4 overs)		Tanvir Hayder 41 (37); Hasan Murad 2/26 (4 overs)

Rangpur Division won by 5 wickets
Sylhet International Cricket Stadium, Sylhet
Umpires: Ali Arman and Mahfuzur Rahman
Player of the match: Alauddin Babu (Rangpur Division)

- Rangpur Division won the toss and elected to field.
- Rizwan Chowdhury, Abdul Gaffar, Anamul Haque, Enamul Hoque and Ahmed Sharif all made their T20 debut.

=== Round 2 ===
Match 5
12 December 2024
09:00
Scorecard

Chittagong Division; 145/9 (15 overs)	v	Sylhet Division; 133 (14.2 overs)
Tamim Iqbal 65 (33); Khaled Ahmed 4/19 (3 overs)		Tawfiq Khan 76 (36); Nayeem Hasan 3/17 (3 overs)

Chittagong Division won by 12 runs
Sylhet Outer Cricket Stadium, Sylhet
Umpires: Mahfuzur Rahman and Moniruzzaman
Player of the match: Tamim Iqbal (Chittagong Division)

- Sylhet Division won the toss and elected to field.
- Nayeem Ahmed, Sabbir Hossen and Fahad Hossian all made their T20 debuts.
- Match was reduced to 15 overs as it was delayed due to fog.

Match 6
12 December 2024
09:30
Scorecard

Khulna Division; 130/9 (20 overs)	v	Barisal Division; 129/9 (20 overs)
Nurul Hasan 39 (35); Kamrul Islam Rabbi 4/23 (4 overs)		Abdul Mazid 51 (53); Nahidul Islam 2/11 (4 overs)

Khulna Division won by 1 run
Sylhet International Cricket Stadium, Sylhet
Umpires: Ishtiaq Ahmed and Morshed Ali Khan
Player of the match: Nurul Hasan (Khulna Division)

- Barishal Division won the toss and elected to field.
- Iftakhar Hossain Ifti made his T20 debut.

Match 7
12 December 2024
13:00
Scorecard

Rangpur Division; 140/5 (20 overs)	v	Dhaka Division; 112/9 (17 overs)
Ariful Haque 45 (39); Shuvagata Hom 1/1 (1 over)		Arafat Sunny 18 (18); Chowdhury Md Rizwan 4/21 (4 overs)

Rangpur Division won by 21 runs (DLS Method)
Sylhet Outer Cricket Stadium, Sylhet
Umpires: Shafeen Sharif and Tanvur Ahmed
Player of the match: Chowdhury Md Rizwan (Rangpur Division)

- Dhaka Division won the toss and elected to field.
- Iqbal Hossain Emon made his T20 debut.
- Match was reduced to 17 overs due to fog.

Match 8
12 December 2024
13:30
Scorecard

Dhaka Metropolis; 162 (19.5 overs)	v	Rajshahi Division; 154 (19.5 overs)
Naim Sheikh 43 (23); Mohor Sheikh 3/37 (3.5 overs)		Farhad Reza 60 (35); Shohidul Islam 4/26 (4 overs)

Dhaka Metropolis won by 8 runs
Sylhet International Cricket Stadium, Sylhet
Umpires: Gazi Sohel and Kamruzzaman Limon
Player of the match: Shohidul Islam (Dhaka Metropolis)

- Rajshahi Division won the toss and elected to field.
- Maruf Mridha made his T20 debut.

=== Round 3 ===
Match 9
14 December 2024
09:00
Scorecard

Dhaka Metropolis; 146/9 (18 overs)	v	Khulna Division; 140/8 (18 overs)
Imranuzzaman 46 (28); Mehedi Hasan Rana 3/25 (4 overs)		Azizul Hakim Tamim 29 (17); Aliss Al Islam 3/24 (4 overs)

Dhaka Metropolis won by 6 runs
Sylhet Outer Cricket Stadium, Sylhet
Umpires: Tanvir Ahmed and Rakibul Islam
Player of the match: Aliss Al Islam (Dhaka Metropolis)

- Khulna Division won the toss and elected to field first
- The match was reduced to 18 overs per side due to bad weather.

Match 10
14 December 2024
09:30
Scorecard

Dhaka Division; 64 (16.4 overs)	v	Chittagong Division; 65/0 (11 overs)
Taibur Rahman 30 (43); Fahad Hossain 4/11 (4 overs)		Mahmudul Hasan Joy 44* (37); Saif Hasan 0/3 (2 overs)

Chittagong Division won by 10 wickets
Sylhet International Cricket Stadium, Sylhet
Umpires: Moniruzzaman and Kamruzzaman Limon
Player of the match: Fahad Hossain (Chittagong Division)

- Chittagong Division won the toss and elected to field first

Match 11
14 December 2024
13:00
Scorecard

Rajshahi Division; 184/5 (20 overs)	v	Barisal Division; 188/5 (19.3 overs)
Najmul Hossain 80 (54); Moin Khan 2/22 (4 overs)		Fazle Mahmud 56 (34); Golam Kibria 1/31 (3.3 overs)

Barisal Division won by 5 wickets
Sylhet Outer Cricket Stadium, Sylhet
Umpires: Ali Arman and Amit Majumdar
Player of the match: Fazle Mahmud (Barisal Division)

- Barisal Division won the toss and elected to field first

Match 12
14 December 2024
13:30
Scorecard

Sylhet Division; 120/6 (20 overs)	v	Rangpur Division; 124/5 (15.4 overs)
Tofael Ahmed 51* (38); Mohammad Enamul 2/10 (3 overs)		Naeem Islam 50 (35); Ebadot Hossain 2/10 (3 overs)

Rangpur Division won by 5 wickets
Sylhet International Cricket Stadium, Sylhet
Umpires: Mahfuzur Rahman and Nazmul Hasan
Player of the match: Naeem Islam (Rangpur Division)

- Rangpur Division won the toss and elected to field first

=== Round 4 ===
Match 13
15 December 2024
09:00
Scorecard

Dhaka Metropolis; 190/7 (20 overs)	v	Dhaka Division; 171/8 (20 overs)
Naim Sheikh 69 (54); Nazmul Islam Apu 2/31 (4 overs)		Ariful Islam 42 (31); Anisul Islam Emon 4/38 (4 overs)

Dhaka Metropolis won by 19 runs
Sylhet Outer Cricket Stadium, Sylhet
Umpires: Mahfuzur Rahman and Barkatullah Turkey
Player of the match: Anisul Islam Emon (Dhaka Metropolis)

- Dhaka Division won the toss and elected to field first

Match 14
15 December 2024
09:30
Scorecard

Rangpur Division; 189/8 (20 overs)	v	Rajshahi Division; 194/3 (18 overs)
Sabbir Hossain 73* (52); Alauddin Babu 3/25 (4 overs)		Tanvir Haider 71 (45); Asaduzzaman Payel 1/37 (4 overs)

Rangpur Division won by 7 wickets
Sylhet International Cricket Stadium, Sylhet
Umpires: Kamruzzaman and Shahin Al Asad
Player of the match: Akbar Ali (Rangpur Division)

- Rangpur Division won the toss and elected to field first

Match 15
15 December 2024
13:00
Scorecard

Khulna Division; 147/7 (20 overs)	v	Sylhet Division; 150/4 (18.3 overs)
Nurul Hasan 48* (34); Nabil Samad 2/17 (4 overs)		Jishan Alam 73 (48); Jayed Ullah 1/20 (4 overs)

Sylhet Division won by 6 wickets
Sylhet Outer Cricket Stadium, Sylhet
Umpires: Moniruzzaman and Sajedul Islam
Player of the match: Jishan Alam (Sylhet Division)

- Khulna Division won the toss and elected to bat first

Match 16
15 December 2024
13:30
Scorecard

Chittagong Division; 182/7 (20 overs)	v	Barisal Division; 185/5 (20 overs)
Tamim Iqbal 91 (54); Mehedi Hasan 3/25 (4 overs)		Iftekhar Hossain Ifti 56 (39); Ahmed Sharif 2/27 (4 overs)

Barisal Division won by 5 wickets
Sylhet International Cricket Stadium, Sylhet
Umpires: Gazi Sohel.and Ishtiaq Ahmed
Player of the match: Salman Hossain Emon (Barisal Division)

- Chittagong Division won the toss and elected to bat first

=== Round 5 ===
Match 17
17 December 2024
09:00
Scorecard

Barisal Division; 108 (19.2 overs)	v	Rangpur Division; 109/3 (17.5 overs)
Iftakhar Hossain Ifti 25 (31); Alauddin Babu 4/9 (4 overs)		Chowdhury Md Rizwan 53 (44); Moin Khan 1/11 (3 overs)

Rangpur Division won by 7 wickets
Sylhet Outer Cricket Stadium, Sylhet
Umpires: Morshed Ali Khan and Rakibul Islam
Player of the match: Alauddin Babu (Rangpur Division)

- Rangpur Division won the toss and elected to field first

Match 18
17 December 2024
09:30
Scorecard

Khulna Division; 180/3 (20 overs)	v	Dhaka Division; 159/4 (20 overs)
Anamul Haque 101* (67); Nazmul Islam Apu 2/34 (4 overs)		Taibur Rahman 63* (41); Jayed Ullah 3/13 (4 overs)

Khulna Division won by 21 runs
Sylhet International Cricket Stadium, Sylhet
Umpires: Gazi Sohel and Shafeen Sharif
Player of the match: Anamul Haque (Khulna Division)

- Dhaka Division won the toss and elected to field first

Match 19
17 December 2024
13:00
Scorecard

Chittagong Division; 198/7 (20 overs)	v	Rajshahi Division; 194/7 (20 overs)
Irfan Sukkur 54 (29); Sabbir Hossain 3/21 (4 overs)		Towhid Hridoy 69 (50); Ahmed Sharif 3/38 (4 overs)

Chittagong Division won by 4 runs
Sylhet Outer Cricket Stadium, Sylhet
Umpires: Mahfuzur Rahman and Nazmul Hossain
Player of the match: Nayeem Hasan (Chittagong Division)

- Rajshahi Division won the toss and elected to field first

Match 20
17 December 2024
13:30
Scorecard

Dhaka Metropolis; 156/7 (20 overs)	v	Sylhet Division; 155/7 (20 overs)
Abu Hider 47* (23); Naim Hossain Sakib 3/29 (4 overs)		Mahfuzur Rahman Rabby 82* (39); Abu Hider 2/36 (4 overs)

Dhaka Metropolis won by 1 runs
Sylhet International Cricket Stadium, Sylhet
Umpires: Amit Majumdar and Tanvir Ahmed
Player of the match: Abu Hider (Dhaka Metropolis)

- Dhaka Metropolis won the toss and elected to bat first

=== Round 6 ===
Match 21
18 December 2024
09:00
Scorecard

Barisal Division; 108 (18.4 overs)	v	Sylhet Division; 109/8 (18.5 overs)
Iftakhar Hossain Ifti 26 (30); Tofael Ahmed 3/15 (4 overs)		Tawfique Khan 21 (13); Kamrul Islam Rabbi 3/23 (4 overs)

Sylhet Division won by 2 wickets
Sylhet Outer Cricket Stadium, Sylhet
Umpires: Ishtiaq Ahmed and Mohammad Kamruzzaman
Player of the match: Mahfuzur Rahman Rabby (Sylhet Division)

- Sylhet Division won the toss and elected to field first

Match 22
18 December 2024
09:30
Scorecard

Chittagong Division; 129/6 (20 overs)	v	Khulna Division; 132/5 (18.5 overs)
Yasir Ali 61 (39); Sheikh Parvez Jibon 2/18 (4 overs)		Ziaur Rahman Zia 39* (36); Nayeem Hasan 1/13 (4 overs)

Khulna Division won by 5 wickets
Sylhet International Cricket Stadium, Sylhet
Umpires: Ali Arman and Sajedul Islam
Player of the match: Ziaur Rahman Zia (Khulna Division)

- Khulna Division won the toss and elected to field first

Match 23
18 December 2024
13:00
Scorecard

Dhaka Division; 140 (19.1 overs)	v	Rajshahi Division; 143/3 (15.1 overs)
Towhid Hridoy 37 (26); Iqbal Hossain Emon 3/26 (4 overs)		Zawad Abrar 62 (39); Wasi Siddiquee 2/35 (4 overs)

Dhaka Division won by 7 wickets
Sylhet Outer Cricket Stadium, Sylhet
Umpires: Kamruzzaman Limon and Moniruzzaman
Player of the match: Zawad Abrar (Dhaka Division)

- Dhaka Division won the toss and elected to field first

Match 24
18 December 2024
13:30
Scorecard

Rangpur Division; 125 (19.3 overs)	v	Dhaka Metropolis; 126/3 (15.3 overs)
Alauddin Babu 47 (23); Abu Hider 3/7 (3 overs)		Shadman Islam 54 (37); Alauddin Babu 2/17 (2.3 overs)

Dhaka Metro won by 7 wickets
Sylhet International Cricket Stadium, Sylhet
Umpires: Shahin Al Asad and Mahfuzur Rahman
Player of the match: Abu Hider (Dhaka Metropolis)

- Dhaka Metropolis won the toss and elected to field first

=== Round 7 ===
Match 25
19 December 2024
09:00
Scorecard

Dhaka Metropolis; 158/8 (20 overs)	v	Chittagong Division; 141/9 (20 overs)
Shamsur Rahman 56 (48); Ahmed Sharif 3/39 (4 overs)		Yasir Ali 46 (31); Aminul Islam 2/12 (2 overs)

Dhaka Metropolis won by 17 runs
Sylhet Outer Cricket Stadium, Sylhet
Umpires: Mahfuzur Rahman and Amit Mojumder
Player of the match: Shamsur Rahman (Dhaka Metropolis)

- Chittagong Division won the toss and elected to field first

Match 26
19 December 2024
09:30
Scorecard

Rajshahi Division; 181/8 (20 overs)	v	Sylhet Division; 155/8 (20 overs)
Najmul Hossain 78 (48); Khaled Ahmed 3/24 (4 overs)		Jishan Alam 60 (32); Asaduzzaman Payel 4/24 (4 overs)

Rajshahi Division won by 26 runs
Sylhet International Cricket Stadium, Sylhet
Umpires: Tanvir Ahmed and Barkatulylah Turkey
Player of the match: Najmul Hossain (Rajshahi Division)

- Sylhet Division won the toss and elected to field first

Match 27
19 December 2024
13:00
Scorecard

Khulna Division; 195/4 (20 overs)	v	Rangpur Division; 161/9 (20 overs)
Mohammad Mithun 71 (49); Robiul Haque 2/31 (4 overs)		Akbar Ali 46 (31); Tipu Sultan 3/20 (2 overs)

Khulna Division won by 34 runs
Sylhet Outer Cricket Stadium, Sylhet
Umpires: Nazmul Hasan and Morshed Ali Khan
Player of the match: Mohammad Mithun (Khulna Division)

- Rangpur Division won the toss and elected to field first

Match 28
19 December 2024
13:30
Scorecard

Dhaka Division; 178 (20 overs)	v	Barisal Division; 159/6 (20 overs)
Sumon Khan 36* (21); Ruyel Miah 4/36 (3 overs)		Kamrul Islam Rabbi 39 (23); Saif Hassan 2/15 (3 overs)

Dhaka Division won by 19 runs
Sylhet International Cricket Stadium, Sylhet
Umpires: Shafeen Shareef and Gazi Sohel
Player of the match: Sumon Khan (Dhaka Division)

- Dhaka Division won the toss and elected to bat first

== Play-offs ==
Qualifier 1
21 December 2024 — Sylhet
1	Dhaka Metropolis	107/9 (20 overs)
2	Rangpur Division	108/6 (19.2 overs)
Eliminator
21 December 2024 — Sylhet
3	Khulna Division	146 (19.3 overs)
4	Chittagong Division	139/6 (20 overs)

Qualifier 2
22 December 2024 — Sylhet
Q1L	Dhaka Metropolis	119/8 (20 overs)
EW	Khulna Division	81 (17.4 overs)

Final
24 December 2024 — Sylhet
Q1W	Rangpur Division	65/5 (11.2 overs)
Q2W	Dhaka Metropolis	62 (16.3 overs)

=== Eliminator ===
Match 29
21 December 2024
09:30
Scorecard

Khulna Division; 146 (19.3 overs)	v	Chittagong Division; 139/6 (20 overs)
Nurul Hasan 52 (39); Ahmed Sharif 4/26 (4 overs)		Yasir Ali 37 (27); Mehedi Hasan Rana 2/12 (4 overs)

Khulna Division won by 7 runs
Sylhet International Cricket Stadium, Sylhet
Umpires: Mahfuzur Rahman and Gazi Sohel
Player of the match: Nurul Hasan (Khulna Division)

- Chittagong Division won the toss and elected to field first

=== Qualifier 1 ===
Match 30
21 December 2024
13:30
Scorecard

Dhaka Metropolis; 107/9 (20 overs)	v	Rangpur Division; 108/6 (19.2 overs)
Imran Uzzaman 30 (42); Robiul Haque 3/19 (4 overs)		Ariful Haque 22 (20); Shohidul Islam 2/25 (4 overs)

Rangpur Division won by 4 wickets
Sylhet International Cricket Stadium, Sylhet
Umpires: Morshed Ali Khan and Tanvir Ahmed
Player of the match: Robiul Haque (Rangpur Division)

- Dhaka Metropolis won the toss and elected to bat first

=== Qualifier 2 ===
Match 31
22 December 2024
12:30
Scorecard

Dhaka Metropolis; 119/8 (20 overs)	v	Khulna Division; 81 (17.4 overs)
Naim Sheikh 53 (38); Masum Khan Tutul 2/16 (4 overs)		Nurul Hasan 22 (18); Mosaddek Hossain 3/13 (2.3 overs)

Dhaka Metropolis won by 38 runs
Sylhet International Cricket Stadium, Sylhet
Umpires: Gazi Sohel and Tanvir Ahmed
Player of the match: Rakibul Hasan (Dhaka Metro)

- Dhaka Metropolis won the toss and elected to bat first

=== Final ===
Match 32
24 December 2024
12:30
Scorecard

Dhaka Metropolis; 62 (16.3 overs)	v	Rangpur Division; 65/5 (11.2 overs)
Shamsur Rahman 53 (38); Mukidul Islam 3/13 (4 overs)		Mohammad Enamul 14* (9); Abu Hider 2/8 (4 overs)

Rangpur Division won by 5 wickets
Sylhet International Cricket Stadium, Sylhet
Umpires: Gazi Sohel and Masudur Rahman
Player of the match: Mukidul Islam (Rangpur Division)

- Rangpur Division won the toss and elected to field first

== Statistics ==
Most runs
Player	Team	Runs
Mohammad Naim	Dhaka Metropolis	316
Jishan Alam	Sylhet Division	281
Nurul Hasan	Khulna Division	266
Habibur Rahman Sohan	Rajshahi Division	259
Azizul Hakim Tamim	Khulna Division	237

- Source: ESPNCricinfo

Most Wickets
Player	Team	Wickets
Alauddin Babu	Rangpur Division	19
Ahmed Sharif	Chittagong Division	17
Rakibul Hasan	Dhaka Metropolis	15
Aliss Al Islam	Dhaka Metropolis	14
Abu Hider	Dhaka Metropolis	13

- Source: ESPNCricinfo

Highest individual score
Player	Team	Score	Opponent	Date
Anamul Haque	Khulna Division	101*	Dhaka Division	17-12-24
Jishan Alam	Sylhet Division	100	Dhaka Division	11-12-24
Ariful Islam	Dhaka Division	94	Sylhet Division	11-12-24
Tamim Iqbal	Chittagong Division	91	Barisal Division	15-12-24
Mahfuzur Rahman Rabbi	Rajshahi Division	82*	Dhaka Metropolis	17-12-24

- Source: ESPNCricinfo

== Broadcast ==
Territory	Channels and streaming	Digital Streaming
Bangladesh	T Sports	T Sports app
India / Nepal		FanCode
Rest of the World		T Sports YouTube

- Source: BCB
