= 2025–26 National Cricket League =

Bangladeshi cricket tournament

- Dates: 25 October – 9 December 2025
- Administrator: BCB
- Cricket format: First-class cricket
- Tournament format: Round-robin
- Host: Bangladesh
- Champions: Rangpur Division (3rd title)
- Participants: 8
- Matches: 28
- Most runs: Soumya Sarkar (633)
- Most wickets: Tanvir Islam (34)
- Official website: NCL 2025–26

The 2025–26 National Cricket League was the 27th edition of the National Cricket League, a first-class cricket competition in Bangladesh. Mymensingh Division replaced Dhaka Metropolis team in this season. The all eight teams played every other team as like previous season. Sylhet Division was the previous season's champion. The tournament began on 25 October 2025 and ended on 9 December 2025. Rangpur Division won their 3rd title by defeating Khulna Division in the final round.

== Teams ==
Eight teams were participated in the tournament. The teams are listed below.

1. Barisal Division
2. Chattogram Division
3. Dhaka Division
4. Khulna Division
5. Mymensingh Division
6. Rajshahi Division
7. Rangpur Division
8. Sylhet Division

== Venues ==
Locations of all stadiums which have hosted 2025-26 National Cricket League

Bogra	Chittagong	Cox's Bazar	Dhaka
Shaheed Chandu Stadium	Bir Shrestho Flight Lieutenant Matiur Rahman Cricket Stadium	Cox's Bazar International Cricket Stadium	Sher-e-Bangla National Cricket Stadium
Capacity: 15,000	Capacity: 22,000	Capacity: 7,800	Capacity: 26,000
	Zahur Ahmed Chowdhury Stadium		Sher-e-Bangla National Cricket Stadium
Matches:	Matches:	Matches:	Matches:
Khulna	Rajshahi	Sylhet	Sylhet
Khulna Divisional Stadium	Rajshahi Divisional Stadium	Sylhet International Cricket Stadium	SICS Academy Ground
Capacity: 15,000	Capacity: 15,000	Capacity: 18,500	
	Shaheed Qamaruzzaman Stadium	Sylhet International Cricket Stadium	
Matches:	Matches:	Matches:	Matches:

== Squads ==
Barisal Division	Chattogram Division	Dhaka Division	Mymensingh Division
Adil Bin Siddique; Ifthekhar Hossain Ifti; Fazle Mahmud; Salman Hossain; Tasamul Haque; Shamsur Rahman; Moin Khan; Zahiduzzaman; Tanvir Islam (Captain); Ruyel Miah; Mishu; Mozammel Hasan; Tawhidul Islam; Shamsul Islam; Ovi Ahmed; Saiful Islam; Hafizur Rahman; Islamul Ahsan; Md. Abdullah	Sadiqur Rahman; Mahmudul Hasan Joy; Mominul Haque; Sajjadul Haque; Shahadat Hossain Dipu (C); Yasir Ali; Irfan Sukkur; Nayeem Hasan; Hasan Murad; Ashraful Alam Rohan; Ifran Hossain; Jasimuddin; Mehedi Hasan; Fahad Hossain; Enamul Haque; Ahmed Sharif; Md. Rubel; Omar Hasan; Shamim Miah; Zillur Rahman	Shadman Islam; Rony Talukdar; Jishan Alam; Anisul Islam Emon; Marshall Ayub; Mahidul Islam Ankon; Taibur Rahman; Ashiqur Rahman Shibli; Raihan Rafsan; Nazmul Islam; Mahfuzur Rahman Rabby; Ripon Mondol; Sumon Khan; Salauddin Sakil; Enamul Haque	Abu Hider; Mohammad Naim; Abdul Majid; Mahfijul Islam; Aich Molla; Ariful Islam; Al-Amin Hossain; Shuvagata Hom (Captain); Aminul Islam Biplob; Mohammad Tajibul; Rakibul Hasan; Arif Ahmed; Maruf Mridha; Shahidul Islam; Asadullah Galib; Shakil Hossain; Khalid Hasan; Fahim Hasan; Mosaddek Hossain

== Points table ==
Pos	Team	Pld	W	L	T	D	NR	Pts
1	Rangpur Division	7	3	1	0	3	0	31
2	Sylhet Division	7	2	0	0	5	0	28
3	Mymensingh Division	7	2	1	0	4	0	24
4	Khulna Division	7	2	2	0	3	0	22
5	Barishal Division	7	2	3	0	2	0	20
6	Chattogram Division	7	2	4	0	1	0	19
7	Dhaka Division	7	1	1	0	5	0	19
8	Rajshahi Division	7	2	4	0	1	0	18

Source: Cricinfo

== Fixtures ==
=== Round 1 ===
25–28 October 2025	Mymensingh Division	v	Sylhet Division	Match drawn
Match 1 Scorecard	401 (103.4 overs); Abu Hider 107* (105); Asadulla Al Galib 3/24 (6.4 overs)		489 (130.3 overs); Shykat Ali 175 (232); Rakibul Hasan 9/168 (55.3 overs)	Sylhet International Cricket Stadium, Sylhet; Umpires: Mahfuzur Rahman and Muhammad Kamruzzaman; Player of the match: Ariful Islam (Mymensingh Division)
Match 1 Scorecard	272/9 (87 overs); Ariful Islam 62 (158); Nabil Samad 4/135 (36 overs)			Sylhet International Cricket Stadium, Sylhet; Umpires: Mahfuzur Rahman and Muhammad Kamruzzaman; Player of the match: Ariful Islam (Mymensingh Division)
Sylhet Division won the toss and elected to field.; Points: Mynmensingh Division 2, Sylhet Division 2

25–28 October 2025	Dhaka Division	v	Rangpur Division	Match drawn
Match 2 Scorecard	221 (63.3 overs); Marshall Ayub 105 (161); Abu Hasim 3/47 (18 overs)		358 (114.3 overs); Naeem Islam 137 (269); Taibur Rahman 3/83 (33 overs)	Sylhet Outer Cricket Stadium, Sylhet; Umpires: Barkatulylah Turkey and Moniruzzaman; Player of the match: Abu Hasim (Rangpur Division)
Match 2 Scorecard	333 (113.3 overs); Jishan Alam 97 (158); Tanbir Hayder 4/43 (10 overs)		115/6 (26 overs); Alauddin Babu 38 (43); Taibur Rahman 2/21 (7 overs)	Sylhet Outer Cricket Stadium, Sylhet; Umpires: Barkatulylah Turkey and Moniruzzaman; Player of the match: Abu Hasim (Rangpur Division)
Rangpur Division won the toss and elected to field.; Points: Dhaka Division 2, Rangpur Division 2

25–28 October 2025	Khulna Division	v	Barishal Division	Khulna Division won by 7 wickets
Match 3 Scorecard	313 (86.1 overs); Sheikh Parvez Jibon 73 (98); Moin Khan 3/56 (19 overs)		126 (41.3 overs); Zahiduzzaman 57 (117); Afif Hossain 6/31 (10.5)	Khulna Divisional Stadium, Khulna; Umpires: Kamruzzaman Limon and Mozahiduzzaman; Player of the match: Afif Hossain (Khulna Division)
Match 3 Scorecard	38/3 (10.5 overs); Amit Majumder 22 (43); Shamsur Rahman 2/4 (1.5 overs)		224 (73.5 overs) (f/o); Shamsur Rahman 44 (78); Nahidul Islam 2/51 (20 overs)	Khulna Divisional Stadium, Khulna; Umpires: Kamruzzaman Limon and Mozahiduzzaman; Player of the match: Afif Hossain (Khulna Division)
Khulna Division won the toss and elected to bat.; Yasen Muntasir (Khulna Division) made his first-class debut.; Points: Khulna Division 8, Barishal Division 0

25–28 October 2025	Chattogram Division	v	Rajshahi Division	Chattogram Division won by 112 runs
Match 4 Scorecard	401 (82.3 ovrs); Yasir Ali 129 (138); Taijul Islam 4/159 (34 overs)		196 (54.4 overs); Sabbir Hossain 57 (81); Hasan Murad 6/39 (18.4 overs)	Shaheed Qamaruzzaman Stadium, Rajshahi; Umpires: Ali Arman and Sajedul Islam; Player of the match: Yasir Ali (Chattogram Division)
Match 4 Scorecard	277/9d (63.5 overs); Yasir Ali 92 (123); Shafiqul Islam 4/66 (18 overs)		370 (86.5 overs); Pritom Kumar 83 (143); Hasan Murad 3/96 (32.5 overs)	Shaheed Qamaruzzaman Stadium, Rajshahi; Umpires: Ali Arman and Sajedul Islam; Player of the match: Yasir Ali (Chattogram Division)
Rajshahi Division won the toss and elected to field.; Rahim Ahmed (Rajshahi Division) made his first-class debut.; Points: Chattogram Division 8, Rajshahi Division 0

=== Round 2 ===
1–4 November 2025	Dhaka Division	v	Sylhet Division	Match drawn
Match 5 Scorcard	310 (108.5 overs); Mahidul Islam Ankon 122 (272); Khaled Ahmed 3/55 (20.5 overs)		290 (102.2 overs); Mushfiqur Rahim 115 (205); Ripon Mondol 4/50 (21 overs)	Sylhet International Cricket Stadium, Sylhet; Umpires: Mozahiduzzaman and Tanvir Ahmed; Player of the match: Mahidul Islam Ankon (Dhaka Division)
Match 5 Scorcard	222/2d (64 overs); Jishan Alam 94 (125); Sahanur Rahman 1/31 (11 overs)		13/0 (4 overs); Shykat Ali 12* (19); Nazmul Islam 0/4 (2 overs)	Sylhet International Cricket Stadium, Sylhet; Umpires: Mozahiduzzaman and Tanvir Ahmed; Player of the match: Mahidul Islam Ankon (Dhaka Division)
Sylhet Division won the and elected to field.; Points: Dhaka Division 2, Sylhet Division 2

1–4 November 2025	Mymensingh Division	v	Rangpur Division	Match drawn
Match 6 Scorcard	556/6d (143 overs); Mahfijul Islam 127 (228); Alauddin Babu 2/44 (13 overs)		127 (45.1 overs); Alauddin Babu 45* (58); Arif Ahmed 3/28 (10.1)	Cox's Bazar International Cricket Stadium, Cox's Bazar; Umpires: Manjural Islam and Moniruzzaman; Player of the match: Abdul Mazid (Mymensingh Division)
Match 6 Scorcard			112/2 (33 overs) (f/o); Abdullah Al Mamun 69* (85); Arif Ahmed 2/25 (11)	Cox's Bazar International Cricket Stadium, Cox's Bazar; Umpires: Manjural Islam and Moniruzzaman; Player of the match: Abdul Mazid (Mymensingh Division)
Mymensingh Division won the toss and elected to bat.; Iqbal Hosen (Rangpur Division) made his first-class debut.; Points: Mymensingh Division 2, Rangpur Division 2

1–4 November 2025	Khulna Division	v	Rajshahi Division	Rajshahi Division won by 7 wickets
Match 7 Scorcard	121 (44.5 overs); Mrittunjoy Chowdhury 23 (36); SM Meherob 3/5 (3 overs)		268 (80.2 overs); Shakhir Hossain 189 (172); Nahidul Islam 4/48 (18 overs)	Sher-e-Bangla National Cricket Stadium, Dhaka; Umpires: Ali Arman and Mahfuzur Rahman; Player of the match: SM Meherob (Rajshahi Division)
Match 7 Scorcard	255 (87.5 overs); Mehidy Hasan Miraz 48 (62); Ali Mohammad Walid 3/29 (10 overs)		114/3 (23.5 overs); Habibur Rahman Sohan 62 (68); Yasen Muntasir 2/35 (6 overs)	Sher-e-Bangla National Cricket Stadium, Dhaka; Umpires: Ali Arman and Mahfuzur Rahman; Player of the match: SM Meherob (Rajshahi Division)
Khulna Division won the toss and elected to bat.; Points: Rajshahi Division 8, Khulna Division 0

1–4 November 2025	Chattogram Division	v	Barishal Division	Match drawn
Match 8 Scorcard	358 (108.3 overs); Sadikur Rahman 122 (174); Tanvir Islam 4/56 (26.3 overs)		259/4d Salman Hossain Emon 120* (242); Hasan Murad 2/61 (21 overs)	Cox's Bazar International Cricket Stadium Academy Ground, Cox's Bazar; Umpires: Muhammad Kamruzzaman and Sohrab Hossain; Player of the match: Salmon Hossain Emon (Barishal Division)
Match 8 Scorcard	35/0d Mahmudul Hasan Joy 25* (14); Tanvir Islam 0/11 (2 overs)		19/0; Yeasin Arafat 13* (37); Ashraful Hossain 0/2 (2 overs)	Cox's Bazar International Cricket Stadium Academy Ground, Cox's Bazar; Umpires: Muhammad Kamruzzaman and Sohrab Hossain; Player of the match: Salmon Hossain Emon (Barishal Division)
Chattogram Division won the toss and elected to bat.; Points: Chattogram Division 2, Barishal Division 2

=== Round 3 ===
8–11 November 2025	Sylhet Division	v	Rangpur Division	Match drawn
Match 9 Scorecard	199 (58.3 overs); Amite Hasan 91 (110); Robiul Haque 3/32 (17.2 overs)		245 (89.5 overs); Robiul Haque 70 (173); Abu Jayed 4/46 (21.2 overs)	Cox's Bazar International Cricket Stadium, Cox's Bazar; Umpires: Ali Arman and Barkatulylah Turkey; Player of the match: Mubin Ahmed Dishan (Sylhet Division)
Match 9 Scorecard	294/9d (96 overs); Mubin Ahmed Dishan 141 (262); Robiul Haque 3/46 (17 overs)		112/4 (41 overs); Abdullah Al Mamun 43 (87); Rejaur Rahman Raja 2/21 (8 overs)	Cox's Bazar International Cricket Stadium, Cox's Bazar; Umpires: Ali Arman and Barkatulylah Turkey; Player of the match: Mubin Ahmed Dishan (Sylhet Division)
Sylhet Division won the toss and elected to bat.; Ashraful Hasan Rihad (Sylhet Division) and Shaikh Imtiaz Shihab (Rangpur Division) made their first-class debuts.; Points: Sylhet Division 2, Rangpur Division 2

8–11 November 2025	Mymensingh Division	v	Dhaka Division	Match drawn
Match 10; Scorecard	336 (102.1 overs); Mohammad Naim 90 (156); Salauddin Sakil 4/45 (16.1 overs)		388 (153.3 overs); Anisul Islam Emon 79* (160); Shohidul Islam 4/73 (28 overs)	Cox's Bazar International Cricket Stadium Academy Ground, Cox's Bazar; Umpires: ATM Ikran and Sohrab Hossain; Player of the match: Shohidul Islam (Mymensingh Division)
Match 10; Scorecard	97/0 (17 overs); Mahjiful Islam 51* (53); Taibur Rahman 0/3 (1 over)			Cox's Bazar International Cricket Stadium Academy Ground, Cox's Bazar; Umpires: ATM Ikran and Sohrab Hossain; Player of the match: Shohidul Islam (Mymensingh Division)
Mymensingh Division won the toss and elected to bat.; Points: Mymensingh Division 2, Dhaka Division 2

8–11 November 2025	Chattogram Division	v	Khulna Division	Khulna Division won by 2 wickets
Match 11; Scorecard	351 (89.3 overs); Shah Paran 91 (100); Sofor Ali 5/55 (19 overs)		281 (81.2 overs); Soumya Sarkar 92 (119); Mehedi Hasan 4/66 (22 overs)	Bir Shrestho Flight Lieutenant Matiur Rahman Cricket Stadium, Chittagong; Umpires: Ishtiaq Ahmed and Masudur Rahman; Player of the match: Soumya Sarkar (Khulna Division)
Match 11; Scorecard	166 (48.5 overs); Nayeem Hasan 61 (92); Mahedi Hasan 3/56 (18 overs)		237/8 (66.5 overs); Soumya Sarkar 71 (90); Nayeem Hasan 5/105 (32 overs)	Bir Shrestho Flight Lieutenant Matiur Rahman Cricket Stadium, Chittagong; Umpires: Ishtiaq Ahmed and Masudur Rahman; Player of the match: Soumya Sarkar (Khulna Division)
Khulna Division won the toss and elected to field.; Shah Paran (Chattogram Division) made his first-class debut.; Points: Khulna Division 8, Chattogram Division 0

8–11 November 2025	Barishal Division	v	Rajshahi Division	Barishal Division won by 54 runs
Match 12; Scorecard	212 (77 overs); Salman Hossain Emon 58 (102); Rahim Ahmed 2/27 (13 overs)		235 (72.4 overs); Pritom Kumar 65 (93); Tanvir Islam 5/102 (33.4 overs)	Khulna Divisional Stadium, Khulna; Umpires: Manjurul Islam and Sajedul Islam; Player of the match: Tanvir Islam (Barishal Division)
Match 12; Scorecard	268 (89.4 overs); Fazle Mahmud 69 (136); Ali Mohammam Walid 3/57 (15.5 overs)		191 (74.5 overs); Sabbir Hossain 33 (49); Tanvir Islam 4/52 (32.5 overs)	Khulna Divisional Stadium, Khulna; Umpires: Manjurul Islam and Sajedul Islam; Player of the match: Tanvir Islam (Barishal Division)
Rajshahi Division won the toss and elected to field.; Emon Ali (Rajshahi Division) made his first-class debut.; Points: Barishal Division 8, Rajshahi Division 0

=== Round 4 ===
15–17 November 2025	Mymensingh Division	v	Chattogram Division	Mymensingh Division won by 251 runs
Match 14; Scorecard	288 (92.5 overs); Aich Mollah 65 (136); Ifran Hossain 4/66 (14.5 overs)		210 (52 overs); Shahadat Hossain 65 (87); Arif Ahmed 4/50 (15 overs)	Cox's Bazar International Cricket Stadium Academy Ground, Cox's Bazar; Umpires: Moniruzzaman and Mozahiduzzaman; Player of the match: Shuvagata Hom (Mymensingh Division)
Match 14; Scorecard	232 (77 overs); Azuzul Hakim 66 (136); Ashraful Hasan Rohan 6/73 (24 overs)		59 (20.1 overs); Shamim Hossain 13 (28); Asadullah Galib 6/21 (10 overs)	Cox's Bazar International Cricket Stadium Academy Ground, Cox's Bazar; Umpires: Moniruzzaman and Mozahiduzzaman; Player of the match: Shuvagata Hom (Mymensingh Division)
Mymensingh Division won the toss and elected to bat.; Azizul Hakim (Mymensingh Division) and Md Rubel (Chattogram Division) made their first-class debuts.; Points: Mymensingh Division 8, Chattogram Division 0

15–18 November 2025	Rajshahi Division	v	Dhaka Division	Match drawn
Match 15; Scorecard	298 (78.1 overs); Sunzamul Islam 112 (181); Ashraful Islam 5/78 (24.1 overs)		382 (112.1 overs); Ashiqur Rahman Shibli 121 (218); Sunzamul Islam 3/81 (29 overs)	Shaheed Qamaruzzaman Stadium, Rajshahi; Umpires: Muhammad Kamruzzaman and Shyful Islam; Player of the match: Sunzamul Islam (Rajshahi Division)
Match 15; Scorecard	360/5d (67.3 overs); Tanzid Hasan 140 (151); Nazmul Islam 2/108 (19.3 overs)		109/4 (37 overs); Anisul Islam Emon 44 (112); Nihaduzzaman 3/27 (13 overs)	Shaheed Qamaruzzaman Stadium, Rajshahi; Umpires: Muhammad Kamruzzaman and Shyful Islam; Player of the match: Sunzamul Islam (Rajshahi Division)
Rajshahi Division won the toss and elected to bat.; Abdur Rahim (Rajshahi Division) made his first-class debut.; Points: Rajshahi Division 2, Dhaka Division 2

15–17 November 2025	Barishal Division	v	Rangpur Division	Rangpur Division won by 8 wickets
Match 16; Scorecard	196 (52.4 overs); Fazle Mahmud 80 (133); Robiul Haque 5/25 (11.4 overs)		202 (76 overs); Nasir Hossain 37 (53); Tanvir Islam 3/34 (16 overs)	Shaheed Chandu Stadium, Bogra; Umpires: Mahfuzur Rahman and Nazmul Hasan; Player of the match: Mukidul Islam (Rangpur Division)
Match 16; Scorecard	141 (38.2 overs); Tasamul Haque 34 (61); Mukidul Islam 5/53 (12.2 overs)		139/2 (30.2 overs); Mim Mosaddeak 80 (93); Tanvir Islam 1/26 (10 overs)	Shaheed Chandu Stadium, Bogra; Umpires: Mahfuzur Rahman and Nazmul Hasan; Player of the match: Mukidul Islam (Rangpur Division)
Rangpur Division won the toss and elected to bat.; Points: Rangpur Division 8, Barishal Division 0

16–19 November 2025	Khulna Division	v	Sylhet Division	Match drawn
Match 13; Scorecard	259 (73.1 overs); Mohammad Mithun 44 (50); Nasum Ahmed 4/61 (25.1 overs)		323 (97.4 overs); Zakir Hasan 78 (125); Sofor Ali 3/66 (22.4 overs)	Sylhet Outer Cricket Stadium, Sylhet; Umpires: Gazi Sohel and Shafeen Shareef; Player of the match: Nasum Ahmed (Sylhet Division)
Match 13; Scorecard	277 (86.4 overs); Imranuzzaman 62 (136); Nasum Ahmed 5/80 (34 overs)		192/9 (50.3 overs); Zakir Hasan 77 (124); Mehedi Hasan Rana 3/19 (5 overs)	Sylhet Outer Cricket Stadium, Sylhet; Umpires: Gazi Sohel and Shafeen Shareef; Player of the match: Nasum Ahmed (Sylhet Division)
Sylhet Division won the toss and elected to field.; Kalam Siddiki and Samiun Bassir (Khulna Division) made their first-class debuts.; Points: Khulna Division 2, Sylhet Division 2

=== Round 5 ===
22–24 November 2025	Sylhet Division	v	Chattogram Division	Sylhet Division won by 147 runs
Match 17; Scorecard	255 (68 overs); Zakir Hasan 73 (124); Ifran Hossain 4/65 (18 overs)		110 (33.5 overs); Ahmed Sharif (cricketer) 23* (51); Abu Jayed 5/37 (12.5 overs)	Shaheed Chandu Stadium, Bogra; Umpires: Kamruzzaman Limon and Moniruzzaman; Player of the match: Abu Jayed (Sylhet Division)
Match 17; Scorecard	232 (48.5 overs); Zakir Hasan 61 (88); Ifran Hossain 5/38 (12.5 overs)		205 (55 overs); Shahadat Hossain 62* (116); Abu Jayed 4/43 (14 overs)	Shaheed Chandu Stadium, Bogra; Umpires: Kamruzzaman Limon and Moniruzzaman; Player of the match: Abu Jayed (Sylhet Division)
Chattogram Division won the toss and elected to field.; Jillur Rahman Bejoy (Chattogram Division) made his first-class debut.; Points: Sylhet Division 8, Chattogram Division 0

22–25 November 2025	Khulna Division	v	Mymensingh Division	Match drawn
Match 18; Scorecard	387 (103.1 overs); Soumya Sarkar 186 (222); Shuvagata Hom 4/81 (19.1 overs)		459/8d (150.2 overs); Md Al-Amin 102 (191); Sofor Ali 3/62 (23 overs)	Khulna Divisional Stadium, Khulna; Umpires: Muhammad Kamruzzaman and Rakibul Islam; Player of the match: Soumya Sarkar (Khulna Division)
Match 18; Scorecard	140/5 (56 overs); Soumya Sarkar 44 (63); Shuvagata Hom 2/46 (13 overs)			Khulna Divisional Stadium, Khulna; Umpires: Muhammad Kamruzzaman and Rakibul Islam; Player of the match: Soumya Sarkar (Khulna Division)
Khulna Division won the toss and elected to bat.; Points: Khulna Division 2, Mymensingh Division 2

22–25 November 2025	Dhaka Division	v	Barishal Division	Barishal Division won by 6 wickets
Match 19; Scorecard	273 (87 overs); Marshall Ayub 120 (194); Mojammel Hasan Shakil 3/51 (20 overs)		341 (110 overs); Iftakhar Hossain Ifti 78 (196); Sumon Khan 4/78 (24 overs)	Cox's Bazar International Cricket Stadium, Cox's Bazar; Umpires: Amit Mojumder and Mahfuzur Rahman; Player of the match: Tanvir Islam (Barishal Division)
Match 19; Scorecard	169 (70 overs); Joyraz Sheik 32 (64); Tanvir Islam 7/64 (31 overs)		107/4 (34.3 overs); Iftakhar Hossain Ifti 57* (77); Nazmul Islam 2/25 (13 overs)	Cox's Bazar International Cricket Stadium, Cox's Bazar; Umpires: Amit Mojumder and Mahfuzur Rahman; Player of the match: Tanvir Islam (Barishal Division)
Dhaka Division won the toss and elected to bat.; Md Abdullah and Ovi Ahmed Nobel (Barishal Division) made their first-class debuts.; Points: Barishal Division 8, Dhaka Division 0

22–24 November 2025	Rajshahi Division	v	Rangpur Division	Rangpur Division won by 5 wickets
Match 20; Scorecard	268 (67.1 overs); Sabbir Hossain 84 (72); Mukidul Islam 5/42 (14 overs)		258 (80.4 overs); Abdullah Al Mamun 64 (169); Abdur Rahim 6/72 (20.4 overs)	Shaheed Qamaruzzaman Stadium, Rajshahi; Umpires: Ali Arman and Shahin Al Asad; Player of the match: Mukidul Islam (Rangpur Division)
Match 20; Scorecard	119 (37.1 overs); Sabbir Hossain 33 (77); Mehedi Hasan 4/26 (7.1 overs)		132/5 (30.3 overs); Nasir Hossain 52* (64); Abdur Rahim 2/40 (12 overs)	Shaheed Qamaruzzaman Stadium, Rajshahi; Umpires: Ali Arman and Shahin Al Asad; Player of the match: Mukidul Islam (Rangpur Division)
Rangpur Division won the toss and elected to field.; Nayeem Ahmed and Sakib Shahriyar (Rajshahi Division) made their first-class debuts.; Points: Rangpur Division 9, Rajshahi Division 0

=== Round 6 ===
30 November – 3 December 2025	Rajshahi Division	v	Sylhet Division	Sylhet Division won by 10 wickets
Match 21; Scorecard	236 (61.4 overs); SM Meherob 56 (76); Nabil Samad 4/42 (17.4 overs)		535/8d (119.4 overs); Amite Hasan 213 (251); Nahid Rana 3/88 (23.4 overs)	Sylhet International Cricket Stadium, Sylhet; Umpires: Barkatulylah Turkey and Shafeen Shareef; Player of the match: Amite Hasan (Sylhet Division)
Match 21; Scorecard	336 (96.4 overs); Pritom Kumar 143 (233); Nabil Samad 3/70 (17.4 overs)		38/0 (9.2 overs); Zakir Hasan 20* (33); Rahim Ahmed 0/11 (4 overs)	Sylhet International Cricket Stadium, Sylhet; Umpires: Barkatulylah Turkey and Shafeen Shareef; Player of the match: Amite Hasan (Sylhet Division)
Sylhet Division won the toss and elected to field.; Points: Sylhet Division 10, Rajshahi Division 0

30 November – 3 December 2025	Mymensingh Division	v	Barishal Division	Mymensingh Division won by 63 runs
Match 22; Scorecard	354 (87.3 overs); Abu Hider 97 (76); Ruyel Miah 5/75 (20.3 overs)		217 (55.3 overs); Fazle Mahmud 92 (142); Asadullah Galib 4/45 (15 overs)	Sylhet Outer Cricket Stadium, Sylhet; Umpires: Sajedul Islam and Shahin Al Asad; Player of the match: Abu Hider (Mymensingh Division)
Match 22; Scorecard	242/9 (47.5 overs); Md Al-Amin 86 (73); Ruyel Miah 5/64 (13 overs)		316 (82.4 overs); Sohag Gazi 102 (149); Asadullah Galib 3/46 (19.4 overs)	Sylhet Outer Cricket Stadium, Sylhet; Umpires: Sajedul Islam and Shahin Al Asad; Player of the match: Abu Hider (Mymensingh Division)
Mymensingh Division won the toss and elected to bat.; Points: Mymensingh Division 8, Barishal Division 0

30 November – 3 December 2025	Khulna Division	v	Dhaka Division	Match drawn
Match 23; Scorecard	194 (59.3 overs); Mohammad Mithun 59 (67); Sumon Khan 3/32 (15 overs)		310 (108.2 overs); Foysal Ahmed 77 (186); Awlad Hossain 4/79 (27.2 overs)	Khulna Divisional Stadium, Khulna; Umpires: Ali Arman and Ishtiaq Ahmed; Player of the match: Foysal Ahmed (Dhaka Division)
Match 23; Scorecard	280 (102.4 overs); Imranuzzaman 66 (311); Sumon Khan 3/48 (19.4 overs)		123/6 (30 overs); Rayan Rahman 54* (93); Ziaur Rahman 2/15 (6 overs)	Khulna Divisional Stadium, Khulna; Umpires: Ali Arman and Ishtiaq Ahmed; Player of the match: Foysal Ahmed (Dhaka Division)
Khulna Division won the toss and elected to bat.; Foysal Ahmed (Dhaka Division) made his first-class debut.; Points: Khulna Division 2, Dhaka Division 2

30 November – 2 December 2025	Chattogram Division	v	Rangpur Division	Chattogram Division won by an innings and 43 runs
Match 24; Scorecard	350 (102.5 overs); Jillur Rahman Bejoy 113 (204); Robiul Haque 3/55 (23 overs)		126 (43.3 overs); Tanbir Hayder 46* (78); Hasan Mahmud (cricketer) 5/31 (13 overs)	Cox's Bazar International Cricket Stadium, Cox's Bazar; Umpires: Mozahiduzzaman and Rakibul Islam; Player of the match: Jillur Rahman Bejoy (Chattogram Division)
Match 24; Scorecard			181 (72.3 overs) (f/o); Akbar Ali 58 (93); Nayeem Hasan 4/57 (27 overs)	Cox's Bazar International Cricket Stadium, Cox's Bazar; Umpires: Mozahiduzzaman and Rakibul Islam; Player of the match: Jillur Rahman Bejoy (Chattogram Division)
Rangpur Division won the toss and elected to field.; Omar Hasan (Chattogram Division) made his first-class debut.; Points: Chattogram Division 9, Rangpur Division 0

=== Round 7 ===
6–9 December 2025	Barishal Division	v	Sylhet Division	Match drawn
Match 25; Scorecard	312 (93.4 overs); Sohag Gazi 68 (70); Mohiuddin Tareq 3/41 (12 overs)		287 (90.5 overs); Zakir Hasan 130 (185); Ruyel Miah 5/84 (22.5 overs)	Shaheed Qamaruzzaman Stadium, Rajshahi; Umpires: Moniruzzaman and Mozahiduzzaman; Player of the match: Iftakhar Hossain Ifti (Barishal Division)
Match 25; Scorecard	294/8d (66 overs); Iftakhar Hossain Ifti 128* (197); Tofael Ahmed 3/55 (12 overs)		187/5 (59 overs); Asadulla Al Galib 61* (112); Moin Khan 2/25 (12 overs)	Shaheed Qamaruzzaman Stadium, Rajshahi; Umpires: Moniruzzaman and Mozahiduzzaman; Player of the match: Iftakhar Hossain Ifti (Barishal Division)
Barishal Division won the toss and elected to bat.; Points: Barishal Division 2, Sylhet Division 2

6–9 December 2025	Rajshahi Division	v	Mymensingh Division	Rajshahi Division won by 146 runs
Match 26; Scorecard	219 (54.2 overs); Nayeem Ahmed 81 (128); Abu Hider 3/61 (12 overs)		137 (45.1 overs); Khalid Hasan 37 (90); Sunzamul Islam 5/18 (5.1 overs)	Sylhet International Cricket Stadium, Sylhet; Umpires: Kamruzzaman Limon and Masudur Rahman; Player of the match: Sunzamul Islam (Rajshahi Division)
Match 26; Scorecard	345 (85.3 overs); Shakhir Hossain 94 (128); Rakibul Hasan 3/75 (24.3 overs)		281 (59.2 overs); Abu Hider 141* (127); Sunzamul Islam 5/88 (13.2 overs)	Sylhet International Cricket Stadium, Sylhet; Umpires: Kamruzzaman Limon and Masudur Rahman; Player of the match: Sunzamul Islam (Rajshahi Division)
Mymensingh Division won the toss and elected to field.; Points: Rajshahi Division 8, Mymensingh Division 0

6–8 December 2025	Dhaka Division	v	Chattogram Division	Dhaka Division won by an innings and 192 runs
Match 27; Scorecard	541/6d (130.2 overs); Anisul Islam Emon 186 (238); Ifran Hossain 2/87 (21 overs)		158 (39.5 overs); Irfaan Shukkur 43 (37); Ripon Mondol 3/30 (12 overs)	Sher-e-Bangla National Cricket Stadium, Dhaka; Umpires: Morshed Ali Khan and Shafeen Shareef; Player of the match: Anisul Islam Emon (Dhaka Division)
Match 27; Scorecard			191 (35 overs) (f/o); Hasan Murad 52 (32); Nazmul Islam 3/54 (10 overs)	Sher-e-Bangla National Cricket Stadium, Dhaka; Umpires: Morshed Ali Khan and Shafeen Shareef; Player of the match: Anisul Islam Emon (Dhaka Division)
Chatogram Division won the toss and elected to field.; Points: Dhaka Division 9, Chattogram Division 0

6–8 December 2025	Khulna Division	v	Rangpur Division	Rangpur Division won by 7 wickets
Match 28; Scorecard	308 (81.1 overs); Soumya Sarkar 56 (55); Nasir Hossain 3/51 (16 overs)		174 (46.5 overs); Alauddin Babu 44 (56); Sofor Ali 5/78 (12.5 overs)	Shaheed Chandu Stadium, Bogra; Umpires: Mahfuzur Rahman and Tanvir Ahmed; Player of the match: Iqbal Hosen (Rangpur Division)
Match 28; Scorecard	96 (33.1 overs); Ziaur Rahman 30 (47); Mukidul Islam 5/22 (11 overs)		231/3 (55 overs); Iqbal Hosen 114* 170; Nahidul Islam 1/33 (17 overs)	Shaheed Chandu Stadium, Bogra; Umpires: Mahfuzur Rahman and Tanvir Ahmed; Player of the match: Iqbal Hosen (Rangpur Division)
Rangpur Division won the toss and elected to field.; Points: Rangpur Division 8, Khulna Division 0

== Statistics ==
=== Most runs ===
Most runs scored by a batter
Runs	Player	Team	MP	Inns.	Ave	SR	50s	100s	HS
633	Soumya Sarkar	Khulna	7	14	45.21	76.44	4	1	186
628	Zakir Hasan	Sylhet	7	13	57.09	63.88	5	1	130
625	Marshall Ayub	Dhaka	7	12	62.50	58.41	2	3	165
574	Pritom Kumar	Rajshahi	7	14	41.00	62.52	2	2	143
547	Mohammad Naim	Mymensingh	7	12	49.72	68.37	5	1	111

=== Most wickets ===
Most wickets taken by a bowler
Wkts.	Player	Team	MP	Inns.	Ov.	Runs	Ave	Eco.	5WI	BBI
34	Tanvir Islam	Barishal	7	13	282	769	22.61	2.72	2	7/64
29	Mukidul Islam	Rangpur	4	8	115.4	378	13.03	3.26	3	5/22
27	Ruyel Miah	Barishal	6	11	162.2	576	21.33	3.54	3	5/64
27	Nayeem Hasan	Chattogram	7	13	289	949	35.14	3.28	2	5/76
25	Abu Jayed	Sylhet	5	10	133.5	465	18.60	3.47	1	5/37
