= 2026–27 National Cricket League =

Bangladeshi cricket tournament

- Dates: 3 October – 17 November 2026
- Administrator: BCB
- Cricket format: First-class cricket
- Tournament format: Round-robin
- Host: Bangladesh
- Champions: Khulna Division (8th title)
- Participants: 8
- Matches: 28
- Player of the series: Mim Mosaddeak
- Most runs: Mim Mosaddeak (804)
- Most wickets: Hasan Murad (41)

The 2026–27 National Cricket League was the 28th edition of the National Cricket League, a first-class cricket competition in Bangladesh. Rangpur Division was the previous season's champion. The tournament ran from 3 October to 17 November 2026.

Khulna Division won their eighth title in the final round, becoming the most successful team in the league.

== Teams ==
Eight teams were participated in the tournament. The teams are listed below.

1. Barisal Division
2. Chattogram Division
3. Dhaka Division
4. Khulna Division
5. Mymensingh Division
6. Rajshahi Division
7. Rangpur Division
8. Sylhet Division

== Venues ==
Locations of all stadiums which have hosted 2025-26 National Cricket League

Bogra	Chittagong	Cox's Bazar	Dhaka
Shaheed Chandu Stadium	Bir Shrestho Flight Lieutenant Matiur Rahman Cricket Stadium	Cox's Bazar International Cricket Stadium	Sher-e-Bangla National Cricket Stadium
Capacity: 15,000	Capacity: 22,000	Capacity: 7,800	Capacity: 26,000
	Zahur Ahmed Chowdhury Stadium		Sher-e-Bangla National Cricket Stadium
Matches:	Matches:	Matches:	Matches:
Khulna	Rajshahi	Sylhet	Sylhet
Khulna Divisional Stadium	Rajshahi Divisional Stadium	Sylhet International Cricket Stadium	SICS Academy Ground
Capacity: 15,000	Capacity: 15,000	Capacity: 18,500	
	Shaheed Qamaruzzaman Stadium	Sylhet International Cricket Stadium	
Matches:	Matches:	Matches:	Matches:

== Points table ==
Pos	Team	Pld	W	L	T	D	NR	Pts	
1	Khulna Division	7	4	0	0	3	0		Champions
2	Sylhet Division	7	3	1	0	3	0		
3	Chattogram Division	7	3	1	0	3	0		
4	Dhaka Division	7	1	1	0	5	0		
5	Mymensingh Division	7	1	1	0	5	0		
6	Rangpur Division	7	1	2	0	4	0		
7	Rajshahi Division	7	1	3	0	3	0		
8	Barishal Division	7	0	5	0	2	0		

Source: Cricinfo Cricheroes

== Fixtures ==
=== Round 1 ===
3–6 October 2026
Scorecard

Mymensingh Division	v	Sylhet Division
311 (98 overs); Mahfijul Islam 70 (135); Tofael Ahmed 3/46 (21 overs)		327 (111 overs); Asadulla Al Galib 67 (115); Azijul Hakim Rony 4/79 (33 overs)
372/6 (117 overs); Mahfijul Islam 100 (197); Naeem Ahmed 5/119 (40 overs)

Match drawn
Sylhet International Cricket Stadium, Sylhet
Umpires: Sajidul Islam and Tanvir Ahmed
Player of the match: Naeem Ahmed

- Sylhet won the toss and elected to field.
- Anik Debbarma (Sylhet), Azijul Hakim Rony and Md Fahim (Mymensingh) all made their first-class debuts.
- Mahfijul Islam (Mymensingh) scored his 500th run in first-class cricket.

3–6 October 2026
Scorecard

Rangpur Division	v	Dhaka Division
340 (127 overs); Chowdhury Md Rizwan 75 (156); Arif Ahmed 4/92 (40 overs)		284 (119.4 overs); Taibur Rahman 108 (201); Abu Hasim 2/21 (21.1 overs)
149 (62 overs); Akbar Ali 64 (132); Arif Ahmed 3/35 (18 overs)		9/0 (4.1 overs); Mohammad Naim 7* (11)

Match drawn
Sher-e-Bangla National Cricket Stadium, Dhaka
Umpires: Masudur Rahman and Moniruzzaman
Player of the match: Taibur Rahman

- Dhaka won the toss and elected to field.
- Shadhin Islam (Rangpur) made his first-class debut.
- Taibur Rahman (Dhaka) scored his 5000th run in first-class cricket.
- Sumon Khan (Dhaka) scored his 1000th run in first-class cricket.
- Chowdhury Md Rizwan (Rangpur) scored his maiden first-class fifty.

3–6 October 2026
Scorecard

Khulna Division	v	Barishal Division

- Barishal won the toss and elected to field.

3–6 October 2026
Scorecard

Rajshahi Division	v	Chattogram Division

- Chattogram won the toss and elected to field.

== Statistics ==
=== Most runs ===
Most runs scored by a batter
Runs	Player	Team	MP	Inns.	Ave	SR	50s	100s	HS
804	Mim Mosaddeak	Rangpur	7	14	57.42	56.22	5	3	157
697	Sadikur Rahman	Chattogram	7	10	69.70	64.41	3	3	149
672	Mahfijul Islam	Mymensingh	5	10	74.66	52.17	2	3	217*
612	Mohammad Naim	Dhaka	5	7	102.00	68.15	1	3	282
547	Zakir Hasan	Sylhet	6	9	82.42	60.99	4	2	160

=== Most wickets ===
Most wickets taken by a bowler
Wkts.	Player	Team	MP	Inns.	Ov.	Runs	Ave	Eco.	5WI	BBI
41	Hasan Murad	Chattogram	7	14	341.3	955	23.29	2.79	1	6/71
40	Nasum Ahmed	Sylhet	6	11	266.2	840	21.00	3.15	4	5/43
26	Parvez Rahman Jibon	Khulna	6	12	200.1	619	23.80	3.09	0	4/47
25	Naeem Ahmed	Sylhet	6	11	205.3	594	23.76	2.89	1	5/119
24	Sofor Ali	Khulna	6	12	133.3	470	19.58	3.52	1	5/40
