= National Cricket League (disambiguation) =

The National Cricket League is a first-class cricket competition in Bangladesh

National Cricket League may also refer to:

- National Cricket League One-Day, a defunct ODI competition in Bangladesh
- National Cricket League Twenty20, a T20 competition in Bangladesh
