= National Cricket League Twenty20 =

Bangladeshi Cricket Tournament

National Cricket League T20
- Countries: Bangladesh
- Administrator: Bangladesh Cricket Board
- First edition: 2010
- Latest edition: 2024–25
- Next edition: 2025–26
- Number of teams: 8
- Current champion: Rangpur Division (1st title)
- 2025–26

The National Cricket League Twenty20 is a Twenty20 Cricket competition element of the National Cricket League. The tournament is organised by the Bangladesh Cricket Board. The eight teams representing eight of the divisions of Bangladesh.

== Background ==
The National Cricket League Twenty20 aims to foster the growth of domestic T20 cricket in Bangladesh, providing a platform for young and emerging cricketers to showcase their talent. The tournament, which follows a round-robin format leading to knockout stages, has drawn significant attention from local fans and stakeholders, looking forward to seeing future stars of Bangladesh cricket. In addition to its role in the national selection process, the NCL T20 has also garnered interest from various franchise leagues, positioning it as an essential part of the Bangladesh Cricket Board's (BCB) strategy to build a strong T20 ecosystem in the country. The competition is seen as a critical component in developing Bangladesh's readiness for international T20 tournaments such as the ICC Men's T20 World Cup.

== Teams ==
Eight teams were participated in the tournament. The teams are listed below.

1. Barisal Division
2. Chittagong Division
3. Dhaka Division
4. Khulna Division
5. Mymensingh Division
6. Rajshahi Division
7. Rangpur Division
8. Sylhet Division

Defunct team: Dhaka Metropolis

== Venues ==
- All matches are scheduled to be played across these three venues.

Rajshahi	Bogura	Sylhet
Shaheed Qamaruzzaman Stadium	Shaheed Chandu Stadium	Sylhet International Cricket Stadium
Capacity: 15,000	Capacity: 18,000	Capacity: 18,500
		Sylhet International Cricket Stadium

Venues of NCL T20 2025

== Winners ==
- 2010 – Rajshahi Division
- 2024 – Rangpur Division
- 2025 – Rangpur Division

== Broadcasting ==
Territory	Channels and streaming	Digital Streaming
Bangladesh	T Sports	T Sports app
India / Nepal		FanCode
Rest of the World		T Sports YouTube

- Source: BCB
