= Bangladeshi cricket team in Zimbabwe in 2026 =

International cricket tour

	Zimbabwe	Bangladesh
- Dates: 28 June – 19 July 2026
Captains	Richard Ngarava (Note: Sikandar Raza captained Zimbabwe in the 3rd ODI.) (Test and ODIs) Sikandar Raza (T20Is)	Najmul Hossain Shanto (Test) Mehidy Hasan Miraz (ODIs) Towhid Hridoy (T20Is)

Test series
- Result: Zimbabwe won the 1-match series 1–0
Most runs	Innocent Kaia (140)	Mominul Haque (73)
Most wickets	Blessing Muzarabani (7); Newman Nyamhuri (7)	Taijul Islam (7)

One Day International series
- Results: Zimbabwe won the 3-match series 2–1
Most runs	Ben Curran (131)	Tanzid Hasan (159)
Most wickets	Richard Ngarava (7)	Nahid Rana (7)
- Player of the series: Brad Evans (Zim)

Twenty20 International series
- Results: Bangladesh won the 3-match series 2–1
Most runs	Brian Bennett (102)	Tanzid Hasan (140)
Most wickets	Richard Ngarava (8)	Nahid Rana (5); Rishad Hossain (5); Mohammad Saifuddin (5)
- Player of the series: Tanzid Hasan (Ban)

The Bangladesh cricket team toured Zimbabwe from June to July 2026. The tour consisted of one Test, three One Day International (ODI), and three Twenty20 International (T20I) matches. The tour was confirmed by Zimbabwe Cricket in May 2026.

== Squads ==
Zimbabwe			Bangladesh		
Test	ODIs	T20Is	Test	ODIs	T20Is
Richard Ngarava (c); Brian Bennett; Tanaka Chivanga; Graeme Cremer; Ben Curran; Craig Ervine; Brad Evans; Innocent Kaia; Roy Kaia; Wessly Madhevere; Tadiwanashe Marumani (wk); Blessing Muzarabani; Newman Nyamhuri; Brendan Taylor (wk); Tafadzwa Tsiga (wk)	Richard Ngarava (c); Sikandar Raza (vc); Brian Bennett; Ryan Burl; Ben Curran; Craig Ervine; Brad Evans; Innocent Kaia; Clive Madande (wk); Wessly Madhevere; Tadiwanashe Marumani (wk); Wellington Masakadza; Ernest Masuku; Blessing Muzarabani; Newman Nyamhuri	Sikandar Raza (c); Brian Bennett; Ryan Burl; Ben Curran; Brad Evans; Clive Madande (wk); Tinotenda Maposa; Tadiwanashe Marumani (wk); Wellington Masakadza; Tashinga Musekiwa; Blessing Muzarabani; Dion Myers; Richard Ngarava; Newman Nyamhuri; Milton Shumba	Najmul Hossain Shanto (c); Khaled Ahmed; Mahidul Islam Ankon (wk); ~~Litton Das (wk)~~; Mominul Haque; Robiul Haque; Amite Hasan (wk); Nayeem Hasan; Tanzid Hasan; Ebadot Hossain; Tawhid Hridoy; Shadman Islam; Taijul Islam; Mahmudul Hasan Joy; Hasan Mahmud; Mushfiqur Rahim	Mehidy Hasan Miraz (c); Najmul Hossain Shanto (vc); Taskin Ahmed; ~~Litton Das~~ (wk); Parvez Hossain Emon (wk) (Note: Only for the 2nd and 3rd ODIs.); Tanzid Hasan; Nurul Hasan; Saif Hassan; Mosaddek Hossain; Rishad Hossain; Shoriful Islam; Tanvir Islam; Towhid Hridoy; Mustafizur Rahman; Nahid Rana; Soumya Sarkar	Tawhid Hridoy (c); Nasum Ahmed; Yasir Ali; Parvez Hossain Emon (wk); Mahedi Hasan; Nurul Hasan (wk); Tanzid Hasan; Saif Hassan; Mosaddek Hossain; Rishad Hossain; Shoriful Islam; Mustafizur Rahman; Nahid Rana; Mohammad Saifuddin; Abdul Gaffar Saqlain

Ahead of the tour, Litton Das was ruled out of the Bangladesh Test team and replaced by Mahidul Islam Ankon. On 8 July, Das was also ruled out of the ODI squad, with Parvez Hossain Emon added into the squad for the 2nd and 3rd ODIs.

== Only Test ==
28–30 June 2026
Scorecard

Bangladesh	v	Zimbabwe
140 (47.2 overs); Mominul Haque 60 (81); Newman Nyamhuri 4/61 (12.2 overs)		410 (107.2 overs); Innocent Kaia 140 (227); Taijul Islam 7/138 (40.2 overs)
185 (45 overs); Mushfiqur Rahim 34 (62); Blessing Muzarabani 4/65 (17 overs)

Zimbabwe won by an innings and 85 runs
Harare Sports Club, Harare
Umpires: Allahuddien Paleker (SA) and Rashid Riaz (Pak)
Player of the match: Innocent Kaia (Zim)

- Zimbabwe won the toss and elected to field.
- Tawhid Hridoy and Amite Hasan (Ban) both made their Test debuts.
- Innocent Kaia (Zim) scored his maiden century in Tests.
- This is the largest victory for Zimbabwe in tests.

== ODI series ==
=== 1st ODI ===
6 July 2026
09:30
Scorecard

Zimbabwe; 141 (36.4 overs)	v	Bangladesh; 116 (33.1 overs)
Newman Nyamhuri 33 (51); Nahid Rana 6/21 (10 overs)		Nurul Hasan 31 (44); Richard Ngarava 3/31 (7.1 overs)

Zimbabwe won by 25 runs
Harare Sports Club, Harare
Umpires: Allahudien Paleker (SA) and Langton Rusere (Zim)
Player of the match: Newman Nyamhuri (Zim)

- Bangladesh won the toss and elected to field.

=== 2nd ODI ===
9 July 2026
09:30
Scorecard

Zimbabwe; 247/6 (50 overs)	v	Bangladesh; 234 (48.1 overs)
Ben Curran 111* (135); Mehidy Hasan Miraz 2/32 (10 overs)		Tawhid Hridoy 60 (90); Richard Ngarava 3/55 (9.1 overs)

Zimbabwe won by 13 runs
Harare Sports Club, Harare
Umpires: Iknow Chabi (Zim) and Allahudien Paleker (SA)
Player of the match: Ben Curran (Zim)

- Bangladesh won the toss and elected to field.

=== 3rd ODI ===
11 July 2026
09:30
Scorecard

Zimbabwe; 199 (48.1 overs)	v	Bangladesh; 200/3 (36 overs)
Wessly Madhevere 75 (74); Shoriful Islam 4/44 (10 overs)		Tanzid Hasan 94 (101); Ernest Masuku 2/33 (6 overs)

Bangladesh won by 7 wickets
Harare Sports Club, Harare
Umpires: Forster Mutizwa (Zim) and Allahudien Paleker (SA)
Player of the match: Tanzid Hasan (Ban)

- Bangladesh won the toss and elected to field.

== T20I series ==
=== 1st T20I ===
15 July 2026
12:30
Scorecard

Zimbabwe; 170/6 (20 overs)	v	Bangladesh; 138 (19 overs)
Brian Bennett 44 (30); Nahid Rana 4/26 (4 overs)		Yasir Ali 54 (38); Blessing Muzarabani 4/17 (4 overs)

Zimbabwe won by 32 runs
Queens Sports Club, Bulawayo
Umpires: Iknow Chabi (Zim) and Percival Sizara (Zim)
Player of the match: Blessing Muzarabani (Zim)

- Bangladesh won the toss and elected to field.

=== 2nd T20I ===
17 July 2026
12:30
Scorecard

Bangladesh; 186/5 (20 overs)	v	Zimbabwe; 152 (19.4 overs)
Tanzid Hasan 58 (44); Richard Ngarava 2/23 (4 overs)		Ryan Burl 29 (19); Rishad Hossain 4/26 (3.4 overs)

Bangladesh won by 34 runs
Queens Sports Club, Bulawayo
Umpires: Iknow Chabi (Zim) and Langton Rusere (Zim)
Player of the match: Mohammad Saifuddin (Ban)

- Zimbabwe won the toss and elected to field.

=== 3rd T20I ===
19 July 2026
12:30
Scorecard

Zimbabwe; 143/7 (20 overs)	v	Bangladesh; 144/6 (19.4 overs)
Dion Myers 73 (53); Mohammad Saifuddin 2/35 (4 overs)		Tanzid Hasan 66* (58); Richard Ngarava 2/20 (4 overs)

Bangladesh won by 4 wickets
Queens Sports Club, Bulawayo
Umpires: Forster Mutizwa (Zim) and Percival Sizara (Zim)
Player of the match: Tanzid Hasan (Ban)

- Zimbabwe won the toss and elected to bat.
