= Mymensingh Division cricket team =

Personnel
- Captain: Shuvagata Hom
- Coach: Nazmul Hossain
- Owner: Bangladesh Cricket Board

Team information
- Founded: 2025

History
- National Cricket League wins: 0
- NCL T20 wins: 0

The Mymensingh Division cricket team is a Bangladeshi first-class team representing the Mymensingh Division, one of the eight administrative divisions in Bangladesh. The team competes in the National Cricket League (beginning in 2025–26) and the National Cricket League Twenty20 (beginning in 2026–27).

Mymensingh Division was created in 2015 from the northern half of Dhaka Division, becoming the eighth division of Bangladesh. The cricket team was created in 2025, replacing Dhaka Metropolis in national competitions.

The team contested its first match in national competitions on 25 October 2025 when it played Sylhet Division in the National Cricket League. The inaugural captain was Shuvagata Hom, and the coach was Nazmul Hossain, both of whom were born in what is now Mymensingh Division. Mymensingh finished their inaugural tournament in third position out of eight teams, with two wins, four draws and a loss from their seven matches.

== Seasons ==
Season	NCL	One-Day	NCL T20
2025-26	3rd		
2026-27	5th		

== Records ==
As of November 2026

=== Highest team scores ===
Total	Opponent	Venue	Result	Season
555/6d	Rangpur Division	Cox's Bazar	Draw	2025–26
465/7d	Chattogram Division	Bogra	Draw	2026–27
459/8d	Khulna Division	Rajshahi	Draw	2025-26

=== Lowest team scores ===
Total	Opponent	Venue	Result	Season
108	Khulna Division	Khulna	Loss	2026-27
137	Rajshahi Division	Sylhet	Loss	2025–26
232	Chattogram Division	Cox's Bazar	Win	2025–26

=== Most runs in an innings ===
Total	Batsman	Opponent	Venue	Result	Season
220	Mosaddek Hossain	Rajshahi Division	Sylhet	Draw	2026–27
217*	Mahfijul Islam	Chattogram Division	Bogra	Draw	2026–27

=== Best bowling in an innings ===
Total	Bowler	Opponent	Venue	Result	Season
9/168	Rakibul Hasan	Sylhet Division	Sylhet	Draw	2025–26
6/21	Asadullah Galib	Chattogram Division	Cox's Bazar	Win	2025–26
6/40	Yeasin Arafat	Khulna Division	Khulna	Loss	2026-27
