= 2023 ACC Under-19 Asia Cup =

Cricket tournament

- Dates: 8 – 17 December 2023
- Administrator: Asian Cricket Council
- Cricket format: Limited overs cricket
- Tournament format(s): Group stage and final
- Host: United Arab Emirates
- Champions: Bangladesh (1st title)
- Runners-up: United Arab Emirates
- Participants: 8
- Matches: 15
- Player of the series: (Bangladesh) Ashiqur Rahman Shibli
- Most runs: (Bangladesh) Ashiqur Rahman Shibli (378)
- Most wickets: (India) Raj Limbani (12)

2023 ACC Under-19 Asia Cup was the tenth edition of the ACC Under-19 Cup, a limited overs cricket tournament featuring eight under-19 teams. It was scheduled to played between 8 and 17 December 2023. The five full members of the Asian Cricket Council are taking part in the tournament: Afghanistan, Bangladesh, India, Pakistan and Sri Lanka. They joined by the top three ranked teams Nepal, United Arab Emirates and Japan. Originally, the tournament was scheduled to take place in Pakistan but it was shifted to United Arab Emirates later.

Bangladesh won their maiden Under-19 Asia Cup title beating the United Arab Emirates in the final by 195 runs.

== Teams and qualifications ==
Means of qualification	Date	Berths	Qualified
ICC Full Member	—N/a	5	Afghanistan; Bangladesh; India; Pakistan; Sri Lanka
2023 ACC Men's Under-19 Premier Cup	12 – 24 October 2023	3	Japan; Nepal; United Arab Emirates

== Squads ==
Afghanistan	Bangladesh	India	Japan	Nepal	Pakistan	Sri Lanka	United Arab Emirates
Naseer Khan (c); Wafiullah Tarakhil; Jamshid Zadran; Khalid Taniwal; Akram Mohammadzai; Shoail Khan Zurmati; Rahimullah Zurmati; Noman Shah Agha (wk); Mohammad Younus Zadran; Allah Mohammad Ghazanfar; Wahidullah Zadran; Bashir Ahmad Afghan; Faridoon Dawoodzai; Khalil Ahmad	Mahfuzur Rahman Rabby (c); Ashiqur Rahman Shibli; Ahrar Amin; Jishan Alam; Mohammad Rohanat Doullah Borson; Mohammad Asrafuzzaman Boranno; Mohammad Iqbal Hasanemon (wk); Ariful Islam; Parvez Rahman Jibon; Maruf Mridha; Mohammad Rafiuzzaman Rafi; Chowdhury Mohammad Rizwan; Adil Bin Siddik; Mohammad Shihab James; Wasi Siddiquee	Uday Pratap Saharan (c); Saumy Kumar Pandey (vc); Aravelly Avanish Rao (wk); Innesh Mahajan (wk); Murugan Abhishek; Sachin Dhas; Dhanush Gowda; Musheer Khan; Arshin Kulkarni; Raj Limbani; Priyanshu Moliya; Rudra Mayur Patel; Adarsh Singh; Aaradhya Shukla; Naman Tiwari	Koji Hardgrave -Abe (c); Kazuma Kato-Stafford (vc); Chihaya Arakawa; Shotaro Hiratsuka; Charles Hara-Hinze; Hirotake Kakinuma; Hugo Kelly; Daniel Panckhurst (wk); Nihar Parmar; Aditya Phadke; Timothy Moore; Tomo Rear (wk); Aarav Tiwari; Kiefer Yamamoto-Lake	Dev Khanal (c); Deepak Bohara; Tilak Raj Bhandari; Subash Bhandari; Aakash Chand; Hemant Dhami; Dipak Prasad Dumre; Gulshan Jha; Arjun Kumal; Dipesh Prasad Kandel; Bishal Bikram KC; Uttam Thapa Magar; Bipin Rawal (wk); Aakash Tripathi	Saad Baig (c) (wk); Arafat Minhas (vc); Ali Asfand; Azan Awais; Mohammad Tayyab Arif; Amir Hassan; Ahmad Hussain; Shamyl Hussain; Khubaih Khalil; Najab Khan; Naveed Ahmed Khan; Shahzaib Khan; Mohammad Riazullah; Ubaid Shah; Mohammad Zeeshan	Sineth Jayawardene (c); Malsha Tharupathi; Pulindu Perera; Rusanda Gamage; Ravishan Nethsara; Sharujan Shanmuganathan (wk); Dinura Kalupahana; Vishwa Lahiru; Garuka Sanketh; Vishen Halambage; Ruvishan Perera; Vihas Thewmika; Duvindu Ranatunga; Hirun Kapurubandara; Dinuka Thennakoon	Aayan Afzal Khan (c); Ayman Ahamed Shakeel Ahamed; Ammar Badami; Ethan D'Souza; Maroof Merchant; Dhruv Parashar; Hardik Pai; Akshat Rai; Yayin Kiran Rai; Omid Rahman; Aryansh Sharma (wk); Harshit Seth; Harit Shetty; Shrey Sethi; Tanish Suri (wk)

== Group stage ==
The ACC released the fixture details on 8 November 2023.

=== Group A ===
==== Points table ====
Pos	Team	Pld	W	L	T	NR	Pts	NRR	Qualification
1	Pakistan	3	3	0	0	0	6	1.623	Knockout stage
2	India	3	2	1	0	0	4	1.856	Knockout stage
3	Afghanistan	3	1	2	0	0	2	−0.476	
4	Nepal	3	0	3	0	0	0	−3.027	

Source: ESPNcricinfo

=== Fixtures ===
8 December 2023
9:30
Scorecard

Afghanistan; 173 (50 overs)	v	India; 174/3 (37.3 overs)
Jamshid Zadran 43 (75); Arshin Kulkarni 3/29 (8 overs)		Arshin Kulkarni 70* (105); Khalel Ahmad 1/28 (8.3 overs)

India won by 7 wickets
ICC Academy Oval-1, Dubai
Umpires: Rashid Riaz (Pak) and Gazi Sohel (Ban)
Player of the match: Arshin Kulkarni (Ind)

- India won the toss and elected to field.

8 December 2023
9:30
Scorecard

Nepal; 152 (47.2 overs)	v	Pakistan; 153/3 (26.2 overs)
Uttam Thapa Magar 51 (76); Mohammad Zeeshan 6/19 (9.2 overs)		Azan Awais 56* (62); Gulsan Jha 2/54 (8 overs)

Pakistan won by 7 wickets
ICC Academy Oval-2, Dubai
Umpires: Ahmed Shah Durrani (Afg) and Prageeth Rambukwella (SL)
Player of the match: Mohammad Zeeshan (Pak)

- Pakistan won the toss and elected to field.

10 December 2023
9:30
Scorecard

India; 259/9 (50 overs)	v	Pakistan; 263/2 (47 overs)
Adarsh Singh 62 (81); Mohammad Zeeshan 4/46 (10 overs)		Azan Awais 105* (130); Murugan Abhishek 2/55 (9 overs)

Pakistan won by 8 wickets
ICC Academy Oval-1, Dubai
Umpires: Gazi Sohel (Ban) and Raveendra Wimalasiri (SL)
Player of the match: Azan Awais (Pak)

- Pakistan won the toss and elected to field.

10 December 2023
9:30
Scorecard

Afghanistan; 261 (49.3 overs)	v	Nepal; 188 (40.1 overs)
Jamshid Zadran 106* (152); Subash Bhandari 2/49 (10 overs)		Arjun Kumal 91 (108); Faridoon Dawoodzai 3/31 (7.1 overs)

Afghanistan won by 73 runs
ICC Academy Oval-2, Dubai
Umpires: Jayaraman Madanagopal (Ind) and Asif Yaqoob (Pak)
Player of the match: Jamshid Zadran (Afg)

- Nepal won the toss and elected to field.

12 December 2023
9:30
Scorecard

Pakistan; 303 (48 overs)	v	Afghanistan; 220 (48.4 overs)
Shahzaib Khan 79 (95); Faridoon Dawoodzai 3/49 (9 overs)		Numan Shah 54 (78); Tayyab Arif 3/52 (9 overs)

Pakistan won by 83 runs
ICC Academy Oval-1, Dubai
Umpires: Prageeth Rambukwella (SL) and Jayaraman Madanagopal (Ind)
Player of the match: Shamyl Hussain (Pak)

- Afghanistan won the toss and elected to field.

12 December 2023
9:30
Scorecard

Nepal; 52 (22.1 overs)	v	India; 57/0 (7.1 overs)
Hemant Dhami 8 (18); Raj Limbani 7/13 (9.1 overs)		Arshin Kulkarni 43* (30)

India won by 10 wickets
ICC Academy Oval-2, Dubai
Umpires: Rashid Riaz (Pak) and Asif Yaqoob (Pak)
Player of the match: Raj Limbani (Ind)

- India won the toss and elected to field.

=== Group B ===
==== Points table ====
Pos	Team	Pld	W	L	T	NR	Pts	NRR	Qualification
1	Bangladesh	3	3	0	0	0	6	2.107	Knockout stage
2	United Arab Emirates (H)	3	2	1	0	0	4	0.387	Knockout stage
3	Sri Lanka	3	1	2	0	0	2	0.792	
4	Japan	3	0	3	0	0	0	−4.153	

Source: ESPNcricinfo
(H) Host

=== Fixtures ===
9 December 2023
9:30
Scorecard

Bangladesh; 228 (49.3 overs)	v	United Arab Emirates; 167 (47.4 overs)
Ashiqur Rahman Shibli 71 (102); Dhruv Parashar 6/44 (9.3 overs)		Hardik Pai 30* (51); Sheikh Paevez Jibon 4/26 (10 overs)

Bangladesh won by 61 runs
ICC Academy Oval-1, Dubai
Umpires: Izatullah Safi (Afg) and Asif Yaqoob (Pak)
Player of the match: Ashiqur Rahman Shibli (Ban)

- United Arab Emirates won the toss and elected to field.

9 December 2023
9:30
Scorecard

Japan; 75 (30.3 overs)	v	Sri Lanka; 76/3 (12.2 overs)
Charlie Hinze 36 (52); Malsha Tharupath 3/26 (6.3 overs)		Sineth Jayawardena 26* (24); Kiefer Lake 2/27 (5 overs)

Sri Lanka won by 7 wickets
ICC Academy Oval-2, Dubai
Umpires: Akbar Ali (UAE) and Rashid Riaz (Pak)
Player of the match: Malsha Tharupath (SL)

- Sri Lanka won the toss and elected to field.

11 December 2023
9:30
Scorecard

Sri Lanka; 220/9 (50 overs)	v	United Arab Emirates; 224/8 (48.2 overs)
Dinura Kalupahana 56 (87); Aayan Afzal Khan 2/38 (10 overs)		Tanish Suri 75 (87); Garuka Sanketh 3/35 (10 overs)

United Arab Emirates won by 2 wickets
ICC Academy Oval-1, Dubai
Umpires: Sanjay Gurung (Nep) and Gazi Sohel (Ban)
Player of the match: Aayan Afzal Khan (UAE)

- United Arab Emirates won the toss and elected to field.

11 December 2023
9:30
Scorecard

Japan; 99 (47.1 overs)	v	Bangladesh; 100/1 (11.2 overs)
Nihar Parmar 18 (80); Mahfuzur Rahman Rabby 2/9 (8.1 overs)		Ashiqur Rahman Shibli 55* (45); Charles Hinze 1/30 (3.2 overs)

Bangladesh won by 9 wickets
ICC Academy Oval-2, Dubai
Umpires: Akbar Ali (UAE) and Prageeth Rambukwella (SL)
Player of the match: Ashiqur Rahman Shibli (Ban)

- Bangladesh won the toss and elected to field.

13 December 2023
9:30
Scorecard

Sri Lanka; 200/9 (50 overs)	v	Bangladesh; 204/4 (40.5 overs)
Sineth Jayawardena 25 (30); Wasi Siddiquee 3/32 (10 overs)		Ashiqur Rahman Shibli 116* (130); Garuka Sanketh 2/56 (7.5 overs)

Bangladesh won by 6 wickets
ICC Academy Oval-1, Dubai
Umpires: Jayaraman Madanagopal (Ind) and Izatullah Safi (Afg)
Player of the match: Ashiqur Rahman Shibli (Ban)

- Bangladesh won the toss and elected to field.

13 December 2023
9:30
Scorecard

United Arab Emirates; 320/7 (50 overs)	v	Japan; 213/4 (50 overs)
Aayan Afzal Khan 67* (41); Charles Hinze 2/42 (10 overs)		Koji Hardgrave Abe 69 (68); Harshit Seth 2/19 (7 overs)

United Arab Emirates won by 107 runs
ICC Academy Oval-2, Dubai
Umpires: Ahmed Shah Durrani (Afg) and Sanjay Gurung (Nep)
Player of the match: Aayan Afzal Khan (UAE)

- United Arab Emirates won the toss and elected to bat.

== Knockout stage ==
=== Bracket ===
Semi-finals
A1	Pakistan	182 (49.3)
B2	United Arab Emirates	193 (47.5)
B1	Bangladesh	189/6 (42.5)
A2	India	188 (42.4)

Final
SFW1	United Arab Emirates	87 (24.5)
SFW2	Bangladesh	282/8 (50)

=== Semi-final ===
==== 1st Semi-final ====
15 December 2023
9:30
Scorecard

United Arab Emirates; 193 (47.5 overs)	v	Pakistan; 182 (49.3 overs)
Aayan Afzal Khan 55 (57); Ubaid Shah 4/44 (9.5 overs)		Saad Baig 70 (53); Hardik Pai 1/35 (10 overs)

UAE won by 11 runs
ICC Academy Oval-1, Dubai
Umpires: Gazi Sohel (Ban) and Raveendra Wimalasiri (SL)
Player of the match: Aayan Afzal Khan (UAE)

- Pakistan won the toss and elected to field.

==== 2nd Semi-final ====
15 December 2023
9:30
Scorecard

India; 188 (42.4 overs)	v	Bangladesh; 189/6 (42.5 overs)
Murugan Abhishek 62 (74); Maruf Mridha 4/41 (10 overs)		Ariful Islam 94 (90); Naman Tiwari 3/35 (9 overs)

Bangladesh won by 4 wickets
ICC Academy Oval-2, Dubai
Umpires: Prageeth Rambukwella (SL) and Rashid Riaz (Pak)
Player of the match: Maruf Mridha (Ban)

- Bangladesh won the toss and elected to field.

=== Final ===
17 December 2023
9:30
Scorecard

Bangladesh; 282/8 (50 overs)	v	United Arab Emirates; 87 (24.5 overs)
Ashiqur Rahman Shibli 129 (149); Ayman Ahamed 4/52 (10 overs)		Dhuruv Parashar 25* (40); Maruf Mridha 3/29 (7 overs)

Bangladesh won by 195 runs
Dubai International Cricket Stadium, Dubai
Umpires: Jayaraman Madanagopal (Ind) and Asif Yaqoob (Pak)
Player of the match: Ashiqur Rahman Shibli (Ban)

- United Arab Emirates won the toss and elected to field.

== Statistics ==
=== Most runs ===
Player	Team	Matches	Runs	Highest score
Ashiqur Rahman Shibli	Bangladesh	5	378	129
Azan Awais	Pakistan	4	222	105
Ariful Islam	Bangladesh	5	184	94
Saad Baig	Pakistan	4	176	68
Shahzaib Khan	Pakistan	4	168	79

- Source: ESPNCricinfo

=== Most wickets ===
Player	Team	Matches	Wickets	Best bowling
Raj Limbani	India	4	12	7/13
Mohammad Zeeshan	Pakistan	4	11	6/19
Parvez Rahman Jibon	Bangladesh	5	10	4/26
Maruf Mridha	Bangladesh	4	10	4/41
Dhruv Parashar	United Arab Emirates	5	10	6/44

- Source: ESPNCricinfo
