= Mohammad Zeeshan =

Pakistani cricketer (born 2006)

Mohammad Zeeshan محمد ذیشان
Personal information
- Born: 15 April 2006 (age 20); Faisalabad, Punjab, Pakistan
- Height: 6 ft 8 in (203 cm)
- Batting: Right-handed
- Bowling: Right-arm medium-fast
- Role: Bowler

Domestic team information
- Years: Team
- 2021/22: Central Punjab
- 2025: Quetta Gladiators

Career statistics
Competition	FC	LA	T20
Matches	3	7	3
Runs scored	56	85	0
Batting average	14.00	42.50	0.00
100s/50s	0/0	0/1	0/0
Top score	25	53	0
Balls bowled	381	324	66
Wickets	12	10	1
Bowling average	24.41	33.30	112.00
5 wickets in innings	0	0	0
10 wickets in match	0	0	0
Best bowling	5/37	3/54	1/38
Catches/stumpings	1/–	0/–	0/–
- Source: Cricinfo, 9 April 2025

Mohammad Zeeshan (Punjabi, Urdu: محمد ذیشان; born 15 April 2006) is a Pakistani cricketer who plays for Central Punjab.

== Early life ==
Born into a Punjabi Jat family in Chak 58 JB Lillan village of Faisalabad District, Zeeshan is the youngest of three brothers. He developed an interest in cricket due to his elder brother and considers Shoaib Akhtar and Curtly Ambrose his role models.

== Domestic career ==
Zeeshan made his List-A debut for Central Punjab against Northern during the 2021-22 Pakistan Cup on 16 March 2022. Zeeshan played for the Pakistan under-19 cricket team during the 2021 ACC Under-19 Asia Cup. He was also named as a travelling reserve for Pakistan in the 2022 ICC Under-19 Cricket World Cup. He was selected in Pakistan's squad for the 2023 ACC Under-19 Asia Cup. Zeeshan was named in the squad for the 2024 Under-19 Cricket World Cup. During the 2024 Pakistan Super League players draft, he was picked by Peshawar Zalmi in the emerging category.

== International career ==
In December 2022, Zeeshan was added to the Pakistani Test squad along with Arafat Minhas and Basit Ali by the interim selection committee.
