= Tariq Ahmed =

Bangladeshi cricketer (born 1981)

Personal information
- Born: 1 January 1981 (age 45); Rangpur, Bangladesh
- Nickname: Ruben
- Batting: Right-handed
- Bowling: Right-arm off-spin

Domestic team information
- Years: Team
- 2008-09: Chittagong Division
- 2010-11: Barisal Division
- 2011-12 – 2015-16: Rangpur Division

Career statistics
Competition	FC	List A
Matches	47	24
Runs scored	2218	443
Batting average	29.57	21.09
100s/50s	2/13	0/1
Top score	102	79
Balls bowled	137	222
Wickets	1	5
Bowling average	87.00	32.20
5 wickets in innings	0	–
10 wickets in match	0	n/a
Best bowling	1/29	3/41
Catches/stumpings	30/–	4/–
- Source: Cricinfo, 31 December 2015

Tariq Ahmed (born 1 January 1981) is a former Bangladeshi first-class cricketer.

A middle-order batsman, Ahmed played for Chittagong Division in 2008-09 and Barisal Division in 2010–11, but when the Rangpur Division team was formed in 2011 he returned to Rangpur as captain of the new team. He was not reappointed captain after 2011–12, but remained with Rangpur Division as a player. His highest score was 102 for Rangpur Division in his last first-class match, against Dhaka Division in 2015–16.
