= Rangpur Cricket Garden =

Cricket ground in Rangpur, Bangladesh

Coordinates: 25°45′23.31″N 89°14′51.32″E

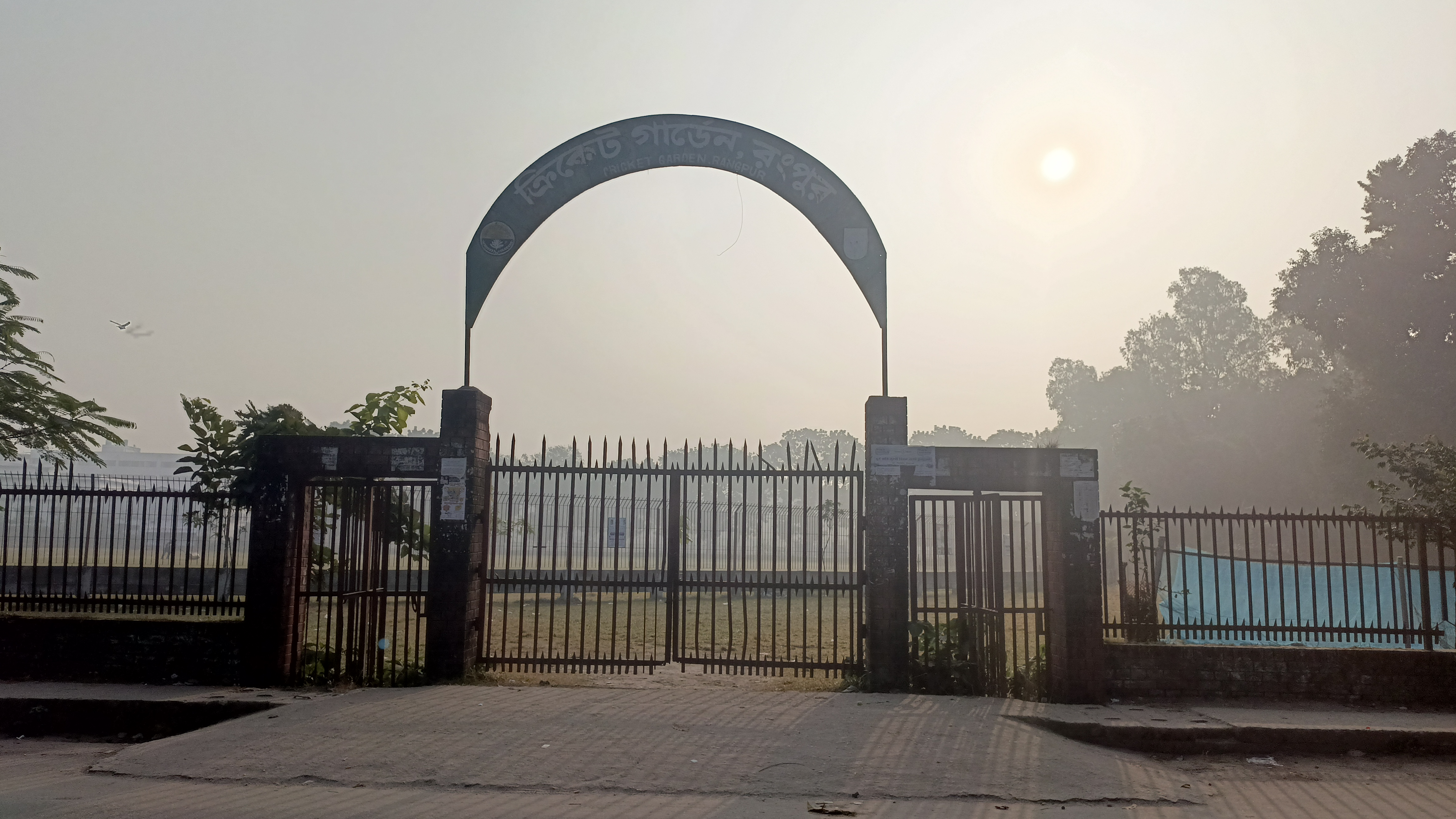
- Main Entrance
- Interactive map of Rangpur Cricket Garden
- Location: Rangpur College Road, Rangpur, Bangladesh
- Capacity: 10,000
- Surface: Grass

Rangpur Cricket Garden is a first-class cricket ground in Rangpur, Bangladesh. It is located on the south side of Rangpur Stadium.

The ground fell into neglect in the mid-2000s but has since been rejuvenated. Rangpur Division has played three first-class matches at the ground since 2012, and there have been three other first-class matches in the same period. Beginning in 2012–13, several matches in the annual national under-18 championships have been held there each season, including the final in 2015–16.

== See also ==
- Stadiums in Bangladesh
- List of cricket grounds in Bangladesh
