= Bangladeshi cricket team in South Africa in 2021–22 =

International cricket tour

	South Africa	Bangladesh
- Dates: 18 March – 12 April 2022
Captains	Dean Elgar (Tests); Temba Bavuma (ODIs)	Mominul Haque (Tests); Tamim Iqbal (ODIs)

Test series
- Result: South Africa won the 2-match series 2–0
Most runs	Dean Elgar (227)	Mahmudul Hasan Joy (141)
Most wickets	Keshav Maharaj (16)	Taijul Islam (9); Mehidy Hasan (9)
- Player of the series: Keshav Maharaj (SA)

One Day International series
- Results: Bangladesh won the 3-match series 2–1
Most runs	Rassie van der Dussen (98)	Tamim Iqbal (129)
Most wickets	Kagiso Rabada (6)	Taskin Ahmed (8)
- Player of the series: Taskin Ahmed (Ban)

The Bangladesh cricket team toured South Africa in March and April 2022 to play two Tests and three One Day International (ODI) matches. The Test series formed part of the 2021–2023 ICC World Test Championship, and the ODI series formed part of the inaugural 2020–2023 ICC Cricket World Cup Super League. On 9 February 2022, Cricket South Africa confirmed the schedule and venues for the series.

Bangladesh won the first ODI by 38 runs, recording their first win against the hosts in an international cricket match in South Africa. South Africa won the second ODI by seven wickets, with Kagiso Rabada taking his second five-wicket haul in an ODI match. Bangladesh won the third ODI by nine wickets, with Taskin Ahmed also taking a five-wicket haul. As a result, Bangladesh won the series 2–1, giving them their first ODI series win in South Africa.

South Africa won the first Test match by 220 runs. In the second innings, Keshav Maharaj took seven wickets for 32 runs, with Bangladesh being bowled out for 53 runs, their second-lowest total in Test cricket. All of Bangladesh's wickets were taken by spin bowling from Maharaj and Simon Harmer. It was the first time that just two bowlers had taken all ten wickets in an innings for South Africa in a Test match. It was also the first time in more than 100 years that zero deliveries were bowled by seam bowlers in a completed innings for South Africa.

On the morning of the fourth day of the second Test match, Sarel Erwee and Wiaan Mulder were replaced by Glenton Stuurman and Khaya Zondo as COVID-19 substitutes. It was the first time that COVID-19 substitutes had been used in Test cricket, with Khaya Zondo making his Test debut in the process. South Africa won the match by 332 runs, winning the series 2–0.

== Squads ==
Tests		ODIs	
South Africa	Bangladesh	South Africa	Bangladesh
Dean Elgar (c); Temba Bavuma (vc); Daryn Dupavillon; Sarel Erwee; Simon Harmer; Keshav Maharaj; Wiaan Mulder; Duanne Olivier; Keegan Petersen; Ryan Rickelton; Lutho Sipamla; Glenton Stuurman; Kyle Verreynne (wk); Lizaad Williams; Khaya Zondo	Mominul Haque (c); Khaled Ahmed; Taskin Ahmed; Yasir Ali; Litton Das (wk); ~~Shakib Al Hasan~~; Mahmudul Hasan Joy; Mehidy Hasan; Nurul Hasan (wk); Ebadot Hossain; Tamim Iqbal; Shadman Islam; Shohidul Islam; Shoriful Islam; Taijul Islam; Abu Jayed; Mushfiqur Rahim; Najmul Hossain Shanto	Temba Bavuma (c); Keshav Maharaj (vc); Quinton de Kock (wk); Zubayr Hamza; Marco Jansen; Janneman Malan; Aiden Markram; David Miller; Lungi Ngidi; Wayne Parnell; Andile Phehlukwayo; Dwaine Pretorius; Kagiso Rabada; Tabraiz Shamsi; Rassie van der Dussen; Kyle Verreynne	Tamim Iqbal (c); Khaled Ahmed; Nasum Ahmed; Taskin Ahmed; Yasir Ali; Litton Das; Mehidy Hasan; Shakib Al Hasan; Afif Hossain; Ebadot Hossain; Shoriful Islam; Mahmudul Hasan Joy; Mahmudullah; Mushfiqur Rahim (wk); Mustafizur Rahman; Najmul Hossain Shanto

Prior to the tour, Shakib Al Hasan had requested a break from international cricket, with the Bangladesh Cricket Board (BCB) initially agreeing to his request. However, after a meeting with the BCB's president, Nazmul Hassan, Shakib agreed to travel to South Africa. Shakib eventually missed the Test series, after several family members were admitted to hospital due to COVID-19. During the first Test, the BCB confirmed that both Taskin Ahmed and Shoriful Islam would return home to Bangladesh following the conclusion of the match due to injuries.

In March 2022, Cricket South Africa (CSA) agreed to allow their Test-playing cricketers to choose between the matches against Bangladesh or playing in the 2022 Indian Premier League (IPL), with a unanimous vote for them to play in the IPL. As a result, South Africa named a weakened squad for the Test matches, with Marco Jansen, Aiden Markram, Lungi Ngidi, Anrich Nortje, Kagiso Rabada and Rassie van der Dussen all playing in the IPL.

== ODI series ==
=== 1st ODI ===
18 March 2022
13:00 (D/N)
Scorecard

Bangladesh; 314/7 (50 overs)	v	South Africa; 276 (48.5 overs)
Shakib Al Hasan 77 (64); Keshav Maharaj 2/56 (10 overs)		Rassie van der Dussen 86 (98); Mehidy Hasan 4/61 (9 overs)

Bangladesh won by 38 runs
Centurion Park, Centurion
Umpires: Marais Erasmus (SA) and Bongani Jele (SA)
Player of the match: Shakib Al Hasan (Ban)

- South Africa won the toss and elected to field.
- World Cup Super League points: Bangladesh 10, South Africa 0.

=== 2nd ODI ===
20 March 2022
10:00
Scorecard

Bangladesh; 194/9 (50 overs)	v	South Africa; 195/3 (37.2 overs)
Afif Hossain 72 (107); Kagiso Rabada 5/39 (10 overs)		Quinton de Kock 62 (41); Afif Hossain 1/15 (5 overs)

South Africa won by 7 wickets
Wanderers Stadium, Johannesburg
Umpires: Marais Erasmus (SA) and Adrian Holdstock (SA)
Player of the match: Kagiso Rabada (SA)

- Bangladesh won the toss and elected to bat.
- World Cup Super League points: South Africa 10, Bangladesh 0.

=== 3rd ODI ===
23 March 2022
13:00 (D/N)
Scorecard

South Africa; 154 (37 overs)	v	Bangladesh; 156/1 (26.3 overs)
Janneman Malan 39 (56); Taskin Ahmed 5/35 (9 overs)		Tamim Iqbal 87* (82); Keshav Maharaj 1/36 (7 overs)

Bangladesh won by 9 wickets
Centurion Park, Centurion
Umpires: Marais Erasmus (SA) and Allahudien Paleker (SA)
Player of the match: Taskin Ahmed (Ban)

- South Africa won the toss and elected to bat.
- World Cup Super League points: Bangladesh 10, South Africa 0.

== Test series ==
=== 1st Test ===
31 March – 4 April 2022
Scorecard

South Africa	v	Bangladesh
367 (121 overs); Temba Bavuma 93 (190); Khaled Ahmed 4/92 (25 overs)		298 (115.5 overs); Mahmudul Hasan Joy 137 (326); Simon Harmer 4/103 (40 overs)
204 (74 overs); Dean Elgar 64 (102); Ebadot Hossain 3/40 (13 overs)		53 (19 overs); Najmul Hossain Shanto 26 (52); Keshav Maharaj 7/32 (10 overs)

South Africa won by 220 runs
Kingsmead Cricket Ground, Durban
Umpires: Marais Erasmus (SA) and Adrian Holdstock (SA)
Player of the match: Keshav Maharaj (SA)

- Bangladesh won the toss and elected to field.
- Ryan Rickelton and Lizaad Williams (SA) both made their Test debuts.
- Temba Bavuma (SA) played in his 50th Test.
- Mominul Haque (Ban) played in his 50th Test.
- Mahmudul Hasan Joy scored his first century in Tests, and he also became the first batter for Bangladesh to score a century against South Africa in Tests.
- World Test Championship points: South Africa 12, Bangladesh 0.

=== 2nd Test ===
8–12 April 2022 (Note: While five days of play were scheduled for each Test, the second Test reached a result in four days.)
Scorecard

South Africa	v	Bangladesh
453 (136.2 overs); Keshav Maharaj 84 (95); Taijul Islam 6/135 (50 overs)		217 (74.2 overs); Mushfiqur Rahim 51 (136); Wiaan Mulder 3/25 (13 overs)
176/6d (39.5 overs); Sarel Erwee 41 (66); Taijul Islam 3/67 (15 overs)		80 (23.3 overs); Litton Das 27 (33); Keshav Maharaj 7/40 (12 overs)

South Africa won by 332 runs
St George's Park, Port Elizabeth
Umpires: Marais Erasmus (SA) and Allahudien Paleker (SA)
Player of the match: Keshav Maharaj (SA)

- South Africa won the toss and elected to bat.
- Taijul Islam (Ban) took his 150th wicket in Tests.
- Glenton Stuurman and Khaya Zondo replaced Sarel Erwee and Wiaan Mulder as COVID-19 substitutes at the start of day 4 for South Africa, with Zondo making his Test debut.
- Keshav Maharaj (SA) took his 150th wicket in Tests.
- World Test Championship points: South Africa 12, Bangladesh 0.
