= Saif Hasan =

Indian playwright and director

Saif Hyder Hasan is an Indian playwright, director and producer.

== Notable work ==
- Aaine ke Sau Tukde, playwright, director, producer
- Ek Mulaqat 2014 writer, director, producer
- Gardish Mein Taare playwright, director, producer
