= Ashiqur Rahman (cricketer, born 2005) =

Bangladeshi cricketer

Ashiqur Rahman Shibli
Personal information
- Born: 1 December 2005 (age 20); Faridpur, Dhaka Division, Bangladesh
- Nickname: Shibli
- Batting: Right-handed
- Role: Batter, wicket-keeper

Domestic team information
- Years: Team
- 2023–24: Gazi Tyres Cricket Academy
- 2024–25: Dhaka Division
- 2024–25: Dhanmondi SC
- 2025–26: Legends of Rupganj

Career statistics
Competition	FC	LA	T20
Matches	15	27	10
Runs scored	968	783	174
Batting average	46.09	31.32	17.40
100s/50s	3/5	1/4	0/1
Top score	129	119	60
Catches/stumpings	34/1	7/0	3/0
Medal record
Men's Cricket
Representing Bangladesh
ACC U-19 Asia Cup
Winner	2023 UAE
- Source: Cricinfo, 27 May 2026

Ashiqur Rahman Shibli (Bengali: আশিকুর রহমান শিবলী; born 1 December 2005) is a Bangladeshi cricketer from Faridpur.

== Domestic career ==
Shibli made his List A debut for South Zone in the BCL 1-Day tournament, scoring 60. Later that season, playing for Gazi Tyres Cricket Academy in first round of the 2023–24 Dhaka Premier Division Cricket League, he scored 89 not out against Sheikh Jamal Dhanmondi Club.

In his second first-class match, playing for Dhaka Division in the 2024–25 National Cricket League in October 2024, he made 129 against Rangpur Division.

== International career ==
=== U19 ===
An opening batsman and occasional wicket-keeper, Shibli was one of Bangladesh's leading players when they won the 2023 ACC Under-19 Asia Cup, and was named player of the series. He scored 129 in the final against United Arab Emirates, winning the player of the match award.
