= Amite Hasan =

Bangladeshi cricketer (born 2001)

Personal information
- Born: 15 September 2001 (age 25); Narayanganj, Bangladesh
- Batting: Right-handed
- Role: Wicket-keeper

International information
- National side: Bangladesh (2026–present)
- Test debut (cap 111): 28 June 2026 v Zimbabwe
- Last Test: 28 June 2026 v Zimbabwe

Domestic team information
- Years: Team
- 2019–present: Sylhet Division
- 2019–2021, 2023–2024: Shinepukur
- 2022: Khelaghar SKS
- 2025: Agrani Bank

Career statistics
| Competition | FC | LA | T20 |
|---|---|---|---|
| Matches | 49 | 59 | 13 |
| Runs scored | 3,650 | 2,068 | 226 |
| Batting average | 49.32 | 39.01 | 20.54 |
| 100s/50s | 11/17 | 6/8 | 0/1 |
| Top score | 213 | 115 | 52 |
| Catches/stumpings | 61/2 | 36/5 | 4/1 |
- Source: Cricinfo, 25 April 2026

Amite Hasan (Bengali: অমিত হাসান; born 15 September 2001) is a Bangladeshi cricketer. He made his List A debut for Shinepukur in the 2018–19 Dhaka Premier Division Cricket League on 14 March 2019. He was named the player of the match for scoring a century for Sylhet Division on his first-class debut on 9 November 2019, in the 2019–20 National Cricket League. He made his Twenty20 debut on 4 June 2021, for Shinepukur Cricket Club in the 2021 Dhaka Premier Division Twenty20 Cricket League.

== Domestic career ==
=== Dhaka Premier Division Cricket League ===
He was signed by the Shinepukur for the 2018–19 DPL. He made his debut against Dhanmondi Sports Club on 14 March 2019. In his debut match he scored only 4 runs off 16 deliveries and his team was bowled out for just 94 runs. He had a poor season as he scored only 83 runs in an average of 16.60 in 6 innings with the best of 43.

He was retained by Shinepukur for the 2019–20 DPL but didn't got the chance to play as the tournament was postponed due to COVID-19 pandemic.

In the 2021–22 DPL he played for the Khelaghar. Despite his team's relegation he personally had a wonderful season as he was the 6th highest run scorer of the tournament. He scored 575 runs in 12 innings in an average of 57.50 including 2 centuries and 3 half centuries.

In the next season he returned to his old team Shinepukur. He scored 496 runs in 12 innings with an average of 41.33 including 2 centuries and 1 half century.

In 2024 DPL he played for the Shinepukur and scored 183 runs in 6 innings with an average of 36.60 including 1 century and 1 half century.

He was signed by the Agrani Bank for the 2025 DPL. He scored 614 runs in 16 innings with an average of 38.37 including 1 century and 3 half centuries and was the fourth highest run scorer of the tournament.

=== National Cricket League ===
Amite made his first class debut for Sylhet Division in 2019–20 National Cricket League against Dhaka Metropolis. He scored a century in the first innings of his debut match. In his debut season he scored 194 runs in 3 innings with an average of 64.66 including 1 century and 1 half century.

In the next season Amit just managed to score 104 runs in 4 innings with an average of 26.00 including 2 fifties. His highest score was 66 against Khulna Division.

In NCL 2021–22 he had an impressive season as he scored 590 runs in 11 innings with an average of 59.00 including 2 centuries and 2 half centuries. He was the second highest run scorer of that season.

He scored only 234 runs in 9 innings with an average of 29.25 including 2 fifties in the NCL 2022.

He scored only 87 runs in 2023–24 NCL in 4 innings with an average of 21.75 with the best of 38.

He made a strong comeback in NCL 2024. He scored his maiden double century in a league stage match against Khulna Division. He scored 213 runs off 455 deliveries hitting 18 fours and 1 six. He finished the season as the highest run scorer of the season with 785 runs in 12 innings including 2 centuries and 5 half centuries in an average of 78.50.

=== National Cricket League Twenty20 ===
He was selected to play for Sylhet Division in the 2024–25 NCL Twenty20. He had a poor tournament as he scored only 40 runs in 5 innings with an average of 8.00. His top score was 26.

In the following season Amite scored 182 runs in 5 innings in an average of 36.40 including 1 fifty, which was also his maiden T20 fifty.

== International career ==
Although he did not make his international debut, Amite Hasan earned his maiden call-up to the Bangladesh Test squad in April 2026 for the series against Pakistan. He made his Test match debut for Bangladesh against Zimbabwe on 28 June 2026.
