= Golam Kibria =

Bangladeshi cricketer (born 1989)

Personal information
- Born: 28 August 1989 (age 37); Barisal, Bangladesh
- Source: ESPNcricinfo, 28 September 2016

Golam Kibria (born 28 August 1989) is a Bangladeshi cricketer. He played one first-class match for Barisal Division in 2010. He was part of Bangladesh's squad for the 2008 Under-19 Cricket World Cup.
