= Abdul Gaffar (cricketer) =

Bangladeshi cricketer (born 1993)

Personal information
- Born: 5 October 1993 (age 33); Rajshahi, Bangladesh
- Batting: Right-handed
- Bowling: Right-arm offbreak
- Role: All-rounder

Career statistics
Competition	FC	LA
Matches	1	7
Runs scored	7	40
Batting average	7.00	13.33
100s/50s	0/0	0/0
Top score	7	21
Balls bowled	66	360
Wickets	0	6
Bowling average	–	43.00
5 wickets in innings	–	0
10 wickets in match	–	0
Best bowling	–	2/14
Catches/stumpings	1/–	6/–
- Source: ESPNcricinfo, 10 August 2021

Abdul Gaffar (born 5 October 1993) is a Bangladeshi cricketer. He made his List A debut for Shinepukur Cricket Club in the 2017–18 Dhaka Premier Division Cricket League on 8 March 2018. He made his first-class debut for Rajshahi Division in the 2018–19 National Cricket League on 15 October 2018. He made his Twenty20 debut on 5 June 2021, for Brothers Union in the 2021 Dhaka Premier Division Twenty20 Cricket League.
