= Parvez Rahman Jibon =

Bangladeshi cricketer

Personal information
- Born: 8 October 2006 (age 20); Khulna
- Batting: Right handed
- Bowling: Right arm Offbreak
- Role: Bowler
- Source: Cricinfo

Parvez Rahman Jibon (Bengali: পারভেজ রহমান জীবন; born 8 October 2006) is a Bangladeshi cricketer

== Domestic career ==
Jibon made his List A debut for Gazi Group Cricketers in the 2023–24 Dhaka Premier Division Cricket League on 12 March 2024

He made his first-class debut on 19 October 2024 for Khulna Division in the 2024–25 National Cricket League

He made his Twenty20 debut on 18 December 2024 for Khulna Division in the 2024–25 National Cricket League Twenty20

== International career ==
=== U19 ===
In January 2024, Jibon was named in Bangladesh's squad for the 2024 Under-19 Cricket World Cup.
