= Mim Mosaddeak =

Bangladeshi cricketer

Personal information
- Full name: Mim Mosaddeak
- Relatives: Sanjida Islam (wife)

Domestic team information
- Years: Team
- 2012-Present: Rangpur Cricket Academy (squad no. Rangpur)
- 2017-Present: Rangpur Division
- Source: Cricinfo, 2 October 2017

Mim Mosaddeak is a Bangladeshi cricketer. He made his first-class debut for Rangpur Division in the 2017–18 National Cricket League on 29 September 2017. He plays as a right-handed batsman and made his List A debut on 14 April 2022, for Gazi Group cricketers in the 2021–22 Dhaka Premier Division Cricket League.

== Personal life ==
On 21 October 2020, he married cricketer Sanjida Islam, who plays for the Bangladesh women's national cricket team.
