= Asadulla Al Galib =

Bangladeshi cricketer (born 1998)

Personal information
- Born: 26 December 1998 (age 27)
- Source: ESPNcricinfo, 12 November 2019

Asadulla Al Galib (Bengali: আসাদুল্লাহ আল গালিব; born 26 December 1998) is a Bangladeshi cricketer. He made his first-class debut on 9 November 2019, for Sylhet Division in the 2019–20 National Cricket League. He made his List A debut on 18 March 2023, for Brothers Union against Prime Bank Cricket Club in the 2022–23 Dhaka Premier Division Cricket League.
