= Mahfijul Islam =

Bangladeshi cricketer

Personal information
- Full name: Mohammed Mahfijul Islam
- Born: 10 March 2004 (age 22); Narayanganj, Bangladesh
- Nickname: Robin
- Batting: Right-handed
- Bowling: Right-arm Legbreak
- Role: Opening batter

International information
- National side: Bangladesh (2026–)
- Only Test (cap 112): 15 November 2026 v South Africa

Domestic team information
- Years: Team
- 2022–2025: Dhaka Metropolis
- 2025–present: Mymensingh Division
- 2023–present: Agrani Bank
- 2025/26: Chattogram Royals
- Source: Cricinfo, 15 November 2026

Mohammed Mahfijul Islam (born 10 March 2004), also known as Robin, is a Bangladeshi first-class, List A and Twenty20 cricketer and former international cricketer. Mahfijul is a right-handed batsman and a right-arm Legbreak.

In December 2021, Mahfijul was named in Bangladesh's under-19 squad for 2021 ACC Under-19 Asia Cup and 2022 Under-19 Cricket World Cup.

== International career ==
In November 2026, Mahfijul was added to Bangladesh's Test squad for their series South Africa. He made his Test debut for Bangladesh against South Africa on 15 November 2026.
