= Mahmudul Hasan Joy =

Bangladeshi cricketer (born 2000)

Mahmudul Hasan
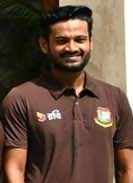

Personal information
- Full name: Mahmudul Hasan Joy
- Born: 13 November 2000 (age 25); Faridganj, Chandpur, Bangladesh
- Height: 179 cm (5 ft 10 in)
- Batting: Right-handed
- Bowling: Right-arm off break
- Role: Opening-Batter

International information
- National side: Bangladesh (2021–present)
- Test debut (cap 99): 4 December 2021 v Pakistan
- Last Test: 19 November 2025 v Ireland
- T20I debut (cap 82): 4 October 2023 v Malaysia
- Last T20I: 7 October 2023 v Pakistan

Career statistics
Competition	Test	T20I	FC	LA
Matches	20	3	47	52
Runs scored	1,040	5	2,703	1545
Batting average	28.10	2.50	32.96	35.93
100s/50s	2/5	0/0	6/14	3/10
Top score	171	5	171	123
Balls bowled	13	2	439	227
Wickets	0	0	11	5
Bowling average	–	–	22.54	31.80
5 wickets in innings	0	1	1	0
10 wickets in match	0	0	0	0
Best bowling	–	–	5/21	2/21
Catches/stumpings	10/–	2/–	26/–	28/–
Medal record
Men's Cricket
Representing Bangladesh
ICC U-19 World Cup
Winner	2020 South Africa
Asian Games
Bronze medal – third place	2022 Hangzhou	Team
- Source: ESPNcricinfo, 24 November 2025

Mahmudul Hasan Joy (born 13 November 2000) is a Bangladeshi cricketer. He made his List A debut for Bangladesh Krira Shikkha Protishtan in the 2018–19 Dhaka Premier Division Cricket League on 8 March 2019.

== Early life ==
Mahmudul Hasan Joy was born on 13 November 2000 in the West Larua village of Faridganj sub-district in the Chandpur district. He is the third of four children of Abdul Barek and Hasina Begum. Joy started his journey with cricket from Clemon Chandpur cricket academy. In 2014, he got admitted in Bangladesh Krira Shikkha Protishtan.

== Youth and domestic career ==
In December 2019, he was named in Bangladesh's squad for the 2020 Under-19 Cricket World Cup. In the second Super League semi-final of the tournament, against New Zealand, he scored a century in Bangladesh's six-wicket win.

He made his Twenty20 debut on 6 December 2020, for Gazi Group Chattogram in the 2020–21 Bangabandhu T20 Cup. In February 2021, he was selected in the Bangladesh Emerging squad for their home series against the Ireland Wolves. He made his first-class debut on 26 February 2021, for the Bangladesh Emerging team against Ireland Wolves.

== International career ==
In November 2021, he was named in Bangladesh's Test squad for their series against Pakistan. He made his Test debut on 4 December 2021, against Pakistan. In January 2022, he scored his first Test fifty against New Zealand at Bay Oval in the first match of the series. However, he missed the remainder of the series due to a finger injury, which he picked on the fourth day of first Test match.

In February 2022, he was named in Bangladesh's One Day International (ODI) squad for their series against Afghanistan. In March 2022, he was named in Bangladesh's ODI squad for their series against South Africa.

In April 2022, in the first match against South Africa, Joy scored his first century in Test cricket. He also became the first batter for Bangladesh to score a century against South Africa in Tests.

In November 2023, he was selected in Bangladesh's squad for the Test series against New Zealand. He scored 86 runs in the first innings of the first test in Sylhet.

== International centuries ==
Test centuries by Mahmudul Hasan Joy
No.	Runs	Against	Venue	H/A	Date	Result	Ref
1	137	South Africa	Kingsmead Cricket Ground, Durban	Away	2 April 2022	Lost	
2	171	Ireland	Sylhet International Cricket Stadium, Sylhet	Home	12 November 2025	Won	
