= Rangpur Division cricket team =

Personnel
- Captain: Akbar Ali
- Coach: n/a
- Owner: Bangladesh Cricket Board

Team information
- Founded: 2011
- Home ground: Rangpur Cricket Garden
- Capacity: 10,000

History
- National Cricket League wins: 3
- NCL T20 wins: 2

The Rangpur Division cricket team is a Bangladeshi first-class team representing the Rangpur Division, the northernmost of the eight administrative regions in Bangladesh. The team competes in the National Cricket League (NCL). Their home venue is the Rangpur Cricket Garden in Rangpur City. Rangpur are a relatively recent addition to the NCL, having joined in 2011–12, and won their first title in 2014–15. The equivalent team in the Bangladesh Premier League (BPL) is the Rangpur Riders.

== Honours ==
- National Cricket League (3 titles): 2014–15, 2022–23, 2025–26

== History ==
Rangpur Division was formed on 25 January 2010, as Bangladesh's seventh administrative division. Before that, the territory had been the northern eight districts of the Rajshahi Division and the new Rangpur division consists of the same eight districts. As the National Cricket League has always been based on the administrative divisions, it was decided to invite a Rangpur team and so increase the competition's membership from the existing six. In order to keep the membership an even number, the NCL also invited Dhaka Metropolis to join. The two new teams made their NCL debuts in the 2011–12 season. In the 2014–15 season, Rangpur won their first NCL championship in a last-ball finish on the final day of the competition. They were clear winners in 2022–23.

At the end of the 2024–25 competition Rangpur Division had played a total of 85 first-class matches with 25 wins, 19 defeats and 41 draws.

== Results in National Cricket League ==
- 2011–12: two wins in seven matches, finished sixth
- 2012–13: one win in seven matches, finished seventh
- 2013–14: three wins in seven matches, finished third
- 2014–15: four wins in seven matches, champions
- 2015–16: no wins in six matches, finished fourth (last) in Tier 1
- 2016–17: two wins in six matches, finished first in Tier 2
- 2017–18: no wins in six matches (all matches drawn), finished second in Tier 1
- 2018–19: one win in six matches, finished second in Tier 1
- 2019–20: one win in six matches, finished third in Tier 1
- 2020–21: one win in two matches, third in Tier 1 before the competition was abandoned owing to COVID-19
- 2021–22: two wins in six matches, finished second in Tier 1
- 2022–23: three wins in six matches, champions
- 2023–24: one win in six matches, finished fourth (last) in Tier 1
- 2024–25: two wins in seven matches, finished equal third
- 2025–26: three wins in seven matches, champions

== Players ==
Rangpur Division has had four Test players: Nasir Hossain, Naeem Islam senior, Sajidul Islam and Suhrawadi Shuvo. Team captains have been Tariq Ahmed (2011–12), Suhrawadi Shuvo (2012–13 and 2013–14), Sajidul Islam (2014–15) and Dhiman Ghosh (2015–16).

The two highest scores for Rangpur Division were made in the same innings: Dhiman Ghosh made 183 and Alauddin Babu 180, and they shared a fifth-wicket partnership of 322, which is also Rangpur Division's highest partnership for any wicket, in the match against Chittagong Division in 2011–12. The best bowling figures are 7 for 64 by Sanjit Saha, at the age of 17, against Khulna Division in 2015–16.
