= 2018–19 Bangladesh Cricket League =

Cricket tournament

- Dates: 21 November – 27 December 2018
- Administrator: Bangladesh Cricket Board
- Cricket format: First-class
- Tournament format: Round-robin
- Champions: South Zone (4th title)
- Participants: 4
- Matches: 12
- Most runs: Anamul Haque (658)
- Most wickets: Abdur Razzak (34)

The 2018–19 Bangladesh Cricket League was the seventh edition of the Bangladesh Cricket League, a first-class cricket competition. It was held in Bangladesh, starting on 21 November 2018 and concluding on 27 December 2018. South Zone were the defending champions. South Zone retained their title, after they beat North Zone by nine wickets in their final match.

Prior to the start of the tournament, a players' draft took place. The third round match between Central Zone and East Zone finished as a draw, under controversial circumstances. The umpires called off the game due to bad light, eight minutes after the scheduled close, with East Zone six runs short of the target to win.

== Points table ==
Team	Pld	W	L	D	A	Pts
South Zone	6	2	1	3	0	31.88
East Zone	6	1	0	5	0	29.14
Central Zone	6	1	2	3	0	23.37
North Zone	6	0	1	5	0	18.61

- 2018–19 Champions

== Fixtures ==
=== Round 1 ===
21–24 November 2018
Scorecard

Central Zone	v	South Zone
282 (74.5 overs); Abdul Mazid 141* (219); Al-Amin Hossain 3/65 (17 overs)		281 (87.1 overs); Fazle Mahmud 94 (194); Mosharraf Hossain 4/53 (21 overs)
264 (76.4 overs); Litton Das 84 (95); Mahedi Hasan 5/72 (24.4 overs)		188 (49.5 overs); Shahriar Nafees 54 (74); Shuvagata Hom 5/53 (14.5 overs)

Central Zone won by 77 runs
Sylhet International Cricket Stadium, Sylhet
Umpires: Imran Parvez and Nadir Shah
Player of the match: Abdul Mazid (Central Zone)

- South Zone won the toss and elected to field.
- Robiul Hoque (Central Zone) made his first-class debut.
- Abdul Mazid (Central Zone) scored his 10th century in first-class cricket.
- Mahedi Hasan (South Zone) took his maiden five-wicket haul in first-class cricket.

21–24 November 2018
Scorecard

North Zone	v	East Zone
445 (112.1 overs); Naeem Islam 137 (246); Hasan Mahmud 4/84 (24.1 overs)		443 (125.3 overs); Yasir Ali 94 (129); Ebadot Hossain 3/87 (26 overs)
270/4 (45.3 overs); Farhad Hossain 103* (128); Abu Jayed 2/72 (13.3 overs)

Match drawn
Shahid Kamruzzaman Stadium, Rajshahi
Umpires: Tanvir Ahmed and Gazi Sohel
Player of the match: Naeem Islam (North Zone)

- East Zone won the toss and elected to field.

=== Round 2 ===
28 November–3 December 2018
Scorecard

East Zone	v	South Zone
473 (137.2 overs); Shamsur Rahman 153 (228); Abdur Razzak 5/171 (48.2 overs)		258 (81.1 overs); Mahedi Hasan 86 (121); Enamul Haque 4/121 (24.1 overs)
		377/5 (115 overs) (f/o); Anamul Haque 133 (253); Afif Hossain 2/83 (26 overs)

Match drawn
Shahid Kamruzzaman Stadium, Rajshahi
Umpires: Mahfuzur Rahman and Nadir Shah
Player of the match: Shamsur Rahman (East Zone)

- South Zone won the toss and elected to field.

28 November–3 December 2018
Scorecard

Central Zone	v	North Zone
220 (62.5 overs); Abdul Mazid 76 (145); Ebadot Hossain 6/51 (17.5 overs)		255 (81.4 overs); Mizanur Rahman 81 (95); Shohidul Islam 6/64 (21.4 overs)
318 (89.4 overs); Mosaddek Hossain 104 (160); Mohor Sheikh 5/69 (23.4 overs)		255/9 (80.3 overs); Sunzamul Islam 92 (227); Abu Hider 6/86 (21 overs)

Match drawn
Shaheed Chandu Stadium, Bogra
Umpires: Morshed Ali Khan and Masudur Rahman
Player of the match: Ebadot Hossain (North Zone)

- North Zone won the toss and elected to field.
- Shohidul Islam (Central Zone) took his maiden five-wicket haul in first-class cricket.
- Ebadot Hossain (North Zone) took his maiden ten-wicket match haul in first-class cricket.

=== Round 3 ===
5–8 December 2018
Scorecard

South Zone	v	North Zone
329 (108.4 overs); Raqibul Hasan 79 (146); Sunzamul Islam 5/87 (36.4 overs)		394 (171.1 overs); Junaid Siddique 112 (307); Abdur Razzak 6/126 (55.1 overs)
248/5 (64 overs); Anamul Haque 66 (104); Ebadot Hossain 2/27 (9 overs)

Match drawn
Zahur Ahmed Chowdhury Stadium, Chittagong
Umpires: Morshed Ali Khan and Nadir Shah
Player of the match: Junaid Siddique (North Zone)

- North Zone won the toss and elected to field.
- Rishad Hossain (North Zone) made his first-class debut.

5–8 December 2018
Scorecard

Central Zone	v	East Zone
118 (55 overs); Sharifullah 23 (24); Farhad Reza 7/32 (16 overs)		186 (52.5 overs); Mahmudul Hasan 41 (101); Shohidul Islam 5/62 (20 overs)
393 (95.4 overs); Marshall Ayub 70 (92); Mohammad Ashraful 4/34 (11.4 overs)		320/7 (97.2 overs); Mahmudul Hasan 135 (242); Shohidul Islam 3/73 (24.2 overs)

Match drawn
Shaheed Chandu Stadium, Bogra
Umpires: Mahfuzur Rahman and Moniruzzaman
Player of the match: Shohidul Islam (Central Zone)

- East Zone won the toss and elected to field.

=== Round 4 ===
11–14 December 2018
Scorecard

East Zone	v	North Zone
466 (120.1 overs); Rony Talukdar 185 (245); Sunzamul Islam 5/115 (36.1 overs)		377 (120.3 overs); Naeem Islam 100 (243); Abu Jayed 6/74 (26.3 overs)
362/4d (75.3 overs); Mominul Haque 194 (190); Sunzamul Islam 3/122 (28 overs)		116/1 (16 overs); Junaid Siddique 51* (46); Taijul Islam 1/33 (5 overs)

Match drawn
Shahid Kamruzzaman Stadium, Rajshahi
Umpires: Akteruzzaman and Nadir Shah
Player of the match: Rony Talukdar (East Zone)

- North Zone won the toss and elected to field.

11–14 December 2018
Scorecard

Central Zone	v	South Zone
261 (97.4 overs); Taibur Rahman 68 (137); Mahedi Hasan 3/50 (25.4 overs)		397 (105.2 overs); Anamul Haque 77 (118); Arafat Sunny 4/122 (35 overs)
269 (106.3 overs); Shuvagata Hom 71 (149); Kamrul Islam Rabbi 4/59 (17.3 overs)		134/3 (32.2 overs); Anamul Haque 86* (101); Shuvagata Hom 2/21 (6 overs)

South Zone won by 7 wickets
Zahur Ahmed Chowdhury Stadium, Chittagong
Umpires: Sharfuddoula and Imran Parvez
Player of the match: Mahedi Hasan (South Zone)

- South Zone won the toss and elected to field.

=== Round 5 ===
17–20 December 2018
Scorecard

East Zone	v	South Zone
262/8d (83.4 overs); Yasir Ali 70 (134); Al-Amin Hossain 3/26 (14 overs)		175/8d (65 overs); Fazle Mahmud 69 (170); Taijul Islam 2/32 (15 overs)
159/5d (21.5 overs); Rony Talukdar 58 (39); Mahedi Hasan 3/60 (6.5 overs)		132/5 (28 overs); Mahedi Hasan 39* (49); Farhad Reza 2/37 (6 overs)

Match drawn
Shaheed Chandu Stadium, Bogra
Umpires: Shafiuddin Ahmed and Nadir Shah
Player of the match: Fazle Mahmud (South Zone)

- South Zone won the toss and elected to field.
- No play was possible on day 1 due to rain.

17–20 December 2018
Scorecard

North Zone	v	Central Zone
146 (56 overs); Junaid Siddique 35 (56); Arafat Sunny 3/38 (18 overs)		294 (85.5 overs); Saif Hassan 75 (160); Sunzamul Islam 6/103 (35.5 overs)
113/3 (30 overs); Junaid Siddique 47 (79); Taibur Rahman 1/12 (3 overs)

Match drawn
Shahid Kamruzzaman Stadium, Rajshahi
Umpires: Mahfuzur Rahman and Moniruzzaman
Player of the match: Sunzamul Islam (North Zone)

- North Zone won the toss and elected to bat.
- No play was possible on day 1 due to rain.

=== Round 6 ===
24–27 December 2018
Scorecard

North Zone	v	South Zone
293 (83.4 overs); Ariful Haque 98 (151); Abdur Razzak 7/69 (29.4 overs)		541 (125.3 overs); Anamul Haque 180 (314); Sunzamul Islam 6/158 (38.3 overs)
280 (82.2 overs); Junaid Siddique 77 (144); Abdur Razzak 5/75 (32.2 overs)		35/1 (7.1 overs); Anamul Haque 20* (20); Dhiman Ghosh 1/10 (1.1 overs)

South Zone won by 9 wickets
Zahur Ahmed Chowdhury Stadium, Chittagong
Umpires: Tanvir Ahmed and Morshed Ali Khan
Player of the match: Abdur Razzak (South Zone)

- North Zone won the toss and elected to bat.

24–27 December 2018
Scorecard

East Zone	v	Central Zone
425 (88.5 overs); Mahmudul Hasan 94 (133); Taskin Ahmed 4/96 (19.5 overs)		224 (72.1 overs); Mosaddek Hossain 57 (89); Taijul Islam 6/92 (31 overs)
254/3d (43 overs); Yasir Ali 101* (109); Shahadat Hossain 1/19 (4 overs)		134 (42.2 overs); Najmul Hossain Shanto 36 (60); Nayeem Hasan 8/47 (20 overs)

East Zone won by 321 runs
Sylhet International Cricket Stadium, Sylhet
Umpires: Nadir Shah and Gazi Sohel
Player of the match: Nayeem Hasan (East Zone)

- East Zone won the toss and elected to bat.
