= 2023–24 BCL 1-Day =

Cricket tournament

2023–24 Bangladesh Cricket League One Day
- Dates: 24 – 30 December 2023
- Administrator: Bangladesh Cricket Board
- Cricket format: List A
- Tournament format(s): Round-robin and Final
- Host: Bangladesh
- Champions: North Zone (2nd title)
- Runners-up: East Zone
- Participants: 4
- Matches: 7
- Player of the series: Mahidul Islam Ankon (Central Zone)
- Most runs: Mahidul Islam Ankon (Central Zone) (236)
- Most wickets: Nahid Rana (North Zone) (7)

The 2023–24 Bangladesh Cricket League One Day was the 3rd edition of the BCL 1-Day, a List A cricket competition in Bangladesh. It was held from 24 to 30 December 2023. The tournament was followed by the first-class 2023–24 Bangladesh Cricket League. Central Zone were the champion of the previous tournament, having win against South Zone by 3 runs in the final. North Zone defeated East Zone by 4 wickets in final and became two-time champion of BCL 1-Day.

== Squads ==
As of 21 December 2023

Central Zone	East Zone	North Zone	South Zone
Naim Sheikh; Jishan Alam; Shadman Islam (c); Saif Hassan; Ariful Islam; Shuvagata Hom; Mahidul Islam Ankon (wk); Mahfuzur Rahman Rabby; Abu Hider; Md Anamul Haque; Ripon Mondol; Abdul Majid; Mehedi Hasan Rana; Jehadul Hoque Jihan	Irfan Shukkur (c) (wk); Shykat Ali; Nasum Ahmed; Yasir Ali; Parvez Hossain Emon; Rejaur Rahman Raja; Nayeem Hasan; Khaled Ahmed; Mominul Haque; Zakir Hasan; Shahadat Hossain; Mehidy Hasan Shohag; Ifran Hossain; Mahmudul Hasan Joy	Akbar Ali (c); Abdullah Al Mamun; Nahid Rana; Pritom Kumar (wk); Sabbir Rahman; Amite Hasan; Aminul Islam; Nahidul Islam; Yeasin Arafat; Chowdhury Md Rizwan; Shahidul Islam; Taibur Rahman; Habibur Rahman; Taijul Islam	Mohammad Mithun (c); Fazle Mahmud; Kamrul Islam Rabbi; Mosaddek Hossain; Marshal Ayub; Moin Khan; Prantik Nawrose Nabil; Sumon Khan; Nurul Hasan; Arifur Rahman Shibli; Sohag Gazi; Mukidul Islam Mugdho; Hasan Murad; Wasi Siddiquee

== Venues ==
Venues of BCL ONE DAY 2023

== Points table ==
Team	Pld	W	L	NR	Pts	NRR
East Zone	3	2	1	0	4	0.704
North Zone (C)	3	2	1	0	4	0.661
Central Zone	3	2	1	0	4	-0.692
South Zone	3	0	3	0	0	-0.499

- Advance to the final

== Fixture ==
=== Round 1 ===
Match 1
24 December 2023
9:00 am
Scorecard

Central Zone; 288/7 (50 overs)	v	East Zone; 257/9 (47 overs)
Mahidul Islam Ankon 95 (86); Khaled Ahmed 3/69 (10)		Yasir Ali 67 (52); Nazmul Islam 2/52 (10)

Central Zone won by 23 runs (D/L)
Sheikh Kamal International Stadium, Cox's Bazar
Umpires: Ali Arman and Masudur Rahman
Player of the match: Mahidul Islam Ankon (Central Zone)

- East Zone won the toss and elected to field first

Match 2
24 December 2023
9:00
Scorecard

South Zone; 305/5 (50 overs)	v	North Zone; 306/4 (48.3 overs)
Mosaddek Hossain 69* (44); Yeasin Arafat 2/50 (9)		Pritom Kumar 108 (112); Sohag Gazi 2/52 (7.3)

North Zone won by 6 wickets
Sheikh Kamal International Stadium, Cox's Bazar
Umpires: Gazi Sohel and Tanvir Ahmed
Player of the match: Abdullah Al Mamun (North Zone)

- North Zone won the toss and elected to field first

=== Round 2 ===
Match 3
26 December 2023
9:00 am
Scorecard

South Zone; 163 (48.2 overs)	v	Central Zone; 167/6 (49.2 overs)
Sohag Gazi 54 (57); Nazmul Islam 3/21 (10)		Mahidul Islam Ankon 74* (136); Hasan Murad 3/13 (10)

Central Zone won by 4 wickets.
Sheikh Kamal International Stadium, Cox's Bazar
Umpires: Gazi Sohel and Tanvir Ahmed
Player of the match: Mahidul Islam Ankon (Central Zone)

- Central Zone won the toss and elected to field first

Match 4
26 December 2023
9:00 am
Scorecard

East Zone; 279 (49.2 overs)	v	North Zone; 217 (40.5 overs)
Mahmudul Hasan Joy 112 (128); Taibur Rahman 2/39 (10)		Pritom Kumar 46 (51); Rejaur Rahman Raja 3/44 (7.5)

East Zone won by 62 runs.
Sheikh Kamal International Stadium, Cox's Bazar
Umpires: Ali Arman and Masudur Rahman
Player of the match: Mahmudul Hasan Joy (East Zone)

- East Zone won the toss and elected to bat first

=== Round 3 ===
Match 5
28 December 2023
9:00
Scorecard

Central Zone; 201 (48.1 Overs)	v	North Zone; 203/2 (24.4 Overs)
Mahidul Islam Ankon 67* (99); Shohidul Islam 4/41 (9)		Habibur Rahman Sohan 117 (61); Jishan Alam 1/13 (3)

North Zone won by 8 wickets.
Sheikh Kamal International Stadium, Cox's Bazar
Umpires: Gazi Sohel and Muhammad Kamruzzaman
Player of the match: Habibur Rahman Sohan (North Zone)

- North Zone won the toss and elected to field first

Match 6
28 December 2023
9:00
Scorecard

South Zone; 207 (41.3 Overs)	v	East Zone; 211/3 (39 Overs)
Mosaddek Hossain 47 (53); Nayeem Hasan 4/55 (10)		Zakir Hasan 99 (107); Sumon Khan 1/17 (4)

East Zone won by 7 wickets.
Sheikh Kamal International Stadium, Cox's Bazar
Umpires: Masudur Rahman and Tanvir Ahmed
Player of the match: Zakir Hasan (East Zone)

- East Zone won the toss and elected to field first

=== Final ===
30 December 2023
14:00 (D/N)
Scorecard

East Zone; 275/6 (50 overs	v	North Zone; 276/6 (43.4 overs)
Shahadat Hossain 113 (122); Nahid Rana 5/50 (10)		Pritom Kumar 76 (86); Nasum Ahmed 2/39 (10

North Zone won by 4 wickets.
Sher-e-Bangla National Cricket Stadium, Dhaka
Umpires: Gazi Sohel & Masudur Rahman
Player of the match: Nahid Rana (North Zone)

- North Zone won the toss and elected to field first
