= 2019–20 Bangladesh Cricket League =

Cricket tournament

- Dates: 31 January – 26 February 2020
- Administrator: Bangladesh Cricket Board
- Cricket format: First-class
- Tournament format(s): Round-robin and final
- Champions: South Zone (5th title)
- Participants: 4
- Matches: 7
- Player of the series: Anamul Haque; Abdur Razzak
- Most runs: Anamul Haque (501)
- Most wickets: Abdur Razzak (22)

The 2019–20 Bangladesh Cricket League was the eighth edition of the Bangladesh Cricket League, a first-class cricket competition. It was held in Bangladesh, running from 31 January to 24 February 2020. The tournament had a smaller set of fixtures than previous editions to accommodate the 2019–20 Dhaka Premier Division Cricket League, and was used as preparation for the first Test match against the Pakistan cricket team. South Zone were the defending champions.

In the opening round of matches Tamim Iqbal, batting for East Zone, made the highest score in first-class cricket by a Bangladeshi batsman, with 334 not out. In the final round of matches, South Zone made an unusual declaration, with their score at 114/4, thinking they would prevent Central Zone from earning bonus points and ensuring that they progressed to the final. However, they made a mistake in the points calculation, but still managed to progress after the match was drawn. East Zone also progressed to the final, following their eight wicket win against North Zone.

On 16 February 2020, the Bangladesh Cricket Board (BCB) announced that the final would be scheduled to be played across five days, starting on 22 February, unlike the usual four-day matches that were used in the rest of the tournament. South Zone won the tournament, after they beat East Zone by 105 runs in the final.

== Points table ==
Team	Pld	W	L	D	A	Pts
East Zone	3	2	1	0	0	23.47
South Zone	3	1	0	2	0	19.89
Central Zone	3	1	1	1	0	11.50
North Zone	3	0	2	1	0	6.22

- Advance to the final

== Fixtures ==
=== Round 1 ===
31 January–3 February 2020
Scorecard

South Zone	v	North Zone
262 (67.4 overs); Fazle Mahmud 125 (164); Sumon Khan 3/67 (19.4 overs)		207 (77.1 overs); Ariful Haque 58* (111); Shafiul Islam 6/40 (19.1 overs)
398/3d (102 overs); Shahriar Nafees 111 (251); Ariful Haque 2/51 (11 overs)		278/4 (81 overs); Litton Das 103* (168); Abdur Razzak 2/66 (23 overs)

Match drawn
Zohur Ahmed Chowdhury Stadium, Chittagong
Umpires: Tanvir Ahmed and Mahfuzur Rahman
Player of the match: Shafiul Islam (South Zone)

- North Zone won the toss and elected to field.

31 January–3 February 2020
Scorecard

Central Zone	v	East Zone
213 (75.1 overs); Saif Hassan 58 (214); Taijul Islam 5/58 (22 overs)		555/2d (139.5 overs); Tamim Iqbal 334* (426); Mukidul Islam 1/71 (25 overs)
333 (109.2 overs); Mohammad Mithun 83 (143); Nayeem Hasan 6/85 (29 overs)

East Zone won by an innings and 9 runs
Sher-e-Bangla National Cricket Stadium, Dhaka
Umpires: Morshed Ali Khan and Gazi Sohel
Player of the match: Tamim Iqbal (East Zone)

- East Zone won the toss and elected to field.

=== Round 2 ===
7–10 February 2020
Scorecard

South Zone	v	East Zone
482 (101.3 overs); Nurul Hasan 155 (222); Rejaur Rahman 3/96 (14.1 overs)		306 (95.2 overs); Pinak Ghosh 80 (151); Mahedi Hasan 5/102 (31.2 overs)
187/0 (37.5 overs); Anamul Haque 109* (111)		360 (86.2 overs) (f/o); Pinak Ghosh 121 (139); Mahedi Hasan 4/88 (33 overs)

South Zone won by 10 wickets
Sheikh Kamal International Stadium, Cox's Bazar
Umpires: Tanvir Ahmed and Mahfuzur Rahman
Player of the match: Mahedi Hasan (South Zone)

- East Zone won the toss and elected to field.

7–10 February 2020
Scorecard

Central Zone	v	North Zone
170 (48.5 overs); Raqibul Hasan 70 (127); Taskin Ahmed 5/54 (14 overs)		166 (63.4 overs); Ariful Haque 50 (78); Mustafizur Rahman 4/68 (23 overs)
325 (89.1 overs); Shuvagata Hom 122 (161); Salauddin Sakil 4/77 (18.1 overs)		323 (104.3 overs); Tanbir Hayder 177 (307); Shahidul Islam 3/78 (20 overs)

Central Zone won by 6 runs
Sylhet International Cricket Stadium, Sylhet
Umpires: Morshed Ali Khan and Gazi Sohel
Player of the match: Shuvagata Hom (Central Zone)

- North Zone won the toss and elected to field.
- Tanbir Hayder (North Zone) made the highest total in the fourth innings in a domestic first-class match in Bangladesh.

=== Round 3 ===
14–17 February 2020
Scorecard

Central Zone	v	South Zone
235 (82.2 overs); Marshall Ayub 116 (186); Mahedi Hasan 3/78 (28 overs)		114/4d (28.2 overs); Nurul Hasan 48* (41); Ifran Hossain 2/42 (8 overs)
385/8d (107 overs); Najmul Hossain Shanto 253* (310); Nasum Ahmed 4/85 (25 overs)		386/9 (144 overs); Shamsur Rahman 133 (230); Mehidy Hasan Miraz 4/136 (32 overs)

Match drawn
Sheikh Kamal International Stadium, Cox's Bazar
Umpires: Imran Parvez and Mahfuzur Rahman
Player of the match: Nasum Ahmed (South Zone)

- Central Zone won the toss and elected to bat.

14–17 February 2020
Scorecard

North Zone	v	East Zone
272 (82.4 overs); Mushfiqur Rahim 140 (157); Nayeem Hasan 8/107 (35.4 overs)		331 (116.3 overs); Yasir Ali 165 (318); Sunzamul Islam 7/115 (52 overs)
269 (120.3 overs); Mahidul Islam Ankon 44 (108); Nayeem Hasan 5/101 (52 overs)		211/2 (34.5 overs); Yasir Ali 110 (88); Sunzamul Islam 1/61 (21 overs)

East Zone won by 8 wickets
Sheikh Kamal International Stadium, Cox's Bazar
Umpires: Tanvir Ahmed and Gazi Sohel
Player of the match: Yasir Ali (East Zone)

- North Zone won the toss and elected to bat.

=== Final ===
22–26 February 2020
Scorecard

South Zone	v	East Zone
486 (139 overs); Farhad Reza 103* (186); Mohammad Ashraful 2/13 (6 overs)		273 (86.3 overs); Tanzid Hasan 82 (87); Abdur Razzak 7/102 (32.3 overs)
140 (35.1 overs); Mahedi Hasan 53 (84); Hasan Mahmud 4/35 (10.1 overs)		248 (68.4 overs); Mahmudul Hasan 81 (104); Shafiul Islam 3/56 (15 overs)

South Zone won by 105 runs
Sylhet International Cricket Stadium, Sylhet
Umpires: Mahfuzur Rahman and Masudur Rahman
Player of the match: Farhad Reza (South Zone)

- East Zone won the toss and elected to field.
- Tanzid Hasan (East Zone) made his first-class debut.
