= 2023–24 Bangladesh Cricket League =

Cricket tournament

- Dates: 5 December 2023 – 20 December 2023
- Administrator: Bangladesh Cricket Board
- Cricket format: First-class
- Tournament format: Round-robin
- Host: Bangladesh
- Champions: East Zone (1st title)
- Participants: 4
- Matches: 6
- Player of the series: Khaled Ahmed (East Zone)
- Most runs: Naeem Islam (244)
- Most wickets: Khaled Ahmed (18)

The 2023–24 Bangladesh Cricket League is the eleventh edition of the Bangladesh Cricket League (BCL), a first-class cricket competition that is being held in Bangladesh from 5 December 2023 to 20 December 2023. Bangladesh Cricket Board (BCB) announced the 11th BCL would be held in December 2023. South Zone were the defending champions. East Zone clinched their maiden BCL title, finishing as the table-toppers.

== Squads ==
As of 20 December 2023

Central Zone	East Zone	North Zone	South Zone
Saif Hassan (c); Mohammad Naim; Rony Talukdar; Shuvagoto Hom; Shohidul Islam; Taibur Rahman; Md Anamul Haque; Mahidul Islam Ankon (wk); Naeem Islam; Abu Haider Rony; Arif Ahmed; Ripon Mondol; Nazmul Islam Apu; Abdul Mazid	Irfan Shukkur (c) (wk); Shykat Ali; Amite Hasan; Jaker Ali; Nasum Ahmed; Yasir Ali; Parvez Hossain Emon; Shamsur Rahman; Rejaur Rahman Raja; Tanzim Hasan Sakib; Nayeem Ahmed; Shamim Hossain; Abu Jayed Rahi; Khaled Ahmed; Mominul Haque; Zakir Hasan; Shahadat Hossain	Akbar Ali (c); Abdullah Al Mamum; Mushfiq Hasan; Nahid Rana; Pritom Kumar (wk); Rishad Hossain; Sabbir Hossain; Sabbir Rahman; Sunzamul Islam; Tanzid Hasan; Towhid Hridoy; Aich Mollah; Aminul Islam; Enamul Hoque Ashiq; Nahidul Islam; Yeasin Arafat; Mahmudul Hasan Joy; Asadullah Galib; Hasan Murad; Enamul Haque jr	Mohammad Mithun (c); Afif Hossain; Al-Amin Hossain; Anamul Haque (wk); Fazle Mahmud; Kamrul Islam Rabbi; Mahedi Hasan; Marshal Ayub; Moin Khan; Soumya Sarker; Tanvir Islam; Arafat Sunny; Prantik Nawrose Nabil; Pinak Ghosh; Tanbir Hayder; Sumon Khan; Nurul Hasan; Naeem Hasan; Asaduzzaman Payel; Abdul Halim

== Venue ==
Locations of all stadiums which have hosted in 2023-24 Bangladesh Cricket League season

Dhaka	Chittagong	Sylhet	Sylhet
Sher-e-Bangla National Cricket Stadium	Zohur Ahmed Chowdhury Stadium	Sylhet International Cricket Stadium	SICS Academy Ground
Capacity: 25,416	Capacity: 22,000	Capacity: 18,500	Capacity:
	Zahur Ahmed Chowdhury Stadium		
Matches:1	Matches:2	Matches:2	Matches:1

== Points table ==
Team	Pld	W	L	D	A	NRR	Pts
East Zone (C)	3	2	0	1	0	1.901	5
Central Zone	3	1	1	1	0	1.114	3
North Zone	3	0	1	2	0	0.793	2
South Zone	3	0	1	2	0	0.605	2

- Champion

== Fixture ==
=== Round 1 ===
5–8 December 2023
Scorecard

East Zone	v	South Zone
402 (134.1 overs); Parvez Hossain Emon 90 (167); Tanvir Islam 5/114 (42 overs)		282 (97.2 overs); Fazle Mahmud Rabbi 81 (250); Nasum Ahmed 5/75 (30.2 overs)
249/6d (67.3 overs); Amite Hasan 102* (193); Mehedi Hasan 2/46 (15 overs)		80/3 (16 overs); Anamul Haque Bijoy 55 (50); Nasum Ahmed 2/23 (8 overs)

Match Drawn
Zohur Ahmed Chowdhury Stadium, Chittagong
Umpires: Moniruzzaman and Sharfuddoula
Player of the match: Nasum Ahmed (East Zone)

- South Zone won the toss and elected to field.

5–8 December 2023
Scorecard

Central Zone	v	North Zone
281 (68.4 overs); Naeem Islam 122 (195); Mushfiq Hasan 4/37 (16.4 overs)		277 (72 overs); Towhid Hridoy 165 (166); Arif Ahmed 3/80 (22 overs)
54/0 (11); Rony Talukder 32 (38)

Match Drawn
SICS Academy Ground, Sylhet
Umpires: Ali Arman and Morshed Ali Khan
Player of the match: Towhid Hridoy (North Zone)

- North Zone won the toss and elected to field.
- No play was possible on day 3 due to rain.

=== Round 2 ===
11–14 December 2023
Scorecard

North Zone	v	South Zone
219 (74.3 overs); Nahidul Islam 51 (86); Mahedi Hasan 4/63 (19 overs)		243 (93.2 overs); Prantik Nawrose Nabil 90 (228); Yeasin Arafat 4/47 (19.2 overs)
345/7d (95 overs); Abdullah Al Mamun 117* (258); Mehedi Hasan 3/112 (36 overs)		172/8 (71 overs); Marshall Ayub 52 (84); Nahidul Islam 5/29 (19 overs)

Match Drawn
Sylhet International Cricket Stadium, Sylhet
Umpires: Muhammad Kamruzzaman and Sharfuddoula
Player of the match: Nahidul Islam (North Zone)

- South Zone won the toss and elected to field.

11–14 December 2023
Scorecard

Central Zone	v	East Zone
280 (88.4 overs); Mahidul Islam Ankon 91 (174); Naeem Ahmed 4/61 (22 overs)		257 (80.1 overs); Yasir Ali 120 (179); Abu Haider 3/27 (10.1 overs)
125 (38.2 overs); Shuvagoto Hom 25 (40); Naeem Ahmed 4/16 (9 overs)		149/3 (43.2 overs); Amite Hasan 63* (137); Nazmul Islam Apu 1/29 (18 overs)

East Zone won by 7 wickets
Zohur Ahmed Chowdhury Stadium, Chittagong
Umpires: Morshed Ali Khan and Masudur Rahman
Player of the match: Yasir Ali (East Zone)

- Central Zone won the toss and elected to bat.

=== Round 3 ===
18–21 December 2023
Scorecard

South Zone	v	Central Zone
214 (68.3 overs); Moin Khan 75 (110; Shohidul Islam 3/31 (15.3 overs)		248 (74 overs); Naeem Islam 89 (181); Naeem Hasan 3/66 (26 overs)
49/9 (25 overs); Pinak Ghosh 14 (55); Abu Hider 4/6 (6 overs)		16/0 (1 over); Mohammad Naim 14 (8)

Central Zone won by 10 wickets
Sher-e-Bangla Cricket Stadium, Dhaka
Umpires: Morshed Ali Khan and Tanvir Ahmed
Player of the match: Naeem Islam (Central Zone)

- Central Zone won the toss and elected to field first

18–21 December 2023
Scorecard

North Zone	v	East Zone
108 (34.3 overs); Abdullah Al Mamun 26 (50); Khaled Ahmed 4/40 (15.3 overs)		352 (95.4 overs); Mominul Haque 117 (167); Nahid Rana 4/68 (22 overs)
132 (38 overs); Akbar Ali 33 (40); Khaled Ahmed 7/50 (13 overs)

East Zone won by an innings and 112 runs
Sylhet International Cricket Stadium, Sylhet
Umpires: Masudur Rahman and Muhammad Kamruzzaman
Player of the match: Khaled Ahmed (East Zone)

- East Zone won the toss and elected to field first

== Statistics ==
=== Most runs ===
Runs	Player	M	HS	SR	100	50	4s	6s
244	Naeem Islam (Central Zone)	3	122	52.47	1	1	25	4
219	Amite Hasan (East Zone)	3	102*	46.00	1	1	25	6
216	Abdullah Al Mamun (North Zone)	3	117*	44.35	1	0	16	8
Last updated: 20 December 2023

=== Most wickets ===
Wkts	Player	M	Econ	BBI
18	Khaled Ahmed (East Zone)	2	3.53	7/50
12	Abu Hider (Central Zone)	3	3.31	4/6
10	Nahidul Islam (North Zone)	2	2.46	5/29
Last updated: 20 December 2023
