= 2017–18 Bangladesh Cricket League =

Cricket tournament

- Dates: 9 January – 27 April 2018
- Administrator: Bangladesh Cricket Board
- Cricket format: First-class
- Tournament format: Round-robin
- Champions: South Zone (3rd title)
- Participants: 4
- Most runs: Litton Das (779)
- Most wickets: Abdur Razzak (43)

The 2017–18 Bangladesh Cricket League was the sixth edition of the Bangladesh Cricket League, a first-class cricket competition. It was held in Bangladesh, starting on 6 January 2018 and concluding on 27 April 2018. North Zone were the defending champions.

In round two of the tournament, Tushar Imran scored his 10,000th run in first-class cricket and Abdur Razzak took his 500th first-class wicket. This was the first time either of these landmarks had been reached in Bangladesh cricket.

Following the third round of fixtures, the tournament took a break, ahead of the 2017–18 Dhaka Premier Division Cricket League. The tournament resumed on 10 April 2018.

South Zone won the tournament, after beating the defending champions North Zone by an innings and 63 runs in the final round of matches.

== Points table ==
Team	Pld	W	L	D	A	Pts
South Zone	6	1	0	5	0	65
North Zone	6	2	1	3	0	62
East Zone	6	0	1	5	0	52
Central Zone	6	0	1	5	0	51

- 2017–18 Champions

== Fixtures ==
=== Round 1 ===
9–12 January 2018
Scorecard

Central Zone	v	North Zone
188 (56 overs); Irfan Sukkur 57* (55); Ariful Haque 4/55 (15 overs)		457/9d (119.4 overs); Jahurul Islam 158 (244); Taskin Ahmed 4/122 (27.4 overs)
336 (116.5 overs); Raqibul Hasan 105 (152); Suhrawadi Shuvo 4/71 (24.4 overs)		70/1 (12.1 overs); Najmul Hossain Shanto 31* (36); Tanbir Hayder 1/15 (2.1 overs)

North Zone won by 9 wickets
Sylhet International Cricket Stadium, Sylhet
Umpires: Mahfuzur Rahman and Nadir Shah
Player of the match: Jahurul Islam (North Zone)

- North Zone won the toss and elected to field.

9–12 January 2018
Scorecard

East Zone	v	South Zone
546 (129.5 overs); Mominul Haque 258 (344); Abdur Razzak 6/178 (40.5 overs)		395 (110.5 overs); Mosaddek Hossain 110 (226); Sohag Gazi 5/86 (24.5 overs)
93/4 (29 overs); Litton Das 51* (67); Abdur Razzak 3/41 (10 overs)

Match drawn
Bangladesh Krira Shikkha Protisthan No 4 Ground, Savar
Umpires: Anisur Rahman and Sharfuddoula
Player of the match: Mominul Haque (East Zone)

- East Zone won the toss and elected to bat.
- Mominul Haque (East Zone) made his highest score in first-class cricket.

=== Round 2 ===
15–18 January 2018
Scorecard

North Zone	v	East Zone
187 (49.5 overs); Farhad Hossain 40 (68); Abu Jayed 5/71 (17 overs)		211 (63.4 overs); Mehedi Hasan Rana 46* (65); Ariful Haque 3/44 (15 overs)
284 (81.3 overs); Farhad Hossain 85 (184); Khaled Ahmed 5/89 (25 overs)		202/6 (57.4 overs); Mominul Haque 107 (147); Taijul Islam 4/68 (24 overs)

Match drawn
Sylhet International Cricket Stadium, Sylhet
Umpires: Mahfuzur Rahman and Tanvir Ahmed
Player of the match: Mominul Haque (East Zone)

- East Zone won the toss and elected to field.

15–18 January 2018
Scorecard

South Zone	v	Central Zone
448 (115.4 overs); Nurul Hasan 133 (129); Ebadot Hossain 3/87 (28 overs)		505 (150.4 overs); Robiul Islam Robi 90 (182); Abdur Razzak 4/152 (52.4 overs)
120/3 (26 overs); Shahriar Nafees 50* (63); Ebadot Hossain 1/15 (3 overs)

Match drawn
Bangladesh Krira Shikkha Protisthan No 3 Ground, Savar
Umpires: Gazi Sohel and Morshed Ali Khan
Player of the match: Nurul Hasan (South Zone)

- Central Zone won the toss and elected to field.
- Tushar Imran (South Zone) scored his 10,000th run in first-class cricket.
- Abdur Razzak (South Zone) took his 500th wicket in first-class cricket.

=== Round 3 ===
21–24 January 2018
Scorecard

North Zone	v	South Zone
408 (106.2 overs); Junaid Siddique 137 (238); Abdur Razzak 6/107 (34.2 overs)		433 (115.1 overs); Tushar Imran 148 (293); Shafiul Islam 4/58 (13 overs)
356/5 (71.3 overs); Junaid Siddique 150 (170); Al-Amin Hossain 1/16 (5 overs)

Match drawn
Sheikh Abu Naser Stadium, Khulna
Umpires: Mahfuzur Rahman and Nadir Shah
Player of the match: Junaid Siddique (North Zone)

- South Zone won the toss and elected to field.

21–24 January 2018
Scorecard

East Zone	v	Central Zone
735/6d (164 overs); Zakir Hasan 211 (320); Shuvagata Hom 3/183 (48.2 overs)		428 (121.1 overs); Raqibul Hasan 85 (168); Sohag Gazi 7/141 (46.1 overs)
226/0 (52 overs); Mehedi Maruf 111* (153)

Match drawn
Shahid Kamruzzaman Stadium, Rajshahi
Umpires: Gazi Sohel and Tanvir Ahmed
Player of the match: Zakir Hasan (East Zone)

- East Zone won the toss and elected to bat.
- East Zone made the third-highest total in first-class cricket in Bangladesh and the second-highest total in the history of the Bangladesh Cricket League.
- Zakir Hasan (East Zone) scored his maiden double century in first-class cricket.
- Alok Kapali (East Zone) scored his 20th century in first-class cricket.

=== Round 4 ===
10–13 April 2018
Scorecard

Central Zone	v	North Zone
529 (174.1 overs); Marshall Ayub 132 (210); Ariful Haque 4/79 (30 overs)		300 (93.1 overs); Mushfiqur Rahim 111 (221); Ebadot Hossain 6/61 (19 overs)
		213/2 (65.2 overs) (f/o); Mizanur Rahman 100* (191); Mohammad Sharif 1/9 (4 overs)

Match drawn
Shaheed Chandu Stadium, Bogra
Umpires: Sharfuddoula and Tanvir Ahmed
Player of the match: Marshall Ayub (Central Zone)

- North Zone won the toss and elected to field.

10–13 April 2018
Scorecard

South Zone	v	East Zone
403 (104.4 overs); Tushar Imran 130 (221); Khaled Ahmed 4/84 (21 overs)		300 (95.5 overs); Jaker Ali 76 (154); Kamrul Islam Rabbi 4/93 (22 overs)
311/7d (68 overs); Tushar Imran 103 (145); Sohag Gazi 3/82 (15 overs)		224/1 (45 overs); Litton Das 113* (129); Kamrul Islam Rabbi 1/32 (4 overs)

Match drawn
Sylhet International Cricket Stadium, Sylhet
Umpires: Mahfuzur Rahman and Nadir Shah
Player of the match: Tushar Imran (South Zone)

- East Zone won the toss and elected to field.

=== Round 5 ===
17–20 April 2018
Scorecard

North Zone	v	East Zone
415 (122.4 overs); Jahurul Islam 113 (238); Sohag Gazi 4/91 (25.4 overs)		217 (63.2 overs); Litton Das 69 (113); Shoriful Islam 4/33 (10 overs)
		170 (38.1 overs) (f/o); Sohag Gazi 50 (38); Yeasin Arafat 3/16 (6 overs)

North Zone (won by an innings and 28 runs
Shere Bangla National Stadium, Mirpur
Umpires: Gazi Sohel and Anisur Rahman
Player of the match: Yeasin Arafat (North Zone)

- East Zone won the toss and elected to field.

17–20 April 2018
Scorecard

South Zone	v	Central Zone
191 (49.5 overs); Fazle Mahmud 40 (41); Ebadot Hossain 4/32 (12 overs)		302 (88.3 overs); Shadman Islam 93 (176); Abdur Razzak 6/106 (31 overs)
484/8d (108.3 overs); Mohammad Mithun 118 (121); Mosharraf Hossain 3/110 (29 overs)		158/5 (55 overs); Abdul Mazid 60* (110); Abdur Razzak 3/73 (28 overs)

Match drawn
Shahid Kamruzzaman Stadium, Rajshahi
Umpires: Sharfuddoula and Mahfuzur Rahman
Player of the match: Abdur Razzak (South Zone)

- Central Zone won the toss and elected to field.
- Salauddin Sakil (Central Zone) made his first-class debut.

=== Round 6 ===
24–27 April 2018
Scorecard

Central Zone	v	East Zone
546 (125.3 overs); Abdul Mazid 205 (246); Sohag Gazi 5/188 (42.3 overs)		711/8d (171 overs); Litton Das 274 (293); Shuvagata Hom 3/206 (56 overs)
194/5 (37.4 overs); Marshall Ayub 85 (75); Abu Jayed 3/41 (7 overs)

Match drawn
Shahid Kamruzzaman Stadium, Rajshahi
Umpires: Nadir Shah and Anisur Rahman
Player of the match: Litton Das (East Zone)

- Central Zone won the toss and elected to bat.
- Mohammad Saifuddin (East Zone) scored his maiden century in first-class cricket.

24–27 April 2018
Scorecard

North Zone	v	South Zone
187 (58.3 overs); Sohrawordi Shuvo 59* (84); Abdur Razzak 5/53 (20.3 overs)		365/8d (105 overs); Imrul Kayes 107 (165); Farhad Reza 5/57 (21 overs)
115 (43.2 overs); Sohrawordi Shuvo 41 (60); Abdur Razzak 6/48 (21.2 overs)

South Zone won by an innings and 63 runs
Sheikh Abu Naser Stadium, Khulna
Umpires: Tanvir Ahmed and Masudur Rahman
Player of the match: Abdur Razzak (South Zone)

- South Zone won the toss and elected to field.
