= 2016–17 Bangladesh Cricket League =

Cricket tournament

- Dates: 28 January 2017 – 8 March 2017
- Administrator: Bangladesh Cricket Board
- Cricket format: First-class
- Tournament format: Round-robin
- Champions: North Zone (1st title)
- Participants: 4
- Matches: 12
- Most runs: Tushar Imran (731)
- Most wickets: Sunzamul Islam (25); Shuvagata Hom (25)

The 2016–17 Bangladesh Cricket League was the fifth edition of the Bangladesh Cricket League, a first-class cricket competition. It was held in Bangladesh from 28 January to 8 March 2017. The tournament was played after the conclusion of the other first-class competition in Bangladesh, the 2016–17 National Cricket League. Central Zone, the defending champions, ended at the bottom of the table with only a single win from their six matches. North Zone won the tournament, securing their first title in the competition.

== Points table ==
Team	Pld	W	L	D	A	Pts
North Zone	6	2	0	4	0	22
South Zone	6	1	0	5	0	16
East Zone	6	1	2	3	0	13
Central Zone	6	1	3	2	0	10

- 2016–17 Champions

== Fixtures ==
=== Round 1 ===
28–31 January 2017
Scorecard

Central Zone	v	East Zone
224 (65.2 overs); Mosharraf Hossain 46* (94); Abu Jayed 5/37 (15.2 overs)		367 (88.3 overs); Litton Das 219 (241); Shuvagata Hom 5/101 (23.3 overs)
198 (77.5 overs); Shamsur Rahman 51 (104); Saqlain Sajib 3/39 (20.5 overs)		57/1 (13.4 overs); Zakir Hasan 33* (33); Shamsur Rahman 1/16 (4 overs)

East Zone won by 9 wickets
Shaheed Chandu Stadium, Bogra
Umpires: Masudur Rahman and Nadir Shah
Player of the match: Litton Das (East Zone)

- East Zone won the toss and elected to field.
- Litton Das scored his maiden double-century in first-class cricket.

28–31 January 2017
Scorecard

North Zone	v	South Zone
492/9d (189.3 overs); Naeem Islam 185 (475); Abdur Razzak 5/185 (62.3 overs)		448 (129.2 overs); Fazle Mahmud 147 (311); Taijul Islam 5/146 (50 overs)
69/2 (25 overs); Jahurul Islam 29 (38); Sohag Gazi 1/22 (9 overs)

Match drawn
Sylhet International Cricket Stadium, Sylhet
Umpires: Anisur Rahman and Sharfuddoula
Player of the match: Naeem Islam (North Zone)

- North Zone won the toss and elected to bat.

=== Round 2 ===
4–7 February 2017
Scorecard

North Zone	v	Central Zone
502 (141.1 overs); Junaid Siddique 181 (281); Shahidul Islam 3/114 (27 overs)		233 (61.1 overs); Saif Hassan 93 (164); Farhad Reza 4/38 (8.1 overs)
		219 (57.4 overs) (f/o); Nurul Hasan 113 (111); Sunzamul Islam 9/85 (29.4 overs)

North Zone won by an innings and 50 runs
Zahur Ahmed Chowdhury Stadium, Chittagong
Umpires: Mahfuzur Rahman and Masudur Rahman
Player of the match: Sunzamul Islam (North Zone)

- Central Zone won the toss and elected to field.
- Sunzamul Islam's figures of 9/85 are the third-best by a Bangladeshi bowler in a first-class match.

4–7 February 2017
Scorecard

South Zone	v	East Zone
403 (96.5 overs); Anamul Haque 89 (116); Ebadot Hossain 3/85 (22 overs)		144 (43 overs); Abul Hasan 48 (53); Rubel Hossain 5/22 (10 overs)
		215 (77.3 overs) (f/o); Abul Hasan 64 (89); Abdur Razzak 6/44 (29.3 overs)

South Zone won by an innings and 44 runs
Sylhet International Cricket Stadium, Sylhet
Umpires: Anisur Rahman and Nadir Shah
Player of the match: Abdur Razzak (South Zone)

- East Zone won the toss and elected to field.
- Khaled Ahmed (East Zone) made his first-class debut.

=== Round 3 ===
11–14 February 2017
Scorecard

South Zone	v	Central Zone
260 (83.5 overs); Tushar Imran 81 (168); Shuvagata Hom 6/91 (24 overs)		299 (91 overs); Shuvagata Hom 100* (125); Abdur Razzak 4/118 (37 overs)
317 (78 overs); Abdur Razzak 76 (61); Taibur Rahman 4/52 (8 overs)		190/5 (79 overs); Shuvagata Hom 52 (124)

Match drawn
Bangladesh Krira Shikkha Protisthan No 3 Ground, Savar
Umpires: Gazi Sohel and Sharfuddoula
Player of the match: Shuvagata Hom (Central Zone)

- Central Zone won the toss and elected to field.
- Rubel Hossain 2/41 (14 overs)

11–14 February 2017
Scorecard

East Zone	v	North Zone
490 (169.5 overs); Yasir Ali 110* (250); Yasin Arafat 3/61 (23.5 overs)		404 (151.1 overs); Naeem Islam 100 (284); Abul Hasan 3/66 (28 overs)
92/1 (21 overs); Imtiaz Hossain 44* (67); Nasir Hossain 1/15 (5 overs)

Match drawn
Khan Shaheb Osman Ali Stadium, Fatullah
Umpires: Morshed Ali Khan and Tanvir Ahmed
Player of the match: Afif Hossain (East Zone)

- East Zone won the toss and elected to bat.
- Afif Hossain (East Zone) made his first-class debut, scoring a century.

=== Round 4 ===
18–21 February 2017
Scorecard

Central Zone	v	East Zone
328 (115.1 overs); Mohammad Sharif 70 (102); Abu Jayed 5/77 (29 overs)		211 (67.1 overs); Abul Hasan 48 (57); Mohammad Sharif 4/59 (13.1 overs)
282/7d (69.3 overs); Marshall Ayub 73 (126); Mominul Haque 2/39 (10 overs)		172 (56.2 overs); Alok Kapali 71 (114); Shuvagata Hom 4/46 (14 overs)

Central Zone won by 227 runs
Khan Shaheb Osman Ali Stadium, Fatullah
Umpires: Anisur Rahman and Nadir Shah
Player of the match: Mohammad Sharif (Central Zone)

- East Zone won the toss and elected to field.

18–21 February 2017
Scorecard

South Zone	v	North Zone
501 (144.4 overs); Tushar Imran 220 (369); Suhrawadi Shuvo 4/105 (26.4 overs)		242 (62.2 overs); Dhiman Ghosh 67 (74); Nahidul Islam 5/104 (25 overs)
		403/8 (137 overs) (f/o); Naeem Islam 129* (243); Nahidul Islam 5/130 (42 overs)

Match drawn
Bangladesh Krira Shikkha Protisthan No 3 Ground, Savar
Umpires: Mahfuzur Rahman and Masudur Rahman
Player of the match: Tushar Imran (South Zone)

- South Zone won the toss and elected to bat.

=== Round 5 ===
25–28 February 2017
Scorecard

Central Zone	v	North Zone
181 (63.5 overs); Saif Hassan 63 (136); Sunzamul Islam 5/45 (24.5 overs)		537 (134.5 overs); Naeem Islam 142 (285); Mosharraf Hossain 3/125 (43 overs)
271 (76 overs); Saif Hassan 70 (98); Alauddin Babu 4/67 (17 overs)

North Zone won by an innings and 85 runs
Sylhet International Cricket Stadium, Sylhet
Umpires: Gazi Sohel and Masudur Rahman

- North Zone won the toss and elected to field.

25–28 February 2017
Scorecard

South Zone	v	East Zone
296 (80 overs); Imrul Kayes 136 (210); Saqlain Sajib 3/17 (10 overs)		523/7d (178 overs); Afif Hossain 137 (238); Nazmul Islam 2/98 (37 overs)
198/5 (96 overs); Shahriar Nafees 36 (98); Nayeem Hasan 2/48 (34 overs)

Match drawn
Khan Shaheb Osman Ali Stadium, Fatullah
Umpires: Mahfuzur Rahman and Sharfuddoula
Player of the match: Afif Hossain (East Zone)

- South Zone won the toss and elected to bat.

=== Round 6 ===
5–8 March 2017
Scorecard

South Zone	v	Central Zone
749/8d (199.2 overs); Tushar Imran 217 (338); Shuvagata Hom 3/202 (54 overs)		415 (143.5 overs); Shadman Islam 113 (330); Nazmul Islam 4/100 (39.2 overs)
33/0 (2 overs); Tushar Imran 28* (12)

Match drawn
Bangladesh Krira Shikkha Protisthan No 3 Ground, Savar
Umpires: Gazi Sohel and Morshed Ali Khan
Player of the match: Shahriar Nafees (South Zone)

- South Zone won the toss and elected to bat.

5–8 March 2017
Scorecard

North Zone	v	East Zone
374 (111.3 overs); Farhad Hossain 108 (217); Mohammad Saifuddin 4/55 (22.3 overs)		216 (69.5 overs); Mohammad Saifuddin 40 (90); Shafiul Islam 6/70 (21.5 overs)
295/8d (79 overs); Najmul Hossain Shanto 122* (193); Mohammad Saifuddin 3/66 (25 overs)		128/3 (36 overs); Tasamul Haque 44* (84); Shafiul Islam 2/37 (12 overs)

Match drawn
Khan Shaheb Osman Ali Stadium, Fatullah
Umpires: Akteruzzaman and Nadir Shah
Player of the match: Farhad Hossain (North Zone)

- East Zone won the toss and elected to field.
