= 2021–22 Bangladesh Cricket League =

Cricket tournament

- Dates: 12 December 2021 – 6 January 2022
- Administrator: Bangladesh Cricket Board
- Cricket format: First-class
- Tournament format(s): Round-robin and final
- Champions: Central Zone (3rd title)
- Participants: 4
- Matches: 7
- Player of the series: Mohammad Mithun; Zakir Hasàn
- Most runs: Mohammad Mithun (468)
- Most wickets: Hasan Murad (22)

The 2021–22 Bangladesh Cricket League or Bangabandhu Bangladesh Cricket League (BCL) 2021-22 was the ninth edition of the Bangladesh Cricket League (BCL), a first-class cricket competition that was held in Bangladesh from 12 December 2021 to 6 January 2022. In March 2021, Bangladesh Cricket Board (BCB) announced the domestic cricket schedule from 2021 to 2023 and confirmed that the 9th BCL would be held in December 2021. South Zone were the defending champions. Central Zone won the 2021–22 edition by defeating South Zone by 4 wickets in the final. The tournament was followed by the 2021–22 Bangladesh Cricket League One Day.

== Points table ==
Team	Pld	W	L	D	A	Pts
South Zone	3	1	0	2	0	12
Central Zone	3	1	1	1	0	11
North Zone	3	1	1	1	0	10
East Zone	3	1	2	0	0	8

- Advance to the final

== Fixtures ==
=== Round 1 ===
12–15 December 2021
Scorecard

East Zone	v	South Zone
260 (86.3 overs); Mohammad Ashraful 61 (120); Mahedi Hasan 5/81 (37.3 overs)		429 (118.2 overs); Zakir Hasan 158 (276); Anamul Haque 3/69 (22 overs)
257 (84.2 overs); Afif Hossain 86 (125); Nahidul Islam 4/30 (14 overs)		90/2 (21.3 overs); Towhid Hridoy 54* (60); Rejaur Rahman Raja 2/16 (4 overs)

South Zone won by 8 wickets
Shaheed Qamaruzzaman Stadium, Rajshahi
Umpires: Masudur Rahman and Gazi Sohel
Player of the match: Zakir Hasan (South Zone)

- South Zone won the toss and elected to field.

12–15 December 2021
Scorecard

North Zone	v	Central Zone
219 (65.1 overs); Pervez Hossain Emon 46 (72); Robiul Haque 3/37 (15.1 overs)		563/3d (130.1 overs); Mohammad Mithun 176 (257); Naeem Islam 1/61 (21.2 overs)
274 (121.2 overs); Marshall Ayub 101 (246); Hasan Murad 6/74 (45 overs)

Central Zone won by an innings and 70 runs
Zohur Ahmed Chowdhury Stadium, Chittagong
Umpires: Tanvir Ahmed and Mahfuzur Rahman
Player of the match: Mohammad Mithun and Mizanur Rahman (Central Zone)

- Central Zone won the toss and elected to field.

=== Round 2 ===
19–22 December 2021
Scorecard

North Zone	v	South Zone
385 (138.4 overs); Naeem Islam 137 (342); Nasum Ahmed 6/126 (44 overs)		687 (275.5 overs); Towhid Hridoy 217 (387); Sharifullah 4/156 (60.5 overs)
62/1 (26 overs); Tanzid Hasan 34 (59); Nasum Ahmed 1/10 (10 overs)

South Zone won by 268 runs
Zohur Ahmed Chowdhury Stadium, Chittagong
Umpires: Mozahiduzzaman and Mahfuzur Rahman
Player of the match: Towhid Hridoy (South Zone)

- South Zone won the toss and elected to field.

19–22 December 2021
Scorecard

East Zone	v	Central Zone
245 (83.5 overs); Shahadat Hossain 72 (132); Abu Hider 5/93 (20.5 overs)		227 (89.3 overs); Jaker Ali 92 (180); Tanvir Islam 3/42 (21.3 overs)
180 (46.5 overs); Nayeem Hasan 68 (88); Hasan Murad 4/37 (6.5 overs)		188 (59.1 overs); Soumya Sarkar 73 (139); Nayeem Hasan 6/48 (20 overs)

East Zone won by 10 runs
Sher-e-Bangla National Cricket Stadium, Dhaka
Umpires: Morshed Ali Khan and Muhammad Kamruzzaman
Player of the match: Nayeem Hasan (East Zone)

- Central Zone won the toss and elected to field.

=== Round 3 ===
26–29 December 2021
Scorecard

Central Zone	v	South Zone
481 (147.5 overs); Shuvagata Hom 152 (211); Rishad Hossain 5/129 (34.5 overs)		494 (158.3 overs); Towhid Hridoy 122 (155); Mukidul Islam 3/66 (21 overs)
99/4 (36 overs); Soumya Sarkar 43 (77); Rishad Hossain 2/30 (12 overs)

Match drawn
Zohur Ahmed Chowdhury Stadium, Chittagong
Umpires: Imran Parvez and Gazi Sohel

- South Zone won the toss and elected to field.

26–29 December 2021
Scorecard

East Zone	v	North Zone
166 (55.5 overs); Mohammad Ashraful 70 (160); Shafiqul Islam 5/35 (14 overs)		310 (101.1 overs); Tanzid Hasan 91 (206); Ifran Hossain 5/56 (21.1 overs)
254 (51 overs); Nayeem Hasan 45 (37); Sunzamul Islam 8/98 (20 overs)		111/4 (28 overs); Junaid Siddique 38 (70); Tanvir Islam 2/35 (8 overs)

North Zone won by 6 wickets
Shaheed Qamaruzzaman Stadium, Rajshahi
Umpires: Shafiuddin Ahmed and Sharfuddoula

- North Zone won the toss and elected to field.
- Mohiuddin Tareq (North Zone) made his first-class debut.

=== Final ===
2–6 January 2022
Scorecard

South Zone	v	Central Zone
387 (111.3 overs); Zakir Hasan 107* (161); Hasan Murad 5/101 (29 overs)		438 (127.4 overs); Mohammad Mithun 206 (306); Farhad Reza 4/53 (18 overs)
268 (75.5 overs); Rishad Hossain 99 (136); Abu Hider 5/78 (24 overs)		221/6 (63.5 overs); Shuvagata Hom 114* (121); Nasum Ahmed 2/43 (13.5 overs)

Central Zone won by 4 wickets
Sher-e-Bangla National Cricket Stadium, Dhaka
Umpires: Mahfuzur Rahman and Sharfuddoula
Player of the match: Shuvagata Hom (Central Zone)

- Central Zone won the toss and elected to field.

== See also ==
- 2021–22 National Cricket League
- 2021–22 Bangladesh Premier League
