= 2025–26 BCL 1-Day =

Cricket tournament

2025–26 Bangladesh Cricket League One Day
- Dates: 23 February – 3 March 2026
- Administrator: Bangladesh Cricket Board
- Cricket format: List A
- Tournament format(s): Round-robin and Final
- Champions: Central Zone (2nd title)
- Runners-up: North Zone
- Participants: 4
- Matches: 7
- Most runs: Mohammad Naim (240)
- Most wickets: Rishad Hossain (9)

The 2025–26 Bangladesh Cricket League One Day was the 4th edition of the BCL 1-Day, a List A cricket competition in Bangladesh. It was held from 23 February to 3 March 2026.

North Zone were the defending champion.

Central Zone won their 2nd title by deafeating North Zone in the final by 5 wickets.

== Teams and standing ==
=== Points table ===
Pos	Team	Pld	W	L	NR	Pts	NRR
1	North Zone	3	2	1	0	4	1.360
2	Central Zone	3	2	1	0	4	0.047
3	East Zone	3	1	2	0	2	−0.450
4	South Zone	3	1	2	0	2	−0.728

Source: ESPNcricinfo

=== Match summary ===
Team	Group matches			Play-offs
Team	1	2	3	Final
Central Zone	0	2	4	W
East Zone	0	0	2	
North Zone	2	4	4	L
South Zone	2	2	2	

Win	Loss	Tie	No result	Eliminated

- Note: The total points at the end of each group match are listed.
- Note: Click on the points or results to see the match summary.

== Venues ==
- All matches are scheduled to be played across these three venues.

Rajshahi	Bogura	Dhaka
Shaheed Qamaruzzaman Stadium	Shaheed Chandu Stadium	Sher-e-Bangla National Cricket Stadium
Capacity: 15,000	Capacity: 18,000	Capacity: 26,000

Venues of BCL ONE DAY 2026

== Round-robin ==
=== Round 1 ===
Match 1
23 February 2026
09:00
Scorecard

North Zone; 335 (50 overs)	v	East Zone; 281 (49.4 overs)
Akbar Ali 111 (87); Khaled Ahmed 4/52 (10 overs)		Mominul Haque 83 (82); Rishad Hossain 4/57 (10 overs)

North Zone won by 54 runs
Shaheed Chandu Stadium, Bogra
Umpires: Mozahiduzzaman and Masudur Rahman
Player of the match: Akbar Ali (North Zone)

- East Zone won the toss and elected to field.
- Akbar Ali (North Zone) scored his maiden century on List A cricket.

Match 2
23 February 2026
09:00
Scorecard

Central Zone; 264/7 (50 overs)	v	South Zone; 267/3 (45.3 overs)
Mohammad Naim 69 (76); Tanvir Islam 2/46 (10 overs)		Afif Hossain 100* (86); Wasi Siddiquee 1/56 (10 overs)

South Zone won by 7 wickets
Shaheed Qamaruzzaman Stadium, Rajshahi
Umpires: Moniruzzaman and Mahfuzur Rahman
Player of the match: Afif Hossain (South Zone)

- South Zone won the toss and elected to field.

=== Round 2 ===
Match 3
26 February 2026
09:00
Scorecard

South Zone; 144 (30.5 overs)	v	North Zone; 145/4 (25.4 overs)
Mohammad Mithun 55 (79); SH Meherob 3/10 (5 overs)		Litton Das 55* (65); Mustafizur Rahman 3/23 (5 overs)

North Zone won by 6 wickets
Shaheed Qamaruzzaman Stadium, Rajshahi
Umpires: Ishtiaq Ahmed and Mahfuzur Rahman
Player of the match: Nahid Rana (North Zone)

- North Zone won the toss and elected to field.

Match 4
26 February 2026
09:00
Scorecard

East Zone; 237/9 (50 overs)	v	Central Zone; 240/5 (45.3 overs)
Zakir Hasan 45 (51); Rakibul Hasan 3/27 (10 overs)		Mohammad Naim 83 (98); Nayeem Hasan 2/41 (10 overs)

Central Zone won by 5 wickets
Shaheed Chandu Stadium, Bogra
Umpires: Masudur Rahman and Barkatulylah Turkey
Player of the match: Abu Hider (Central Zone)

- Central Zone won the toss and elected to field.

=== Round 3 ===
Match 5
28 February 2026
09:00
Scorecard

North Zone; 322/7 (50 overs)	v	Central Zone; 325/8 (49.2 overs)
Towhid Hridoy 102 (113); Abu Hider 4/59 (10 overs)		Jishan Alam 127 (93); Rishad Hossain 3/65 (10 overs)

Central Zone won by 2 wickets
Shaheed Qamaruzzaman Stadium, Rajshahi
Umpires: Moniruzzaman and Mahfuzur Rahman
Player of the match: Jishan Alam (Central Zone)

- Central Zone won the toss and elected to field.
- Jishan Alam (Central Zone) scored his maiden century in List A cricket.

Match 6
28 February 2026
09:00
Scorecard

South Zone; 180 (43.2 overs)	v	East Zone; 181/9 (47.3 overs)
Anisul Islam Emon 50 (53); Nayeem Hasan 3/24 (10 overs)		Shahadat Hossain 42 (62); Soumya Sarkar 4/32 (9 overs)

East Zone won by 1 wicket
Shaheed Chandu Stadium, Bogra
Umpires: Mozahiduzzaman and Masudur Rahman
Player of the match: Nayeem Hasan (East Zone)

- East Zone won the toss and elected to field.

== Final ==
Final
3 March 2026
14:30 (D/N)
Scorecard

North Zone; 238 (49.3 overs)	v	Central Zone; 239/5 (38 overs)
Towhid Hridoy 88 (79); Ripon Mondol 4/41 (9.3 overs)		Saif Hassan 88 (79); Rishad Hossain 2/49 (9 overs)

Central Zone won by 5 wickets
Sher-e-Bangla National Cricket Stadium, Mirpur
Umpires: Mahfuzur Rahman and Masudur Rahman
Player of the match: Saif Hassan (Central Zone)

- Central Zone won the toss and elected to field.
