= 2021–22 BCL 1-Day =

Cricket tournament

2021–22 Bangladesh Cricket League One Day
- Dates: 9 – 15 January 2022
- Administrator: Bangladesh Cricket Board
- Cricket format: List A
- Tournament format: Round-robin
- Champions: Central Zone (1st title)
- Participants: 4
- Matches: 7
- Player of the series: Mosaddek Hossain
- Most runs: Imrul Kayes (165)
- Most wickets: Soumya Sarkar (7); Mahedi Hasan (7); Nayeem Hasan (7); Mustafizur Rahman (7)

The 2021–22 Bangladesh Cricket League One Day (2021–22 BCL 1-Day), or 2022 Independence Cup, was the inaugural edition of the BCL 1-Day, a List A cricket competition in Bangladesh. It was held from 9 to 15 January 2022. The same teams that competed at the first-class 2021–22 Bangladesh Cricket League featured in this tournament.

Central Zone won the tournament, after defeating South Zone by six wickets in the final.

== Points table ==
Team	Pld	W	L	NR	Pts	NRR
Central Zone	3	2	1	0	4	+0.263
South Zone	3	2	1	0	4	–0.375
East Zone	3	1	2	0	2	+0.074
North Zone	3	1	2	0	2	+0.029

- Advance to the final

== Fixtures ==
=== Round 1 ===
9 January 2022
09:00
Scorecard

South Zone; 162 (42.4 overs)	v	North Zone; 163/2 (31 overs)
Towhid Hridoy 55 (77); Shafiqul Islam 3/29 (7.4 overs)		Naeem Islam 66* (84); Mahedi Hasan 2/15 (4 overs)

North Zone won by 8 wickets
Sylhet International Cricket Stadium, Sylhet
Umpires: Tanvir Ahmed and Mahfuzur Rahman
Player of the match: Naeem Islam (North Zone)

- North Zone won the toss and elected to field.

9 January 2022
09:00
Scorecard

Central Zone; 177 (43.2 overs)	v	East Zone; 155 (47.1 overs)
Mohammad Mithun 37 (37); Rejaur Rahman Raja 3/21 (9 overs)		Rony Talukdar 38 (60); Soumya Sarkar 2/4 (2 overs)

Central Zone won by 22 runs
Sylhet International Cricket Stadium, Sylhet
Umpires: Mozahiduzzaman and Masudur Rahman
Player of the match: Mosaddek Hossain (Central Zone)

- East Zone won the toss and elected to field.
- Mrittunjoy Chowdhury (Central Zone) made his List A debut.

=== Round 2 ===
11 January 2022
09:00
Scorecard

East Zone; 192/8 (50 overs)	v	South Zone; 193/7 (45.5 overs)
Imrul Kayes 69 (97); Mustafizur Rahman 3/44 (10 overs)		Mahedi Hasan 37* (50); Afif Hossain 3/26 (7.2 overs)

South Zone won by 3 wickets
Sylhet International Cricket Stadium, Sylhet
Umpires: Mahfuzur Rahman and Masudur Rahman
Player of the match: Nahidul Islam (South Zone)

- South Zone won the toss and elected to field.

11 January 2022
09:00
Scorecard

Central Zone; 262/5 (50 overs)	v	North Zone; 234/9 (50 overs)
Mosaddek Hossain 54* (55); Shafiqul Islam 2/71 (10 overs)		Naeem Islam 72 (99); Mrittunjoy Chowdhury 3/21 (6 overs)

Central Zone won by 28 runs
Sylhet International Cricket Stadium, Sylhet
Umpires: Tanvir Ahmed and Ali Arman
Player of the match: Mosaddek Hossain (Central Zone)

- North Zone won the toss and elected to field.
- Aks Swadhin (North Zone) made his List A debut.

=== Round 3 ===
13 January 2022
09:00
Scorecard

Central Zone; 220/8 (50 overs)	v	South Zone; 225/5 (48.4 overs)
Abu Hider 54* (27); Mustafizur Rahman 4/63 (10 overs)		Towhid Hridoy 65* (78); Hasan Murad 2/29 (10 overs)

South Zone won by 5 wickets
Sylhet International Cricket Stadium, Sylhet
Umpires: Tanvir Ahmed and Gazi Sohel
Player of the match: Towhid Hridoy (South Zone)

- South Zone won the toss and elected to field.

13 January 2022
09:00
Scorecard

North Zone; 216 (49.5 overs)	v	East Zone; 217/6 (37.5 overs)
Mahmudullah 66 (87); Nayeem Hasan 3/47 (10 overs)		Imrul Kayes 71 (81); Mahmudullah 3/56 (9.5 overs)

East Zone won by 4 wickets
Sylhet International Cricket Stadium, Sylhet
Umpires: Mozahiduzzaman and Masudur Rahman
Player of the match: Imrul Kayes (East Zone)

- East Zone won the toss and elected to field.

=== Final ===
15 January 2022
09:00
Scorecard

South Zone; 163 (48.5 overs)	v	Central Zone; 164/4 (42.3 overs)
Pinak Ghosh 35 (47); Soumya Sarkar 2/19 (6.5 overs)		Al-Amin 53* (69); Nasum Ahmed 3/32 (10 overs)

Central Zone won by 6 wickets
Sylhet International Cricket Stadium, Sylhet
Umpires: Masudur Rahman and Gazi Sohel
Player of the match: Mosaddek Hossain (Central Zone)

- Central Zone won the toss and elected to field.
