= 2022–23 BCL 1-Day =

Cricket tournament

2022–23 Bangladesh Cricket League One Day
- Dates: 20 – 27 November 2022
- Administrator: Bangladesh Cricket Board
- Cricket format: List A
- Tournament format(s): Round-robin and Final
- Host: Bangladesh
- Champions: North Zone (1st title)
- Runners-up: South Zone
- Participants: 4
- Matches: 7
- Player of the series: Mohammad Naim
- Most runs: Mohammad Naim (210)
- Most wickets: Mehedi Hasan Miraz (10)

The 2022–23 Bangladesh Cricket League One Day was the 2nd edition of the BCL 1-Day, a List A cricket competition. It was held in Bangladesh from 20 to 27 November 2022. The tournament was followed by 2022–23 Bangladesh Cricket League. Central Zone was champion of the previous tournament, after they had defeated South Zone by six wickets in the final.

North Zone won the tournament, by defeating South Zone by 3 runs in the final in Sher-e-Bangla National Stadium .

== Points table ==
Team	Pld	W	L	NR	Pts	NRR
South Zone	3	3	0	0	6	0.810
North Zone	3	2	1	0	4	0.011
East Zone	3	1	2	0	2	0.226
Central Zone	3	0	3	0	0	-1.044

- Advance to the final

== Venues ==
All matches were played at the following grounds:

Dhaka	2022–23 BCL 1-Day is located in Bangladesh
Sher-e-Bangla Cricket Stadium	2022–23 BCL 1-Day is located in Bangladesh
Matches: 1	2022–23 BCL 1-Day is located in Bangladesh
Savar	2022–23 BCL 1-Day is located in Bangladesh
Bangladesh Krira Shikkha Protisthan Ground	2022–23 BCL 1-Day is located in Bangladesh
Matches: 6	2022–23 BCL 1-Day is located in Bangladesh

== Fixture ==
=== Round 1 ===
20 November 2022
9:00
Scorecard

East Zone; 254 (49.1 Overs)	v	Central Zone; 140 (33 Overs)
Yasir Ali 80 (73); Taijul Islam 4/39 (9.1)		Najmul Hossain Shanto 38 (53); Ebadot Hossain 4/46 (9)

East Zone won by 114 runs.
BKSP 3 No Ground, Savar
Umpires: Mozahiduzzaman and Muhammad Kamruzzaman
Player of the match: Yasir Ali (East Zone)

- Central Zone won the toss and elected to field first

20 November 2022
9:00
Scorecard

South Zone; 199 (43.3 Overs)	v	North Zone; 127 (29.3 Overs)
Towhid Hridoy 66 (71); Mohammad Saifuddin 5/30 (8)		Shamim Hossain 42 (43); Mehidy Hasan Miraz 5/42 (9)

South Zone won by 72 runs
BKSP 4 No Ground, Savar
Umpires: Gazi Sohel and Mahfuzur Rahman
Player of the match: Mehidy Hasan Miraz (South Zone)

- North Zone won the toss and elected to field first

=== Round 2 ===
22 November
9:00
Scorecard

South Zone; 282/5 (50 Overs)	v	Central Zone; 256/9 (50 Overs)
Naeem Islam 102 (106); Robiul Haque 3/43 (10)		Jaker Ali 53 (48); Mehidy Hasan Miraz 3/30 (10)

South Zone won by 26 runs
BKSP 4 No Ground, Savar
Umpires: Sharfuddoula and Tanvir Ahmed
Player of the match: Naeem Islam

- Central Zone won the toss and elected to field first

26 December 2023

North Zone	v	East Zone

Sheikh Kamal International Stadium, Cox's Bazar

=== Round 3 ===
28 December 2023

Central Zone	v	North Zone

Sheikh Kamal International Stadium, Cox's Bazar

28 December 2023

South Zone	v	East Zone

Sheikh Kamal International Stadium, Cox's Bazar

=== Final ===
30 December 2023 (D/N)
Scorecard

North Zone	v	South Zone

South Zone won by 3 runs
Sher-e-Bangla National Cricket Stadium, Dhaka
