= 2020–21 BCB President's Cup =

Cricket tournament

- Logo of BCB President's Cup
- Dates: 11 – 25 October 2020
- Administrator: Bangladesh Cricket Board
- Cricket format: 50 overs
- Tournament format: Round-robin
- Champions: Mahmudullah XI (1st title)
- Participants: 3
- Matches: 7
- Player of the series: Mushfiqur Rahim
- Most runs: Mushfiqur Rahim (219)
- Most wickets: Mohammad Saifuddin (12); Rubel Hossain (12)

The 2020–21 BCB President's Cup was a cricket competition that took place in Bangladesh from 11 to 25 October 2020. It was the first cricket tournament to be played in Bangladesh since the start of the COVID-19 pandemic in March 2020. Three teams took part, with all the matches played at the Sher-e-Bangla National Cricket Stadium in Mirpur. The final was originally scheduled to be played on 23 October, but was moved back to 25 October due to the forecast of bad weather in Dhaka.

== Squads ==
The following squads were named for the tournament:

Mahmudullah XI	Najmul XI	Tamim XI
Mahmudullah (c); Mohammad Naim; Liton Das (wk); Mominul Haque; Mahmudul Hasan Joy; Nurul Hasan (wk); Sabbir Rahman; Imrul Kayes; Hasan Mahmud; Ebadot Hossain; Rubel Hossain; Mrittunjoy Chowdhury; Mehedi Hasan; Rakibul Hasan; Aminul Islam	Najmul Hossain Shanto (c); Soumya Sarkar; Saif Hassan; Afif Hossain; Mushfiqur Rahim (wk); Towhid Hridoy; Irfan Sukkur (wk); Parvez Hossain Emon; Taskin Ahmed; Al-Amin Hossain; Abu Jayed; Mukidul Islam; Nayeem Hasan; Nasum Ahmed; Rishad Hossain	Tamim Iqbal (c); Tanzid Hasan; Mosaddek Hossain; Mohammad Mithun (wk); Shahadat Hossain; Yasir Ali; Akbar Ali (wk); Anamul Haque (wk); Mohammad Saifuddin; Mustafizur Rahman; Khaled Ahmed; Shoriful Islam; Mahedi Hasan; Taijul Islam; Minhajul Abedin Afridi

== Points table ==
Team	Pld	W	L	NR	NRR	Pts
Najmul XI	4	3	1	0	+0.723	6
Mahmudullah XI	4	2	2	0	–0.442	4
Tamim XI	4	1	3	0	–0.291	2

Team qualified for the finals

== Fixtures ==
=== Round-robin ===
11 October 2020
13:30 (D/N)
Scorecard

Mahmudullah XI; 196 (47.3 overs)	v	Najmul XI; 197/6 (41.1 overs)
Mahmudullah 51 (82); Taskin Ahmed 2/37 (10 overs)		Irfan Sukkur 56* (78); Ebadot Hossain 3/46 (9 overs)

Najmul XI won by 4 wickets
Sher-e-Bangla National Cricket Stadium, Mirpur
Umpires: Mahfuzur Rahman and Gazi Sohel
Player of the match: Towhid Hridoy (Najmul XI)

- Najmul XI won the toss and elected to field.

13 October 2020
13:30 (D/N)
Scorecard

Tamim XI; 103 (23.1 overs)	v	Mahmudullah XI; 106/5 (27 overs)
Tanzid Hasan 27 (18); Rubel Hossain 3/16 (5 overs)		Nurul Hasan 41* (38); Mohammad Saifuddin 2/8 (4 overs)

Mahmudullah XI won by 5 wickets (DLS method)
Sher-e-Bangla National Cricket Stadium, Mirpur
Umpires: Mahfuzur Rahman and Gazi Sohel
Player of the match: Rubel Hossain (Mahmudullah XI)

- Mahmudullah XI won the toss and elected to field.
- The match was reduced to 47 overs per side due to rain.

15 October 2020
13:30 (D/N)
Scorecard

Tamim XI; 221/9 (50 overs)	v	Najmul XI; 179 (45.4 overs)
Mahedi Hasan 82 (57); Al-Amin Hossain 3/43 (10 overs)		Mushfiqur Rahim 103 (109); Shoriful Islam 4/37 (10 overs)

Tamim XI won by 42 runs
Sher-e-Bangla National Cricket Stadium, Mirpur
Umpires: Tanvir Ahmed and Mahfuzur Rahman
Player of the match: Mahedi Hasan (Tamim XI)

- Najmul XI won the toss and elected to field.

17 October 2020
13:30 (D/N)
Scorecard

Najmul XI; 264/8 (50 overs)	v	Mahmudullah XI; 133 (32.1 overs)
Afif Hossain 98 (107); Rubel Hossain 3/53 (10 overs)		Liton Das 27 (27); Nasum Ahmed 3/23 (8.1 overs)

Najmul XI won by 131 runs
Sher-e-Bangla National Cricket Stadium, Mirpur
Umpires: Tanvir Ahmed and Ali Arman
Player of the match: Afif Hossain (Najmul XI)

- Mahmudullah XI won the toss and elected to field.

19 October 2020
13:30 (D/N)
Scorecard

Tamim XI; 221/8 (50 overs)	v	Mahmudullah XI; 222/6 (49.1 overs)
Yasir Ali 62 (81); Rubel Hossain 4/34 (10 overs)		Mahmudullah 67 (87); Mohammad Saifuddin 3/49 (10 overs)

Mahmudullah XI won by 4 wickets
Sher-e-Bangla National Cricket Stadium, Mirpur
Umpires: Masudur Rahman and Sharfuddoula
Player of the match: Rubel Hossain (Mahmudullah XI)

- Tamim XI won the toss and elected to bat.

21 October 2020
13:30 (D/N)
Scorecard

Najmul XI; 165 (39.3 overs)	v	Tamim XI; 156 (40.4 overs)
Mushfiqur Rahim 51 (75); Mohammad Saifuddin 5/26 (8.3 overs)		Tamim Iqbal 57 (85); Taskin Ahmed 4/36 (8 overs)

Najmul XI won by 7 runs (DLS method)
Sher-e-Bangla National Cricket Stadium, Mirpur
Umpires: Masudur Rahman and Sharfuddoula
Player of the match: Taskin Ahmed (Najmul XI)

- Najmul XI won the toss and elected to bat.
- The match was reduced to 41 overs per side due to rain.

=== Final ===
25 October 2020
13:30 (D/N)
Scorecard

Najmul XI; 173 (47.1 overs)	v	Mahmudullah XI; 177/3 (29.4 overs)
Irfan Sukkur 75 (77); Sumon Khan 5/38 (10 overs)		Liton Das 68 (69); Nasum Ahmed 2/48 (10 overs)

Mahmudullah XI won by 7 wickets
Sher-e-Bangla National Cricket Stadium, Mirpur
Umpires: Masudur Rahman and Sharfuddoula
Player of the match: Sumon Khan (Mahmudullah XI)

- Mahmudullah XI won the toss and elected to field.
