= BCL 1-Day =

Bangladeshi cricket tournament

Bangladesh Cricket League 1-Day
- Countries: Bangladesh
- Administrator: Bangladesh Cricket Board
- Format: List-A
- First edition: 2014–15
- Latest edition: 2025–26
- Tournament format: Round-robin and Final
- Number of teams: 4
- Current champion: Central Zone
- Most successful: North Zone; Central Zone (2 titles each)

The Bangladesh Cricket League is an annual List-A cricket version of Bangladesh Cricket League tournament that began in Bangladesh in the 2021–22 season.

== Winners and runners-up ==
Season	Winners	Runners-up	Source
2014–15	East Zone	North Zone	
2021–22	Central Zone	South Zone	
2022–23	North Zone	South Zone	
2023–24	North Zone	East Zone	
2025–26	Central Zone	North Zone	

- Source: Cricinfo
