= 2012–13 Bangladeshi cricket season =

The 2012–13 season in Bangladesh was the thirteenth edition in which first-class cricket was played at the domestic level. The main domestic competitions were the National Cricket League (NCL), the new Bangladesh Cricket League (BCL) and the second edition of the Bangladesh Premier League (BPL). Internationally, there was a tour by the West Indies during the season.

== International cricket ==
=== West Indies cricket team in Bangladesh ===
The West Indies cricket team toured Bangladesh for the fourth time. The tour consisted of two Test matches, five One Day Internationals and one Twenty20 match. West Indies won both Test matches and the Twenty20 while Bangladesh won the ODI series 3–2.

== Domestic competitions ==
=== National Cricket League ===
The 2012–13 National Cricket League (NCL) was its thirteenth edition as a first-class competition. Khulna Division won the championship title for the fifth time.

==== Teams ====
team	home ground	first season
Barisal Division	Barisal Divisional Stadium	1999–2000
Chittagong Division	Zohur Ahmed Chowdhury Stadium	1999–2000
Dhaka Division	Khan Shaheb Osman Ali Stadium	1999–2000
Dhaka Metropolis	Sher-e-Bangla National Cricket Stadium	2000–01
Khulna Division	Khulna Divisional Stadium	1999–2000
Rajshahi Division	Rajshahi Divisional Stadium	1999–2000
Rangpur Division	Shaheed Chandu Stadium	2011–12
Sylhet Division	Sylhet International Cricket Stadium	1999–2000

==== Final standings ====
Team	Pld	W	L	DWF	DLF	ND	BP	Pts
Khulna Division	7	6	1	0	0	0	4	40
Dhaka Division	7	5	1	0	1	0	6	37
Dhaka Metropolis	7	3	2	1	0	1	4	28
Rajshahi Division	7	3	3	0	0	1	6	26
Sylhet Division	7	2	3	1	0	1	4	21
Chittagong Division	7	1	2	0	2	1	4	21
Rangpur Division	7	1	4	1	1	0	1	13
Barisal Division	7	0	6	0	0	1	0	3

==== Match results ====
	Barisal Division	Chittagong Division	Dhaka Division	Dhaka Metropolis	Khulna Division	Rajshahi Division	Rangpur Division	Sylhet Division
Barisal Division			Dhaka; Innings and 105 runs	Dhaka Metro; 7 wickets			Rangpur; Innings and 40 runs	Sylhet; 165 runs
Chittagong Division	Chittagong; 8 wickets		Dhaka; Innings and 69 runs	Match drawn	Khulna; 299 runs	Chittagong; Innings and 113 runs	Match drawn	Match drawn
Dhaka Division				Match drawn	Dhaka; 5 wickets	Dhaka; 127 runs	Dhaka; 7 wickets	
Dhaka Metropolis					Khulna; 188 runs	Rajshahi; 76 runs	Dhaka Metro; 9 wickets	Dhaka Metro; 9 wickets
Khulna Division	Khulna; 52 runs						Khulna; 5 wickets	Khulna; 10 wickets
Rajshahi Division	Match drawn				Khulna; 33 runs			
Rangpur Division						Rajshahi; 224 runs		Match drawn
Sylhet Division			Sylhet; 10 wickets			Rajshahi; 10 wickets		
Scorecards

=== Bangladesh Premier League ===
The 2013 Bangladesh Premier League, the second staging of the tournament, was held from 18 January to 19 February and featured seven teams, with the addition of the Rangpur Riders to the original six. Champions Dhaka Gladiators retained their title, defeating Chittagong Kings by 43 runs in the final.

=== 2012-13 Bangladesh Cricket League ===
The Bangladesh Cricket League (BCL) was inaugurated in the 2012–13 season as a first-class tournament comprising the best performing players from the 2012-13 National Cricket League (NCL). The BCL consists of four teams with each team made up of players from teams representing two adjacent regions in the NCL. The four teams were placed on sale as franchises, but only three of the teams attracted a buyer. The teams are as follows:

- Walton Central Zone (Dhaka Division and Dhaka Metropolis)
- Prime Bank South Zone (Khulna Division and Barisal Division)
- Islami Bank East Zone (Sylhet Division and Chittagong Division)
- BCB North Zone (Rajshahi Division and Rangpur Division)

Team	Pld	W	L	DWF	DLF	ND	BP	Pts
Central Zone	3	0	0	2	0	1	5	14
North Zone	3	1	0	0	1	1	3	13
South Zone	3	1	1	0	1	0	3	10
East Zone	3	0	1	0	0	2	3	9

==== Results ====
27–30 December 2012
Scorecard

Central Zone	v	South Zone
433/9d (115.4 overs); Ziaur Rahman 152* (118); Mosharraf Hossain 5/52 (21 overs)		343 (73 overs); Marshall Ayub 125 (193); Sohag Gazi 4/162 (46 overs)
93/6 (29 overs); Tushar Imran 65 (138); Mosharraf Hossain 4/68 (30 overs)		216 (66.4 overs); Mahmudullah 50* (83); Robiul Islam 5/17 (6 overs)

Match Drawn
Sher-e-Bangla Cricket Stadium
Player of the match: Mosharraf Hossain (Central Zone)

27–30 December 2012
Scorecard

East Zone	v	North Zone
419/8 (113 overs); Nasir Hossain 93 (133); Tapash Baisya 3/63 (22 overs)		499/6d (131 overs); Dhiman Ghosh 107* (141)

Match Drawn
Shaheed Chandu Stadium

2–5 January 2013
Scorecard

Central Zone	v	North Zone
436/9d Mohammad Ashraful 133 (190), Mehrab Hossain, Jr. 131 (345); Saqlain Sajib 3/98 (38.1 overs)		361 (111.5 overs); Junaid Siddique 78 (135); Elias Sunny 3/80 (25 overs)
		397/6 (84 overs); Nasir Hossain 131 (112); Mohammad Ashraful 3/65 (15 overs)

Match Drawn
Shaheed Chandu Stadium
Player of the match: Mohammad Ashraful (Central Zone)

2–5 January 2013
Scorecard

East Zone	v	South Zone
232 (65.3 overs); Nafees Iqbal 83 (116); Sohag Gazi 6/66 (20.3 overs)		248 (73 overs); Anamul Haque 74 (151); Yasin Arafat 4/50 (15 overs)
227 (72.1 overs); Nafees Iqbal 63 (124); Sohag Gazi 5/73 (28 overs)		248 (91 overs); Anamul Haque 73 (122); Nabil Samad 6/81 (37 overs)

South Zone won by 37 runs
Sher-e-Bangla Cricket Stadium
Player of the match: Sohag Gazi (South Zone)

8–11 January 2013
Scorecard

Central Zone	v	East Zone
655/7d (159.4 overs); Marshall Ayub 289 (367), Mehrab Hossain, Jr. 218 (388); Nabil Samad 4/161 (52.4 overs)		396/8 (107 overs); Faisal Hossain 92 (103); Shahadat Hossain 3/73 (17 overs)

Match Drawn
Shaheed Chandu Stadium
Player of the match: Marshall Ayub and Mehrab Hossain, Jr. (Central Zone)

8–11 January 2013
Scorecard

South Zone	v	North Zone
205 (47.4 overs); Soumya Sarkar 51 (93); Saqlain Sajib 6/74 (19.4 overs)		291 (88 overs); Sajidul Islam 76 (75); Ziaur Rahman 4/32 (14 overs)
278 (86.3 overs); Sohag Gazi 85 (59); Saqlain Sajib 4/90 (29 overs)		362/7d (81.4 overs); Mushfiqur Rahim 89 (162); Abdur Razzak 3/129 (38 overs)

North Zone won by 170 runs
Sher-e-Bangla Cricket Stadium
Player of the match: Saqlain Sajib (North Zone)

==== Final ====
22–26 February 2012
Scorecard

Central Zone	v	North Zone
227 (75.5 overs); Raqibul Hasan 125 (204); Farhad Reza 4/18 (11 overs)		274 (79.1 overs); Nasir Hossain 74 (88); Mosharraf Hossain 4/65 (24.1 overs)
247 (68 overs); Raqibul Hasan 68 (106); Sanjamul Islam 8/73 (20 overs)		219 (65.1 overs); Jahurul Islam 81 (133); Elias Sunny 3/26 (11 overs)

Central Zone won by 31 runs
Sher-e-Bangla Cricket Stadium
Player of the match: Raqibul Hasan (Central Zone) and Sanjamul Islam (North Zone)

== Other matches ==
Date	Type	Match	Result	Report
6 Sep 2012	Women's ODI	Bangladesh Women v South Africa Women	Bangladesh Women won by 2 wickets	Scorecard
7 Sep 2012	Women's ODI	Bangladesh Women v South Africa Women	South Africa Women won by 4 wickets	Scorecard
9 Sep 2012	Women's ODI	Bangladesh Women v South Africa Women	South Africa Women won by 7 wickets	Scorecard
11 Sep 2012	Women's T20	Bangladesh Women v South Africa Women	Bangladesh Women won by 7 wickets	Scorecard
12 Sep 2012	Women's T20	Bangladesh Women v South Africa Women	South Africa Women won by 6 wickets	Scorecard
14 Sep 2012	Women's T20	Bangladesh Women v South Africa Women	South Africa Women won by 16 runs	Scorecard
