= Mrittunjoy Chowdhury =

Bangladeshi cricketer (born 2001)

Personal information
- Full name: Mirttunjoy Chowdhury Nipun
- Born: 28 June 2001 (age 25); Satkhira, Bangladesh
- Batting: Left-handed
- Bowling: Left-arm medium-fast
- Role: Bowler

International information
- National side: Bangladesh
- Only ODI (cap 142): 14 May 2023 v Ireland
- Only T20I (cap 88): 6 October 2023 v India

Domestic team information
- Years: Team
- 2021: Shinepukur Cricket Club
- 2022: Chattogram Challengers (squad no. 159 formerly 125)
Medal record
Men's cricket
Representing Bangladesh
ICC U-19 World Cup
Winner	2020 South Africa
Asian Games
Bronze medal – third place	2022 Hangzhou	Team
- Source: Cricinfo, 14 May 2023

Mrittunjoy Chowdhury (born 28 June 2001) is a Bangladeshi cricketer. Chowdhury was part of Bangladesh's squad for the 2020 Under-19 Cricket World Cup, although he was later ruled out of the tournament with a shoulder injury. Due to his injury, the Bangladesh Cricket Board (BCB) sent Chowdhury to Australia for surgery.

== Early life ==
Chowdhury was born as Mrittyunjoy Chowdhury Nipun on 28 June 2001 in Kalaroa, Satkhira. His father Tahazzat Hossain Chowdhury was a cricket fan and aspired for his son to pursue a career in the sport. Mrittyunjoy has an elder brother.

== Career ==
In October 2020, Chowdhury was named in the Mahmudullah XI squad for the 2020–21 BCB President's Cup. He made his Twenty20 debut on 31 May 2021, for Shinepukur Cricket Club in the 2021 Dhaka Premier Division Twenty20 Cricket League. He made his first-class debut on 31 October 2021, for Khulna Division in the 2021–22 National Cricket League. He made his List A debut on 9 January 2022, for Central Zone in the 2021–22 Bangladesh Cricket League One Day tournament.

He was selected by the Chattogram Challengers during the players' draft for the 2021–22 Bangladesh Premier League (BPL). On 29 January 2022, He made his BPL debut against the Sylhet Sunrisers, taking a hat-trick in a winning cause and was named the player of the match.

In April 2023, he earned his maiden call-up to the Bangladesh cricket team for their One Day International (ODI) series against Ireland. He made his ODI debut in the third ODI of the series, on 14 May 2023.

He made his T20I debut against India in Asian Games semifinal on 6 October 2023.
