= Bangladesh Cricket League =

Bangladeshi cricket tournament

Bangladesh Cricket League (BCL)
- Countries: Bangladesh
- Administrator: Bangladesh Cricket Board
- Format: First-class
- First edition: 2012–13
- Latest edition: 2023–24
- Next edition: 2025–26
- Tournament format: Round-robin
- Number of teams: 4
- Current champion: East Zone (1st title)
- Most successful: South Zone (6 titles)
- BCL 2023-24

The Bangladesh Cricket League is an annual first-class cricket tournament that began in Bangladesh in the 2012–13 season.

== History ==
The Bangladesh Cricket League (BCL) was inaugurated in the 2012–13 season as a four-team first-class tournament comprising the best-performing players from the eight-team National Cricket League (NCL). The aim was to raise the level of the nation's top first-class competition to better prepare players for Test cricket.

The BCL consists of four zonal teams, each made up of players from teams representing two adjacent Divisions in the NCL. The teams are as follows:

- Central Zone: players from Dhaka Division and Mymensingh Division
- South Zone: players from Khulna Division and Barisal Division
- East Zone: players from Sylhet Division and Chittagong Division
- North Zone: players from Rajshahi Division and Rangpur Division

Each team is owned and officially named as a franchise: Islami Bank East Zone, for example. The matches are played on a limited number of nominally neutral grounds, without home and away matches.

== Winners and runners-up ==
Season	Winners	Runners-up	Source
2012–13	Central Zone	North Zone	
2013–14	South Zone	North Zone	
2014–15	South Zone	East Zone	
2015–16	Central Zone	East Zone	
2016–17	North Zone	South Zone	
2017–18	South Zone	North Zone	
2018–19	South Zone	East Zone	
2019–20	South Zone	East Zone	
2020–21	Not held		
2021–22	Central Zone	South Zone	
2022–23	South Zone	Central Zone	
2023–24	East Zone	Central Zone	
2024–25	Not held		

== Statistics by team ==
Team	Winners	Runners-up	Seasons won	Seasons runners-up
Prime Bank South Zone	6	2	2013–14, 2014–15, 2017–18, 2018–19, 2019–20, 2022–23	2016–17, 2021–22
Walton Central Zone	3	1	2012–13, 2015–16, 2021–22	2022–23
Islami Bank East Zone	1	4	2023–24	2014–15, 2015–16, 2018–19, 2019–20
BCB North Zone	1	3	2016–17	2012–13, 2013–14, 2017–18

== Seasons ==
=== 2012–13 ===
Team	Played	Won	Drawn	Lost	Points
Central Zone	3	0	3	0	14
North Zone	3	1	2	0	13
South Zone	3	1	1	1	10
East Zone	3	0	2	1	9

In the final, Central Zone beat North Zone by 31 runs. Sanjamul Islam (North Zone) took 8 for 73 in the second innings of the final, which remained the best bowling figures in the tournament until the 2016–17 season.

Matches took place from December 2012 to February 2013, at Mirpur (in Central Zone) and Bogra (in North Zone). The highest scorer was Marshall Ayub (Central Zone) (465 runs, average 77.50) and the leading wicket-takers were Sohag Gazi (South Zone) (19 wickets, average 24.47) and Mosharraf Hossain (Central Zone) (19 wickets, average 25.31). Marshall Ayub was named player of the tournament; he scored 289 against East Zone, which remains the highest individual score in the tournament.

=== 2013–14 ===
Team	Played	Won	Drawn	Lost	Points
North Zone	3	2	1	0	54
South Zone	3	1	1	1	41
Central Zone	3	1	1	1	34
East Zone	3	0	1	2	18

In the final South Zone beat North Zone by 213 runs.

Matches took place in January and May 2014, the round-robin matches at Bangladesh Krira Shikkha Protisthan cricket grounds 2, 3 and 4 in Savar, and the final at Mirpur (all in Central Zone). The highest scorer was Imrul Kayes (South Zone) (511 runs, average 73.00) and the leading wicket-taker was Taijul Islam (North Zone) (37 wickets, average 17.24). Taijul Islam was named player of the tournament.

=== 2014–15 ===
Team	Played	Won	Drawn	Lost	Points
South Zone	3	1	2	0	46
East Zone	3	1	2	0	40
Central Zone	3	1	1	1	33
North Zone	3	0	1	2	17

There was no final. Matches took place in April and May 2015, at Fatullah and Mirpur (both in Central Zone) and Chittagong (in East Zone). The highest scorer was Alok Kapali (East Zone) (408 runs, average 102.00) and the leading wicket-taker was Abdur Razzak (South Zone) (18 wickets, average 19.00).

In April 2015, the BCL staged a One-Day League, which was won by East Zone.

=== 2015–16 ===
Team	Played	Won	Drawn	Lost	Points
Central Zone	6	1	5	0	64
East Zone	6	1	5	0	53
North Zone	6	1	3	2	49
South Zone	6	0	5	1	41

There was no final. Instead of a single round-robin, as in previous years, a double round-robin was held from mid-January to mid-March 2016. Matches were played at Rajshahi and Bogra (both in North Zone), Cox's Bazar (East Zone), and Mirpur and Fatullah (both in Central Zone). The highest scorer was Marshall Ayub (Central Zone), with 562 runs at 56.20, while Abdur Razzak (South Zone) took the most wickets, 38 at 32.15.

=== 2016–17 ===
Team	Played	Won	Drawn	Lost	Points
North Zone	6	2	4	0	22
South Zone	6	1	5	0	16
East Zone	6	1	3	2	13
Central Zone	6	1	2	3	10

A double round-robin was held from late January to early March 2017. The highest scorer was Tushar Imran (South Zone), with 731 runs at 91.37, while Sunzamul Islam (North Zone), 25 wickets at 26.44, and Shuvagata Hom (Central Zone), 25 at 26.92, took the most wickets. Sunzamul Islam took 9 for 80, a competition record, in the second innings against Central Zone at Chittagong.

=== 2017–18 ===
Team	Played	Won	Drawn	Lost	Points
South Zone	6	1	5	0	65
North Zone	6	2	3	1	62
East Zone	6	0	5	1	52
Central Zone	6	0	5	1	51

The first three rounds were played in January 2018, and the last three in April, split by the 2017–18 season of the Dhaka Premier Division Cricket League. The highest scorer was Liton Das (East Zone), with 779 runs at 97.37, while Abdur Razzak (South Zone) was the leading wicket-taker with 43 wickets at 25.00. Both totals were new records for the competition.

=== 2018–19 ===
Team	Played	Won	Drawn	Lost	Points
South Zone	6	2	3	1	31.88
East Zone	6	1	5	0	29.14
Central Zone	6	1	3	2	23.37
North Zone	6	0	5	1	18.61

The tournament was played in November and December 2018. The highest scorer was Anamul Haque (South Zone), with 658 runs at 65.80, while Abdur Razzak (South Zone) was once again the leading wicket-taker with 34 wickets at 24.88.

=== 2019–20 ===
Team	Played	Won	Drawn	Lost	Points
East Zone	3	2	0	1	23.47
South Zone	3	1	2	0	19.89
Central Zone	3	1	1	1	11.50
North Zone	3	0	1	2	6.22

In the final, South Zone beat East Zone by 105 runs. The tournament was played from late January to late February 2020. The highest scorer was again Anamul Haque (South Zone), with 501 runs, while Abdur Razzak (South Zone) was once again the leading wicket-taker with 22 wickets.

=== 2021–22 ===
Team	Played	Won	Drawn	Lost	Points
South Zone	3	1	2	0	12
Central Zone	3	1	1	1	11
North Zone	3	1	1	1	10
East Zone	3	1	0	2	8

In the final, Central Zone beat South Zone by four wickets. The round-robin matches were played in December 2021 and the final in January 2022. The highest scorer was Mithun Ali (Central Zone), with 468 runs, while Hasan Murad (Central Zone) was the leading wicket-taker with 22 wickets.

=== 2022–23 ===
Team	Played	Won	Drawn	Lost	Points
Central Zone	3	2	0	1	19
South Zone	3	2	1	0	18
East Zone	3	0	2	1	4
North Zone	3	0	1	2	2

In the final, South Zone defeated Central Zone by an innings and 33 runs. The highest scorer in the tournament was Jaker Ali with 492, and the highest wicket-taker was Nazmul Islam with 19 wickets.

=== 2023–24 ===
Team	Pld	W	L	D	A	NRR	Pts
East Zone	3	2	0	1	0	1.901	5
Central Zone	3	1	1	1	0	1.114	3
North Zone	3	0	1	2	0	0.793	2
South Zone	3	0	1	2	0	0.605	2

- Champion

In Round 3, East Zone defeated North Zone by an innings and 112 runs. They finished the league as the table-toppers with 20 points, and clinched their maiden BCL title.

=== 2025–26 ===
There was no tournament of the Bangladesh Cricket League in the 2024–25 season. It returned in the 2025–26 season, beginning on 21 April 2026.
