= Shadman Islam =

Bangladeshi cricketer (born 1995)

Personal information
- Full name: Shadman Islam Anik
- Born: 18 May 1995 (age 31); Dhaka, Bangladesh
- Batting: Left-handed
- Bowling: Slow left-arm orthodox
- Role: Opening batter

International information
- National side: Bangladesh (2018–present)
- Test debut (cap 94): 30 November 2018 v West Indies
- Last Test: 13 August 2026 v Australia

Domestic team information
- Years: Team
- 2014-2025: Dhaka Metropolis
- 2025–present: Dhaka Division
- 2015, 2017: Dhaka Dynamites
- 2019: Chittagong Vikings
- 2019-20: Rangpur Rangers
- 2025–26: Chattogram Royals

Career statistics
Competition	Test	FC	LA	T20
Matches	29	101	95	28
Runs scored	1,497	6,829	3,427	456
Batting average	28.78	42.94	39.39	19.82
100s/50s	2/8	14/39	3/24	1/1
Top score	120	250	144*	101
Catches/stumpings	29/–	76/–	33/–	13/–
- Source: ESPNcricinfo, 16 August 2025

Shadman Islam Anik (Bengali: সাদমান ইসলাম অনিক; born 18 May 1995) is a Bangladeshi left-handed opening batter who has played 27 Test matches for Bangladesh since 2018. in domestic first-class cricket, he has represented Dhaka Metropolis, Dhaka Division and East Zone.

== Domestic career ==
In May 2017, Shadman scored his first List A century, playing for Abahani Limited in the 2016–17 Dhaka Premier Division Cricket League.

Shadman was the leading run-scorer for Central Zone in the 2017–18 Bangladesh Cricket League, with 500 runs in six matches. In October 2018, he was named in the squad for the Chittagong Vikings team, following the draft for the 2018–19 Bangladesh Premier League. He was also the leading run-scorer in the 2018–19 National Cricket League, with 648 runs in six matches.

Shadman was the leading run-scorer for Shinepukur Cricket Club in the 2018–19 Dhaka Premier Division Cricket League tournament, with 379 runs in 8 matches. In August 2019, he was one of 35 cricketers named in a training camp ahead of Bangladesh's 2019–20 season.

== International career ==
In November 2018, Shadman was added to Bangladesh's Test squad for the series against the West Indies. He made his Test debut against the West Indies on 30 November 2018, scoring 76 runs in his debut match. In July 2021, in the one-off match against Zimbabwe, Shadman scored his maiden century in Test cricket, with an unbeaten 115 runs in the second innings.

In November 2021 he was named in the Bangladesh squad for the two-match Test series against Pakistan. He struggled for form in the series, only managing to score 20 runs in 4 innings. His poor from continued in the series against New Zealand where he scored only 53 runs in 4 innings. He couldn't manage to score runs in the first Test against South Africa. As a result, he was dropped from the playing eleven for the next match and was also dropped from the Bangladesh Test squad for the Sri Lanka series.

=== Return to the National side ===
He made his comeback in the squad of Bangladesh for the series against Ireland. In August 2024 he was named in the Bangladesh Test Squad for Pakistan tour. In the first test, Shadman was included in the eleven after two and half a year due to the injury of Mahmudul Hasan Joy. In the first innings he scored 93 runs, narrowly missing out on a century. Bangladesh went on to win the first test in their ever first test victory over Pakistan. In the second test, he scored 10 and 24 as Bangladesh won the series 2–0.

In September 2024 Bangladesh toured India for 2 tests and 3 T20Is. In the 1st innings of 1st test he was bowled out for just 2 runs. In the 2nd innings he scored 35 runs but his team lost by 280 runs. His team also lost the second test by 7 wickets. Despite his teams terrible defeat in the second test Shadman scored a fifty in the 2nd innings and also became the first Bangladeshi opener to score a test fifty on Indian soil.

He continued to score runs in the West Indies tour of Bangladesh. He didn't played the first test of the West Indies tour of Bangladesh. In the second test he scored 64 runs in 1st innings. In the second innings he narrowly missed a fifty as he was got out on 46. Bangladesh went to win the second test. Bangladesh's victory was their first in the West Indies since 2009.

=== 2025-present ===
On 6 April 2025 he was added to the Bangladesh squad for the two-match Test series against Zimbabwe. In the second test he scored his second Test century, he scored 120 runs off 181 deliveries including 16 fours and 1 six.

In the Sri Lanka tour of Bangladesh he scored 14 and 76 runs in the 1st and 2nd innings of the first test respectively. He scored 46 and 12 in the 2nd test.

== Personal life ==
Shadman married Nasha Walid in July 2020 during the coronavirus pandemic. Nasha was a student of Computer science and engineering in North South University.

== International centuries ==
Test centuries by Shadman Islam
No.	Runs	Against	Venue	H/A	Date	Result	Ref
1	115*	Zimbabwe	Harare Sports Club, Harare	Away	10 July 2021	Won	
2	120	Zimbabwe	Bir Shreshtha Shaheed Flight Lieutenant Matiur Rahman Cricket Stadium, Chittagong	Home	29 April 2025	Won	
