= Ariful Haque (cricketer) =

Bangladeshi cricketer

Personal information
- Born: 18 November 1992 (age 33); Rangpur, Bangladesh
- Batting: Right-handed
- Bowling: Right-arm medium-fast
- Role: Batting all-rounder

International information
- National side: Bangladesh
- Test debut (cap 89): 3 November 2018 v Zimbabwe
- Last Test: 11 November 2018 v Zimbabwe
- Only ODI (cap 130): 26 October 2018 v Zimbabwe
- T20I debut (cap 59): 15 February 2018 v Sri Lanka
- Last T20I: 22 December 2018 v West Indies

Domestic team information
- Years: Team
- 2006–present: Barisal Division
- 2023–present: Sylhet Strikers

Career statistics
Competition	Test	ODI	FC	LA
Matches	2	1	96	120
Runs scored	88	–	4,557	2,380
Batting average	29.33	–	34.52	26.15
100s/50s	0/0	–	8/25	2/9
Top score	41*	–	231	109
Balls bowled	66	18	8,042	2,351
Wickets	1	0	127	73
Bowling average	24.00	–	35.17	31.90
5 wickets in innings	0	–	2	1
10 wickets in match	0	–	0	0
Best bowling	1/10	–	6/41	5/38
Catches/stumpings	2/–	0/–	68/–	60/–
Medal record
Representing Bangladesh
Men's Cricket
South Asian Games
Gold medal – first place	2010 Dhaka	Team
- Source: ESPNcricinfo, 21 May 2022

Ariful Haque (Bengali: আরিফুল হক; born 18 November 1992) is a Bangladeshi cricketer. He made his first-class cricket debut in the 2006/07 season and his international debut for the Bangladesh cricket team in February 2018.

== Domestic career ==
Ariful made his first-class debut for Barisal Division in the 2006/07 season.

Ariful was the leading wicket-taker for Central Zone in the 2017–18 Bangladesh Cricket League, with sixteen dismissals in six matches.

In October 2018, Ariful scored his maiden double-century in first-class cricket, batting for Rangpur Division in the 2018–19 National Cricket League. Later the same month, he was named in the Khulna Titans team, following the draft for the 2018–19 Bangladesh Premier League. In August 2019, he was one of 35 cricketers named in a training camp ahead of Bangladesh's 2019–20 season. In November 2019, he was selected to play for the Dhaka Platoon in the 2019–20 Bangladesh Premier League.

== International career ==
In February 2018, Ariful was named in Bangladesh's Twenty20 International (T20I) squad for their series against Sri Lanka. He made his T20I debut for Bangladesh against Sri Lanka on 15 February 2018.

In August 2018, Ariful was one of twelve debutants to be selected for a 31-man preliminary squad for Bangladesh ahead of the 2018 Asia Cup. Later that month, he was named in Bangladesh's fifteen-man squad for the tournament, but he did not play.

In October 2018, Ariful was named in Bangladesh's One Day International (ODI) and Test squads for their series against Zimbabwe. He made his ODI debut for Bangladesh against Zimbabwe on 26 October 2018. He made his Test debut for Bangladesh, also against Zimbabwe, on 3 November 2018.
