= Tushar Imran =

Bangladeshi cricketer (born 1983)

Personal information
- Full name: Sheikh Tushar Imran
- Born: 10 December 1983 (age 42); Kharki, Jessore, Khulna, Bangladesh
- Batting: Right-handed
- Bowling: Right-arm medium pace
- Role: Batsman

International information
- National side: Bangladesh (2001–2007)
- Test debut (cap 28): 28 July 2002 v Sri Lanka
- Last Test: 11 July 2007 v Sri Lanka
- ODI debut (cap 55): 23 November 2001 v Zimbabwe
- Last ODI: 31 December 2007 v New Zealand
- ODI shirt no.: 55 (previously 5)

Domestic team information
- Years: Team
- 2001–2021: Khulna Division

Career statistics
Competition	Test	ODI	FC	LA
Matches	5	41	182	173
Runs scored	89	574	11,972	4,439
Batting average	8.90	14.35	42.75	27.91
100s/50s	0/0	0/2	32/63	1/30
Top score	28	65	220	106*
Balls bowled	60	126	2,853	1,436
Wickets	0	1	30	27
Bowling average	–	103.00	50.83	39.26
5 wickets in innings	–	0	0	0
10 wickets in match	–	0	0	0
Best bowling	–	1/24	3/22	4/26
Catches/stumpings	1/–	6/–	83/–	49/–
- Source: Cricinfo, 25 December 2025

Sheikh Tushar Imran (born 10 December 1983) is a Bangladeshi cricket coach and former right-handed batter who played 5 Tests and 41 One Day Internationals (ODIs) for Bangladesh from 2001 to 2007. Playing also for Khulna Division from 2001 to 2021, he became the first player from his country to score 10,000 runs in first-class cricket. Imran worked as a coach for Sylhet Strikers in the 2023 and 2025 Bangladesh Premier League (BPL) seasons, and Chattogram Challengers in the 2024 season.

== Career ==
Imran first hit the headlines aged just 17 when he made 131 from 106 balls in a domestic match for his side Khulna Division in 2000–01. This was the same season in which Bangladesh were granted Test status and although he had to wait a while to join the Test team he made his ODI debut in 2001.

His Test debut came against Sri Lanka at Colombo on July 28, 2002. He made 8 and 28 as Bangladesh were defeated by 288 runs. In order to play the game he had edged out three former Bangladeshi captains in Naimur Rahman, Akram Khan and Aminul Islam which showed that the selectors were willing to invest in him.

He has so far struggled in the international stage but is a regular for Bangladesh A who he captains. He was first part of a Bangladesh A tour when they went England in the summer of 2005. Imran impressed with a run-a-ball 70 against Surrey.

In December 2016, during the 2016–17 National Cricket League, he scored his 19th century, the most first-class hundreds by a Bangladeshi. He was the top run-scorer in the 2016–17 Bangladesh Cricket League, with a total of 731 runs.

In January 2018, during the 2017–18 Bangladesh Cricket League, he scored his 10,000th run in first-class cricket. He became the first Bangladesh player to reach this landmark. He was the leading run-scorer for Central Zone in the 2017–18 Bangladesh Cricket League, with 725 runs in six matches.

In October 2018, during the 2018–19 National Cricket League, he became the first batsman to score seven centuries in the same year in domestic cricket in Bangladesh. He finished the tournament as the leading run-scorer for Khulna Division in the tournament, with 518 runs in five matches.

In November 2021, he announced his retirement from first-class and international cricket.

== Coaching career ==
After his retirement, he started coaching various clubs and franchise in Bangladeshi Domestic Circuit. He was the head coach of Sheikh Jamal Dhanmondi Club from 2022 to 2024.

He became the batting coach of Sylhet Strikers for BPL 2023. In 2024, he became the Head Coach of Chattogram Challengers in BPL 2024. He was praised both by fans and the management when he was in Chattogram.

In 2024, he came back to Sylhet Strikers and became their batting coach for BPL 2025.

Tushar Imran also coached the Bangladesh Under 17 team and Bangladesh HP team in 2024.

He was also rejected as batting coach of Bangladesh Cricket Team, as he submitted his application late.
