= Kamrul Islam Rabbi =

Bangladeshi cricketer

Kamrul Islam
Personal information
- Full name: Kamrul Islam Rabbi
- Born: 10 December 1991 (age 34); Patuakhali, Barisal, Bangladesh
- Batting: Right-handed
- Bowling: Right arm medium-fast
- Role: Bowler

International information
- National side: Bangladesh (2016–2018)
- Test debut (cap 79): 20 October 2016 v England
- Last Test: 12 July 2018 v West Indies

Domestic team information
- Years: Team
- 2008/09–: Barisal Division
- 2012/13: South Zone
- 2013/14: Cricket Coaching School
- 2014/15–: East Zone
- 2014/15–: Victoria Sporting Club
- 2015/16: Comilla Victorians
- 2016/17: Barisal Bulls

Career statistics
Competition	Test	FC	LA	T20
Matches	7	107	113	103
Runs scored	51	1,310	371	237
Batting average	5.66	11.10	10.91	13.94
100s/50s	0/0	0/4	0/0	0/0
Top score	25*	63	29	39*
Balls bowled	750	14,777	4,947	1,792
Wickets	8	233	145	122
Bowling average	63.00	36.87	32.49	21.22
5 wickets in innings	0	3	2	0
10 wickets in match	0	0	0	0
Best bowling	3/87	6/24	5/24	4/10
Catches/stumpings	0/–	34/–	25/–	22/–
- Source: ESPNCricinfo, 19 July 2025

Kamrul Islam Rabbi (Bengali: কামরুল ইসলাম রাব্বি; born 10 December 1991) is a Bangladeshi cricketer who has played for Barisal Division from the 2008–09 season. He is a right-handed batsman and a right-arm medium-fast bowler.

== Domestic career ==
Rabbi made his first-class debut in October 2008 against Sylhet Division. He did not bat in the match, and bowled sixteen overs, taking figures of 3/33. He played for Barisal Burners in the Bangladesh Premier League.

His best first-class bowling figures are 5 for 65 for Barisal Division against Chittagong Division in 2012–13.

In October 2018, he was named in the squad for the Rajshahi Kings, following the draft for the 2018–19 Bangladesh Premier League. He was the leading wicket-taker for Gazi Group Cricketers in the 2018–19 Dhaka Premier Division Cricket League tournament, with 17 dismissals in 11 matches. In November 2019, he was selected to play for the Rajshahi Royals in the 2019–20 Bangladesh Premier League.

On 8 December 2020, in the 2020–21 Bangabandhu T20 Cup, Rabbi took a hat-trick, bowling for Fortune Barishal against Minister Group Rajshahi.

== International career ==
In November 2015, he was named in the One Day International squad for Bangladesh's series against Zimbabwe.

On 20 October 2016, he made his Test debut against England. In August 2018, he was one of twelve debutants to be selected for a 31-man preliminary squad for Bangladesh ahead of the 2018 Asia Cup. In November 2021, he was named in Bangladesh's Twenty20 International (T20I) squad for their series against Pakistan
