= Zakir Hasan (cricketer, born 1998) =

Bangladeshi cricketer (born 1998)

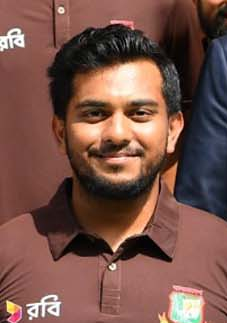

Personal information
- Full name: Mohammad Zakir Hasan
- Born: 1 February 1998 (age 28); Sylhet City, Bangladesh
- Batting: Left-handed
- Role: Opening Batter, Wicket-keeper

International information
- National side: Bangladesh (2018–present)
- Test debut (cap 101): 14 December 2022 v India
- Last Test: 22 November 2024 v West Indies
- ODI debut (cap 147): 26 September 2023 v New Zealand
- Last ODI: 11 November 2024 v Afghanistan
- T20I debut (cap 61): 15 February 2018 v Sri Lanka
- Last T20I: 7 October 2023 v Pakistan

Domestic team information
- Years: Team
- 2015–present: Sylhet Division
- 2016: Chittagong Vikings
- 2017-2019: Rajshahi Kings
- 2019-20: Rangpur Rangers
- 2022: Chattogram Challengers
- 2023-2025: Sylhet Strikers
- 2026-present: Sylhet Titans

Career statistics
Competition	Test	ODI	T20I	FC
Matches	13	2	4	103
Runs scored	593	5	11	6,104
Batting average	23.72	2.50	2.75	38.15
100s/50s	1/4	0/0	0/0	16/26
Top score	100	4	10	213
Catches/stumpings	11/–	1/–	1/–	114/9
Medal record
Men's cricket
Representing Bangladesh
Asian Games
Bronze medal – third place	2022 Hangzhou	Team
South Asian Games
Gold medal – first place	2019 Kathmandu/Pokhara	Team
- Source: Cricinfo, 9 December 2025

Mohammad Zakir Hasan (born 1 February 1998) is a Bangladeshi cricketer who plays for Sylhet Division. He made his international debut for the Bangladesh cricket team in February 2018.

== Domestic career ==
Zakir made his first-class debut on 18 September 2015 in the National Cricket League. In December 2015, he was named in Bangladesh's squad for the 2016 Under-19 Cricket World Cup. He made his Twenty20 (T20) debut on 8 November 2016 playing for Chittagong Vikings in the 2016–17 Bangladesh Premier League.

In January 2018, Zakir scored 211 batting for East Zone against Central Zone, in the 2017–18 Bangladesh Cricket League, his maiden double century in first-class cricket.

=== Bangladesh Premier League ===
==== Chittagong Vikings ====
He made his debut in 2016 BPL for the Chittagong Vikings. He didn't have a good season. He scored only 32 runs in five innings at an average of 8.00. His highest score was 9*.

==== Rajshahi Kings ====
In the next season he was selected to play for the Rajshahi Kings. He scored 169 in 8 innings with an average of 24.14 including 1 fifty.

In October 2018, Zakir was named in the squad for the Rajshahi Kings, following the draft for the 2018–19 Bangladesh Premier League. He scored 126 runs in 8 innings in an average of 18.00. His highest score was 42*.

==== Rangpur Rangers ====
In the 2019–20 Bangladesh Premier League, Zakir was selected to play for the Rangpur Rangers. He played just one match but didn't get a chance to bat.

==== Chattogram Challengers ====
He played the 2021–22 Bangladesh Premier League for the Chattogram Challengers. He scored 38 runs in four innings in an average of 9.50. His highest score was 20.

==== Sylhet Strikers ====
He was selected to play for the Sylhet Strikers in the 2023 BPL. He scored 251 runs in 15 innings in an average of 17.92 including two fifties.

He was retained by the Sylhet Strikers for the 2024 BPL. He scored 224 runs in 12 innings in an average of 20.36 including a half century.

He was signed by the Sylhet Strikers for the 2025 BPL. He scored 389 runs in 12 innings in an average of 35.36 including three half centuries.

==== Sylhet Titans ====
In the 2026 Bangladesh Premier League player auction Zakir was bought by Sylhet Titans for ৳22 lakh.

== International career ==
In February 2018, Zakir was named in Bangladesh's Twenty20 International (T20I) squad for their series against Sri Lanka. He made his T20I debut for Bangladesh against Sri Lanka on 15 February 2018.

In August 2018, Zakir was one of twelve debutants to be selected for a 31-man preliminary squad for Bangladesh ahead of the 2018 Asia Cup.

In December 2018, he was named in Bangladesh's team for the 2018 ACC Emerging Teams Asia Cup. In November 2019, he was named in Bangladesh's squad for the 2019 ACC Emerging Teams Asia Cup in Bangladesh. Later the same month, he was selected to play for the Rangpur Rangers in the 2019–20 Bangladesh Premier League, and he was named in Bangladesh's squad for the men's cricket tournament at the 2019 South Asian Games. The Bangladesh team won the gold medal, after they beat Sri Lanka by seven wickets in the final.

On 14 December 2022, during India tour of Bangladesh, he made his Test debut against India and on 17 December he scored his maiden Test century of his career while batting in the second innings of first Test. He became fourth Bangladesh player to score a century on Test debut.

In August 2024, he was selected in Bangladesh's test squad for the two-match series against Pakistan.

== International centuries ==
Test centuries by Zakir Hasan
No.	Runs	Against	Venue	H/A	Date	Result	Ref
1	100	India	Bir Shrestho Flight Lieutenant Matiur Rahman Cricket Stadium, Chittagong	Home	17 December 2022	Lost	
