= Raqibul Hasan (cricketer, born 1987) =

Bangladeshi cricketer (born 1987)

Personal information
- Full name: Mohammed Raqibul Hasan
- Born: 8 October 1987 (age 39); Jamalpur, Bangladesh
- Nickname: Nirala
- Height: 5 ft 9 in (1.75 m)
- Batting: Right-handed
- Bowling: Right-arm leg break
- Role: Batsman

International information
- National side: Bangladesh
- Test debut (cap 54): 26 November 2008 v South Africa
- Last Test: 29 October 2011 v West Indies
- ODI debut (cap 89): 9 March 2008 v South Africa
- Last ODI: 11 April 2011 v Australia
- T20I debut (cap 22): 5 November 2008 v South Africa
- Last T20I: 3 February 2010 v New Zealand

Domestic team information
- Years: Team
- 2004–2011: Barisal Division
- 2011–present: Dhaka Division
- 2012–present: Dhaka Gladiators

Career statistics
Competition	Test	ODI	FC	LA
Matches	9	55	128	221
Runs scored	336	1,308	7,021	6,795
Batting average	19.76	27.82	35.45	37.13
100s/50s	0/1	0/8	11/37	7/44
Top score	65	89	313*	190
Balls bowled	42	–	611	368
Wickets	1	–	7	9
Bowling average	17.00	–	54.28	31.55
5 wickets in innings	0	–	0	0
10 wickets in match	0	–	0	0
Best bowling	1/0	–	1/0	3/29
Catches/stumpings	9/–	18/–	101/–	68/–
- Source: ESPNcricinfo, 17 April 2025

Raqibul Hasan (Bengali: রকিবুল হাসান; born 8 October 1987) is a Bangladeshi international cricketer who also plays for Dhaka Division. He played in the 2006 U-19 Cricket World Cup in Sri Lanka and in 2007 became the first Bangladeshi cricketer to score a triple hundred in first-class cricket when Barisal played Sylhet Division in March 2007. Another notable achievement was a century on his first-class debut, for Bangladesh A against Zimbabwe A in February 2005. He represented Bangladesh in the 2011 Cricket World Cup.

== Career ==
He made his One Day International debut for Bangladesh against South Africa in Chittagong in March 2008, where batting at number six in the order, he made 15 runs. In his second match against the same opponents, he scored 63 before hitting 89 against India in the Kitply Cup. Another half-century followed against Sri Lanka in the Asia Cup.

He made his Test debut against South Africa in November 2008.

On 10 March 2010, Raqibul Hasan announced his shock retirement from international cricket. Although he had secured his place in Bangladesh's Test squad, Raqibul Hasan's decision was made in protest over his exclusion from the ODI team that faced England and from Bangladesh's squad for the 2010 T20 World Cup. A week later, Raqibul Hasan went back on his decision but his contract with the Bangladesh Cricket Board (BCB) was terminated and he was told he wouldn't be considered available to play for his country for three months.

Raqibul Hasan returned to the Bangladesh squad in June 2010 when he was called up for his country's tour of England. His comeback from retirement lasted just one match before he was sidelined with injury. Raqibul Hasan returned to the Bangladesh team on 8 July in the first ODI against England at Trent Bridge. He made 76 in his team's innings before being struck on the foot by a delivery from James Anderson. A runner was sent for, but Raqibul Hasan was run out without facing another ball. After the match it emerged that Raqibul's toe was broken and that he would miss the rest of the tour. When the BCB announced its list of central contracts in November 2010, Raqibul has given a grade C contract.

When the squad to tour Zimbabwe for a Test and five ODIs was announced in July 2011, Mohammad Ashraful and Raqibul Hasan were competing for the same place; Ashraful was chosen over Raqibul Hasan due to his greater experience. In April 2012 the BCB announced its contracts for the coming year and Raqibul Hasan's central contract was not renewed.

He was the leading run-scorer for Mohammedan Sporting Club in the 2018–19 Dhaka Premier Division Cricket League tournament, with 781 runs in 16 matches. In November 2019, he was selected to play for the Dhaka Platoon in the 2019–20 Bangladesh Premier League.
