= Shamsur Rahman (cricketer) =

Bangladeshi cricketer (born 1994)

Personal information
- Full name: Mohammad Shamsur Rahman
- Born: 5 June 1988 (age 38); Comilla, Bangladesh
- Nickname: Shuvo
- Height: 5 ft 8 in (1.73 m)
- Batting: Right-handed
- Bowling: Right arm offbreak
- Role: Batsman

International information
- National side: Bangladesh
- Test debut (cap 71): 27 January 2014 v Sri Lanka
- Last Test: 3 November 2014 v Zimbabwe
- ODI debut (cap 108): 31 October 2013 v New Zealand
- Last ODI: 22 August 2014 v West Indies
- T20I debut (cap 36): 31 March 2013 v New Zealand
- Last T20I: 27 August 2014 v West Indies

Domestic team information
- Years: Team
- 2012: Chittagong Kings
- 2013, 2017: Rangpur Riders
- 2015: Dhaka Dynamites
- 2016: Barisal Bulls
- 2019: Comilla Victorians
- 2019-20: Khulna Tigers
- 2022: Minister Dhaka
- 2023-2024: Sylhet Strikers

Career statistics
Competition	Test	ODI	FC	LA
Matches	6	10	155	185
Runs scored	305	266	9,468	5,454
Batting average	25.41	26.60	36.98	31.89
100s/50s	1/0	0/2	23/46	6/36
Top score	106	96	267	144*
Balls bowled	6	6	1,714	1,258
Wickets	0	0	24	22
Bowling average	–	–	43.50	47.09
5 wickets in innings	–	–	1	0
10 wickets in match	–	–	0	0
Best bowling	–	–	5/69	2/7
Catches/stumpings	7/–	3/–	130/–	74/3
Medal record
Representing Bangladesh
Men's Cricket
Asian Games
Gold medal – first place	2010 Guangzhou	Team
Bronze medal – third place	2014 Incheon	Team
- Source: Cricinfo, 15 June 2025

Mohammad Shamsur Rahman (born 5 June 1994) is a Bangladeshi cricketer who plays as a right-handed batsman. He has represented Bangladesh at international level. He is also known by his nickname Shuvo.

== Early and domestic career ==
Between 2004 and 2006, Shamsur Rahman represented the Bangladesh under-19 team in both Under-19 Tests and One-Day International matches. In 2006, he was a member of the Bangladesh squad at the 2006 Under-19 Cricket World Cup.

Shamsur Rahman made his first-class debut in 2005 playing for the Bangladesh Cricket Board President's XI against the touring Zimbabwean team.

He made his debut for Khulna Division in 2005/06 and moved on to Dhaka Division in 2006/07. He also appeared for the Bangladesh Cricket Board President's XI in 2004/05 and Bangladesh A in the same season and represented his country in various age group teams, including in Under 19 'Test' and One Day International matches.

In January 2014, Shamsur Rahman played an innings of 247 runs, the third highest first-class score in Bangladesh at that point. Shortly after this, he was selected in the Bangladesh Test team, making his debut on 27 January against Sri Lanka.

He was the leading run-scorer for Mohammedan Sporting Club in the 2017–18 Dhaka Premier Division Cricket League, with 458 runs in 11 matches.

In October 2018, he was named in the squad for the Comilla Victorians team, following the draft for the 2018–19 Bangladesh Premier League. He was the leading run-scorer for Gazi Group Cricketers in the 2018–19 Dhaka Premier Division Cricket League tournament, with 374 runs in 11 matches. In November 2019, he was selected to play for the Khulna Tigers in the 2019–20 Bangladesh Premier League.

== International career ==
He made his Twenty20 international debut on 31 March 2013 against Sri Lanka at Pallekelle.
