= Irfan Shukkur =

Bangladeshi cricketer (born 1993)

Personal information
- Full name: Irfan Sukkur
- Born: 22 May 1993 (age 33); Chittagong, Bangladesh
- Height: 1.83 m (6 ft 0 in)
- Batting: Left-handed
- Role: Wicket-keeper

Domestic team information
- Years: Team
- 2019–2020: Rajshahi Royals
- 2023: Chattogram Challengers
- 2024: Durdanto Dhaka
- 2025: Rangpur Riders

Career statistics
Competition	FC	LA	T20
Matches	93	123	68
Runs scored	3,852	3,538	1,023
Batting average	27.12	34.34	19.67
100s/50s	2/25	3/22	0/6
Top score	104*	107*	68*
Catches/stumpings	173/29	97/24	28/11
- Source: ESPN Cricinfo, 29 October 2025

Irfan Shukkur (born 22 May 1993) is a Bangladeshi first-class and List A cricket player. He was born in Chittagong, Bangladesh. In November 2019, he was selected to play for the Rajshahi Royals in the 2019–20 Bangladesh Premier League. His 53-run innings was the highest score for Rajshahi Royals in the final of 2019–20 Bangladesh Premier League.
