= East Zone cricket team (Bangladesh) =

Cricket team

East Zone
Personnel
- Captain: Irfan Shukkur

Team information
- Established: 2012

History
- BCL wins: 1

The East Zone cricket team or Islami Bank East Zone is a first class cricket team that represents eastern Bangladesh in the Bangladesh Cricket League (BCL). It is a composite team of two Bangladeshi first-class teams: Chittagong Division and Sylhet Division. East Zone has played in the BCL from the opening 2012–13 season.

In January 2018, they scored 735 runs for 6 wickets in their first innings against Central Zone in the 2017–18 Bangladesh Cricket League. This was the third-highest total in first-class cricket in Bangladesh and the second-highest total in the history of the Bangladesh Cricket League.

In Round 3 of 2023–24 Bangladesh Cricket League, East Zone defeated North Zone by an innings and 112 runs. They finished the league as the table-toppers with 20 points, and clinched their maiden BCL title.

== Current squad ==
- Irfan Shukkur (c) (wk)
- Shykat Ali
- Amite Hasan
- Jaker Ali
- Nasum Ahmed
- Yasir Ali
- Parvez Hossain Emon
- Shamsur Rahman
- Rejaur Rahman Raja
- Tanzim Hasan Sakib
- Nayeem Ahmed
- Shamim Hossain
- Abu Jayed Rahi
- Khaled Ahmed
- Mominul Haque
- Zakir Hasan
- Shahadat Hossain
