= Abu Jayed =

Bangladeshi cricketer

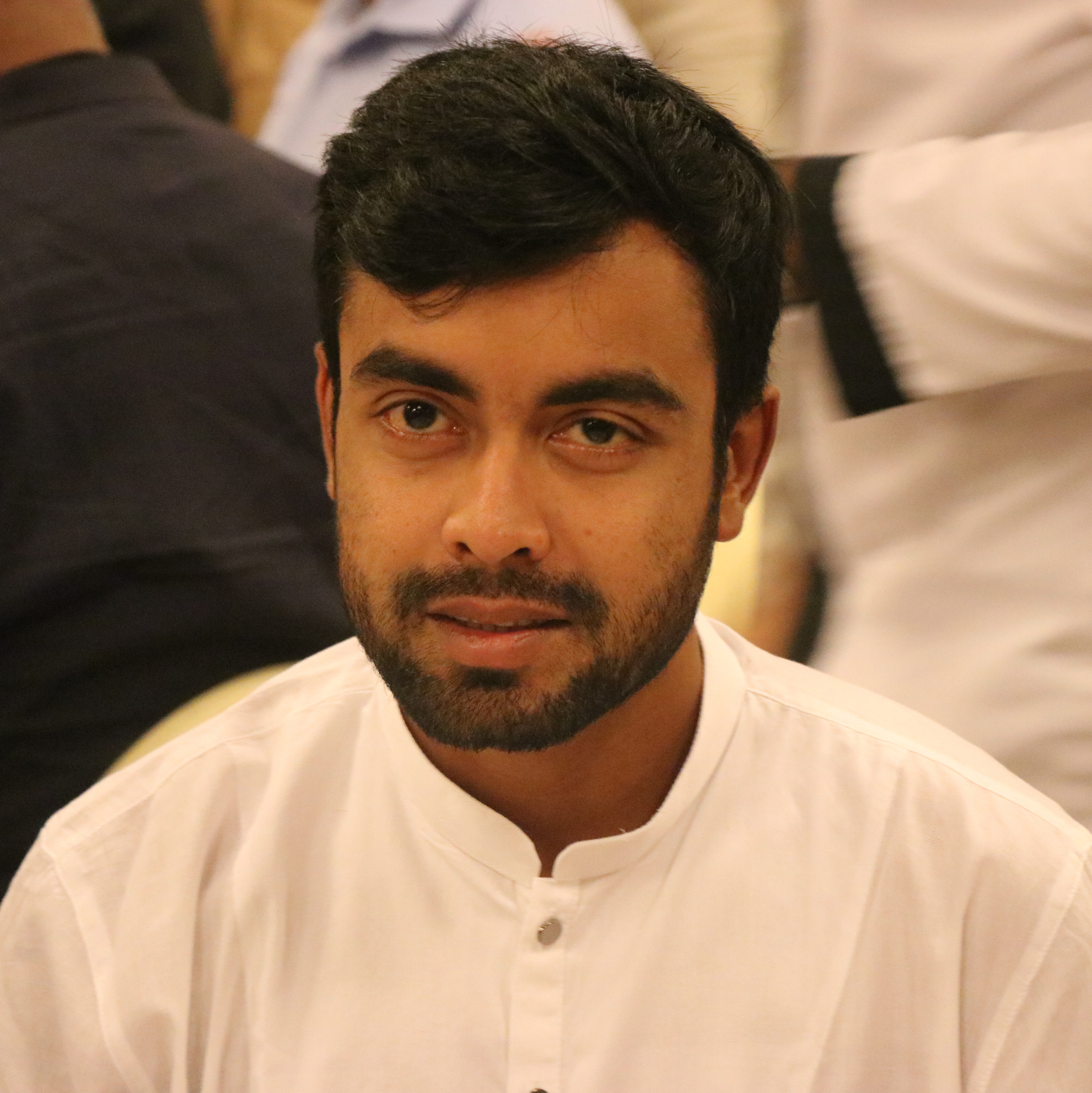
- Abu Jayed in 2018

Personal information
- Full name: Abu Jayed Chowdhury Rahi
- Born: 2 August 1993 (age 33); Sylhet, Bangladesh
- Batting: Right-handed
- Bowling: Right-arm medium-fast

International information
- National side: Bangladesh (2018–present)
- Test debut (cap 88): 4 July 2018 v Pakistan
- Last Test: 26 November 2021 v Pakistan
- ODI debut (cap 131): 13 May 2019 v West Indies
- Last ODI: 15 May 2019 v Ireland
- T20I debut (cap 62): 18 February 2018 v Sri Lanka
- Last T20I: 7 June 2018 v Bangladesh

Domestic team information
- Years: Team
- 2012: Sylhet Division
- 2020: Fortune Barishal

Career statistics
Competition	Test	ODI
Matches	9	2
Runs scored	27	-
Batting average	2.70	-
100s/50s	0/0	-
Top score	7*	-
Balls bowled	1,370	108
Wickets	24	5
Bowling average	31.29	20.80
5 wickets in innings	0	1
10 wickets in match	0	0
Best bowling	4/71	5/58
Catches/stumpings	1/–	18/–
- Source: ESPNcricinfo, 26 November 2021

Abu Jayed Chowdhury Rahi (Bengali: আবু জায়েদ চৌধুরী রাহী; born 2 August 1993) is a Bangladeshi cricketer who plays for Sylhet Division. He made his international debut in February 2018, in a Twenty20 International against Sri Lanka. In April 2019, he was named in Bangladesh's One Day International (ODI) squad for the 2019 Cricket World Cup, despite being uncapped in an ODI match. He made his ODI debut for Bangladesh the following month, against the West Indies.

== Domestic career ==
He was the leading wicket-taker in the 2016–17 National Cricket League tournament, with 29 dismissals.

In October 2018, he was named in the squad for the Chittagong Vikings team, following the draft for the 2018–19 Bangladesh Premier League. He was the leading wicket-taker for the team in the tournament, with eighteen dismissals in thirteen matches. He was also the leading wicket-taker for East Zone in the 2018–19 Bangladesh Cricket League, with twenty dismissals in five matches. In August 2019, he was one of 35 cricketers named in a training camp ahead of Bangladesh's 2019–20 season. In November 2019, he was selected to play for the Rajshahi Royals in the 2019–20 Bangladesh Premier League.

== International career ==
In February 2018, he was named in Bangladesh's Twenty20 International (T20I) squad for their series against Sri Lanka. He made his T20I debut for Bangladesh against Sri Lanka on 18 February 2018. In June 2018, he was named in Bangladesh's Test squad for their series against the West Indies. He made his Test debut against the West Indies on 4 July 2018.

In August 2018, he was one of twelve debutants to be selected for a 31-man preliminary squad for Bangladesh ahead of the 2018 Asia Cup.

In April 2019, he was named in Bangladesh's squad for the 2019 Cricket World Cup. On 13 May 2019, he made his ODI debut for Bangladesh, against the West Indies, in the fifth match of the tri-series in Ireland. In Bangladesh's next match of the tri-series, and Abu Jayed's second ODI, he took his first five-wicket haul in ODIs, with five wickets for 58 runs against Ireland.

== Personal life ==
On 8 July 2020 Abu Jayed married Dr Touhida Akter Juha at his hometown Sylhet. Due to COVID-19 pandemic situation, they couldn't arrange a big ceremony.

== Teams Played ==
Bangladesh U19, Rangpur Riders, Bangladesh Cricket Board XI, Dhaka Dynamites, Bangladesh, Khulna Titans, Chittagong Vikings, Bangladesh A, Rajshahi Royals, Fortune Barishal.
