= Sunzamul Islam =

Bangladeshi cricketer (born 1990)

Personal information
- Born: 17 January 1990 (age 36); Rajshahi, Bangladesh
- Nickname: Nayan
- Height: 1.79 m (5 ft 10 in)
- Batting: Left-handed
- Bowling: Slow left arm orthodox
- Role: Bowler

International information
- National side: Bangladesh
- Only Test (cap 87): 31 January 2018 v Sri Lanka
- ODI debut (cap 124): 19 May 2017 v Ireland
- Last ODI: 23 January 2018 v Zimbabwe
- ODI shirt no.: 6

Domestic team information
- Years: Team
- 2009/10–2016/17: Rajshahi Division
- 2012/13–2015/16: North Zone
- 2014/15–2016: Prime Doleshwar Sporting Club
- 2016/17: Dhaka Dynamites
- 2017/18: Chittagong Vikings

Career statistics
Competition	Test	ODI	FC	LA
Matches	1	3	116	160
Runs scored	24	19	3,536	1,070
Batting average	24.00	19.00	23.41	15.97
100s/50s	0/0	0/0	2/12	0/1
Top score	24	19	172	53*
Balls bowled	270	150	23,486	7,536
Wickets	1	5	438	201
Bowling average	153.00	15.80	28.07	28.59
5 wickets in innings	0	0	26	3
10 wickets in match	0	0	7	0
Best bowling	1/153	2/22	9/80	5/30
Catches/stumpings	0/–	0/–	66/–	48/–
Medal record
Representing Bangladesh
Men's Cricket
South Asian Games
Gold medal – first place	2010 Dhaka	Team
- Source: ESPNcricinfo, 20 November 2025

Sunzamul Islam (Bengali: সানজামুল ইসলাম; born 17 January 1990), also known as Sanjamul Islam, is a Bangladeshi cricketer. He was born in Rajshahi

== Domestic career ==
In Round 2 of the 2016–17 Bangladesh Cricket League, playing for North Zone, he took 9 wickets for 80 runs in the second innings. He was named as man of the match. His figures are the third-best by a Bangladeshi bowler in a first-class match.

Along with Shuvagata Hom, he was the joint-leading wicket-taker in the 2016–17 Bangladesh Cricket League, with a total of 25 dismissals. In October 2018, he was named in the squad for the Chittagong Vikings team, following the draft for the 2018–19 Bangladesh Premier League. He was the leading wicket-taker for North Zone in the tournament, with 29 dismissals in six matches. In November 2019, he was selected to play for the Cumilla Warriors in the 2019–20 Bangladesh Premier League.

== International career ==
In March 2017, he was included in Bangladesh's One Day International (ODI) squad for their series against Sri Lanka, although he did not play. The following month, he was named in Bangladesh's Twenty20 International (T20I) squad for the matches against Sri Lanka, although again he did not play. Later the same month, he was named in Bangladesh's ODI squads for the 2017 Ireland Tri-Nation Series and the 2017 ICC Champions Trophy. He made his ODI debut for Bangladesh against Ireland on 19 May 2017. He picked up two wickets on debut while bowling at a healthy economy. Bangladesh went on to win the match by 8 wickets.

In January 2018, he was added to Bangladesh's Test squad for their series against Sri Lanka. He made his Test debut on 31 January 2018 against Sri Lanka.
