= Mahfuzur Rahman (umpire) =

Bangladeshi cricket umpire (born 1973)

Mahfuzur Rahman Litu
Personal information
- Full name: Mahfuzur Rahman
- Born: 3 September 1973 (age 53); Dhaka, Bangladesh

Umpiring information
- WODIs umpired: 6 (2012–2023)
- WT20Is umpired: 6 (2012–2023)
- Source: ESPNcricinfo, 5 January 2018

Mahfuzur Rahman Litu (Bengali: মাহফুজুর রহমান লিটু; born 3 September 1973) is a Bangladeshi cricket umpire.

== Umpiring career ==
Mahfuzur Rahman officiates First Class and List-A matches in Bangladesh. Since 2012 he stands as umpire in Bangladesh Premier League. Till 2017–18 Bangladesh Premier League he has officiated 34 matches in BPL. In 2017 BPL, Sylhet Sixers lodged a complain against him after a 7-ball over by Kamrul Islam due to his err in ball counting and the team eventually lost the game. In the same tournament Sabbir Rahman was penalised after using abusing Mahfuzur Rahman for adjusting him LBW.
