= Morshed Ali Khan =

Bangladeshi cricketer (born 1972)

Personal information
- Full name: Mohammad Morshed Ali Khan Sumon
- Born: 14 May 1972 (age 54); Faridpur, Dhaka, Bangladesh
- Batting: Left-handed
- Bowling: Left-arm medium

International information
- National side: Bangladesh
- ODI debut (cap 43): 14 May 1998 v India
- Last ODI: 23 May 1998 v Kenya

Umpiring information
- T20Is umpired: 25 (2024–2025)
- WODIs umpired: 2 (2023)
- WT20Is umpired: 3 (2024)
- Source: Cricinfo, 13 February 2006

Mohammad Morshed Ali Khan Sumon (Bengali: মোহাম্মদ মোরশেদ আলী খান সুমন; born 14 May 1972) is a Bangladeshi cricket umpire and former cricketer who played three One Day Internationals in 1998. He was included in the Bangladesh national cricket team squad in the 1998 Commonwealth Games.

The tall left-arm bowler played in the tri-nation tournament in India in 1998. In the first match against India, he took 1/31 from ten overs. At present he is a professional umpire appointed in BCB's panel of first-class umpires.

== See also ==
- List of Twenty20 International cricket umpires
