= Marshall Ayub =

Bangladesh cricketer (born 1988)

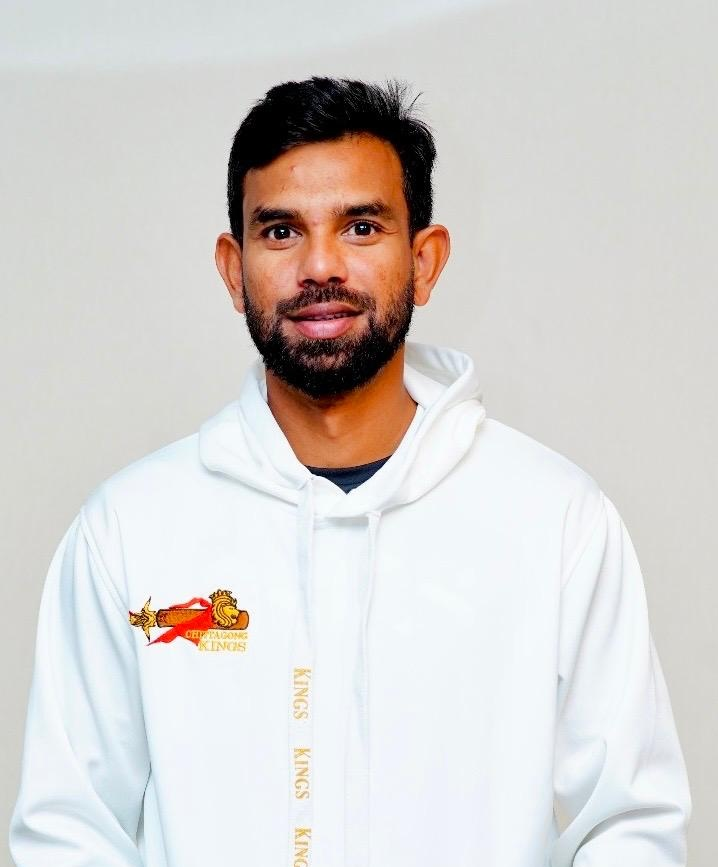

Personal information
- Full name: Marshall Ayub
- Born: 5 December 1988 (age 37); Dhaka, Bangladesh
- Batting: Right-handed
- Bowling: Right-arm leg break
- Role: All-rounder

International information
- National side: Bangladesh
- Test debut (cap 69): 9 October 2013 v New Zealand
- Last Test: 27 January 2014 v Sri Lanka

Domestic team information
- Years: Team
- 2005–2006: Barisal Division
- 2006–2011: Dhaka Division
- 2010: Cyclones of Chittagong
- 2011–present: Dhaka Metropolis
- 2012: Khulna Royal Bengals
- 2013–present: Chittagong Kings

Career statistics
Competition	Test	FC	LA	T20
Matches	3	176	183	48
Runs scored	125	10,320	5,326	626
Batting average	20.83	38.36	34.58	17.38
100s/50s	0/0	29/44	4/38	0/2
Top score	41	289	135	53
Balls bowled	60	2,830	714	34
Wickets	0	44	22	5
Bowling average	–	39.75	27.13	6.60
5 wickets in innings	–	1	0	0
10 wickets in match	–	0	0	0
Best bowling	–	6/90	2/27	4/20
Catches/stumpings	2/-	121/-	70/-	17/-
- Source: ESPNcricinfo, 9 December 2025

Marshall Ayub (born 5 December 1988) is a Bangladeshi cricketer who represents Dhaka Metropolis and the Chittagong Kings. An all-rounder, he bowls right-arm leg spin, and bats right-handed. He began his career representing Barisal Division in 2005–06 before switching to Dhaka Division for the 2006–07 season and Dhaka Metropolis in 2011. Ayub has also represented the Bangladesh A side and played for Cyclones of Chittagong, Khulna Royal Bengals and Chittagong Kings in the now defunct Bangladesh National Cricket League and the Bangladesh Premier League respectively.

Ayub was born in Dhaka, Bangladesh. In December 2005, he made his debut for Barisal Division in a List A match against Khulna, and subsequently made his first-class debut against the same side. In January 2013, Ayub received modest media coverage as he and Mehrab Hossain, Jr. recorded the highest partnership in Bangladesh's first-class cricket and the second highest in all-time fifth-wicket stands, Ayub top scoring with 289 in a partnership worth 494 runs.

As a result of his consistent performance in first-class cricket, Marshall got a call in the test squad for Bangladesh during the tour of Sri Lanka in 2013. However, he could not make it to the first eleven during that tour where Bangladesh lost two-Test series 1–0.

In October 2018, he was named in the squad for the Rajshahi Kings team, following the draft for the 2018–19 Bangladesh Premier League.
