= North Zone cricket team (Bangladesh) =

The North Zone cricket team is a first-class cricket team that represents northern Bangladesh in the Bangladesh Cricket League (BCL). It is a composite team of two Bangladeshi first-class teams: Rajshahi Division and Rangpur Division. North Zone has played in the BCL from the opening 2012–13 season. It won the competition in 2016-17. It is owned by the Bangladesh Cricket Board (BCB).

== Current Squad ==
Players with international caps are listed in bold

Name	Batting style	Bowling style	Notes
Batsmen
**Towhid Hridoy**	Right-hand bat		
**Tanzid Hasan**	Left-hand bat		
Aich Mollah	Right-hand bat		
**Mahmudul Hasan Joy**	Right-hand bat	Right-arm off break	
**Sabbir Rahman**	Right-hand bat	Right-arm leg break	
All-Rounders
Abdullah Al Mamun	Left-hand bat	Right-arm fast-medium	
Sabbir Hossain	Right-hand bat	Right-arm medium-fast	
Wicketkeepers
Akbar Ali (c)	Right-hand bat		
Pritom Kumar	Right-hand bat		
Spin Bowlers
**Enamul Haque jr**	Left-hand bat	Slow left-arm orthodox	
Nahidul Islam	Right-hand bat	Right-arm off break	
Hasan Murad	Left-hand bat	Slow left-arm orthodox	
**Sunzamul Islam**	Left-hand bat	Slow left-arm orthodox	
**Aminul Islam**	Right-hand bat	Right-arm leg break	
**Rishad Hossain**	Right-hand bat	Right-arm leg break	
Pace Bowlers
Mushfiq Hasan	Right-hand bat	Right-arm medium	
**Nahid Rana**	Right-hand bat	Right-arm fast-medium	
Yeasin Arafat	Right-hand bat	Right-arm medium	
Asadulah Galib	Right-hand bat	Right-arm medium	
Enamul Hoque Ashiq	Right-hand bat	Right-arm medium	
