= Central Zone cricket team (Bangladesh) =

Bangladeshi cricket team

Central Zone Cricket Team
- League: Bangladesh Cricket League; BCL 1-Day

Personnel
- Captain: Saif Hassan
- Owner: BCB

Team information
- City: Dhaka Metropolis; Dhaka Division
First-class kit

The Central Zone cricket team or Walton Central Zone is a first-class cricket team that represents central Bangladesh – the Dhaka Division – in the Bangladesh Cricket League (BCL). It is a composite team of two Bangladeshi first-class teams from central Bangladesh: Dhaka Division and Dhaka Metropolis. Central Zone has won the BCL thrice, in the opening 2012–13 season, in the 2015–16 season and in the 9th edition of BCL played during the 2021–22, where they defeated BCB South Zone in the finals under the captaincy of Shuvagata Hom.

== Current squad ==
Players with international caps are listed in bold

Name	Batting style	Bowling style	Notes
Batsmen
**Saif Hassan** **(c)**	Right-hand bat	Slow right-arm orthodox	
**Mohammad Naim**	Left-hand bat		
**Rony Talukdar**	Right hand bat		
**Naeem Islam**	Right-hand bat	Slow right-arm orthodox	
Abdul Mazid	Right-hand bat		
Taibur Rahman	Left-hand bat	Slow left-arm orthodox	
Wicketkeepers
**Mahidul Islam Ankon**	Right-hand bat		
Spin Bowlers
**Nazmul Islam Apu**	Left-hand bat	Slow left-arm orthodox	
**Shuvagoto Hom**	Right-hand bat	Right-arm off break	
Md Anamul Haque	Right-hand bat	Right-arm off break	
Arif Ahmed	Left-hand bat	Slow left-arm orthodox	
Pace Bowlers
Ripon Mondol	Right-hand bat	Right-arm fast-medium	
**Shohidul Islam**	Right-hand bat	Right-arm medium-fast	
**Abu Haider Rony**	Right-hand bat	Right-arm medium-fast	
