= South Zone cricket team (Bangladesh) =

The South Zone cricket team or Prime Bank South Zone is a first-class cricket team that represents south-western Bangladesh in the annual Bangladesh Cricket League (BCL) tournament . It is a composite team of two Bangladeshi first-class teams: Barisal Division and Khulna Division. South Zone has played in the BCL since the inaugural 2012–13 season and has won the BCL four times, the most by any team.

== Current squad ==
Players with international caps are listed in bold

Name	Batting style	Bowling style	Notes
Batsmen
**Salman Hossain**	Right-hand bat	Right-arm medium fast	
Iftakhar Hossain Ifti	Left-hand bat	Right-arm medium fast	
**Fazle Mahmud**	Left-hand bat	Slow left-arm orthodox	
Kalam Siddique	Right-hand bat		
Wicketkeepers
**Anamul Haque**	Right-hand bat		
**Mohammad Mithun (c)**	Right-hand bat		
Moin Khan	Right-hand bat		
Spin Bowlers
Samiun Basir Ratul	Left-hand bat	Slow left-arm orthodox	
Wasi Siddique	Right-hand bat	Right-arm leg break	
Md Ashraful Hasan	Right-hand bat	Right-arm off break	
Pace Bowlers
Ruyel Miah	Left-hand bat	Left-arm fast-medium	
**Abu Jayed**	Right-hand bat	Right-arm medium-fast	
Rizan Hossain	Right-hand bat	Right-arm medium-fast	
Abdul Halim	Right-hand bat	Right-arm fast	
Sofor Ali	Left-hand bat	Right-arm medium	
