= 2023–24 Dhaka Premier Division Cricket League =

Cricket tournament

- Dates: 11 March 2024 – 6 May 2024
- Administrator: Bangladesh Cricket Board
- Cricket format: List A
- Tournament format: Round-robin
- Champions: Abahani Limited (3rd title)
- Participants: 12
- Matches: 84
- Player of the series: Saif Hassan (Sheikh Jamal Dhanmondi Club)
- Most runs: Mahidul Islam Ankon (647) (Mohammedan)
- Most wickets: Abu Hider (31) (Mohammedan)

The 2023–24 Dhaka Premier Division Cricket League (DPDCL) is the tenth edition of the Dhaka Premier Division Cricket League, a List A cricket competition in Bangladesh. It is being contested by 12 club teams. The tournament started on 11 March 2024. Player signings took place on 28 and 29 February 2024. CCDM has increased the individual prize money in this edition, with the Player of the Tournament, Highest Run-Scorer and Highest Wicket-Taker receiving ৳2.5 lakh each from ৳2 lakh last season. They also decided to pay ৳10,000 to ৳15,000 as Player of the Match award.

Abahani Limited were the defending champions. Gazi Tyres Cricket Academy and Partex Sporting Club were promoted to this season from 2022–23 Dhaka First Division Cricket League, replacing Agrani Bank cricket team and Dhaka Leopards, who were relegated after the previous tournament.

Abahani won the tournament with two rounds still to go, as they were undefeated and three wins clear of the second team.

== Squads ==
Abahani Limited	Brothers Union	City Club	Gazi Group	Gazi Tyres CA	Legends of Rupganj
Naim Sheikh; Sabbir Hossain; Mahmudul Hasan Joy; Afif Hossain; Jaker Ali; Mosaddek Hossain (c); Saifuddin; Nahidul Islam; Rakibul Hasan; Tanvir Islam; Khaled Ahmed	Imtiaz Hossain; Abdul Mazid; Rahmatullah Ali; Mahmudul Hasan; Rahatul Ferdous; Asif Ahmed RATUL; Zakirul AHMED GEM; Shakil Hossain; Monir Hossain (c); Abu Jayed Rahi; Salauddin Shakil	Sadikur Rahman; Hasan; Shahriar Komol; Moinul Islam; Rafsan Al Mahmud; Ashik UI Alam Naem; Sazzadul Hoque Ripon (c); Moinul Islam Sohall; Ifran Hossain; Sanjit Saha; Mehedi Hasan	Habibur Rahman; Pinak Ghosh; Mehedi Maruf (c); Anisul Islam; Md Al Amin Jr; Pritom Kumar; Moin Khan; Abdul Gaffar Saqlain; Sheikh Parviz Jibon; Ruyel Miah; Akm Husna Habib Mehedi	Ashikur Rahman Shibli; Iftakhar Hossain Ifti; Ashik Zaman; Md.Jubarul Islam Ratul; Tahjibul Islam (c); Saeed Sarker; Shamim Mia; Iftekhar Sajjad; MD Aridul Islam Akash; Taufiq Ahmed; Maruf Mridha	Mashrafe Mortaza; Shamim Hossain; Shahidul Islam; Aminul Islam; Nihaduzzaman; Aliss Islam; Imran Uzzaman; Shadman Islam; Alauddin Ahmed; Mehdi Hasan; Shuvagata Hom; Sumon Khan; Mominul Haque; Md. Rizwan; Taufiq Khan
Mohammedan	Partex SC	Prime Bank	Rupganj Tigers	Sheikh Jamal DC	Shinepukur CC
Rony Talukdar; Imrul Kayes (c); Mahidul Islam Ankon; Mahmudullah; Ariful Haque (Sr.); Ariful Islam (Jr.); Mehidy Hassan Miraz; Abu Hider Rony; Asif Hasan; Musfik Hasan; Nayeem Hasan; Nasum Ahmed; Shahidul Islam; Mostakim Hossain; Rubel Mia; Nabil	Mizanur Rahman (c); Asaduzzaman Payel; Azmir Ahmed; Rajibul Islam; Mohor Sheikh; Muktar Ali; Munim Shahriar; Myshukur Rahman; Rakibul Atik; Tanbir Hayder; Zahiduzzaman Khan; Susanto Debnath	Tamim Iqbal (c); Mushfiqur Rahim; Mustafizur Rahman; Shahadat Hossain; Parvez Hossain Emon; Mohammad Mithun; Soumya Sarkar; Sabbir Rahman; Zakir Hasan; Bishal Chowdhury; Hasan Mahmud; Rubel Hossain; Rezaur Rahman; Mahedi Hasan; Ashiquzzaman; Enamul Haque; Nazmul Islam; Sanjamul Islam; Alok Kapali; Taijul Islam; Nayeem Islam; Tariqul Islam	Abdulla Al Mamun; Mahfijul Islam; Farhad Hossain (c); Shamsur Rahman Shuvo; Asadulla Al Galib; Salman Hossain Emon; Sohag Gazi; Arafat Sunny Jr; Qazi Onik Islam; Nabil Samad; Rohan Ud Dowla Borshon	Shakib Al Hasan; Arif Ahmed; Taibur Rahman; Ziaur Rahman; Nurul Hasan Sohan (c); Fazle Mahmud; Robiul Islam; Shafiqul Islam; Shykat Ali; Mrittunjoy Chowdhury; Saif Hassan; Tipu Sultan; Yasir Ali Chowdhury; Yasir Arafat Mishu; Ripon Mondol	Akbar Ali (c); Amite Hasan; Arafat Sunny; Hasan Murad; Irfan Shukkur; Mukidul Islam; Jawad Royen; Jishan Alam; Khalid Hasan; Marshall Ayub; Robiul Hoque; SM Meherob; Nahid Rana

== Venues ==
Mirpur Dhaka	Fatullah Narayanganj	Savar Dhaka	Savar Dhaka
Sher-e-Bangla National Cricket Stadium	Khan Shaheb Osman Ali Stadium	BKSP 3 No. Ground	BKSP 4 No. Ground
Capacity: 26,000	Capacity: 18,600	Capacity:	Capacity:
Matches:11	Matches:25	Matches:30	Matches:18

== Teams and format ==
The competition is being played in round-robin format, followed by play-offs among the top six teams for the championship and among the lowest three teams to determine relegation. The competing teams are as follows:

- Abahani Limited
- Brothers Union
- City Club
- Gazi Group Cricketers
- Gazi Tyres Cricket Academy
- Legends of Rupganj
- Mohammedan Sporting Club
- Partex Sporting Club
- Prime Bank Cricket Club
- Rupganj Tigers Cricket Club
- Sheikh Jamal Dhanmondi Club
- Shinepukur Cricket Club

== Points table ==
=== League Points Table ===
Pos	Team	Pld	W	L	T	NR	Pts	NRR	Qualification
1	Abahani Limited	11	11	0	0	0	22	2.832	Advance to Super League
2	Shinepukur Cricket Club	11	8	3	0	0	16	0.959	Advance to Super League
3	Mohammedan Sporting Club	11	8	3	0	0	16	0.877	Advance to Super League
4	Sheikh Jamal Dhanmondi Club	11	8	3	0	0	16	0.542	Advance to Super League
5	Prime Bank Cricket Club	11	7	4	0	0	14	0.643	Advance to Super League
6	Gazi Group Cricketers	11	7	4	0	0	14	0.473	Advance to Super League
7	Legends of Rupganj	11	6	5	0	0	12	0.116	
8	Brothers Union	11	3	8	0	0	6	−1.627	
9	Partex Sporting Club	11	2	9	0	0	4	−0.968	
10	City Club	11	2	9	0	0	4	−0.896	Advance to Relegation League
11	Rupganj Tigers Cricket Club	11	2	9	0	0	4	−1.064	Advance to Relegation League
12	Gazi Tyres Cricket Academy	11	2	9	0	0	4	−1.733	Advance to Relegation League

Source: espncricinfo

Teams qualified for the Super League phase of the tournament.

Teams qualified for the Relegation League play-offs phase of the tournament.

***when two teams are tied on points, head-to-head winner is placed above on the table

=== Super League ===
Pos	Team	Pld	W	L	T	NR	Pts	NRR
1	Abahani Limited (C)	16	16	0	0	0	32	2.271
2	Mohammedan Sporting Club	16	12	4	0	0	24	0.724
3	Prime Bank Cricket Club	16	10	6	0	0	20	0.855
4	Shinepukur Cricket Club	16	9	7	0	0	18	0.447
5	Sheikh Jamal Dhanmondi Club	16	9	7	0	0	18	0.085
6	Gazi Group Cricketers	16	8	8	0	0	16	−0.129

Updated to match(es) played on 6 May 2024. Source: espncricinfo

Champion.

**Teams carrying result forward from the league stage.
***when two teams are tied on points, head-to-head winner is placed above on the table

=== Relegation League ===
Pos	Team	Pld	W	L	T	NR	Pts	NRR	
1	Rupganj Tigers Cricket Club	2	2	0	0	0	4	1.753	
2	Gazi Tyres Cricket Academy (R)	2	1	1	0	0	2	−0.236	Relegated to 2024–25 DFDCL
3	City Club (R)	2	0	2	0	0	0	−1.280	Relegated to 2024–25 DFDCL

Updated to match(es) played on 29 April 2024. Source: espncricinfo

**Teams carrying result forward from the league stage.
***when two teams are tied on points, head-to-head winner is placed above on the table

== Match Summary ==
Below is a summary of results for each team's nine regular season matches in chronological order. A team's opponent for any given match is listed above the margin of victory/defeat.

Team	League Stage											Super League					
Team	1	2	3	4	5	6	7	8	9	10	11	1	2	3	4	5	Pos
Abahani Limited (ABL)	PSC; 171 runs	GTCA; 146 runs	SCC; 7 wickets	BU; 8 wickets	CC; 52 runs	RTCC; 140 runs	GGC; 7 wickets	MSC; 8 wickets	LOR; 8 wickets	PBCC; 58 runs	SJDC; 10 wickets	PBCC; 5 wickets	GGC; 171 runs	SJDC; 4 wickets	MSC; 9 runs	SCC; 4 wickets	1st place, gold medalist(s)
Brothers Union (BU)	LOR; 6 wickets	PBCC; 165 runs	SJDC; 121 runs	ABL; 8 wickets	GTCA; 2 wickets	SCC; 26 runs	PSC; 4 wickets	CC; 20 runs	RTCC; 31 runs	GGC; 130 runs	MSC; 5 wickets	×					8th
Gazi Group Cricketers (GGC)	RTC; 3 wickets	PSC; 5 wickets	MSC; 3 runa	LOR; 6 wickets	PBCC; 6 wickets	SJDC; 39 runs	ABL; 7 wickets	GTCA; 9 wickets	SCC; 80 runs	BU; 130 runs	CC; 8 wickets	SCC; 13 runs	ABL; 171	PBCC; 7 wickets	SJDC; 2 wickets	MSC; 53 runs	6th
Legends of Rupganj (LOR)	BU; 6 wickets	CC; 5 wickets	RTC; 1 wickets	GCC; 6 wickets	MSC; 6 wickets	PSC; 7 wickets	PBCC; 5 wickets	SJDC; 60 runs	ABL; 8 wickets	GTCA; 10 wickets	SCC; 67 runs	×					7th
Mohammedan SC (MSC)	CC; 43 runs	RTC; 84 runs	GCC; 3 runs	PSC; 4 wickets	LOR; 6 wickets	PBCC; 1 wickets	SJDC; 5 runs	ABL; 8 wickets	GTCA; 9 wickets	SCC; 6 wickets	BU; 5 wickets	SJDC; 5 wickets	PBCC; 33 runs	SCC; 8 runs	ABL; 9 runs	GCC; 53 runs	2nd place, silver medalist(s)
Partex Sporting Club (PSC)	ABL; 171 runs	GCC; 5 wickets	GTCA; 52 runs	MSC; 4 wickets	SCC; 128 runs	LOR; 7 wickets	BU; 4 wickets	PBCC; 4 wickets	CC; 2 wickets	SJDC; 5 wickets	RTCC; 3 wickets	×					9th
Prime Bank Cricket Club (PBCC)	SCC; 71 runs	BU; 165 runs	CC; 3 runs	RTCC; 8 wickets	GCC; 6 wickets	MSC; 1 wickets	LOR; 5 wickets	PSC; 4 wickets	SJDC; 73 runs	ABL; 58 runs	GTCA; 141 runs	ABL; 5 wickets	MSC; 33 runs	GGC; 7 wickets	SCC; 111 runs	SJDC; 199 runs	3rd
Sheikh Jamal Dhanmondi Club (SJDC)	GTCA; 6 wickets	SCC; 6 wickets	BU; 121 runs	CC; 40 runs	RTCC ?	GCC; 39 runs	MSC; 5 runs	LOR; 60 runs	PBCC; 73 run	PSC; 5 wickets	ABL; 10 wickets	MSC; 5 wickets	SCC; 7 wickets	ABL; 4 wickets	GGC; 2 wickets	PBSC; 199 runs	5th
Shinepukur Cricket Club (SCC)	PBCC; 71 runs	SJDC; 6 wickets	ABL; 7 wickets	GTCA; 73 runs	PSC; 128 runs	BU; 26 runs	CC; 92 runs	RTCC; 10 wickets	GGC; 80 runs	MSC; 6 wickets	LOR; 67 runs	GGC; 13 run	SJDC; 7 wickets	MSC; 8 runs	PBCC; 111 runs	ABL; 4 wickets	4th
												Relegation League					
City Club (CC)	MSC; 43 runs	LOR; 5 wickets	PBCC; 3 runs	SJDC; 40 runs	ABL; 52 runs	GTCA; 38 runs	SCC; 92 runs	BU; 20 runs	PSC; 2 wickets	RTCC; 5 runs	GGC; 8 wickets	GTCA; 41 runs	RTCC; 87 runs	×			12th
Gazi Tyres CA (GTCA)	SJDC; 6 wickets	ABL; 146 runs	PSC; 52 runs	SCC; 73 runs	BU; 2 wickets	CC; 38 runs	RTCC; 71 runs	GGC; 9 wickets	MSC; 9 wickets	LOR; 10 wickets	PBCC; 141 runs	CC; 41 runs	RTCC; 7 wickets	×			11th
Rupganj Tigers (RTC)	GCC; 3 wickets	MSC; 84 runs	LOR; 1 wickets	PBCC; 8 wickets	SJDC; 6 wickets	ABL; 140 runs	GTCA; 71 runa	SCC; 10 wickets	BU; 31 runs	CC; 5 runs	PSC; 3 wickets	CC; 87 runs	GTCA; 7 wickets	×			10th

Team's results→	Won	Tied	Lost	N/R

== League Stage ==
=== Round 1 ===
Match 1
11 March 2024
9:00 am
Scorecard

Abahani Limited; 268/9 (50 overs)	v	Partex Sporting Club; 97 (32.4 overs)
Sabbir Hossain 71 (59); Asaduzzaman Payel 3/33 (7.1 overs)		Rajibul Islam 20 (30); Tanvir Islam 4/26 (10)

Abahani Limited won by 171 runs.
Sher-e-Bangla National Cricket Stadium, Dhaka
Umpires: Tanvir Ahmed and Morshed Ali Khan
Player of the match: Tanvir Islam (Abahani Limited)

- Partex Sporting Club won the toss and elected to field first.

Match 2
11 March 2024
9:00 am
Scorecard

Gazi Tyres Cricket Academy; 167 (47.5 overs)	v	Sheikh Jamal Dhanmondi Club; 168/4 (31.4 overs)
Ashiqur Rahman 89* (133); Tipu Sultan 4/30 (10 overs)		Saif Hassan 45 (63); Maruf Mridha 3/47 (8 overs)

Sheikh Jamal Dhanmondi Club won by 4 wickets.
BKSP 3 No. Ground, Savar
Umpires: Syed Mozahiduzzaman Swapan and Ishtiaq Ahmed Nadim
Player of the match: Tipu Sultan (Sheikh Jamal Dhanmondi Club)

- Sheikh Jamal Dhanmondi Club won the toss and elected to field first.

Match 3
11 March 2024
9:00 am
Scorecard

Prime Bank Cricket Club; 196 (47 overs)	v	Shinepukur Cricket Club; 125 (41.5 overs)
Nazmul Islam 40 (53); Mukidul Islam 4/42 (10 overs)		Arafat Sunny 28 (56); Hasan Mahmud 4/15 (10 overs)

Prime Bank Cricket Club won by 71 runs.
Khan Shaheb Osman Ali Stadium, Fatullah
Umpires: Gazi Sohel and Shyful Islam Jeewel
Player of the match: Nazmul Islam (Prime Bank Cricket Club)

- Shinepukur Cricket Club won the toss and elected to field first.

Match 4
12 March 2024
9:00 am
Scorecard

Legends of Rupganj; 202 (47.2 overs)	v	Brothers Union; 204/4 (36 overs)
Mahmudul Hasan 42 (64); Shahidul Islam 3/35 (10 overs)		Shadman Islam 67 (88); Rahatul Ferdous 3/40 (10)

Legends of Rupganj won by 6 wickets
Sher-e-Bangla National Cricket Stadium, Dhaka
Umpires: Mahfuzur Rahman and Barkhatullah Turkey
Player of the match: Al-Amin Hossain (Legends of Rupganj)

- Brothers Union won the toss and elected to bat first.

Match 5
12 March 2024
9:00 am
Scorecard

Mohammedan Sporting Club; 240 (49.3 overs)	v	City Club; 197 (46.2 overs)
Rony Talukder 71 (108); Mehedi Hasan 4/35 (9.3 overs)		Rafsan Al Mahmud 56 (90); Mushfiq Hasan 4/43 (8.2 overs)

Mohammedan Sporting Club won by 43 runs
BKSP 4 No. Ground, Savar
Umpires: Ali Arman and Sajedul Islam
Player of the match: Mushfiq Hasan (Mohammedan)

- City Club won the toss and elected to field first.

Match 6
12 March 2024
9:00 am
Scorecard

Rupganj Tigers Cricket Club; 258/7 (50 overs)	v	Gazi Group Cricketers; 260/7 (48.5 overs)
Abdullah Al Mamun 61 (95); Moin Khan 2/33 (10 overs)		Al-Amin 59 (66); Nabil Samad 3/46 (10 overs)

Gazi Group Cricketers won by 7 wickets
BKSP 3 No. Ground, Savar
Umpires: Imran Parvez and Sohrab Hossain
Player of the match: Moin Khan (Gazi Group Cricketers)

- Gazi Group Cricketers won the toss and elected to field first

=== Round 2 ===
Match 7
14 March 2024
9:00 am
Scorecard

Abahani Limited; 343/7 (50 overs)	v	Gazi Tyres Cricket Academy; 163/9 (40 overs)
Sabbir Hossain 98 (80); Iftekhar Hossain 2/39 (10 overs)		Tahjibul Islam 58* (77); Mosaddek Hossain 3/19 (8 overs)

Abahani Limited won by 143 runs (DLS Method)
Khan Shaheb Osman Ali Stadium, Fatullah
Umpires: Barkatulylah Turkey and Imran Parvez
Player of the match: Sabbir Hossain (Abahani Limited)

- Gazi Tyres Cricket Academy won the toss and elected field first

Match 8
12 March 2024
9:00 am
Scorecard

Sheikh Jamal Dhanmondi Club; 237/7 (47 overs)	v	Shinepukur Cricket Club; 238/4 (45.4 overs)
Nurul Hasan 80 (70); Jawad Mohammad 3/37 (9 overs)		Khalid Hasan 66 (94); Arif Ahmed 1/41 (9 overs)

Shinepukur Cricket Club won by 6 wickets
BKSP 3 No. Ground, Savar
Umpires: Manjurul Islam and Morshed Ali Khan
Player of the match: Akbar Ali (Shinepukur Cricket Club)

- Shinepukur Cricket Club won the toss and elected to field first

Match 9
14 March 2024
9:00 am
Scorecard

Prime Bank Cricket Club; 380/4 (49 overs)	v	Brothers Union; 215/9 (49 overs)
Parvez Hossain Emon 151 (129); Abu Jayed Rahi 3/70 (10 overs)		Abdul Majid 56 (76); Nazmul Islam 3/34 (10 overs)

Prime Bank Cricket Club won by 165 runs
BKSP 4 No. Ground, Savar
Umpires: Gazi Sohel and Sajedul Islam
Player of the match: Parvez Hossain Emon (Prime Bank Cricket Club)

- Brothers Union won the toss and elected to field first.

Match 10
15 March 2024
9:00 am
Scorecard

City Club; 187 (46.2 overs)	v	Legends of Rupganj; 188/5 (37.1 overs)
Sadikur Rahman 96 (110); Alauddin Babu 4/32 (10 overs)		Shadman Islam 91* (109); Ashik-Ul-Alam 1/6 (2 overs)

Legends of Rupganj won by 5 wickets
BKSP 3 No. Ground, Savar
Umpires: Asadur Rahman and Mahfuzur Rahman
Player of the match: Shadman Islam (Legends of Rupganj)

- Legends of Rupganj won the toss and elected to field first.

Match 11
15 March 2024
9:00 am
Scorecard

Mohammedan Sporting Club; 266/5 (50 Overs)	v	Rupganj Tigers Cricket Club; 182/9 (50 Overs)
Ariful Islam 115* (106); Abdullah Al Mamun 2/71 (9.4 overs)		Mahfijul Islam 78 (113); Abu Hider 4/30 (10 overs)

Mohammedan Sporting Club won by 84 runs
Khan Shaheb Osman Ali Stadium, Fatullah
Umpires: Joynal Abedin and Mozahiduzzaman
Player of the match: Ariful Islam (Mohammedan Sporting Club)

- Rupganj Tigers Cricket Club won the toss and elected to field first.

Match 12
15 March 2024
9:00 am
Scorecard

Partex Sporting Club; 130/10 (38.5 Overs)	v	Gazi Group Cricketers; 133/5 (32.1 Overs)
Azmir Ahmed 32 (42); Mahfuzur Rahman Rabby 4/25 (9.5 overs)		Mehedi Maruf 59* (94); Tufayel Ahmed 3/39 (8 overs)

Gazi Group Cricketer won by 5 wickets
BKSP 4 No. Ground, Savar
Umpires: Ali Arman and Shafiuddin Ahmed
Player of the match: Mahfuzur Rahman Rabby (Gazi Group Cricketers)

- Gazi Group Cricketers won the toss and elected to field first.

=== Round 3 ===
Match 13
17 March 2024
9:00 am
Scorecard

Shinepukur Cricket Club; 169 (42.4 Overs)	v	Abahani Limited; 172/3 (34.1 Overs)
Akbar Ali 55 (44); Khaled Ahmed 3/17 (6 overs)		Mohammad Naim 66 (87); Arafat Sunny 2/22 (7.1 overs)

Abahani Limited won by 7 wickets
BKSP 3 No. Ground, Savar
Umpires: Gazi Sohel and Sajedul Islam
Player of the match: Afif Hossain (Abahani Limited)

- Shinepukur Cricket Club won the toss and elected to bat first.

Match 14
17 March 2024
9:00 am
Scorecard

Sheikh Jamal Dhanmondi Club; 256 (50 Overs)	v	Brothers Union; 135 (40.2 Overs)
Nurul Hasan 101 (97); Abu Jayed 3/43 (10 overs)		Rahatul Ferdous 53 (76); Shafiqul Islam 4/12 (9.2 overs)

Sheikh Jamal Dhanmondi Club won by 121 runs
Khan Shaheb Osman Ali Stadium, Fatullah
Umpires: Mahfuzur Rahman and Reazul Islam
Player of the match: Nurul Hasan (Sheikh Jamal Dhanmondi Club)

- Brothers Union won the toss and elected to field first

Match 15
17 March 2024
9:00 am
Scorecard

Prime Bank Cricket Club; 305/8 (50 Overs)	v	City Club; 302/7 (50 Overs)
Parvez Hossain Emon 100 (114); Mehedi Hasan 4/68 (10 overs)		Sajjadul Haque 76 (37); Mahedi Hasan 4/86 (10 overs)

Prime Bank Cricket Club won by 3 runs
BKSP 4 No. Ground, Savar
Umpires: Morshed Ali Khan and Shafiuddin Ahmed
Player of the match: Mahedi Hasan (Prime Bank Cricket Club)

- City Club won the toss and elected to field first

Match 16
18 March 2024
9:00 am
Scorecard

Rupganj Tigers Cricket Club; 209/8 (50 Overs)	v	Legends of Rupganj; 210/9 (49.4 Overs)
Farhad Hossain 74 (118); Abdul Halim 4/40 (10 overs)		Tawfique Khan 62 (71); Sohag Gazi 2/25 (10 overs)

Legends of Rupganj won by 1 wickets
BKSP 4 No. Ground, Savar
Umpires: Ali Arman and Ishtiaq Ahmed
Player of the match: Aminul Islam (Legends of Rupganj)

- Legends of Rupganj won the toss and elected to field first

Match 17
18 March 2024
9:00 am
Scorecard

Gazi Group Cricketers; 191 (47.4 Overs)	v	Mohammedan Sporting Club; 188/9 (50 Overs)
Anisul Islam Emon 71 (91); Nayeem Hasan 3/28 (6.4 overs)		Mahidul Islam Ankon 94 (123); Ruyel Miah 5/32 (10 overs)

Gazi Group Cricketers won by 3 runs
Khan Shaheb Osman Ali Stadium, Fatullah
Umpires: Imran Parvez and Mozahiduzzaman
Player of the match: Ruyel Miah (Gazi Group Cricketers)

- Mohammedan Sporting Club won the toss and elected to field first

Match 18
18 March 2024
9:00 am
Scorecard

Partex Sporting Club; 197/9 (50 Overs)	v	Gazi Tyres Cricket Academy; 145 (45.3 Overs)
Tanbir Hayder 49* (69); Maruf Mridha 3/43 (8 overs)		Asraful Alom Asif 37 (75); Rakibul Atik 3/15 (10)

Partex Sporting Club won by 52 runs
BKSP 3 No. Ground, Savar
Umpires: Asadur Rahman and Sohrab Hossain
Player of the match: Rakibul Atik (Partex Sporting Club)

- Gazi Tyres Cricket Academy won the toss and elected to field first

=== Round 4 ===
Match 19
20 March 2024
9:00 am
Scorecard

Brothers Union; 71 (21.3 Overs)	v	Abahani Limited; 72/2 (12.3 Overs)
Rahmat Ali 35 (29); Tanvir Islam 5/7 (6 overs)		Mohammad Naim 30 (32); Nur Mohammad 2/12 (6 overs)

Abahani Limited won by 8 wickets
Khan Shaheb Osman Ali Stadium, Fatullah
Umpires: Habibur Rahman and Shyful Islam
Player of the match: Tanvir Islam (Abahani Limited)

- Abahani Limited won the toss and elected to field first

Match 20
20 March 2024
9:00 am
Scorecard

Sheikh Jamal Dhanmondi Club; 218/5 (34 Overs)	v	City Club; 178/9 (34 Overs)
Yasir Ali Rabbi 78 (57); Rafsan Al Mahamud 1/10 (5 overs)		Shahriar Komol 38 (44); Shakib Al Hasan 3/39 (7 overs)

Sheikh Jamal Dhanmondi Club won by 40 runs
BKSP 4 No. Ground, Savar
Umpires: Asadur Rahman and Sohrab Hossain
Player of the match: Yasir Ali Rabbi (Sheikh Jamal Dhanmondi Club)

- City Club won the toss and elected to field first

Match 21
20 March 2024
9:00 am
Scorecard

Rupganj Tigers Cricket Club; 132 (31.1 Overs)	v	Prime Bank Cricket Club; 133/2 (29.2 Overs)
Shamsur Rahman 50 (46); Nazmul Islam Apu 3/24 (6 overs)		Tamim Iqbal 67 (78); Ariful Islam 1/27 (7 overs)

Prime Bank Cricket Club won by 8 wickets
BKSP 3 No. Ground, Savar
Umpires: Mahfuzur Rahman and Muhammad Kamruzzaman
Player of the match: Tamim Iqbal (Prime Bank Cricket Club)

- Prime Bank Cricket Club won the toss and elected to field first

Match 22
21 March 2024
9:00 am
Scorecard

Gazi Group Cricketers; 136 (35.4 Overs)	v	Legends of Rupganj; 137/4 (28 Overs)
Anisul Islam Emon 41 (36); Mashrafe Mortaza 5/19 (8 overs)		Chowdhur Md Rizwan 47* (44); Sheikh Paevez Jibon 3/17 (7 overs)

Legends of Rupganj won by 6 wickets
BKSP 3 No. Ground, Savar
Umpires: Imran Parvez and Shahin Al Asad
Player of the match: Mashrafe Mortaza (Legends of Rupganj)

- Gazi Group Cricketers won the toss and elected to bat first

Match 23
21 March 2024
9:00 am
Scorecard

Partex Sporting Club; 187(47 Overs)	v	Mohammedan Sporting Club; 188/6 (42.2 Overs)
Mizanur Rahman 51 (70); Abu Hider 3/32 (10 overs)		Mahidul Islam Ankon 70* (96); Azmir Ahmed 3/20 (6 overs)

Mohammedan Sporting Club won by 4 wickets
BKSP 4 No. Ground, Savar
Umpires: Barkatulylah Turkey and Ishtiaq Ahmed
Player of the match: Mahidul Islam Ankon (Mohammedan Sporting Club)

- Mohammedan Sporting Club won the toss and elected to field first

Match 24
21 March 2024
9:00 am
Scorecard

Shinepukur Cricket Club; 224 (49.4 Overs)	v	Gazi Tyres Cricket Academy; 151 (46.5 Overs)
Irfan Sukkur 38 (57); Maruf Mridha 4/41 (9.4 overs)		Shamim Mia 47 (81); Rishad Hossain 3/27 (7.5 overs)

Shinepukur Cricket Club won by 73 runs
Khan Shaheb Osman Ali Stadium, Fatullah
Umpires: Joynal Abedin and Mozahiduzzaman
Player of the match: Robiul Haque (Shinepukur Cricket Club)

- Gazi Tyres Cricket Academy won the toss and elected to field first

=== Round 5 ===
Match 25
24 March 2024
09:30
Scorecard

Abahani Limited; 217/7 (50 overs)	v	City Club; 165 (40.5 overs)
Afif Hossain 67* (83); Naimur Rohman 3/34 (9 overs)		Ifran Hossain 31 (34); Mohammad Saifuddin 3/20 (4.5 overs)

Abahani Limited won by 52 runs
Bangladesh Krira Shikkha Protisthan No 4 Ground, Savar
Umpires: Habibur Rahman and Sohrab Hossain
Player of the match: Mohammad Saifuddin (Abahani Limited)

- City Club won the toss and elected to field first.

Match 26
24 March 2024
09:30
Scorecard

Rupganj Tigers Cricket Club; 228/9 (50 overs)	v	Sheikh Jamal Dhanmondi Club; 229/4 (44.3 overs)
Salman Hossain 67 (87); Ziaur Rahman 3/35 (8 overs)		Saif Hassan 69 (69); Abu Hasim 2/35 (10 overs)

Sheikh Jamal Dhanmondi Club won by 6 wickets
Bangladesh Krira Shikkha Protisthan No 3 Ground, Savar
Umpires: Morshed Ali Khan and Nazmul Hasan
Player of the match: Fazle Mahmud (Sheikh Jamal Dhanmondi Club)

- Rupganj Tigers Cricket Club won the toss and elected to bat.

Match 27
24 March 2024
09:30
Scorecard

Prime Bank Cricket Club; 181 (49.1 overs)	v	Gazi Group Cricketers; 184/4 (46.3 overs)
Tamim Iqbal 54 (88); Abdul Gaffar Saqlain 4/24 (9.1 overs)		Sabbir Hossen 64* (83); Ashiqur Zaman 1/25 (7 overs)

Gazi Group Cricketers won by 6 wickets
Khan Shaheb Osman Ali Stadium, Fatullah
Umpires: Mozahiduzzaman and Sharfuddoula
Player of the match: Abdul Gaffar Saqlain (Gazi Group Cricketers)

- Gazi Group Cricketers won the toss and elected to field.

Match 28
25 March 2024
9:00 am
Scorecard

Legends of Rupganj; 178 (47.1 Overs)	v	Mohammedan Sporting Club; 179/4 (41.4 Overs)
Shamim Hossain 59 (80); Nasum Ahmed 3/30 (10 overs)		Rony Talukdar 92* (114); Abdul Halim 2/25 (7 overs)

Mohammedan Sporting Club won by 6 wickets
Khan Shaheb Osman Ali Stadium, Fatullah
Umpires: Kamruzzaman Limon and Shafiuddin Ahmed
Player of the match: Rony Talukdar (Mohammedan Sporting Club)

- Mohammedan Sporting Club won the toss and elected to field first

Match 29
25 March 2024
9:00 am
Scorecard

Gazi Tyres Cricket Academy; 225/9 (50 Overs)	v	Brothers Union; 229/8 (49.2 Overs)
Asraful Alom Asif 69 (98); Rahmat Ali 3/39 (10 overs)		Mahmudul Hasan 56* (53); Shamim Mia 3/32 (9.2 overs)

Brothers Union won by 2 wickets
BKSP 3 No. Ground, Savar
Umpires: Reazul Islam and Shyful Islam
Player of the match: Mahmudul Hasan (Brothers Union)

- Brothers Union won the toss and elected to field first

Match 30
25 March 2024
9:00 am
Scorecard

Shinepukur Cricket Club; 257/9 (50 Overs)	v	Partex Sporting Club; 129 (40 Overs)
Khalid Hasan 85 (114); Muktar Ali 2/44 (10 overs)		Zahiduzzaman 53 (70); Hasan Murad 4/21 (8 overs)

Shinepukur Cricket Club won by 128 runs
BKSP 4 No. Ground, Savar
Umpires: Amit Mojumder and Mahfuzur Rahman
Player of the match: Khalid Hasan (Shinepukur Cricket Club)

- Partex Sporting Club won the toss and elected to field first

=== Round 6 ===
Match 31
27 March 2024
9:00 am
Scorecard

Abahani Limited; 320/4 (50 Overs)	v	Rupganj Tigers Cricket Club; 180 (43.2 Overs)
Towhid Hridoy 125* (84); Abu Hasim 1/51 (10 overs)		Mahfijul Islam 48 (71); Mosaddek Hossain 3/3 (1.2 overs)

Abahani Limited won by 140 runs
Khan Shaheb Osman Ali Stadium, Fatullah
Umpires: Asadur Rahman and Morshed Ali Khan
Player of the match: Towhid Hridoy (Abahani Limited)

- Rupganj Tigers won the toss and elected to field first.

Match 32
27 March 2024
9:00 am
Scorecard

Sheikh Jamal Dhanmondi Club; 233 (50 Overs)	v	Gazi Group Cricketers; 192 (42.2 Overs)
Ziaur Rahman 55 (44); Abdul Gaffar Saqlain 3/31 (10 overs)		Moin Khan 42 (52); Mrittunjoy Chowdhury 3/41 (7 overs)

Sheikh Jamal Dhanmondi Club won by 39 runs (DLS Method)
BKSP 3 No. Ground, Savar
Umpires: Gazi Sohel and Imran Parvez
Player of the match: Shakib Al Hasan (Sheikh Jamal Dhanmondi Club)

- Gazi Group Cricketers won the toss and elected to field first

Match 33
27 March 2024
9:00 am
Scorecard

Prime Bank Cricket Club; 279 (50 Overs)	v	Mohammedan Sporting Club; 275/9 (47 Overs)
Parvez Hossain Emon 110 (111); Ariful Haque 3/20 (3 overs)		Mahidul Islam Ankon 78 (92); Saqlain Sajib 2/32 (9 overs)

Mohammedan Sporting Club won by 1 wickets (DLS Method)
BKSP 4 No. Ground, Savar
Umpires: Mozahiduzzaman and Islam
Player of the match: Mahidul Islam Ankon (Mohammedan Sporting Club)

- Mohammedan Sporting Club won the toss and elected to field first

Match 34
28 March 2024
9:00 am
Scorecard

Legends of Rupganj; 191 (47.2 Overs)	v	Partex Sporting Club; 195/3 (25.3 Overs)
Mizanur Rahman 88 (91); Shuvagata Hom 3/24 (9.2 overs)		Shamim Hossain 86* (43); Rakibul Atik 2/40 (6 overs)

Legends of Rupganj won by 7 wickets
Khan Shaheb Osman Ali Stadium, Fatullah
Umpires: Mahfuzur Rahman and Rakibul Islam
Player of the match: Shamim Hossain (Legends of Rupganj)

- Partex Sporting Club won the toss and elected to field first

Match 35
28 March 2024
9:00 am
Scorecard

Brothers Union; 222/9 (50 Overs)	v	Shinepukur Cricket Club; 196 (49 Overs)
Abdul Mazid 95 (135); Rishad Hossain 5/49 (10 overs)		Tanzid Hasan 41 (24); Rahmat Ali 3/30 (10 overs)

Brothers Union won by 26 runs
BKSP 3 No. Ground, Savar
Umpires: Barkatulylah Turkey and Joynal Abedin
Player of the match: Abdul Mazid (Brothers Union)

- Brothers Union won the toss and elected to bat first
- Rishad Hossain (Shinepukur Cricket Club) took his maiden five-wicket haul in List A cricket.

Match 36
28 March 2024
9:00 am
Scorecard

Gazi Tyres Cricket Academy; 214 (49.4 Overs)	v	City Club; 176 (49 Overs)
Tahjibul Islam 85 (120); Moinul Islam 3/37 (8 overs)		Sajjadul Haque 50 (70); Aridul Islam Akash 4/33 (10 overs)

Gazi Tyres Cricket Academy won by 38 runs
BKSP 4 No. Ground, Savar
Umpires: Ishtiaq Ahmed and Sohrab Hossain
Player of the match: Tahjibul Islam (Gazi Tyres Cricket Academy)

- Gazi Tyres Cricket Academy won the toss and elected to bat first

=== Round 7 ===
Match 37
30 March 2024
09:30
Scorecard

Gazi Group Cricketers; 204 (44.4 overs)	v	Abahani Limited; 207/3 (39.2 overs)
Mehedi Maruf 60 (73); Mohammad Saifuddin 2/24 (6 overs)		Anamul Haque 107* (118); Moin Khan 1/21 (4 overs)

Abahani Limited won by 7 wickets
Bangladesh Krira Shikkha Protisthan No 3 Ground, Savar
Umpires: Imran Parvez and Joynal Abedin
Player of the match: Anamul Haque (Abahani Limited)

- Abahani Limited won the toss and elected to field.

Match 38
30 March 2024
09:30
Scorecard

Mohammedan Sporting Club; 200 (48.4 overs)	v	Sheikh Jamal Dhanmondi Club; 195/8 (50 overs)
Mahidul Islam Ankon 70 (104); Taibur Rahman 3/19 (8 overs)		Saif Hassan 84* (120); Asif Hasan 2/23 (10 overs)

Mohammedan Sporting Club won by 5 runs
Khan Shaheb Osman Ali Stadium, Fatullah
Umpires: Mahfuzur Rahman and Shyful Islam
Player of the match: Mahidul Islam Ankon (Mohammedan Sporting Club)

- Sheikh Jamal Dhanmondi Club won the toss and elected to field.

Match 39
30 March 2024
09:30
Scorecard

Legends of Rupganj; 165 (43.3 overs)	v	Prime Bank Cricket Club; 167/5 (34.5 overs)
Aminul Islam 55 (106); Nazmul Islam 5/44 (10 overs)		Tamim Iqbal 35 (40); Shahidul Islam 2/42 (10 overs)

Prime Bank Cricket Club won by 5 wickets
Bangladesh Krira Shikkha Protisthan No 4 Ground, Savar
Umpires: Kamruzzaman Limon and Masudur Rahman
Player of the match: Nazmul Islam (Prime Bank Cricket Club)

- Prime Bank Cricket Club won the toss and elected to field.

Match 40
31 March 2024
09:30
Scorecard

Gazi Tyres Cricket Academy; 237/9 (43 Overs)	v	Rupganj Tigers Cricket Club; 166 (38.2 Overs)
Mohobbot Hossen Roman 63 (47); Abu Hasim2/27 (8)		Shamsur Rahman 58 (62); Shamim Mia 3/33 (9)

Gazi Tyres Cricket Academy won by 71 runs
BKSP 3 No. Ground, Savar
Umpires: Ariful Haque and Habibur Rahman
Player of the match: Mohobbot Hossen Roman (Gazi Tyres Cricket Academy)

- Gazi Tyres Cricket Academy won the toss and elected to bat first

Match 41
31 March 2024
09:30
Scorecard

Shinepukur Cricket Club; 176 (38.3 overs)	v	City Club; 84 (20 overs)
Khalid Hasan 47 (66); Ifran Hossain 4/26 (7.3 overs)		Sadikur Rahman 30 (28); Mukidul Islam 4/22 (4 overs)

Shinepukur Cricket Club won by 92 runs
Khan Shaheb Osman Ali Stadium, Fatullah
Umpires: Barkatulylah Turkey and Rakibul Islam
Player of the match: Naeem Ahmed (Shinepukur Cricket Club)

- City Club won the toss and elected to field.
- Points: Shinepukur Cricket Club 2, City Club 0

31 March 2024
09:30
Scorecard

Partex Sporting Club; 224/6 (43 overs)	v	Brothers Union; 225/6 (41.4 overs)
Mizanur Rahman 52 (83); Rahatul Ferdous 4/32 (9 overs)		Abdul Mazid 105* (102); Muktar Ali 3/53 (9 overs)

Brothers Union won by 4 wickets
Bangladesh Krira Shikkha Protisthan No 4 Ground, Savar
Umpires: Mozahiduzzaman and Shahin Al Asad
Player of the match: Abdul Mazid (Brothers Union)

- Brothers Union won the toss and elected to field.
- Points: Brothers Union 2, Partex Sporting Club 0

=== Round 8 ===
Match 43
02 April 2024
09:00
Scorecard

Abahani Limited; 190/9 (50 Overs)	v	Mohammedan Sporting Club; 195/2 (35 Overs)
Mahmudullah 54 (83); Tanzim Hasan Sakib 3/31 (10 overs)		Jaker Ali 78* (90); Abu Hider 1/25 (5 overs)

Abahani Limited won by 8 wickets
Khan Shaheb Osman Ali Stadium, Fatullah
Umpires: Masudur Rahman and Tanvir Ahmed
Player of the match: Jaker Ali (Abahani Limited)

- Abahani Limited won the toss and elected to field first

Match 44
03 April 2024
09:30
Scorecard

Sheikh Jamal Dhanmondi Club; 247/9 (50 overs)	v	Legends of Rupganj; 187 (44.4 overs)
Shykat Ali 93 (106); Al-Amin Hossain 4/44 (10 overs)		Aminul Islam 64 (85); Tipu Sultan 3/26 (10 overs)

Sheikh Jamal Dhanmondi Club won by 60 runs
Bangladesh Krira Shikkha Protisthan No 3 Ground, Savar
Umpires: Ali Arman and Barkatulylah Turkey
Player of the match: Shykat Ali (Sheikh Jamal Dhanmondi Club)

- Legends of Rupganj won the toss and elected to field.

Match 45
03 April 2024
09:30
Scorecard

Partex Sporting Club; 208/9 (50 overs)	v	Prime Bank Cricket Club; 211/6 (48.4 overs)
Mizanur Rahman 47 (44); Rubel Hossain 3/32 (9 overs)		Tamim Iqbal 74 (100); Rakibul Atik 2/28 (10 overs)

Prime Bank Cricket Club won by 4 wickets
Bangladesh Krira Shikkha Protisthan No 4 Ground, Savar
Umpires: Kamruzzaman Limon and Shyful Islam
Player of the match: Tamim Iqbal (Prime Bank Cricket Club)

- Prime Bank Cricket Club won the toss and elected to field.

Match 46
03 April 2024
09:30
Scorecard

Gazi Tyres Cricket Academy; 84 (25.4 overs)	v	Gazi Group Cricketers; 86/1 (19.3 overs)
Mohobbot Hossen Roman 41 (55); Ruyel Miah 5/18 (6 overs)		Pinak Ghosh 42* (59); Aridul Islam Akash 1/15 (4 overs)

Gazi Group Cricketers won by 9 wickets
Khan Shaheb Osman Ali Stadium, Fatullah
Umpires: Shafiuddin Ahmed and Sohrab Hossain
Player of the match: Ruyel Miah (Gazi Group Cricketers)

- Gazi Tyres Cricket Academy won the toss and elected to bat.

Match 47
05 April 2024
09:00
Scorecard

Rupganj Tigers Cricket Club; 110 (39.4 Overs)	v	Shinepukur Cricket Club; 111/0 (9 Overs)
Abdullah Al Mamun 20 (24); Hasan Murad 4/21 (9.4 oversv)		Jishan Alam 58* (28); Rohanat Doullah Borson 0/22 (2 overs)

Shinepukur Cricket Club won by 10 wickets
BKSP 3 No. Ground, Savar
Umpires: Amit Mojumder and Asadur Rahman
Player of the match: Hasan Murad (Shinepukur Cricket Club)

- Shinepukur Cricket Club won the toss and elected to field first

Match 48
05 April 2024
09:00
Scorecard

City Club; 251/9 (50 Overs)	v	Brothers Union; 231/8 (50 Overs)
Sajjadul Haque 70 (84); Abu Jayed 4/24 (7 overs)		Rahmat Ali 60 (69); Ifran Hossain 5/47 (10 overs)

City Club won by 20 runs
BKSP 4 No. Ground, Savar
Umpires: Mozahiduzzaman and Nazmul Hasan
Player of the match: Ifran Hossain (City Club)

- Brothers Union won the toss and elected to field first

=== Round 9 ===
Match 49
06 April 2024
09:00
Scorecard

Legends of Rupganj; 99 (28.3 Overs)	v	Abahani Limited; 101/2 (10.4 Overs)
Shamim Hossain 18 (14); Tanzim Hasan Sakib 5/23 (7.3 overs)		Mosaddek Hossain 48* (18); Al-Amin Hossain 1/35 (5 overs)

Abahani Limited won by 8 wickets
Khan Shaheb Osman Ali Stadium, Fatullah
Umpires: Ali Arman and Mozahiduzzaman
Player of the match: Tanzim Hasan Sakib (Abahani Limited)

- Abahani Limited won the toss and elected to field first

Match 50
06 April 2024
09:00
Scorecard

Sheikh Jamal Dhanmondi Club; 292/6 (50 overs)	v	Prime Bank Cricket Club; 219 (45.1 overs)
Saif Hassan 115 (120); Hasan Mahmud 3/64 (10 overs)		Tamim Iqbal 69 (70); Tipu Sultan 4/53 (10)

Sheikh Jamal Dhanmondi Club won by 73 runs
Sher-e-Bangla National Cricket Stadium, Dhaka
Umpires: Mahfuzur Rahman and Masudur Rahman
Player of the match: Saif Hassan (Sheikh Jamal Dhanmondi Club)

- Prime Bank Cricket Club won the toss and elected to field first

Match 51
06 April 2024
09:00
Scorecard

Gazi Tyres Cricket Academy; 40 (12 Overs)	v	Mohammedan Sporting Club; 41/1 (6.2 Overs)
Iftekhar Sajjad 16 (18); Abu Hider 7/20 (6 overs)		Imrul Kayes 19* (21); Aridul Islam Akash 1/4 (1 overs)

Mohammedan Sporting Club won by 9 wickets
BKSP 3 No. Ground, Savar
Umpires: Habibur Rahman and Ishtiaq Ahmed
Player of the match: Abu Hider (Mohammedan Sporting Club)

- Gazi Tyres Cricket Academy won the toss and elected to bat first

Match 52
7 April 2024
09:30
Scorecard

Shinepukur Cricket Club; 242/8 (43 overs)	v	Gazi Group Cricketers; 161 (35 overs)
Irfan Sukkur 84 (75); Ruyel Miah 3/48 (8 overs)		Sabbir Hossen 33 (47); Rishad Hossain 4/30 (7 overs)

Shinepukur Cricket Club won by 80 runs (DLS method)
Sher-e-Bangla National Cricket Stadium, Dhaka
Umpires: Joynal Abedin and Sohrab Hossain
Player of the match: Irfan Sukkur (Shinepukur Cricket Club)

- Gazi Group Cricketers won the toss and elected to field.
- Points: Shinepukur Cricket Club 2, Gazi Group Cricketers 0

Match 53
7 April 2024
09:30
Scorecard

Rupganj Tigers Cricket Club; 149 (39.1 overs)	v	Brothers Union; 116 (39.2 overs)
Shamsur Rahman 57 (80); Monir Hossain 3/19 (8.1 overs)		Abdul Mazid 28 (62); Abu Hasim 4/26 (8.2 overs)

Rupganj Tigers Cricket Club won by 31 runs (revised target)
Bangladesh Krira Shikkha Protisthan No 3 Ground, Savar
Umpires: Barkatulylah Turkey and Gazi Sohel
Player of the match: Rohanat Doullah Borson (Rupganj Tigers Cricket Club)

- Brothers Union won the toss and elected to field.
- Points: Rupganj Tigers Cricket Club 2, Brothers Union 0

Match 54
7 April 2024
09:30
Scorecard

Partex Sporting Club; 208/9 (42 overs)	v	City Club; 210/8 (41.4 overs)
Tanbir Hayder 69 (66); Naimur Rohman 3/43 (8 overs)		Ashik-Ul-Alam Naem 44 (53); Rakibul Atik 3/36 (8 overs)

City Club won by 2 wickets (DLS method)
Bangladesh Krira Shikkha Protisthan No 4 Ground, Savar
Umpires: ATM Ikram and Shyful Islam
Player of the match: Naimur Rohman (City Club)

- Partex Sporting Club won the toss and elected to bat.
- Points: City Club 2, Partex Sporting Club 0

=== Round 10 ===
Match 55
15 April 2024
09:00
Scorecard

Abahani Limited; 341/4 (50 Overs)	v	Prime Bank Cricket Club; 283 (49.4 Overs)
Najmul Hossain Shanto 118 (85); Hasan Mahmud 2/76 (10 overs)		Mushfiqur Rahim 111 * (105); Tanzim Hasan Sakib 3/44 (10 overs)

Abahani Limited won by 58 runs
Sher-e-Bangla National Cricket Stadium, Dhaka
Umpires: Asadur Rahman and Sajedul Islam
Player of the match: Najmul Hossain Shanto (Abahani Limited)

- Prime Bank Cricket Club won the toss and elected to field first

Match 56
15 April 2024
09:00
Scorecard

Partex Sporting Club; 205 (48.2 Overs)	v	Sheikh Jamal Dhanmondi Club; 208/5 (46 Overs)
Ahrar Amin 35 (39); Shafiqul Islam 4/32 (9 overs)		Nurul Hasan Sohan 76* (75); Ahrar Amin 3/42 (10 overs)

Sheikh Jamal Dhanmondi Club won by 5 wickets
Khan Shaheb Osman Ali Stadium, Fatullah
Umpires: Ali Arman and Rakibul Islam
Player of the match: Nurul Hasan Sohan (Sheikh Jamal Dhanmondi Club)

- Partex Sporting Club won the toss and elected to bat first

Match 57
15 April 2024
09:00
Scorecard

Gazi Tyres Cricket Academy; 150 (44.2 Overs)	v	Legends of Rupganj; 152/0 (19.2 Overs)
Iftakhar Hossain Ifti 30 (43); Shuvagata Hom 4/30 (10 overs)		Tawfique Khan 114* (66); Maruf Mridha 0/20 (4)

Legends of Rupganj won by 10 wickets
BKSP 3 No. Ground, Savar
Umpires: Kamruzzaman Limon and Mozahiduzzaman
Player of the match: Tawfique Khan (Legends of Rupganj)

- Legends of Rupganj won the toss and elected to field first

Match 58
16 April 2024
09:00
Scorecard

Mohammedan Sporting Club; 227/9 (50 Overs)	v	Shinepukur Cricket Club; 158/4 (27.4 Overs)
Imrul Kayes 56 (73); Nahid Rana 5/45 (10 overs)		Tanzid Hasan 36 (36); Nayeem Hasan 1/27 (7 overs)

Shinepukur Cricket Club won by 6 wickets
Sher-e-Bangla National Cricket Stadium, Dhaka
Player of the match: Nahid Rana (Shinepukur Cricket Club)

- Mohammedan Sporting Club won the toss and elected to bat first

Match 59
16 April 2024
09:00
Scorecard

Gazi Group Cricketers; 344/7(50 Overs)	v	Brothers Union; 178 (40.3 Overs)
Habibur Rahman Sohan 81 (55); Rahatul Ferdous 3/56 (10)		Abdul Mazida 51 (84); Abdul Gaffar Saqlain 4/34 (8)

Gazi Group Cricketers won by 130 runs (DLS Method)
BKSP 4 No. Ground, Savar
Player of the match: Habibur Rahman Sohan (Gazi Group Cricketers)

- Gazi Group Cricketers won the toss and elected to bat first

Match 60
16 April 2024
09:00
Scorecard

Rupganj Tigers Cricket Club; 297/8 (50 Overs)	v	City Club; 260/8 (41 Overs)
Shamsur Rahman 106 (93); Ifran Hossain 3/56 (10 overs)		Sajjadul Haque 69* (37); Arafat Sunny jnr 4/32 (8 overs)

Rupganj Tigers Cricket Club won by 5 runs (DLS Method)
BKSP 3 No. Ground, Savar
Player of the match: Shamsur Rahman (Rupganj Tigers Cricket Club)

- Rupganj Tigers Cricket Club won the toss and elected to bat first

=== Round 11 ===
Match 61
18 April 2024
09:00
Scorecard

Sheikh Jamal Dhanmondi Club; 88/10(22.4 Overs)	v	Abahani Limited; 91/0 (10.2 Overs)
Shykat Ali 23 (32); Shoriful Islam 4/35 (7 overs)		Mohammad Naim 53* (40); Shafiqul Islam 0/18 (3 overs)

Abahani Limited won by 10 wickets
Sher-e-Bangla National Cricket Stadium, Dhaka
Player of the match: Shoriful Islam (Abahani Limited)

- Abahani Limited won the toss and elected to field first

Match 62
18 April 2024
09:00
Scorecard

Prime Bank Cricket Club; 269/9 (50 Overs)	v	Gazi Tyres Cricket Academy; 128 (32.2 Overs)
Mushfiqur Rahim 71 (69); Shamim Mia 3/41 (10 overs)		Asraful Alom Asif 34 (53); Mahedi Hasan 4/24 (7 overs)

Prime Bank Cricket Club won by 141 runs
Khan Shaheb Osman Ali Stadium, Fatullah
Player of the match: Mushfiqur Rahim (Prime Bank Cricket Club)

- Gazi Tyres Cricket Academy won the toss and elected to field first

Match 63
18 April 2024
09:00
Scorecard

Shinepukur Cricket Club; 256/9 (50 Overs)	v	Legends of Rupganj; 189/9(50 Overs)
Irfan Sukkur 106* (88); Shahidul Islam 1/39 (8 overs)		Abdul Halim 60* (67); Nahid Rana 3/11 (8 overs)

Shinepukur Cricket Club won by 67 runs
BKSP 3 No. Ground, Savar
Umpires: Asadur Rahman and Ishtiaq Ahmed
Player of the match: Irfan Sukkur (Shinepukur Cricket Club)

- Legends of Rupganj won the toss and elected to field first

Match 64
19 April 2024
09:00
Scorecard

Brothers Union; 135 (34.3 Overs)	v	Mohammedan Sporting Club; 140/5 (23.2 Overs)
Mahmudul Hasan 45 (58); Nasum Ahmed 5/22 (10 overs)		Imrul Kayes 92* (71); Nur Mohammad 2/51 (6 overs)

Mohammedan Sporting Club won by 5 wickets
Sher-e-Bangla National Cricket Stadium, Dhaka
Umpires: Ariful Haque and Sajedul Islam
Player of the match: Nasum Ahmed (Mohammedan Sporting Club)

- Mohammedan Sporting Club won the toss and elected to field first

Match 65
19 April 2024
09:00
Scorecard

City Club; 180 (49.3 Overs)	v	Gazi Group Cricketers; 181/2( 24.1 Overs)
Hasanuzzaman 38 (29); Ruyel Miah 3/19 (7.3 overs)		Habibur Rahman Sohan 102* (81); Moinul Islam 2/86 (10 overs)

Gazi Group Cricketers won by 8 wickets
Khan Shaheb Osman Ali Stadium, Fatullah
Umpires: ATM Ikram and Shafiuddin Ahmed
Player of the match: Habibur Rahman Sohan (Gazi Group Cricketers)

- Gazi Group Cricketers won the toss and elected to field first

Match 66
19 April 2024
09:00
Scorecard

Rupganj Tigers Cricket Club; 259/8(5 0 Overs)	v	Partex Sporting Club; 262/7 (48.5 Overs)
Jasim Uddin 81 (111); Muktar Ali 3/51 (10 overs)		Tanbir Hayder 72* (80); Abu Hasim 4/43 (10 overs)

Partex Sporting Club won by 3 wickets
BKSP 3 No. Ground, Savar
Umpires: Imran Parvez and Kamruzzaman LImon
Player of the match: Tanvir Hyder (Partex Sporting Club)

- Rupganj Tigers Cricket Club won the toss and elected to bat first

== Relegation Stage ==
Match 70
23 April 2024
9:00 am
Scorecard

Gazi Tyres Cricket Academy; 172 (47.3 Overs)	v	City Club; 131 (39.3 Overs)
Hafizur Rahman 74 (129); Shohel Rana 3/19 (9 overs)		Sadikur Rahman 37 (53); Shamim Mia 4/21 (10 overs)

Gazi Tyres Cricket Academy won by 41 runs
BKSP 3 No. Ground
Umpires: Amit Mojumder & Kamruzzaman Limon
Player of the match: Shamim Mia (Gazi Tyres Cricket Academy)

- Gazi Tyres Cricket Academy won the toss and elected to bat first

Match 74
26 April 2024
9:00 am
Scorecard

Rupganj Tigers Cricket Club; 257 (49.5 Overs)	v	City Club; 170 (41.1 Overs)
Shamsur Rahman 101 (115); Ifran Hossain 3/51 (9.5 overs)		Moinul Islam 52 (65); Sohag Gazi 3/34 (10)

Rupganj Tigers Cricket Club won by 87 Runs
BKSP 3 No. Ground
Umpires: Mahfuzur Rahman & Ali Arman
Player of the match: Shamsur Rahman (Rupganj Tigers Cricket Club)

- Rupganj Tigers Cricket Club won the toss and elected to bat first

Match 75
29 April 2024
9:00 am
Scorecard

Gazi Tyres Cricket Academy; 206/7 (50 Overs)	v	Rupganj Tigers Cricket Club; 207/3 (34.1 Overs)
Tahjibul Islam 52* (44); Ariful Islam 1/19 (6 overs)		Jasim Uddin 77 (75); Shamim Mia 2/44 (5 overs)

Rupganj Tigers Cricket Club won by 7 wickets
BKSP 3 No. Ground
Umpires: Rakibul Islam & Zahedur Rahman
Player of the match: Mahfijul Islam (Rupganj Tigers Cricket Club)

- Gazi Tyres Cricket Academy won the toss and elected to bat first

== Super League ==
=== Round 1 ===
Match 67
22 April 2024
9:00 am
Scorecard

Prime Bank Cricket Club; 178 (39.3 Overs)	v	Abahani Limited; 183/5 (38.3 Overs)
Zakir Hasan 68 (70); Shoriful Islam 3/27 (8 overs)		Litton Das 56* (106); Sunzamul Islam 2/47 (10 overs)

Abahani Limited won by 5 wickets
Sher-e-Bangla National Cricket Stadium, Dhaka
Umpires: Nazmul Hasan & Tanvir Ahmed
Player of the match: Shoriful Islam (Abahani Limited)

- Abahani Limited won the toss and elected to field first

Match 68
22 April 2024
9:00 am
Scorecard

Shinepukur Cricket Club; 138 (34.5 Overs)	v	Gazi Group Cricketers; 125 (27.4 Overs)
Tanzid Hasan 42 (51); Abdul Gaffar Saqlain 3/21 (6 overs)		Habibur Rahman Sohan 44 (19); Rishad Hossain 4/31 (8 overs )

Shinepukur Cricket Club won by 13 runs
BKSP 3 No. Ground, Savar
Umpires: Ali Arman & Shahin Al Asad
Player of the match: Rishad Hossain (Shinepukur Cricket Club)

- Shinepukur Cricket Club won the toss and elected to bat first

Match 69
22 April 2024
9:00 am
Scorecard

Sheikh Jamal Dhanmondi Club; 259/2( 50 Overs)	v	Mohammedan Sporting Club; 263/5 (49.4 Overs)
Saif Hassan 120* (146); Nasum Ahmed 1/28 (10 overs)		Mahidul Islam Ankon 101 (122); Ripon Mondol 2/51 (10 overs)

Mohammedan Sporting Club won by 5 wickets
Khan Shaheb Osman Ali Stadium, Narayanganj
Umpires: Barkatulyah Turkey & Ishtiaq Ahmed
Player of the match: Mahidul Islam Ankon (Mohammedan Sporting Club)

- Mohammedan Sporting Club won the toss and elected to field first

=== Round 2 ===
Match 71
25 April 2024
9:00 am
Scorecard

Abahani Limited; 343/5 (50 Overs)	v	Gazi Group Cricketers; 172 (35.1 Overs)
Najmul Hossain Shanto 101 (84); Sheikh Parvez Jibon 2/50 (9 overs)		Sabbir Hossain 62 (68); Rakibul Hasan 4/44 (10 overs)

Abahani Limited won by 171 runs
Khan Shaheb Osman Ali Stadium, Narayanganj
Umpires: Mozahiduzzaman & Sajedul Islam
Player of the match: Najmul Hossain Shanto (Abahani Limited)

- Abahani Limited won the toss and elected to bat first

Match 72
25 April 2024
9:00 am
Scorecard

Shinepukur Cricket Club; 264 (46.1 Overs)	v	Sheikh Jamal Dhanmondi Club; 265/3 (46.2 Overs)
Jishan Alam 98 (61); Taibur Rahman 3/38 (10 overs)		Fazle Mahmud 101* (119); Hasan Murad 1/31 (10 overs)

Sheikh Jamal Dhanmondi Club won by 7 wickets
BKSP 3 No. Ground, Savar
Umpires: Habibur Rahman & Rakibul Islam
Player of the match: Fazle Mahmud (Sheikh Jamal Dhanmondi Club)

- Shinepukur Cricket Club won the toss and elected to bat first

Match 73
25 April 2024
9:00 am
Scorecard

Mohammedan Sporting Club; 317/6 (50 Overs)	v	Prime Bank Cricket Club; 284 (48.5 Overs)
Rony Talukdar 141 (131); Mahedi Hasan 2/72 (10 overs)		Mahedi Hasan 64 (45); Abu Hider 2/48 (9.5 overs)

Mohammedan Sporting Club won by 33 runs
Sher-e-Bangla National Cricket Stadium, Dhaka
Umpires: Moniruzzaman & Shathira Jakir
Player of the match: Rony Talukdar (Mohammedan Sporting Club)

- Prime Bank Cricket Club won the toss and elected to field first

=== Round 3 ===
Match 76
30 April 2024
9:00 am
Scorecard

Sheikh Jamal Dhanmondi Club; 267/9 (50 overs)	v	Abahani Limited; 273/6 (49.5 overs)
Ziaur Rahman 85 (58); Raqibul Hasan 3/29 (10 overs)		Afif Hossain 83 (88); Shafiqul Islam 2/60 (7.5 overs)

Abahani Limited won by 4 wickets
BKSP 4 No. Ground, Savar
Umpires: Ali Arman & Moniruzzaman
Player of the match: Mosaddek Hossain (Abahani Limited)

- Abahani Limited, elected to field first

Match 77
30 April 2024
9:00 am
Scorecard

Mohammedan Sporting Club; 255 (49.5 overs)	v	Shinepukur Cricket Club; 247 (49.4 overs)
Mehidy Hasan Miraz 58 (78); Arafat Sunny 3/34 (10 overs)		Marshall Ayub 70 (72); Abu Hider 4/51 (9.4 overs)

Mohammedan Sporting Club won by 8 runs
BKSP 3 No. Ground, Savar
Umpires: Mozahiduzzaman & Tanvir Ahmed
Player of the match: Mehidy Hasan Miraz (Mohammedan Sporting Club)

- Shinepukur Cricket Club, elected to field first

Match 78
30 April 2024
9:00 am
Scorecard

Gazi Group Cricketers; 181 (41.3 overs)	v	Prime Bank Cricket Club; 186/3 (31.3 overs)
Abdul Gaffar Saqlain 39 (54); Rejaur Rahman Raja 3/36 (10)		Tamim Iqbal 76 (74); Moin Khan 1/32 (5)

Prime Bank Cricket Club won by 7 wickets
Khan Shaheb Osman Ali Stadium, Narayanganj
Umpires: Habibur Rahman & Masudur Rahman
Player of the match: Tamim Iqbal (Prime Bank Cricket Club)

- Prime Bank Cricket Club, elected to field first

=== Round 4 ===
Match 79
3 May 2024
9:00 am
Scorecard

Abahani Limited; 303 (44.4 overs)	v	Mohammedan Sporting Club; 294/6 (50 overs)
Mosaddek Hossain 133 (101); Abu Hider 3/40 (8.4 overs)		Rubel Mia 65* (62); Nahidul Islam 3/44 (10 overs)

Abahani Limited won by 9 runs
Khan Shaheb Osman Ali Stadium, Narayanganj
Umpires: Imran Parvez & Shafiuddin Ahmed
Player of the match: Mosaddek Hossain (Abahani Limited)

- Abahani Limited, elected to bat first

Match 80
3 May 2024
9:00 am
Scorecard

Prime Bank Cricket Club; 341/7 (50 overs)	v	Shinepukur Cricket Club; 230 (46.3 overs)
Zakir Hasan 158 (132); Tushar Mia 2/63 (8)		Amite Hasan 104* (123); Hasan Mahmud 4/38 (6.3)

Prime Bank Cricket Club won by 111 runs
BKSP 3 No. Ground, Savar
Umpires: Joynal Abedin & Moniruzzaman
Player of the match: Zakir Hasan (Prime Bank Cricket Club)

- Shinepukur Cricket Club, elected to field first

Match 81
3 May 2024
9:00 am
Scorecard

Sheikh Jamal Dhanmondi Club; 280/9 (50 overs)	v	Gazi Group Cricketers; 286/8 (49.4 overs)
Shakib Al Hasan 107 (79); Abdul Gaffar Saqlain 3/37 (10)		Mahfuzur Rahman Rabby 125 (118); Arif Ahmed 4/44 (10)

Gazi Group Cricketers won by 2 wickets
BKSP 4 No. Ground, Savar
Umpires: Reazul Islam & Saidur Rahman
Player of the match: Mahfuzur Rahman Rabby (Gazi Group Cricketers)

- Gazi Group Cricketers, elected to field first

=== Round 5 ===
Match 82
6 May 2024
9:00 am
Scorecard

Shinepukur Cricket Club; 234/8 (50 overs)	v	Abahani Limited; 235/6 (46.1 overs)
Amite Hasan 77 (116); Raqibul Hasan 3/29 (10 overs)		Anamul Haque 110* (120); Naeem Ahmed 2/36 (10 overs)

Abahani Limited won by 4 wickets
Sher-e-Bangla National Cricket Stadium, Dhaka
Umpires: Imran Parvez & Moniruzzaman
Player of the match: Anamul Haque (Abahani Limited)

- Shinepukur Cricket Club, elected to bat first

Match 83
6 May 2024
9:00 am
Scorecard

Mohammedan Sporting Club; 176 (47.3 overs)	v	Gazi Group Cricketers; 123 (32.1 overs)
Mehidy Hasan Miraz44 (72); Wasi Siddiquee 4/42 (10 overs)		Masum Khan 29 (51); Nayeem Hasan 3/27 (9 overs)

Mohammedan Sporting Club won by 53 runs
BKSP 3 No. Ground, Savar
Umpires: Habibur Rahman & Saidur Rahman
Player of the match: Mehidy Hasan Miraz (Mohammedan Sporting Club)

- Gazi Group Cricketers, elected to field first

Match 84
6 May 2024
9:00 am
Scorecard

Prime Bank Cricket Club; 270 (50 overs)	v	Sheikh Jamal Dhanmondi Club; 71 (21.3 overs)
Zakir Hasan 85 (95); Arif Ahmed 2/40 (10 overs)		Yasir Ali 16 (24); Rejaur Rahman Raja 8/23 (6.3 overs))

Prime Bank Cricket Club won by 199 runs
Khan Shaheb Osman Ali Stadium, Narayanganj
Umpires: Mozahiduzzaman & Rokeya Sultana
Player of the match: Rejaur Rahman Raja (Prime Bank Cricket Club)

- Sheikh Jamal Dhanmondi Club, elected to field first

== Statistics ==
=== Most Runs ===
Player	Team	Inns	Runs	Ave	HS	SR
Mahidul Islam Ankon	MSC	16	647	46.21	101	70.02
Parvez Hossain Emon	PBCC	13	623	47.92	151	89.12
Saif Hassan	SJDC	16	618	44.14	120*	78.35
Anamul Haque	ABL	13	563	70.37	110*	89.64
Zakir Hasan	PBCC	11	549	54.90	158	93.84
Source: ESPNCricinfo

=== Most Wickets ===
Player	Team	Mat	Wkts	BBI	Econ
Abu Hider	MSC	16	31	7/20	4.91
Ruyel Miah	GGC	15	28	5/18	4.76
Hasan Mahmud	PBCC	14	26	4/15	5.29
Nazmul Islam	PBCC	15	25	5/44	4.13
Nasum Ahmed	MSC	16	24	5/22	3.97
Source: ESPNCricinfo

== Final standings ==
Position	Team
1	Abahani Limited
2	Mohammedan Sporting Club
3	Prime Bank Cricket Club
4	Shinepukur Cricket Club
5	Sheikh Jamal Dhanmondi Club
6	Gazi Group Cricketers
7	Legends of Rupganj
8	Brothers Union
9	Partex Sporting Club
10	Rupganj Tigers Cricket Club
11	Gazi Tyres Cricket Academy
12	City Club
