= 2023–24 National Cricket League =

Cricket tournament

- Dates: 12 October 2023 – 21 November 2023
- Administrator: BCB
- Cricket format: First-class cricket
- Tournament format: Double round-robin
- Host: Bangladesh
- Champions: Dhaka Division (8th title)
- Participants: 8
- Matches: 24
- Player of the series: Nayeem Hasan (Chittagong Division)
- Most runs: Mominul Haque (475)
- Most wickets: Nayeem Hasan (36)

The 2023–24 National Cricket League was the 25th edition of the National Cricket League, a first-class cricket competition held in Bangladesh. The eight teams were divided into two tiers, with Dhaka Metropolis getting promoted to Tier 1 after their victory in Tier 2 of the 2022 season, replacing Chittagong Division who were relegated. The tournament began on 12 October 2023 and ended on 19 November.

== Squads ==
As of 21 November 2023

Barisal Division	Chittagong Division	Dhaka Division	Dhaka Metropolis
Fazle Mahmud Rabbi (c); Abu Sayem Chowdhury; Iftakhar Hossain Ifti; LIslamul Ahsan Abir; Kamrul Islam Rabbi; Manik; Md Hafizur Rahman; MD Nuruzzaman; Md. Shamsul Islam Anik; Mohammad Ashraful; Moin Khan; Moinul Islam; Mojammel Hasan Shakil; Monir Hossain; Mosaddek Hossain Saikat; Rafsan Al Mahmud; Ruyel Miah; Salman Hossain Emon; Shahin Alam; Shahriar Sakib; SHAREAR SAKIB; Shochi Chowdhury; Sohag Gazi; Tanvir Islam; Zakaria Masud	Irfan Shukkur (c); Ahmed Sharif; Enamul Hoque Ashiq; Fahad Hossian; Hasan Mahmud; Hossain Shahadat Dipu; Iftekhar Sajjad; Mahmudul Hasan Joy; MD Ifran Hossain; Md Jasim Uddin; Md Sabbir Hossen Shikder; Mehedi Hasan; Mehedi Hasan Rana; Minhazul Abedin Afridi; Mohiul Islam Patwary; Mominul Haque; Nabil Samad; Nayeem Hasan; Noman Chowdhury; Parvez Hossain Emon; Pinak Ghosh; Rony Chowdhury; Sadikur Rahman; Saif Uddin; Sazzadul Hoque Ripon; Shahin Alam; Shakhawat Hossain; Shamim Hossain Patwary; Shykat Ali; Tamim Iqbal Khan; Tasamul Haque; Yasir Ali Chowdhury; Yeasin Arafat Meshu	Saif Hassan (c); Abdul Mazid; Arafat Sunny Jr; Joyraj Sheikh; Mahidul Islam Ankon; MD Anamul Haque; Md Raqibul Hasan Nayon; Mohammad Hossain Ali; Nadif Chowdhury; Nazmul Islam Apu; Ripon Mondol; Rony Talukdar; Rubel Mia; Salauddin Sakil; Shahbaz Chouhan; Shuvagato Hom Chowdhury; Sumon Khan; Taibur Rahman; Taufiq Ahmed	Shadman Islam (c); Abu Haider Rony; Aich Mollah; AKS Swadhin; Aminul Islam Biplob; Anisul Islam; Arafat Sunny; Arif Ahmed; Asadulla Al Galib; Azmir Ahmed; Iftekhar Sajjad; Kazi Anik Islam; Mahfijul Islam; Manik Khan; Md Al Amin Jr; Md Asif Hasan; Md Marshall Ayub; MD Sharifullah; Mehrab Hossain Johsy; Minhajul Abedin Sabbir; Munim Shahriar; Naeem Islam; Naim Sheikh; Qazi Onik Islam; Rakibul Hasan (SLAO); Rakin Ahmed; Rayan Rafsan Rahman; Shahbaz Chouhan; Shamsur Rahman Shuvo; Shohidul Islam; Zahiduzzaman Khan
Khulna Division	Rajshahi Division	Rangpur Division	Sylhet Division
Nurul Hasan Sohan (c); Abdul Halim; Afif Hossain Dhrubo; Al Amin Hossain; Amit Majumder; Anamul Bijoy; Awlad Hossain; Fardin Hasan Oni; Imranuzzaman; Imrul Kayes; Jawad Royen; Masum Khan Tutul; MD Aridul Islam Akash; Md Ashiqur Zaman; Md Mithun; Md Moinul Islam Sohail; Md Prantik Nawrose Nabil; Md Raihan Uddin; Md Salman Hossain; MD. Hasanuzzaman; Mehidy Hassan Miraz; Mrittunjoy Chowdhury; Nahidul Islam; Robiul Islam Robi; Sk Mahadi Hasan; Soumya Sarkar; Tipu Sultan; Tushar Imran; Ziaur Rahman			Zakir Hasan (c); Abu Bokkor Ahmed; Abu Jayed Rahi; Ahmed Abidul Hoque; Ahmed Sharif; Alok Kapali; Amite Hasan; Asadulla Al Galib; Ebadot Hossain; Enamul Haque jr; Imtiaz Hossain; Jaker Ali Anik; Jaynul Islam; Md Al Amin Jr; MD MIZANUR RAHMAN SAYEM; Mohiuddin Tareq; Nabil Samad; Nasum Ahmed; Nayeem Ahmed; Rahatul Ferdous; Rahman Rejaur Raja; SAYEM ALAM; Shahanur Rahman; Shamsur Rahman Shuvo; Shanaj Ahmed; Sofor Ali; Syed Khaled Ahmed; Tanzim Hasan Sakib; Taufiq Khan Tushar; Tawhidul Islam; Towhid Hussain Ferdous

== Venues ==
Locations of all stadiums which have hosted 2023-24 National Cricket League

Bogra	Chittagong	Cox’s Bazar	Dhaka
Shaheed Chandu Stadium	Zohur Ahmed Chowdhury Stadium	Sheikh Kamal International Stadium	Sher-e-Bangla National Cricket Stadium
Capacity: 15,000	Capacity: 22,000	Capacity: 7,800	Capacity: 26,000
	Zahur Ahmed Chowdhury Stadium		Sher-e-Bangla National Cricket Stadium
Matches:4	Matches:3	Matches:3	Matches:2
Khulna	Rajshahi	Sylhet	Sylhet
Sheikh Abu Naser Stadium	Shaheed Qamaruzzaman Stadium	Sylhet International Cricket Stadium	SICS Academy Ground
Capacity: 15,000	Capacity: 15,000	Capacity: 18,500	
	Shaheed Qamaruzzaman Stadium	Sylhet International Cricket Stadium	
Matches:3	Matches:4	Matches:1	Matches:4

== Points table ==
=== Tier 1 Point Table ===
Pos	Team	Pld	W	D	L	Pts	Relegation
1	Dhaka Division (C)	6	4	2	0	10	
2	Dhaka Metropolis	6	1	4	1	6	
3	Sylhet Division	6	2	1	3	5	
4	Rangpur Division (R)	6	1	1	4	3	Relegated to Tier 2

Updated to match(es) played on 21 November 2023. Source:
(C) Champion; (R) Relegated

=== Tier 2 Point Table ===
Pos	Team	Pld	W	D	L	Pts	Promotion
1	Chittagong Division (P)	6	5	0	1	10	Promoted to Tier 1
2	Khulna Division	6	4	0	2	8	
3	Rajshahi Division	6	2	0	4	4	
4	Barisal Division	6	1	0	5	2	

Updated to match(es) played on 20 November 2023. Source:
(P) Promoted

== Fixture ==
=== Tier 1 ===
Round 1

12-14 October 2023
Scorecard

Dhaka Division	v	Rangpur Division
166 (35.4 Overs); Rony Talukdar 102* (113); Nobin Islam 5/28 (10.4 overs)		238 (73.1 Overs); Mim Mosaddeak 71 (161); Salauddin Sakil 4/41 (18 overs)
223 (61.5 Overs); Taibur Rahman 66 (121); Asadullah Galib 5/68 (16 overs)		128 (41.1 Overs); Nihaduzzaman 56 (63); Anamul Haque 4/19 (7.2)

Dhaka Division won by 23 runs.
Sher-e-Bangla National Cricket Stadium, Dhaka
Umpires: Ali Arman and Tanvir Ahmed
Player of the match: Rony Talukdar (Dhaka Division)

- Rangpur Division won the toss and elected to field first

12-15 October 2023
Scorecard

Dhaka Metropolis	v	Sylhet Division
243 (85.2 Overs); Naeem Islam 65 (212); Nabil Samad 2/27 (21 overs)		251 (82.2 Overs); Zakir Hasan 104 (146); Abu Hider 3/43 (16 overs)
212 (74.5 Overs); Marshall Ayub 57 (99); Rejaur Rahman Raja 4/38 (10.5 overs)		116 (48 Overs); Jaker Ali 29 (41); Arif Ahmed 5/43 (19 overs)

Dhaka Metropolis won by 88 runs
Sylhet Outer Cricket Stadium, Sylhet
Umpires: Gazi Sohel and Mohammad Kamruzzaman
Player of the match: Abu Hider (Dhaka Metropolis)

- Sylhet Division won the toss and elected to field first
- Arif Ahmed (Dhaka Metropolis) and Mizanur Rahman Sayem (Sylhet Division) both made their first-class cricket debuts.

Round 2

19-21 October 2023
Scorecard

Sylhet Division	v	Dhaka Division
212 (71.2 Overs); Zakir Hasan 85 (158); Sumon Khan 5/47 (20.2)		256 (78.5 Overs); Rony Talukdar 63 (171); Khaled Ahmed 3/47 (19)
116 (54.3 Overs); Shamsur Rahman 29 (45); Nazmul Islam 5/38 (19)		75/3 (18.2 Overs); Abdul Mazid 26* (43); Nabil Samad 2/32 (9.2)

Dhaka Division won by 7 wickets.
Shaheed Chandu Stadium, Bogra
Umpires: Gazi Sohel and Moniruzzaman
Player of the match: Nazmul Islam (Dhaka Division)

- Dhaka Division won the toss and elected to field first

19-22 October 2023
Scorecard

Rangpur Division	v	Dhaka Metropolis
119 (34.1 Overs); Mehedi Maruf 34 (34); Shohidul Islam 4/25 (12)		173 (48 Overs); Marshall Ayub 45 (74); Abdul Gaffar Saqlain 4/40 (16)
464 (121.4 Overs); Nobin Islam 145* (218); Manik Khan 3/69 (17.4)		345 (78.1 Overs); Mohammad Naim 120 (124); Abdul Gaffar Saqlain 3/63 (15.1)

Rangpur Division won 65 runs.
Sher-e-Bangla National Cricket Stadium, Dhaka
Umpires: Ishtiaq Ahmed and Masudur Rahman
Player of the match: Nobin Islam (Rangpur Division)

- Dhaka Metropolis won the toss and elected to field first.
- Abdul Gaffar Saqlain and Anik Sarker Shatu (Both from Rangpur Division) Both made their first-class cricket debuts.

Round 3

26-29 October 2023
Scorecard

Dhaka Division	v	Dhaka Metropolis
133/1d (20 Overs); Rony Talukdar 77 (59); Qazi Onik 1/16 (5)		49/4 (20 Overs); Zahiduzzaman 16 (46); Sumon Khan 2/13 (5)

Match Drawn
Sheikh Kamal International Stadium, Cox's Bazar
Umpires: Mahfuzur Rahman and Shafiuddin Ahmed
Player of the match: Rony Talukdar (Dhaka Division)

- Dhaka Division won the toss and elected to bat first
- Day 1, 2 and 3 no play possible due to Cyclone Hamoon. Played 20 overs a side twice innings In day 4 and end of match
- Taufiq Ahmed (Dhaka Division) made his first-class cricket debut.

26-29 October 2023
Scorecard

Sylhet Division	v	Rangpur Division
415 (132.4 Overs); Shamsur Rahman 160 (252); Asadullah Galib 5/107 (25.4)		159 (59 Overs); Tanbir Hayder 62 (137); Khaled Ahmed 5/50 (17)
		230 (83 Overs); Myshukur Rahaman 36 (107); Abu Jayed 3/48 (13)

Sylhet Division won by an innings and 26 runs
Sheikh Abu Naser Stadium, Khulna
Umpires: Asadur Rahman and Mohammad Kamruzzaman
Player of the match: Shamsur Rahman (Sylhet Division)

- Rangpur Division won the toss and elected to field first
- Tawhidul Islam (Sylhet Division) made his first-class cricket debut.

Round 4

2-5 November 2023
Scorecard

Rangpur Division	v	Dhaka Division
158 (67 Overs); Ariful Haque 44 (100); Salauddin Sakil 6/31 (15 overs)		321 (95.3 Overs); Nadif Chowdhury 93 (132); Abdul Gaffar Saqlain 4/61 (21 overs)
178 (57.4 overs); Anik Sarker 69 (96); Nazmul Islam Apu 6/56 (21.4)		17/0 (3.2 overs); Rony Talukdar 10* (12); Asadullah Galib 0/8 (2)

Dhaka Division won by 10 wickets.
Shaheed Qamaruzzaman Stadium, Rajshahi
Umpires: Moniruzzaman and Shafiuddin Ahmed
Player of the match: Salauddin Sakil (Dhaka Division)

- Dhaka Division won the toss and elected to field first

2-5 November 2023
Scorecard

Dhaka Metropolis	v	Sylhet Division
601/5d (145.3 Overs); Shadman Islam 250* (437); Nabil Samad 3/115 (39.3 overs)		494 (156.5 overs); Shamsur Rahman Shuvo 101 (194); Arif Ahmed 3/110 (46 overs)
113/0 (23 overs); Mohammad Naim 62* (70; Jaynul Islam 0/23 (6)

Match Drawn
Sheikh Kamal International Stadium, Cox's Bazar
Umpires: Mozahiduzzaman and Shyful Islam
Player of the match: Shadman Islam (Dhaka Metropolis)

- Sylhet Division won the toss and elected to field first

Round 5

9-12 November 2023
Scorecard

Dhaka Division	v	Sylhet Division
266 (97.1 Overs); Mahidul Islam Ankon 106 (272); Nayeem Ahmed 3/50 (34.1)		211 (92.5 Overs); Rahatul Ferdous 62* (139); Nazmul Islam Apu 4/53 (35)
154 (55.2 Overs); Abdul Mazid 27 (75); Nayeem Ahmed 4/29 (16.2)		157 (71.2 Overs); Zakir Hasan 44 (94); Shuvagata Hom 4/50 (26)

Dhaka Division won by 52 runs.
Zohur Ahmed Chowdhury Stadium, Chittagong
Umpires: Gazi Sohel and Shahin Al Asad
Player of the match: Mahidul Islam Ankon (Dhaka Division)

- Dhaka Division won the toss and elected to bat first

9-12 November 2023
Scorecard

Rangpur Division	v	Dhaka Metropolis
435 (130.1 overs); Akbar Ali 179 (254); Shohidul Islam 3/48 (26.1)		295 (105.2 overs); Al-Amin 71 (150; Mahmudul Hasan 3/36 (15.2)
159 (46.3 overs); Akbar Ali 97 (121); Arif Ahmed 6/76 (21)		113/4 (35.5 overs); Mohammad Naim 36 (69); Nihaduzzaman 3/46 (13)

Match Drawn.
Sheikh Abu Naser Stadium, Khulna
Umpires: Joynal Abedin and Mozahiduzzaman
Player of the match: Akbar Ali (Rangpur Division)

- Dhaka Metropolis won the toss and elected to field first

Round 6

18-21 November 2023
Scorecard

Dhaka Metropolis	v	Dhaka Division
180/3d (47 overs); Mohammad Naim 63 (58); Shuvagata Hom 1/26 (17)		236/5d (46.2 overs); Mahidul Islam Ankon 100* (112); Asif Hasan 2/56 (14)
4/0 (1 overs); Azmir Ahmed 4* (6); Nadif Chowdhury 0/4 (1)

Match Drawn.
Sheikh Kamal International Stadium, Cox's Bazar
Umpires: Masudur Rahman and Shafeen Shareef
Player of the match: Mahidul Islam Ankon (Dhaka Division)

- Dhaka Metropolis won the toss and elected to bat first.
- Day 1 and Day 2 no play due to rain.
- Dhaka Division won the 2023-24 National Cricket League.

18-21 November 2023
Scorecard

Sylhet Division	v	Rangpur Division
125 (38.2 overs); Nasum Ahmed 32* (38); Abdul Gaffar Saqlain 4/30 (10.2)		181 (52.5 overs); Mahmudul Hasan 36 (63); Abu Jayed 4/60 (17)
442 (121 overs); Shamsur Rahman 128 (180); Rishad Hossain 2/55 (20)		185 (47.4 overs); Tanbir Hayder 40 (51); Nasum Ahmed 6/33 (16)

Sylhet Division won by 201 runs.
Shaheed Chandu Stadium, Bogra
Umpires: Ali Arman and Gazi Sohel
Player of the match: Nasum Ahmed (Sylhet Division)

- Rangpur Division won the toss and elected to field first
- Rangpur Division relegated to Tier 2.

=== Tier 2 ===
Round 1

12-15 October 2023
Scorecard

Chittagong Division	v	Barisal Division
238 (78.2 Overs); Pinak Ghosh 96 (178); Sohag Gazi 5/54 (22)		235 (82.2 Overs); Moin Khan 71 (109); Yeasin Arafat 3/56 (18)
308 (91.1 Overs); Yasir Ali 74 (73); Kamrul Islam 5/64 (18)		224 (86.1 Overs); Sohag Gazi 97 (132); Hasan Murad 4/79 (29)

Chittagong Division won by 87 runs.
Zohur Ahmed Chowdhury Stadium, Chittagong.
Umpires: Moniruzzaman and Sohrab Hossain
Player of the match: Sohag Gazi (Barisal Division)

- Barishal Division won the toss and elected to field first.

12-14 October 2023
Scorecard

Khulna Division	v	Rajshahi Division
288 (72.4 Overs); Afif Hossain 63 (50); Mohor Sheikh 3/56 (14)		81 (27.5 Overs); Junaid Siddique 25 (62); Soumya Sarkar 4/7 (5.5)
334/5d (76.1 Overs); Mohammad Mithun 125* (149); Mohor Sheikh 2/64 (12)		141 (38 Overs); Shafiqul Islam 37* (28); Al-Amin Hossain 2/15 (6)

Khulna Division won by 400 runs
Shaheed Qamaruzzaman Stadium, Rajshahi.
Umpires: Morshed Ali Khan and Mozahiduzzaman
Player of the match: Soumya Sarkar (Khulna Division)

- Khulna Division won the toss and elected to bat first.
- Aridul Islam Akash made his first-class cricket debuts.

Round 2

19-22 October 2023
Scorecard

Chittagong Division	v	Khulna Division
242 (76.5 Overs); Shamim Hossain 50 (64); Nahidul Islam 2/30 (12.5)		285 (73.3 Overs); Anamul Haque 110 (166); Nayeem Hasan 5/106 (27)
175 (64.5 Overs); Shamim Hossain 84 (132); Anamul Haque 2/2 (1.5)		136/9 (42.1 Overs); Afif Hossain 34* (47); Hasan Murad 6/21 (9.1)

Khulna Division won by 1 wicket.
Sylhet International Cricket Stadium, Sylhet.
Umpires: Ali Arman and Morshed Ali Khan
Player of the match: Anamul Haque (Khulna Division)

- Chattogram Division won the and elected to bat first.
- Enamul Haque Ashik (Chittagong Division) made his first-class cricket debut.

19-22 October 2023
Scorecard

Rajshahi Division	v	Barisal Division
209 (76.3 Overs); SM Meherob 65 (115); Tanvir Islam 5/59 (18.3)		233 (79.1 Overs); Moin Khan 50 (88); Nahid Rana 4/76 (21)
192(61.1 Overs); Sabbir Hossain 52 (65); Tanvir Islam 4/44 (23.1)		159 (61.3 Overs); Iftakhar Hossain Ifti 60 (140); Taijul Islam 4/55 (27)

Rajshahi Division won by 9 runs
Shaheed Qamaruzzaman Stadium, Rajshahi
Umpires: Moniruzzaman and Tanvir Ahmed
Player of the match: Taijul Islam (Rajshahi Division)

- Barishal Division won the and elected to field first

Round 3

26-29 October 2023
Scorecard

Rajshahi Division	v	Chittagong Division
309 (90.4 Overs); Sabbir Hossain 123 (122); Shykat Ali 5/38 (11.4)		437 (127.4 Overs); Mominul Haque 88 (115); Taijul Islam 5/119 (44.4)
182 (46.5 Overs); Sabbir Hossain 30 (22); Ifran Hossain 5/62 (16)		57/1 (10 Overs); Shykat Ali 28* (32)

Chittagong Division won by 9 wickets
Sylhet Outer Cricket Stadium, Sylhet.
Umpires: Masudur Rahman and Sajedul Islam
Player of the match: Nayeem Hasan (Chittagong Division)

- Rajshahi Division won the toss and elected to bat first
- Ashik-Ul-Alam Naem (Rajshahi Division) made his first-class cricket debut.

26-28 October, 2023
Scorecard

Khulna Division	v	Barisal Division
142 (53.1 Overs); Nahidul Islam 62* (119); Ruyel Miah 4/31 (11.1)		221 (82.5 Overs); Moin Khan 76 (103); Soumya Sarkar 4/43 (19)
225 (63.4 Overs); Soumya Sarkar 96* (109); Kamrul Islam Rabbi 4/29 (9.4)		147/3 (43.2 Overs); Moinul Islam 71* (118); Mohammad Mithun 2/24 (6)

Barishal Division won by 7 wickets
Shaheed Chandu Stadium, Bogra.
Umpires: Habibur Rahman and Manjurul Islam
Player of the match: Kamrul Islam Rabbi (Barisal Division)

- Barishal Division won the toss and elected to field first

Round 4

2-5 November, 2023
Scorecard

Chittagong Division	v	Barisal Division
298 (89.3 overs); Parvez Hossain Emon 82 (126); Kamrul Islam Rabbi 4/52 (21 overs)		200 (75.5 overs); Fazle Mahmud 54 (143); Nayeem Hasan 3/31 (22)
256/9d (66 overs); Mominul Haque 84 (137); Tanvir Islam 3/73 (22)		54 (40 overs); Salman Hossain Emon 9 (24); Nayeem Hasan 5/21 (15)

Chattogram Division won by 300 runs.
Sylhet International Cricket Stadium, Sylhet.
Umpires: Mahfuzur Rahman Litu and Ali Arman Rajon
Player of the match: Nayeem Hasan (Chittagong Division)

- Barishal Division won the toss and elected to field first

2-5 November, 2023
Scorecard

Rajshahi Division	v	Khulna Division
185 (59.3 overs); Sabbir Rahman 85 (139); Ziaur Rahman 3/24 (11 overs)		472 (135.1 overs); Nurul Hasan 125 (184); Taijul Islam 4/120 (41.1)
178 (54.4 Overs); Ashik Ul Alam Naem 41 (103); Al Amin Hossain 5/48 (12)

Khulna Division won by an innings and 109 runs
Sylhet Outer Cricket Stadium, Sylhet.
Umpires: Tanvir Ahmed and Kamruzzaman Limon
Player of the match: Nurul Hasan(Khulna Division)

- Khulna Division won the toss and elected to field first

Round 5

9-12 November 2023
Scorecard

Khulna Division	v	Chittagong Division
155 (55.4 overs); Soumya Sarkar 48 (92); Yeasin Arafat 3/31 (14)		189 (54.1 overs); Shamim Hossain 60 (54); Abdul Halim 3/41 (13)
294 (58.4 overs); Nurul Hasan 134 (142); Nayeem Hasan 7/75 (17.4)		262/6 (60.2 overs); Mahmudul Hasan Joy 54 (77); Al-Amin Hossain 4/60 (14)

Chittagong Division won by 4 wickets
Shaheed Qamaruzzaman Stadium, Rajshahi
Umpires: Ishtiaq Ahmed and Mahfuzur Rahman
Player of the match: Nayeem Hasan (Chittagong Division)

- Khulna Division won the toss and elected to bat first

9-12 November 2023
Scorecard

Barisal Division	v	Rajshahi Division
196 (66.1 overs); Moin Khan 63 (128); Shafiqul Islam 2/13 (9)		191 (68.3 overs); Sabbir Hossain 46 (59); Moin Khan 4/38 (15)
218 (65 overs); Sohag Gazi 50(60); Taijul Islam 7/76 (29)		224/5 (59.5 overs); SM Meherob 66* (92); Tanvir Islam 3/47 (25)

Rajshahi Division won by 5 wickets
Shaheed Chandu Stadium , Bogra
Umpires: Hafizur Rahman and Barkatulylah Turkey
Player of the match: Taijul Islam (Rajshahi Division)

- Rajshahi Division won the toss and elected to filed first

Round 6

18-20 November 2023
Scorecard

Rajshahi Division	v	Chittagong Division
189 (48.2 overs); Sabbir Hossain (81); Hasan Murad 4/73 (19)		290 (79.5 overs); Irfan Sukkur 99 (141); Sunzamul Islam 6/85 (28.5)
124 (44.5); Sunzamul Islam 36* (66); Hasan Murad 5/42 (15)		24/0 (2.2 overs); Mahmudul Hasan Joy 21* (11); Sabbir Hossain 0/6 (1)

Chittagong Division won by 10 wickets.
Zohur Ahmed Chowdhury Stadium, Chittagong
Umpires: Nazmul Hasan and Sohrab Hossain
Player of the match: Hasan Murad (Chittagong Division)

- Chattogram Division won the toss and elected to field first

18-20 November 2023
Scorecard

Barisal Division	v	Khulna Division
239 (73.2 overs); Tanvir Islam 64* (46); Mahedi Hasan 4/62 (27)		214 (76.4 overs); Anamul Haque Bijoy 62 (73); Tanvir Islam 4/83 (26.1)
46 (22.3 overs); Rafsan Al Mahmud 17 (23; Mahedi Hasan 8/10 (11.3)		75/1 (7.4 overs); Prantik Nawrose 33* (22); Tanvir Islam 1/25 (3)

Khulna Division won by 9 wickets.
Sheikh Abu Naser Stadium, Khulna
Umpires: Morshed Ali Khan and Shyful Islam
Player of the match: Mahedi Hasan (Khulna Division)

- Khulna Divisionwon the toss and elected to field first

== Statistics ==
=== Most runs ===
Runs	Player	Inns	HS	Ave	SR	100	50	4s	6s
476	Mominul Haque (Chittagong)	9	94	52.77	63.84	0	4	40	1
453	Naeem Islam (Dhaka Metro)	9	221	75.55	46.65	1	1	46	5
453	Shadman Islam (Dhaka Metro)	9	250	56.62	50.55	1	2	54	5
446	Shamsur Rahman (Sylhet)	8	160	55.75	58.76	3	0	44	5
444	Mohammad Naim (Dhaka Metro)	10	120	49.33	81.61	1	2	54	11
Last updated: 21 November 2023

=== Most wickets ===
Wkts	Player	Inns	Ave	Econ	BBI	SR
24	Nayeem Hasan (Chittagong)	8	16.58	2.42	5/106	41.12
21	Kamrul Islam Rabbi (Barisal)	8	18.00	3.20	5/64	31.71
17	Nazmul Islam Apu (Dhaka)	7	14.47	2.47	6/56	35.18
17	Salauddin Sakil (Dhaka)	7	12.71	2.77	6/31	57.53
17	Al Amin Hossain (Khulna)	8	14.53	2.78	5/48	31.41
Last updated: 5 November 2023
