= 2026 Bangladesh Premier League player auction =

Player selection for the 12th BPL season

General information
- Sport: Cricket
- Date: 30 November 2025
- Time: 4:00 PM (BST)
- Location: Radisson Blu, Dhaka

Overview
- League: Bangladesh Premier League
- Team: 6
- Expansion season: 2025–26

The players auction for the 2026 Bangladesh Premier League was held on 30 November 2025, at 4 PM (BST). Each franchise had to sign at least 13 locals and 2 overseas from the auction. Each team could spend a maximum of 4.5 crore BDT on locals and USD 350,000 on overseas players in the auction. Local players were dIvided in six categories and overseas were divided in five categories. The auctioneer was Orman Rafi Nizam, and the presenters were Samannoy Ghosh and Srabonno Towhida.

== Background ==
The first two editions of the BPL (2012 and 2013) utilized an auction system for franchises to acquire players for their squads. However, from 2015 to 2025, players were selected through a draft system.

With IMG taking over the organization of the BPL this season, franchises advocated for the return of the auction system. As a result, the Bangladesh Cricket Board has reintroduced the auction system for this BPL season.

== Player list (local) ==
=== Category A ===
local players list for Category A
SL	Players' name	Selling Price (BDT)	Remarks
1	Litton Das	7,000,000	Sold to Rangpur Riders
2	Mehidy Hasan Miraz	—N/a	Directly signed by Sylhet Titans.
3	Mustafizur Rahman	—N/a	Directly signed by Rangpur Riders.
4	Taskin Ahmed	—N/a	Directly signed by Dhaka Capitals.
5	Tanzid Hasan	—N/a	Directly signed by Rajshahi Warriors.
6	Mohammad Naim	11,000,000	Sold to Chattogram Royals

=== Category B ===
local players list for Category B
SL	Players' name	Selling Price (BDT)	Remarks
1	Mahmudullah	3,500,000	Sold to Rangpur Riders (Note: Was unsold in the first round.)
2	Shoriful Islam	4,400,000	Sold to Chattogram Royals
3	Mushfiqur Rahim	3,500,000	Sold to Rajshahi Warriors
4	Najmul Hossain Shanto	—N/a	Directly signed by Rajshahi Warriors.
5	Tawhid Hridoy	9,200,000	Sold to Rangpur Riders
6	Hasan Mahmud	—N/a	Directly signed by Noakhali Express.
7	Shamim Hossain	5,600,000	Sold to Dhaka Capitals
8	Nurul Hasan Sohan	—N/a	Directly signed by Rangpur Riders.
9	Parvez Hossain Emon	3,500,000	Sold to Sylhet Titans
10	Mahedi Hasan	—N/a	Directly signed by Chattogram Royals.
11	Tanvir Islam	—N/a	Directly signed by Chattogram Royals.
12	Tanzim Hasan Sakib	6,500,000	Sold to Rajshahi Warriors
13	Saif Hassan	—N/a	Directly signed by Dhaka Capitals.
14	Mohammad Saifuddin	6,800,000	Sold to Dhaka Capitals
15	Nasum Ahmed	—N/a	Directly signed by Sylhet Titans.
16	Khaled Ahmed	4,700,000	Sold to Sylhet Titans
17	Yasir Ali	4,400,000	Sold to Rajshahi Warriors
18	Mahidul Islam Ankon	3,500,000	Sold to Noakhali Express
19	Jaker Ali	3,500,000	Sold to Noakhali Express
20	Soumya Sarkar	—N/a	Directly signed by Noakhali Express.

=== Category C ===
local players list for Category C
SL	Players' name	Selling Price (BDT)	Remarks
1	Afif Hossain	2,200,000	Sold to Sylhet Titans
2	Abu Hider	2,200,000	Sold to Chattogram Royals
3	Ebadot Hossain	2,200,000	Sold to Sylhet Titans
4	Mahmudul Hasan Joy	3,700,000	Sold to Chattogram Royals
5	Mohammad Mithun	5,200,000	Sold to Dhaka Capitals
6	Mosaddek Hossain	—N/a	Removed from the auction for match-fixing suspicion.
7	Nahid Rana	5,600,000	Sold to Rangpur Riders
8	Rakibul Hasan	4,200,000	Sold to Rangpur Riders
9	Rony Talukdar	2,200,000	Sold to Sylhet Titans
10	Taijul Islam	3,000,000	Sold to Dhaka Capitals
11	Akbar Ali	3,400,000	Sold to Rajshahi Warriors
12	Mahfijul Islam	2,200,000	Sold to Chattogram Royals
13	Sabbir Rahman	2,800,000	Sold to Dhaka Capitals
14	Anamul Haque Bijoy	—N/a	Removed from the auction for match-fixing suspicion.
15	Zakir Hasan	2,200,000	Sold to Sylhet Titans
16	Mominul Haque	2,200,000	Sold to Sylhet Strikers
17	Ripon Mondol	2,500,000	Sold to Rajshahi Warriors
18	Shadman Islam	—N/a	Unsold
19	Aliss Islam (Note: Newly added in the updated list)	2,800,000	Sold to Rangpur Riders

=== Category D ===
local players list for Category D
SL	Players' name	Selling Price (BDT)	Remarks
1	Nahidul Islam	—N/a	Unsold
2	Habibur Rahman Sohan	5,000,000	Sold to Noakhali Express
3	Jishan Alam	1,800,000	Sold to Rajshahi Warriors
5	Mrittunjoy Chowdhury	1,800,000	Sold to Rangpur Riders
6	Nayeem Hasan	1,800,000	Sold to Rangpur Riders
6	Nazmul Islam Apu	1,800,000	Sold to Noakhali Express
7	Rejaur Rahman Raja	1,800,000	Sold to Noakhali Express
8	Sumon Khan	3,200,000	Sold to Chattogram Royals
9	Ziaur Rahman	3,000,000	Sold to Chattogram Royals
-	Alauddin Babu	—N/a	Removed from the auction for match-fixing suspicion.
11	Amite Hasan	—N/a	Unsold
11	Hasan Murad	1,800,000	Sold to Rajshahi Warriors
12	Ruyel Miah	2,300,000	Sold to Sylhet Titans
13	Abu Hasim	1,800,000	Sold to Noakhali Express
14	Tofayel Ahmed	1,800,000	Sold to Dhaka Capitals
15	Nasir Hossain	1,800,000	Sold to Dhaka Capitals
16	Kamrul Islam Rabbi	1,800,000	Sold to Rangpur Riders
17	Arafat Sunny	1,800,000	Sold to Chattogram Royals
18	Fazle Mahmud Rabbi (Note: Promoted from category E)	—N/a	Unsold
19	Irfan Shukkur	1,800,000	Sold to Dhaka Capitals
20	Mahfuzur Rahman Rabby	—N/a	Unsold
21	Musfik Hasan	1,800,000	Sold to Noakhali Express
22	Shahadat Hossain Dipu	1,800,000	Sold to Noakhali Express
23	Abdul Gaffar Saqlain	4,400,000	Sold to Rajshahi Warriors
24	SM Meherob	3,900,000	Sold to Rajshahi Warriors
25	Parvez Rahman Jibon	—N/a	Unsold
26	Ariful Islam	2,600,000	Sold to Sylhet Titans

=== Category E ===
local players list for Category E (only sold players are listed)
SL	Players' name	Selling Price (BDT)	Remarks
1	Mukidul Islam (Note: Relegated from category C)	3,300,000	Sold to Chattogram Royals
2	Mehedi Hasan Rana	1,400,000	Sold to Noakhali Express
3	Shykat Ali	1,400,000	Sold to Noakhali Express
-	Nihaduzzaman	—N/a	Removed from the auction for match-fixing suspicion.
4	Robiul Haque	1,800,000	Sold to Rajshahi Warriors
5	Shohidul Islam	1,400,000	Sold to Sylhet Titans
6	Shuvagata Hom	1,400,000	Sold to Chattogram Royals
-	Sunzamul Islam	—N/a	Removed from the auction for match-fixing suspicion.
7	Abdul Halim	1,400,000	Sold to Rangpur Riders
8	Abdullah Al Mamun	1,400,000	Sold to Dhaka Capitals
9	Maruf Mridha	1,400,000	Sold to Dhaka Capitals
10	Rahatul Ferdous	1,400,000	Sold to Sylhet Titans
11	Salman Hossain	1,400,000	Sold to Chattogram Royals
12	Sabbir Hossain	1,400,000	Sold to Noakhali Express
13	~~Shamsur Rahman~~	—N/a	Withdrew his name from auction list
14	Wasi Siddique	1,900,000	Sold to Rajshahi Warriors
15	MD Rubel	1,100,000	Sold to Rajshahi Warriors
16	Iftakhar Mahmud Ifti	1,400,000	Sold to Rangpur Riders

=== Category F ===
local players list for Category F (only sold players are listed)
SL	Players' name	Selling price (BDT)	Remarks
1	Mehedi Hasan Shohagh	1,100,000	Sold to Rangpur Riders
-	Monir Hossain	—N/a	Removed from the auction for match-fixing suspicion.
2	Rahamatullah Ali	1,100,000	Sold to Noakhali Express
3	Jayed Ullah	1,100,000	Sold to Dhaka Capitals
4	Zahiduzzaman	1,100,000	Sold to Chattogram Royals
5	Robiul Islam Robi	1,100,000	Sold to Sylhet Titans
6	Tawfique Khan Tushar	1,100,000	Sold to Sylhet Titans
7	Shakhir Hossain	1,100,000	Sold to Rajshahi Warriors
8	Moinul Islam	1,100,000	Sold to Dhaka Capitals

- BdCrictime
- BdCrictime (update)
- BdCrictime (after-auction)

== Player list (overseas) ==
list of sold foreign players (Note: excluding direct signings)
SL	Players' name	Country	Category	Selling Price (USD)	Remarks
1	Dasun Shanaka	Sri Lanka	A	55,000	Sold to Dhaka Capitals
2	Angelo Mathews	Sri Lanka	A	35,000	Sold to Sylhet Titans
3	Niroshan Dickwella	Sri Lanka	A	35,000	Sold to Chattogram Royals
4	Dushan Hemantha	Sri Lanka	B	25,000	Sold to Rajshahi Warriors
5	Jahandad Khan	Pakistan	C	20,000	Sold to Rajshahi Warriors
6	Haider Ali	Pakistan	C	20,000	Sold to Noakhali Express
7	Angelo Perera	Sri Lanka	C	20,000	Sold to Chattogram Royals
8	Zubaid Akbari	Afghanistan	C	20,000	Sold to Dhaka Capitals
9	Aaron Jones	United States	C	20,000	Sold to Sylhet Titans
10	Ihsanullah	Pakistan	C	28,000	Sold to Noakhali Express
11	Muhammad Akhlaq	Pakistan	E	10,000	Sold to Rangpur Riders
12	Emilio Gay	Italy	E	10,000	Sold to Rangpur Riders

- BdCrictime
- BdCrictime (after-auction)
- OneCricket

== Salary cap and rules ==
=== Segment-1 (Local Players) ===
Each franchise had to sign at least 12 local players from the auction and a maximum of 2 local players from direct signings. And they can keep a maximum of 16 local players in their squad.

Each franchise must purchase a minimum of 2 players from category A and B combined, 6 players from category C and D combined, and 4 players from category E and F combined.

And each franchise could not spend more than Tk. 4.5 crore in auction on local players.

Category	Base price (BDT)	Increment (BDT) (for every call)
A	50,00,000	500,000
B	35,00,000	300,000
C	22,00,000	100,000
D	18,00,000	50,000
E	14,00,000	30,000
F	11,00,000	20,000

=== Segment-2 (Overseas) ===
Each franchise could not spend more than $350,000 on overseas auctions and direct signings combined.

Category	Base price (USD)	Increment (USD) (for every call)
A	35,000	5,000
B	25,000	3,000
C	20,000	2,000
D	15,000	1,500
E	10,000	1,000

All players will be contracted under the tripartite agreement specified by the BCB. All franchises must pay 25 percent of the payment to the players upon signing, 55 percent before the last league match, and the remaining 20 percent after the tournament finishes.

A squad must not have more than 22 players, including reserves.

== See also ==
- 2026 Bangladesh Premier League
