= Gazi Group =

Bangladeshi company

- Formation: 1974
- Headquarters: Dhaka, Bangladesh
- Region served: Bangladesh
- Official language: Bengali
- Website: https://www.gazi.com/

Gazi Group (Bengali: গাজী গ্রুপ) is a Bangladeshi diversified conglomerate based in Dhaka. The founding chairman of Gazi Group is Golam Dastagir Gazi, former Textile and Jute Minister of the Awami League government.

Gazi Group owns the cricket teams Gazi Group Cricketers, Gazi Tyres Cricket Academy, and Rupganj Tigers, all of which play List A cricket in the Dhaka Premier Division Cricket League.

== History ==
Golam Dastagir Gazi founded Gazi Group in 1974 with the production of plastic and rubber products.

In 2002, the Gazi Tyre factory started manufacturing tires for commercial vehicles. It was the first tire company to produce tires for big vehicles in Bangladesh.

Gazi Television received its license to broadcast from the Bangladesh Telecommunication Regulatory Commission, along with several other privately owned Bangladeshi television channels, on 20 October 2009. It officially began broadcasting on 12 June 2012. In 2014 this channel bought television broadcasting rights from the BCB for ৳1.56 billion (US$13 million) for 6 years (from 2014 to 2020). In 2016 it also bought broadcasting rights of BPL from BCB.

In 2015, Gazi Group expanded production facilities for uPVC pipe, purchasing equipment from Rajoo Bausano.

Gazi Group donated medical equipment during the COVID-19 pandemic in Bangladesh in July 2020 to Narayanganj 300 Bed Hospital. It donated personal protective equipment to six hospitals in Dhaka.

=== 2024 fire ===
After the resignation of Prime Minister Sheikh Hasina and the fall of the Awami League government, five factories of Gazi Group were vandalized and looted in Rupganj Upazila, Narayanganj District. On 25 August 2024, the chairman of the group, Golam Dastagir Gazi, was arrested and detained at Detective Branch. Following his arrest, the Gazi Auto Tyre factory was set ablaze. Bangladesh Police did not respond to calls for help, while a team from the Bangladesh Army came and left after ten minutes. Ten thousand workers were employed in those five factories. The fire at the Gazi Tyre factory had been burning for more than 62 hours despite the Fire Service and Civil Defence claiming it had extinguished the fire in 22 hours and then 32 hours. 126 to 176 people are missing in the fire.

== Businesses ==
- Daily Sarabangla and sarabangla.com
- Gazi Home Appliance
- Gazi Communication Limited
- Gazi Door
- Gazi Food
- Gazi Group Cricketers
- Gazi Group Chattogram cricket team
- Gazi Networks Limited
- Gazi Pipe factories
- Gazi Pump
- Gazi Renewable Energy Limited
- Gazi Tank
- Gazi Tank Cricketers (renamed to Legends of Rupganj)
- Gazi Television Limited
- Gazi Auto Tyres
- Gazi Tyres Cricket Academy
- Rupganj Tigers
