= Tahjibul Islam =

Bangladeshi cricketer

Personal information
- Full name: Gazi Mohammad Tahjibul Islam
- Born: 23 July 2004 (age 22); Dhaka
- Batting: Left-handed
- Role: Wicket-keeper-batsman

Domestic team information
- Years: Team
- 2021–present: Shinepukur Cricket Club
- 2024: Durdanto Dhaka
- 2024: Gazi Tyres Cricket Academy
- 2024–25: Dhaka Metropolis

Career statistics
Competition	FC	LA	T20
Matches	6	25	11
Runs scored	231	592	92
Batting average	23.10	26.90	13.14
100s/50s	0/2	0/4	0/0
Top score	73	85	36*
Catches/stumpings	11/2	16/8	2/0
- Source: ESPNcricinfo, 15 August 2025

Gazi Mohammad Tahjibul Islam (born 23 July 2004) is a Bangladeshi cricketer, who plays as a left-handed batter and wicket-keeper. He started playing cricket at the age of 6, and later received training from the Bangladesh Krira Shikkha Protishtan.

In December 2021, Tahjibul was named in Bangladesh's under-19 squad for 2021 ACC Under-19 Asia Cup and 2022 Under-19 Cricket World Cup. He made his Twenty20 debut for Shinepukur Cricket Club on 16 June 2021, against Gazi Group Cricketers in the 2021 Dhaka Premier Division Twenty20 Cricket League. He made his List A debut on 30 March 2022, against Abahani Limited in the 2021–22 Dhaka Premier Division Cricket League. In February 2024, he was signed by Durdanto Dhaka to play for them in the 2024 Bangladesh Premier League.

At the age of 19, Tahjib was appointed captain of Gazi Tyres Cricket Academy for their initial season of List A cricket in the 2023–24 Dhaka Premier Division Cricket League. He scored 85, conceded no byes, and was named player of the match when Gazi Tyres won for the first time on 28 March 2024.
