= Sajjadul Haque =

Bangladeshi cricketer (born 1990)

Personal information
- Born: 10 January 1990 (age 36)
- Source: CricketArchive, 12 January 2023

Sajjadul Haque (born 10 January 1990) is a cricketer from Bangladesh. He made his debut for Chittagong Division in 2006/07, scoring 38 in a losing cause against Barisal Division. He made his Twenty20 debut for Gazi Group Cricketers in the 2018–19 Dhaka Premier Division Twenty20 Cricket League on 26 February 2019.
