= Rakibul Atik =

Bangladeshi cricketer (born 1999)

Personal information
- Full name: Rakibul Atik
- Born: 11 October 1999 (age 25); Sherpur, Bangladesh
- Batting: Right-handed
- Bowling: Slow Left Arm Orthodox
- Role: Bowler

Domestic team information
- Years: Team
- 2021–present: Gazi Group Cricketers
- Prime Bank Cricket Club
- Source: ESPNcricinfo

Rakibul Atik (born 11 October 1999) is a Bangladeshi cricketer, who bats right-handed and bowls slow Left Arm Orthodox. He represents the Gazi Group Cricketers in domestic cricket. In December 2020, he was selected to play for the Mymensingh Tigers in the 2020 Mymensingh Premier League. In May 2021, he was named in the Gazi Group Cricketers' squad for the 2021 Dhaka Premier Division Twenty20 Cricket League. He made his Twenty20 debut for the Gazi Group Cricketers, on 7 June 2021, against the Legends of Rupganj, and took a wicket. He made his List A debut on 8 April 2022, for Gazi Group cricketers in the 2021–22 Dhaka Premier Division Cricket League.
