= Mymensingh Premier League =

Cricket tournament

- Logo of Mymensingh Premier League
- Dates: 21 – 25 December 2020
- Administrator: Imago Sports
- Champions: Mymensingh Riders
- Participants: 6
- Player of the series: Shuvagata Hom
- Most wickets: 12

Mymensingh Premier League or MPL or Walton MPL was a franchise cricket tournament held in Mymensingh Division, Bangladesh. Every team had two National Team players. The tournament was held between 21 and 25 December 2020. T Sports will broadcast the semi-final and final matches. All matches will be played at Circuit house ground. The tournament is sponsored by Walton Group. Mymensingh Riders won the trophy after beating Mymensingh Thunders by eight wickets.

== Squad ==
Mymensingh Eagles: Mosaddek Hossain, Parvez Hossain Emon, Uttam Kumar, Fahim (wicket keeper), Rony, AKS Swadhin, Emon, Asif Pathan, Diganta, Ata, Mehedi, Munir, Kaiser, Asif and Sami.

Mymensingh Sixers: Nasir Hossain, Tanzid Hasan, Munir Shahriar, Prince, Sun, Emu, Mahin, Rony. Sagar, Shiblu, Ajay, Nijhum, Ananda, Hridaya and Ork.

Mymensingh Thunder: Shuvagata Hom, Towhid Hridoy, Abdul Majid, Swami, Ashiq, Shakib, Touhid, Titu, Afzal, Jimmy, Shaon, Anik, Noble, Ork and Krishna.

Mymensingh Tigers: Mohammad Ashraful, Rakibul Hasan, Rauhan Anas, Caesar, Sunny, Naimur, Shakil, Lincoln, Mithu, Robin, Pavel, Rubel, Rakibul Atiq, Sakin and Rakib.

Mymensingh Warriors: Akbar Ali, Arafat Sunny, Mujahidul Islam, Majed, Leon, Babu, Saad, Sagar, Raihan, Ashiq, Arafat. Arman, Sanchay, Ayon and Mahim.

Mymensingh Riders: Mahmudullah Riyad, Elias Sunny, Abir Akash, Moon, Tanvir, Shakib, Siam, Rakib, Tawfiq, Sajjad, Bipul, Naeem, Shaon and Pranoy.
