= Maruf Mridha =

Bangladeshi cricketer

Personal information
- Born: 15 May 2006 (age 20); Munshiganj, Dhaka Division, Bangladesh
- Batting: Left-handed
- Bowling: Left-arm medium-fast

Domestic team information
- Years: Team
- 2023/24: Gazi Tyres Cricket Academy
- 2024/25: Dhaka Metropolis
- 2024/25: Dhanmondi SC
- LA debut: 11 March 2024 Gazi Tyres Cricket Academy v Sheikh Jamal Dhanmondi Club
- FC debut: 26 July 2024 Bangladesh A v Pakistan Shaheens

Career statistics
Competition	FC	LA	T20
Matches	8	15	12
Runs scored	71	16	9
Batting average	11.83	5.33	9.00
100s/50s	0/0	0/0	0/0
Top score	38	5*	7*
Balls bowled	920	684	231
Wickets	11	21	13
Bowling average	49.27	30.76	26.30
5 wickets in innings	1	0	0
10 wickets in match	0	0	0
Best bowling	6/22	4/41	3/15
Catches/stumpings	0/–	0/–	2/–
Medal record
Men's Cricket
Representing Bangladesh
ACC U-19 Asia Cup
Winner	2023 UAE
- Source: Cricinfo, 23 May 2026

Maruf Mridha (Bengali: মারুফ মৃধা; born 15 May 2006) is a Bangladeshi cricketer from Munshiganj.

== Domestic career ==
Aged 17, Mridha made his List A debut in March 2024 for Gazi Tyres Cricket Academy in the 2023–24 Dhaka Premier Division Cricket League, taking 3 for 47 against Sheikh Jamal Dhanmondi Club in their opening match. After the first six matches, Mridha was the tournament's leading wicket-taker with 16 wickets.

== International career ==
=== U19 ===
A left-arm medium-fast bowler, Mridha was one of Bangladesh's leading players when they won the 2023 ACC Under-19 Asia Cup. He took 4 for 41 and won the player of the match award in the victory over India in the semi-final, and took 3 for 29 in the final against United Arab Emirates. A few weeks later he took 5 for 43 against India in the 2024 Under-19 Cricket World Cup.
