= Gazi Tank Cricketers =

Bangladeshi cricket team

- Nickname: GTC

Gazi Tank Cricketers are a team that played List A cricket in the Dhaka Premier Division in Bangladesh.

Captained by Mahmudullah, they won the title in 2013–14, the first season in which the competition had List A status, winning 11 of their 15 matches. Four centuries were scored, by four batsmen, of which Mahmudullah's 106 against Mohammedan Sporting Club was the highest. The best bowling figures were 6 for 18 by Rubel Hossain in the first match of the season against Khelaghar Samaj Kallyan Samity.

They played in 2014-15 under their new name, Legends of Rupganj, finishing fifth.
