= Abdul Gaffar Saqlain =

Bangladeshi cricketer (born 1998)

Personal information
- Full name: Abdul Gaffar Saqlain
- Born: February 14, 1998 (age 28); Saidpur, Nilphamari District, Bangladesh
- Batting: Right-handed
- Bowling: Right-arm Medium
- Role: Bowler

International information
- National side: Bangladesh (2026–present)
- T20I debut (cap 93): 17 June 2026 v Australia
- Last T20I: 19 June 2026 v Australia

Domestic team information
- Years: Team
- 2026: Rajshahi Warriors

Career statistics
Competition	FC	LA	T20
Matches	7	34	25
Runs scored	192	392	90
Batting average	21.33	16.33	15.00
100s/50s	0/0	0/1	0/0
Top score	45	52*	32
Balls bowled	1101	1,354	541
Wickets	23	53	24
Bowling average	25.47	22.35	25.04
5 wickets in innings	0	1	0
10 wickets in match	0	0	0
Best bowling	4/30	6/37	4/24
Catches/stumpings	6/0	23/0	6/0
Medal record
Men's Cricket
Representing Bangladesh
Asia Cup Rising Stars
Silver medal – second place	2025 Qatar
- Source: ESPNcricinfo, 4 June 2026

Abdul Gaffar Saqlain (Bengali: আব্দুল গাফফার সাকলাইন; born 14 February 1998) is a Bangladeshi cricketer. Saqlain is a right-handed batsman and a right-arm medium bowler who plays as a bowler. He has represented the Bangladesh A cricket team in the 2025 Asia Cup Rising Stars, where Bangladesh was the runner-up.

== Early life ==
Saqlain was born in Saidpur town of Nilphamari District district of Bangladesh, on 14 February 1998.

He is one of the players who never played cricket in a youth level as U16, U17, U18 or U19.

== Early career ==
Growing up, Saqlain primarily played taped-tennis cricket. His success in local tournaments in Saidpur attracted attention from coaches and selectors, contributing to his progression into competitive cricket.

== Domestic career ==
Saqlain made his List A debut for Gazi Group Cricketers against Rupganj Tigers Cricket Club at BKSP No 3 Ground on 12 March 2024. His first wicket in the DPL was Tamim Iqbal. He got popular after his performance in the 2025 Asia Cup Rising Stars. In the same year, the BPL team Rajshahi Warriors bought him for BDT 44 lakhs for the BPL 2026 season.
