= Abu Hider =

Bangladeshi cricketer (born 1996)

Personal information
- Full name: Abu Hider Rony
- Born: 14 February 1996 (age 30); Dhaka, Bangladesh
- Batting: Right-handed
- Bowling: Left-arm fast-medium
- Role: Bowling All-rounder

International information
- National side: Bangladesh (2016–present)
- ODI debut (cap 126): 20 September 2018 v Afghanistan
- Last ODI: 26 October 2018 v Zimbabwe
- T20I debut (cap 51): 20 January 2016 v Zimbabwe
- Last T20I: 22 December 2018 v West Indies

Domestic team information
- Years: Team
- 2012-present: Dhaka Metropolis
- 2014-15: Victoria Sporting Club
- 2016: Legends of Rupganj
- 2017-2019: Gazi Group Cricketers
- 2020: Mohammedan Sporting Club cricket team
- 2022: Brothers Union cricket team
- 2023: Agrani Bank Cricket Club
- 2024-2025: Mohammedan Sporting Club cricket team
- 2015, 2019, 2022-2023: Comilla Victorians
- 2016: Barisal Bulls
- 2017: Dhaka Dynamites
- 2019-20: Cumilla Warriors
- 2024: Rangpur Riders
- 2025: Khulna Tigers

Career statistics
Competition	ODI	T20I	FC	LA
Matches	2	13	70	144
Runs scored	1	58	1,913	1,197
Batting average	1.00	58.00	24.52	18.70
100s/50s	0/0	0/0	2/8	0/4
Top score	1	22*	141*	66*
Balls bowled	108	216	9,868	6,393
Wickets	3	6	206	208
Bowling average	29.66	55.00	28.79	26.39
5 wickets in innings	0	0	6	3
10 wickets in match	0	0	0	0
Best bowling	2/50	2/40	6/86	7/20
Catches/stumpings	1/–	2/–	37/–	49/–
- Source: ESPNcricinfo, 5 June 2026

Abu Hider Rony (Bengali: আবু হায়দার রনি; born 14 February 1996) is a Bangladeshi cricketer. He made his international debut for the Bangladesh cricket team in January 2016.

== Domestic career ==
=== Dhaka Premier Division League ===
Playing for Gazi Group Cricketers, he took most wickets (35 in 16 matches) in the 2016-17 season, which his team won.

In the next season he was retained by Gazi Group Cricketers. He took 17 wickets in 9 innings in the 2017–18 DPL.

In the 2019 DPL he played for Gazi Group Cricketers, where he took 7 wickets in 8 innings at an average of 50.00. His best bowling figures were 2/46.

He was signed by Mohammedan Sporting Club cricket team for the 2020 DPL. He got the chance to play just one match as the tournament was postponed due to COVID-19 pandemic. He took 1 wicket at an average of 43.00. His best bowing figures being 1/43.

He made a comeback in 2022 DPL in the jersey of Brothers Union cricket team by taking 17 wickets in 11 innings in an average of 29.05. His best bowling figure was 4/51.

In the next season he did not have a good season. He played for Agrani Bank Cricket Club. He took 12 wickets in 13 innings in an average of 49.41. His bowling figure was 3/65.

He came back strongly in 2024 DPL. He played the season for Mohammedan Sporting Club cricket team. He took 31 wickets in 16 innings in an average of 19.06. His best bowling figure was 7/20. He became the highest wicket taker of the tournament.

In the following season he was retained by the Mohammedan Sporting Club cricket team. He took 15 wickets in 11 innings in an average of 25.33. His best bowling figure was 4/66.

=== Bangladesh Premier League ===
==== Comilla Victorians ====
He was picked by Comilla Victorians for 2015–16 Bangladesh Premier League. In his debut season he took 21 wickets in 12 innings in an average of 15.04. His best bowling figure was 4/19. He became the second highest wicket taker of the tournament.

==== Barisal Bulls ====
In 2016–17 Bangladesh Premier League he was selected to play for Barisal Bulls. He took 4 wickets in 7 innings in an average of 53.75. His best figure was 2/34.

==== Dhaka Dynamites ====
He was selected to play for Dhaka Dynamites in 2017–18 Bangladesh Premier League. He took 15 wickets in 13 innings in an average of 19.93. His best bowling figure was 3/11.

==== Comilla Victorians ====
In October 2018, he was named in the squad for the Comilla Victorians team, following the draft for the 2018–19 Bangladesh Premier League. He took 3 wickets in 6 innings with an average of 40.00. His best bowling figure was 2/37.

==== Cumilla Warriors ====
He was drafted to play for the Cumilla Warriors in the 2019–20 Bangladesh Premier League. In the tournament, he took only 2 wickets in 10 innings in an average of 141.00. His best bowling figure was 1/19.

==== Comilla Victorians ====
He played for the Comilla Victorians in the 2021–22 Bangladesh Premier League. He took 4 wickets in 5 innings in an average of 30.75. His best bowling figure was 3/19.

He was retained by the Comilla Victorians for the 2022–23 Bangladesh Premier League. He took 3 wickets in 4 innings in an average of 27.33. His best bowling figure was 1/13.

==== Rangpur Riders ====
In September 2023, he was drafted to play for the Rangpur Riders team in the 2024 Bangladesh Premier League. He made strong comeback in this season of BPL. In a League stage match against Fortune Barishal he took a 5 wicket haul, which includes the wicket of Kyle Mayers, Mushfiqur Rahim, Soumya Sarkar, Mahmudullah and Mehidy Hasan Miraz. He took 5 wickets for only 12 runs in that match. In the season he took 9 wickets in 5 innings in an average of 10.55. His best bowling figure was 5/12.

==== Khulna Tigers ====
He played the season for the Khulna Tigers. He continued his good form. He took 17 wickets in 10 innings in an average of 21.64. His best bowling figure was 4/44.

==== Chattogram Royals ====
In November 2025, Rony was bought by the Chattogram Royals for ৳22 lakh, for the 2025–26 Bangladesh Premier League.

== International career ==
He made his Twenty20 International debut for Bangladesh against Zimbabwe on 20 January 2016.

In August 2018, he was one of twelve debutants to be selected for a 31-man preliminary squad for Bangladesh ahead of the 2018 Asia Cup. He made his One Day International (ODI) debut against Afghanistan on 20 September 2018. In November 2019, he was named in Bangladesh's squad for the 2019 ACC Emerging Teams Asia Cup in Bangladesh.
