= Dhaka Premier Division Cricket League =

Bangladeshi limited-overs cricket tournament

- Countries: Bangladesh
- Administrator: Cricket Committee of Dhaka Metropolis, Bangladesh Cricket Board
- Format: List A
- First edition: 1973–74; 2013–14 (as List A competition)
- Latest edition: 2025–26
- Next edition: 2026–27
- Tournament format: Round Robin
- Number of teams: 12
- Current champion: Mohammedan Sporting Club (1st title)
- Most successful: Abahani Limited (6 titles)
- Relegation to: Dhaka First Division Cricket League
- TV: Tsports & GTV; BCB YouTube Channel

The Dhaka Premier Division Cricket League, also known as the Dhaka Premier League, is a club List A tournament in Bangladesh which has been contested annually since the 1973–74 season. It has had List A status since the 2013–14 season. It is run by the Cricket Committee of Dhaka Metropolis.

== History ==
Since its inauguration in 1973–74 the league has been the premier club cricket competition in Bangladesh. Occupying more than 200 players for two months each year, it is widely regarded as the "finishing school" for cricketers in Bangladesh. It gained List A status starting with the 2013–14 tournament, thus superseding the National Cricket League One-Day as Bangladesh's main List A competition.

From 1973–74 to 2011–12, Abahani Limited won the championship 17 times. Other winners were Mohammedan Sporting Club (nine titles), Biman Bangladesh Airlines (five titles), Victoria Sporting Club (four titles), Old DOHS Sports Club (two titles) and Brothers Union (one title). The tournament was not held in 2012–13.

To commemorate the centenary of the birth of the founding father of Bangladesh, Bangabandhu Sheikh Mujibur Rahman, the 2019–20 season of the league was named "Bangabandhu Dhaka Premier Division Cricket League 2019–20". However, the competition was postponed shortly after starting and later abandoned, owing to the COVID-19 pandemic. The next tournament, in 2021–22, was officially named the "Bangabandhu Dhaka Premier Division Cricket League 2021–2022 sponsored by Walton".

== List A winners ==
Since the tournament gained List A status, the winners have been:

- 2013–14: Gazi Tank Cricketers
- 2014–15: Prime Bank
- 2015–16: Abahani Limited
- 2016–17: Gazi Group Cricketers
- 2017–18: Abahani Limited
- 2018–19: Abahani Limited
- 2019–20: abandoned due to COVID-19 pandemic
- 2020–21: cancelled due to COVID-19 pandemic
- 2021–22: Sheikh Jamal Dhanmondi Club
- 2022–23: Abahani Limited
- 2023–24: Abahani Limited
- 2024–25: Abahani Limited
- 2025–26: Mohammedan Sporting Club

== Format ==
The competition is played as a round-robin of 12 teams, followed by play-off rounds among the top six teams for the championship and among the lowest three teams to determine relegation. However, the 2025–26 tournament ends after the 12-team round-robin.

The 2013–14 competition ran from September to November 2014; the 2014–15 competition ran from November 2014 to January 2015; the 2015–16 competition ran from April to June 2016; the 2016–17 competition ran from April to June 2017; the 2017–18 competition ran from February to April 2018; the 2018–19 competition ran from March to April 2019; the 2019–20 competition began in March 2020, but was almost immediately postponed owing to the COVID-19 pandemic; the next tournament, 2021–22, ran from March to April 2022, and the 2022–23 tournament ran from March to May 2023.

All matches are played on neutral grounds in the Dhaka area. In 2016–17 only three grounds were used: Khan Shaheb Osman Ali Stadium in Fatullah, and Bangladesh Krira Shikkha Protisthan No 3 and No 4 Grounds in Savar. The same three grounds were used in 2017–18 and 2018–19, as well as Sher-e-Bangla National Cricket Stadium in Mirpur.

== Players ==
The system of allocating players to clubs varies from season to season, but has elements of lottery. Players frequently change clubs between seasons. Imrul Kayes, for example, played for Victoria Sporting Club in 2006–07 and 2014–15, Mohammedan Sporting Club in 2007–08, 2011–12, 2022–23 and 2023–24, Gazi Tank Cricketers in 2008–09 and 2013–14, Abahani Limited in 2009–10 and 2010–11, Brothers Union in 2015–16, Sheikh Jamal Dhanmondi Club in 2016–17 and 2021–22, Gazi Group Cricketers in 2017–18 and 2018–19, and Agrani Bank in 2024–25 and 2025–26. Of the 22 players who appeared for Brothers Union in 2013–14, only two were among the 20 Brothers Union players in 2014–15.

From the 1980s to the 2019–20 competition most teams included players from outside Bangladesh. In 2013–14 82 foreign players played in the competition. Beginning with the 2015–16 competition, only one foreign player has been allowed in any playing eleven, although clubs are allowed to have several foreign players on their list; in 2015–16 36 foreign players took part, including 22 Indians and 10 Sri Lankans. Foreign players were excluded from the 2019–20 competition, but were allowed again for the 2021–22 competition, with no more than one foreign player per team per match. There were no foreign players in the 2023–24 tournament, as most of the clubs were unable to afford the cost.

== Teams ==
There are 12 teams in each tournament, changing each season with promotion and relegation. The two lowest-finishing teams are demoted to the second division, the Dhaka First Division Cricket League, for the next season, and the top two teams in the Dhaka First Division Cricket League are promoted.

In the first 12 List A seasons, 25 teams competed. Their final positions at the end of each tournament are as follows.

Teams	2013 –14	2014 –15	2015 –16	2016 –17	2017 –18	2018 –19	2019 –20	2021 –22	2022 –23	2023 –24	2024 –25	2025 –26
Abahani	9	4	W	3	W	W	b	4	W	W	W	2
Agrani Bank					11				11		6	6
BKSP						12						
Brothers Union	7	8	10	8	10	10	b	9	9	8	10	d
City Club								10	8	12		8
CC School	a		11									
Dhaka Leopards									12			5
Bashundhara Str	2	9	9	6	3	4	b	W	2	5	8	7
Gazi Group			8	W	6	8	b	6	6	6	3	9
Gazi Tank	W											
Gazi Tyres										11		
Gulshan CC											5	11
Kala Bagan CA	6	3	12									
Kala Bagan KC	10	10	8	9	12							
Khelaghar SKS	11			10	5	9	b	11				
Legends of Rupganj		5	3	7	2	2	b	2	4	7	4	4
Mohammedan SC	4	6	5	5	7	6	b	7	5	2	2	W
Old DOHS		12					b					
Partex SC		11		12			b			9	11	
Prime Bank	5	W	6	4	9	5	b	3	3	3	7	3
Prime Doleshwar SC	3	4	2	2	4	3	b	c				
Rupganj Tigers								5	7	10	9	10
Shinepukur					8	7	b	8	10	4	12	
Uttara SC						11						
Victoria SC	8	7	4	11								

W = Winners
a. Cricket Coaching School played the first six matches in 2013–14 but were demoted immediately after failing to arrive at their seventh match in time to play.
b. These teams competed in 2019–20, but owing to the COVID-19 pandemic, the tournament was abandoned shortly after it began. The pandemic also prevented the 2020–21 tournament from going ahead.
c. Prime Doleshwar were scheduled to take part in 2021–22, but withdrew shortly before the tournament began, leaving 11 teams.
d. Brothers Union were demoted after the players refused to play in the ninth-round match in 2025–26 owing to a dispute with the team management.

== Records ==
=== Highest score ===
- 2013–14 – 157 not out by Ravi Bopara (Prime Bank)
- 2014–15 – 161 not out by Chamara Kapugedera (Victoria Sporting Club)
- 2015–16 – 142 by Tamim Iqbal (Abahani Limited)
- 2016–17 – 190 by Raqibul Hasan (Mohammedan Sporting Club)
- 2017–18 – 154 by Soumya Sarkar (Agrani Bank Cricket Club)
- 2018–19 – 208* by Soumya Sarkar (Abahani Limited)
- 2021–22 – 184 by Anamul Haque (Prime Bank)
- 2022–23 – 153 by Anamul Haque (Abahani Limited)
- 2023–24 – 158 by Zakir Hasan (Prime Bank)
- 2024–25 – 176 by Mohammad Naim (Prime Bank)

=== Best bowling figures ===
- 2013–14 – 7 for 25 by Sean Williams (Brothers Union)
- 2014–15 – 6 for 33 by Naeem Islam (Legends of Rupganj)
- 2015–16 – 7 for 58 by Saqlain Sajib (Abahani Limited)
- 2016–17 – 6 for 18 by Tanvir Islam (Khelaghar Samaj Kallyan Samity)
- 2017–18 – 8 for 40 by Yeasin Arafat (Gazi Group Cricketers)
- 2018–19 – 6 for 46 by Mashrafe Mortaza (Abahani Limited)
- 2021–22 – 6 for 22 by Al-Amin (Gazi Group Cricketers)
- 2022–23 – 6 for 30 by Raihan Uddin (Dhaka Leopards)
- 2023–24 – 8 for 23 by Rejaur Rahman Raja (Prime Bank)
- 2024–25 – 6 for 40 by Shoriful Islam (Legends of Rupganj)

=== Most runs in a season ===
- 2013–14 – 670 by Ravi Bopara (Prime Bank)
- 2014–15 – 714 by Rony Talukdar (Prime Doleshwar Sporting Club)
- 2015–16 – 719 by Raqibul Hasan (Prime Doleshwar)
- 2016–17 – 752 by Liton Das (Abahani Limited)
- 2017–18 – 749 by Nazmul Hossain Shanto (Abahani Limited)
- 2018–19 – 814 by Saif Hassan (Prime Doleshwar)
- 2021–22 – 1138 by Anamul Haque (Prime Bank)
- 2022–23 – 864 by Mohammad Naim (Abahani Limited)
- 2023–24 – 647 by Mahidul Islam Ankon (Mohammedan Sporting Club)
- 2024–25 – 874 by Anamul Haque (Gazi Group Cricketers)

=== Most wickets in a season ===
- 2013–14 – 29 by Arafat Sunny (Gazi Tank Cricketers) and Farhad Reza (Prime Doleshwar)
- 2014–15 – 31 by Elias Sunny (Prime Doleshwar)
- 2015–16 – 30 by Chaturanga de Silva (Victoria Sporting Club)
- 2016–17 – 35 by Abu Haider (Gazi Group Cricketers)
- 2017–18 – 39 by Mashrafe Mortaza (Abahani Limited)
- 2018–19 – 38 by Farhad Reza (Prime Doleshwar)
- 2021–22 – 29 by Rakibul Hasan (Prime Bank)
- 2022–23 – 31 by Parvez Rasool (Sheikh Jamal Dhanmondi)
- 2023–24 – 31 by Abu Hider (Mohammedan Sporting Club)
- 2024–25 – 30 by Rakibul Hasan (Abahani Limited) and Mosaddek Hossain (Abahani Limited)

=== Other records ===
The fastest century is by Habibur Rahman, who reached 100 off 45 balls for Legends of Rupganj against City Club in 2025–26, and finished with 130 off 58 balls. The record was previously held by Brendan Taylor, who reached 100 off 46 balls for Prime Bank against Kalabagan Cricket Academy in 2013–14.

The highest team score is 422 for 8 by Prime Bank against Brothers Union in 2024–25.
