= Nobin Islam =

Bangladeshi cricketer (born 1996)

Personal information
- Born: 25 December 1996 (age 29); Dinajpur, Bangladesh
- Source: ESPNcricinfo, 25 September 2016

Nobin Islam (born 25 December 1996) is a Bangladeshi first-class cricketer who plays for Rangpur Division.

== See also ==
- List of Rangpur Division cricketers
