= Shahidul Islam (cricketer, born 1982) =

Bangladeshi cricketer (born 1982)

Personal information
- Born: 25 January 1982 (age 44); Khulna, Bangladesh
- Batting: Unknown
- Bowling: Unknown

International information
- National side: Bangladeshi

Career statistics
Competition	First-class
Matches	1
Runs scored	35
Batting average	17.50
100s/50s	0/0
Top score	30
Balls bowled	162
Wickets	0
Bowling average	-
5 wickets in innings	0
10 wickets in match	0
Best bowling	-
Catches/stumpings	-/-

Shahidul Islam is a first-class cricketer from Bangladesh. He was born on 25 January 1982 in Jhalakati, Khulna and is sometimes referred to by his nickname Saikat. He scored 30 and 5 in his only first-class cricket match, for Barisal Division in the 2001-02 season, but went for over a hundred runs without taking a wicket.
