= Sadikur Rahman =

Bangladeshi cricketer (born 1992)

Personal information
- Born: 18 November 1992 (age 33)

Domestic team information
- Years: Team
- 2017-present: Chittagong Division

Career statistics
Competition	FC	LA	T20
Matches	28	54	13
Runs scored	1,311	1,437	221
Batting average	27.89	27.63	18.41
100s/50s	3/4	1/8	0/1
Top score	122	105*	58*
Balls bowled	6	133	–
Wickets	0	5	–
Bowling average	–	25.20	–
5 wickets in innings	0	0	–
10 wickets in match	0	0	–
Best bowling	–	2/46	–
Catches/stumpings	17/–	26/-	4/-
- Source: ESPNcricinfo, 5 June 2026

Sadikur Rahman (born 18 November 1992) is a Bangladeshi cricketer. He made his first-class debut for Chittagong Division in the 2017–18 National Cricket League on 6 October 2017. He made his List A debut for Khelaghar Samaj Kallyan Samity in the 2017–18 Dhaka Premier Division Cricket League on 5 February 2018.

He was the leading run-scorer for Chittagong Division in the 2018–19 National Cricket League, with 322 runs in six matches.

He made his Twenty20 debut for Khelaghar Samaj Kallyan Samity in the 2018–19 Dhaka Premier Division Twenty20 Cricket League on 25 February 2019.
