= Rupganj Tigers Cricket Club =

Bangladeshi List A cricket team

- Nickname: RTC

Personnel
- Captain: Al-Amin
- Owner: Gazi Group

Rupganj Tigers Cricket Club are a team that plays List A cricket in the Dhaka Premier Division Cricket League (DPL) in Bangladesh. They are named after Rupganj in eastern Dhaka, and sponsored by the Gazi Group of companies, which also sponsors the DPL teams Gazi Tyres Cricket Academy and Gazi Group Cricketers.

Rupganj Tigers were promoted to List A status for the first time for the 2021–22 tournament, along with City Club. They played their first match against Abahani Limited on 15 March 2022, winning by seven wickets.

In the 2023–24 tournament, Rupganj Tigers finished eleventh after the round-robin rounds. In the Relegation League matches that followed, they defeated both their opponents, and thus avoided relegation.

== List A record ==
- 2021–22: 15 matches, won 6, finished fifth
- 2022–23: 11 matches, won 4, finished seventh
- 2023–24: 13 matches, won 4, finished tenth
- 2024–25: 11 matches, won 3, finished ninth
- 2025–26: 11 matches, won 3, finished tenth

== Records ==
The highest List A score for Rupganj Tigers is 124 by Zakir Hasan in 2021–22, and the best bowling figures are 5 for 35 by Alauddin Babu in 2022–23.
