= Gazi Tyres Cricket Academy =

- GTCA

Personnel
- Captain: Tahjibul Islam
- Owner: Gazi Group

Gazi Tyres Cricket Academy is a Bangladeshi cricket team that has played List A cricket in the Dhaka Premier Division Cricket League (DPL) in the 2023–24 season. In 2022–23 it won the Dhaka First Division Cricket League for first time, earning promotion for the 2023–24 DPL Season. They won three of their 13 matches, finished eleventh, and were relegated back to the First Division.

The team is owned by the Gazi Group of companies, which also owns the DPL teams Gazi Group Cricketers and Rupganj Tigers Cricket Club. Gazi Group established the academy to prepare young cricketers for senior domestic and international cricket. The inaugural List A captain, Tahjibul Islam, was aged 19 when he was appointed.
