= Azmir Ahmed =

Bangladeshi cricketer (born 1995)

Personal information
- Full name: Azmir Ahmed
- Born: 14 November 1995 (age 30); Shantinagar, Dhaka, Bangladesh
- Batting: Right-handed
- Bowling: Right-arm offbreak
- Source: Cricinfo, 25 April 2019

Azmir Ahmed (born 14 November 1995) is a Bangladeshi cricketer. He made his List A debut on 30 March 2017 against Pakistan U-23 in the 2017 ACC Emerging Teams Asia Cup. He made his first-class debut for Dhaka Metropolis in the 2018–19 National Cricket League on 5 November 2018. He made his Twenty20 debut for Legends of Rupganj in the 2018–19 Dhaka Premier Division Twenty20 Cricket League on 27 February 2019.
