= Mahfuzur Rahman Rabby =

Bangladeshi cricketer (born 2005)

Personal information
- Born: 8 May 2005 (age 21); Narayanganj, Bangladesh
- Batting: Left-handed
- Bowling: Slow left arm orthodox
- Role: Bowling all-rounder

Domestic team information
- Years: Team
- 2024-2025: Dhaka Division
- 2024-2025: Khulna Tigers

Career statistics
Competition	FC	LA	T20
Matches	6	39	18
Runs scored	12	511	179
Batting average	1.71	26.89	17.90
100s/50s	0/0	1/0	0/1
Top score	9	125	82*
Balls bowled	903	1511	264
Wickets	13	46	13
Bowling average	28.46	23.73	24.92
5 wickets in innings	0	2	0
10 wickets in match	0	0	0
Best bowling	3/9	5/18	3/11
Catches/stumpings	0/–	16/–	6/–
- Source: ESPNcricinfo, 5 June 2026

Mahfuzur Rahman Rabby (born 8 May 2005) is a Bangladeshi cricketer. A left-handed batsman and slow left arm orthodox bowler, Mahfuzur plays as a bowling allrounder. He made his list A debut for Central Zone Cricket in the 2023–24 BCL 1-Day on 26 December 2023. He made his first-class debut on 26 October 2024 for Dhaka Division in the 2024–25 National Cricket League. He made his Twenty20 debut on 18 October 2024 for Bangladesh A in the 2024 ACC Emerging Teams Asia Cup.

== Early career ==
In January 2024, he was named in Bangladesh's squad for the 2024 Under-19 Cricket World Cup
