= Ariful Islam Jony =

Bangladeshi cricketer (born 1996)

Ariful Islam
Personal information
- Full name: Ariful Islam Jony
- Born: 20 December 1996 (age 29)
- Nickname: Jony
- Batting: Left-handed
- Bowling: Slow left-arm orthodox
- Role: Bowler

Career statistics
Competition	LA
Matches	20
Runs scored	95
Batting average	11.87
100s/50s	0/0
Top score	30
Balls bowled	957
Wickets	17
Bowling average	41.47
5 wickets in innings	0
10 wickets in match	0
Best bowling	3/24
Catches/stumpings	4/–
- Source: ESPNcricinfo, 12 April 2017

Ariful Islam Jony(born 20 December 1996) is a Bangladeshi cricketer. He made his List A debut for Khelaghar Samaj Kallyan Samity in the 2016–17 Dhaka Premier Division Cricket League on 12 April 2017. Prior to his List A debut, he was named in Bangladesh's squad for the 2016 Under-19 Cricket World Cup. In September 2022, he got an opportunity to play in Pakistan Junior League for the team Gujranwala Giants.
