= Ifran Hossain =

Bangladeshi cricketer (born 1996)

Personal information
- Full name: Ifran Hossain
- Born: 4 April 1996 (age 30); Chittagong, Bangladesh
- Batting: Right-handed
- Bowling: Right-arm medium
- Source: Cricinfo, 13 August 2021

Ifran Hossain (born 4 April 1996) is a Bangladeshi cricketer. He made his first-class debut for Chittagong Division in the 2018–19 National Cricket League on 1 October 2018. He made his Twenty20 debut for Khelaghar Samaj Kallyan Samity in the 2018–19 Dhaka Premier Division Twenty20 Cricket League on 25 February 2019. He made his List A debut for Khelaghar Samaj Kallyan Samity in the 2018–19 Dhaka Premier Division Cricket League on 9 March 2019.
