= Shafiqul Islam (cricketer) =

Bangladeshi cricketer (born 1997)

Personal information
- Full name: Shafiqul Islam
- Born: 5 July 1997 (age 29); Bogra, Bangladesh
- Batting: Right-handed
- Bowling: Left-arm medium
- Role: Bowler

Domestic team information
- Years: Team
- 2022: Fortune Barishal
- Source: ESPNcricinfo, 13 August 2021

Shafiqul Islam (born 5 July 1997) is a Bangladeshi cricketer. He made his first-class debut for Rajshahi Division in the 2018–19 National Cricket League on 8 October 2018. He made his List A debut for the Bangladesh A cricket team against Afghanistan A on 24 July 2019. In August 2019, he was one of 35 cricketers named in a training camp ahead of Bangladesh's 2019–20 season. He made his Twenty20 debut on 30 November 2020, for Beximco Dhaka in the 2020–21 Bangabandhu T20 Cup.

In February 2021, he was selected in the Bangladesh Emerging squad for their home series against the Ireland Wolves.
