= Arif Ahmed (cricketer) =

Bangladeshi cricketer

Personal information
- Full name: Arif Ahmed
- Source: ESPNcricinfo, 30 December 2016

Arif Ahmed is a Bangladeshi cricketer. He made his first-class debut for Chittagong Division in the 2001–02 National Cricket League. He scored his maiden first-class century in the 2003–04 National Cricket League.
