= Moinul Islam (cricketer, born 1996) =

Bangladeshi cricketer

Personal information
- Full name: Mohammad Moinul Islam
- Born: 2 December 1996 (age 29); Barguna, Bangladesh
- Source: ESPNcricinfo, 25 September 2016

Moinul Islam (born 2 December 1996) is a Bangladeshi cricketer who plays for Barisal Division. He made his List A debut on 15 March 2022, for City Club against Prime Bank Cricket Club in the 2021–22 Dhaka Premier Division Cricket League.

== See also ==
- List of Barisal Division cricketers
