= Mohammedan Sporting Club cricket team =

List A cricket team in Bangladesh

Mohammedan Sporting Club
Personnel
- Captain: Tawhid Hridoy

Team information
- City: Dhaka

History
- No. of titles: 1

Mohammedan Sporting Club cricket team is a Bangladeshi cricket team that plays List A cricket in the Dhaka Premier League. It is affiliated with the Mohammedan Sporting Club football team. The Dhaka-based Mohammedan Sporting Club also has teams that compete in volleyball, hockey and badminton.

== History ==
Mohammedan Sporting Club cricket team won the Dhaka Premier Division Cricket League title nine times in the years before it became a List A competition, second only to Abahani Limited, who won the title 17 times.

== List A record ==
- 2013–14: 15 matches, won 9, finished fourth
- 2014–15: 16 matches, won 8, finished sixth
- 2015–16: 16 matches, won 8, finished fifth
- 2016–17: 16 matches, won 8, finished fifth
- 2017–18: 11 matches, won 5, tied 1, finished seventh
- 2018–19: 16 matches, won 7, finished sixth
- 2021–22: 10 matches, won 5, finished seventh
- 2022–23: 16 matches, won 8, finished fifth
- 2023–24: 16 matches, won 12, finished second
- 2024–25: 16 matches, won 12, finished second
- 2025–26: 11 matches, won 9, champions

== Twenty20 record ==
- 2013–14: 6 matches, won 3, finished third
- 2018–19: 2 matches, won 1
- 2020–21: 16 matches, won 7, finished sixth

== Captaincy ==
The most notable cricket captains of the club have been Mashrafe Mortaza in 2013–14 and 2014–15, and Imrul Kayes in 2022–23 and 2023–24.

== Records ==
Mohammedan Sporting Club's highest individual score is 190, the competition record at the time, by Raqibul Hasan against Abahani in 2016–17 and the best bowling figures are 6 for 24 by Taijul Islam in 2016–17.
