= Gazi Group Cricketers =

Team that plays List A cricket in Dhaka Premier League

Personnel
- Captain: Anamul Haque
- Owner: Gazi Group

History
- No. of titles: 1

Gazi Group Cricketers are a team that plays List A cricket in the Dhaka Premier League. They are sponsored by the Gazi Group of industrial companies, which also sponsors the DPL teams Gazi Tyres Cricket Academy and Rupganj Tigers Cricket Club. Under their former name of Magnum Cricketers they won the Dhaka First Division League in 2014–15, and were promoted to List A status in the Dhaka Premier League for 2015–16. They won the 2016–17 edition of the competition.

== List A record ==
- 2015–16: 11 matches, won 5, finished eighth
- 2016–17: 16 matches, won 12, champions
- 2017–18: 16 matches, won 7, finished sixth
- 2018–19: 11 matches, won 5, finished eighth
- 2021–22: 15 matches, won 6, finished sixth
- 2022–23: 16 matches, won 7, finished sixth
- 2023–24: 16 matches, won 8, finished sixth
- 2024–25: 16 matches, won 10, finished third
- 2025–26: 11 matches, won 4, finished ninth

Nasir Hossain captained the team when they won the championship in 2016–17. In 2022–23 the captain was Akbar Ali, and in 2023–24 it was Mehedi Maruf.

== Records ==
Gazi Group Cricketers' highest score is 152 by Mominul Haque in 2016–17, and the best bowling figures are 8 for 40 (the competition record) by Yeasin Arafat in 2017–18.
