= 2024–25 Dhaka Premier Division Cricket League =

Cricket tournament

- Dates: 3 March 2025 – 29 April 2025
- Administrator: Bangladesh Cricket Board
- Cricket format: List A
- Tournament format: Round-robin
- Champions: Abahani Limited
- Runners-up: Mohammedan Sporting Club
- Participants: 12
- Matches: 84
- Most runs: Anamul Haque 874
- Most wickets: Mosaddek Hossain 30; Rakibul Hasan 30

The 2024–25 Dhaka Premier Division Cricket League (DPDCL) was the 11th edition of the Dhaka Premier Division Cricket League, a List A cricket competition in Bangladesh. It was contested by 12 club teams. The tournament started on 3 March 2025. Player signings took place on 22 and 23 February 2025. The first eight rounds and the last three rounds of the tournament were separated by a break of two weeks for the observance of Eid.

Abahani Limited were the defending champions. Gulshan Cricket Club and Agrani Bank Cricket Club were promoted to this tournament after achieving the top two places in the 2023–24 Dhaka First Division Cricket League, replacing Gazi Tyres Cricket Academy and City Club, who were relegated after the previous tournament.

The 2024–25 tournament's official name was the "Bashundhara Dhaka Premier Division Cricket League 2024-25", after the main sponsors, Bashundhara Group.

== Teams and format ==
The competition was in round-robin format, followed by play-offs among the top six teams for the championship and among the lowest three teams to determine relegation. The competing teams were:

- Abahani Limited
- Agrani Bank Cricket Club
- Brothers Union
- Dhanmondi Sports Club
- Gazi Group Cricketers
- Gulshan Cricket Club
- Legends of Rupganj
- Mohammedan Sporting Club
- Partex Sporting Club
- Prime Bank Cricket Club
- Rupganj Tigers Cricket Club
- Shinepukur Cricket Club

== Venues ==
Mirpur Dhaka	Savar Dhaka	Savar Dhaka
Sher-e-Bangla National Cricket Stadium	BKSP 3 No. Ground	BKSP 4 No. Ground
Capacity: 26,000	Capacity:	Capacity:
Matches: 38	Matches: 35	Matches: 35

== Points table ==
=== League points table ===
Pos	Team	Pld	W	L	T	NR	Pts	NRR	Qualification
1	Abahani Limited	11	9	2	0	0	18	1.468	Advance to Super League
2	Mohammedan Sporting Club	11	9	2	0	0	18	0.771	Advance to Super League
3	Gazi Group Cricketers	11	8	3	0	0	16	0.962	Advance to Super League
4	Gulshan Cricket Club	11	7	3	0	1	15	0.171	Advance to Super League
5	Agrani Bank Cricket Club	11	7	4	0	0	14	0.256	Advance to Super League
6	Legends of Rupganj	11	6	4	0	1	13	1.455	Advance to Super League
7	Prime Bank Cricket Club	11	5	6	0	0	10	−0.081	
8	Dhanmondi Sports Club	11	4	7	0	0	8	−0.446	
9	Rupganj Tigers Cricket Club	11	3	7	0	1	7	−0.615	
10	Partex Sporting Club	11	3	8	0	0	6	−1.305	Advance to Relegation League
11	Brothers Union	11	2	8	0	1	5	−0.823	Advance to Relegation League
12	Shinepukur Cricket Club	11	1	10	0	0	2	−1.661	Advance to Relegation League

Source: ESPNCricinfo
Cricheroes

Teams qualified for the Super League phase of the tournament.

Teams qualified for the Relegation League play-offs phase of the tournament.

***when two teams are tied on points, head-to-head winner is placed above on the table

=== Super League ===
Pos	Team	Pld	W	L	T	NR	Pts	NRR
1	Abahani Limited (C)	16	14	2	0	0	28	1.308
2	Mohammedan Sporting Club	16	12	4	0	0	24	0.500
3	Gazi Group Cricketers	16	10	6	0	0	20	0.704
4	Legends of Rupganj	16	9	6	0	1	19	1.222
5	Gulshan Cricket Club	16	8	7	0	1	17	−0.227
6	Agrani Bank Cricket Club	16	8	8	0	0	16	0.132

Source: ESPNCricinfo
Cricheroes

Team will be declared as Champion of the tournament.

***when two teams are tied on points, head-to-head winner is placed above on the table

=== Relegation League ===
Pos	Team	Pld	W	L	T	NR	Pts	NRR
1	Brothers Union	13	4	8	0	1	9	−0.466
2	Partex Sporting Club	13	4	9	0	0	8	−1.252
3	Shinepukur Cricket Club	13	1	12	0	0	2	−1.505

Source: ESPNCricinfo
Cricheroes

***when two teams are tied on points, head-to-head winner is placed above on the table

== Match summary ==
Below is a summary of results for each team's nine regular season matches in chronological order. A team's opponent for any given match is listed above the margin of victory/defeat.

Team	League Stage											Super League					
Team	1	2	3	4	5	6	7	8	9	10	11	1	2	3	4	5	Pos
Abahani Limited (ABL)	ABCC; 6 wickets	162 runs	RTCC; 4 wickets	PSC; 8 wickets	BU; 80 runs	LoR; 4 wickets	GGC; 2 wickets	DSC; 5 wickets	SCC; 10 wickets	PBCC; 133 runs	MSC; 39 runs	ABCC; 4 wickets	GCC; 50 runs	GGC; 10 runs	TBD ?	TBD ?	-
Agrani Bank Cricket Club (ABCC)	ABL; 6 wickets	GGC; 4 wickets	GCC; 6 wickets	DSC; 5 wickets	RTCC; 7 wickets	SCC; 46 runs	PSC; 1 wickets	PBCC; 34 runs	BU; 4 wickets	MSC; 74 runs	LoR; 89 runs	ABL; 4 wickets	MSC; 7 wickets	LoR; 103 runs	TBD ?	TBD ?	-
Dhanmondi Sports Club (DSC)	BU; 4 wickets	LoR; 24 runs	GGC; 175 runs	ABCC; 5 wickets	SCC; 97 runs	PBCC; 55 runs	MSC; 23 runs	ABL; 5 wickets	GCC; 2 wickets	RTCC; 5 wickets	PSC; 2 wickets	×					8th
Gazi Group Cricketers (GGC)	LoR; 10 wickets	ABCC; 4 wickets	DSC; 175 runs	SCC; 8 wickets	PBCC; 94 runs	MSC; 65 runs	ABL; 2 wickets	GCC; 4 wickets	RTCC; 8 wickets	PSC; 170 runs	BU; 51 runs	GCC; 3 wickets	LoR; 7 wickets	ABL; 10 runs	TBD ?	TBD ?	-
Gulshan Cricket Club (GCC)	MSC; 107 runs	ABL; 162 runs	ABCC; 6 wickets	RTCC; 6 wickets	PSC; 57 runs	BU; 2 wickets	LoR; Abandoned	GGC; 4 wickets	DSC; 2 wickets	SCC; 5 runs	PBCC; 5 wickets	GGC; 3 wickets	ABL; 50 runs	MSC; 5 wickets	TBD ?	TBD ?	-
Legends of Rupganj (LoR)	GGC; 10 wickets	DSC; 24 runs	SCC; 10 wickets	PBCC; 8 wickets	MSC; 94 runs	ABL; 4 wickets	GCC; Abandoned	RTCC; 172 runs	PSC; 10 wickets	BU; 10 runs	ABCC; 89 runs	MSC; 9 wickets	GGC; 7 wickets	ABCC; 103 runs	TBD ?	TBD ?	-
Mohammedan SC (MSC)	GCC; 107 runs	RTCC; 7 wickets	PSC; 7 wickets	BU; 9 wickets	LoR; 94 runs	GGC; 65 runs	DSC; 23 runs	SCC; 7 wickets	PBCC; 5 wickets	ABCC; 74 runs	ABL; 39 runs	LoR; 9 wickets	ABCC; 7 wickets	GCC; 5 wickets	TBD ?	TBD ?	-
Prime Bank Cricket Club (PBCC)	RTCC; 5 wickets	PSC; 3 wickets	BU; 173 runs	LoR; 8 wickets	GGC; 94 runs	DSC; 55 runs	SCC; 9 wickets	ABCC; 34 runs	MSC; 5 wickets	ABL; 133 runs	GCC; 5 wickets	×					7th
Rupganj Tigers Cricket Club (RTCC)	PBCC; 5 wickets	MSC; 7 wickets	ABL; 4 wickets	GCC; 6 wickets	ABCC; 7 wickets	PSC; 4 wickets	BU; Abandoned	LoR; 172 runs	GGC; 8 wickets	DSC; 5 wickets	SCC; 28 runs	×					9th
												Relegation League					
Brothers Union (BU)	DSC; 4 wickets	SCC; 7 wickets	PBCC; 173 runs	MSC; 9 wickets	ABL; 80 runs	GCC; 2 wickets	RTCC; Abandoned	PSC; 29 runs	ABCC; 4 wickets	LoR; 10 runs	GGC; 51 runs	SCC; 6 wickets	PSC; 113 runs	×			10
Partex Sporting Club (PSC)	SCC; 77 runs	PBCC; 3 wickets	MSC; 7 wickets	ABL; 8 wickets	GCC; 57 runs	RTCC; 4 wickets	ABCC; 1 wickets	BU; 29 runs	LoR; 10 wickets	GGC; 170 runs	DSC; 2 wickets	SCC; 19 runs	BU; 113 runs	×			11
Shinepukur Cricket Club (SCC)	PSC; 77 runs	BU; 7 wickets	LoR; 10 wickets	GGC; 8 wickets	DSC; 97 runs	ABCC; 46 runs	PBCC; 9 wickets	MSC; 7 wickets	ABL; 10 wickets	GCC; 5 runs	RTCC; 28 runs	PSC; 19 runs	BU; 6 wickets	×			12

Team's results→	TBA	Tied	Lost	N/R

== League stage ==
=== Round 1 ===
Match 1
3 March 2025
9:00 am
Scorecard

Abahani Limited; 234 (50 overs)	v	Agrani Bank Cricket Club; 235/4 (45)
Mosaddek Hossain 73 (65; Shohidul Islam 4/44 (10 overs)		Imrul Kayes 94 (94); Mahfuzur Rahman Rabby 2/41 (6 overs)

Agrani Bank Cricket Club won by 6 wickets
Sher-e-Bangla National Cricket Stadium, Dhaka
Umpires: Gazi Sohel and Sajedul Islam
Player of the match: Imrul Kayes (Agrani Bank Cricket Club)

- Agrani Bank Cricket Club won the toss and elected to field first

Match 2
3 March 2025
9:00 am
Scorecard

Gulshan Cricket Club; 298/8 (50)	v	Mohammedan Sporting Club; 191 (40.2)
Iftakhar Hossain Ifti 108 (110); Abu Hider 4/66 (10 overs)		Ariful Islam 73 (79); Iftakhar Hossain Ifti 3/32 (7 overs)

Gulshan Cricket Club won by 107 runs
BKSP Cricket Ground 3, Savar
Umpires: Morshed Ali Khan and Mozahiduzzaman
Player of the match: Iftakhar Hossain Ifti (Gulshan Cricket Club)

- Mohammedan Sporting Club won the toss and elected to field first

Match 3
3 March 2025
9:00 am
Scorecard

Rupganj Tigers Cricket Club; 216 (48.4 overs)	v	Prime Bank Cricket Club; 220/7 (32.4 overs)
Abdul Mazid 53 (73); Nahidul Islam 3/37 (9)		Shamim Hossain 98* (83); Husna Habib 2/39 (6 overs)

Prime Bank Cricket Club won by 3 wickets
BKSP Cricket Ground 4, Savar
Umpires: Moniruzzaman and Ishtiaq Ahmed
Player of the match: Shamim Hossain (Prime Bank Cricket Club)

- Prime Bank Cricket Club won the toss and elected to field first

Match 4
4 March 2025
9:00 am
Scorecard

Shinepukur Cricket Club; 298/5 (50)	v	Partex Sporting Club; 221 (49.5)
Rayan Rahman 87 (81); Shahidul Islam 1/43 (10 overs)		Jawad Mohammad 46 (67); Rafiuzzaman Rafi 3/14 (10 overs)

Shinepukur Cricket Club won by 77 runs
BKSP Cricket Ground 4, Savar
Umpires: Ali Arman and Gazi Sohel
Player of the match: Rafiuzzaman Rafi (Shinepukur Cricket Club)

- Partex Sporting Club won the toss and elected to field first
- Anik Sarker Shatu, Md Rafi Uzzaman Rafi, Moinul Islam Tonmoy, Rahim Ahmed, Zubaer Hossain made their List A cricket debut.

Match 5
4 March 2025
9:00 am
Scorecard

Brothers Union; 262/5 (50.0 overs)	v	Dhanmondi Cricket Club; 264/6 (48.4 overs)
Mahfijul Islam Robin 84 (111); Kamrul Islam Rabbi 2/54 (10 overs)		Nurul Hasan* 58 (53); Yeasin Arafat Meshu 3/43 (10 overs)

Dhanmondi Sports Club won by 4 wickets
Sher-e-Bangla National Cricket Stadium, Dhaka
Umpires: Mozahiduzzaman and Amit Majumdar
Player of the match: Nurul Hasan (Dhanmondi Sports Club)

- Dhanmondi Sports Club won the toss and elected to field first

Match 6
4 March 2025
9:00 am
Scorecard

Gazi Group Cricketers; 93 (38.5)	v	Legends of Rupganj; 97/0 (13.5 overs)
Abdul Gaffar Saqlain 26 (50); Shoriful Islam 4/14 (10 overs)		Tanzid Hasan 65* (46)

Legends of Rupganj won by 10 wickets
BKSP Cricket Ground 3, Savar
Umpires: Kamruzzaman Limon and Morshed Ali Khan
Player of the match: Shoriful Islam (Legends of Rupganj)

- Legends of Rupganj won the toss and elected to field first

=== Round 2 ===
Match 7
6 March 2025
9:00 am
Scorecard

Abahani Limited cricket team 323/6 (50 overs)	v	Gulshan Cricket Club; 161/9 (29.4 overs)
Parvez Hossain Emon 126 (124); Asaduzzaman Payel 3/65 (10 overs)		Khalid Hasan 49 (54); Rakibul Hasan 4/40 (5.4 overs)

Abahani Limited won by 162 runs
BKSP Cricket Ground 4, Savar
Umpires: Moniruzzaman and Kamruzzaman Limon
Player of the match: Parvez Hossain Emon (Abahani Limited)

- Gulshan Cricket Club won the toss and elected to field

Match 8
6 March 2025
9:00 am
Scorecard

Rupganj Tigers Cricket Club; 222/9 (50 overs)	v	Mohammedan Sporting Club; 225/3 (37.5 overs)
Al-Amin 41 (51); Taijul Islam 2/29 (10 overs)		Mahidul Islam Ankon 81* (97); Enamul Hoque Ashiq 1/39 (7 overs)

Mohammedan Sporting Club won by 7 wickets
Sher-e-Bangla National Cricket Stadium, Dhaka
Umpires: Gazi Sohel and Shafeen Shareef
Player of the match: Mahidul Islam Ankon (Mohammedan Sporting Club)

- Mohammedan Sporting Club won the toss and elected to field

Match 9
6 March 2025
9:00 am
Scorecard

Prime Bank Cricket Club; 299/8 (50)	v	Partex Sporting Club; 303/7 (48 overs)
Shamim Hossain 69 (60); Mohor Sheikh 2/60 (10 overs)		Alauddin Babu 78* (32); Arafat Sunny 2/50 (9 overs)

Partex Sporting Club won by 3 wickets
BKSP Cricket Ground 3, Savar
Umpires: Mozahiduzzaman and Shyful Islam Jewel
Player of the match: Alauddin Babu (Partex Sporting Club)

- Prime Bank Cricket Club won the toss and elected to bat

Match 10
7 March 2025
9:00 am
Scorecard

Shinepukur Cricket Club; 288/9 (50 overs)	v	Brothers Union; 292/3 (48.5 overs)
Rahim Ahmed 95 (96); Al-Amin Hossain 5/50 (10 overs)		Mizanur Rahman 136* (129); Rahim Ahmed 2/43 (5.5 overs)

Brothers Union won by 7 wickets
BKSP Cricket Ground 4, Savar
Umpires: Barkatulylah Turke and Habibur Rahman
Player of the match: Mizanur Rahman (Brothers Union)

- Brothers Union won the toss and elected to field

Match 11
7 March 2025
9:00 am
Scorecard

Legends of Rupganj; 332/7 (50 overs)	v	Dhanmondi Cricket Club; 308/9 (50 overs)
Yasir Ali 143* (121); Tanvir Islam 3/50 (10 overs)		Afif Hossain 98 (96); Moin Khan 3/40 (10 overs)

won by 24 runs
BKSP Cricket Ground 3, Savar
Umpires: Ali Arman and Nazmul Hasan
Player of the match: Yasir Ali (Dhanmondi Cricket Club)

- Legends of Rupganj won the toss and elected to field

Match 12
7 March 2025
9:00 am
Scorecard

Agrani Bank Cricket Club; 216 (46.2 overs)	v	Gazi Group Cricketers; 220/6 (47.4 overs)
Amite Hasan 89 (111); Abdul Gaffar Saqlain 3/35 (6.2 overs)		Sadikur Rahman 89 (96); Robiul Hoque 2/33 (8.2 overs)

Gazi Group Cricketers won by 4 wickets
Sher-e-Bangla National Cricket Stadium, Dhaka
Umpires: Moniruzzaman and Rakibul Islam
Player of the match: Tofael Ahmed (Gazi Group Cricketers)

- Gazi Group Cricketers won the toss and elected to field

=== Round 3 ===
Match 13
9 March 2025
9:00 am
Scorecard

Abahani Limited; 260 (49.4 overs)	v	Rupganj Tigers Cricket Club; 264/6 (47.3 overs)
Al-Amin 104 (89); Rakibul Hasan 3/43 (10 overs)		Mohammad Mithun 60 (61); Faysal Ahmed 2/45 (10 overs)

Abahani Limited won by 4 wickets
BKSP Cricket Ground 3, Savar
Umpires: Ali Arman and Morshed Ali Khan
Player of the match: Al-Amin (Rupganj Tigers Cricket Club)

- Abahani Limited won the toss and elected to field first

Match 14
9 March 2025
9:00 am
Scorecard

Partex Sporting Club; 218 (46.3 overs)	v	Mohammedan Sporting Club; 222/3 (40.2 overs)
Ahrar Amin 78 (86); Taijul Islam 4/50 (9.3 overs)		Tamim Iqbal 125* (112); Jawad Mohammad 1/25 (9 overs)

Mohammedan Sporting Club won by 7 wickets
BKSP Cricket Ground 4, Savar
Umpires: Moniruzzaman and Sajedul Islam
Player of the match: Tamim Iqbal (Mohammedan Sporting Club)

- Partex Sporting Club won the toss and elected to bat first

Match 15
9 March 2025
9:00 am
Scorecard

Prime Bank Cricket Club; 422/8 (50)	v	Brothers Union; 249 (42.3 overs)
Mohammad Naim 176 (125); Al-Amin Hossain 3/77 (10 overs)		Aich Mollah 96 (110); Rishad Hossain 3/66 (10 overs)

Prime Bank Cricket Club won by 173 runs
Sher-e-Bangla National Cricket Stadium, Dhaka
Umpires: ATM Ikram and Masudur Rahman
Player of the match: Mohammad Naim (Prime Bank Cricket Club)

- Brothers Union won the toss and elected to field first

Match 16
10 March 2025
9:00 am
Scorecard

Legends of Rupganj; 69 (25.5 overs)	v	Shinepukur Cricket Club; 75/0 (9.3 overs)
Moinul Islam Tonmoy 18 (26); Tanvir Islam 3/15 (7 overs)		Saif Hassan 39* (37)

Legends of Rupganj won by 10 wickets
Sher-e-Bangla National Cricket Stadium, Dhaka
Umpires: Kamruzzaman Limon and Mahfuzur Rahman
Player of the match: Tanvir Islam (Legends of Rupganj)

- Legends of Rupganj won the toss and elected to field first

Match 17
10 March 2025
9:00 am
Scorecard

Dhanmondi Cricket Club; 298/7 (50 overs)	v	Gazi Group Cricketers; 123 (34.2 overs)
Anamul Haque 69 (94); Sunzamul Islam 4/51 (10 overs)		Nurul Hasan 33 (33); Wasi Siddiquee 3/29 (7.2 overs)

Gazi Group Cricketers won by 175 runs
BKSP Cricket Ground 4, Savar
Umpires: Barkatulylah Turkey and Gazi Sohel
Player of the match: Abdul Gaffar Saqlain (Gazi Group Cricketers)

- Dhanmondi Sports Club won the toss and elected to field first

Match 18
10 March 2025
9:00 am
Scorecard

Gulshan Cricket Club; 222 (49 overs)	v	Agrani Bank Cricket Club; 226/4 (49 overs)
Litton Das 60 (62); Arif Ahmed 3/28 (9 overs)		Imranuzzaman 75 (98); Mehedi Hasan 2/40 (9 overs)

Agrani Bank Cricket Club won by 6 wickets
BKSP Cricket Ground 3, Savar
Umpires: Imran Parvez and Sohrab Hossain
Player of the match: Imranuzzaman (Agrani Bank Cricket Club)

- Gulshan Cricket Club won the toss and elected to bat first

=== Round 4 ===
Match 19
12 March 2025
9:00 am
Scorecard

Partex Sporting Club; 100 (33.1 overs)	v	Abahani Limited; 101/2 (14.3 overs)
Joyraz Sheik 36 (59); Mahfuzur Rahman Rabby 5/18 (9 overs)		Parvez Hossain Emon 55* (50); Tanvir Hossain 2/51 (6 overs)

Abahani Limited won by 8 wickets
Sher-e-Bangla National Cricket Stadium, Dhaka
Umpires: Masudur Rahman Mukul and Barkatullah Turkey
Player of the match: Mahfuzur Rahman Rabby (Abahani Limited)

- Abahani Limited won the toss and elected to field

Match 20
12 March 2025
9:00 am
Scorecard

Brothers Union; 187 (48.4 overs)	v	Mohammedan Sporting Club; 191/1 32.5)
Imtiaz Hossain 43 (59); Taijul Islam 4/31 (10 overs)		Tamim Iqbal 105* (96); Al-Amin Hossain 1/23 (4 overs)

Mohammedan Sporting Club won by 9 wickets
BKSP Cricket Ground 3, Savar
Umpires: Asadur Rahman and Nazmul Hasan
Player of the match: Tamim Iqbal (Mohammedan Sporting Club)

- Mohammedan Sporting Club won the toss and elected to field

Match 21
12 March 2025
9:00 am
Scorecard

Prime Bank Cricket Club; 152 (29.5 overs)	v	Legends of Rupganj; 154/2 (23.2 overs)
Mohammad Naim 81 (83); Saif Hassan 4/37 (10 overs)		Tanzid Hasan 68 (49); Nahidul Islam 1/37 (10 overs)

Legends of Rupganj won by 8 wickets
BKSP Cricket Ground 4, Savar
Umpires: Amit Mojumder and Mahfuzur Rahman
Player of the match: Saif Hassan (Legends of Rupganj)

- Legends of Rupganj won the toss and elected to field

Match 22
13 March 2025
9:00 am
Scorecard

Shinepukur Cricket Club; 161 (45.2 overs)	v	Gazi Group Cricketers; 162/2 (17.5 overs)
Zubaer Hossain 46 (59); Shamim Mia 3/22 (9 overs)		Anamul Haque 52 (27); RafiUzzaman Rafi 1/42 (6 overs)

Gazi Group Cricketers won by 8 wickets
BKSP Cricket Ground 3, Savar
Umpires: Habibur Rahman and Mozahiduzzaman
Player of the match: Shamim Mia (Gazi Group Cricketers)

- Gazi Group Cricketers won the toss and elected to field first

Match 23
13 March 2025
9:00 am
Scorecard

Dhanmondi Cricket Club; 115 (33.5)	v	Agrani Bank Cricket Club; 120/5 (38.5 overs)
Moin Khan 35 (40); Robiul Hoque 4/14 (5.5 overs)		Marshall Ayub 51* (92); Hasan Murad 2/30 (10)

Agrani Bank Cricket Club won by 5 wickets
BKSP Cricket Ground 4, Savar
Umpires: Moniruzzaman and Shafiuddin Ahmed
Player of the match: Robiul Hoque (Agrani Bank Cricket Club)

- Agrani Bank Cricket Club won the toss and elected to field first

Match 24
13 March 2025
9:00 am
Scorecard

Rupganj Tigers Cricket Club; 228/9 (50 overs)	v	Gulshan Cricket Club; 232/4 (46.5 overs)
Amit Majumder 88 (108); Asaduzzaman Payel 4/53 (10 overs)		Zawad Abrar 67 (75); Mahmudul Hasan 3/47 (9)

Gulshan Cricket Club won by 6 wickets
Sher-e-Bangla National Cricket Stadium, Dhaka
Umpires: Gazi Sohel and Ishtiaq Ahmed
Player of the match: Asaduzzaman Payel (Gulshan Cricket Club)

- Gulshan Cricket Club won the toss and elected to field first

=== Round 5 ===
Match 25
15 March 2025
09:30
Scorecard

Abahani Limited; 310/8 (50 overs)	v	Brothers Union; 230/7 (50 overs)
Mominul Haque 92 (74); Al-Amin Hossain 2/41 (10 overs)		Myshukur Rahaman 84 (78); Mosaddek Hossain 2/12 (7 overs)

Abahani Limited won by 80 runs
BKSP Cricket Ground 3, Savar
Umpires: Morshed Ali Khan and Nazmul Hasan
Player of the match: Mominul Haque(Abahani Limited)

- Brothers Union won the toss and elected to field first

Match 26
15 March 2025
09:30
Scorecard

Mohammedan Sporting Club; 253/9 (50 overs)	v	Legends of Rupganj; 159 (37.2 overs)
Towhid Hridoy 66 (76); Shoriful Islam 4/54 (10 overs)		Mahedi Hasan 43 (49); Mehidy Hasan Miraz 4/38 (9.2)

Mohammedan Sporting Club won by 94 runs
Sher-e-Bangla National Cricket Stadium, Dhaka
Umpires: Gazi Sohel and Sharfuddoula
Player of the match: Mehidy Hasan Miraz (Mohammedan Sporting Club)

- Legends of Rupganj won the toss and elected to field first

Match 27
15 March 2025
09:30
Scorecard

Gazi Group Cricketers; 183 (43.4 overs)	v	Prime Bank Cricket Club; 89 (23.2 overs)
Anamul Haque 48 (44); Arafat Sunny 3/22 (9 overs)		Rishad Hossain 21 (22); Abu Hasim 3/12 (4.2)

Gazi Group Cricketers won by 94 runs
BKSP Cricket Ground 3, Savar
Umpires: Imran Parvez and Mahfuzur Rahman
Player of the match: Abu Hasim (Gazi Group Cricketers)

- Prime Bank Cricket Club won the toss and elected to field first

Match 28
16 March 2025
9:00 am
Scorecard

Dhanmondi Cricket Club; 277/9 (50 overs)	v	Shinepukur Cricket Club; 180 (45.3 overs)
Nurul Hasan Sohan 132* (131); Rayan Rahman 3/45 (10 overs)		Rahim Ahmed 42 (70); Sunzamul Islam 4/49 (10 overs)

Dhanmondi Sports Club won by 97 runs
BKSP Cricket Ground 3, Savar
Umpires: Masudur Rahman and Shahin Al Asad
Player of the match: Nurul Hasan Sohan (Dhanmondi Sports Club)

- Dhanmondi Sports Club won the toss and elected to bat first

Match 29
16 March 2025
9:00 am
Scorecard

Gulshan Cricket Club; 221/9 (50 overs)	v	Partex Sporting Club; 164 (43.2 overs)
Azizul Hakim Tamim 62 (79); Taufiq Ahmed 3/56 (10)		Robiul Islam Robi 30 (38); Nihaduzzaman 2/35 (9 overs)

Gulshan Cricket Club won by 57 runs
Sher-e-Bangla National Cricket Stadium, Dhaka
Umpires: Mahfuzur Rahman and Ali Arman
Player of the match: Azizul Hakim Tamim (Gulshan Cricket Club)

- Partex Sporting Club won the toss and elected to field first

Match 30
16 March 2025
9:00 am
Scorecard

Rupganj Tigers Cricket Club; 260 (50 overs)	v	Agrani Bank Cricket Club; 261/3 (44.5 overs)
Amit Majumder 81 (109); Taibur Rahman 3/41 (9 overs)		Shadman Islam 115* (109); Mahmudul Hasan 2/50 (9 overs)

Agrani Bank Cricket Club won by 7 wickets
BKSP Cricket Ground 4, Savar
Umpires: Manjurul Islam and Sajedul Islam
Player of the match: Shadman Islam (Agrani Bank Cricket Club)

- Agrani Bank Cricket Club won the toss and elected to field first

=== Round 6 ===
Match 31
18 March 2025
09:30
Scorecard

Legends of Rupganj; 292/6 (50 overs)	v	Abahani Limited; 293/6 (48.4 overs)
Saif Hassan 67 (103); Mosaddek Hossain 2/57 (9 overs)		Najmul Hossain Shanto 101 (108); Mahedi Hasan 2/53 (10 overs)

Abahani Limited won by 4 wickets
BKSP Cricket Ground 3, Savar
Umpires: Masudur Rahman and Muhammad Kamruzzaman
Player of the match: Najmul Hossain Shanto (Abahani Limited)

- Abahani Limited won the toss and elected to field first

Match 32
18 March 2025
09:30
Scorecard

Gazi Group Cricketers; 336/5 (50 overs)	v	Mohammedan Sporting Club; 271 (48.1 overs)
Anamul Haque 149* (143); Taskin Ahmed 3/107 (10 overs)		Rony Talukdar 74 (90); Abdul Gaffar Saqlain 4/59 (9 overs)

Gazi Group Cricketers won by 65 runs
BKSP Cricket Ground 4, Savar
Umpires: Sharfuddoula and Kamruzzaman Limon
Player of the match: Anamul Haque (Gazi Group Cricketers)

- Mohammedan Sporting Club won the toss and elected to field first

Match 33
18 March 2025
09:30
Scorecard

Prime Bank Cricket Club; 308/5 (50 overs)	v	Dhanmondi Cricket Club; 253 (49.5 overs)
Zakir Hasan 64 (86); Moin Khan 3/46 (10 overs)		Fazle Mahmud 79 (104); Hasan Mahmud 3/38 (10 overs)

Prime Bank Cricket Club won by 55 runs
Sher-e-Bangla National Cricket Stadium, Dhaka
Umpires: Mahfuzur Rahman and Sajedul Islam
Player of the match: Shamim Hossain (Prime Bank Cricket Club)

- Dhanmondi Sports Club won the toss and elected to field first

Match 34
19 March 2025
09:30
Scorecard

Agrani Bank Cricket Club; 294/7 (50 overs)	v	Shinepukur Cricket Club; 248/5 (50 overs)
Imrul Kayes 86 (85); Rayan Rahman 2/49 (10 overs)		Rayan Rahman 106* (130); Nayeem Hasan 2/34 (10 overs)

Agrani Bank Cricket Club won by 46 runs
BKSP Cricket Ground 4, Savar
Umpires: Joynal Abedin and Moniruzzaman
Player of the match: Imrul Kayes (Agrani Bank Cricket Club)

- Agrani Bank Cricket Club won the toss and elected to bat first

Match 35
19 March 2025
09:30
Scorecard

Partex Sporting Club; 223 (49.5 overs)	v	Rupganj Tigers Cricket Club; 225/6 (50 overs)
Joyraz Sheik 54 (71); Mahmudul Hasan 3/46 (10 overs)		Abdul Mazid 100* (123); Ahrar Amin 2/32 (7 overs)

Rupganj Tigers Cricket Club won by 4 wickets
BKSP Cricket Ground 3, Savar
Umpires: Imran Parvez and Mozahiduzzaman
Player of the match: Abdul Mazid (Rupganj Tigers Cricket Club)

- Partex Sporting Club won the toss and elected to bat first

Match 36
19 March 2025
09:30
Scorecard

Brothers Union; 290/9 (50 overs)	v	Gulshan Cricket Club; 294/8 (48.3 overs)
Bishal Chowdhury 83 (75); Nihaduzzaman 3/40 (9 overs)		Elias Sunny 53 (62); Sohag Gazi 4/44 (10 overs)

Gulshan Cricket Club won by 2 wickets
Sher-e-Bangla National Cricket Stadium, Dhaka
Umpires: ATM Ikram and Gazi Sohel
Player of the match: Farhad Reza (Gulshan Cricket Club)

- Gulshan Cricket Club won the toss and elected to field first

=== Round 7 ===
Match 37
21 March 2025
09:30
Scorecard

Gazi Group Cricketers; 199 (35.1 overs)	v	Abahani Limited; 200/8 (35 overs)
Anamul Haque 68 (76); Mominul Haque 4/38 (6.1 overs)		Mohammad Mithun 76 (77); Sheikh Parvez Jibon 3/46 (8 overs)

Abahani Limited won by 2 wickets
BKSP Cricket Ground 4, Savar
Umpires: Gazi Sohel and Shyful Islam
Player of the match: Mominul Haque (Abahani Limited)

- Abahani Limited won the toss and elected to field first

Match 38
21 March 2025
09:30
Scorecard

Mohammedan Sporting Club; 216/6 (50 overs)	v	Dhanmondi Sports Club; 193 (43.3 overs)
Towhid Hridoy 53* (47); Kamrul Islam Rabbi 3/54 (10 overs)		Nurul Hasan 100 (93); Mohammad Saifuddin 3/34 (4.3 overs)

Mohammedan Sporting Club won by 23 runs
Sher-e-Bangla National Cricket Stadium, Dhaka
Umpires: Joynal Abedin and Masudur Rahman
Player of the match: Nurul Hasan (Dhanmondi Sports Club)

- Dhanmondi Sports Club won the toss and elected to field first

Match 39
21 March 2025
09:30
Scorecard

Shinepukur Cricket Club; 159 (48.4 overs)	v	Prime Bank Cricket Club; 162/1 (20.1 overs)
Farjan Ahamed 38 (68); Shafiul Islam 3/21 (9.4 overs)		104* (64); Shahin Alam 1/45 (5 overs)

Prime Bank Cricket Club
BKSP Cricket Ground 3, Savar
Umpires: Mohammad Shihab and Moniruzzaman
Player of the match: Mohammad Naim (Prime Bank Cricket Club)

- Prime Bank Cricket Club won the toss and elected to field first

Match 40
22 March 2025
09:30
Scorecard

Legends of Rupganj	v	Gulshan Cricket Club

Abandoned (Match abandoned due to badlight)
BKSP Cricket Ground 4, Savar
Umpires: Morshed Ali Khan and ATM Ikram

Match 41
22 March 2025
09:30
Scorecard

Brothers Union	v	Rupganj Tigers Cricket Club

Abandoned (match abandoned due to rain)
BKSP Cricket Ground 3, Savar
Umpires: Mahfuzur Rahman and Ali Arman

Match 42
22 March 2025
09:30
Scorecard

Partex Sporting Club; 218 (50.0 overs)	v	Agrani Bank Cricket Club; 219/9 (50 overs)
Marshall Ayub 64 (87); Naeem Islam 3/41 (10 overs)		Md Rakib 80* (103); Asadur Rahman 2/29 (10 overs)

Partex Sporting Club won by 1 wickets
Sher-e-Bangla National Cricket Stadium, Dhaka
Umpires: Asadur Rahman and Sajedul Islam
Player of the match: Md Rakib (Partex Sporting Club)

- Partex Sporting Club won the toss and elected to field first

=== Round 8 ===
Match 43
24 March 2025
09:30
Scorecard

Dhanmondi Cricket Club; 201/9 (50 overs)	v	Abahani Limited; 206/5 (39.2 overs)
Fazle Mahmud 87 (126); Rakibul Hasan 4/16 (10 overs)		Parvez Hossain Emon 124* (133); Mohammad Enamul 4/40 (10 overs)

Abahani Limited won by 5 wickets
Sher-e-Bangla National Cricket Stadium, Dhaka
Umpires: Sajidul Islam and Sharfuddoula
Player of the match: Parvez Hossain Emon (Abahani Limited)

- Abahani Limited won the toss and elected to field.

Match 44
24 March 2025
09:30
Scorecard

Shinepukur Cricket Club; 223 (49.5 overs)	v	Mohammedan Sporting Club; 227/3 (42.2 overs)
Rayan Rahman 77 (107); Taijul Islam 3/44 (9 overs)		Mehidy Hasan Miraz 103 (86); Rahim Ahmed 2/22 (7 overs)

Mohammedan Sporting Club won by 7 wickets
BKSP Cricket Ground 3, Savar
Umpires: Mozahiduzzaman and Rakibul Islam
Player of the match: Mehidy Hasan Miraz (Mohammedan Sporting Club)

- Shinepukur Cricket Club won the toss and elected to bat.

Match 45
24 March 2025
09:30
Scorecard

Prime Bank Cricket Club; 321/3 (50 overs)	v	Agrani Bank Cricket Club; 287 (47.3 overs)
Irfan Sukkur 107* (94); Nayeem Hasan 1/60 (9 overs)		Imrul Kayes 116 (115); Arafat Sunny 3/39 (7 overs)

Prime Bank Cricket Club won by 34 runs
BKSP Cricket Ground 4, Savar
Umpires: Gazi Sohel and Shafeen Shareef
Player of the match: Irfan Sukkur (Prime Bank Cricket Club)

- Prime Bank Cricket Club won the toss and elected to bat.

Match 46
25 March 2025
09:00
Scorecard

Gulshan Cricket Club; 281/8 (50 overs)	v	Gazi Group Cricketers; 283/6 (48.2 overs)
Litton Das 83 (62); Aminul Islam 2/34 (4 overs)		Anamul Haque 144* (142); Elias Sunny 3/54 (10 overs)

Gazi Group Cricketers won by 4 wickets
Bangladesh Krira Shikkha Protisthan No 4 Ground, Savar
Umpires: Ishtiaq Ahmed and Masudur Rahman
Player of the match: Anamul Haque (Gazi Group Cricketers)

- Gulshan Cricket Club won the toss and elected to bat.

Match 47
25 March 2025
09:00
Scorecard

Legends of Rupganj; 298/6 (50 overs)	v	Rupganj Tigers Cricket Club; 126 (42.2 overs)
Jaker Ali 73* (85); Husna Habib 2/53 (10 overs)		Abdul Mazid 43 (77); Samiun Basir 5/27 (10 overs)

Legends of Rupganj won by 172 runs
Sher-e-Bangla National Cricket Stadium, Dhaka
Umpires: Muhammad Kamruzzaman and Morshed Ali Khan
Player of the match: Samiun Basir (Legends of Rupganj)

- Rupganj Tigers Cricket Club won the toss and elected to field.

Match 48
25 March 2025
09:00
Scorecard

Brothers Union; 225/9 (50 overs)	v	Partex Sporting Club; 196 (48.1 overs)
Zahiduzzaman 47 (51); Tanvir Hossain 2/28 (8 overs)		Alauddin Babu 68 (46); Jayed Ullah 3/24 (10 overs)

Brothers Union won by 29 runs
Bangladesh Krira Shikkha Protisthan No 3 Ground, Savar
Umpires: Barkatulylah Turkey and Shahin Al Asad
Player of the match: Jayed Ullah (Brothers Union)

- Partex Sporting Club won the toss and elected to field.

=== Round 9 ===
Match 49
6 April 2025
09:00
Scorecard

Abahani Limited; 88 (25.4 overs)	v	Shinepukur Cricket Club; 89/0 (6.4 overs)
Minhajul Abedin 38 (55); Mosaddek Hossain 4/36 (6 overs)		Parvez Hossain Emon 61* (23)

Abahani Limited won by 10 wickets
BKSP Cricket Ground 3, Savar
Umpires: Barkatulylah Turkey and Shafeen Shareef
Player of the match: Mosaddek Hossain (Abahani Limited)

- Abahani Limited won the toss and elected to field first

Match 50
6 April 2025
09:00
Scorecard

Prime Bank Cricket Club; 174 (32.2 overs)	v	Mohammedan Sporting Club; 177/5 (30 overs)
Shamim Hossain 89 (61); Taijul Islam 4/5 (3.2 overs)		Mehidy Hasan Miraz 67* (55); Hasan Mahmud 3/33 (8 overs)

Mohammedan Sporting Club won by 5 wickets
Sher-e-Bangla National Cricket Stadium, Dhaka
Umpires: Gazi Sohel and Moniruzzaman
Player of the match: Mehidy Hasan Miraz (Mohammedan Sporting Club)

- Mohammedan Sporting Club won the toss and elected field first

Match 51
6 April 2025
09:00
Scorecard

Dhanmondi Cricket Club; 258/9 (50 overs)	v	Gulshan Cricket Club; 259/8 (49.4 overs)
Fazle Mahmud 65 (91); Asaduzzaman Payel 3/59 (10 overs)		Naeem Islam 68 (67); Moin Khan 2/42 (10 overs)

Gulshan Cricket Club won by 2 wickets
BKSP Cricket Ground 4, Savar
Umpires: Habibur Rahman and Tanvir Ahmed
Player of the match: Naeem Islam (Gulshan Cricket Club)

- Gulshan Cricket Club won the toss and elected to field first

Match 52
7 April 2025
09:30
Scorecard

Gazi Group Cricketers; 159 (42.1 overs)	v	Rupganj Tigers Cricket Club; 163/2 (33.3 overs)
Tahjibul Islam 31 (66); Mohiuddin Tareq 3/28 (5 overs)		Amit Majumder 76 (98); Abdul Gaffar Saqlain 1/9 (3 overs)

Rupganj Tigers Cricket Club won by 8 wickets
Sher-e-Bangla National Cricket Stadium, Dhaka
Umpires: Mahfuzur Rahman and Rakibul Islam
Player of the match: Amit Majumder (Rupganj Tigers Cricket Club)

- Rupganj Tigers Cricket Club won the toss and elected to field first

Match 53
7 April 2025
09:30
Scorecard

Partex Sporting Club; 129 (34.4 overs)	v	Legends of Rupganj; 132/0 (18.3 overs)
Rubel Mia 41 (48); Mahedi Hasan 4/34 (10 overs)		Tanzid Hasan 103* (59)

Legends of Rupganj won by 10 wickets
BKSP Cricket Ground 3, Savar
Umpires: Ashraful Islam and Muhammad Kamruzzaman
Player of the match: Tanzid Hasan (Legends of Rupganj)

- Legends of Rupganj won the toss and elected to field first

Match 54
7 April 2025
09:30
Scorecard

Brothers Union; 238/9 (50 overs)	v	Agrani Bank Cricket Club; 239/6 (48.4 overs)
Alok Kapali 58 (57); Taibur Rahman 4/41 (10 overs)		Shuvagata Hom 45* (35); Jayed Ullah 2/41 (10 overs)

Agrani Bank Cricket Club won by 4 wickets
BKSP Cricket Ground 4, Savar
Umpires: Morshed Ali Khan and Nazmul Hasan
Player of the match: Taibur Rahman (Agrani Bank Cricket Club)

- Agrani Bank Cricket Club won the toss and elected to field first

=== Round 10 ===
Match 55
9 April 2025
09:00
Scorecard

Abahani Limited; 290/9 (50 overs)	v	Prime Bank Cricket Club; 157 (32 overs)
Parvez Hossain Emon 79 (71); Hasan Mahmud 4/38 (10 overs)		Mohammad Naim 73 (74); Mosaddek Hossain 3/29 (7 overs)

Abahani Limited won by 133 runs
BKSP Cricket Ground 4, Savar
Umpires: Kamruzzaman Limon and Morshed Ali Khan
Player of the match: Mosaddek Hossain (Abahani Limited)

- Abahani Limited won the toss and elected to bat first

Match 56
9 April 2025
09:00
Scorecard

Agrani Bank Cricket Club; 287/7 (50 overs)	v	Mohammedan Sporting Club; 213 (47.2 overs)
Mushfiqur Rahim 75* (57); Arif Ahmed 3/47 (10 overs)		Amite Hasan 105 (123); Ebadot Hossain 3/34 (9 overs)

Mohammedan Sporting Club won by 74 runs
BKSP Cricket Ground 3, Savar
Umpires: Gazi Sohel and Habibur Rahman
Player of the match: Mushfiqur Rahim (Mohammedan Sporting Club)

- Agrani Bank Cricket Club won the toss and elected to field first

Match 57
9 April 2025
09:00
Scorecard

Gulshan Cricket Club; 178 (41 overs)	v	Shinepukur Cricket Club; 173 (43 overs)
Sakib Shahriyar 38 (51); Neon Yeasin Zaman 3/37 (8 overs)		Sharear Sakib 40 (54); Azizul Hakim Tamim 3/20 (10 overs)

Gulshan Cricket Club won by 5 runs
Sher-e-Bangla National Cricket Stadium, Dhaka
Umpires: Amit Mojumder and Mahfuzur Rahman
Player of the match: Azizul Hakim Tamim (Gulshan Cricket Club)

- Shinepukur Cricket Club won the toss and elected to field first

Match 58
10 April 2025
09:00
Scorecard

Rupganj Tigers Cricket Club; 280 (50 overs)	v	Dhanmondi Sports Club; 284/5 (47.1 overs)
Nasir Hossain 77 (84); Fazle Mahmud 3/59 (10 overs)		Nurul Hasan 97 (95); Nuhayel Sandeed 3/65 (10 overs)

Dhanmondi Sports Club won by 5 wickets
BKSP Cricket Ground 4, Savar
Umpires: Mozahiduzzaman and Shyful Islam
Player of the match: Fazle Mahmud (Dhanmondi Sports Club)

- Dhanmondi Sports Club won the toss and elected to field first

Match 59
10 April 2025
09:00
Scorecard

Partex Sporting Club; 302/7(50 overs)	v	Gazi Group Cricketers; 132/9 (31.5 overs)
Anamul Haque 78 (90); Yasen Muntasir 2/42 (10 overs)		Adil Bin Siddik 53* (85); Tofael Ahmed 2/5 (2 overs)

Gazi Group Cricketers won by 170 runs
BKSP Cricket Ground 3, Savar
Umpires: Asadur Rahman and Barkatulylah Turkey
Player of the match: Ruyel Miah (Gazi Group Cricketers)

- Partex Sporting Club won the toss and elected to field first

Match 60
10 April 2025
09:00
Scorecard

Legends of Rupganj; 277/9 (50 overs)	v	Brothers Union; 260/9 (48.4 overs)
Soumya Sarkar 80 (79); Yeasin Arafat 3/56 (10 overs)		Mahfijul Islam 76 (108); Shoriful Islam 6/40 (10 overs)

Legends of Rupganj won by 10 runs (DLS method)
Sher-e-Bangla National Cricket Stadium, Dhaka
Umpires: Shafeen Shareef and Tanvir Ahmed
Player of the match: Shoriful Islam (Legends of Rupganj)

- Brothers Union won the toss and elected to field first

=== Round 11 ===
Match 61
12 April 2025
09:00
Scorecard

Abahani Limited; 264 (48.2 overs)	v	Mohammedan Sporting Club; 225 (47.2 overs)
Anisul Islam Emon 114 (118); Nahid Rana 3/49 (9.2 overs)		Najmul Hossain Shanto 80 (113); Ebadot Hossain 4/36 (9.2 overs)

Mohammedan Sporting Club won by 39 runs
Sher-e-Bangla National Cricket Stadium, Dhaka
Umpires: Sharfuddoula and Tanvir Ahmed
Player of the match: Anisul Islam Emon (Mohammedan Sporting Club)

- Abahani Limited won the toss and elected to field first

Match 62
12 April 2025
09:00
Scorecard

Prime Bank Cricket Club; 203 (47.3 overs)	v	Gulshan Cricket Club; 204/5(37.1 overs)
Sajjadul Haque 51* (73); Mehedi Hasan 3/35 (7.3 overs)		Azizul Hakim Tamim 105 (106); Naeem Ahmed 2/45 (10 overs)

Gulshan Cricket Club won by 5 wickets
BKSP Cricket Ground 4, Savar
Umpires: Mahfuzur Rahman and Shafeen Shareef
Player of the match: Azizul Hakim Tamim (Gulshan Cricket Club)

- Prime Bank Cricket Club won the toss and elected to bat first

Match 63
12 April 2025
09:00
Scorecard

Shinepukur Cricket Club; 250/6 (50 overs)	v	Rupganj Tigers Cricket Club; 222 (48.1 overs)
Abdul Mazid 102* (139); Shariful Islam 2/34 (10 overs)		Rahim Ahmed 53 (90); Mahmudul Hasan 4/31 (9 overs)

Rupganj Tigers Cricket Club won by 28 runs
BKSP Cricket Ground 4, Savar
Umpires: ATM Ikram and Reazul Islam
Player of the match: Abdul Mazid (Rupganj Tigers Cricket Club)

- Shinepukur Cricket Club won the toss and elected to field first

Match 64
13 April 2025
09:00
Scorecard

Dhanmondi Cricket Club; 229 (49 overs)	v	Partex Sporting Club; 234/8 (48 overs)
Yasir Ali 90 (106); Shahidul Islam 5/31 (10 overs)		Ahrar Amin 85* (126); Sunzamul Islam 5/32 (10 overs)

Partex Sporting Club won by 2 wickets
BKSP Cricket Ground 3, Savar
Umpires: Habibur Rahman and Shyful Islam
Player of the match: Ahrar Amin (Partex Sporting Club)

- Partex Sporting Club won the toss and elected to field first

Match 65
13 April 2025
09:00
Scorecard

Gazi Group Cricketers; 301 (50 overs)	v	Brothers Union; 250 (43.1 overs)
Shamsur Rahman 84 (90); Sumon Khan 4/64 (10 overs)		Zahiduzzaman 122 (92); Wasi Siddiquee 6/52 (10 overs)

Gazi Group Cricketers won by 51 runs
BKSP Cricket Ground 4, Savar
Umpires: Kamruzzaman Limon and Muhammad Kamruzzaman
Player of the match: Wasi Siddiquee (Gazi Group Cricketers)

- Brothers Union won the toss and elected to field first

Match 66
13 April 2025
09:00
Scorecard

Agrani Bank Cricket Club; 306/6 (50 overs)	v	Legends of Rupganj; 217 (40.1 overs)
Shadman Islam 87 (104); Rejaur Rahman Raja 2/47 (6 overs)		Mahmudul Hasan Joy 33 (34); Robiul Hoque 4/39 (7.1 overs)

Agrani Bank Cricket Club won by 89 runs
Sher-e-Bangla National Cricket Stadium, Dhaka
Umpires: Amit Mojumder and Mozahiduzzaman
Player of the match: Robiul Hoque (Agrani Bank Cricket Club)

- Legends of Rupganj won the toss and elected to field first

== Super League ==
=== Round 1 ===
Match 67
17 April 2025
9:00 am
Scorecard

Mohammedan Sporting Club; 117/7 (29.4 overs)	v	Legends of Rupganj; 94/1 (13.2 overs)
Anisul Islam Emon 35 (34 overs); Tanvir Islam 3/37 (8 overs)		Saif Hassan 55* (44); Nasum Ahmed 1/30 (4)

Legends of Rupganj 9 wickets (DLS method)
Sher-e-Bangla National Cricket Stadium, Dhaka
Umpires: Mahfuzur Rahman and Muhammad Kamruzzaman
Player of the match: Tanvir Islam (Legends of Rupganj)

- Legends of Rupganj won the toss and elected to field first

Match 68
17 April 2025
9:00 am
Scorecard

Agrani Bank Cricket Club; 109/3 (24.4 overs)	v	Abahani Limited; 157/6 (19.2 overs)
Imrul Kayes 48* (52); Rakibul Hasan 1/11 (4.4 overs)		Jishan Alam 46 (27); Taibur Rahman 2/28 (5 overs)

Abahani Limited won by 4 wickets (DLS method)
BKSP Cricket Ground 3, Savar
Umpires: Kamruzzaman Limon and Moniruzzaman
Player of the match: Jishan Alam (Abahani Limited)

- Abahani Limited won the toss and elected to field first

Match 69
17 April 2025
9:00 am
Scorecard

Gazi Group Cricketers; 110/3 (23.3 overs)	v	Gulshan Cricket Club; 165/7 (21.4 overs)
Sadikur Rahman 36 (56); Shahadot Hossain Sobug 1/25 (8.3 overs)		Naeem Islam 56* (33); Sheikh Parvez Jibon 3/29 (4 overs)

Gulshan Cricket Club won by 3 wickets (DLS method)
BKSP Cricket Ground 4, Savar
Umpires: Rakibul Islam and Tanvir Ahmed
Player of the match: Naeem Islam (Gulshan Cricket Club)

- Gulshan Cricket Club won the toss and elected to field first

=== Round 2 ===
Match 71
20 April 2025
9:00 am
Scorecard

Agrani Bank Cricket Club; 240/9 (42 overs)	v	Mohammedan Sporting Club; 241/3(36.1 overs)
Imrul Kayes 41 (29); Mohammad Saifuddin 4/47 (9 overs)		Rony Talukdar 122* (100); Arif Ahmed 3/44 (8 overs)

Mohammedan Sporting Club won by 7 wicket
BKSP Cricket Ground 3, Savar
Umpires: Mozahiduzzaman and Nazmul Hasan
Player of the match: Rony Talukdar (Mohammedan Sporting Club)

- Mohammedan Sporting Club won the toss and elected to field first

Match 72
20 April 2025
9:00 am
Scorecard

Abahani Limited; 278 (49.5 overs)	v	Gulshan Cricket Club; 228 (50 overs)
Parvez Hossain Emon 83 (70); Farhad Reza 3/39 (10 overs)		Nihaduzzaman 82* (73); Rakibul Hasan 2/17 (10 overs)

Abahani Limited won by 50 runs
Sher-e-Bangla National Cricket Stadium, Dhaka
Umpires: Sajedul Islam and Sharfuddoula
Player of the match: Parvez Hossain Emon (Abahani Limited)

- Gulshan Cricket Club won the toss and elected to field first

Match 73
20 April 2025
9:00 am
Scorecard

Legends of Rupganj; 223 (39.2 overs)	v	Gazi Group Cricketers; 224/3 (41 overs)
Tanzid Hasan 68 (53); Sheikh Parvez Jibon 5/36 (7 overs)		Anamul Haque 110* (105); Mahedi Hasan 2/57 (9 overs)

Gazi Group Cricketers won by 7 wickets
BKSP Cricket Ground 4, Savar
Umpires: Imran Parvez and Mahfuzur Rahman
Player of the match: Anamul Haque (Gazi Group Cricketers)

- Legends of Rupganj won the toss and elected to bat first

=== Round 3 ===
Match 75
23 April 2025
9:00 am
Scorecard

Gulshan Cricket Club; 224 (47.4 overs)	v	Mohammedan Sporting Club; 225/5 (46.4 overs)
Shakil Hossain 57 (71); Mohammad Saifuddin 3/42 (8.4 overs)		Mahmudullah 71 (103); Shahadot Hossain Sobug 1/36 (8 overs)

Mohammedan Sporting Club won by 5 wickets
BKSP Cricket Ground 3, Savar
Umpires: Morshed Ali Khan and Rakibul Islam
Player of the match: Mahmudullah (Mohammedan Sporting Club)

- Mohammedan Sporting Club won the toss and elected to field first

Match 76
23 April 2025
9:00 am
Scorecard

Abahani Limited; 249 (48.2 overs)	v	Gazi Group Cricketers; 239 (49.3 overs)
Shahriar Komol 96 (100); Wasi Siddiquee 4/38 (8.2 overs)		Anamul Haque 108 (113); Mrittunjoy Chowdhury 3/51 (6.3 overs)

Abahani Limited won by 10 runs
Sher-e-Bangla National Cricket Stadium, Dhaka
Umpires: Ishtiaq Ahmed and Muhammad Kamruzzaman
Player of the match: Shahriar Komol (Abahani Limited)

- Gazi Group Cricketers won the toss and elected to field first

Match 77
23 April 2025
9:00 am
Scorecard

Legends of Rupganj; 333/3 (50 overs)	v	Agrani Bank Cricket Club; 230 (43.1 overs)
Soumya Sarkar 153* (112); Shuvagata Hom 1/26 (10 overs)		Marshall Ayub 74 (96); Saif Hassan 3/28 (8 overs)

Legends of Rupganj won by 103 runs
BKSP Cricket Ground 4, Savar
Umpires: Habibur Rahman and Mozahiduzzaman
Player of the match: Soumya Sarkar (Legends of Rupganj)

- Agrani Bank Cricket Club won the toss and elected to field first

=== Round 4 ===
Match
26 April 2025
9:00 am
Scorecard

Gazi Group Cricketers; 236 (49.4 overs)	v	Mohammedan Sporting Club; 237/6 (50 overs)
Munim Shahriar 80 (82); Mohammad Saifuddin 3/42 (9.4 overs)		Rony Talukdar 55 (83); Shamim Mia 2/29 (9 overs)

Mohammedan Sporting Club won by 4 wickets
Sher-e-Bangla National Cricket Stadium, Dhaka
Umpires: Ali Arman and Moniruzzaman
Player of the match: Mohammad Saifuddin

- Gazi Group Cricketers won the toss and elected to bat first

Match
April 2025
9:00 am
Scorecard

Legends of Rupganj; 225/9 (50 overs)	v	Abahani Limited; 226/3 (37.3 overs)
Mehedi Maruf 48 (88); Mosaddek Hossain 4/41 (10 overs)		Parvez Hossain Emon 73 (84); Shadhin Islam 1/36 (10 overs)

Abahani Limited won by 7 wickets
BKSP Cricket Ground 4, Savar
Umpires: Morshed Ali Khan and Tanvir Ahmed
Player of the match: Mosaddek Hossain

- Abahani Limited won the toss and elected to field first

Match
April 2025
9:00 am

v

=== Round 5 ===
Match
April 2025
9:00 am

v

Match
April 2025
9:00 am

v

Match
April 2025
9:00 am

v

== Relegation League ==
Match 70
18 April 2025
9:00 am
Scorecard

Partex Sporting Club; 264/7 (50 overs)	v	Shinepukur Cricket Club; 245 (48.5 overs)
Rubel Mia 100 (120); Shahin Alam 3/54 (7 overs)		Rayan Rahman 59 (83); Alauddin Babu 3/33 (9 overs)

Partex Sporting Club won by 19 runs
Sher-e-Bangla National Cricket Stadium, Dhaka
Umpires: Mozahiduzzaman and Nazmul Hasan
Player of the match: Rubel Mia (Partex Sporting Club)

- Shinepukur Cricket Club won the toss and elected to field first

Match 75
21 April 2025
9:00 am
Scorecard

Shinepukur Cricket Club; 180/9 (33 overs)	v	Brothers Union; 186/4 (30 overs)
Minhajul Abedin 59* (54); Rahatul Ferdous 3/37 (7 overs)		Zahiduzzaman 85* (88); BM Anowar Hossain 2/26 (7 overs)

Brothers Union won by 6 wickets
Sher-e-Bangla National Cricket Stadium, Dhaka
Umpires: Ali Arman and Barkatulylah Turkey
Player of the match: Zahiduzzaman (Brothers Union)

- Shinepukur Cricket Club won the toss and elected to bat first

Match 78
24 April 2025
9:00 am
Scorecard

Brothers Union; 294/9 (50 overs)	v	Partex Sporting Club; 181 (37.1 overs)
98 (97); Yasen Muntasir 2/34 (10 overs)		Adil Bin Siddik 85 (74); Rakibul Atik 3/36 (10 overs)

Brothers Union won by 113 runs
Sher-e-Bangla National Cricket Stadium, Dhaka
Umpires: Masudur Rahman and Morshed Ali Khan
Player of the match: Mahfijul Islam (Brothers Union)

- Brothers Union won the toss and elected to bat first

== Statistics ==
=== Most runs ===
Player	Team	Inns	Runs	Ave	HS	SR
Anamul Haque	GCC	11	665	88.33	149*	96.89
Mohammad Naim	PBCC	11	618	61.80	176	122.75
Parvez Hossain Emon	ABL	11	569	71.12	126	101.60
Nurul Hasan	DSC	11	522	58.00	132*	93.54
Shadman Islam	ABCC	11	469	46.90	115*	77.1
last update 13 April 2025 Source:ESPNCricinfo

=== Most wickets ===
Player	Team	Mat	Wkts	BBI	Econ
Rakibul Hasan	ABL	13	26	4/16	3.75
Taijul Islam	MSC	11	23	4/5	4.27
Mosaddek Hossain	ABL	13	22	4/36	4.10
Shoriful Islam	LOR	12	21	6/40	4.47
Arif Ahmed	Agran	12	21	3/28	4.31
last update 23 April 2025 Source: ESPNCricinfo

== Broadcast ==
Channels and streaming	Digital Streaming
T Sports	T Sports app / T Sports YouTube
