= 2024–25 Dhaka First Division Cricket League =

Cricket tournament

- Dates: 30 January 2025 – 9 March 2025
- Administrator: Bangladesh Cricket Board
- Cricket format: 50 over
- Tournament format: Round-robin
- Champions: City Club
- Participants: 20
- Matches: 124
- Player of the series: Md Rubel (Gazi Tyres Cricket Academy)
- Most runs: Rafsan Al Mahmud (City Club) 908
- Most wickets: Md Rubel (Gazi Tyres Cricket Academy) 43

The 2024–25 Dhaka First Division Cricket League was a season of the Dhaka First Division Cricket League, a 50 over cricket competition held in Bangladesh. It was contested by 20 club teams between January and March 2025. The two top teams earn promotion to the 2025–26 Dhaka Premier Division Cricket League. Gulshan Cricket Club were champions the previous season.

City Club won the tournament. Together with Dhaka Leopards they earned promotion to the Premier League for 2025–26.

== Teams ==
- Amber Sporting Club
- Axiom Cricketers
- Azim Cricket Club
- Bangladesh Police Cricket Club
- Blues Cricket
- City Club
- Dhaka Spartans Cricket Club
- Dhaka Leopards
- Gazi Tyres Cricket Academy
- Azad Sporting Club
- Khelaghar Samaj Kallyan Samity
- Kala Bagan Krira Chakra
- Kakrail Boys Club
- Kalindi Krira Chakra
- Old DOHS Sports Club
- Orient Sporting Club
- Lalmatia Club
- Surjo Torun Club
- Sheikh Jamal Cricketers
- Uttara Cricket Club

== League Stage ==
=== Group A ===
Pos	Team	Pld	W	L	T	NR	Pts	NRR
1	Dhaka Leopards	9	7	2	0	0	14	1.450
2	Amber Sporting Club	9	6	3	0	0	12	0.886
3	Gazi Tyres Cricket Academy	9	6	3	0	0	12	0.191
4	Uttara Cricket Club	9	6	3	0	0	12	−0.226
5	Surjo Torun Club	9	5	4	0	0	10	0.514
6	Kalindi Krira Chakra	9	5	4	0	0	10	−0.369
7	Kakrail Boys Club	9	3	6	0	0	6	0.002
8	Kalabagan Krira Chakra	9	3	6	0	0	6	−0.368
9	Axiom Cricketers	9	2	7	0	0	4	−0.851
10	Azad Sporting Club	9	2	7	0	0	4	−1.241

Source: Cricheroes

The four top-ranked teams will qualify for the
Advance to Super League
The two Bottom-ranked teams will qualify for the
Advance to Relegation League

=== Group B ===
Pos	Team	Pld	W	L	T	NR	Pts	NRR
1	City Club	9	8	1	0	0	16	0.353
2	Bangladesh Police Cricket Club	9	5	4	0	0	10	0.549
3	Khelaghar Samaj Kallyan Samity	9	5	4	0	0	10	0.529
4	Sheikh Jamal Cricketers	9	5	4	0	0	10	0.305
5	Lalmatia Club	9	5	4	0	0	10	0.186
6	Prime Doleshwar Sporting Club	9	5	4	0	0	10	−0.484
7	Old DOHS Sports Club	9	4	5	0	0	8	−0.071
8	Dhaka Spartans Cricket Club	9	3	6	0	0	6	−0.312
9	Orient Sporting Club	9	3	6	0	0	6	−0.423
10	Blues Cricket	9	2	7	0	0	4	−0.554

Source: Cricheroes

The four top-ranked teams will qualify for the
Advance to Super League
The two Bottom-ranked teams will qualify for the
Advance to Relegation League

== Relegation League ==
Relegation League

Pos	Team	Pld	W	L	T	NR	Pts	NRR
1	Blues Cricket	3	3	0	0	0	6	0.483
2	Orient Sporting Club	3	2	1	0	0	4	0.449
3	Azad Sporting Club (R)	3	1	2	0	0	2	−0.034
4	Axiom Cricketers (R)	3	0	3	0	0	0	−2.610

Source: Cricheroes

Team relegated to the 2025–26 Dhaka Second Division Cricket League

24 February 2025
Scorecard

Axiom Cricketers; 134 (32.3 overs)	v	Blues Cricket; 137/1 (32.3 overs)

Blues Cricketers won by 9 wickets
PKSP-1, Dhaka

- Blues Cricketers opt to field

24 February 2025
Scorecard

Orient Sporting Club; 293/7 (50 overs)	v	Azad Sporting Club; 273/8 (50 overs)

Orient Sporting Club won by 20 runs
PKSP-2, Dhaka

- Azad Sporting Club opt to field

26 February 2025
Scorecard

Azad Sporting Club; 210 (50 overs)	v	Blues Cricket; 212/4 (45.1 overs)

Blues Cricketers won by 6 wickets
PKSP-2, Dhaka

- Blues Cricketers won the toss and elected to field

26 February 2025
Scorecard

Orient Sporting Club; 256/8 (50 overs)	v	Axiom Cricketers; 153 (46.5 overs)

Orient Sporting Club won by 103 runs
PKSP-1, Dhaka

- Axiom Cricketers won the toss and elected to field

28 February 2025
Scorecard

Axiom Cricketers; 249 (49.3 overs)	v	Azad Sporting Club; 252/5 (42.4 overs)

Azad Sporting Club won by 5 wickets
PKSP-2, Dhaka

- Axiom Cricketers opt to bat

28 February 2025
Scorecard

Blues Cricket; 318/8 (50.0 overs)	v	Orient Sporting Club; 232 (44.4 overs)

Blues Cricketers won by 86 runs
PKSP-1, Dhaka

- Orient Sporting Club opt to field

== Super League ==
Point Table

Team	Pld	W	L	A	Pts
City Club (C)	7	5	2	0	10
Dhaka Leopards	7	5	2	0	10
Gazi Tyres Cricket Academy	7	4	2	1	9
Uttara Cricket Club	7	3	3	1	7
Bangladesh Police Cricket Club	7	3	4	0	6
Khelaghar Samaj Kallyan Samity	7	3	4	0	6
Amber Sporting Club	7	2	4	1	5
Sheikh Jamal Cricketers	7	1	5	1	3

Promoted to 2025–26 Dhaka Premier Division Cricket League.

=== Round 1 ===
Match 1
23 February 2025
Scorecard

Uttara Cricket Club	v	Gazi Tyres Cricket Academy

Abandoned (match abandoned due to wet pitch.)
PKSP-2, Dhaka

Match 2
23 February 2025
Scorecard

City Club; 243/5 (47.0 overs)	v	Bangladesh Police Cricket Club; 244/7 (46.2 overs)

Bangladesh Police Cricket Club won by 3 wickets
BKSP Ground 4, Dhaka

- Bangladesh Police Cricket Club opt to field
- Match reduced to 47 over’s per side due to wet outfield

Match 3
23 February 2025
Scorecard

Dhaka Leopards; 250/7 (25 overs)	v	Khelaghar Samaj Kallyan Samity; 173/8 (25 overs)

Dhaka Leopards won by 77 runs
BKSP Ground 3, Dhaka

- Khelaghar Samaj Kallyan Samity opt to field
- Match reduced to 25 over’s per side due to wet outfield

Match 4
23 February 2025
Scorecard

Sheikh Jamal Cricketers	v	Amber Sporting Club

Abandoned (Match Abandoned due to Adverse Weather Condition)
Friends Cricket Ground, Dhaka

=== Round 2 ===
Match 5
25 February 2025
Scorecard

Gazi Tyres Cricket Academy; 294/5 (50 overs)	v	Bangladesh Police Cricket Club; 227 (46.3 overs)

Gazi Tyres Cricket Academy won by 67 runs
BKSP Ground 3, Dhaka

- Bangladesh Police Cricket Club opt to field

Match 6
25 February 2025
Scorecard

Uttara Cricket Club; 265 (49.5 overs)	v	Amber Sporting Club; 266/8 (49.2 overs)

Amber Sporting Club won by 2 wickets
BKSP Ground 4, Dhaka

- Amber Sporting Club opt to field

Match 7
25 February 2025
Scorecard

Sheikh Jamal Cricketers; 75 (35.3 overs)	v	Dhaka Leopards; 81/3 (16.2 overs)

Dhaka Leopards won by 7 wickets
PKSP-2, Dhaka

- Dhaka Leopards opt to field

Match 8
25 February 2025
Scorecard

Khelaghar Samaj Kallyan Samity; 296/6 (50 overs)	v	City Club; 297/7 (49.5 overs)

City Club won by 3 wickets
Friends Cricket Ground, Dhaka

- City Club opt to field

=== Round 3 ===
Match 9
27 February 2025
Scorecard

Bangladesh Police Cricket Club; 265/7 (50 overs)	v	Khelaghar Samaj Kallyan Samity; 184 (37.4 overs)

Bangladesh Police Cricket Club won by 81 runs
PKSP-2, Dhaka

Match 10
27 February 2025
Scorecard

Gazi Tyres Cricket Academy; 234 (49.5 overs)	v	Amber Sporting Club; 145 (36.1 overs)

Gazi Tyres Cricket Academy won by 89 runs
BKSP Ground 3, Dhaka

Match 11
2025
Scorecard

Dhaka Leopards; 308/7 (50 overs)	v	Uttara Cricket Club; 309/3 (48.3 overs)

Uttara Cricket Club won by 7 wickets
PKSP-1, Dhaka

Match 12
27 February 2025
Scorecard

Sheikh Jamal Cricketers; 214/9 (50 overs)	v	City Club; 216/5 (34.1 overs)

City Club won by 5 wickets
Behara Teguria Cricket Stadium, Dhaka

=== Round 4 ===
Match 13
1 March 2025
Scorecard

Khelaghar Samaj Kallyan Samity; 236 (41.4 overs)	v	Sheikh Jamal Cricketers; 239/7 (45.4 overs)

Sheikh Jamal Cricketers won by 3 wickets
City Club Ground Mirpur, Dhaka

Match 14
1 March 2025
Scorecard

Bangladesh Police Cricket Club; 251/6 (50 overs)	v	Amber Sporting Club; 252/7 (45.4 overs)

Amber Sporting Club won by 4 wickets
BKSP Ground 3, Dhaka

Match 15
2025
Scorecard

Uttara Cricket Club; 286/3 (50 overs)	v	City Club; 290/3 (40.5 overs)

City Club won by 7 wickets
BKSP Ground 4, Dhaka

Match 16
1 March 2025
Scorecard

Dhaka Leopards; 254/7 (43 overs)	v	Gazi Tyres Cricket Academy; 255/8 (42 overs)

Gazi Tyres Cricket Academy won by 2 wickets
PKSP-2, Dhaka

=== Round 5 ===
Match 17
3 March 2025
Scorecard

Amber Sporting Club; 73 (22.4 overs)	v	Dhaka Leopards; 77/3 (15.5 overs)

Dhaka Leopards won by 7 wickets
BKSP Ground 1, Dhaka

Match 18
3 March 2025
Scorecard

Bangladesh Police Cricket Club; 254 (47.1 overs)	v	Sheikh Jamal Cricketers; 226 (46.6 overs)

Bangladesh Police Cricket Club won by 28 runs
PKSP-1, Dhaka

Match 19
3 March 2025
Scorecard

Gazi Tyres Cricket Academy; 237/9 (45 overs)	v	City Club; 238/4 (44.3 overs)

won by 6 wickets
PKSP-2, Dhaka

Match 20
3 March 2025
Scorecard

Khelaghar Samaj Kallyan Samity; 241/8 (40 overs)	v	Uttara Cricket Club; 230/9 (40 overs)

Khelaghar Samaj Kallyan Samity won by 11 runs
Behara Teguria Cricket Stadium, Dhaka

=== Round 6 ===
Match 21
5 March 2025
Scorecard

Sheikh Jamal Cricketers; 247/8 (50 overs)	v	Uttara Cricket Club; 249/6 (37.4 overs)

Uttara Cricket Club won by 4 wickets
BKSP Ground 1, Dhaka

- Sheikh Jamal Cricketers opt to bat

Match 22
5 March 2025
Scorecard

Khelaghar Samaj Kallyan Samity; 188 (44.2 overs)	v	Gazi Tyres Cricket Academy; 145 (30.2 overs)

Khelaghar Samaj Kallyan Samity won by 43 runs
PKSP-2, Dhaka

- Gazi Tyres Cricket Academy opt to field

Gazi Tyres Cricket Academy

Match 23
5 March 2025
Scorecard

Dhaka Leopards; 302/6 (50 overs)	v	Bangladesh Police Cricket Club; 137 (38.1 overs)

Dhaka Leopards won by 155 runs
Behara Teguria Cricket Stadium, Dhaka

- Dhaka Leopards opt to bat

Match 24
5 March 2025
Scorecard

City Club; 295/3 (50 overs)	v	Amber Sporting Club; 211 (46.2 overs)

City Club won by 84 runs
PKSP-1, Dhaka

- Amber Sporting Club opt to field

=== Round 7 ===
Match 25
9 March 2025
Scorecard

Amber Sporting Club; 365/3 (50 overs)	v	Khelaghar Samaj Kallyan Samity; 368/6 (49.2 overs)

Khelaghar Samaj Kallyan Samity won by 4 wickets
Behara Teguria Cricket Stadium, Dhaka

- Amber Sporting Club opt to bat

Match 26
9 March 2025
Scorecard

Sheikh Jamal Cricketers; 233 (44.2 overs)	v	Gazi Tyres Cricket Academy; 234/8 (42.2 overs)

Gazi Tyres Cricket Academy won by 2 wickets
PKSP-1, Dhaka

- Gazi Tyres Cricket Academy opt to bat

Match 27
9 March 2025
Scorecard

Bangladesh Police Cricket Club; 315 (48.3 overs)	v	Uttara Cricket Club; 316/6 (49.2 overs)

Uttara Cricket Club won by 4 wickets
BKSP Ground-3, Dhaka

- Uttara Cricket Club opt to field

Match 28
9 March 2025
Scorecard

City Club; 147 (37.l overs)	v	Dhaka Leopards; 149/3 (17.3 overs)

Dhaka Leopards won by 7 wickets
PKSP -2, Dhaka

- Dhaka Leopards opt to field
