= 2024 Comilla Victorians season =

2024 Bangladesh Premier League cricket team

Comilla Victorians
2024 season
- Coach: Mohammad Salahuddin
- Captain: Litton Das
- BPL League: Runners-up
- Most runs: Towhid Hridoy (462)
- Most wickets: Tanvir Islam & Mustafizur Rahman (17)
- Most catches: Towhid Hridoy (7)
- Most wicket-keeping dismissals: Litton Das (6)

The 2024 season is the 8th and the last season so far for the Bangladesh Premier League franchise Comilla Victorians. They were one of the seven teams participated in the 2024 Bangladesh Premier League. They were the defending champions, having won their 4th BPL title after defeating Sylhet Strikers in the 2023 Bangladesh Premier League final.

Ahead of this season, Litton Das was made the captain after Imrul Kayes denied continuing as captain of the team. They lost against the later 7th ranked team Durdanto Dhaka in the first match. Though they reached final three times in a row, they couldn't defend it as Fortune Barishal defeated them by 6 wickets. They finished the league stage at the 2nd place with 8 wins and 4 losses, obtaining 16 points.

== Squad ==
Name	Nationality Bangladesh	Batting style	Bowling style
Batters
Towhid Hridoy	Bangladesh	Right Handed	Right arm off-spin
Imrul Kayes	Bangladesh	Left Handed	Left Arm Orthodox
Johnson Charles	West Indies	Right-handed	Slow left-arm orthodox
Khushdil Shah	Pakistan	Left Handed	Slow left-arm orthodox
Md Anamul Haque	Bangladesh	Right-handed	Right-arm off-spin
Wicket-Keepers
Liton Das (wk) (c)	Bangladesh	Right-handed	Right-arm off-spin
Mohammad Rizwan (wk)	Pakistan	Right-handed	Right-arm medium
Jaker Ali (wk)	Bangladesh	Right-handed	
Mahidul Islam Ankon (wk)	Bangladesh	Right-handed	
All-rounders
Moeen Ali	England	Left Handed	Right arm off break
Sunil Narine	West Indies	Left Handed	Right Arm Off Spin
Andre Russell	West Indies	Right Handed	Right Arm Fast-Medium
Roston Chase	West Indies	Right Handed	Right-arm off break
Matthew Forde	West Indies	Right Handed	Right arm medium
Bowlers
Mustafizur Rahman	Bangladesh	Left Handed	Left Arm Fast-Medium
Mrittunjoy Chowdhury	Bangladesh	Left Handed	Left Arm Fast-Medium
Tanvir Islam	Bangladesh	Left Handed	Left Arm Orthodox
Musfik Hasan	Bangladesh	Right Handed	Right Arm Fast-Medium
Rishad Hossain	Bangladesh	Right Handed	Right Arm Legbreak
Aliss Islam	Bangladesh	Right Handed	Right-Arm Offbreak

- Source: ESPNcricinfo

== Sponsors ==
- Main shirt sponsor: Orion Electronics
- Back shirt sponsor: Abul Khair Steel & Walton
- Chest branding: Premier Bank

== League stage ==
=== Points table ===
Pos	Team	Pld	W	L	T	NR	Pts	NRR	Qualification
1	Rangpur Riders	12	9	3	0	0	18	1.438	Advance to Qualifier 1
2	Comilla Victorians	12	8	4	0	0	16	1.149	Advance to Qualifier 1
3	Fortune Barishal (C)	12	7	5	0	0	14	0.414	Advance to Eliminator
4	Chattogram Challengers	12	7	5	0	0	14	−0.410	Advance to Eliminator
5	Khulna Tigers	12	5	7	0	0	10	−0.447	
6	Sylhet Strikers	12	5	7	0	0	10	−0.748	
7	Durdanto Dhaka	12	1	11	0	0	2	−1.420	

Source: ESPN Cricinfo
(C) Champions

=== Fixtures and results ===
Match 1
19 January 2024
14:00
Scorecard

Comilla Victorians; 143/6 (20 overs)	v	Durdanto Dhaka; 147/5 (19.3 overs)
Imrul Kayes 66 (56); Shoriful Islam 3/27 (4 overs)		Mohammad Naim 52 (40); Tanvir Islam 2/27 (4 overs)

Durdanto Dhaka won by 5 wickets
Sher-e-Bangla National Cricket Stadium, Dhaka
Umpires: David Millns (Eng) and Mahfuzur Rahman (Ban)
Player of the match: Shoriful Islam (Durdanto Dhaka)

- Durdanto Dhaka won the toss and elected to field.
- Musfik Hasan (Comilla Victorians) made his T20 debut.

Match 8
23 January 2024
18:30 (N)
Scorecard

Fortune Barishal; 161/9 (20 overs)	v	Comilla Victorians; 162/6 (19.5 overs)
Mushfiqur Rahim 62 (44); Mustafizur Rahman 3/32 (4 overs)		Imrul Kayes 52 (41); Dunith Wellalage 3/26 (4 overs)

Comilla Victorians won by 4 wickets
Sher-e-Bangla National Cricket Stadium, Dhaka
Umpires: Moniruzzaman (Ban) and Asif Yaqoob (Pak)
Player of the match: Matthew Forde (Comilla Victorians)

- Comilla Victorians won the toss and elected to field.

Match 10
26 January 2024
19:00 (N)
Scorecard

Comilla Victorians; 130/8 (20 overs)	v	Sylhet Strikers; 78 (16.2 overs)
Imrul Kayes 30 (28); Samit Patel 3/16 (4 overs)		Zakir Hasan 41 (34); Aliss Islam 4/17 (4 overs)

Comilla Victorians won by 52 runs
Sylhet International Cricket Stadium, Sylhet
Umpires: David Millns (Eng) and Mahfuzur Rahman (Ban)
Player of the match: Aliss Islam (Comilla Victorians)

- Sylhet Strikers won the toss and elected to field.

Match 15
30 January 2024
13:30
Scorecard

Rangpur Riders; 165/5 (20 overs)	v	Comilla Victorians; 157/6 (20 overs)
Babar Azam 37 (36); Raymon Reifer 2/20 (3 overs)		Mahidul Islam Ankon 63 (55); Azmatullah Omarzai 2/31 (4 overs)

Rangpur Riders won by 8 runs
Sylhet International Cricket Stadium, Sylhet
Umpires: Muhammad Kamruzzaman (Ban) and Asif Yaqoob (Pak)
Player of the match: Azmatullah Omarzai (Rangpur Riders)

- Rangpur Riders won the toss and elected to bat.

Match 18
2 February 2024
19:00 (N)
Scorecard

Chattogram Challengers; 72 (16.3 overs)	v	Comilla Victorians; 73/3 (9.2 overs)
Tom Bruce 27 (20); Tanvir Islam 4/13 (4 overs)		Towhid Hridoy 31 (13); Ziaur Rahman 1/12 (1 over)

Comilla Victorians won by 7 wickets
Sylhet International Cricket Stadium, Sylhet
Umpires: Tanvir Ahmed (Ban) and David Millns (Eng)
Player of the match: Tanvir Islam (Comilla Victorians)

- Comilla Victorians won the toss and elected to field.

Match 23
7 February 2024
13:30
Scorecard

Comilla Victorians; 149/7 (20 overs)	v	Khulna Tigers; 115 (18.5 overs)
Liton Das 45 (30); Nasum Ahmed 2/21 (4 overs)		Mohammad Wasim 23 (12); Aamer Jamal 5/23 (4 overs)

Comilla Victorians won by 34 runs
Sher-e-Bangla National Cricket Stadium, Dhaka
Umpires: David Millns (Eng) and Moniruzzaman (Ban)
Player of the match: Aamer Jamal (Comilla Victorians)

- Comilla Victorians won the toss and elected to bat.

Match 26
9 February 2024
19:00 (N)
Scorecard

Durdanto Dhaka; 175/4 (20 overs)	v	Comilla Victorians; 176/6 (19.5 overs)
Mohammad Naim 64 (45); Matthew Forde 3/35 (4 overs)		Towhid Hridoy 108* (57); Shoriful Islam 2/32 (4 overs)

Comilla Victorians won by 4 wickets
Sher-e-Bangla National Cricket Stadium, Dhaka
Umpires: Tanvir Ahmed (Ban) and David Millns (Eng)
Player of the match: Towhid Hridoy (Comilla Victorians)

- Durdanto Dhaka won the toss and elected to bat.

Match 29
13 February 2024
13:30
Scorecard

Comilla Victorians; 239/3 (20 overs)	v	Chattogram Challengers; 166 (16.3 overs)
Will Jacks 108* (53); Shohidul Islam 2/49 (4 overs)		Tanzid Hasan 41 (24); Rishad Hossain 4/22 (4 overs)

Comilla Victorians won by 73 runs
Zohur Ahmed Chowdhury Stadium, Chattogram
Umpires: Deighton Butler (WI) and Masudur Rahman (Ban)
Player of the match: Will Jacks (Comilla Victorians)

- Chattogram Challengers won the toss and elected to field.

Match 32
14 February 2024
18:30 (N)
Scorecard

Khulna Tigers; 164/8 (20 overs)	v	Comilla Victorians; 168/3 (16.3 overs)
Evin Lewis 36 (20); Matthew Forde 2/36 (4 overs)		Towhid Hridoy 91*; Mukidul Islam 1/28 (2 overs)

Comilla Victorians won by 7 wickets
Zohur Ahmed Chowdhury Stadium, Chattogram
Umpires: Tanvir Ahmed (Ban) and Deighton Butler (WI)
Player of the match: Towhid Hridoy (Comilla Victorians)

- Khulna Tigers won the toss and elected to bat.

Match 37
19 February 2024
13:30
Scorecard

Sylhet Strikers; 177/5 (20 overs)	v	Comilla Victorians; 165/6 (20 overs)
Benny Howell 62* (31); Sunil Narine 2/16 (4 overs)		Liton Das 85 (58); Tanzim Hasan Sakib 3/33 (3 overs)

Sylhet Strikers won by 12 runs
Zohur Ahmed Chowdhury Stadium, Chattogram
Umpires: Deighton Butler (WI) and Gazi Sohel (Ban)
Player of the match: Benny Howell (Sylhet Strikers)

- Sylhet Strikers won the toss and elected to bat.

Match 40
20 February 2024
18:30 (N)
Scorecard

Rangpur Riders; 150 (19.5 overs)	v	Comilla Victorians; 151/4 (17.3 overs)
James Neesham 69* (42); Musfik Hasan 3/18 (4 overs)		Andre Russell 43* (12); Shakib Al Hasan 3/20 (4 overs)

Comilla Victorians won by 6 wickets
Zohur Ahmed Chowdhury Stadium, Chattogram
Umpires: Deighton Butler (WI) and Masudur Rahman (Ban)
Player of the match: Andre Russell (Comilla Victorians)

- Comilla Victorians won the toss and elected to field.

Match 41
23 February 2024
14:00
Scorecard

Comilla Victorians; 140/8 (20 overs)	v	Fortune Barishal; 141/4 (19.4 overs)
Jaker Ali 38* (16); Taijul Islam 3/20 (3 overs)		Tamim Iqbal 66 (48); Musfik Hasan 2/19 (3.4 overs)

Fortune Barishal won by 6 wickets
Sher-e-Bangla National Cricket Stadium, Dhaka
Umpires: Deighton Butler (WI) and Gazi Sohel (Ban)
Player of the match: Tamim Iqbal (Fortune Barishal)

- Fortune Barishal won the toss and elected to field.

==== Qualifier 1 ====
Match 44
26 February 2024
18:30 (N)
Scorecard

Rangpur Riders; 185/6 (20 overs)	v	Comilla Victorians; 186/4 (18.3 overs)
James Neesham 97* (49); Andre Russell 2/37 (4 overs)		Liton Das 83 (57); Fazalhaq Farooqi 2/27 (3.3 overs)

Comilla Victorians won by 6 wickets
Sher-e-Bangla National Cricket Stadium, Dhaka
Umpires: Deighton Butler (WI) and Sharfuddoula (Ban)
Player of the match: Liton Das (Comilla Victorians)

- Comilla Victorians won the toss and elected to field.

==== Final ====
Match 46
1 March 2024
18:30 (N)
Scorecard

Comilla Victorians; 154/6 (20 overs)	v	Fortune Barishal; 157/4 (19 overs)
Mahidul Islam Ankon 38 (35); James Fuller 2/43 (4 overs)		Kyle Mayers 46 (30); Moeen Ali 2/28 (4 overs)

Fortune Barishal won by 6 wickets
Sher-e-Bangla National Cricket Stadium, Dhaka
Umpires: David Millns (Eng) and Sharfuddoula (Ban)
Player of the match: Kyle Mayers (Fortune Barishal)

- Fortune Barishal won the toss and elected to field.

== Statistics ==
=== Most runs ===
Runs	Player	Innings	Highest score	Batting average
462	Towhid Hridoy	14	108*	38.50
391	Litton Das	14	85	27.92
199	Jaker Ali	10	40*	99.50
157	Will Jacks	4	108*	52.33
156	Mahidul Islam Ankon	7	63	22.28

- Source: ESPNcricinfo

=== Most wickets ===
Wickets	Player	Innings	Overs	Runs conceded	Best bowling	Bowling average
13	Tanvir Islam	12	36.1	271	4/13	20.84
13	Mustafizur Rahman	10	31.3	294	3/32	22.61
10	Matthew Forde	8	28	218	3/35	21.80
9	Aliss Islam	8	29	208	4/17	23.11
8	Moeen Ali	7	19.3	175	4/23	21.87

- Source: ESPNcricinfo
