= 2023–24 Dhaka First Division Cricket League =

Cricket tournament

- Dates: 17 January 2024 – 29 February 2024
- Administrator: Bangladesh Cricket Board
- Cricket format: 50 over
- Tournament format: Round-robin
- Champions: Gulshan Cricket Club (1st title)
- Participants: 20
- Matches: 124

The 2023–24 Dhaka First Division Cricket League was the 2023–24 season of Dhaka First Division Cricket League, a 50-over cricket competition held in Bangladesh. Teams of 20 cricket clubs competed in the tournament that lasted from 17 January 2024 to 29 February 2024. Champion team will be promoted to 2024–25 Dhaka Premier Division Cricket League. Gazi Tyres Cricket Academy were champion of previous season.

== Teams ==
- Agrani Bank Cricket Club
- Axiom Cricketers
- Azad Sporting Club
- Dhaka Spartans Cricket Club
- Dhaka Leopards
- Dhaka Assets
- Gulshan Cricket Club
- Khelaghar Samaj Kallyan Samity
- Kala Bagan Krira Chakra
- Kakrail Boys Club
- Indira Road Krira Chakra
- Kalindi Krira Chakra
- Old DOHS Sports Club
- Orient Sporting Club
- Lalmatia Club
- Prime Doleshwar Sporting Club
- Surjo Torun Club
- Sheikh Jamal Cricketers
- Uttara Cricket Club
- Udayachal Club

== League Stage ==
=== Group A ===
| Pos | Team | Pld | W | L | T | NR | Pts | NRR |
|---|---|---|---|---|---|---|---|---|
| 1 | Agrani Bank Cricket Club | 9 | 7 | 2 | 0 | 0 | 14 | 0.736 |
| 2 | Gulshan Cricket Club | 9 | 7 | 2 | 0 | 0 | 14 | 0.518 |
| 3 | Orient Sporting Club | 9 | 6 | 3 | 0 | 0 | 12 | 0.710 |
| 4 | Khelaghar Samaj Kallyan Samity | 9 | 6 | 3 | 0 | 0 | 12 | 0.341 |
| 5 | Prime Doleshwar Sporting Club | 9 | 5 | 4 | 0 | 0 | 10 | 0.119 |
| 6 | Azad Sporting Club | 9 | 5 | 4 | 0 | 0 | 10 | 0.079 |
| 7 | Old DOHS Sports Club | 9 | 3 | 6 | 0 | 0 | 6 | −0.122 |
| 8 | Kakrail Boys Club | 9 | 3 | 6 | 0 | 0 | 6 | −0.141 |
| 9 | Indira Road Krira Chakra | 9 | 3 | 6 | 0 | 0 | 6 | −0.233 |
| 10 | Udayachal Club | 9 | 0 | 9 | 0 | 0 | 0 | −1.930 |

Updated to match(es) played on 14 February 2024. Source: Cricheroes

The four top-ranked teams will qualify for the
Advance to Super League
The two Bottom-ranked teams will qualify for the
Advance to Relegation League

==== Match Summary ====
Below is a summary of results for each team's nine regular season matches in chronological order. A team's opponent for any given match is listed above the margin of victory/defeat.

| Team | 1 | 2 | 3 | 4 | 5 | 6 | 7 | 8 | 9 |
|---|---|---|---|---|---|---|---|---|---|
| Khelghar (KSKS) | UDC; 8 wickets | ASC; 8 runs | IRKC; 10 wickets | KBC; 7 wickets | PDSC; 14 runs | OLD; 2 wickets | OSC; 47 runs | ? | ? |
| Agrani Bank (ABCC) | GCC; 26 runs | UDC; 19 runs | ASC; 6 wickets | IRKC; 35 runs | KBC; 8 wickets | PDSC; 7 wickets | OLD; 17 runs | ? | ? |
| Gulshan Cricket Club (GCC) | ABCC; 25 runs | PDSC; 7 wickets | UDC; 7 wickets | OLD; 4 wickets | ASC; 5 wickets | OSC; 2 wickets | IRKC; 1 run | ? | ? |
| Orient Sporting Club (OSC) | ASC; 6 wickets | IRKC; 1 wickets | KBC; 6 wickets | PDSC; 9 wickets | OLD; 4 wickets | GCC; 2 wickets | KSKS; 47 runs | ? | ? |
| Azad Sporting Club (ASC) | OSC; 6 wickets | KSKS; 8 runs | ABCC; 6 wickets | UDC; 141 runs | GCC; 5 wickets | IRKC; 3 wickets | KBC; 5 wickets | ? | ? |
| Old DOHS (OLD) | IRKC; 24 runs | KBC; 5 wickets | PDSC; 37 runs | GCC; 4 wickets | OSC; 4 wickets | KSKS; 2 wickets | ABCC; 17 runs | ? | ? |
| Prime Doleshwar (PDSC) | KBC; 4 wickets | GCC; 7 wickets | OLD; 37 runs | OSC; 9 wickets | KSKS; 14 runs | ABCC; 7 wickets | UDC; 6 wickets | ? | ? |
| Kakrail Boys Club (KBC) | PDSC; 4 wickets | OLD; 5 wickets | OSC; 6 wickets | KSKS; 7 wickets | ABCC; 8 wickets | UDC; 7 wickets | ASC; 5 wickets | ? | ? |
| Indira Road KC (IRKC) | OLD; 24 runs | OSC; 1 wickets | KSKS; 10 wickets | ABCC; 35 runs | UDC; 100 runs | ASC; 3 wickets | GCC; 1 run | ? | ? |
| Udayachal Club (UDC) | KSKS; 8 wickets | ABCC; 19 runs | GCC; 7 wickets | ASC; 141 runs | IRKC; 100 runs | KKC; 7 wickets | PDSC; 6 wickets | ? | ? |

| Team's results→ | Won | Tied | Lost | N/R |

=== Group B ===
| Pos | Team | Pld | W | L | T | NR | Pts | NRR |
|---|---|---|---|---|---|---|---|---|
| 1 | Uttara Cricket Club | 9 | 7 | 2 | 0 | 0 | 14 | 0.067 |
| 2 | Lalmatia Club | 9 | 6 | 3 | 0 | 0 | 12 | 1.021 |
| 3 | Dhaka Leopards | 9 | 6 | 3 | 0 | 0 | 12 | 0.241 |
| 4 | Kalindi Krira Chakra | 9 | 6 | 3 | 0 | 0 | 12 | 0.218 |
| 5 | Kala Bagan Krira Chakra | 9 | 5 | 4 | 0 | 0 | 10 | 0.587 |
| 6 | Sheikh Jamal Cricketers | 9 | 4 | 5 | 0 | 0 | 8 | −0.421 |
| 7 | Surjo Torun Club | 9 | 3 | 6 | 0 | 0 | 6 | −0.018 |
| 8 | Dhaka Spartans Cricket Club | 9 | 3 | 6 | 0 | 0 | 6 | −0.469 |
| 9 | Dhaka Assets | 9 | 3 | 6 | 0 | 0 | 6 | −0.667 |
| 10 | Axiom Cricketers | 9 | 2 | 7 | 0 | 0 | 4 | −0.542 |

Source: Cricheroes

The four top-ranked teams will qualify for the
Advance to Super League
The two Bottom-ranked teams will qualify for the
Advance to Relegation League

==== Match Summary ====
Below is a summary of results for each team's nine regular season matches in chronological order. A team's opponent for any given match is listed above the margin of victory/defeat.

| Team | 1 | 2 | 3 | 4 | 5 | 6 | 7 | 8 | 9 |
|---|---|---|---|---|---|---|---|---|---|
| Dhaka Leopards(DLP) | STC; 6 wickets | AXC; 65 runs | DAS; 69 runs | LMC; 6 wickets | KKC; 76 runs | DSSC; 3 wickets | ? | ? | ? |
| Surjo Torun Club (STC) | DLP; 6 wickets | DSCC; 57 runs | AXC; 4 wickets | SJC; 161 runs | DAS; 9 wickets | KBKC; 8 wickets | ? | ? | ? |
| Dhaka Assets (DAS) | KBKC; 128 runs | UCC; 4 wickets | DLP; 69 runs | AXC; 7 wickets | STC; 9 wickets | LMC; 7 wickets | ? | ? | ? |
| Lalmatia Club (LMC) | SJC; 23 runs | KBKC; 5 wickets | UCC; 171 runs | DLP; 6 wickets | AXM; 9 wickets | DAS; 7 wickets | ? | ? | ? |
| Kalabagan (KBKC) | DAS; 128 runs | LMC; 5 wickets | KKC; 4 runs | DSCC; 143 runs | SJC; 9 wickets | STC; 8 wickets | ? | ? | ? |
| Kalindi Krira Chakra (KKC) | DSCC; 2 wickets | SJC; 20 runs | KBKC; 4 runs | UCC; 1 wickets | DLP; 76 runs | AXC; 7 wickets | ? | ? | ? |
| Uttara Cricket Club (UCC) | AXM; 75 runs | DAS; 4 wickets | LMC; 171 runs | KKC; 1 wickets | DSCC; 5 wickets | SJC; 2 wickets | ? | ? | ? |
| Dhaka Spartans Cricket Club (DSCC) | KKC; 2 wickets | STC; 57 runs | SJC; 32 runs | KBKC; 143 runs | UCC; 5 wickets | DLP; 3 wickets | ? | ? | ? |
| Sheikh Jamal Cricketers (SJC) | LMC; 23 runs | KKC; 20 runs | DSCC; 32 runs | STC; 161 runs | KBKC; 9 wickets | UCC; 2 wickets | ? | ? | ? |
| Axiom Cricketers (AXC) | UCC; 75 runs | DLP; 65 runs | STC; 4 wickets | DAS; 7 wickets | LMC; 9 wickets | KKC; 7 wickets | ? | ? | ? |

| Team's results→ | Won | Tied | Lost | N/R |

== Relegation League ==
Relegation League

| Pos | Team | Pld | W | L | T | NR | Pts | NRR |
|---|---|---|---|---|---|---|---|---|
| 1 | Axiom Cricketers | 3 | 3 | 0 | 0 | 0 | 6 | — |
| 2 | Dhaka Assets R | 3 | 2 | 1 | 0 | 0 | 4 | — |
| 3 | Indira Road Krira Chakra R | 3 | 1 | 2 | 0 | 0 | 2 | — |
| 4 | Udayachal Club R | 3 | 0 | 3 | 0 | 0 | 0 | — |

Source: Cricheroes

Team relegated to the 2024–25 Dhaka Second Division Cricket League

=== Match Summary ===
Below is a summary of results for each team's nine regular season matches in chronological order. A team's opponent for any given match is listed above the margin of victory/defeat.

| Team | 1 | 2 | 3 |
|---|---|---|---|
| Axiom Cricketers | 2 | 4 | 6 |
| Dhaka Assets | 0 | 2 | 4 |
| Indira Road Krira Chakra | 2 | 2 | 2 |
| Udayachal Club | 0 | 0 | 0 |

| Team's results→ | Won | Tied | Lost | N/R |

== Super League ==
Point Table

| Pos | Team | Pld | W | L | T | NR | Pts | NRR |
|---|---|---|---|---|---|---|---|---|
| 1 | Gulshan Cricket Club C | 7 | 6 | 1 | 0 | 0 | 12 | 15.510 |
| 2 | Agrani Bank CC | 7 | 6 | 1 | 0 | 0 | 12 | 11.560 |
| 3 | Uttara Cricket Club | 7 | 4 | 3 | 0 | 0 | 8 | 4.444 |
| 4 | Khelaghar SKS | 7 | 3 | 3 | 1 | 0 | 7 | 1.090 |
| 5 | Dhaka Leopards | 7 | 2 | 3 | 2 | 0 | 6 | −1.574 |
| 6 | Orient Sporting Club | 7 | 2 | 4 | 1 | 0 | 5 | −3.148 |
| 7 | Kalindi Krira Chakra | 7 | 2 | 5 | 0 | 0 | 4 | −13.742 |
| 8 | Lalmatia Club | 7 | 1 | 6 | 0 | 0 | 2 | −17.750 |

Source: Cricheroes

Promoted to 2024–25 Dhaka Premier Division Cricket League.

=== Match Summary ===
Below is a summary of results for each team's nine regular season matches in chronological order. A team's opponent for any given match is listed above the margin of victory/defeat.

| Team | 1 | 2 | 3 | 4 | 5 | 6 | 7 |
|---|---|---|---|---|---|---|---|
| Agrani Bank CC | 2 | 4 | 6 | 8 | 10 | 12 | 12 |
| Dhaka Leopards | 0 | 0 | 0 | 1 | 2 | 4 | 6 |
| Gulshan Cricket Club | 2 | 2 | 4 | 6 | 8 | 10 | 12 |
| Kalindi Krira Chakra | 0 | 2 | 4 | 4 | 4 | 4 | 4 |
| Khelaghar SKS | 0 | 2 | 2 | 3 | 5 | 7 | 7 |
| Lalmatia Club | 0 | 0 | 0 | 0 | 0 | 0 | 2 |
| Orient Sporting Club | 2 | 0 | 0 | 0 | 3 | 3 | 5 |
| Uttara Cricket Club | 2 | 4 | 6 | 8 | 8 | 8 | 8 |

| Team's results→ | Won | Tied | Lost | N/R |
