= 2026 Dhaka Premier Division Cricket League =

Cricket tournament

- Dates: 4 May 2026 – 13 June 2026
- Administrator: Bangladesh Cricket Board
- Cricket format: List A
- Tournament format: Round-robin
- Champions: Mohammedan
- Runners-up: Abahani Limited
- Participants: 12
- Matches: 66

The 2026 Dhaka Premier Division Cricket League (DPDCL) was the 12th edition of the Dhaka Premier Division Cricket League, a List A cricket competition in Bangladesh. It was contested by 12 club teams. The tournament began on May 4 and finished on June 13. Its official title was "Walton Smart Fridge Dhaka Premier Division Cricket League 2025–26".

== Teams and format ==
The competition was in round-robin format. The lowest two teams would be relegated to the Dhaka First Division Cricket League. This was a change from the format up to and including the 2024–25 season, when the top six played in a second round-robin to determine the winner, and the bottom three played each other to determine which two teams should be relegated. The competing teams were:

- Abahani Limited
- Agrani Bank Cricket Club
- Bashundhara Strikers
- Brothers Union
- City Club
- Dhaka Leopards
- Gazi Group Cricketers
- Gulshan Cricket Club
- Legends of Rupganj
- Mohammedan Sporting Club
- Prime Bank Cricket Club
- Rupganj Tigers Cricket Club

City Club and Dhaka Leopards were the teams promoted from the previous season's First Division. Bashundhara Strikers had previously competed as Sheikh Jamal Dhanmondi Club, and then as Dhanmondi Club.

== League points table ==
Pos	Team	Pld	W	L	T	NR	Pts	NRR
1	Mohammedan	11	9	2	0	0	18	2.294
2	Abahani Limited	11	8	3	0	0	16	1.611
3	Prime Bank	11	8	3	0	0	16	0.770
4	Legends of Rupganj	11	7	4	0	0	14	0.672
5	Dhaka Leopards	11	6	5	0	0	12	0.387
6	Agrani Bank	11	6	5	0	0	12	−0.631
7	Bashundhara Strikers	11	5	6	0	0	10	−0.638
8	City Club	11	4	6	0	1	9	−0.111
9	Gazi Group Cricketers	11	4	6	0	1	9	0.109
10	Rupganj Tigers	11	3	7	1	0	7	−1.375
11	Gulshan Cricket Club	11	3	7	1	0	7	−1.578
12	Brothers Union	11	1	10	0	0	0	−1.672

Source: ESPNCricinfo

When two teams are tied on points, the head-to-head winner is placed higher on the table.

Note: Brothers Union were disqualified and relegated after the players refused to play in the ninth-round match owing to a dispute with the team management.

== Match summary ==
Below is a summary of results for each team's nine regular season matches in chronological order. A team's opponent for any given match is listed above the margin of victory/defeat.

Team	League Stage											
Team	1	2	3	4	5	6	7	8	9	10	11	Pos
Abahani Limited (ABL)	TBD ?	TBD ?	TBD ?	TBD ?	TBD ?	TBD ?	TBD ?	TBD ?	TBD ?	TBD ?	TBD ?	-
Agrani Bank Cricket Club (ABCC)	TBD ?	TBD ?	TBD ?	TBD ?	TBD ?	TBD ?	TBD ?	TBD ?	TBD ?	TBD ?	TBD ?	-
Bashundhara Strikers (BS)	TBD ?	TBD ?	TBD ?	TBD ?	TBD ?	TBD ?	TBD ?	TBD ?	TBD ?	TBD ?	TBD ?	-
Brothers Union (BU)	TBD ?	TBD ?	TBD ?	TBD ?	TBD ?	TBD ?	TBD ?	TBD ?	TBD ?	TBD ?	TBD ?	-
City Club (CC)	TBD ?	TBD ?	TBD ?	TBD ?	TBD ?	TBD ?	TBD ?	TBD ?	TBD ?	TBD ?	TBD ?	-
Dhaka Leopards (DLP)	TBD ?	TBD ?	TBD ?	TBD ?	TBD ?	TBD ?	TBD ?	TBD ?	TBD ?	TBD ?	TBD ?	-
Gazi Group Cricketers (GGC)	TBD ?	TBD ?	TBD ?	TBD ?	TBD ?	TBD ?	TBD ?	TBD ?	TBD ?	TBD ?	TBD ?	-
Gulshan Cricket Club (GCC)	TBD ?	TBD ?	TBD ?	TBD ?	TBD ?	TBD ?	TBD ?	TBD ?	TBD ?	TBD ?	TBD ?	-
Legends of Rupganj (LoR)	TBD ?	TBD ?	TBD ?	TBD ?	TBD ?	TBD ?	TBD ?	TBD ?	TBD ?	TBD ?	TBD ?	-
Mohammedan SC (MSC)	TBD ?	TBD ?	TBD ?	TBD ?	TBD ?	TBD ?	TBD ?	TBD ?	TBD ?	TBD ?	TBD ?	-
Prime Bank Cricket Club (PBCC)	TBD ?	TBD ?	TBD ?	TBD ?	TBD ?	TBD ?	TBD ?	TBD ?	TBD ?	TBD ?	TBD ?	-
Rupganj Tigers Cricket Club (RTCC)	TBD ?	TBD ?	TBD ?	TBD ?	TBD ?	TBD ?	TBD ?	TBD ?	TBD ?	TBD ?	TBD ?	-

Team's results→	TBA	Tied	Lost	N/R

== League stage ==
=== Round 1 ===
Match 1
4 May 2026
9:00 am

Abahani Limited	v	Dhaka Leopards

Bashundhara Sports City Complex, Dhaka

Match 2
4 May 2026
9:00 am

Mohammedan Sporting Club	v	City Club

Match 3
4 May 2026
9:00 am

Gazi Group Cricketers	v	Brothers Union

Match 4
4 May 2026
9:00 am

Legends of Rupganj	v	Rupganj Tigers Cricket Club

Match 5
4 May 2026
9:00 am

Bashundhara Strikers	v	Gulshan Cricket Club

Match 6
4 May 2026
9:00 am

Prime Bank Cricket Club	v	Agrani Bank Cricket Club

=== Round 2 ===
Match 7
4 May 2026
9:00 am

Abahani Limited	v	City Club

Bashundhara Sports City Complex, Dhaka

Match 2
7 May 2026
9:00 am

Mohammedan Sporting Club	v	Brothers Union

Match 9
7 May 2026
9:00 am

Gazi Group Cricketers	v	Bashundhara Strikers

Match 10
7 May 2026
9:00 am

Legends of Rupganj	v	Prime Bank Cricket Club

Match 11
7 May 2026
9:00 am

Dhaka Leopards	v	Gulshan Cricket Club

Match 12
7 May 2026
9:00 am

City Club	v	Agrani Bank Cricket Club
