= 2022–23 Dhaka Third Division Cricket League =

Cricket tournament

- Dates: 7 October 2022 – 13 November 2022
- Administrator(s): Bangladesh Cricket Board
- Cricket format: 50 over
- Tournament format(s): Round-robin
- Champions: Banani Cricket Club
- Participants: 20
- Matches: 124

The 2022–23 Dhaka Third Division Cricket League is the 2022–23 season of Dhaka Third Division Cricket League. This is a 50 over cricket competition that is being held in Bangladesh. It was played by 20 club teams from 07 October to 13 November 2022.

Banani Cricket Club clinched the tournament and became Champions. Champion team will be promoted to 2023–24 Dhaka Second Division Cricket League

== Teams ==
Teams in the tournament

- Banani Cricket Club
- Dhaka Cricketers
- Dhaka United Sporting Club
- Dhrubo Sporting Club
- Gulshan Youth Club Ltd
- Kamrangirchar Sporting Club
- Kathalbagan Green Crescent Club
- Narayanganj Cricket Academy Narayanganj
- Nakhalpara Cricketers
- Mohakhali Cricket Academy
- Old Dhaka Cricketers
- Progoti Sheba Sangha
- Regular Sporting Club
- Sk. Russel Krira Chakra
- Raising Star Cricket Club Dhaka
- Sports Wing
- Tejgaon Cricket Academy
- Udity Club
- Uttaran Krira Chakra
- Winger Cricketers
