= 2023–24 Dhaka Third Division Cricket League =

Cricket tournament

- Dates: 28 September 2023 – 8 November 2023
- Administrator(s): Bangladesh Cricket Board
- Cricket format: 50 over
- Tournament format(s): Round-robin
- Champions: Gulshan Youth Club
- Participants: 20
- Matches: 124

The 2023–24 Dhaka Third Division Cricket League is the 2023–24 season of Dhaka Third Division Cricket League, a 50 over cricket competition held in Bangladesh. It was played by 20 club teams from 28 September to 8 November 2023.

Gulshan Youth Club clinched the tournament and became Champion. Champion team will be promoted to 2024–25 Dhaka Second Division Cricket League

== Teams ==
- Dhanmondi Cricket Club
- Gulshan Youth Club
- Kathalbagan Green Crescent Club
- Mohakhali Cricket Academy
- Nakhalpara Cricketers
- Pacific Cricket Club
- Old Dhaka Cricketers
- Progoti Sheba Sangha
- Paradise Sporting Club
- Narayanganj Cricket Academy
- Rangers Cricket Academy
- Sk. Russel Krira Chakra
- Regular Sporting Club
- Raising Star Cricket Club Dhaka
- Talent Hunt Cricket Academy
- Tejgaon Cricket Academy
- Udity Club
- Vikings Cricket Academy
- Winger Cricketers
- Uttaran Krira Chakra
