= 2019–20 Dhaka Premier Division Cricket League =

Cricket tournament

- Official Logo of Dhaka Premier Division Cricket League 2019–20
- Dates: 15 – 16 March 2020
- Administrator: Bangladesh Cricket Board
- Cricket format: List A
- Tournament format: Round-robin
- Participants: 12
- Matches: 84

The 2019–20 Dhaka Premier Division Cricket League was an edition of the Dhaka Premier Division Cricket League, a List A cricket competition that was held in Bangladesh. It was the seventh edition of the tournament with List A status, although almost 35 seasons had been played before achieving the status. The tournament started on 15 March 2020, and was scheduled to finish on 8 May 2020. Ahead of the tournament, a total of 137 players were transferred. Abahani Limited were the defending champions.

Despite the COVID-19 pandemic, the tournament started as planned. However, after the conclusion of matches played on 15 and 16 March 2020, the Bangladesh Cricket Board (BCB) postponed all further matches until 31 March 2020 at the earliest due to the pandemic. The postponement was initially extended to 14 April 2020, with the tournament postponed indefinitely. At the end of May 2020, Nizamuddin Chowdhury, CEO of the BCB, said they were waiting on the government's advice on the resumption of cricket in the country. On 2 June 2020, the Cricket Committee of Dhaka Metropolis said that they had no issue in resuming the tournament.

In July 2020, the BCB looked at the possibility of restarting the tournament in September 2020, playing all the matches at two local hubs. In August 2020, the BCB's president Nazmul Hassan was also looking at a possible window ahead of the national team's then scheduled tour to Sri Lanka to complete the tournament. However, in September 2020, the international tour to Sri Lanka was postponed, after both boards could not agree on the quarantine requirements for the series. After the news of the international tour being cancelled, the BCB were again looking at the possibility of completing the domestic tournament. In October 2020, BCB director Khaled Mahmud confirmed that it would not be possible to finish the tournament in 2020. In March 2021, the tournament was abandoned and replaced by the 2021 Dhaka Premier Division Twenty20 Cricket League.

== Teams ==
The following teams competed in the tournament:

- Abahani Limited
- Brothers Union
- Gazi Group Cricketers
- Khelaghar Samaj Kallyan Samity
- Legends of Rupganj
- Mohammedan Sporting Club
- Old DOHS Sports Club
- Partex Sporting Club
- Prime Bank Cricket Club
- Prime Doleshwar Sporting Club
- Sheikh Jamal Dhanmondi Club
- Shinepukur Cricket Club

== Fixtures ==
=== Round robin ===
==== Round 1 ====
15 March 2020
Scorecard

Abahani Limited; 289/7 (50 overs)	v	Partex Sporting Club; 208 (48.4 overs)
Mushfiqur Rahim 127 (124); Jaynul Islam 3/28 (10 overs)		Nazmul Hossain Milon 53 (63); Mehedi Hasan Rana 4/56 (9.4 overs)

Abahani Limited won by 81 runs
Sher-e-Bangla National Cricket Stadium, Mirpur
Umpires: Mahfuzur Rahman and Masudur Rahman
Player of the match: Mushfiqur Rahim (Abahani Limited)

- Abahani Limited won the toss and elected to bat.
- Abbas Musa (Partex Sporting Club) made his List A debut.

15 March 2020
Scorecard

Old DOHS Sports Club; 230 (49 overs)	v	Legends of Rupganj; 205 (50 overs)
Anisul Islam Emon 59 (76); Sohag Gazi 3/54 (10 overs)		Pinak Ghosh 53 (93); Abdur Rashid 3/35 (9 overs)

Old DOHS Sports Club won by 25 runs
Bangladesh Krira Shikkha Protisthan No 4 Ground, Savar
Umpires: Ali Arman and Imran Parvez
Player of the match: Avishek Das (Old DOHS Sports Club)

- Legends of Rupganj won the toss and elected to field.
- Avishek Das, Aliss Islam, Pritom Kumar and Gazi Sohel (Old DOHS Sports Club) all made their List A debuts.

15 March 2020
Scorecard

Prime Doleshwar Sporting Club; 238/7 (50 overs)	v	Brothers Union; 230 (49.4 overs)
Taibur Rahman 110* (94); Saqlain Sajib 2/27 (7 overs)		Junaid Siddique 97 (125); Rejaur Rahman Raja 4/36 (9.4 overs)

Prime Doleshwar Sporting Club won by 8 runs
Khan Shaheb Osman Ali Stadium, Fatullah
Umpires: Shafiuddin Ahmed and Sharfuddoula
Player of the match: Taibur Rahman (Prime Doleshwar Sporting Club)

- Brothers Union won the toss and elected to field.

16 March 2020
Scorecard

Sheikh Jamal Dhanmondi Club; 276/9 (50 overs)	v	Khelaghar Samaj Kallyan Samity; 221/9 (50 overs)
Shykat Ali 83 (79); Ifran Hossain 4/43 (10 overs)		Jahurul Islam 51 (78); Suhrawadi Shuvo 2/26 (7 overs)

Sheikh Jamal Dhanmondi Club won by 55 runs
Bangladesh Krira Shikkha Protisthan No 4 Ground, Savar
Umpires: Tanvir Ahmed and Gazi Sohel
Player of the match: Shykat Ali (Sheikh Jamal Dhanmondi Club)

- Khelaghar Samaj Kallyan Samity won the toss and elected to field.

16 March 2020
Scorecard

Prime Bank Cricket Club; 251/6 (50 overs)	v	Gazi Group Cricketers; 242/9 (50 overs)
Rony Talukdar 79 (104); Mahmudullah 3/53 (10 overs)		Mahedi Hasan 56* (49); Nahidul Islam 2/30 (5 overs)

Prime Bank Cricket Club won by 9 runs
Sher-e-Bangla National Cricket Stadium, Mirpur
Umpires: Masudur Rahman and Sharfuddoula
Player of the match: Nahidul Islam (Prime Bank Cricket Club)

- Gazi Group Cricketers won the toss and elected to field.

16 March 2020
Scorecard

Mohammedan Sporting Club; 257/8 (50 overs)	v	Shinepukur Cricket Club; 258/5 (49.3 overs)
Mahmudul Hasan 58 (63); Tanvir Islam 2/44 (10 overs)		Tanzid Hasan 59 (77); Mahmudul Hasan 1/20 (4 overs)

Shinepukur Cricket Club won by 5 wickets
Khan Shaheb Osman Ali Stadium, Fatullah
Umpires: Imran Parvez and Mahfuzur Rahman
Player of the match: Tanzid Hasan (Shinepukur Cricket Club)

- Mohammedan Sporting Club won the toss and elected to bat.

==== Round 2 ====
18 March 2020
Scorecard

Abahani Limited	v	Old DOHS Sports Club

Sheikh Kamal International Stadium, Cox's Bazar

18 March 2020
Scorecard

Legends of Rupganj	v	Brothers Union

Sheikh Kamal International Cricket Stadium Academy Ground, Cox's Bazar

18 March 2020
Scorecard

Prime Doleshwar Sporting Club	v	Khelaghar Samaj Kallyan Samity

Zohur Ahmed Chowdhury Stadium, Chittagong

20 March 2020
Scorecard

Sheikh Jamal Dhanmondi Club	v	Gazi Group Cricketers

Sheikh Kamal International Stadium, Cox's Bazar

20 March 2020
Scorecard

Prime Bank Cricket Club	v	Shinepukur Cricket Club

Sheikh Kamal International Cricket Stadium Academy Ground, Cox's Bazar

20 March 2020
Scorecard

Mohammedan Sporting Club	v	Partex Sporting Club

Zohur Ahmed Chowdhury Stadium, Chittagong

==== Round 3 ====
24 March 2020
Scorecard

Abahani Limited	v	Brothers Union

Sheikh Kamal International Stadium, Cox's Bazar

24 March 2020
Scorecard

Legends of Rupganj	v	Khelaghar Samaj Kallyan Samity

Zohur Ahmed Chowdhury Stadium, Chittagong

24 March 2020
Scorecard

Prime Doleshwar Sporting Club	v	Gazi Group Cricketers

Sheikh Kamal International Cricket Stadium Academy Ground, Cox's Bazar

25 March 2020
Scorecard

Sheikh Jamal Dhanmondi Club	v	Shinepukur Cricket Club

Sheikh Kamal International Stadium, Cox's Bazar

25 March 2020
Scorecard

Prime Bank Cricket Club	v	Mohammedan Sporting Club

Zohur Ahmed Chowdhury Stadium, Chittagong

25 March 2020
Scorecard

Old DOHS Sports Club	v	Partex Sporting Club

Sheikh Kamal International Cricket Stadium Academy Ground, Cox's Bazar
