= Avishek =

Avishek is a masculine given name which may refer to:

- Avishek Das (born 2001), Bangladeshi cricketer
- Avishek Karthik (fl. 2007–present), Indian actor in Tamil language films
- Avishek Mitra (born 1992), Bangladeshi cricketer
- Avishek Sinha (born 1984), Indian cricketer
