= 2022–23 Dhaka Second Division Cricket League =

Cricket tournament

- Dates: 18 November 2022 – 01 January 2023
- Administrator(s): Bangladesh Cricket Board
- Cricket format: 50 over
- Tournament format(s): Round-robin
- Champions: Gulshan Cricket Club
- Participants: 24
- Matches: 166

The 2022–23 Dhaka Second Division Cricket League is a 2022–23 season of Dhaka Second Division Cricket League. This is a 50 over cricket competition that is being held in Bangladesh. It is being played by the 24 club teams. The tournament started on 18 November 2022 to 1 January 2023.

Gulshan Cricket Club clinched the tournament and become Champion. Champion team will be promoted to 2023–24 Dhaka First Division Cricket League

== Teams ==
- Amirun Srity Cricket Academy Dhaka
- Bangladesh Krira Shikhha Pratistan
- Amber Sporting Club
- Bangladesh Police Cricket Club
- Bangladesh Boys Club
- Baridhara Dazzlers
- Dhaka Mariner Youngs Club
- Dhaka Wanderers Club
- Dhanmondi Progoti Sangha
- Dhaka Cricket Academy
- Fear Fighters Sporting Club
- Gulshan Cricket Club
- Gopibagh Friends Association
- Jatrabari Krira Chakra
- Mirpur Boys Cricket Club
- Nawabganj Cricket Coaching Academy
- North Bengal Cricket Academy
- Rayer Bazar Athletic Club
- Rupali Bank Krira Parishad
- Sadharan Bima Krira Sangstha
- Talent Hunt Cricket Academy
- Young Pegasus Club-A
- Surjo Torun Club
- Victoria Sporting Club
