= 2022–23 Dhaka First Division Cricket League =

Cricket tournament

- Dates: 6 January 2023 – 21 February 2023
- Administrator: Bangladesh Cricket Board
- Cricket format: 50 over
- Tournament format: Round-robin
- Champions: Gazi Tyres Cricket Academy
- Participants: 20
- Matches: 124
- Most runs: Ashfak Ahmed Rohan (Orient Sporting) (551)
- Most wickets: Md Aridul Islam Akash (Khelaghar Samaj Kallyan Samity) (37)

The 2022–23 Dhaka First Division Cricket League is a 2022–23 season of Dhaka First Division Cricket League. This is a 50 over cricket competition that is being held in Bangladesh. It is being played by the 20 club teams. The tournament started on 6 January 2023 to 21 February 2023. Champion team will be promoted to 2023–24 Dhaka Premier Division Cricket League

== Teams ==
- Axiom Cricketers
- Azim Cricket Club
- Gazi Tyres Cricket Academy
- Dhaka Assets
- Azad Sporting Club
- Khelaghar Samaj Kallyan Samity
- Kala Bagan Krira Chakra
- Kakrail Boys Club
- Indira Road Krira Chakra
- Kalindi Krira Chakra
- Mohammadpur Cricket Club
- Old DOHS Sports Club
- Orient Sporting Club
- Partex Sporting Club
- Lalmatia Club
- Prime Doleshwar Sporting Club
- Purbachal Sporting Club
- Sheikh Jamal Cricketers
- Uttara Cricket Club
- Udayachal Club

== League Stage ==
Source: Cricheros.in

Group A

Teams	Pld	W	L	NR	Pts	NRR
Old DOHS Sports Club	9	6	2	1	13	0.816
Kala Bagan Krira Chakra	9	6	2	1	13	0.777
Sheikh Jamal Cricketers	9	5	3	1	11	0.453
Azim Cricket Club	9	4	4		9	0.537
Khelaghar Samaj Kallyan Samity	9	4	4	1	9	0.180
Kakrail Boys Club	9	4	5	0	8	0.275
Indira Road Krira Chakra	9	4	5	0	8	-0.428
Lalmatia Club	9	3	5	1	7	-0.669
Axiom Cricketers	9	3	5	1	7	-0.849
Udayachal Club	9	2	6	1	5	-1.179

Teams qualified for the Super League phase of the tournament.

Teams qualified for the Relegation League play-offs phase of the tournament.

Group B

Teams	Pld	W	L	NR	Pts	NRR
Gazi Tyres Cricket Academy	9	8	1	0	16	1.183
Uttara Cricket Club	9	6	3	0	12	1.034
Prime Doleshwar Sporting Club	9	6	3	0	12	0.925
Partex Sporting Club	9	6	3	0	12	0.263
Orient Sporting Club	9	6	3	0	12	0.070
Kalindi Krira Chakra	9	4	5	0	8	-0.212
Azad Sporting Club	9	3	6	0	6	-0.346
Dhaka Assets	9	3	6	0	6	-0.792
Purbachal Sporting Club	9	2	7	0	4	-0.872
Mohammadpur Cricket Club	9	1	8	p	2	-0.942

Teams qualified for the Super League phase of the tournament.

Teams qualified for the Relegation League play-offs phase of the tournament.

== Relegation League ==
Relegation League

Team	Pld	W	L	NR	Pts	NRR
Udayachal Club	3	3	0	0	6	1.093
Purbachal Sporting Club	3	3	1	0	4	0.520
Axiom Cricketers R	3	1	3	0	2	-0.840
Mohammadpur Cricket Club R	3	0	3	0	0	–3.051

Team relegated to the 2023–24 Dhaka Second Division Cricket League

== Super League ==
Point Table

Team	Pld	W	L	NR	Pts	NRR
Gazi Tyres Cricket Academy C	7	6	1	0	12	0.905
Khelaghar Samaj Kallyan Samity	7	6	1	0	12	0.417
Partex Sporting Club	7	5	2	0	10	0.369
Orient Sporting Club	7	3	4	0	6	0.246
Uttara Cricket Club	7	3	4	0	6	0.130
Kala Bagan Krira Chakra	7	2	5	0	4	-0.708
Sheikh Jamal Cricketers	7	12	5	0	4	-0.845
Old DOHS Sports Club	7	1	6	0	2	-0.469

Promoted to 2023–24 Dhaka Premier Division Cricket League.

C = Champion
