= Pritom Kumar =

Bangladeshi cricketer

Personal information
- Born: 21 November 2001 (age 24); Joypurhat, Bangladesh
- Batting: Right-handed
- Role: Wicket-keeper

Domestic team information
- Years: Team
- 2019/20, 2021: Old DOHS Sports Club
- 2020/21-present: Rajshahi Division
- 2023/24: Fortune Barishal

Career statistics
Competition	FC	LA	T20
Matches	38	32	29
Runs scored	2,123	725	217
Batting average	35.38	24.16	10.85
100s/50s	5/9	1/3	0/0
Top score	155	108	30*
Catches/stumpings	85/18	21/4	18/5
- Source: Cricinfo, 23 April 2026

Pritom Kumar (Bengali: প্রিতম কুমার, born: 21 November 2001) is a Bangladeshi cricketer who is the captain of the Rajshahi Division in domestic cricket. He plays for the Fortune Barishal in Bangladesh Premier League. Pritom is regarded as one of Bangladesh's promising young Wicket-keeper Batter in domestic cricket, he has played in multiple Twenty20 matches around the Bangladesh.

He made his List A debut on 15 March 2020, for Old DOHS Sports Club, in the 2019–20 Dhaka Premier Division Cricket League. He made his first-class debut for Rajshahi Division in the 2020–21 National Cricket League on 22 March 2021. He made his Twenty20 debut on 31 May 2021, for Old DOHS Sports Club in the 2021 Dhaka Premier Division Twenty20 Cricket League. In November 2021, during the 2021–22 National Cricket League, Kumar scored his maiden century in first-class cricket.
