= Dhaka Third Division Cricket League =

Annual cricket tournament

- Countries: Bangladesh
- Administrator: Bangladesh Cricket Board
- Format: 50 overs
- Latest edition: 2023–24
- Next edition: 2024–25
- Tournament format: Round Robin
- Number of teams: 20

The Dhaka Third Division Cricket League is a domestic one-day cricket tournament in Bangladesh. It is the fourth tier of the Bangladeshi 50-over cricket league system. Administered by the Bangladesh Cricket Board, it is contested by 20 teams. It operates in a system of promotion and relegation with the Dhaka Second Division Cricket League. The top two teams of two super league groups are promoted to the Second Division League and replaced by the two lowest-placed/relegated teams in that division.

== List of Winners ==
- 2019–20 =
- 2020–21 =
- 2021–22 =
- 2022–23 = Banani Cricket Club
- 2023–24 = Gulshan Youth Club
- 2024–25 = Progati Sheba Sangho
- 2025–26 =
