= Gazi Sohel (cricketer) =

Bangladeshi cricketer

Personal information
- Full name: Gazi Sohel Rana Sagor
- Source: Cricinfo, 22 March 2020

Gazi Sohel is a Bangladeshi cricketer. He made his List A debut for Old DOHS Sports Club in the 2019–20 Dhaka Premier Division Cricket League on 15 March 2020.
