= 2024–25 Dhaka Second Division Cricket League =

Cricket tournament

- Dates: 1 December 2024 – 29 January 2025
- Administrator(s): Bangladesh Cricket Board
- Cricket format: 50 over
- Tournament format(s): Round-robin
- Champions: Baridhara Dazzlers
- Participants: 24
- Matches: 166
- Most runs: Seam Al Sakib Anim (742)
- Most wickets: Monirul Hoque (35)

The 2024–25 Dhaka Second Division Cricket League or Meghna Bank Dhaka Second Division Cricket League 2024–25 (for sponsorship reason) is a 2024–25 season of Dhaka Second Division Cricket League. This is a 50 over cricket competition that is being held in Bangladesh. It is being played by the 24 club teams. The tournament started on 1st December 2024 to 29 January 2025. Champion team will be promoted to 2025–26 Dhaka First Division Cricket League Amber Sporting Club is champion of previous season.

== Teams ==
- Banani Cricket Club
- Bangladesh Boys Club
- Bangladesh Krira Shikhha Pratistan
- Baridhara Dazzlers
- Dhaka Cricket Academy
- Dhaka Mariner Youngs Club
- Dhaka Wanderers Club
- Dhanmondi Progoti Sangha
- Fear Fighters Sporting Club
- Golden Eagles Sporting Club
- Gopibagh Friends Association
- Gulshan Youth Club Ltd
- Indira Road Krira Chakra
- Mirpur Boys Cricket Club
- Mohammadpur Cricket Club
- Nawabganj Cricket Coaching Academy
- North Bengal Cricket Academy
- Rayer Bazar Athletic Club
- Rupali Bank Krira Parishad
- Sadharan Bima Krira Sangstha
- Udayachal Club
- Udity Club
- Victoria Sporting Club
- Young Pegasus Club-A

== Points table ==
=== Group A ===
Pos	Team	Pld	W	L	T	NR	Pts	NRR
1	Baridhara Dazzlers	11	8	3	0	0	16	1.399
2	Dhanmondi Progoti Sangha	11	7	4	0	0	14	0.850
3	Dhaka Mariner Youngs Club	11	7	4	0	0	14	0.558
4	Indira Road Krira Chakra	11	7	4	0	0	14	0.251
5	Gulshan Youth Club Ltd	11	7	4	0	0	14	0.176
6	Fear Fighters Sporting Club	11	6	5	0	0	12	0.722
7	Rupali Bank Krira Parishad	11	6	5	0	0	12	−0.174
8	Banani Cricket Club	11	5	6	0	0	10	0.122
9	Gopibagh Friends Association	11	4	6	0	1	9	−0.634
10	Bangladesh Boys Club	11	4	6	0	1	9	−0.662
11	Victoria Sporting Club	11	2	9	0	0	4	−0.983
12	Dhaka Cricket Academy	11	2	9	0	0	4	−1.502

Source: Cricheroes
- Advanced to Super League
- Advanced to the Relegation League

=== Group B ===
Pos	Team	Pld	W	L	T	NR	Pts	NRR
1	Bangladesh Krira Shikhha Pratistan	11	9	1	0	1	19	1.773
2	Nawabganj Cricket Coaching Academy	11	8	3	0	0	16	0.525
3	Mirpur Boys Cricket Club	11	7	3	0	1	15	0.280
4	Dhaka Wanderers Club	11	7	3	0	1	15	0.256
5	Sadharan Bima Krira Sangstha	11	7	4	0	0	14	0.867
6	Udity Club	11	7	4	0	0	14	0.252
7	North Bengal Cricket Academy	11	5	6	0	0	10	−0.315
8	Mohammadpur Cricket Club	11	3	7	0	1	7	−0.262
9	Udayachal Club	11	3	7	0	1	7	−1.030
10	Young Pegasus Club-A	11	3	8	0	0	6	−0.136
11	Golden Eagles Sporting Club	11	2	8	0	1	5	−1.131
12	Rayer Bazar Athletic Club	11	2	9	0	0	4	−1.372

Source: Cricheroes
- Advanced to Super League
- Advanced to the Relegation League

=== Relegation League ===
Pos	Team	Pld	W	L	T	NR	Pts	NRR
1	Rayer Bazar Athletic Club	3	3	0	0	0	6	0.920
2	Dhaka Cricket Academy	3	1	1	1	0	3	0.812
3	Golden Eagles Sporting Club	3	1	1	1	0	3	−0.474
4	Victoria Sporting Club	3	0	3	0	0	0	−1.078

Source: Cricheroes

=== Super League A ===
Pos	Team	Pld	W	L	T	NR	Pts	NRR
1	Bangladesh Krira Shikhha Pratistan	5	3	1	0	1	7	1.939
2	Gulshan Youth Club Ltd	5	3	1	0	1	7	−0.029
3	Dhanmondi Progoti Sangha	5	2	1	0	2	6	1.289
4	Dhaka Wanderers Club	5	2	2	0	1	5	−0.893
5	Udity Club	5	1	2	0	2	4	−0.943
6	Nawabganj Cricket Coaching Academy	5	0	4	0	1	1	−1.821

Source: Cricheroes

=== Super League B ===
Pos	Team	Pld	W	L	T	NR	Pts	NRR
1	Baridhara Dazzlers (C)	5	5	0	0	0	10	2.450
2	Mirpur Boys Cricket Club	5	4	1	0	0	8	2.240
3	Indira Road Krira Chakra	5	3	2	0	0	6	0.640
4	Sadharan Bima Krira Sangstha	5	2	3	0	0	4	−1.040
5	Dhaka Mariner Youngs Club	5	1	4	0	0	2	−0.240
6	Fear Fighters Sporting Club	5	0	5	0	0	0	−2.430

Source: Cricheroes
