= Aliss Islam =

Bangladeshi cricketer (born 1996)

Personal information
- Full name: Aliss Al Islam
- Born: 12 December 1996 (age 29)
- Batting: Right-handed
- Bowling: Right-arm offbreak
- Role: Bowler

International information
- National side: Bangladesh (2026–present)
- Only ODI (cap 155): 21 October 2026 v Afghanistan
- T20I debut (cap 94): 3 October 2026 v Sri Lanka

Domestic team information
- Years: Team
- 2019: Dhaka Dynamites
- 2019–20: Khulna Tigers
- 2024: Comilla Victorians
- 2025: Chittagong Kings

Career statistics
Competition	LA	T20
Matches	17	58
Runs scored	75	85
Batting average	37.50	9.44
100s/50s	–	–
Top score	24	20*
Balls bowled	824	1260
Wickets	32	59
Bowling average	17.56	22.86
5 wickets in innings	1	0
10 wickets in match	–	–
Best bowling	6/21	4/17
Catches/stumpings	7/–	13/–
- Source: Cricinfo, 18 June 2026

Aliss Al Islam (born 12 December 1996) is a Bangladeshi cricketer. He made his Twenty20 debut for the Dhaka Dynamites in the 2018–19 Bangladesh Premier League on 11 January 2019. On his T20 debut, he took a hat-trick against the Rangpur Riders, finishing with 4-26, and was named the player of the match. However, two days after the match, he was reported for a suspect bowling action. In November 2019, he was selected to play for the Khulna Tigers in the 2019–20 Bangladesh Premier League.

He made his List A debut on 15 March 2020, for Old DOHS Sports Club, in the 2019–20 Dhaka Premier Division Cricket League.
