= Rakibul Islam =

Bangladeshi cricketer (born 1997)

Personal information
- Born: 2 December 1997 (age 28); Madaripur, Bangladesh
- Nickname: Raja
- Height: 5 ft 6 in (1.68 m)
- Batting: Right-handed
- Bowling: Right-arm off-break
- Role: Batsman

Domestic team information
- Years: Team
- 2021–present: Old DOHS Sports Club

Career statistics
Competition	T20
Matches	2
Runs scored	2
Batting average	–
100s/50s	0/0
Top score	2*
Catches/stumpings	1/–
- Source: ESPNcricinfo

Rakibul Islam (born 2 December 1997) is a Bangladeshi cricketer, who bats right-handed and bowls right-arm off-breaks. He currently represents the Old DOHS Sports Club in domestic T20 cricket.

In May 2021, he was named in the Old DOHS Sports Club's squad for the 2021 Dhaka Premier Division Twenty20 Cricket League. He made his Twenty20 debut for the Old DOHS Sports Club during the rain-affected second match of the tournament.
