= Banani DOHS =

Neighborhood in Dhaka, Bangladesh

Coordinates: 23.794°N 90.399°E

- Neighborhood
- Interactive map of Banani DOHS
- Country: Bangladesh
- City: Dhaka
- Time zone: BST

Banani DOHS, also known as "Old DOHS", is a neighborhood of Dhaka, located in Banani. It was created under the Defense Officers Housing Scheme (DOHS) of the Government of Bangladesh. The neighborhood falls under the Jurisdiction of Bhashantek Police Station. The area is governed by the DOHS parishad.

== Notable places ==
- Banani (Old) DOHS Mosque.
- Banani DOHS Community Centre.
- Old DOHS Sports Club - a professional sport-based club based in the area.

== Notable residents ==
- Muhammed Zafar Iqbal - writer, activist, scientist, and university professor
- Majid-ul-Haq - Army general and former government minister
- Mosaddek Ali Falu - politician and businessman
- Wasfia Nazreen - Bangladeshi woman mountaineer.
- Tamim Iqbal - Bangladeshi cricketer
