= Avishek Das =

Bangladeshi cricketer (born 2001)

Personal information
- Full name: Avishek Das Aronno
- Born: 5 September 2001 (age 25); Narail District, Khulna Division, Bangladesh
- Nickname: Aronno
- Batting: Right-handed
- Bowling: Right-arm medium

Domestic team information
- Years: Team
- 2025-present: Khulna Division

Career statistics
Competition	LA	T20
Matches	1	2
Runs scored	14	27
Batting average	14.00	-
100s/50s	0/0	0/0
Top score	14	27*
Balls bowled	54	24
Wickets	3	0
Bowling average	14.66	-
5 wickets in innings	0	0
10 wickets in match	0	0
Best bowling	3/44	-
Catches/stumpings	0/0	0/0
Medal record
Men's Cricket
Representing Bangladesh
ICC U-19 World Cup
Winner	2020 South Africa
- Source: Cricinfo, 10 October 2025

Avishek Das (born 5 September 2001) is a Bangladeshi cricketer. He made his List A debut on 15 March 2020, for Old DOHS Sports Club, in the 2019–20 Dhaka Premier Division Cricket League. Prior to his List A debut, he was named in Bangladesh's squad for the 2020 Under-19 Cricket World Cup.
