= Robiul Hoque =

Bangladeshi cricketer (born 1997)

Personal information
- Born: 4 January 1997 (age 29); Saidpur, Bangladesh
- Source: ESPNcricinfo, 24 November 2018

Robiul Hoque (born 4 January 1997) is a Bangladeshi cricketer. He made his first-class debut for Central Zone in the 2018–19 Bangladesh Cricket League on 21 November 2018. He made his List A debut on 15 March 2022, for Prime Bank Cricket Club in the 2021–22 Dhaka Premier Division Cricket League.
