= Dhaka Leopards =

Bangladeshi List A cricket team

Personnel
- Captain: Mohammad Mithun

Dhaka Leopards are a Bangladeshi cricket team that has played List A cricket in the Dhaka Premier Division Cricket League in 2022–23 and 2025–26.

Dhaka Leopards competed for the first time in the 2022–23 Dhaka Premier Division Cricket League. Captained by Junaid Siddique, they played their first match against the previous season's premiers, Sheikh Jamal Dhanmondi Club, on 15 March 2023, losing by eight wickets. They did not achieve their first victory until the ninth round, when they beat Shinepukur Cricket Club by 76 runs, Raihan Uddin taking 6 for 30, the first time any of their bowlers had taken more than three wickets in an innings. In their next match two days later, which they lost by one run to Legends of Rupganj, Umar Amin scored their first century, scoring 128 not out. They won only one of their 13 matches and finished at the bottom of the league table, and were thus relegated for the 2023–24 season.

Dhaka Leopards finished in the top two in the Dhaka First Division Cricket League in 2024–25, thus earning promotion back to the Premier League for 2025–26. In their first match in the 2025–26 competition, they defeated the champions of the previous three seasons, Abahani, by five wickets.

== List A record ==
- 2022–23: 13 matches, won 1, finished 12th (last)
- 2025–26: 11 matches, won 6, finished fifth
