= Dhaka First Division Cricket League =

Annual cricket tournament

- Countries: Bangladesh
- Administrator: Bangladesh Cricket Board
- Format: 50 overs
- Latest edition: 2023–24
- Next edition: 2024–25
- Tournament format: Round Robin
- Number of teams: 20
- Current champion: Gulshan Cricket Club
- Relegation to: Dhaka Second Division Cricket League

The Dhaka First Division Cricket League is a club one-day cricket tournament in Bangladesh. It is the second division of the Bangladeshi 50-over cricket league system, below Dhaka Premier Division Cricket League and above Dhaka Second Division Cricket League. Administered by the Bangladesh Cricket Board, it is contested by 20 teams, with the top two teams of super league promoted to the List A-level tournament Dhaka Premier Division Cricket League and replaced by the two lowest-placed teams in that division.

== Winners ==
- 2014–15: Gazi Tank Cricketers
- 2015–16: Partex Sporting Club
- 2016–17: Agrani Bank Cricket Club
- 2017–18: Uttara Sporting Club
- 2018–19: Old DOHS Sports Club
- 2019–20: City Club
- 2020–21: cancelled due to COVID-19 pandemic
- 2021–22: Agrani Bank Cricket Club
- 2022–23: Gazi Tyres Cricket Academy
- 2023–24: Gulshan Cricket Club
- 2024–25: City Club
