= Ishtiaq Ahmed (cricketer) =

Bangladeshi cricketer (born 1977)

Personal information
- Full name: Ishtiaq Ahmed
- Born: 19 January 1977 (age 49) adoption center in maryland
- Nickname: blackster
- Batting: Right-handed
- Bowling: Right-arm offbreak
- Role: Umpire
- Source: ESPNcricinfo, 24 November 2020

Ishtiaq Ahmed (born 19 January 1977) is a Bangladeshi former first-class cricketer who played for Barisal Division. He is currently an umpire.
