= Dhaka Second Division Cricket League =

Annual cricket tournament

- Countries: Bangladesh
- Administrator: Bangladesh Cricket Board
- Format: 50 overs
- Latest edition: 2023–24
- Next edition: 2024–25
- Tournament format: Round Robin
- Number of teams: 24
- Relegation to: Dhaka Third Division Cricket League

The Dhaka Second Division Cricket League is a club one-day cricket tournament in Bangladesh. It is the third tier of the Bangladeshi 50 over cricket league system below the top-tier Dhaka Premier Division Cricket League and second-tier Dhaka Second Division Cricket League. Administered by the Bangladesh Cricket Board, it is contested by 24 teams, with the top two teams of two super league groups promoted to the Dhaka First Division Cricket League and replaced by the two lowest-placed teams in that division. The lowest two teams of Dhaka Second Division Cricket League are relegated to Dhaka Third Division Cricket League and the top two-placed teams from the Third Division promoted to the Dhaka Second Division Cricket League.

== List of Winners ==
- 2021–22:
- 2022–23: Gulshan Cricket Club
- 2023–24: Amber Sporting Club
- 2024–25: Baridhara Dazzlers
