= Asaduzzaman Payel =

Bangladeshi cricketer (born 1998)

Personal information
- Born: 1 September 1998 (age 28)
- Batting: Right-handed
- Bowling: Right-arm medium
- Source: Cricinfo, 13 August 2021

Asaduzzaman Payel (born 1 September 1998) is a Bangladeshi cricketer. He made his Twenty20 debut for Uttara Sporting Club in the 2018–19 Dhaka Premier Division Twenty20 Cricket League on 27 February 2019. He made his List A debut for Uttara Sporting Club in the 2018–19 Dhaka Premier Division Cricket League on 8 March 2019. He made his first-class debut for Rajshahi Division against Chittagong Division in the 2020–21 National Cricket League on 22 March 2021.
