= Gulshan Cricket Club =

- Nickname: GCC

Personnel
- Captain: Azizul Hakim Tamim
- Coach: Khaled Mahmud

Team information
- City: Gulshan, Dhaka

History
- Dhaka First Division Cricket League wins: 1
- Dhaka Second Division Cricket League wins: 1

Gulshan Cricket Club (Bengali: গুলশান ক্রিকেট ক্লাব) is a Bangladeshi club cricket team competing in the List A Dhaka Premier Division Cricket League. The club earned promotion to the Premier Division for the 2024–25 season after winning the 2023–24 Dhaka First Division Cricket League. They had earlier secured the Dhaka Second Division Cricket League title in the 2022–23 season.

== History ==
Gulshan Cricket Club represents the Gulshan area of Dhaka, Bangladesh. The club has made significant progress in domestic cricket in the 2020s. In the 2022–23 season, Gulshan won the Dhaka Second Division Cricket League, earning promotion to the First Division. Continuing their success, they won the Dhaka First Division Cricket League in 2023–24, securing a spot in the Dhaka Premier Division Cricket League.

Gulshan Cricket Club was run by Beximco Sports until the company ran into difficulties with the fall of the Awami League government in 2024. In February 2025, former Bangladesh captain Tamim Iqbal and Fortune Barishal owner Mizanur Rahman invested in Gulshan Cricket Club, strengthening the team financially and strategically.

In the 2024–25 Dhaka Premier Division Cricket League, Gulshan Cricket Club made a strong start, securing a 107-run victory against Mohammedan Sporting Club in their opening match. However, they finished the tournament in fifth place out of twelve.

== Honours ==
- Dhaka First Division Cricket League:
  - 2023–24
- Dhaka Second Division Cricket League:
  - 2022–23

== List A record ==
- 2024–25: 16 matches, won 8, finished fifth
- 2025–26: 11 matches, won 3, finished 11th
