= 2023–24 Dhaka Second Division Cricket League =

Cricket tournament

- Dates: 10 November 2023 – 23 December 2023
- Administrator(s): Bangladesh Cricket Board
- Cricket format: 50 over
- Tournament format(s): Round-robin
- Champions: Amber Sporting Club
- Participants: 24
- Matches: 166

The 2023–24 Dhaka Second Division Cricket League is the 2023–24 season of Dhaka Second Division Cricket League. This is a 50 over cricket competition that is being held in Bangladesh. It was played by 24 club teams. The tournament was played from 10 November to 23 December 2023. Amber Sporting Club became the champions and by virtue of their victory were promoted to 2024–25 Dhaka First Division Cricket League.

== Teams ==
- Amber Sporting Club
- Bangladesh Boys Club
- Bangladesh Krira Shikhha Pratistan
- Banani Cricket Club
- Bangladesh Police Cricket Club
- Baridhara Dazzlers
- Dhaka Mariner Youngs Club
- Dhaka Cricket Academy
- Dhaka Wanderers Club
- Dhanmondi Progoti Sangha
- Gopibagh Friends Association
- Golden Eagles Sporting Club
- Fear Fighters Sporting Club
- Mirpur Boys Cricket Club
- Jatrabari Krira Chakra
- Nawabganj Cricket Coaching Academy
- North Bengal Cricket Academy
- Purbachal Sporting Club
- Rayer Bazar Athletic Club
- Mohammadpur Cricket Club
- Sadharan Bima Krira Sangstha
- Victoria Sporting Club
- Young Pegasus Club-A
- Rupali Bank Krira Parishad

== League Stage ==
Group A

Team	Pld	W	L	T	NR	Pts	NRR
Amber Sporting Club	11	10	0	0	1	21	1.372
Dhanmondi Progoti Sangha	11	7	3	0	1	15	0.303
Mirpur Boys Cricket Club	11	7	4	0	0	14	-0.282
Sadharan Bima Krira Sangstha	11	6	4	0	1	13	0.069
Golden Eagles Sporting Club	11	6	5	0	0	12	0.280
Rupali Bank Krira Parishad	11	5	5	0	1	11	-0.207
Young Pegasus Club-A	11	5	6	0	0	10	-0.022
North Bengal Cricket Academy	11	4	6	0	1	9	0.170
Bangladesh Boys Club	11	4	6	0	1	9	-0.004
Dhaka Wanderers Club	11	4	6	0	1	9	-0.295
Jatrabari Krira Chakra	11	4	7	0	0	8	-0.049
Purbachal Sporting Club	11	0	10	0	1	1	-1.323

Teams qualified for the Super League phase of the tournament.

Teams qualified for the Relegation League play-offs phase of the tournament.

Group B

Team	Pld	W	L	T	NR	Pts	NRR
Bangladesh Police Cricket Club	11	9	2	0	0	18	0.730
Baridhara Dazzlers	11	7	4	0	0	14	0.341
Victoria Sporting Club	11	6	4	1	0	13	-0.534
Rayer Bazar Athletic Club	11	5	5	1	0	11	0.011
Bangladesh Krira Shikhha Pratistan	11	5	6	0	0	10	0.292
Gopibagh Friends Association	11	5	6	0	0	10	0.167
Banani Cricket Club	11	5	6	0	0	10	0.165
Dhaka Cricket Academy	11	5	6	0	0	10	-0.159
Mohammadpur Cricket Club	11	5	6	0	0	10	-0.382
Fear Fighters Sporting Club	11	5	6	0	0	10	-0.776
Nawabganj Cricket Coaching Academy	11	4	7	0	0	8	0.302
Dhaka Mariner Youngs Club	11	4	7	0	0	8	-0.087

Teams qualified for the Super League phase of the tournament.

Teams qualified for the Relegation League play-offs phase of the tournament.

== Relegation League ==
Relegation League

Team	Pld	W	L	NR	Pts	NRR
Dhaka Mariner Youngs Club	3	3	0	0	6	1.408
Nawabganj Cricket Coaching Academy	3	2	1	0	4	0.550
Jatrabari Krira Chakra	3	1	2	0	2	0.840
Purbachal Sporting Club	3	0	3	0	0	-5.860

Team relegated to the 2024–25 Dhaka Third Division Cricket League

== Super League ==
Group A

Team	Pld	W	L	T	NR	Pts	NRR
Amber Sporting Club (C)	5	5	0	0	0	10	1.738
Dhanmondi Progoti Sangha	5	3	2	0	0	6	0.294
Mirpur Boys Cricket Club	5	3	2	0	0	6	0.243
Bangladesh Krira Shikhha Pratistan	5	3	2	0	0	6	-0.014
Rayer Bazar Athletic Club	5	1	4	0	0	2	-0.911
Victoria Sporting Club	5	0	5	0	0	0	-1.235

Group B

Team	Pld	W	L	T	NR	Pts	NRR
Bangladesh Police Cricket Club	5	4	0	0	1	9	1.695
Gopibagh Friends Association	5	3	1	0	1	7	0.600
Sadharan Bima Krira Sangstha	5	2	2	1	0	5	0.322
Baridhara Dazzlers	5	2	2	0	1	5	-0.598
Rupali Bank Krira Parishad	5	1	2	1	1	4	-0.160
Golden Eagles Sporting Club	5	0	5	0	0	0	-1.543

Promoted to 2024–25 Dhaka First Division Cricket League.

C = Champion
