= City Club (cricket) =

Bangladeshi cricket team

Personnel
- Captain: Mehedi Maruf

City Club are a Bangladeshi cricket team that has played List A cricket in the Dhaka Premier Division Cricket League. They are based in Mirpur.

City Club were promoted to List A status for the first time for the 2021–22 tournament, along with Rupganj Tigers Cricket Club. They played their first match against Prime Bank Cricket Club on 15 March 2022, losing by 50 runs; seven of the team, including the captain, Jawad Royen, were playing their first List A match. Their first victory came on 3 April in their sixth match, when they beat Khelaghar Samaj Kallyan Samity by one wicket with one ball to spare.

City Club finished last in the Premier League in 2023–24 and were demoted to the Dhaka First Division Cricket League. They finished in the top two in 2024–25, thus earning promotion back to the Premier League for 2025–26.

== List A record ==
- 2021–22: 11 matches, won 4, finished tenth
- 2022–23: 11 matches, won 4, finished eighth
- 2023–24: 13 matches, won 2, finished 12th (relegated)
- 2025–26: 11 matches, won 4, finished 7th

== Records ==
City Club's highest List A score is 151 by Abdullah Al Mamun in 2025-26, and the best bowling figures are 6 for 37 by Abdul Gaffar Saqlain in 2025-26.
