= Old DOHS Sports Club =

Old DOHS Sports Club is a team that has played List A cricket in the Dhaka Premier Division Cricket League in Bangladesh in 2014–15 and 2019–20.

The sports club is based at the Defense Officers Housing Society estate (known as "Old DOHS" or "Banani DOHS") in the suburb of Banani in Dhaka. Old DOHS Sports Club won the Dhaka Premier League title twice in the years before it became a List A competition, including in 2011–12, the last season before the League was granted List A status. In 2012 the club was bought by Prime Bank Limited and renamed Prime Bank Cricket Club.

Old DOHS returned as a separate team to the Dhaka Premier League for the 2014–15 season. It lost all 13 of its matches, and was demoted to the non-List-A Dhaka First Division League for 2015–16. There it won five of its nine matches and finished in the middle of the table. In 2018–19 Old DOHS finished first in the Dhaka First Division League and thus qualified to return to the Dhaka Premier League in 2019–20, but the 2019–20 tournament was abandoned shortly after it began, owing to the COVID-19 pandemic, and since then Old DOHS has remained in the Dhaka First Division League.

== List A record ==
- 2014–15: 11 matches, won none, finished last
- 2019–20: abandoned due to COVID-19 pandemic
