= 2021–22 Dhaka Premier Division Cricket League =

Cricket tournament

- Dates: 15 March – 28 April 2022
- Administrator: Bangladesh Cricket Board
- Cricket format: List A
- Tournament format: Round-robin
- Champions: Sheikh Jamal Dhanmondi Club (1st title)
- Participants: 11
- Matches: 73
- Most runs: Anamul Haque (1138)
- Most wickets: Rakibul Hasan (29)

The 2021–22 Dhaka Premier Division Cricket League was an edition of the Dhaka Premier Division Cricket League, a List A cricket competition that was held in Bangladesh. It was the eighth edition of the tournament with List A status, although almost 35 seasons had been played before achieving the status. The tournament took place from 15 March to 28 April 2022. The previous edition of the tournament, in March 2020, ended after just one round of matches, due to the COVID-19 pandemic. The tournament was abandoned and later replaced by the 2021 Dhaka Premier Division Twenty20 Cricket League.

Ahead of the tournament, Prime Doleshwar Sporting Club were announced as not participating, reducing the number of teams to eleven. City Club and Rupganj Tigers Cricket Club were both promoted from the Dhaka First Division Cricket League, playing List A cricket for the first time.

Following the conclusion of the group stage of the tournament, Sheikh Jamal Dhanmondi Club had topped the table with nine wins from their ten matches. At the bottom of the table, Brothers Union, City Club and Khelaghar Samaj Kallyan Samity all progressed to the Relegation League play-offs. Khelaghar Samaj Kallyan Samity finished in last place and were relegated to the Dhaka First Division Cricket League. Ahead of the final round of matches, Sheikh Jamal Dhanmondi Club won the tournament, after taking an unassailable lead in the points table with a four wicket win against Abahani Limited. Also in the penultimate round of matches, Anamul Haque became the first batter to score 1,000 runs in a single season of the Dhaka Premier Division Cricket League.

== Teams ==
The following teams competed in the tournament:

- Abahani Limited
- Brothers Union
- City Club
- Gazi Group Cricketers
- Khelaghar Samaj Kallyan Samity
- Legends of Rupganj
- Mohammedan Sporting Club
- Prime Bank Cricket Club
- Rupganj Tigers Cricket Club
- Sheikh Jamal Dhanmondi Club
- Shinepukur Cricket Club

== Points tables ==
Group stage

| Teams | Pld | W | L | NR | Pts | NRR |
|---|---|---|---|---|---|---|
| Sheikh Jamal Dhanmondi Club | 10 | 9 | 1 | 0 | 18 | +0.619 |
| Abahani Limited | 10 | 7 | 3 | 0 | 14 | +0.416 |
| Legends of Rupganj | 10 | 7 | 3 | 0 | 14 | +0.344 |
| Prime Bank Cricket Club | 10 | 6 | 4 | 0 | 12 | +0.680 |
| Rupganj Tigers Cricket Club | 10 | 5 | 5 | 0 | 10 | +0.100 |
| Gazi Group Cricketers | 10 | 5 | 5 | 0 | 10 | –0.228 |
| Mohammedan Sporting Club | 10 | 5 | 5 | 0 | 10 | –0.243 |
| Shinepukur Cricket Club | 10 | 4 | 6 | 0 | 8 | –0.320 |
| Brothers Union | 10 | 3 | 7 | 0 | 6 | –0.484 |
| City Club | 10 | 3 | 7 | 0 | 6 | –0.509 |
| Khelaghar Samaj Kallyan Samity | 10 | 1 | 9 | 0 | 2 | –0.467 |

Teams qualified for the Super League phase of the tournament.

Teams qualified for the Relegation League play-offs phase of the tournament.

Super League

| Team | Pld | W | L | NR | Pts | NRR |
|---|---|---|---|---|---|---|
| Sheikh Jamal Dhanmondi Club | 15 | 12 | 3 | 0 | 24 | +0.344 |
| Legends of Rupganj | 15 | 11 | 4 | 0 | 22 | +0.661 |
| Prime Bank Cricket Club | 15 | 10 | 5 | 0 | 20 | +1.033 |
| Abahani Limited | 15 | 9 | 6 | 0 | 18 | +0.220 |
| Rupganj Tigers Cricket Club | 15 | 6 | 9 | 0 | 12 | –0.155 |
| Gazi Group Cricketers | 15 | 6 | 9 | 0 | 12 | –0.718 |

Champions

Relegation League

| Team | Pld | W | L | NR | Pts | NRR |
|---|---|---|---|---|---|---|
| Brothers Union | 12 | 4 | 7 | 1 | 9 | –0.430 |
| City Club | 12 | 3 | 8 | 1 | 7 | –0.621 |
| Khelaghar Samaj Kallyan Samity | 12 | 2 | 10 | 0 | 4 | –0.265 |

Team relegated to the Dhaka First Division Cricket League.

== Fixtures ==
=== Round robin ===
==== Round 1 ====
15 March 2022
09:30
Scorecard

| Abahani Limited; 255/9 (50 overs) | v | Rupganj Tigers Cricket Club; 259/3 (42 overs) |
| Mohammad Naim 115 (132); Mukidul Islam 3/51 (10 overs) | | Zakir Hasan 117 (116); Kamrul Islam Rabbi 2/50 (6 overs) |

Rupganj Tigers Cricket Club won by 7 wickets
Sher-e-Bangla National Cricket Stadium, Dhaka
Umpires: Tanvir Ahmed and Masudur Rahman
Player of the match: Zakir Hasan (Rupganj Tigers Cricket Club)

- Rupganj Tigers Cricket Club won the toss and elected to field.

15 March 2022
09:30
Scorecard

| Prime Bank Cricket Club; 265/8 (50 overs) | v | City Club; 215 (45.2 overs) |
| Anamul Haque 60 (82); Aminur Rahman 2/42 (8 overs) | | Jawad Royen 37* (47); Mahedi Hasan 3/53 (10 overs) |

Prime Bank Cricket Club won by 50 runs
Bangladesh Krira Shikkha Protisthan No 3 Ground, Savar
Umpires: Muhammad Kamruzzaman and Mozahiduzzaman
Player of the match: Mahedi Hasan (Prime Bank Cricket Club)

- City Club won the toss and elected to field.
- Moinul Islam, Towfiq Khan, Ashik-Ul-Alam Naem, Aminur Rahman, Jawad Royen (City Club) and Robiul Hoque (Prime Bank Cricket Club) all made their List A debuts.

15 March 2022
09:30
Scorecard

| Legends of Rupganj; 291/7 (50 overs) | v | Gazi Group Cricketers; 144 (30.4 overs) |
| Naeem Islam 92 (114); Qazi Onik 3/36 (10 overs) | | Mahmudul Hasan 33 (44); Tanbir Hayder 2/10 (2 overs) |

Legends of Rupganj won by 147 runs
Bangladesh Krira Shikkha Protisthan No 4 Ground, Savar
Umpires: Ali Arman and Mahfuzur Rahman
Player of the match: Naeem Islam (Legends of Rupganj)

- Gazi Group Cricketers won the toss and elected to field.
- Husna Habib, Alamgir Hossain, and Ashiqur Zaman (Gazi Group Cricketers) all made their List A debuts.

16 March 2022
09:30
Scorecard

| Khelaghar Samaj Kallyan Samity; 221/7 (50 overs) | v | Sheikh Jamal Dhanmondi Club; 222/4 (47.4 overs) |
| Amite Hasan 107* (136); Saif Hassan 3/30 (10 overs) | | Shykat Ali 63 (58); Hossain Ali 2/30 (6 overs) |

Sheikh Jamal Dhanmondi Club won by 6 wickets
Bangladesh Krira Shikkha Protisthan No 3 Ground, Savar
Umpires: Shafiuddin Ahmed and Mahfuzur Rahman
Player of the match: Saif Hassan (Sheikh Jamal Dhanmondi Club)

- Sheikh Jamal Dhanmondi Club won the toss and elected to field.
- Rony Chowdhury (Khelaghar Samaj Kallyan Samity) made his List A debut.

16 March 2022
09:30
Scorecard

| Shinepukur Cricket Club; 250/7 (50 overs) | v | Mohammedan Sporting Club; 209 (48.3 overs) |
| Sajjadul Haque 70 (59); Soumya Sarkar 3/52 (9 overs) | | Parvez Hossain Emon 54 (88); Anisul Islam Emon 2/14 (1.3 overs) |

Shinepukur Cricket Club won by 41 runs
Sher-e-Bangla National Cricket Stadium, Dhaka
Umpires: Tanvir Ahmed and Imran Parvez
Player of the match: Alauddin Babu (Shinepukur Cricket Club)

- Mohammedan Sporting Club won the toss and elected to field.
- Ariful Islam (Mohammedan Sporting Club) and Ripon Mondol (Shinepukur Cricket Club) both made their List A debuts.

==== Round 2 ====
18 March 2022
09:30
Scorecard

| Prime Bank Cricket Club; 314/6 (50 overs) | v | Rupganj Tigers Cricket Club; 228 (44.2 overs) |
| Anamul Haque 127 (125); Shafiqul Islam 2/51 (10 overs) | | Baba Aparajith 79 (93); Rakibul Hasan 4/44 (10 overs) |

Prime Bank Cricket Club won by 86 runs
Bangladesh Krira Shikkha Protisthan No 4 Ground, Savar
Umpires: Tanvir Ahmed and Ali Arman
Player of the match: Anamul Haque (Prime Bank Cricket Club)

- Rupganj Tigers Cricket Club won the toss and elected to field.

18 March 2022
09:30
Scorecard

| City Club; 199 (49.5 overs) | v | Gazi Group Cricketers; 200/4 (46.4 overs) |
| Ashik-Ul-Alam Naem 51 (83); Qazi Onik 6/30 (9.5 overs) | | Mehedi Maruf 90 (113); Abdul Halim 2/45 (7.4 overs) |

Gazi Group Cricketers won by 6 wickets
Sher-e-Bangla National Cricket Stadium, Dhaka
Umpires: Morshed Ali Khan and Mozahiduzzaman
Player of the match: Qazi Onik (Gazi Group Cricketers)

- Gazi Group Cricketers won the toss and elected to field.

18 March 2022
09:30
Scorecard

| Sheikh Jamal Dhanmondi Club; 297/5 (50 overs) | v | Legends of Rupganj; 248 (47.3 overs) |
| Imrul Kayes 122 (139); Mehedi Hasan Rana 2/54 (10 overs) | | Naeem Islam 95 (111); Sunzamul Islam 5/47 (10 overs) |

Sheikh Jamal Dhanmondi Club won by 49 runs
Bangladesh Krira Shikkha Protisthan No 3 Ground, Savar
Umpires: Shyful Islam and Masudur Rahman
Player of the match: Imrul Kayes (Sheikh Jamal Dhanmondi Club)

- Sheikh Jamal Dhanmondi Club won the toss and elected to bat.

19 March 2022
09:30
Scorecard

| Khelaghar Samaj Kallyan Samity; 148 (49 overs) | v | Mohammedan Sporting Club; 150/5 (40.1 overs) |
| Nadif Chowdhury 33 (54); Nazmul Islam 4/18 (10 overs) | | Soumya Sarkar 59* (100); Hossain Ali 2/8 (2.5 overs) |

Mohammedan Sporting Club won by 5 wickets
Sher-e-Bangla National Cricket Stadium, Dhaka
Umpires: Muhammad Kamruzzaman and Mahfuzur Rahman
Player of the match: Nazmul Islam (Mohammedan Sporting Club)

- Mohammedan Sporting Club won the toss and elected to field.

19 March 2022
09:30
Scorecard

| Shinepukur Cricket Club; 280/6 (50 overs) | v | Brothers Union; 281/7 (49.1 overs) |
| Sikandar Raza 74* (65); Aminul Islam 3/60 (10 overs) | | Sadikur Rahman 84 (73); Nayeem Hasan 2/48 (10 overs) |

Brothers Union won by 3 wickets
Bangladesh Krira Shikkha Protisthan No 3 Ground, Savar
Umpires: Morshed Ali Khan and Mozahiduzzaman
Player of the match: Sadikur Rahman (Brothers Union)

- Shinepukur Cricket Club won the toss and elected to bat.

==== Round 3 ====
21 March 2022
09:30
Scorecard

| Abahani Limited; 309/5 (50 overs) | v | City Club; 198 (42 overs) |
| Shamim Hossain 108* (66); Jawad Royen 2/33 (10 overs) | | Moinul Islam 74 (71); Arafat Sunny 5/33 (10 overs) |

Abahani Limited won by 111 runs
Bangladesh Krira Shikkha Protisthan No 3 Ground, Savar
Umpires: Tanvir Ahmed and Ali Arman
Player of the match: Arafat Sunny (Abahani Limited)

- City Club won the toss and elected to field.
- Zakirul Ahmed (City Club) made his List A debut.

21 March 2022
09:30
Scorecard

| Legends of Rupganj; 265/5 (50 overs) | v | Prime Bank Cricket Club; 269/6 (48.1 overs) |
| Raqibul Hasan 121 (125); Rubel Hossain 2/58 (8 overs) | | Shahadat Hossain 131* (145); Nabil Samad 3/33 (10 overs) |

Prime Bank Cricket Club won by 4 wickets
Bangladesh Krira Shikkha Protisthan No 4 Ground, Savar
Umpires: Imran Parvez and Mahfuzur Rahman
Player of the match: Shahadat Hossain (Prime Bank Cricket Club)

- Legends of Rupganj won the toss and elected to bat.

21 March 2022
09:30
Scorecard

| Gazi Group Cricketers; 246/7 (50 overs) | v | Khelaghar Samaj Kallyan Samity; 160 (39.3 overs) |
| Al-Amin 61 (93); Masum Khan 3/59 (10 overs) | | Masum Khan 44 (53); Gurinder Singh 3/40 (10 overs) |

Gazi Group Cricketers won by 86 runs
ULAB Cricket Ground, Dhaka
Umpires: Shafiuddin Ahmed and Mozahiduzzaman
Player of the match: Gurinder Singh (Gazi Group Cricketers)

- Khelaghar Samaj Kallyan Samity won the toss and elected to field.
- Jubarul Islam (Gazi Group Cricketers) made his List A debut.

22 March 2022
09:30
Scorecard

| Sheikh Jamal Dhanmondi Club; 146 (36.4 overs) | v | Shinepukur Cricket Club; 132 (44 overs) |
| Robiul Islam Robi 48 (55); Rahatul Ferdous 4/35 (5.4 overs) | | Sajjadul Haque 38* (45); Sunzamul Islam 4/33 (10 overs) |

Sheikh Jamal Dhanmondi Club won by 14 runs
Bangladesh Krira Shikkha Protisthan No 3 Ground, Savar
Umpires: Shafiuddin Ahmed and Mahfuzur Rahman
Player of the match: Sunzamul Islam (Sheikh Jamal Dhanmondi Club)

- Shinepukur Cricket Club won the toss and elected to field.

22 March 2022
09:30
Scorecard

| Mohammedan Sporting Club; 206 (49.4 overs) | v | Brothers Union; 152 (43.3 overs) |
| Rony Talukdar 58 (60); Mohammad Ashraful 5/23 (10 overs) | | Imtiaz Hossain 42 (65); Shuvagata Hom 5/25 (8.3 overs) |

Mohammedan Sporting Club won by 54 runs
Bangladesh Krira Shikkha Protisthan No 4 Ground, Savar
Umpires: Tanvir Ahmed and Imran Parvez
Player of the match: Shuvagata Hom (Mohammedan Sporting Club)

- Brothers Union won the toss and elected to field.

==== Round 4 ====
24 March 2022
09:30
Scorecard

| Legends of Rupganj; 297/6 (50 overs) | v | Abahani Limited; 283/8 (50 overs) |
| Naeem Islam 124 (109); Mosaddek Hossain 2/58 (10 overs) | | Towhid Hridoy 74 (82); Mashrafe Mortaza 3/63 (9 overs) |

Legends of Rupganj won by 14 runs
Bangladesh Krira Shikkha Protisthan No 3 Ground, Savar
Umpires: Mahfuzur Rahman and Masudur Rahman
Player of the match: Naeem Islam (Legends of Rupganj)

- Abahani Limited won the toss and elected to field.

24 March 2022
09:30
Scorecard

| Prime Bank Cricket Club; 249 (49.4 overs) | v | Khelaghar Samaj Kallyan Samity; 253/3 (47.4 overs) |
| Abhimanyu Easwaran 48 (61); Tipu Sultan 2/33 (10 overs) | | Amite Hasan 85 (97); Mahedi Hasan 2/48 (10 overs) |

Khelaghar Samaj Kallyan Samity won by 7 wickets
Bangladesh Krira Shikkha Protisthan No 4 Ground, Savar
Umpires: Tanvir Ahmed and Mozahiduzzaman
Player of the match: Amite Hasan (Khelaghar Samaj Kallyan Samity)

- Khelaghar Samaj Kallyan Samity won the toss and elected to field.
- Rishad Hossain (Khelaghar Samaj Kallyan Samity) made his List A debut.

25 March 2022
09:30
Scorecard

| Gazi Group Cricketers; 247/8 (50 overs) | v | Shinepukur Cricket Club; 250/6 (47.5 overs) |
| Akbar Ali 61 (60); Hasan Murad 3/25 (10 overs) | | Avishek Mitra 86 (84); Husna Habib 2/46 (10 overs) |

Shinepukur Cricket Club won by 4 wickets
Bangladesh Krira Shikkha Protisthan No 3 Ground, Savar
Umpires: Ali Arman and Masudur Rahman
Player of the match: Avishek Mitra (Shinepukur Cricket Club)

- Shinepukur Cricket Club won the toss and elected to field.

25 March 2022
09:30
Scorecard

| Brothers Union; 158 (44.1 overs) | v | Sheikh Jamal Dhanmondi Club; 160/2 (33 overs) |
| Mohammad Ashraful 55 (96); Parvez Rasool 3/9 (10 overs) | | Saif Hassan 81 (85); Raihan Uddin 2/24 (4 overs) |

Sheikh Jamal Dhanmondi Club won by 8 wickets
ULAB Cricket Ground, Dhaka
Umpires: Tanvir Ahmed and Muhammad Kamruzzaman
Player of the match: Parvez Rasool (Sheikh Jamal Dhanmondi Club)

- Sheikh Jamal Dhanmondi Club won the toss and elected to field.

25 March 2022
09:30
Scorecard

| City Club; 261/8 (20 overs) | v | Rupganj Tigers Cricket Club; 262/3 (41.2 overs) |
| Zakirul Ahmed 114 (119); Ariful Haque 2/33 (5 overs) | | Zakir Hasan 124 (99); Nazmul Hossain Milon 1/7 (2 overs) |

Rupganj Tigers Cricket Club won by 7 wickets
Bangladesh Krira Shikkha Protisthan No 4 Ground, Savar
Umpires: Shyful Islam and Mozahiduzzaman
Player of the match: Zakir Hasan (Rupganj Tigers Cricket Club)

- Rupganj Tigers Cricket Club won the toss and elected to field.
- Usman Khalid (City Club) made his List A debut.

==== Round 5 ====
27 March 2022
09:30
Scorecard

| Abahani Limited; 261/9 (50 overs) | v | Khelaghar Samaj Kallyan Samity; 241/9 (50 overs) |
| Mohammad Naim 84 (118); Mehedi Hasan 2/31 (9 overs) | | Amit Majumder 79 (90); Arafat Sunny 3/44 (10 overs) |

Abahani Limited won by 20 runs
Bangladesh Krira Shikkha Protisthan No 3 Ground, Savar
Umpires: Mozahiduzzaman and Masudur Rahman
Player of the match: Mohammad Naim (Abahani Limited)

- Khelaghar Samaj Kallyan Samity won the toss and elected to field.

27 March 2022
09:30
Scorecard

| Prime Bank Cricket Club; 388/5 (50 overs) | v | Shinepukur Cricket Club; 277/8 (50 overs) |
| Anamul Haque 184 (142); Sikandar Raza 2/41 (8 overs) | | Sikandar Raza 98 (109); Rakibul Hasan 4/45 (10 overs) |

Prime Bank Cricket Club won by 111 runs
Bangladesh Krira Shikkha Protisthan No 4 Ground, Savar
Umpires: Ali Arman and Mahfuzur Rahman
Player of the match: Anamul Haque (Prime Bank Cricket Club)

- Shinepukur Cricket Club won the toss and elected to field.

28 March 2022
09:30
Scorecard

| Gazi Group Cricketers; 297/8 (50 overs) | v | Brothers Union; 291/9 (50 overs) |
| Farhad Hossain 92 (94); Sohag Gazi 2/42 (10 overs) | | Imtiaz Hossain 106 (114); Qazi Onik 3/79 (10 overs) |

Gazi Group Cricketers won by 6 runs
Bangladesh Krira Shikkha Protisthan No 3 Ground, Savar
Umpires: Mozahiduzzaman and Asadur Rahman
Player of the match: Farhad Hossain (Gazi Group Cricketers)

- Brothers Union won the toss and elected to field.
- SM Meherob (Gazi Group Cricketers) made his List A debut.

28 March 2022
09:30
Scorecard

| Sheikh Jamal Dhanmondi Club; 185 (48 overs) | v | Mohammedan Sporting Club; 186/5 (45.2 overs) |
| Taibur Rahman 53* (78); Nazmul Islam 3/9 (6 overs) | | Rony Talukdar 57 (79); Robiul Islam Robi 1/22 (7 overs) |

Mohammedan Sporting Club won by 5 wickets
ULAB Cricket Ground, Dhaka
Umpires: Muhammad Kamruzzaman and Masudur Rahman
Player of the match: Nazmul Islam (Mohammedan Sporting Club)

- Mohammedan Sporting Club won the toss and elected to field.

28 March 2022
09:30
Scorecard

| Rupganj Tigers Cricket Club; 294 (50 overs) | v | Legends of Rupganj; 257/3 (43 overs) |
| Zakir Hasan 91 (82); Nabil Samad 2/39 (10 overs) | | Chirag Jani 122 (109); Ariful Haque 1/18 (3 overs) |

Legends of Rupganj won by 29 runs (DLS method)
Bangladesh Krira Shikkha Protisthan No 4 Ground, Savar
Umpires: Ali Arman and Mahfuzur Rahman
Player of the match: Chirag Jani (Legends of Rupganj)

- Legends of Rupganj won the toss and elected to field.
- Legends of Rupganj were set a revised target of 229 runs from 43 overs due to rain.

==== Round 6 ====
30 March 2022
09:30
Scorecard

| Abahani Limited; 333/5 (50 overs) | v | Shinepukur Cricket Club; 299/7 (50 overs) |
| Mosaddek Hossain 88 (65); Naimur Rohman 2/61 (8 overs) | | Sikandar Raza 107 (93); Tanvir Islam 2/50 (10 overs) |

Abahani Limited won by 34 runs
ULAB Cricket Ground, Dhaka
Umpires: Tanvir Ahmed and Ali Arman
Player of the match: Mosaddek Hossain (Abahani Limited)

- Shinepukur Cricket Club won the toss and elected to field.
- Tahjibul Islam and Naimur Rohman (Shinepukur Cricket Club) both made their List A debuts.

30 March 2022
09:30
Scorecard

| Prime Bank Cricket Club; 273/9 (50 overs) | v | Brothers Union; 272 (49.4 overs) |
| Nasir Hossain 66 (77); Abu Hider 4/51 (10 overs) | | Aminul Islam 62 (77); Rejaur Rahman Raja 5/43 (10 overs) |

Prime Bank Cricket Club won by 1 run
Bangladesh Krira Shikkha Protisthan No 4 Ground, Savar
Umpires: Shyful Islam and Mahfuzur Rahman
Player of the match: Rejaur Rahman Raja (Prime Bank Cricket Club)

- Brothers Union won the toss and elected to field.

30 March 2022
09:30
Scorecard

| Gazi Group Cricketers; 346/7 (50 overs) | v | Mohammedan Sporting Club; 274 (44.1 overs) |
| Akbar Ali 89* (45); Mahmudullah 2/37 (3 overs) | | Rony Talukdar 82 (63); Al-Amin 3/1 (1.1 overs) |

Gazi Group Cricketers won by 72 runs
Bangladesh Krira Shikkha Protisthan No 3 Ground, Savar
Umpires: Mozahiduzzaman and Imran Parvez
Player of the match: Akbar Ali (Gazi Group Cricketers)

- Mohammedan Sporting Club won the toss and elected to field.

31 March 2022
09:30
Scorecard

| Legends of Rupganj; 225/9 (40 overs) | v | City Club; 203 (37.5 overs) |
| Naeem Islam 52 (75); Usman Khalid 3/28 (8 overs) | | Ashik-Ul-Alam Naem 62 (63); Chirag Jani 4/28 (6.5 overs) |

Legends of Rupganj won by 22 runs
Bangladesh Krira Shikkha Protisthan No 4 Ground, Savar
Umpires: Ali Arman and Asadur Rahman
Player of the match: Chirag Jani (Legends of Rupganj)

- City Club won the toss and elected to field.
- The match was reduced to 40 overs per side due to rain.
- Shahriar Alam (City Club) made his List A debut.

31 March 2022
09:30
Scorecard

| Rupganj Tigers Cricket Club; 259/7 (50 overs) | v | Khelaghar Samaj Kallyan Samity; 223 (46.3 overs) |
| Baba Aparajith 98 (120); Elias Sunny 2/51 (10 overs) | | Elias Sunny 59 (64); Farhad Reza 2/21 (3 overs) |

Rupganj Tigers Cricket Club won by 36 runs
Bangladesh Krira Shikkha Protisthan No 3 Ground, Savar
Umpires: Mozahiduzzaman and Mahfuzur Rahman
Player of the match: Baba Aparajith (Rupganj Tigers Cricket Club)

- Khelaghar Samaj Kallyan Samity won the toss and elected to field.
- Shahin Alam (Khelaghar Samaj Kallyan Samity) made his List A debut.

==== Round 7 ====
2 April 2022
09:30
Scorecard

| Brothers Union; 219 (48.3 overs) | v | Abahani Limited; 221/4 (38.5 overs) |
| Minhajul Abedin 51 (71); Tanzim Hasan Sakib 5/55 (9.3 overs) | | Hanuma Vihari 112* (115); Abu Hider 2/48 (9.5 overs) |

Abahani Limited won by 6 wickets
Bangladesh Krira Shikkha Protisthan No 4 Ground, Savar
Umpires: Ali Arman and Moniruzzaman
Player of the match: Tanzim Hasan Sakib (Abahani Limited)

- Abahani Limited won the toss and elected to field.
- Abu Raihan (Brothers Union) made his List A debut.

2 April 2022
09:30
Scorecard

| Prime Bank Cricket Club; 312 (49.3 overs) | v | Mohammedan Sporting Club; 185 (38.3 overs) |
| Anamul Haque 94 (94); Soumya Sarkar 4/54 (9.3 overs) | | Ariful Islam 53 (67); Rakibul Hasan 4/40 (10 overs) |

Prime Bank Cricket Club won by 127 runs
Bangladesh Krira Shikkha Protisthan No 3 Ground, Savar
Umpires: Tanvir Ahmed and Mozahiduzzaman
Player of the match: Anamul Haque (Prime Bank Cricket Club)

- Mohammedan Sporting Club won the toss and elected to field.
- Musfik Hasan (Mohammedan Sporting Club) made his List A debut.

3 April 2022
09:30
Scorecard

| Gazi Group Cricketers; 157 (36 overs) | v | Sheikh Jamal Dhanmondi Club; 160/1 (26.3 overs) |
| Al-Amin 29 (35); Ziaur Rahman 3/12 (6 overs) | | Shykat Ali 77* (79); Akbar-ur-Rehman 1/48 (7.3 overs) |

Sheikh Jamal Dhanmondi Club won by 9 wickets
Bangladesh Krira Shikkha Protisthan No 3 Ground, Savar
Umpires: Shafiuddin Ahmed and Mozahiduzzaman
Player of the match: Ziaur Rahman (Sheikh Jamal Dhanmondi Club)

- Sheikh Jamal Dhanmondi Club won the toss and elected to field.

3 April 2022
09:30
Scorecard

| Rupganj Tigers Cricket Club; 172 (48.3 overs) | v | Shinepukur Cricket Club; 175/9 (49.4 overs) |
| Fazle Mahmud 52 (97); Ripon Mondol 3/30 (9.3 overs) | | Sikandar Raza 48 (52); Nasum Ahmed 3/21 (10 overs) |

Shinepukur Cricket Club won by 1 wicket
Bangladesh Krira Shikkha Protisthan No 4 Ground, Savar
Umpires: Shyful Islam and Habibur Rahman
Player of the match: Ripon Mondol (Shinepukur Cricket Club)

- Shinepukur Cricket Club won the toss and elected to field.

3 April 2022
09:30
Scorecard

| Khelaghar Samaj Kallyan Samity; 241/7 (50 overs) | v | City Club; 246/9 (49.5 overs) |
| Amite Hasan 85 (108); Shahriar Alam 3/74 (10 overs) | | Ashik-Ul-Alam Naem 74 (105); Masum Khan 4/41 (10 overs) |

City Club won by 1 wicket
ULAB Cricket Ground, Dhaka
Umpires: Ali Arman and Asadur Rahman
Player of the match: Zakirul Ahmed (City Club)

- City Club won the toss and elected to field.

==== Round 8 ====
5 April 2022
09:30
Scorecard

| Mohammedan Sporting Club; 255 (49 overs) | v | Abahani Limited; 256/4 (46.2 overs) |
| Mohammad Hafeez 70 (101); Tanzim Hasan Sakib 3/33 (9 overs) | | Jaker Ali 60 (89); Shuvagata Hom 1/38 (8 overs) |

Abahani Limited won by 6 wickets
Sher-e-Bangla National Cricket Stadium, Dhaka
Umpires: Morshed Ali Khan and Mozahiduzzaman
Player of the match: Afif Hossain (Abahani Limited)

- Abahani Limited won the toss and elected to field.

5 April 2022
09:30
Scorecard

| Prime Bank Cricket Club; 265/9 (50 overs) | v | Sheikh Jamal Dhanmondi Club; 266/9 (49.5 overs) |
| Anamul Haque 77 (61); Parvez Rasool 4/25 (10 overs) | | Parvez Rasool 65* (51); Alok Kapali 2/28 (9 overs) |

Sheikh Jamal Dhanmondi Club won by 1 wicket
ULAB Cricket Ground, Dhaka
Umpires: Ali Arman and Moniruzzaman
Player of the match: Parvez Rasool (Sheikh Jamal Dhanmondi Club)

- Sheikh Jamal Dhanmondi Club won the toss and elected to field.
- Arif Ahmed (Sheikh Jamal Dhanmondi Club) made his List A debut.

5 April 2022
09:30
Scorecard

| Brothers Union; 309/4 (50 overs) | v | Rupganj Tigers Cricket Club; 273 (47.4 overs) |
| Mohammad Ashraful 141* (139); Fazle Mahmud 1/19 (3 overs) | | Fazle Mahmud 100 (100); Saqlain Sajib 2/47 (10 overs) |

Brothers Union won by 36 runs
Bangladesh Krira Shikkha Protisthan No 3 Ground, Savar
Umpires: Asadur Rahman and Masudur Rahman
Player of the match: Mohammad Ashraful (Brothers Union)

- Rupganj Tigers Cricket Club won the toss and elected to field.

6 April 2022
09:30
Scorecard

| Shinepukur Cricket Club; 175 (47.2 overs) | v | City Club; 179/6 (40.4 overs) |
| Sajjadul Haque 37 (76); Rajibul Islam 3/18 (10 overs) | | Shahriar Komol 55 (89); Tasamul Haque 3/21 (5 overs) |

City Club won by 4 wickets
Bangladesh Krira Shikkha Protisthan No 4 Ground, Savar
Umpires: Ali Arman and Mozahiduzzaman
Player of the match: Rajibul Islam (City Club)

- Shinepukur Cricket Club won the toss and elected to bat.

6 April 2022
09:30
Scorecard

| Khelaghar Samaj Kallyan Samity; 198 (48 overs) | v | Legends of Rupganj; 199/8 (49.3 overs) |
| Amit Majumder 59 (88); Mashrafe Mortaza 4/38 (8 overs) | | Chirag Jani 72 (78); Salman Hossain 3/45 (9 overs) |

Legends of Rupganj won by 2 wickets
Sher-e-Bangla National Cricket Stadium, Dhaka
Umpires: Ishtiaq Ahmed and Asadur Rahman
Player of the match: Mashrafe Mortaza (Legends of Rupganj)

- Legends of Rupganj won the toss and elected to field.

==== Round 9 ====
8 April 2022
09:30
Scorecard

| Abahani Limited; 177 (45.4 overs) | v | Sheikh Jamal Dhanmondi Club; 182/5 (48.4 overs) |
| Shamim Hossain 51 (72); Parvez Rasool 5/29 (9.4 overs) | | Robiul Islam Robi 57* (88); Afif Hossain 2/38 (7.4 overs) |

Sheikh Jamal Dhanmondi Club won by 5 wickets
Bangladesh Krira Shikkha Protisthan No 4 Ground, Savar
Umpires: Ali Arman and Habibur Rahman
Player of the match: Parvez Rasool (Sheikh Jamal Dhanmondi Club)

- Sheikh Jamal Dhanmondi Club won the toss and elected to field.

8 April 2022
09:30
Scorecard

| Gazi Group Cricketers; 256/9 (50 overs) | v | Prime Bank Cricket Club; 252/9 (50 overs) |
| Mehedi Maruf 118 (140); Rejaur Rahman Raja 3/78 (10 overs) | | Anamul Haque 85 (100); Husna Habib 3/39 (10 overs) |

Gazi Group Cricketers won by 4 runs
Sher-e-Bangla National Cricket Stadium, Dhaka
Umpires: Mozahiduzzaman and Barkatulylah Turkey
Player of the match: Mehedi Maruf (Gazi Group Cricketers)

- Prime Bank Cricket Club won the toss and elected to field.
- Rakibul Atik (Gazi Group Cricketers) made his List A debut.

9 April 2022
09:30
Scorecard

| Mohammedan Sporting Club; 143 (38.1 overs) | v | Rupganj Tigers Cricket Club; 149/3 (36.2 overs) |
| Mahmudullah 48 (52); Enamul Haque 5/41 (9.1 overs) | | Asif Ahmed 48 (92); Yeasin Arafat 2/33 (4 overs) |

Rupganj Tigers Cricket Club won by 7 wickets
Sher-e-Bangla National Cricket Stadium, Dhaka
Umpires: Morshed Ali Khan and Moniruzzaman
Player of the match: Enamul Haque (Rupganj Tigers Cricket Club)

- Rupganj Tigers Cricket Club won the toss and elected to field.

9 April 2022
09:30
Scorecard

| Brothers Union; 270/8 (50 overs) | v | City Club; 272/7 (50 overs) |
| Dhiman Ghosh 51 (44); Usman Khalid 3/59 (10 overs) | | Jawad Royen 79* (66); Sohag Gazi 2/36 (8 overs) |

City Club won by 3 wickets
Bangladesh Krira Shikkha Protisthan No 3 Ground, Savar
Umpires: Shyful Islam and Asadur Rahman
Player of the match: Jawad Royen (City Club)

- City Club won the toss and elected to field.

9 April 2022
09:30
Scorecard

| Legends of Rupganj; 215/9 (50 overs) | v | Shinepukur Cricket Club; 206 (49 overs) |
| Irfan Sukkur 64 (62); Ripon Mondol 4/38 (10 overs) | | Rakin Ahmed 67 (92); Mehedi Hasan Rana 4/29 (5 overs) |

Legends of Rupganj won by 9 runs
Bangladesh Krira Shikkha Protisthan No 4 Ground, Savar
Umpires: Ali Arman and Masudur Rahman
Player of the match: Naeem Islam (Legends of Rupganj)

- Shinepukur Cricket Club won the toss and elected to field.

==== Round 10 ====
11 April 2022
09:30
Scorecard

| Abahani Limited; 311/7 (50 overs) | v | Gazi Group Cricketers; 310 (50 overs) |
| Jaker Ali 109 (103); Al-Amin 3/43 (7 overs) | | Al-Amin 92 (66); Mohammad Saifuddin 3/56 (10 overs) |

Abahani Limited won by 1 run
Bangladesh Krira Shikkha Protisthan No 3 Ground, Savar
Umpires: Mozahiduzzaman and Asadur Rahman
Player of the match: Jaker Ali (Abahani Limited)

- Gazi Group Cricketers won the toss and elected to field.

11 April 2022
09:30
Scorecard

| Sheikh Jamal Dhanmondi Club; 202 (48.1 overs) | v | Rupganj Tigers Cricket Club; 198/8 (50 overs) |
| Saif Hassan 61 (94); Nasum Ahmed 4/22 (10 overs) | | Asif Ahmed 95 (132); Mrittunjoy Chowdhury 3/37 (8 overs) |

Sheikh Jamal Dhanmondi Club won by 4 runs
Sher-e-Bangla National Cricket Stadium, Dhaka
Umpires: Imran Parvez and Barkatulylah Turkey
Player of the match: Ziaur Rahman (Sheikh Jamal Dhanmondi Club)

- Rupganj Tigers Cricket Club won the toss and elected to field.

11 April 2022
09:30
Scorecard

| Mohammedan Sporting Club; 228/9 (50 overs) | v | City Club; 223 (48.4 overs) |
| Abdul Mazid 64 (86); Abdul Halim 3/43 (10 overs) | | Jawad Royen 69 (92); Hasan Mahmud 3/47 (10 overs) |

Mohammedan Sporting Club won by 5 runs
Bangladesh Krira Shikkha Protisthan No 4 Ground, Savar
Umpires: Ali Arman and Masudur Rahman
Player of the match: Hasan Mahmud (Mohammedan Sporting Club)

- City Club won the toss and elected to field.

12 April 2022
09:30
Scorecard

| Legends of Rupganj; 168 (44.1 overs) | v | Brothers Union; 85 (22.2 overs) |
| Sabbir Rahman 46 (50); Ifran Hossain 4/23 (8.1 overs) | | Chaturanga de Silva 16 (15); Chirag Jani 4/22 (6 overs) |

Legends of Rupganj won by 83 runs
Sher-e-Bangla National Cricket Stadium, Dhaka
Umpires: Moniruzzaman and Masudur Rahman
Player of the match: Naeem Islam (Legends of Rupganj)

- Brothers Union won the toss and elected to field.
- The match was reduced to 45 overs per side due to rain.

12 April 2022
09:30
Scorecard

| Khelaghar Samaj Kallyan Samity; 216/8 (33 overs) | v | Shinepukur Cricket Club; 220/6 (31.3 overs) |
| Amit Majumder 57 (49); Alauddin Babu 4/45 (7 overs) | | Avishek Mitra 62 (56); Nihaduzzaman 2/45 (4.3 overs) |

Shinepukur Cricket Club won by 4 wickets
Bangladesh Krira Shikkha Protisthan No 3 Ground, Savar
Umpires: Ali Arman and Asadur Rahman
Player of the match: Alauddin Babu (Shinepukur Cricket Club)

- Shinepukur Cricket Club won the toss and elected to field.
- The match was reduced to 33 overs per side due to rain.
- Rayan Rahman (Shinepukur Cricket Club) made his List A debut.

==== Round 11 ====
14 April 2022
09:30
Scorecard

| Abahani Limited; 271/7 (50 overs) | v | Prime Bank Cricket Club; 243 (48.1 overs) |
| Hanuma Vihari 58 (74); Mahedi Hasan 3/40 (8 overs) | | Mohammad Mithun 103 (95); Mohammad Saifuddin 2/39 (10 overs) |

Abahani Limited won by 28 runs
Sher-e-Bangla National Cricket Stadium, Dhaka
Umpires: Tanvir Ahmed and Ali Arman
Player of the match: Mohammad Mithun (Prime Bank Cricket Club)

- Prime Bank Cricket Club won the toss and elected to field.

14 April 2022
09:30
Scorecard

| Gazi Group Cricketers; 205/7 (50 overs) | v | Rupganj Tigers Cricket Club; 208/6 (47.4 overs) |
| Mehedi Maruf 56 (112); Nasum Ahmed 2/22 (10 overs) | | Fazle Mahmud 74 (119); Al-Amin 2/22 (5 overs) |

Rupganj Tigers Cricket Club won by 4 wickets
Bangladesh Krira Shikkha Protisthan No 3 Ground, Savar
Umpires: Kamruzzaman Limon and Mozahiduzzaman
Player of the match: Nasum Ahmed (Rupganj Tigers Cricket Club)

- Gazi Group Cricketers won the toss and elected to bat.
- Maraj Mahbub and Mim Mosaddeak (Gazi Group Cricketers) both made their List A debuts.

15 April 2022
09:30
Scorecard

| Sheikh Jamal Dhanmondi Club; 197 (46.2 overs) | v | City Club; 144 (43.1 overs) |
| Imrul Kayes 61 (89); Moinul Islam 3/38 (10 overs) | | Jawad Royen 45 (51); Robiul Islam Robi 3/19 (9 overs) |

Sheikh Jamal Dhanmondi Club won by 53 runs
Sher-e-Bangla National Cricket Stadium, Dhaka
Umpires: Sajidul Islam and Gazi Sohel
Player of the match: Imrul Kayes (Sheikh Jamal Dhanmondi Club)

- City Club won the toss and elected to field.

15 April 2022
09:30
Scorecard

| Mohammedan Sporting Club; 307 (47.5 overs) | v | Legends of Rupganj; 227 (49.1 overs) |
| Kusal Mendis 101 (91); Mehedi Hasan Rana 4/50 (7.5 overs) | | Naeem Islam 80 (118); Nazmul Islam 5/35 (10 overs) |

Mohammedan Sporting Club won by 80 runs
Bangladesh Krira Shikkha Protisthan No 3 Ground, Savar
Umpires: Mozahiduzzaman and Shafeen Shareef
Player of the match: Kusal Mendis (Mohammedan Sporting Club)

- Mohammedan Sporting Club won the toss and elected to bat.

15 April 2022
09:30
Scorecard

| Brothers Union; 306/5 (50 overs) | v | Khelaghar Samaj Kallyan Samity; 293 (49.2 overs) |
| Dhiman Ghosh 89* (74); Hossain Ali 2/71 (9 overs) | | Pritom Kumar 72 (74); Saqlain Sajib 4/53 (10 overs) |

Brothers Union won by 13 runs
Bangladesh Krira Shikkha Protisthan No 4 Ground, Savar
Umpires: Sharfuddoula and Barkatulylah Turkey
Player of the match: Aminul Islam (Brothers Union)

- Khelaghar Samaj Kallyan Samity won the toss and elected to field.

=== Super League ===
18 April 2022
09:30
Scorecard

| Sheikh Jamal Dhanmondi Club; 271/5 (50 overs) | v | Gazi Group Cricketers; 199 (43.5 overs) |
| Parvez Rasool 73 (64); Dhruv Shorey 3/31 (10 overs) | | Dhruv Shorey 55 (73); Parvez Rasool 3/34 (7.5 overs) |

Sheikh Jamal Dhanmondi Club won by 72 runs
Bangladesh Krira Shikkha Protisthan No 3 Ground, Savar
Umpires: Imran Parvez and Masudur Rahman
Player of the match: Parvez Rasool (Sheikh Jamal Dhanmondi Club)

- Gazi Group Cricketers won the toss and elected to field.

18 April 2022
09:30
Scorecard

| Legends of Rupganj; 325/5 (50 overs) | v | Rupganj Tigers Cricket Club; 270/9 (50 overs) |
| Sabbir Rahman 125 (111); Mukidul Islam 2/50 (10 overs) | | Saad Nasim 116* (107); Nabil Samad 5/47 (10 overs) |

Legends of Rupganj won by 55 runs
Bangladesh Krira Shikkha Protisthan No 4 Ground, Savar
Umpires: Kamruzzaman Limon and Mozahiduzzaman
Player of the match: Sabbir Rahman (Legends of Rupganj)

- Legends of Rupganj won the toss and elected to bat.
- Tanzid Hasan (Legends of Rupganj) replaced Sabbir Hossain as substitute.

18 April 2022
09:30
Scorecard

| Prime Bank Cricket Club; 273/9 (50 overs) | v | Abahani Limited; 131 (32.4 overs) |
| Anamul Haque 77 (85); Dhananjaya de Silva 3/57 (10 overs) | | Mosaddek Hossain 65 (57); Rakibul Hasan 3/18 (6 overs) |

Prime Bank Cricket Club won by 142 runs
Sher-e-Bangla National Cricket Stadium, Dhaka
Umpires: Sharfuddoula and Gazi Sohel
Player of the match: Anamul Haque (Prime Bank Cricket Club)

- Abahani Limited won the toss and elected to field.

21 April 2022
09:30
Scorecard

| Rupganj Tigers Cricket Club; 247/6 (50 overs) | v | Sheikh Jamal Dhanmondi Club; 251/6 (49 overs) |
| Zakir Hasan 75 (98); Mehidy Hasan 3/40 (10 overs) | | Nurul Hasan 132* (118); Mukidul Islam 2/76 (10 overs) |

Sheikh Jamal Dhanmondi Club won by 4 wickets
Sher-e-Bangla National Cricket Stadium, Dhaka
Umpires: Ali Arman and Sharfuddoula
Player of the match: Nurul Hasan (Sheikh Jamal Dhanmondi Club)

- Sheikh Jamal Dhanmondi Club won the toss and elected to field.

21 April 2022
09:30
Scorecard

| Prime Bank Cricket Club; 152 (31.2 overs) | v | Legends of Rupganj; 154/7 (32.4 overs) |
| Anamul Haque 73 (91); Shakib Al Hasan 2/19 (7 overs) | | Muktar Ali 39* (45); Rakibul Hasan 2/36 (7 overs) |

Legends of Rupganj won by 3 wickets
Bangladesh Krira Shikkha Protisthan No 4 Ground, Savar
Umpires: Mozahiduzzaman and Shafeen Shareef
Player of the match: Muktar Ali (Legends of Rupganj)

- Legends of Rupganj won the toss and elected to field.
- The match was reduced to 33 overs per side due to rain.

21 April 2022
09:30
Scorecard

| Gazi Group Cricketers; 276/6 (36 overs) | v | Abahani Limited; 249 (34.3 overs) |
| Mahmudul Hasan 88 (67); Tanvir Islam 3/63 (8 overs) | | Najmul Hossain Shanto 76 (70); Al-Amin 6/22 (4.3 overs) |

Gazi Group Cricketers won by 27 runs
Bangladesh Krira Shikkha Protisthan No 3 Ground, Savar
Umpires: Imran Parvez and Gazi Sohel
Player of the match: Al-Amin (Gazi Group Cricketers)

- Abahani Limited won the toss and elected to field.
- The match was reduced to 36 overs per side due to rain.

24 April 2022
09:30
Scorecard

| Sheikh Jamal Dhanmondi Club; 232/8 (50 overs) | v | Prime Bank Cricket Club; 234/2 (40.2 overs) |
| Nurul Hasan 71 (105); Taijul Islam 3/42 (10 overs) | | Tamim Iqbal 90 (85); Saif Hassan 1/20 (3 overs) |

Prime Bank Cricket Club won by 8 wickets
Bangladesh Krira Shikkha Protisthan No 4 Ground, Savar
Umpires: Masudur Rahman and Gazi Sohel
Player of the match: Tamim Iqbal (Prime Bank Cricket Club)

- Prime Bank Cricket Club won the toss and elected to field.

24 April 2022
09:30
Scorecard

| Abahani Limited; 279/7 (50 overs) | v | Legends of Rupganj; 198 (41.5 overs) |
| Najmul Hossain Shanto 86 (101); Shakib Al Hasan 3/53 (10 overs) | | Chirag Jani 48 (56); Mosaddek Hossain 4/40 (10 overs) |

Abahani Limited won by 81 runs
Sher-e-Bangla National Cricket Stadium, Dhaka
Umpires: Mozahiduzzaman and Sharfuddoula
Player of the match: Mosaddek Hossain (Abahani Limited)

- Abahani Limited won the toss and elected to bat.

24 April 2022
09:30
Scorecard

| Rupganj Tigers Cricket Club; 314/4 (50 overs) | v | Gazi Group Cricketers; 230 (43.4 overs) |
| Fazle Mahmud 104* (108); Mahmudul Hasan 2/38 (10 overs) | | Mahmudul Hasan 59 (55); Nasum Ahmed 4/54 (8.3 overs) |

Rupganj Tigers Cricket Club won by 84 runs
Bangladesh Krira Shikkha Protisthan No 3 Ground, Savar
Umpires: Shahin Al Asad and Ali Arman
Player of the match: Fazle Mahmud (Rupganj Tigers Cricket Club)

- Gazi Group Cricketers won the toss and elected to field.

26 April 2022
09:30
Scorecard

| Abahani Limited; 229/6 (50 overs) | v | Sheikh Jamal Dhanmondi Club; 232/6 (47 overs) |
| Towhid Hridoy 53 (75); Ziaur Rahman 2/36 (10 overs) | | Nurul Hasan 81* (81); Mohammad Saifuddin 2/36 (8 overs) |

Sheikh Jamal Dhanmondi Club won by 4 wickets
Sher-e-Bangla National Cricket Stadium, Dhaka
Umpires: Sharfuddoula and Gazi Sohel
Player of the match: Nurul Hasan (Sheikh Jamal Dhanmondi Club)

- Abahani Limited won the toss and elected to bat.

26 April 2022
09:30
Scorecard

| Legends of Rupganj; 293/9 (50 overs) | v | Gazi Group Cricketers; 97 (29.2 overs) |
| Sabbir Rahman 90 (83); Maraj Mahbub 2/38 (7 overs) | | Husna Habib 32 (50); Chirag Jani 5/15 (7.2 overs) |

Legends of Rupganj won by 196 runs
Bangladesh Krira Shikkha Protisthan No 3 Ground, Savar
Umpires: Moniruzzaman and Masudur Rahman
Player of the match: Sabbir Rahman (Legends of Rupganj)

- Legends of Rupganj won the toss and elected to bat.

26 April 2022
09:30
Scorecard

| Rupganj Tigers Cricket Club; 229 (49.4 overs) | v | Prime Bank Cricket Club; 234/0 (26.4 overs) |
| Saad Nasim 85 (94); Karim Janat 4/40 (8 overs) | | Anamul Haque 112* (84) |

Prime Bank Cricket Club won by 10 wickets
Bangladesh Krira Shikkha Protisthan No 4 Ground, Savar
Umpires: Nazmul Hasan and Shyful Islam
Player of the match: Anamul Haque (Prime Bank Cricket Club)

- Prime Bank Cricket Club won the toss and elected to field.
- Shah Paran and Mohiuddin Tareq (Rupganj Tigers Cricket Club) both made their List A debuts.

28 April 2022
09:30
Scorecard

| Sheikh Jamal Dhanmondi Club; 116 (34.4 overs) | v | Legends of Rupganj; 120/2 (25.1 overs) |
| Imrul Kayes 50 (75); Al-Amin Hossain 6/31 (8.4 overs) | | Raqibul Hasan 40* (79); Parvez Rasool 2/20 (10 overs) |

Legends of Rupganj won by 8 wickets
Sher-e-Bangla National Cricket Stadium, Dhaka
Umpires: Moniruzzaman and Masudur Rahman
Player of the match: Al-Amin Hossain (Legends of Rupganj)

- Legends of Rupganj won the toss and elected to field.

28 April 2022
09:30
Scorecard

| Abahani Limited; 275/9 (50 overs) | v | Rupganj Tigers Cricket Club; 212 (45.5 overs) |
| Afif Hossain 78 (91); Abdul Gaffar 3/23 (10 overs) | | Ariful Haque 95 (73); Mohammad Saifuddin 4/38 (7.5 overs) |

Abahani Limited won by 63 runs
Bangladesh Krira Shikkha Protisthan No 4 Ground, Savar
Umpires: Shyful Islam and Gazi Sohel
Player of the match: Mohammad Saifuddin (Abahani Limited)

- Abahani Limited won the toss and elected to bat.

28 April 2022
09:30
Scorecard

| Prime Bank Cricket Club; 355/7 (50 overs) | v | Gazi Group Cricketers; 277 (47.5 overs) |
| Tamim Iqbal 137 (132); Maraj Mahbub 3/54 (7 overs) | | Al-Amin 87 (91); Taijul Islam 3/50 (9.5 overs) |

Prime Bank Cricket Club won by 78 runs
Bangladesh Krira Shikkha Protisthan No 3 Ground, Savar
Umpires: Amit Mojumder and Mozahiduzzaman
Player of the match: Tamim Iqbal (Prime Bank Cricket Club)

- Prime Bank Cricket Club won the toss and elected to bat.

=== Relegation League ===
18 April 2022
09:30
Scorecard

| Khelaghar Samaj Kallyan Samity; 289/8 (50 overs) | v | City Club; 204 (47.4 overs) |
| Amite Hasan 101 (113); Usman Khalid 4/61 (10 overs) | | Jawad Royen 54 (58); Masum Khan 3/42 (8 overs) |

Khelaghar Samaj Kallyan Samity won by 85 runs
Khan Shaheb Osman Ali Stadium, Fatullah
Umpires: Shahin Al Asad and Ali Arman
Player of the match: Amite Hasan (Khelaghar Samaj Kallyan Samity)

- City Club won the toss and elected to field.

21 April 2022
09:30
Scorecard

| Khelaghar Samaj Kallyan Samity; 152 (35.1 overs) | v | Brothers Union; 154/2 (34.5 overs) |
| Sachin Baby 64 (82); Abu Hider 3/27 (7 overs) | | Imtiaz Hossain 87* (107); Elias Sunny 1/22 (7 overs) |

Brothers Union won by 8 wickets
Khan Shaheb Osman Ali Stadium, Fatullah
Umpires: Moniruzzaman and Masudur Rahman
Player of the match: Imtiaz Hossain (Brothers Union)

- Brothers Union won the toss and elected to field.
- The match was reduced to 37 overs per side due to rain.

24 April 2022
09:30
Scorecard

| Brothers Union | v | City Club |

Match abandoned
Khan Shaheb Osman Ali Stadium, Fatullah
Umpires: Nazmul Hasan and Habibur Rahman

- No toss.
- No play was possible due to rain.
