= 2017 Rangpur Riders season =

Rangpur Riders
2017–18 Bangladesh Premier League season
- Coach: Tom Moody
- Captain: Mashrafe Mortaza
- BPL: Champions
- Most runs: Chris Gayle (485)
- Most wickets: Mashrafe Mortaza (15)

The Rangpur Riders are a franchise cricket team based in Rangpur, Bangladesh, which plays in the Bangladesh Premier League (BPL). They were one of seven teams that competed in the 2017–18 BPL. The team was captained by Mashrafe Mortaza. They defeated the Dhaka Dynamites in the final to be crowned the champions.

== Team changes ==
Previous icon player Soumya Sarkar was not retained, resulting in the team announcing Mashrafe Mortaza as the new icon and captain.

They signed Jamaican T20 specialist Chris Gayle before the draft. He was initially supposed to play in four matches, but due to the postponement of the T20 Global League, was available for the full season. They also signed two English seam bowling all-rounders, David Willey and Ravi Bopara. Their other squad members included West Indian Samuel Badree.

The team retained Rubel Hossain, Sohag Gazi, and Mohammad Mithun.

The team picked eight local and three overseas players in the draft. Their first pick was Shahriar Nafees, a prominent Bangladeshi batsman. The surprise pick was the inexperienced and little-known Afghan slow left-arm wrist-spin bowler Zahir Khan.

Due to the postponement of the T20 Global League, the team added Sri Lankan Lasith Malinga and former New Zealand captain and opener Brendon McCullum.

== Points table ==
Pos	Team	Pld	W	L	NR	Pts	NRR
1	Comilla Victorians (3)	12	9	3	0	18	0.578
2	Dhaka Dynamites (R)	12	7	4	1	15	1.631
3	Khulna Titans (4)	12	7	4	1	15	0.075
4	Rangpur Riders (C)	12	6	6	0	12	−0.267
5	Sylhet Sixers	12	4	7	1	9	−0.429
6	Rajshahi Kings	12	4	8	0	8	−1.098
7	Chittagong Vikings	12	3	8	1	7	−0.473

Source: Cricinfo.com
- The top four teams qualified for the playoffs
- advanced to the Qualifier 1
- advanced to the Eliminator

== Squad ==
- Players with international caps are listed in **bold**
- Ages are as of the date of the first match in the season

No.	Name	Nationality	2017|11|04	Batting style	Bowling style	Year signed	Notes
Batsmen
5	**Shahriar Nafees**	Bangladesh	1 May 1985 (aged 32)	Left-handed	–	2017	
9	**Adam Lyth**	England	25 September 1979 (aged 38)	Left-handed	Right-arm off break	2017	Overseas
42	**Brendon McCullum**	New Zealand	27 September 1981 (aged 36)	Right-handed	Right arm medium	2017	Overseas
333	**Chris Gayle**	West Indies	21 September 1979 (aged 38)	Left-handed	Right-arm off break	2017	Overseas
All-rounders
1	**Thisara Perera**	Sri Lanka	3 April 1989 (aged 28)	Left-handed	Right-arm medium	2015	Overseas
10	**Ravi Bopara**	England	4 May 1985 (aged 32)	Right-handed	Right-arm fast-medium	2017	Overseas
13	**Ziaur Rahman**	Bangladesh	3 December 1986 (aged 30)	Left-handed	Right-arm medium	2016	
15	**David Willey**	England	28 February 1990 (aged 27)	Left-handed	Left-arm fast-medium	2017	Overseas
19	**Fazle Mahmud**	Bangladesh	30 December 1987 (aged 29)	Left-handed	Slow left-arm orthodox	2017	
33	**Sohag Gazi**	Bangladesh	5 August 1991 (aged 26)	Right-handed	Right-arm off-break	2016	
44	Nahidul Islam	Bangladesh	19 July 1993 (aged 24)	Right-handed	Right-arm off-break	2017	
Wicket-keepers
8	**Mohammad Mithun**	Bangladesh	13 February 1990 (aged 27)	Right-handed	–	2015	
25	**Johnson Charles**	West Indies	14 January 1989 (aged 28)	Right-handed	Right-arm medium-fast	2017	Overseas
88	**Kusal Perera**	Sri Lanka	17 August 1990 (aged 27)	Left-handed	–	2017	Overseas
Bowlers
2	**Mashrafe Mortaza**	Bangladesh	5 October 1983 (aged 34)	Right-handed	Right-arm medium-fast	2017	Captain
19	**Elias Sunny**	Bangladesh	2 August 1986 (aged 31)	Left-handed	Slow left-arm orthodox	2016	
21	**Nazmul Islam**	Bangladesh	21 March 1991 (aged 26)	Left-handed	Slow left-arm orthodox	2017	
34	**Rubel Hossain**	Bangladesh	1 January 1990 (aged 27)	Right-handed	Right-arm fast	2016	
41	**Abdur Razzak**	Bangladesh	15 June 1982 (aged 35)	Left-handed	Slow left-arm orthodox	2017	
58	Ebadat Hossain	Bangladesh	7 January 1994 (aged 23)	Right-handed	Right-arm fast	2017	
75	Zahir Khan	Afghanistan	20 December 1998 (aged 18)	Left-handed	Slow left-arm wrist-spin	2017	Overseas
77	**Samuel Badree**	West Indies	9 March 1981 (aged 36)	Right-handed	Right-arm leg break	2017	Overseas
99	**Lasith Malinga**	Sri Lanka	28 August 1983 (aged 34)	Right-handed	Right-arm fast-medium	2017	Overseas
