= 2019–20 Bangladesh Premier League players' draft =

2019–20 BPL players' draft

General information
- Sport: Cricket
- Date: 17 November 2019
- Time: 6:00 PM
- Location: Raddison Blu, Dhaka
- Network: Gazi TV
- Sponsored by: Akash DTH

Overview
- League: Bangladesh Premier League
- Teams: 7

The 2019–20 Bangladesh Premier League players draft took place on 17 November 2017.

During the players' direct signing period, a conflict of interest arose between BCB and the franchises. Subsequently, in September, BCB President Nazmul Hasan Papon informed the media about certain changes in rules and the forthcoming season which eliminated all franchises. The BCB took over the running the tournament, naming it as Bangabandhu BPL T20 2019 in order to pay homage to Sheikh Mujibur Rahman on his birth centenary.

On 16 November 2019, BCB unveiled the logo and name of the all seven teams for the current season. 5 out of 7 teams were sponsored by private companies while Rangpur Rangers and Cumilla Warriors are sponsored by BCB itself.

The draft for the 2019 Bangabandhu BPL T20 was held on 17 November 2019 at the Hotel Radisson, Dhaka. A total of 181 domestic players and 439 foreign players signed up for the players' draft.

== Rules for players' draft ==
BCB set some rules for players' draft. Those are-

- Each team can buy a minimum of 9 domestic and 6 foreign players.
- Any team can not buy more than 19 players, 11 being domestic and 8 foreign.
- Each team can make direct signing of maximum 2 foreign players outside of draft.
- Each team can buy 1 domestic A+ category player, but there only 4 player being listed in A+ category, other teams, who were not able to buy A+ category player, can buy maximum 2 A category player instead of A+.
- Each team can buy maximum 1 player from A category, 3 each from B and C category, and 2 each from D and E category.
- Each team has to buy a pace bowler who can bowl at a speed of 140 km/h or more.
- Each team has to include a leg-spinner.

== Draft summary ==
A total of 620 player (181 domestic and 439 overseas) signed up for the draft.

Country	Signed up fr draft	Sold
Bangladesh	183	74
Afghanistan	42	10
Australia	9	6
England	103	13
India	3	0
Ireland	7	0
New Zealand	4	3
Pakistan	89	6
South Africa	35	3
Sri Lanka	45	6
West Indies	72	13
Zimbabwe	9	1
Canada	14	0
Hong Kong	3	0
Namibia	1	0
Nepal	2	0
Netherlands	2	0
Oman	4	0
Scotland	6	0
United Arab Emirates	5	0
United States of America	7	0
Total	634	140

== Salary cap ==
Domestic players were divided into 6 categories while Foreign players were divided into 5 categories.

Domestic players

- A+ – ৳50 lakh (US$41,000) (4)
- A – ৳25 lakh (US$20,000) (9)
- B – ৳18 lakh (US$15,000) (24)
- C – ৳12 lakh (US$9,800) (41)
- D – ৳8 lakh (US$6,500) (59)
- E – ৳5 lakh (US$4,100) (44)

Foreign players

- A+ – US$100,000 (11)
- A – US$70,000 (15)
- B – US$50,000 (66)
- C – US$30,000 (75)
- D – US$20,000 (272)
- Notes:numbers in bracket (x) indicates the number of players signed up in the category

== Players' list ==
- Domestic players were divided into 6 category, 4 players were in the A+ category, 9 players in A Category, 24 players were in B category, 41 cricketers were in C category, 59 players in D category and 44 cricketers were allotted to E category.
- Foreign players were divided into 5 category, A+ category contains 11 players, A category 15, B category 66, C category 75 and D category contains 272 players

=== Domestic players ===
Domestic players with A+, A, B and C category are listed below.

A+ Category (৳50 lakh)

1. Mashrafe Mortaza
2. Mushfiqur Rahim
3. Tamim Iqbal
4. Mahmudullah

A Category (৳25 lakh)

1. Mosaddek Hossain
2. Mustafizur Rahman
3. Soumya Sarkar
4. Mehedi Hasan Miraz
5. Liton Das
6. Taijul Islam
7. Imrul Kayes
8. Mominul Haque
9. Mohammad Mithun

B Category (৳18 lakh)

1. Abu Haider
2. Sabbir Rahman
3. Afif Hossain
4. Anamul Haque
5. Rubel Hossain
6. Abu Jayed
7. Taskin Ahmed
8. Shafiul Islam
9. Nazmul Hossain Shanto
10. Shuvagata Hom
11. Nurul Hasan
12. Jahurul Islam
13. Farhad Reza
14. Al-Amin Hossain
15. Mehedi Hasan
16. Fazle Mahmud Rabbi
17. Yasir Ali
18. Rony Talukdar
19. Ariful Haque
20. Nazmul Islam
21. Sunzamul Islam
22. Nayeem Hasan
23. Al- Amin
24. Kamrul Islam Rabbi

C Category (৳12 lakh)

1. Mohammad Naim
2. Mohammad Ashraful
3. Shahriar Nafees
4. Ebadot Hossain
5. Subashis Roy
6. Alok Kapali
7. Sohag Gazi
8. Junaid Siddique
9. Shamsur Rahman
10. Khaled Ahmed
11. Arafat Sunny
12. Tanbir Hayder
13. Saikat Ali
14. Marshal Ayub
15. Mahmudul Hasan
16. Abdul Majid
17. Nadif Chowdhury
18. Irfan Sukkur
19. Saif Hassan
20. Sharifullah
21. Delwar Hossain
22. Monir Hossain
23. Ziaur Rahman
24. Muktar Ali
25. Alauddin Babu
26. Suhrawadi Shuvo
27. Naeem Islam
28. Rakibul Hasan
29. Saqlain Sajib
30. Mehedi Hasan Rana
31. Nahidul Islam
32. Shahidul Islam
33. Robiul Haque
34. Qazi Onik
35. Zakir Hasan
36. Jaker Ali
37. Nasir Hossain
38. Mosharraf Hossain
39. Abdur Razzak
40. Shadman Islam

=== Foreign players ===
Foreign players with A+, A and B category players are listed below.

A+ Category (US$100,000)

1. Dane Vilas
2. Shahid Afridi
3. Rilee Rossouw
4. Hassan Ali
5. Mohammad Nabi
6. ~~Shoaib Malik~~ (Note: Malik withdrawn his name from the draft just before the day it was scheduled to be held)
7. Mujeeb Ur Rahman
8. Chris Gayle
9. Thisara Perera
10. Dwayne Smith
11. Darren Bravo

A Category (US$70,000)

1. Isuru Udana
2. Ravi Bopara
3. Mohammad Amir
4. Kemar Roach
5. Marlon Samuels
6. Mohammad Hafeez
7. Dimuth Karunaratne
8. Kusal Perera
9. Mohammad Hasnain
10. Rassie van der Dussen
11. Shai Hope
12. Wayne Parnell
13. Fakhar Zaman
14. Oshane Thomas
15. Sam Billings

B Category (US$50,000)

1. Niroshan Dickwella
2. Kyle Abbott
3. Hardus Viljoen
4. David Wiese
5. JP Duminy
6. Ahmed Shehzad
7. Mohammad Nawaz
8. Samit Patel
9. Keaton Jennings
10. Steven Finn
11. Sheldon Cottrell
12. Benny Howell
13. Dawid Malan
14. Imran Khan
15. Sami Aslam
16. Bilawal Bhatti
17. Azeem Rafiq
18. Imad Wasim
19. Wahab Riaz
20. Danny Briggs
21. Laurie Evans
22. Matt Parkinson
23. Avishka Fernando
24. Dasun Shanaka
25. Kusal Mendis
26. Danushka Gunathilaka
27. Simon Harmer
28. Ed Pollock
29. Matt Critchley
30. Joe Clarke
31. Cameron Delport
32. Kamran Akmal
33. Zahir Khan
34. Mohammad Shahzad
35. Craig Overton
36. Asghar Afghan
37. Asif Ali
38. Jade Dernbach
39. Asela Gunaratne
40. Upul Tharanga
41. Wanindu Hasaranga
42. Dhananjaya de Silva
43. Mohammad Irfan
44. Naseem Shah
45. Luke Fletcher
46. Jamie Porter
47. Lewis Gregory
48. Will Jacks
49. Rahkeem Cornwall
50. Ali Khan
51. Shannon Gabriel
52. Tymal Mills
53. Gulbadin Naib
54. Denesh Ramdin
55. Sherfane Rutherford
56. Brendan Taylor
57. Ryan ten Doeschate
58. Riki Wessels
59. Hazratullah Zazai
60. Robbie Frylinck
61. Steven Mullaney
62. Paul Coughlin
63. Andre Fletcher
64. Devendra Bishoo
65. Rovman Powell
66. Dwaine Pretorius
67. Tabraiz Shamsi

== Sold players ==
List of players bought in the draft.

Player	Team	Grade	Base price
Tamim Iqbal	Dhaka Platoon	A+	৳5,000,000
Mushfiqur Rahim	Khulna Tigers	A+	৳5,000,000
Mahmudullah	Chattogram Challengers	A+	৳5,000,000
Mustafizur Rahman	Rangpur Rangers	A	৳2,500,000
Liton Das	Rajshahi Royals	A	৳2,500,000
Soumya Sarkar	Cumilla Warriors	A	৳2,500,000
Mohammad Mithun	Sylhet Thunder	A	৳2,500,000
Chris Gayle	Chattogram Challengers	A+	US$100,000
Rilee Rossouw	Khulna Tigers	A+	US$100,000
Mohammad Nabi	Rangpur Rangers	A+	US$100,000
Thisara Perera	Dhaka Platoon	A+	US$100,000
Mujeeb Ur Rahman	Cumilla Warriors	A+	US$100,000
Sherfane Rutherford	Sylhet Thunder	A	US$70,000
Hazratullah Zazai	Rajshahi Royals	B	US$50,000
Imrul Kayes	Chattogram Challengers	A	৳2,500,000
Mosaddek Hossain	Sylhet Thunder	A	৳2,500,000
Afif Hossain	Rajshahi Royals	B	৳1,800,000
Anamul Haque	Dhaka Platoon	B	৳1,800,000
Al-Amin Hossain	Cumilla Warriors	B	৳1,800,000
Shafiul Islam	Khulna Tigers	B	৳1,800,000
Mohammad Naim	Rangpur Rangers	C	৳1,200,000
Shai Hope	Rangpur Rangers	A	US$70,000
Kusal Perera	Cumilla Warriors	A	US$70,000
Ravi Bopara	Rajshahi Royals	A	US$70,000
Laurie Evans	Dhaka Platoon	B	US$50,000
Robert Frylinck	Khulna Tigers	B	US$50,000
Kesrick Williams	Chattogram Challengers	D	US$20,000
Shafiqullah	Sylhet Thunder	D	US$20,000
Sabbir Rahman	Cumilla Warriors	B	৳1,800,000
Nazmul Hossain Shanto	Khulna Tigers	B	৳1,800,000
Abu Jayed	Rajshahi Royals	B	৳1,800,000
Arafat Sunny	Rangpur Rangers	C	৳1,200,000
Nazmul Islam	Sylhet Thunder	B	৳1,800,000
Nasir Hossain	Chattogram Challengers	C	৳1,200,000
Hasan Mahmud	Dhaka Platoon	E	৳500,000
Dawid Malan	Cumilla Warriors	B	US$70,000
Avishka Fernando	Chattogram Challengers	B	US$70,000
Wahab Riaz	Dhaka Platoon	B	US$70,000
Mohammad Amir	Khulna Tigers	A	US$100,000
Mohammad Nawaz	Rajshahi Royals	B	US$70,000
Lewis Gregory	Rangpur Rangers	B	US$70,000
Johnson Charles	Sylhet Thunder	D	US$20,000
Rubel Hossain	Chattogram Challengers	B	৳1,800,000
Yasir Ali	Cumilla Warriors	B	৳1,800,000
Mahedi Hasan	Dhaka Platoon	B	৳1,800,000
Aminul Islam	Khulna Tigers	D	৳500,000
Farhad Reza	Rajshahi Royals	B	৳1,800,000
Arafat Sunny	Rangpur Rangers	C	৳1,200,000
Sohag Gazi	Sylhet Thunder	C	৳1,800,000
Rayad Emrit	Chattogram Challengers	C	US$50,000
Dasun Shanaka	Cumilla Warriors	B	US$70,000
Asif Ali	Dhaka Platoon	B	US$70,000
Najibullah Zadran	Khulna Tigers	C	US$50,000
Mohammad Irfan	Rajshahi Royals	B	US$70,000
Cameron Delport	Rangpur Rangers	B	US$70,000
Naveen-ul-Haq	Sylhet Thunder	C	US$50,000
Nurul Hasan	Chattogram Challengers	B	৳1,800,000
Sunzamul Islam	Cumilla Warriors	B	৳1,800,000
Ariful Haque	Dhaka Platoon	B	৳1,800,000
Shamsur Rahman	Khulna Tigers	C	৳1,200,000
Taijul Islam	Rajshahi Royals	A	৳2,500,000
Taskin Ahmed	Rangpur Rangers	B	৳1,800,000
Rony Talukdar	Sylhet Thunder	B	৳1,800,000
Enamul Haque jnr	Chattogram Challengers	D	৳800,000
Abu Hider	Cumilla Warriors	B	৳1,800,000
Mominul Haque	Dhaka Platoon	A	৳2,500,000
Saif Hasan	Khulna Tigers	C	৳1,200,000
Alok Kapali	Rajshahi Royals	C	৳1,200,000
Zakir Hasan	Rangpur Rangers	C	৳1,200,000
Nayeem Hasan	Sylhet Thunder	B	৳1,800,000
Muktar Ali	Chattogram Challengers	C	৳1,200,000
Mahidul Islam Ankon	Cumilla Warriors	D	৳800,000
Shuvagata Hom	Dhaka Platoon	B	৳1,800,000
Mehedi Hasan	Khulna Tigers	B	৳1,800,000
Kamrul Islam Rabbi	Rajshahi Royals	B	৳1,800,000
Fazle Mahmud	Rangpur Rangers	B	৳1,800,000
Delwar Hossain	Sylhet Thunder	C	৳1,200,000
Pinak Ghosh	Chattogram Challengers	D	৳800,000
Sumon Khan	Cumilla Warriors	D	৳800,000
Mashrafe Mortaza	Dhaka Platoon	A+	৳5,000,000
Shahidul Islam	Khulna Tigers	C	৳1,200,000
Irfan Sukkur	Rajshahi Royals	C	৳1,200,000
Nadif Chowdhury	Rangpur Rangers	C	৳1,200,000
Monir Hossain	Sylhet Thunder	C	৳1,200,000
Nasum Ahmed	Chattogram Challengers	E	৳500,000
Fardeen Hasan Ony	Cumilla Warriors	D	৳800,000
Raqibul Hasan	Dhaka Platoon	C	৳1,200,000
Tanvir Islam	Khulna Tigers	D	৳800,000
Minhajul Abedin Afridi	Rajshahi Royals	D	৳800,000
Rishad Hossain	Rangpur Rangers		
Ruyel Miah	Sylhet Thunder	D	৳800,000
Junaid Siddique	Chattogram Challengers	C	৳1,200,000
Jaker Ali	Dhaka Platoon	C	৳1,200,000
Aliss Islam	Khulna Tigers	D	৳800,000
Nahidul Islam	Rajshahi Royals	C	৳1,200,000
Sanjit Saha	Rangpur Rangers	D	৳800,000
Ryan Burl	Chattogram Challengers	C	US$30,000
Shahid Afridi	Dhaka Platoon	A+	US$100,000
Junaid Khan	Rangpur Rangers	C	US$30,000
Rahmanullah Gurbaz	Khulna Tigers	D	US$20,000
Jeevan Mendis	Sylhet Thunder	C	US$30,000
Imad Wasim	Chattogram Challengers	B	US$50,000
Luis Reece	Dhaka Platoon	D	US$20,000

== Direct signings ==
Player	Team	Grade	Base price	Notes/Ref
Lendl Simmons	Chattogram Challengers	—N/a		
Jubair Hossain	Chattogram Challengers	D	৳800,000	
Andre Russell	Rajshahi Royals	—N/a		
Shoaib Malik (Note: Malik withdrew his name from draft list just before the auction and later was directly signed)	Rajshahi Royals	—N/a		
Sheldon Cottrell	Sylhet Thunder	B	US$50,000	
Ebadot Hossain	Sylhet Thunder	C	৳1,200,000	
Mohammad Musa	Chattogram Challengers	D	US$20,000	
Mohammad Sami	Sylhet Thunder	D	US$20,000	
Mohammad Shahzad	Rangpur Rangers	B	US$50,000	replacement of Shai Hope
Andre Fletcher	Sylhet Thunder	B	US$50,000	
Tom Abell	Rangpur Rangers	C	US$30,000	
Chadwick Walton	Chattogram Challengers	C	US$30,000	
Krishmar Santokie	Sylhet Thunder	D	US$20,000	replacement of Sheldon Cottrell
Ifran Hossain	Cumilla Warriors	D	৳800,000	
Bhanuka Rajapaksha	Cumilla Warriors	C	US$30,000	
Shadab Khan	Dhaka Platoon	—N/a		
Stiaan van Zyl	Cumilla Warriors	D	US$20,000	
Wanindu Hasaranga	Khulna Tigers	B	US$50,000	
Abdul Mazid	Sylhet Thunder	C	৳1,200,000	
Nazmul Hossain Milon	Sylhet Thunder	D	৳800,000	
Mukidul Islam	Rangpur Rangers	D	৳800,000	
Mohammad Shahid	Dhaka Platoon	C	৳1,200,000	replacement of Wahab Riaz
Salauddin Sakil	Dhaka Platoon	D	৳800,000	
Mehedi Hasan Rana	Chattogram Challengers	C	৳1,200,000	
Liam Plunkett	Chattogram Challengers	—N/a		replacement of Kesrick Williams
Shane Watson	Rangpur Rangers	—N/a		
Upul Tharanga	Cumilla Warriors	B	US$50,000	
Shadman Islam	Rangpur Rangers	D	৳1,200,000	
David Wiese	Cumilla Warriors	B	US$50,000	
Robiul Islam Robi	Cumilla Warriors	D	৳800,000	
Ziaur Rahman	Chattogram Challengers	C	৳1,200,000	
Asela Gunaratne	Chattogram Challengers	B	US$50,000	
Hashim Amla	Khulna Tigers	—N/a		
Ahmed Shehzad	Dhaka Platoon	B	US$50,000	replacement of Laurie Evans
Faheem Ashraf	Dhaka Platoon	—N/a		

== See also ==
- 2019–20 Bangladesh Premier League
