= Zakirul Ahmed =

Bangladeshi cricketer

Personal information
- Born: 8 December 1992 (age 33); Dinajpur, Bangladesh
- Nickname: Gem
- Batting: Right-handed
- Bowling: Right-arm medium-pace

Domestic team information
- Years: Team
- 2021–22: City Club
- 2022–23: Dhaka Leopards
- 2023–24: Brothers Union

Career statistics
Competition	List A
Matches	25
Runs scored	601
Batting average	24.04
100s/50s	1/2
Top score	114
Balls bowled	12
Wickets	0
Bowling average	–
5 wickets in innings	0
10 wickets in match	0
Best bowling	–
Catches/stumpings	8/–
- Source: Cricinfo, 12 May 2025

Zakirul Ahmed (born 8 December 1992) is a Bangladeshi cricketer from Dinajpur.

== Career ==
Zakirul Ahmed made his List A debut in March 2022 for City Club in the 2021–22 Dhaka Premier Division Cricket League. In his second match he scored a century: 114 against Rupganj Tigers. It was the first century at List A level for City Club. In his fourth match he won the Player of the Match award for his 72 and two catches in City Club's first victory, when they beat Khelaghar Samaj Kallyan Samity by one wicket with one ball to spare on 3 April.
