= Chirag Jani (cricketer) =

Indian cricketer (born 1989)

Personal information
- Full name: Chirag Sureshbhai Jani
- Born: 9 November 1989 (age 37); Vartej, Bhavnagar, Gujarat, India
- Batting: Right-handed
- Bowling: Right-arm medium
- Role: All-rounder

Domestic team information
- Years: Team
- 2011/12–present: Saurashtra
- 2018/19: Brothers Union
- 2021/22–2022/23: Legends of Rupganj

Career statistics
Competition	FC	LA	T20
Matches	93	137	70
Runs scored	4,219	3,976	729
Batting average	34.86	46.77	24.30
100s/50s	8/19	1/33	0/1
Top score	235	122	80*
Balls bowled	8,507	5,721	1,346
Wickets	102	149	61
Bowling average	38.49	32.51	27.86
5 wickets in innings	2	2	0
10 wickets in match	0	–	–
Best bowling	5/22	5/15	3/19
Catches/stumpings	32/–	47/–	27/–
- Source: Cricinfo, 18 August 2026

Chirag Sureshbhai Jani (born 9 November 1989) is an Indian cricketer who has played for Saurashtra in domestic cricket since the 2011–12 season. He is a right-handed batsman and right-arm medium-pace bowler. He has also played List A cricket in the Dhaka Premier Division Cricket League in Bangladesh for Brothers Union and Legends of Rupganj.

Jani's highest first-class score is 235, which he made when Saurashtra defeated Orissa by an innings and 131 runs in the Ranji Trophy in February 2022. His best first-class bowling figures are 5 for 22 against Jharkhand in the Ranji Trophy in 2023–24.

In List A cricket, Jani's highest score is 122 for Legends of Rupganj against Rupganj Tigers in the 2021–22 Dhaka Premier Division Cricket League when he took Legends of Rupganj to victory by three wickets and won the player of the match award. He took his best List A figures a month later: 5 for 15 against Gazi Group Cricketers. He won the award for the player of the tournament in the 2022–23 Dhaka Premier Division Cricket League when he scored 669 runs at 60.81 and took 24 wickets at 24.83 for Legends of Rupganj.
