= Jawad Royen =

Bangladeshi cricketer

Personal information
- Full name: Jawad Mohammad Royen
- Born: 16 May 1992 (age 34); Jessore, Bangladesh
- Batting: Right-handed
- Bowling: Right-arm off-spin

Domestic team information
- Years: Team
- 2021–22: City Club
- 2022–23: Khulna Division

Career statistics
Competition	FC	List A
Matches	7	28
Runs scored	143	599
Batting average	15.88	26.04
100s/50s	0/1	0/3
Top score	50	79*
Balls bowled	68	1,224
Wickets	3	22
Bowling average	23.00	41.13
5 wickets in innings	0	0
10 wickets in match	0	–
Best bowling	2/17	3/31
Catches/stumpings	5/–	11/–
- Source: Cricinfo, 24 March 2025

Jawad Royen (born 16 May 1992) is a Bangladeshi cricketer from Jessore.

Jawad Royen made his List A debut when he captained City Club in their inaugural List A match in the 2021–22 Dhaka Premier Division Cricket League on 15 March 2022, in which he was the side's top scorer with 37 not out. On 9 April he won the Player of the Match award when he scored 79 not out to take City Club to a three-wicket victory over Brothers Union off the final ball of the 50th over. He captained City Club throughout their 2021–22 debut tournament; they finished tenth, enabling them to remain in the competition for the following season. He made his first-class debut on 26 October 2022, for Khulna Division in the 2022–23 National Cricket League.
