= Ziaur Rahman (Bangladeshi cricketer) =

Bangladeshi cricketer (born 1986)

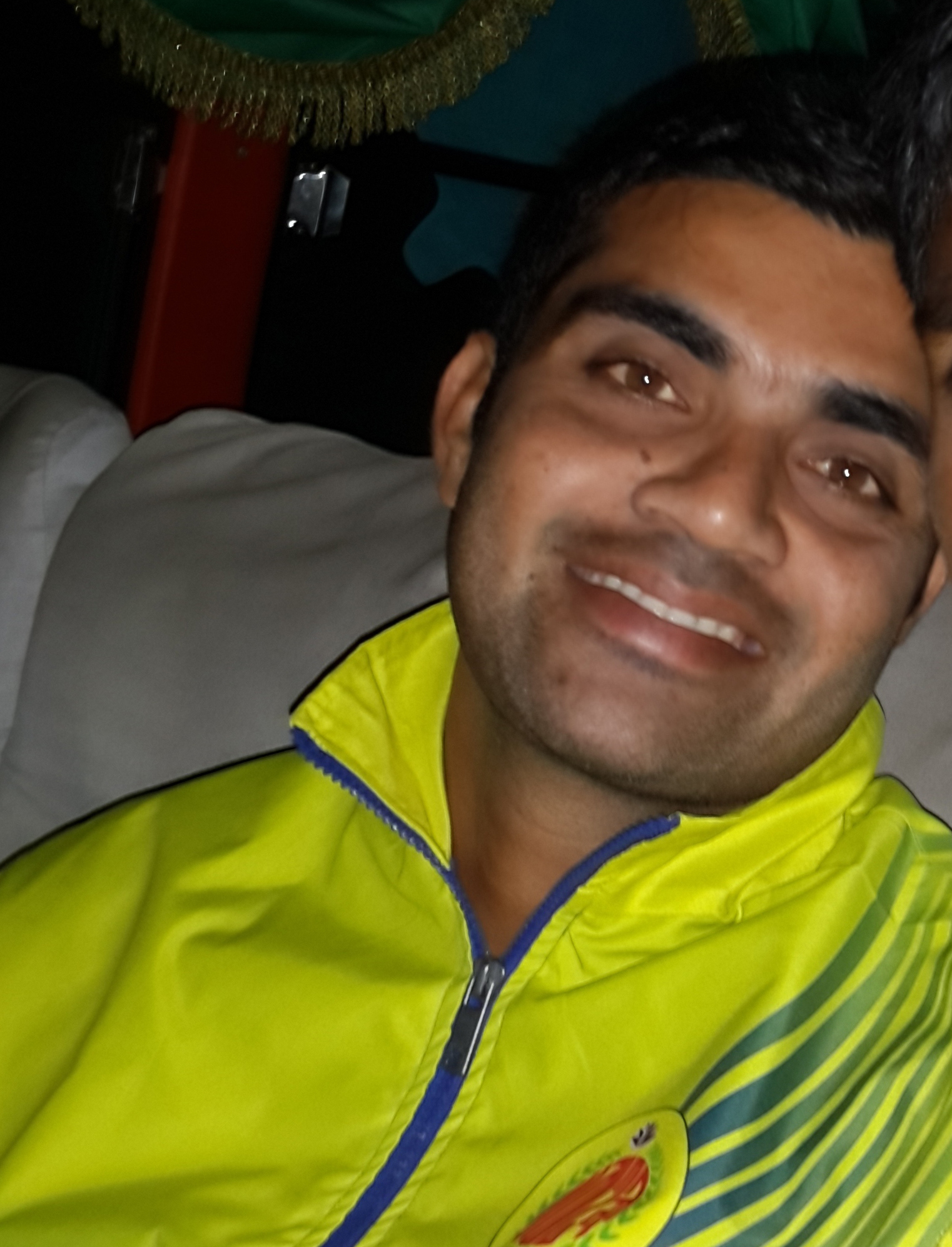

Personal information
- Full name: Ziaur Rahman
- Born: 2 December 1986 (age 39); Khulna, Bangladesh
- Nickname: Joni
- Batting: Right-handed
- Bowling: Right-arm fast-medium
- Role: Bowler

International information
- National side: Bangladesh (2012-2014)
- Only Test (cap 68): 25 April 2013 v Zimbabwe
- ODI debut (cap 106): 23 March 2013 v Sri Lanka
- Last ODI: 17 June 2014 v India
- ODI shirt no.: 16
- T20I debut (cap 32): 18 July 2012 v Ireland
- Last T20I: 30 March 2014 v Pakistan

Career statistics
Competition	Test	ODI	FC	LA
Matches	1	13	154	214
Runs scored	14	124	5,655	3,333
Batting average	14	11.27	26.67	22.07
100s/50s	0/0	0/0	8/28	2/15
Top score	14	41	167	104*
Balls bowled	180	390	12,905	5,119
Wickets	4	10	250	119
Bowling average	17.75	30.10	24.79	34.31
5 wickets in innings	0	1	6	3
10 wickets in match	0	0	0	0
Best bowling	4/63	5/30	5/36	5/23
Catches/stumpings	0/–	5/–	80/–	70/–
Medal record
Representing Bangladesh
Men's Cricket
Asian Games
Bronze medal – third place	2014 Incheon	Team
- Source: ESPNcricinfo, 5 June 2026

Mohammad Ziaur Rahman (Bengali: মোহাম্মদ জিয়াউর রহমান; born 2 December 1986 in Khulna) is a first-class and List A cricketer from Bangladesh. He is a right-handed batsman and right arm fast medium bowler. He is known as the "Hit man" of Bangladesh Cricket for his six hitting ability.

== Debut years ==
He made his debut for Khulna Division in 2004/05 and played through the 2006/07 season. He also appeared for Bangladesh Under-19s in 2003/04 and the Bangladesh Cricket Board President's XI and Bangladesh Cricket Board Academy in 2006/07.

== Domestic career ==
In Bangladesh Cricket League 2012, he scored unbeaten 152 off 118 balls vs South Zone, where he smashed 15 sixes. Highest by any Bangladeshi player in any cricket format.

He has twice taken 5 wickets in an innings, with a best of 5 for 82 against Dhaka Division. He also took 5 for 24 against Sylhet Division in a one-day game. He made his ODI debut on 23 March 2013 against Sri Lanka in Hambantota and scored a golden duck.

=== Bangladesh Premier League ===
==== Chittagong Kings ====
The Bangladesh Cricket Board founded the six-team Bangladesh Premier League in 2012, a twenty20 tournament to be held in February that year. In the auction Ziaur was bought by Chittagong Kings for $40,000. He scored 129 in 7 innings in an average of 25.80. His highest individual score was 48*.

==== Duronto Rajshahi ====
In the 2013 Bangladesh Premier League player auction he was bought by Duronto Rajshahi for $137,000. He scored 155 runs in 10 innings in an average of 19.37. His best score was 36.

==== Chittagong Vikings ====
He played 2015 BPL for Chittagong Vikings, where he scored 83 runs in 7 innings with the average of 16.60 and best of 39*. He also took 2 wickets in 3 innings in an average of 36.00. His best bowling figure was 2/24.

==== Rangpur Riders ====
In 2016–17 Bangladesh Premier League Players draft he was selected to play for Rangpur Riders. On 30 November 2016, he scored his maiden BPL fifty where he scored 60 runs off just 43 deliveries hitting 3 sixes and 6 boundaries in an strike rate of 139.53. He scored 128 runs in 5 innings in an average of 64.00 including 1 fifty in that season. He also took 2 wickets in 3 innings in an average of 24.50. His best bowling figure was 2/22.

He was retained by Rangpur Riders for 2017 BPL. He scored 77 runs in 7 innings in an average of 15.40. His top score was 36.

==== Comilla Victorians ====
In October 2018, he was named in the squad for the Comilla Victorians team, following the draft for the 2018–19 Bangladesh Premier League. He scored 38 runs in 4 innings in an average of 9.50. His highest individual score was 21.

==== Chattogram Challengers ====
In 2019–20 Bangladesh Premier League players' draft he was bought by Chattogram Challengers. He scored 72 runs in 4 innings in an average of 36.00 and strike rate of 153.19. His best score was 34*. He also took 7 wickets in 6 innings with the ball in an average of 21.14. On 7 January 2020, in a league stage match against Rajshahi Royals he took 3 wickets for 18 runs which was his best bowling figure in BPL.

==== Fortune Barishal ====
He was selected to play for Fortune Barishal in 2022 BPL. He did not have a very good season as he scored only 55 runs in 6 innings with the best of 19*.

==== Chattogram Challengers ====
Ziaur played the 2023 BPL for Chattogram Challengers. He was also captained the side at the last match of league stage of that season. He scored 151 runs in 7 innings in an average of 30.20 and strike rate of 154.08. His highest individual score was 47*. He also took 8 wickets in 7 innings in an average of 19.25. His best bowling figure was 2/15.

In the following season he was selected to play for Chattogram Challengers again. He couldn't play the whole season due to personal reasons. He played only 2 matches and scored 15 runs and also took a wicket.

==== Khulna Tigers ====
He played the 2025 Bangladesh Premier League for Khulna Tigers. He scored 26 runs in 2 innings and took 5 wickets in 4 innings with the best of 2/39.

==== Chattogram Royals ====
In the 2026 Bangladesh Premier League player auction he was bought by Chattogram Royals for ৳30 lakh.

== International career ==
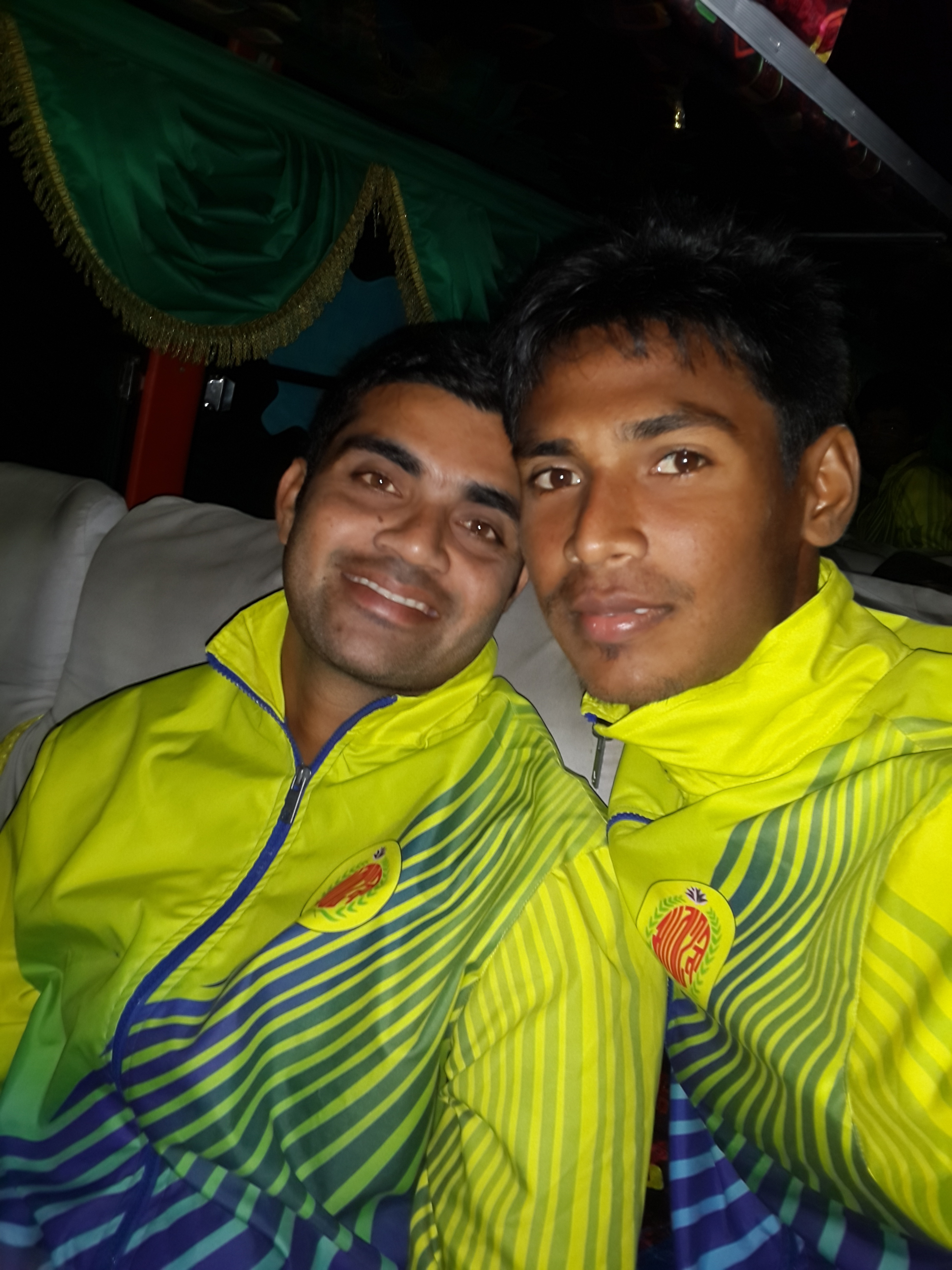
Ziaur Rahman with Mustafizur Rahman
