= Qazi Onik =

Bangladeshi cricketer

Personal information
- Full name: Qazi Onik Islam
- Born: 18 March 1999 (age 27); Dhaka, Bangladesh
- Batting: Left-handed
- Bowling: Left-arm medium-fast
- Role: Bowler

Domestic team information
- Years: Team
- 2017: Rajshahi Kings
- Source: Cricinfo, 7 January 2021

Qazi Onik (born 18 March 1999) is a Bangladeshi cricketer. A left-arm medium-fast bowler, he made his Twenty20 debut for Rajshahi Kings on 29 November 2017 in the 2017–18 Bangladesh Premier League.

In December 2017, he was named in Bangladesh's squad for the 2018 Under-19 Cricket World Cup. He was the leading wicket-taker for Bangladesh in the tournament, with 10 wickets.

In February 2018, took his first five-wicket haul in List A cricket, bowling for Mohammedan Sporting Club against Legends of Rupganj in the 2017–18 Dhaka Premier Division Cricket League. He finished the 2017–18 Dhaka Premier Division Cricket League as the leading wicket-taker for Mohammedan Sporting Club, with 28 dismissals in 11 matches.

He made his first-class debut for Dhaka Metropolis in the 2018–19 National Cricket League on 1 October 2018. Later the same month, he was named in the squad for the Dhaka Dynamites team, following the draft for the 2018–19 Bangladesh Premier League.

In December 2018, he was named in Bangladesh's team for the 2018 ACC Emerging Teams Asia Cup. In November 2019, he failed a dope test during the 2019–20 National Cricket League. As a result, he was removed from the player's draft for the 2019–20 Bangladesh Premier League. In July 2020, he was given a two-year ban for failing the dope test.
