= 2017–18 Bangladesh Premier League =

Cricket Tournament

2017 Bangladesh Premier League
- 2017 BPL Logo
- Dates: 4 November 2017 – 12 December 2017
- Administrator: Bangladesh Cricket Board
- Cricket format: Twenty20
- Tournament format(s): Double round-robin and playoffs
- Host: Bangladesh
- Champions: Rangpur Riders (1st title)
- Runners-up: Dhaka Dynamites
- Participants: 7
- Matches: 46
- Player of the series: Chris Gayle (Rangpur Riders)
- Most runs: Chris Gayle (Rangpur Riders) (485)
- Most wickets: Shakib Al Hasan (Dhaka Dynamites) (22)
- Official website: BPL

The Bangladesh Premier League 2017, also known as BPL Season 5 or AKS BPL 2017 Powered by Shah Cement (for sponsorship reasons), was the fifth season of the Bangladesh Premier League (BPL), the top level professional Twenty20 cricket franchise league in Bangladesh. The competition was organised by the Bangladesh Cricket Board (BCB) and featured seven teams from seven different cities. The season began on 4 November, and ended on 12 December 2017, with the defending champion, Dhaka Dynamites playing against newbies Sylhet Sixers in the first game at Sylhet International Cricket Stadium.

Barisal Bulls were excluded from the tournament, after failing financial terms and conditions. This year, Pakistani players, except retired and non-centrally-contracted were unavailable in the tournament till 17 November due to their domestic cricket league.

In the championship match, Rangpur Riders defeated Dhaka Dynamites to win their first title. In the final match Chris Gayle was awarded the man of the match award and also won player of the series award. He was the leading run scorer in the tournament with 485 runs. Shakib Al Hasan was the leading wicket taker with 22 wickets.

== Draft and squads ==
The 2017 BPL draft was held on 16 September 2017, where a team could purchase 7 local players and 2 overseas players at least. A new rule has been implemented whereby a team can include up to 5 overseas players in a match instead of up to 4.

A total of 66 players were signed in the event including 51 locals and 15 from abroad. Rangpur Riders signed the most players reaching a tally of 16. The first local and overseas player call went to Rajshahi Kings as the picked Mustafizur Rahman and Usama Mir.

Dhaka Dynamites Coach: Khaled Mahmud	Chittagong Vikings Coach: Simon Helmot	Sylhet Sixers Coach: Waqar Younis	Khulna Titans Coach: Mahela Jayawardene	Rajshahi Kings Coach: Lance Klusener	Rangpur Riders Coach: Tom Moody	Comilla Victorians Coach: Mohammad Salahuddin
Shakib Al Hasan (c); Kumar Sangakkara; Cameron Delport; Joe Denly; Jahurul Islam; Evin Lewis; Nadif Chowdhury; Rovman Powell; Shadman Islam; Abu Hider Rony; Kevon Cooper; Mosaddek Hossain; Sunil Narine; Kieron Pollard; Shahid Afridi; Ronsford Beaton; Akeal Hosein; Khaled Ahmed; Mohammad Amir; Mohammad Shahid; Saqlain Sajib; Shaheen Afridi; Mehedi Maruf; Saddam Hossain	Misbah-ul-Haq (c); Anamul Haque Bijoy; Dilshan Munaweera; Luke Ronchi; Soumya Sarkar; Najibullah Zadran; Irfan Shukkur; Liam Dawson; Sikander Raza; Luis Reece; Stiaan van Zyl; Nayeem Hasan; Tanbir Hayder; Taskin Ahmed; Yasir Arafat; Alauddin Babu; Suhrawadi Shuvo; Sunzamul Islam; Al-Amin; Sajjadul Haque; Subashis Roy	Nasir Hossain (c); Babar Azam; Andre Fletcher; Upul Tharanga; Danushka Gunathilaka; Ross Whiteley; Andre McCarthy; Nurul Hasan Sohan; Chaturanga de Silva; Sabbir Rahman; Dasun Shanaka; Sharifullah; Shuvagata Hom; Taijul Islam; Abul Hasan; Nabil Samad; Liam Plunkett; Krishmar Santokie; Kamrul Islam Rabbi; Usman Shinwari; Ghulam Mudassar; Imtiaz Hossain; Mohammad Sharif	Mahmudullah (c); Michael Klinger; Najmul Hossain Shanto; Saif Hassan; Dhiman Ghosh; Nicholas Pooran; Rilee Rossouw; Sarfaraz Ahmed; Chadwick Walton; Yasir Ali; Afif Hossain; Ariful Haque; Carlos Brathwaite; Akila Dananjaya; Benny Howell; Shehan Jayasuriya; Mosharraf Hossain; Muktar Ali; Seekkuge Prasanna; Shadab Khan; Kyle Abbott; Abu Jayed; Jofra Archer; Junaid Khan; Shafiul Islam; Tanvir Islam; Imran Ali	Darren Sammy (c); Rony Talukder; Zakir Hasan; Lendl Simmons; Luke Wright; Mominul Haque; Mushfiqur Rahim; Farhad Reza; James Franklin; Mehidy Hasan Miraz; Malcolm Waller; Samit Patel; Mohammad Sami; Mustafizur Rahman; Nihaduzzaman; Qazi Onik; Usama Mir; Kesrick Williams; Hossain Ali; Naeem Islam Jnr; Raza Ali Dar	Mashrafe Mortaza (c); Chris Gayle; Brendon McCullum; Johnson Charles; Adam Lyth; Sam Hain; Mohammad Mithun; Kusal Perera; Shahriar Nafees; Shamsur Rahman; Ravi Bopara; Fazle Mahmud; Nahidul Islam; Thisara Perera; Samiullah Shinwari; Ziaur Rahman; Sohag Gazi; David Willey; Abdur Razzak; Samuel Badree; Ebadot Hossain; Elias Sunny; Nuwan Kulasekara; Lasith Malinga; Nazmul Islam; Rubel Hossain; Zahir Khan	Tamim Iqbal (c); Imrul Kayes; Fakhar Zaman; Litton Das; Darren Bravo; Jos Buttler; Solomon Mire; Marlon Samuels; Colin Munro; Raqibul Hasan; Alok Kapali; Dwayne Bravo; Faheem Ashraf; Mahedi Hasan; Mohammad Nabi; Mohammad Saifuddin; Rashid Khan; Shoaib Malik; Al Amin Hossain; Arafat Sunny; Graeme Cremer; Enamul Haque Jnr.; Hassan Ali; Imran Khan; Mehedi Hasan Rana; Rumman Raees

== Venues ==
A total of 46 matches were played, with the playoffs and final held in Dhaka.

Chittagong	Dhaka	Sylhet
Zohur Ahmed Chowdhury Stadium	Sher-e-Bangla Cricket Stadium	Sylhet International Cricket Stadium
Capacity: 20,000	Capacity: 26,000	Capacity: 18,500
Matches: 10	Matches: 28	Matches: 8
Zahur Ahmed Chowdhury Stadium	Sher-e-Bangla National Cricket Stadium	Sylhet International Cricket Stadium
2017–18 Bangladesh Premier League is located in Bangladesh

== Results ==
=== Points table ===
Pos	Team	Pld	W	L	NR	Pts	NRR
1	Comilla Victorians (3)	12	9	3	0	18	0.578
2	Dhaka Dynamites (R)	12	7	4	1	15	1.631
3	Khulna Titans (4)	12	7	4	1	15	0.075
4	Rangpur Riders (C)	12	6	6	0	12	−0.267
5	Sylhet Sixers	12	4	7	1	9	−0.429
6	Rajshahi Kings	12	4	8	0	8	−1.098
7	Chittagong Vikings	12	3	8	1	7	−0.473

Source: Cricinfo.com
- The top four teams qualified for the playoffs
- advanced to the Qualifier 1
- advanced to the Eliminator

=== League Progression ===
	League matches												Playoffs		
Team	1	2	3	4	5	6	7	8	9	10	11	12	Q1/E	Q2	F
Chittagong Vikings	0	2	2	2	3	3	5	5	5	5	5	7			
Comilla Victorians	0	2	4	6	8	10	10	12	14	16	16	18	L	L	
Dhaka Dynamites	0	2	4	6	7	9	9	9	11	11	13	15	W		L
Khulna Titans	0	2	4	4	5	7	9	11	13	13	13	15	L		
Rajshahi Kings	0	0	2	2	4	4	4	6	6	8	8	8			
Rangpur Riders	2	2	2	2	4	6	6	8	10	10	12	12	W	W	W
Sylhet Sixers	2	4	6	6	6	7	7	7	7	7	9	9			

Win	Loss	No result

Note: The total points at the end of each group match are listed.
Note: Click on the points (group matches) or W/L (Playoffs) to see the match summary.

== League stage ==
A total of 42 matches were played in the League stage, with the first eight held in Sylhet, followed by 16 in Dhaka, then ten in Chittagong, and the final eight in Dhaka.

=== Phase 1 (Sylhet) ===
4 November 2017
2:00 pm
Scorecard

Dhaka Dynamites; 139/7 (20 overs)	v	Sylhet Sixers; 143/1 (12.5 overs)
Kumar Sangakkara 32 (28); Liam Plunkett 2/20 (4 overs)		Upul Tharanga 69* (38); Adil Rashid 1/31 (4 overs)

Sylhet won by 9 wickets
Sylhet International Cricket Stadium, Sylhet
Umpires: Masudur Rahman (Ban) and Riazuddin (Pak)
Player of the match: Upul Tharanga (Sylhet Sixers)

- Sylhet Sixers won the toss and elected to field.

4 November 2017
7:00 pm (D/N)
Scorecard

Rajshahi Kings; 154/8 (20 overs)	v	Rangpur Riders; 155/4 (18.5 overs)
Rony Talukdar 47 (38); Nazmul Islam 2/20 (4 overs)		Mohammad Mithun 46 (33); James Franklin 1/26 (3 overs)

Rangpur won by 6 wickets
Sylhet International Cricket Stadium, Sylhet
Umpires: Mahfuzur Rahman (Ban) and Tanvir Ahmed (Ban)
Player of the match: Ravi Bopara (Rangpur Riders)

- Rangpur Riders won the toss and elected to field.
- Nihaduzzaman (Rajshahi Kings) made his T20 debut.

5 November 2017
2:00 pm
Scorecard

Comilla Victorians; 145/6 (20 overs)	v	Sylhet Sixers; 148/6 (19.5 overs)
Marlon Samuels 60 (47); Taijul Islam 2/22 (4 overs)		Upul Tharanga 51 (40); Dwayne Bravo 2/34 (3.5 overs)

Sylhet won by 4 wickets
Sylhet International Cricket Stadium, Sylhet
Umpires: Mahfuzur Rahman (Ban) and Masudur Rahman (Ban)
Player of the match: Upul Tharanga (Sylhet Sixers)

- Sylhet Sixers won the toss and elected to field.

5 November 2017
7:00 pm (D/N)
Scorecard

Dhaka Dynamites; 202/7 (20 overs)	v	Khulna Titans; 137 (18.1 overs)
Evin Lewis 66 (40); Abu Jayed 2/29 (4 overs)		Jofra Archer 36 (24); Abu Hider 3/13 (3 overs)

Dhaka won by 65 runs
Sylhet International Cricket Stadium, Sylhet
Umpires: Akteruzzaman (Ban) and Riazuddin (Pak)
Player of the match: Cameron Delport (Dhaka Dynamites)

- Khulna Titans won the toss and elected to field.
- Khaled Ahmed (Dhaka Dynamites) made his T20 debut.

7 November 2017
2:00 pm
Scorecard

Chittagong Vikings; 143/7 (20 overs)	v	Comilla Victorians; 144/2 (17.2 overs)
Luke Ronchi 40 (21); Mohammad Saifuddin 3/24 (4 overs)		Jos Buttler 48 (42); Subashis Roy 2/24 (3.2 overs)

Comilla won by 8 wickets
Sylhet International Cricket Stadium, Sylhet
Umpires: Masudur Rahman (Ban) and Sharfuddoula (Ban)
Player of the match: Mohammad Saifuddin (Comilla Victorians)

- Comilla Victorians won the toss and elected to field.

7 November 2017
7:00 pm (D/N)
Scorecard

Sylhet Sixers; 205/6 (20 overs)	v	Rajshahi Kings; 172/8 (20 overs)
Upul Tharanga 50 (37); Kesrick Williams 2/39 (4 overs)		Luke Wright 56 (39); Abul Hasan 3/22 (4 overs)

Sylhet won by 33 runs
Sylhet International Cricket Stadium, Sylhet
Umpires: Anisur Rahman (Ban) and Riazuddin (Pak)
Player of the match: Danushka Gunathilaka (Sylhet Sixers)

- Rajshahi Kings won the toss and elected to field.
- Hossain Ali (Rajshahi Kings) made his T20 debut.

8 November 2017
2:00 pm
Scorecard

Chittagong Vikings; 166/4 (20 overs)	v	Rangpur Riders; 155/8 (20 overs)
Luke Ronchi 78 (35); Ravi Bopara 2/14 (3 overs)		Ravi Bopara 38 (32); Taskin Ahmed 3/31 (4 overs)

Chittagong won by 11 runs
Sylhet International Cricket Stadium, Sylhet
Umpires: Riazuddin (Pak) and Sharfuddoula (Ban)
Player of the match: Taskin Ahmed (Chittagong Vikings)

- Rangpur Riders won the toss and elected to field.

8 November 2017
7:00 pm (D/N)
Scorecard

Sylhet Sixers; 135/5 (20 overs)	v	Khulna Titans; 138/4 (18 overs)
Nasir Hossain 47* (35); Mahmudullah 2/12 (3 overs)		Michael Klinger 47* (36); Taijul Islam 3/19 (4 overs)

Khulna won by 6 wickets
Sylhet International Cricket Stadium, Sylhet
Umpires: Anisur Rahman (Ban) and Masudur Rahman (Ban)
Player of the match: Mahmudullah (Khulna Titans)

- Khulna Titans won the toss and elected to field.

=== Phase 2 (Dhaka) ===
11 November 2017
1:00 pm
Scorecard

Rangpur Riders; 134/5 (20 overs)	v	Rajshahi Kings; 138/2 (16.4 overs)
Ravi Bopara 54* (51); Farhad Reza 2/28 (4 overs)		Mominul Haque 63* (44); Thisara Perera 1/12 (2 overs)

Rajshahi won by 8 wickets
Sher-e-Bangla National Cricket Stadium, Dhaka
Umpires: Anisur Rahman (Ban) and Riazuddin (Pak)
Player of the match: Mominul Haque (Rajshahi Kings)

- Rangpur Riders won the toss and elected to bat.

11 November 2017
6:00 pm (D/N)
Scorecard

Sylhet Sixers; 101/9 (20 overs)	v	Dhaka Dynamites; 106/2 (7.5 overs)
Abul Hasan 30* (26); Shahid Afridi 4/12 (4 overs)		Evin Lewis 44* (18); Tim Bresnan 2/20 (2 overs)

Dhaka won by 8 wickets
Sher-e-Bangla National Cricket Stadium, Dhaka
Umpires: Ranmore Martinesz (SL) and Nadir Shah (Ban)
Player of the match: Shahid Afridi (Dhaka Dynamites)

- Dhaka Dynamites won the toss and elected to field.
- Wanidu Hasaranga (Sylhet Sixers) made his T20 debut.
- This was the fastest victory in BPL history.

12 November 2017
1:00 pm
Scorecard

Khulna Titans; 170/7 (20 overs)	v	Chittagong Vikings; 152/7 (20 overs)
Ariful Haque 40 (25); Taskin Ahmed 3/43 (4 overs)		Sikandar Raza 37 (27); Abu Jayed 4/35 (4 overs)

Khulna won by 18 runs
Sher-e-Bangla National Cricket Stadium, Dhaka
Umpires: Mahfuzur Rahman (Ban) and Ranmore Martinesz (SL)
Player of the match: Abu Jayed (Khulna Titans)

- Chittagong Vikings won the toss and elected to field.

12 November 2017
6:00 pm (D/N)
Scorecard

Rajshahi Kings; 115/7 (20 overs)	v	Comilla Victorians; 120/1 (15.1 overs)
Lendl Simmons 40° (23); Mohammad Nabi 3/15 (4 overs)		Jos Buttler 50* (39); Farhad Reza 1/31 (2 overs)

Comilla won by 9 wickets
Sher-e-Bangla National Cricket Stadium, Dhaka
Umpires: Masudur Rahman (Ban) and Riazuddin (Pak)
Player of the match: Rashid Khan (Comilla Victorians)

- Comilla Victorians won the toss and elected to field.

14 November 2017
1:00 pm
Scorecard

Khulna Titans; 156/5 (20 overs)	v	Dhaka Dynamites; 157/6 (19.5 overs)
Carlos Brathwaite 64* (29); Abu Hider 2/40 (4 overs)		Kieron Pollard 55 (24); Shafiul Islam 2/24 (4 overs)

Dhaka won by 4 wickets
Sher-e-Bangla National Cricket Stadium, Dhaka
Umpires: Mahfuzur Rahman (Ban) and Ranmore Martinesz (SL)
Player of the match: Jahurul Islam (Dhaka Dynamites)

- Dhaka Dynamites won the toss and elected to field.

14 November 2017
6:00 pm (D/N)
Scorecard

Chittagong Vikings; 139/4 (20 overs)	v	Comilla Victorians; 140/4 (18.1 overs)
Luke Ronchi 31 (19); Rashid Khan 1/17 (4 overs)		Imrul Kayes 45 (36); Sunzamul Islam 2/14 (3 overs)

Comilla won by 6 wickets
Sher-e-Bangla National Cricket Stadium, Dhaka
Umpires: Riazuddin (Pak) and Sharfuddoula (Ban)
Player of the match: Imrul Kayes (Comilla Victorians)

- Comilla Victorians won the toss and elected to field.

15 November 2017
1:00 pm
Scorecard

Khulna Titans	v	Sylhet Sixers

Match abandoned
Sher-e-Bangla National Cricket Stadium, Dhaka
Umpires: Riazuddin (Pak) and Sharfuddoula (Ban)

- No toss.
- No play was possible due to rain.

15 November 2017
6:00 pm (D/N)
Scorecard

Chittagong Vikings	v	Dhaka Dynamites

Match abandoned
Sher-e-Bangla National Cricket Stadium, Dhaka
Umpires: Ranmore Martinesz (SL) and Tanvir Ahmed (Ban)

- No toss.
- No play was possible due to rain.

17 November 2017
2:00 pm
Scorecard

Sylhet Sixers; 146/6 (20 overs)	v	Rajshahi Kings; 150/3 (17.3 overs)
Sabbir Rahman 41 (26); Kesrick Williams 2/32 (4 overs)		Zakir Hasan 51* (26); Abul Hasan 1/17 (2 overs)

Rajshahi won by 7 wickets
Sher-e-Bangla National Cricket Stadium, Dhaka
Umpires: Mahfuzur Rahman (Ban) and Ranmore Martinesz (SL)
Player of the match: Zakir Hasan (Rajshahi Kings)

- Rajshahi Kings won the toss and elected to field.

17 November 2017
7:00 pm (D/N)
Scorecard

Chittagong Vikings; 160/5 (20 overs)	v	Khulna Titans; 164/5 (18.2 overs)
Anamul Haque 62 (47); Abu Jayed 3/26 (4 overs)		Rilee Rossouw 49 (26); Al-Amin 1/14 (2 overs)

Khulna won by 5 wickets
Sher-e-Bangla National Cricket Stadium, Dhaka
Umpires: Nadir Shah (Ban) and Riazuddin (Pak)
Player of the match: Rilee Rossouw (Khulna Titans)

- Khulna Titans won the toss and elected to field.

18 November 2017
1:00 pm
Scorecard

Dhaka Dynamites; 201/7 (20 overs)	v	Rajshahi Kings; 133 (18.2 overs)
Evin Lewis 64 (38); Hossain Ali 3/38 (4 overs)		Zakir Hasan 36 (23); Shahid Afridi 4/26 (4 overs)

Dhaka won by 68 runs
Sher-e-Bangla National Cricket Stadium, Dhaka
Umpires: Nadir Shah (Ban) and Riazuddin (Pak)
Player of the match: Evin Lewis (Dhaka Dynamites)

- Rajshahi Kings won the toss and elected to field.

18 November 2017
6:00 pm (D/N)
Scorecard

Comilla Victorians; 153/6 (20 overs)	v	Rangpur Riders; 139/7 (20 overs)
Imrul Kayes 47 (32); Mashrafe Mortaza 2/22 (4 overs)		Ravi Bopara 48* (48); Mahedi Hasan 2/15 (4 overs)

Comilla won by 14 runs
Sher-e-Bangla National Cricket Stadium, Dhaka
Umpires: Mahfuzur Rahman (Ban) and Ranmore Martinesz (SL)
Player of the match: Mahedi Hasan (Comilla Victorians)

- Rangpur Riders won the toss and elected to field.

20 November 2017
1:00 pm
Scorecard

Dhaka Dynamites; 128 (18.3 overs)	v	Comilla Victorians; 129/6 (19.4 overs)
Sunil Narine 76 (45); Hasan Ali 5/20 (3.3 overs)		Shoaib Malik 54* (53); Sunil Narine 2/17 (4 overs)

Comilla won by 4 wickets
Sher-e-Bangla National Cricket Stadium, Dhaka
Umpires: Ranmore Martinesz (SL) and Masudur Rahman (Ban)
Player of the match: Hasan Ali (Comilla Victorians)

- Dhaka Dynamites won the toss and elected to bat.

20 November 2017
6:00 pm (D/N)
Scorecard

Rangpur Riders; 169/7 (20 overs)	v	Sylhet Sixers; 162/4 (20 overs)
Chris Gayle 50 (39); Abul Hasan 2/24 (4 overs)		Sabbir Rahman 70 (49); Sohag Gazi 1/6 (1 over)

Rangpur won by 7 runs
Sher-e-Bangla National Cricket Stadium, Dhaka
Umpires: Anisur Rahman (Ban) and Riazuddin (Pak)
Player of the match: Chris Gayle (Rangpur Riders)

- Sylhet Sixers won the toss and elected to field.

21 November 2017
1:00 pm
Scorecard

Rajshahi Kings; 166/8 (20 overs)	v	Khulna Titans; 168/8 (19.2 overs)
Dwayne Smith 62 (36); Junaid Khan 4/27 (4 overs)		Mahmudullah 56 (44); Mohammad Sami 3/29 (4 overs)

Khulna won by 2 wickets
Sher-e-Bangla National Cricket Stadium, Dhaka
Umpires: Riazuddin (Pak) and Sharfuddoula (Ban)
Player of the match: Ariful Haque (Khulna Titans)

- Khulna Titans won the toss and elected to field.

21 November 2017
6:00 pm (D/N)
Scorecard

Rangpur Riders; 142 (19.5 overs)	v	Dhaka Dynamites; 139 (20 overs)
Chris Gayle 51 (28); Shakib Al Hasan 5/16 (3.5 overs)		Jahurul Islam 29 (19); Sohag Gazi 2/18 (4 overs)

Rangpur won by 3 runs
Sher-e-Bangla National Cricket Stadium, Dhaka
Umpires: Anisur Rahman (Ban) and Ranmore Martinesz (SL)
Player of the match: Chris Gayle (Rangpur Riders)

- Dhaka Dynamites won the toss and elected to field.

=== Phase 3 (Chittagong) ===
24 November 2017
2:00 pm
Scorecard

Khulna Titans; 158/8 (20 overs)	v	Rangpur Riders; 149/6 (20 overs)
Mahmudullah 59 (36); Rubel Hossain 3/35 (4 overs)		Ravi Bopara 59 (44); Afif Hossain 2/4 (2 overs)

Khulna won by 9 runs
Zohur Ahmed Chowdhury Stadium, Chittagong
Umpires: Morshed Ali Khan (Ban) and Riazuddin (Pak)
Player of the match: Mahmudullah (Khulna Titans)

- Rangpur Riders won the toss and elected to field.
- Tanvir Islam (Khulna Titans) made his T20 debut.

24 November 2017
7:00 pm (D/N)
Scorecard

Chittagong Vikings; 211/5 (20 overs)	v	Sylhet Sixers; 171/8 (20 overs)
Sikandar Raza 95 (45); Kamrul Islam 2/35 (4 overs)		Andre Fletcher 71 (46); Taskin Ahmed 3/31 (4 overs)

Chittagong won by 40 runs
Zohur Ahmed Chowdhury Stadium, Chittagong
Umpires: Anisur Rahman (Ban) and Tanvir Ahmed (Ban)
Player of the match: Sikandar Raza (Chittagong Vikings)

- Sylhet Sixers won the toss and elected to field.

25 November 2017
1:00 pm
Scorecard

Rajshahi Kings; 185/7 (20 overs)	v	Comilla Victorians; 155 (19.1 overs)
Darren Sammy 47* (14); Mohammad Saifuddin 3/50 (4 overs)		Tamim Iqbal 63 (45); Mohammad Sami 4/9 (4 overs)

Rajshahi won by 30 runs
Zohur Ahmed Chowdhury Stadium, Chittagong
Umpires: Anisur Rahman (Ban) and Morshed Ali Khan (Ban)
Player of the match: Darren Sammy (Rajshahi Kings)

- Rajshahi Kings won the toss and elected to bat.

25 November 2017
6:00 pm (D/N)
Scorecard

Chittagong Vikings; 176/7 (20 overs)	v	Rangpur Riders; 180/7 (20 overs)
Stiaan van Zyl 68 (40); Nahidul Islam 1/4 (1 over)		Mohammad Mithun 44 (29); Luis Reece 1/13 (2 overs)

Rangpur won by 3 wickets
Zohur Ahmed Chowdhury Stadium, Chittagong
Umpires: Riazuddin (Pak) and Tanvir Ahmed (Ban)
Player of the match: Mashrafe Mortaza (Rangpur Riders)

- Rangpur Riders won the toss and elected to field.

27 November 2017
1:00 pm
Scorecard

Chittagong Vikings; 187/5 (20 overs)	v	Dhaka Dynamites; 191/3 (18.5 overs)
Anamul Haque 73 (47); Sunil Narine 1/11 (4 overs)		Evin Lewis 75 (31); Tanbir Hayder 1/18 (2 overs)

Dhaka won by 7 wickets
Zohur Ahmed Chowdhury Stadium, Chittagong
Umpires: Nadir Shah (Ban) and Riazuddin (Pak)
Player of the match: Evin Lewis (Dhaka Dynamites)

- Chittagong Vikings won the toss and elected to bat.

27 November 2017
6:00 pm (D/N)
Scorecard

Khulna Titans; 213/5 (20 overs)	v	Rajshahi Kings; 145 (19 overs)
Nicholas Pooran 57 (26); James Franklin 3/50 (4 overs)		Rony Talukdar 36 (23); Shafiul Islam 5/26 (4 overs)

Khulna won by 68 runs
Zohur Ahmed Chowdhury Stadium, Chittagong
Umpires: Gazi Sohel (Ban) and Mahfuzur Rahman (Ban)
Player of the match: Nicholas Pooran (Khulna Titans)

- Rajshahi Kings won the toss and elected to field.

28 November 2017
1:00 pm
Scorecard

Sylhet Sixers; 173/5 (20 overs)	v	Rangpur Riders; 177/6 (19.4 overs)
Babar Azam 54 (37); Nazmul Islam 3/18 (4 overs)		Brendon McCullum 43 (38); Abul Hasan 1/25 (4 overs)

Rangpur won by 4 wickets.
Zohur Ahmed Chowdhury Stadium, Chittagong
Umpires: Mahfuzur Rahman (Ban) and Ranmore Martinesz (SL)
Player of the match: Nazmul Islam (Rangpur Riders)

- Rangpur Riders won the toss and elected to field.

28 November 2017
6:00 pm (D/N)
Scorecard

Khulna Titans; 111 (19.2 overs)	v	Comilla Victorians; 112/1 (13.5 overs)
Ariful Haque 24 (24); Shoaib Malik 3/14 (3 overs)		Tamim Iqbal 64* (42); Kyle Abbott 1/27 (3 overs)

Comilla won by 9 wickets
Zohur Ahmed Chowdhury Stadium, Chittagong
Umpires: Nadir Shah (Ban) and Riazuddin (Pak)
Player of the match: Shoaib Malik (Comilla Victorians)

- Khulna Titans won the toss and elected to bat.

29 November 2017
1:00 pm
Scorecard

Rajshahi Kings; 157/6 (20 overs)	v	Chittagong Vikings; 124 (19.2 overs)
Darren Sammy 40 (25); Luis Reece 3/33 (3 overs)		Stiaan van Zyl 27 (29); Qazi Onik 4/17 (3.2 overs)

Rajshahi won by 33 runs
Zohur Ahmed Chowdhury Stadium, Chittagong
Umpires: Gazi Sohel (Ban) and Mahfuzur Rahman (Ban)
Player of the match: Darren Sammy (Rajshahi Kings)

- Rajshahi Kings won the toss and elected to bat.
- Nayeem Hasan (Chittagong Vikings) and Qazi Onik (Rajshahi Kings) both made their T20 debuts.

29 November 2017
6:00 pm (D/N)
Scorecard

Comilla Victorians; 167/6 (20 overs)	v	Dhaka Dynamites; 155/8 (20 overs)
Marlon Samuels 39 (27); Kevon Cooper 3/42 (4 overs)		Joe Denly 49 (39); Dwayne Bravo 3/31 (4 overs)

Comilla won by 12 runs
Zohur Ahmed Chowdhury Stadium, Chittagong
Umpires: Nadir Shah (Ban) and Riazuddin (Pak)
Player of the match: Dwayne Bravo (Comilla Victorians)

- Dhaka Dynamites won the toss and elected to field.

=== Phase 4 (Dhaka) ===
2 December 2017
1:00 pm
Scorecard

Rangpur Riders; 97 (17.1 overs)	v	Comilla Victorians; 100/6 (19.3 overs)
Brendon McCullum 24 (31); Mahedi Hasan 4/22 (4 overs)		Tamim Iqbal 22 (22); Mashrafe Mortaza 3/24 (4 overs)

Comilla won by 4 wickets
Sher-e-Bangla National Cricket Stadium, Dhaka
Umpires: Ranmore Martinesz (SL) and Nadir Shah (Ban)
Player of the match: Mahedi Hasan (Comilla Victorians)

- Comilla Victorians won the toss and elected to field.

2 December 2017
6:00 pm (D/N)
Scorecard

Dhaka Dynamites; 205/5 (20 overs)	v	Rajshahi Kings; 106 (18.3 overs)
Sunil Narine 69 (34); Qazi Onik 2/52 (4 overs)		Samit Patel 28 (17); Shakib Al Hasan 4/8 (4 overs)

Dhaka won by 99 runs
Sher-e-Bangla National Cricket Stadium, Dhaka
Umpires: Masudur Rahman (Ban) and Riazuddin (Pak)
Player of the match: Sunil Narine (Dhaka Dynamites)

- Dhaka Dynamites won the toss and elected to bat.

3 December 2017
1:00 pm
Scorecard

Chittagong Vikings; 67 (12 overs)	v	Sylhet Sixers; 68/0 (11.1 overs)
Irfan Sukkur 15 (13); Nasir Hossain 5/31 (4 overs)		Mohammad Rizwan 36* (33); Sunzamul Islam 0/13 (3.1 overs)

Sylhet won by 10 wickets
Sher-e-Bangla National Cricket Stadium, Dhaka
Umpires: Nadir Shah (Ban) and Tanvir Ahmed (Ban)
Player of the match: Nasir Hossain (Sylhet Sixers)

- Sylhet Sixers won the toss and elected to field.
- This was concurrently the largest victory in terms of wickets in BPL history.

3 December 2017
6:00 pm (D/N)
Scorecard

Rangpur Riders; 147/6 (20 overs)	v	Khulna Titans; 128/8 (20 overs)
Mohammad Mithun 50* (35); Jofra Archer 2/28 (4 overs)		Michael Klinger 44 (45); Ravi Bopara 2/4 (2 overs)

Rangpur won by 19 runs
Sher-e-Bangla National Cricket Stadium, Dhaka
Umpires: Masudur Rahman (Ban) and Riazuddin (Pak)
Player of the match: Mohammad Mithun (Rangpur Riders)

- Khulna Titans won the toss and elected to field.

5 December 2017
1:00 pm
Scorecard

Khulna Titans; 174/6 (20 overs)	v	Comilla Victorians; 160/7 (20 overs)
Nazmul Shanto 37 (21); Al-Amin Hossain 3/52 (4 overs)		Shoaib Malik 36 (23); Benny Howell 2/32 (4 overs)

Khulna won by 14 runs
Sher-e-Bangla National Cricket Stadium, Dhaka
Umpires: Morshed Ali Khan (Ban) and Riazuddin (Pak)
Player of the match: Ariful Haque (Khulna Titans)

- Khulna Titans won the toss and elected to bat.
- Mehedi Rana (Comilla Victorians) made his T20 debut.

5 December 2017
6:00 pm (D/N)
Scorecard

Chittagong Vikings; 194/2 (20 overs)	v	Rajshahi Kings; 149/9 (20 overs)
Luis Reece 80* (56); Mehedi Hasan 2/18 (4 overs)		Samit Patel 62 (26); Sikandar Raza 4/16 (4 overs)

Chittagong won by 45 runs
Sher-e-Bangla National Cricket Stadium, Dhaka
Umpires: Mahfuzur Rahman (Ban) and Shafiuddin Ahmed (Ban)
Player of the match: Luis Reece (Chittagong Vikings)

- Rajshahi Kings won the toss and elected to field.

6 December 2017
1:00 pm
Scorecard

Dhaka Dynamites; 137/7 (20 overs)	v	Rangpur Riders; 94/7 (20 overs)
Shakib Al Hasan 47* (33); Rubel Hossain 2/32 (4 overs)		Ravi Bopara 28* (30); Shakib Al Hasan 2/13 (4 overs)

Dhaka won by 43 runs
Sher-e-Bangla National Cricket Stadium, Dhaka
Umpires: Nadir Shah (Ban) and Riazuddin (Pak)
Player of the match: Shakib Al Hasan (Dhaka Dynamites)

- Dhaka Dynamites won the toss and elected to bat.
- Ebadot Hossain (Rangpur Riders) made his T20 debut.

6 December 2017
6:00 pm (D/N)
Scorecard

Comilla Victorians; 170/4 (20 overs)	v	Sylhet Sixers; 145/7 (20 overs)
Liton Das 65 (43); Nasir Hossain 1/20 (2 overs)		Sabbir Rahman 31 (20); Graeme Cremer 3/15 (4 overs)

Comilla won by 25 runs
Sher-e-Bangla National Cricket Stadium, Dhaka
Umpires: Akteruzzaman (Ban) and Moniruzzaman (Ban)
Player of the match: Liton Das (Comilla Victorians)

- Sylhet Sixers won the toss and elected to field.

== Play-offs ==
Semifinals
8 December 2017 — Sher-e-Bangla National Cricket Stadium, Dhaka
1	Comilla Victorians	96 (18 overs)
2	Dhaka Dynamites	191/7 (20 overs)
8 December 2017 — Sher-e-Bangla National Cricket Stadium, Dhaka
3	Khulna Titans	167/6 (20 overs)
4	Rangpur Riders	171/2 (15.2 overs)

Preliminary final
10–11 December 2017 — Sher-e-Bangla National Cricket Stadium, Dhaka
1	Comilla Victorians	156 (20 overs)
4	Rangpur Riders	192/3 (20 overs)

Final
12 December 2017 — Sher-e-Bangla National Cricket Stadium, Dhaka
2	Dhaka Dynamites	149/9 (20 overs)
4	Rangpur Riders	206/1 (20 overs)

=== Preliminary ===
==== Eliminator ====
8 December 2017
2:00 pm
Scorecard

Khulna Titans; 167/6 (20 overs)	v	Rangpur Riders; 171/2 (15.2 overs)
Ariful Haque 29 (30); Lasith Malinga 2/49 (4 overs)		Chris Gayle 126* (51); Jofra Archer 2/30 (4 overs)

Rangpur won by 8 wickets
Sher-e-Bangla National Cricket Stadium, Dhaka
Umpires: Anisur Rahman (Ban) and Masudur Rahman (Ban)
Player of the match: Chris Gayle (Rangpur Riders)

- Rangpur Riders won the toss and elected to field.
- As a result of this match, Rangpur Riders advanced to Qualifier 2 and Khulna Titans are eliminated.

==== Qualifier 1 ====
8 December 2017
7:00 pm (D/N)
Scorecard

Dhaka Dynamites; 191/7 (20 overs)	v	Comilla Victorians; 96 (18 overs)
Evin Lewis 47 (32); Hasan Ali 3/16 (4 overs)		Tamim Iqbal 31 (28); Shahid Afridi 3/16 (4 overs)

Dhaka won by 95 runs
Sher-e-Bangla National Cricket Stadium, Dhaka
Umpires: Mahfuzur Rahman (Ban) and Masudur Rahman (Ban)
Player of the match: Shahid Afridi (Dhaka Dynamites)

- Dhaka Dynamites won the toss and elected to bat.
- As a result of this match, Dhaka Dynamites advanced to the Final and Comilla Victorians qualified for Qualifier 2.

==== Qualifier 2 ====
10–11 December 2017
6:00 pm (D/N)
Scorecard

Rangpur Riders; 192/3 (20 overs)	v	Comilla Victorians; 156 (20 overs)
Johnson Charles 105* (63); Hasan Ali 1/23 (4 overs)		Liton Das 39 (28); Rubel Hossain 3/34 (4 overs)

Rangpur won by 36 runs
Sher-e-Bangla National Cricket Stadium, Dhaka
Umpires: Gazi Sohel (Ban) and Raveendra Wimalasiri (SL)
Player of the match: Johnson Charles (Rangpur Riders)

- Comilla Victorians won the toss and elected to field.
- Rain stop play when 7 overs of the 1st innings were completed which caused match to reschedule and begin from 11 December at 6:00 PM from where it was halted
- As a result of this match, Rangpur Riders advanced to the Final and Comilla Victorians are eliminated.
- Johnson Charles (Rangpur Riders) scored his maiden T20 century.

=== Final ===
12 December 2017
6:00 pm (D/N)
Scorecard

Rangpur Riders; 206/1 (20 overs)	v	Dhaka Dynamites; 149/9 (20 overs)
Chris Gayle 146* (69); Shakib Al Hasan 1/26 (3 overs)		Jahurul Islam 50 (38); Nazmul Islam 2/8 (2 overs)

Rangpur won by 57 runs
Sher-e-Bangla National Cricket Stadium, Attendance-24500 Dhaka
Umpires: Mahfuzur Rahman (Ban) and Riazuddin (Pak)
Player of the match: Chris Gayle (Rangpur Riders)

- Dhaka Dynamites won the toss and elected to field.
- Chris Gayle (Rangpur Riders) has hit the most sixes by a player in a T20 match (18 sixes).
- He has also scored the highest score by a player in a T20 final as well as the highest in BPL history.
- The partnership between Gayle and Brendon McCullum is the highest ever in BPL (201* for the 2nd wicket).
- As a result of this match, Rangpur Riders won the championship.

== Statistics ==
Most runs
Player	Team	Matches	Runs
Chris Gayle	Rangpur Riders	11	485
Evin Lewis	Dhaka Dynamites	12	396
Ravi Bopara	Rangpur Riders	15	365
Tamim Iqbal	Comilla Victorians	10	332
Mohammad Mithun	Rangpur Riders	15	329

- Source: Cricinfo.com

Most wickets
Player	Team	Matches	Wickets
Shakib Al Hasan	Dhaka Dynamites	13	22
Abu Jayed	Khulna Titans	12	18
Hasan Ali	Comilla Victorians	9	16
Mohammad Saifuddin	Comilla Victorians	13	16
Shahid Afridi	Dhaka Dynamites	8	15

- Source: Cricinfo.com

=== Highest team totals ===
Team	Total	Opponent	Ground
Khulna Titans	213/5	Rajshahi Kings	Zohur Ahmed Chowdhury Stadium
Chittagong Vikings	211/5	Sylhet Sixers	Zohur Ahmed Chowdhury Stadium
Rangpur Riders	206/1	Dhaka Dynamites	Sher-e-Bangla National Cricket Stadium

- Source: Cricinfo.com
