= List of Bangladesh Twenty20 International cricket records =

Twenty20 International (I20I) cricket records from Bangladesh

A Twenty20 International (T20I) is a form of cricket, played between two of the international members of the International Cricket Council (ICC), in which each team faces a maximum of twenty overs. The matches have top-class status and are the highest T20 standard. The game is played under the rules of Twenty20 cricket. The first Twenty20 International match between two men's sides was played on 17 February 2005, involving Australia and New Zealand. Wisden Cricketers' Almanack reported that "neither side took the game especially seriously", and it was noted by Cricinfo that but for a large score for Ricky Ponting, "the concept would have shuddered". However, Ponting himself said "if it does become an international game then I'm sure the novelty won't be there all the time". This is a list of Bangladesh Cricket team's Twenty20 International records. It is based on the List of Twenty20 International records, but concentrates solely on records dealing with the Bangladeshi cricket team. Bangladesh played the first ever T20I in 2006.

== Key ==
The top five records are listed for each category, except for the team wins, losses, draws and ties, all round records and the partnership records. Tied records for fifth place are also included. Explanations of the general symbols and cricketing terms used in the list are given below. Specific details are provided in each category where appropriate. All records include matches played for Bangladesh only, and are correct as of August 2020.

Key
Symbol	Meaning
†	Player or umpire is currently active in T20I cricket
‡	Event took place during a ICC Men's T20 World Cup
*	Player remained not out or partnership remained unbroken
♠	Twenty20 International cricket record
Date	Starting date of the match
Innings	Number of innings player
Matches	Number of matches played
Opposition	The team Bangladesh was playing against
Period	The time period when the player was active in ODI cricket
Player	The player involved in the record
Venue	Twenty20 International cricket ground where the match was played

== Team records ==
=== Overall Record ===
Matches	Won	Lost	Tied	No Result	Win %
214	87	122	0	5	41.62
Last Updated: 9th June 2026

=== Team wins, losses, draws and ties ===
Bangladesh has played 216 T20I matches resulting in 87 victories, 122 defeats, 0 ties, and 7 no results for an overall winning percentage of 40.28%

Opponent	Span	Matches	Won	Lost	Tied	NR	% Won
Full Members
Afghanistan	2014-2025	16	9	7	0	0	56.25
Australia	2007-2024	11	4	7	0	0	36.36
England	2021-2023	4	3	1	0	0	75.00
India	2009-2025	18	1	17	0	0	5.88
Ireland	2009-2025	11	7	3	0	1	70.00
New Zealand	2010-2026	22	5	16	0	1	23.80
Pakistan	2007-2025	26	5	21	0	0	19.23
South Africa	2007-2024	9	0	9	0	0	0.00
Sri Lanka	2007-2025	22	9	13	0	0	40.90
West Indies	2007-2025	22	8	12	0	2	40.00
Zimbabwe	2006-2024	25	17	8	0	0	68.00
Associate Members
Hong Kong	2014-2025	2	1	1	0	0	50.00
Kenya	2007	1	1	0	0	0	100.00
Malaysia	2023	1	1	0	0	0	100.00
Nepal	2014-2024	2	2	0	0	0	100.00
Netherlands	2012-2025	8	6	1	0	1	80.00
Oman	2016-2021	2	2	0	0	0	100.00
Papua New Guinea	2021-2021	1	1	0	0	0	100.00
Scotland	2012-2021	2	0	2	0	0	0.00
United Arab Emirates	2016-2025	6	4	2	0	0	66.66
United States	2024	3	1	2	0	0	33.33
Total	2006–2026	214	87	122	0	5	41.62
Statistics are correct as of 9 June 2026.

=== First bilateral T20I series wins ===
Opponent	Year [Win Margin (No. of Matches)]	
Opponent	Home	Away
Full Members
Afghanistan	2023 [2–0 (2)]	2025 [3–0 (3)]
Australia	2021 [4–1 (5)]	-
England	2023 [3–0 (3)]	YTP
India	YTP	-
Ireland	2023 [2–1 (3)]	2012 [3–0 (3)]
New Zealand	2021 [3–2 (5)]	-
Pakistan	2015 [1–0 (1)]	-
South Africa	-	-
Sri Lanka	-	2025 [2-1 (3)]
West Indies	2011 [1–0 (1)]	2018 [2–1 (3)]
Zimbabwe	2006 [1–0 (1)]	2021 [2–1 (3)]
Associate Members
Netherlands	2025 [2-0 (3)]	-
Scotland	YTP	-
United Arab Emirates	YTP	2022 [2–0 (2)]
United States	YTP	-
Last Updated: 6 October 2025

=== First T20I match wins ===
Opponent	Home		Away / Neutral	
Opponent	Venue	Year	Venue	Year
Full Members
Afghanistan	Mirpur	2014‡	Abu Dhabi	2025
Australia	Mirpur	2021	-	
England	Chittagong	2023	-	
India	-		New Delhi	2019
Ireland	Chittagong	2023	Belfast	2012
New Zealand	Mirpur	2021	Napier	2023
Pakistan	Mirpur	2015	Hangzhou	2023
South Africa	-			
Sri Lanka	Mirpur	2016	Colombo	2017
West Indies	Mirpur	2011	Johannesburg	2007‡
Zimbabwe	Khulna	2006	Bulawayo	2013
Associate Members
Hong Kong	-		Abu Dhabi	2025
Kenya	YTP		Nairobi	2007
Malaysia	YTP		Hangzhou	2023
Nepal	Chittagong	2014‡	Kingstown	2024‡
Netherlands	Sylhet	2025	The Hague	2012
Oman	YTP		Dharamshala	2016‡
Papua New Guinea	YTP		Muscat	2021‡
Scotland	YTP		-	
United Arab Emirates	Mirpur	2016	Dubai	2022
United States	YTP		Houston	2024
Last Updated: 17 September 2025

=== Team scoring records ===
==== Most runs in an innings ====
The highest innings total scored in T20Is has been scored twice. The first occasion came in the match between Afghanistan and Ireland when Afghanistan scored 278/3 in the 2nd T20I of the Ireland series in India in February 2019. The Czech Republic against Turkey during the 2019 Continental Cup scored 278/4 to equal the record. The highest score for Bangladesh is 215/5 scored against Sri Lanka during the 2018 Nidahas Trophy.

Rank	Score	Opposition	Venue	Date
1	215/5	Sri Lanka	Ranasinghe Premadasa Stadium, Colombo, Sri Lanka	10 March 2018
2	211/4	West Indies	Sher-e-Bangla National Cricket Stadium, Mirpur, Bangladesh	20 December 2018
3	207/5	Ireland	Zohur Ahmed Chowdhury Stadium, Chittagong, Bangladesh	27 March 2023
4	205/5	United Arab Emirates	Sharjah Cricket Stadium, Sharjah, United Arab Emirates	19 May 2025
5	203/8	Sri Lanka	Sylhet International Cricket Stadium, Sylhet, Bangladesh	4 March 2024
Last Updated: 13 September 2025

==== Fewest runs in an innings ====
The lowest innings total scored was by Turkey against Czech Republic when they were dismissed for 21 during the 2019 Continental Cup. The lowest score in T20I history for Bangladesh is 70 scored against New Zealand in the 2016 ICC World Twenty20.

Rank	Score	Opposition	Venue	Date
1	70/10	New Zealand	Eden Gardens, Kolkata, India	26 March 2016 ‡
2	73/10	Australia	Dubai International Cricket Stadium, Dubai, UAE	4 November 2021 ‡
3	76/10	New Zealand	Sher-e-Bangla National Cricket Stadium, Mirpur, Bangladesh	5 September 2021
3	76/10	New Zealand	Eden Park, Auckland, New Zealand	1 April 2021
5	78/10	New Zealand	Seddon Park, Hamilton, New Zealand	3 February 2010
Last Updated: 4 November 2021

==== Most runs conceded an innings ====
The third match of the Bangladesh's tour of India in October 2024 saw Bangladesh concede their highest innings total of 297/6.

Rank	Score	Opposition	Venue	Date
1	297/6	India	Rajiv Gandhi International Cricket Stadium, Hyderabad, India	12 October 2024
2	224/4	South Africa	North West Cricket Stadium, Potchefstroom, South Africa	29 October 2017
3	221/9	India	Arun Jaitley Stadium, New Delhi, India	9 October 2024
4	214/6	Sri Lanka	Ranasinghe Premadasa Stadium, Colombo, Sri Lanka	10 March 2018
5	210/4	Sri Lanka	Sylhet International Cricket Stadium, Sylhet, Bangladesh	18 February 2018
Last Updated: 12 October 2024

==== Fewest runs conceded in an innings ====
The lowest score conceded by Bangladesh for a full inning is 60 when they dismissed New Zealand in the first T20I of the 2021 T20I Series at the Sher-e-Bangla National Cricket Stadium, Mirpur, Bangladesh.

Rank	Score	Opposition	Venue	Date
1	60	New Zealand	Sher-e-Bangla National Cricket Stadium, Mirpur, Bangladesh	1 September 2021
2	62	Australia	Sher-e-Bangla National Cricket Stadium, Mirpur, Bangladesh	9 August 2021
3	72	Afghanistan	Sher-e-Bangla National Cricket Stadium, Mirpur, Bangladesh	16 March 2014 ‡
4	82	United Arab Emirates	Sher-e-Bangla National Cricket Stadium, Mirpur, Bangladesh	26 February 2016
5	85	Nepal	Arnos Vale Stadium, Kingstown, Saint Vincent and Grenadines	16 June 2024
Last Updated: 8 September 2021

==== Most runs aggregate in a match ====
The highest match aggregate scored in T20Is came in the match between India and West Indies in the first T20I of the August 2016 series at Central Broward Regional Park, Lauderhill when India scored 244/4 in response to West Indies score of 245/6 to lose the match by 1 run. The third match of the Bangladesh's tour of India in October 2024 saw a total of 461 runs being scored, the most involving Bangladesh.

Rank	Aggregate	Scores	Venue	Date
1	464/13	India (297/6) v Bangladesh (167/7)	Rajiv Gandhi International Cricket Stadium, Hyderabad, India	12 October 2024
2	429/11	Sri Lanka (214/6) v Bangladesh (215/5)	Ranasinghe Premadasa Stadium, Colombo, Sri Lanka	10 March 2018
3	409/11	Sri Lanka (206/3) v Bangladesh (203/8)	Sylhet International Cricket Stadium, Sylhet, Bangladesh	4 March 2024
5	393/10	Zimbabwe (205/3) v Bangladesh (188/6)	Harare Sports Club, Harare, Zimbabwe	30 July 2022
5	393/14	New Zealand (204/5) v Bangladesh (189/9)	Sher-e-Bangla National Cricket Stadium, Mirpur, Bangladesh	6 November 2013
Last Updated: 12 October 2024

==== Fewest runs aggregate in a match ====
The lowest match aggregate in T20Is is 57 when Turkey were dismissed for 28 by Luxembourg in the second T20I of the 2019 Continental Cup in Romania in August 2019. The lowest match aggregate in T20I history for Bangladesh is 150 scored during the 2014 ICC World Twenty20 game against Afghanistan at the Sher-e-Bangla National Cricket Stadium, Mirpur, Bangladesh.

Rank	Aggregate	Scores	Venue	Date
1	113/5	Pakistan (48/1) v Bangladesh (65/4)	Zhejiang University of Technology Cricket Field, Hangzhou, China	7 October 2023
2	122/13	New Zealand (60) v Bangladesh (62/3)	Sher-e-Bangla National Cricket Stadium, Mirpur, Bangladesh	1 September 2021
3	150/11	Afghanistan (72) v Bangladesh (78/1)	Sher-e-Bangla National Cricket Stadium, Mirpur, Bangladesh	16 March 2014 ‡
4	151/12	Bangladesh (73) v Australia (78/2)	Dubai International Cricket Stadium, Dubai, UAE	4 November 2021‡
5	157/10	Bangladesh (78) v New Zealand (79/0)	Seddon Park, Hamilton, New Zealand	3 February 2010
Last Updated: 7 October 2023

=== Result records ===
A T20I match is won when one side has scored more runs than the runs scored by the opposing side during their innings. If both sides have completed both their allocated innings and the side that fielded last has the higher aggregate of runs, it is known as a win by runs. This indicates the number of runs that they had scored more than the opposing side. If the side batting last wins the match, it is known as a win by wickets, indicating the number of wickets that were still to fall.

==== Greatest win margins (by runs) ====
The greatest winning margin by runs in T20Is was Czech Republic's victory over Turkey by 257 runs in the sixth match of the 2019 Continental Cup. The largest victory recorded by Bangladesh was during the Bangladesh's tour of Ireland Lanka in 2012 by 71 runs.

Rank	Margin	Opposition	Venue	Date
1	84 Runs	Papua New Guinea	Oman Cricket Academy Ground, Muscat, Oman	21 October 2021 ‡
2	77 Runs	Ireland	Zohur Ahmed Chowdhury Stadium, Chittagong	29 March 2023
3	71 Runs	Ireland	Civil Service Cricket Club Ground, Belfast, Northern Ireland	18 July 2012
4	61 Runs	Afghanistan	Sher-e-Bangla National Stadium, Dhaka, Bangladesh	3 March 2022
5	60 Runs	Australia	Sher-e-Bangla National Stadium, Dhaka, Bangladesh	9 August 2021
Last Updated: 29 March 2023

==== Greatest win margins (by balls remaining) ====
The greatest winning margin by balls remaining in T20Is was Austria's victory over Turkey by 104 balls remaining in the ninth match of the 2019 Continental Cup. The largest victory recorded by Bangladesh is during the 2014 ICC World Twenty20 against Afghanistan when they won by 9 wickets with 48 balls remaining.

Rank	Balls remaining	Margin	Opposition	Venue	Date
1	48	9 wickets	Afghanistan	Sher-e-Bangla National Cricket Stadium, Mirpur, Bangladesh	16 March 2014 ‡
2	30	7 wickets	New Zealand	Sher-e-Bangla National Cricket Stadium, Mirpur, Bangladesh	1 September 2021
3	27	8 wickets	Nepal	Zohur Ahmed Chowdhury Stadium, Chittagong, Bangladesh	18 March 2014 ‡
4	25	9 wickets	Zimbabwe	Sher-e-Bangla National Cricket Stadium, Mirpur, Bangladesh	11 March 2020
5	22	7 wickets	Pakistan	Sher-e-Bangla National Cricket Stadium, Mirpur, Bangladesh	24 April 2015
Last Updated: 1 September 2021

==== Greatest win margins (by wickets) ====
A total of 22 matches have ended with chasing team winning by 10 wickets with New Zealand winning by such margins a record three times. Bangladesh have not won a T20I match by this margin yet.

Rank	Margin	Opposition	Venue	Date
1	9 wickets	Afghanistan	Sher-e-Bangla National Cricket Stadium, Mirpur, Bangladesh	16 March 2014 ‡
1	9 wickets	Zimbabwe	Sher-e-Bangla National Cricket Stadium, Mirpur, Bangladesh	11 March 2020
3	8 wickets	Netherlands	Sportpark Westvliet, The Hague, Netherlands	25 July 2012
3	8 wickets	Nepal	Zohur Ahmed Chowdhury Stadium, Chittagong, Bangladesh	18 March 2014 ‡
3	8 wickets	Zimbabwe	Harare Sports Club, Harare, Zimbabwe	22 July 2021
3	8 wickets	Sri Lanka	Sylhet International Cricket Stadium, Sylhet, Bangladesh	6 March 2024
Last updated: 1 September 2021

==== Highest successful run chases ====
Australia holds the record for the highest successful run chase which they achieved when they scored 245/5 in response to New Zealand's 243/6. Bangladesh's highest innings total while chasing is 215/5 in a successful run chase against Sri Lanka at Colombo (RPS), Sri Lanka during the 2018 Nidahas Trophy.

Rank	Score	Target	Opposition	Venue	Date
1	215/5	215	Sri Lanka	Ranasinghe Premadasa Stadium, Colombo, Sri Lanka	10 March 2018
2	194/5	194	Zimbabwe	Harare Sports Club, Harare, Zimbabwe	25 July 2021
3	170/2	166	Sri Lanka	Sylhet International Cricket Stadium, Sylhet, Bangladesh	6 March 2024
4	166/6	164	Zimbabwe	Sheikh Abu Naser Stadium, Khulna, Bangladesh	15 January 2016
5	165/4	165	West Indies	New Wanderers Stadium, Johannesburg, South Africa	13 September 2007 ‡
Last Updated: 25 July 2021

==== Narrowest win margins (by runs) ====
The narrowest run margin victory is by 1 run which has been achieved in 15 T20I's with Bangladesh winning such games once.

Rank	Margin	Opposition	Venue	Date
1	1 Run	Ireland	Civil Service Cricket Club Ground, Belfast, Northern Ireland	20 July 2012
2	2 Runs	Malaysia	Zhejiang University of Technology Cricket Field, Hangzhou, China	4 October 2023
3	3 Runs	Zimbabwe	Brisbane Cricket Ground, Brisbane, Australia	30 October 2022 ‡
4	4 Runs	New Zealand	Sher-e-Bangla National Cricket Stadium, Mirpur, Bangladesh	3 September 2021
5	7 Runs	United Arab Emirates	Dubai International Cricket Stadium, Dubai, UAE	25 September 2022
Last Updated: 4 October 2023

==== Narrowest win margins (by balls remaining) ====
The narrowest winning margin by balls remaining in T20Is is by winning of the last ball which has been achieved 26 times. Bangladesh has achieve victory of the last ball once.

Rank	Balls remaining	Margin	Opposition	Venue	Date
1	0	2 wickets	Ireland	Civil Service Cricket Club Ground, Belfast, Northern Ireland	21 July 2012
2	1	3 wickets	West Indies	Sher-e-Bangla National Cricket Stadium, Mirpur, Bangladesh	11 October 2011
2	1	2 wickets	Sri Lanka	Ranasinghe Premadasa Stadium, Colombo, Sri Lanka	16 March 2018
4	2	5 wickets	Sri Lanka	Ranasinghe Premadasa Stadium, Colombo, Sri Lanka	10 March 2018
4	2	3 wickets	Zimbabwe	Sher-e-Bangla National Cricket Stadium, Mirpur, Bangladesh	13 September 2019
Last Updated: 28 March 2021

==== Narrowest win margins (by wickets) ====
The narrowest margin of victory by wickets is 1 wicket which has settled four such T20Is. The narrowest victory by wickets for Bangladesh is two wickets achieved on two occasions.

Rank	Margin	Opposition	Venue	Date
1	2 wickets	Ireland	Civil Service Cricket Club Ground, Belfast, Northern Ireland	21 July 2012 ‡
1	2 wickets	Sri Lanka	Ranasinghe Premadasa Stadium, Colombo, Sri Lanka	16 March 2018
1	2 wickets	Sri Lanka	Grand Prairie Stadium, Dallas, United States	8 June 2024
4	3 wickets	West Indies	Sher-e-Bangla National Cricket Stadium, Mirpur, Bangladesh	11 October 2011 ‡
4	3 wickets	Zimbabwe	Sher-e-Bangla National Cricket Stadium, Mirpur, Bangladesh	13 September 2019
4	3 wickets	Afghanistan	Zohur Ahmed Chowdhury Stadium, Chittagong, Bangladesh	21 September 2019
Last Updated: 28 March 2021

==== Greatest loss margins (by runs) ====
Bangladesh's biggest defeat by runs was against Pakistan in the 2024 tour of India at the Rajiv Gandhi International Cricket Stadium, Hyderabad, India.

Rank	Margin	Opposition	Venue	Date
1	133 runs	India	Rajiv Gandhi International Cricket Stadium, Hyderabad, India	12 October 2024
2	104 runs	South Africa	Sydney Cricket Ground, Sydney, Australia	27 October 2022 ‡
3	102 runs	Pakistan	National Stadium, Karachi, Pakistan	20 April 2008
4	86 runs	India	Arun Jaitley Stadium, New Delhi, India	9 October 2024
5	83 runs	South Africa	North West Cricket Stadium, Potchefstroom, South Africa	29 October 2017
Last Updated: 12 October 2024

==== Greatest loss margins (by balls remaining) ====
The largest defeat suffered by Bangladesh was against New Zealand in New Zealand during the 2010 T20I Series when they lost by 10 wickets with 70 balls remaining.

Rank	Balls remaining	Margin	Opposition	Venue	Date
1	82	8 wickets	Australia	Dubai International Cricket Stadium, Dubai, UAE	4 November 2021 ‡
2	70	10 wickets	New Zealand	Seddon Park, Hamilton, New Zealand	3 February 2010
3	55	8 wickets	West Indies	Sylhet International Cricket Stadium, Sylhet, Bangladesh	17 December 2018
4	39	6 wickets	South Africa	Sheikh Zayed Cricket Stadium, Abu Dhabi, UAE	2 November 2021 ‡
5	37	9 wickets	Australia	Sahara Park Newlands, Cape Town, South Africa	16 September 2007 ‡
Last Updated: 29 October 2021

==== Greatest loss margins (by wickets) ====
Bangladesh have lost a T20I match by a margin of 10 wickets on one occasion.

Rank	Margins	Opposition	Most recent venue	Date
1	10 wickets	New Zealand	Seddon Park, Hamilton, New Zealand	3 February 2010
2	9 wickets	Australia	Sahara Park Newlands, Cape Town, South Africa	16 September 2007 ‡
2	9 wickets	Pakistan	Gaddafi Stadium, Lahore, Pakistan	25 January 2020
4	8 wickets	Pakistan	Pallekele International Cricket Stadium, Kandy, Sri Lanka	25 September 2012 ‡
4	8 wickets	India	Sher-e-Bangla National Cricket Stadium, Mirpur, Bangladesh	28 March 2014 ‡
4	8 wickets	India	Sher-e-Bangla National Cricket Stadium, Mirpur, Bangladesh	6 March 2016
4	8 wickets	West Indies	Sylhet International Cricket Stadium, Sylhet, Bangladesh	17 December 2018
4	8 wickets	India	Saurashtra Cricket Association Stadium, Rajkot, India	7 November 2019
4	8 wickets	England	Sheikh Zayed Cricket Stadium, Abu Dhabi, UAE	27 October 2021 ‡
4	8 wickets	Australia	Sheikh Zayed Cricket Stadium, Abu Dhabi, UAE	4 November 2021 ‡
4	8 wickets	Pakistan	Sher-e-Bangla National Cricket Stadium, Mirpur, Bangladesh	20 November 2021
Last Updated: 24 November 2021

==== Narrowest loss margins (by runs) ====
The narrowest loss of Bangladesh in terms of runs is by 1 run suffered twice.

Rank	Margin	Opposition	Venue	Date
1	1 run	India	M. Chinnaswamy Stadium, Bangalore, India	23 March 2016 ‡
1	1 run	Afghanistan	Rajiv Gandhi International Cricket Stadium, Dehradun, India	7 June 2018
3	2 runs	Sri Lanka	Zohur Ahmed Chowdhury Stadium, Chittagong, Bangladesh	12 February 2014
4	3 runs	West Indies	Sharjah Cricket Stadium, Sharjah, UAE	27 October 2021 ‡
5	4 runs	South Africa	Nassau County International Cricket Stadium, New York, United States	10 June 2024 ‡
Last Updated: 13 June 2024

==== Narrowest loss margins (by balls remaining) ====
Bangladesh has suffered loss off the last ball thrice.

Rank	Balls remaining	Margin	Opposition	Venue	Date
1	0	1 wickets	Netherlands	Sportpark Westvliet, The Hague, Netherlands	26 July 2012
1	0	3 wickets	Sri Lanka	Zohur Ahmed Chowdhury Stadium, Chittagong, Bangladesh	14 February 2014
1	0	4 wickets	India	Ranasinghe Premadasa Stadium, Colombo, Sri Lanka	18 March 2018
1	0	5 wickets	Pakistan	Sher-e-Bangla National Cricket Stadium, Mirpur, Bangladesh	22 November 2021
5	1	3 wickets	Zimbabwe	Sher-e-Bangla National Cricket Stadium, Mirpur, Bangladesh	15 November 2015
Last Updated: 24 November 2021

==== Narrowest loss margins (by wickets) ====
Bangladesh has suffered defeat by 1 wicket once.

Rank	Margin	Opposition	Venue	Date
1	1 wicket	Netherlands	Sportpark Westvliet, The Hague, Netherlands	26 July 2012
2	2 wickets	Hong Kong	Zohur Ahmed Chowdhury Stadium, Chittagong, Bangladesh	20 March 2014 ‡
3	3 wickets	Sri Lanka	Zohur Ahmed Chowdhury Stadium, Chittagong, Bangladesh	14 February 2014
3	3 wickets	Zimbabwe	Sher-e-Bangla National Cricket Stadium, Mirpur, Bangladesh	15 November 2015
3	3 wickets	Australia	M. Chinnaswamy Stadium, Bangalore, India	21 March 2016 ‡
3	3 wickets	Australia	Sher-e-Bangla National Cricket Stadium, Mirpur, Bangladesh	7 August 2021
Last Updated: 7 August 2021

== Batting records ==
=== Most career runs ===
A run is the basic means of scoring in cricket. A run is scored when the batsman hits the ball with his bat and with his partner runs the length of 22 yards (20 m) of the pitch. Shakib Al Hasan is the leading Bangladeshi batsmen on this list.

Rank	Runs	Player	Matches	Innings	Period
1	2,556	Litton Das †	114	112	2015-2025
2	2,551	Shakib Al Hasan	129	127	2006-2024
3	2,444	Mahmudullah	141	130	2007-2024
4	1,701	Tamim Iqbal	74	74	2007-2020
5	1,500	Mushfiqur Rahim	102	93	2006-2022
Last Updated: 22 September 2025

=== Most runs in each batting position ===
Batting position	Batsman	Innings	Runs	Average	Career Span	Ref
Opener	Tamim Iqbal	74	1,701	24.65	2007–2020	
Number 3	Shakib Al Hasan	42	1,085	29.32	2012–2023	
Number 4	Mushfiqur Rahim	49	988	22.97	2012–2022	
Number 5	Mahmudullah	51	901	20.02	2009–2024	
Number 6	Mahmudullah	49	999 ♠	28.54	2007–2024	
Number 7	Mahmudullah	18	261	18.64	2007–2024	
Number 8	Mashrafe Mortaza	21	224	14.00	2006–2017	
Number 9	Taskin Ahmed †	20	132	12.00	2014–2024	
Number 10	Hasan Mahmud †	7	45	45.00	2022–2025	
Number 11	Mustafizur Rahman †	18	63	6.30	2015–2025	
Last Updated: 22 September 2025.

=== Most runs against each team ===
Opposition	Runs	Player	Matches	Innings	Span	Ref
Afghanistan	236	Litton Das †	11	11	2018–2025	
Australia	265	Shakib Al Hasan	10	10	2007–2024	
England	144	Najmul Hossain Shanto †	3	3	2021–2021	
Hong Kong	59	Litton Das †	1	1	2025–2025	
India	248	Mahmudullah	15	15	2009–2024	
Ireland	142	Shakib Al Hasan	8	8	2009–2023	
Kenya	43	Nazimuddin	1	1	2007–2007	
Nepal	54	Shakib Al Hasan	2	2	2014–2024	
Netherlands	202	Tamim Iqbal	3	3	2012–2016	
New Zealand	306	Mahmudullah	14	14	2010–2021	
Oman	103	Tamim Iqbal	1	1	2016–2016	
Pakistan	360	Shakib Al Hasan	11	11	2007–2022	
Papua New Guinea	50	Mahmudullah	1	1	2021–2021	
Scotland	51	Shakib Al Hasan	2	2	2012–2021	
South Africa	150	Soumya Sarkar †	6	6	2015–2022	
Sri Lanka	368	Mahmudullah	16	15	2007–2024	
United Arab Emirates	109	Tanzid Hasan †	3	3	2025–2025	
West Indies	347	Shakib Al Hasan	14	14	2007–2022	
Zimbabwe	360	Mahmudullah	20	18	2013–2024	
Last updated: 22 September 2025

=== Highest individual score ===
Tamim Iqbal holds the Bangladeshi record with his century against Oman during the 2016 ICC World Twenty20.

Rank	Runs	Player	Opposition	Venue	Date
1	103*	Tamim Iqbal	Oman	Himachal Pradesh Cricket Association Stadium, Dharamshala, India	13 March 2016 ‡
2	100	Parvez Hossain Emon †	United Arab Emirates	Sharjah Cricket Stadium, Sharjah, United Arab Emirates	17 May 2025
5	89	Tanzid Hasan †	West Indies	Bir Shrestho Flight Lieutenant Matiur Rahman Cricket Stadium, Chittagong, Bangladesh	31 October 2025
3	88*	Tamim Iqbal	West Indies	Sher-e-Bangla National Cricket Stadium, Mirpur, Bangladesh	10 December 2012
4	84	Shakib Al Hasan	Pakistan	Pallekele International Cricket Stadium, Kandy, Sri Lanka	25 September 2012 ‡
Last Updated: 27 March 2026

=== Highest individual score – progression of record ===
Runs	Player	Opponent	Venue	Season
36	Mashrafe Mortaza	Zimbabwe	Sheikh Abu Naser Stadium, Khulna, Bangladesh	28 November 2006
43	Nazimuddin (cricketer)	Kenya	Gymkhana Club Ground, Nairobi, Kenya	1 September 2007
81	Nazimuddin (cricketer)	Pakistan	Gymkhana Club Ground, Nairobi, Kenya	2 September 2007
84	Shakib Al Hasan	Pakistan	Pallekele International Cricket Stadium, Kandy, Sri Lanka	25 September 2012 ‡
88*	Tamim Iqbal	West Indies	Sher-e-Bangla National Cricket Stadium, Mirpur, Bangladesh	10 December 2012
103*	Tamim Iqbal	Oman	Himachal Pradesh Cricket Association Stadium, Dharamshala, India	13 March 2016 ‡
Last Updated: 28 March 2021

=== Highest score against each opponent ===
Opposition	Player	Score	Date
Afghanistan	Shakib Al Hasan	70*	21 September 2019
Australia	Shakib Al Hasan	66	1 April 2014
England	Litton Das †	73	14 March 2023
Hong Kong	Shakib Al Hasan	34	20 March 2014
India	Mohammad Naim	81	10 November 2019
Ireland	Rony Talukdar	68	27 March 2023
Kenya	Nazimuddin	43	1 September 2007
Nepal	Anamul Haque	42	18 March 2014
Netherlands	Tamim Iqbal	83*	9 March 2016
New Zealand	Shakib Al Hasan	70	12 October 2022
Oman	Tamim Iqbal	103*	13 March 2016
Pakistan	Shakib Al Hasan	84	25 September 2012
Papua New Guinea	Mahmudullah	50	21 October 2021
Scotland	Mushfiqur Rahim	38	24 July 2012
South Africa	Soumya Sarkar	47	26 October 2017
Sri Lanka	Sabbir Rahman	80	28 February 2016
United Arab Emirates	Parvez Hossain Emon †	100	17 May 2025
West Indies	Tamim Iqbal	88*	10 December 2012
Zimbabwe	Soumya Sarkar	68	25 July 2021
Last Updated: 12 October 2022

=== Highest career average ===
A batsman's batting average is the total number of runs they have scored divided by the number of times they have been dismissed.

Rank	Average	Player	Innings	Not out	Runs	Period
1	28.00	Tanzid Hasan †	45	5	1,120	2024-2025
2	27.37	Towhid Hridoy †	51	8	952	2023-2025
3	26.05	Saif Hassan †	20	3	443	2021-2025
4	25.06	Jaker Ali †	43	13	752	2023-2025
5	24.72	Anamul Haque †	20	2	445	2012-2022
Qualification: 20 innings. Last Updated: 3 December 2025

=== Highest Average in each batting position ===
Batting position	Batsman	Innings	Runs	Average	Career Span	Ref
Opener	Tanzid Hasan †	31	741	27.44	2024–2025	
Number 3	Sabbir Rahman	27	724	31.47	2014–2018	
Number 4	Afif Hossain †	11	303	33.66	2018–2022	
Number 5	Jakir Ali †	13	322	40.25	2023–2025	
Number 6	Mahmudullah	49	999	28.54	2007–2024	
Number 7	Mosaddek Hossain	14	190	21.11	2017–2022	
Number 8	Mashrafe Mortaza	21	224	14.00	2006–2017	
Number 9	Nasum Ahmed †	10	69	13.80	2021–2025	
Number 10	Shoriful Islam †	12	23	3.28	2021–2025	
Number 11	Mustafizur Rahman †	19	63	6.30	2015–2024	
Qualification: Minimum 10 innings; Last Updated: 13 September 2025.

=== Most half-centuries ===
A half-century is a score of between 50 and 99 runs. Statistically, once a batsman's score reaches 100, it is no longer considered a half-century but a century.

Rank	Half centuries	Player	Innings	Runs	Period
1	15	Litton Das †	110	2,524	2015-2025
2	13	Shakib Al Hasan	127	2,551	2006-2023
3	8	Mahmudullah	127	2,394	2007-2024
4	7	Tamim Iqbal	74	1,701	2007-2020
5	6	Mushfiqur Rahim	93	1,500	2006-2022
5	6	Tanzid Hasan †	37	856	2024-2025
Last Updated: 13 September 2025

=== Most centuries ===
A century is a score of 100 or more runs in a single innings.

Rank	Centuries	Player	Innings	Period
1	1	Parvez Hossain Emon †	8	2022–2025
1	1	Tamim Iqbal	74	2007–2020
Last Updated: 17 May 2025

=== Most Sixes ===
Rank	Sixes	Player	Innings	Runs	Period
1	81	Litton Das †	118	2,655	2015–2025
2	77	Mahmudullah	130	2,444	2007–2024
3	55	Soumya Sarkar †	86	1,462	2015–2024
4	53	Shakib Al Hasan	127	2,551	2006–2024
5	52	Tanzid Hasan †	45	1,120	2024–2025
Last Updated: 13 September 2025

=== Most Fours ===
Rank	Fours	Player	Innings	Runs	Period
1	258	Shakib Al Hasan	127	2,551	2006-2024
2	245	Litton Das †	110	2,524	2015-2025
3	184	Mahmudullah	130	2,444	2007-2024
4	180	Tamim Iqbal	74	1,701	2007-2020
5	145	Soumya Sarkar †	86	1,462	2015-2024
Last Updated: 13 September 2025

=== Highest strike rates ===
Abhishek Sharma of India holds the record for highest strike rate, with 190.46.

Rank	Strike rate	Player	Runs	Balls Faced	Period
1	136.10	Mashrafe Mortaza	377	277	2006–2017
2	130.25	Parvez Hossain Emon †	607	466	2022–2025
5	128.00	Tanzid Hasan †	1,120	875	2024–2025
4	126.48	Litton Das †	2,655	2,099	2015–2025
3	126.40	Mohammad Ashraful	450	356	2007–2013
Qualification= 250 balls faced. Last Updated: 27 March 2026

=== Highest strike rates in an inning ===
Dwayne Smith of West Indies strike rate of 414.28 during his 29 off 7 balls against Bangladesh during 2007 ICC World Twenty20 is the world record for highest strike rate in an innings. Aftab Ahmed with his innings of 36 off 14 balls against South Africa in September 2018 during the 2007 ICC World Twenty20 holds the top position for a Bangladesh player in this list.

Rank	Strike rate	Player	Runs	Balls Faced	Opposition	Venue	Date
1	257.14	Aftab Ahmed	36	14	South Africa	Sahara Park Newlands, Cape Town, South Africa	15 September 2007 ‡
2	253.85	Mahmudullah †	33*	13	India	Sher-e-Bangla National Cricket Stadium, Mirpur, Bangladesh	6 March 2016
3	238.89	Mahmudullah †	43*	18	Sri Lanka	Ranasinghe Premadasa Stadium, Colombo, Sri Lanka	16 March 2018
4	235.29	Ziaur Rahman	40*	17	Ireland	Civil Service Cricket Club Ground, Belfast, Northern Ireland	18 July 2012
5	247.62	Mashrafe Mortaza	30	13	Ireland	Civil Service Cricket Club Ground, Belfast, Northern Ireland	21 July 2012
Last Updated: 28 March 2021

=== Most runs in a calendar year ===
Paul Stirling of Ireland holds the record for most runs scored in a calendar year with 748 runs scored in 2019. Sabbir Rahman scored 463 runs in 2016, the most for a Bangladesh batsmen in a year.

Rank	Runs	Player	Matches	Innings	Year
1	775	Tanzid Hasan	27	27	2025
2	635	Litton Das	25	25	2025
3	575	Mohammad Naim	26	26	2021
4	544	Litton Das	19	19	2022
5	519	Parvez Hossain Emon	23	23	2025
Last Updated: 3 December 2025

=== Most runs in a series ===
The 2014 ICC World Twenty20 in Bangladesh saw Virat Kohli set the record for the most runs scored in a single series scoring 319 runs. He is followed by Tillakaratne Dilshan with 317 runs scored in the 2009 ICC World Twenty20. Tamim Iqbal has scored the most runs in a series for a Bangladesh batsmen, when he scored 295 runs in the 2016 ICC World Twenty20.

Rank	Runs	Player	Matches	Innings	Series
1	295	Tamim Iqbal †	6	6	2016 ICC World Twenty20
2	199	Mushfiqur Rahim †	5	5	2018 Nidahas Trophy
3	186	Shakib Al Hasan †	7	7	2014 ICC World Twenty20
4	184	Anamul Haque	7	7	2014 ICC World Twenty20
5	180	Najmul Hossain Shanto †	5	5	2022 Men's T20 World Cup
Last Updated: 3 December 2025

=== Most ducks ===
A duck refers to a batsman being dismissed without scoring a run. Tillakaratne Dilshan of Sri Lanka, Pakistan's Umar Akmal and Ireland's Kevin O'Brien has scored the equal highest number of ducks in T20Is with 10 such knocks. Soumy Sarkar with 11 ducks has the highest number of such knocks for Bangladesh.

Rank	Ducks	Player	Matches	Innings	Period
1	13	Soumya Sarkar†	85	85	2015-2024
2	9	Shakib Al Hasan	129	127	2006-2024
3	8	Mushfiqur Rahim	102	93	2006-2022
4	7	Mustafizur Rahman†	106	32	2015-2024
5	6	Mahedi Hasan†	51	35	2018-2024
5	6	Taskin Ahmed†	70	35	2014-2024
5	6	Mashrafe Mortaza	54	39	2006-2017
5	6	Afif Hossain†	69	63	2018-2023
5	6	Tamim Iqbal	74	74	2007-2020
Last Updated: 13 October 2024

== Bowling records ==
=== Most career wickets ===
A bowler takes the wicket of a batsman when the form of dismissal is bowled, caught, leg before wicket, stumped or hit wicket. If the batsman is dismissed by run out, obstructing the field, handling the ball, hitting the ball twice or timed out the bowler does not receive credit.

Tim Southee of New Zealand is the highest wicket-taker in T20Is. Shakib Al Hasan is the highest ranked Bangladeshi bowler on the all-time.

Rank	Wickets	Player	Matches	Innings	Average	Period
1	149	Shakib Al Hasan	129	127	20.91	2006-2024
2	134	Mustafizur Rahman†	107	106	21.42	2015-2025
3	99	Taskin Ahmed†	68	67	23.94	2014-2025
4	46	Shoriful Islam†	41	40	24.23	2021-2024
5	44	Abdur Razzak	34	33	19.04	2006-2014
Last Updated: 24 June 2024

=== Most wickets against each team ===
Opposition	Wickets	Player	Matches	Innings	Span	Ref
Afghanistan	15	Shakib Al Hasan	12	12	2014–2024	
Australia	12	Shakib Al Hasan	10	9	2007–2024	
England	4	Mehidy Hasan Miraz†	2	2	2021–2021	
England	4	Taskin Ahmed†	3	3	2021–2021	
Hong Kong	3	Shakib Al Hasan	1	1	2014–2014	
India	8	Al-Amin Hossain†	7	7	2014–2019	
Ireland	8	Elias Sunny	3	3	2012–2012	
Ireland	8	Taskin Ahmed†	4	3	2016–2023	
Kenya	2	Abdur Razzak	1	1	2007–2007	
Kenya	2	Farhad Reza	1	1	2007–2007	
Kenya	2	Mashrafe Mortaza	1	1	2007–2007	
Nepal	4	Tanzim Hasan Sakib†	1	1	2024–2024	
Netherlands	7	Shakib Al Hasan	5	5	2012–2024	
New Zealand	16	Mustafizur Rahman†	11	11	2016–2023	
Oman	7	Shakib Al Hasan	2	2	2016–2021	
Pakistan	8	Taskin Ahmed†	9	9	2015–2022	
Papua New Guinea	4	Shakib Al Hasan	1	1	2021–2021	
Scotland	3	Mahedi Hasan†	1	1	2021–2021	
Scotland	3	Shakib Al Hasan	2	2	2012–2021	
South Africa	9	Shakib Al Hasan	8	8	2007–2024	
Sri Lanka	17	Mustafizur Rahman†	13	13	2016–2024	
United Arab Emirates	4	Mustafizur Rahman†	2	2	2016–2022	
West Indies	21	Shakib Al Hasan	14	13	2007–2022	
Zimbabwe	27	Mustafizur Rahman†	15	15	2015–2024	
Last updated: 24 June 2024

=== Best figures in an innings ===
Bowling figures refers to the number of the wickets a bowler has taken and the number of runs conceded.

Rank	Figures	Player	Opposition	Venue	Date
1	6/10	Mustafizur Rahman	United States	Prairie View Cricket Complex, Houston, USA	25 May 2024
2	5/13	Elias Sunny	Ireland	Civil Service Cricket Club Ground, Belfast, Northern Ireland	18 July 2012
3	5/20	Shakib Al Hasan	West Indies	Sher-e-Bangla National Cricket Stadium, Mirpur, Bangladesh	20 December 2018
3	5/20	Mosaddek Hossain	Zimbabwe	Harare Sports Club, Harare, Zimbabwe	31 July 2022
5	5/22	Mustafizur Rahman	New Zealand	Eden Gardens, Kolkata, India	26 March 2016 ‡
5	5/22	Shakib Al Hasan	Ireland	Zohur Ahmed Chowdhury Stadium, Chattogram, Bangladesh	29 March 2023
Last Updated: 25 May 2024

=== Best figures in an innings – progression of record ===
Figures	Player	Opposition	Venue	Date
3/17	Abdur Razzak	Zimbabwe	Sheikh Abu Naser Stadium, Khulna, Bangladesh	28 November 2006
4/16	Abdur Razzak	South Africa	New Wanderers Stadium, Johannesburg, South Africa	5 November 2008
5/13	Elias Sunny	Ireland	Civil Service Cricket Club Ground, Belfast, Northern Ireland	18 July 2012
6/10	Mustafizur Rahman	United States	Prairie View Cricket Complex, Houston, USA	25 May 2024
Last Updated: 25 May 2024

=== Best Bowling Figure against each opponent ===
Opposition	Player	Figures	Date
Afghanistan	Mohammad Saifuddin	4/33	15 September 2019
Australia	Shakib Al Hasan	4/9	9 August 2021
England	Shoriful Islam	1/26	27 October 2021 ‡
England	Nasum Ahmed	1/26	27 October 2021 ‡
Hong Kong	Shakib Al Hasan	3/9	20 March 2014 ‡
India	Al-Amin Hossain	3/37	24 February 2016
Ireland	Elias Sunny	5/13	18 July 2012
Kenya	Abdur Razzak	2/22	1 September 2007 ‡
Nepal	Al-Amin Hossain	2/17	18 March 2014 ‡
Netherlands	Mashrafe Mortaza	2/22	25 July 2012
New Zealand	Mustafizur Rahman	5/22	26 March 2016 ‡
Oman	Shakib Al Hasan	4/15	13 March 2016 ‡
Pakistan	Mahmudullah	3/10	22 November 2021 ‡
Papua New Guinea	Shakib Al Hasan	4/9	21 October 2021 ‡
Scotland	Mahedi Hasan	3/19	17 October 2021 ‡
South Africa	Abdur Razzak	4/16	5 November 2008
Sri Lanka	Mustafizur Rahman	4/21	6 April 2017
United Arab Emirates	Mahmudullah	2/5	26 February 2016
West Indies	Shakib Al Hasan	5/20	20 December 2018
Zimbabwe	Mosaddek Hossain	5/20	31 July 2022
Last updated: 31 July 2022

=== Best career average ===
A bowler's bowling average is the total number of runs they have conceded divided by the number of wickets they have taken. Afghanistan's Rashid Khan holds the record for the best career average in T20Is with 12.62. Ajantha Mendis, Sri Lankan cricketer, is second behind Rashid with an overall career average of 14.42 runs per wicket. Al-Amin Hossain with an average of 16.98 is the highest ranked Bangladeshi bowler.

Rank	Average	Player	Wickets	Runs	Balls	Period
1	16.97	Al-Amin Hossain	43	730	614	2013–2020
2	19.04	Abdur Razzak	44	838	730	2006–2014
3	20.91	Shakib Al Hasan	149	3,117	2,745	2006–2024
4	21.44	Mustafizur Rahman†	129	2,766	2,230	2015–2024
5	23.14	Nasum Ahmed†	34	787	645	2021–2023
Qualification: 500 balls. Last Updated: 7 October 2024

=== Best career economy rate ===
A bowler's economy rate is the total number of runs they have conceded divided by the number of overs they have bowled. New Zealand's Daniel Vettori, holds the T20I record for the best career economy rate with 5.70.

Rank	Economy rate	Player	Wickets	Runs	Balls	Period
1	6.57	Mahedi Hasan†	38	1,087	992	2018–2024
2	6.81	Shakib Al Hasan	149	3,117	2,745	2006–2024
3	6.88	Abdur Razzak	44	838	730	2006–2014
4	7.04	Mahmudullah†	40	1,094	932	2007–2024
5	7.13	Al-Amin Hossain	43	730	614	2013–2020
Qualification: 300 balls. Last Updated: 7 October 2024

=== Best career strike rate ===
A bowler's strike rate is the total number of balls they have bowled divided by the number of wickets they have taken. The top bowler with the best T20I career strike rate is Rashid Khan of Afghanistan with strike rate of 12.3 balls per wicket. Al-Amin Hossain is the Bangladeshi bowler with the lowest strike rate.

Rank	Strike rate	Player	Wickets	Runs	Balls	Period
1	14.2	Al-Amin Hossain	43	730	614	2013–2020
2	16.5	Abdur Razzak	44	838	730	2006–2014
3	17.5	Mustafizur Rahman†	129	2,766	2,230	2015–2024
4	18.1	Shoriful Islam†	46	1,132	834	2021–2024
5	18.4	Shakib Al Hasan	149	3,117	2,745	2006–2024
Qualification: 500 balls. Last Updated: 7 October 2024

=== Most four-wickets (& over) hauls in an innings ===
Pakistan's Umar Gul has taken the most four-wickets (or over) among all the bowlers. Shakib Al Hasan has taken most such hauls for Bangladesh.

Rank	Four-wicket hauls	Player	Innings	Balls	Wickets	Period
1	8	Shakib Al Hasan	126	2,745	149	2006–2024
2	5	Mustafizur Rahman†	103	2,230	129	2015–2024
3	3	Nasum Ahmed†	34	645	34	2021–2023
4	2	Taskin Ahmed†	66	1,409	72	2014–2024
Last Updated: 7 October 2024

=== Best economy rates in an inning ===
The best economy rate in an inning, when a minimum of 12 balls are delivered by the bowler, is Sri Lankan player Nuwan Kulasekara economy of 0.00 during his spell of 0 runs for 1 wicket in 2 overs against Netherlands at Zohur Ahmed Chowdhury Stadium in the 2014 ICC World Twenty20. Mahmudullah holds the Bangladeshi record during his spell in 2014 ICC World Twenty20 at Mirpur, Bangladesh.

Rank	Economy	Player	Overs	Runs	Wickets	Opposition	Venue	Date
1	2.00	Mahmudullah †	4	8	1	Afghanistan	Sher-e-Bangla National Cricket Stadium, Mirpur, Bangladesh	16 March 2014 ‡
2	2.25	Abdur Razzak	4	9	2	Ireland	Civil Service Cricket Club Ground, Belfast, Northern Ireland	18 July 2012
2	2.25	Shakib Al Hasan †	4	9	3	Hong Kong	Zohur Ahmed Chowdhury Stadium, Chittagong, Bangladesh	20 March 2014 ‡
2	2.25	Mustafizur Rahman †	4	9	0	Australia	Sher-e-Bangla National Cricket Stadium, Mirpur, Bangladesh	6 August 2021
2	2.25	Mustafizur Rahman †	4	9	2	Australia	Sher-e-Bangla National Cricket Stadium, Mirpur, Bangladesh	9 August 2021
2	2.25	Shakib Al Hasan †	4	9	4	Papua New Guinea	Oman Cricket Academy Ground, Muscat	21 October 2021 ‡
Qualification: 12 balls bowled. Last Updated: 4 November 2021

=== Best strike rates in an inning ===
The best strike rate in an inning, when a minimum of 4 wickets are taken by the player, is by Steve Tikolo of Kenya during his spell of 4/2 in 1.2 overs against Scotland during the 2013 ICC World Twenty20 Qualifier at ICC Academy, Dubai, UAE. Shakib Al Hasan, Abdur Razzak and Mustafizur Rahman have the best strike rate among Bangladeshi bowlers.

Rank	Strike rate	Player	Wickets	Runs	Balls	Opposition	Venue	Date
1	4.5	Abdur Razzak	4	16	18	South Africa	New Wanderers Stadium, Johannesburg, South Africa	5 November 2008
1	4.5	Shakib Al Hasan †	4	15	18	Oman	Himachal Pradesh Cricket Association Stadium, Dharamshala, India	13 March 2016 ‡
1	4.5	Mustafizur Rahman †	4	21	18	Sri Lanka	Ranasinghe Premadasa Stadium, Colombo, Sri Lanka	6 April 2017
4	4.8	Elias Sunny	5	13	24	Ireland	Civil Service Cricket Club Ground, Belfast, Northern Ireland	18 July 2012
4	4.8	Mustafizur Rahman †	5	22	24	New Zealand	Eden Gardens, Kolkata, India	26 March 2016 ‡
4	4.8	Shakib Al Hasan †	5	20	24	West Indies	Sher-e-Bangla National Cricket Stadium, Mirpur, Bangladesh	20 December 2018
4	4.8	Mosaddek Hossain †	5	20	24	Zimbabwe	Harare Sports Club, Harare, Zimbabwe	31 July 2022
Last Updated: 31 July 2022

=== Worst figures in an innings ===
The worst figures in a T20I came in the Sri Lanka's tour of Australia when Kasun Rajitha of Sri Lanka had figures of 0/75 off his four overs at Adelaide Oval, Adelaide. The worst figures by a Bangladeshi is 0/63 that came off the bowling of Mashrafe Mortaza in the 2014 ICC World Twenty20 at Sher-e-Bangla National Cricket Stadium, Mirpur, Bangladesh.

Rank	Figures	Player	Overs	Opposition	Venue	Date
1	0/63	Mashrafe Mortaza	4	Pakistan	Sher-e-Bangla National Cricket Stadium, Mirpur, Bangladesh	30 March 2014 ‡
2	0/54	Shahadat Hossain	4	Sri Lanka	Pallekele International Cricket Stadium, Kandy, Sri Lanka	31 March 2013
3	0/53	Mashrafe Mortaza	4	Pakistan	Gymkhana Club Ground, Nairobi, Kenya	2 September 2007
4	0/51	Rubel Hossain	4	South Africa	North West Cricket Stadium, Potchefstroom, South Africa	29 October 2017
5	0/50	Shoriful Islam	4	New Zealand	Seddon Park, Hamilton, New Zealand	28 March 2021
5	0/50	Shakib Al Hasan	4	Australia	Sher-e-Bangla National Cricket Stadium, Mirpur, Bangladesh	7 August 2021
Last Updated: 7 August 2021

=== Most runs conceded in a match ===
Kasun Rajitha also holds the dubious distinction of most runs conceded in a T20I during the aforementioned match. Mortaza in the above-mentioned spell and Rubel Hossain with figures of 2/63 off his four overs against West Indies in December 2012 hold the most runs conceded distinction for Bangladesh.

Rank	Figures	Player	Overs	Opposition	Venue	Date
1	2/63	Rubel Hossain	4	West Indies	Sher-e-Bangla National Cricket Stadium, Mirpur, Bangladesh	10 December 2012
1	0/63	Mashrafe Mortaza	4	Pakistan	Sher-e-Bangla National Cricket Stadium, Mirpur, Bangladesh	30 March 2014 ‡
3	2/55	Farhad Reza	4	Pakistan	Gymkhana Club Ground, Nairobi, Kenya	2 September 2007
3	1/55	Mohammad Ashraful	4	West Indies	New Wanderers Stadium, Johannesburg, South Africa	13 September 2007 ‡
5	0/54	Shahadat Hossain	4	Sri Lanka	Pallekele International Cricket Stadium, Kandy, Sri Lanka	31 March 2013
Last updated:1 July 2020

=== Most wickets in a calendar year ===
Australia's Andrew Tye holds the record for most wickets taken in a year when he took 31 wickets in 2018 in 19 T20Is. Al-Amin Hossain with 22 wickets in 2016 is the leading Bangladeshi bowler on this list.

Rank	Wickets	Player	Innings	Year
1	28	Mustafizur Rahman	20	2021
2	26	Rishad Hossain†	19	2024
3	25	Shakib Al Hasan	19	2021
4	24	Mustafizur Rahman†	16	2024
5	23	Mahedi Hasan	24	2021
Last Updated: 7 October 2024

=== Most wickets in a series ===
2019 ICC World Twenty20 Qualifier at UAE saw records set for the most wickets taken by a bowler in a T20I series when Oman's pacer Bilal Khan tool 18 wickets during the series. Al-Amin Hossain in the 2016 Asia Cup took 11 wickets, the most for a Bangladeshi bowler in a series.

Rank	Wickets	Player	Matches	Series
1	11	Al-Amin Hossain	5	2016 Asia Cup
2	10	Al-Amin Hossain	7	2014 ICC World Twenty20
2	10	Shakib Al Hasan †	7	2016 ICC World Twenty20
4	9	Mustafizur Rahman †	3	2016 ICC World Twenty20
5	8	Elias Sunny	3	Bangladesh in Ireland in 2012
5	8	Shakib Al Hasan †	7	2014 ICC World Twenty20
5	8	Al-Amin Hossain	7	2016 ICC World Twenty20
5	8	Mustafizur Rahman †	3	Bangladesh in West Indies in 2018
5	8	Shakib Al Hasan †	3	West Indies in Bangladesh in 2018-19
5	8	Nasum Ahmed †	5	Australia in Bangladesh in 2021
5	8	Mustafizur Rahman †	4	New Zealand in Bangladesh in 2021
5	8	Nasum Ahmed †	5	New Zealand in Bangladesh in 2021
Last Updated: 10 September 2021

== Wicket-keeping records ==
The wicket-keeper is a specialist fielder who stands behind the stumps being guarded by the batsman on strike and is the only member of the fielding side allowed to wear gloves and leg pads.

=== Most career dismissals ===
A wicket-keeper can be credited with the dismissal of a batsman in two ways, caught or stumped. A fair catch is taken when the ball is caught fully within the field of play without it bouncing after the ball has touched the striker's bat or glove holding the bat, Laws 5.6.2.2 and 5.6.2.3 state that the hand or the glove holding the bat shall be regarded as the ball striking or touching the bat while a stumping occurs when the wicket-keeper puts down the wicket while the batsman is out of his ground and not attempting a run. Mushfiqur Rahim is the highest ranked Bangladeshi wicket keeper in the all-time list of taking most dismissals in T20Is as a designated wicket-keeper, which is headed by India's MS Dhoni and West Indian Denesh Ramdin.

Rank	Dismissals	Player	Matches	Innings	Period
1	62	Mushfiqur Rahim	102	82	2006–2022
2	30	Nurul Hasan†	46	45	2016–2022
3	29	Liton Das†	90	32	2015–2024
4	6	Jaker Ali†	18	9	2023–2024
5	3	Anamul Haque†	20	2	2014–2022
Last updated: 7 October 2024

=== Most career catches ===
Rahim has taken the most catches in T20Is as a designated wicket-keeper with Dhoni and Ramdin leading the all-time list.

Rank	Catches	Player	Matches	Innings	Period
1	32	Mushfiqur Rahim †	102	82	2006-2022
2	21	Nurul Hasan	46	45	2016-2022
3	8	Liton Das †	70	15	2015-2023
4	2	Anamul Haque	20	2	2014-2022
Last Updated: 4 November 2021

=== Most career stumpings ===
Carey has made the most stumpings in T20Is as a designated wicket-keeper among Bangladeshi with Dhoni and Kamran Akmal of Pakistan heading this all-time list.

Rank	Stumpings	Player	Matches	Innings	Period
1	29	Mushfiqur Rahim †	99	80	2006-2020
2	7	Nurul Hasan	27	27	2016-2021
3	1	Dhiman Ghosh	1	1	2008-2008
3	1	Liton Das †	46	8	2015-2021
Last Updated: 4 November 2021

=== Most dismissals in an innings ===
Four wicket-keepers on four occasions have taken five dismissals in a single innings in a T20I.

The feat of taking 4 dismissals in an innings has been achieved by 19 wicket-keepers on 26 occasions.

Rank	Dismissals	Player	Opposition	Venue	Date
1	3	Mushfiqur Rahim †	West Indies	New Wanderers Stadium, Johannesburg, South Africa	13 September 2007
1	3	Nurul Hasan †	Papua New Guinea	Oman Cricket Academy, Muscat, Oman	21 October 2021 ‡
3	2	3 Bangladeshi wicket-keepers on 20 occasions have affected 2 dismissials in an inning.			
Last Updated: 21 October 2021

=== Most dismissals in a series ===
Netherlands wicket-keeper Scott edwards holds the T20Is record for the most dismissals taken by a wicket-keeper in a series. He made 13 dismissals during the 2019 ICC World Twenty20 Qualifier. Bangladeshi record is held by Rahim when he made 7 dismissals during the 2007 ICC World Twenty20.

Rank	Dismissals	Player	Matches	Innings	Series
1	7	Mushfiqur Rahim †	5	5	2007 ICC World Twenty20
2	6	Mushfiqur Rahim †	7	7	2014 ICC World Twenty20
3	5	Nurul Hasan	5	5	New Zealand in Bangladesh in 2021
3	5	Nurul Hasan	5	5	2021 ICC Men's T20 World Cup
5	4	Mushfiqur Rahim †	3	3	Bangladesh in Ireland in 2012
5	4	Mushfiqur Rahim †	7	6	2016 ICC World Twenty20
5	4	Nurul Hasan	5	5	Australia in Bangladesh in 2021
Last Updated: 4 November 2021

== Fielding records ==
=== Most career catches ===
Caught is one of the nine methods a batsman can be dismissed in cricket. (Note: In 2017, The Laws of Cricket were amended, reducing the methods of dismissals from ten to nine, with handled the ball now covered as part of obstructing the field.) The majority of catches are caught in the slips, located behind the batsman, next to the wicket-keeper, on the off side of the field. Most slip fielders are top order batsmen.

South Africa's David Miller holds the record for the most catches in T20Is by a non-wicket-keeper with 57, followed by Shoaib Malik of Pakistan on 50 and New Zealand's Martin Guptill with 47. Mahmudullah is the leading catcher for Bangladesh.

Rank	Catches	Player	Innings	Period
1	51	Mahmudullah	138	2007–2024
2	46	Soumya Sarkar†	84	2015–2024
3	31	Shakib Al Hasan	127	2006–2024
4	30	Najmul Hossain Shanto†	49	2019–2024
5	29	Litton Das†	57	2015–2024
Last Updated: 13 October 2024

=== Most catches in an innings ===
The feat of taking 4 catches in an innings has been achieved by 14 fielders on 14 occasions. No Bangladeshi fielder has achieved this feat. The most is three catches on seven occasions.

Rank	Dismissals	Player	Opposition	Venue	Date
1	3	Elias Sunny	Ireland	Civil Service Cricket Club Ground, Belfast, Northern Ireland	21 July 2012
1	3	Sabbir Rahman †	Zimbabwe	Sheikh Abu Naser Stadium, Khulna, Bangladesh	20 January 2016
1	3	Mashrafe Mortaza	United Arab Emirates	Sher-e-Bangla National Cricket Stadium, Mirpur, Bangladesh	26 February 2016
1	3	Sabbir Rahman †	Pakistan	Sher-e-Bangla National Cricket Stadium, Mirpur, Bangladesh	2 March 2016
1	3	Sabbir Rahman †	Sri Lanka	Ranasinghe Premadasa Stadium, Colombo, Sri Lanka	10 March 2018
1	3	Mustafizur Rahman †	Afghanistan	Zohur Ahmed Chowdhury Stadium, Chittagong, Bangladesh	21 September 2019
1	3	Liton Das †	Zimbabwe	Sher-e-Bangla National Cricket Stadium, Mirpur, Bangladesh	9 March 2020
1	3	Mahmudullah †	Australia	Sher-e-Bangla National Cricket Stadium, Mirpur, Bangladesh	9 August 2021
Last Updated: 9 August 2021

=== Most catches in a series ===
The 2019 ICC Men's T20 World Cup Qualifier, which saw Netherlands retain their title, saw the record set for the most catches taken by a non-wicket-keeper in a T20I series. Jersey's Ben Stevens and Namibia's JJ Smit took 10 catches in the series. Soumya Sarkar during the 2016 Asia Cup and Sabbir Rahman during the 2018 Nidahas Trophy are the leading Bangladeshi filder on this list with 6 catches each.

Rank	Catches	Player	Matches	Innings	Series
1	6	Soumya Sarkar †	5	5	2016 Asia Cup
1	6	Sabbir Rahman †	5	5	2018 Nidahas Trophy
1	6	Mohammad Naim †	7	7	2021 ICC Men's T20 World Cup
4	5	Mahmudullah †	5	5	Australian cricket team in Bangladesh in 2021
4	5	Mushfiqur Rahim †	5	5	New Zealand in Bangladesh in 2021-22
Last Updated: 4 November 2021

== Other records ==
=== Most career matches ===
Rank	Matches	Player	Runs	Wkts	Period
1	141	Mahmudullah	2,444	41	2007–2024
2	129	Shakib Al Hasan	2,551	149	2006–2024
3	106	Mustafizur Rahman†	87	132	2015–2024
4	102	Mushfiqur Rahim	1,500	-	2006–2022
5	92	Litton Das†	2,003	-	2015–2024
Last Updated: 13 October 2024

=== Most consecutive career matches ===
Afghanistan's Mohammad Shahzad and Asghar Afghan hold the record for the most consecutive T20I matches played with 58. Mahmudullah holds the Bangladeshi record.

Rank	Matches	Player	Period
1	61	Afif Hossain	2019-2023
2	54	Mahmudullah †	2015-2021
3	30	Soumya Sarkar	2016-2018
4	29	Sabbir Rahman	2015-2018
4	29	Liton Das	2018-2021
Last updated: 4 November 2024

=== Most matches as captain ===
MS Dhoni, who led the Indian cricket team from 2007 to 2016, holds the record for the most matches played as captain in T20Is with 72.

Rank	Matches	Player	Won	Lost	Tied	NR	Win %	Period
1	43	Mahmudullah	16	26	0	1	38.09	2018-2022
2	39	Shakib Al Hasan	16	23	0	0	41.02	2009-2023
3	28	Mashrafe Mortaza	10	17	0	1	37.04	2014-2017
4	23	Mushfiqur Rahim	8	14	0	1	36.36	2011-2016
5	20	Najmul Hossain Shanto†	10	9	0	1	52.63	2023-2024
Last Updated: 23 June 2024

==== Most man of the match awards ====
Rank	M.O.M. Awards	Player	Matches	Period
1	12	Shakib Al Hasan	129	2006–2024
2	5	Mahmudullah	141	2007–2024
3	4	Soumya Sarkar†	85	2015–2024
3	4	Mushfiqur Rahim	102	2006–2022
Last updated: 22 September 2024

==== Most man of the series awards ====
Rank	M.O.S. Awards	Player	Matches	Period
1	5	Shakib Al Hasan	129	2006–2024
2	1	Nasum Ahmed†	35	2021–2023
2	1	Shoriful Islam†	42	2021–2024
2	1	Sabbir Rahman†	48	2014–2022
2	1	Najmul Hossain Shanto†	49	2019–2024
2	1	Taskin Ahmed†	70	2014–2024
2	1	Soumya Sarkar†	85	2015–2024
2	1	Litton Das†	92	2015–2024
2	1	Mustafizur Rahman†	106	2015–2024
Last updated: 22 September 2024

=== Youngest players on Debut ===
The youngest player to play in a T20I match is Marian Gherasim at the age of 14 years and 16 days. Making his debut for Romania against the Bulgaria on 16 October 2020 in the first T20I of the 2020 Balkan Cup thus becoming the youngest to play in a men's T20I match.

Rank	Age	Player	Opposition	Venue	Date
1	18 years and 146 days	Afif Hossain	Sri Lanka	Sher-e-Bangla National Cricket Stadium, Mirpur, Bangladesh	15 February 2018
2	18 years and 165 days	Tamim Iqbal	Kenya	Gymkhana Club Ground, Nairobi, Kenya	1 September 2007
3	18 years and 363 days	Taskin Ahmed	Australia	Sher-e-Bangla National Cricket Stadium, Mirpur, Bangladesh	1 April 2014
4	19 years and 156 days	Rubel Hossain	India	Trent Bridge, Nottingham, England	6 June 2009
5	19 years and 163 days	Mehidy Hasan Miraz	Sri Lanka	Ranasinghe Premadasa Stadium, Colombo, Sri Lanka	6 April 2017
Last Updated: 28 March 2021

=== Oldest Players on Debut ===
The Turkish batsmen Osman Göker is the oldest player to make their debut a T20I match. Playing in the 2019 Continental Cup against Romania at Moara Vlasiei Cricket Ground, Moara Vlăsiei he was aged 59 years and 181 days.

Rank	Age	Player	Opposition	Venue	Date
1	36 years and 84 days	Mohammad Rafique	Zimbabwe	Sheikh Abu Naser Stadium, Khulna, Bangladesh	28 November 2006
2	29 years and 65 days	Shuvagata Hom	Zimbabwe	Sheikh Abu Naser Stadium, Khulna, Bangladesh	15 January 2016
3	27 years and 218 days	Taijul Islam	Zimbabwe	Sher-e-Bangla National Cricket Stadium, Mirpur, Bangladesh	13 September 2019
4	27 years and 136 days	Arafat Sunny	Sri Lanka	Zohur Ahmed Chowdhury Stadium, Chittagong, Bangladesh	12 February 2014
5	27 years and 111 days	Saqlain Sajib	Australia	M. Chinnaswamy Stadium, Bangalore, India	21 March 2016
Last Updated: 28 March 2021

=== Oldest Players ===
The Turkish batsmen Osman Göker is the oldest player to appear in a T20I match during the same above mentioned match.

Rank	Age	Player	Opposition	Venue	Date
1	38 years and 245 days	Mahmudullah †	India	Shrimant Madhavrao Scindia Cricket Stadium, Gwalior, India	6 October 2024
3	37 years and 92 days	Shakib Al Hasan	Afghanistan	Arnos Vale Ground, Kingstown, West Indies	24 June 2024
3	36 years and 84 days	Mohammad Rafique	Zimbabwe	Sheikh Abu Naser Stadium, Khulna, Bangladesh	28 November 2006
4	35 years and 115 days	Mushfiqur Rahim	Sri Lanka	Dubai International Cricket Stadium, Dubai, UAE	1 September 2022
5	33 years and 183 days	Mashrafe Mortaza	Sri Lanka	R Premadasa Stadium, Colombo, Sri Lanka	6 April 2017
Last Updated: 7 October 2024

== Partnership records ==
In cricket, two batsmen are always present at the crease batting together in a partnership. This partnership will continue until one of them is dismissed, retires or the innings comes to a close.

=== Highest partnerships by wicket ===
A wicket partnership describes the number of runs scored before each wicket falls. The first wicket partnership is between the opening batsmen and continues until the first wicket falls. The second wicket partnership then commences between the not out batsman and the number three batsman. This partnership continues until the second wicket falls. The third wicket partnership then commences between the not out batsman and the new batsman. This continues down to the tenth wicket partnership. When the tenth wicket has fallen, there is no batsman left to partner so the innings is closed.

Wicket	Runs	First batsman	Second batsman	Opposition	Venue	Date
1st Wicket	124	Litton Das	Rony Talukdar	Ireland	Zohur Ahmed Chowdhury Stadium, Chittagong	29 March 2023
2nd Wicket	132*	Mahmudullah	Tamim Iqbal	West Indies	Sher-e-Bangla National Cricket Stadium, Mirpur, Bangladesh	10 December 2012
3rd Wicket	112	Mushfiqur Rahim	Shakib Al Hasan	Australia	Sher-e-Bangla National Cricket Stadium, Mirpur, Bangladesh	1 April 2014
4th Wicket	105*	Sabbir Rahman	Shakib Al Hasan	Pakistan	Sher-e-Bangla National Cricket Stadium, Mirpur, Bangladesh	24 April 2015
5th Wicket	91*	Mahmudullah	Shakib Al Hasan	West Indies	Sher-e-Bangla National Cricket Stadium, Mirpur, Bangladesh	20 December 2018
6th Wicket	57	Mahmudullah	Nurul Hasan	Zimbabwe	Sheikh Abu Naser Stadium, Khulna, Bangladesh	22 January 2016
6th Wicket	57	Mahmudullah	Mosaddek Hossain	Sri Lanka	Ranasinghe Premadasa Stadium, Colombo, Sri Lanka	4 April 2017
7th Wicket	82	Afif Hossain	Mosaddek Hossain	Zimbabwe	Sher-e-Bangla National Cricket Stadium, Mirpur, Bangladesh	13 September 2019
8th Wicket	41	Rishad Hossain	Taskin Ahmed	Sri Lanka	Trent Bridge, Sylhet, Bangladesh	9 March 2024
8th Wicket	41*	Shamim Hossain	Tanzim Hasan Shakib	West Indies	Kingston	17 December 2024
9th Wicket	44	Jakir Ali	Hasan Mahmud	United Arab Emirates	Sher-e-Bangla National Cricket Stadium, Mirpur, Bangladesh	22 December 2018
10th Wicket	34*	Mohammad Saifuddin	Rubel Hossain	South Africa	Goodyear Park, Bloemfontein, South Africa	26 October 2017
Last Updated: 25 July 2021

=== Highest partnerships by runs ===
The highest T20I partnership by runs for any wicket is held by the Afghan pairing of Hazratullah Zazai and Usman Ghani who put together an opening wicket partnership of 236 runs during the Ireland v Afghanistan series in India in 2019

Wicket	Runs	First batsman	Second batsman	Opposition	Venue	Date
2nd Wicket	132*	Mahmudullah	Tamim Iqbal	West Indies	Sher-e-Bangla National Cricket Stadium, Mirpur, Bangladesh	10 December 2012
2nd Wicket	118	Shakib Al Hasan	Shamsur Rahman	Zimbabwe	Queens Sports Club, Bulawayo, Zimbabwe	11 May 2013
3rd Wicket	112	Shakib Al Hasan	Mushfiqur Rahim	Australia	Sher-e-Bangla National Cricket Stadium, Mirpur, Bangladesh	1 April 2014
3rd Wicket	109	Aftab Ahmed	Mohammad Ashraful	West Indies	New Wanderers Stadium, Johannesburg, South Africa	13 September 2007
4th Wicket	105*	Sabbir Rahman	Shakib Al Hasan	Pakistan	Sher-e-Bangla National Cricket Stadium, Mirpur, Bangladesh	24 April 2015
Last Updated: 28 March 2021

=== Highest overall partnership runs by a pair ===
Rank	Runs	Innings	Players	Highest	Average	100/50	T20I career span
1	755	28	Mahmudullah & Mushfiqur Rahim	84	31.45	0/5	2007–2022
2	749	34	Mahmudullah & Shakib Al Hasan	91*	22.69	0/1	2007–2024
3	698	34	Mushfiqur Rahim & Shakib Al Hasan	112	20.52	1/2	2006–2022
4	645	24	Litton Das & Najmul Hossain Shanto †	84	26.87	0/3	2019–2025
5	521	22	Afif Hossain & Mahmudullah	63	26.05	0/2	2019–2022
An asterisk (*) signifies an unbroken partnership (i.e. neither of the batsmen was dismissed before either the end of the allotted overs or the required score being reached). Last updated: 23 May 2025

== Umpiring records ==
=== Most matches umpired ===
An umpire in cricket is a person who officiates the match according to the Laws of Cricket. Two umpires adjudicate the match on the field, whilst a third umpire has access to video replays, and a fourth umpire looks after the match balls and other duties. The records below are only for on-field umpires.

Ahsan Raza of Pakistan holds the record for the most T20I matches umpired with 79. The most experienced Bangladeshi umpire is Sharfuddoula with 51 matches.

Rank	Matches	Umpire	Period
1	52	Sharfuddoula †	2011-2024
2	34	Masudur Rahman †	2018-2024
3	31	Gazi Sohel	2018-2024
4	13	Anisur Rahman	2012-2018
5	11	Tanvir Ahmed †	2018-2021
Last Updated: 23 May 2025

== See also ==
- List of Bangladesh Test cricket records
- List of Bangladesh One Day International cricket records
- List of Twenty20 International records
- List of Test cricket records
- List of Cricket World Cup records
