= New Zealand cricket team in Bangladesh in 2021–22 =

International cricket tour

	Bangladesh	New Zealand
- Dates: 1 – 10 September 2021
Captains	Mahmudullah	Tom Latham

Twenty20 International series
- Results: Bangladesh won the 5-match series 3–2
Most runs	Mahmudullah (120)	Tom Latham (159)
Most wickets	Nasum Ahmed (8); Mustafizur Rahman (8)	Ajaz Patel (10)
- Player of the series: Nasum Ahmed (Ban); Tom Latham (NZ)

The New Zealand cricket team toured Bangladesh in September 2021 to play five Twenty20 International (T20I) matches. The matches were used as preparation ahead of the 2021 ICC Men's T20 World Cup. Initially, New Zealand were scheduled to play three T20I matches, but in May 2021, two more matches were added to the schedule. The schedule for the tour was confirmed in August 2021.

Tom Latham was named as New Zealand's captain, with Kane Williamson being unavailable due to him playing in the rescheduled phase of the 2021 Indian Premier League. A warm-up match for the New Zealand team at the Bangladesh Krira Shikkha Protisthan in Savar was scheduled to take place, but was later cancelled. The New Zealand team arrived in Bangladesh on 24 August 2021.

Bangladesh won the first match of the series by seven wickets, to record their first win against New Zealand in T20I cricket. Bangladesh then won the second T20I by four runs, with New Zealand winning the third match by 52 runs. Bangladesh won the fourth T20I by six wickets to record their first T20I series win against New Zealand. New Zealand won the fifth and final T20I match by 27 runs, with Bangladesh winning the series 3–2.

== Squads ==
T20Is
Bangladesh	New Zealand
Mahmudullah (c); Nasum Ahmed; Taskin Ahmed; Litton Das (wk); Mahedi Hasan; Nurul Hasan (wk); Shakib Al Hasan; Afif Hossain; Mosaddek Hossain; Rubel Hossain; Shamim Hossain; Aminul Islam; Shoriful Islam; Taijul Islam; Mohammad Naim; Mushfiqur Rahim (wk); Mustafizur Rahman; Mohammad Saifuddin; Soumya Sarkar	Tom Latham (c, wk); Finn Allen; Hamish Bennett; Tom Blundell (wk); Doug Bracewell; Colin de Grandhomme; Jacob Duffy; Matt Henry; Scott Kuggeleijn; Cole McConchie; Henry Nicholls; Ajaz Patel; Rachin Ravindra; Ben Sears; Blair Tickner; Will Young

Upon the team's arrival in Bangladesh, New Zealand's Finn Allen tested positive for COVID-19. No immediate decision was made regarding the need for a replacement for Allen, with Matt Henry named as cover for Allen three days later. Following the first T20I, Allen returned to the New Zealand bubble, after providing two negative tests.

== T20I series ==
=== 1st T20I ===
1 September 2021
16:00 (D/N)
Scorecard

New Zealand; 60 (16.5 overs)	v	Bangladesh; 62/3 (15 overs)
Henry Nicholls 18 (24); Mustafizur Rahman 3/13 (2.5 overs)		Shakib Al Hasan 25 (33); Ajaz Patel 1/7 (4 overs)

Bangladesh won by 7 wickets
Sher-e-Bangla National Cricket Stadium, Dhaka
Umpires: Sharfuddoula (Ban) and Gazi Sohel (Ban)
Player of the match: Shakib Al Hasan (Ban)

- New Zealand won the toss and elected to bat.
- Cole McConchie and Rachin Ravindra (NZ) both made their T20I debuts.
- Tom Latham captained New Zealand for the first time in T20Is.
- This was the lowest total by any team against Bangladesh, and it was New Zealand's joint-lowest total in T20Is.
- Cole McConchie (NZ) took a wicket with his first ball in T20Is.

=== 2nd T20I ===
3 September 2021
16:00 (D/N)
Scorecard

Bangladesh; 141/6 (20 overs)	v	New Zealand; 137/5 (20 overs)
Mohammad Naim 39 (39); Rachin Ravindra 3/22 (4 overs)		Tom Latham 65* (49); Mahedi Hasan 2/12 (4 overs)

Bangladesh won by 4 runs
Sher-e-Bangla National Cricket Stadium, Dhaka
Umpires: Tanvir Ahmed (Ban) and Masudur Rahman (Ban)
Player of the match: Mahmudullah (Ban)

- Bangladesh won the toss and elected to bat.
- Ben Sears (NZ) made his T20I debut.

=== 3rd T20I ===
5 September 2021
16:00 (D/N)
Scorecard

New Zealand; 128/5 (20 overs)	v	Bangladesh; 76 (19.4 overs)
Henry Nicholls 36* (29); Mohammad Saifuddin 2/28 (4 overs)		Mushfiqur Rahim 20* (37); Ajaz Patel 4/16 (4 overs)

New Zealand won by 52 runs
Sher-e-Bangla National Cricket Stadium, Dhaka
Umpires: Masudur Rahman (Ban) and Sharfuddoula (Ban)
Player of the match: Ajaz Patel (NZ)

- New Zealand won the toss and elected to bat.
- Mahmudullah became the first cricketer for Bangladesh to play in 100 T20Is.

=== 4th T20I ===
8 September 2021
16:00 (D/N)
Scorecard

New Zealand; 93 (19.3 overs)	v	Bangladesh; 96/4 (19.1 overs)
Will Young 46 (48); Nasum Ahmed 4/10 (4 overs)		Mahmudullah 43* (48); Ajaz Patel 2/9 (4 overs)

Bangladesh won by 6 wickets
Sher-e-Bangla National Cricket Stadium, Dhaka
Umpires: Tanvir Ahmed (Ban) and Gazi Sohel (Ban)
Player of the match: Nasum Ahmed (Ban)

- New Zealand won the toss and elected to bat.

=== 5th T20I ===
10 September 2021
16:00 (D/N)
Scorecard

New Zealand; 161/5 (20 overs)	v	Bangladesh; 134/8 (20 overs)
Tom Latham 50* (37); Shoriful Islam 2/48 (4 overs)		Afif Hossain 49* (33); Ajaz Patel 2/21 (4 overs)

New Zealand won by 27 runs
Sher-e-Bangla National Cricket Stadium, Dhaka
Umpires: Tanvir Ahmed (Ban) and Sharfuddoula (Ban)
Player of the match: Tom Latham (NZ)

- New Zealand won the toss and elected to bat.
