= 2024 Bangladesh Premier League players' draft =

Cricket player selection

2024 Bangladesh Premier League players draft

General information
- Sport: Cricket
- Date: 24 September 2023
- Time: 12:00 pm BST
- Location: Radisson Blu Water Garden Dhaka

Overview
- League: Bangladesh Premier League
- Team: 7
- Expansion team: 1
- Expansion season: 2024

The players' draft for the 2024 Bangladesh Premier League took place on 24 September 2023 at the Radisson Blu Water Garden Dhaka.

== Players draft rules ==
1. Each team should have at least 12 players, ten being local players and two being foreign players.
2. Each team can sign only one local player through direct signing and at least nine local players are to be picked from the draft
3. There is no maximum limit of signing foreign players both directly and through the draft.

== Salary cap ==
=== Local players ===
216 local players were listed into seven categories with the following salary cap:-

- Category A – ৳80 lakh (US$65,000)
- Category B – ৳50 lakh (US$41,000)
- Category C – ৳30 lakh (US$24,000)
- Category D – ৳20 lakh (US$16,000)
- Category E – ৳15 lakh (US$12,000)
- Category F – ৳10 lakh (US$8,100)
- Category G – ৳5 lakh (US$4,100)

=== Foreign players ===
- Category A – US$80,000
- Category B – US$60,000
- Category C – US$40,000
- Category D – US$30,000
- Category E – US$20,000

== Drafted players ==
This is the list of drafted players in the players draft.

=== Chattogram Challengers ===
- Tanzid Hasan Tamim, Al Amin Hossain, Sykat Ali, Imranuzzaman, Curtis Campher, Bilal Khan, Shahadat Hossain, Salauddin Shakil

=== Comilla Victorians ===
- Mrittunjoy Chowdhury, Jaker Ali, Mahidul Islam, Rishad Hossain, Rahkeem Cornwall, Matthew Walter Ford, Imrul Kayes, Mushfiq Hasan, Enamul Haque

=== Durdanto Dhaka ===
- Saif Hassan, Irfan Sukkur, Alauddin Babu, Meherob Hossain, Lahiru Samarakoon, Sadeera Samarawickrama, Mohammad Naim, Sabbir Hossain, Jashimuddin

=== Fortune Barishal ===
Mushfiqur Rahim, Rakibul Hasan, Mohammad Saifuddin, Soumya Sarkar, Yannic Cariah, Kamrul Islam, Pritom Kumar, Taijul Islam, Prantik Nowrose Nabil, Dinesh Chandimal tami hossen

=== Khulna Tigers ===
- Afif Hossain, Rubel Hossain, Parvez Hossain, Habibur Rahman Sohan, Kasun Rajitha, Dasun Shanaka, Mukidul Islam, Akbar Ali, Sumon Khan

=== Rangpur Riders ===
- Rony Talukdar, Shamim Hossain, Ripon Mondol, Hasan Murad, Michael Rippon, Yasir Mohammad, Abu Hider, Fazle Rabbi, Ashikuzzaman

=== Sylhet Strikers ===
- Mohammad Mithun, Rejaur Rahman, Ariful Haque, Yasir Ali, Richard Ngarava, Dushanth Hemantha, Nazmul Islam, Shafiqul Islam, Nayeem Islam, Zawad Rowen, Salman Hossain

== Direct signing ==
This is the list of direct signings of every team and retention players.

Chattogram Challengers	Comilla Victorians	Durdanto Dhaka	Fortune Barishal	Khulna Tigers	Rangpur Riders	Sylhet Strikers
Shuvagata Hom Chowdhury; Ziaur Rahman; Nihaduzzaman; Shohidul Islam; Mohammad Haris; Nazibullah Zadran; Mohammad Hasnain; Stephen Eskinazi; Mohammad Waseem; Kusal Mendis; Abdullah Shafique; Nihaduzzaman; Husna Habib Mehedi; Avishka Fernando; Phil Salt; Romario Shepherd; Tom Bruce; Josh Brown; Hunain Shah; Jishan Alam	Towhid Hridoy; Moeen Ali; Andre Russell; Iftikhar Ahmed; Zaman Khan; Khushdil Shah; Johnson Charles; Noor Ahmad; Naseem Shah; Rashid Khan; Liton Das; Mustafizur Rahman; Tanvir Islam; Mohammad Rizwan; Sunil Narine; Aayan Afzal Khan; Aliss Islam; Roston Chase; Aamir Jamal; Raymon Reifer; Will Jacks; Brooke Guest	Mosaddek Hossain; Chaturanga de Silva; Saim Ayub; Usman Qadir; Taskin Ahmed; Arafat Sunny; Shoriful Islam; Aqib Ilyas; Lasith Croospulle; Danushka Gunathilaka; Alex Ross; Gulbadin Naib; Aqib Ilyas; Mohammad Irfan; Andre Mccarthy; Tahjibul Islam	Mahmudullah; Mehidy Hasan; Khaled Ahmed; Ibrahim Zadran; Tamim Iqbal; Shoaib Malik; Paul Stirling; Fakhar Zaman; Mohammad Amir; Abbas Afridi; Dunith Wellalage; ~~Mohammad Amir~~; ~~Naveen ul Haq~~; Mehedi Hasan Rana; David Miller; Akif Javed; Nuwan Thushara; Mohammad Imran; Kyle Mayers; Obed McCoy; Ahmed Shehzad; Keshav Maharaj	Anamul Haque Bijoy; Evin Lewis; Faheem Ashraf; Dhananjaya De Silva; Shai Hope; Nasum Ahmed; Nahidul Islam; Mahmudul Hasan Joy; Nahid Rana; Oshane Thomas; Mohammad Nawaz; Mark Deyal; Jason Holder; Wayne Parnell	Shakib Al Hasan; Babar Azam; Ihsanullah; Matheesha Pathirana; Brandon King; Wanindu Hasaranga; Nurul Hasan; Mahedi Hasan; Hasan Mahmud; Azmatullah Omarzai; Nicholas Pooran; Mohammad Nabi; Imran Tahir; Salman Irshad; Iftakhar Hossain Ifti; ~~Rassie van der Dussen~~; Dawid Malan; Jimmy Neesham; Dwaine Pretorius; Mominul Haque; Tom Moores; Reeza Hendricks	Mashrafe Mortaza; Zakir Hasan; Tanzim Hasan Sakib; Najmul Hossain Shanto; Ryan Burl; Ben Cutting; Harry Tector; Benny Howell; Samit Patel; Shannon Gabriel; Sunzamul Islam; Shamshur Rahman

== Retention players ==
=== Comilla Victorians ===
- Liton Das
- Mustafizur Rahman
- Tanvir Islam
- Mohammad Rizwan
- Sunil Narine

=== Chattogram Challengers ===
- Shuvagata Hom
- Mobarak Hossen
- Nihaduzzaman

=== Durdanto Dhaka ===
- Taskin Ahmed
- Arafat Sunny
- Shoriful Islam
- Aqib Ilyas

=== Fortune Barishal ===
- Mahmudullah
- Mehidy Hasan
- Khaled Ahmed

=== Khulna Tigers ===
- Nasum Ahmed
- Nahidul Islam
- Mahmudul Hasan Joy

=== Rangpur Riders ===
- Nurul Hasan
- Mahedi Hasan
- Hasan Mahmud
- Azmatullah Omarzai
- Nicholas Pooran

=== Sylhet Strikers ===
- Mashrafe Mortaza
- Zakir Hasan
- Tanzim Hasan Sakib

== Players list ==
This is the list of foreign listed in the draft.

=== A Category ===
Colin de Grandhomme (New Zealand), Adam Lyth (England), Shai Hope (West Indies), Izharulhaq Naveed (Afghanistan), Shan Masood (Pakistan), Jamie Overton (England), Angelo Mathews (Sri Lanka), Dasun Shanaka (Sri Lanka), Kusal Mendis (Sri Lanka), Dilshan Madushanka (Sri Lanka), Lahiru Kumara (Sri Lanka), Pathum Nissanka (Sri Lanka), Avishka Fernando (Sri Lanka), Charith Asalanka (Sri Lanka), Chamika Karunaratne (Sri Lanka), Haider Ali (Pakistan).

=== B Category ===
Rahkeem Cornwall (West Indies), Matthew Potts (England), Waqar Salamkhei (Afghanistan), Hazratullah Zazai (Afghanistan), Ryan Burl (Zimbabwe), Samit Patel (England), Adam Rossington (England), Jordan Clark (England), Isuru Udana (Sri Lanka), Ahmed Shehzad (Pakistan), Usama Mir (Pakistan), Mohammad Hafeez (Pakistan), Niroshan Dickwella (Sri Lanka), Lendl Simmons (West Indies), Yasir Shah (Pakistan), Saud Shakeel (Pakistan).

=== C Category ===
Scott Edwards ( Netherlands ), Smit Patel (USA), George Dockrell ( Ireland ), Sam Alexander (England), Dom Bess (England), Daniel James (England), Raymond Reifer (West Indies), Chadwick Walton (West Indies), Fabian Allen (West Indies), Fawad Ahmed (Australia), Nkrumah Bonner (West Indies), Roston Chase (West Indies), Lutho Sipamla (South Africa), Duanne Olivier (South Africa), Andrew Turner (England), Hardus Viljoen (South Africa), Joe Denly (England), Usman Shinwari (Pakistan), Sharjeel Khan (Pakistan ), Luke Wells (England), Michael Rippon (New Zealand), Sean Williams (Zimbabwe), Shahnawaz Dahani (Pakistan), Dinesh Chandimal (Sri Lanka), Kamran Akmal (Pakistan), Ross Whiteley (England), Danushka Gunathilaka (Sri Lanka), Jake Lintott (England), Wafadar Momand (Afghanistan), Dawlat Zadran (Afghanistan), Muhammad Waseem (UAE), Binura Fernando (Sri Lanka), Kasun Rajitha (Sri Lanka), Chaturanga de Silva (Sri Lanka), Ashen Bandara (Sri Lanka), Arshad Iqbal (Pakistan), Sadeera Samarawickrama (Sri Lanka), Dunith Wellalage ( Sri Lanka), Haris Sohail (Pakistan), Mohammad Imran (Pakistan), Abdullah Shafiq (Pakistan), Umaid Asif (Pakistan), Aamer Yamin (Pakistan), Amad Butt (Pakistan), Ahmed Daniyal (Pakistan), Sohaib Maqsood (Pakistan) .

=== E Category ===
Joshua De Silva (West Indies), Harry Tector (Ireland), Abhishek Chand (United States), Craig Ervine (Zimbabwe), Zafar Gohar (Pakistan), Mohammad Saleem (Afghanistan), Kesrick Williams (West Indies), Sharafuddin Ashraf (Afghanistan), Brandon McMullen (Scotland), Sohail Tanvir (Pakistan), Minod Bhanuka (Sri Lanka), Rohail Nazir (Pakistan), Sarfaraz Ahmed (Pakistan), Ramesh Mendis (Sri Lanka), Sahan Arachchig (Sri Lanka).
