= Australian cricket team in Bangladesh in 2021 =

International cricket tour

	Bangladesh	Australia
- Dates: 3 – 9 August 2021
Captains	Mahmudullah	Matthew Wade

Twenty20 International series
- Results: Bangladesh won the 5-match series 4–1
Most runs	Shakib Al Hasan (114)	Mitchell Marsh (156)
Most wickets	Nasum Ahmed (8)	Josh Hazlewood (8)
- Player of the series: Shakib Al Hasan (Ban)

The Australia cricket team toured Bangladesh in August 2021 to play five Twenty20 International (T20I) matches. The matches were used as preparation ahead of the 2021 ICC Men's T20 World Cup. Cricket Australia planned for the series to take place following their tour of the West Indies. It was the first bilateral T20I series between the two teams, and Australia's first tour of Bangladesh since 2017.

Bangladesh won the first T20I match by 23 runs, recording their first ever win in the format against Australia in five attempts. Bangladesh then won the second T20I by five wickets, and the third T20I by ten runs. Therefore, Bangladesh won the series with two matches to spare, and recorded their first ever series win in any format against Australia. Australia won the fourth T20I by three wickets, to avoid a whitewash. However, they lost the final match by 60 runs, with Bangladesh winning the series 4–1.

== Background ==
Although initially Australia were scheduled to play three T20I matches in October 2021, in April 2021, the Bangladesh Cricket Board (BCB) asked Cricket Australia to play five T20Is instead of three. In May 2021, both cricket boards agreed to play five T20Is in August 2021, following Australia's tour of the West Indies.

To avoid any sort of security or health risks, Cricket Australia requested three conditions of the BCB. Firstly they wanted the Australian players and staff to be taken to the team hotel from the Shahjalal International Airport immediately upon arrival, and secondly they wanted only the Australian players, including the individuals concerned to bio-secure bubble, to remain at the hotel. The BCB also wanted to organise the T20I matches in two venues, Mirpur and Chattagram to prevent the pitch from being hampered. However, Cricket Australia have requested that only one venue should be used for the entire series. The BCB later complied with the request, with all five matches scheduled to be played at the Sher-e-Bangla National Cricket Stadium in Dhaka. On 22 July 2021, the dates for the matches were confirmed. The series was not shown live in Australia due to a lack of a deal with broadcasters. It was the first time since the team's tour of Pakistan in 1994 that an overseas tour was not shown on Australian television.

== Squads ==
T20Is
Bangladesh	Australia
Mahmudullah (c); Nasum Ahmed; Taskin Ahmed; ~~Litton Das (wk)~~; Mahedi Hasan; Nurul Hasan (wk); Shakib Al Hasan; Afif Hossain; Mosaddek Hossain; Rubel Hossain; Shamim Hossain; Shoriful Islam; Taijul Islam; Mohammad Mithun; Mohammad Naim; Mustafizur Rahman; Mohammad Saifuddin; Soumya Sarkar	~~Aaron Finch (c)~~; Matthew Wade (c, wk); Ashton Agar; Wes Agar; Jason Behrendorff; Alex Carey (wk); Dan Christian; Nathan Ellis; Josh Hazlewood; Moises Henriques; Mitchell Marsh; Riley Meredith; Ben McDermott; Josh Philippe; Mitchell Starc; Mitchell Swepson; Ashton Turner; Andrew Tye; Adam Zampa

On 27 May 2021, Australia named a 23-man preliminary squad for the tour with Aaron Finch being named as their captain. On 8 June 2021, six more players were added to Australia's preliminary squad, with Australia confirming the final squad on 16 June 2021. Tanveer Sangha and Nathan Ellis were named as reserve players. Ellis was later moved up to Australia's full squad, covering for Riley Meredith. On 25 July 2021, Australia's captain Aaron Finch was ruled out of the tour due to an injury. The next day, Litton Das was ruled out of Bangladesh's squad due to a family matter. On 2 August 2021, Cricket Australia named Matthew Wade as the team captain in Finch's absence.

== T20I series ==
=== 1st T20I ===
3 August 2021
18:00 (N)
Scorecard

Bangladesh; 131/7 (20 overs)	v	Australia; 108 (20 overs)
Shakib Al Hasan 36 (33); Josh Hazlewood 3/24 (4 overs)		Mitchell Marsh 45 (45); Nasum Ahmed 4/19 (4 overs)

Bangladesh won by 23 runs
Sher-e-Bangla National Cricket Stadium, Dhaka
Umpires: Masudur Rahman (Ban) and Sharfuddoula (Ban)
Player of the match: Nasum Ahmed (Ban)

- Australia won the toss and elected to field.
- Mitchell Starc became the first bowler for Australia to take 50 wickets in T20Is.

=== 2nd T20I ===
4 August 2021
18:00 (N)
Scorecard

Australia; 121/7 (20 overs)	v	Bangladesh; 123/5 (18.4 overs)
Mitchell Marsh 45 (42); Mustafizur Rahman 3/23 (4 overs)		Afif Hossain 37* (31); Ashton Agar 1/17 (4 overs)

Bangladesh won by 5 wickets
Sher-e-Bangla National Cricket Stadium, Dhaka
Umpires: Tanvir Ahmed (Ban) and Masudur Rahman (Ban)
Player of the match: Afif Hossain (Ban)

- Australia won the toss and elected to bat.

=== 3rd T20I ===
6 August 2021
18:00 (N)
Scorecard

Bangladesh; 127/9 (20 overs)	v	Australia; 117/4 (20 overs)
Mahmudullah 52 (53); Nathan Ellis 3/34 (4 overs)		Mitchell Marsh 51 (47); Shoriful Islam 2/29 (4 overs)

Bangladesh won by 10 runs
Sher-e-Bangla National Cricket Stadium, Dhaka
Umpires: Sharfuddoula (Ban) and Gazi Sohel (Ban)
Player of the match: Mahmudullah (Ban)

- Bangladesh won the toss and elected to bat.
- Nathan Ellis (Aus) made his T20I debut, and became the first cricketer to take a hat-trick on debut in T20Is.

=== 4th T20I ===
7 August 2021
18:00 (N)
Scorecard

Bangladesh; 104/9 (20 overs)	v	Australia; 105/7 (19 overs)
Mohammad Naim 28 (36); Mitchell Swepson 3/12 (4 overs)		Dan Christian 39 (15); Mustafizur Rahman 2/9 (4 overs)

Australia won by 3 wickets
Sher-e-Bangla National Cricket Stadium, Dhaka
Umpires: Masudur Rahman (Ban) and Gazi Sohel (Ban)
Player of the match: Mitchell Swepson (Aus)

- Bangladesh won the toss and elected to bat.

=== 5th T20I ===
9 August 2021
18:00 (N)
Scorecard

Bangladesh; 122/8 (20 overs)	v	Australia; 62 (13.4 overs)
Mohammad Naim 23 (23); Nathan Ellis 2/16 (4 overs)		Matthew Wade 22 (22); Shakib Al Hasan 4/9 (3.4 overs)

Bangladesh won by 60 runs
Sher-e-Bangla National Cricket Stadium, Dhaka
Umpires: Tanvir Ahmed (Ban) and Sharfuddoula (Ban)
Player of the match: Shakib Al Hasan (Ban)

- Bangladesh won the toss and elected to bat.
- Shakib Al Hasan (Ban) became the second cricketer to take 100 wickets in T20Is.
- Shakib Al Hasan (Ban) also became the first cricketer to take 100 wickets and score 1,000 runs in T20Is.
- This was Australia's lowest total in T20Is.
