= Bangladeshi cricket team in the United Arab Emirates in 2022–23 =

International cricket tour

Bangladeshi cricket team in the UAE in 2022–23
	United Arab Emirates	Bangladesh
- Dates: 25 – 27 September 2022
Captains	Chundangapoyil Rizwan	Nurul Hasan

Twenty20 International series
- Results: Bangladesh won the 2-match series 2–0
Most runs	Chundangapoyil Rizwan (56)	Afif Hossain (95)
Most wickets	Aayan Afzal Khan (3); Karthik Meiyappan (3)	Shoriful Islam (3); Mehidy Hasan (3)

The Bangladesh cricket team toured the United Arab Emirates in late September 2022 to play two Twenty20 International (T20I) matches. The Bangladesh team was in Dubai to complete a training camp that had been interrupted by rain in Dhaka. The series was part of both teams' preparations for the 2022 ICC Men's T20 World Cup.

== Squads ==
T20Is
United Arab Emirates	Bangladesh
Chundangapoyil Rizwan (c); Vriitya Aravind (vc); Sabir Ali; Kashif Daud; Zawar Farid; Basil Hameed; Aayan Afzal Khan; Zahoor Khan; Aryan Lakra; Karthik Meiyappan; Ahmed Raza; Alishan Sharafu; Junaid Siddique; Chirag Suri; Muhammad Waseem	Nurul Hasan (c); Nasum Ahmed; Taskin Ahmed; Yasir Ali; Litton Das; Mehidy Hasan; Afif Hossain; Ebadot Hossain; Mosaddek Hossain; Rishad Hossain; Shoriful Islam; Hasan Mahmud; Mustafizur Rahman; Sabbir Rahman; Mohammad Saifuddin; Soumya Sarkar; Najmul Hossain Shanto

== T20I series ==
=== 1st T20I ===
25 September 2022
18:00 (D/N)
Scorecard

Bangladesh; 158/5 (20 overs)	v	United Arab Emirates; 151 (19.4 overs)
Afif Hossain 77* (55); Karthik Meiyappan 2/33 (4 overs)		Chirag Suri 39 (24); Mehidy Hasan 3/17 (3 overs)

Bangladesh won by 7 runs
Dubai International Cricket Stadium, Dubai
Umpires: Akbar Ali (UAE) and Shiju Sam (UAE)
Player of the match: Afif Hossain (Ban)

- United Arab Emirates won the toss and elected to field.
- Aayan Afzal Khan (UAE) made his T20I debut.

=== 2nd T20I ===
27 September 2022
18:00 (D/N)
Scorecard

Bangladesh; 169/5 (20 overs)	v	United Arab Emirates; 137/5 (20 overs)
Mehidy Hasan 46 (37); Aayan Afzal Khan 2/33 (4 overs)		Chundangapoyil Rizwan 51* (36); Mosaddek Hossain 2/8 (2 overs)

Bangladesh won by 32 runs
Dubai International Cricket Stadium, Dubai
Umpires: Akbar Ali (UAE) and Shiju Sam (UAE)
Player of the match: Mehidy Hasan (Ban)

- United Arab Emirates won the toss and elected to field.
