= Bangladeshi cricket team in New Zealand in 2020–21 =

International cricket tour

	New Zealand	Bangladesh
- Dates: 20 March – 1 April 2021
Captains	Tom Latham (ODIs); Tim Southee (T20Is)	Tamim Iqbal (ODIs); Mahmudullah (T20Is) (Note: Litton Das captained Bangladesh for the third T20I.)

One Day International series
- Results: New Zealand won the 3-match series 3–0
Most runs	Devon Conway (225)	Mahmudullah (119)
Most wickets	James Neesham (7)	Rubel Hossain (3); Mustafizur Rahman (3)
- Player of the series: Devon Conway (NZ)

Twenty20 International series
- Results: New Zealand won the 3-match series 3–0
Most runs	Devon Conway (107)	Mohammad Naim (84)
Most wickets	Tim Southee (6)	Mahedi Hasan (4)
- Player of the series: Glenn Phillips (NZ)

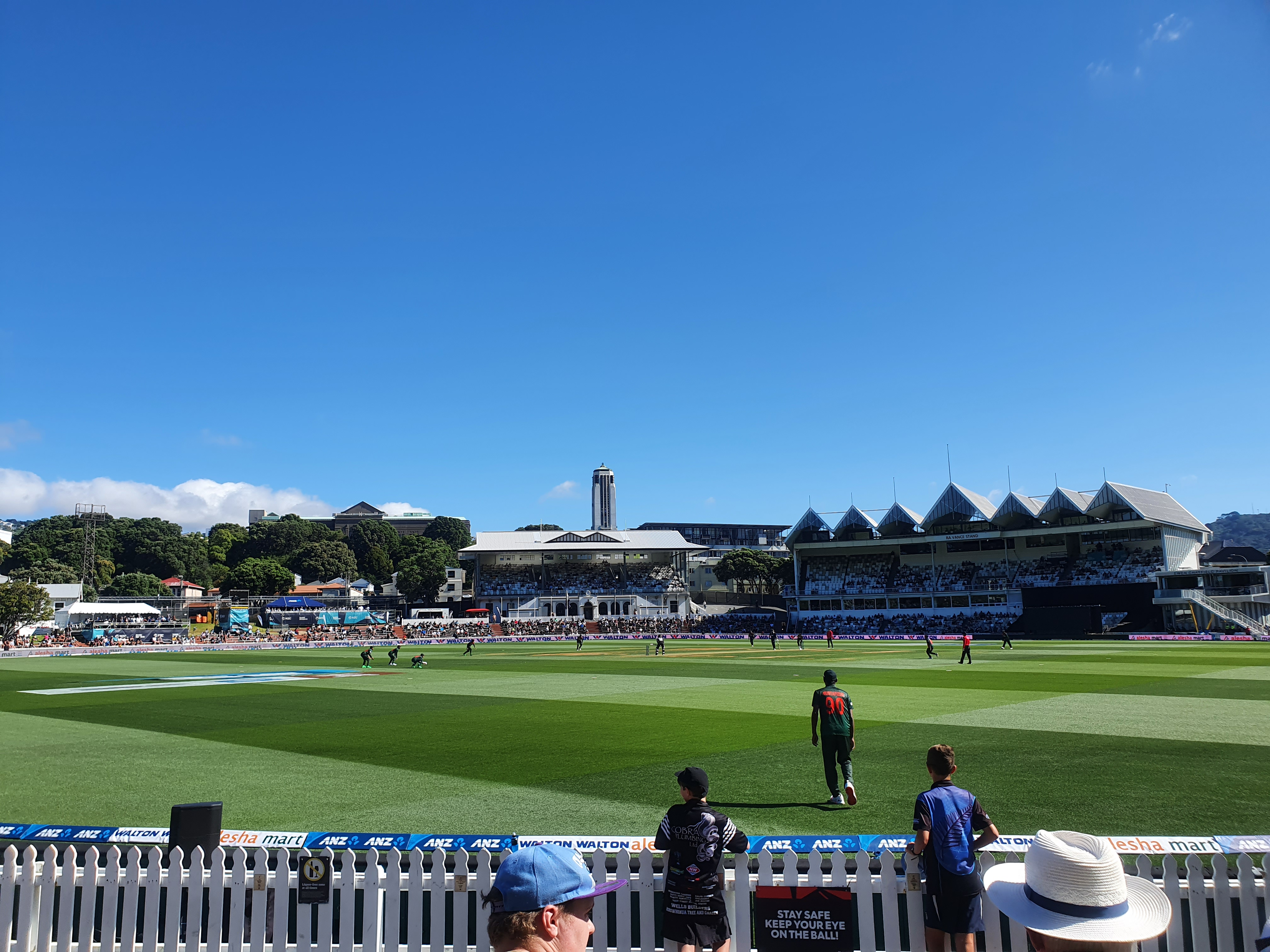
The third ODI at the Basin Reserve

The Bangladesh cricket team toured New Zealand in March and April 2021 to play three Twenty20 International (T20I) and three One Day International (ODI) matches. Originally, the tour was scheduled to take place in October 2020, ahead of the then scheduled ICC Men's T20 World Cup. In August 2020, New Zealand Cricket confirmed that the tour was going ahead, and were working with their government to comply with biosecurity during the COVID-19 pandemic. On 29 September 2020, New Zealand Cricket confirmed the schedule against Bangladesh. The ODI matches formed part of the inaugural 2020–2023 ICC Cricket World Cup Super League.

On 4 February 2021, the tour dates were pushed back by one week, to allow for enough preparation and the logistics for quarantine due to the COVID-19 pandemic. The T20I matches were played as double-headers alongside the women's fixtures between New Zealand and Australia.

Ahead of the tour, New Zealand's captain Kane Williamson was ruled out of the ODI matches due to an elbow injury, with Tom Latham named as captain in his place. New Zealand won the first two ODIs, with Latham scoring an unbeaten century in the second match, winning the series with a game to spare. New Zealand won the third and final ODI by 164 runs, to win the series 3–0. New Zealand won the first two T20I matches to win the series with a game to spare. New Zealand won the third T20I by 65 runs, to also win the series 3–0.

== Squads ==
ODIs		T20Is	
New Zealand	Bangladesh	New Zealand	Bangladesh
Tom Latham (c, wk); Trent Boult; Mark Chapman; Devon Conway; Martin Guptill; Matt Henry; Kyle Jamieson; Daryl Mitchell; James Neesham; Henry Nicholls; Mitchell Santner; Tim Southee; Ross Taylor; Will Young	Tamim Iqbal (c); Nasum Ahmed; Taskin Ahmed; Litton Das; Mahedi Hasan; Mehidy Hasan; Afif Hossain; Al-Amin Hossain; Mosaddek Hossain; Najmul Hossain Shanto; Rubel Hossain; Shoriful Islam; Mahmudullah; Mohammad Naim; Mushfiqur Rahim (wk); Hasan Mahmud; Mohammad Mithun; Mustafizur Rahman; Mohammad Saifuddin; Soumya Sarkar	Tim Southee (c); Finn Allen; Todd Astle; Hamish Bennett; Mark Chapman; Devon Conway (wk); Lockie Ferguson; Martin Guptill; Adam Milne; Daryl Mitchell; Glenn Phillips; Ish Sodhi; Will Young	Mahmudullah (c); Nasum Ahmed; Taskin Ahmed; Litton Das; Mahedi Hasan; Mehidy Hasan; Afif Hossain; Al-Amin Hossain; Mosaddek Hossain; Najmul Hossain Shanto; Rubel Hossain; ~~Tamim Iqbal~~; Shoriful Islam; Mohammad Naim; Mushfiqur Rahim (wk); ~~Hasan Mahmud~~; Mohammad Mithun; Mustafizur Rahman; Mohammad Saifuddin; Soumya Sarkar

Ross Taylor was ruled out of the first ODI and was replaced by Mark Chapman in New Zealand's squad. Bangladesh's Tamim Iqbal opted out of the T20I matches for personal reasons. Hasan Mahmud suffered an injury during the first ODI and was ruled out of Bangladesh's T20I squad.

== ODI series ==
=== 1st ODI ===
20 March 2021
11:00
Scorecard

Bangladesh; 131 (41.5 overs)	v	New Zealand; 132/2 (21.2 overs)
Mahmudullah 27 (54); Trent Boult 4/27 (8.5 overs)		Henry Nicholls 49* (53); Taskin Ahmed 1/23 (4 overs)

New Zealand won by 8 wickets
University of Otago Oval, Dunedin
Umpires: Chris Gaffaney (NZ) and Wayne Knights (NZ)
Player of the match: Trent Boult (NZ)

- New Zealand won the toss and elected to field.
- Devon Conway, Daryl Mitchell, Will Young (NZ) and Mahedi Hasan (Ban) all made their ODI debuts.
- Henry Nicholls (NZ) played in his 50th ODI.
- Tom Latham (NZ) played in his 100th ODI.
- World Cup Super League points: New Zealand 10, Bangladesh 0.

=== 2nd ODI ===
23 March 2021
14:00 (D/N)
Scorecard

Bangladesh; 271/6 (50 overs)	v	New Zealand; 275/5 (48.2 overs)
Tamim Iqbal 78 (108); Mitchell Santner 2/51 (10 overs)		Tom Latham 110* (108); Mahedi Hasan 2/42 (10 overs)

New Zealand won by 5 wickets
Hagley Oval, Christchurch
Umpires: Chris Brown (NZ) and Chris Gaffaney (NZ)
Player of the match: Tom Latham (NZ)

- New Zealand won the toss and elected to field.
- World Cup Super League points: New Zealand 10, Bangladesh 0.

=== 3rd ODI ===
26 March 2021
11:00
Scorecard

New Zealand; 318/6 (50 overs)	v	Bangladesh; 154 (42.4 overs)
Devon Conway 126 (110); Rubel Hossain 3/70 (10 overs)		Mahmudullah 76* (73); James Neesham 5/27 (7.4 overs)

New Zealand won by 164 runs
Basin Reserve, Wellington
Umpires: Chris Gaffaney (NZ) and Wayne Knights (NZ)
Player of the match: Devon Conway (NZ)

- New Zealand won the toss and elected to bat.
- Devon Conway and Daryl Mitchell (NZ) both scored their first centuries in ODIs.
- World Cup Super League points: New Zealand 10, Bangladesh 0.

== T20I series ==
=== 1st T20I ===
28 March 2021
14:00
Scorecard

New Zealand; 210/3 (20 overs)	v	Bangladesh; 144/8 (20 overs)
Devon Conway 92* (52); Nasum Ahmed 2/30 (4 overs)		Afif Hossain 45 (33); Ish Sodhi 4/28 (4 overs)

New Zealand won by 66 runs
Seddon Park, Hamilton
Umpires: Chris Gaffaney (NZ) and Shaun Haig (NZ)
Player of the match: Devon Conway (NZ)

- New Zealand won the toss and elected to bat.
- Finn Allen, Will Young (NZ), Nasum Ahmed and Shoriful Islam (Ban) all made their T20I debuts.
- Martin Guptill (NZ) played in his 100th T20I.

=== 2nd T20I ===
30 March 2021
19:00 (N)
Scorecard

New Zealand; 173/5 (17.5 overs)	v	Bangladesh; 142/7 (16 overs)
Glenn Phillips 58* (31); Mahedi Hasan 2/45 (4 overs)		Soumya Sarkar 51 (27); Tim Southee 2/21 (4 overs)

New Zealand won by 28 runs (DLS method)
McLean Park, Napier
Umpires: Chris Brown (NZ) and Wayne Knights (NZ)
Player of the match: Glenn Phillips (NZ)

- Bangladesh won the toss and elected to field.
- Bangladesh were set a revised target of 170 runs from 16 overs due to rain.

=== 3rd T20I ===
1 April 2021
19:00 (N)
Scorecard

New Zealand; 141/4 (10 overs)	v	Bangladesh; 76 (9.3 overs)
Finn Allen 71 (29); Shoriful Islam 1/21 (2 overs)		Mohammad Naim 19 (13); Todd Astle 4/13 (2 overs)

New Zealand won by 65 runs
Eden Park, Auckland
Umpires: Chris Brown (NZ) and Chris Gaffaney (NZ)
Player of the match: Finn Allen (NZ)

- Bangladesh won the toss and elected to field.
- The match was reduced to 10 overs per side due to rain.
