= Daryl Mitchell (New Zealand cricketer) =

New Zealand cricketer (born 1991)

Personal information
- Full name: Daryl Joseph Mitchell
- Born: 20 May 1991 (age 35); Hamilton, New Zealand
- Batting: Right-handed
- Bowling: Right-arm medium
- Role: Batting all-rounder
- Relatives: John Mitchell (father); Paul Mitchell (uncle)

International information
- National side: New Zealand (2019–present)
- Test debut (cap 276): 29 November 2019 v England
- Last Test: 25 June 2026 v England
- ODI debut (cap 199): 20 March 2021 v Bangladesh
- Last ODI: 10 November 2026 v India
- ODI shirt no.: 75
- T20I debut (cap 81): 6 February 2019 v India
- Last T20I: 1 November 2026 v India
- T20I shirt no.: 75

Domestic team information
- Years: Team
- 2011/12–2019/20: Northern Districts
- 2020/21–present: Canterbury
- 2021: Middlesex
- 2022: Rajasthan Royals
- 2023: Lancashire
- 2023: London Spirit
- 2024: Chennai Super Kings
- 2025: Lahore Qalandars
- 2025: Texas Super Kings
- 2026: Rawalpindiz
- 2026: Dublin Guardians

Career statistics
Competition	Test	ODI	T20I	FC
Matches	39	65	109	120
Runs scored	2,411	2,894	2,055	6,797
Batting average	43.05	56.74	27.77	39.28
100s/50s	6/16	9/14	0/9	16/39
Top score	190	137	72*	190
Balls bowled	805	339	115	5,911
Wickets	4	14	9	101
Bowling average	102.50	23.92	23.55	31.10
5 wickets in innings	0	0	0	1
10 wickets in match	0	0	0	0
Best bowling	1/7	3/25	2/27	5/44
Catches/stumpings	62/–	41/–	60/–	147/–
Medal record
Men's Cricket
Representing New Zealand
ICC T20 World Cup
Runner-up	2026 India & Sri Lanka
Runner-up	2021 UAE & Oman
ICC Champions Trophy
Runner-up	2025 Pakistan
- Source: ESPNcricinfo, 10 November 2026

Daryl Joseph Mitchell (born 20 May 1991) is a New Zealand professional cricketer who plays as a right handed batter and right-arm medium bowler for the New Zealand national team and Canterbury. As of June 2026, he is signed with Rawalpindiz in the Pakistan Super League. Having begun his domestic career in 2011 with Northern Districts he made his international debut in 2019, and has since then represented several teams across limited-overs leagues around the world.

Outside of cricket, he was a fitness coach at the Waikato Rugby Union. His father, John, is a rugby union coach and former player.

== Early life ==
He was still pursuing his bachelor's degree in exercise and sports science when he turned up at Northern Districts in 2012 at the age of 20. He lived in Perth, Western Australia for five of his formative years and he even shared the field with some of the Australian cricketers including the likes of Andrew Tye, Marcus Harris and Marcus Stoinis especially through the school and grade ranks in Western Australia. In March 2009, Daryl Mitchell, Marcus Stoinis and Justin Langer sat together as team-mates in the changerooms at the WACA celebrating a first-grade premiership for Scarborough. During his three years with Hale in school cricket and two years with Scarborough at club cricket, Mitchell also played for the Western Australia Under 19s, Under 23s and for the Australian Centre of Excellence, which was part of a Futures League T20 competition. Following his impressive showing in Australian third grade level competitions, he received a contract from Northern Districts which he gladly accepted and since became a regular in New Zealand domestic circuit. As a teenager, he and his family moved to Western Australia in 2006 when his father John, got the position of head coach of the Western Force rugby union team.

== Domestic career ==
In June 2018, he was awarded a contract with Northern Districts for the 2018–19 season.

In June 2020, Mitchell moved from Northern Districts to Canterbury. In November 2020, in the fourth round of the 2020–21 Plunket Shield season, Mitchell took his first five-wicket haul in first-class cricket, with 5/44 against Otago.

In May 2021, Mitchell was awarded with his first central contract by New Zealand Cricket, ahead of the 2021–22 season. That month, he was also signed by Middlesex for the latter part of the 2021 t20 Blast.

In February 2022, he was bought by the Rajasthan Royals in the auction for the 2022 Indian Premier League tournament.

In January 2023 Lancashire announced that Mitchell would be playing for the county in both the County Championship and T20 Blast in the 2022–23 season.

On 11 February 2026, the Rawalpindi franchise signed Mitchell for PKR 8.00 crore, making him the costliest overseas signing of the first-ever Pakistan Super League auction.

== International career ==
In January 2019, he was named in New Zealand's Twenty20 International (T20I) squad for their series against India. He made his T20I debut for New Zealand against India on 6 February 2019. In November 2019, he was added to New Zealand's Test squad for the second Test against England. He made his Test debut for New Zealand, against England, on 29 November 2019.

In January 2021, in the second Test against Pakistan, Mitchell scored his first century in Test cricket, with an unbeaten 102 runs. In March 2021, Mitchell was named in New Zealand's One Day International (ODI) squad for their series against Bangladesh. He made his ODI debut for New Zealand on 20 March 2021, against Bangladesh. On 26 March 2021, Mitchell scored his first century in ODI cricket, in the third match of the series against Bangladesh.

=== 2021 ICC T20 World Cup ===
In August 2021, Mitchell was named in New Zealand's squad for the 2021 ICC Men's T20 World Cup.

He opened the batting alongside Martin Guptill during the entirety of the 2021 ICC Men's T20 World Cup although a role he had never done before. He had played in 116 T20 matches prior to the 2021 ICC T20 World Cup where he had never opened the batting in any of those matches. He was promoted to open the innings during the 2021 edition of the T20 World Cup by the then head coach Gary Stead. Prior to the 2021 T20 World Cup, New Zealand coaching staff and management intended to give Mitchell the finishing role in the middle order along with Jimmy Neesham. However, the plans had to be changed later, courtesy of late arrival of first choice opener Tim Seifert who joined the bio-secure bubble pity late due to the latter's involvement with the Kolkata Knight Riders franchise during the 2021 Indian Premier League and as a result, Daryl Mitchell went onto become an accidental opener of New Zealand cricket.

In the team's semi-final against England, he opened the batting and scored 72 not out, with New Zealand winning the match by five wickets; Mitchell was awarded the player of the match. He ended the 2021 T20 World Cup campaign on a higher note having notched up impressive returns with the bat as an opener in his first ever experience of having opened the batting in a tournament, scoring 208 runs in seven innings, averaging 34.66 with the bat and with a strike rate of 140.54. His batting prowess was also one of the crucial reasons which helped New Zealand to reach the 2021 T20 World Cup final.

=== 2022 England test tour ===
Mitchell maintained a highly successful test tour to England in July 2022 where he piled up a mammoth runfest aggregating a record 538 runs with a stellar average of 107.60 in the three match test series although New Zealand ended the test tour on a receiving end after being whitewashed by the home team 3–0. Mitchell turned out to be one of the only two bright sparks alongside Tom Blundell for the Kiwis during the one sided test series where he scored three centuries in three successive test matches and he went past Martin Donnelly's tally of 462 runs to become the most prolific New Zealand player to have ever scored the most runs in a single test series on English soil against England. He also became the first New Zealand batsman to score centuries in three consecutive test matches in England and became only the sixth visiting batsman to score centuries in three successive test match appearances in England. He also became the first batter in the world to score hundreds in each match of an away series of three or more tests. During the test series, he along with wicket-keeper batsman Tom Blundell set a new record for New Zealand for being the most successful New Zealand pair in a test series with an aggregate of 611 partnership runs. His tally of 538 runs in the three-match test series also set a new record for most runs among New Zealand batsmen in a test series. Prior to the England test series in July 2022, Mitchell had not played a red ball first-class match in four months and was not in contention for a test spot for the England tour but was included for the first test match of the series at Lord's later as a replacement to Henry Nicholls whose positive COVID-19 test had played a part in delaying his rehabilitation from a calf injury.

=== 2022 ICC T20 World Cup ===
In September 2022, Mitchell was named in New Zealand's squad for the 2022 ICC Men's T20 World Cup.

=== 2023 Cricket World Cup ===
In September 2023, he was included in New Zealand's 15-member squad for the 50-over World Cup in India. He played a remarkable role in the 2023 Cricket World Cup and almost won the match for New Zealand in the semi final against India by scoring a wonderful 134 off 119 balls.

=== 2024 ICC T20 World Cup ===
In May 2024, he was named in New Zealand's squad for the 2024 ICC Men's T20 World Cup tournament.

=== 2025–present ===
On 19 November 2025, he overtook Rohit Sharma to become the world No. 1 batter in the ICC Men's ODI Rankings. He became the second Kiwi ever to claim the top ranking, 46 years after Glenn Turner in 1979. He continued his strong form in New Zealand's 2026 ODI series against India, hitting 352 runs, including two consecutive centuries in the second and third matches, and was named the player of the series. New Zealand won the series 2–1, their first ODI series in India.

== List of International Cricket Centuries ==
Daryl Mitchell has scored 15 international centuries - 6 in Test Cricket , and 9 in One Day Internationals.

=== Test Cricket Centuries ===
No.	Runs	Balls	Against	Pos.	Inn.	Venue	H/A	Date	Result
1	102*	112	Pakistan	7	2	Hagley Oval, Christchurch	Home	Jan 3–6, 2021	Won
2	108	203	England	5	3	Lord's, London	Away	Jun 2–6, 2022	Lost
3	190	318	England	5	1	Trent Bridge, West Bridgford	Away	Jun 10–14, 2022	Lost
4	109	228	England	6	1	Headingley Cricket Ground, Leeds	Away	Jun 23–27, 2022	Lost
5	102	193	Sri Lanka	5	2	Hagley Oval, Christchurch	Home	Mar 9–13, 2023	Won
6	100*	241	England	5	3	Trent Bridge, West Bridgford	Away	Jun 25–29, 2026	Won

=== One Day International Centuries ===
No.	Runs	Balls Faced	Against	Pos.	Inn.	S/R	Venue	H/A/N	Date	Result
1	100*	92	Bangladesh	6	1	108.70	Basin Reserve,Wellington	Home	26 Mar 2021	Won
2	113	115	Pakistan	3	1	98.26	Rawalpindi Cricket Stadium,Rawalpindi	Away	27 Apr 2023	Lost
3	129	119	Pakistan	3	1	108.40	Rawalpindi Cricket Stadium,Rawalpindi	Away	29 Apr 2023	Lost
4	118*	91	England	4	2	129.67	Sophia Gardens,Cardiff	Away	8 Sep 2023	Won
5	130	127	India	4	1	102.36	HPCA Stadium,Dharamshala	Away	22 Oct 2023	Lost
6	134	119	India	4	2	112.61	Wankhede Stadium,Mumbai	Away	15 Nov 2023	Lost
7	119	118	West Indies	4	1	100.85	Hagley Oval,Christchurch	Home	16 Nov 2025	Won
8	131*	117	India	4	2	111.97	Saurashtra Cricket Association Stadium	Away	14 Jan 2026	Won
9	137	131	India	4	1	104.58	Holkar Stadium,Indore	Away	18 Jan 2026	Won

== Rugby ==
He also worked as an assistant strength and conditioning coach at Waikato Rugby from 2018 to 2020. He also played rugby at school level during off seasons especially at winter seasons.

== Honours ==
He was named as the winner of the ICC Spirit of the Cricket Award 2021 during the 2021 ICC Awards in recognition of his act for his decision on not to run for a single after realising that he had obstructed English bowler Adil Rashid on his way during the critical juncture of the closely fought tense semi-final clash between England and New Zealand at Abu Dhabi.

He was nominated for the ICC Player of the Month along with Jonny Bairstow and Joe Root for the month of June 2022.
