= Aayan Afzal Khan =

Emirati cricketer (born 2005)

Personal information
- Full name: Aayan Afzal Khan
- Born: 15 November 2005 (age 20); Goa, India
- Batting: Right-handed
- Bowling: Slow left-arm orthodox
- Role: Bowling allrounder

International information
- National side: United Arab Emirates
- ODI debut (cap 95): 14 November 2022 v Nepal
- Last ODI: 9 November 2024 v Netherlands
- T20I debut (cap 61): 25 September 2022 v Bangladesh
- Last T20I: 4 October 2024 v USA

Career statistics
Competition	ODI	T20I	LA	T20
Matches	34	36	34	54
Runs scored	585	165	585	219
Batting average	24.37	12.69	24.37	13.68
100s/50s	0/3	0/0	0/3	0/0
Top score	94*	42	94*	42
Balls bowled	1788	758	1788	961
Wickets	43	37	43	53
Bowling average	27.44	20.35	27.44	18.35
5 wickets in innings	0	0	0	0
10 wickets in match	0	0	0	0
Best bowling	4/14	3/7	4/14	4/16
Catches/stumpings	2/–	6/–	2/–	10/–
- Source: ESPNcricinfo, 15 March 2025

Aayan Afzal Khan (born 15 November 2005) is an Indian-born cricketer who plays for the United Arab Emirates national cricket team. In September 2022, he was named in the UAE T20I squad for their series against Bangladesh. He made his T20I debut on 25 September 2022, against Bangladesh, scoring 25 runs and claiming a wicket. Later the same month, he was named in the United Arab Emirates squad for the 2022 ICC Men's T20 World Cup. In November 2022, he was named in the United Arab Emirates' One Day International (ODI) squad for their series against Nepal. He made his ODI debut on 14 November 2022, against Nepal.

== Personal life ==
Aayan was born in Goa, India, the son of Afzal and Shahista Khan. He has a younger sister. He soon moved to the UAE with his family, growing up in Sharjah. He attended Our Own English High School in Sharjah.
