= Mahedi Hasan =

Bangladeshi cricketer (born 1994)

Personal information
- Born: 12 December 1994 (age 31); Khulna, Bangladesh
- Height: 167 cm (5 ft 6 in)
- Batting: Right-handed
- Bowling: Right-arm off-break
- Role: All-rounder

International information
- National side: Bangladesh (2018-present)
- ODI debut (cap 135): 20 March 2021 v New Zealand
- Last ODI: 14 June 2026 v Australia
- T20I debut (cap 63): 18 February 2018 v Sri Lanka
- Last T20I: 17 June 2026 v Australia

Domestic team information
- Years: Team
- 2015-present: Khulna Division
- 2016: Barisal Bulls
- 2017: Comilla Victorians
- 2018–present: Gazi Group Cricketers
- 2019: Dhaka Platoon
- 2022: Khulna Tigers
- 2023-2025: Rangpur Riders
- 2026-present: Chattogram Royals

Career statistics
Competition	ODI	T20I	FC	LA
Matches	12	76	57	152
Runs scored	125	486	2,788	2,250
Batting average	13.88	13.13	36.68	21.42
100s/50s	0/0	0/0	6/14	1/5
Top score	29*	33	177	103
Balls bowled	588	1,595	8,466	7,474
Wickets	15	75	153	180
Bowling average	31.53	24.16	27.10	28.85
5 wickets in innings	0	0	9	0
10 wickets in match	0	0	3	0
Best bowling	4/71	4/11	8/10	4/16
Catches/stumpings	4/–	26/–	44/–	60/–
Medal record
Men's Cricket
Representing Bangladesh
South Asian Games
Gold medal – first place	2019 Kathmandu/Pokhara	Team
- Source: Cricinfo, 1 September 2026

Mahedi Hasan (born 12 December 1994) is a Bangladeshi cricketer who plays for Khulna Division and the Bangladesh cricket team. He made his international debut for Bangladesh in February 2018.

== Domestic career ==
Mahedi made his Twenty20 (T20) debut on 8 November 2016, playing for Barisal Bulls in the 2016–17 Bangladesh Premier League.

In October 2018, Mahedi was named in the Comilla Victorians squad, following the draft for the 2018–19 Bangladesh Premier League. In November 2018, while bowling for South Zone in the 2018–19 Bangladesh Cricket League, he took his maiden five-wicket haul in first-class cricket. In August 2019, he was one of 35 cricketers named in a training camp ahead of Bangladesh's 2019–20 season. In November 2019, he was selected to play for the Dhaka Platoon in the 2019–20 Bangladesh Premier League.

== International career ==
=== 2018-2019 ===
In February 2018, Mahedi was named in Bangladesh's Twenty20 International (T20I) squad for their series against Sri Lanka. He made his T20I debut against Sri Lanka on 18 February 2018. He was again added to the squad for first two T20Is in the 2019–20 Bangladesh Tri-Nation Series, but did not play and was dropped from the next two T20Is. In November 2019, he was named in Bangladesh's squad for the 2019 ACC Emerging Teams Asia Cup in Bangladesh. Later the same month, he was named in Bangladesh's squad for the men's cricket tournament at the 2019 South Asian Games. The Bangladesh team won the gold medal, after they beat Sri Lanka by seven wickets in the final.

=== 2021-2022 ===
In January 2021, Mahedi was named in Bangladesh's One Day International (ODI) squad for their series against the West Indies. The following month, he was named in Bangladesh's squad for their series against New Zealand. He made his ODI debut on 20 March 2021, against New Zealand.

In September 2021, he was named in Bangladesh's squad for the 2021 ICC Men's T20 World Cup. In the world cup he picked up 8 wickets in 7 innings in an average of 18.75. His best bowling figure was 3/19. He also scored 53 runs in 6 innings in an average of 13.25 and at the strike rate of 110.41. His highest individual score was 27.

=== 2023-2024 ===
In May 2024, he was named in Bangladesh's squad for the 2024 ICC Men's T20 World Cup tournament.

=== 2025-present ===
On 22 August 2025, he was named in the Bangladesh Squad for Asia Cup 2025 & T20I Series Against the Netherlands.

== See also ==
- List of Khulna Division cricketers
