= Afif Hossain =

Bangladeshi cricketer (born 1999)

Personal information
- Full name: Afif Hossain Dhrubo
- Born: 22 September 1999 (age 27); Khulna, Bangladesh
- Nickname: Dhrubo
- Height: 177 cm (5 ft 10 in)
- Batting: Left-handed
- Bowling: Right-arm off break
- Role: All-rounder

International information
- National side: Bangladesh (2018–present)
- ODI debut (cap 132): 6 March 2020 v Zimbabwe
- Last ODI: 17 April 2026 v New Zealand
- ODI shirt no.: 18
- T20I debut (cap 58): 15 February 2018 v Sri Lanka
- Last T20I: 15 December 2024 v West Indies
- T20I shirt no.: 88

Domestic team information
- Years: Team
- 2017: Khulna Division
- 2016: Rajshahi Kings
- 2017: Khulna Titans
- 2019: Sylhet Sixers
- 2019–2020: Rajshahi Royals
- 2022: Jaffna Kings
- 2023: Chattogram Challengers
- 2024-2025: Khulna Tigers

Career statistics
| Competition | ODI | T20I |
|---|---|---|
| Matches | 34 | 70 |
| Runs scored | 667 | 1,117 |
| Batting average | 27.79 | 20.30 |
| 100s/50s | 0/3 | 0/3 |
| Top score | 93* | 77* |
| Balls bowled | 124 | 204 |
| Wickets | 4 | 12 |
| Bowling average | 30.50 | 21.66 |
| 5 wickets in innings | 0 | 0 |
| 10 wickets in match | 0 | 0 |
| Best bowling | 1/0 | 3/11 |
| Catches/stumpings | 12/– | 19/– |
Medal record
Men's cricket
Representing Bangladesh
Asian Games
| Bronze medal – third place | 2022 Hangzhou | Team |
South Asian Games
| Gold medal – first place | 2019 Kathmandu/Pokhara | Team |
- Source: ESPN Cricinfo, 5 November 2025

Afif Hossain Dhrubo (Bengali: আফিফ হোসেন ধ্রুব; born 22 September 1999) is a Bangladeshi cricketer. In February 2018, he was named in Bangladesh's Twenty20 International (T20I) squad for their series against Sri Lanka. He made his T20I debut for Bangladesh against Sri Lanka on 15 February 2018.

== Early life ==
Afif was a student of the Bangladesh Krira Shikkha Protishtan, Bangladesh's biggest sports institute, that has also produced the likes of Shakib Al Hasan, Mushfiqur Rahim, Nasir Hossain, etc. He was known as a big-hitter at the U-19 level, and coaches found him similar to Tamim Iqbal.

== Domestic career ==
At 17 years and 72 days, Afif became the youngest bowler to take a T20 five-wicket haul on his debut on 3 December 2016 for Rajshahi Kings in the BPL 2016. Playing in the closing stages of the league phase, he ran through Chittagong Vikings with his 5 for 21, including the wicket of Chris Gayle.

Afif made his first-class debut for East Zone in the 2016–17 Bangladesh Cricket League on 11 February 2017. Opening the batting, he scored 105 in the first innings and was named player of the match.

On 5 June 2017, in the 2016–17 Dhaka Premier Division Cricket League, Afif took a hat-trick playing for Abahani Limited.

In October 2018, Afif was named in the squad for the Sylhet Sixers team, following the draft for the 2018–19 Bangladesh Premier League. In August 2019, he was one of 35 cricketers named in a training camp ahead of Bangladesh's 2019–20 season. In November 2019, he was selected to play for the Rajshahi Royals in the 2019–20 Bangladesh Premier League.

== Under-19 career ==
Afif was the vice-captain of the Bangladesh U-19 side for the 2016 Asia Cup. In December 2017, he was named in Bangladesh's squad for the 2018 Under-19 Cricket World Cup. He was the leading run-scorer for Bangladesh in the tournament, with 276 runs. Following Bangladesh's matches in the tournament, the International Cricket Council (ICC) named Afif as the rising star of the squad.

In December 2018, Afif was named in Bangladesh's team for the 2018 ACC Emerging Teams Asia Cup.

== International career ==
Afif made his international debut in 2018 against Sri Lanka in the first T20I but his second-ball duck with the bat and 1/26 in 2 overs with the ball saw him dropped from the team in the next match. He was included in the squad for 2019–20 Bangladesh Tri-Nation Series, and in the first match against Zimbabwe, while Bangladesh was on the verge of defeat losing 6 wicket for 60 runs and still needing 85 runs to win, he came to bat at no. 8 and scored a blistering knock of 52 off 26 balls and made a crucial 82-run stand with Mosaddek Hossain to overcome the target. Subsequently, he was selected for Man of Match award for his knock.

In November 2019, Afif was named in Bangladesh's squad for the 2019 ACC Emerging Teams Asia Cup in Bangladesh. Later the same month, he was named in Bangladesh's squad for the cricket tournament at the 2019 South Asian Games. The Bangladesh team won the gold medal, after they beat Sri Lanka by seven wickets in the final.

In February 2020, Afif was named in Bangladesh's One Day International (ODI) squad for their series against Zimbabwe. He made his ODI debut for Bangladesh, against Zimbabwe, on 6 March 2020. In September 2021, he was named in Bangladesh's squad for the 2021 ICC Men's T20 World Cup.

In February 2022, he scored 93* and helped Bangladesh to get a famous win against Afghanistan in Chattogram, which is the highest individual score for any Bangladeshi batter in ODI cricket while batting at number 7 and lower.

In August 2022, Afif scored 85 runs in 81 balls in the last ODI against Zimbabwe to prevent a whitewash. Bangladesh were able to get to a score of 256/9, and Bangladesh won. He won the "Man of the Match" Award for his efforts.

In May 2024, he was named as a reserve player in Bangladesh's squad for the 2024 ICC Men's T20 World Cup tournament.
