= Nasum Ahmed =

Bangladeshi cricketer

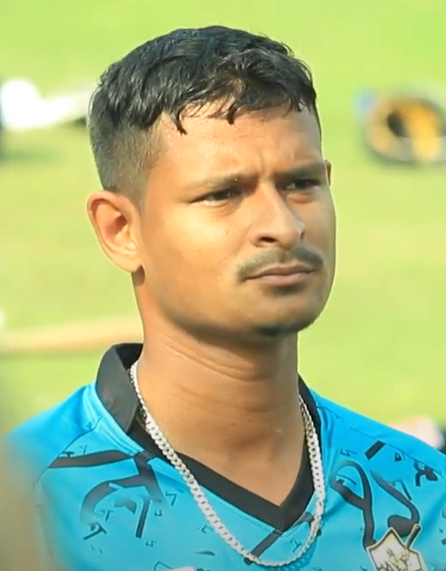

Personal information
- Born: 5 December 1994 (age 31); Sylhet, Bangladesh
- Height: 6 ft (183 cm)
- Batting: Left-handed
- Bowling: Left-arm orthodox spin
- Role: Bowler

International information
- National side: Bangladesh (2021– present)
- ODI debut (cap 138): 10 July 2022 v West Indies
- Last ODI: 23 October 2025 v West Indies
- T20I debut (cap 69): 28 March 2021 v New Zealand
- Last T20I: 19 June 2026 v Australia

Career statistics
Competition	ODI	T20I	FC	LA
Matches	20	50	39	128
Runs scored	201	115	1,026	901
Batting average	18.27	8.84	21.37	12.01
100s/50s	0/0	0/0	0/5	0/1
Top score	44	20	85	67
Balls bowled	976	975	8720	6542
Wickets	21	51	161	167
Bowling average	33.66	22.58	27.69	28.77
5 wickets in innings	0	0	11	2
10 wickets in match	–	–	2	–
Best bowling	3/11	4/10	7/43	5/22
Catches/stumpings	4/–	8/–	14/–	29/–
- Source: Cricinfo, 20 June 2026

Nasum Ahmed (Bengali: নাসুম আহমেদ; born 5 December 1994) is a Bangladeshi cricketer who plays for Sylhet Division in domestic cricket. He made his international debut for the Bangladesh cricket team in March 2021.

== Early life and family ==
Nasum Ahmed was born on 5 December 1994 to Bengali Muslim parents in Jalalabad, Sylhet. His grandfather migrated to Sylhet in 1958 from their ancestral home, which is in the village of Mardapur in Derai, Sunamganj District.

== Domestic career ==
In November 2019, Nasum was selected to play for the Chattogram Challengers in the 2019–20 Bangladesh Premier League.

== International career ==
=== 2020-2021 ===
In March 2020, Nasum was named in Bangladesh's Twenty20 International (T20I) squad for their series against Zimbabwe. In January 2021, he was one of four uncapped players to be named in a preliminary squad for the One Day International (ODI) series against the West Indies. In February 2021, he was named in Bangladesh's squad for their series against New Zealand. He made his T20I debut on 28 March 2021, against New Zealand.

On 3 August 2021, in a T20 match against Australia, Nasum took 4 wickets for 19 runs, helping Bangladesh to win against Australia in T20 for the first time.

On 8 September 2021, in a T20 match against New Zealand, Nasum took four wickets, giving away 10 runs, helping Bangladesh to win a T20 series against New Zealand for the first time. He was also named as the man of the match. Later the same month, he was named in Bangladesh's squad for the 2021 ICC Men's T20 World Cup.

=== 2022-2023 ===
In February 2022, he was named in Bangladesh's One Day International (ODI) squad for their series against Afghanistan. In March 2022, he was named in Bangladesh's ODI squad for their series against South Africa. In May 2022, he was again named in Bangladesh's ODI squad, this time for their series against the West Indies. He made his ODI debut on 10 July 2022, against the West Indies.

=== 2025-2026 ===
In January 2025, he was named in Bangladesh's squad for the 2025 ICC Champions Trophy.
