= Shoriful Islam =

Bangladeshi cricketer

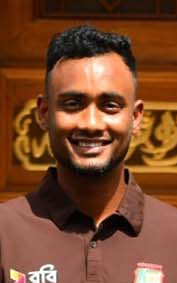
- Islam in 2024

Personal information
- Full name: Mohammad Shoriful Islam
- Born: 3 June 2001 (age 25); Panchagarh, Bangladesh
- Height: 6 ft 3 in (191 cm)
- Batting: Left-handed
- Bowling: Left-arm medium fast
- Role: Bowler
- Relatives: Fardin Sheikh Chandni (wife)

International information
- National side: Bangladesh (2021-present)
- Test debut (cap 97): 29 April 2021 v Sri Lanka
- Last Test: 22 November 2024 v West Indies
- ODI debut (cap 136): 25 May 2021 v Sri Lanka
- Last ODI: 23 April 2026 v New Zealand
- ODI shirt no.: 47
- T20I debut (cap 70): 28 March 2021 v New Zealand
- Last T20I: 2 May 2026 v New Zealand
- T20I shirt no.: 47

Career statistics
Competition	Test	ODI	T20I	FC
Matches	13	44	61	25
Runs scored	168	102	91	239
Batting average	10.50	6.80	5.68	9.56
100s/50s	0/0	0/0	0/0	0/0
Top score	26	16	16*	26
Balls bowled	1,884	2,064	1,202	3,354
Wickets	27	69	67	59
Bowling average	36.03	26.56	24.22	29.11
5 wickets in innings	1	1	0	0
10 wickets in match	0	0	0	0
Best bowling	7/48	6/48	3/17	4/33
Catches/stumpings	7/–	5/–	11/–	10/–
Medal record
Men's Cricket
Representing Bangladesh
ICC U-19 World Cup
Winner	2020 South Africa
- Source: ESPNcricinfo, 16 June 2026

Mohammad Shoriful Islam (Bangla: মোহাম্মদ শরিফুল ইসলাম; born 3 June 2001) is a Bangladeshi cricketer. He made his international debut for the Bangladesh cricket team in March 2021.

== Domestic and under-19 career ==
Shoriful made his first-class debut for Rajshahi Division in the 2017–18 National Cricket League on 15 September 2017. He made his List A debut for Prime Bank Cricket Club in the 2017–18 Dhaka Premier Division Cricket League on 7 February 2018.

Shoriful was the joint-leading wicket-taker for Prime Bank Cricket Club in the 2017–18 Dhaka Premier Division Cricket League, with 17 dismissals in 8 matches.

Shoriful made his Twenty20 debut for Bangladesh A against Ireland A on 13 August 2018. The next day, he was one of twelve debutants to be selected for a 31-man preliminary squad for Bangladesh ahead of the 2018 Asia Cup.

In October 2018, Shoriful was named in the squad for the Khulna Titans team, following the draft for the 2018–19 Bangladesh Premier League. In December 2018, he was named in Bangladesh's team for the 2018 ACC Emerging Teams Asia Cup. In December 2019, he was named in Bangladesh's squad for the 2020 Under-19 Cricket World Cup.

In July 2024, he was selected to play for Kandy Falcons in the 2024 Lanka Premier League.

== International career ==
In January 2021, Shoriful was one of four uncapped players to be named in a preliminary squad for the One Day International (ODI) series against the West Indies. Later the same month, he was named in Bangladesh's ODI squad for their matches against the West Indies. The following month, he was named in Bangladesh's squad for their series against New Zealand. He made his T20I debut on 28 March 2021, against New Zealand.

In April 2021, Shoriful was named in Bangladesh's preliminary Test squad for their series against Sri Lanka, before being named in the final 15-man squad for the first Test. He made his Test debut on 29 April 2021, for Bangladesh against Sri Lanka. In May 2021, he was named in Bangladesh's ODI squad for their series against Sri Lanka. He made his ODI debut for Bangladesh on 25 May 2021, against Sri Lanka.

In September 2021, he was named in Bangladesh's squad for the 2021 ICC Men's T20 World Cup. In September 2022, he was named in Bangladesh' squad for the 2022 ICC Men's T20 World Cup.

In September 2023, he was named in Bangladesh's squad for the 2023 Cricket World Cup. On 23 December 2023, during the third ODI against New Zealand, he became the third fastest bowler for Bangladesh, in terms of matches (32), to take 50 wickets in ODIs.

In May 2024, he was named in Bangladesh's squad for the 2024 ICC Men's T20 World Cup tournament.
