= Mosaddek Hossain =

Bangladeshi cricketer (born 1995)

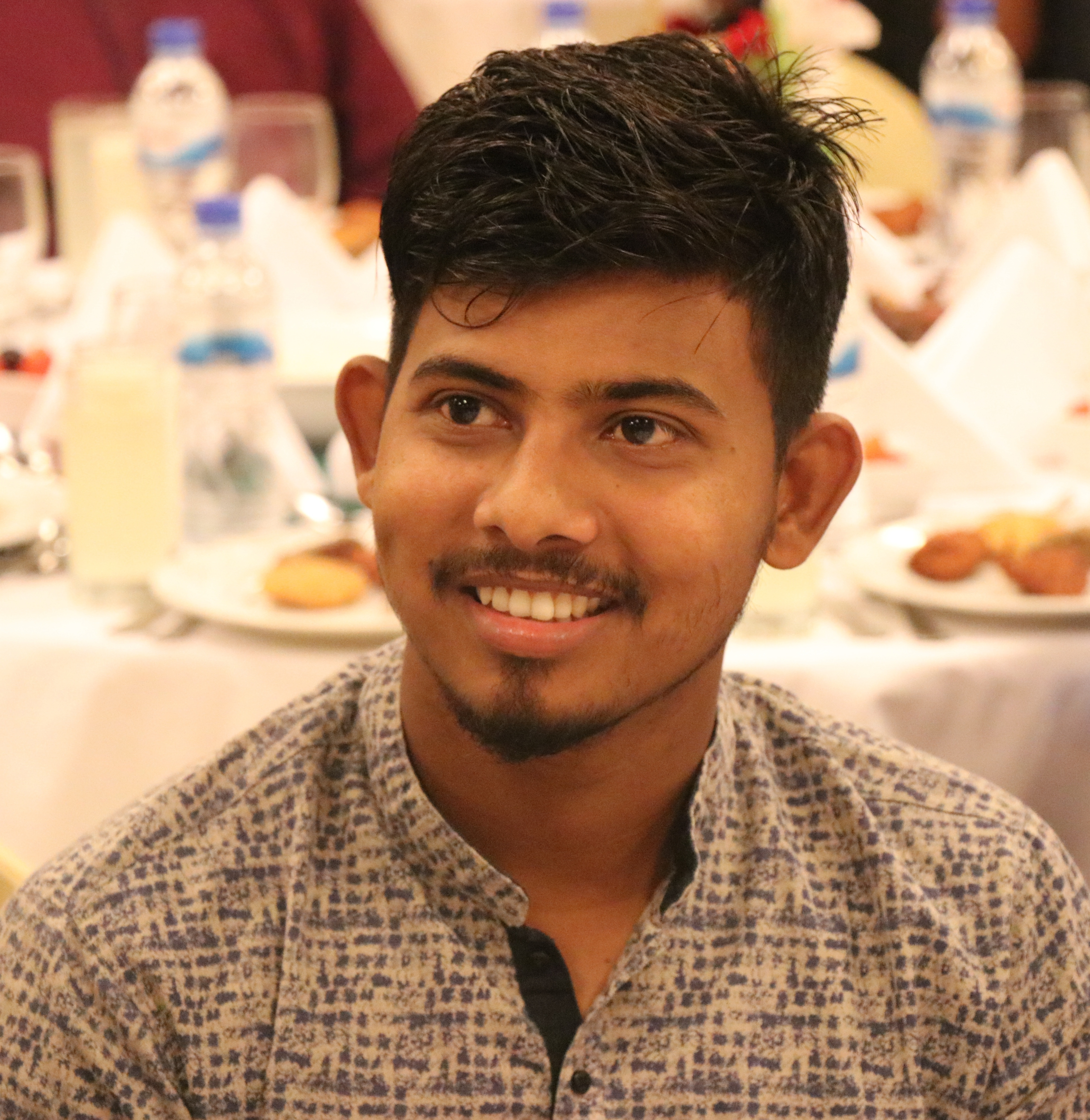
- Mosaddek in 2018

Personal information
- Full name: Mosaddek Hossain Saikat
- Born: 10 December 1995 (age 30); Mymensingh, Bangladesh
- Nickname: Saikat
- Height: 1.74 m (5 ft 9 in)
- Batting: Right-handed
- Bowling: Right-arm off break
- Role: Middle-order batsman

International information
- National side: Bangladesh (2016–present)
- Test debut (cap 86): 15 March 2017 v Sri Lanka
- Last Test: 23 May 2022 v Sri Lanka
- ODI debut (cap 119): 28 September 2016 v Afghanistan
- Last ODI: 14 June 2026 v Australia
- ODI shirt no.: 32
- T20I debut (cap 53): 20 January 2016 v Zimbabwe
- Last T20I: 6 November 2022 v Pakistan
- T20I shirt no.: 32

Domestic team information
- Years: Team
- 2013/14: Dhaka Division
- 2013/14–present: Abahani Limited
- 2014/15–present: Barisal Division
- 2015/17: Dhaka Dynamites
- 2019–present: Chittagong Vikings

Career statistics
Competition	Test	ODI	T20I	FC
Matches	4	46	33	50
Runs scored	173	791	389	3429
Batting average	28.83	30.42	18.52	47.62
100s/50s	0/1	0/5	0/0	11/14
Top score	75	86*	48*	282
Balls bowled	162	1238	331	3124
Wickets	0	19	18	33
Bowling average	–	55.15	22.11	51.18
5 wickets in innings	0	0	1	0
10 wickets in match	0	–	–	0
Best bowling	–	3/13	5/20	4/33
Catches/stumpings	2/–	20/–	13/–	37/–
- Source: ESPNCricinfo, 15 June 2026

Mosaddek Hossain Saikat (Bengali: মোসাদ্দেক হোসেন সৈকত; born 10 December 1995) is a Bangladeshi cricketer who plays for the Bangladesh national cricket team and for Barisal Division in domestic cricket. He made his international debut in January 2016. He has represented Bangladesh in all three formats: Test, One Day International and Twenty20 International.

== Under-19 career ==
Mosaddek is a right-handed middle-order batsman and off-spin bowler. He played for Bangladesh in two ICC Under-19 World Cups: in Australia in 2012 and in Abu Dhabi in 2013–14. He captained the Bangladesh Under-19 in a two-match series of four-day matches against the Sri Lanka Under-19 in April 2013, scoring 107 in the first match and 74 in the second. He then captained the team again in a five-match series of limited-overs matches immediately afterwards, scoring more than 200 runs, including 98 in the third match which Bangladesh won by one wicket. In England later that year, in a "superb all-round performance", he scored 110* off 113 balls and then took 3 for 38 off 10 overs in a 38-run victory over the England Under-19.

== Senior career ==
At the age of 17, Mosaddek made a century in his second List A match when he scored 100 for Abahani Limited against Prime Doleshwar Sporting Club in 2013–14. He played one first-class match for Dhaka Division in 2013-14 and was selected to play for East Zone at the end of the season, when he took 3 for 65 and 4 for 33 against South Zone. After the 2013–14 season, Cricinfo named him as one of Bangladesh's most promising young players, noting that as a batsman he impressed "with his footwork against spin and ease against pace".

Mosaddek played for Barisal Division in the 2014-15 National Cricket League. Against Rangpur Division at Savar he scored 250 off 448 balls, adding 423 for the fifth wicket with Al-Amin. In his next innings a few days later on the neighbouring cricket ground, Mosaddek scored 282 off 309 balls. Both matches were drawn. In the second innings of the last match of the season, he scored 119 for South Zone in the Bangladesh Cricket League, taking him past 1000 for the season and his career.

Mosaddek began 2015–16 with 122 (including six sixes) and 40 for Barisal Division, top-scoring in each innings, and scoring the first century of the worldwide 2015–16 season. In the next match, he scored 200 not out (with seven sixes) and 61, again top-scoring in each innings. Both matches were drawn. His 200 not out made him the first Bangladesh batsman to score three first-class double-centuries.

Mosaddek toured South Africa and Zimbabwe with Bangladesh A in October–November 2015. He was Bangladesh A's top-scorer in the two first-class matches, against Zimbabwe A, with 194 runs at 64.66.

In October 2018, Mossadek was named in the squad for the Chittagong Vikings team, following the draft for the 2018–19 Bangladesh Premier League. He captained Abahani Limited to victory in the 2018–19 Dhaka Premier Division Cricket League. In November 2019, he was selected to play for the Sylhet Thunder in the 2019–20 Bangladesh Premier League.

Mosaddek played for Gazi Group Chattogram in Bangabandhu T20 cup.

== International career ==
Mosaddek made his Twenty20 International (T20I) debut for Bangladesh against Zimbabwe on 20 January 2016.

Mosaddek made his One Day International (ODI) debut for Bangladesh against Afghanistan on 28 September 2016, and became the first player for Bangladesh to take a wicket with his very first delivery in an ODI. He scored an unbeaten 45 after coming in at number seven and batting with the tail. That complemented his figures of 2-31 off 10 overs, and a catch. However, this did not prevent Bangladesh losing the game by two wickets.

In February 2017, Mosaddek was added to Bangladesh's Test squad ahead of their one-off match against India after Imrul Kayes was injured. He made his Test debut against Sri Lanka on 15 March 2017, in Bangladesh's 100th Test match, and scored 75 in the first innings, batting at number eight.

In December 2018, Mosaddek was named in Bangladesh's team for the 2018 ACC Emerging Teams Asia Cup. In April 2019, he was named in Bangladesh's squad for the 2019 Cricket World Cup. The International Cricket Council (ICC) named him as one of the five surprise picks for the tournament.

Mosaddek holds the record for the fastest fifty by any Bangladeshi. Against West Indies on 17 May 2019 he scored 50 runs in just 20 balls in the 2019 Ireland Tri-Nation Series. On 2 August 2022, he led Bangladesh for the first time in an international match, a T20I against Zimbabwe in Harare.

On 9 June 2026, Mosaddek returned to the Bangladesh ODI side after an absence of four years. He scored 86 not out then took two wickets and a catch in Bangladesh's victory over Australia, and won the player of the match award.
