= 2025–26 Bangladesh Premier League =

12th edition of Bangladesh Premier League

- Dates: 26 December 2025 – 23 January 2026
- Administrator: Bangladesh Cricket Board
- Cricket format: Twenty20
- Tournament format(s): Double round-robin and playoffs
- Host: Bangladesh
- Champions: Rajshahi Warriors (2nd title)
- Runners-up: Chattogram Royals
- Participants: 6
- Matches: 34
- Player of the series: Shoriful Islam (Chattogram Royals)
- Most runs: Parvez Hossain Emon (395) (Sylhet Titans)
- Most wickets: Shoriful Islam (26) (Chattogram Royals)
- Official website: bplt20.com.bd

2025–26 Bangladesh Premier League (BPL 2026) was the 12th season of the Bangladesh Premier League, a professional Twenty20 cricket league in Bangladesh that is organised by the Bangladesh Cricket Board (BCB). The season commenced on 26 December 2025, and the final was held on 23 January 2026. Rajshahi Warriors beat Chattogram Royals in the final by 63 runs and won their second title.

== Background ==
The 2025–26 BPL season overlapped with the BBL 15, SA20 2026, Super Smash 2025–26 and ILT20 2025–26.

During the previous season, payment-related issues involving Durbar Rajshahi and Chittagong Kings were reported. For the 2025–26 season, the Bangladesh Cricket Board disqualified teams that failed to submit the required documentation.

The 2026 general elections were also a reason for organising the BPL with fewer teams to complete the competition before the election.

The Chattogram franchise was acquired by Triangle Sports and renamed Chattogram Royals. The Rajshahi franchise also underwent a change in ownership, with Nabil Group of Industries taking over and renaming the team Rajshahi Warriors. The Sylhet franchise came under new ownership by Cricket With Sami and was renamed Sylhet Titans. Noakhali Express was introduced as a new franchise after being acquired by Desh Travels. The Khulna Tigers and Fortune Barishal franchises did not participate in the season.

The auction took place on 30 November 2025. Pakistan based company, TPT – Trans Production & Technologies won the official broadcasting rights for the 2025–26 BPL – Bangladesh Premier League replacing Real Impact.

On 25 December 2025, Triangle Sports terminated the ownership of Chattogram Royals, and the Bangladesh Cricket Board took charge.

=== Opening ceremony ===
An opening ceremony had been previously planned to be on 23 December 2025 in Dhaka ahead of the opening game of this season of the BPL. But later, due to security concerns, BCB had decided to arrange an opening ceremony shortly before the opening game at Sylhet on 26 December 2026, and so the scheduled time of the first two matches of the first day of BPL got delayed by 1 hour and 45 minutes, respectively. Therefore, the opening game between Sylhet Titans and Rajshahi Warriors commenced at 3:00 pm and the second match between Noakhali Express and Chattogram Royals at 7:45 pm local time which had been previously scheduled at 2:00 pm and 7:00 pm, respectively. The opening ceremony was held in two phases. The first phase was before the start of the first match of the day, and the second phase was held in the interval between the two matches of the opening day.

== Pre-season ==
=== Practice Match ===
A practice match was played between the Rajshahi Warriors and the Rangpur Riders as the North Bengal derby before the league stage. Only the local players of both teams featured in that match.

Practice Match
22 December 2025
12:30 (GMT+6:00)

Rangpur Riders; 136/5 (20 overs)	v	Rajshahi Warriors; 139/5 (18.1 overs)
Iftakhar Hossain Ifti 58 (45); Abdul Gaffar Saqlain 2/18 (3 overs)		Najmul Hossain Shanto 34 (32); Abdul Halim 2/7 (2.1 overs)

Rajshahi Warriors won by 5 wickets
Rangpur Riders Cricket Arena, Dhaka

- Rajshahi Warriors won the toss and elected to field.

== Match Officials & Commentators ==
=== Match Officials ===
These are the match officials for this season of BPL:

Match Referees

- (Bangladesh) Neeyamur Rashid
- (Bangladesh) Akhtar Ahmad
- (Bangladesh) Salim Shahed
- (Australia) Simon Taufel

Umpires

- (Bangladesh) Sharfuddoula
- (Bangladesh) Tanvir Ahmed
- (Bangladesh) Masudur Rahman
- (Bangladesh) Morshed Ali Khan
- (Bangladesh) Gazi Sohel
- (Bangladesh) Muhammad Kamruzzaman
- (Bangladesh) Ali Arman
- (Bangladesh) Sajedul Islam
- (Pakistan) Asif Yaqoob
- (Sri Lanka) Ruchira Palliyaguruge

=== Commentators ===
These are the commentators for this season of BPL:

Commentators

- (Bangladesh) Athar Ali Khan
- (Bangladesh) Shamim Chowdhury
- (Bangladesh) Samonnoy Ghosh
- (Bangladesh) Mazhar Uddin Omi
- (New Zealand) Danny Morrison
- (England) Darren Gough
- (Cricket West Indies) Samuel Badree
- (Pakistan) Waqar Younis
- (Pakistan) Ramiz Raja
- (Sri Lanka) Farveez Maharoof
- (Australia) Jamie Cox

Presenters/Hosts

- (Pakistan) Zainab Abbas (Note: She will also work as a commentator.)
- ~~(India) Ridhima Pathak~~ (Note: She cancelled her contract with BPL.)

== Teams ==
Five franchises were confirmed initially, and on 24 November, Noakhali Express joined as the sixth team.

Locations of 2026 Bangladesh Premier League teams

Team	Location	Owner	Head Coach	Captain
Chattogram Royals	Chattogram	Bangladesh Cricket Board	(Bangladesh) Mizanur Rahman Babul	(Bangladesh) Mahedi Hasan
Dhaka Capitals	Dhaka	Champion Sports	(England) Toby Radford	(Bangladesh) Mohammad Mithun
Noakhali Express	Noakhali	Desh Travels	(Bangladesh) Khaled Mahmud	(Bangladesh) Shykat Ali (Note: Captained in only their first and second match of BPL.) (Pakistan) Haider Ali
Rajshahi Warriors	Rajshahi	Nabil Group of Industries	(Bangladesh) Hannan Sarkar	(Bangladesh) Najmul Hossain Shanto
Rangpur Riders	Rangpur	Toggi Sports	(South Africa) Mickey Arthur	(Bangladesh) Nurul Hasan Sohan (Bangladesh) Litton Das (Note: Started captaining from their ninth group match.)
Sylhet Titans	Sylhet	Cricket With Sami	(Bangladesh) Sohel Islam	(Bangladesh) Mehidy Hasan Miraz

== Squads ==
The auction took place on 30 November 2025. Before the event, each franchise was permitted to secure two local players and up to two overseas players through direct signings. At the auction, opening batter Mohammad Naim emerged as the most expensive local player after being signed by Chattogram Royals for $90,300 (approx. BDT 1.1 crore). Meanwhile, Sri Lanka's Dasun Shanaka emerged as the highest-paid overseas player, joining Dhaka Capitals for a bid of $55,000 (approx. BDT 67.15 lakh).

The full squads are as follows:

Chattogram Royals	Dhaka Capitals	Noakhali Express	Rajshahi Warriors	Rangpur Riders	Sylhet Titans
Coaches
(Bangladesh) Mizanur Rahman Babul	(England) Toby Radford	(Bangladesh) Khaled Mahmud	(Bangladesh) Hannan Sarkar	(South Africa) Mickey Arthur	(Bangladesh) Sohel Islam
Captain
(Bangladesh) Mahedi Hasan	(Bangladesh) Mohammad Mithun (wk)	(Bangladesh) Shykat Ali (Pakistan) Haider Ali	(Bangladesh) Najmul Hossain Shanto	(Bangladesh) Nurul Hasan Sohan (wk) (Bangladesh) Litton Das (wk)	(Bangladesh) Mehidy Hasan Miraz
Players
(Bangladesh) Abu Hider; (Bangladesh) Arafat Sunny; (Bangladesh) Mahfijul Islam; (Bangladesh) Mahmudul Hasan Joy; (Bangladesh) Mohammad Naim; (Bangladesh) Mukidul Islam; (Bangladesh) Salman Hossain; (Bangladesh) Shadman Islam; (Bangladesh) Shoriful Islam; (Bangladesh) Shuvagata Hom; (Bangladesh) Sumon Khan; (Bangladesh) Tanvir Islam; (Bangladesh) Ziaur Rahman; (Bangladesh) Zahiduzzaman (wk); (Pakistan) Aamir Jamal; (Pakistan) Asif Ali; (Pakistan) Hassan Nawaz; (Pakistan) Kamran Ghulam; (Pakistan) Mirza Tahir Baig; (Pakistan) Mohammad Haris (wk); (England) Adam Rossington (wk); (South Africa) Cameron Delport	(Bangladesh) Abdullah Al Mamun; (Bangladesh) Irfan Sukkur (wk); (Bangladesh) Jayed Ullah; (Bangladesh) Maruf Mridha; (Bangladesh) Mohammad Saifuddin; (Bangladesh) Moinul Islam; (Bangladesh) Nasir Hossain; (Bangladesh) Sabbir Rahman; (Bangladesh) Saif Hassan; (Bangladesh) Shamim Hossain; (Bangladesh) Taijul Islam; (Bangladesh) Taskin Ahmed; (Bangladesh) Tofael Ahmed; (Afghanistan) Rahmanullah Gurbaz (wk); (Afghanistan) Ziaur Rahman; (Afghanistan) Zubaid Akbari; (Pakistan) Salman Mirza; (Pakistan) Usman Khan (wk); (Pakistan) Imad Wasim; (Sweden) Choudry Share Ali; (Sweden) Mohammad Arif Hussain; (Sri Lanka) Dasun Shanaka; (Cricket West Indies) Odean Smith	(Bangladesh) Abu Hasim; (Bangladesh) Abu Jayed; (Bangladesh) Habibur Rahman; (Bangladesh) Hasan Mahmud; (Bangladesh) Jaker Ali (wk); (Bangladesh) Mahidul Islam Ankon (wk); (Bangladesh) Mehedi Rana; (Bangladesh) Munim Shahriar; (Bangladesh) Musfik Hasan; (Bangladesh) Nazmul Islam; (Bangladesh) Rahmatullah Ali; (Bangladesh) Rejaur Rahman; (Bangladesh) Sabbir Hossain; (Bangladesh) Shahadat Hossain Dipu; (Bangladesh) Soumya Sarkar; (Afghanistan) Mohammad Nabi; (Afghanistan) Zahir Khan; (Afghanistan) Bilal Sami; (Afghanistan) Hassan Eisakhil; (Pakistan) Maaz Sadaqat; (Pakistan) Ihsanullah Khan; (Cricket West Indies) Johnson Charles (wk)	(Bangladesh) Abdul Gaffar Saqlain; (Bangladesh) Akbar Ali (wk); (Bangladesh) Hasan Murad; (Bangladesh) Jishan Alam; (Bangladesh) MD Rubel; (Bangladesh) Mushfiqur Rahim (wk); (Bangladesh) Ripon Mondol; (Bangladesh) Robiul Haque; (Bangladesh) SM Meherob; (Bangladesh) Shakhir Hossain; (Bangladesh) Tanzid Hasan; (Bangladesh) Tanzim Hasan Sakib; (Bangladesh) Wasi Siddiquee; (Bangladesh) Yasir Ali; (Pakistan) Hussain Talat; (Pakistan) Jahandad Khan; (Pakistan) Sahibzada Farhan; (Pakistan) Mohammad Nawaz; (Sri Lanka) Binura Fernando; (New Zealand) Jimmy Neesham; (New Zealand) Kane Williamson; (United Arab Emirates) Muhammad Waseem; (Zimbabwe) Ryan Burl; (Nepal) Sandeep Lamichhane	(Bangladesh) Abdul Halim; (Bangladesh) Aliss Islam; (Bangladesh) Iftakhar Hossain Ifti; (Bangladesh) Mahmudullah; (Bangladesh) Mehedi Hasan Sohag; (Bangladesh) Mrittunjoy Chowdhury; (Bangladesh) Mustafizur Rahman; (Bangladesh) Nahid Rana; (Bangladesh) Nayeem Hasan; (Bangladesh) Rakibul Hasan; (Bangladesh) Tawhid Hridoy; (Pakistan) Akif Javed; (Pakistan) Faheem Ashraf; (Pakistan) Iftikhar Ahmed; (Pakistan) Khawaja Nafay; (Pakistan) Khushdil Shah; (Pakistan) Muhammad Akhlaq; (Pakistan) Sufiyan Muqeem; (England) Dawid Malan; (Cricket West Indies) Kyle Mayers; (Italy) Emilio Gay	(Bangladesh) Afif Hossain; (Bangladesh) Ariful Islam; (Bangladesh) Ebadot Hossain; (Bangladesh) Khaled Ahmed; (Bangladesh) Mominul Haque; (Bangladesh) Nasum Ahmed; (Bangladesh) Parvez Hossain Emon (wk); (Bangladesh) Rahatul Ferdous; (Bangladesh) Rony Talukdar (wk); (Bangladesh) Ruyel Miah; (Bangladesh) Shohidul Islam; (Bangladesh) Tawfique Khan Tushar; (Bangladesh) Zakir Hasan; (Pakistan) Mohammad Amir; (Pakistan) Saim Ayub; (Pakistan) Salman Irshad; (Afghanistan) Azmatullah Omarzai; (Afghanistan) Hazratullah Zazai; (England) Chris Woakes; (England) Ethan Brookes; (England) Moeen Ali; (England) Sam Billings (wk)
Withdrawal/Absent/Injured Players
(Pakistan) Abrar Ahmed; (Sri Lanka) Angelo Perera; (Sri Lanka) Avishka Fernando; (Sri Lanka) Charith Asalanka; (Sri Lanka) Niroshan Dickwella (wk); (Ireland) Paul Stirling; (Afghanistan) Masood Gurbaz	(England) Alex Hales	(Sri Lanka) Kusal Mendis (wk)	(Sri Lanka) Dushan Hemantha	(Bangladesh) Kamrul Islam Rabbi	(United States) Aaron Jones; (Sri Lanka) Angelo Mathews

== Venues ==
Dhaka	Sylhet
Sher-e-Bangla National Cricket Stadium	Sylhet International Cricket Stadium
Capacity: 25,416	Capacity: 18,500
Matches: 10	Matches: 24
2025–26 Bangladesh Premier League is located in Bangladesh

== Standings ==
=== Points table ===
Pos	Team	Pld	W	L	NR	Pts	NRR	Qualification
1	Rajshahi Warriors (C)	10	8	2	0	16	0.335	Advanced to Qualifier 1
2	Chattogram Royals (R)	10	6	4	0	12	0.497	Advanced to Qualifier 1
3	Rangpur Riders (4th)	10	6	4	0	12	0.220	Advanced to Eliminator
4	Sylhet Titans (3rd)	10	5	5	0	10	0.373	Advanced to Eliminator
5	Dhaka Capitals	10	3	7	0	6	−0.381	Eliminated
6	Noakhali Express	10	2	8	0	4	−1.038	Eliminated

Source: ESPNcricinfo & Cricbuzz
(C) Champions; (R) Runners up

=== Match summary ===
Team	Group matches										Playoffs		
Team	1	2	3	4	5	6	7	8	9	10	Q1/E	Q2	F
Chattogram Royals	2	2	4	6	6	8	10	12	12	12	W		L
Dhaka Capitals	2	2	2	2	4	4	4	4	4	6			
Noakhali Express	0	0	0	0	0	0	2	4	4	4			
Rajshahi Warriors	2	2	4	6	8	8	10	12	14	16	L	W	W
Rangpur Riders	2	2	4	6	8	8	8	8	10	12	L		
Sylhet Titans	0	2	4	4	4	6	6	8	10	10	W	L	

Win	Loss	No result

- Note: The total points at the end of each group match are listed.
- Note: Click on the points (group matches) or W/L (playoffs) to see the match summary.

Visitor team →	CR	DC	NE	RW	RR	STT
Home team ↓	CR	DC	NE	RW	RR	STT
Chattogram Royals		Dhaka; 42 runs	Chattogram; 5 wickets	Rajshahi; 3 wickets	Rangpur; 5 wickets	Chattogram; 14 runs
Dhaka Capitals	Chattogram; 10 wickets		Dhaka; 7 wickets	Dhaka; 5 wickets	Rangpur; 5 runs	Sylhet; 20 runs
Noakhali Express	Chattogram; 65 runs	Noakhali; 41 runs		Rajshahi; 4 wickets	Noakhali; 9 runs	Sylhet; 6 wickets
Rajshahi Warriors	Chattogram; 2 wickets	Rajshahi; 7 wickets	Rajshahi; 6 wickets		Rajshahi; 7 wickets	Rajshahi; 5 runs
Rangpur Riders	Rangpur; 7 wickets	Rangpur; 11 runs	Rangpur; 8 wickets	Rajshahi; Super Over		Sylhet; 6 wickets
Sylhet Titans	Chattogram; 9 wickets	Sylhet; 6 runs	Sylhet; 1 wicket	Rajshahi; 8 wickets	Rangpur; 6 wickets	

Home team won	Visitor team won

- Note: Results listed are according to the home (horizontal) and visitor (vertical) teams.
- Note: Click on a result to see a summary of the match.

== League stage ==
The BCB officially published the schedule on 2 December 2025. The schedules were again revised and published on 31 December 2025 by BCB.

=== Sylhet Phase ===
Match 1
26 December 2025
15:00 (D/N)
Scorecard

Sylhet Titans; 190/5 (20 overs)	v	Rajshahi Warriors; 192/2 (19.4 overs)
Parvez Hossain Emon 65* (33); Sandeep Lamichhane 2/38 (4 overs)		Najmul Hossain Shanto 101* (60); Khaled Ahmed 1/30 (3 overs)

Rajshahi Warriors won by 8 wickets
Sylhet International Cricket Stadium, Sylhet
Umpires: Tanvir Ahmed (Ban) and Sharfuddoula (Ban)
Player of the match: Najmul Hossain Shanto (Rajshahi Warriors)

- Rajshahi Warriors won the toss and elected to field.

Match 2
26 December 2025
19:45 (N)
Scorecard

Chattogram Royals; 174/6 (20 overs)	v	Noakhali Express; 109 (16.5 overs)
Mirza Tahir Baig 80 (69); Sabbir Hossain 2/9 (1 over)		Maaz Sadaqat 38 (27); Tanvir Islam 3/39 (4 overs)

Chattogram Royals won by 65 runs
Sylhet International Cricket Stadium, Sylhet
Umpires: Masudur Rahman (Ban) and Asif Yaqoob (Pak)
Player of the match: Mirza Tahir Baig (Chattogram Royals)

- Chattogram Royals won the toss and elected to bat.
- This was the first match of the BPL for Noakhali Express.

Match 3
27 December 2025
13:00
Scorecard

Rajshahi Warriors; 132/8 (20 overs)	v	Dhaka Capitals; 134/5 (18.5 overs)
Najmul Hossain Shanto 37 (28); Imad Wasim 3/16 (4 overs)		Abdullah Al Mamun 45 (39); Mohammad Nawaz 3/21 (4 overs)

Dhaka Capitals won by 5 wickets
Sylhet International Cricket Stadium, Sylhet
Umpires: Morshed Ali Khan (Ban) and Ruchira Palliyaguruge (SL)
Player of the match: Imad Wasim (Dhaka Capitals)

- Dhaka Capitals won the toss and elected to field.

Match 4
27 December 2025
18:00 (N)
Scorecard

Noakhali Express; 143/7 (20 overs)	v	Sylhet Titans; 144/9 (20 overs)
Mahidul Islam Ankon 61* (51); Khaled Ahmed 4/23 (4 overs)		Parvez Hossain Emon 60 (41); Mehedi Hasan Rana 4/34 (4 overs)

Sylhet Titans won by 1 wicket
Sylhet International Cricket Stadium, Sylhet
Umpires: Muhammad Kamruzzaman (Ban) and Asif Yaqoob (Pak)
Player of the match: Khaled Ahmed (Sylhet Titans)

- Sylhet Titans won the toss and elected to field.
- Mehedi Hasan Rana (Noakhali Express) took his first hat-trick in T20s, overall ninth in BPL and the first in this season.

Match 5
29 December 2025
13:00
Scorecard

Chattogram Royals; 102 (17.5 overs)	v	Rangpur Riders; 107/3 (15 overs)
Mohammad Naim 39 (20); Faheem Ashraf 5/17 (3.5 overs)		Dawid Malan 51 (48); Mukidul Islam 2/5 (2 overs)

Rangpur Riders won by 7 wickets
Sylhet International Cricket Stadium, Sylhet
Umpires: Sajedul Islam (Ban) and Asif Yaqoob (Pak)
Player of the match: Faheem Ashraf (Rangpur Riders)

- Rangpur Riders won the toss and elected to field.

Match 6
29 December 2025
18:00 (N)
Scorecard

Noakhali Express; 124/8 (20 overs)	v	Rajshahi Warriors; 125/4 (17.5 overs)
Haider Ali 33 (28); Ripon Mondol 4/13 (4 overs)		Tanzid Hasan 29 (20); Hasan Mahmud 2/19 (4 overs)

Rajshahi Warriors won by 6 wickets
Sylhet International Cricket Stadium, Sylhet
Umpires: Ali Arman (Ban) and Sharfuddoula (Ban)
Player of the match: Ripon Mondol (Rajshahi Warriors)

- Rajshahi Warriors won the toss and elected to field.
- Haider Ali started captaining Noakhali Express from this match as their previously selected captain Shykat Ali didn't feature.

Match 7
1 January 2026
13:00
Scorecard

Sylhet Titans; 173/5 (20 overs)	v	Dhaka Capitals; 167/8 (20 overs)
Azmatullah Omarzai 50* (24); Salman Mirza 2/46 (4 overs)		Shamim Hossain 81* (43); Azmatullah Omarzai 3/40 (4 overs)

Sylhet Titans won by 6 runs
Sylhet International Cricket Stadium, Sylhet
Umpires: Morshed Ali Khan (Ban) and Sharfuddoula (Ban)
Player of the match: Azmatullah Omarzai (Sylhet Titans)

- Dhaka Capitals won the toss and elected to field.

Match 8
1 January 2026
18:00 (N)
Scorecard

Rajshahi Warriors; 159/8 (20 overs)	v	Rangpur Riders; 159/6 (20 overs)
Sahibzada Farhan 65 (46); Faheem Ashraf 3/43 (4 overs)		Dawid Malan 63* (50); SM Meherob 2/17 (4 overs)

Match tied
(Rajshahi Warriors won the Super Over)
Sylhet International Cricket Stadium, Sylhet
Umpires: Asif Yaqoob (Pak) and Gazi Sohel (Ban)
Player of the match: Ripon Mondol (Rajshahi Warriors)

- Rangpur Riders won the toss and elected to field.
- Super Over: Rangpur Riders 6/2, Rajshahi Warriors 10/0.

Match 9
2 January 2026
14:00
Scorecard

Dhaka Capitals; 122 (19.4 overs)	v	Chattogram Royals; 123/0 (12.4 overs)
Mohammad Saifuddin 33* (25); Tanvir Islam 3/8 (4 overs)		Adam Rossington 60* (36)

Chattogram Royals won by 10 wickets
Sylhet International Cricket Stadium, Sylhet
Umpires: Ali Arman (Ban) and Masudur Rahman (Ban)
Player of the match: Adam Rossington (Chattogram Royals)

- Chattogram Royals won the toss and elected to field.

Match 10
2 January 2026
19:00 (N)
Scorecard

Sylhet Titans; 144/8 (20 overs)	v	Rangpur Riders; 145/4 (18.5 overs)
Afif Hossain 46 (31); Faheem Ashraf 3/18 (4 overs)		Litton Das 35 (25); Ethan Brookes 1/13 (1 over)

Rangpur Riders won by 6 wickets
Sylhet International Cricket Stadium, Sylhet
Umpires: Asif Yaqoob (Pak) and Muhammad Kamruzzaman (Ban)
Player of the match: Mahmudullah (Rangpur Riders)

- Rangpur Riders won the toss and elected to field.
- Mustafizur Rahman (Rangpur Riders) completed 400 wickets in his T20 career.

Match 11
4 January 2026
13:00
Scorecard

Sylhet Titans; 126/7 (20 overs)	v	Chattogram Royals; 130/1 (16 overs)
Azmatullah Omarzai 44 (41); Mahedi Hasan 2/18 (4 overs)		Adam Rossington 73* (53); Rahatul Ferdous 1/29 (3 overs)

Chattogram Royals won by 9 wickets
Sylhet International Cricket Stadium, Sylhet
Umpires: Gazi Sohel (Ban) and Sajedul Islam (Ban)
Player of the match: Mohammad Naim (Chattogram Royals)

- Chattogram Royals won the toss and elected to field.
- Match postponed from 30 December 2025 to 4 January 2026 due to the passing away of the ex-Prime Minister of Bangladesh, Khaleda Zia.

Match 12
4 January 2026
18:00 (N)
Scorecard

Rangpur Riders; 155/5 (20 overs)	v	Dhaka Capitals; 150/4 (20 overs)
Mahmudullah 51 (41); Ziaur Rahman 2/35 (4 overs)		Mohammad Mithun 56* (38); Kyle Mayers 1/7 (2 overs)

Rangpur Riders won by 5 runs
Sylhet International Cricket Stadium, Sylhet
Umpires: Ruchira Palliyaguruge (SL) and Tanvir Ahmed (Ban)
Player of the match: Mahmudullah (Rangpur Riders)

- Dhaka Capitals won the toss and elected to field.
- Match postponed from 30 December 2025 to 4 January 2026 due to the passing away of the ex-Prime Minister of Bangladesh, Khaleda Zia.

Match 13
5 January 2026
13:00
Scorecard

Noakhali Express; 61 (14.2 overs)	v	Sylhet Titans; 62/4 (8.4 overs)
Mahidul Islam Ankon 25 (32); Nasum Ahmed 5/7 (4 overs)		Tawfique Khan 32 (18); Zahir Khan 3/8 (1.4 overs)

Sylhet Titans won by 6 wickets
Sylhet International Cricket Stadium, Sylhet
Umpires: Ruchira Palliyaguruge (SL) and Sharfuddoula (Ban)
Player of the match: Nasum Ahmed (Sylhet Titans)

- Noakhali Express won the toss and elected to bat.

Match 14
5 January 2026
18:00 (N)
Scorecard

Chattogram Royals; 169/5 (20 overs)	v	Rangpur Riders; 170/5 (18.5 overs)
Adam Rossington 58 (41); Akif Javed 2/29 (4 overs)		Kyle Mayers 50 (25); Shoriful Islam 3/37 (4 overs)

Rangpur Riders won by 5 wickets
Sylhet International Cricket Stadium, Sylhet
Umpires: Asif Yaqoob (Pak) and Gazi Sohel (Ban)
Player of the match: Kyle Mayers (Rangpur Riders)

- Rangpur Riders won the toss and elected to field.
- Litton Das (Rangpur Riders) completed 6000 runs in his T20 career.

Match 15
7 January 2026
13:00
Scorecard

Noakhali Express; 133/6 (20 overs)	v	Dhaka Capitals; 134/3 (14.1 overs)
Haider Ali 47 (36); Abdullah Al Mamun 1/6 (1 over)		Nasir Hossain 90* (50); Hasan Mahmud 2/17 (3 overs)

Dhaka Capitals won by 7 wickets
Sylhet International Cricket Stadium, Sylhet
Umpires: Ruchira Palliyaguruge (SL) and Sajedul Islam (Ban)
Player of the match: Nasir Hossain (Dhaka Capitals)

- Dhaka Capitals won the toss and elected to field.

Match 16
7 January 2026
18:00 (N)
Scorecard

Chattogram Royals; 198/5 (20 overs)	v	Sylhet Titans; 184 (19.4 overs)
Adam Rossington 49 (38); Ruyel Miah 3/41 (4 overs)		Afif Hossain 46 (33); Aamir Jamal 4/34 (4 overs)

Chattogram Royals won by 14 runs
Sylhet International Cricket Stadium, Sylhet
Umpires: Asif Yaqoob (Pak) and Morshed Ali Khan (Ban)
Player of the match: Mahmudul Hasan Joy (Chattogram Royals)

- Sylhet Titans won the toss and elected to field.

Match 17
8 January 2026
13:00
Scorecard

Noakhali Express; 151/5 (20 overs)	v	Rajshahi Warriors; 152/6 (19 overs)
Soumya Sarkar 59 (43); Ripon Mondol 2/27 (4 overs)		Muhammad Waseem 60 (35); Mehedi Hasan Rana 3/25 (4 overs)

Rajshahi Warriors won by 4 wickets
Sylhet International Cricket Stadium, Sylhet
Umpires: Muhammad Kamruzzaman (Ban) and Sharfuddoula (Ban)
Player of the match: Muhammad Waseem (Rajshahi Warriors)

- Rajshahi Warriors won the toss and elected to field.

Match 18
8 January 2026
18:00 (N)
Scorecard

Sylhet Titans; 180/6 (20 overs)	v	Dhaka Capitals; 160/8 (20 overs)
Ariful Islam 38 (29); Ziaur Rahman 3/35 (4 overs)		Rahmanullah Gurbaz 51 (44); Salman Irshad 3/25 (4 overs)

Sylhet Titans won by 20 runs
Sylhet International Cricket Stadium, Sylhet
Umpires: Ruchira Palliyaguruge (SL) and Tanvir Ahmed (Ban)
Player of the match: Moeen Ali (Sylhet Titans)

- Dhaka Capitals won the toss and elected to field.
- Ariful Islam (Sylhet Titans) made his BPL debut.
- Sabbir Rahman (Dhaka Capitals) completed 2000 runs in his BPL career.

Match 19
9 January 2026
14:00
Scorecard

Rajshahi Warriors; 128/9 (20 overs)	v	Chattogram Royals; 129/8 (20 overs)
Muhammad Waseem 19 (14); Aamir Jamal 3/23 (4 overs)		Hassan Nawaz 35* (36); Binura Fernando 3/18 (4 overs)

Chattogram Royals won by 2 wickets
Sylhet International Cricket Stadium, Sylhet
Umpires: Gazi Sohel (Ban) and Ruchira Palliyaguruge (SL)
Player of the match: Aamir Jamal (Chattogram Royals)

- Chattogram Royals won the toss and elected to field.
- Binura Fernando (Rajshahi Warriors) completed 150 wickets in his T20 career.

Match 20
9 January 2026
19:00 (N)
Scorecard

Noakhali Express; 148 (19.5 overs)	v	Rangpur Riders; 139/9 (20 overs)
Jaker Ali 38 (37); Mustafizur Rahman 3/18 (4 overs)		Iftikhar Ahmed 37 (31); Hasan Mahmud 4/26 (4 overs)

Noakhali Express won by 9 runs
Sylhet International Cricket Stadium, Sylhet
Umpires: Asif Yaqoob (Pak) and Tanvir Ahmed (Ban)
Player of the match: Hasan Mahmud (Noakhali Express)

- Rangpur Riders won the toss and elected to field.
- Mrittunjoy Chowdhury (Rangpur Riders) took the second hat-trick in his BPL career, overall tenth in BPL and the second in this season. He became the first player to take hat-trick multiple times in BPL history.

Match 21
11 January 2026
13:00
Scorecard

Rangpur Riders; 178/4 (20 overs)	v	Rajshahi Warriors; 179/3 (19.1 overs)
Tawhid Hridoy 97* (56); Sandeep Lamichhane 1/21 (4 overs)		Muhammad Waseem 87* (59); Akif Javed 2/43 (4 overs)

Rajshahi Warriors won by 7 wickets
Sylhet International Cricket Stadium, Sylhet
Umpires: Gazi Sohel (Ban) and Ruchira Palliyaguruge (SL)
Player of the match: Najmul Hossain Shanto (Rajshahi Warriors)

- Rajshahi Warriors won the toss and elected to field.

Match 22
11 January 2026
18:00 (N)
Scorecard

Noakhali Express; 184/7 (20 overs)	v	Dhaka Capitals; 143 (18.2 overs)
Hassan Eisakhil 92 (60); Mohammad Saifuddin 2/23 (3 overs)		Mohammad Saifuddin 34 (20); Hasan Mahmud 2/21 (3.2 overs)

Noakhali Express won by 41 runs
Sylhet International Cricket Stadium, Sylhet
Umpires: Morshed Ali Khan (Ban) and Asif Yaqoob (Pak)
Player of the match: Hassan Eisakhil (Noakhali Express)

- Noakhali Express won the toss and elected to bat.
- Hassan Eisakhil (Noakhali Express) made his BPL debut.

Match 23
12 January 2026
13:00
Scorecard

Rangpur Riders; 114 (19.1 overs)	v	Sylhet Titans; 119/4 (17.3 overs)
Khushdil Shah 30 (24); Nasum Ahmed 3/19 (4 overs)		Parvez Hossain Emon 52* (41); Nahid Rana 2/18 (3 overs)

Sylhet Titans won by 6 wickets
Sylhet International Cricket Stadium, Sylhet
Umpires: Ali Arman (Ban) and Ruchira Palliyaguruge (SL)
Player of the match: Nasum Ahmed (Sylhet Titans)

- Sylhet Titans won the toss and elected to field.
- Parvez Hossain Emon (Sylhet Titans) completed 2000 runs in his T20 career.

Match 24
12 January 2026
18:00 (N)
Scorecard

Dhaka Capitals; 131 (20 overs)	v	Rajshahi Warriors; 132/3 (16.1 overs)
Usman Khan 41 (27); Abdul Gaffar Saqlain 4/24 (4 overs)		Tanzid Hasan 76 (43); Saif Hassan 1/17 (4 overs)

Rajshahi Warriors won by 7 wickets
Sylhet International Cricket Stadium, Sylhet
Umpires: Morshed Ali Khan (Ban) and Tanvir Ahmed (Ban)
Player of the match: Tanzid Hasan (Rajshahi Warriors)

- Dhaka Capitals won the toss and elected to bat.
- Ripon Mondol (Rajshahi Warriors) took the first hat-trick in his BPL career, overall eleventh in BPL and the third in this season.

=== Dhaka Phase ===
Match 25
16 January 2026 (Note: Match rescheduled due to local cricketers' boycott.)
14:00
Scorecard

Noakhali Express; 126 (18.5 overs)	v	Chattogram Royals; 128/5 (17 overs)
Hassan Eisakhil 25 (20); Shoriful Islam 5/9 (3.5 overs)		Mahedi Hasan 49* (36); Ihsanullah 2/23 (4 overs)

Chattogram Royals won by 5 wickets
Sher-e-Bangla National Cricket Stadium, Dhaka
Umpires: Asif Yaqoob (Pak) and Tanvir Ahmed (Ban)
Player of the match: Shoriful Islam (Chattogram Royals)

- Chattogram Royals won the toss and elected to field.

Match 26
16 January 2026
19:00 (N)
Scorecard

Rajshahi Warriors; 147/8 (20 overs)	v	Sylhet Titans; 142/9 (20 overs)
Mushfiqur Rahim 40 (30); Nasum Ahmed 2/30 (4 overs)		Parvez Hossain Emon 41 (30); Ripon Mondol 4/34 (4 overs)

Rajshahi Warriors won by 5 runs
Sher-e-Bangla National Cricket Stadium, Dhaka
Umpires: Gazi Sohel (Ban) and Ruchira Palliyaguruge (SL)
Player of the match: Ripon Mondol (Rajshahi Warriors)

- Sylhet Titans won the toss and elected to field.
- Shohidul Islam (Sylhet Titans) completed 100 wickets in his T20 career.

Match 27
17 January 2026
13:00
Scorecard

Rangpur Riders; 181/4 (20 overs)	v	Dhaka Capitals; 170/7 (20 overs)
Dawid Malan 78 (49); Mohammad Saifuddin 2/33 (4 overs)		Mohammad Saifuddin 58* (30); Nahid Rana 3/11 (4 overs)

Rangpur Riders won by 11 runs
Sher-e-Bangla National Cricket Stadium, Dhaka
Umpires: Morshed Ali Khan (Ban) and Sajedul Islam (BAN)
Player of the match: Dawid Malan (Rangpur Riders)

- Dhaka Capitals won the toss and elected to field.

Match 28
17 January 2026
18:00 (N)
Scorecard

Chattogram Royals; 125 (19.5 overs)	v	Rajshahi Warriors; 126/7 (19.3 overs)
Asif Ali 39 (24); Tanzim Hasan Sakib 4/17 (4 overs)		Akbar Ali 48 (40); Shoriful Islam 4/13 (4 overs)

Rajshahi Warriors won by 3 wickets
Sher-e-Bangla National Cricket Stadium, Dhaka
Umpires: Asif Yaqoob (Pak) and Muhammad Kamruzzaman (Ban)
Player of the match: Akbar Ali (Rajshahi Warriors)

- Rajshahi Warriors won the toss and elected to field.

Match 29
18 January 2026
13:00
Scorecard

Noakhali Express; 173/2 (20 overs)	v	Rangpur Riders; 174/2 (19.4 overs)
Hassan Eisakhil 107* (72); Aliss Islam 1/22 (4 overs)		Tawhid Hridoy 109 (63); Hasan Mahmud 1/23 (4 overs)

Rangpur Riders won by 8 wickets
Sher-e-Bangla National Cricket Stadium, Dhaka
Umpires: Ali Arman (Ban) and Ruchira Palliyaguruge (SL)
Player of the match: Tawhid Hridoy (Rangpur Riders)

- Rangpur Riders won the toss and elected to field.

Match 30
18 January 2026
18:00 (N)
Scorecard

Dhaka Capitals; 170 (19.5 overs)	v	Chattogram Royals; 128 (19.4 overs)
Saif Hassan 73 (44); Tanvir Islam 3/25 (4 overs)		Aamer Jamal 42 (26); Mohammad Saifuddin 4/20 (3.4 overs)

Dhaka Capitals won by 42 runs
Sher-e-Bangla National Cricket Stadium, Dhaka
Umpires: Gazi Sohel (Ban) and Muhammad Kamruzzaman (Ban)
Player of the match: Saif Hassan (Dhaka Capitals)

- Chattogram Royals won the toss and elected to field.

== Playoffs ==
Qualifier 1
20 January — Dhaka
1	Rajshahi Warriors	133 (20 overs)
2	Chattogram Royals	134/4 (19.3 overs)
Eliminator
20 January — Dhaka
3	Rangpur Riders	111/9 (20 overs)
4	Sylhet Titans	112/7 (20 overs)

Qualifier 2
21 January — Dhaka
Q1L	Rajshahi Warriors	165/9 (20 overs)
EW	Sylhet Titans	153/8 (20 overs)

Final
23 January — Dhaka
Q1W	Chattogram Royals	111 (17.5 overs)
Q2W	Rajshahi Warriors	174/4 (20 overs)

=== Eliminator ===
Match 31
20 January 2026
13:00
Scorecard

Rangpur Riders; 111/9 (20 overs)	v	Sylhet Titans; 112/7 (20 overs)
Mahmudullah 33 (26); Khaled Ahmed 4/14 (4 overs)		Sam Billings 29 (40); Aliss Islam 2/18 (4 overs)

Sylhet Titans won by 3 wickets
Sher-e-Bangla National Cricket Stadium, Dhaka
Umpires: Gazi Sohel (Ban) and Asif Yaqoob (Pak)

- Sylhet Titans won the toss and elected to field.

=== Qualifier 1 ===
Match 32
20 January 2026
18:00 (N)
Scorecard

Rajshahi Warriors; 133 (20 overs)	v	Chattogram Royals; 134/4 (19.3 overs)
Tanzid Hasan 41 (37); Mahedi Hasan 2/20 (4 overs)		Mirza Baig 45 (47); Abdul Gaffar Saqlain 2/20 (4 overs)

Chattogram Royals won by 6 wickets
Sher-e-Bangla National Cricket Stadium, Dhaka
Umpires: Tanvir Ahmed (Ban) Ruchira Palliyaguruge (SL)
Player of the match: Mahedi Hasan (Chattogram Royals)

- Chattogram Royals won the toss and elected to field.

=== Qualifier 2 ===
Match 33
21 January 2026
18:00 (N)
Scorecard

Rajshahi Warriors; 165/9 (20 overs)	v	Sylhet Titans; 153/8 (20 overs)
Kane Williamson 45* (38); Salman Irshad 3/23 (4 overs)		Parvez Hossain Emon 48 (34); Binura Fernando 4/19 (4 overs)

Rajshahi Warriors won by 12 runs
Sher-e-Bangla National Cricket Stadium, Dhaka
Umpires: Asif Yaqoob (Pak) and Tanvir Ahmed (Ban)
Player of the match: Binura Fernando (Rajshahi Warriors)

- Sylhet Titans won the toss and elected to field.

=== Final ===
Match 34
23 January 2026
18:00 (N)
Scorecard

Rajshahi Warriors; 174/4 (20 overs)	v	Chattogram Royals; 111 (17.5 overs)
Tanzid Hasan 100 (62); Mukidul Islam 2/20 (4 overs)		Mirza Tahir Baig 39 (36); Binura Fernando 4/9 (3 overs)

Rajshahi Warriors won by 63 runs
Sher-e-Bangla National Cricket Stadium, Dhaka
Umpires: Gazi Sohel (Ban) and Ruchira Palliyaguruge (SL)
Player of the match: Tanzid Hasan (Rajshahi Warriors)

- Chattogram Royals won the toss and elected to field.

== Statistics ==
=== Team Statistics ===
Highest team totals
Score R/W (O)	Team	Against	Result	Venue	Date
198/5 (20)	Chattogram Royals	Sylhet Titans	Won	Sylhet	07/01/2026
192/2 (19.4)	Rajshahi Warriors	Sylhet Titans	Won	Sylhet	26/12/2025
190/5 (20)	Sylhet Titans	Rajshahi Warriors	Lost	Sylhet	26/12/2025
184/7 (20)	Noakhali Express	Dhaka Capitals	Won	Sylhet	11/01/2025
184 (19.4)	Sylhet Titans	Chattogram Royals	Lost	Sylhet	07/01/2026
Source: ESPNCricinfo

=== Batting Statistics ===
Most runs (Note: Excluding super over(s))
Runs	Player	Team	Inns.	HS	SR
395	(Bangladesh) Parvez Hossain Emon	Sylhet Titans	12	65*	132.99
382	(Bangladesh) Tawhid Hridoy	Rangpur Riders	11	109	137.90
356	(Bangladesh) Tanzid Hasan Tamim	Rajshahi Warriors	13	100	136.39
355	(Bangladesh) Najmul Hossain Shanto	Rajshahi Warriors	13	101*	135.49
300	(England) Dawid Malan	Rangpur Riders	9	78	112.35
Source: ESPNCricinfo

=== Bowling Statistics ===
Most wickets
Wickets	Player	Team	Inns.	BBI	Econ.
26	(Bangladesh) Shoriful Islam	Chattogram Royals	12	5/9	5.84
18	(Bangladesh) Nasum Ahmed	Sylhet Titans	12	5/7	5.97
18	(Sri Lanka) Binura Fernando	Rajshahi Warriors	11	4/9	6.14
17	(Bangladesh) Ripon Mondol	Rajshahi Warriors	8	4/13	8.53
16	(Bangladesh) Hasan Mahmud	Noakhali Express	10	4/26	6.00
16	(Bangladesh) Mustafizur Rahman	Rangpur Riders	10	3/18	6.89
Source: ESPNCricinfo

=== Boundary Tracker ===
4's tracker
Total 4's	817
Most 4's	(Bangladesh) Tawhid Hridoy (RR) (37)
Source: Cricbuzz

6's tracker
Total 6's	360
Most 6's	(Bangladesh) Parvez Hossain Emon (ST) (19) (Bangladesh) Tanzid Hasan (RW) (19)
Source: Cricbuzz

== Awards ==
Awards	Awardee (Team)	Performance	Prize	Ref
Player of the match in the Final	Tanzid Hasan (Rajshahi Warriors)	100 (62)	৳5 lakh (US$4,100)	
Best Fielder of the tournament	Litton Das (Rangpur Riders)	10 catches (11 innings)	৳3 lakh (US$2,400)	
Highest Wicket-taker of the tournament	Shoriful Islam (Chattogram Royals)	26 wickets (12 innings)	৳5 lakh (US$4,100)	
Highest run-getter of the tournament	Parvez Hossain Emon (Sylhet Titans)	395 runs (12 innings)	৳5 lakh (US$4,100)	
Emerging player of the tournament	Ripon Mondol (Rajshahi Warriors)	17 wickets (8 innings)	৳3 lakh (US$2,400)	
Player of the tournament	Shoriful Islam (Chattogram Royals)	26 wickets (12 innings)	৳10 lakh (US$8,100)	
Runners-up	Chattogram Royals	—N/a	৳1.75 crore (US$140,000)	
Champion	Rajshahi Warriors	—N/a	৳2.75 crore (US$220,000)	

== Broadcasting ==
Here is the list of broadcasters of this season of BPL around the globe:

Broadcasters of BPL
Country/Region	Channels/Platforms
Bangladesh	T Sports; Nagorik TV; Tapmad (BD) (OTT); Akash GO (OTT)
Pakistan	A Sports HD; ARY ZAP; MyCo; Tamasha (OTT); Tapmad (PK) (OTT)
India	FanCode
Afghanistan	Solh TV
Sri Lanka	Dialog TV; Dialog VIU+ App; PEO TV
Nepal	DishHome
North America	Willow TV; Willow DRM (Digital)
Caribbean	Rush Sports
Middle East and North Africa (MENA) (19 countries)	T Sports official YouTube channel
Rest of the world	T Sports official YouTube channel

== See also ==
- 2025–26 Chattogram Royals season
- 2025–26 Dhaka Capitals season
- 2025–26 Noakhali Express season
- 2025–26 Rajshahi Warriors season
- 2025–26 Rangpur Riders season
- 2025–26 Sylhet Titans season
