= 2025–26 Noakhali Express season =

Bangladesh Premier League team season

Noakhali Express
2025–26 season
- Coach: Khaled Mahmud
- Captain: Shykat Ali (Note: Captained in only their first and second match of BPL.); Haider Ali
- Ground(s): Shaheed Bulu Stadium, Noakhali
- BPL League: 6th
- Most runs: Hassan Eisakhil (224)
- Most wickets: Hasan Mahmud (16)
- Most catches: Soumya Sarkar (6)
- Most wicket-keeping dismissals: Jaker Ali (4)

The 2025–26 season is going to be the very first season for the Bangladesh Premier League franchise Noakhali Express. They were one of the six teams participating in the contest that season. This franchise was first introduced by Desh Travels in November 2025 as they are now the owner of this brand new BPL franchise.

== Coaching Panel ==
Position	Name
Head coach	Khaled Mahmud
Assistant coach	Talha Jubair
Batting coach	
Bowling coach	

== Squads ==
The squad of Noakhali Express for 2025–26 season is:

Shirt no.	Name	Nationality	Batting style	Bowling style	Notes
Batters
59	Soumya Sarkar	Bangladesh	Left-handed	Right-arm medium	—N/a
76	Habibur Rahman Sohan	Bangladesh	Right-handed	—N/a	
96	Munim Shahriar	Bangladesh	Right-handed	—N/a	
78	Shahadat Hossain Dipu	Bangladesh	Right-handed	Right-arm off break	—N/a
46	Haider Ali	Pakistan	Right-handed	—N/a	Overseas; Captain
26	Sediqullah Atal	Afghanistan	Left-handed	—N/a	Overseas
07	Hassan Eisakhil	Afghanistan	Right-handed	—N/a	Overseas
17	Evin Lewis	West Indies	Left-handed	Right-arm medium	Overseas
Wicket-keepers
25	Johnson Charles	West Indies	Right-handed	—N/a	Overseas
—N/a	~~Kusal Mendis~~	Sri Lanka	Right-handed	—N/a	Overseas
15	Jaker Ali	Bangladesh	Right-handed	—N/a	
4	Mahidul Islam Ankon	Bangladesh	Right-handed	—N/a	
All-rounders
16	Maaz Sadaqat	Pakistan	Left-handed	Slow left-arm orthodox	Overseas
19	Rahmatullah Ali	Bangladesh	Right-handed	Right-arm off break	—N/a
111	Shykat Ali	Bangladesh	Right-handed	Right-arm medium	Captain
51	Sabbir Hossain	Bangladesh	Right-handed	Right-arm medium	—N/a
7	Mohammad Nabi	Afghanistan	Right-handed	Right-arm off break	Overseas
Spin bowlers
21	Nazmul Islam Apu	Bangladesh	Left-handed	Slow left-arm orthodox	—N/a
8	Abu Hasim	Bangladesh	Left-handed	Slow left-arm orthodox	—N/a
75	Zahir Khan	Afghanistan	Left-handed	Left-arm Chinaman	Overseas
Pace bowlers
91	Hasan Mahmud	Bangladesh	Right-handed	Right-arm fast-medium	—N/a
17	Abu Jayed	Bangladesh	Right-handed	Right-arm fast-medium	—N/a
98	Mehedi Hasan Rana	Bangladesh	Left-handed	Left-arm fast	—N/a
24	Rejaur Rahman Raja	Bangladesh	Right-handed	Right-arm medium fast	—N/a
11	Musfik Hasan	Bangladesh	Right-handed	Right-arm medium	—N/a
150	Ihsanullah Khan	Pakistan	Right-handed	Right-arm fast	Overseas
22	Bilal Sami	Afghanistan	Right-handed	Right-arm medium	Overseas
33	Ibrar Ahmad	United Arab Emirates	Right-handed	Right-arm medium fast	Overseas

== League stage ==
=== Points Table ===
Pos	Team	Pld	W	L	NR	Pts	NRR	Qualification
1	Rajshahi Warriors (C)	10	8	2	0	16	0.335	Advanced to Qualifier 1
2	Chattogram Royals (R)	10	6	4	0	12	0.497	Advanced to Qualifier 1
3	Rangpur Riders (4th)	10	6	4	0	12	0.220	Advanced to Eliminator
4	Sylhet Titans (3rd)	10	5	5	0	10	0.373	Advanced to Eliminator
5	Dhaka Capitals	10	3	7	0	6	−0.381	Eliminated
6	Noakhali Express	10	2	8	0	4	−1.038	Eliminated

Source: ESPNcricinfo & Cricbuzz
(C) Champions; (R) Runners up

=== Win-loss table ===
Team	1	2	3	4	5	6	7	8	9	10	Q1	El	Q2	F	Pos.
Noakhali Express	Chattogram; 65 runs	Sylhet; 1 wicket	Rajshahi; 6 wickets	Sylhet; 6 wickets	Dhaka; 7 wickets	Rajshahi; 4 wickets	Rangpur; 9 runs	Dhaka; 41 runs	Chattogram; 5 wickets	Rangpur; 8 wickets	—N/a				6th

Team's results→	Won	Tied	Lost	N/R

=== Matches ===
Match 2
26 December 2025
19:45 (N)
Scorecard

Chattogram Royals; 174/6 (20 overs)	v	Noakhali Express; 109 (16.5 overs)
Mirza Tahir Baig 80 (69); Sabbir Hossain 2/9 (1 over)		Maaz Sadaqat 38 (27); Tanvir Islam 3/39 (4 overs)

Chattogram Royals won by 65 runs
Sylhet International Cricket Stadium, Sylhet
Umpires: Masudur Rahman (Ban) and Asif Yaqoob (Pak)
Player of the match: Mirza Tahir Baig (Chattogram Royals)

- Chattogram Royals won the toss and elected to bat.
- This was the first match of the BPL for Noakhali Express.

Match 4
27 December 2025
18:00 (N)
Scorecard

Noakhali Express; 143/7 (20 overs)	v	Sylhet Titans; 144/9 (20 overs)
Mahidul Islam Ankon 61* (51); Khaled Ahmed 4/23 (4 overs)		Parvez Hossain Emon 60 (41); Mehedi Hasan Rana 4/34 (4 overs)

Sylhet Titans won by 1 wicket
Sylhet International Cricket Stadium, Sylhet
Umpires: Muhammad Kamruzzaman (Ban) and Asif Yaqoob (Pak)
Player of the match: Khaled Ahmed (Sylhet Titans)

- Sylhet Titans won the toss and elected to field.
- Mehedi Hasan Rana (Noakhali Express) took his first hat-trick in T20s, overall ninth in BPL and the first in this season.

Match 6
29 December 2025
18:00 (N)
Scorecard

Noakhali Express; 124/8 (20 overs)	v	Rajshahi Warriors; 125/4 (17.5 overs)
Haider Ali 33 (28); Ripon Mondol 4/13 (4 overs)		Tanzid Hasan 29 (20); Hasan Mahmud 2/19 (4 overs)

Rajshahi Warriors won by 6 wickets
Sylhet International Cricket Stadium, Sylhet
Umpires: Ali Arman (Ban) and Sharfuddoula (Ban)
Player of the match: Ripon Mondol (Rajshahi Warriors)

- Rajshahi Warriors won the toss and elected to field.
- Haider Ali started captaining Noakhali Express from this match as their previously selected captain Shykat Ali didn't feature.

Match 13
5 January 2026
13:00
Scorecard

Noakhali Express; 61 (14.2 overs)	v	Sylhet Titans; 62/4 (8.4 overs)
Mahidul Islam Ankon 25 (32); Nasum Ahmed 5/7 (4 overs)		Tawfique Khan 32 (18); Zahir Khan 3/8 (1.4 overs)

Sylhet Titans won by 6 wickets
Sylhet International Cricket Stadium, Sylhet
Umpires: Ruchira Palliyaguruge (SL) and Sharfuddoula (Ban)
Player of the match: Nasum Ahmed (Sylhet Titans)

- Noakhali Express won the toss and elected to bat.

Match 15
7 January 2026
13:00
Scorecard

Noakhali Express; 133/6 (20 overs)	v	Dhaka Capitals; 134/3 (14.1 overs)
Haider Ali 47 (36); Abdullah Al Mamun 1/6 (1 over)		Nasir Hossain 90* (50); Hasan Mahmud 2/17 (3 overs)

Dhaka Capitals won by 7 wickets
Sylhet International Cricket Stadium, Sylhet
Umpires: Ruchira Palliyaguruge (SL) and Sajedul Islam (Ban)
Player of the match: Nasir Hossain (Dhaka Capitals)

- Dhaka Capitals won the toss and elected to field.

Match 17
8 January 2026
13:00
Scorecard

Noakhali Express; 151/5 (20 overs)	v	Rajshahi Warriors; 152/6 (19 overs)
Soumya Sarkar 59 (43); Ripon Mondol 2/27 (4 overs)		Muhammad Waseem 60 (35); Mehedi Hasan Rana 3/25 (4 overs)

Rajshahi Warriors won by 4 wickets
Sylhet International Cricket Stadium, Sylhet
Umpires: Muhammad Kamruzzaman (Ban) and Sharfuddoula (Ban)
Player of the match: Muhammad Waseem (Rajshahi Warriors)

- Rajshahi Warriors won the toss and elected to field.

Match 20
9 January 2026
19:00 (N)
Scorecard

Noakhali Express; 148 (19.5 overs)	v	Rangpur Riders; 139/9 (20 overs)
Jaker Ali 38 (37); Mustafizur Rahman 3/18 (4 overs)		Iftikhar Ahmed 37 (31); Hasan Mahmud 4/26 (4 overs)

Noakhali Express won by 9 runs
Sylhet International Cricket Stadium, Sylhet
Umpires: Asif Yaqoob (Pak) and Tanvir Ahmed (Ban)
Player of the match: Hasan Mahmud (Noakhali Express)

- Rangpur Riders won the toss and elected to field.
- Mrittunjoy Chowdhury (Rangpur Riders) took the second hat-trick in his BPL career, overall tenth in BPL and the second in this season. He became the first player to take hat-trick multiple times in BPL history.

Match 22
11 January 2026
18:00 (N)
Scorecard

Noakhali Express; 184/7 (20 overs)	v	Dhaka Capitals; 143 (18.2 overs)
Hassan Eisakhil 92 (60); Mohammad Saifuddin 2/23 (3 overs)		Mohammad Saifuddin 34 (20); Hasan Mahmud 2/21 (3.2 overs)

Noakhali Express won by 41 runs
Sylhet International Cricket Stadium, Sylhet
Umpires: Morshed Ali Khan (Ban) and Asif Yaqoob (Pak)
Player of the match: Hassan Eisakhil (Noakhali Express)

- Noakhali Express won the toss and elected to bat.
- Hassan Eisakhil (Noakhali Express) made his BPL debut.

Match 25
16 January 2026 (Note: Match rescheduled due to local cricketers' boycott.)
14:00
Scorecard

Noakhali Express; 126 (18.5 overs)	v	Chattogram Royals; 128/5 (17 overs)
Hassan Eisakhil 25 (20); Shoriful Islam 5/9 (3.5 overs)		Mahedi Hasan 49* (36); Ihsanullah 2/23 (4 overs)

Chattogram Royals won by 5 wickets
Sher-e-Bangla National Cricket Stadium, Dhaka
Umpires: Asif Yaqoob (Pak) and Tanvir Ahmed (Ban)
Player of the match: Shoriful Islam (Chattogram Royals)

- Chattogram Royals won the toss and elected to field.

Match 29
18 January 2026
13:00
Scorecard

Noakhali Express; 173/2 (20 overs)	v	Rangpur Riders; 174/2 (19.4 overs)
Hassan Eisakhil 107* (72); Aliss Islam 1/22 (4 overs)		Tawhid Hridoy 109 (63); Hasan Mahmud 1/23 (4 overs)

Rangpur Riders won by 8 wickets
Sher-e-Bangla National Cricket Stadium, Dhaka
Umpires: Ali Arman (Ban) and Ruchira Palliyaguruge (SL)
Player of the match: Tawhid Hridoy (Rangpur Riders)

- Rangpur Riders won the toss and elected to field.

== See also ==
- 2025–26 Chattogram Royals season
- 2025–26 Dhaka Capitals season
- 2025–26 Rajshahi Warriors season
- 2025–26 Rangpur Riders season
- 2025–26 Sylhet Titans season
