= 2024–25 National Cricket League =

Bangladeshi cricket tournament

2024 National Cricket League
- Dates: 19 October 2024 – 3 December 2024
- Administrator: BCB
- Cricket format: First-class cricket
- Tournament format: Round-robin
- Host: Bangladesh
- Champions: Sylhet Division (1st title)
- Participants: 8
- Matches: 28
- Player of the series: Amite Hasan (Sylhet Division)
- Most runs: Amite Hasan (785) (Sylhet Division)
- Most wickets: Anamul Haque (36) (Dhaka Division)
- Official website: NCL 2024-25

The 2024–25 National Cricket League, also known as Modhumoti Bank NCL for sponsorship reasons, is the 26th edition of the National Cricket League, a first-class cricket competition in Bangladesh. Unlike previous seasons, there was no two-tier system – all eight teams played every other team. Dhaka Division was the previous season's champion. The tournament was scheduled to begin on 14 October 2024, but the Bangladesh Cricket Board's (BCB) tournament committee ruled that rain had rendered several stadiums, including those in Bogra and Khulna, unsuitable for play. As a result, the first round began on 19 October, and instead of concluding on 28 November, the tournament ended with the final round which began on 30 November. Afterwards, the 2024–25 National Cricket League Twenty20 series was scheduled to run from 11 December to 23 December.

Sylhet Division clinched their maiden NCL title with victory in the second-last round, while Dhaka Metro finished in second position.

== Venues ==
Locations of all stadiums which have hosted 2024-25 National Cricket League

Bogra	Chittagong	Cox's Bazar	Dhaka
Shaheed Chandu Stadium	Zohur Ahmed Chowdhury Stadium	Sheikh Kamal International Stadium	Sher-e-Bangla National Cricket Stadium
Capacity: 15,000	Capacity: 22,000	Capacity: 7,800	Capacity: 26,000
	Zahur Ahmed Chowdhury Stadium		Sher-e-Bangla National Cricket Stadium
Matches:	Matches:	Matches:	Matches:
Khulna	Rajshahi	Sylhet	Sylhet
Sheikh Abu Naser Stadium	Shaheed Qamaruzzaman Stadium	Sylhet International Cricket Stadium	SICS Academy Ground
Capacity: 15,000	Capacity: 15,000	Capacity: 18,500	
	Shaheed Qamaruzzaman Stadium	Sylhet International Cricket Stadium	
Matches:	Matches:	Matches:	Matches:

== Squads ==
As of 14 October 2024

Barisal Division	Chittagong Division	Dhaka Division	Dhaka Metropolis
Abu Sayem Chowdhury; Islamul Ahsan Abir; Md Hafizur Rahman; Mohammad Ashraful; Moinul Islam; Monir Hossain; Ruyel Miah; Sharear Sakib; Tanvir Islam; Fazle Mahmud Rabbi; Kamrul Islam Rabbi; MD Nuruzzaman; Mohammad Salman Hossain Emon; Mojammel Hasan; Shahin Alam; Shochi Chowdhury; Zakaria Masud; Iftakhar Hossain Ifti; Manik; Md. Shamsul Islam Anik; Moin Khan; Mojammel Hasan Shakil; Rafsan Al Mahmud; Shahriar Sakib; Sohag Gazi	Ahmed Sharif; Hasan Mahmud; Iftekhar Sajjad; MD Ifran Hossain; Mehedi Hasan; Mohiul Islam Patwary; Nayeem Hasan; Pinak Ghosh; Mohammad Saifuddin; Shakhawat Hossain; Tamim Iqbal; Yeasin Arafat; Enamul Hoque Ashiq; Hasan Murad; Irfan Shukkur; Md Jasim Uddin; Mehedi Hasan Rana; Mominul Haque; Noman Chowdhury; Rony Chowdhury; Sazzadul Hoque Ripon; Shamim Hossain; Tasamul Haque; Fahad Hossian; Hossain Shahadat Dipu; Mahmudul Hasan Joy; Md Sabbir Hossen Shikder; Minhazul Abedin Afridi; Nabil Samad; Parvez Hossain Emon; Sadikur Rahman; Shahin Alam; Shykat Ali; Yasir Ali	Mosaddek Hossain; Abdul Mazid; Mahidul Islam Ankon; Mohammad Hossain Ali; Ripon Mondol; Saif Hassan; Shuvagata Hom; Taufiq Ahmed; Arafat Sunny Jr; MD Anamul Haque; Nadif Chowdhury; Rony Talukdar; Salauddin Sakil; Sumon Khan; Joyraj Sheikh; Md Raqibul Hasan Nayon; Nazmul Islam Apu; Rubel Mia; Shahbaz Chouhan; Taibur Rahman	Abu Hider; Aminul Islam Biplob; Arif Ahmed; Asadullah Hill Galib; Kazi Anik Islam; Marshall Ayub; MD Sharifullah; Munim Shahriar; Qazi Onik Islam; Rayan Rafsan Rahman; Shamsur Rahman; Aich Mollah; Anisul Islam; Arif Ahmed; Azmir Ahmed; Mahfijul Islam; Md Al Amin Jr; Mehrab Hossain Johsy; Naeem Islam; Rakibul Hasan (SLAO); Shadman Islam; Shohidul Islam; AKS Swadhin; Arafat Sunny; Asadulla Al Galib; Iftekhar Sajjad; Manik Khan; Md Asif Hasan; Minhajul Abedin Sabbir; Naim Sheikh; Rakin Ahmed; Shahbaz Chouhan; Zahiduzzaman Khan; Ashraful Islam Siam
Khulna Division	Rajshahi Division	Rangpur Division	Sylhet Division
Abdul Halim; Amit Majumder; Imranuzzaman; Jibon; Md Ashiqur Zaman; Md Prantik Nawrose Nabil; MD. Hasanuzzaman; Nahidul Islam; Sheikh Mahedi Hasan; Tushar Imran; Afif Hossain Dhrubo; Anamul Bijoy; Imrul Kayes; Masum Khan Tutul; Md Mithun; Md Raihan Uddin; Mehidy Hassan Miraz; Quazi Nurul Hasan Sohan; Soumya Sarkar; Ziaur Rahman; Al Amin Hossain; Fardin Hasan Oni; Jawad Royen; MD Aridul Islam Akash; Md Moinul Islam Sohail; Md Salman Hossain; Mrittunjoy Chowdhury; Robiul Islam Robi; Tipu Sultan	Asaduzzaman Payel; Farhad Reza; Jahurul Islam; Md. Shahadot Hossain Sobuj; Mohor Sheikh; Nahid Rana; Pritom Kumar; Saklain Sajib; Shakhir Hossain Shuvro; Taijul Islam; Avishek Mitra; Habibur Rahman; Junaid Siddique; Mizanur Rahman; Muktar Ali; Najmul Hossain Shanto; Ridoy Islam; Shabbir Rahaman Roman; SM Meherob Hasan; Tanzid Hasan Tamim; Farhad Hossain; Imranuzzaman; Md Ashik Ul Alam Naem; Mohaiminul Khan; Mushfiqur Rahim; Nihad Uz Zaman; Sabbir Hosan; Shafiqul Islam; Sunzamul Islam; Tawhid Hridoy	Abdul Gaffar Saqlain; Akbar Ali; Ariful Haque; Dhiman Ghosh; Liton Kumar Das; Md Mushfik Hasan; Mehedi Maruf; Naeem Islam; Nobin Islam; Robiul Islam Robi; Shakil Hossain; Abdullah Al Mamun; Alauddin Babu; Asadulla Al Galib; Islam Mukidul Mugdho; Mahmudul Hasan; MD Sohel Rana; Mim Mosaddeak; Nasir Hossain; Rishad Hossain; Sanjit Saha; Shohel Rana; Abdur Rahman Rony; Anik Sarker; Asadullah Hill Galib; Jahid Javed; Md Abu Hasim; Md Sohrawordi Shuvo; Myshukur Rahman; Nihad Uz Zaman; Robiul Hoque; Shahin Alam; Tanbir Hayder	Abu Bokkor Ahmed; Ahmed Sharif; Asadulla Al Galib; Imtiaz Hossain; Md Al Amin Jr; Nabil Samad; Rahatul Ferdous; Shahanur Rahman; Sofor Ali; Taufiq Khan Tushar; Zakir Hasan; Abu Jayed Rahi; Alok Kapali; Ebadot Hossain; Jaker Ali Anik; MD Mizanur Rahman Sayem; Nasum Ahmed; Rahman Rejaur Raja; Shamsur Rahman Shuvo; Syed Khaled Ahmed; Tawhidul Islam; Ahmed Abidul Hoque; Amite Hasan; Enamul Haque Jr; Jaynul Islam; Mohiuddin Tareq; Nayeem Ahmed; Sayem Alam; Shanaj Ahmed; Tanzim Hasan Sakib; Towhid Hussain Ferdous

== Points table ==
Pos	Team	Pld	W	D	L	Pts
1	Sylhet Division (C)	7	4	2	1	10
2	Dhaka Metropolis	7	3	2	2	8
3	Dhaka Division	7	2	4	1	8
4	Rangpur Division	7	2	4	1	8
5	Khulna Division	7	2	4	1	8
6	Rajshahi Division	7	2	1	4	5
7	Chittagong Division	7	2	1	4	5
8	Barisal Division	7	1	2	4	4

Source: ESPNCricinfo & Cricheroes
(C) Champion

== Match Summary ==
Below is a summary of results for each team's seven regular season matches in chronological order. A team's opponent for any given match is listed above the margin of victory/defeat.

Team	League Stage							
Team	1	2	3	4	5	6	7	Pos
Barisal (BAR)	DHM; 8 wickets	KHU draw	RAJ; 6 wickets	CTG; 8 wickets	RNG draw	SYL; 5 wickets	DHK; 122 runs	8th
Chittagong (CTG)	RNG; 81 runs	SYL; 6 wickets	DHK draw	BAR; 8 wickets	RAJ; 9 wickets	KHU; 58 runs	DHM; 5 wickets	7th
Dhaka (DHK)	SYL draw	RNG draw	CTG draw	DHM draw	KHU; 9 wickets	RAJ innings & 11 runs	BAR; 122 runs	3rd place, bronze medalist(s)
Dhaka-M (DHM)	BAR; 8 wickets	RAJ; 10 wickets	KHU; 9 wickets	DHK draw	SYL innings & 139 runs	RNG draw	CTG; 5 wickets	2nd place, silver medalist(s)
Khulna (KHU)	RAJ draw	BAR draw	DHM; 9 wickets	SYL draw	DHK; 9 wickets	CTG; 58 runs	RNG draw	5th
Rajshahi (RAJ)	KHU draw	DHM; 10 wickets	BAR; 6 wickets	RNG; 101 runs	CTG; 9 wickets	DHK innings & 11 runs	SYL; 54 runs	6th
RAN (RNG)	CTG; 81 runs	DHK draw	SYL; 4 wickets	RAJ; 101 runs	BAR daw	DHM draw	KHU draw	4th
Sylhet (SYL)	DHK draw	CTG; 6 wickets	RNG; 4 wickets	KHU draw	DHM innings & 139 runs	BAR; 5 wickets	RAJ; 54 runs	1st place, gold medalist(s)

Team's results→	Won	Draw	Lost	N/R

== Fixture ==
=== Round 1 ===
19–22 October 2024
Match 1
Scorecard

Sylhet Division	v	Dhaka Division
146 (48.4 overs); Tanzim Hasan Sakib 42 (57); Nazmul Islam Apu 3/23 (9.4 overs)		224 (77.1 overs); Mahidul Islam Ankon 118 (233); Khaled Ahmed 4/61 (17.1 overs)
257/8 (106.2 overs); Pinak Ghosh 62 (160); Nazmul Islam Apu 4/88 (38.2 overs)

Drawn.
Sheikh Abu Naser Stadium, Khulna
Umpires: Tanvir Ahmed & Md. Asadur Rahman
Player of the match: Mahidul Islam Ankon (Dhaka Division)

- Dhaka Division won the toss and elected to field first.
- no play was possible on Day 1 due to rain and wet outfield.
- Ariful Islam & Ashiqur Rahman Shibli made their First-Class Cricket debut.

19–22 October 2024
Match 2
Scorecard

Rangpur Division	v	Chittagong Division
273/9d (58 overs); Khalid Hasan 60 (116); Fahad Hossain 4/62 (16.3 overs)		103 (37.5 overs); Saddam Hossain 34 (50); Chowdhury Md Rizwan 2/1 (4 overs)
		89 (32.1 overs) (f/o); Yeasin Arafat 26 (23); Abdullah Al Mamun 3/10 (8 overs)

Rangpur Division won by an innings and 81 runs
Shaheed Chandu Stadium, Bogra
Umpires: Mahfuzur Rahman Litu & Moniruzzaman Tinku
Player of the match: Chowdhury Md Rizwan (Rangpur Division)

- Chittagong Division won the toss and elected to field first.
- no play was possible on Day 1 due to rain and wet outfield.
- Ashraful Hasan Rohan, Chowdhury Md Rizwan, Khalid Hasan & Saddam Hossain made their First-Class Cricket debut.

19–22 October 2024
Match 3
Scorecard

Dhaka Metro	v	Barisal Division
408/5d (125.2 overs); Marshall Ayub 127 (199); Kamrul Islam Rabbi 2/64 (9.2 overs)		219 (77.5 overs); Ifteakhar Hossain Ifti 98 (177); Ashraful Islam Siam 5/73 (19.5 overs)
63/2 (15.4 overs); Shamsur Rahman Shuvo 15* (10); Tanvir Islam 1/13 (6 overs)		251 (87.1 overs) (f/o); Tasamul Haque 62 (107); Shohidul Islam 3/47 (16)

Dhaka Metro won by 7 wickets
SICS Academy Ground, Sylhet
Umpires: Ali Arman & Kamruzzaman
Player of the match: Ashraful Islam Siam (Dhaka Metro)

- Barisal Division won the toss and elected to field first
- Ashraful Islam Siam made his First-Class Cricket debut.

19–22 October 2024
Match 4
Scorecard

Rajshahi Division	v	Khulna Division
426 (105.5 overs); Tanzid Hasan 141 (133); Al-Amin Hossain 5/96 (20 overs)		194 (61.2 overs); Ziaur Rahman Zia 54 (53); SM Meherob Hossain 6/35 (11.2 over)
283/6d (50 overs); Sabbir Hossain 150 (139); Nahidul Islam 2/61 (12 overs		311/7 (123 overs); Soumya Sarkar 89 (116); Sunzamul Islam 3/66 (28 overs)

Drawn.
Sylhet International Cricket Stadium, Sylhet
Umpires: Syed Mozahiduzzaman Swapan & Shafiuddin Ahmed Babu
Player of the match: Sabbir Hossain (Rajshahi Division)

- Khulna Division won the toss and elected to field first
- Sheikh Parvez Jibon made his First-Class Cricket debut.

=== Round 2 ===
26–29 October 2024
Match 5
Scorecard

Rangpur Division	v	Dhaka Division
253 (74.3 overs); Abdullah Al Mamun 68 (88); Nazmul Islam Apu 4/78 (20.3 overs)		327 (90.3 overs); Ashiqur Rahman Shibli 129 (186); Mukidul Islam 3/28 (13.3)
165 (101 overs); Naeem Islam 75 (246); Anamul Haque 2/15 (15 overs)

Drawn.
BKSP 3 no. Ground, Savar
Umpires: Mahfurzur Rahman and Shafiuddin Ahmed
Player of the match: Ashiqur Rahman Shibli (Dhaka Division)

- Dhaka Division won the toss and elected to field first
- no play was possible on Day 1 due to rain and wet outfield.
- Mahfuzur Rahman Rabby Made his First-class cricket debut.

26–29 October 2024
Match 6
scorecard

Chittagong Division	v	Sylhet
198 (45.2 overs); Yasir Ali 73 (91); Rejaur Rahman Raja 3/39 (11 overs)		152 (54.2 overs); Asadullah Al Galib 34 (98); Ifran Hossain 5/34 (14.2 overs)
173 (42.1 overs); Sajjadul Haque 42 (68); Rejaul Rahman Raja 3/34 (9 overs)		222/4 (40.1 overs); Pinak Ghosh 62* (81); Iftekhar Sajjad 2/13 (6 overs)

Sylhet Division won by 6 wickets.
Sylhet Outer Cricket Stadium, Sylhet
Umpires: Ali Arman and Moniruzzaman
Player of the match: Rejaur Rahman Raja

- Sylhet Division won the toss and elected to field first.

26–29 October 2024
Match 7
scorecard

Rajshahi Division	v	Dhaka Metro
77 (28.2 overs); Mohor Sheikh 19 (17); Maruf Mridha 6/22 (11.2 overs)		233 (81.2 overs); Shamsur Rahman 64 (165); Sunzamul Islam 3/56 (22 overs)
166 (37.5 overs); Sabbir Hossain 78 (56); Rakibul Hasan 8/56 (15.5 overs)		14/0 (2.1 overs); Anisul Islam Emon 13* (8)

Dhaka Metro won by 10 wickets
BKSP 4 no. Ground, Savar
Umpires: Masudur Rahman and Sajedul Islam
Player of the match: Rakibul Hasan (Dhaka Metro)

- Dhaka Metro won the toss and elected to field first

26–29 October 2024
Match 8
scorecard

Khulna Division	v	Barisal Division
408/9 (110.2 overs); Anamul Haque 95 (144); Tanvir Islam 4/124 (39.2 Overs)		287/3 (96 overs); Abdul Mazid 134* (255); Mahedi Hasan 1/61 (24 overs)

Drawn
Sheikh Abu Naser Stadium, Khulna
Umpires: Kamruzzaman and Moniruzzaman
Player of the match: Abdul Mazid (Barisal Division)

- Khulna Division won the toss and elected to bat first
- no play was possible on Day 1 due to rain and wet outfield.

=== Round 3 ===
02–05 November 2024
Match 9
Scorecard

Chittagong Division	v	Dhaka Division
371 (98 overs); Sajjadul Haque 139 (185); Shuvagata Hom 2/55 (17 overs)		401 (132.5 overs); Mahidul Islam Ankon 99 (155); Hasan Murad 3/105 (39 overs)
124/4 (32 overs); Parvez Hossain Emon 39 (40); Anamul Haque 2/17 (5 overs)

Drawn
SKIS Academy Ground
Umpires: Kamruzzaman Limon and Masudur Rahman
Player of the match: Sajjadul Haque (Chittagong Division)

- Dhaka Division won the toss and elected to field first
- '

02–05 November 2024
Match 10
Scorecard

Rangpur Division	v	Sylhet Division
158 (62.3 overs) Akbar Ali 37 (39) Abu Jayed Rahi 3/36 (13.3 overs)		189 (58.2 overs); Amite Hasan 57 (104); Abu Hasim 3/4 (8 overs)
220 (80.2 overs); Tanbir Hayder 72 (168); Rahatul Ferdous 3/38 (22.2 overs)		192/6 (65 overs); Rejaur Rahman Raja 59 (117); Mukidul Islam 3/55 (16.1 overs)

Sylhet Division won by 4 wickets
Shaheed Chandu Stadium, Bogra
Umpires: Barkhatulylah Turky and Kamruzzaman
Player of the match: Rejaur Rahman Raja (Sylhet Division)

- Sylhet Division won the toss and elected to field first

02–05 November 2024
Match 11
Scorecard

Khulna Division	v	Dhaka Metro
376 (93.1 overs); Amit Majumder 145 (234); Fahim Hasan 4/56 (16.1 overs)		210 (66.5 overs); Mohammad Naim 54 (105); Mahedi Hasan 5/62 (22.5 overs)
209/1 (35 overs); Imrul Kayes 83* (80); Aminul Islam 1/23 (3 overs)		372 (115.1 overs) (f/o); Marshall Ayub 152 (242); Mahedi Hasan 5/88 (37.1 overs)

Khulna Division won by 9 wickets
Sylhet International Cricket Stadium, Sylhet
Umpires: Asadur Rahman and Manjurul Islam
Player of the match: Mahedi Hasan (Khulna Division)

- Dhaka Metro won the toss and elected to field first

02–05 November 2024
Match 12
Scorecard

Barisal Division	v	Rajshahi Division
205 (72.4 overs); Iftakhar Hossain Ifti 116 (205); Ali Mohammad Walid 4/51 (14.4 overs)		275 (81.5 overs); Pritom Kumar 80 (149); Ruyel Miah 3/41 (14.5 overs )
137 (50.1 overs); Tasamul Haque 46 (61); Sunzamul Islam 6/40 (23.1 overs)		68/4 (15 overs); SM Meherob 23* (31); Kamrul Islam 2/12 (5 overs)

Rajshahi Division won by 6 wickets
Sheikh Kamal International Stadium, Cox's Bazar
Umpires: Morshed Ali Khan and Sajedul Islam
Player of the match: Sunzamul Islam (Rajshahi Division)

- Barisal Division won the toss and elected to bat first

=== Round 4 ===
09–12 November 2024
Match 13
Scorecard

Dhaka Metro	v	Dhaka Division
304 (108.5 overs); Shamsur Rahman 86 (209); Shuvagata Hom 4/62 (23.5 overs)		267 (98.1 overs); Aminul Islam 82 (138); Anamul Haque 6/81 (21 overs)
315 (78.3 overs); Shuvagata Hom 83 (98); Abu Hider 3/66 (15 overs)		148/8(43 overs); Ashiqur Rahman Shibli 34 (32); Rakibul Hasan 4/38 (18 overs)

Drawn
Sylhet Outer Cricket Stadium, Sylhet
Umpires: Ali Arman and Sharfoddoula
Player of the match: Anamul Haque (Dhaka Division)

- Dhaka Division won the toss and elected to field first

09–12 November 2024
Match 14
Scorecard

Sylhet Division	v	Khulna Division
496/7d (163.4 overs); Amite Hasan 213 (455); Mahedi Hasan 4/152 (61 overs)		273 (87.5 overs); Anamul Haque 88 (131); Nabil Samad 3/79 (24.5 overs)
		296/3 (75.5 overs) (f/o); Mohammad Mithun 102* (108); Tofael Ahmed 1/19 (6 overs)

Drawn.
SKIS Academy Ground, Cox's Bazar
Umpires: Habibur Rahman and Mahfuzur Rahman
Player of the match: Amite Hasan (Sylhet Division)

- Sylhet Division won the toss and elected to bat first

09–12 November 2024
Match 15
Scorecard

Rangpur Division	v	Rajshahi Division
189 (63.4 overs); Ariful Haque 103* (161); Sabbir Hossain 6/47 (15 overs)		189 (64.4 overs); Sabbir Hossain 47 (69); Chowdhury Md Rizwan 3/30 (9 overs)
262 (82.1 overs); Akbar Ali 77 (107); Mohor Sheikh 4/49 (19 overs)		161 (41.4 overs); Golam Kibria 56 (65); Ariful Haque 3/16 (7 overs)

Rangpur Division won by 101 runs
Shaheed Kamruzzaman Stadium, Rajshahi
Umpires: Shafeen Sharif and Tanvir Ahmed
Player of the match: Ariful Haque (Rangpur Division)

- Rajshahi Division won the toss and elected to field first

09–12 November 2024
Match 16
Scorecard

Barisal Division	v	Chittagong Division
318 (119.4 overs); Moin Khan 77 (154); Ashraful Hasan Rohan 4/68 (30.4 overs)		313 (90.4 overs); Shahadat Hossain Dipu 116 (249); Tanvir Islam 4/123 (32 overs)
77 (28.3 overs); Fazle Mahmud 33 (26); Ashraful Hasan Rohan 6/22 (8.3 overs)		83/2 (11.3 overs); Parvez Hossain Emon 46* (30); Sohag Gazi 1/10 (3 overs)

Chittagong Division won by 8 wickets
Sheikh Kamal International Stadium, Cox's Bazar
Umpires: Ishtiaq Ahmed and Moniruzzaman
Player of the match: Ashraful Haque Rohan (Chittagong Division)

- Barisal Division won the toss and elected to bat first

=== Round 5 ===
16–19 November 2024
Match 17
Scorecard

Khulna Division	v	Dhaka Division
172 48.4 overs); Mohammad Mithun 69 (94); Sumon Khan 6/50 (17.4 overs)		160 (61.2 overs); Ariful Haque 62 (166); Al-Amin Hossain 3/34 (20 overs)
91 (34.4 overs); Amit Majumdar 38* (69); Anamul Haque 4/17 (9 overs)		104/1 (17.2 overs); Rony Talukder 62* (54); Al-Amin Hossain 1/38 (6 overs)

Dhaka Division won by 9 wickets
Sher-e-Bangla National Cricket Stadium, Dhaka
Umpires: Masudur Rahman and Mohammad Kamruzzaman
Player of the match: Sumon Khan (Dhaka Division)

- Khulna Division won the toss and elected to bat first

16–19 November 2024
Match 18
Scorecard

Dhaka Metro	v	Sylhet Division
130 (43.1 overs); Mohammad Naim 31 (60); Nasum Ahmed 4/19 (9 overs)		376 (96.2 overs); Amite Hasan 101 (204); Arif Ahmed 4/77 (23 overs)
107 (33.4 overs); Marshal Ayub 34 (55); Khaled Ahmed 5/45 (11 overs)

Sylhet Division won by an innings and 139 runs
Sheikh Abu Naser Stadium, Khulna
Umpires: Sajedul Islam and Tanvir Ahmed
Player of the match: Amite Hasan (Sylhet Division)

- Sylhet Division won the toss and elected to field first

16–19 November 2024
Match 19
Scorecard

Barisal Division	v	Rangpur Division
336 (99.4 overs); Iftekhar Hossain Ifti 70 (145); Ariful Haque 2/21 (11 overs)		322 (109.2 overs); Abdullah Al Mamun 65 (135); Moin Khan 3/25 (11.2 overs)
358 (101.1 overs); Iftekhar Hossain Ifti 87 (161); Mukidul Islam 3/53 (19 overs)		24/0 (10 overs); Chowdhury MD Rizwan 14 (31)

Drawn.
Shaheed Kamruzzaman Stadium, Rajshahi
Umpires: Mahfuzur Rahman and Sohrab Hossain
Player of the match: Iftekhar Hossain Ifti (Barisal Division)

- Rangpur Division won the toss and elected to field first

16–19 November 2024
Match 20
Scorecard

Rajshahi Division	v	Chittagong Division
112 (34 overs); Golam Kibria 23 (35); Fahad Hossain 5/31 (9 overs)		252 (68.4 overs); Shamim Hossain 84 (128); Sabbir Hossain 3/31 (9 overs)
220 (62.4 overs); Sabbir Hossain 54 (71); Ahmed Sharif 5/55 (15)		83/1 (17.4 overs); Sadikur Rahman 46* (47); Sunzamul Islam 1/38 (7 overs)

Chittagong Division won by 9 wickets
Zohur Ahmed Chowdhury Stadium, Chittagong
Umpires: Morshed Ali Khan and Mozahiduzzaman
Player of the match: Ahmed Sharif (Chittagong Division)

- Chittagong Division won the toss and elected to field first

=== Round 6 ===
23–26 November 2024
Match 21
Scorecard

Rajshahi Division	v	Dhaka Division
42 (20.5 overs); SM Meherob 18 (25); Sumon Khan 7/18 (7.5 overs)		181 (42.2 overs); Jishan Alam 44 (42); Asaduzzaman Payel 4/31 (10.2 overs)
128 (30 overs); Tanzid Hasan 38 (52); Anamul Haque 5/54 (12 overs)

Dhaka Division won by an innings and 11 runs
Shaheed Chandu Stadium, Bogra
Umpires: Ali Arman and Manjurul Islam
Player of the match: Sumon Khan (Dhaka Division)

- Dhaka Division won the toss and elected to field first

23–26 November 2024
Match 22
Scorecard

Barisal Division	v	Sylhet Division
304 (93.2 overs); Abdul Mazid 78 (199); Rejaur Rahman Raja 5/69 (19.2 overs)		342 (102.2 overs); Tofael Ahmed 64 (84); Ruyel Miah 3/79 (22 overs)
142 (35.3 overs); Sohag Gazi 35 (34); Khaled Ahmed 4/18 (8 overs)		105/5 (27.3 overs); Nasum Ahmed 44 (52); Ruyel Miah 2/11 (5 overs)

Sylhet Division won by 5 wickets
Sylhet International Cricket Stadium, Sylhet
Umpires: Amit Majumdar and Morshed Ali Khan
Player of the match: Tofael Ahmed (Dhaka Division)

- Sylhet Division won the toss and elected to field first

23–26 November 2024
Match 23
Scorecard

Dhaka Metro	v	Rangpur Division
475 (141.3 overs); Mohammad Naim 180 (285); Ariful Haque 3/55 (19.3 overs)		301 (117.3); Naeem Islam 88 (205); Mehedi Hasan 3/64 (23 overs)
118 (48.1); Arif Ahmed 33 (81); Mehedi Hasan 7/25 (14 overs)

Drawn
Sheikh Kamal International Stadium, Cox's Bazar
Umpires: Barkatulylah Turkey and Gazi Sohel
Player of the match: Mohammad Naim (Dhaka Metro)

- Dhaka Metro won the toss and elected to bat first

23–26 November 2024
Match 24
Scorecard

Khulna Division	v	Chittagong Division
204 (74 overs); Amit Majumder 75 (199); Nayeem Hasan 5/48 (28 overs)		220 (64.1 overs); Parvez Hossain Emon 107 (139); Mahedi Hasan 5/65 (17.1 overs)
219 (57.3 overs); Anamul Haque 75 (115); Enamul Hoque Ashiq 4/54 (16 overs)		145 (39.4 overs); Irfan Sukkur 32 (44); Al-Amin Hossain 5/67 (17 overs)

Khulna Division won by 58 runs
SICS Academy Ground, Sylhet
Umpires: Moniruzzaman and Mozahiduzzaman
Player of the match: Mahedi Hasan (Khulna Division)

- Chittagong Division won the toss and elected to field first

=== Round 7 ===
30 Nov – 3 Dec 2024
Match 25
Scorecard

Barisal Division	v	Dhaka Division

Barisal Division won by 122 runs
Shaheed Chandu Stadium, Bogra
Player of the match: Ruyel Miah (Dhaka Division)

- Dhaka Division won the toss and elected to field first

30 Nov – 3 Dec 2024
Match 26
Scorecard

Rajshahi Division	v	Sylhet Division

Rajshahi Division won by 54 runs
Zahur Ahmed Chowdhury Stadium, Chittagong.
Player of the match: Nihaduzzaman (Rajshahi Division)

- Rajshahi Division won the toss and elected to bat first

30 Nov – 3 Dec 2024
Match 27
Scorecard

Khulna Division	v	Rangpur Division

Drawn.
Sheikh Abu Naser Stadium, Khulna.
Player of the match: Mehedi Hasan Rana (Khulna Division)

- Rangpur Division won the toss and elected to field first

30 Nov – 3 Dec 2024
Match 28
Scorecard

Chittagong Division	v	Dhaka Metro Division

Dhaka Metro won by 5 wickets.
Shaheed Kamruzzaman Stadium, Rajshahi
Player of the match: Arif Ahmed (Dhaka Metro)

- Chittagong Division won the toss and elected to bat first

== Statistics ==
Most Runs			Most Wickets		
Batter	Inns	Runs	Bowler	Inns	Wkts
Amite Hasan (SYL)	12	785	Anamul Haque (DHK)	14	36
Anamul Haque (KHU)	13	700	Ashraful Hasan Rohan (CTG)	11	28
Amit Majumder (KHU)	13	587	Ruyel Miah (BAR)	12	25
Last updated: 3 December 2024. Source: ESPNCricinfo
