= List of Bangladesh Premier League centuries =

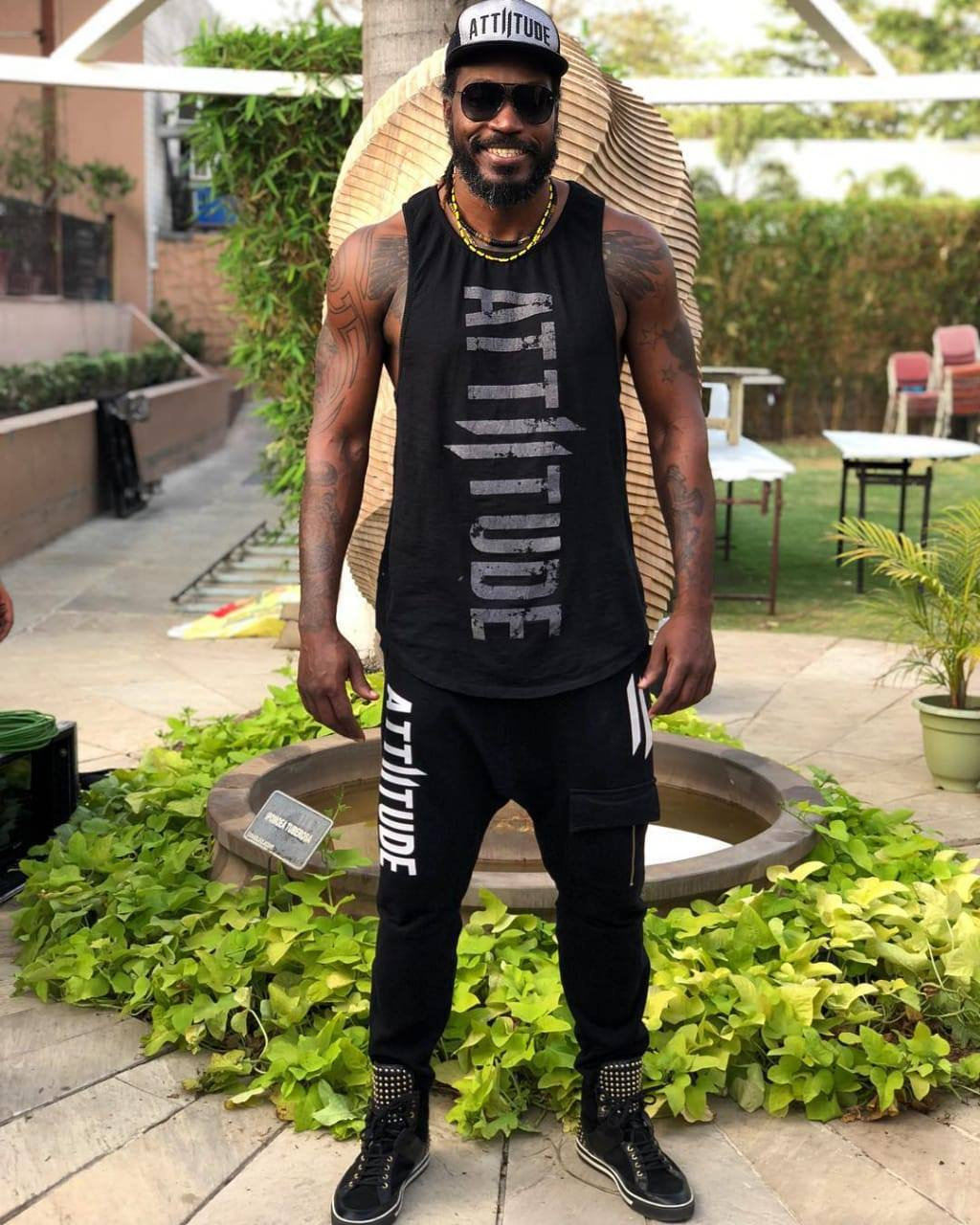
Chris Gayle holds the record of scoring most number of centuries (5) in BPL

In cricket, a batsman reaches a century when he scores 100 or more runs in a single innings. A century is regarded as a landmark score for a batsman, and his number of centuries is generally recorded in his career statistics. The Bangladesh Premier League (BPL) is a professional Twenty20 cricket league in Bangladesh which has been held annually since its first season in 2012. Though Following the match fixing scandal, the league was not played in the year 2014. It started again at year 2015, the third season of this tournament. In the ten seasons played, thirty centuries have been made by twenty four different players.

The first century in the BPL was scored in the first match on 10 February 2012 at Sher-e-Bangla National Cricket Stadium, Dhaka by Chris Gayle for Barisal Burners against Sylhet Royals. The highest score in the competition was made by Chris Gayle, who scored 146 runs not out for Rangpur Riders against Dhaka Dynamites. The fastest century in terms of balls was scored by Chris Gayle, who scored 126 runs not out in 51 balls while playing for Ranhpur Riders. The slowest century was scored by Dwayne Smith for Khulna Royal Bengal against Sylhet Royals. He scored his century in 70 balls while his final score was 103 runs not out in 73 balls at a strike rate of 141.09.

The highest number of centuries have been scored by Chris Gayle with five centuries.

Among the thirty seven centuries only ten of them are made by the player of the hosting country. Twenty seven centuries has been scored by the foreigner players with twelve from West Indies players.

Mohammad Ashraful, Shahriar Nafees and Faf du Plessis are the only players to score a century while captaining their team. Ashraful was the captain of Dhaka Gladiators side while Nafees was the captain of Khulna Royal Bengal and Faf du Plessis captaining Comilla Victorians.

2025 BPL, also known as BPL11 has seen the most number of centuries till now. Eight centuries have been scored on this season so far. While 2015 and 2016 has the lowest number of centuries with one each.

== Key ==
Symbol	Meaning
*	Remained not out
†	player was selected Man of the Match
Balls	Balls faced during the innings
4s	Number of fours hit by the batsman
6s	Number of sixes hit by the batsman
S/R.	Strike rate during the innings
Inn.	The innings of the match
Won	The match was won by the team for which the player played
Lost	The match was lost by the team for which the player played

== Centuries ==
Bangladesh Premier League centuries
No.	Player	Score	Balls	4s	6s	S/R	Team	Opposition	Inn.	Venue	Date	Result
1	Chris Gayle † (1/5)	101*	44	7	10	229.54	Barisal Burners	Sylhet Royals	2	Sher-e-Bangla National Cricket Stadium, Dhaka	10 February 2012	Won
2	Chris Gayle (2/5)	116	61	6	11	190.16	Barisal Burners	Dhaka Gladiators	2	Sher-e-Bangla National Cricket Stadium, Dhaka	14 February 2012	Lost
3	Dwayne Smith	103*	73	6	6	141.09	Khulna Royal Bengals	Sylhet Royals	1	Sher-e-Bangla National Cricket Stadium, Dhaka	27 February 2012	Won
4	Ahmed Shehzad†	113*	49	12	6	230.61	Barisal Burners	Duronto Rajshahi	2	Sher-e-Bangla National Cricket Stadium, Dhaka	28 February 2012	Won
5	Shahriar Nafees †	102*	69	12	2	147.82	Khulna Royal Bengal	Duronto Rajshahi	1	Sheikh Abu Naser Stadium, Khulna	24 January 2013	Won
6	Mohammad Ashraful †	103*	58	14	2	177.58	Dhaka Gladiators	Khulna Royal Bengals	2	Sher-e-Bangla National Cricket Stadium, Dhaka	11 February 2013	Won
7	Chris Gayle † (3/5)	114	51	5	12	223.52	Dhaka Gladiators	Sylhet Royals	1	Sher-e-Bangla National Cricket Stadium, Dhaka	15 February 2013	Won
8	Evin Lewis † (1/2)	101*	65	7	6	155.38	Barisal Bulls	Dhaka Dynamites	2	Zohur Ahmed Chowdhury Stadium, Chittagong	1 December 2015	Won
9	Sabbir Rahman †	122	61	9	9	200.00	Rajshahi Kings	Barisal Bulls	2	Sher-e-Bangla National Cricket Stadium, Dhaka	13 November 2016	Lost
10	Chris Gayle † (4/5)	126*	51	6	14	247.05	Rangpur Riders	Khulna Titans	2	Sher-e-Bangla National Cricket Stadium, Dhaka	8 December 2017	Won
11	Johnson Charles †(1/2)	105*	63	9	7	166.66	Rangpur Riders	Comilla Victorians	1	Sher-e-Bangla National Cricket Stadium, Dhaka	10 December 2017	Won
12	Chris Gayle † (5/5)	146*	69	5	18	211.59	Rangpur Riders	Dhaka Dynamites	1	Sher-e-Bangla National Cricket Stadium, Dhaka	12 December 2017	Won
13	Laurie Evans †	104*	62	9	6	167.74	Rajshahi Kings	Comilla Victorians	1	Sher-e-Bangla National Cricket Stadium, Dhaka	21 January 2019	Won
14	Alex Hales † (1/2)	100	48	11	5	208.33	Rangpur Riders	Chittagong Vikings	1	Zohur Ahmed Chowdhury Stadium, Chittagong	25 January 2019	Won
15	Rilee Rossouw	100*	51	8	6	196.07	Rangpur Riders	Chittagong Vikings	1	Zohur Ahmed Chowdhury Stadium, Chittagong	25 January 2019	Won
16	Evin Lewis † (2/2)	109*	49	5	10	222.44	Comilla Victorians	Khulna Titans	1	Zohur Ahmed Chowdhury Stadium, Chittagong	28 January 2019	Won
17	AB de Villiers †	100*	50	8	6	200.00	Rangpur Riders	Dhaka Dynamites	2	Zohur Ahmed Chowdhury Stadium, Chittagong	28 January 2019	Won
18	Tamim Iqbal † (1/2)	141*	61	10	11	231.14	Comilla Victorians	Dhaka Dynamites	1	Sher-e-Bangla National Cricket Stadium, Dhaka	8 February 2019	Won
19	Andre Fletcher † (1/2)	103*	57	11	5	180.70	Sylhet Thunder	Khulna Tigers	1	Zohur Ahmed Chowdhury Stadium, Chittagong	21 December 2019	Won
20	Dawid Malan †	100*	54	9	5	185.18	Cumilla Warriors	Rajshahi Royals	1	Zohur Ahmed Chowdhury Stadium, Chittagong	24 December 2019	Lost
21	Najmul Hossain Shanto † (1/2)	115*	57	8	7	201.75	Khulna Tigers	Dhaka Platoon	2	Sher-e-Bangla National Cricket Stadium, Dhaka	11 January 2020	Won
22	Lendl Simmons	116	65	14	5	178.46	Sylhet Sunrisers	Minister Dhaka	1	Zohur Ahmed Chowdhury Stadium, Chittagong	28 January 2022	Lost
23	Tamim Iqbal † (2/2)	111*	64	17	4	173.43	Minister Dhaka	Sylhet Sunrisers	2	Zohur Ahmed Chowdhury Stadium, Chittagong	28 January 2022	Won
24	Faf du Plessis	101	54	12	3	187.03	Comilla Victorians	Khulna Tigers	1	Sher-e-Bangla National Cricket Stadium, Dhaka	12 February 2022	Lost
25	Andre Fletcher † (2/2)	101*	62	6	6	162.90	Khulna Tigers	Comilla Victorians	2	Sher-e-Bangla National Cricket Stadium, Dhaka	12 February 2022	Won
26	Azam Khan	109*	58	9	8	187.93	Khulna Tigers	Chattogram Challengers	1	Sher-e-Bangla National Cricket Stadium, Dhaka	9 January 2023	Lost
27	Usman Khan (1/2)	103	58	10	5	177.59	Chattogram Challengers	Khulna Tigers	2	Sher-e-Bangla National Cricket Stadium, Dhaka	9 January 2023	Won
28	Iftikhar Ahmed	100*	45	6	9	222.22	Fortune Barishal	Rangpur Riders	1	Zohur Ahmed Chowdhury Stadium, Chattogram	19 January 2023	Won
29	Johnson Charles (2/2)	107*	56	5	11	197.07	Comilla Victorians	Khulna Tigers	2	Sylhet International Cricket Stadium, Sylhet	31 January 2023	Won
30	Towhid Hridoy	108*	57	8	7	189.47	Comilla Victorians	Durdanto Dhaka	2	Shere Bangla National Stadium, Dhaka	9 February 2024	Won
31	Will Jacks	108*	53	5	10	203.8	Comilla Victorians	Chattogram Challengers	2	Zohur Ahmed Chowdhury Stadium, Chattogram	13 February 2024	Won
32	Tanzid Hasan (1/2)	116	65	8	8	178.46	Chattogram Challengers	Khulna Tigers	1	Zohur Ahmed Chowdhury Stadium, Chattogram	20 February 2024	Won
33	Usman Khan (2/2)	123	62	13	6	198.38	Chittagong Kings	Durbar Rajshahi	1	Sher-e-Bangla National Cricket Stadium, Dhaka	3 January 2025	Won
34	Thisara Perera	103*	60	9	7	171.66	Dhaka Capitals	Khulna Tigers	2	Sher-e-Bangla National Cricket Stadium, Dhaka	3 January 2025	Lost
35	Alex Hales † (2/2)	113*	56	10	7	201.78	Rangpur Riders	Sylhet Strikers	2	Sylhet International Cricket Stadium, Sylhet	6 January 2025	Won
36	Litton Das †	125*	55	10	9	227.27	Dhaka Capitals	Durbar Rajshahi	1	Sylhet International Cricket Stadium, Sylhet	12 January 2025	Won
37	Tanzid Hasan (2/2)	108	64	6	8	168.75	Dhaka Capitals	Durbar Rajshahi	1	Sylhet International Cricket Stadium, Sylhet	12 January 2025	Won
38	Graham Clark †	101	50	7	6	202.00	Chittagong Kings	Khulna Tigers	1	Zohur Ahmed Chowdhury Stadium, Chattogram	16 January 2025	Won
39	Anamul Haque	100*	57	9	5	175.44	Durbar Rajshahi	Khulna Tigers	2	Zohur Ahmed Chowdhury Stadium, Chattogram	19 January 2025	Lost
40	Mohammad Naim	111*	62	7	8	179.03	Khulna Tigers	Rangpur Riders	1	Sher-e-Bangla National Cricket Stadium, Dhaka	30 January 2025	Won
41	Najmul Hossain Shanto † (2/2)	101*	60	10	5	168.33	Rajshahi Warriors	Sylhet Titans	2	Sylhet International Cricket Stadium, Sylhet	26 December 2025	Won
42	Hassan Eisakhil †	107	72	4	11	148.61	Noakhali Express	Rangpur Riders	1	Sher-e-Bangla National Cricket Stadium, Dhaka	18 January 2026	Lost
43	Towhid Hridoy † (2/2)	109	63	15	2	173.02	Rangpur Riders	Noakhali Express	2	Sher-e-Bangla National Cricket Stadium, Dhaka	18 January 2026	Won

== Season overview ==
Season wise statistics for century scores
Season	No. of centurions	No. of centuries	Highest score	Highest scorer
2012	3	4	116	Chris Gayle
2013	3	3	114	Chris Gayle
2015	1	1	101*	Evin Lewis
2016	1	1	122	Sabbir Rahman
2017	2	3	146*	Chris Gayle
2019	6	6	141*	Tamim Iqbal
2019–20	3	3	115*	Najmul Hossain Shanto
2022	4	4	116	Lendl Simmons
2022–23	4	4	109*	Azam Khan
2024	3	3	116	Tanzid Hasan
2025	8	8	125*	Litton Das
