= 2025–26 Bangladesh Premier League final =

Final match of the BPL 2025–26

2025–26 Bangladesh Premier League Final
- Event: 2025–26 Bangladesh Premier League
Rajshahi Warriors	Chattogram Royals
174/4	111
(20 overs)	(17.5 overs)
- Rajshahi Warriors won by 63 runs
- Date: 23 January 2026
- Venue: Sher-e-Bangla National Cricket Stadium, Dhaka
- Player of the match: Tanzid Hasan Tamim (Rajshahi Warriors)
- Umpires: Gazi Sohel (Ban) and Ruchira Palliyaguruge (SL)

The 2025–26 Bangladesh Premier League final played on 23 January 2026 at Sher-e-Bangla National Cricket Stadium in Dhaka. Chattogram Royals and Rajshahi Warriors featured in the final. The final match played at 18:00 local time.

== Pre-match ceremony ==
The Zirconium Diamond coated trophy of 2025–26 Bangladesh Premier League was brought to the stadium through helicopter. Besides, other cultural programs were arranged.

== Road to the final ==
=== Summary ===
Chattogram Royals

After the change of teams for the new season of BPL, Chattogram Royals started their season with big controversy as their ownership was changed just at the day before the start of the season. Triangle Sports, who previously was the owner this team, resigned from being owner leaving the team ownerless. Then Bangladesh Cricket Board took charge and changed all coaches of the team. Despite this huge controversy, this team managed to start their season with a win over Noakhali Express and also finished the season on a high being at the 2nd position in the points table. Then at the Qualifier 1 defeating Rajshahi Warriors by 6 wickets, they reached the final.

Rajshahi Warriors

Rajshahi Warriors were one of the teams who played the opening match of this season of BPL. They started their season strongly defeating Sylhet Titans in that match. At the end of the league stage they were at the top of the points table with the maximum 16 points among all. But unfortunately they got defeated by Chattogram Royals at the Qualifier 1. But making sure to defeat Sylhet Titans in the Qualifier 2 they reached the final.

=== Win-loss table ===
Team	1	2	3	4	5	6	7	8	9	10	Q1	El	Q2
Chattogram Royals	Noakhali; 65 runs	Rangpur; 7 wickets	Dhaka; 10 wickets	Sylhet; 9 wickets	Rangpur; 5 wickets	Sylhet; 14 runs	Rajshahi; 2 wickets	Noakhali; 5 wickets	Rajshahi; 3 wickets	Dhaka; 42 runs	Rajshahi; 6 wickets	—N/a	
Rajshahi Warriors	Sylhet; 8 wickets	Dhaka; 5 wickets	Noakhali; 6 wickets	Rangpur; Super Over	Noakhali; 4 wickets	Chattogram; 2 wickets	Rangpur; 7 wickets	Dhaka; 7 wickets	Sylhet; 5 runs	Chattogram; 3 wickets	Chattogram; 7 wickets	—N/a	Sylhet; 12 runs

Team's results→	Won	Tied	Lost	N/R

=== Bracket ===
Qualifier 1
20 January — Dhaka
1	Rajshahi Warriors	133 (20 overs)
2	Chattogram Royals	134/4 (19.3 overs)
Eliminator
20 January — Dhaka
3	Rangpur Riders	111/9 (20 overs)
4	Sylhet Titans	112/7 (20 overs)

Qualifier 2
21 January — Dhaka
Q1L	Rajshahi Warriors	165/9 (20 overs)
EW	Sylhet Titans	153/8 (20 overs)

Final
23 January — Dhaka
Q1W	Chattogram Royals	111 (17.5 overs)
Q2W	Rajshahi Warriors	174/4 (20 overs)

== Final ==
Match

Match 34
23 January 2026
18:00 (N)
Scorecard

Rajshahi Warriors; 174/4 (20 overs)	v	Chattogram Royals; 111 (17.5 overs)
Tanzid Hasan 100 (62); Mukidul Islam 2/20 (4 overs)		Mirza Tahir Baig 39 (36); Binura Fernando 4/9 (3 overs)

Rajshahi Warriors won by 63 runs
Sher-e-Bangla National Cricket Stadium, Dhaka
Umpires: Gazi Sohel (Ban) and Ruchira Palliyaguruge (SL)
Player of the match: Tanzid Hasan (Rajshahi Warriors)

- Chattogram Royals won the toss and elected to field.

=== Umpires ===
- On-field umpires : Gazi Sohel (Ban) and Ruchira Palliyaguruge (SL)
- TV umpire : Tanvir Ahmed (Ban)
- Reserve umpire : Morshed Ali Khan (Ban)
- Match referee : Simon Taufel (Aus)

=== Scorecard ===
Source:ESPNcricinfo

- Toss: Chattogram Royals won the toss and elected to field.

1st innings

Rajshahi Warriors batting
Player	Status	Runs	Balls	4s	6s	Strike rate
Sahibzada Farhan	c Aamir b Mukidul	30	30	2	1	100.00
Tanzid Hasan	c Aamir b Mukidul	100	62	6	7	161.29
Kane Williamson	c Naim b Shoriful	24	15	2	1	160.00
James Neesham*	not out	7	6	0	0	116.67
Najmul Hossain Shanto (c)	c&b Shoriful	11	7	1	0	157.14
Mushfiqur Rahim †	DNB					
SM Meherob	DNB					
Abdul Gaffar Saqlain	DNB					
Tanzim Hasan Sakib	DNB					
Binura Fernando	DNB					
Hasan Murad	DNB					
Extras 2 (w 2); Total 174/4 (20)				11	9	8.70 RR

Fall of wickets: 1-83 (Sahibzada Farhan, 10.2 ov), 2-130 (Kane Williamson, 15.4 ov), 3-163 (Tanzid Hasan, 18.5 ov), 4-174 (Najmul Hossain Shanto, 19.6 ov)

Chattogram Royals bowling
Bowler	Overs	Maidens	Runs	Wickets	Econ	Wides	NBs
Shoriful Islam	4	0	33	2	8.25	0	0
Mukidul Islam	4	0	20	2	5.00	0	0
Tanvir Islam	3	0	17	0	5.67	0	0
Mahedi Hasan (c)	4	0	48	0	12.00	0	0
Mirza Tahir Baig	1	0	13	0	13.00	0	0
Aamir Jamal	4	0	43	0	10.75	2	0

2nd innings

Chattogram Royals batting
Player	Status	Runs	Balls	4s	6s	Strike rate
Mirza Tahir Baig	st †Mushfiqur b Murad	39	36	2	1	108.33
Mohammad Naim	b Fernando	9	10	2	0	90.00
Mahmudul Hasan Joy	c Tanzid b Fernando	0	2	0	0	0.00
Hassan Nawaz	c Meherob b Murad	11	7	1	1	157.14
Zahiduzzaman †	c Meherob b Neesham	11	13	0	0	84.61
Mahedi Hasan (c)	c Tanzim b Murad	4	5	0	0	80.00
Asif Ali	c Williamson b Fernando	21	16	1	2	131.25
Aamir Jamal	b Neesham	8	5	0	1	160.00
Shoriful Islam	c Meherob b Fernando	0	7	0	0	0.00
Tanvir Islam*	not out	1	1	0	0	100.00
Mukidul Islam	c Tanzid b Saqlain	1	6	0	0	16.67
Extras 6 (b 2, nb 1, w 3); Total 111 (17.5)				6	5	6.22 RR

Fall of wickets: 1-18 (Mohammad Naim, 2.3 ov), 2-18 (Mahmudul Hasan Joy, 2.5 ov), 3-39 (Hasan Nawaz, 5.4 ov), 4-64 (Zahiduzzaman, 9.3 ov), 5-72 (Mahedi Hasan, 11.3 ov), 6-92 (Mirza Baig, 13.6 ov), 7-109 (Aamer Jamal, 15.2 ov), 8-109 (Asif Ali, 16.1 ov), 9-110 (Shoriful Islam, 16.5 ov), 10-111 (Mukidul Islam, 17.5 ov)

Rajshahi Warriors bowling
Bowler	Overs	Maidens	Runs	Wickets	Econ	Wides	NBs
Binura Fernando	3	0	9	4	3.00	1	0
James Neesham	4	0	24	2	6.00	0	0
Tanzim Hasan Sakib	3	0	37	0	12.33	2	0
Abdul Gaffar Saqlain	3.5	0	24	1	6.26	0	1
Hasan Murad	4	0	15	3	3.75	0	0

Notes:

- (c) : Captain
- † : Wicket keeper
- * : Not out
