= Bangladeshi cricket team in the West Indies in 2022 =

International cricket tour

	West Indies	Bangladesh
- Dates: 16 June – 16 July 2022
Captains	Kraigg Brathwaite (Tests); Nicholas Pooran (ODIs & T20Is)	Shakib Al Hasan (Tests); Tamim Iqbal (ODIs); Mahmudullah (T20Is)

Test series
- Result: West Indies won the 2-match series 2–0
Most runs	Kyle Mayers (153)	Shakib Al Hasan (138)
Most wickets	Alzarri Joseph (12)	Khaled Ahmed (10)
- Player of the series: Kyle Mayers (WI)

One Day International series
- Results: Bangladesh won the 3-match series 3–0
Most runs	Nicholas Pooran (91)	Tamim Iqbal (117)
Most wickets	Gudakesh Motie (6)	Mehidy Hasan (7)
- Player of the series: Tamim Iqbal (Ban)

Twenty20 International series
- Results: West Indies won the 3-match series 2–0
Most runs	Nicholas Pooran (108)	Shakib Al Hasan (102)
Most wickets	Romario Shepherd (6)	Four bowlers took two wickets each (Note: Nasum Ahmed, Shakib Al Hasan, Mahedi Hasan and Shoriful Islam all took two wickets each.)
- Player of the series: Nicholas Pooran (WI)

The Bangladesh cricket team toured the West Indies in June and July 2022 to play two Test, three One Day International (ODI), and three Twenty20 International (T20I) matches. The Test matches formed part of the 2021–2023 ICC World Test Championship. A draft tour itinerary was announced in May 2022. The full details of the tour were confirmed on 1 June 2022.

On 22 May 2022, the Bangladesh Cricket Board (BCB) announced all the squads for the tour to the West Indies, with Mominul Haque captaining the Test side. However, after Bangladesh lost their two-match Test series against Sri Lanka, Haque resigned as the captain of Bangladesh's Test team. Shakib Al Hasan was named as Bangladesh's new Test captain, with Litton Das being appointed as his deputy.

A day before the first Test, the Test series was named as the Padma Bridge Friendship Series, to celebrate the inauguration of Bangladesh's ambitious Padma Bridge project. The West Indies won the first Test by seven wickets early on the fourth day, after Bangladesh were bowled out for just 103 runs in their first innings. The West Indies won the second Test by ten wickets to win the series 2–0. The defeat in the second Test was Bangladesh's 100th loss in Test cricket.

Between the Test and T20I series, Bangladeshi cricketers reported to have experienced an uncomfortable ferry ride, with several players suffering from motion sickness from high waves due to a cyclone two days previous. One of the players said to Prothom Alo "We are the ones who can fall sick and die here, us, nothing will happen to them. I have toured many countries, this is the first time I am experiencing something like this. None of us are used to this. Forget about playing, what will happen if one of us gets seriously ill in the ferry. This is the worst tour of my life".

The first T20I was delayed by nearly two hours due to a wet outfield. After several rain interruptions, only 13 overs of play was possible, with the match ending in a no result. The following day, the second T20I was played at the same venue, with the West Indies winning by 35 runs. The West Indies won the third and final T20I match by five wickets to win the series 2–0.

Bangladesh won the first ODI match by six wickets to record their first win of the tour. Bangladesh won the second match by nine wickets to win the series with a match to play. Bangladesh won the third ODI match by four wickets to win the series 3–0. Shortly after winning the series, Bangladesh's ODI captain Tamim Iqbal announced his retirement from T20I cricket.

== Squads ==
Tests		ODIs		T20Is	
West Indies	Bangladesh	West Indies	Bangladesh	West Indies	Bangladesh
Kraigg Brathwaite (c); Jermaine Blackwood (vc); Nkrumah Bonner; John Campbell; Joshua Da Silva; Alzarri Joseph; Kyle Mayers; Gudakesh Motie; Anderson Phillip; Raymon Reifer; Kemar Roach; Jayden Seales; Devon Thomas	Shakib Al Hasan (c); Litton Das (vc, wk); Khaled Ahmed; ~~Yasir Ali~~; Anamul Haque; Mominul Haque; Mehidy Hasan; Nurul Hasan (wk); Ebadot Hossain; Mosaddek Hossain; Tamim Iqbal; Shoriful Islam; Taijul Islam; Mahmudul Hasan Joy; Mustafizur Rahman; Rejaur Rahman Raja; Najmul Hossain Shanto	Nicholas Pooran (c); Shai Hope (vc); Shamarh Brooks; Keacy Carty; Akeal Hosein; Alzarri Joseph; Brandon King; Kyle Mayers; Gudakesh Motie; Keemo Paul; Romario Shepherd; Anderson Phillip; Rovman Powell; Jayden Seales	Tamim Iqbal (c); Nasum Ahmed; Taskin Ahmed; ~~Yasir Ali~~; Litton Das (wk); Anamul Haque; Mehidy Hasan; Nurul Hasan (wk); ~~Shakib Al Hasan~~; Afif Hossain; Ebadot Hossain; Mosaddek Hossain; Shoriful Islam; Taijul Islam; Mahmudullah; Mustafizur Rahman; ~~Mohammad Saifuddin~~; Najmul Hossain Shanto	Nicholas Pooran (c); Rovman Powell (vc); Shamarh Brooks; Dominic Drakes; Akeal Hosein; Alzarri Joseph; Brandon King; Kyle Mayers; Obed McCoy; Keemo Paul; Romario Shepherd; Odean Smith; Devon Thomas; Hayden Walsh Jr.	Mahmudullah (c); Nasum Ahmed; Taskin Ahmed; ~~Yasir Ali~~; Litton Das (wk); Anamul Haque; Mahedi Hasan; Nurul Hasan (wk); Shakib Al Hasan; Afif Hossain; Mosaddek Hossain; Shohidul Islam; Shoriful Islam; Mustafizur Rahman; ~~Mohammad Saifuddin~~; Munim Shahriar

The West Indies also named Tagenarine Chanderpaul and Shermon Lewis as reserve players for the Test matches. The day before the first Test, Kemar Roach was added to West Indies' Test squad. Romario Shepherd and Dominic Drakes were named as reserve players in the West Indies ODI and T20I squads respectively. Ahead of the first ODI, Keemo Paul tested positive for COVID-19 and was replaced by Romario Shepherd in the West Indies' squad.

Yasir Ali was ruled out Bangladesh's squad for the Test series after suffering a back injury in the warm-up match, with Anamul Haque named as his replacement. Yasir Ali was also later ruled out of the T20I and ODI matches, after failing to recover from his back injury. Ahead of the second Test match, Mohammad Saifuddin was also ruled out of Bangladesh's squad for the T20I and ODI matches due to a back injury. Ahead of the third T20I match, the Bangladesh Cricket Board (BCB) confirmed that Shakib Al Hasan would unavailable for the ODI series.

== Warm-up match ==
Prior to the Test series, Bangladesh played a three-day warm-up match against the CWI President's XI side.

10–12 June 2022
Scorecard

Bangladesh	v	CWI President's XI
310/7d (97 overs); Tamim Iqbal 162* (287); Jeremiah Louis 2/47 (15 overs)		359/8d (108 overs); Jeremy Solozano 92 (217); Mustafizur Rahman 3/34 (6 overs)
47/1 (20 overs); Mehidy Hasan 32* (51)

Match drawn
Coolidge Cricket Ground, Antigua

- Bangladesh won the toss and elected to bat.

== Test series ==
=== 1st Test ===
16–20 June 2022 (Note: While five days of play were scheduled for each Test, both Tests reached a result in four days.)
Scorecard

Bangladesh	v	West Indies
103 (32.5 overs); Shakib Al Hasan 51 (67); Alzarri Joseph 3/33 (8.5 overs)		265 (112.5 overs); Kraigg Brathwaite 94 (268); Mehidy Hasan 4/59 (22.5 overs)
245 (90.5 overs); Nurul Hasan 64 (147); Kemar Roach 5/53 (24.5 overs)		88/3 (22 overs); John Campbell 58* (67); Khaled Ahmed 3/27 (8 overs)

West Indies won by 7 wickets
Sir Vivian Richards Stadium, North Sound
Umpires: Chris Gaffaney (NZ) and Joel Wilson (WI)
Player of the match: Kemar Roach (WI)

- West Indies won the toss and elected to field.
- Gudakesh Motie (WI) made his Test debut.
- Tamim Iqbal (Ban) scored his 5,000th run in Tests.
- Kemar Roach (WI) took his tenth five-wicket haul in Tests, and his 50th Test wicket at the Sir Vivian Richards Stadium.
- World Test Championship points: West Indies 12, Bangladesh 0.

=== 2nd Test ===
24–28 June 2022
Scorecard

Bangladesh	v	West Indies
234 (64.2 overs); Litton Das 53 (70); Alzarri Joseph 3/50 (15 overs)		408 (126.3 overs); Kyle Mayers 146 (208); Khaled Ahmed 5/106 (31.3 overs)
186 (45 overs); Nurul Hasan 60* (50); Jayden Seales 3/21 (8 overs)		13/0 (2.5 overs); John Campbell 9* (11)

West Indies won by 10 wickets
Daren Sammy Cricket Ground, Gros Islet
Umpires: Richard Illingworth (Eng) and Joel Wilson (WI)
Player of the match: Kyle Mayers (WI)

- West Indies won the toss and elected to field.
- No play was possible before tea on day 4 due to a wet outfield.
- Anderson Phillip (WI) made his Test debut.
- Khaled Ahmed (Ban) took his first five-wicket haul in Tests.
- Kemar Roach (WI) took his 250th wicket in Tests.
- World Test Championship points: West Indies 12, Bangladesh 0.

== T20I series ==
=== 1st T20I ===
2 July 2022
13:30
Scorecard

Bangladesh; 105/8 (13 overs)	v	West Indies
Shakib Al Hasan 29 (15); Romario Shepherd 3/21 (3 overs)

No result
Windsor Park, Dominica
Umpires: Gregory Brathwaite (WI) and Patrick Gustard (WI)

- West Indies won the toss and elected to field.
- No further play was possible due to rain.

=== 2nd T20I ===
3 July 2022
13:30
Scorecard

West Indies; 193/5 (20 overs)	v	Bangladesh; 158/6 (20 overs)
Rovman Powell 61* (28); Shoriful Islam 2/40 (4 overs)		Shakib Al Hasan 68* (52); Romario Shepherd 2/28 (4 overs)

West Indies won by 35 runs
Windsor Park, Dominica
Umpires: Nigel Duguid (WI) and Leslie Reifer (WI)
Player of the match: Rovman Powell (WI)

- West Indies won the toss and elected to bat.
- Shakib Al Hasan (Ban) became the first cricketer to achieve the double of scoring 2,000 runs and taking 100 wickets in T20Is.

=== 3rd T20I ===
7 July 2022
13:30
Scorecard

Bangladesh; 163/5 (20 overs)	v	West Indies; 169/5 (18.2 overs)
Afif Hossain 50 (38); Hayden Walsh Jr. 2/25 (4 overs)		Nicholas Pooran 74* (39); Nasum Ahmed 2/44 (4 overs)

West Indies won by 5 wickets
Providence Stadium, Georgetown
Umpires: Gregory Brathwaite (WI) and Leslie Reifer (WI)
Player of the match: Nicholas Pooran (WI)

- Bangladesh won the toss and elected to bat.

== ODI series ==
=== 1st ODI ===
10 July 2022
09:30
Scorecard

West Indies; 149/9 (41 overs)	v	Bangladesh; 151/4 (31.5 overs)
Shamarh Brooks 33 (66); Shoriful Islam 4/34 (8 overs)		Mahmudullah 41* (69); Gudakesh Motie 1/18 (9 overs)

Bangladesh won by 6 wickets
Providence Stadium, Georgetown
Umpires: Gregory Brathwaite (WI) and Joel Wilson (WI)
Player of the match: Mehidy Hasan (Ban)

- Bangladesh won the toss and elected to field.
- The match was reduced to 41 overs per side due to a wet outfield.
- Gudakesh Motie (WI) and Nasum Ahmed (Ban) both made their ODI debuts.

=== 2nd ODI ===
13 July 2022
09:30
Scorecard

West Indies; 108 (35 overs)	v	Bangladesh; 112/1 (20.4 overs)
Keemo Paul 25* (24); Mehidy Hasan 4/29 (8 overs)		Tamim Iqbal 50* (62); Gudakesh Motie 1/39 (7.4 overs)

Bangladesh won by 9 wickets
Providence Stadium, Georgetown
Umpires: Nigel Duguid (WI) and Joel Wilson (WI)
Player of the match: Nasum Ahmed (Ban)

- Bangladesh won the toss and elected to field.

=== 3rd ODI ===
16 July 2022
09:30
Scorecard

West Indies; 178 (48.4 overs)	v	Bangladesh; 179/6 (48.3 overs)
Nicholas Pooran 73 (109); Taijul Islam 5/28 (10 overs)		Litton Das 50 (65); Gudakesh Motie 4/23 (10 overs)

Bangladesh won by 4 wickets
Providence Stadium, Georgetown
Umpires: Leslie Reifer (WI) and Joel Wilson (WI)
Player of the match: Taijul Islam (Ban)

- Bangladesh won the toss and elected to field.
- Taijul Islam (Ban) took his first five-wicket haul in ODIs.
