= Noakhali Express =

Franchise competing in BPL (Bangladesh Premier League)

- League: Bangladesh Premier League

Personnel
- Captain: Shykat Ali; Haider Ali
- Coach: Khaled Mahmud
- Owner: Desh Travels
- Manager: Ashraful Aarif

Team information
- City: Noakhali, Bangladesh
- Colours: Sky Blue
- Founded: 2025; 1 year ago
- Home ground: Shaheed Bulu Stadium
- Official website: noakhaliexpressbpl.com

Noakhali Express (Bengali: নোয়াখালী এক্সপ্রেস) is a professional franchise Twenty20 cricket team based in Noakhali, Bangladesh. The team is a newly added franchise set to compete in the Bangladesh Premier League (BPL), the country's premier domestic T20 competition, starting from the upcoming 2026 edition.

The team is the first franchise representing the Noakhali region in the history of the BPL.

== History ==
=== Formation and ownership ===
The franchise was officially introduced by the Bangladesh Cricket Board (BCB) and the BPL Governing Council in November 2025 as part of an expansion plan to increase the league from five to six teams.

The ownership rights for the Noakhali franchise were acquired by the transportation company, Desh Travels, who secured a five-year agreement.

=== 2026 Bangladesh Premier League season ===
The Noakhali Express team is scheduled to make its debut in the 2026 BPL season, which is slated to begin on 26 December 2025. The squad was finalised at the players' auction, which returns to the BPL after a 12-year hiatus, on 30 November 2025 in Dhaka.

Noakhali had already signed Soumya Sarker, Kusal Mendis, Johnson Charles and Hasan Mahmud before the auction.

Other notable signings include Jaker Ali, Mahidul Islam Ankon, Rejaur Rahman Raja, Mehedi Hasan Rana, the father-son duo of Mohammad Nabi and Hassan Eisakhil, Sediqullah Atal, Evin Lewis, Zahir Khan and Maaz Sadaqat.

== Current squad ==
The squad of Noakhali Express for 2025–26 season is:

Name	Nationality	Batting style	Bowling style	Notes
Batters
Soumya Sarkar	Bangladesh	Left-handed	Right-arm medium	—N/a
Habibur Rahman Sohan	Bangladesh	Right-handed	—N/a	
Shahadat Hossain Dipu	Bangladesh	Right-handed	Right-arm off break	—N/a
Haider Ali	Pakistan	Right-handed	—N/a	Overseas
Sediqullah Atal	Afghanistan	Left-handed	—N/a	Overseas
Hassan Eisakhil	Afghanistan	Right-handed	—N/a	Overseas
Wicket-keepers
Johnson Charles	West Indies	Right-handed	—N/a	Overseas
Kusal Mendis	Sri Lanka	Right-handed	—N/a	Overseas
Jaker Ali	Bangladesh	Right-handed	—N/a	
Mahidul Islam Ankon	Bangladesh	Right-handed	—N/a	
All-rounders
Maaz Sadaqat	Pakistan	Left-handed	Slow left-arm orthodox	Overseas
Rahmatullah Ali	Bangladesh	Right-handed	Right-arm off break	—N/a
Shykat Ali	Bangladesh	Right-handed	Right-arm medium	Captain
Sabbir Hossain	Bangladesh	Right-handed	Right-arm medium	—N/a
Mohammad Nabi	Afghanistan	Right-handed	Right-arm off break	Overseas
Spin bowlers
Nazmul Islam Apu	Bangladesh	Left-handed	Slow left-arm orthodox	—N/a
Abu Hasim	Bangladesh	Left-handed	Slow left-arm orthodox	—N/a
Zahir Khan	Afghanistan	Left-handed	Left-arm Chinaman	Overseas
Pace bowlers
Hasan Mahmud	Bangladesh	Right-handed	Right-arm fast-medium	—N/a
Mehedi Hasan Rana	Bangladesh	Left-handed	Left-arm fast	—N/a
Rejaur Rahman Raja	Bangladesh	Right-handed	Right-arm medium fast	—N/a
Musfik Hasan	Bangladesh	Right-handed	Right-arm medium	—N/a
Ihsanullah Khan	Pakistan	Right-handed	Right-arm fast	Overseas
Bilal Sami	Afghanistan	Right-handed	Right-arm medium	Overseas
Ibrar Ahmad	United Arab Emirates	Right-handed	Right-arm medium fast	Overseas

== Coaching staff ==
The coaching panel of Noakhali Express for the season 2025-26 is:

Role	Name
Head coach	Khaled Mahmud
Assistant coach	Talha Jubair
