= Sri Lankan cricket team in Bangladesh in 2022 =

International cricket tour

	Bangladesh	Sri Lanka
- Dates: 15 – 27 May 2022
Captains	Mominul Haque	Dimuth Karunaratne

Test series
- Result: Sri Lanka won the 2-match series 1–0
Most runs	Mushfiqur Rahim (303)	Angelo Mathews (344)
Most wickets	Shakib Al Hasan (9)	Asitha Fernando (13)
- Player of the series: Angelo Mathews (SL)

The Sri Lanka cricket team toured Bangladesh in May 2022 to play two Test matches. The Test series formed part of the 2021–2023 ICC World Test Championship. The fixtures for the tour were confirmed in March 2022. In June 2020, the International Cricket Council (ICC) relaxed its rules on using neutral match officials, due to the impact of the COVID-19 pandemic. In April 2022, the ICC confirmed that neutral umpires would return to Test match cricket, with Richard Kettleborough from England and Joel Wilson of the West Indies standing in the first and second Tests respectively.

The first Test ended in a draw late on the fifth day, with Sri Lanka's Dinesh Chandimal and Niroshan Dickwella putting on an unbeaten partnership of 99 for the seventh wicket. Teammate Angelo Mathews was named the player of the match, after he scored 199 in the first innings. One the first day of the second Test, Bangladesh were reduced to 24/5 within the first hour of the match. Mushfiqur Rahim and Litton Das then made a partnership of 272 runs, the highest partnership for the sixth wicket or lower in a Test match after a team had lost its first five wickets for less than 25 runs. Bangladesh were bowled out for 365 runs in their first innings, with Mushfiqur Rahim finishing on 175 not out. In reply, Sri Lanka made 506, with Angelo Mathews again top-scoring for the side, with an unbeaten 145 runs. Bangladesh could only manage to score 169 in their second innings, with Sri Lanka winning by ten wickets to win the two-match series 1–0.

Following the conclusion of the tour, Mominul Haque resigned as the captain of Bangladesh's Test team.

== Squads ==
Tests
Bangladesh	Sri Lanka
Mominul Haque (c); Khaled Ahmed; Yasir Ali; Litton Das (wk); Mehidy Hasan; Nayeem Hasan; Nurul Hasan; Shakib Al Hasan; Ebadot Hossain; Mosaddek Hossain; Tamim Iqbal; Shohidul Islam; Shoriful Islam; Taijul Islam; Mahmudul Hasan Joy; Mushfiqur Rahim; Rejaur Rahman Raja; Najmul Hossain Shanto	Dimuth Karunaratne (c); Dinesh Chandimal; Dhananjaya de Silva; Niroshan Dickwella; Lasith Embuldeniya; Asitha Fernando; Oshada Fernando; Vishwa Fernando; Praveen Jayawickrama; Chamika Karunaratne; Suminda Lakshan; Dilshan Madushanka; Angelo Mathews; Kamindu Mendis; Kusal Mendis; Ramesh Mendis; Kamil Mishara; Kasun Rajitha

Prior to the series, Mehidy Hasan was ruled out Bangladesh's squad for the first Test due to a finger injury, with Nayeem Hasan named as his replacement. On 29 April 2022, Mosaddek Hossain was also added to Bangladesh's squad for the first Test. Shakib Al Hasan was initially ruled out of Bangladesh's squad for the first Test after he tested positive for COVID-19. However, he later provided a negative test, allowing him to play in the match. Bangladesh's Shoriful Islam and Nayeem Hasan were both ruled out of the second Test, after they suffered a fractured hand and a fractured finger respectively.

== Warm-up match ==
10–11 May 2022
Scorecard

Sri Lanka	v	Bangladesh Cricket Board XI
50/1 (18.2 overs); Oshada Fernando 26* (68); Mukidul Islam 1/6 (4 overs)

Match drawn
Bangladesh Krira Shikkha Protisthan No 3 Ground, Dhaka
Umpires: Masudur Rahman (Ban) and Gazi Sohel (Ban)

- Sri Lanka won the toss and elected to bat.
- Only 18.2 overs of play was possible due to rain.

== Test series ==
=== 1st Test ===
15–19 May 2022
Scorecard

Sri Lanka	v	Bangladesh
397 (153 overs); Angelo Mathews 199 (397); Nayeem Hasan 6/105 (30 overs)		465 (170.1 overs); Tamim Iqbal 133 (218); Kasun Rajitha 4/60 (24.1 overs)
260/6 (90.1 overs); Niroshan Dickwella 61* (96); Taijul Islam 4/82 (34 overs)

Match drawn
Zohur Ahmed Chowdhury Stadium, Chittagong
Umpires: Richard Kettleborough (Note: Joel Wilson (WI) replaced Richard Kettleborough on the fourth day of the match, after Kettleborough was forced to leave the field due to excessive heat.) (Eng) and Sharfuddoula (Ban)
Player of the match: Angelo Mathews (SL)

- Sri Lanka won the toss and elected to bat.
- Kasun Rajitha replaced Vishwa Fernando as a concussion substitute for Sri Lanka.
- Tamim Iqbal (Ban) scored his 10th century in Tests.
- Mushfiqur Rahim became the first batter for Bangladesh to score 5,000 runs in Tests.
- World Test Championship points: Bangladesh 4, Sri Lanka 4.

=== 2nd Test ===
23–27 May 2022
Scorecard

Bangladesh	v	Sri Lanka
365 (116.2 overs); Mushfiqur Rahim 175* (355); Kasun Rajitha 5/64 (28.2 overs)		506 (165.1 overs); Angelo Mathews 145* (342); Shakib Al Hasan 5/96 (40.1 overs)
169 (55.3 overs); Shakib Al Hasan 58 (72); Asitha Fernando 6/51 (17.3 overs)		29/0 (3 overs); Oshada Fernando 21* (9)

Sri Lanka won by 10 wickets
Sher-e-Bangla National Cricket Stadium, Dhaka
Umpires: Sharfuddoula (Ban) and Joel Wilson (WI)
Player of the match: Asitha Fernando (SL)

- Bangladesh won the toss and elected to bat.
- 39 overs of play were lost on day 3 due to rain.
- Kasun Rajitha (SL) took his first five-wicket haul in Tests.
- Litton Das (Ban) scored his 2,000th run in Tests.
- Asitha Fernando (SL) took his first five-wicket haul in Tests.
- World Test Championship points: Sri Lanka 12, Bangladesh 0.
