= Rangpur Riders Cricket Arena =

Football stadium in Dhaka, Bangladesh

Coordinates: 23.8204°N 90.4705°E

- Riders of Hope
- Interactive map of Rangpur Riders Cricket Arena
- Location: Bashundhara Sports Complex; Bashundhara R/A; DNCC; Dhaka; Bangladesh
- Owner: Bashundhara Group
- Operator: Bashundhara Kings
- Capacity: 18,000
- Surface: GrassMaster

Construction
- Opened: 2 January 2023; 3 years ago
- Cost: €358.32 million
- Architect: Mohammad Foyez Ullah

Tenant
- Rangpur Riders (2023–present)

Rangpur Riders Cricket Arena is a cricket stadium in the Bashundhara Sports Complex, which is the home venue of Rangpur Riders. Bashundhara Sports Complex is located in Dhaka, Bangladesh which is considered as one of the largest sports complex in Bangladesh. It has been designed by Architect Mohammad Foyez Ullah of Volumezero Limited. The stadium was opened to the public on 4 January 2023. It has a seating capacity of 18,000.

== History ==
The Rangpur Riders have played a practice game against Khulna Tigers on 4 January 2023 at its home venue. Rangpur Riders is the first cricket club in Bangladesh whom have home venue in Bangladesh Premier League (T20). The club hint that they will be host their home matches at their own ground in future.

== See also ==
- Bashundhara Kings Arena
