= Salim Shahed =

Bangladeshi cricketer (born 1970)

Personal information
- Full name: Salim Shahed
- Born: 28 July 1970 (age 56)
- Role: Referee
- Source: ESPNcricinfo, 24 November 2020

Salim Shahed (Bengali: সেলিম শাহেদ; born 28 July 1970) is a former Bangladeshi first-class cricketer who played for Barisal Division. As of 2020, he was a match referee.
