= Hassan Eisakhil =

Afghan cricketer (born 2006)

Personal information
- Born: 28 July 2006 (age 20); Logar, Afghanistan
- Batting: Right-handed
- Role: Batsman
- Relatives: Mohammad Nabi (father)

International information
- National side: Afghanistan (2026–present)
- T20I debut (cap 70): 24 September 2026 v Japan
- Last T20I: 25 September 2026 v Nepal

Domestic team information
- Years: Team
- 2022: Boost Defenders
- 2024: Speenghar Tigers
- 2025: Hindukush Strikers
- 2025: Amo Sharks
- 2025: Noakhali Express

Career statistics
Competition	T20I	FC	LA	T20
Matches	2	6	14	43
Runs scored	3	343	586	1097
Batting average	1.50	31.18	41.85	28.86
100s/50s	0/	2/0	1/4	1/8
Top score	3	128	100
Catches/stumpings	1/–	9/–	6/–	26/–
- Source: cricinfo, 19 November 2026

Hassan Eisakhil (born 28 July 2006) is an Afghan cricketer. He is a right-handed opening batsman.

== Domestic career ==
In 2024, he hit a 45-ball 150 in a T20 match. He featured for Chitwan Rhinos in the 2024 Nepal Premier League, making his debut against the Kathmandu Gurkhas. He helped his team to victory against Royals on 8 December 2024 with a 52-ball 65.

In April 2025, he scored 143 in the Merwais Nika Regional 3-Day Trophy for Amo Region against Band-e-Amir in a team total of 225 runs, having previously also scored a half century in the first innings.

He scored a century on his first-class debut for Hindukush Strikers against the Maiwand Champions in the Ahmad Shah Abdali 4-day Tournament in 2025. He also scored a century in his third first-class match, reaching 100 from 108 balls before falling for 128 off 139 deliveries against Pamir Legends.

In January 2026, Eshakeel joined the Noakhali Express for the 2025–26 Bangladesh Premier League, where he made history by playing alongside his father, the veteran all-rounder Mohammad Nabi. Making his debut on 11 January 2026, against Dhaka Capitals, he delivered a match-winning performance by scoring 92 runs off 62 balls. During the innings, he shared a 101-run opening stand with Soumya Sarkar and a historic 53-run partnership with his father. His performance led Noakhali Express to a 41-run victory and earned him the Man of the Match award in his first appearance of the tournament.

== International career ==
In 2023, he hit a 32-ball fifty for Afghanistan under19 against India U19. He was part of the Afghanistan Under-19s squad in the 2024 Under-19 Cricket World Cup.

== Personal life ==
Eisakhil is the son of Afghan international cricketer Mohammad Nabi. His father famously delayed his retirement from One Day International (ODI) cricket following the 2025 Champions Trophy specifically to fulfill his dream of playing alongside Hassan for the Afghanistan national team. The two had previously played against each other in the Shpageeza Cricket League in 2024, but the 2026 BPL marked their first instance as teammates.
