= Rejaur Rahman Raja =

Bangladeshi cricketer

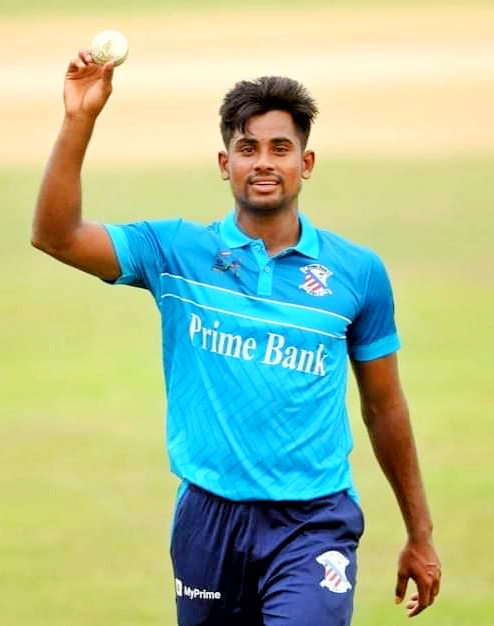

Personal information
- Full name: Rejaur Rahman Raja
- Born: 1 November 1999 (age 27)
- Batting: Right-handed
- Bowling: Right-arm medium
- Role: Bowler

Domestic team information
- Years: Team
- 2020: Rajshahi
- 2022: Chattogram Challengers (squad no. 24)
- 2026: Noakhali Express

Career statistics
Competition	FC	LA	T20
Matches	22	41	35
Runs scored	353	109	51
Batting average	13.07	5.73	10.20
100s/50s	0/0	0/0	0/0
Top score	39	22	12
Balls bowled	2,983	1,785	690
Wickets	71	68	36
Bowling average	25.26	22.89	25.30
5 wickets in innings	2	2	0
10 wickets in match	0	–	–
Best bowling	5/51	8/23	4/14
Catches/stumpings	4/–	14/–	12/–
- Source: Cricinfo, 7 May 2024

Rejaur Rahman Raja (born 1 November 1999) is a Bangladeshi cricketer. He made his List A debut for Prime Doleshwar Sporting Club in the 2018–19 Dhaka Premier Division Cricket League on 21 April 2019. He made his first-class debut on 10 October 2019, for Sylhet Division in the 2019–20 National Cricket League. He made his Twenty20 debut on 28 November 2020, for Minister Group Rajshahi in the 2020–21 Bangabandhu T20 Cup. He was selected by the Chattogram Challengers for the 2022 Bangladesh Premier League. He played for Noakhali Express in BPL 2026.

In February 2021, he was selected in the Bangladesh Emerging squad for their home series against the Ireland Wolves. In November 2021, he was named in Bangladesh's Test squad for their series against Pakistan. In April 2022, he was again named in Bangladesh's Test squad, this time for their series against Sri Lanka. The following month, he was also named in Bangladesh's Test squad, for their series against the West Indies.

In March 2023, he was named in the Bangladesh Twenty20 International (T20I) squad for their series against England. In May 2024, playing for Prime Bank Cricket Club against Sheikh Jamal Dhanmondi Club, he took 8 for 23, the best List A figures in the history of the Dhaka Premier Division Cricket League.
