= Mehedi Hasan Rana =

Bangladeshi cricketer (born 1997)

Personal information
- Full name: Mehedi Hasan Rana
- Born: 1 January 1997 (age 29); Chandpur, Bangladesh
- Height: 5 ft 11 in (1.80 m)
- Batting: Left-handed
- Bowling: Left-arm fast

Domestic team information
- Years: Team
- 2026: Noakhali Express

Career statistics
Competition	FC	LA	T20
Matches	44	52	67
Runs scored	675	221	87
Batting average	14.06	8.84	6.21
100s/50s	0/2	0/0	0/0
Top score	57*	49	13
Balls bowled	6,463	1,984	1,323
Wickets	126	54	84
Bowling average	29.20	34.75	21.79
5 wickets in innings	3	0	0
10 wickets in match	1	0	0
Best bowling	7/31	4/29	4/17
Catches/stumpings	22/–	14/–	17/–
Medal record
Men's Cricket
Representing Bangladesh
South Asian Games
Gold medal – first place	2019 Kathmandu/Pokhara	Team
- Source: ESPN Cricinfo, 21 June 2026

Mehedi Hasan Rana (born 1 January 1997) is a first-class cricketer from Bangladesh. In December 2015 he was named in Bangladesh's squad for the 2016 Under-19 Cricket World Cup.

== Career ==
=== Bangladesh Premier League ===
He made his Twenty20 debut for Comilla Victorians on 5 November 2017 in the 2017–18 Bangladesh Premier League. In October 2018, he was named in the squad for the Sylhet Sixers team, following the draft for the 2018–19 Bangladesh Premier League.

=== Under-19 career ===
In November 2019, he was named in Bangladesh's squad for the 2019 ACC Emerging Teams Asia Cup in Bangladesh. Later the same month, he was named in Bangladesh's squad for the cricket tournament at the 2019 South Asian Games. The Bangladesh team won the gold medal, after they beat Sri Lanka by seven wickets in the final.

In November 2021, he was selected to play for the Kandy Warriors following the players' draft for the 2021 Lanka Premier League.
