= Khaled Ahmed =

Bangladeshi cricketer

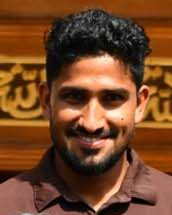

Personal information
- Full name: Syed Khaled Ahmed
- Born: 20 September 1992 (age 34); Sylhet, Bangladesh
- Batting: Right-handed
- Bowling: Right-arm fast-medium
- Role: Bowler

International information
- National side: Bangladesh (2018–present)
- Test debut (cap 92): 11 November 2018 v Zimbabwe
- Last Test: 28 June 2026 v Zimbabwe
- ODI debut (cap 146): 23 September 2023 v New Zealand
- Last ODI: 26 September 2023 v New Zealand
- Only T20I (cap 92): 1 June 2025 v Pakistan

Domestic team information
- Years: Team
- 2015–present: Sylhet Division
- 2017: Dhaka Dynamites
- 2019: Chittagong Vikings
- 2022: Khulna Tigers
- 2023–2024: Fortune Barishal
- 2025: Chittagong Kings
- 2026: Kent

Career statistics
Competition	Test	ODI	FC	LA
Matches	18	2	73	79
Runs scored	55	1	348	155
Batting average	2.50	1.00	5.27	7.04
100s/50s	0/0	0/0	0/0	0/0
Top score	22	1	26	28*
Balls bowled	2,724	80	10,498	3,434
Wickets	34	3	206	107
Bowling average	47.23	24.00	28.99	30.24
5 wickets in innings	1	0	10	0
10 wickets in match	0	0	2	0
Best bowling	5/106	3/60	7/50	4/31
Catches/stumpings	5/–	0/–	33/–	27/–
- Source: ESPNcricinfo, 27 September 2026

Syed Khaled Ahmed (born 20 September 1992), known as Khaled Ahmed, is a Bangladeshi cricketer. He made his Test cricket debut for the Bangladesh cricket team in November 2018.

== Domestic career ==
Ahmed made his first-class debut for Sylhet Division in the 2015–16 National Cricket League on 10 October 2015. He made his List A debut for Prime Doleshwar Sporting Club in the 2016–17 Dhaka Premier Division Cricket League on 5 May 2017. He made his Twenty20 debut for Dhaka Dynamites on 5 November 2017 in the 2017–18 Bangladesh Premier League.

In October 2018, in the match against Dhaka Metropolis in the 2018–19 National Cricket League, he took his maiden ten-wicket haul in first-class cricket. Later the same month, he was named in the squad for the Chittagong Vikings, following the draft for the 2018–19 Bangladesh Premier League.

In September 2026, he following teammate Hasan Mahmud, Khaled has signed a contract with Kent to play matches in Division Two of the 2026 County Championship.

== International career ==
In August 2018, Ahmed was one of twelve debutants to be selected for a 31-man preliminary squad for Bangladesh ahead of the 2018 Asia Cup. In October 2018, he was named in Bangladesh's Test squad for their series against Zimbabwe. He made his debut against Zimbabwe on 11 November 2018. In December 2018, he was named in Bangladesh's team for the 2018 ACC Emerging Teams Asia Cup.

In February 2021, he was selected to play Bangladesh Emerging Team in their home series against Ireland Wolves. In April 2021, he was named in Bangladesh's preliminary Test squad for their series against Sri Lanka.

In March 2022, he was named in Bangladesh's One Day International (ODI) squad for their series against South Africa. In June 2022, in the second match against the West Indies, Khaled took his first five-wicket haul in Test cricket.
