= Sabbir Hossain =

Bangladeshi cricketer (born 1997)

Md. Sabbir Hossain
Personal information
- Full name: Sajjad Sabbir Hossain
- Born: 15 March 1997 (age 29)
- Batting: Right-handed
- Bowling: Right arm medium
- Role: All-rounder

Domestic team information
- Years: Team
- 2017-present: Rajshahi Division
- 2024: Durdanto Dhaka
- 2025: Durbar Rajshahi

Career statistics
Competition	FC	LA	T20
Matches	21	65	37
Runs scored	1,190	1,975	683
Batting average	31.31	30.85	20.69
100s/50s	3/5	3/10	0/2
Top score	150	125	77
Balls bowled	900	864	177
Wickets	22	24	9
Bowling average	21.27	33.91	30.22
5 wickets in innings	1	0	0
10 wickets in match	0	0	0
Best bowling	6/47	4/28	3/21
Catches/stumpings	11/-	21/-	13/-
- Source: Cricinfo, 2 October 2025

Md. Sabbir Hossain (born 15 March 1997) is a Bangladeshi cricketer. He made his List A debut for Partex Sporting Club in the 2016–17 Dhaka Premier Division Cricket League on 17 April 2017. He made his first-class debut for Rajshahi Division in the 2017–18 National Cricket League on 6 October 2017. He made his Twenty20 debut for Shinepukur Cricket Club in the 2018–19 Dhaka Premier Division Twenty20 Cricket League on 25 February 2019.
