= Munim Shahriar =

Bangladeshi cricketer (born 1998)

Personal information
- Full name: Munim Shahriar Jummon
- Born: 22 May 1998 (age 28); Mymensingh, Bangladesh
- Nickname: Munim / Jummon
- Batting: Right handed
- Bowling: Right Handed
- Role: Batsman

International information
- National side: Bangladesh (2022)
- T20I debut (cap 74): 3 March 2022 v Afghanistan
- Last T20I: 31 July 2022 v Zimbabwe
- T20I shirt no.: 96

Career statistics
Competition	T20I	FC	LA	T20
Matches	5	4	43	34
Runs scored	34	143	832	662
Batting average	6.80	23.83	20.29	21.35
100s/50s	0/0	0/2	0/3	0/4
Top score	17	59	88	92*
Catches/stumpings	2/–	1/-	9/–	5/–
- Source: Cricinfo, 19 July 2025

Munim Shahriar (born 22 May 1998) is a Bangladeshi cricketer. He made his international debut for the Bangladesh cricket team in March 2022.

== Career ==
He made his List A debut for Gazi Group Cricketers in the 2016–17 Dhaka Premier Division Cricket League on 29 April 2017. He made his Twenty20 debut for Abahani Limited in the 2018–19 Dhaka Premier Division Twenty20 Cricket League on 25 February 2019. He made his first-class debut on 31 October 2021, for Dhaka Metropolis in the 2021–22 National Cricket League.

In February 2022, he was named in Bangladesh's Twenty20 International (T20I) squad for the series against Afghanistan, following his performance in the 2021–22 Bangladesh Premier League. He made his T20I debut on 3 March 2022, against Afghanistan.
