= Shykat Ali =

Bangladeshi cricketer (born 1993)

Personal information
- Full name: Mohammad Shykat Ali
- Born: 20 December 1993 (age 32); Manikganj, Bangladesh
- Batting: Right-handed
- Bowling: Right-arm medium
- Role: Allrounder

Career statistics
Competition	FC	LA	T20
Matches	80	148	64
Runs scored	3,355	4,044	1,017
Batting average	24.31	29.09	18.49
100s/50s	2/15	3/29	0/4
Top score	175	115*	63
Balls bowled	3422	994	188
Wickets	63	28	6
Bowling average	28.79	31.39	43.66
5 wickets in innings	3	0	0
10 wickets in match	0	0	0
Best bowling	5/31	3/17	2/24
Catches/stumpings	62/–	69/–	20/-
- Source: ESPN Cricinfo, 20 November 2025

Shykat Ali (born 20 December 1993) is a Bangladeshi cricketer. He was born in Manikganj District, Bangladesh. He was selected to play for Dhaka Dynamites in the Bangladesh Premier League in 2015.
