= 2025–26 Chattogram Royals season =

Bangladesh Premier League team season

Chattogram Royals
2025–26 season
- Coach: Mizanur Rahman Babul
- Captain: Mahedi Hasan
- Ground(s): Bir Shrestho Flight Lieutenant Matiur Rahman Cricket Stadium, Chattogram
- BPL League: Runners up
- Most runs: Mohammad Naim (272)
- Most wickets: Shoriful Islam (26)
- Most catches: Aamir Jamal (7)
- Most wicket-keeping dismissals: Adam Rossington (9)

The 2025–26 season is the 12th season for the Bangladesh Premier League franchise Chattogram Royals. They are one of the three renamed teams, changing their name from Chittagong Kings. They are yet to win the title. Their best performance is reaching the final and being runners up in the 2013 season. On 25 December 2025, Triangle Sports terminated the ownership of Chattogram Royals, and the Bangladesh Cricket Board took charge.

== Coaching panel ==
Position	Name
Mentor	Habibul Bashar
Team Manager	Nafees Iqbal
Head coach	Mizanur Rahman Babul
Assistant coach	
Batting coach	Tushar Imran
Bowling coach	

== Squad ==
The squad of Chattogram Royals for 2025–26 season is:

Name	Nationality	Batting style	Bowling style	Notes
Batters
Mohammad Naim	Bangladesh	Left-handed	—N/a	
Mahmudul Hasan Joy	Bangladesh	Right-handed	Right-arm off-break	—N/a
Mahfijul Islam	Bangladesh	Right-handed	Right-arm leg-break	—N/a
Mirza Tahir Baig	Pakistan	Right-handed	—N/a	Overseas
Asif Ali	Pakistan	Right-handed	Right-arm off break	Overseas
Hassan Nawaz	Pakistan	Right-handed	Right-arm medium	Overseas
Shadman Islam	Bangladesh	Left-handed	Slow left-arm orthodox	—N/a
~~Paul Stirling~~	Ireland	Right-handed	Right-arm off-break	Overseas
~~Avishka Fernando~~	Sri Lanka	Right-handed	Right-arm medium	Overseas
Wicket-keepers
Zahiduzzaman	Bangladesh	Left-handed	—N/a	
Masood Gurbaz	Afghanistan	Right-handed	—N/a	Overseas
Adam Rossington	England	Right-handed	—N/a	Overseas
Mohammad Haris	Pakistan	Right-handed	—N/a	Overseas
~~Niroshan Dickwella~~	Sri Lanka	Left-handed	—N/a	Overseas
All-rounders
Mahedi Hasan	Bangladesh	Right-handed	Right-arm off-break	Captain
~~Charith Asalanka~~	Sri Lanka	Left-handed	Right-arm off-break	Overseas
Shuvagata Hom	Bangladesh	Right-handed	Right-arm off-break	—N/a
Abu Hider	Bangladesh	Right-handed	Left-arm medium fast	—N/a
Salman Hossain	Bangladesh	Right-handed	Right-arm medium fast	—N/a
~~Angelo Perera~~	Sri Lanka	Right-handed	Slow left-arm orthodox	Overseas
Kamran Ghulam	Pakistan	Right-handed	Slow left-arm orthodox	Overseas
Cameron Delport	South Africa	Left-handed	Right-arm medium	Overseas
Aamir Jamal	Pakistan	Right-handed	Right-arm fast medium	Overseas
Pace bowlers
Shoriful Islam	Bangladesh	Left-handed	Left-arm medium fast	—N/a
Mukidul Islam	Bangladesh	Right-handed	Right-arm medium fast	—N/a
Sumon Khan	Bangladesh	Left-handed	Right-arm medium	—N/a
Ziaur Rahman	Bangladesh	Right-handed	Right-arm medium fast	—N/a
Spin bowlers
Tanvir Islam	Bangladesh	Left-handed	Slow left-arm orthodox	—N/a
Arafat Sunny	Bangladesh	Left-handed	Slow left-arm orthodox	—N/a
~~Abrar Ahmed~~	Pakistan	Right-handed	Right-arm leg-break	Overseas

== League stage ==
=== Points table ===
Pos	Team	Pld	W	L	NR	Pts	NRR	Qualification
1	Rajshahi Warriors (C)	10	8	2	0	16	0.335	Advanced to Qualifier 1
2	Chattogram Royals (R)	10	6	4	0	12	0.497	Advanced to Qualifier 1
3	Rangpur Riders (4th)	10	6	4	0	12	0.220	Advanced to Eliminator
4	Sylhet Titans (3rd)	10	5	5	0	10	0.373	Advanced to Eliminator
5	Dhaka Capitals	10	3	7	0	6	−0.381	Eliminated
6	Noakhali Express	10	2	8	0	4	−1.038	Eliminated

Source: ESPNcricinfo & Cricbuzz
(C) Champions; (R) Runners up

=== Win-loss table ===
Team	1	2	3	4	5	6	7	8	9	10	Q1	El	Q2	F	Pos.
Chattogram Royals	Noakhali; 65 runs	Rangpur; 7 wickets	Dhaka; 10 wickets	Sylhet; 9 wickets	Rangpur; 5 wickets	Sylhet; 14 runs	Rajshahi; 2 wickets	Noakhali; 5 wickets	Rajshahi; 3 wickets	Dhaka; 42 runs	Rajshahi; 6 wickets	—N/a		Rajshahi; 63 runs	Runners up

Team's results→	Won	Tied	Lost	N/R

=== Matches ===
Match 2
26 December 2025
19:45 (N)
Scorecard

Chattogram Royals; 174/6 (20 overs)	v	Noakhali Express; 109 (16.5 overs)
Mirza Tahir Baig 80 (69); Sabbir Hossain 2/9 (1 over)		Maaz Sadaqat 38 (27); Tanvir Islam 3/39 (4 overs)

Chattogram Royals won by 65 runs
Sylhet International Cricket Stadium, Sylhet
Umpires: Masudur Rahman (Ban) and Asif Yaqoob (Pak)
Player of the match: Mirza Tahir Baig (Chattogram Royals)

- Chattogram Royals won the toss and elected to bat.
- This was the first match of the BPL for Noakhali Express.

Match 5
29 December 2025
13:00
Scorecard

Chattogram Royals; 102 (17.5 overs)	v	Rangpur Riders; 107/3 (15 overs)
Mohammad Naim 39 (20); Faheem Ashraf 5/17 (3.5 overs)		Dawid Malan 51 (48); Mukidul Islam 2/5 (2 overs)

Rangpur Riders won by 7 wickets
Sylhet International Cricket Stadium, Sylhet
Umpires: Sajedul Islam (Ban) and Asif Yaqoob (Pak)
Player of the match: Faheem Ashraf (Rangpur Riders)

- Rangpur Riders won the toss and elected to field.

Match 9
2 January 2026
14:00
Scorecard

Dhaka Capitals; 122 (19.4 overs)	v	Chattogram Royals; 123/0 (12.4 overs)
Mohammad Saifuddin 33* (25); Tanvir Islam 3/8 (4 overs)		Adam Rossington 60* (36)

Chattogram Royals won by 10 wickets
Sylhet International Cricket Stadium, Sylhet
Umpires: Ali Arman (Ban) and Masudur Rahman (Ban)
Player of the match: Adam Rossington (Chattogram Royals)

- Chattogram Royals won the toss and elected to field.

Match 11
4 January 2026
13:00
Scorecard

Sylhet Titans; 126/7 (20 overs)	v	Chattogram Royals; 130/1 (16 overs)
Azmatullah Omarzai 44 (41); Mahedi Hasan 2/18 (4 overs)		Adam Rossington 73* (53); Rahatul Ferdous 1/29 (3 overs)

Chattogram Royals won by 9 wickets
Sylhet International Cricket Stadium, Sylhet
Umpires: Gazi Sohel (Ban) and Sajedul Islam (Ban)
Player of the match: Mohammad Naim (Chattogram Royals)

- Chattogram Royals won the toss and elected to field.
- Match postponed from 30 December 2025 to 4 January 2026 due to the passing away of the ex-Prime Minister of Bangladesh, Khaleda Zia.

Match 14
5 January 2026
18:00 (N)
Scorecard

Chattogram Royals; 169/5 (20 overs)	v	Rangpur Riders; 170/5 (18.5 overs)
Adam Rossington 58 (41); Akif Javed 2/29 (4 overs)		Kyle Mayers 50 (25); Shoriful Islam 3/37 (4 overs)

Rangpur Riders won by 5 wickets
Sylhet International Cricket Stadium, Sylhet
Umpires: Asif Yaqoob (Pak) and Gazi Sohel (Ban)
Player of the match: Kyle Mayers (Rangpur Riders)

- Rangpur Riders won the toss and elected to field.
- Litton Das (Rangpur Riders) completed 6000 runs in his T20 career.

Match 16
7 January 2026
18:00 (N)
Scorecard

Chattogram Royals; 198/5 (20 overs)	v	Sylhet Titans; 184 (19.4 overs)
Adam Rossington 49 (38); Ruyel Miah 3/41 (4 overs)		Afif Hossain 46 (33); Aamir Jamal 4/34 (4 overs)

Chattogram Royals won by 14 runs
Sylhet International Cricket Stadium, Sylhet
Umpires: Asif Yaqoob (Pak) and Morshed Ali Khan (Ban)
Player of the match: Mahmudul Hasan Joy (Chattogram Royals)

- Sylhet Titans won the toss and elected to field.

Match 19
9 January 2026
14:00
Scorecard

Rajshahi Warriors; 128/9 (20 overs)	v	Chattogram Royals; 129/8 (20 overs)
Muhammad Waseem 19 (14); Aamir Jamal 3/23 (4 overs)		Hassan Nawaz 35* (36); Binura Fernando 3/18 (4 overs)

Chattogram Royals won by 2 wickets
Sylhet International Cricket Stadium, Sylhet
Umpires: Gazi Sohel (Ban) and Ruchira Palliyaguruge (SL)
Player of the match: Aamir Jamal (Chattogram Royals)

- Chattogram Royals won the toss and elected to field.
- Binura Fernando (Rajshahi Warriors) completed 150 wickets in his T20 career.

Match 25
16 January 2026 (Note: Match rescheduled due to local cricketers' boycott.)
14:00
Scorecard

Noakhali Express; 126 (18.5 overs)	v	Chattogram Royals; 128/5 (17 overs)
Hassan Eisakhil 25 (20); Shoriful Islam 5/9 (3.5 overs)		Mahedi Hasan 49* (36); Ihsanullah 2/23 (4 overs)

Chattogram Royals won by 5 wickets
Sher-e-Bangla National Cricket Stadium, Dhaka
Umpires: Asif Yaqoob (Pak) and Tanvir Ahmed (Ban)
Player of the match: Shoriful Islam (Chattogram Royals)

- Chattogram Royals won the toss and elected to field.

Match 28
17 January 2026
18:00 (N)
Scorecard

Chattogram Royals; 125 (19.5 overs)	v	Rajshahi Warriors; 126/7 (19.3 overs)
Asif Ali 39 (24); Tanzim Hasan Sakib 4/17 (4 overs)		Akbar Ali 48 (40); Shoriful Islam 4/13 (4 overs)

Rajshahi Warriors won by 3 wickets
Sher-e-Bangla National Cricket Stadium, Dhaka
Umpires: Asif Yaqoob (Pak) and Muhammad Kamruzzaman (Ban)
Player of the match: Akbar Ali (Rajshahi Warriors)

- Rajshahi Warriors won the toss and elected to field.

Match 30
18 January 2026
18:00 (N)
Scorecard

Dhaka Capitals; 170 (19.5 overs)	v	Chattogram Royals; 128 (19.4 overs)
Saif Hassan 73 (44); Tanvir Islam 3/25 (4 overs)		Aamer Jamal 42 (26); Mohammad Saifuddin 4/20 (3.4 overs)

Dhaka Capitals won by 42 runs
Sher-e-Bangla National Cricket Stadium, Dhaka
Umpires: Gazi Sohel (Ban) and Muhammad Kamruzzaman (Ban)
Player of the match: Saif Hassan (Dhaka Capitals)

- Chattogram Royals won the toss and elected to field.

== Playoffs ==
Qualifier 1

Match 32
20 January 2026
18:00 (N)
Scorecard

Rajshahi Warriors; 133 (20 overs)	v	Chattogram Royals; 134/4 (19.3 overs)
Tanzid Hasan 41 (37); Mahedi Hasan 2/20 (4 overs)		Mirza Baig 45 (47); Abdul Gaffar Saqlain 2/20 (4 overs)

Chattogram Royals won by 6 wickets
Sher-e-Bangla National Cricket Stadium, Dhaka
Umpires: Tanvir Ahmed (Ban) Ruchira Palliyaguruge (SL)
Player of the match: Mahedi Hasan (Chattogram Royals)

- Chattogram Royals won the toss and elected to field.

Final

Match 34
23 January 2026
18:00 (N)
Scorecard

Rajshahi Warriors; 174/4 (20 overs)	v	Chattogram Royals; 111 (17.5 overs)
Tanzid Hasan 100 (62); Mukidul Islam 2/20 (4 overs)		Mirza Tahir Baig 39 (36); Binura Fernando 4/9 (3 overs)

Rajshahi Warriors won by 63 runs
Sher-e-Bangla National Cricket Stadium, Dhaka
Umpires: Gazi Sohel (Ban) and Ruchira Palliyaguruge (SL)
Player of the match: Tanzid Hasan (Rajshahi Warriors)

- Chattogram Royals won the toss and elected to field.

== See also ==
- 2025–26 Dhaka Capitals season
- 2025–26 Rajshahi Warriors season
- 2025–26 Rangpur Riders season
- 2025–26 Sylhet Titans season
- 2025–26 Noakhali Express season
