= 2025–26 Sylhet Titans season =

Bangladesh Premier League team season

Sylhet Titans
2025–26 season
- Coach: Sohel Islam
- Captain: Mehidy Hasan Miraz
- Ground(s): Sylhet International Cricket Stadium, Sylhet
- BPL League: 3rd
- Most runs: Parvez Hossain Emon (395)
- Most wickets: Nasum Ahmed (18)
- Most catches: Moeen Ali (5)
- Most wicket-keeping dismissals: Parvez Hossain Emon (13)

The 2025–26 season is the 11th season for the Bangladesh Premier League franchise Sylhet Titans. They were one of the six teams participating in the contest that season. They are yet to win the title and were runners-up only once in the 2023 season. This franchise is now owned by Cricket With Sami who got the ownership of this franchise in November 2025.

== Coaching Panel ==
Position	Name
Head coach	Sohel Islam
Senior assistant coach	AKM Mahmud Emon
Batting coach	Imrul Kayes
Fast Bowling coach	Syed Rasel
Spin Bowling coach	Enamul Haque Jr.
Team Manager	Rumi Rezwan
Analyst	Nasir Ahmed Nasu
Physio	Bayezidul Islam

== Squad ==
The squad of Sylhet Titans for 2025–26 season is:

Shirt no.	Name	Nationality	Batting style	Bowling style	Notes
Batters
63	Saim Ayub	Pakistan	Left-handed	Right-arm off-break	Overseas
—N/a	~~Aaron Jones~~	United States	Right-handed	Right-arm leg-break	Overseas
68	Mominul Haque	Bangladesh	Left-handed	Slow left-arm orthodox	—N/a
3	Hazratullah Zazai	Afghanistan	Left-handed	Slow left-arm orthodox	Overseas
21	Rony Talukdar	Bangladesh	Right-handed	—N/a	
Wicket-keepers
112	Parvez Hossain Emon	Bangladesh	Left-handed	—N/a	
23	Zakir Hasan	Bangladesh	Left-handed	—N/a	
18	Tawfique Khan	Bangladesh	Right-handed	—N/a	
777	Sam Billings	England	Right-handed	—N/a	Overseas
All-rounders
53	Mehidy Hasan Miraz	Bangladesh	Right-handed	Right-arm off-break	Captain
9	Azmatullah Omarzai	Afghanistan	Right-handed	Right-arm medium fast	Overseas
—N/a	~~Angelo Mathews~~	Sri Lanka	Right-handed	Right-arm medium	Overseas
19	Chris Woakes	England	Right-handed	Right-arm fast medium	Overseas
77	Ethan Brookes	England	Right-handed	Right-arm fast medium	Overseas
1	Moeen Ali	England	Left-handed	Right-arm off-break	Overseas
88	Afif Hossain	Bangladesh	Left-handed	Right-arm off-break	—N/a
88	Rahatul Ferdous	Bangladesh	Left-handed	Slow left-arm orthodox	—N/a
42	Ariful Islam	Bangladesh	Right-handed	Right-arm off break	—N/a
Pace bowlers
5	Mohammad Amir	Pakistan	Left-handed	Left-arm fast medium	Overseas
14	Khaled Ahmed	Bangladesh	Right-handed	Right-arm medium fast	—N/a
25	Shohidul Islam	Bangladesh	Right-handed	Right-arm medium fast	—N/a
58	Ebadot Hossain	Bangladesh	Right-handed	Right-arm medium fast	—N/a
27	Ruyel Miah	Bangladesh	Left-handed	Left-arm medium fast	—N/a
99	Salman Irshad	Pakistan	Right-handed	Right-arm fast medium	Overseas
Spin bowlers
10	Nasum Ahmed	Bangladesh	Left-handed	Slow left-arm orthodox	—N/a

== League stage ==
=== Points Table ===
Pos	Team	Pld	W	L	NR	Pts	NRR	Qualification
1	Rajshahi Warriors (C)	10	8	2	0	16	0.335	Advanced to Qualifier 1
2	Chattogram Royals (R)	10	6	4	0	12	0.497	Advanced to Qualifier 1
3	Rangpur Riders (4th)	10	6	4	0	12	0.220	Advanced to Eliminator
4	Sylhet Titans (3rd)	10	5	5	0	10	0.373	Advanced to Eliminator
5	Dhaka Capitals	10	3	7	0	6	−0.381	Eliminated
6	Noakhali Express	10	2	8	0	4	−1.038	Eliminated

Source: ESPNcricinfo & Cricbuzz
(C) Champions; (R) Runners up

=== Win-loss table ===
Team	1	2	3	4	5	6	7	8	9	10	Q1	El	Q2	F	Pos.
Sylhet Titans	Rajshahi; 8 wickets	Noakhali; 1 wicket	Dhaka; 6 runs	Rangpur; 6 wickets	Chattogram; 9 wickets	Noakhali; 6 wickets	Chattogram; 14 runs	Dhaka; 20 runs	Rangpur; 6 wickets	Rajshahi; 5 runs	—N/a	Rangpur; 3 wickets	Rajshahi; 12 runs	—N/a	3rd

Team's results→	Won	Tied	Lost	N/R

=== Matches ===
Match 1
26 December 2025
15:00 (D/N)
Scorecard

Sylhet Titans; 190/5 (20 overs)	v	Rajshahi Warriors; 192/2 (19.4 overs)
Parvez Hossain Emon 65* (33); Sandeep Lamichhane 2/38 (4 overs)		Najmul Hossain Shanto 101* (60); Khaled Ahmed 1/30 (3 overs)

Rajshahi Warriors won by 8 wickets
Sylhet International Cricket Stadium, Sylhet
Umpires: Tanvir Ahmed (Ban) and Sharfuddoula (Ban)
Player of the match: Najmul Hossain Shanto (Rajshahi Warriors)

- Rajshahi Warriors won the toss and elected to field.

Match 4
27 December 2025
18:00 (N)
Scorecard

Noakhali Express; 143/7 (20 overs)	v	Sylhet Titans; 144/9 (20 overs)
Mahidul Islam Ankon 61* (51); Khaled Ahmed 4/23 (4 overs)		Parvez Hossain Emon 60 (41); Mehedi Hasan Rana 4/34 (4 overs)

Sylhet Titans won by 1 wicket
Sylhet International Cricket Stadium, Sylhet
Umpires: Muhammad Kamruzzaman (Ban) and Asif Yaqoob (Pak)
Player of the match: Khaled Ahmed (Sylhet Titans)

- Sylhet Titans won the toss and elected to field.
- Mehedi Hasan Rana (Noakhali Express) took his first hat-trick in T20s, overall ninth in BPL and the first in this season.

Match 7
1 January 2026
13:00
Scorecard

Sylhet Titans; 173/5 (20 overs)	v	Dhaka Capitals; 167/8 (20 overs)
Azmatullah Omarzai 50* (24); Salman Mirza 2/46 (4 overs)		Shamim Hossain 81* (43); Azmatullah Omarzai 3/40 (4 overs)

Sylhet Titans won by 6 runs
Sylhet International Cricket Stadium, Sylhet
Umpires: Morshed Ali Khan (Ban) and Sharfuddoula (Ban)
Player of the match: Azmatullah Omarzai (Sylhet Titans)

- Dhaka Capitals won the toss and elected to field.

Match 10
2 January 2026
19:00 (N)
Scorecard

Sylhet Titans; 144/8 (20 overs)	v	Rangpur Riders; 145/4 (18.5 overs)
Afif Hossain 46 (31); Faheem Ashraf 3/18 (4 overs)		Litton Das 35 (25); Ethan Brookes 1/13 (1 over)

Rangpur Riders won by 6 wickets
Sylhet International Cricket Stadium, Sylhet
Umpires: Asif Yaqoob (Pak) and Muhammad Kamruzzaman (Ban)
Player of the match: Mahmudullah (Rangpur Riders)

- Rangpur Riders won the toss and elected to field.
- Mustafizur Rahman (Rangpur Riders) completed 400 wickets in his T20 career.

Match 11
4 January 2026
13:00
Scorecard

Sylhet Titans; 126/7 (20 overs)	v	Chattogram Royals; 130/1 (16 overs)
Azmatullah Omarzai 44 (41); Mahedi Hasan 2/18 (4 overs)		Adam Rossington 73* (53); Rahatul Ferdous 1/29 (3 overs)

Chattogram Royals won by 9 wickets
Sylhet International Cricket Stadium, Sylhet
Umpires: Gazi Sohel (Ban) and Sajedul Islam (Ban)
Player of the match: Mohammad Naim (Chattogram Royals)

- Chattogram Royals won the toss and elected to field.
- Match postponed from 30 December 2025 to 4 January 2026 due to the passing away of the ex-Prime Minister of Bangladesh, Khaleda Zia.

Match 13
5 January 2026
13:00
Scorecard

Noakhali Express; 61 (14.2 overs)	v	Sylhet Titans; 62/4 (8.4 overs)
Mahidul Islam Ankon 25 (32); Nasum Ahmed 5/7 (4 overs)		Tawfique Khan 32 (18); Zahir Khan 3/8 (1.4 overs)

Sylhet Titans won by 6 wickets
Sylhet International Cricket Stadium, Sylhet
Umpires: Ruchira Palliyaguruge (SL) and Sharfuddoula (Ban)
Player of the match: Nasum Ahmed (Sylhet Titans)

- Noakhali Express won the toss and elected to bat.

Match 16
7 January 2026
18:00 (N)
Scorecard

Chattogram Royals; 198/5 (20 overs)	v	Sylhet Titans; 184 (19.4 overs)
Adam Rossington 49 (38); Ruyel Miah 3/41 (4 overs)		Afif Hossain 46 (33); Aamir Jamal 4/34 (4 overs)

Chattogram Royals won by 14 runs
Sylhet International Cricket Stadium, Sylhet
Umpires: Asif Yaqoob (Pak) and Morshed Ali Khan (Ban)
Player of the match: Mahmudul Hasan Joy (Chattogram Royals)

- Sylhet Titans won the toss and elected to field.

Match 18
8 January 2026
18:00 (N)
Scorecard

Sylhet Titans; 180/6 (20 overs)	v	Dhaka Capitals; 160/8 (20 overs)
Ariful Islam 38 (29); Ziaur Rahman 3/35 (4 overs)		Rahmanullah Gurbaz 51 (44); Salman Irshad 3/25 (4 overs)

Sylhet Titans won by 20 runs
Sylhet International Cricket Stadium, Sylhet
Umpires: Ruchira Palliyaguruge (SL) and Tanvir Ahmed (Ban)
Player of the match: Moeen Ali (Sylhet Titans)

- Dhaka Capitals won the toss and elected to field.
- Ariful Islam (Sylhet Titans) made his BPL debut.
- Sabbir Rahman (Dhaka Capitals) completed 2000 runs in his BPL career.

Match 23
12 January 2026
13:00
Scorecard

Rangpur Riders; 114 (19.1 overs)	v	Sylhet Titans; 119/4 (17.3 overs)
Khushdil Shah 30 (24); Nasum Ahmed 3/19 (4 overs)		Parvez Hossain Emon 52* (41); Nahid Rana 2/18 (3 overs)

Sylhet Titans won by 6 wickets
Sylhet International Cricket Stadium, Sylhet
Umpires: Ali Arman (Ban) and Ruchira Palliyaguruge (SL)
Player of the match: Nasum Ahmed (Sylhet Titans)

- Sylhet Titans won the toss and elected to field.
- Parvez Hossain Emon (Sylhet Titans) completed 2000 runs in his T20 career.

Match 26
16 January 2026 (Note: Match rescheduled due to local cricketers' boycott.)
19:00 (N)
Scorecard

Rajshahi Warriors; 147/8 (20 overs)	v	Sylhet Titans; 142/9 (20 overs)
Mushfiqur Rahim 40 (30); Nasum Ahmed 2/30 (4 overs)		Parvez Hossain Emon 41 (30); Ripon Mondol 4/34 (4 overs)

Rajshahi Warriors won by 5 runs
Sher-e-Bangla National Cricket Stadium, Dhaka
Umpires: Gazi Sohel (Ban) and Ruchira Palliyaguruge (SL)
Player of the match: Ripon Mondol (Rajshahi Warriors)

- Sylhet Titans won the toss and elected to field.
- Shohidul Islam (Sylhet Titans) completed 100 wickets in his T20 career.

== Playoffs ==
Eliminator

Match 31
20 January 2026
13:00
Scorecard

Rangpur Riders; 111/9 (20 overs)	v	Sylhet Titans; 112/7 (20 overs)
Mahmudullah 33 (26); Khaled Ahmed 4/14 (4 overs)		Sam Billings 29 (40); Aliss Islam 2/18 (4 overs)

Sylhet Titans won by 3 wickets
Sher-e-Bangla National Cricket Stadium, Dhaka
Umpires: Gazi Sohel (Ban) and Asif Yaqoob (Pak)

- Sylhet Titans won the toss and elected to field.

Qualifier 2

Match 33
21 January 2026
18:00 (N)
Scorecard

Rajshahi Warriors; 165/9 (20 overs)	v	Sylhet Titans; 153/8 (20 overs)
Kane Williamson 45* (38); Salman Irshad 3/23 (4 overs)		Parvez Hossain Emon 48 (34); Binura Fernando 4/19 (4 overs)

Rajshahi Warriors won by 12 runs
Sher-e-Bangla National Cricket Stadium, Dhaka
Umpires: Asif Yaqoob (Pak) and Tanvir Ahmed (Ban)
Player of the match: Binura Fernando (Rajshahi Warriors)

- Sylhet Titans won the toss and elected to field.

== See also ==
- 2025–26 Chattogram Royals season
- 2025–26 Dhaka Capitals season
- 2025–26 Rajshahi Warriors season
- 2025–26 Rangpur Riders season
- 2025–26 Noakhali Express season
