= 2025–26 Rajshahi Warriors season =

Bangladesh Premier League team season

Rajshahi Warriors
2025–26 season
- Coach: Hannan Sarkar
- Captain: Nazmul Hossain Shanto
- BPL League: Champions
- Most runs: Najmul Hossain Shanto (355)
- Most wickets: Binura Fernando (18)
- Most catches: Tanzid Hasan (11)
- Most wicket-keeping dismissals: Mushfiqur Rahim (6)

The 2025–26 season is the 8th season for the Bangladesh Premier League franchise, Rajshahi Warriors. They as Durbar Rajshahi were one of the seven teams participating in the last season and became 5th there. They became champion for the first time in the 2019–20 season as Rajshahi Royals, beating Khulna Tigers in the final. In November 2025, the team was acquired by Nabil Group of Industries and renamed. They won their second title this season by beating Chattogram Royals in the final.

== Coaching panel ==
Position	Name
Head coach	Hannan Sarkar
Assistant coach	Rajin Saleh
Batting coach	
Bowling coach	Tareq Aziz
Team Manager	Hasanuzzaman Jhoru
Trainer	Mir Ifte Karul Islam
Physio	Mojadded Sani

== Squad ==
The Rajshahi Warriors squad for the 2025–26 season is:

Name	Nationality	Batting style	Bowling style	Notes
Batters
Nazmul Hossain Shanto	Bangladesh	Left-handed	Right-arm off-break	Captain
Tanzid Hasan	Bangladesh	Left-handed	—N/a	
Sahibzada Farhan	Pakistan	Right-handed	—N/a	Overseas
Pathum Nissanka	Sri Lanka	Right-handed	—N/a	Overseas
Kane Williamson	New Zealand	Right-handed	Right-arm off break	Overseas
Yasir Ali	Bangladesh	Right-handed	—N/a	
Muhammad Waseem	United Arab Emirates	Right-handed	Right-arm medium	Overseas
Wicket-keepers
Mushfiqur Rahim	Bangladesh	Right-handed	—N/a	
Akbar Ali	Bangladesh	Right-handed	—N/a	
Shakhir Hossain	Bangladesh	Right-handed	—N/a	
All rounders
Jishan Alam	Bangladesh	Right-handed	Right-arm off-break	—N/a
SM Meherob	Bangladesh	Left-handed	Right-arm off-break	—N/a
Mohammad Nawaz	Pakistan	Left-handed	Slow left-arm orthodox	Overseas
Dushan Hemantha	Sri Lanka	Right-handed	Right-arm leg-break	Overseas
Hussain Talat	Pakistan	Left-handed	Right-arm medium fast	Overseas
Jahandad Khan	Pakistan	Left-handed	Left-arm medium fast	Overseas
Wasi Siddiquee	Bangladesh	Left-handed	Right-arm leg-break	—N/a
James Neesham	New Zealand	Left-handed	Right-arm medium	Overseas
Ryan Burl	Zimbabwe	Left-handed	Right-arm leg-break	Overseas
Spin bowlers
Sandeep Lamichhane	Nepal	Right-handed	Right-arm leg-break	Overseas
Hasan Murad	Bangladesh	Right-handed	Slow left-arm orthodox	—N/a
MD Rubel	Bangladesh	Right-handed	Right-arm off-break	—N/a
Pace bowlers
Binura Fernando	Sri Lanka	Right-handed	Left-arm medium fast	Overseas
Tanzim Hasan Sakib	Bangladesh	Right-handed	Right-arm medium fast	—N/a
Ripon Mondol	Bangladesh	Right-handed	Right-arm medium fast	—N/a
Abdul Gaffar Saqlain	Bangladesh	Right-handed	Right-arm medium fast	—N/a
Robiul Haque	Bangladesh	Right-handed	Right-arm medium fast	—N/a

== League stage ==
=== Points table ===
Pos	Team	Pld	W	L	NR	Pts	NRR	Qualification
1	Rajshahi Warriors (C)	10	8	2	0	16	0.335	Advanced to Qualifier 1
2	Chattogram Royals (R)	10	6	4	0	12	0.497	Advanced to Qualifier 1
3	Rangpur Riders (4th)	10	6	4	0	12	0.220	Advanced to Eliminator
4	Sylhet Titans (3rd)	10	5	5	0	10	0.373	Advanced to Eliminator
5	Dhaka Capitals	10	3	7	0	6	−0.381	Eliminated
6	Noakhali Express	10	2	8	0	4	−1.038	Eliminated

Source: ESPNcricinfo & Cricbuzz
(C) Champions; (R) Runners up

=== Win-loss table ===
Team	1	2	3	4	5	6	7	8	9	10	Q1	El	Q2	F	Pos.
Rajshahi Warriors	Sylhet; 8 wickets	Dhaka; 5 wickets	Noakhali; 6 wickets	Rangpur; Super Over	Noakhali; 4 wickets	Chattogram; 2 wickets	Rangpur; 7 wickets	Dhaka; 7 wickets	Sylhet; 5 runs	Chattogram; 3 wickets	Chattogram; 7 wickets	—N/a	Sylhet; 12 runs	Chattogram; 63 runs	Champions

Team's results→	Won	Tied	Lost	N/R

=== Matches ===
Match 1
26 December 2025
15:00 (D/N)
Scorecard

Sylhet Titans; 190/5 (20 overs)	v	Rajshahi Warriors; 192/2 (19.4 overs)
Parvez Hossain Emon 65* (33); Sandeep Lamichhane 2/38 (4 overs)		Najmul Hossain Shanto 101* (60); Khaled Ahmed 1/30 (3 overs)

Rajshahi Warriors won by 8 wickets
Sylhet International Cricket Stadium, Sylhet
Umpires: Tanvir Ahmed (Ban) and Sharfuddoula (Ban)
Player of the match: Najmul Hossain Shanto (Rajshahi Warriors)

- Rajshahi Warriors won the toss and elected to field.

Match 3
27 December 2025
13:00
Scorecard

Rajshahi Warriors; 132/8 (20 overs)	v	Dhaka Capitals; 134/5 (18.5 overs)
Najmul Hossain Shanto 37 (28); Imad Wasim 3/16 (4 overs)		Abdullah Al Mamun 45 (39); Mohammad Nawaz 3/21 (4 overs)

Dhaka Capitals won by 5 wickets
Sylhet International Cricket Stadium, Sylhet
Umpires: Morshed Ali Khan (Ban) and Ruchira Palliyaguruge (SL)
Player of the match: Imad Wasim (Dhaka Capitals)

- Dhaka Capitals won the toss and elected to field.

Match 6
29 December 2025
18:00 (N)
Scorecard

Noakhali Express; 124/8 (20 overs)	v	Rajshahi Warriors; 125/4 (17.5 overs)
Haider Ali 33 (28); Ripon Mondol 4/13 (4 overs)		Tanzid Hasan 29 (20); Hasan Mahmud 2/19 (4 overs)

Rajshahi Warriors won by 6 wickets
Sylhet International Cricket Stadium, Sylhet
Umpires: Ali Arman (Ban) and Sharfuddoula (Ban)
Player of the match: Ripon Mondol (Rajshahi Warriors)

- Rajshahi Warriors won the toss and elected to field.
- Haider Ali started captaining Noakhali Express from this match as their previously selected captain Shykat Ali didn't feature.

Match 8
1 January 2026
18:00 (N)
Scorecard

Rajshahi Warriors; 159/8 (20 overs)	v	Rangpur Riders; 159/6 (20 overs)
Sahibzada Farhan 65 (46); Faheem Ashraf 3/43 (4 overs)		Dawid Malan 63* (50); SM Meherob 2/17 (4 overs)

Match tied
(Rajshahi Warriors won the Super Over)
Sylhet International Cricket Stadium, Sylhet
Umpires: Asif Yaqoob (Pak) and Gazi Sohel (Ban)
Player of the match: Ripon Mondol (Rajshahi Warriors)

- Rangpur Riders won the toss and elected to field.
- Super Over: Rangpur Riders 6/2, Rajshahi Warriors 10/0.

Match 17
8 January 2026
13:00
Scorecard

Noakhali Express; 151/5 (20 overs)	v	Rajshahi Warriors; 152/6 (19 overs)
Soumya Sarkar 59 (43); Ripon Mondol 2/27 (4 overs)		Muhammad Waseem 60 (35); Mehedi Hasan Rana 3/25 (4 overs)

Rajshahi Warriors won by 4 wickets
Sylhet International Cricket Stadium, Sylhet
Umpires: Muhammad Kamruzzaman (Ban) and Sharfuddoula (Ban)
Player of the match: Muhammad Waseem (Rajshahi Warriors)

- Rajshahi Warriors won the toss and elected to field.

Match 19
9 January 2026
14:00
Scorecard

Rajshahi Warriors; 128/9 (20 overs)	v	Chattogram Royals; 129/8 (20 overs)
Muhammad Waseem 19 (14); Aamir Jamal 3/23 (4 overs)		Hassan Nawaz 35* (36); Binura Fernando 3/18 (4 overs)

Chattogram Royals won by 2 wickets
Sylhet International Cricket Stadium, Sylhet
Umpires: Gazi Sohel (Ban) and Ruchira Palliyaguruge (SL)
Player of the match: Aamir Jamal (Chattogram Royals)

- Chattogram Royals won the toss and elected to field.
- Binura Fernando (Rajshahi Warriors) completed 150 wickets in his T20 career.

Match 21
11 January 2026
13:00
Scorecard

Rangpur Riders; 178/4 (20 overs)	v	Rajshahi Warriors; 179/3 (19.1 overs)
Tawhid Hridoy 97* (56); Sandeep Lamichhane 1/21 (4 overs)		Muhammad Waseem 87* (59); Akif Javed 2/43 (4 overs)

Rajshahi Warriors won by 7 wickets
Sylhet International Cricket Stadium, Sylhet
Umpires: Gazi Sohel (Ban) and Ruchira Palliyaguruge (SL)
Player of the match: Najmul Hossain Shanto (Rajshahi Warriors)

- Rajshahi Warriors won the toss and elected to field.

Match 24
12 January 2026
18:00 (N)
Scorecard

Dhaka Capitals; 131 (20 overs)	v	Rajshahi Warriors; 132/3 (16.1 overs)
Usman Khan 41 (27); Abdul Gaffar Saqlain 4/24 (4 overs)		Tanzid Hasan 76 (43); Saif Hassan 1/17 (4 overs)

Rajshahi Warriors won by 7 wickets
Sylhet International Cricket Stadium, Sylhet
Umpires: Morshed Ali Khan (Ban) and Tanvir Ahmed (Ban)
Player of the match: Tanzid Hasan (Rajshahi Warriors)

- Dhaka Capitals won the toss and elected to bat.
- Ripon Mondol (Rajshahi Warriors) took the first hat-trick in his BPL career, overall eleventh in BPL and the third in this season.

Match 26
16 January 2026 (Note: Match rescheduled due to local cricketers' boycott.)
19:00 (N)
Scorecard

Rajshahi Warriors; 147/8 (20 overs)	v	Sylhet Titans; 142/9 (20 overs)
Mushfiqur Rahim 40 (30); Nasum Ahmed 2/30 (4 overs)		Parvez Hossain Emon 41 (30); Ripon Mondol 4/34 (4 overs)

Rajshahi Warriors won by 5 runs
Sher-e-Bangla National Cricket Stadium, Dhaka
Umpires: Gazi Sohel (Ban) and Ruchira Palliyaguruge (SL)
Player of the match: Ripon Mondol (Rajshahi Warriors)

- Sylhet Titans won the toss and elected to field.
- Shohidul Islam (Sylhet Titans) completed 100 wickets in his T20 career.

Match 28
17 January 2026
18:00 (N)
Scorecard

Chattogram Royals; 125 (19.5 overs)	v	Rajshahi Warriors; 126/7 (19.3 overs)
Asif Ali 39 (24); Tanzim Hasan Sakib 4/17 (4 overs)		Akbar Ali 48 (40); Shoriful Islam 4/13 (4 overs)

Rajshahi Warriors won by 3 wickets
Sher-e-Bangla National Cricket Stadium, Dhaka
Umpires: Asif Yaqoob (Pak) and Muhammad Kamruzzaman (Ban)
Player of the match: Akbar Ali (Rajshahi Warriors)

- Rajshahi Warriors won the toss and elected to field.

== Playoffs ==
Qualifier 1

Match 32
20 January 2026
18:00 (N)
Scorecard

Rajshahi Warriors; 133 (20 overs)	v	Chattogram Royals; 134/4 (19.3 overs)
Tanzid Hasan 41 (37); Mahedi Hasan 2/20 (4 overs)		Mirza Baig 45 (47); Abdul Gaffar Saqlain 2/20 (4 overs)

Chattogram Royals won by 6 wickets
Sher-e-Bangla National Cricket Stadium, Dhaka
Umpires: Tanvir Ahmed (Ban) Ruchira Palliyaguruge (SL)
Player of the match: Mahedi Hasan (Chattogram Royals)

- Chattogram Royals won the toss and elected to field.

Qualifier 2

Match 33
21 January 2026
18:00 (N)
Scorecard

Rajshahi Warriors; 165/9 (20 overs)	v	Sylhet Titans; 153/8 (20 overs)
Kane Williamson 45* (38); Salman Irshad 3/23 (4 overs)		Parvez Hossain Emon 48 (34); Binura Fernando 4/19 (4 overs)

Rajshahi Warriors won by 12 runs
Sher-e-Bangla National Cricket Stadium, Dhaka
Umpires: Asif Yaqoob (Pak) and Tanvir Ahmed (Ban)
Player of the match: Binura Fernando (Rajshahi Warriors)

- Sylhet Titans won the toss and elected to field.

Final

Match 34
23 January 2026
18:00 (N)
Scorecard

Rajshahi Warriors; 174/4 (20 overs)	v	Chattogram Royals; 111 (17.5 overs)
Tanzid Hasan 100 (62); Mukidul Islam 2/20 (4 overs)		Mirza Tahir Baig 39 (36); Binura Fernando 4/9 (3 overs)

Rajshahi Warriors won by 63 runs
Sher-e-Bangla National Cricket Stadium, Dhaka
Umpires: Gazi Sohel (Ban) and Ruchira Palliyaguruge (SL)
Player of the match: Tanzid Hasan (Rajshahi Warriors)

- Chattogram Royals won the toss and elected to field.

== See also ==
- 2025–26 Chattogram Royals season
- 2025–26 Dhaka Capitals season
- 2025–26 Rangpur Riders season
- 2025–26 Sylhet Titans season
- 2025–26 Noakhali Express season
