= 2025–26 Dhaka Capitals season =

Bangladesh Premier League team season

Dhaka Capitals
2025–26 season
- Coach: Toby Radford
- Ground(s): Sher-e-Bangla National Cricket Stadium, Dhaka
- BPL League: 5th
- Most runs: Mohammad Mithun (169)
- Most wickets: Mohammad Saifuddin (12)
- Most catches: Sabbir Rahman (6)
- Most wicket-keeping dismissals: Mohammad Mithun (7)

The 2025–26 season is the 12th season for the Bangladesh Premier League franchise Dhaka Capitals. They were one of the seven teams that participated in the tournament in 2025, having changed their name from Durdanto Dhaka. The team is owned by the Champions Sports Ltd, partnered with Shakib Khan & Remark HB Limited. They have won the title 3 times in 2012, 2013 & 2016.They were one of the six teams participating in the contest that season.

== Coaching Panel ==
Position	Name
Mentor	Shoaib Akhtar
Head coach	Toby Radford
Assistant coach	Mahbub Ali Zaki (Note: Passed away in field while coaching due to heart attack.)
Batting coach	
Bowling coach	
Team Analyst	Sheikh Mohsin Pervaiz

== Squad ==
The squad of Dhaka Capitals for 2025–26 season is:

Shirt no.	Name	Nationality	Batting style	Bowling style	Notes
Batters
13	Saif Hassan	Bangladesh	Right-handed	Right-arm off-break	—N/a
1	Sabbir Rahman	Bangladesh	Right-handed	Right-arm leg-break	—N/a
	Alex Hales	England	Right-handed	Right-arm medium	Overseas
	Zubaid Akbari	Afghanistan	Left-handed	Slow left-arm orthodox	Overseas
	Choudry Share Ali	Sweden	Right-handed	Right-arm off-break	Overseas
Wicket-keepers
22	Mohammad Mithun	Bangladesh	Right-handed	Right-arm off-break	—N/a
21	Rahmanullah Gurbaz	Afghanistan	Right-handed	—N/a	Overseas
	Usman Khan	Pakistan	Right-handed	Right-arm off-break	Overseas
	Irfan Sukkur	Bangladesh	Left-handed	—N/a	
All-rounders
55	Abdullah Al Mamun	Bangladesh	Left-handed	Right-arm medium	—N/a
	Tofael Ahmed	Bangladesh	Right-handed	Right-arm medium	—N/a
	Moinul Islam	Bangladesh	Left-handed	Slow left-arm orthodox	—N/a
	Dasun Shanaka	Sri Lanka	Right-handed	Right-arm medium fast	Overseas
29	Shamim Hossain	Bangladesh	Left-handed	Right-arm off-break	—N/a
69	Nasir Hossain	Bangladesh	Right-handed	Right-arm off-break	—N/a
74	Mohammad Saifuddin	Bangladesh	Left-handed	Right-arm fast medium	—N/a
9	Imad Wasim	Pakistan	Left-handed	Slow left-arm orthodox	Overseas
	Odean Smith	West Indies	Right-handed	Right-arm medium fast	Overseas
	Arif Hussain	Sweden	Left-handed	Left-arm medium	Overseas
Spin bowlers
12	Taijul Islam	Bangladesh	Left-handed	Slow left-arm orthodox	—N/a
	Jayed Ullah	Bangladesh	Right-handed	Slow left-arm orthodox	—N/a
Pace bowlers
3	Taskin Ahmed	Bangladesh	Left-handed	Right-arm fast-medium	—N/a
	Maruf Mridha	Bangladesh	Left-handed	Left-arm fast medium	—N/a
65	Ziaur Rahman	Afghanistan	Right-handed	Right-arm medium fast	Overseas
	Salman Mirza	Pakistan	Right-handed	Left-arm medium	Overseas
	Khuzaima Tanveer	United Arab Emirates	Right-handed	Right-arm fast	Overseas

== League stage ==
=== Points Table ===
Pos	Team	Pld	W	L	NR	Pts	NRR	Qualification
1	Rajshahi Warriors (C)	10	8	2	0	16	0.335	Advanced to Qualifier 1
2	Chattogram Royals (R)	10	6	4	0	12	0.497	Advanced to Qualifier 1
3	Rangpur Riders (4th)	10	6	4	0	12	0.220	Advanced to Eliminator
4	Sylhet Titans (3rd)	10	5	5	0	10	0.373	Advanced to Eliminator
5	Dhaka Capitals	10	3	7	0	6	−0.381	Eliminated
6	Noakhali Express	10	2	8	0	4	−1.038	Eliminated

Source: ESPNcricinfo & Cricbuzz
(C) Champions; (R) Runners up

=== Win-loss table ===
Team	1	2	3	4	5	6	7	8	9	10	Q1	El	Q2	F	Pos.
Dhaka Capitals	Rajshahi; 5 wickets	Sylhet; 6 runs	Chattogram; 10 wickets	Rangpur; 5 runs	Noakhali; 7 wickets	Sylhet; 20 runs	Noakhali; 41 runs	Rajshahi; 7 wickets	Rangpur; 11 runs	Chattogram; 42 runs	—N/a				5th

Team's results→	Won	Tied	Lost	N/R

=== Matches ===
Match 3
27 December 2025
13:00
Scorecard

Rajshahi Warriors; 132/8 (20 overs)	v	Dhaka Capitals; 134/5 (18.5 overs)
Najmul Hossain Shanto 37 (28); Imad Wasim 3/16 (4 overs)		Abdullah Al Mamun 45 (39); Mohammad Nawaz 3/21 (4 overs)

Dhaka Capitals won by 5 wickets
Sylhet International Cricket Stadium, Sylhet
Umpires: Morshed Ali Khan (Ban) and Ruchira Palliyaguruge (SL)
Player of the match: Imad Wasim (Dhaka Capitals)

- Dhaka Capitals won the toss and elected to field.

Match 7
1 January 2026
13:00
Scorecard

Sylhet Titans; 173/5 (20 overs)	v	Dhaka Capitals; 167/8 (20 overs)
Azmatullah Omarzai 50* (24); Salman Mirza 2/46 (4 overs)		Shamim Hossain 81* (43); Azmatullah Omarzai 3/40 (4 overs)

Sylhet Titans won by 6 runs
Sylhet International Cricket Stadium, Sylhet
Umpires: Morshed Ali Khan (Ban) and Sharfuddoula (Ban)
Player of the match: Azmatullah Omarzai (Sylhet Titans)

- Dhaka Capitals won the toss and elected to field.

Match 9
2 January 2026
14:00
Scorecard

Dhaka Capitals; 122 (19.4 overs)	v	Chattogram Royals; 123/0 (12.4 overs)
Mohammad Saifuddin 33* (25); Tanvir Islam 3/8 (4 overs)		Adam Rossington 60* (36)

Chattogram Royals won by 10 wickets
Sylhet International Cricket Stadium, Sylhet
Umpires: Ali Arman (Ban) and Masudur Rahman (Ban)
Player of the match: Adam Rossington (Chattogram Royals)

- Chattogram Royals won the toss and elected to field.

Match 12
4 January 2026
18:00 (N)
Scorecard

Rangpur Riders; 155/5 (20 overs)	v	Dhaka Capitals; 150/4 (20 overs)
Mahmudullah 51 (41); Ziaur Rahman 2/35 (4 overs)		Mohammad Mithun 56* (38); Kyle Mayers 1/7 (2 overs)

Rangpur Riders won by 5 runs
Sylhet International Cricket Stadium, Sylhet
Umpires: Ruchira Palliyaguruge (SL) and Tanvir Ahmed (Ban)
Player of the match: Mahmudullah (Rangpur Riders)

- Dhaka Capitals won the toss and elected to field.
- Match postponed from 30 December 2025 to 4 January 2026 due to the passing away of the ex-Prime Minister of Bangladesh, Khaleda Zia.

Match 15
7 January 2026
13:00
Scorecard

Noakhali Express; 133/6 (20 overs)	v	Dhaka Capitals; 134/3 (14.1 overs)
Haider Ali 47 (36); Abdullah Al Mamun 1/6 (1 over)		Nasir Hossain 90* (50); Hasan Mahmud 2/17 (3 overs)

Dhaka Capitals won by 7 wickets
Sylhet International Cricket Stadium, Sylhet
Umpires: Ruchira Palliyaguruge (SL) and Sajedul Islam (Ban)
Player of the match: Nasir Hossain (Dhaka Capitals)

- Dhaka Capitals won the toss and elected to field.

Match 18
8 January 2026
18:00 (N)
Scorecard

Sylhet Titans; 180/6 (20 overs)	v	Dhaka Capitals; 160/8 (20 overs)
Ariful Islam 38 (29); Ziaur Rahman 3/35 (4 overs)		Rahmanullah Gurbaz 51 (44); Salman Irshad 3/25 (4 overs)

Sylhet Titans won by 20 runs
Sylhet International Cricket Stadium, Sylhet
Umpires: Ruchira Palliyaguruge (SL) and Tanvir Ahmed (Ban)
Player of the match: Moeen Ali (Sylhet Titans)

- Dhaka Capitals won the toss and elected to field.
- Ariful Islam (Sylhet Titans) made his BPL debut.
- Sabbir Rahman (Dhaka Capitals) completed 2000 runs in his BPL career.

Match 22
11 January 2026
18:00 (N)
Scorecard

Noakhali Express; 184/7 (20 overs)	v	Dhaka Capitals; 143 (18.2 overs)
Hassan Eisakhil 92 (60); Mohammad Saifuddin 2/23 (3 overs)		Mohammad Saifuddin 34 (20); Hasan Mahmud 2/21 (3.2 overs)

Noakhali Express won by 41 runs
Sylhet International Cricket Stadium, Sylhet
Umpires: Morshed Ali Khan (Ban) and Asif Yaqoob (Pak)
Player of the match: Hassan Eisakhil (Noakhali Express)

- Noakhali Express won the toss and elected to bat.
- Hassan Eisakhil (Noakhali Express) made his BPL debut.

Match 24
12 January 2026
18:00 (N)
Scorecard

Dhaka Capitals; 131 (20 overs)	v	Rajshahi Warriors; 132/3 (16.1 overs)
Usman Khan 41 (27); Abdul Gaffar Saqlain 4/24 (4 overs)		Tanzid Hasan 76 (43); Saif Hassan 1/17 (4 overs)

Rajshahi Warriors won by 7 wickets
Sylhet International Cricket Stadium, Sylhet
Umpires: Morshed Ali Khan (Ban) and Tanvir Ahmed (Ban)
Player of the match: Tanzid Hasan (Rajshahi Warriors)

- Dhaka Capitals won the toss and elected to bat.
- Ripon Mondol (Rajshahi Warriors) took the first hat-trick in his BPL career, overall eleventh in BPL and the third in this season.

Match 27
17 January 2026 (Note: Match rescheduled due to local cricketers' boycott.)
13:00
Scorecard

Rangpur Riders; 181/4 (20 overs)	v	Dhaka Capitals; 170/7 (20 overs)
Dawid Malan 78 (49); Mohammad Saifuddin 2/33 (4 overs)		Mohammad Saifuddin 58* (30); Nahid Rana 3/11 (4 overs)

Rangpur Riders won by 11 runs
Sher-e-Bangla National Cricket Stadium, Dhaka
Umpires: Morshed Ali Khan (Ban) and Sajedul Islam (BAN)
Player of the match: Dawid Malan (Rangpur Riders)

- Dhaka Capitals won the toss and elected to field.

Match 30
18 January 2026
18:00 (N)
Scorecard

Dhaka Capitals; 170 (19.5 overs)	v	Chattogram Royals; 128 (19.4 overs)
Saif Hassan 73 (44); Tanvir Islam 3/25 (4 overs)		Aamer Jamal 42 (26); Mohammad Saifuddin 4/20 (3.4 overs)

Dhaka Capitals won by 42 runs
Sher-e-Bangla National Cricket Stadium, Dhaka
Umpires: Gazi Sohel (Ban) and Muhammad Kamruzzaman (Ban)
Player of the match: Saif Hassan (Dhaka Capitals)

- Chattogram Royals won the toss and elected to field.

== See also ==
- 2025–26 Chattogram Royals season
- 2025–26 Rajshahi Warriors season
- 2025–26 Rangpur Riders season
- 2025–26 Sylhet Titans season
- 2025–26 Noakhali Express season
