= 2025–26 Rangpur Riders season =

Bangladesh Premier League team season

Rangpur Riders
2025–26 season
- Coach: Mickey Arthur
- Captain: Nurul Hasan Sohan; Litton Das (Note: Started captaining from their ninth group match.)
- Ground(s): Rangpur Stadium, Rangpur
- BPL League: 4th
- Most runs: Tawhid Hridoy (382)
- Most wickets: Mustafizur Rahman (16)
- Most catches: Litton Das (10)
- Most wicket-keeping dismissals: Nurul Hasan Sohan (12)

The 2025–26 season is the 10th season so far for the Bangladesh Premier League franchise Rangpur Riders. They were one of the six teams that participated in the 2025–26 Bangladesh Premier League. They won the title only a single time in 2017–18 season. This franchise is owned by Toggi Sports.

== Coaching Panel ==
Position	Name
Head coach	Mickey Arthur
Assistant coach	Mohammad Ashraful
Batting coach	Shahriar Nafees
Spin Bowling coach	Mohammad Rafique

== Squad ==
The squad of Rangpur Riders for 2025–26 season is:

Name	Nationality	Batting style	Bowling style	Notes
Batters
Tawhid Hridoy	Bangladesh	Right-handed	—N/a	
Dawid Malan	England	Left-handed	Right-arm leg-break	Overseas
Khawaja Nafay	Pakistan	Right-handed	Right-arm off-break	Overseas
Wayne Madsen	Italy	Right-handed	Right-arm off-break	Overseas
Emilio Gay	Italy	Left-handed	Right-arm medium	Overseas
Iftikhar Hossain Ifti	Bangladesh	Left-handed	—N/a	
Wicket-keepers
Nurul Hasan Sohan	Bangladesh	Right-handed	—N/a	Captain
Litton Das	Bangladesh	Right-handed	—N/a	Captain
Muhammad Akhlaq	Pakistan	Right-handed	Right-arm medium	Overseas
All-rounders
Mahmudullah	Bangladesh	Right-handed	Right-arm off-break	—N/a
Khushdil Shah	Pakistan	Left-handed	Slow left-arm orthodox	Overseas
Kyle Mayers	West Indies	Left-handed	Right-arm medium	Overseas
Faheem Ashraf	Pakistan	Left-handed	Right-arm fast-medium	Overseas
Nayeem Hasan	Bangladesh	Right-handed	Right-arm off-break	—N/a
Mehedi Hasan Sohag	Bangladesh	Right-handed	Right-arm leg-break	—N/a
Iftikhar Ahmed	Pakistan	Right-handed	Right-arm off-break	Overseas
Pace bowlers
Mustafizur Rahman	Bangladesh	Left-handed	Left-arm fast-medium	—N/a
Akif Javed	Pakistan	Right-handed	Left-arm fast	Overseas
Nahid Rana	Bangladesh	Right-handed	Right-arm fast	—N/a
~~Kamrul Islam Rabbi~~	Bangladesh	Right-handed	Right-arm medium fast	—N/a
Mrittunjoy Chowdhury	Bangladesh	Left-handed	Left-arm fast-medium	—N/a
Abdul Halim	Bangladesh	Right-handed	Right-arm medium	—N/a
Spin bowlers
Rakibul Hasan	Bangladesh	Left-handed	Slow left-arm orthodox	—N/a
Sufiyan Muqeem	Pakistan	Left-handed	Left-arm Chinaman	Overseas
Aliss Islam	Bangladesh	Right-handed	Right-arm off-break	—N/a

== League stage ==
=== Points Table ===
Pos	Team	Pld	W	L	NR	Pts	NRR	Qualification
1	Rajshahi Warriors (C)	10	8	2	0	16	0.335	Advanced to Qualifier 1
2	Chattogram Royals (R)	10	6	4	0	12	0.497	Advanced to Qualifier 1
3	Rangpur Riders (4th)	10	6	4	0	12	0.220	Advanced to Eliminator
4	Sylhet Titans (3rd)	10	5	5	0	10	0.373	Advanced to Eliminator
5	Dhaka Capitals	10	3	7	0	6	−0.381	Eliminated
6	Noakhali Express	10	2	8	0	4	−1.038	Eliminated

Source: ESPNcricinfo & Cricbuzz
(C) Champions; (R) Runners up

=== Win-loss table ===
Team	1	2	3	4	5	6	7	8	9	10	Q1	El	Q2	F	Pos.
Rangpur Riders	Chattogram; 7 wickets	Rajshahi; Super Over	Sylhet; 6 wickets	Dhaka; 5 runs	Chattogram; 5 wickets	Noakhali; 9 runs	Rajshahi; 7 wickets	Sylhet; 6 wickets	Dhaka; 11 runs	Noakhali; 8 wickets	—N/a	Sylhet; 3 wickets	—N/a		4th

Team's results→	Won	Tied	Lost	N/R

=== Matches ===
Match 5
29 December 2025
13:00
Scorecard

Chattogram Royals; 102 (17.5 overs)	v	Rangpur Riders; 107/3 (15 overs)
Mohammad Naim 39 (20); Faheem Ashraf 5/17 (3.5 overs)		Dawid Malan 51 (48); Mukidul Islam 2/5 (2 overs)

Rangpur Riders won by 7 wickets
Sylhet International Cricket Stadium, Sylhet
Umpires: Sajedul Islam (Ban) and Asif Yaqoob (Pak)
Player of the match: Faheem Ashraf (Rangpur Riders)

- Rangpur Riders won the toss and elected to field.

Match 8
1 January 2026
18:00 (N)
Scorecard

Rajshahi Warriors; 159/8 (20 overs)	v	Rangpur Riders; 159/6 (20 overs)
Sahibzada Farhan 65 (46); Faheem Ashraf 3/43 (4 overs)		Dawid Malan 63* (50); SM Meherob 2/17 (4 overs)

Match tied
(Rajshahi Warriors won the Super Over)
Sylhet International Cricket Stadium, Sylhet
Umpires: Asif Yaqoob (Pak) and Gazi Sohel (Ban)
Player of the match: Ripon Mondol (Rajshahi Warriors)

- Rangpur Riders won the toss and elected to field.
- Super Over: Rangpur Riders 6/2, Rajshahi Warriors 10/0.

Match 10
2 January 2026
19:00 (N)
Scorecard

Sylhet Titans; 144/8 (20 overs)	v	Rangpur Riders; 145/4 (18.5 overs)
Afif Hossain 46 (31); Faheem Ashraf 3/18 (4 overs)		Litton Das 35 (25); Ethan Brookes 1/13 (1 over)

Rangpur Riders won by 6 wickets
Sylhet International Cricket Stadium, Sylhet
Umpires: Asif Yaqoob (Pak) and Muhammad Kamruzzaman (Ban)
Player of the match: Mahmudullah (Rangpur Riders)

- Rangpur Riders won the toss and elected to field.
- Mustafizur Rahman (Rangpur Riders) completed 400 wickets in his T20 career.

Match 12
4 January 2026
18:00 (N)
Scorecard

Rangpur Riders; 155/5 (20 overs)	v	Dhaka Capitals; 150/4 (20 overs)
Mahmudullah 51 (41); Ziaur Rahman 2/35 (4 overs)		Mohammad Mithun 56* (38); Kyle Mayers 1/7 (2 overs)

Rangpur Riders won by 5 runs
Sylhet International Cricket Stadium, Sylhet
Umpires: Ruchira Palliyaguruge (SL) and Tanvir Ahmed (Ban)
Player of the match: Mahmudullah (Rangpur Riders)

- Dhaka Capitals won the toss and elected to field.
- Match postponed from 30 December 2025 to 4 January 2026 due to the passing away of the ex-Prime Minister of Bangladesh, Khaleda Zia.

Match 14
5 January 2026
18:00 (N)
Scorecard

Chattogram Royals; 169/5 (20 overs)	v	Rangpur Riders; 170/5 (18.5 overs)
Adam Rossington 58 (41); Akif Javed 2/29 (4 overs)		Kyle Mayers 50 (25); Shoriful Islam 3/37 (4 overs)

Rangpur Riders won by 5 wickets
Sylhet International Cricket Stadium, Sylhet
Umpires: Asif Yaqoob (Pak) and Gazi Sohel (Ban)
Player of the match: Kyle Mayers (Rangpur Riders)

- Rangpur Riders won the toss and elected to field.
- Litton Das (Rangpur Riders) completed 6000 runs in his T20 career.

Match 20
9 January 2026
19:00 (N)
Scorecard

Noakhali Express; 148 (19.5 overs)	v	Rangpur Riders; 139/9 (20 overs)
Jaker Ali 38 (37); Mustafizur Rahman 3/18 (4 overs)		Iftikhar Ahmed 37 (31); Hasan Mahmud 4/26 (4 overs)

Noakhali Express won by 9 runs
Sylhet International Cricket Stadium, Sylhet
Umpires: Asif Yaqoob (Pak) and Tanvir Ahmed (Ban)
Player of the match: Hasan Mahmud (Noakhali Express)

- Rangpur Riders won the toss and elected to field.
- Mrittunjoy Chowdhury (Rangpur Riders) took the second hat-trick in his BPL career, overall tenth in BPL and the second in this season. He became the first player to take hat-trick multiple times in BPL history.

Match 21
11 January 2026
13:00
Scorecard

Rangpur Riders; 178/4 (20 overs)	v	Rajshahi Warriors; 179/3 (19.1 overs)
Tawhid Hridoy 97* (56); Sandeep Lamichhane 1/21 (4 overs)		Muhammad Waseem 87* (59); Akif Javed 2/43 (4 overs)

Rajshahi Warriors won by 7 wickets
Sylhet International Cricket Stadium, Sylhet
Umpires: Gazi Sohel (Ban) and Ruchira Palliyaguruge (SL)
Player of the match: Najmul Hossain Shanto (Rajshahi Warriors)

- Rajshahi Warriors won the toss and elected to field.

Match 23
12 January 2026
13:00
Scorecard

Rangpur Riders; 114 (19.1 overs)	v	Sylhet Titans; 119/4 (17.3 overs)
Khushdil Shah 30 (24); Nasum Ahmed 3/19 (4 overs)		Parvez Hossain Emon 52* (41); Nahid Rana 2/18 (3 overs)

Sylhet Titans won by 6 wickets
Sylhet International Cricket Stadium, Sylhet
Umpires: Ali Arman (Ban) and Ruchira Palliyaguruge (SL)
Player of the match: Nasum Ahmed (Sylhet Titans)

- Sylhet Titans won the toss and elected to field.
- Parvez Hossain Emon (Sylhet Titans) completed 2000 runs in his T20 career.

Match 27
17 January 2026 (Note: Match rescheduled due to local cricketers' boycott.)
13:00
Scorecard

Rangpur Riders; 181/4 (20 overs)	v	Dhaka Capitals; 170/7 (20 overs)
Dawid Malan 78 (49); Mohammad Saifuddin 2/33 (4 overs)		Mohammad Saifuddin 58* (30); Nahid Rana 3/11 (4 overs)

Rangpur Riders won by 11 runs
Sher-e-Bangla National Cricket Stadium, Dhaka
Umpires: Morshed Ali Khan (Ban) and Sajedul Islam (BAN)
Player of the match: Dawid Malan (Rangpur Riders)

- Dhaka Capitals won the toss and elected to field.

Match 29
18 January 2026
13:00
Scorecard

Noakhali Express; 173/2 (20 overs)	v	Rangpur Riders; 174/2 (19.4 overs)
Hassan Eisakhil 107* (72); Aliss Islam 1/22 (4 overs)		Tawhid Hridoy 109 (63); Hasan Mahmud 1/23 (4 overs)

Rangpur Riders won by 8 wickets
Sher-e-Bangla National Cricket Stadium, Dhaka
Umpires: Ali Arman (Ban) and Ruchira Palliyaguruge (SL)
Player of the match: Tawhid Hridoy (Rangpur Riders)

- Rangpur Riders won the toss and elected to field.

== Playoffs ==
Eliminator

Match 31
20 January 2026
13:00
Scorecard

Rangpur Riders; 111/9 (20 overs)	v	Sylhet Titans; 112/7 (20 overs)
Mahmudullah 33 (26); Khaled Ahmed 4/14 (4 overs)		Sam Billings 29 (40); Aliss Islam 2/18 (4 overs)

Sylhet Titans won by 3 wickets
Sher-e-Bangla National Cricket Stadium, Dhaka
Umpires: Gazi Sohel (Ban) and Asif Yaqoob (Pak)

- Sylhet Titans won the toss and elected to field.

== See also ==
- 2025–26 Chattogram Royals season
- 2025–26 Dhaka Capitals season
- 2025–26 Rajshahi Warriors season
- 2025–26 Sylhet Titans season
- 2025–26 Noakhali Express season
