= Bangladeshi cricket team in the United Arab Emirates in 2025 =

International cricket tour

Bangladesh men's cricket team in the UAE in 2025
	United Arab Emirates	Bangladesh
- Dates: 17 – 21 May 2025
Captains	Muhammad Waseem	Litton Das

Twenty20 International series
- Results: United Arab Emirates won the 3-match series 2–1
Most runs	Muhammad Waseem (145)	Tanzid Hasan (109)
Most wickets	Muhammad Jawadullah (7)	Tanzim Hasan Sakib (4)
- Player of the series: Muhammad Waseem (UAE)

The Bangladesh men's cricket team toured the United Arab Emirates in May 2025 to play against the United Arab Emirates national team. The tour consisted of three Twenty20 International (T20I) matches. The matches were played at the Sharjah Cricket Stadium in Sharjah. In May 2025, the Emirates Cricket Board (ECB) announced the schedule of the series. The series originally had only two matches scheduled, but a third match was added to the series after the completion of the first T20I.

Bangladesh won the first T20I by 27 runs, helped by Parvez Hossain Emon's maiden T20I century. United Arab Emirates leveled the series by winning the second T20I by 2 wickets, which was their first win over Bangladesh in the format. United Arab Emirates won the third and final T20I by 7 wickets, winning the series 2–1. This was the second series victory for United Arab Emirates over a full member team and Bangladesh's third series defeat against an associate member team in the format.

== Squads ==
United Arab Emirates	Bangladesh
Muhammad Waseem (c); Haider Ali; Rahul Chopra (wk); Ethan D'Souza; Muhammad Jawadullah; Asif Khan; Matiullah Khan; Saghir Khan; Dhruv Parashar; Akif Raja; Alishan Sharafu; Aryansh Sharma (wk); Sanchit Sharma; Simranjeet Singh; Muhammad Zohaib; Zuhaib Zubair	Litton Das (c, wk); Mahedi Hasan (vc); Jaker Ali (wk); Parvez Hossain Emon (wk); Tanzid Hasan; Rishad Hossain; Shamim Hossain; Towhid Hridoy; Tanvir Islam; Hasan Mahmud; Mustafizur Rahman; Nahid Rana; Tanzim Hasan Sakib; Soumya Sarkar; Najmul Hossain Shanto; Shoriful Islam

== T20I series ==
=== 1st T20I ===
17 May 2025
19:00 (N)
Scorecard

Bangladesh; 191/7 (20 overs)	v	United Arab Emirates; 164 (20 overs)
Parvez Hossain Emon 100 (54); Muhammad Jawadullah 4/21 (4 overs)		Muhammad Waseem 54 (39); Hasan Mahmud 3/33 (4 overs)

Bangladesh won by 27 runs
Sharjah Cricket Stadium, Sharjah
Umpires: Akbar Ali (UAE) and Shiju Sam (UAE)
Player of the match: Parvez Hossain Emon (Ban)

- United Arab Emirates won the toss and elected to field.
- Haider Ali, Matiullah Khan and Muhammad Zohaib (UAE) all made their T20I debuts.
- Parvez Hossain Emon (Ban) scored his first century in T20Is.
- Parvez Hossain Emon broke the record for most sixes in an innings (9) in men's T20Is for Bangladesh, going past Rishad Hossain (7). He also broke the record for most runs scored from boundaries in an innings (74) in men's T20Is for Bangladesh, going past Tamim Iqbal (70).

=== 2nd T20I ===
19 May 2025
19:00 (N)
Scorecard

Bangladesh; 205/5 (20 overs)	v	United Arab Emirates; 206/8 (19.5 overs)
Tanzid Hasan 59 (33); Muhammad Jawadullah 3/45 (4 overs)		Muhammad Waseem 82 (42); Rishad Hossain 2/28 (4 overs)

United Arab Emirates won by 2 wickets
Sharjah Cricket Stadium, Sharjah
Umpires: Aasif Iqbal (UAE) and Shiju Sam (UAE)
Player of the match: Muhammad Waseem (UAE)

- United Arab Emirates won the toss and elected to field.
- Saghir Khan (UAE) and Nahid Rana (Ban) both made their T20I debuts.
- This was United Arab Emirates' first win against Bangladesh in men's T20Is.

=== 3rd T20I ===
21 May 2025
19:00 (N)
Scorecard

Bangladesh; 162/9 (20 overs)	v	United Arab Emirates; 166/3 (19.1 overs)
Jaker Ali 41 (34); Haider Ali 3/7 (4 overs)		Alishan Sharafu 68* (47); Shoriful Islam 1/24 (4 overs)

United Arab Emirates won by 7 wickets
Sharjah Cricket Stadium, Sharjah
Umpires: Akbar Ali (UAE) and Aasif Iqbal (UAE)
Player of the match: Alishan Sharafu (UAE)

- United Arab Emirates won the toss and elected to field.
- Ethan D'Souza (UAE) made his T20I debut.
