= Sylhet Titans =

Bangladesh Premier League cricket team

- সিলেট টাইটান্স
- League: Bangladesh Premier League

Personnel
- Captain: Mehidy Hasan Miraz
- Coach: Sohel Islam
- Owner: Cricket With Sami

Team information
- City: Sylhet, Bangladesh
- Founded: 2012; 14 years ago Sylhet Royals); 2015 (as Sylhet Super Stars); 2017 (as Sylhet Sixers); 2019 (as Sylhet Thunder); 2021 (as Sylhet Sunrisers); 2023 (as Sylhet Strikers); 2026 (as Sylhet Titans)
- Home ground: Sylhet International Cricket Stadium, Sylhet
- Capacity: 18,500

History
- Bangladesh Premier League wins: 0
- Official website: mysylhettitans.com
T20I kit

Sylhet Titans (Bengali: সিলেট টাইটান্স) is a professional franchise cricket team that competes in the Bangladesh Premier League. They represent Sylhet Division. The team plays their home matches at the Sylhet International Cricket Stadium. The current team known as Sylhet Titans established under its present name in 2025.

== History ==
Since the inception of the Bangladesh Premier League (BPL) in 2012, a Sylhet-based franchise has competed in every edition. Initially owned by Sylhet Sports Limited under the leadership of former Bangladesh Finance Minister Abul Maal Abdul Muhith, the team's ownership later passed to his son, Shahed Muhith, who became the chairman. For the sixth edition of the BPL, the franchise appointed former Pakistani cricketer Waqar Younis as head coach, with international cricketer David Warner named as captain. However, Warner was forced to step down due to injury, and former Bangladesh national team all-rounder Alok Kapali took over as captain.

In November 2019, the team was rebranded as Sylhet Thunder after 24Bazar.biz became its sponsor. The team underwent another change in ownership prior to the 2021–22 Bangladesh Premier League. Following the new ownership, the team was rebranded as Sylhet Sunrisers.

In September 2022, ownership was acquired by Future Sports Bangladesh, who renamed the team to Sylhet Strikers.

In November 2025, Cricket With Sami took ownership of the team renaming it to Sylhet Titans.

== Season overview ==
=== 2015 ===
In BPL 2015 (the 3rd edition of the Bangladesh Premier League), the Sylhet franchise competed as the Sylhet Super Stars after being re-formed from earlier Sylhet teams. They played in a six-team tournament held from late November to mid-December 2015, but the team struggled for consistency throughout the season and did not make it to the playoffs. Sylhet's squad featured several high-profile players such as Mushfiqur Rahim (as icon player), Shahid Afridi, Ravi Bopara, Rubel Hossain, Sohail Tanvir, Chris Jordan, Ajantha Mendis, and others, giving the side strong individual talent on paper. Despite this, they posted mixed results, including close losses against teams like Chittagong Vikings and occasional wins such as a notable victory over Barisal Bulls by nine wickets, but overall they finished low on the points table and outside of the top four qualifying positions.

=== 2017 ===
In 2017, the Sylhet franchise made its return to the Bangladesh Premier League (BPL) under the new Sylhet Sixers banner. The team's icon player was Sabbir Rahman, and it was captained by all-rounder Nasir Hossain. The Sixers signed wicketkeeper Nurul Hasan and orthodox spinner Taijul Islam as pre-draft acquisitions. Among their foreign signings were Krishmar Santokie, Babar Azam, Liam Plunkett, Andre Fletcher, Upul Tharanga, Ross Whitely, and others.

At the draft, the Sixers' first pick was pacer Abul Hasan, followed by Sri Lankan all-rounder Chaturanga de Silva as their first foreign pick. One of their surprise picks was Pakistani pacer Ghulam Mudassar, who had little experience in professional cricket and had an average of over 40 with the ball, taking just one wicket in the two matches he played.

The Sixers started their campaign strong with four consecutive victories on their home turf. Andre Fletcher and Upul Tharanga were dominant at the top of the batting order, while captain Nasir Hossain and Liam Plunkett provided key performances with the ball. However, a series of injuries throughout the tournament hindered their progress, and they ultimately finished fifth on the points table.

=== 2019 ===
In 2019, the Sixers retained key players like Sabbir Rahman, Nasir Hossain, and Pakistani all-rounder Sohail Tanvir. They also appointed Liton Das as their new icon player, a wicketkeeper and opening batsman for the Bangladesh National Cricket Team. Outside the draft, the team signed Australian batsman David Warner and English opening batsman Jason Roy. Additionally, they acquired Nepali leg-spinner Sandeep Lamichhane, South African spinner Imran Tahir, Wayne Parnell, and Pakistani all-rounder Mohammad Nawaz.

At the draft, the Sixers strengthened their squad with domestic players like Taskin Ahmed, Al-Amin Hossain, Afif Hossain, and Alok Kapali. They also added international players such as Nicholas Pooran, Mohammad Irfan, Andre Fletcher, and Gulbadin Naib.

=== 2019–20 ===
In September 2019, a conflict of interest arose between the Bangladesh Cricket Board (BCB) and the BPL franchises regarding the player signing process. As a result, the BCB took over the management of the BPL for the 2019–20 season. The tournament was renamed the Bangabandhu BPL T20 2019 in honor of Sheikh Mujibur Rahman on the occasion of his birth centenary. With BCB now managing the tournament, the Sixers were owned and operated by the board itself.

=== 2022 ===
In BPL 2022, the Sylhet franchise (known as Sylhet Sunrisers) had a poor season and finished near the bottom of the points table. They struggled to win matches consistently, ending the league with only about one victory and multiple losses, which left them with a low net run rate and few points compared to most other teams. The team's performance was underwhelming overall, with limited success in both batting and bowling, and they failed to challenge for playoff qualification in that edition of the Bangladesh Premier League.

=== 2023 ===
Sylhet Strikers had an impressive campaign in the Bangladesh Premier League (BPL) 2023, finishing the tournament as runners-up. They showed strong and consistent performances throughout the season, starting well in the league stage and maintaining momentum to qualify for the playoffs. The team was led by an outstanding performance from Najmul Hossain Shanto, who became the tournament's highest run-scorer with 516 runs and was named Player of the Tournament. Sylhet displayed a balanced squad effort with key contributions from both local and overseas players, helping them reach the final. However, in the championship match, they were defeated by Comilla Victorians, missing out on the title. Overall, BPL 2023 was Sylhet Strikers’ best season to date, marked by consistency, strong batting performances, and a historic runners-up finish.

=== 2024 ===
The Sylhet Strikers kicked off their 2024 campaign with a match against Chattogram Challengers on 19 January but were defeated by 7 wickets in their opening game. Throughout BPL 24, the Strikers played 10 matches, winning 3 and losing 7.

Overseas players included Kennar Lewis, Samit Patel, Harry Tector, Benny Howell, and Ryan Burl.

=== 2025 ===
The 2025 season proved to be underwhelming for the Sylhet franchise. They made an early exit from the tournament, finishing at the bottom of the table. The Strikers were able to recruit local talents like Jaker Ali, Rony Talukder, and Zakir Hasan, and retained Tanzim Hasan Sakib before the draft. Ariful Haque was appointed the team's captain.

Notable foreign signings included Rahkeem Cornwall, George Munsey, Paul Stirling, Reece Topley, and Aaron Jones.

=== 2026 ===
In BPL 2026, the Sylhet franchise is playing under a new identity as the Sylhet Titans rather than “Sylhet Strikers,” reflecting changes made ahead of the season. They are competing in the 12th edition of the Bangladesh Premier League, which runs from December 26, 2025, to January 23, 2026, with six teams participating. The Titans’ squad combines local stars like Mehidy Hasan Miraz with notable international players such as Moeen Ali, Mohammad Amir, and Azmatullah Omarzai, creating a balanced and competitive lineup. Their campaign has seen a mix of results in the league stage, including wins over teams like Dhaka Capitals and losses in other fixtures, positioning them in contention for a playoff spot. Overall, Sylhet Titans have shown competitive performances with this revamped squad, aiming to progress deep into the BPL 2026 playoffs.

== Squad ==
The squad of Sylhet Titans for 2025-26 season is:

Name	Nationality	Batting style	Bowling style	Notes
Batters
Hazratullah Zazai	Afghanistan	Left-handed		
Mominul Haque	Bangladesh	Left-handed	Slow left-arm orthodox	—N/a
Rony Talukdar	Bangladesh	Right-handed	—N/a	
Wicket-keepers
Parvez Hossain Emon	Bangladesh	Left-handed	—N/a	
Zakir Hasan	Bangladesh	Left-handed	—N/a	
Tawfique Khan Tushar	Bangladesh	Right-handed	—N/a	
Sam Billings	England	Right-handed	—N/a	
All-rounders
Mehidy Hasan Miraz	Bangladesh	Right-handed	Right-arm off-break	Captain
Ariful Islam	Bangladesh	Left-handed	Slow left-arm orthodox	—N/a
Saim Ayub	Pakistan	Left-handed	Right-arm off-break	Overseas
Azmatullah Omarzai	Afghanistan	Right-handed	Right-arm medium fast	Overseas
Moeen Ali	England	Left-handed	Right-arm off-break	Overseas
Ethan Brookes	England	Right-handed	Right-arm fast medium	Overseas
Chris Woakes	England	Right-handed	Right-arm Fast bowling	Overseas
Afif Hossain	Bangladesh	Left-handed	Right-arm off-break	—N/a
Rahatul Ferdous	Bangladesh	Left-handed	Slow left-arm orthodox	—N/a
Pace bowlers
Mohammad Amir	Pakistan	Left-handed	Left-arm fast medium	Overseas
Salman Irshad	Pakistan	Right-handed	Right-arm fast medium	
Khaled Ahmed	Bangladesh	Right-handed	Right-arm medium fast	—N/a
Shohidul Islam	Bangladesh	Right-handed	Right-arm medium fast	—N/a
Ebadot Hossain	Bangladesh	Right-handed	Right-arm medium fast	—N/a
Ruyel Miah	Bangladesh	Left-handed	Left-arm medium fast	—N/a
Spin bowlers
Nasum Ahmed	Bangladesh	Left-handed	Slow left-arm orthodox	—N/a

== Coaching staff ==
The coaching panel of Sylhet Titans for the season 2025-26 is:

Name	Role
Sohel Islam	Head coach
Mahbub Emon	Senior Assistant Coach
Rumi Rezwan	Team Manager
Nasir Ahmed	Performance Analyst
Imrul Kayes	Batting Coach
Syed Rasel	Pace-bowling Coach
Enamul Haque Jr	Spin-bowling Coach
Rumi Rezwan	Team Manager
Bayjedul Islam Khan	Physio

== Seasons ==
=== Bangladesh Premier League ===
Year	League standing	Final standing
2012	6th out of 6	League stage
2013	2nd out of 7	Playoffs
2015	5th out of 6	League stage
2016	Did not participate	
2017	5th out of 7	League stage
2018-19	6th out of 7	League stage
2019–20	7th out of 7	League stage
2022	6th out of 6	League stage
2023	1st out of 7	Runners-up
2024	6th out of 7	League stage
2025	7th out of 7	League stage
2026	4th out of 6	Playoffs
