= Sohel Islam =

Bangladeshi cricketer and coach

Personal information
- Full name: Mohammad Sohel Islam
- Born: 10 July 1970 (age 56); Satkhira, Khulna, Bangladesh
- Batting: Right-handed
- Bowling: Right-arm off-break
- Role: Bowler

Domestic team information
- Years: Team
- 2000/01–2001/02: Khulna Division

Career statistics
Competition	FC	LA
Matches	13	3
Runs scored	279	43
Batting average	15.50	14.33
100s/50s	0/1	0/0
Top score	51	32
Balls bowled	2,125	81
Wickets	40	2
Bowling average	23.27	25.00
5 wickets in innings	1	0
10 wickets in match	0	0
Best bowling	5/84	2/16
Catches/stumpings	3/–	–/–
- Source: Cricinfo, 26 February 2021

Sohel Islam (born 10 July 1970, Satkhira, Khulna, Bangladesh) is the current spin bowling coach of the Bangladesh National Cricket Team, having replaced Daniel Vettori in the role. Prior to obtaining the role as national spin bowling coach, he acted head coach of Fortune Barishal in the Bangabandhu T20 cup, as spin bowling coach for Bangladesh Under 19s during the 2016 Under 19 world cup, and coached Bangladesh Under 17s.

As a player he represented Khulna. He played in 13 first-class matches scoring 279 runs at an average of 15.50 with a highest score of 51 and getting 40 wickets at an average of 23.27 with best bowling figures in an innings of 5/84.
