= Mirza Tahir Baig =

Pakistani cricketer (born 1999)

Personal information
- Full name: Mirza Tahir Baig
- Born: 3 November 1999 (age 27); Sialkot, Punjab, Pakistan
- Height: 1.92 m (6 ft 4 in)
- Batting: Right-handed
- Role: Top order Batter

International information
- National side: Pakistan (2023)
- T20I debut (cap 105): 3 October 2023 v Hong Kong
- Last T20I: 7 October 2023 v Bangladesh

Domestic team information
- Years: Team
- 2023–2025: Lahore Qalandars
- 2023: Sialkot
- 2024: Sui Northern
- 2024: Pakistan Railways
- 2025/26: Chattogram Royals

Career statistics
Competition	T20I	LA	T20
Matches	3	3	35
Runs scored	36	144	913
Batting average	18.00	48.00	28.53
100s/50s	0/0	0/1	0/5
Top score	32*	95	80
Balls bowled	0	0	42
Wickets	0	0	1
Bowling average	–	–	61.00
5 wickets in innings	0	0	0
10 wickets in match	–	–	–
Best bowling	–	–	1/37
Catches/stumpings	1/–	1/–	6/–
- Source: Cricinfo, 26 December 2025

Mirza Tahir Baig (Urdu:مرزا طاہر بیگ) (born 3 November 1999) is a Pakistani cricketer who plays for Pakistan national team and played for Lahore Qalandars and Sui Northern in domestic cricket as a right-handed batsman.

== Domestic and franchise career ==
Baig promoted from the Lahore Qalandars High Performance Centre (Class of 2022).

He made his Twenty20 debut for Lahore Qalandars against Multan Sultans in the 2023 Pakistan Super League. He opened with Fakhar Zaman and scored 32 off 26 balls with five boundaries during his first appearance for Lahore. In the PSL 2023 Eliminator 2, Baig gave Lahore Qalandars a brisk start in their chase of 172 against Peshawar Zalmi, striking 54 off 42 balls with seven fours and two sixes. His partnership with Fakhar Zaman laid the foundation for Lahore's comfortable win, taking them to their third PSL final in four seasons. He was declared Player of the Match.

He made his List A debut for Sui Northern Gas Pipelines Limited against Oil & Gas Development Company Limited in the President's Cup Grade-I on 11 October 2024, and hit 95 off 75 deliveries.

In the 2025 National T20 Cup group stage, Baig starred for Sialkot Region with an unbeaten 76 off 44 balls, featuring seven fours and four sixes, as his team chased down a target of 138 in just 14.3 overs. His innings powered Sialkot to top Group D and secure a place in the quarter-finals alongside Multan Region.

== International career ==
Baig made his Twenty20 International (T20I) debut against Hong Kong in the Asian Games on 3 October 2023. In Pakistan's bronze-medal playoff against Bangladesh, Baig top-scored for his side with 32 runs off 18 balls in a rain-shortened five-over innings. Despite his efforts, Pakistan's total of 48 for 1 was chased down via the DLS method, as Bangladesh won by six wickets to claim the bronze medal.
