= Sajidul Islam =

Bangladeshi cricketer (born 1988)

Personal information
- Full name: Sajidul Islam
- Born: 18 January 1988 (age 38); Rangpur, Bangladesh
- Batting: Left-handed
- Bowling: Left-arm medium-fast
- Role: Allrounder

International information
- National side: Bangladesh
- Test debut (cap 49): 4 January 2008 v New Zealand
- Last Test: 25 April 2013 v Zimbabwe
- Only T20I (cap 37): 11 May 2013 v Zimbabwe

Domestic team information
- Years: Team
- 2005–2010: Barisal Division
- 2011–: Rangpur Division
- 2013–: Sylhet Royals

Umpiring information
- WT20Is umpired: 2 (2024)

Career statistics
Competition	Test	T20I	FC	LA
Matches	3	1	54	18
Runs scored	18	–	1,083	93
Batting average	3.00	–	19.33	9.30
100s/50s	0/0	–	0/4	0/0
Top score	6	–	76	40
Balls bowled	330	6	8,139	860
Wickets	3	0	152	24
Bowling average	77.33	–	27.69	28.50
5 wickets in innings	0	–	3	0
10 wickets in match	0	–	0	–
Best bowling	2/71	–	6/51	3/52
Catches/stumpings	0/–	1/–	15/–	6/–
- Source: CricketArchive, 13 May 2013

Sajidul Islam (Bengali: সাজিদুল ইসলাম; born 18 January 1988) is a Bangladeshi cricket umpire and former Bangladesh national cricket team player. He made his international cricket debut in 2008 against New Zealand. Sajid is a left-handed batsman and left arm medium fast bowler. He played for Bangladesh Under-17s in 2003/04 and represented the Bangladesh Cricket Board Academy in 2006/07. He made his debut for Barisal Division in 2005/06 and took an impressive 40 first-class wickets in his first two seasons in the game, with a best analysis of 5 for 61 against Dhaka Division.

== Career ==
In December 2007, he was called up to the Bangladesh squad on tour in New Zealand as a replacement for the injured Syed Rasel. On 4 January 2008 he made his Test debut, he took 2/71 which included taking a wicket with his second ball in Test cricket. In 2013, he made a successful return in the Test side when he played against Zimbabwe in Harare. In the 2012–13 season, Sajidul picked up 24 wickets for Rangpur Division which prompted his signing to the Sylhet Royals in the Bangladesh Premier League.
