= Ruyel Miah =

Bangladeshi cricketer (born 2000)

Personal information
- Full name: Md Ruyel Miah
- Born: 16 December 2000 (age 25); Moulvibazar, Bangladesh
- Batting: Left-handed
- Bowling: Left-arm medium-fast
- Role: Bowler
- Source: Cricinfo, 1 November 2018

Ruyel Miah (born 16 December 2000) is a Bangladeshi cricketer. He made his first-class debut for Sylhet Division in the 2018–19 National Cricket League on 29 October 2018. He made his Twenty20 debut for Gazi Group Cricketers in the 2018–19 Dhaka Premier Division Twenty20 Cricket League on 28 February 2019. He made his List A debut for Gazi Group Cricketers in the 2018–19 Dhaka Premier Division Cricket League on 9 March 2019.

In November 2019, he took eight wickets in the first innings of Sylhet Division's match against Chittagong Division in the 2019–20 National Cricket League. These were the best figures by a Bangladeshi pace bowler, with Ruyel taking a further five wickets in the second innings, for a match haul of 13 wickets for 65 runs.
