= Adam Rossington =

English cricketer (born 1993)

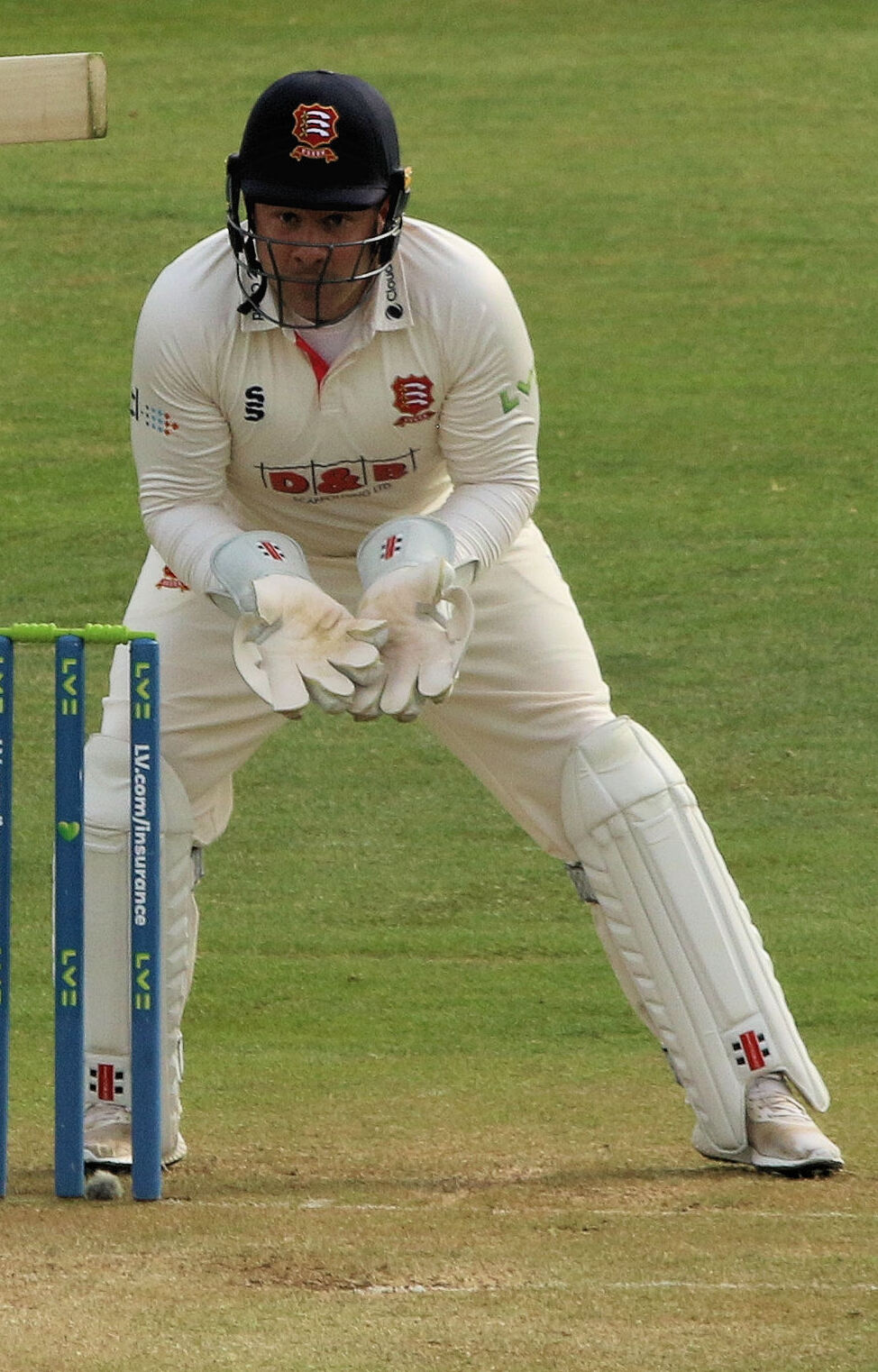
- Rossington in 2022, playing for Essex

Personal information
- Full name: Adam Matthew Rossington
- Born: 5 May 1993 (age 33); Edgware, Middlesex, England
- Nickname: Rossberg, Tank
- Height: 6 ft 0 in (1.83 m)
- Batting: Right handed
- Role: Wicket-keeper batsman

Domestic team information
- Years: Team
- 2010–2014: Middlesex
- 2014–2022: Northamptonshire
- 2022: → Essex (on loan)
- 2022–2025: Essex
- 2021–2024: London Spirit
- 2023: Sunrisers Eastern Cape
- 2023: Karachi Kings
- 2024: Lahore Qalandars
- 2025: Dubai Capitals
- 2025: Pokhara Avengers
- 2026: Chattogram Royals
- 2026: Middlesex
- First-class debut: 25 May 2010 Middlesex v Oxford MCCU
- List A debut: 13 June 2012 Middlesex v West Indians

Career statistics
Competition	FC	LA	T20
Matches	113	49	198
Runs scored	5,446	1,381	3,964
Batting average	33.20	37.32	21.78
100s/50s	9/34	0/11	0/22
Top score	138*	97	95
Catches/stumpings	245/20	34/5	90/38
- Source: , 15 July 2026

Adam Matthew Rossington (born 5 May 1993) is an English professional cricketer. Rossington is a right-handed batsman who fields as a wicket-keeper. He was born in Edgware, Middlesex, and was educated at Mill Hill School.

== County career ==
Rossington made his first-class cricket debut for Middlesex against Oxford MCCU at the University Parks in 2010. The following season he made his second first-class appearance against the touring Sri Lankans at Uxbridge. He also made his Twenty20 debut during the 2011 season against Kent in the Friends Provident t20. He made three further appearances in that season's competition, scoring a total of 27 runs at an average of 6.75, with a high score of 25. Rossington made his List A debut against the West Indian tourists in June 2012.

Rossington scored his maiden first-class century when he made 103 not out off 57 balls against Cambridge University on 24 April 2013. This innings included 7 sixes and one passage of 10 balls yielded 48 runs.

In 2014 Rossington played for Northamptonshire while on loan from Middlesex. At the end of that season he signed a contract with Northamptonshire. In August 2016 he was part of the Northants team that beat Durham to win the Twenty20 title.

In 2022, Rossington joined Essex on a season long loan. In April 2022, he was bought by the London Spirit for the 2022 season of The Hundred. In June 2022, Rossington signed a three-year contract with Essex.

In January 2023, Rossington was bought by Sunrisers Eastern Cape for the inaugural SA20 tournament.

He left Essex in October 2025. The following month, it was announced he would compete for Chattogram Royals in the 2026 Bangladesh Premier League.

In May 2026, Rossington rejoined Middlesex for the first six games of the 2026 T20 Blast.

== International career ==
Rossington made his debut for England Under-19s against Sri Lanka Under-19s during their tour to England in 2010, playing in two Youth Twenty20 Internationals. England Under-19s toured Sri Lanka in the early part of 2011, with Rossington playing a single Youth Test match on the tour, He scored 113, his hundred coming off 165 balls, with 12 fours and 2 sixes; he also made a stumping in the match.

Rossington has also made nine Youth One Day International appearances, including four against the touring South Africa Under-19s.
