= Tanzid Hasan =

Bangladeshi cricketer (born 2000)

Personal information
- Full name: Tanzid Hasan Tamim
- Born: 1 December 2000 (age 25); Bogra, Bangladesh
- Height: 5 ft 8 in (173 cm)
- Batting: Left-handed
- Role: Opening Batter

International information
- National side: Bangladesh (2023–present)
- Test debut (cap 109): 16 May 2026 v Pakistan
- Last Test: 13 August 2026 v Australia
- ODI debut (cap 143): 31 August 2023 v Sri Lanka
- Last ODI: 11 July 2026 v Zimbabwe
- ODI shirt no.: 31
- T20I debut (cap 90): 3 May 2024 v Zimbabwe
- Last T20I: 19 July 2026 v Zimbabwe
- T20I shirt no.: 31

Career statistics
Competition	Test	ODI	T20I	FC
Matches	2	40	53	27
Runs scored	131	1,044	1,331	1,923
Batting average	32.75	27.47	28.31	40.06
100s/50s	1/-	1/9	0/13	6/6
Top score	101	107	89	145
Balls bowled	0	–	–	6
Wickets	0	–	–	0
Bowling average	-	–	–	–
5 wickets in innings	0	–	–	-
10 wickets in match	0	–	–	-
Best bowling	–	–	–	–
Catches/stumpings	3/–	15/–	29/–	17/–
Medal record
Men's Cricket
Representing Bangladesh
ICC U-19 World Cup
Winner	2020 South Africa
- Source: Cricinfo, 21 August 2026

Tanzid Hasan Tamim (born 1 December 2000) is a Bangladeshi left-handed batter who has played for the national cricket team since 2023.

== Career ==
Hasan made his Twenty20 debut for Uttara Club in the 2018–19 Dhaka Premier Division T20 League on 26 February 2019. He made his List A debut for Uttara Sporting Club in the 2018–19 Dhaka Premier Division League on 8 March 2019. In December 2019, he was named in Bangladesh's squad for the 2020 Under-19 Cricket World Cup.

He made his first-class debut on 22 February 2020, for East Zone, in the final of the 2019–20 Bangladesh Cricket League. In February 2021, he was selected in the Bangladesh Emerging squad for their home series against the Ireland Wolves. In 2023, he was selected in Bangladesh's squad for the 50-over Cricket World Cup.

In May 2024, Hasan was named in Bangladesh's squad for the 2024 Men's T20 World Cup tournament.

On 14 August 2026, Hasan hit his maiden Test century during the 1st Test match against Australia. He is also the first and only Bangladeshi batter to have scored a Test century in Australia.
