= Parvez Hossain Emon =

Bangladeshi cricketer (born 2002)

Personal information
- Full name: Parvez Hossain Emon
- Born: 12 June 2002 (age 24); Chattogram, Bangladesh
- Height: 5 ft 9 in (175 cm)
- Batting: Left-handed
- Role: Opening-Batter

International information
- National side: Bangladesh (2022–present)
- ODI debut (cap 151): 2 July 2025 v Sri Lanka
- Last ODI: 8 July 2025 v Sri Lanka
- T20I debut (cap 76): 2 August 2022 v Zimbabwe
- Last T20I: 2 May 2026 v New Zealand

Career statistics
| Competition | ODI | T20I | FC | LA |
|---|---|---|---|---|
| Matches | 3 | 32 | 30 | 85 |
| Runs scored | 108 | 635 | 1,710 | 2,983 |
| Batting average | 36.00 | 21.16 | 32.88 | 38.24 |
| 100s/50s | 0/1 | 1/3 | 1/8 | 6/19 |
| Top score | 67 | 100 | 107 | 151 |
| Catches/stumpings | 1/– | 11/– | 18/2 | 29/– |
Medal record
Men's cricket
Representing Bangladesh
ICC U-19 World Cup
| Winner | 2020 South Africa |
Asian Games
| Bronze medal – third place | 2022 Hangzhou | Team |
- Source: Cricinfo, 4 June 2026

Parvez Hossain Emon (Bengali: পারভেজ হোসেন ইমন; born 12 June 2002) is a Bangladeshi left-handed batter who has played for the national team in limited overs cricket since 2022. He also represents Chittagong Division in domestic cricket. He was a member of the Bangladesh squad that won the 2020 Under-19 Cricket World Cup.

== Career ==
He made his Twenty20 debut for Bangladesh Krira Shikkha Protishtan in the 2018–19 Dhaka Premier Division Twenty20 Cricket League on 25 February 2019. He made his List A debut for Bangladesh Krira Shikkha Protishtan in the 2018–19 Dhaka Premier Division Cricket League on 8 March 2019. In December 2019, he was named in Bangladesh's squad for the 2020 Under-19 Cricket World Cup.

On 8 December 2020, in the 2020–21 Bangabandhu T20 Cup, Emon scored a century for Fortune Barishal, against Minister Group Rajshahi. His century came from 42 balls, the fastest by a Bangladeshi cricketer in a T20 cricket match. In January 2021, he was one of four uncapped players to be named in a preliminary squad for the One Day International (ODI) series against the West Indies. In February 2021, he was selected in the Bangladesh Emerging squad for their home series against the Ireland Wolves.

He made his first-class debut for Chittagong Division in the 2020–21 National Cricket League on 22 March 2021. In November 2021, he was named in Bangladesh's Twenty20 International (T20I) squad for their series against Pakistan In July 2022, he was again named in Bangladesh's T20I squad, this time for their tour of Zimbabwe. He made his T20I debut on 2 August 2022, for Bangladesh against Zimbabwe. He eventually got selected for the Bangladesh team for the 2025 ICC Champions Trophy on January 12, 2025.

In May 2025, he was named in Bangladesh's squad for their tour to UAE. On 17 May 2025, Emon scored 100 runs off just 54 balls in the 1st T20I, becoming just the second Bangladeshi men's cricketer to score a century in a T20I after Tamim Iqbal. He also set the record for most sixes in a T20I innings by a Bangladeshi cricketer, hitting nine, beating Rishad Hossain's seven against Sri Lanka.

He played for Lahore Qalandars in the 2026 Pakistan Super League.
