= Gazi Sohel =

Bangladeshi cricket umpire (born 1979)

Personal information
- Full name: Gazi Ashraful Afsar Sohel
- Born: 13 August 1979 (age 47); Munshigonj, Bangladesh
- Role: Umpire

Umpiring information
- ODIs umpired: 14 (2021–2026)
- T20Is umpired: 43 (2018–2026)
- WODIs umpired: 5 (2012–2024)
- WT20Is umpired: 7 (2012–2024)
- Source: Cricinfo, 12 May 2024

Gazi Sohel (Bengali: গাজী সোহেল, born 13 August 1979), also known as Gazi Ashraful Afsar Sohel, is a Bangladeshi cricket umpire.

== Umpiring career ==
Sohel has stood as an umpire in matches in the Bangladesh Premier League between 2012 and 2017. He was involved in a few on-field controversial decisions in Dhaka Premier League matches, including a match between Abahani Limited and Prime Doleshwar Sporting Club not being completed after both umpires walked off after facing abuse by Abahani players and supporters protesting a stumping decision.

In November 2018, he was selected in the ICC International Panel of Umpires. In December 2018, he made his debut as an international umpire during the West Indies tour of Bangladesh. In January 2021 he umpired in his first One Day International (ODI) match, between Bangladesh and the West Indies cricket team. He was one of the umpires for the 2022 Asia Cup.

In July–August, 2023, he officiated matches as an on-field umpire in 2023 Lanka Premier League, becoming the second Bangladeshi umpire to officiate matches in a foreign Twenty20 franchise league.

In January 2024, He was named as one of the sixteen match officials for 2024 Under-19 Cricket World Cup.

== See also ==
- List of One Day International cricket umpires
- List of Twenty20 International cricket umpires
