= Sylhet International Cricket Stadium =

Cricket stadium

Sylhet Cricket Stadium
- Sylhet Cricket Ground
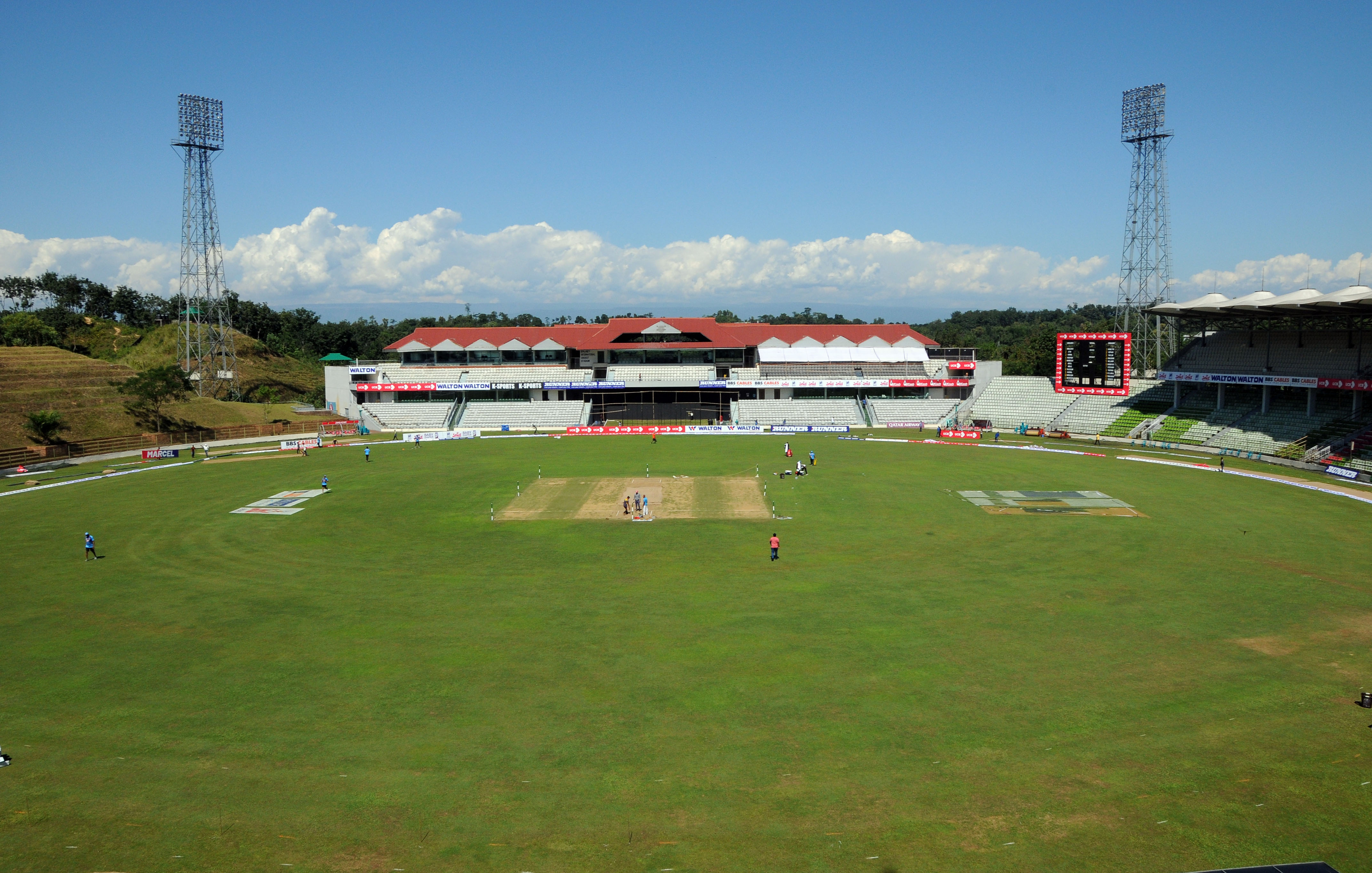
- A view of the Sylhet International Cricket Stadium
- Interactive map of Sylhet Cricket Stadium

Ground information
- Location: Sylhet, Bangladesh
- Country: Bangladesh
- Coordinates: 24°55′15″N 91°52′07″E
- Establishment: 2007
- Capacity: 18,500
- Architect: Masudur Rahman Khan
- Operator: National Sports Council
- Tenants: Bangladesh cricket team, Sylhet Titans
- End names
- UCB End; Runner End

International information
- First men's Test: 3–6 November 2018: Bangladesh v Zimbabwe
- Last men's Test: 16-20 May 2026: Bangladesh v Pakistan
- First men's ODI: 14 December 2018: Bangladesh v West Indies
- Last men's ODI: 23 March 2023: Bangladesh v Ireland
- First men's T20I: 17 March 2014: Ireland v Zimbabwe
- Last men's T20I: 3 September 2025: Bangladesh v Netherlands
- First women's T20I: 23 March 2014: Australia v New Zealand
- Last women's T20I: 02 May 2026: Bangladesh v Sri Lanka
- As of 29 July 2026; Source: ESPNcricinfo

Sylhet International Cricket Stadium (SICS) (Bengali: সিলেট আন্তর্জাতিক ক্রিকেট স্টেডিয়াম) also known as Sylhet Stadium and previously known as Sylhet Divisional Stadium, is a cricket stadium in Sylhet, Bangladesh. SICS is surrounded by hills and has a scenic view and it is the only cricket stadium having a green gallery. The stadium was significantly expanded in 2013, to host matches for the 2014 ICC World Twenty20 and 2014 ICC Women's World Twenty20. The stadium hosted its first international match on 17 March 2014 with Ireland taking on Zimbabwe. The stadium hosted 2022 Women's Twenty20 Asia Cup.

== History ==
The stadium was built in 2007, as a divisional cricket stadium. The stadium is surrounded by hills and has a scenic view. England Lions, England Under-19 and Nepal Under-19 have played here.

The venue hosted its first test match in November 2018, becoming the eighth test venue in Bangladesh, where the home team lost to Zimbabwe by 151 runs. The venue hosted its second test five years later, in 2023, since the first test match was played here in 2018.

In November–December 2023, Bangladesh played a test against New Zealand and won the match by 150 runs which was their first test win against New Zealand at home and their first test win at this venue.

=== Renovation and expansion ===
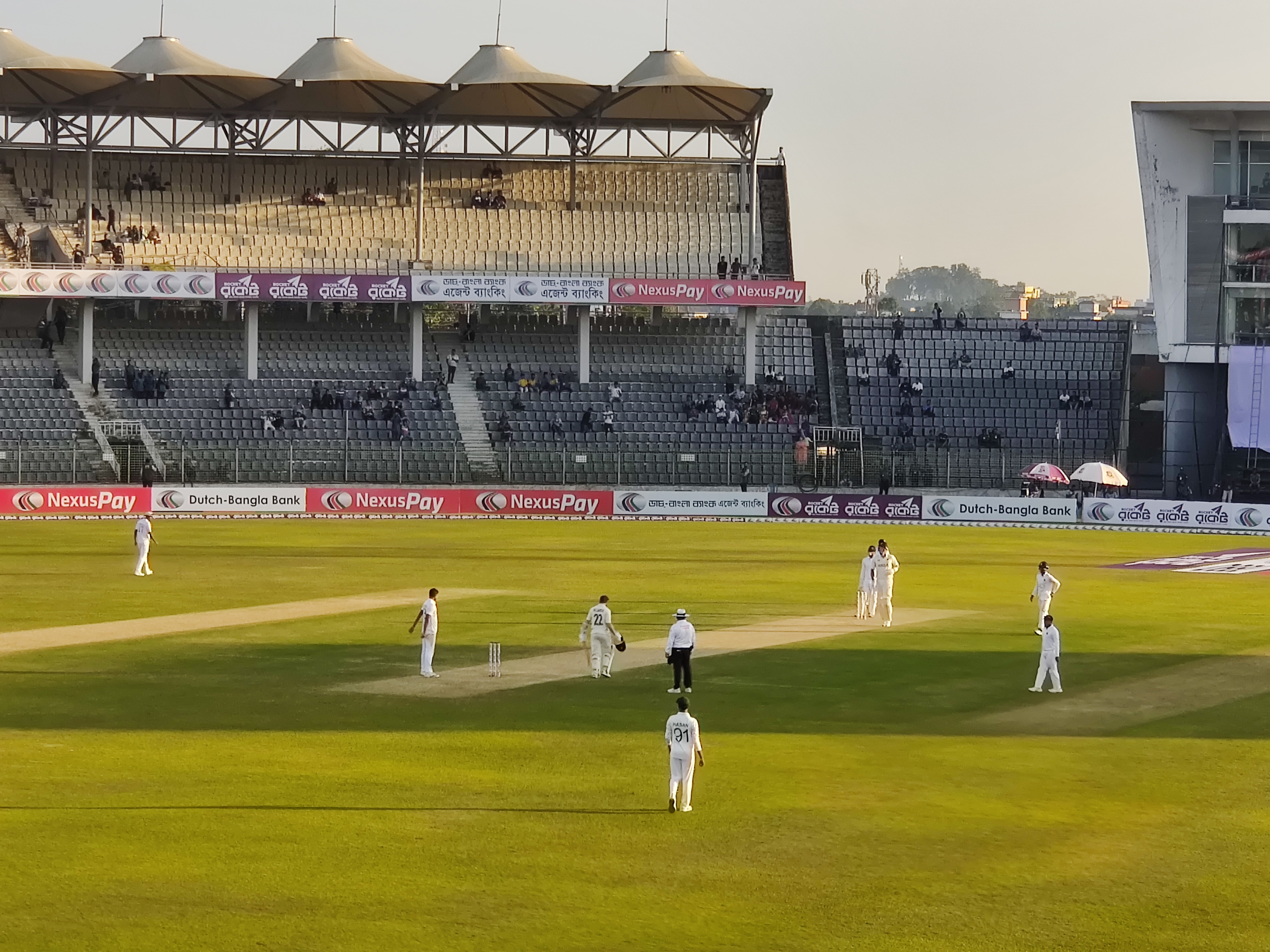
During the second day of the test between Bangladesh and New Zealand in 2023

The stadium was expanded and renovated to host matches of the 2014 ICC World Twenty20. The renovation began in June 2013 and ended in mid-November 2013. The main pavilion building and the media center have been constructed, floodlights have been installed, and seating arrangements were modified. Another more striking part of the stadium is the newly built, country's first 'Green gallery'.

The venue was again renovated in 2017 in order to upgrade the venue to an international standard stadium. A second tier was built in the east side gallery, increasing the seating capacity by 5,000 and the green hillock was remodified. As a result, the venue hosted the first leg of BPL 2017 matches.

==== Statistics ====
Ground Figures
Format	P	H	T	N	D/N/T	Inaugural Match	Latest Match	Refs
Test	3	1	2	0	0	3 November 2018	22 - 25 March 2024	
ODIs	7	6	0	0	1	14 December 2018	23 March 2023	
T20Is	10	2	2	6	0	17 March 2014	4 March 2024	
Last updated: Bangladesh v Sri Lanka, 4 March 2024

Records

- In a 2014 ICC World Twenty20 qualifying match between Ireland and Netherlands, both teams were fighting for a spot in the Super 10. Ireland batted first & scored 189–4. Netherlands needed to win the match within 13.5 overs to qualify for Super 10's. If they do so, they would qualify for Super 10's. If they only win the match without winning it in 13.5 overs, then Zimbabwe will qualify for the Super 10's. But if their current opponents win, then Ireland would be qualified. This match holds a few records.
  - 1- Netherlands scored the fastest 100 in just 6.6 overs, the fastest for any team in T20I.
  - 2- Netherlands scored the fastest 150 in just 10.3 overs, the fastest for any team in T20I.
  - 3- Netherlands won the match with 37 balls to spare, the fastest win for any team in T20I chasing 180 runs.
- Taijul Islam became only 4th Bangladeshi bowler to take a 10 wicket-haul in Test cricket. He also holds the record of third best bowling figure (11/170) in a test match by any Bangladeshi bowler.
- In March 2020, when Zimbabwe toured Bangladesh, in the three-match ODI series, few records were created:
  - In the first ODI:
    - Bangladesh won the match by 169 runs, their biggest winning margin in ODIs.
    - Mashrafe Mortaza took his 100th wicket as captain in ODIs and his 700th wicket of his career.
  - In the Second ODI, Tamim Iqbal became the first batsman for Bangladesh to score 7,000 runs in ODIs.
  - In the third ODI:
  - Tamim Iqbal and Liton Das made a partnership of 292 runs which is the highest partnership for any wicket for Bangladesh.
    - Liton Das scored 176 runs off 143 balls, the highest individual score by any Bangladeshi batsman in ODIs.
    - Liton Das hit 8 sixes, and a total of 24 boundaries (16 fours and 8 sixes), the most by any Bangladeshi batsman in an ODI match.

== International centuries ==
Shai Hope scored the first century at this ground in its inaugural ODI match when West Indies toured Bangladesh in 2018-19. Liton Das became first Bangladeshi batsman to score a century at the venue when Zimbabwe toured Bangladesh in March 2020.

=== Test centuries ===
List of Test Centuries
No.	Score	Player	Team	Balls	Inns.	Opposing team	Date	Result
1	104	Kane Williamson	New Zealand	205	2	Bangladesh	28 November 2023	Lost
2	105	Najmul Hossain Shanto (1/2)	Bangladesh	198	3	New Zealand	28 November 2023	Won
3	102	Dhananjaya de Silva (1/2)	Sri Lanka	131	1	Bangladesh	22 March 2024	Won
4	102	Kamindu Mendis (1/2)	Sri Lanka	127	1	Bangladesh	22 March 2024	Won
5	108	Dhananjaya de Silva (2/2)	Sri Lanka	179	3	Bangladesh	22 March 2024	Won
6	164	Kamindu Mendis (2/2)	Sri Lanka	237	3	Bangladesh	22 March 2024	Won
7	171	Mahmudul Hasan Joy	Bangladesh	286	2	Ireland	11 November 2025	Won
8	100	Najmul Hossain Shanto (2/2)	Bangladesh	114	2	Ireland	11 November 2025	Won
9	126	Litton Das	Bangladesh	159	1	Pakistan	11 November 2025	Won
10	137	Mushfiqur Rahim	Bangladesh	233	3	Pakistan	11 November 2025	Won

=== ODI centuries ===
List of ODI Centuries
No.	Score	Player	Team	Balls	Inns.	Opposing team	Date	Result
1	108*	Shai Hope	West Indies	131	1	Bangladesh	14 December 2018	Lost
2	126(rno)†	Liton Das	Bangladesh	105	1	Zimbabwe	1 March 2020	Won
3	158†	Tamim Iqbal	Bangladesh	136	1	Zimbabwe	3 March 2020	Won
4	176†	Liton Das	Bangladesh	143	1	Zimbabwe	6 March 2020	Won
5	128	Tamim Iqbal	Bangladesh	109	1	Zimbabwe	6 March 2020	Won
6	100†	Mushfiqur Rahim	Bangladesh	60	1	Ireland	20 March 2023	No result

=== Women's Twenty20 International centuries ===
The following table summarises the Women's Twenty20 International centuries scored at Sylhet International Cricket Stadium.

No.	Score	Player	Team	Balls	Inns.	Opponent	Date	Result
1	126	Meg Lanning	Australia	65	1	Ireland	27 March 2014	Won

=== Under-19 ODI centuries ===
The following table summarises the Under-19 ODI centuries scored at Sylhet International Cricket Stadium.

No.	Score	Player	Team	Balls	Inns.	Opponent	Date	Result
1	109	Najmul Hossain Shanto	Bangladesh	131	1	Sri Lanka	23 April 2013	Won

== Gallery ==
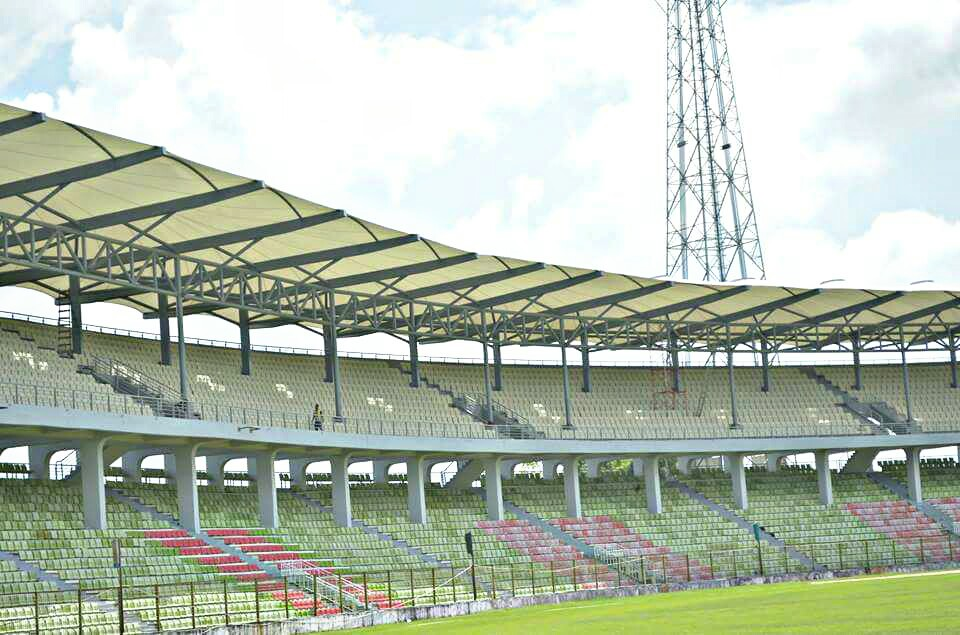
Newly built grandstand

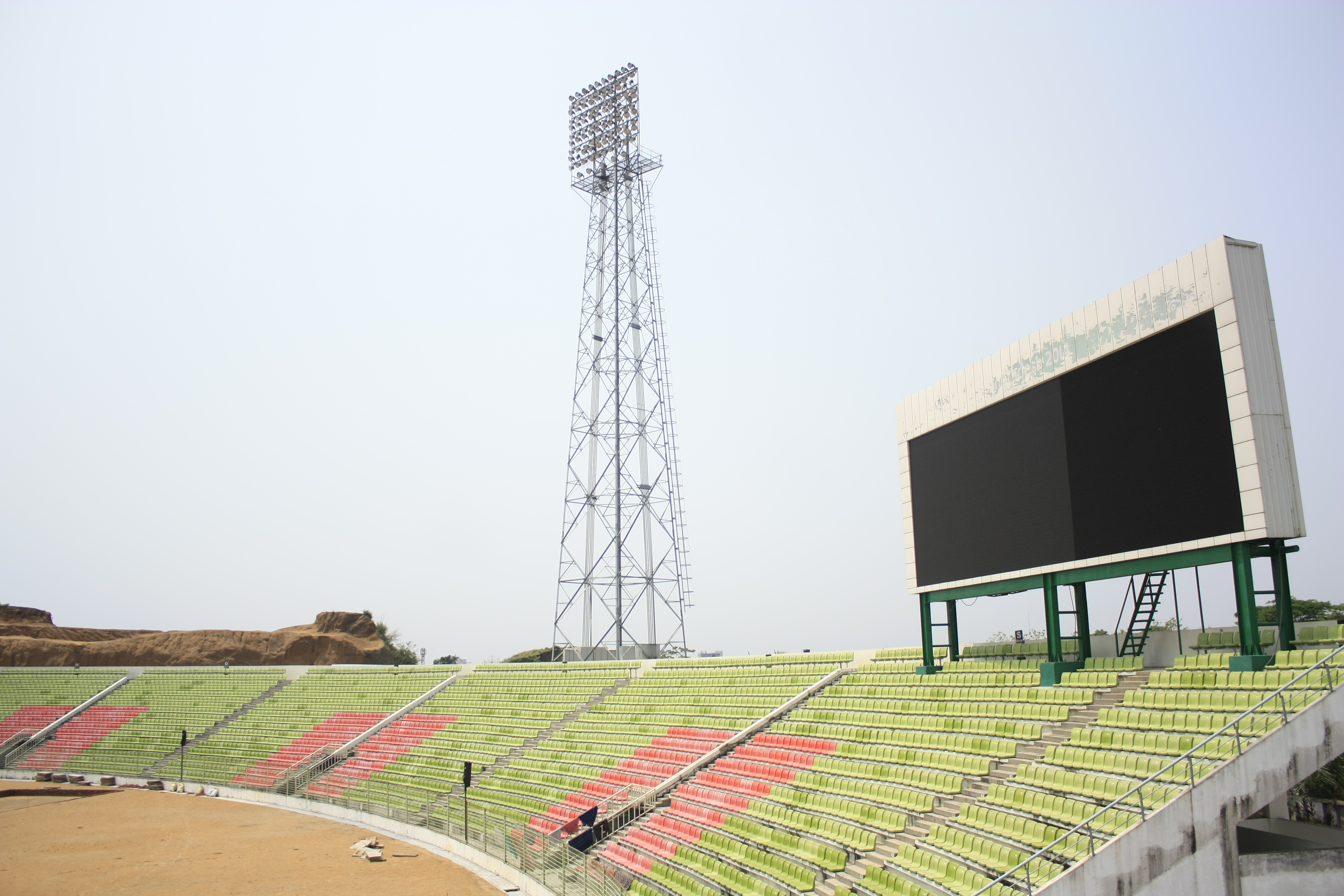
Giant screen

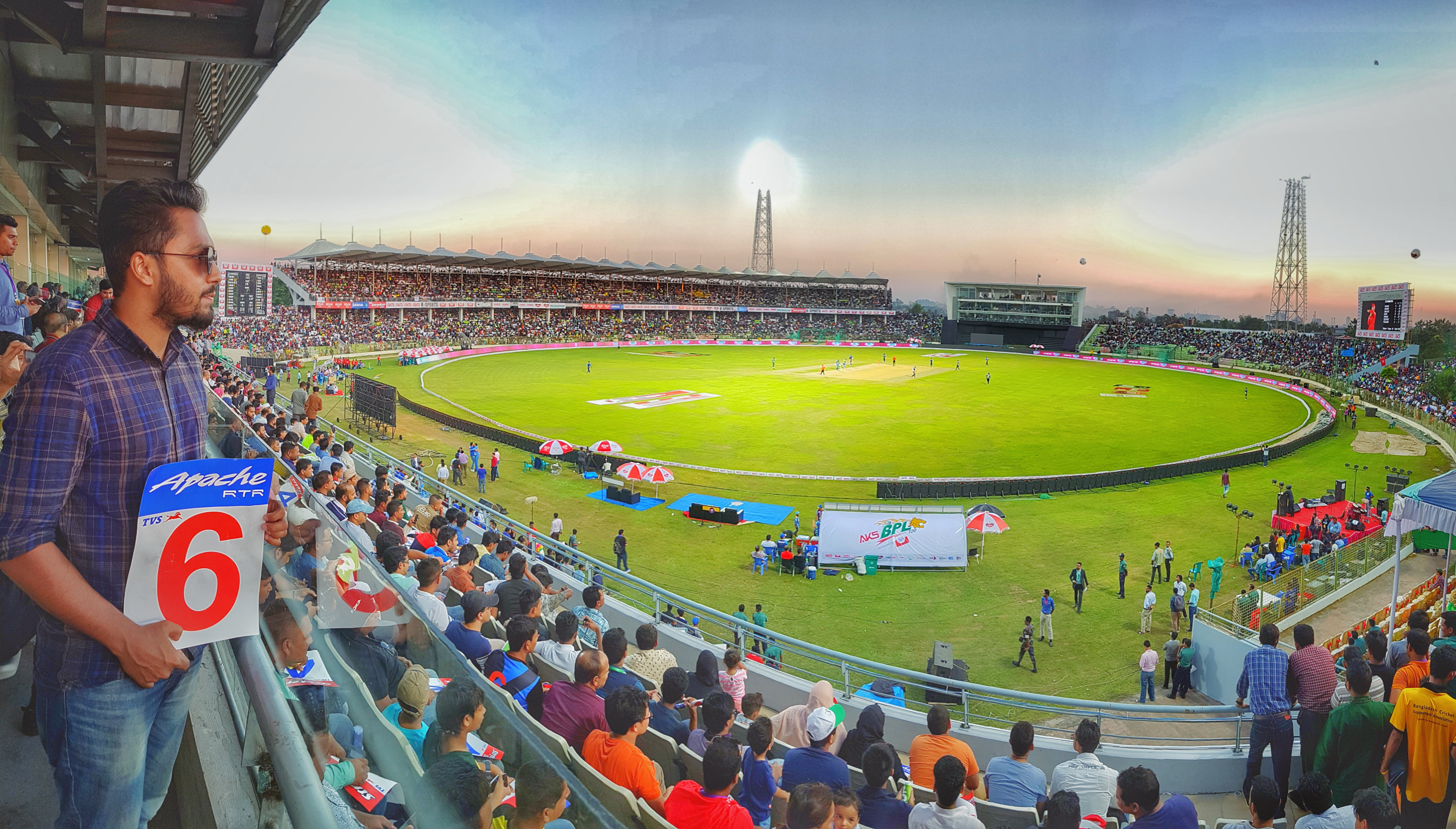
Crowded stadium during a BPL match

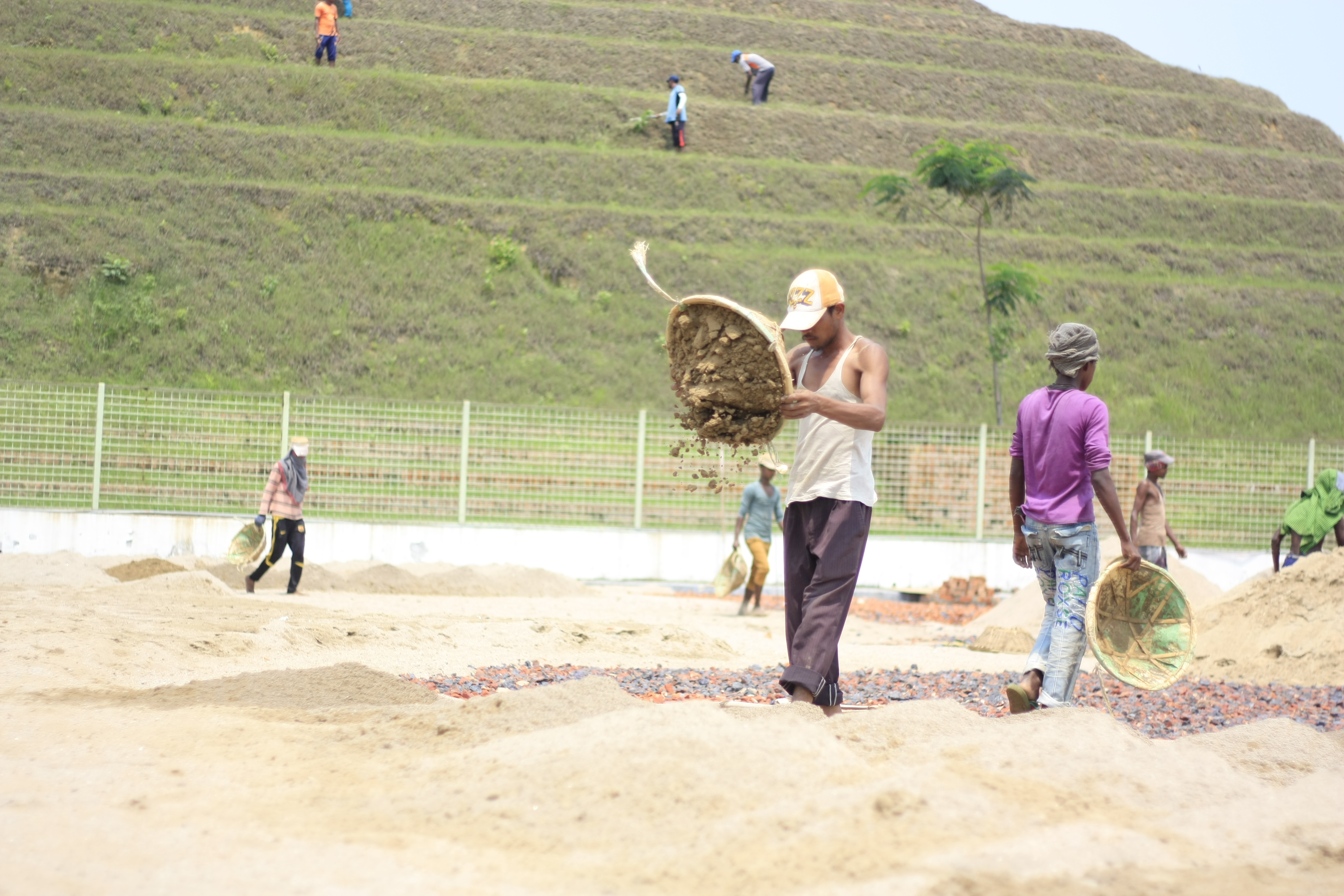
The green hillock at the ground

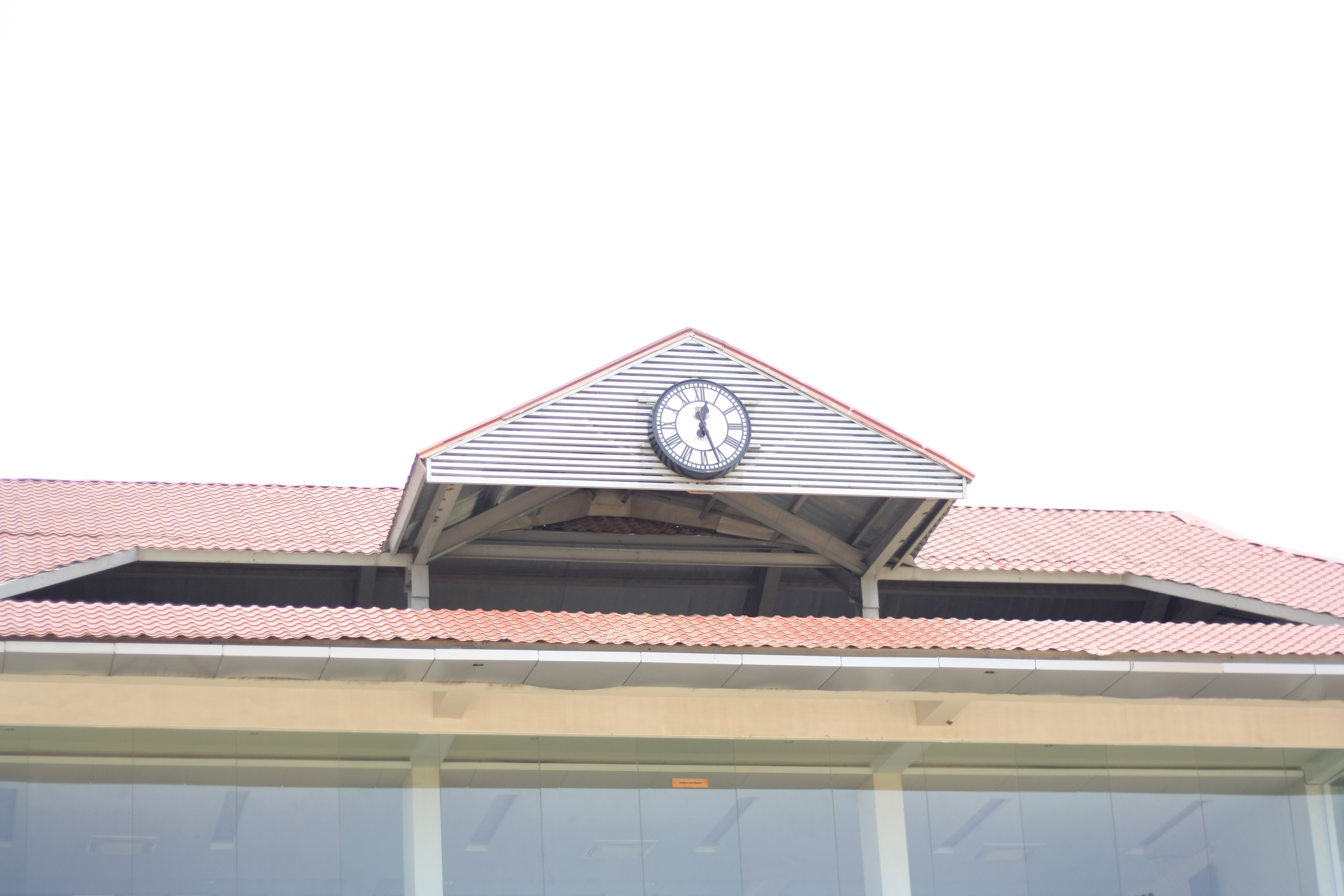
The roof of the main pavilion

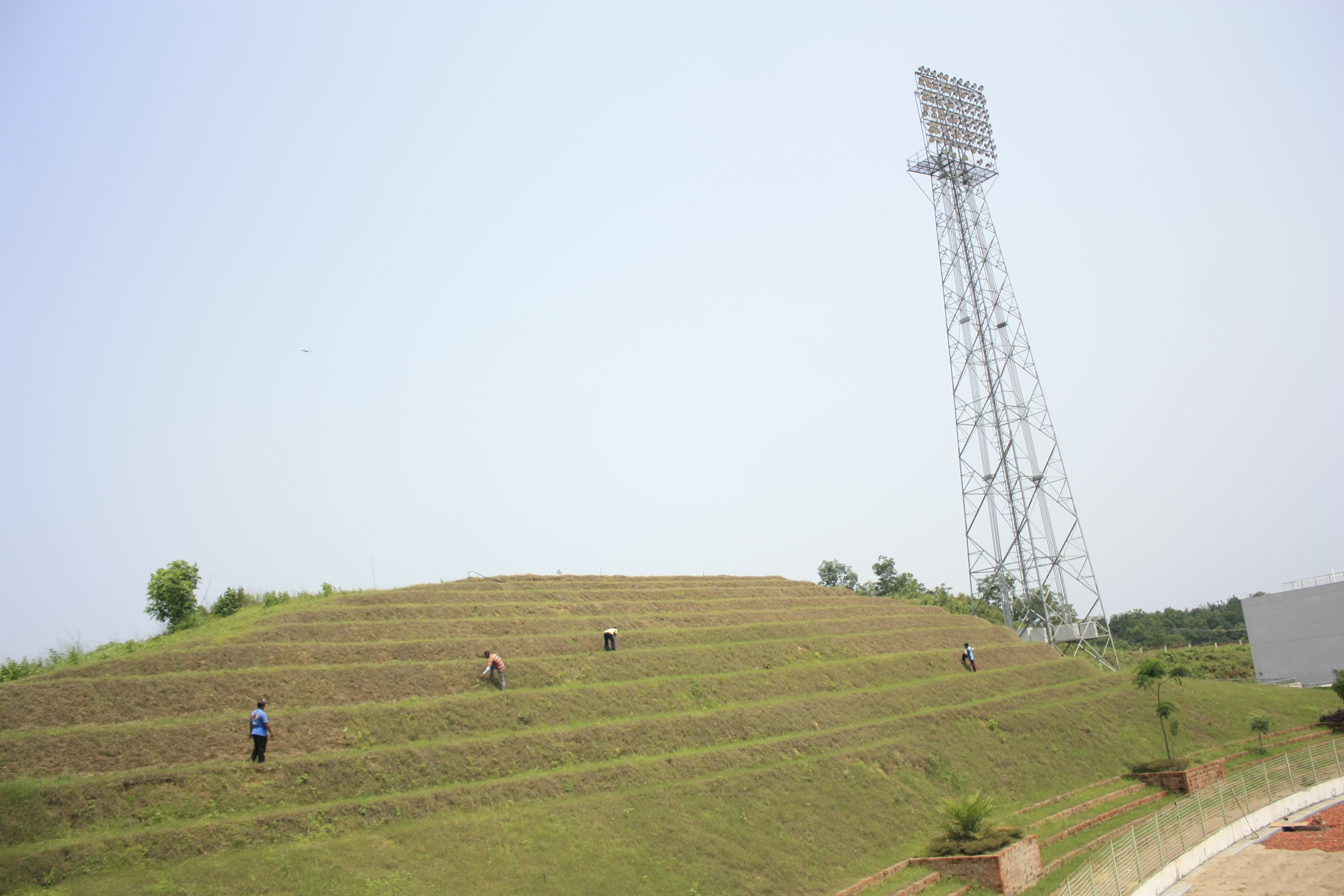
The green hillock at the ground

People cheering after Shakib Al Hasan hit a boundary during the first Bangladesh vs Ireland ODI

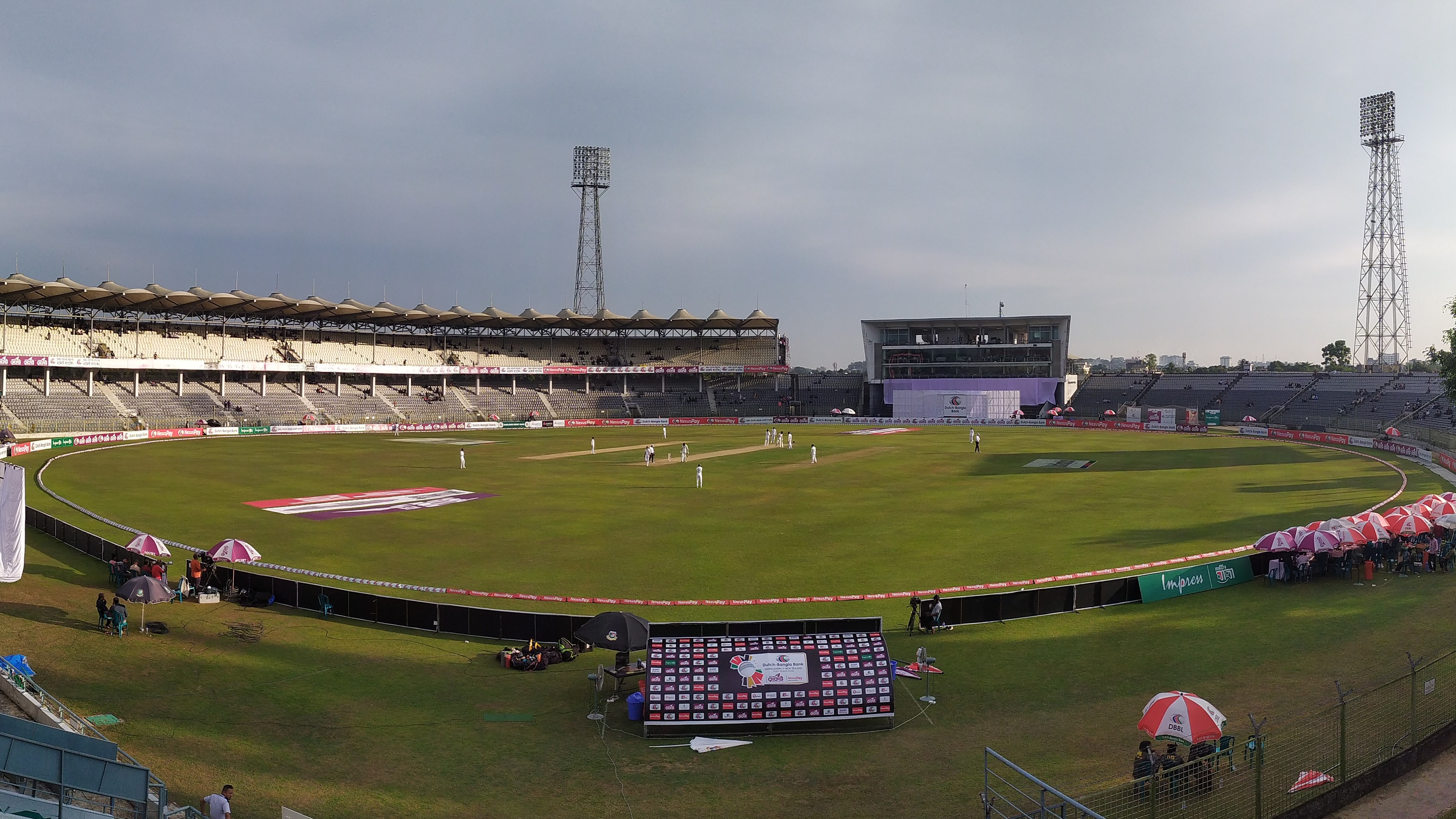
Panoramic view of the ground

== See also ==
- List of stadiums in Asia
- List of international cricket grounds in Bangladesh
- Stadiums in Bangladesh
