= Tanvir Ahmed (umpire) =

Bangladeshi cricket umpire (born 1972)

Personal information
- Born: 3 October 1972 (age 54); Dhaka, Bangladesh
- Role: Umpire

Umpiring information
- ODIs umpired: 10 (2021–2026)
- T20Is umpired: 32 (2018–2025)
- WODIs umpired: 5 (2012–2024)
- WT20Is umpired: 4 (2012–2023)
- Source: ESPNcricinfo, 28 November 2023

Tanvir Ahmed (Bengali: তানভীর আহমেদ; born 3 October 1972) is a Bangladeshi cricket umpire.

== Umpiring career ==
Tanvir Ahmed officiated in his first List A match in Bangladesh in 2005–06, and his first first-class match in 2007–08. He has been an on-field umpire in the Bangladesh Premier League since 2012.

Ahmed has been involved in a few controversial umpiring decisions and has often been in arguments with players. In the 2015 Bangladesh Premier League, in a group match Shakib Al Hasan fumed at him for his controversial decisions.

In November 2018, he was selected in the ICC International Panel of Umpires. He stood in his first men's match as an international umpire on 17 December 2018 in the 1st T20I match between Bangladesh and West Indies.

On 22 December 2018 Ahmed was again involved in a controversial "no ball" decision in the 3rd T20I between Bangladesh and West Indies when he called a no ball resulting in a protest from the West Indies captain Carlos Brathwaite and the team management. The match referee had to intervene to resolve the matter; the match resumed after a 10-minute pause.

In January 2021, he umpired in his first men's One Day International (ODI) match, between Bangladesh and the West Indies.

== See also ==
- List of One Day International cricket umpires
- List of Twenty20 International cricket umpires
