= Ruchira Palliyaguruge =

Sri Lankan cricket player and umpire

Personal information
- Full name: Ruchira Shaman Akmeemana Palliyaguruge
- Born: 22 January 1968 (age 58); Matara, Sri Lanka
- Batting: Right-handed
- Bowling: Right-arm medium
- Role: Umpire

Umpiring information
- Tests umpired: 9 (2018–2021)
- ODIs umpired: 100 (2011–2025)
- T20Is umpired: 56 (2011–2025)
- WODIs umpired: 14 (2013–2022)
- WT20Is umpired: 5 (2016–2023)

Career statistics
Competition	FC	LA	T20
Matches	124	63	9
Runs scored	4,478	928	153
Batting average	27.81	18.56	25.50
100s/50s	7/23	0/4	0/1
Top score	147	72	65
Balls bowled	10,324	1,956	145
Wickets	220	59	6
Bowling average	23,64	24.28	40.00
5 wickets in innings	4	0	0
10 wickets in match	0	–	–
Best bowling	6/26	4/37	2/45
Catches/stumpings	86/–	30/–	4/–
- Source: Cricinfo, 6 July 2025

Ruchira Palliyaguruge (born 22 January 1968) is a Sri Lankan umpire and former first-class cricketer. He played for Bloomfield Cricket and Athletic Club, Chilaw Marians Cricket Club, Saracens Sports Club, Nondescripts Cricket Club, and Old Cambrians Sports Club. Palliyaguruge bowled right-arm medium pace and batted right-handed. Playing mostly club cricket, he has over 200 first-class wickets to his name and also over 4000 runs in a career that lasted from 1989/90 to 2007.

Palliyaguruge's One Day International (ODI) umpiring debut was in a match between Sri Lanka and Australia at Hambantota in 2011. Ruchira's umpiring career has been marked with controversy. According to an article in The Sunday Times: Senior cricket umpires have petitioned Sri Lanka Cricket that umpires such as Ruchira Palliyaguruge named for the ICC Panel have not been done according to merit. He made his Twenty20 debut on 17 August 2004, for Panadura Sports Club in the 2004 SLC Twenty20 Tournament.

He was selected as one of the twenty umpires to stand in matches during the 2015 Cricket World Cup. He stood in the final of the 2016 Asia Cup. In November 2016 he won Sri Lanka Cricket's award for International Umpire of the Year. In 2018, in the 2nd Test between Bangladesh and West Indies in Dhaka Palliyaguruge officiated in his first Test match.

In April 2019, he was named as one of the sixteen umpires to stand in matches during the 2019 Cricket World Cup. In February 2022, he was named as one of the on-field umpires for the 2022 Women's Cricket World Cup in New Zealand.

== See also ==
- List of Test cricket umpires
- List of One Day International cricket umpires
- List of Twenty20 International cricket umpires
