= Sports Hub =

Sports Hub may refer to:

== Venue ==
- Fico Sports Hub, a defunct futsal venue in Singapore
- Greenfield International Stadium in Kerala, India, commonly known as The Sports Hub
- The Kallang, formerly known as Singapore Sports Hub

== Others ==
- Sports Hub Bangladesh, Bangladeshi sports organisation
- WBZ-FM, known as "98.5 The Sports Hub"
