= Imago Sports Management =

Bangladeshi talent and sports based agency

- Company type: Private Limited Company
- Founders: Tamzidul Islam, Ahmed Raqib, Quazi Sabir and Rejwan Zaman
- Headquarters: Dhaka, Bangladesh
- Key people: Quazi Sabir; Tamzidul Islam; Ahmed Raqib; Rejwan Zaman
- Website: imagosports.com.bd

Imago Sports Management is a Bangladeshi talent and sports-based agency. It was founded by Tamzidul Islam, Quazi Sabir, Ahmed Raqib, and Rejwan Uz Zaman.

== Consulting and management ==
Imago Sports Management is the overseas players management partner for Bangladesh Premier League. Since 2015, Imago Sports Management has been conducting the players draft event also is the official players management partner of Bangladesh Cricket Board for Bangladesh Premier League. Consulting works with many corporations on marketing and sponsorship programs, Imago Sports Management works with leagues and franchises throughout Bangladesh.

== Athletes ==
Notable athletes represented by Imago Sports, both past and present, are:

- Mahmudullah Riyad, cricketer, Bangladesh National Team
- Mosaddek Hossain (cricketer, born 1995), Bangladesh National Team
- Shahriar Nafees, cricketer, Bangladesh National Team
- Mashrafe Mortaza, cricketer, Bangladesh National Team (captain)
- Rohan Ricketts, English footballer
- Mamunul Islam, footballer, Bangladesh National Team (captain)
- Siddikur Rahman, Bangladeshi professional golfer
- Syque Caesar, American-born Bangladeshi gymnast
- Mohammad Mohasin, Bangladeshi wheelchair cricketer

== Masters' Cricket Carnival ==
Masters’ Cricket Carnival-Bangladesh (MCC-Bangladesh) is an initiative of former national cricketers of Bangladesh. Every year, the tournament will take place in different cities of Bangladesh contested by former national & first-class cricketers of Bangladesh. The 2016 edition of the tournament took place in Cox's Bazar and Dhaka. Imago Sports Management Ltd was the sole management partner of the tournament.

== Wheelchair cricket launched in Bangladesh ==
First ever wheelchair cricket tournament in Bangladesh launched in 2016 by Imago Sports Management in association with Wheelchair Cricketers Welfare Association- Bangladesh. Thirty-Six (36) Wheelchair Cricketers (Twenty-Five (25) from outside of Dhaka) participated in this daylong tournament. For most of the wheelchair users this was the very first time they participated in a competitive sports match.

== Dhaka Women's Marathon ==
Everest Academy and Imago Sports Management organizes Dhaka Women's Marathon, the only all women's marathon. The marathon is organised to celebrate International Women's Dhaka and for a safer Dhaka for women. More than 500 participants run in the 10K marathon in Hatirjheel, Dhaka. 110 participants finished the race within 90 minutes mark. Mirona Khatun of Bangladesh Navy became the winner of 2017 edition, finishing the race with a timing of 52m 18s.

== Sports Hub Bangladesh ==
Sports Hub Bangladesh is an annual conference of sports governing body personnel, sports professionals, organizers, sports personalities and sports enthusiasts. The goal of the initiative is to bring together all the stakeholders of the Bangladesh sports industry and give them a platform to network. Young students, sports enthusiasts will have the opportunity to register as participants and learn about the nuances of the sports industry from the experts. On September 23, 2017, Imago Sports organized the first sports business conference of Bangladesh. Sports Industry stalwarts and marketing experts shared their take on current trends in Sports Marketing, Club & Franchise Management, Sports Journalism and Bangladesh Football. Followed by the sessions, a Sports Business Idea Competition for university students was organized. More than 400 participants were present during the event.
