= Ripon Mondol =

Bangladeshi cricketer (born 2003)

Personal information
- Full name: Mohammad Ripon Mondol
- Born: 21 March 2003 (age 23); Gazipur, Bangladesh
- Height: 1.82 m (6 ft 0 in)
- Batting: Right-handed
- Bowling: Right-arm medium
- Role: Bowler

International information
- National side: Bangladesh (2023–present)
- T20I debut (cap 83): 4 October 2023 v Malaysia
- Last T20I: 2 May 2026 v New Zealand

Domestic team information
- Years: Team
- 2022: Shinepukur
- 2022–present: Dhaka Division
- 2022/23–2023/24: Rangpur Riders
- 2024/25: Fortune Barishal
- 2025/26: Rajshahi Warriors
- 2026: Colombo Kaps

Career statistics
Competition	T20I	FC	LA	T20
Matches	5	19	51	39
Runs scored	0	225	159	64
Batting average	0	11.84	19.87	5.81
100s/50s	0/0	0/0	0/0	0/0
Top score	0	43*	28*	11*
Balls bowled	78	2,398	2,156	802
Wickets	4	50	73	59
Bowling average	31.50	25.68	26.87	18.98
5 wickets in innings	0	0	0	0
10 wickets in match	0	0	0	0
Best bowling	3/14	4/50	4/38	4/13
Catches/stumpings	0/–	8/–	13/–	7/–
Medal record
Men's cricket
Representing Bangladesh
Asian Games
Bronze medal – third place	2022 Hangzhou
- Source: Cricinfo, 12 August 2026

Mohammad Ripon Mondol (born 21 March 2003) is a Bangladeshi cricketer who plays for the Bangladesh national team as a right-arm medium bowler. He represents Dhaka Division in domestic cricket and Rajshahi Warriors in the Bangladesh Premier League. Mondol was part of the Bangladeshi team that won the bronze medal at the 2022 Asian Games.

== Career ==
=== Youth ===
In December 2021, Mondol was named in Bangladesh's squad for the 2022 U19 World Cup. He took 14 wickets in that tournament, and was named in the ICC's Most Valuable Team of the Tournament.

=== Domestic ===
Mondol made his List A debut on 15 March 2022, for Shinepukur Cricket Club in the 2021–22 Dhaka Premier Division Cricket League. He was named as the player of the match in the match against Rupganj Tigers Cricket Club on 2 April 2022. He made his first-class debut on 10 October 2022, for Dhaka Division in the 2022–23 National Cricket League.

In November 2022, he was selected to play for Rangpur Riders following the players' draft in the 2022–23 Bangladesh Premier League. He made his Twenty20 debut on 8 February 2023, for Rangpur Riders in that tournament.

=== International ===
In September 2023, Mondol was selected to play for Bangladesh in the Asian Games. He made his Twenty20 International debut on 4 October 2023, against Malaysia.

== Personal life ==
Mondol was born on 21 March 2003 in Gazipur, in a Muslim family to father Babu Mondol and mother Asma Mondol.
