= Ashiqur Zaman =

Bangladeshi cricketer

Personal information
- Full name: Mohammad Ashiqur Zaman
- Born: 15 November 2002 (age 23); Satkhira
- Batting: Right-handed
- Bowling: Right-arm medium
- Role: Bowler

Domestic team information
- Years: Team
- 2022–present: Bangladesh A
- 2023: Comilla Victorians
- 2022–present: Khulna Division
- 2022–present: Gazi Group Cricketers
- Source: ESPNcricinfo, 6 January 2023

Mohammad Ashiqur Zaman (born 15 November 2002) is a Bangladeshi cricketer, who is a right-arm medium bowler. He plays for Khulna Division in domestic cricket and Bangladesh A cricket team in international cricket.

== Career ==
He made his List A debut on 15 March 2022, for the Gazi Group Cricketers in the 2021–22 Dhaka Premier Division Cricket League. He made his first-class debut for Khulna Division in the 2022–23 National Cricket League, on 17 October 2022.

In November 2022, he was picked by the Comilla Victorians following the players' draft to play for them in the 2022–23 Bangladesh Premier League. In December 2022, he earned his maiden call-up to the Bangladesh A squad for their first-class series against India A. He played his first international match for Bangladesh A, on 6 December 2022 in the 2nd unofficial Test. He made his Twenty20 debut for the Comilla Victorians in the 2022–23 Bangladesh Premier League, on 6 January 2023.
