= Habibur Rahman Sohan =

Bangladeshi cricketer

Personal information
- Full name: Habibur Rahman Sohan
- Born: 20 November 1999 (age 26); Sirajganj
- Height: 5 ft 6 in (168 cm)
- Batting: Right-handed
- Role: Batsman

Domestic team information
- Years: Team
- 2023–2024: Khulna Tigers
- 2023: Gazi Group Cricketers
- 2024- Present: Dhaka Capitals

Career statistics
Competition	FC	LA	T20
Matches	8	41	33
Runs scored	344	1,064	833
Batting average	21.50	26.60	30.85
100s/50s	0/2	3/2	1/4
Top score	62	117	100*
Balls bowled	24	7	6
Wickets	0	2	0
Bowling average	-	5.00	-
5 wickets in innings	0	0	0
10 wickets in match	0	0	0
Best bowling	-	1/2	-
Catches/stumpings	12/-	23/-	22/-
- Source: ESPNcricinfo, 24 November 2025

Habibur Rahman Sohan (Bengali: হাবিবুর রহমান সোহান; born 20 November 1999) is a Bangladeshi cricketer, who is a right-handed batsman.

== Early career ==
Sohan grew up in Sirajganj and played in various corporate leagues of Rajshahi. He moved to Dhaka in 2020 and received training from Sheikh Jamal Dhanmondi Club Academy.

== Domestic career ==
In November 2022, he was selected to play for Khulna Tigers following the players' draft to play for them in the 2022–23 Bangladesh Premier League. He made his Twenty20 debut for Khulna Tigers on 9 January 2023, against Chattogram Challengers. He made his List A debut for Gazi Group Cricketers on 16 March 2023, against Mohammedan Sporting Club in the 2022–23 Dhaka Premier Division Cricket League. On 17 April 2023, he scored his maiden century in List A cricket against Shinepukur Cricket Club.

In December 2023, he was named in North Zone's squad for the 2023–24 Bangladesh Cricket League One Day tournament. On 28 December 2023, in the match against Central Zone, he scored a hundred in just 49 balls, recording the fastest century by a Bangladeshi player in List A cricket.
