= ICRC International T20 Cricket Tournament for people with physical disabilities =

The ICRC International T20 Cricket Tournament was a five-team Twenty20 cricket competition for people with physical disabilities. It was held from 2–10 September 2015 in Dhaka, Bangladesh. Organised by the International Committee of the Red Cross (ICRC) in partnership with the Ministry of Youth and Sports, the Bangladesh Cricket Board, and Bangladesh Krira Shikkha Protishtan, it was the first multi-team tournament of its kind. Its slogan was ‘We Can Do It Too’. Then Prime Minister Sheikh Hasina inaugurated the tournament at the Sher-e-Bangla National Cricket Stadium (SBNCS) and Mashrafe Bin Mortaza was the brand ambassador

The opening game, between the hosts Bangladesh and England, due to be played at the National Cricket Stadium (SBNCS) had to be postponed due to rain was played with the main tournament at the Bangladesh Krira Shikkha Protishtan 3 & 4 grounds. The competing teams were Bangladesh, India (All India Cricket Association for the Physically Challenged), Pakistan (Pakistan Disabled Cricket Association), Afghanistan and England (ECB); all the teams except India's were recognised by their national cricket boards. Ten matches were played in a round-robin format, with a final played between the two best teams. England beat Pakistan in the final to become the champions in the inaugural edition of the International physically disabled cricket tournament. The physiotherapist for the England physically disabled cricket team was Catherine Smaill, a former Scottish woman cricketer..

The Bangladesh team were selected from a talent hunt camp organised by the ICRC in March 2015.

Competition schedule
Time	Teams	Venue	Score
11:00; 2 September	Bangladesh Vs. England	SBNCS	
09:30; 3 September	Pakistan Vs. Afghanistan	BKSP-3	
13:00; 3 September	India Vs. England	BKSP-4	
09:30; 4 September	India Vs. Afghanistan	BKSP-3	
13:00; 4 September	Bangladesh Vs. Pakistan	BKSP-4	
09:30; 6 September	Bangladesh Vs. Afghanistan	BKSP-3	
13:00; 6 September	India Vs. Pakistan	BKSP-4	
09:30; 7 September	Pakistan Vs. England	BKSP-3	
13:00; 7 September	Bangladesh Vs. India	BKSP-4	
09:30; 8 September	England Vs. Afghanistan	BKSP-3	

Final
Date	Teams	Venue	Score
09:30; 10 September	England Vs. Pakistan	BKSP-4	

== See also ==
- Disability in Bangladesh
- Wheelchair Cricketers Welfare Association of Bangladesh
