= Wheelchair Cricketers Welfare Association of Bangladesh =

Disability organization based in Bangladesh

Wheelchair Cricket Welfare Association Bangladesh (WCWAB; Bengali: হুইলচেয়ার ক্রিকেট ওয়েলফেয়ার অ্যাসোসিয়েশন অব বাংলাদেশ) is a national level non-government and non-profit, voluntary organization established for the development of the physically challenged people of Bangladesh. The organization was formed by wheelchair cricketer Mohammad Mohasin.

The organization has been working for the physically challenged people since 2010, aiming to incorporate them in the mainstream society. In 2016, the organization registered with the Social Welfare Department of Bangladesh. WCWAB have elected management board. The warriors on wheelchairs started their journey of playing cricket in 2010. Since then, Bangladeshi Wheelchair cricket players have participated in major tournaments like ICRC International Cricket Tournament in Bangladesh and Asia Cup in India.

WCWAB was one of 30 youth-led organizations to receive a Joy Bangla Youth Award from Young Bangla in 2017, for their work in sports development.

== Wheelchair cricket launched in Bangladesh ==
First ever wheelchair cricket tournament in Bangladesh launched in 2016 by Imago Sports Management in association with Wheelchair Cricket Welfare Association Bangladesh. Thirty Six (36) Wheelchair Cricketers (Twenty Five (25) from outside of Dhaka) participated in this daylong tournament. For most of the wheelchair users this was the very first time they participated in a competitive sports match.

WCWAB is governed by its elected board. Mohammad Mohsin is the President of WCWAB.
