= Unmukt Chand =

Indian cricketer

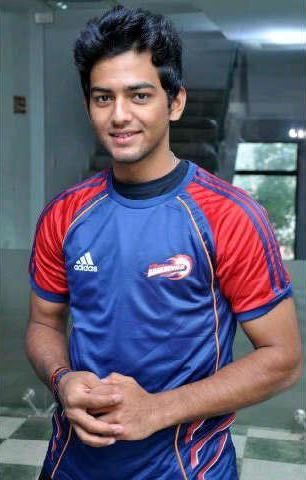

Personal information
- Full name: Unmukt Bharat Thakur Chand
- Born: 26 March 1993 (age 33); Delhi, India
- Height: 5 ft 7 in (1.70 m)
- Batting: Right-handed
- Bowling: Right-arm off break
- Role: Batsman

Domestic team information
- Years: Team
- 2010–2018: Delhi
- 2011–2013: Delhi Daredevils (squad no. 9)
- 2010-2013: North Zone
- 2014: Rajasthan Royals
- 2015–2016: Mumbai Indians (squad no. 15)
- 2017: Prime Bank Cricket Club
- 2018: Dhanmondi Sports Club cricket team (squad no. 9)
- 2019–2020: Uttarakhand (squad no. 9)
- 2021-present: Silicon Valley Strikers
- 2021-22: Melbourne Renegades
- 2022-23: Lumbini All Stars
- 2023: Chattogram Challengers
- 2023-present: Los Angeles Knight Riders
- 2024: Lumbini Lions

Career statistics
Competition	FC	LA	T20
Matches	67	120	102
Runs scored	3,379	4,505	2,139
Batting average	31.57	41.33	23.00
100s/50s	8/16	7/32	3/10
Top score	151	127	125
Balls bowled	151	192	–
Wickets	1	6	–
Bowling average	98.00	37.16	–
5 wickets in innings	0	0	–
10 wickets in match	0	0	–
Best bowling	1/12	3/59	–
Catches/stumpings	77/0	52/4	61/3
- Source: ESPNcricinfo, 1 January 2026

Unmukt Chand (born 26 March 1993) is an Indian cricketer based in the United States. He is a right-handed top order batsman who currently plays for the Los Angeles Knight Riders in Major League Cricket. He has played for Delhi and Uttarakhand in Indian domestic cricket tournaments, the Mumbai Indians & the Delhi Capitals in the Indian Premier League, and the India Under-19 cricket team, who he captained to victory in the 2012 U-19 Cricket World Cup. In August 2021, Chand announced his retirement from playing cricket in India to move to the United States.

== Early life ==
Unmukt Chand was born in a Kumaoni Rajput family to Bharat Chand Thakur and Rajeshwari Chand, who were both teachers. He is originally from Pithoragarh (Siltham) District of Uttarakhand. He moved from DPS Noida to Modern School, Barakhamba Road in the 9th standard.

== Career ==
=== Early career ===
Unmukt Chand scored 499 runs during his first stint with the Delhi U-19 team. The 499 runs include 2 centuries and 1 half-century. His outstanding performance in the U-19s gave him a place in the Delhi senior team. He scored 151 runs on a seaming track against a seasoned Railways attack in the 2010-11 Ranji Trophy. That year he also scored two half-centuries against Mumbai and Saurashtra. He scored 400 runs in five matches. He played in the Vinoo Mankad Trophy and the Cooch Behar Trophy at the junior level.

=== Captaincy ===
Unmukt Chand was named the captain of the Delhi U-19 team and the North Zone U-19 team. He then went on to become the captain of the India Under-19 cricket team for the quadrangular series that was held in Vishakhapatnam, India. The quadrangular series included the U-19 teams from India, Sri Lanka, West Indies and Australia. He scored an unbeaten 122 against Sri Lanka and two fifties against Australia and West Indies. He ended the tournament with 336 runs from seven outings, just one behind Australia's Cameron Bancroft. He also participated in the Syed Mushtaq Ali Trophy later that season. Under his captaincy, India also won the U-19 World Cup in Australia.

In April 2012, India U-19 cricket team played a quadrangular series in Australia involving the hosts, along with England and New Zealand. Batting at three, Chand scored an impressive 94 against England in the semi-final to help India win the match by 63 runs. He followed it up with a blistering century against Australia in the final – an unbeaten 112, which included 9 fours and 6 sixes – to take India to an emphatic 7-wicket victory. India won the tournament under Chand's captaincy, who ended with 281 runs from 5 matches, only six runs short of the tournament's highest run-getter Daniel Bell-Drummond.

In June 2012, playing in the ACC Under-19s Asia Cup, Chand rose to the occasion once again with 116 against Sri Lanka in the semi-final, before scoring 121 against Pakistan in the final. He won the Man of the Match award in both games. He was the highest run-scorer in the tournament with 286 runs from 3 matches.

On 26 August 2012, Chand led the India U-19s to victory in the 2012 ICC Under-19 Cricket World Cup in Australia. His counterpart William Bosisto's half-century had rescued Australia from 38 for 4 to a score of 225 in the final, but Chand's 130-run stand with Smit Patel ensured India won with more than two overs to spare, with Chand scoring a captain's knock of 111* in 130 balls which consisted of 6 sixes and 7 fours to defeat Australia.

On 3 March 2013, Chand scored 116 for Delhi in the Vijay Hazare Trophy final against Assam to show his knack for scoring big hundreds in tournament finals. Delhi went on to win the game by 95 runs and the title for the first time.

=== IPL career ===
Unmukt made his IPL debut in 2011 for Delhi Daredevils but is mostly recognised for incident in 2013 when he got clean bowled for a first ball duck by Brett Lee in the season opener against the Kolkata Knight Riders. He was purchased by the Rajasthan Royals during the IPL 7 Auction. He was picked up by the Mumbai Indians in the 2015 season, where he won his first IPL title, despite not playing in most of the games.

=== Syed Mushtaq Ali Trophy 2012–13 ===
Unmukt scored 321 runs at an average of 35.66 with a strike rate reaching 140 for Delhi, where was the highest run-scorer. He scored back-to-back centuries, first against Kerala where he scored 105 off 67 balls, and then against Gujarat, scoring 125 off just 63 deliveries. Delhi was upset by Odisha in the semi-finals, where he failed to score.

=== Minor League Cricket ===
Unmukt made his MiLC debut on 14 August 2021, where he was bowled for naught off 3 deliveries. Unmukt topped the runs scorers list for 2021 in the competition with 612 runs from 16 innings as he led his team, the Silicon Valley Strikers, to the championship title. He transferred over to the Atlanta Lightning for the 2023 season.

=== Big Bash League ===
Unmukt made his BBL debut for the Melbourne Renegades on 18 January 2022, becoming the first Indian male to play in the Big Bash (although he was officially a United States international).

=== Major League Cricket ===
Unmukt was signed by the Los Angeles Knight Riders in the player draft, ahead of the inaugural Major League Cricket season.

=== Bangladesh Premier League ===
In November 2022, Ummukt was selected to play for the Chattogram Challengers, following the players' draft for the 2022–23 Bangladesh Premier League. He became the first Indian to feature in the Bangladesh Premier League (although he was officially a United States international).

== Commentary ==
Unmukt started commentating during the 2020 U-19 Cricket World Cup finals. He has also commentated for Star Sports, covering the Caribbean Premier League. He also joined the Big Bash League as a Hindi commentator. He was one of the commentators in the 2022 Under-19 Men's Cricket World Cup.

== Honors and awards ==
- 2012 Under-19 Cricket World Cup winning captain
- 2012 Under-19 Cricket World Cup Final Man of the Match
- Castrol Junior Cricketer of the Year for 2011–12
- CEAT Indian youngster of the year 2012
- 2015 IPL title with Mumbai Indians
- 2021 Minor Cricket League USA winning captain, also scoring the most runs in the competition

== Books ==
Chand has penned his memories of the U19 WC into a book, The Sky is the Limit (2013). The book chronicles Unmukt's rise as a cricketer, from his childhood days to the World Cup victory and how he came to represent his country, lead his team to victory - complete with a captain's match-winning knock - and bring home the coveted trophy. The victory was India U-19 team's first World Cup win outside Asia. Rahul Dravid, V.V.S. Laxman and Sanjay Manjrekar wrote forewords for the book.
