= Masters' Cricket Carnival =

KD Lights Comedy

- Administrator: Imago Sports Management
- Cricket format: Twenty20
- Tournament format(s): Group stage and playoffs
- Host: Bangladesh
- Champions: Beximco Dhaka
- Participants: 6
- Matches: 9
- Player of the series: Mohammad Rafique (cricketer)

Masters' Cricket Carnival - Bangladesh (MCC-Bangladesh) is an initiative of former national cricketers of Bangladesh. Every year, the tournament takes place in different cities of Bangladesh and is contested by former national & first class cricketers of Bangladesh.

With the support of the Bangladesh Cricket Board, Imago Sports Management organized the first ever franchise based Master Cricket Tournament in Bangladesh. The tournament featured more than 100 former cricketers that included 10 former captains. The players were divided into six teams: Expo All Stars, Confidence Group Dhaka Metro, JB Group Dhaka Division, Gemcon Khulna and Renaissance Rajshahi. A player's draft event was organized where the teams picked the players of their choices.

The group stage of the tournament was held from September 28 to October 2, 2016, in Coxs Baxzar at Sheikh Kamal International Cricket Stadium and the final was held at Sher-e-Bangla National Cricket Stadium, Mirpur. Gemcon Khulna Masters beat Expo All stars in the final to clinch the first Masters Cricket Carnival Trophy. Along with the title sponsor Walton and Powered by Sponsor Heidelberg Cement Bangladesh, companies like Fresh Water, Acme and Fu-Wand Foods were official partners of the tournament. Channel i, one of the leading channels of Bangladesh was the official broadcast partner.

Imago Sports Management holds the sole right for Masters' Cricket Carnival.

== Teams and players (2016) ==
JB Group Dhaka Masters: Ishtiaque Ahmed, (mentor), Naimur Rahman Durjoy (captain), Sanwar Hossain, Shahriar Hossain Bidyut, Mehrab Hossain Opi, Saiful Islam Khan, Monirul Islam Taj, Shahnewaz Kabir Shuvo, Rashedul Haque Sumon, Sajjad Kadir, Zakir Hasan, Dipu Roy Chowdhury, Anisur Rahman, Jalal Younus and Abu Haider Ripon.

Confidence Group Dhaka Metro Masters: ASM Farque (mentor), Khaled Mahmud Sujan (captain), Mohammad Rafiq, Niamur Rahman Rahul, Nasir Ahmed Nasu, ASM Moniruzzaman, Imran Parvez Ripon, Anisul Hakim, Iqbal Hossain, Imran Hamid Partho, Mir Ziauddin Ahmed, Sabbir Khan Shafin, Tanveer Ahmed Timir and Ashfaq Rahim.

Renaissance Group Rajshahi: Shanewaz Kabir Shanu (mentor), Khaled Mashud Pilot (captain), Alamgir Kabir, Rafiqul Islam Khan, Saifullah Khan Zem, Hannan Sarkar, Abdullah Khan Biplob, Trikul Islam, Morshed Ali Khan Suman, Gazi Alamgir, Mushfiqur Rahman Babu, Jahangir Alam, Shariful Haque Plabon, Umar Sharif Khan and Akter Ahmed Sipar.

Gemcon Group Khulna Masters: Umar Khalid Rumi (mentor), Habibul Bashar Sumon (captain), Monjurul Islam, Hasanuzzaman Jhondu, M Selim, Jamal Babu, Mahmudul Hasan Rana, Murad Khan, Ali Imran Rajan, Harunur Rashid Liton, Shafiuddin Ahmed Babu, Tasrikul Islam Totam, Touhidul Islam Chapal, Zesan Hasib and Mizanur Rahman Patwari.

Expo All Stars Masters: Rokibul Hasan (mentor), Selim Shahed (captain), Hasibul Hossain Shanto, Ashanul Haque Sejan, Javed Omar Belim, Talha Jubayer, Azam Iqbal, Masudur Rahman, Anisur Rahman, Lavlu Rahman, Syed Adil Ahmed, Sohel Hossain Pappu, Niaz Morshed Nahid, Baki Billah Himel, Fahim Muntasir and Mahbub Anam.

Ispahani Chittagong Masters: Azhar Hossain, (mentor), Akram Khan (cricketer) (captain), Minhajul Abedin, Enamul Haque Moni, Tareq Aziz Khan, Aftab Ahmed, Touhidul Hossain Shamol, Humayun Kabir, Anwar Hossain Monir, Jubair Ishtiak Ahmed, Fazle Rabbi Khan Rubel, Nurul Abedin Nobel, Afzal Khan, Fazle Hasan Khan and Mir Akter Uddin Ahmed.
