= Deafness in Bangladesh =

Deafness in Bangladesh is a major health issue. About 9.6% of the population of Bangladesh (about 13.7 million people as estimated from the 2011 census), is deaf or hard of hearing (having a loss of 40 dB or more). Hearing loss in any degree is present in 34.6% of the population (49.2 million), and profound hearing loss (a loss of 90 dB of more) is present in 1.2% of the population (1.7 million). The sign language used in Bangladesh is called Bangla Sign Language (BdSL). Deaf people in Bangladesh often do not have access to treatment or education, and commonly face discrimination. There are many Deaf associations in Bangladesh.

== Causes ==
Most hearing loss in Bangladesh arises in adulthood, with people over 60 years of age and people of lower socio-economic status being the most likely to have significant hearing loss. Common causes of hearing loss in Bangladesh include impacted ear wax, chronic suppurative otitis media (CSOM), and otitis media with effusion (OME). Congenital deafness, excessive urban noise, and the use of ototoxic drugs also contribute to the high rate of hearing loss in Bangladesh.

== Bangla sign language ==
=== History ===
Bangla Sign Language (BdSL), also known as Bengali Sign Language or Bangladeshi Sign Language, is believed to have originated at the Calcutta Deaf and Dumb School, founded in 1893. The students at this school created their own signing system independent of the signing system in Delhi and spread it to their home communities across what is now West Bengal and Bangladesh. From 1947 until its independence in 1971, Bangladesh was split from India and was known as East Pakistan. Millions of Hindus and Muslims, including several thousand Deaf Hindus and Muslims, migrated between West Bengal and Bangladesh during this period, which allowed the signs in these two areas to remain similar. After this period, the relative lack of migration between West Bengal and Bangladesh resulted in the divergence of this signing system into West Bengal Sign Language (WBSL) and Bangla Sign Language (BdSL).

A Bangla Sign Language Dictionary was also published in 1994 with the intention of creating a uniform and standardized sign language across Bangladesh. On February 1, 2009, Bangladesh Prime Minister Sheikh Hasina declared Bangla Sign Language an official language of Bangladesh. In addition, February 7 is Bangla Sign Language Day and has been recognized since 2013.

=== Differences from other South Asian sign languages ===
Scholars disagree on whether BdSL and WBSL are distinct from Indo-Pakistani Sign Language (IPSL), or are considered a dialect of IPSL. Johnson and Johnson (2016) found that the sign languages used in Kolkata and Delhi had a 75.0% lexical similarity, which is enough to suggest that the two languages are separate. Bangla Sign Language and West Bengal Sign Language are lexically very similar, but identity differences play a large role in the Deaf communities of both regions, and these communities have given separate names to the two languages.

== Prevention and treatment ==
=== Limited access ===
In Bangladesh, facilities for detection and treatment of hearing diseases are uncommon in primary and secondary care. Surgery is too expensive for most people living in Bangladesh, and there are also a lack of trained surgeons. Bangladesh also does not have enough hearing aids to supply to the estimated 4 to 6 percent of the population who need them.

=== Assistive technology ===
Several computer programs are being devised to recognize BdSL hand signs. These programs are generally designed to facilitate conversation between signing people and hearing non-signing people by recognizing and translating signs in real time. Some programs use gloves worn by the signer to detect signs, while others use a trained convolutional neural network (CNN) to recognize hand signs from images. Implementations of the latter technique have achieved 98% to 99% accuracy in recognizing a subset of signs when tested in an experimental setting.

The use of hearing aids correlates with a greater enjoyment of human rights in Bangladesh. One study showed that Bangladeshis who used hearing aids were healthier, more educated, more involved in their work, better listeners, better walkers, and more likely to use public transportation when compared to Bangladeshis who did not use hearing aids.

A 2019 study by Emmett et al. demonstrated that cochlear implants are cost-effective in Bangladesh, and would reduce Disability-Adjusted Life Years (a measure of reduction of quality of life due to a disability) from 6.03 years to 1.31 years on average.

== Deaf education ==
Four schools were established for the blind and deaf in Bangladesh in 1962. In 1992, there were only seven schools for the deaf in Bangladesh with a total capacity for 420 students. There is a lack of trained educators and materials for Deaf students, and as a result most Deaf Bangladeshis are undereducated, especially those living in rural areas. There are also no full-time residential Deaf schools in Bangladesh.

The 2019 study by Emmett et al. showed Deaf education to be cost-effective in Bangladesh, and was found to reduce DALYs from 6.03 years to 2.03 years on average. This study also found that the average lifetime cost for Deaf education in Bangladesh was $49,041 per individual, the highest cost of all nations surveyed in South and Southeast Asia.

== Human rights issues ==
Poverty, unemployment, and lack of education affect many Deaf Bangladeshis. Deaf Bangladeshis often have to rely on hearing people for help, but most hearing people in Bangladesh are unaware about the issues Deaf people face. Employment rights for Deaf people are not protected, and as such many Deaf Bangladeshis struggle to find employment, and even if they do, they are often not paid enough to be self-sufficient. Oralism is also a big issue in Bangladesh, where the oralists who want to integrate Deaf people into hearing society often drown out the opinions of Deaf people who oppose them.

The lack of knowledge and awareness about deafness, as well as stigma against deafness, often leads to inadequate treatment. Deaf people in Bangladesh often attempt to hide their Deafness and may refuse to use hearing aids so as not to reveal their disability.

== Deaf associations ==
=== BNFD ===
The Bangladesh National Federation of the Deaf (BNFD) was founded in 1963 and is the oldest Disabled People's Organization (DPO) in Bangladesh. The organization's goal is to educate and train Deaf people throughout Bangladesh, advocate for their rights, and promote diversity in the Deaf and Hard of Hearing community. The BNFD is focused on establishing and improving schools for hearing and speech impaired people (including strengthening the already existing Dhaka Deaf High School), providing free vocational training for Deaf people, teaching sign language, and creating a hostel for Deaf students. BNFD is supported by the government of Bangladesh, the Bangladesh National Social Welfare Council, the World Federation of the Deaf (WFD)—of which BNFD is also a member—and the Norwegian Association of the Deaf.

=== CDD ===
The Centre for Disability in Development, established in 1996, is a non-profit organization that advocates for inclusivity for people with disabilities. CDD's mission is to provide supports for people with disabilities so that they can participate in mainstream society, as well as to educate the general public about the importance of inclusivity for people with disabilities.

=== SDSL ===
The Society of the Deaf and Sign Language Users (SDSL) was founded in 2008 with the mission of advocating for sign language users in Bangladesh. The SDSL aims for Bangla Sign Language users to receive the same access to information and resources as hearing people, and for all Deaf children to receive education in sign language. The SDSL also advocates for more accessibility for sign language users in the media, particularly through the use of qualified television interpreters.

=== Sound Hearing by 2030 ===
Sound Hearing by 2030 is an initiative proposed by the World Health Organization to eliminate 90% of deafness and hearing impairment in Bangladesh by the year 2030. This would be achieved though programs for early detection and treatment of hearing loss, programs to train medical professionals in hearing loss, and programs to spread community awareness and involvement.

== See also ==
- Disability in Bangladesh
