= 2022–23 Bangladesh Premier League players' draft =

2023 Bangladesh Premier League players draft

General information
- Sport: Cricket
- Date: 23 November 2022
- Time: 12:00 pm BST
- Location: Le Meridian, Dhaka

Overview
- League: Bangladesh Premier League
- Team: 7
- Expansion team: 1
- Expansion season: 2023

The players' draft for the 2022–23 Bangladesh Premier League took place on 23 November 2022 at Le Meridian Hotel in Dhaka.

== Players draft rules ==
1. Each team was required to have at least 12 players, including ten local and two foreign players.
2. Each team could sign only one local player through direct signing and at least nine local players were to be picked from the draft
3. There was no maximum limit on signing foreign players both directly and through the draft.

== Salary cap ==
=== Local players ===
216 local players were listed into seven categories with the following salary cap:-

- Category A – ৳80 lakh (US$65,000)
- Category B – ৳50 lakh (US$41,000)
- Category C – ৳30 lakh (US$24,000)
- Category D – ৳20 lakh (US$16,000)
- Category E – ৳15 lakh (US$12,000)
- Category F – ৳10 lakh (US$8,100)
- Category G – ৳5 lakh (US$4,100)

=== Foreign players ===
- Category A – US$80,000
- Category B – US$60,000
- Category C – US$40,000
- Category D – US$30,000
- Category E – US$20,000

== Players list ==
This is the list of local players listed in the draft.

=== A Category ===
Mushfiqur Rahim, Mahmudullah Riyad, Liton Kumar Das.

=== B Category ===
Najmul Hossain Shanto, Mohammad Saifuddin, Mosaddek Hossain Saikat, Mehidy Hasan Miraz, Imrul Kayes, Mehidy Hasan, Nasum Ahmed.

=== C Category ===
Rubel Hossain, Yasir Ali Chowdhury, Enamul Haque Bijay, Mominul Haque, Naeem Sheikh, Mohammad Shoriful Islam, Soumya Sarkar, Kamrul Islam Rabbi, Taijul Islam, Mohammad Mithun, Mohammad Saif Hassan, Shubhagat Home Chowdhury, Mohammad Mukidul Islam Mochad, Ebadat Hossain, Sabbir Rahman, Munim Shahriar, Mehdi Hasan Rana, Nahidul Islam, Irfan Shukur, Fazle Mahmud Rabbi, Mohammad Shamim Hasan, Roni Talukder, Syed Khaled Ahmed, Naeem Hasan, Zakir Ali Anik.

=== D Category ===
Sanjamul Islam, Mohammad Zakir Hasan, Tanveer Islam, Parvez Hossain Imon, Rezaur Rahman, Tanjid Hasan Tamim, Mahmudul Hasan Joy, Nasir Hossain, Junaid Siddiqui, Akbar Ali, Marshal Ayyub, Nadif Chowdhury, Enamul Haque Jr., Muktar Ali, Alauddin Babu, Naeem Islam, Shafiqul Islam, Nabeel Samad, Alok Kapali, Abu Zayed Chowdhury Rahi, Sohag Gazi, Mohammad Al Amin Hossain (Senior), Shamsur Rahman, Arafat Sani, Abu Haider Roni, Touhid Hriday, Mohammad Saikat Ali, Ziaur Rahman, Ariful Haque, Mohammad Shafiul Islam, Zahirul Islam (wicketkeeper), Farhad Reza, Mritunjoy Chowdhury, Mahidul Angkan, Nazmul Islam Apu.

=== E Category ===
Mohammad Al Amin Hossain (Junior), Sanjit Saha, Mohammad Tanbir Haider Khan, Mohammad Ashraful, Mahmudul Hasan Limon, Mohammad Abdul Majeed, Mizanur Rahman, Monir Hossain Khan, Imranuzzaman, Mohammad Ilyas, Suhrawardy Shuvo, Mehdi Maruf, Rakibul Hassan Sr., Saqline Sajib, Mohr Sheikh Antar, Dhiman Ghosh, Suman Khan, Rahatul Ferdous Javed, Rabiul Haque, Kazi Anik, Salman Hossain, Taibur Rahman Parvez, Maishukur Rahman Rial, Anisul Islam Imon, Amit Hasan, Pritam Kumar, Salahuddin Shakeel, Ruel Mia, Noman Chowdhury, Pinak Ghosh, Sadman Islam, Ashikuzzaman, Noor Hossain Saddam, Mohammad Sharifullah, Aminul Islam Biblab, Mohammad Hasan Murad, Abdul Halim, Farhad Hossain, Asif Hasan, Jabid Hossain, Abu Sayem, Zubair Hossain Likhan, Mohammad Naeem Islam (Jr.), Sazzadul Haque Ripon, Enamul Haque Jr (pace bowler), Masum Khan Tutul, Zahid Javed, Shamsul Islam, Fardin Hossain Ani, Rabiul Islam Ravi, Rubel Mia, Asaduzzaman Piyal, Sajjad Hossain Sabbir, Mushfiq Hasan, Tauhid Tarek Khan, Sabbir Hossain, Ripon Mandal, Mofizul Islam Robin.Mohiuddin Tarek, Manik Khan, Raihan Uddin, Alis Al Islam, Sayem Alam, Zahiduzzaman Khan, Moin Khan, Sanaur Rahman, Jasimuddin, AKS Swadhin, Jawad, Mohammad Ashikuzzaman, Nahid Rana, Mushfiq Hasan, Rakibul Hasan Jr., Nazmul Saqib.

=== F Category ===
Nihad-uz-Zaman, Mohaiminul Khan Chowdhury, Abhishek Mitra, Johnny Talukder, Minhajul Abedin Afridi, Azmir Ahmed, Islamul Ahsan Abir, Aich Mollah, Taufiq Khan Tushar, Rayan Rafsan Rahman, Nahid Rana, Mamun Hossain, Mainul Islam, Tipu Sultan, Mohammad Nuruzzaman, Mainul Sohail, Abdur Rashid, Abdullah Al Mamun, Yasin Arafat Mishu.Iftekhar Sajjad Roni, Mohammad Hasanuzzaman, Shahadat Hossain Dipu, Ajmir Ahmed, Shaheen Alam, Nazmul Hossain Milan, Imtiaz Hossain Tanna, Mohammad Tasamul Haque Rubel, Amit Majumdar, Delwar Hossain, Shahbaz Chauhan, Shahadat Hossain Rajib, Shahnaz Ahmed, Ahmed Sadiqur Rahman, Shehnaz Ahmed, Rafsan Al Mahmud, Mohammad Azim, Mohammad Shakeel Ahmed, Rakin Ahmed, Ali Ahmed Manik, Ifran Hussain.

=== G Category ===
Shubashis Roy, Asadullah Al Ghalib, Russell Al Mamun, Habibur Rahman Johnny, Mohammad Asif, Imran Ali, Hussain Ali, Biswajit Halder, Sujan Howlader, Shahanur Rahman, Jai Raj Sheikh, Shafiul Hayat Hriday, Mehrab Hossain Josi, Tauhidul Islam Russell, Zainul Islam, Mahmudul Haque Sentu, Nabin Islam, Golam Kabir Sohail, Kazi Kamrul Islam, Shakeel Hossain, Nahid Hasan, Shakhawat Hossain, Ahmed Abidul Haque, Mohammad Rakib, Mohammad Roni Hossain, Mahmudul Islam Anik, Alamin Raju, Samsul Islam Anil, Abdur Rahman, Zakirul Islam, Habibur Rahman Sohan.

== Drafted players ==
This is the list of drafted players in the players draft.

=== Fortune Barishal ===
- Mahmudullah Riyad
- Mehidy Hasan Miraz
- Ebdaot Hossain
- Anamul Haque Bijoy
- Kamrul Islam Rabbi
- Fazle Rabbi
- Haider Ali
- Chaturanga De Silva
- Khaled Ahmed
- Saif Hassan
- Qazi Onik
- Sunjamul Islam
- Salman Hossain.

=== Chattogram Challengers ===
- Mrittunjoy Chowdhury
- Shuvagata Hom
- Mehedi Hasan Rana
- Irfan Sukkur
- Mehedi Maruf
- Ziaur Rahman
- Max O Dowd
- Unmukt Chand
- Taijul Islam
- Abu Jayed Rahi
- Farhad Reza
- Towfiq Khan Tushar

=== Comilla Victorians ===
- Litton Das
- Imrul Kayes
- Mosaddek Hossain
- Tanvir Islam
- Ashiqur Zaman
- Jaker Ali
- Sean Williams
- Chadwick Walton
- Shykat Ali
- Mahidul Islam Ankon
- Abu Hider Rony
- Nayeem Hasan
- Mukidul Islam Mugdho.

=== Dhaka Dominators ===
- Soumya Sarkar
- Mohammad Mithun
- Nasir Hossain
- Shan Masood
- Ahmed Shahzad
- Alok Kapali
- Monir Hossain Khan
- Ariful Haque
- Mukhtar Ali
- Mizanur Rahman
- Delwar Hossain
- Usman Ghani
- Salman Irshad
- Al Amin Hossain
- Arafat Sunny
- Shoriful Islam.

=== Sylhet Strikers ===
- Najmul Hossain Shanto
- Zakir Hasan
- Mushfiqur Rahim
- Towhid Hridoy
- Tom Moores
- Gulbadin Naib
- Akbar Ali
- Mohammad Sharifullah
- Tanjim Sakib
- Taibur Rahman
- Rubel Hossain
- Nabil Samad
- Najmul Islam Opu
- Rejaur Rahman Raja.

=== Rangpur Riders ===
- Naim Sheikh
- Parvez Hossain Emon
- Rony Talukder
- Rakibul Hasan Jnr
- Shamim Hossain Patwary
- Azmatullah Omarzai
- Aaron Jones
- Alauddin Babu
- Mahedi Hasan
- Ripon Mondal
- Hasan Mahmud

=== Khulna Tigers ===
- Mohammad Saifuddin
- Yasir Ali Rabbi
- Nasum Ahmed
- Nahidul Islam
- Munim Shahriar
- Sabbir Rahman
- Dasun Shanaka
- Shofiqul Islam
- Pritom Kumar
- Habibur Rahman Sohan
- Mahmudul Hasan Joy
- Paul Van Meekeren

== Direct signing ==
This is the list of direct signings of every team.

Chattogram Challengers	Comilla Victorians	Dhaka Dominators	Fortune Barishal	Khulna Tigers	Rangpur Riders	Sylhet Strikers
Afif Hossain (c); Vishwa Fernando; Ashan Priyanjan; Curtis Campher	Mustafizur Rahman; Mohammad Rizwan; Shaheen Afridi; Brandon King; Hasan Ali; Khushdil Shah; Abrar Ahmed; Josh Cobb; Mohammad Nabi	Taskin Ahmed; Chamika Karunaratne; Dilshan Munaweera	Shakib Al Hasan (c); Chris Gayle; Rahkeem Cornwall; Ibrahim Zadran; Karim Janat; Iftikhar Ahmed; Mohammad Wasim; Rahmanullah Gurbaz; Kusal Perera; Usman Qadir; Naveen-ul-Haq	Tamim Iqbal (c); Wahab Riaz; Naseem Shah; Avishka Fernando; Azam Khan	Nurul Hasan; Mohammad Nawaz; Haris Rauf; Shoaib Malik; Sikandar Raza; Pathum Nissanka; Jeffrey Vandersay	Mashrafe Mortaza (c); Thisara Perera; Mohammad Amir; Dhananjaya de Silva; Kamindu Mendis; Colin Ackermann; Ryan Burl; Mohammad Haris
