= Mohammad Mohasin =

Bangladeshi cricketer

Personal information
- Born: 6 October 1987 (age 39); Gazipur, Bangladesh
- Batting: Left-handed
- Role: Wicket-keeper

International information
- National side: Bangladesh (2014–present)

Mohammad Mohasin (born 6 October 1987) is a Bangladeshi wheelchair cricketer, disability rights advocate and founder of multiple sports initiatives for persons with disabilities. He is best known for his pioneering efforts in developing wheelchair cricket in Bangladesh and for establishing the Bangladesh Cricket Association for the Physically Challenged (BCAPC) and the Wheelchair Cricketers Welfare Association of Bangladesh (WCWAB). He is the current captain of the Bangladesh Wheelchair Cricket Team.

== Early life and background ==
Mohasin was born in Morkun East Para, Gazipur District, Bangladesh. At the age of one, he was affected by polio, which resulted in the loss of sensation and mobility in his legs. Growing up in a humble family, Mohasin faced significant challenges due to his disability, including limited access to education and social stigma. However, despite these hardships, he developed a deep passion for cricket from a young age.

== Interest in cricket ==
During his teenage years, Mohasin began participating in informal cricket matches with classmates and local youth. His enthusiasm for the sport and determination to play despite being in a wheelchair drew attention from the local community. His batting skills and energetic presence made him a popular figure, and cricket became a central part of his identity and social life.

Motivated to create more opportunities for persons with disabilities in sports, Mohasin founded the Bangladesh Cricket Association for the Physically Challenged (BCAPC). The organization aimed to promote cricket among individuals with physical disabilities and provide them with a platform to develop their skills and compete nationally and internationally.

In 2014, under Mohasin's leadership, the Bangladeshi team won the Taj Mahal Trophy championship in Agra, India. The victory was a landmark achievement for the country's physically challenged athletes. The team received national recognition. This milestone helped bring attention to the growing potential of disability sports in the country.

== Establishment of WCWAB ==
While attempting to participate in international disability cricket tournaments, Mohasin learned that wheelchair users were often excluded under prevailing rules. Undeterred, he and his colleague Polash initiated efforts to establish a separate platform for wheelchair athletes. In 2016, they co-founded the Wheelchair Cricket Welfare Association Bangladesh (WCWAB) to represent wheelchair users in national and international cricket events.

== Wheelchair cricket world cup ==
The Bangladesh Wheelchair Cricket Team is scheduled to participate in the inaugural Wheelchair Cricket World Cup 2025, which will be held in Pakistan from 30 September to 9 October 2025. The tournament is set to take place in Lahore and Faisalabad. It will be organized by the Pakistan Wheelchair Cricket Council (PWCC), a founding member of the International Wheelchair Cricket Council (IWCC).

== Personal life ==
Mohasin is married to Liza Akter. The couple have two daughters.
