= Fico Sports Hub =

Defunct futsal venue in Jurong West, Singapore

Coordinates: 1.35476°N 103.70265°E

Fico Sports Hub was a private 6-hectare recreation centre located at 2 Jurong West St 25, Singapore, then the largest Futsal (5-a-side indoor football) arena in Asia and the first in Asia with water football facilities, which closed its doors to customers on 4 April 2011.

A notable architectural feature of Fico Sports Hub is its white tensile membrane roof, which is designed to keep out the heat and rain over its eight futsal pitches, while embracing an "open" concept, as instead of sidewalls, with nets used to surround the pitches to allow the flow of natural breeze.

The recreation centre was used for water football (football in ankle-deep water), beach volleyball and beach football activities. The beach volleyball and beach football courts use sand that was specially imported for the Swatch FIVB World Tour '2007 tournament in Sentosa and the soccer court was an inflatable water soccer court bought from overseas.

== Concept ==
Established in early 2007 by current director Gary Lau, Fico Sports Hub has affiliations to the Football Association of Singapore (FAS).

Fico's mission is to promote sports, especially futsal, amongst Singaporeans. By providing an ideal venue for amateur footballers to hold their kickabout sessions in land-scarce Singapore, Fico hopes to raise the profile of football in the country. In addition, Fico's Management also hope that some of the young talented footballers in Singapore can develop their skills through futsal.

And with the addition of more sports facilities in the near future (see 'Future Developments'), as well as leasing out the 19 available retail outlets at the venue, Fico aims to "provide the ultimate combination of sporting and leisure action, promising a unique experience for everyone."

=== Corporate Events ===
Besides being a venue for social kickabout sessions, Fico Sports Hub also hosts and provides event planning and management services for corporate events such as football tournaments, family day events and sports carnivals.

On 23 June 2007, Fico Sports Hub hosted the Diva La Futbol V tournament, an annual women soccer event organised by the Singapore Management University (SMU) Women Soccer Club. The fifth edition of the tournament saw 56 teams – the largest ever number of teams in the history of the event – taking part, making it the largest women soccer event in Singapore.

== See also ==
- Futsal
- Sports in Singapore
