= 2022–23 Bangladesh Premier League =

Professional cricket league in Bangladesh

Bangladesh Premier League 2023
- Dates: 6 January – 16 February 2023
- Administrator: Bangladesh Cricket Board
- Cricket format: Twenty20
- Tournament format(s): Double round-robin and playoffs
- Host: Bangladesh
- Champions: Comilla Victorians (4th title)
- Participants: 7
- Matches: 46
- Player of the series: Najmul Hossain Shanto (Sylhet Strikers)
- Most runs: Najmul Hossain Shanto (Sylhet Strikers) (516)
- Most wickets: Tanvir Islam (Comilla Victorians); Hasan Mahmud (Rangpur Riders) (17 Wickets each)
- Official website: bplt20.com.bd

The Bangladesh Premier League 2023, also known as BPL Season 9 or Ispahani BPL 2023 (for sponsorship reasons) was the ninth season of the Bangladesh Premier League (BPL), the top-level professional Twenty20 cricket league in Bangladesh, organized by the Bangladesh Cricket Board (BCB). In July 2022, after the International Cricket Council accommodated the month of January and February for this league in its Future Tours Programme, the BCB announced the schedule of the BPL for the next three seasons. Accordingly, the ninth season was scheduled to be held from 5 January to 16 February in 2023. BCB also decided to increase the number of teams to 7 and to sell the franchise rights for 3 years from this season.

BCB announced the list of franchise owners in September 2022, with five of the previous six franchises retaining ownership and the return of Rangpur Riders after two seasons. On 24 December 2022, BCB announced the fixtures for this season with two matches to be played per day in the group stage and having reserve days for all of the knockout matches.

In the final, Comilla Victorians defeated Sylhet Strikers by 7 wickets to win their second successive and overall fourth title.

== Draft and squads ==
Before the draft Fortune Barishal signed up 10 players through direct recruitment, the most by any team. Unmukt Chand, former Indian cricketer also registered for the draft, being the only Indian so far to have registered in BPL's players' draft. Before the draft, each team was allowed to directly recruit only one domestic player and unlimited number of foreign players.

The players' draft was held on 23 November 2022.

Each team was allowed to pick a minimum of 12 players from the draft, at least ten local players and two foreign players. But there was no maximum limit of how many foreign players could be picked from the draft.

Chattogram Challengers Coach: Julian Wood	Comilla Victorians Coach: Mohammad Salahuddin	Dhaka Dominators Coach: Chaminda Vaas	Fortune Barishal Coach: Nazmul Abedin Fahim	Khulna Tigers Coach: Khaled Mahmud	Rangpur Riders Coach: Sohel Islam	Sylhet Strikers Coach: Rajin Saleh
(Bangladesh) Ziaur Rahman (c); (Bangladesh) Shuvagata Hom; (Bangladesh) Afif Hossain; (Sri Lanka) Ashan Priyanjan; (Ireland) Curtis Campher; (Bangladesh) Mrittunjoy Chowdhury; (Sri Lanka) Vishwa Fernando; (Bangladesh) Mehedi Hasan Rana; (Bangladesh) Irfan Shukkur; (Bangladesh) Mehedi Maruf; (Netherlands) Max O'Dowd; (United States) Unmukt Chand; (Bangladesh) Taijul Islam; (Bangladesh) Abu Jayed; (Bangladesh) Farhad Reza; (Bangladesh) Tawfique Khan Tushar; (Bangladesh) Nihaduzzaman; (Pakistan) Usman Khan; (Pakistan) Shahnawaz Dahani; (Bangladesh) Al Amin Jr.; (Afghanistan) Darwish Rasooli; (Sri Lanka) Vijayakanth Viyaskanth; (Sri Lanka) Malinda Pushpakumara; (Pakistan) Khawaja Nafay; Avishek Mitra	(Bangladesh) Imrul Kayes (c); (Bangladesh) Liton Das; (Pakistan) Muhammad Rizwan; (Bangladesh) Mustafizur Rahman; (Pakistan) Hasan Ali; (Cricket West Indies) Brandon King; (Pakistan) Khushdil Shah; (Pakistan) Abrar Ahmed; (England) Josh Cobb; (Afghanistan) Mohammad Nabi; (Bangladesh) Mosaddek Hossain; (Bangladesh) Tanvir Islam; (Pakistan) Shaheen Shah Afridi; (Bangladesh) Ashiqur Zaman; (Bangladesh) Jaker Ali; (Zimbabwe) Sean Williams; (Cricket West Indies) Chadwick Walton; (Bangladesh) Saikat Ali; (Bangladesh) Abu Haider; (Bangladesh) Nayeem Hasan; (Bangladesh) Mukidul Islam; (Bangladesh) Mahidul Islam; (Pakistan) Aamer Jamal; (Afghanistan) Fazalhaq Farooqi; (England) Dawid Malan; (Cricket West Indies) Johnson Charles; (Pakistan) Naseem Shah; (Cricket West Indies) Sunil Narine; (Cricket West Indies) Andre Russell; (England) Moeen Ali	(Bangladesh) Taskin Ahmed; (Sri Lanka) Chamika Karunaratne; (Sri Lanka) Dilshan Munaweera; (Bangladesh) Mohammad Mithun; (Bangladesh) Soumya Sarkar; (Bangladesh) Shoriful Islam; (Bangladesh) Arafat Sunny; (Bangladesh) Nasir Hossain (c); (Bangladesh) Al Amin Hossain; (Pakistan) Shan Masood; (Pakistan) Ahmed Shehzad; (Bangladesh) Alok Kapali; Monir Hossain; (Bangladesh) Ariful Haque; (Bangladesh) Muktar Ali; Mizanur Rahman; Delwar Hossain; (Afghanistan) Usman Ghani; (Pakistan) Salman Irshad; (Bangladesh) Jubair Hossain; (Bangladesh) Mohor Sheikh; Abdullah Al Mamun; Imran Randhawa; Amir Hamza; (England) Robin Das; (Cricket West Indies) Devon Thomas; (England) Alex Blake	(Bangladesh) Shakib Al Hasan (c); (Bangladesh) Mahmudullah Riyad; (Bangladesh) Mehidy Hasan; (Afghanistan) Ibrahim Zadran; (Afghanistan) Karim Janat; (Pakistan) Iftikhar Ahmed; (Pakistan) Mohammad Wasim; (Sri Lanka) Kusal Perera; (Pakistan) Usman Qadir; (Cricket West Indies) Rakheem Cornwall; (Bangladesh) Ebadot Hossain; (Bangladesh) Anamul Haque; (Bangladesh) Kamrul Islam Rabbi; (Bangladesh) Fazle Mahmud; (Pakistan) Haider Ali; (Sri Lanka) Chaturanga de Silva; (Bangladesh) Khaled Ahmed; (Bangladesh) Saif Hasan; (Bangladesh) Qazi Anik; (Bangladesh) Sunzamul Islam; (Bangladesh) Salman Hossain; (South Africa) Dwaine Pretorius; (England) Reece Topley; (Sri Lanka) Bhanuka Rajapaksa	(Bangladesh) Tamim Iqbal; (Sri Lanka) Avishka Fernando; (Pakistan) Wahab Riaz; (Cricket West Indies) Shai Hope (c); (Pakistan) Azam Khan; (Bangladesh) Mohammad Saifuddin; (Bangladesh) Yasir Ali; (Bangladesh) Nasum Ahmed; (Bangladesh) Nahidul Islam; (Bangladesh) Munim Shahriar; (Bangladesh) Sabbir Rahman; (Netherlands) Paul van Meekeren; (Bangladesh) Shafiqul Islam; (Bangladesh) Pritom Kumar; (Bangladesh) Habibur Rahman Sohan; (Bangladesh) Mahmudul Hasan Joy; (Ireland) Andy Balbirnie; (Pakistan) Fakhar Zaman; (Pakistan) Sharjeel Khan; Amad Butt; (Bangladesh) Nahid Rana; (Bangladesh) Mushfiq Hasan; (Cricket West Indies) Mark Deyal; (Bangladesh) Hasan Murad	(Bangladesh) Nurul Hasan Sohan (c); (Pakistan) Shoaib Malik; (Sri Lanka) Pathum Nissanka; (Zimbabwe) Sikandar Raza; (Pakistan) Haris Rauf; (Pakistan) Mohammad Nawaz; (Sri Lanka) Jeffrey Vandersay; (Bangladesh) Sheikh Mahedi Hasan; (Bangladesh) Hasan Mahmud; (Bangladesh) Naim Sheikh; (Bangladesh) Rakibul Hasan Jr.; (Bangladesh) Shamim Hossain Patwary; (Bangladesh) Ripon Mondol; (Afghanistan) Azmatullah Omarzai; (United States) Aaron Jones; (Bangladesh) Rony Talukdar; (Bangladesh) Parvez Hossain Emon; (Bangladesh) Alauddin Babu; Rabiul Haque; (England) Benny Howell; (Pakistan) Saim Ayub; (Afghanistan) Mujeeb ur Rahman; (England) Tom Kohler-Cadmore; (Afghanistan) Rahmanullah Gurbaz; (Afghanistan) Naveen-ul-Haq; (Sri Lanka) Dasun Shanaka; (Cricket West Indies) Nicholas Pooran; (England) Sam Billings; (Cricket West Indies) Dwayne Bravo	(Bangladesh) Mashrafe Mortaza (c); (Bangladesh) Mushfiqur Rahim; (Pakistan) Mohammad Amir; (Sri Lanka) Dhananjaya de Silva; (Sri Lanka) Kamindu Mendis; (Netherlands) Colin Ackermann; (Zimbabwe) Ryan Burl; (Pakistan) Mohammad Haris; (Sri Lanka) Thisara Perera; (Bangladesh) Najmul Hossain Shanto; (Bangladesh) Rejaur Rahman Raja; (Bangladesh) Nabil Samad; (Bangladesh) Tawhid Hridoy; (Bangladesh) Rubel Hossain; (England) Tom Moores; (Afghanistan) Gulbadin Naib; (Bangladesh) Zakir Hasan; Nazmul Islam; (Bangladesh) Akbar Ali; Sharifullah; (Bangladesh) Tanzim Hasan Sakib; (Bangladesh) Shamsur Rahman; Shafiqullah Ghafari; (Pakistan) Imad Wasim; (Pakistan) Mohammad Irfan; (South Africa) George Linde; (Sri Lanka) Isuru Udana; (England) Luke Wood

== Venues ==
Chittagong	Dhaka	Sylhet
Zohur Ahmed Chowdhury Stadium	Sher-e-Bangla National Cricket Stadium	Sylhet International Cricket Stadium
Capacity: 20,000	Capacity: 26,000	Capacity: 18,500
Matches:12	Matches:26	Matches:8
2022–23 Bangladesh Premier League is located in Bangladesh

== Teams and standings ==
=== Points Table ===
Pos	Team	Pld	W	L	T	NR	Pts	NRR
1	Sylhet Strikers (RU)	12	9	3	0	0	18	0.737
2	Comilla Victorians (C)	12	9	3	0	0	18	0.723
3	Rangpur Riders	12	8	4	0	0	16	0.165
4	Fortune Barishal	12	7	5	0	0	14	0.542
5	Khulna Tigers	12	3	9	0	0	6	−0.534
6	Dhaka Dominators	12	3	9	0	0	6	−0.776
7	Chattogram Challengers	12	3	9	0	0	6	−0.872

Source: ESPN Cricinfo
- Advanced to Qualifier 1
- Advanced to the Eliminator

== League stage ==
=== Phase 1 (Dhaka) ===
Match 1
6 January 2022
14:00 (D/N)
Scorecard

Chattogram Challengers; 89/9 (20 overs)	v	Sylhet Strikers; 90/2 (12.3 overs)
Afif Hossain 25 (23); Rejaur Rahman Raja 4/14 (4 overs)		Nazmul Hossain Shanto 43* (41); Mrittunjoy Chowdhury 1/11 (3.3 overs)

Sylhet Strikers won by 8 wickets
Sher-e-Bangla National Cricket Stadium, Dhaka
Umpires: Mahfuzur Rahman (Ban) and Gazi Sohel (Ban)
Player of the match: Rejaur Rahman Raja (Sylhet Strikers)

- Sylhet Strikers won the toss and elected to field.

Match 2
6 January 2022
19:00 (N)
Scorecard

Rangpur Riders; 176/5 (20 overs)	v	Comilla Victorians; 142 (19.1 overs)
Rony Talukdar 67 (31); Mosaddek Hossain 1/13 (2 overs)		Imrul Kayes 35 (23); Hasan Mahmud 3/20 (3.1 overs)

Rangpur Riders won by 34 runs
Sher-e-Bangla National Cricket Stadium, Dhaka
Umpires: Tanvir Ahmed (Ban) and Morshed Ali Khan (Ban)
Player of the match: Rony Talukdar (Rangpur Riders)

- Comilla Victorians won the toss and elected to field.
- Ashiqur Zaman (Comilla Victorians) made his T20 debut.
- Rony Talukdar scored the fastest half-century by a Bangladeshi batter in the Bangladesh Premier League.

Match 3
7 January 2022
14:00 (D/N)
Scorecard

Khulna Tigers; 113/8 (20 overs)	v	Dhaka Dominators; 117/4 (19.1 overs)
Yasir Ali 24 (25); Al-Amin Hossain 4/28 (4 overs)		Nasir Hossain 36* (36); Mohammad Saifuddin 2/22 (4 overs)

Dhaka Dominators won by 6 wickets
Sher-e-Bangla National Cricket Stadium, Dhaka
Umpires: Morshed Ali Khan (Ban) and Gazi Sohel (Ban)
Player of the match: Nasir Hossain (Dhaka Dominators)

- Dhaka Dominators won the toss and elected to field.

Match 4
7 January 2022
18:30 (N)
Scorecard

Fortune Barishal; 194/7 (20 overs)	v	Sylhet Strikers; 196/4 (19 overs)
Shakib Al Hasan 67 (32); Mashrafe Mortaza 3/48 (4 overs)		Towhid Hridoy 55 (34); Chaturanga de Silva 1/14 (2 overs)

Sylhet Strikers won by 6 wickets
Sher-e-Bangla National Cricket Stadium, Dhaka
Umpires: Tanvir Ahmed (Ban) and Mahfuzur Rahman (Ban)
Player of the match: Towhid Hridoy (Sylhet Strikers)

- Fortune Barishal won the toss and elected to bat.

Match 5
9 January 2022
13:30 (D/N)
Scorecard

Comilla Victorians; 149/6 (20 overs)	v	Sylhet Strikers; 150/5 (17.4 overs)
Jaker Ali 57* (43); Mohammad Amir 2/22 (4 overs)		Towhid Hridoy 56 (37); Mohammad Nabi 2/28 (4 overs)

Sylhet Strikers won by 5 wickets
Sher-e-Bangla National Cricket Stadium, Dhaka
Umpires: David Millns (Eng) and Masudur Rahman (Ban)
Player of the match: Towhid Hridoy (Sylhet Strikers)

- Sylhet Strikers won the toss and elected to field.

Match 6
9 January 2022
18:30 (N)
Scorecard

Khulna Tigers; 178/5 (20 overs)	v	Chattogram Challengers; 179/1 (19.2 overs)
Azam Khan 109* (58); Abu Jayed 2/29 (4 overs)		Usman Khan 103* (58); Nahidul Islam 1/26 (3 overs)

Chattogram Challengers won by 9 wickets
Sher-e-Bangla National Cricket Stadium, Dhaka
Umpires: Tanvir Ahmed (Ban) and Raveendra Wimalasiri (SL)
Player of the match: Usman Khan (Chattogram Challengers)

- Chattogram Challengers won the toss and elected to field.
- Habibur Rahman Sohan (Khulna Tigers) made his T20 debut.
- Azam Khan and Usman Khan both scored their maiden centuries in T20 cricket.

Match 7
10 January 2022
13:30 (D/N)
Scorecard

Rangpur Riders; 158/7 (20 overs)	v	Fortune Barishal; 162/4 (19.2 overs)
Shoaib Malik 54* (36); Mehidy Hasan 2/21 (4 overs)		Ibrahim Zadran 52 (41); Sikandar Raza 2/14 (2 overs)

Fortune Barishal won by 6 wickets
Sher-e-Bangla National Cricket Stadium, Dhaka
Umpires: Gazi Sohel (Ban) and Raveendra Wimalasiri (SL)
Player of the match: Mehidy Hasan (Fortune Barishal)

- Fortune Barishal won the toss and elected to field.

Match 8
10 January 2022
18:30 (N)
Scorecard

Sylhet Strikers; 201/8 (20 overs)	v	Dhaka Dominators; 139 (19.3 overs)
Towhid Hridoy 84 (46); Al-Amin Hossain 3/45 (4 overs)		Nasir Hossain 44 (35); Mashrafe Mortaza 2/14 (3 overs)

Sylhet Strikers won by 62 runs
Sher-e-Bangla National Cricket Stadium, Dhaka
Umpires: David Millns (Eng) and Masudur Rahman (Ban)
Player of the match: Towhid Hridoy (Sylhet Strikers)

- Dhaka Dominators won the toss and elected to field.

=== Phase 2 (Chittagong) ===
Match 9
13 January 2023
14:00 (D/N)
Scorecard

Fortune Barishal; 202/7 (20 overs)	v	Chattogram Challengers; 176/4 (20 overs)
Iftikhar Ahmed 57* (26); Abu Jayed 3/49 (4 overs)		Ziaur Rahman 47* (25); Kamrul Islam 1/8 (1 over)

Fortune Barishal won by 26 runs
Zohur Ahmed Chowdhury Stadium, Chittagong
Umpires: Ali Arman (Ban) and Raveendra Wimalasiri (SL)
Player of the match: Iftikhar Ahmed (Fortune Barishal)

- Chattogram Challengers won the toss and elected to field.

Match 10
13 January 2022
19:00 (N)
Scorecard

Khulna Tigers; 130 (19.4 overs)	v	Rangpur Riders; 131/6 (19.3 overs)
Azam Khan 34 (23); Robiul Haque 4/22 (4 overs)		Shoaib Malik 44 (36); Nasum Ahmed 2/21 (4 overs)

Rangpur Riders won by 4 wickets
Zohur Ahmed Chowdhury Stadium, Chittagong
Umpires: Tanvir Ahmed (Ban) and Prageeth Rambukwella (SL)
Player of the match: Robiul Haque (Rangpur Riders)

- Rangpur Riders won the toss and elected field.

Match 11
14 January 2023
13:30 (D/N)
Scorecard

Fortune Barishal; 177/6 (20 overs)	v	Comilla Victorians; 165/7 (20 overs)
Shakib Al Hasan 81* (45); Tanvir Islam 4/33 (4 overs)		Khushdil Shah 43* (27); Shakib Al Hasan 1/11 (3 overs)

Fortune Barishal won by 12 runs.
Zohur Ahmed Chowdhury Stadium, Chittagong
Umpires: Morshed Ali Khan (Ban) and David Millns (Eng)
Player of the match: Shakib Al Hasan (Fortune Barishal)

- Comilla Victorians won the toss and elected to field.

Match 12
14 January 2023
18:30 (N)
Scorecard

Dhaka Dominators; 158/6 (20 overs)	v	Chattogram Challengers; 159/2 (17.4 overs)
Usman Ghani 47 (33); Nihaduzzaman 2/23 (3 overs)		Afif Hossain 69* (52); Arafat Sunny 1/21 (4 overs)

Chattogram Challengers won by 8 wickets.
Zohur Ahmed Chowdhury Stadium, Chittagong
Umpires: Ali Arman (Ban) and Prageeth Rambukwella (SL)
Player of the match: Afif Hossain (Chattogram Challengers)

- Dhaka Dominators won the toss and elected to bat.

Match 13
16 January 2023
13:30 (D/N)
Scorecard

Dhaka Dominators; 128/7 (20 overs)	v	Sylhet Strikers; 134/5 (19.2 overs)
Nasir Hossain 39 (31); Imad Wasim 3/20 (4 overs)		Mohammad Haris 44 (32); Nasir Hossain 2/19 (4 overs)

Sylhet Strikers won by 5 wickets
Zohur Ahmed Chowdhury Stadium, Chittagong
Umpires: Morshed Ali Khan (Ban) and David Millns (Eng)
Player of the match: Imad Wasim (Sylhet Strikers)

- Dhaka Dominators won the toss and elected to bat.

Match 14
16 January 2023
18:30 (N)
Scorecard

Chattogram Challengers; 135/8 (20 overs)	v	Comilla Victorians; 137/4 (17.3 overs)
Shuvagata Hom 37* (23); Khushdil Shah 2/20 (4 overs)		Litton Das 40 (22); Malinda Pushpakumara 2/33 (3 overs)

Comilla Victorians won by 6 wickets
Zohur Ahmed Chowdhury Stadium, Chittagong
Umpires: Ali Arman (Ban) and Raveendra Wimalasiri (SL)
Player of the match: Litton Das (Comilla Victorians)

- Chattogram Challengers won the toss and elected to bat.

Match 15
17 January 2023
13:30 (D/N)
Scorecard

Rangpur Riders; 129 (20 overs)	v	Khulna Tigers; 130/1 (18.2 overs)
Mahedi Hasan 38 (34); Wahab Riaz 4/14 (4 overs)		Tamim Iqbal 60* (47); Azmatullah Omarzai 1/26 (3.2 overs)

Khulna Tigers won by 9 wickets
Zohur Ahmed Chowdhury Stadium, Chittagong
Umpires: Ali Arman (Ban) and David Millns (Eng)
Player of the match: Wahab Riaz (Khulna Tigers)

- Khulna Tigers won the toss and elected to field.

Match 16
17 January 2023
18:30 (N)
Scorecard

Sylhet Strikers; 133/7 (20 overs)	v	Comilla Victorians; 134/5 (19 overs)
Thisara Perera 43* (31); Mukidul Islam 2/28 (4 overs)		Litton Das 70 (42); Mashrafe Mortaza 2/19 (4 overs)

Comilla Victorians won by 5 wickets
Zohur Ahmed Chowdhury Stadium, Chittagong
Umpires: Tanvir Ahmed (Ban) and Prageeth Rambukwella (SL)
Player of the match: Litton Das (Comilla Victorians)

- Comilla Victorians won the toss and elected to field.

Match 17
19 January 2023
13:30 (D/N)
Scorecard

Comilla Victorians; 184/4 (20 overs)	v	Dhaka Dominators; 151/4 (20 overs)
Khushdil Shah 64 (24); Soumya Sarkar 1/8 (1 over)		Nasir Hossain 66* (45); Tanvir Islam 1/12 (4 overs)

Comilla Victorians won by 33 runs
Zohur Ahmed Chowdhury Stadium, Chittagong
Umpires: Mahfuzur Rahman (Ban) and Raveendra Wimalasiri (SL)
Player of the match: Khushdil Shah (Comilla Victorians)

- Dhaka Dominators won the toss and elected to field.

Match 18
19 January 2023
18:30 (N)
Scorecard

Fortune Barishal; 238/4 (20 overs)	v	Rangpur Riders; 171/9 (20 overs)
Iftikhar Ahmed 100* (45); Hasan Mahmud 2/31 (4 overs)		Shamim Hossain 44* (24); Mehidy Hasan 3/26 (4 overs)

Fortune Barishal won by 67 runs
Zohur Ahmed Chowdhury Stadium, Chittagong
Umpires: Masudur Rahman (Ban) and Prageeth Rambukwella (SL)
Player of the match: Iftikhar Ahmed (Fortune Barishal)

- Rangpur Riders won the toss and elected to field.
- Iftikhar Ahmed (Fortune Barishal) scored his first century in T20 cricket.
- 192-run stand between Shakib Al Hasan and Iftikhar Ahmed (Fortune Barishal) is the highest fifth wicket partnership in T20 cricket.

Match 19
20 January 2023
14:00 (D/N)
Scorecard

Chattogram Challengers; 157/9 (20 overs)	v	Khulna Tigers; 159/3 (19.2 overs)
Usman Khan 45 (31); Wahab Riaz 4/36 (4 overs)		Mahmudul Hasan Joy 59 (44); Nihaduzzaman 2/32 (3.2 overs)

Khulna Tigers won by 7 wickets
Zohur Ahmed Chowdhury Stadium, Chittagong
Umpires: Mahfuzur Rahman (Ban) and Raveendra Wimalasiri (SL)
Player of the match: Mahmudul Hasan Joy (Khulna Tigers)

- Khulna Tigers won the toss and elected to field.
- Khawaja Nafay (Chattogram Challengers) made his T20 debut.

Match 20
20 January 2023
19:00 (N)
Scorecard

Fortune Barishal; 173/5 (20 overs)	v	Dhaka Dominators; 160/4 (20 overs)
Iftikhar Ahmed 56* (34); Nasir Hossain 2/16 (2 overs)		Nasir Hossain 54* (36); Chaturanga de Silva 1/22 (4 overs)

Fortune Barishal won by 13 runs.
Zohur Ahmed Chowdhury Stadium, Chittagong
Umpires: David Millns (Eng) and Masudur Rahman (Ban)
Player of the match: Iftikhar Ahmed (Fortune Barishal)

- Dhaka Dominators won the toss and elected to field.

=== Phase 3 (Dhaka) ===
Match 21
23 January 2023
13:30 (D/N)
Scorecard

Rangpur Riders; 179/6 (20 overs)	v	Chattogram Challengers; 124 (16.3 overs)
Shoaib Malik 75 (45); Mehedi Hasan Rana 3/39 (4 overs)		Shuvagata Hom 52 (31); Haris Rauf 3/17 (3.3 overs)

Rangpur Riders won by 55 runs
Sher-e-Bangla National Cricket Stadium, Mirpur
Umpires: Muhammad Kamruzzaman (Ban) and Prageeth Rambukwella (SL)
Player of the match: Shoaib Malik (Rangpur Riders)

- Chattogram Challengers won the toss and elected to field.

Match 22
23 January 2023
18:30 (N)
Scorecard

Comilla Victorians; 164/6 (20 overs)	v	Dhaka Dominators; 104/9 (20 overs)
Johnson Charles 32 (25); Nasir Hossain 3/19 (3 overs)		Usman Ghani 33 (34); Naseem Shah 4/12 (4 overs)

Comilla Victorians won by 60 runs
Sher-e-Bangla National Cricket Stadium, Mirpur
Umpires: Masudur Rahman (Ban) and Raveendra Wimalasiri (SL)
Player of the match: Khushdil Shah (Comilla Victorians)

- Dhaka Dominators won the toss and elected to field.

Match 23
24 January 2023
13:30 (D/N)
Scorecard

Sylhet Strikers; 173/5 (20 overs)	v	Fortune Barishal; 171/8 (20 overs)
Najmul Hossain Shanto 89* (66); Mohammad Wasim 3/34 (4 overs)		Ibrahim Zadran 42 (37); Rejaur Rahman Raja 3/41 (4 overs)

Sylhet Strikers won by 2 runs
Sher-e-Bangla National Cricket Stadium, Mirpur
Umpires: David Millns (Eng) and Masudur Rahman (Ban)
Player of the match: Nazmul Hossain Shanto (Sylhet Strikers)

- Fortune Barishal won the toss and elected to field.

Match 24
24 January 2023
18:30 (N)
Scorecard

Dhaka Dominators; 108 (19.4 overs)	v	Khulna Tigers; 84 (15.3 overs)
Soumya Sarkar 57 (45); Nahidul Islam 4/6 (4 overs)		Tamim Iqbal 30 (23); Taskin Ahmed 4/9 (4 overs)

Dhaka Dominators won by 24 runs
Sher-e-Bangla National Cricket Stadium, Mirpur
Umpires: Muhammad Kamruzzaman (Ban) and Raveendra Wimalasiri (SL)
Player of the match: Taskin Ahmed (Dhaka Dominators)

- Khulna Tigers won the toss and elected to field.
- Nahid Rana (Khulna Tigers) made his T20 debut.

=== Phase 4 (Sylhet) ===
Match 25
27 January 2023
14:00
Scorecard

Sylhet Strikers; 92/9 (20 overs)	v	Rangpur Riders; 93/4 (15.4 overs)
Tanzim Hasan Sakib 41 (36); Hasan Mahmud 3/12 (4 overs)		Rony Talukdar 41* (38); Mashrafe Mortaza 2/18 (3 overs)

Rangpur Riders won by 6 wickets.
Sylhet International Cricket Stadium, Sylhet
Umpires: Gazi Sohel (Ban) and Prageeth Rambukwella (SL)
Player of the match: Azmatullah Omarzai (Rangpur Riders)

- Rangpur Riders won the toss and elected to field.

Match 26
27 January 2023
19:00 (N)
Scorecard

Chattogram Challengers; 168/6 (20 overs)	v	Fortune Barishal; 171/7 (19.2 overs)
Curtis Campher 45* (25); Khaled Ahmed 2/26 (4 overs)		Anamul Haque 78 (50); Nihaduzzaman 4/17 (4 overs)

Fortune Barishal won by 3 wickets.
Sylhet International Cricket Stadium, Sylhet
Umpires: David Millns (Eng) and Mahfuzur Rahman (Ban)
Player of the match: Anamul Haque (Fortune Barishal)

- Fortune Barishal won the toss and elected to field.

Match 27
28 January 2023
13:30 (D/N)
Scorecard

Comilla Victorians; 165/2 (20 overs)	v	Khulna Tigers; 161/6 (20 overs)
Mohammed Rizwan 54* (47); Nahidul Islam 1/34 (4 overs)		Andrew Balbirnie 38 (31); Naseem Shah 2/29 (4 overs)

Comilla Victorians won by 4 runs.
Sylhet International Cricket Stadium, Sylhet
Umpires: Raveendra Wimalasiri (SL) and Mahfuzur Rahman (Ban)
Player of the match: Mohammed Rizwan (Comilla Victorians)

- Khulna Tigers won the toss and elected to field.

Match 28
28 January 2023
18:30 (N)
Scorecard

Chattogram Challengers; 174/6 (20 overs)	v	Sylhet Strikers; 177/3 (18 overs)
Shuvagata Hom 54* (29); Imad Wasim 2/23 (4 overs)		Najmul Hossain Shanto 60 (44); Vijayakanth Viyaskanth 2/27 (4 overs)

Sylhet Strikers won by 7 wickets.
Sylhet International Cricket Stadium, Sylhet
Umpires: Tanvir Ahmed (Ban) and David Millns (Eng)
Player of the match: Nazmul Hossain Shanto (Sylhet Strikers)

- Chattogram Challengers won the toss and elected to bat.

Match 29
30 January 2023
13:30 (D/N)
Scorecard

Dhaka Dominators; 144/5 (20 overs)	v	Rangpur Riders; 146/5 (19 overs)
Usman Ghani 73* (55); Azmatullah Omarzai 2/27 (4 overs)		Mahedi Hasan 72 (43); Salman Irshad 2/36 (4 overs)

Rangpur Riders won by 5 wickets.
Sylhet International Cricket Stadium, Sylhet
Umpires: Ali Arman (Ban) and Prageeth Rambukwella (SL)
Player of the match: Mahedi Hasan (Rangpur Riders)

- Rangpur Riders won the toss and elected to field.

Match 30
30 January 2023
19:00 (N)
Scorecard

Sylhet Strikers; 192/4 (20 overs)	v	Khulna Tigers; 161/9 (20 overs)
Towhid Hridoy 74 (49); Mark Deyal 2/40 (4 overs)		Azam Khan 33 (17); Rubel Hossain 4/37 (4 overs)

Sylhet Strikers won by 31 runs.
Sylhet International Cricket Stadium, Sylhet
Umpires: Morshed Ali Khan (Ban) and Raveendra Wimalasiri (SL)
Player of the match: Towhid Hridoy (Sylhet Strikers)

- Khulna Tigers won the toss and elected to field.

Match 31
31 January 2023
13:30 (D/N)
Scorecard

Fortune Barishal; 156/8 (20 overs)	v	Dhaka Dominators; 157/5 (18.5 overs)
Anamul Haque 42 (35); Amir Hamza 2/22 (4 overs)		Mohammad Mithun 54 (36); Shakib Al Hasan 2/18 (4 overs)

Dhaka Dominators won by 5 wickets
Sylhet International Cricket Stadium, Sylhet
Umpires: Mozahiduzzaman (Ban) and Prageeth Rambukwella (SL)
Player of the match: Mohammad Mithun (Dhaka Dominators)

- Fortune Barishal won the toss and elected to bat.
- Abdullah Al Mamun (Dhaka Dominators) made his T20 debut.

Match 32
31 January 2023
19:00 (N)
Scorecard

Khulna Tigers; 210/2 (20 overs)	v	Comilla Victorians; 213/3 (18.2 overs)
Tamim Iqbal 95 (61); Naseem Shah 1/34 (4 overs)		Johnson Charles 107* (56); Nasum Ahmed 1/19 (4 overs)

Comilla Victorians won by 7 wickets.
Sylhet International Cricket Stadium, Sylhet
Umpires: David Millns (Eng) and Raveendra Wimalasiri (SL)
Player of the match: Johnson Charles (Comilla Victorians)

- Comilla Victorians won the toss and elected to field.
- This is the highest successful run chase in BPL.

=== Phase 5 (Dhaka) ===
Match 33
3 February 2023
14:00 (D/N)
Scorecard

Fortune Barishal; 194/5 (20 overs)	v	Khulna Tigers; 157/8 (20 overs)
Iftikhar Ahmed 51* (31); Paul van Meekeren 3/48 (4 overs)		Yasir Ali 60 (38); Karim Janat 4/29 (4 overs)

Fortune Barishal won by 37 runs
Sher-e-Bangla National Cricket Stadium, Mirpur
Umpires: David Millns (Eng) and Masudur Rahman (Ban)
Player of the match: Shakib Al Hasan (Fortune Barishal)

- Khulna Tigers won the toss and elected to field.

Match 34
3 February 2022
19:00 (N)
Scorecard

Dhaka Dominators; 130/8 (20 overs)	v	Rangpur Riders; 133/8 (19.3 overs)
Ariful Haque 29 (26); Azmatullah Omarzai 2/22 (4 overs)		Nurul Hasan 61 (33); Nasir Hossain 4/20 (4 overs)

Rangpur Riders won by 2 wickets
Sher-e-Bangla National Cricket Stadium, Mirpur
Umpires: Prageeth Rambukwella (SL) and Gazi Sohel (Ban)
Player of the match: Nurul Hasan (Rangpur Riders)

- Rangpur Riders won the toss and elected to field.
- Shoaib Malik (Rangpur Riders) become the third cricketer to play 500 matches in T20 cricket.

Match 35
4 February 2023
13:30 (D/N)
Scorecard

Chattogram Challengers; 156/7 (20 overs)	v	Comilla Victorians; 157/4 (19 overs)
Afif Hossain 66 (49); Hasan Ali 2/25 (4 overs)		Muhammad Rizwan 61 (47); Ziaur Rahman 2/27 (4 overs)

Comilla Victorians won by 6 wickets.
Sher-e-Bangla National Cricket Stadium, Mirpur
Umpires: Gazi Sohel (Ban) and Raveendra Wimalasiri (SL)
Player of the match: Mohammed Rizwan (Comilla Victorians)

- Chattogram Challengers won the toss and elected to bat.

Match 36
4 February 2023
19:00 (N)
Scorecard

Sylhet Strikers; 170/2 (20 overs)	v	Rangpur Riders; 176/2 (18 overs)
Towhid Hridoy 85* (57); Mahedi Hasan 1/20 (3 overs)		Rony Talukdar 66 (35); Rejaur Rahman Raja 1/35 (4 overs)

Rangpur Riders won by 8 wickets.
Sher-e-Bangla National Cricket Stadium, Mirpur
Umpires: Masudur Rahman (Ban) and Prageeth Rambukwella (SL)
Player of the match: Rony Talukdar (Rangpur Riders)

- Rangpur Riders won the toss and elected to field.

Match 37
7 February 2023
13:30 (D/N)
Scorecard

Chattogram Challengers; 118/8 (20 overs)	v	Dhaka Dominators; 103/9 (20 overs)
Ziaur Rahman 34* (20); Arafat Sunny 4/22 (4 overs)		Nasir Hossain 24 (33); Curtis Campher 3/15 (4 overs)

Chattogram Challengers won by 15 runs
Sher-e-Bangla National Cricket Stadium, Mirpur
Umpires: David Millns (Eng) and Mozahiduzzaman (Ban)
Player of the match: Ziaur Rahman (Chattogram Challengers)

- Chattogram Challengers won the toss and elected to bat.

Match 38
7 February 2023
19:00 (N)
Scorecard

Fortune Barishal; 121 (19.1 overs)	v	Comilla Victorians; 122/5 (18.3 overs)
Mahmudullah 36 (26); Mukidul Islam 5/23 (3.1 overs)		Litton Das 36 (39); Ebadot Hossain 2/18 (4 overs)

Comilla Victorians won by 5 wickets
Sher-e-Bangla National Cricket Stadium, Mirpur
Umpires: Mahfuzur Rahman (Ban) and Raveendra Wimalasiri (SL)
Player of the match: Mukidul Islam (Comilla Victorians)

- Comilla Victorians won the toss and elected to field.

Match 39
8 February 2023
13:30 (D/N)
Scorecard

Khulna Tigers; 113/8 (20 overs)	v	Sylhet Strikers; 114/4 (17.3 overs)
Mahmudul Hasan Joy 41 (41); Tanzim Hasan Sakib 3/22 (4 overs)		Zakir Hasan 50 (46); Mohammad Saifuddin 1/13 (3 overs)

Sylhet Strikers won by 6 wickets.
Sher-e-Bangla National Cricket Stadium, Mirpur
Umpires: David Millns (Eng) and Mahfuzur Rahman (Ban)
Player of the match: Imad Wasim (Sylhet Strikers)

- Khulna Tigers won the toss and elected to bat.

Match 40
8 February 2023
18:30 (N)
Scorecard

Chattogram Challengers; 132/8 (20 overs)	v	Rangpur Riders; 135/3 (16 overs)
Ziaur Rahman 33 (25); Haris Rauf 2/14 (4 overs)		Rahmanullah Gurbaz 46 (30); Nihaduzzaman 2/24 (4 overs)

Rangpur Riders won by 7 wickets.
Sher-e-Bangla National Cricket Stadium, Mirpur
Umpires: Mozahiduzzaman (Ban) and Prageeth Rambukwella (SL)
Player of the match: Haris Rauf (Rangpur Riders)

- Chattogram Challengers won the toss and elected to bat.
- Ripon Mondol (Rangpur Riders) made his T20 debut.

Match 41
10 February 2023
14:00 (D/N)
Scorecard

Comilla Victorians; 177/5 (20 overs)	v	Rangpur Riders; 107 (17 overs)
Litton Das 47 (33); Azmatullah Omarzai 2/34 (4 overs)		Rahmanullah Gurbaz 29 (22); Mustafizur Rahman 3/18 (3 overs)

Comilla Victorians won by 70 runs
Sher-e-Bangla National Cricket Stadium, Mirpur
Umpires: Mahfuzur Rahman (Ban) and Prageeth Rambukwella (SL)
Player of the match: Tanvir Islam (Comilla Victorians)

- Rangpur Riders won the toss and elected to field.

Match 42
10 February 2023
19:00 (N)
Scorecard

Fortune Barishal; 169/8 (20 overs)	v	Khulna Tigers; 172/4 (19.3 overs)
Dwaine Pretorius 48 (29); Mohammad Saifuddin 4/20 (4 overs)		Mahmudul Hasan Joy 64* (43); Chaturanga de Silva 1/18 (4 overs)

Khulna Tigers won by 6 wickets
Sher-e-Bangla National Cricket Stadium, Mirpur
Umpires: Ali Arman (Ban) and Raveendra Wimalasiri (SL)
Player of the match: Mahmudul Hasan Joy (Khulna Tigers)

- Fortune Barishal won the toss and elected to bat.

== Playoffs ==
Qualifier 1 and Eliminator
12 February 2022 — Dhaka
1	Sylhet Strikers	125 (17.1 overs)
2	Comilla Victorians	130/6 (16.4 overs)
12 February 2022 — Dhaka
3	Rangpur Riders	172/6 (19.3 overs)
4	Fortune Barishal	170/3 (20 overs)

Qualifier 2
14 February 2022 — Dhaka
1	Sylhet Strikers	182/7 (20 overs)
3	Rangpur Riders	163/8 (20 overs)

Final
16 February 2022 — Dhaka
2	Comilla Victorians	176/3 (19.2 overs)
1	Sylhet Strikers	175/7 (20 overs)

=== Eliminator ===
Match 43
12 February 2022
14:00
Scorecard

Fortune Barishal; 170/3 (20 overs)	v	Rangpur Riders; 172/6 (19.3 overs)
Mehidy Hasan 69 (48); Dasun Shanaka 2/23 (3 overs)		Shamim Hossain 71 (51); Khaled Ahmed 2/23 (4 overs)

Rangpur Riders won by 4 wickets
Sher-e-Bangla National Cricket Stadium, Mirpur
Umpires: Ali Arman (Ban) and Prageeth Rambukwella (SL)
Player of the match: Shamim Hossain (Rangpur Riders)

- Rangpur Riders won the toss and elected to field.

=== Qualifiers ===
Qualifier 1

Match 44
12 February 2022
19:00 (D/N)
Scorecard

Sylhet Strikers; 125 (17.1 overs)	v	Comilla Victorians; 130/6 (16.4 overs)
Nazmul Hossain Shanto 38 (29); Andre Russell 2/22 (3 overs)		Sunil Narine 39 (18); Rubel Hossain 3/33 (3.4 overs)

Comilla Victorians won by 4 wickets
Sher-e-Bangla National Cricket Stadium, Mirpur
Umpires: David Millns (Eng) and Raveendra Wimalasiri (SL)
Player of the match: Tanvir Islam (Comilla Victorians)

- Comilla Victorians won the toss and elected to field.

Qualifier 2

Match 45
14 February 2022
19:00 (N)
Scorecard

Sylhet Strikers; 182/7 (20 overs)	v	Rangpur Riders; 163/8 (20 overs)
Najmul Hossain Shanto 40 (30); Hasan Mahmud 2/34 (4 overs)		Rony Talukdar 66 (52); Luke Wood 3/34 (4 overs)

Sylhet Strikers won by 19 runs
Sher-e-Bangla National Cricket Stadium, Mirpur
Umpires: Prageeth Rambukwella (SL) and Raveendra Wimalasiri (SL)
Player of the match: Tanzim Hasan Sakib (Sylhet Strikers)

- Rangpur Riders won the toss and elected to field.

=== Final ===
Match 46
16 February 2022
19:00 (N)
Scorecard

Sylhet Strikers; 175/7 (20 overs)	v	Comilla Victorians; 176/3 (19.2 overs)
Mushfiqur Rahim 74* (48); Mustafizur Rahman 2/31 (4 overs)		Johnson Charles 79* (52); Rubel Hossain 2/39 (4 overs)

Comilla Victorians won by 7 wickets
Sher-e-Bangla National Cricket Stadium, Mirpur
Umpires: Tanvir Ahmed (Ban) and David Millns (Eng)
Player of the match: Johnson Charles (Comilla Victorians)

- Comilla Victorians won the toss and elected to field.

== Statistics ==
As of 17 February 2023

=== Most runs ===
Player	Team	Matches	Runs	High score
Najmul Hossain Shanto	Sylhet Strikers	15	516	89*
Rony Talukdar	Rangpur Riders	13	425	67
Towhid Hridoy	Sylhet Strikers	13	403	85*
Litton Das	Comilla Victorians	13	379	70
Shakib Al Hasan	Fortune Barishal	13	375	89*

- Source: Cricinfo.com

=== Most wickets ===
Player	Team	Matches	Wickets	Best bowling
Tanvir Islam	Comilla Victorians	12	17	4/33
Hasan Mahmud	Rangpur Riders	14	17	3/12
Nasir Hossain	Dhaka Dominators	12	16	4/20
Azmatullah Omarzai	Rangpur Riders	11	15	3/17
Rubel Hossain	Sylhet Strikers	8	14	4/37

- Source: Cricinfo.com

=== Highest team totals ===
Team	Total	Opponent	Ground	Result
Fortune Barishal	238/4	Rangpur Riders	Zohur Ahmed Chowdhury Stadium	Fortune Barishal won
Comilla Victorians	213/3 (Note: These scores were made during the same match)	Khulna Tigers	Sylhet International Cricket Stadium	Comilla Victorians won
Khulna Tigers	210/2	Comilla Victorians	Sylhet International Cricket Stadium	Comilla Victorians won
Fortune Barishal	202/7	Chattogram Challengers	Zohur Ahmed Chowdhury Stadium	Fortune Barishal won
Sylhet Strikers	201/8	Dhaka Dominators	Sher-e-Bangla National Cricket Stadium	Sylhet Strikers won

- Source: Cricinfo.com

== Prizes and awards ==
The following prizes were given after the final match.

Category	Amount	Winner	Performance
Champion	৳2 crore (US$160,000)	Comilla Victorians	–
Runner-up	৳1 crore (US$81,000)	Sylhet Strikers	–
Player of the tournament	৳10 lakh (US$8,100)	Najmul Hossain Shanto (Sylhet Strikers)	516 runs; 1 wicket
Highest run-scorer	৳5 lakh (US$4,100)	Najmul Hossain Shanto (Sylhet Strikers)	516 runs
Most wickets	৳5 lakh (US$4,100)	Tanvir Islam (Comilla Victorians); Hasan Mahmud (Rangpur Riders)	17 wickets
Best fielder	৳3 lakh (US$2,400)	Mushfiqur Rahim (Sylhet Strikers)	11 catches, 1 stumping
Player of the final	৳5 lakh (US$4,100)	Johnson Charles (Comilla Victorians)	79 runs (52 balls)
