= Mahmudullah =

Bangladeshi cricketer (born 1986)

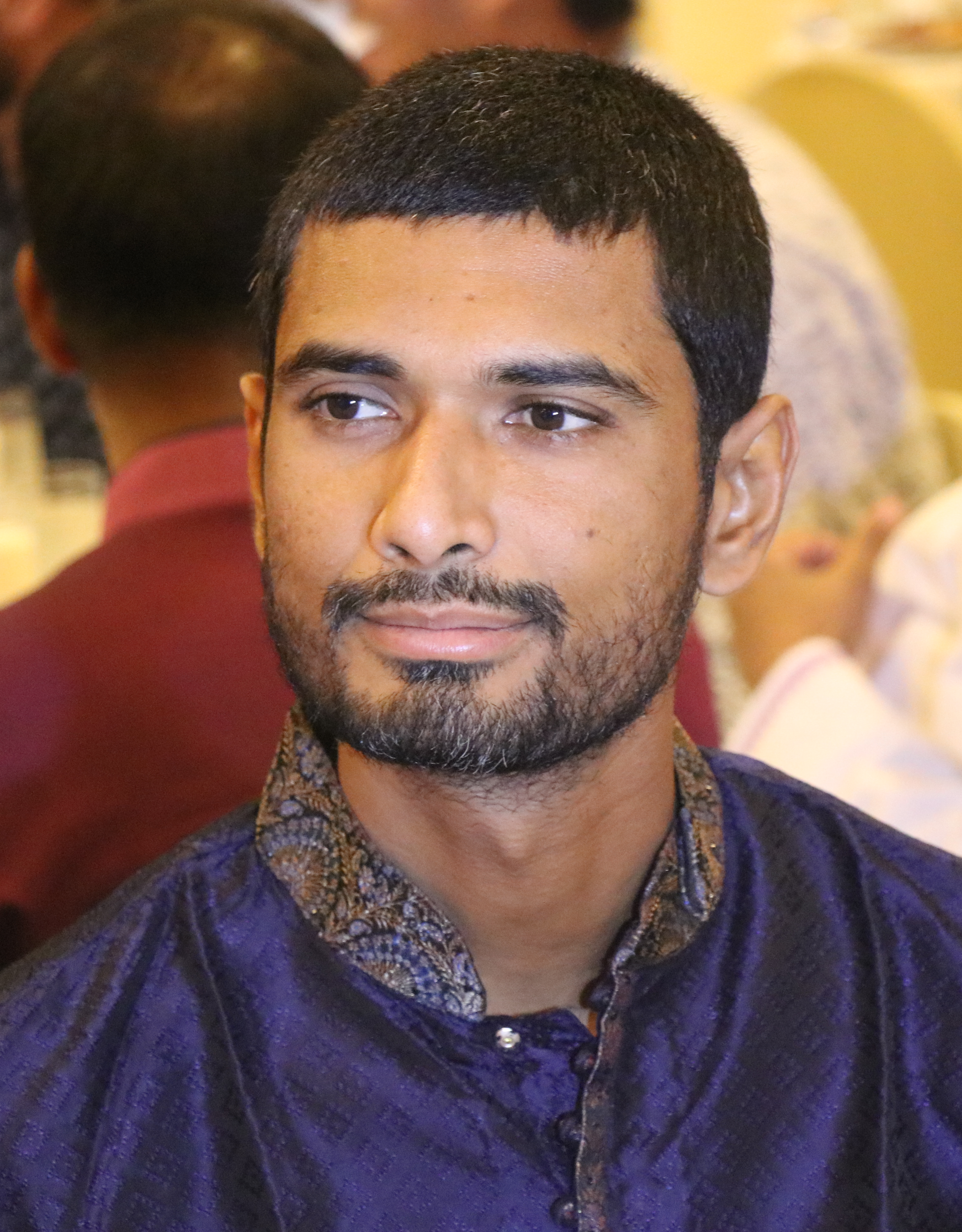
- Mahmudullah in 2018

Personal information
- Full name: Mohammad Mahmudullah
- Born: 4 February 1986 (age 40); Mymensingh, Bangladesh
- Nickname: Riyad, Silent Killer
- Height: 1.83 m (6 ft 0 in)
- Batting: Right-handed
- Bowling: Right-arm off break
- Role: Middle-order batter
- Relatives: Mushfiqur Rahim (brother-in-law)

International information
- National side: Bangladesh (2007–2025)
- Test debut (cap 55): 9 July 2009 v West Indies
- Last Test: 7 July 2021 v Zimbabwe
- ODI debut (cap 85): 28 July 2007 v Sri Lanka
- Last ODI: 24 February 2025 v New Zealand
- ODI shirt no.: 30
- T20I debut (cap 13): 1 September 2007 v Kenya
- Last T20I: 12 October 2024 v India
- T20I shirt no.: 30

Domestic team information
- Years: Team
- 2004/05–present: Dhaka Division
- 2012–2013: Chittagong Kings
- 2012: Basnahira Cricket Dundee
- 2015: Barisal Bulls
- 2016–2019: Khulna Titans
- 2019: Chattogram Challengers
- 2017–2018: Quetta Gladiators
- 2017: Jamaica Tallawahs
- 2018: St Kitts & Nevis Patriots
- 2022: Minister Dhaka
- 2023–2025: Fortune Barishal

Career statistics
Competition	Test	ODI	T20I	FC
Matches	50	239	141	114
Runs scored	2,914	5,689	2,444	6,557
Batting average	33.49	36.46	23.50	35.63
100s/50s	5/16	4/32	0/8	14/32
Top score	150*	128*	64*	152
Balls bowled	3,423	4,380	950	9,111
Wickets	43	82	41	143
Bowling average	45.53	46.45	27.68	35.14
5 wickets in innings	1	0	0	3
10 wickets in match	0	0	0	1
Best bowling	5/51	3/4	3/10	7/94
Catches/stumpings	38/1	82/–	51/–	98/1
Medal record
Men's Cricket
Representing Bangladesh
Asia Cup
Runner-up	2012 Bangladesh
Runner-up	2016 Bangladesh
Runner-up	2018 UAE
Asian Games
Bronze medal – third place	2014 Incheon	Team
- Source: ESPNcricinfo, 12 March 2025

Mohammad Mahmudullah (Bengali: মোহাম্মদ মাহমুদউল্লাহ রিয়াদ; born 4 February 1986), also known as Riyad, is a former Bangladeshi international cricketer who captained the national team. He plays for Dhaka Division and has represented the national team in all formats. An all-rounder, he is a lower or middle-order batter as well as an off spin bowler. He has scored more than 10,000 runs and taken 150+ wickets in international cricket. He is renowned for his ability to finish a close limited-over game. He is the first Bangladeshi to score a World Cup hundred. (Note: total 4 hundreds in ICC events, including back to back hundreds against England and New Zealand in the 2015 Cricket World Cup) Mahmudullah started his career as a bowler and then converted into a batsman who could bowl off-breaks.

== Domestic and T20 career ==
=== National Cricket League ===
In the 2008-2009 Bangladeshi domestic season Mahmudullah finished as the second-highest run-scorer in the competition with 710 runs at an average of 54.61 and was subsequently recalled to the ODI squad to face Zimbabwe in three ODIs and a tri-nation series with Sri Lanka and Zimbabwe.

=== Bangladesh Premier League ===
==== Chittagong Kings ====
The Bangladesh Cricket Board founded the six-team Bangladesh Premier League in 2012, a twenty20 tournament to be held in February that year. An auction was held for teams to buy players, and Mahmudullah was bought by the Chittagong Kings for $110,000. He scored 180 runs in 10 innings with 1 fifty, and took 4 wickets.

In the 2013 Bangladesh Premier League, he scored 233 runs in 12 innings, and took 6 wickets with a best figure of conceding only two runs while he took six wickets (2/6).

==== Barisal Bulls ====
In the 2015 Bangladesh Premier League, Mahmudullah top-scored for his team Barisal Bulls scoring 279 runs in 12 innings with 2 fifties. He also took 5 wickets with the ball.

==== Khulna Titans ====
Playing for his new team Khulna Titans in the 2016 Bangladesh Premier League, Mahmudullah top-scored for his team again scoring 396 runs in 14 innings with 2 fifties. With the ball, he took 10 wickets with the best figure being 3/6.

In the 2017 Bangladesh Premier League, Mahmudullah scored 312 runs in 12 innings with 2 half-centuries, and was yet again the top-scorer of his team. Besides, he took 6 wickets with the ball.

In the 2019 Bangladesh Premier League, he scored 219 runs in 12 innings with 1 fifty. He also took 9 wickets.

==== Chattogram Challengers ====
In November 2019, he was selected to play for the Chattogram Challengers in the 2019–20 Bangladesh Premier League. Mahmudullah scored 201 runs in 7 innings with 1 fifty. With the ball in hand, he took 3 wickets.

==== Minister Group Dhaka ====
In the 2021–22 Bangladesh Premier League, Mahmudullah scored 255 runs in 8 innings with 1 half-century playing for the Minister Group Dhaka. He also took 3 wickets with his best being 1/5.

==== Fortune Barishal ====
In the 2023 edition, Mahmudullah played for Fortune Barishal. He scored 208 runs in 12 innings.

In the 2024 Bangladesh Premier League he was retained by Fortune Barishal. He scored 237 runs in 13 innings with 2 half-centuries.

In the next season he was again named in the Fortune Barishal squad, following the draft for the 2025 Bangladesh Premier League players' draft. He scored 206 runs in 8 innings with 2 half-centuries. He also took 1 wickets with his best being 1/6.

==== Rangpur Riders ====
On 30 November 2025, in the 2026 BPL Auction he was bought by Rangpur Riders for ৳35 lakh.

=== Pakistan Super League ===
==== Quetta Gladiators ====
For the 2017 Pakistan Super League, Mahmudullah was contracted by Quetta Gladiators. He scored 37 runs in 3 innings. With the ball, he took 7 wickets with his best figure of 3/21.

In the 2018 Pakistan Super League, Mahmudullah scored 34 runs in 2 innings. He also took 1 wicket.

==== Multan Sultans ====
In April 2021, he was signed by Multan Sultans to play in the rescheduled matches in the 2021 Pakistan Super League. However he did not feature in any of the matches.

=== Dhaka Premier Division Cricket League ===
In 2017-18 Dhaka Premier Division Cricket League, Mahmudullah was the first pick in the player by choice draft for the Dhaka Premier League acquired by Sheikh Jamal Dhanmondi Club and becoming the highest-paid cricketer.

=== Bangabandhu T20 Cup ===
He played for Gemcon Khulna in 2020-21 Bangabandhu T20 Cup. Mahmudullah as the captain of Gemcon Khulna had won the first edition of Bangabandhu T20 Cup.

== International career ==
=== Debut years ===
Mahmudullah was called up for Bangladesh's ODI squad for the three-match series against Sri Lanka in Bangladesh's tour of Sri Lanka in July 2007. He made his debut on the tour, in the third ODI, where he was Bangladesh's second highest scorer with 36 runs and also took 2 wickets, in a match that Sri Lanka won by 39 runs.

He went on to be picked for Bangladesh's squads for a quadrangular series in Kenya in 2007 and the 2007 ICC World Twenty20.

Mahmudullah made his Test debut on 9 July 2009 against the West Indies. He performed poorly with the bat, but obtained the best test bowling figures in a match by a Bangladeshi on debut, with an eight-wicket haul, including a five wicket haul in the second innings. This played a major role in Bangladesh's second Test win, and the first on foreign soil.

=== As permanent member ===
Although Mahmudullah scored a Test century batting at number 8 against New Zealand, the selection committee preferred not to promote him up the order due to a perceived weakness against fast bowling, despite the number four spot having no permanent occupant. He was included in Bangladesh's 15-man squad for the 2011 ICC Cricket World Cup. On 20 September 2011, Mahmudullah was named Bangladesh's vice-captain, taking over from Tamim Iqbal after the previous captain and deputy were sacked. When West Indies toured in October, Mahmudullah missed all the fixtures with a viral fever. He recovered in time to rejoin the squad to face Pakistan in three ODIs in November. Mahmudullah scored 56 runs and bowled in just one match, taking three wickets from seven deliveries.

==== 2015 World Cup ====
On 9 March 2015, in the 2015 ICC Cricket World Cup, against England, he scored the first century by a Bangladeshi batsman in World Cup history. Bangladesh went on to win the match and went through to the quarterfinals. In the next match, on 13 March, he scored another World Cup century, this time against New Zealand, although New Zealand won by 3 wickets.

In six matches in the World Cup, he scored 365 runs at an average of 73.00 and eventually became the highest run scorer for Bangladesh in the World Cup. He was also named in the 'Team of the tournament' by Cricbuzz.

==== 2017 ICC Champions Trophy ====
Mahmudullah scored a century against New Zealand in a crucial virtual Quarterfinals for the semi-final berth. In that same match he along with Shakib Al Hasan set the record for the highest 5th wicket partnership in ICC Champions Trophy history with 224-run partnership and also the highest partnership for any wicket for Bangladesh.

=== Captaincy ===
In January 2018, during the tri-nation series final against Sri Lanka, permanent Test captain Shakib injured his left little finger which resulted in bruising and swelling and was ruled out of the Test series against Sri Lanka. With that Mahmudullah was named as captain of the Test team. On 31 January 2018, he became the tenth player to lead Bangladesh in Tests. Shakib Al Hasan was also ruled out of the first T20I, with Mahmudullah once again named as captain in his place. Under his captaincy, Bangladesh recorded their highest total in T20Is (193/5), but finally lost the match to Sri Lanka in Tri-nation Series in Bangladesh. In the next match against Sri Lanka in Nidahas Trophy, Bangladesh scored 200 runs for the first time when they chased down 214 to win the game. On 16 March, Mahmudullah scored an unbeaten 43 runs and made Bangladesh qualified for the Nidahas trophy final by hitting a six in the last decisive over to reach the target 160 runs for victory against Sri Lanka in the semi-final match.

In April 2018, he was one of ten cricketers to be awarded a central contract by the Bangladesh Cricket Board (BCB) ahead of the 2018 season. He was named captain in the squad for the home series against West Indies but Shakib al Hasan returned and captained.

=== 2019 Cricket World Cup ===
In April 2019, he was named in Bangladesh's squad for the 2019 Cricket World Cup.

For his poor performance in Test cricket, he was suggested by BCB to focus only on limited formats, henceforth in March 2020, when BCB published its new revised contract he was only given White ball contract.

In July 2021, he was added to Bangladesh's test squad for the one-off Test against Zimbabwe, after a gap of 17 months. The match was his 50th test match and he scored an unbeaten 150 runs, his career best in the first innings and making a 191-run partnership with Taskin Ahmed for ninth wicket, highest for Bangladesh, helping Bangladesh to win the test match by 220 runs. Eventually, he announced his retirement from test cricket after this match as well. On 20 July 2021, during the tour of Zimbabwe, Mahmudullah played in his 200th ODI match. In September 2021, Mahmudullah was named as the captain of Bangladesh's squad for the 2021 ICC Men's T20 World Cup.

=== 2023 Cricket World Cup ===
Mahmudullah was included in the Bangladesh squad for the 2023 Cricket World Cup. He was the top-scorer for Bangladesh in the tournament with 328 runs. Against South Africa, he scored the sole century for Bangladesh in this world cup, scoring 111 runs at the Wankhede Stadium. He also scored a fifty against Pakistan at Eden Gardens.

=== 2024-2025 ===
In May 2024, he was named in Bangladesh's squad for the 2024 ICC Men's T20 World Cup tournament. In the tournament, he scored 95 runs with the bat and took 1 wicket.

=== 2025-2026 ===
On 12 January 2025, he was named in Bangladesh's squad for the 2025 ICC Champions Trophy.

== Retirement ==
During the third day of the one-off Test match between Bangladesh and Zimbabwe in July 2021, Mahmudullah hinted to his teammates that he was retiring from Test cricket. The news was confirmed when the Bangladeshi players gave him a guard of honour before the start of the fifth day's play. His sudden decision to retire during a match was criticised by the BCB president, who said it would affect the team negatively. The match was his 50th match in Test cricket and he scored an unbeaten 150 runs, his career best, in the first innings, which earned him the Man of the Match award, and Bangladesh won by 220 runs. He officially announced his retirement from Test cricket in November 2021, before the First Test between Bangladesh and Pakistan.

On 8 October 2024, in pre-match press conference ahead of the second T20I against India, Riyad announced he will retire from T20I cricket after the last match of the series.

On 12 March 2025, Riyadh announced his retirement from international cricket by a Facebook post.

== Brand endorsement ==
Mahmudullah was signed by sports agency Imago Sports Management after the 2015 Cricket World Cup. Since 2015, Imago Sports Management has been managing Mahmudullah. HeidelbergCement Bangladesh Limited, a global cement company, has endorsed Mahmudullah for its product Scan Cement. Mahmudullah is the first Bangladeshi centurion in World Cup to sign a contract with HeidelbergCement Bangladesh Limited. Mahmudullah will be featured on Scan Cement billboards, TVC, and other promotional activities. Besides this, Mahmudullah partners with Helio (Mobile Handset Brand) for their social media content and Raw Nation (bat sponsor). As of February 2017, Mahmudullah has endorsement deals with Cheer Up, a beverage brand of PRAN.

=== USAID's Goodwill Ambassador for youth and development in Bangladesh ===
Mahmudullah will work with the United States Agency for International Development to engage thousands of young people via social media and public service announcements on the importance of youth empowerment in Bangladesh, and the need to increase education and nutrition, and reduce gender-based violence.

== Personal life ==
On 25 June 2011, Mahmudullah married Jannatul Kawsar Mishti. They have 2 sons, Raeed and Mayed. He is also the brother in law of fellow cricketer Mushfiqur Rahim as his (Mahmudullah's) wife's younger sister, Jannatul Kifayet Mondi is married to Mushfiqur.

In March 2023, he received his MBA degree from American International University-Bangladesh.

== International centuries ==
Test centuries by Mahmudullah
No.	Runs	Against	Venue	H/A	Date	Result	Ref
1	115	New Zealand	Seddon Park, Hamilton	Away	15 February 2010	Lost	
2	101*	Zimbabwe	Sher-e-Bangla National Cricket Stadium, Dhaka	Home	11 November 2018	Won	
3	136	West Indies	Sher-e-Bangla National Cricket Stadium, Dhaka	Home	30 November 2018	Won	
4	146	New Zealand	Seddon Park, Hamilton	Away	28 February 2019	Lost	
5	150*	Zimbabwe	Harare Sports Club, Harare	Away	7 July 2021	Won	

One Day International centuries by Mahmudullah
No.	Runs	Against	Venue	H/A/N	Date	Result	Ref
1	103	England	Adelaide Oval, Adelaide	Neutral	9 March 2015	Won	
2	128*	New Zealand	Seddon Park, Hamilton	Away	13 March 2015	Lost	
3	102*	New Zealand	Sophia Gardens, Cardiff	Neutral	9 June 2017	Won	
4	111	South Africa	Wankhede Stadium, Mumbai	Neutral	24 October 2023	Lost	

== Records and achievement ==
=== Captaincy record ===
Mahmudullah's record as captain
Format ↓	Matches	Won	Lost	Drawn/NR
Test	6	1	4	0
ODI	Did not captain			
T20I	43	16	25	0
Last updated on: 18 April 2024

- One of the most successful T20I captain for Bangladesh: 16 wins (Note: With Shakib Al Hasan combined. In September 2021, after winning the 2nd T20I match against New Zealand, he surpassed Mashrafe Mortaza(10 wins).)

=== International record ===
- Only the second cricketer (Note: after New Zealand's John Richard Reid) with the triple of scoring a century, taking five-wicket haul and effecting a stumping in test cricket.

=== National record ===
- First Bangladeshi batsman to score a century in Cricket World Cup. (Note: he scored a hundred against England in the 2015 Cricket World Cup.)
- First Bangladeshi batsman to score two consecutive century in the World Cup. (Note: He did so in the 2015 World Cup hitting centuries against England and New Zealand.)
- Most economical bowling by a Bangladeshi spinner in T20I : 8 runs in 4 overs against Afghanistan in 2014 ICC World Twenty20.
- First Bangladeshi player to play 100 T20I matches.
