= Disability in Bangladesh =

There are an estimated 16 million people with disabilities in Bangladesh, or 10% of the country's population. In 2004, the prevalence of disability was about 6% among those below the age of 18 and about 14% among those above that age. People in Bangladesh living with disabilities are entitled to government support, but programs have been limited in scope and restricted to urban areas, and the aspect of disability has not been integrated into general development programs. In response, NGOs such as the Centre for Disability in Development have moved to provide assistance to people with disabilities.

Perceptions of disability among most Bangladeshis remain largely negative. Especially in rural areas, disability is often viewed as a curse brought on by the misdeeds of parents, and is often believed to be contagious. Children with and without disabilities seldom become friends, creating a separation which continues into adult life.

Bangladesh is a party to the United Nations Convention on the Rights of Persons with Disabilities (CRPD), having signed the treaty on 9 May 2007 and ratified it soon after on 30 November 2007. On 9 October 2013, Bangladesh passed a bill called the Persons with Disabilities' Rights and Protection Act 2013, which implemented its obligations under the CRPD. This law replaced the Disabled Welfare Act 2001.

== Law ==
Persons with disabilities rights and safety law, 2013 provides human rights for people suffering from various disabilities.

== See also ==
- Deafness in Bangladesh
