= Sports Hub Bangladesh =

Sports Hub Bangladesh is an annual conference of sports governing body personnel, sports professionals, organizers, sports personalities and sports enthusiasts. The goal of the initiative is to bring together all the stakeholders of the Bangladesh sports industry and give them a platform to network. Young students, sports enthusiasts will have the opportunity to register as participants and learn about the nuances of the sports industry from the experts.

== First sports business conference of Bangladesh ==
On September 23, 2017, Imago Sports organized the first sports business conference of Bangladesh. Sports Industry stalwarts and marketing experts shared their take on current trends in Sports Marketing, Club & Franchise Management, Sports Journalism and Bangladesh Football. Followed by the sessions, a Sports Business Idea Competition for university students was organized. More than 400 participants were present during the event.

== The conference (2017) ==
=== Speakers: Session on Club & Franchise Management ===
Nafeesa Kamal, Owner, Comilla Victorians Kazi Inam Ahmed, Khulna Titans Tahmeed Azizul Huq, CEO, Rajshahi Kings

=== Speaker: Life After Cricket ===
Khaled Mahmud Sujon, Former Captain of Bangladesh national cricket team

=== Speaker: Football: Going Back to the Roots ===
Tabith Awal, Vice President, Bangladesh Football Federation

=== Speakers: Session on Sports Journalism 101 ===
Dilu Khandakar, sports editor, Channel 24 Sayeeduzzaman, sports editor, Kaler Kantho Mazhar Uddin, sports reporter, The Daily Star

=== Speaker: A True Fan:Do's and Don'ts ===
Zunaid Paiker, President, Bangladesh Cricket Supporters Association (BCSA)

=== Speakers: Session on Sports Marketing ===
Obeid Nizam, CEO, Dhaka Dynamites Nazim Farhan Chowdhury, managing director, Adcomm Ltd Iresh Zaker, executive director, Asiatic 360 Rabeth Khan, CEO, Macomm/Dentsu and Media axis/Carat-Dentsu Aegis Network
