= 2022–23 Dhaka Premier Division Cricket League =

Cricket tournament

- Dates: 15 March 2023 – 13 May 2023
- Administrator: Bangladesh Cricket Board
- Cricket format: List A
- Tournament format: Round-robin
- Champions: Abahani Limited (4th title)
- Participants: 12
- Matches: 84
- Most runs: Mohammad Naim (932)
- Most wickets: Parvez Rasool (33)

The 2022–23 Dhaka Premier Division Cricket League, also known as Walton Dhaka Premier Division Cricket League (for sponsorship reasons), is the ninth edition of the Dhaka Premier Division Cricket League, a List A cricket competition that is being held in Bangladesh. It is being played by the 12 club teams. The tournament started on 15 March 2023. All the matches are being played at the Sher-e-Bangla National Cricket Stadium, BKSP grounds and Khan Shaheb Osman Ali Stadium. The group phase of the tournament will continue until Eid al-Fitr, while the Super League will begin after the Eid break. In February 2023, the CCDM introduced three new awards for this edition: Player of the Tournament, Highest Run-Scorer and Highest Wicket-Taker, with a prize money of ৳2 lakh for each. They also decided to give ৳10,000 as the prize money for the Player of the Match.

== Teams and format ==
In March 2023, the 12 teams and the fixtures for the first three rounds of the competition were announced. Agrani Bank returned to the league, while a new team, Dhaka Leopards, joined the league for the first time. The competition is played in round-robin format, followed by play-offs among the top six teams for the championship and among the lowest three teams to determine relegation. The competing teams are as follows:

- Abahani Limited
- Agrani Bank
- Brothers Union
- City Club
- Dhaka Leopards
- Gazi Group Cricketers
- Legends of Rupganj
- Mohammedan Sporting Club
- Prime Bank Cricket Club
- Rupganj Tigers Cricket Club
- Sheikh Jamal Dhanmondi Club
- Shinepukur Cricket Club

== Squads ==
Abahani Limited	Agrani Bank	Brothers Union	City Club	Dhaka Leopards	Gazi Group Cricketers	Legends of Rupganj	Mohammedan Sporting Club	Prime Bank Cricket Club	Rupganj Tigers Cricket Club	Sheikh Jamal Dhanmondi Club	Shinepukur Cricket Club
Naim Sheikh; Mahmudul Hasan Joy; Afif Hossain; Mosaddek Hossain; Arpit Vasavada; Baba Indrajith; Nazmul Hossain Shanto; Anamul Haque Enam; Nahidul Islam; Rakibul Islam; Danish Aziz; Jaker Ali (wk); Mohammad Saifuddin; Tanvir Islam; Ripon Mondol; Rakibul Hasan; Tanzim Hasan Sakib	Ashraful Hasan Rihad; Azmir Ahmed; Ijharul Islam Kanon; Jahid Javed; Marshall Ayub; Nakib Rezwan Shams; Rohit Rayudu; Shadman Islam; Usman Khan; Abu Bakkar; Anamul Haque Jr; Azim Kazi; Fazle Rabby; Md. Nuruzzaman; Sahanur Rahman; Sharifullah; Aslam Hossain (Wk); Jahurul Islam; Md Fahim (Wk); Shamsul Islam; Abu Hider; Arafat Sunny; Asaduzzaman Payel; Elias Sunny; Hossain Ali; Islamul Ahsan; Kaykobad Mihal; Nahid Hasan; Nashed Uddin; Rony Hossain; Sagor; Sandip Roy	Aminul Islam; Anisul Islam Emon; Asadullah Galib; Dhiman Ghosh; Imtiaz Hossain; Mizanur Rahman Sayem; Mohammad Ashraful; Moin Khan; Myshukur Rahaman; Nadif Chowdhury; Rafsan Al Mahamud; Sabbir Hossain; Sadikur Rahman; Shadman Islam; Tanzid Hasan; Abdul Gaffar; Abdul Kayium; Chaturanga de Silva; Ifran Hossain; Naeem Islam jnr; Raihan Uddin; Saad Nasim; Sohag Gazi; Minhajul Abedin (Wk); Shamsul Islam (Wk); Zahiduzzaman; Abu Hider; Abu Raihan; Manik Khan; Mehedi Hasan; Mohor Sheikh; Moniruzzaman; Rahatul Ferdous; Sanjit Saha; Saqlain Sajib; Sujon Hawlader									

== Point Table ==
Group Stage

Teams	Pld	W	L	NR	Pts	NRR
Abahani Limited	11	10	1	0	20	+1.578
Sheikh Jamal Dhanmondi Club	11	10	1	0	20	+1.127
Legends of Rupganj	11	8	3	0	16	+0.592
Prime Bank Cricket Club	11	7	4	0	14	+0.080
Mohammedan Sporting Club	11	6	4	1	13	-0.444
Gazi Group Cricketers	11	5	5	1	11	-0.531
Rupganj Tigers Cricket Club	11	4	6	1	9	-0.621
Brothers Union	11	4	7	0	8	-0.264
City Club	11	4	7	0	8	-0.471
Agrani Bank Cricket Club	11	3	8	0	6	-0.434
Shinepukur Cricket Club	11	2	9	0	4	-0.884
Dhaka Leopards	11	1	9	1	3	-0.600

Teams qualified for the Super League phase of the tournament.

Teams qualified for the Relegation League play-offs phase of the tournament.

Super League

Team	Pld	W	L	NR	Pts	NRR
Abahani Limited (C)	16	14	2	0	28	+1.188
Sheikh Jamal Dhanmondi Club	16	13	3	0	26	+0.743
Prime Bank Cricket Club	16	10	6	0	20	+0.558
Legends of Rupganj	16	9	7	0	18	+0.052
Mohammedan Sporting Club	16	8	7	1	17	–0.607
Gazi Group Cricketers	16	7	8	1	15	+0.466

Champion

Relegation League

Team	Pld	W	L	NR	Pts	NRR
Shinepukur Cricket Club	13	4	9	0	8	–0.422
Agrani Bank Cricket Club (R)	13	4	9	0	8	–0.667
Dhaka Leopards (R)	13	1	11	1	3	–0.652

Team relegated to the 2023–24 Dhaka First Division Cricket League.

=== Round 1 ===
15 March 2023
09:30
Scorecard

Dhaka Leopards; 169 (39.3 overs)	v	Sheikh Jamal Dhanmondi Club; 173/2 (31.3 overs)
Pinak Ghosh 41 (60); Parvez Rasool 3/23 (9 overs)		Shykat Ali 63 (56); Chathuranga de Silva 1/23 (7 overs)

Sheikh Jamal Dhanmondi Club won by 8 wickets
Sher-e-Bangla National Cricket Stadium, Dhaka
Umpires: Gazi Sohel and Mozahiduzzaman
Player of the match: Towhid Hridoy (SJDC)

- Sheikh Jamal Dhanmondi Club won the toss and elected to field.
- Sheikh Jamal Dhanmondi Club were set a revised target of 172 runs from 42 overs.
- Ashikur Rahman made his List A debut.

15 March 2023
09:30
Scorecard

Agrani Bank Cricket Club; 243/8 (44 overs)	v	Legends of Rupganj; 215/3 (38.5 overs)
Azim Kazi 102 (105); Chirag Jani 3/38 (9 overs)		Irfan Sukkur 71* (77); Elias Sunny 1/18 (4 overs)

Legends of Rupganj won by 20 runs (DLS method)
Khan Shaheb Osman Ali Stadium, Fatullah
Umpires: Morshed Ali Khan and Sohrab Hossain
Player of the match: Chirag Jani (LOP)

- Legends of Rupganj won the toss elected to field.
- Anamul Haque and Sandip Kumar both made their List A debuts.

15 March 2023
09:30
Scorecard

Prime Bank Cricket Club; 216/6 (42 overs)	v	City Club; 209/7 (42 overs)
Alok Kapali 55* (47); Robiul Haque 2/25 (7 overs)		Asif Ahmed 51 (56); Aliss Islam 2/29 (8 overs)

Prime Bank Cricket Club won by 7 runs
Bangladesh Krira Shikkha Protisthan No 3 Ground, Savar
Umpires: Kamruzzaman Limon and Mahfuzur Rahman
Player of the match: Taijul Islam (PBCC)

- City Club won the toss and elected to field.
- Abdullah Al Mamun, Bishal Chowdhury, Saiful Islam and Taufiq Ahmed all made their List A debuts.

16 March 2023
09:30
Scorecard

Abahani Limited; 372/6 (50 overs)	v	Brothers Union; 248/6 (50 overs)
Anamul Haque 123 (118); Sabbir Hossain 3/75 (9 overs)		Mizanur Rahman 102 (116); Tanvir Islam 2/27 (10 overs)

Abahani Limited won by 124 runs
Sher-e-Bangla National Cricket Stadium, Dhaka
Umpires: Mahfuzur Rahman and Morshed Ali Khan
Player of the match: Anamul Haque (ABL)

- Brothers Union won the toss and elected to field.

16 March 2023
09:30
Scorecard

Rupganj Tigers Cricket Club; 216/6 (50 overs)	v	Shinepukur Cricket Club; 217/6 (46.2 overs)
Naeem Islam 86* (104); Farhad Reza 2/42 (8 overs)		Sangeeth Cooray 56 (82); Mukidul Islam 4/50 (10 overs)

Shinepukur Cricket Club won by 4 wickets
Bangladesh Krira Shikkha Protisthan No 3 Ground, Savar
Umpires: Mozahiduzzaman and Muhammad Kamruzzaman
Player of the match: Farhad Reza (SCC)

- Shinepukur Cricket Club won the toss and elected to field.
- Khalid Hasan (SCC) made his List A debut

16 March 2023
09:30
Scorecard

Gazi Group Cricketers; 349/7 (50 overs)	v	Mohammedan Sporting Club; 221 (39.2 overs)
Ravi Teja 66 (79); Khaled Ahmed 3/75 (10 overs)		Rony Talukdar 80 (61); Mohammad Enamul 2/31 (9 overs)

Gazi Group Cricketers won by 128 runs
Khan Shaheb Osman Ali Stadium, Fatullah
Umpires: Gazi Sohel and Ishtiaq Ahmed
Player of the match: SM Meherob (GGC)

- Mohammedan Sporting Club won the toss and elected to field.
- Habibur Rahman Sohan (GGC) made his List A debut.

=== Round 2 ===
18 March 2023
09:30
Scorecard

Sheikh Jamal Dhanmondi Club; 317/5 (50 overs)	v	Agrani Bank Cricket Club; 114 (31.4 overs)
Saif Hassan 108 (112); Abu Hider 3/65 (10 overs)		Jahid Javed 24* (43); Saif Hassan 3/18 (5.4 overs)

Sheikh Jamal Dhanmondi Club won by 203 runs
Bangladesh Krira Shikkha Protisthan No 3 Ground, Savar
Umpires: Mahfuzur Rahman and Shahin Al Asad
Player of the match: Saif Hassan (SJDC)

- Agrani Bank Cricket Club won the toss and elected to field.

18 March 2023
09:30
Scorecard

City Club; 248 (50 overs)	v	Legends of Rupganj; 252/3 (41.2 overs)
Abdullah Al Mamun 51 (77); Naeem Islam 3/33 (10 overs)		Sabbir Rahman 110* (107); Asif Ahmed 1/33 (6 overs)

Legends of Rupganj won by 7 wickets
Sher-e-Bangla National Cricket Stadium, Dhaka
Umpires: Habibur Rahman and Morshed Ali Khan
Player of the match: Sabbir Rahman (LOP)

- Legends of Rupganj won the toss and elected to field.

18 March 2023
09:30
Scorecard

Prime Bank Cricket Club; 268/8 (50 overs)	v	Brothers Union; 210 (40.1 overs)
Prantik Nawrose Nabil 83 (113); Sabbir Hossain 3/49 (10 overs)		Sabbir Hossain 125 (118); Rejaur Rahman Raja 4/30 (6.1 overs)

Prime Bank Cricket Club won by 58 runs
Khan Shaheb Osman Ali Stadium, Fatullah
Umpires: Ali Arman and Shafiuddin Ahmed
Player of the match: Sabbir Hossain (BU)

- Brothers Union won the toss and elected to field.
- Asadullah Galib (BU) made his List A debut.

19 March 2023
09:30
Scorecard

Rupganj Tigers Cricket Club; 222/5 (21 overs)	v	Mohammedan Sporting Club
Mominul Haque 74 (41); Khaled Ahmed 2/29 (4 overs)

No result
Sher-e-Bangla National Cricket Stadium, Dhaka
Umpires: Ali Arman and Muhammad Kamruzzaman

- Mohammedan Sporting Club won the toss and elected to field.
- Rain prevented any further play.

19 March 2023
09:30
Scorecard

Gazi Group Cricketers; 97/3 (20 overs)	v	Dhaka Leopards; 77/4 (13.1 overs)
Ravi Teja 33* (31); Chathuranga de Silva 1/14 (4 overs)		Pinak Ghosh 40 (27); Sumon Khan 2/8 (2 overs)

No result
Bangladesh Krira Shikkha Protisthan No 3 Ground, Savar
Umpires: Moniruzzaman and Reazul Islam

- Dhaka Leopards won the toss and elected to field.
- Dhaka Leopards were set a revised target of 133 runs from 20 overs.
- Rain prevented any further play.

19 March 2023
09:30
Scorecard

Shinepukur Cricket Club; 196/8 (33 overs)	v	Abahani Limited; 114/1 (21 overs)
Sajjadul Haque 36 (24); Tanvir Islam 3/27 (6 overs)		Anamul Haque 54* (64); Aminul Islam 1/14 (3 overs)

Abahani Limited won by 11 runs (DLS method)
Khan Shaheb Osman Ali Stadium, Fatullah
Umpires: Joynal Abedin and Mozahiduzzaman
Player of the match: Tanvir Islam (ABL)

- Abahani Limited won the toss and elected to field.
- Rain prevented any further play.

=== Round 3 ===
21 March 2023
09:30
Scorecard

Sheikh Jamal Dhanmondi Club; 228 (49.4 overs)	v	City Club; 162/8 (32 overs)
Saif Hassan 56 (79); Robiul Haque 4/36 (9 overs)		Towfiq Khan 42 (43); Shafiqul Islam 3/37 (7 overs)

Sheikh Jamal Dhanmondi Club won by 5 runs (DLS method)
Khan Shaheb Osman Ali Stadium, Fatullah
Umpires: Moniruzzaman and Mozahiduzzaman
Player of the match: Shykat Ali (SJDC)

- Sheikh Jamal Dhanmondi Club won the toss and elected to bat.

21 March 2023
09:30
Scorecard

Brothers Union; 299/5 (50 overs)	v	Legends of Rupganj; 302/7 (48.4 overs)
Tanzid Hasan 142 (142); Chirag Jani 2/47 (10 overs)		Chirag Jani 94 (84); Sabbir Hossain 3/41 (8 overs)

Legends of Rupganj won by 3 wickets
Bangladesh Krira Shikkha Protisthan No 3 Ground, Savar
Umpires: Ali Arman and Sajidul Islam
Player of the match: Chirag Jani (LOP)

- Legends of Rupganj won the toss and elected to field.

21 March 2023
09:30
Scorecard

Prime Bank Cricket Club; 295/8 (50 overs)	v	Shinepukur Cricket Club; 217 (45.1 overs)
Mohammad Mithun 93 (97); Farhad Reza 3/31 (5 overs)		Sangeeth Cooray 49 (79); Rubel Hossain 4/36 (8 overs)

Prime Bank Cricket Club won by 78 runs
Sher-e-Bangla National Cricket Stadium, Dhaka
Umpires: Mahfuzur Rahman and Sohrab Hossain
Player of the match: Mohammad Mithun (PBCC)

- Prime Bank Cricket Club won the toss and elected to bat.
- Nahid Rana (SCC) made his List A debut

22 March 2023
09:30
Scorecard

Mohammedan Sporting Club; 235/8 (50 overs)	v	Abahani Limited; 236/4 (34.3 overs)
Mahidul Islam Ankon 70 (85); Mohammad Saifuddin 4/45 (10 overs)		Mohammad Naim 110* (86); Soumya Sarkar 1/23 (2 overs)

Abahani Limited won by 6 wickets
Sher-e-Bangla National Cricket Stadium, Dhaka
Umpires: Ali Arman and Morshed Ali Khan
Player of the match: Mohammad Naim (ABL)

- Mohammedan Sporting Club won the toss and elected to bat.
- Rakibul Islam made his List A debut.

22 March 2023
09:30
Scorecard

Rupganj Tigers Cricket Club; 251/8 (50 overs)	v	Gazi Group Cricketers; 240 (48.4 overs)
Naeem Islam 78 (100); Mohammad Enamul 2/23 (10 overs)		Akbar Ali 88 (85); Alauddin Babu 5/35 (9.4 overs)

Rupganj Tigers Cricket Club won by 11 runs
Bangladesh Krira Shikkha Protisthan No 4 Ground, Savar
Umpires: Amit Mojumder and Barkatulylah Turkey
Player of the match: Alauddin Babu (RTCC)

- Gazi Group Cricketers won the toss and elected to field.

22 March 2023
09:30
Scorecard

Agrani Bank Cricket Club; 258/7 (50 overs)	v	Dhaka Leopards; 137 (36.3 overs)
Marshall Ayub 100 (108); Salauddin Sakil 3/45 (10 overs)		Moin Khan 31 (24); Elias Sunny 5/34 (10 overs)

Agrani Bank Cricket Club won by 121 runs
Bangladesh Krira Shikkha Protisthan No 3 Ground, Savar
Umpires: Muhammad Kamruzzaman and Nazmul Hasan
Player of the match: Marshall Ayub (ABCC)

- Dhaka Leopards won the toss and elected to field.
- Md Fahim (ABCC) made his List A debut.

== Relegation Stage ==
01 May 2023
Scorecard

Dhaka Leopards	v	Agrani Bank
252/7 (50 overs)		253/9 (50 overs)

Agrani Bank Cricket Club won by 1 wicket.

Scorecard

Dhaka Leopards	v	Shinepukur Cricket Club
197/10(43.5 Overs)		206/5(35.2 Overs)

Shinepukur won by 5 wickets (DLS method)

Scorecard

Shinepukur Cricket Club	v	Agrani Bank
316/5(50 Overs)		176/10(42.4 Overs)

Shinepukur won by 140 runs

== Super League Stage ==
Round 1

Scorecard

v

Scorecard

v

Scorecard

v

Round 2

Scorecard

v

Scorecard

v

Scorecard

v

Round 3

Scorecard

v

Scorecard

v

Scorecard

v

Round 4

Scorecard

v

Scorecard

v

Scorecard

v

Round 5

Scorecard

v

Scorecard

v

Scorecard

v
