= 2017–18 Dhaka Premier Division Cricket League =

Cricket tournament

- Dates: 5 February 2018 – 5 April 2018
- Administrator: Bangladesh Cricket Board
- Cricket format: List A
- Tournament format: Round-robin
- Champions: Abahani Limited (2nd title)
- Participants: 12
- Most runs: Najmul Hossain Shanto (749)
- Most wickets: Mashrafe Mortaza (39)

The 2017–18 Dhaka Premier Division Cricket League was an edition of the Dhaka Premier Division Cricket League, a List A cricket competition held in Bangladesh. It was the fifth edition of the tournament with List A status, although almost 35 seasons had been played before achieving the status. It started on 5 February 2018 and finished on 5 April 2018. Gazi Group Cricketers were the defending champions. Abahani Limited won the tournament, after beating Legends of Rupganj by 94 runs in the final Super League fixture.

The Bangladesh Cricket Board (BCB) held a draft system for players on 20 January 2018. Agrani Bank Cricket Club and Shinepukur Cricket Club were promoted from the Dhaka First Division Cricket League, replacing Partex Sporting Club and Victoria Sporting Club who had been relegated at the end of the previous tournament. Both newly promoted teams won their opening fixtures.

The first part of the tournament was played as a round-robin, before progressing to the championship and relegation phase. The Super League started on 24 March 2018 and the Relegation League started on 29 March 2018.

After the eleventh round of fixtures, Khelaghar Samaj Kallyan Samity had reached the Super League part of the tournament for the first time in their history. Abahani Limited, Legends of Rupganj, Prime Doleshwar Sporting Club, Gazi Group Cricketers and Sheikh Jamal Dhanmondi Club also joined Khelaghar Samaj Kallyan Samity in the Super League. On 30 March 2018, in the Super League fixture between Abahani Limited and Prime Doleshwar Sporting Club, Abahani Limited scored 393/4, setting a new record for the highest team total in List A cricket in Bangladesh.

The bottom three teams, Agrani Bank Cricket Club, Kala Bagan Krira Chakra and Brothers Union, faced off in the relegation playoffs. In the first match of the Relegation League, Agrani Bank Cricket Club defeated Kala Bagan Krira Chakra by six wickets, therefore relegating Kala Bagan Krira Chakra to the Dhaka First Division Cricket League for the next season. In the last match, Brothers Union beat Agrani Bank Cricket Club by 4 wickets, relegating Agrani Bank Cricket Club.

== Teams ==
The following teams competed:

- Abahani Limited
- Agrani Bank Cricket Club
- Brothers Union
- Gazi Group Cricketers
- Kala Bagan Krira Chakra
- Khelaghar Samaj Kallyan Samity
- Legends of Rupganj
- Mohammedan Sporting Club
- Prime Bank Cricket Club
- Prime Doleshwar Sporting Club
- Sheikh Jamal Dhanmondi Club
- Shinepukur Cricket Club

== Points tables ==
Group stage

| Team | Pld | W | L | T | Pts | NRR |
|---|---|---|---|---|---|---|
| Abahani Limited | 11 | 8 | 3 | 0 | 16 | +0.801 |
| Legends of Rupganj | 11 | 7 | 4 | 0 | 14 | +0.413 |
| Khelaghar Samaj Kallyan Samity | 11 | 7 | 4 | 0 | 14 | –0.178 |
| Prime Doleshwar Sporting Club | 11 | 6 | 4 | 1 | 13 | –0.153 |
| Sheikh Jamal Dhanmondi Club | 11 | 6 | 5 | 0 | 12 | +0.239 |
| Gazi Group Cricketers | 11 | 6 | 5 | 0 | 12 | –0.014 |
| Mohammedan Sporting Club | 11 | 5 | 5 | 1 | 11 | –0.069 |
| Shinepukur Cricket Club | 11 | 5 | 6 | 0 | 10 | +0.136 |
| Prime Bank Cricket Club | 11 | 5 | 6 | 0 | 10 | +0.094 |
| Brothers Union | 11 | 4 | 7 | 0 | 8 | –0.237 |
| Agrani Bank Cricket Club | 11 | 4 | 7 | 0 | 8 | –0.337 |
| Kala Bagan Krira Chakra | 11 | 2 | 9 | 0 | 4 | –0.662 |

Team qualified for the Super League phase of the tournament

Super League

| Team | Pld | W | L | T | Pts | NRR |
|---|---|---|---|---|---|---|
| Abahani Limited | 16 | 12 | 4 | 0 | 24 | +0.935 |
| Legends of Rupganj | 16 | 10 | 6 | 0 | 20 | +0.355 |
| Sheikh Jamal Dhanmondi Club | 16 | 10 | 6 | 0 | 20 | +0.158 |
| Prime Doleshwar Sporting Club | 16 | 8 | 7 | 1 | 17 | +0.027 |
| Khelaghar Samaj Kallyan Samity | 16 | 8 | 8 | 0 | 16 | –0.280 |
| Gazi Group Cricketers | 16 | 7 | 9 | 0 | 14 | –0.405 |

Champions

Relegation League

| Team | Pld | W | L | T | Pts | NRR |
|---|---|---|---|---|---|---|
| Brothers Union | 13 | 6 | 7 | 0 | 12 | –0.159 |
| Agrani Bank Cricket Club | 13 | 5 | 8 | 0 | 10 | –0.244 |
| Kala Bagan Krira Chakra | 13 | 2 | 11 | 0 | 4 | –0.648 |

Team relegated to the Dhaka First Division Cricket League

== Fixtures ==
=== Round robin ===
==== Round 1 ====
5 February 2018
Scorecard

| Gazi Group Cricketers; 176 (46.1 overs) | v | Agrani Bank Cricket Club; 178/2 (39.3 overs) |
| Mahedi Hasan 41 (77); Shahbaz Chouhan 3/31 (10 overs) | | Soumya Sarkar 89* (122); Mahedi Hasan 2/27 (10 overs) |

Agrani Bank Cricket Club won by 8 wickets
Bangladesh Krira Shikkha Protisthan No 3 Ground, Savar
Umpires: Gazi Sohel and Morshed Ali Khan
Player of the match: Soumya Sarkar (Agrani Bank Cricket Club)

- Agrani Bank Cricket Club won the toss and elected to field.
- Abu Naser (Gazi Group Cricketers) and Jahid Javed (Agrani Bank Cricket Club) both made their List A debuts.

5 February 2018
Scorecard

| Prime Doleshwar Sporting Club; 188/7 (50 overs) | v | Shinepukur Cricket Club; 189/5 (33.3 overs) |
| Marshall Ayub 74 (94); Sujon Hawlader 2/28 (10 overs) | | Shuvagata Hom 58 (76); Shahanur Rahman 1/15 (3 overs) |

Shinepukur Cricket Club won by 5 wickets
Khan Shaheb Osman Ali Stadium, Fatullah
Umpires: Masudur Rahman and Nadir Shah
Player of the match: Shuvagata Hom (Shinepukur Cricket Club)

- Shinepukur Cricket Club won the toss and elected to field.
- Salauddin Sakil (Prime Doleshwar Sporting Club), Mohammad Sozib, Towhid Hridoy and Fardeen Hasan Ony (Shinepukur Cricket Club) all made their List A debuts.

5 February 2018
Scorecard

| Khelaghar Samaj Kallyan Samity; 154 (41 overs) | v | Abahani Limited; 155/1 (25.2 overs) |
| Moinul Islam 43 (66); Mashrafe Mortaza 3/27 (7 overs) | | Anamul Haque 86* (73); Ashok Menaria 1/21 (6 overs) |

Abahani Limited won by 9 wickets
Bangladesh Krira Shikkha Protisthan No 4 Ground, Savar
Umpires: Anisur Rahman and Tanvir Ahmed
Player of the match: Mashrafe Mortaza (Abahani Limited)

- Khelaghar Samaj Kallyan Samity won the toss and elected to bat.
- Mahidul Islam Ankon, Hasan Mahmud and Sadikur Rahman (Khelaghar Samaj Kallyan Samity) all made their List A debuts.

7 February 2018
Scorecard

| Kala Bagan Krira Chakra; 172/8 (50 overs) | v | Prime Bank Cricket Club; 173/3 (36 overs) |
| Mahmudul Hasan 50* (68); Delwar Hossain 3/32 (10 overs) | | Zakir Hasan 56 (78); Mohammad Ashraful 1/24 (6 overs) |

Prime Bank Cricket Club won by 7 wickets
Khan Shaheb Osman Ali Stadium, Fatullah
Umpires: Mahfuzur Rahman and Sharfuddoula
Player of the match: Delwar Hossain (Prime Bank Cricket Club)

- Prime Bank Cricket Club won the toss and elected to field.
- Kunal Chandela and Shoriful Islam (Prime Bank Cricket Club) both made their List A debuts.

7 February 2018
Scorecard

| Mohammedan Sporting Club; 230/8 (50 overs) | v | Brothers Union; 232/5 (47.2 overs) |
| Shamsur Rahman 85 (107); Suhrawadi Shuvo 2/40 (10 overs) | | Alok Kapali 95* (91); Ebadot Hossain 2/31 (10 overs) |

Brothers Union won by 5 wickets
Bangladesh Krira Shikkha Protisthan No 3 Ground, Savar
Umpires: Masudur Rahman and Nadir Shah
Player of the match: Alok Kapali (Brothers Union)

- Brothers Union won the toss and elected to field.

7 February 2018
Scorecard

| Sheikh Jamal Dhanmondi Club; 230/9 (50 overs) | v | Legends of Rupganj; 227/8 (50 overs) |
| Nurul Hasan 90 (107); Asif Hasan 3/29 (10 overs) | | Naeem Islam 116* (116); Abu Jayed 4/42 (10 overs) |

Sheikh Jamal Dhanmondi Club won by 3 runs
Bangladesh Krira Shikkha Protisthan No 4 Ground, Savar
Umpires: Morshed Ali Khan and Tanvir Ahmed
Player of the match: Nurul Hasan (Sheikh Jamal Dhanmondi Club)

- Legends of Rupganj won the toss and elected to field.
- Al-Imran (Sheikh Jamal Dhanmondi Club) made his List A debut.
- Asif Hasan (Legends of Rupganj) took a hat-trick.

==== Round 2 ====
9 February 2018
Scorecard

| Gazi Group Cricketers; 279/6 (50 overs) | v | Shinepukur Cricket Club; 259 (48.4 overs) |
| Jaker Ali 90 (118); Mohammad Saifuddin 2/68 (10 overs) | | Uday Kaul 59 (59); Nayeem Hasan 3/36 (9 overs) |

Gazi Group Cricketers won by 20 runs
Bangladesh Krira Shikkha Protisthan No 4 Ground, Savar
Umpires: Gazi Sohel and Masudur Rahman
Player of the match: Jaker Ali (Gazi Group Cricketers)

- Shinepukur Cricket Club won the toss and elected to field.
- Rubel Ahmed (Gazi Group Cricketers) and Touhid Tareq (Shinepukur Cricket Club) both made their List A debuts.

9 February 2018
Scorecard

| Khelaghar Samaj Kallyan Samity; 199/7 (50 overs) | v | Prime Doleshwar Sporting Club; 200/9 (50 overs) |
| Nazimuddin 51 (93); Farhad Reza 4/37 (10 overs) | | Farhad Hossain 45 (88); Tanvir Islam 3/48 (10 overs) |

Prime Doleshwar Sporting Club won by 1 wicket
Khan Shaheb Osman Ali Stadium, Fatullah
Umpires: Moniruzzaman and Shafiuddin Ahmed
Player of the match: Farhad Reza (Prime Doleshwar Sporting Club)

- Prime Doleshwar Sporting Club won the toss and elected to field.
- Manik Khan (Prime Doleshwar Sporting Club) made his List A debut.

9 February 2018
Scorecard

| Abahani Limited; 217 (49.5 overs) | v | Kala Bagan Krira Chakra; 181 (48.1 overs) |
| Mashrafe Mortaza 67 (54); Muktar Ali 3/47 (9.5 overs) | | Muktar Ali 40 (39); Mashrafe Mortaza 4/49 (9.1 overs) |

Abahani Limited won by 36 runs
Bangladesh Krira Shikkha Protisthan No 3 Ground, Savar
Umpires: Mahfuzur Rahman and Morshed Ali Khan
Player of the match: Mashrafe Mortaza (Abahani Limited)

- Kala Bagan Krira Chakra won the toss and elected to field.

11 February 2018
Scorecard

| Brothers Union; 294/7 (50 overs) | v | Prime Bank Cricket Club; 270 (47.4 overs) |
| Alok Kapali 79 (67); Delwar Hossain 2/54 (7 overs) | | Nahidul Islam 88 (69); Alok Kapali 3/46 (10 overs) |

Brothers Union won by 24 runs
Bangladesh Krira Shikkha Protisthan No 3 Ground, Savar
Umpires: Mahfuzur Rahman and Masudur Rahman
Player of the match: Alok Kapali (Brothers Union)

- Prime Bank Cricket Club won the toss and elected to field.

11 February 2018
Scorecard

| Legends of Rupganj; 231/7 (50 overs) | v | Mohammedan Sporting Club; 169 (44.3 overs) |
| Abdul Mazid 70 (115); Qazi Onik 5/44 (10 overs) | | Shamsur Rahman 34 (53); Mosharraf Hossain 4/23 (8 overs) |

Legends of Rupganj won by 62 runs
Khan Shaheb Osman Ali Stadium, Fatullah
Umpires: Nadir Shah and Sharfuddoula
Player of the match: Abdul Mazid (Legends of Rupganj)

- Mohammedan Sporting Club won the toss and elected to field.
- Aminul Islam (Mohammedan Sporting Club) made his List A debut.
- Qazi Onik (Mohammedan Sporting Club) took his first five-wicket haul in List A cricket.

11 February 2018
Scorecard

| Sheikh Jamal Dhanmondi Club; 294/9 (50 overs) | v | Agrani Bank Cricket Club; 266 (49.1 overs) |
| Tanbir Hayder 71 (48); Shafiul Islam 4/68 (10 overs) | | Dhiman Ghosh 48 (47); Nazmul Islam 3/21 (6.1 overs) |

Sheikh Jamal Dhanmondi Club won by 28 runs
Bangladesh Krira Shikkha Protisthan No 4 Ground, Savar
Umpires: Shafiuddin Ahmed and Tanvir Ahmed
Player of the match: Tanbir Hayder (Sheikh Jamal Dhanmondi Club)

- Agrani Bank Cricket Club won the toss and elected to field.
- Digvijay Rangi (Sheikh Jamal Dhanmondi Club) made his List A debut.

==== Round 3 ====
13 February 2018
Scorecard

| Gazi Group Cricketers; 247/5 (50 overs) | v | Khelaghar Samaj Kallyan Samity; 249/5 (48.3 overs) |
| Jahurul Islam 102 (142); Rafsan Al Mahmud 1/12 (4 overs) | | Mahidul Islam Ankon 85 (109); Nayeem Hasan 2/48 (10 overs) |

Khelaghar Samaj Kallyan Samity won by 5 wickets
Bangladesh Krira Shikkha Protisthan No 3 Ground, Savar
Umpires: Sharfuddoula and Tanvir Ahmed
Player of the match: Mahidul Islam Ankon (Khelaghar Samaj Kallyan Samity)

- Khelaghar Samaj Kallyan Samity won the toss and elected to field.
- Ruhel Ahmed (Gazi Group Cricketers) made his List A debut.

13 February 2018
Scorecard

| Kala Bagan Krira Chakra; 290/4 (50 overs) | v | Prime Doleshwar Sporting Club; 291/2 (45 overs) |
| Taibur Rahman 114* (109); Manik Khan 2/44 (8 overs) | | Litton Das 143* (123); Jatin S Saxena 2/57 (8 overs) |

Prime Doleshwar Sporting Club won by 8 wickets
Bangladesh Krira Shikkha Protisthan No 4 Ground, Savar
Umpires: Anisur Rahman and Gazi Sohel
Player of the match: Litton Das (Prime Doleshwar Sporting Club)

- Prime Doleshwar Sporting Club won the toss and elected to field.

13 February 2018
Scorecard

| Abahani Limited; 266 (50 overs) | v | Brothers Union; 130 (35.4 overs) |
| Saif Hassan 108 (132); Khaled Ahmed 2/44 (10 overs) | | Yasir Ali 35* (42); Mehidy Hasan Miraz 3/24 (6 overs) |

Abahani Limited won by 136 runs
Khan Shaheb Osman Ali Stadium, Fatullah
Umpires: Mahfuzur Rahman and Nadir Shah
Player of the match: Saif Hassan (Abahani Limited)

- Brothers Union won the toss and elected to field.
- Roni Hossen (Brothers Union) made his List A debut.

15 February 2018
Scorecard

| Legends of Rupganj; 239/6 (50 overs) | v | Prime Bank Cricket Club; 215 (48.2 overs) |
| Abdul Mazid 110 (122); Delwar Hossain 3/40 (9 overs) | | Al-Amin 68 (87); Mohammad Shahid 3/32 (9.2 overs) |

Legends of Rupganj won by 24 runs
Khan Shaheb Osman Ali Stadium, Fatullah
Umpires: Moniruzzaman and Nadir Shah
Player of the match: Abdul Mazid (Legends of Rupganj)

- Prime Bank Cricket Club won the toss and elected to field.

15 February 2018
Scorecard

| Sheikh Jamal Dhanmondi Club; 287/9 (50 overs) | v | Mohammedan Sporting Club; 290/5 (48.1 overs) |
| Nurul Hasan 77 (59); Taijul Islam 2/40 (10 overs) | | Shamsur Rahman 123* (124); Robiul Haque 2/55 (9 overs) |

Mohammedan Sporting Club won by 5 wickets
Bangladesh Krira Shikkha Protisthan No 3 Ground, Savar
Umpires: Shafiuddin Ahmed and Morshed Ali Khan
Player of the match: Shamsur Rahman (Mohammedan Sporting Club)

- Mohammedan Sporting Club won the toss and elected to field.
- Robiul Haque (Sheikh Jamal Dhanmondi Club) made his List A debut.

15 February 2018
Scorecard

| Shinepukur Cricket Club; 264/6 (50 overs) | v | Agrani Bank Cricket Club; 268/5 (46.5 overs) |
| Towhid Hridoy 122* (125); Abdur Razzak 3/56 (10 overs) | | Dhiman Ghosh 85* (76); Shuvagata Hom 2/59 (10 overs) |

Agrani Bank Cricket Club won by 5 wickets
Bangladesh Krira Shikkha Protisthan No 4 Ground, Savar
Umpires: Akteruzzaman and Gazi Sohel
Player of the match: Dhiman Ghosh (Agrani Bank Cricket Club)

- Shinepukur Cricket Club won the toss and elected to bat.
- Minhaz Khan (Shinepukur Cricket Club) and Saymon Ahmed (Agrani Bank Cricket Club) both made their List A debuts.

==== Round 4 ====
17 February 2018
Scorecard

| Kala Bagan Krira Chakra; 232/7 (50 overs) | v | Gazi Group Cricketers; 177 (45.1 overs) |
| Akbar-ur-Rehman 80 (111); Rajat Bhatia 2/35 (6 overs) | | Imrul Kayes 74 (78); Akbar-ur-Rehman 4/35 (8.1 overs) |

Kalabagan Krira Chakra won by 55 runs
Khan Shaheb Osman Ali Stadium, Fatullah
Umpires: Mahfuzur Rahman and Moniruzzaman
Player of the match: Akbar-ur-Rehman (Kala Bagan Krira Chakra)

- Gazi Group Cricketers won the toss and elected to field.
- Tipu Sultan (Gazi Group Cricketers) made his List A debut.

17 February 2018
Scorecard

| Brothers Union; 214 (46.5 overs) | v | Prime Doleshwar Sporting Club; 215/4 (47.5 overs) |
| Mizanur Rahman 71 (79); Ryan ten Doeschate 3/38 (8.5 overs) | | Fazle Mahmud 73 (80); Alok Kapali 3/47 (10 overs) |

Prime Doleshwar Sporting Club won by 6 wickets
Bangladesh Krira Shikkha Protisthan No 4 Ground, Savar
Umpires: Morshed Ali Khan and Shafiuddin Ahmed
Player of the match: Fazle Mahmud (Prime Doleshwar Sporting Club)

- Prime Doleshwar Sporting Club won the toss and elected to field.
- Shakil Hossain (Brothers Union) made his List A debut.

17 February 2018
Scorecard

| Legends of Rupganj; 247/8 (50 overs) | v | Abahani Limited; 253/5 (48 overs) |
| Abdul Mazid 89 (114); Taskin Ahmed 3/61 (10 overs) | | Saif Hassan 78 (82); Mosharraf Hossain 2/41 (10 overs) |

Abahani Limited won by 5 wickets
Bangladesh Krira Shikkha Protisthan No 3 Ground, Savar
Umpires: Nadir Shah and Tanvir Ahmed
Player of the match: Saif Hassan (Abahani Limited)

- Legends of Rupganj won the toss and elected to bat.
- Ashiquzzaman (Legends of Rupganj) made his List A debut.

19 February 2018
Scorecard

| Prime Bank Cricket Club; 227 (50 overs) | v | Sheikh Jamal Dhanmondi Club; 229/5 (44.4 overs) |
| Mehedi Maruf 41 (75); Robiul Haque 3/34 (9 overs) | | Ziaur Rahman 67 (76); Monir Hossain 2/38 (10 overs) |

Sheikh Jamal Dhanmondi Club won by 5 wickets
Khan Shaheb Osman Ali Stadium, Fatullah
Umpires: Shafiuddin Ahmed and Mahfuzur Rahman (Sheikh Jamal Dhanmondi Club)
Player of the match: Ziaur Rahman

- Prime Bank Cricket Club won the toss and elected to bat.

19 February 2018
Scorecard

| Mohammedan Sporting Club; 335/7 (50 overs) | v | Agrani Bank Cricket Club; 176 (37.4 overs) |
| Irfan Sukkur 92 (83); Soumya Sarkar 2/72 (10 overs) | | Dhiman Ghosh 40 (35); Bipul Sharma 2/22 (3.4 overs) |

Mohammedan Sporting Club won by 159 runs
Shere Bangla National Stadium, Mirpur
Umpires: Imran Parvez and Tanvir Ahmed
Player of the match: Irfan Sukkur (Mohammedan Sporting Club)

- Agrani Bank Cricket Club won the toss and elected to field.
- Mohammad Ishak (Agrani Bank Cricket Club) made his List A debut.

19 February 2018
Scorecard

| Shinepukur Cricket Club; 294/7 (50 overs) | v | Khelaghar Samaj Kallyan Samity; 206 (45.4 overs) |
| Uday Kaul 137 (136); Moinul Islam 2/17 (3 overs) | | Rafsan Al Mahmud 62 (79); Raihan Uddin 3/22 (7 overs) |

Shinepukur Cricket Club won by 88 runs
Bangladesh Krira Shikkha Protisthan No 3 Ground, Savar
Umpires: Akteruzzaman and Nadir Shah
Player of the match: Uday Kaul (Shinepukur Cricket Club)

- Khelaghar Samaj Kallyan Samity won the toss and elected to field.

==== Round 5 ====
22 February 2018
Scorecard

| Brothers Union; 273/5 (50 overs) | v | Gazi Group Cricketers; 276/8 (49.1 overs) |
| Debabrata Das 112* (119); Nayeem Hasan 2/29 (9 overs) | | Gurkeerat Singh 71* (88); Nihaduzzaman 2/43 (6.1 overs) |

Gazi Group Cricketers won by 2 wickets
Bangladesh Krira Shikkha Protisthan No 3 Ground, Savar
Umpires: Anisur Rahman and Moniruzzaman
Player of the match: Gurkeerat Singh (Gazi Group Cricketers)

- Gazi Group Cricketers won the toss and elected to field.

22 February 2018
Scorecard

| Legends of Rupganj; 272/7 (50 overs) | v | Prime Doleshwar Sporting Club; 217 (47.5 overs) |
| Mushfiqur Rahim 65 (67); Arafat Sunny 3/40 (9 overs) | | Imtiaz Hossain 35 (43); Mosharraf Hossain 4/40 (10 overs) |

Legends of Rupganj won by 55 runs
Shere Bangla National Stadium, Mirpur
Umpires: Nadir Shah and Mahfuzur Rahman
Player of the match: Naeem Islam (Legends of Rupganj)

- Prime Doleshwar Sporting Club won the toss and elected to field.
- Mohammad Naim (Legends of Rupganj) made his List A debut.

22 February 2018
Scorecard

| Abahani Limited; 270/7 (50 overs) | v | Sheikh Jamal Dhanmondi Club; 223 (45.3 overs) |
| Anamul Haque 116 (122); Robiul Haque 3/47 (5 overs) | | Nurul Hasan 83 (61); Mashrafe Mortaza 5/29 (8.3 overs) |

Abahani Limited won by 47 runs
Bangladesh Krira Shikkha Protisthan No 4 Ground, Savar
Umpires: Gazi Sohel and Masudur Rahman (Abahani Limited)
Player of the match: Mashrafe Mortaza and Anamul Haque

- Abahani Limited won the toss and elected to bat.

24 February 2018
Scorecard

| Prime Bank Cricket Club; 259/9 (50 overs) | v | Mohammedan Sporting Club; 260/7 (48.5 overs) |
| Al-Amin 110 (126); Taijul Islam 3/53 (10 overs) | | Raqibul Hasan 64 (59); Rubel Hossain 2/41 (9.5 overs) |

Mohammedan Sporting Club won by 3 wickets
Bangladesh Krira Shikkha Protisthan No 3 Ground, Savar
Umpires: Morshed Ali Khan and Masudur Rahman
Player of the match: Al-Amin (Prime Bank Cricket Club)

- Mohammedan Sporting Club won the toss and elected to field.

24 February 2018
Scorecard

| Kala Bagan Krira Chakra; 232/9 (50 overs) | v | Shinepukur Cricket Club; 233/4 (42.3 overs) |
| Akbar-ur-Rehman 71 (91); Shuvagata Hom 3/34 (9 overs) | | Afif Hossain 67* (70); Abul Hasan 1/29 (8 overs) |

Shinepukur Cricket Club won by 6 wickets
Shere Bangla National Stadium, Mirpur
Umpires: Mahfuzur Rahman and Gazi Sohel
Player of the match: Shuvagata Hom (Shinepukur Cricket Club)

- Kala Bagan Krira Chakra won the toss and elected to bat.

24 February 2018
Scorecard

| Agrani Bank Cricket Club; 259/8 (50 overs) | v | Khelaghar Samaj Kallyan Samity; 261/3 (47.4 overs) |
| Jahid Javed 54 (56); Robiul Islam Robi 2/19 (4 overs) | | Mahidul Islam Ankon 115* (131); Shafiul Islam 3/33 (8.4 overs) |

Khelaghar Samaj Kallyan Samity won by 7 wickets
Khan Shaheb Osman Ali Stadium, Fatullah
Umpires: Nadir Shah and Tanvir Ahmed
Player of the match: Mahidul Islam Ankon (Khelaghar Samaj Kallyan Samity)

- Agrani Bank Cricket Club won the toss and elected to bat.
- Mahidul Islam Ankon (Khelaghar Samaj Kallyan Samity) scored his first century in List A cricket.

==== Round 6 ====
26 February 2018
Scorecard

| Gazi Group Cricketers; 190 (32.4 overs) | v | Legends of Rupganj; 191/5 (32.1 overs) |
| Nadif Chowdhury 75 (61); Mohammad Sharif 6/33 (6.4 overs) | | Parvez Rasool 61* (57); Nayeem Hasan 3/38 (7 overs) |

Legends of Rupganj won by 5 wickets
Bangladesh Krira Shikkha Protisthan No 3 Ground, Savar
Umpires: Tanvir Ahmed and Anisur Rahman
Player of the match: Mohammad Sharif (Legends of Rupganj)

- Legends of Rupganj won the toss and elected to field.
- Mohammad Sharif (Legends of Rupganj) took a hat-trick.

26 February 2018
Scorecard

| Prime Doleshwar Sporting Club; 293/6 (50 overs) | v | Sheikh Jamal Dhanmondi Club; 237 (45 overs) |
| Fazle Mahmud 120* (101); Robiul Haque 2/36 (10 overs) | | Nurul Hasan 100 (88); Farhad Reza 4/56 (9 overs) |

Prime Doleshwar Sporting Club won by 56 runs
Khan Shaheb Osman Ali Stadium, Fatullah
Umpires: Nadir Shah and Mahfuzur Rahman
Player of the match: Fazle Mahmud (Prime Doleshwar Sporting Club)

- Sheikh Jamal Dhanmondi Club won the toss and elected to field.

26 February 2018
Scorecard

| Abahani Limited; 259 (49.4 overs) | v | Mohammedan Sporting Club; 147 (30.4 overs) |
| Nasir Hossain 67 (73); Mohammad Azim 3/26 (6.4 overs) | | Irfan Sukkur 40 (35); Mehedi Hasan 3/28 (8.4 overs) |

Abahani Limited won by 112 runs
Shere Bangla National Stadium, Mirpur
Umpires: Masudur Rahman and Gazi Sohel
Player of the match: Anamul Haque (Abahani Limited)

- Mohammedan Sporting Club won the toss and elected to field.

28 February 2018
Scorecard

| Prime Bank Cricket Club; 272/8 (50 overs) | v | Agrani Bank Cricket Club; 230 (46.5 overs) |
| Mehedi Maruf 54 (66); Shafiul Islam 2/45 (9 overs) | | Dhiman Ghosh 73 (74); Delwar Hossain 3/41 (7.5 overs) |

Prime Bank Cricket Club won by 42 runs
Khan Shaheb Osman Ali Stadium, Fatullah
Umpires: Gazi Sohel and Anisur Rahman
Player of the match: Delwar Hossain (Prime Bank Cricket Club)

- Agrani Bank Cricket Club won the toss and elected to field.

28 February 2018
Scorecard

| Khelaghar Samaj Kallyan Samity; 238 (50 overs) | v | Kala Bagan Krira Chakra; 223/9 (50 overs) |
| Ashok Menaria 95 (98); Rahatul Ferdous 3/44 (10 overs) | | Taibur Rahman 81 (113); Hasan Mahmud 3/47 (10 overs) |

Khelaghar Samaj Kallyan Samity won by 15 runs
Shere Bangla National Stadium, Mirpur
Umpires: Morshed Ali Khan and Moniruzzaman
Player of the match: Ashok Menaria (Khelaghar Samaj Kallyan Samity)

- Kala Bagan Krira Chakra won the toss and elected to field.
- Taibur Rahman and Abul Hasan (Kala Bagan Krira Chakra) scored 136 runs for the eighth wicket, after Kala Bagan were 34 for 7. This was the first partnership of more than 100 runs for a team seven wickets down for fewer than 100 runs in List A cricket in Bangladesh.

28 February 2018
Scorecard

| Shinepukur Cricket Club; 288/8 (50 overs) | v | Brothers Union; 289/5 (49.1 overs) |
| Shuvagata Hom 116 (98); Suhrawadi Shuvo 3/68 (10 overs) | | Myshukur Rahaman 88 (107); Raihan Uddin 2/49 (10 overs) |

Brothers Union won by 5 wickets
Bangladesh Krira Shikkha Protisthan No 3 Ground, Savar
Umpires: Masudur Rahman and Mahfuzur Rahman
Player of the match: Myshukur Rahaman (Brothers Union)

- Shinepukur Cricket Club won the toss and elected to bat.
- Shakhawat Hossain (Brothers Union) made his List A debut.

==== Round 7 ====
2 March 2018
Scorecard

| Sheikh Jamal Dhanmondi Club; 265/8 (50 overs) | v | Gazi Group Cricketers; 170 (42.4 overs) |
| Shykat Ali 115* (118); Nayeem Hasan 2/49 (10 overs) | | Gurkeerat Singh 67 (77); Sajedul Islam 2/14 (2.4 overs) |

Sheikh Jamal Dhanmondi Club won by 95 runs
Shere Bangla National Stadium, Mirpur
Umpires: Masudur Rahman and Moniruzzaman
Player of the match: Shykat Ali (Sheikh Jamal Dhanmondi Club)

- Sheikh Jamal Dhanmondi Club won the toss and elected to bat.

2 March 2018
Scorecard

| Mohammedan Sporting Club; 286 (49.5 overs) | v | Prime Doleshwar Sporting Club; 286/9 (50 overs) |
| Shamsur Rahman 75 (93); Farhad Reza 3/66 (9.5 overs) | | Litton Das 129 (122); Mohammad Azim 6/67 (10 overs) |

Match tied
Khan Shaheb Osman Ali Stadium, Fatullah
Umpires: Tanvir Ahmed and Nadir Shah
Player of the match: Mohammad Azim (Mohammedan Sporting Club)

- Mohammedan Sporting Club won the toss and elected to bat.

2 March 2018
Scorecard

| Prime Bank Cricket Club; 246 (49.2 overs) | v | Abahani Limited; 237/9 (50 overs) |
| Al-Amin 84 (98); Mashrafe Mortaza 4/41 (9.2 overs) | | Saif Hassan 75 (127); Shoriful Islam 4/51 (10 overs) |

Prime Bank Cricket Club won by 9 runs
Bangladesh Krira Shikkha Protisthan No 3 Ground, Savar
Umpires: Gazi Sohel and Anisur Rahman
Player of the match: Shoriful Islam (Prime Bank Cricket Club)

- Prime Bank Cricket Club won the toss and elected to bat.
- Mohammad Rakib (Abahani Limited) made his List A debut.

4 March 2018
Scorecard

| Legends of Rupganj; 268/3 (50 overs) | v | Shinepukur Cricket Club; 272/9 (50 overs) |
| Mohammad Naim 93 (130); Shuvagata Hom 1/21 (10 overs) | | Shadman Islam 95 (116); Mohammad Shahid 3/50 (8 overs) |

Shinepukur Cricket Club won by 1 wicket
Shere Bangla National Stadium, Mirpur
Umpires: Mahfuzur Rahman and Akteruzzaman
Player of the match: Shadman Islam (Shinepukur Cricket Club)

- Shinepukur Cricket Club won the toss and elected to field.

4 March 2018
Scorecard

| Brothers Union; 187 (46 overs) | v | Khelaghar Samaj Kallyan Samity; 188/7 (49.3 overs) |
| Alok Kapali 66 (83); Hasan Mahmud 3/24 (8 overs) | | Ashok Menaria 55 (77); Suhrawadi Shuvo 2/18 (7.3 overs) |

Khelaghar Samaj Kallyan Samity won by 3 wickets
Khan Shaheb Osman Ali Stadium, Fatullah
Umpires: Nadir Shah and Tanvir Ahmed
Player of the match: Ashok Menaria (Khelaghar Samaj Kallyan Samity)

- Khelaghar Samaj Kallyan Samity won the toss and elected to field.

4 March 2018
Scorecard

| Agrani Bank Cricket Club; 252/9 (50 overs) | v | Kala Bagan Krira Chakra; 256/5 (48.4 overs) |
| Shahriar Nafees 99 (125); Akbar-ur-Rehman 3/34 (10 overs) | | Tasamul Haque 106 (115); Al-Amin Hossain 2/27 (9 overs) |

Kala Bagan Krira Chakra won by 5 wickets
Bangladesh Krira Shikkha Protisthan No 3 Ground, Savar
Umpires: Shafiuddin Ahmed and Morshed Ali Khan
Player of the match: Mohammad Ashraful (Kala Bagan Krira Chakra)

- Kala Bagan Krira Chakra won the toss and elected to field.

==== Round 8 ====
6 March 2018
Scorecard

| Gazi Group Cricketers; 137 (35.4 overs) | v | Mohammedan Sporting Club; 108 (33.2 overs) |
| Asif Ahmed 35 (48); Qazi Onik 4/28 (8 overs) | | Raqibul Hasan 22 (33); Nayeem Hasan 3/27 (10 overs) |

Gazi Group Cricketers won by 29 runs
Shere Bangla National Stadium, Mirpur
Umpires: Nadir Shah and Tanvir Ahmed
Player of the match: Nayeem Hasan (Gazi Group Cricketers)

- Gazi Group Cricketers won the toss and elected to bat.

6 March 2018
Scorecard

| Prime Doleshwar Sporting Club; 286/5 (50 overs) | v | Prime Bank Cricket Club; 287/9 (49.4 overs) |
| Marshall Ayub 135 (128); Yusuf Pathan 1/19 (4 overs) | | Mehrab Hossain 102 (125); Mamun Hossain 2/46 (7.4 overs) |

Prime Bank Cricket Club won by 1 wicket
Bangladesh Krira Shikkha Protisthan No 3 Ground, Savar
Umpires: Anisur Rahman and Morshed Ali Khan
Player of the match: Marshall Ayub (Prime Doleshwar Sporting Club)

- Prime Doleshwar Sporting Club won the toss and elected to bat.

6 March 2018
Scorecard

| Abahani Limited; 290/6 (50 overs) | v | Agrani Bank Cricket Club; 279 (49.5 overs) |
| Najmul Hossain Shanto 133* (123); Salman Hossain 2/40 (10 overs) | | Shahriar Nafees 121 (119); Mashrafe Mortaza 6/44 (9.5 overs) |

Abahani Limited won by 11 runs
Khan Shaheb Osman Ali Stadium, Fatullah
Umpires: Masudur Rahman and Mahfuzur Rahman
Player of the match: Najmul Hossain Shanto (Abahani Limited)

- Abahani Limited won the toss and elected to bat.
- Ariful Hasan Sobuz (Abahani Limited) and Fazle Rabby (Agrani Bank Cricket Club) both made their List A debuts.
- Mashrafe Mortaza (Abahani Limited) took his first List A hat-trick and became the first Bangaleshi bowler to take four wickets in four balls in List A cricket.

8 March 2018
Scorecard

| Sheikh Jamal Dhanmondi Club; 262 (49.5 overs) | v | Shinepukur Cricket Club; 263/2 (48.3 overs) |
| Ziaur Rahman 79 (87); Abdul Gaffar 2/14 (7 overs) | | Shadman Islam 144* (147); Sohag Gazi 1/46 (10 overs) |

Shinepukur Cricket Club won by 8 wickets
Shere Bangla National Stadium, Mirpur
Umpires: Masudur Rahman and Tanvir Ahmed
Player of the match: Shadman Islam (Shinepukur Cricket Club)

- Sheikh Jamal Dhanmondi Club won the toss and elected to bat.
- Abdul Gaffar (Shinepukur Cricket Club) made his List A debut.

8 March 2018
Scorecard

| Khelaghar Samaj Kallyan Samity; 259/4 (50 overs) | v | Legends of Rupganj; 262/4 (46.3 overs) |
| Robiul Islam Robi 116 (138); Asif Hasan 1/33 (9 overs) | | Mohammad Naim 82 (96); Rafsan Al Mahmud 2/35 (8 overs) |

Legends of Rupganj won by 6 wickets
Bangladesh Krira Shikkha Protisthan No 3 Ground, Savar
Umpires: Shafiuddin Ahmed and Sohrab Hossain
Player of the match: Mohammad Naim (Legends of Rupganj)

- Khelaghar Samaj Kallyan Samity won the toss and elected to bat.

8 March 2018
Scorecard

| Brothers Union; 317/4 (50 overs) | v | Kala Bagan Krira Chakra; 186 (45 overs) |
| Junaid Siddique 123 (111); Mahmudul Hasan 1/39 (6 overs) | | Muktar Ali 62* (59); Sohrawordi Shuvo 3/39 (9 overs) |

Brothers Union won by 131 runs
Khan Shaheb Osman Ali Stadium, Fatullah
Umpires: Gazi Sohel and Mahfuzur Rahman
Player of the match: Junaid Siddique (Brothers Union)

- Kala Bagan Krira Chakra won the toss and elected to field.

==== Round 9 ====
10 March 2018
Scorecard

| Prime Bank Cricket Club; 257/9 (50 overs) | v | Gazi Group Cricketers; 258/3 (48.5 overs) |
| Yusuf Pathan 72* (60); Nayeem Hasan 4/53 (10 overs) | | Gazi Group Cricketers 103* (113); Enamul Haque 2/52 (10 overs) |

Gazi Group Cricketers won by 7 wickets
Bangladesh Krira Shikkha Protisthan No 3 Ground, Savar
Umpires: Shafiuddin Ahmed and Ali Arman
Player of the match: Jahurul Islam (Gazi Group Cricketers)

- Gazi Group Cricketers won the toss and elected to field.

10 March 2018
Scorecard

| Prime Doleshwar Sporting Club; 232/9 (50 overs) | v | Abahani Limited; 229 (49.5 overs) |
| Fazle Mahmud 68 (119); Manan Sharma 4/44 (10 overs) | | Mohammad Mithun 60 (61); Farhad Reza 3/42 (10 overs) |

Prime Doleshwar Sporting Club won by 3 runs
Shere Bangla National Stadium, Mirpur
Umpires: Nadir Shah and Mahfuzur Rahman
Player of the match: Farhad Reza (Prime Doleshwar Sporting Club)

- Prime Doleshwar Sporting Club won the toss and elected to bat.
- Sandip Roy (Abahani Limited) made his List A debut.

10 March 2018
Scorecard

| Mohammedan Sporting Club; 306/6 (50 overs) | v | Shinepukur Cricket Club; 268 (48.1 overs) |
| Rony Talukdar 77 (73); Mohammad Saifuddin 3/55 (10 overs) | | Mohammad Saifuddin 68 (75); Mohammad Azim 4/45 (9.1 overs) |

Mohammedan Sporting Club won by 38 runs
Khan Shaheb Osman Ali Stadium, Fatullah
Umpires: Imran Parvez and Gazi Sohel
Player of the match: Saeed Sarkar (Mohammedan Sporting Club)

- Mohammedan Sporting Club won the toss and elected to bat.

12 March 2018
Scorecard

| Sheikh Jamal Dhanmondi Club; 167 (48 overs) | v | Khelaghar Samaj Kallyan Samity; 168/4 (40 overs) |
| Tanbir Hayder 52 (65); Tanvir Islam 4/30 (10 overs) | | Ashok Menaria 58* (71); Sohag Gazi 1/26 (7 overs) |

Khelaghar Samaj Kallyan Samity won by 6 wickets
Shere Bangla National Stadium, Mirpur
Umpires: Mahfuzur Rahman and Gazi Sohel
Player of the match: Tanvir Islam (Khelaghar Samaj Kallyan Samity)

- Khelaghar Samaj Kallyan Samity won the toss and elected to field.

12 March 2018
Scorecard

| Legends of Rupganj; 314/5 (50 overs) | v | Kala Bagan Krira Chakra; 288 (49.5 overs) |
| Salauddin Pappu 125 (95); Taibur Rahman 2/19 (4 overs) | | Shreevats Goswami 75 (102); Asif Hasan 3/43 (10 overs) |

Legends of Rupganj won by 26 runs
Bangladesh Krira Shikkha Protisthan No 3 Ground, Savar
Umpires: Anisur Rahman and Moniruzzaman
Player of the match: Salauddin Pappu (Legends of Rupganj)

- Kala Bagan Krira Chakra won the toss and elected to field.
- Salauddin Pappu (Legends of Rupganj) scored his first century in List A cricket.

12 March 2018
Scorecard

| Brothers Union; 289/6 (50 overs) | v | Agrani Bank Cricket Club; 292/7 (49.1 overs) |
| Mizanur Rahman 102 (120); Shafiul Islam 4/48 (10 overs) | | Rishi Dhawan 70 (59); Sohrawordi Shuvo 3/62 (10 overs) |

Agrani Bank Cricket Club won by 3 wickets
Khan Shaheb Osman Ali Stadium, Fatullah
Umpires: Masudur Rahman and Tanvir Ahmed
Player of the match: Shafiul Islam (Agrani Bank Cricket Club)

- Agrani Bank Cricket Club won the toss and elected to field.
- Shamsul Islam (Agrani Bank Cricket Club) made his List A debut.

==== Round 10 ====
14 March 2018
Scorecard

| Abahani Limited; 113 (26.1 overs) | v | Gazi Group Cricketers; 114/2 (29.5 overs) |
| Manan Sharma 46 (58); Yeasin Arafat 8/40 (8.1 overs) | | Jahurul Islam 52* (78); Mashrafe Mortaza 1/18 (8 overs) |

Gazi Group Cricketers won by 8 wickets
Khan Shaheb Osman Ali Stadium, Fatullah
Umpires: Mahfuzur Rahman and Tanvir Ahmed
Player of the match: Yeasin Arafat (Gazi Group Cricketers)

- Gazi Group Cricketers won the toss and elected to field.
- Yeasin Arafat (Gazi Group Cricketers) became the first Bangladeshi bowler to take eight wickets in a List A match.

14 March 2018
Scorecard

| Agrani Bank Cricket Club; 203/7 (50 overs) | v | Prime Doleshwar Sporting Club; 204/7 (46.2 overs) |
| Shamsul Islam 64* (100); Sharifullah 3/35 (10 overs) | | Farhad Hossain 49 (71); Shafiul Islam 2/25 (10 overs) |

Prime Doleshwar Sporting Club won by 3 wickets
Bangladesh Krira Shikkha Protisthan No 3 Ground, Savar
Umpires: Morshed Ali Khan and Gazi Sohel
Player of the match: Zohaib Khan (Prime Doleshwar Sporting Club)

- Prime Doleshwar Sporting Club won the toss and elected to field.

14 March 2018
Scorecard

| Shinepukur Cricket Club; 251 (49.5 overs) | v | Prime Bank Cricket Club; 252/5 (46.4 overs) |
| Uday Kaul 52 (62); Monir Hossain 3/40 (8.5 overs) | | Nahidul Islam 73* (78); Naeem Islam Jr. 2/49 (9 overs) |

Prime Bank Cricket Club won by 5 wickets
Shere Bangla National Stadium, Mirpur
Umpires: Imran Parvez and Masudur Rahman
Player of the match: Nahidul Islam (Prime Bank Cricket Club)

- Prime Bank Cricket Club won the toss and elected to field.

16 March 2018
Scorecard

| Mohammedan Sporting Club; 181 (45.4 overs) | v | Khelaghar Samaj Kallyan Samity; 182/4 (41.3 overs) |
| Jony Talukdar 55 (90); Tanvir Islam 4/30 (10 overs) | | Amit Majumder 76 (105); Qazi Onik 2/33 (7 overs) |

Khelaghar Samaj Kallyan Samity won by 6 wickets
Shere Bangla National Stadium, Mirpur
Umpires: Tanvir Ahmed and Masudur Rahman
Player of the match: Tanvir Islam (Khelaghar Samaj Kallyan Samity)

- Mohammedan Sporting Club won the toss and elected to bat.

16 March 2018
Scorecard

| Sheikh Jamal Dhanmondi Club; 263 (49.5 overs) | v | Kala Bagan Krira Chakra; 190 (47.3 overs) |
| Tanbir Hayder 61* (60); Abul Hasan 3/45 (10 overs) | | Taibur Rahman 51 (72); Elias Sunny 4/36 (10 overs) |

Sheikh Jamal Dhanmondi Club won by 73 runs
Khan Shaheb Osman Ali Stadium, Fatullah
Umpires: Anisur Rahman and Ali Arman
Player of the match: Rakin Ahmed (Sheikh Jamal Dhanmondi Club)

- Kala Bagan Krira Chakra won the toss and elected to field.
- Riyazul Huda (Kala Bagan Krira Chakra) made his List A debut.

16 March 2018
Scorecard

| Brothers Union; 178 (48.1 overs) | v | Legends of Rupganj; 183/3 (37.3 overs) |
| Mizanur Rahman 63 (58); Asif Hasan 4/23 (10 overs) | | Abdul Mazid 94* (110); Shakhawat Hossain 1/29 (10 overs) |

Legends of Rupganj won by 7 wickets
Bangladesh Krira Shikkha Protisthan No 3 Ground, Savar
Umpires: Gazi Sohel and Nadir Shah
Player of the match: Asif Hasan (Legends of Rupganj)

- Legends of Rupganj won the toss and elected to field.

==== Round 11 ====
18 March 2018
Scorecard

| Prime Doleshwar Sporting Club; 186/9 (50 overs) | v | Gazi Group Cricketers; 189/6 (38.5 overs) |
| Fazle Mahmud 65 (105); Fawad Alam 3/39 (10 overs) | | Mahedi Hasan 59 (53); Zohaib Khan 5/34 (10 overs) |

Gazi Group Cricketers won by 4 wickets
Shere Bangla National Stadium, Mirpur
Umpires: Morshed Ali Khan and Gazi Sohel
Player of the match: Mahedi Hasan (Gazi Group Cricketers)

- Gazi Group Cricketers won the toss and elected to field.

18 March 2018
Scorecard

| Abahani Limited; 335/4 (50 overs) | v | Shinepukur Cricket Club; 279/3 (50 overs) |
| Najmul Hossain Shanto 150* (120); Mohammad Saifuddin 2/50 (10 overs) | | Fardeen Hasan Ony 104* (118); Mashrafe Mortaza 2/35 (8 overs) |

Abahani Limited won by 56 runs
Khan Shaheb Osman Ali Stadium, Fatullah
Umpires: Imran Parvez and Ali Arman
Player of the match: Najmul Hossain Shanto (Abahani Limited)

- Shinepukur Cricket Club won the toss and elected to field.
- Fardeen Hasan Ony (Shinepukur Cricket Club) scored his first century in List A cricket.

18 March 2018
Scorecard

| Prime Bank Cricket Club; 261 (49.5 overs) | v | Khelaghar Samaj Kallyan Samity; 263/8 (50 overs) |
| Al-Amin 94 (96); Saddam Hossain 4/58 (9.5 overs) | | Amit Majumder 71 (99); Shoriful Islam 4/50 (10 overs) |

Khelaghar Samaj Kallyan Samity won by 2 wickets
Bangladesh Krira Shikkha Protisthan No 3 Ground, Savar
Umpires: Tanvir Ahmed and Shafiuddin Ahmed
Player of the match: Amit Majumder (Khelaghar Samaj Kallyan Samity)

- Khelaghar Samaj Kallyan Samity won the toss and elected to field.

20 March 2018
Scorecard

| Kala Bagan Krira Chakra; 260 (47.5 overs) | v | Mohammedan Sporting Club; 263/8 (49.2 overs) |
| Mohammad Ashraful 127 (124); Qazi Onik 6/49 (8.5 overs) | | Mohammad Enamul 57 (79); Sanjit Saha 3/48 (10 overs) |

Mohammedan Sporting Club won by 2 wickets
Bangladesh Krira Shikkha Protisthan No 3 Ground, Savar
Umpires: Mahfuzur Rahman and Shafiuddin Ahmed
Player of the match: Qazi Onik (Mohammedan Sporting Club)

- Kala Bagan Krira Chakra won the toss and elected to bat.

20 March 2018
Scorecard

| Sheikh Jamal Dhanmondi Club; 184 (47.1 overs) | v | Brothers Union; 110 (39.2 overs) |
| Shykat Ali 55 (74); Khaled Ahmed 3/41 (9 overs) | | Myshukur Rahaman 27 (56); Elias Sunny 3/22 (8.2 overs) |

Sheikh Jamal Dhanmondi Club won by 74 runs
Khan Shaheb Osman Ali Stadium, Fatullah
Umpires: Gazi Sohel and Akteruzzaman
Player of the match: Elias Sunny (Sheikh Jamal Dhanmondi Club)

- Brothers Union won the toss and elected to field.

20 March 2018
Scorecard

| Legends of Rupganj; 204/9 (50 overs) | v | Agrani Bank Cricket Club; 210/4 (47.1 overs) |
| Tushar Imran 98 (121); Al-Amin Hossain 4/44 (10 overs) | | Shahriar Nafees 82 (103); Asif Hasan 2/46 (10 overs) |

Agrani Bank Cricket Club won by 6 wickets
Shere Bangla National Stadium, Mirpur
Umpires: Tanvir Ahmed and Ali Arman
Player of the match: Shahriar Nafees (Agrani Bank Cricket Club)

- Agrani Bank Cricket Club won the toss and elected to field.

=== Super League ===
24 March 2018
Scorecard

| Abahani Limited; 278/6 (50 overs) | v | Gazi Group Cricketers; 205 (43 overs) |
| Hanuma Vihari 109 (124); Abu Hider 2/45 (10 overs) | | Anustup Majumdar 64 (80); Sunzamul Islam 4/50 (10 overs) |

Abahani Limited won by 73 runs
Shere Bangla National Stadium, Mirpur
Umpires: Mahfuzur Rahman and Nadir Shah
Player of the match: Hanuma Vihari (Abahani Limited)

- Gazi Group Cricketers won the toss and elected to field.

24 March 2018
Scorecard

| Khelaghar Samaj Kallyan Samity; 258/8 (50 overs) | v | Prime Doleshwar Sporting Club; 259/7 (48.1 overs) |
| Robiul Islam Robi 62 (73); Arafat Sunny 5/45 (10 overs) | | Farhad Reza 68* (37); Saddam Hossain 3/40 (9 overs) |

Prime Doleshwar Sporting Club won by 3 wickets
Khan Shaheb Osman Ali Stadium, Fatullah
Umpires: Morshed Ali Khan and Moniruzzaman
Player of the match: Farhad Reza (Prime Doleshwar Sporting Club)

- Prime Doleshwar Sporting Club won the toss and elected to field.

24 March 2018
Scorecard

| Legends of Rupganj; 260/9 (50 overs) | v | Sheikh Jamal Dhanmondi Club; 262/3 (48 overs) |
| Naeem Islam 51 (66); Robiul Haque 5/33 (7 overs) | | Unmukt Chand 127 (133); Syed Rasel 2/53 (9 overs) |

Sheikh Jamal Dhanmondi Club won by 7 wickets
Bangladesh Krira Shikkha Protisthan No 3 Ground, Savar
Umpires: Shafiuddin Ahmed and Ali Arman
Player of the match: Unmukt Chand (Sheikh Jamal Dhanmondi Club)

- Legends of Rupganj won the toss and elected to bat.

27 March 2018
Scorecard

| Sheikh Jamal Dhanmondi Club; 256/8 (50 overs) | v | Abahani Limited; 230 (47.2 overs) |
| Unmukt Chand 101 (138); Mashrafe Mortaza 3/46 (10 overs) | | Mehidy Hasan Miraz 35 (32); Abu Jayed 3/51 (9 overs) |

Sheikh Jamal Dhanmondi Club won by 26 runs
Khan Shaheb Osman Ali Stadium, Fatullah
Umpires: Tanvir Ahmed and Akteruzzaman
Player of the match: Unmukt Chand (Sheikh Jamal Dhanmondi Club)

- Abahani Limited won the toss and elected to field.

27 March 2018
Scorecard

| Gazi Group Cricketers; 304/6 (50 overs) | v | Khelaghar Samaj Kallyan Samity; 270 (49.3 overs) |
| Sikandar Raza 90 (84); Tanvir Islam 3/43 (10 overs) | | Mahidul Islam Ankon 69 (94); Abu Hider 3/43 (9 overs) |

Gazi Group Cricketers won by 34 runs
Bangladesh Krira Shikkha Protisthan No 3 Ground, Savar
Umpires: Sharfuddoula and Gazi Sohel
Player of the match: Sikandar Raza (Gazi Group Cricketers)

- Khelaghar Samaj Kallyan Samity won the toss and elected to field.
- Nirjan Bhadra (Khelaghar Samaj Kallyan Samity) made his List A debut.

27 March 2018
Scorecard

| Prime Doleshwar Sporting Club; 257/5 (50 overs) | v | Legends of Rupganj; 260/5 (48.4 overs) |
| Litton Das 107 (126); Naeem Islam 2/28 (4 overs) | | Mohammad Naim 88 (101); Farhad Reza 2/54 (9.4 overs) |

Legends of Rupganj won by 5 wickets
Shere Bangla National Stadium, Mirpur
Umpires: Nadir Shah and Masudur Rahman
Player of the match: Mohammad Naim (Legends of Rupganj)

- Legends of Rupganj won the toss and elected to field.

30 March 2018
Scorecard

| Abahani Limited; 393/4 (50 overs) | v | Prime Doleshwar Sporting Club; 244/3 (34.1 overs) |
| Anamul Haque 128 (126); Salauddin Sakil 2/81 (10 overs) | | Marshall Ayub 108* (88); Taskin Ahmed 3/62 (6 overs) |

Abahani Limited won by 20 runs (D/L method)
Bangladesh Krira Shikkha Protisthan No 3 Ground, Savar
Umpires: Nadir Shah and Mahfuzur Rahman
Player of the match: Anamul Haque (Abahani Limited)

- Abahani Limited won the toss and elected to bat.
- Abahani Limited scored the highest total in List A cricket in Bangladesh.

30 March 2018
Scorecard

| Legends of Rupganj; 216/8 (50 overs) | v | Khelaghar Samaj Kallyan Samity; 204 (48.5 overs) |
| Nazmul Hossain Milon 63* (66); Saddam Hossain 3/39 (10 overs) | | Mahidul Islam Ankon 77 (105); Asif Hasan 2/36 (8.5 overs) |

Legends of Rupganj won by 12 runs
Khan Shaheb Osman Ali Stadium, Fatullah
Umpires: Gazi Sohel and Masudur Rahman
Player of the match: Nazmul Hossain Milon (Legends of Rupganj)

- Khelaghar Samaj Kallyan Samity won the toss and elected to field.

30 March 2018
Scorecard

| Sheikh Jamal Dhanmondi Club; 248 (47.4 overs) | v | Gazi Group Cricketers; 217/7 (47 overs) |
| Ziaur Rahman 86 (74); Abu Hider 4/57 (8.4 overs) | | Jaker Ali 61 (78); Robiul Haque 3/27 (7 overs) |

Sheikh Jamal Dhanmondi Club won by 8 runs (D/L method)
Shere Bangla National Stadium, Mirpur
Umpires: Morshed Ali Khan and Sharfuddoula
Player of the match: Ziaur Rahman (Sheikh Jamal Dhanmondi Club)

- Gazi Group Cricketers won the toss and elected to field.

2 April 2018
Scorecard

| Abahani Limited; 241 (46.3 overs) | v | Khelaghar Samaj Kallyan Samity; 114 (27.3 overs) |
| Najmul Hossain Shanto 54 (56); Abdul Halim 4/10 (5 overs) | | Mahidul Islam Ankon 27 (32); Mashrafe Mortaza 3/32 (8 overs) |

Abahani Limited won by 127 runs
Shere Bangla National Stadium, Mirpur
Umpires: Ali Arman and Masudur Rahman
Player of the match: Mehidy Hasan (Abahani Limited)

- Khelaghar Samaj Kallyan Samity won the toss and elected to field.
- Sabbir and Irfan Ahmed (Khelaghar Samaj Kallyan Samity) both made their List A debuts.

2 April 2018
Scorecard

| Gazi Group Cricketers; 152 (45.4 overs) | v | Legends of Rupganj; 153/2 (22.5 overs) |
| Jahurul Islam 31 (49); Mohammad Shahid 4/26 (10 overs) | | Avishek Mitra 57* (61); Tipu Sultan 1/22 (5 overs) |

Legends of Rupganj won by 8 wickets
Khan Shaheb Osman Ali Stadium, Fatullah
Umpires: Nadir Shah and Sharfuddoula
Player of the match: Mohammad Shahid (Legends of Rupganj)

- Legends of Rupganj won the toss and elected to field.

2 April 2018
Scorecard

| Sheikh Jamal Dhanmondi Club; 183 (38 overs) | v | Prime Doleshwar Sporting Club; 173 (48.2 overs) |
| Tanbir Hayder 43* (70); Zakaria Masud 3/10 (4 overs) | | Arafat Sunny 35* (52); Tanbir Hayder 4/31 (10 overs) |

Sheikh Jamal Dhanmondi Club won by 10 runs
Bangladesh Krira Shikkha Protisthan No 3 Ground, Savar
Umpires: Tanvir Ahmed and Mohammad Wahid
Player of the match: Tanbir Hayder (Sheikh Jamal Dhanmondi Club)

- Sheikh Jamal Dhanmondi Club won the toss and elected to bat.

5 April 2018
Scorecard

| Abahani Limited; 374/6 (50 overs) | v | Legends of Rupganj; 280 (42.4 overs) |
| Nasir Hossain 129 (91); Parvez Rasool 3/42 (10 overs) | | Naeem Islam 76 (68); Mehidy Hasan Miraz 2/29 (5 overs) |

Abahani Limited won by 94 runs
Bangladesh Krira Shikkha Protisthan No 3 Ground, Savar
Umpires: Nadir Shah and Rezwan Parvez
Player of the match: Nasir Hossain (Abahani Limited)

- Legends of Rupganj won the toss and elected to field.

5 April 2018
Scorecard

| Sheikh Jamal Dhanmondi Club; 160 (49 overs) | v | Khelaghar Samaj Kallyan Samity; 161/6 (36.5 overs) |
| Nurul Hasan 47 (55); Saddam Hossain 2/18 (4 overs) | | Nazimuddin 61 (82); Nazmul Islam 5/32 (9.5 overs) |

Khelaghar Samaj Kallyan Samity won by 4 wickets
Shere Bangla National Stadium, Mirpur
Umpires: Abdullah Al Matin and Rafiqul Islam
Player of the match: Nazmul Islam (Sheikh Jamal Dhanmondi Club)

- Khelaghar Samaj Kallyan Samity won the toss and elected to field.

5 April 2018
Scorecard

| Gazi Group Cricketers; 95 (21.4 overs) | v | Prime Doleshwar Sporting Club; 99/5 (24 overs) |
| Mahedi Hasan 39 (33); Nasum Ahmed 4/10 (3.4 overs) | | Abu Sayeem 36 (32); Abu Hider 3/27 (6 overs) |

Prime Doleshwar Sporting Club won by 5 wickets
Khan Shaheb Osman Ali Stadium, Fatullah
Umpires: Shafiuddin Ahmed and Swakat Ali
Player of the match: Nasum Ahmed (Prime Doleshwar Sporting Club)

- Prime Doleshwar Sporting Club won the toss and elected to field.

=== Relegation League ===
29 March 2018
Scorecard

| Kala Bagan Krira Chakra; 246/5 (50 overs) | v | Agrani Bank Cricket Club; 250/4 (45.5 overs) |
| Mohammad Ashraful 103* (137); Soumya Sarkar 2/46 (7 overs) | | Shahriar Nafees 109 (142); Mohammad Ashraful 2/38 (8 overs) |

Agrani Bank Cricket Club won by 6 wickets
Bangladesh Krira Shikkha Protisthan No 4 Ground, Savar
Umpires: Mohammad Kamruzzaman and Mozahiduzzaman
Player of the match: Shahriar Nafees (Agrani Bank Cricket Club)

- Kala Bagan Krira Chakra won the toss and elected to bat.
- Asir Intesar and Jaimul Hasan (Kala Bagan Krira Chakra) both made their List A debuts.

1 April 2018
Scorecard

| Kala Bagan Krira Chakra; 252/3 (50 overs) | v | Brothers Union; 253/4 (44.3 overs) |
| Mohammad Ashraful 102* (137); Sohrawordi Shuvo 2/53 (10 overs) | | Mizanur Rahman 115 (104); Jaimul Hasan 3/47 (8 overs) |

Brothers Union won by 6 wickets
Bangladesh Krira Shikkha Protisthan No 4 Ground, Savar
Umpires: Shafiuddin Ahmed and Gazi Sohel
Player of the match: Mizanur Rahman (Brothers Union)

- Kala Bagan Krira Chakra won the toss and elected to bat.
- Faysal Ahmed (Kala Bagan Krira Chakra) made his List A debut.

4 April 2018
Scorecard

| Agrani Bank Cricket Club; 334 (49.1 overs) | v | Brothers Union; 335/6 (50 overs) |
| Soumya Sarkar 154 (127); Shakhawat Hossain 3/43 (10 overs) | | Junaid Siddique 83 (77); Rishi Dhawan 3/71 (9 overs) |

Brothers Union won by 4 wickets
Bangladesh Krira Shikkha Protisthan No 3 Ground, Savar
Umpires: Habibur Rahman and Rafiqul Islam John
Player of the match: Soumya Sarkar (Agrani Bank Cricket Club)

- Brothers Union won the toss and elected to field.
