= 2018–19 National Cricket League =

Cricket tournament

- Dates: 1 October – 8 November 2018
- Administrator: Bangladesh Cricket Board
- Cricket format: First-class
- Tournament format: Double round-robin
- Champions: Rajshahi Division (6th title)
- Participants: 8
- Matches: 24
- Most runs: Shadman Islam (648)
- Most wickets: Nayeem Hasan (28)

The 2018–19 National Cricket League was the twentieth edition of the National Cricket League (NCL), a first-class cricket competition that was held in Bangladesh. The tournament started on 1 October 2018, with eight teams placed into two tiers. Khulna Division were the defending champions.

The opening round of matches saw a total of thirteen centuries made by twelve different batsman, the first time this had happened at the start of a cricket tournament in Bangladesh. Round four of the tournament produced the two narrowest victories in the history of the NCL, with Sylhet Division winning their match against Dhaka Metropolis by three runs, and Rangpur Division beating Barisal Division by five runs.

Rajshahi Division won the tournament, to claim their sixth title in the competition, after beating Barisal Division by six wickets in the final round of matches. In Tier 2, Dhaka Division were promoted for the next season.

== Fixtures ==
=== Tier 1 ===
Points table

Team	Pld	W	L	D	A	Pts
Rajshahi Division	6	2	0	4	0	34.81
Rangpur Division	6	1	0	5	0	24.59
Khulna Division	6	1	0	4	1	16.15
Barisal Division	6	0	2	3	1	14.61

- 2018–19 Champions
- Bottom placed team relegated to Tier 2 for 2019–20 National Cricket League.

1–4 October 2018
Scorecard

Rangpur Division	v	Barisal Division
502 (145.2 overs); Ariful Haque 231 (325); Monir Hossain 3/128 (47.2 overs)		458 (145.2 overs); Fazle Mahmud 195 (424); Mahmudul Hasan 4/71 (25.2 overs)
164/2 (54.2 overs); Naeem Islam 100* (162); Kamrul Islam Rabbi 1/12 (6 overs)

Match drawn
Shaheed Chandu Stadium, Bogra
Umpires: Mozahiduzzaman and Sohrab Hossain
Player of the match: Ariful Haque (Rangpur Division)

- Barisal Division won the toss and elected to field.
- Ariful Haque (Rangpur Division) scored his maiden double-century in first-class cricket.

1–4 October 2018
Scorecard

Khulna Division	v	Rajshahi Division
210 (52.3 overs); Tushar Imran 104 (144); Shafiul Islam 5/43 (12 overs)		552 (147 overs); Jahurul Islam 163* (290); Afif Hossain 7/66 (21 overs)
467/7 (128.5 overs); Tushar Imran 159 (229); Sunzamul Islam 2/129 (40 overs)

Match drawn
Shahid Kamruzzaman Stadium, Rajshahi
Umpires: Akteruzzaman and Manjurul Islam
Player of the match: Tushar Imran (Khulna Division)

- Khulna Division won the toss and elected to bat.

8–11 October 2018
Scorecard

Barisal Division	v	Khulna Division
299 (102.2 overs); Nuruzzaman 74 (150); Al-Amin Hossain 3/67 (25 overs)		349/7d (116.1 overs); Ziaur Rahman 112 (246); Kamrul Islam Rabbi 2/44 (16 overs)

Match drawn
Sheikh Abu Naser Stadium, Khulna
Umpires: Imran Parvez and Mahfuzur Rahman
Player of the match: Ziaur Rahman (Khulna Division)

- Khulna Division won the toss and elected to field.
- No play was possible on day 4 due to rain

8–11 October 2018
Scorecard

Rangpur Division	v	Rajshahi Division
151 (59.4 overs); Naeem Islam 60 (142); Mohor Sheikh 3/37 (13.4 overs)		589/4d (150 overs); Najmul Hossain Shanto 173 (313); Sajedul Islam 1/78 (18 overs)
319/2 (49 overs); Litton Das 203 (142); Shafiqul Islam 1/60 (8 overs)

Match drawn
Shahid Kamruzzaman Stadium, Rajshahi
Umpires: Ali Arman and Nadir Shah
Player of the match: Litton Das (Rangpur Division)

- Rajshahi Division won the toss and elected to field.
- Mohor Sheikh and Shafiqul Islam (Rajshahi Division) both made their first-class debuts.

15–18 October 2018
Scorecard

Khulna Division	v	Rangpur Division
304 (94.1 overs); Soumya Sarkar 76 (141); Sajedul Islam 6/81 (22.1 overs)		315 (114 overs); Tanbir Hayder 67* (117); Soumya Sarkar 5/61 (24 overs)
334/9d (100.4 overs); Tushar Imran 103 (176); Mahmudul Hasan 4/29 (10 overs)		91/1 (23 overs); Jahid Javed 64* (66); Al-Amin Hossain 1/18 (5 overs)

Match drawn
Sheikh Abu Naser Stadium, Khulna
Umpires: Tanvir Ahmed and Gazi Sohel
Player of the match: Soumya Sarkar (Khulna Division)

- Rangpur Division won the toss and elected to field.
- Soumya Sarkar (Khulna Division) took his first five-wicket haul in first-class cricket.
- Tushar Imran (Khulna Division) became the first batsman to score seven centuries in the same year in domestic cricket in Bangladesh.

15–18 October 2018
Scorecard

Barisal Division	v	Rajshahi Division
133 (46 overs); Nuruzzaman 38 (74); Farhad Reza 4/30 (16 overs)		155 (43.4 overs); Muktar Ali 59* (70); Sohag Gazi 3/41 (10 overs)
229/7 (75 overs); Shahriar Nafees 102 (161); Sabbir Rahman 3/19 (10 overs)

Match drawn
Abdur Rab Serniabad Stadium, Barisal
Umpires: Morshed Ali Khan and Mahfuzur Rahman
Player of the match: Muktar Ali (Rajshahi Division)

- Rajshahi Division won the toss and elected to field.
- No play was possible on days 1 and 2 due to a wet outfield.
- Abdul Gaffar (Rajshahi Division) made his first-class debut.

22–25 October 2018
Scorecard

Rangpur Division	v	Barisal Division
147 (74 overs); Rakin Ahmed 46 (152); Sohag Gazi 5/40 (18 overs)		147 (50 overs); Rafsan Al Mahmud 40 (73); Subashis Roy 5/49 (20 overs)
229 (104.5 overs); Mahmudul Hasan 67 (180); Monir Hossain 5/24 (23 overs)		224 (80.2 overs); Al-Amin 52 (108); Robiul Haque 4/63 (25.2 overs)

Rangpur Division won by 5 runs
Cricket Garden, Rangpur
Umpires: Shafiuddin Ahmed and Mahfuzur Rahman
Player of the match: Subashis Roy (Rangpur Division)

- Barisal Division won the toss and elected to field.
- Rakin Ahmed (Rangpur Division) made his first-class debut.
- Sohag Gazi (Barisal Division) took his 21st five-wicket haul in first-class cricket.

22–25 October 2018
Scorecard

Khulna Division	v	Rajshahi Division
309 (91 overs); Tushar Imran 71 (127); Farhad Reza 3/54 (16 overs)		431 (155.3 overs); Sabbir Rahman 99 (169); Soumya Sarkar 2/56 (20 overs)
158 (61 overs); Nahidul Islam 30* (69); Farhad Reza 4/26 (16 overs)		37/2 (4.4 overs); Mizanur Rahman 7 (7); Al-Amin Hossain 2/17 (2.4 overs)

Rajshahi Division won by 8 wickets
Sheikh Abu Naser Stadium, Khulna
Umpires: Tanvir Ahmed and Gazi Sohel
Player of the match: Farhad Reza (Rajshahi Division)

- Khulna Division won the toss and elected to bat.

29 October–1 November 2018
Scorecard

Barisal Division	v	Khulna Division

Match abandoned
Abdur Rab Serniabad Stadium, Barisal
Umpires: Tanvir Ahmed and Akteruzzaman

- No toss.
- No play was possible due to rain.

29 October–1 November 2018
Scorecard

Rangpur Division	v	Rajshahi Division
336 (133.3 overs); Naeem Islam 89 (268); Sunzamul Islam 7/69 (41.3 overs)		248 (117.1 overs); Farhad Hossain 71 (201); Robiul Haque 4/62 (26 overs)
186/8d (37 overs); Dhiman Ghosh 51 (45); Delwar Hossain 4/27 (5 overs)		133/2 (45 overs); Sabbir Hossain 66* (121); Subashis Roy 2/6 (8 overs)

Match drawn
Cricket Garden, Rangpur
Umpires: Shafiuddin Ahmed and Sohrab Hossain
Player of the match: Sunzamul Islam (Rajshahi Division)

- Rajshahi Division won the toss and elected to field.
- Fardeen Hasan Oney (Rangpur Division) made his first-class debut.

5–8 November 2018
Scorecard

Khulna Division	v	Rangpur Division
261 (96 overs); Moinul Islam 54 (141); Tanbir Hayder 3/14 (7 overs)		249/8d (95.2 overs); Dhiman Ghosh 50* (65); Abdur Razzak 4/62 (21 overs)
282 (66.3 overs); Soumya Sarkar 83 (111); Tanbir Hayder 3/40 (7.3 overs)		184/6 (51 overs); Rakin Ahmed 74 (109); Mahedi Hasan 3/17 (8 overs)

Match drawn
Shaheed Chandu Stadium, Bogra
Umpires: Moniruzzaman and Gazi Sohel
Player of the match: Moinul Islam (Khulna Division)

- Rangpur Division won the toss and elected to field.

5–8 November 2018
Scorecard

Barisal Division	v	Rajshahi Division
97 (38.2 overs); Al-Amin 25 (58); Mohor Sheikh 5/24 (13.2 overs)		160 (54 overs); Junaid Siddique 78 (145); Monir Hossain 5/14 (11 overs)
346 (105.3 overs); Al-Amin 97 (131); Farhad Reza 4/59 (21.3 overs)		284/4 (76 overs); Junaid Siddique 120* (181); Tanvir Islam 2/61 (18 overs)

Rajshahi Division won by 6 wickets
Shahid Kamruzzaman Stadium, Rajshahi
Umpires: Morshed Ali Khan and Nadir Shah
Player of the match: Junaid Siddique (Rajshahi Division)

- Rajshahi Division won the toss and elected to field.
- Monir Hossain (Barisal Division) took a hat-trick in the first innings.

=== Tier 2 ===
Points table

Team	Pld	W	L	D	A	Pts
Dhaka Division	6	2	1	3	0	29.35
Dhaka Metropolis	6	1	2	3	0	25.13
Chittagong Division	6	1	1	4	0	21.11
Sylhet Division	6	1	1	4	0	20.12

- Top placed team promoted to Tier 1 for 2019–20 National Cricket League.

1–4 October 2018
Scorecard

Dhaka Division	v	Chittagong Division
238 (81 overs); Taibur Rahman 63 (93); Jubair Hossain 5/61 (16 overs)		142 (53.4 overs); Sadiqur Rahman 30 (26); Shahadat Hossain 4/62 (15 overs)
385/1d (92 overs); Rony Talukdar 228* (252); Jubair Hossain 1/68 (15 overs)		267 (85.1 overs); Mominul Haque 62 (67); Nazmul Islam 5/75 (27 overs)

Dhaka Division won by 214 runs
Khan Shaheb Osman Ali Stadium, Fatullah
Umpires: Asadur Rahman and Habibur Rahman
Player of the match: Rony Talukdar (Dhaka Division)

- Chittagong Division won the toss and elected to field.
- Mahidul Islam Ankon, Ifran Hossain (Chittagong Division) and Mahbubul Alam Anik (Dhaka Division) all made their first-class debuts.
- Rony Talukdar and Abdul Mazid (Dhaka Division) made the highest opening partnership in first-class cricket in Bangladesh (350 runs).

1–4 October 2018
Scorecard

Dhaka Metropolis	v	Sylhet Division
426 (122.4 overs); Shadman Islam 157 (238); Enamul Haque 6/165 (53.4 overs)		215 (82 overs); Enamul Haque 91 (198); Arafat Sunny 4/62 (26 overs)
		170 (72.4 overs) (f/o); Zakir Hasan 72 (129); Asif Hossain 5/44 (24 overs)

Dhaka Metropolis won by an innings and 41 runs
Sylhet International Cricket Stadium, Sylhet
Umpires: Nadir Shah and Swakat Ali
Player of the match: Shadman Islam (Dhaka Metropolis)

- Sylhet Division won the toss and elected to field.
- Qazi Onik (Dhaka Metropolis) made his first-class debut.

8–11 October 2018
Scorecard

Chittagong Division	v	Sylhet Division
282/9 (87 overs); Sadikur Rahman 106 (190); Shahanur Rahman 3/58 (19 overs)

Match drawn
Sheikh Kamal International Cricket Stadium, Cox's Bazar
Umpires: Shafiuddin Ahmed and Shyful Islam

- Chittagong Division won the toss and elected to bat.
- No play was possible on days 2, 3 and 4 due to rain.
- Towfiq Khan (Sylhet Division) made his first-class debut.

8–11 October 2018
Scorecard

Dhaka Division	v	Dhaka Metropolis
206 (75 overs); Taibur Rahman 88 (122); Arafat Sunny 7/57 (24 overs)		387 (139.3 overs); Shadman Islam 189 (326); Salauddin Sakil 4/80 (26.3 overs)
50/2 (14.5 overs); Saif Hassan 27* (34); Arafat Sunny 1/8 (2.5 overs)

Match drawn
Khan Shaheb Osman Ali Stadium, Fatullah
Umpires: Akteruzzaman and Moniruzzaman
Player of the match: Shadman Islam (Dhaka Metropolis)

- Dhaka Metropolis won the toss and elected to field.
- No play was possible on day 4 due to rain.
- Shakil Hossain (Dhaka Division) made his first-class debut.

15–18 October 2018
Scorecard

Sylhet Division	v	Dhaka Division
355/9d (137.2 overs); Rajin Saleh 96 (243); Taibur Rahman 4/78 (31.2 overs)		55/3 (27 overs); Saif Hassan 22 (58); Enamul Haque 2/7 (6 overs)

Match drawn
Sheikh Kamal International Cricket Stadium Academy Ground, Cox's Bazar
Umpires: Shyful Islam and Sohrab Hossain

- Dhaka Division won the toss and elected to field.
- No play was possible on days 1 and 2 due to a wet outfield.

15–18 October 2018
Scorecard

Dhaka Metropolis	v	Chittagong Division
287 (104.5 overs); Zabid Hossain 90 (183); Nayeem Hasan 3/74 (36 overs)		236 (92 overs); Tasamul Haque 116 (185); Taskin Ahmed 5/67 (20.3 overs)
254/7d (90 overs); Shadman Islam 62 (88); Nayeem Hasan 6/119 (44 overs)		159/3 (54 overs); Pinak Ghosh 59* (164); Arafat Sunny 2/77 (22 overs)

Match drawn
Shaheed Chandu Stadium, Bogra
Umpires: Imran Parvez and Nadir Shah
Player of the match: Nayeem Hasan (Chittagong Division)

- Chittagong Division won the toss and elected to field.
- Mohammad Naim (Dhaka Metropolis) made his first-class debut.
- Nayeem Hasan (Chittagong Division) and Taskin Ahmed (Dhaka Metropolis) both took their first five-wicket hauls in first-class cricket.

22–25 October 2018
Scorecard

Dhaka Division	v	Chittagong Division
288 (88 overs); Abdul Mazid 72 (134); Nayeem Hasan 8/106 (35 overs)		238 (100.1 overs); Yasir Ali 60 (110); Mosharraf Hossain 3/63 (29 overs)
151 (47 overs); Nazmul Hossain Milon 39 (48); Ifran Hossain 3/28 (12 overs)		205/2 (42.4 overs); Mominul Haque 111* (115); Salauddin Sakil 1/12 (3 overs)

Chittagong Division won by 8 wickets
Sheikh Kamal International Cricket Stadium, Cox's Bazar
Umpires: Mozahiduzzaman and Habibur Rahman
Player of the match: Nayeem Hasan (Chittagong Division)

- Dhaka Division won the toss and elected to bat.
- This was Chittagong Division's first win in first-class cricket in four-and-a-half years.

22–25 October 2018
Scorecard

Sylhet Division	v	Dhaka Metropolis
312 (98 overs); Shanaj Ahmed 60 (110); Asif Hossain 2/43 (15 overs)		300 (87 overs); Marshall Ayub 74 (147); Khaled Ahmed 5/85 (21 overs)
184 (63.2 overs); Enamul Haque 36 (72); Qazi Onik 5/57 (14.2 overs)		193 (48.2 overs); Shadman Islam 78 (92); Khaled Ahmed 5/54 (14.2 overs)

Sylhet Division won by 3 runs
Shahid Kamruzzaman Stadium, Rajshahi
Umpires: Imran Parvez and Moniruzzaman
Player of the match: Khaled Ahmed (Sylhet Division)

- Dhaka Metropolis won the toss and elected to field.
- Khaled Ahmed (Sylhet Division) took his maiden ten-wicket haul in first-class cricket.

29 October–1 November 2018
Scorecard

Dhaka Metropolis	v	Dhaka Division
59/8d (29.3 overs); Mohammad Ashraful 14 (30); Salauddin Sakil 4/15 (12 overs)		386 (113.2 overs); Shuvagata Hom 106 (146); Shykat Ali 4/21 (12 overs)
166 (55.2 overs); Shadman Islam 66 (136); Taibur Rahman 4/31 (10.2 overs)

Dhaka Division won by an innings and 161 runs
Khan Shaheb Osman Ali Stadium, Fatullah
Umpires: Mahfuzur Rahman and Nadir Shah
Player of the match: Shuvagata Hom (Dhaka Division)

- Dhaka Division won the toss and elected to field.
- Sumon Khan (Dhaka Division) made his first-class debut.

29 October–1 November 2018
Scorecard

Sylhet Division	v	Chittagong Division
26/1 (13 overs); Shahanur Rahman 16* (39); Ifran Hossain 1/6 (4 overs)

Match drawn
Sheikh Kamal International Cricket Stadium Academy Ground, Cox's Bazar
Umpires: Imran Parvez and Mozahiduzzaman

- Sylhet Division won the toss and elected to bat.
- No play was possible on days 1, 2 and 3 due to rain.
- Muminul Islam and Ruyel Miah (Sylhet Division) both made their first-class debuts.

5–8 November 2018
Scorecard

Sylhet Division	v	Dhaka Division
238 (100 overs); Rajin Saleh 67 (201); Shahadat Hossain 3/64 (19.4 overs)		346 (114.5 overs); Abdul Mazid 104 (217); Enamul Haque 5/87 (33 overs)
303/6 (124 overs); Rajin Saleh 87 (224); Shahadat Hossain 2/43 (16.5 overs)

Match drawn
Sheikh Kamal International Cricket Stadium Academy Ground, Cox's Bazar
Umpires: Tanvir Ahmed and Mahfuzur Rahman
Player of the match: Rajin Saleh (Sylhet Division)

- Sylhet Division won the toss and elected to bat.
- Enamul Haque (Sylhet Division) took a hat-trick.

5–8 November 2018
Scorecard

Dhaka Metropolis	v	Chittagong Division
328 (108.1 overs); Marshall Ayub 110 (214); Nayeem Hasan 4/98 (34.1 overs)		345 (113.2 overs); Sadikur Rahman 101 (191); Abu Hider 4/97 (27 overs)
261/6d (62 overs); Shamsur Rahman 121 (173); Shakhawat Hossain 2/75 (17 overs)		142/4 (41 overs); Irfan Sukkur 44 (62); Asif Hossain 2/29 (10 overs)

Match drawn
Sheikh Kamal International Cricket Stadium, Cox's Bazar
Umpires: Shafiuddin Ahmed and Akteruzzaman
Player of the match: Shamsur Rahman (Dhaka Metropolis)

- Dhaka Metropolis won the toss and elected to bat.
- Azmir Ahmed (Dhaka Metropolis) made his first-class debut.

== Venues ==
Locations of the 2018–19 National Cricket League venues
