= Fardeen Hasan Ony =

Bangladeshi cricketer (born 1997)

Personal information
- Full name: Fardeen Hasan Ony
- Born: 27 November 1997 (age 28); Narail, Bangladesh
- Batting: Left-handed
- Role: Wicketkeeper
- Source: Cricinfo, 5 February 2018

Fardeen Hasan Ony (born 27 November 1997) is a Bangladeshi cricketer. He made his List A debut for Shinepukur Cricket Club in the 2017–18 Dhaka Premier Division Cricket League on 5 February 2018. On 18 March 2018, batting for Shinepukur Cricket Club against Abahani Limited in the 2017–18 Dhaka Premier Division Cricket League, he scored his first century in List A cricket. He made his first-class debut for Rangpur Division in the 2018–19 National Cricket League on 29 October 2018. He made his Twenty20 debut for Sheikh Jamal Dhanmondi Club in the 2018–19 Dhaka Premier Division Twenty20 Cricket League on 25 February 2019, when he played as an opener against Khelaghar. In November 2019, he was selected to play for the Cumilla Warriors in the 2019–20 Bangladesh Premier League.
