= Mohammad Rakib =

Bangladeshi cricketer (born 1998)

Personal information
- Born: 8 December 1998 (age 27)

Domestic team information
- Years: Team
- 2017: Abahani Limited

Mohammad Rakib (born 8 December 1998) is a Bangladeshi cricketer, who plays as a middle-order batsman. He made his List A debut for Abahani Limited in the 2017–18 Dhaka Premier Division Cricket League on 2 March 2018. He made his Twenty20 debut for Shinepukur Cricket Club in the 2018–19 Dhaka Premier Division Twenty20 Cricket League on 25 February 2019. Prior to his List A debut, he was named in Bangladesh's squad for the 2018 Under-19 Cricket World Cup.
