= Faysal Ahmed (cricketer) =

Bangladeshi cricketer

Personal information
- Full name: Faysal Ahmed
- Source: ESPNcricinfo, 4 December 2020

Faysal Ahmed is a Bangladeshi cricketer. He made his List A debut for Kala Bagan Krira Chakra in the 2017–18 Dhaka Premier Division Cricket League on 1 April 2018.
