= Asif Hasan =

Bangladeshi cricketer (born 1993)

Mohammad Asif Hasan (born 24 July 1993, in Dhaka), also known by his nickname Mitul, is a Bangladeshi first-class, List A and Twenty20 cricketer since the 2014–15 Bangladeshi cricket season. Asif is a right-handed batsman and a left-arm orthodox spin bowler. He is currently (July 2016) playing for Dhaka Metropolis.

In February 2018, he took a hat-trick, bowling for Legends of Rupganj against Sheikh Jamal Dhanmondi Club in the 2017–18 Dhaka Premier Division Cricket League.

In October 2018, he was named in the squad for the Dhaka Dynamites team, following the draft for the 2018–19 Bangladesh Premier League.
