= Uday Kaul =

Indian cricketer (born 1987)

Personal information
- Born: 2 December 1987 (age 38); Kangra, Himachal Pradesh, India
- Batting: Left-handed
- Role: Wicket-keeper
- Relatives: Siddarth Kaul (brother)

Domestic team information
- Years: Team
- 2005–2019: Punjab
- 2008–2009: Kings XI Punjab
- 2019–present: Chandigarh

Career statistics
Competition	FC	LA	T20
Matches	107	74	16
Runs scored	7,024	2,597	169
Batting average	49.11	45.56	28.16
100s/50s	19/35	7/16	0/1
Top score	212*	137	69
Catches/stumpings	201/17	68/12	6/3
- Source: ESPNcricinfo, 30 April 2024

Uday Kaul (born 2 December 1987) is an Indian cricketer. He is a wicketkeeper-batsman who played for Punjab, Chandigarh and Mizoram in the domestic cricket. He was a part of Kings XI Punjab IPL team in 2008 and 2009. He has also played for India Under-19 cricket team in 2006. His brother Siddarth Kaul also played for Punjab. His father, Tej Kaul, played across three seasons in the 1970s for Jammu and Kashmir.

Kaul made his first-class debut for Punjab at the age of 18 against Hyderabad in 2005. He has been their first-choice wicket-keeper ever since in the longer versions of the game. He bats in the higher middle-order for Punjab and has been a prolific run-getter over the years. He leads Punjab in the absence of their skipper Harbhajan Singh. Kaul has been a regular feature in the North Zone squad in Duleep Trophy.

Kaul made his debut as a specialist batsman in December 2006 against Jammu & Kashmir, who also fielded a promising debutant Akshay Karawal whose career was cut short by a serious knee injury in the first innings. Batting at 7, he scored 32 as Punjab went on to win by an innings and 151 runs. In the 2007–08 Ranji season, Kaul made 503 runs from 10 innings at an average of 62.87 with two hundreds. In the 2008–09 season, he scored 547 runs from 10 innings at an average of 68.37 with two hundreds and three fifties. In the 2009–10 Ranji season, he scored 582 runs in 8 matches with five fifties and a hundred, averaging 45. In the quarterfinal against Karnataka, he scored 68 and 86. The match was drawn and Karnataka qualified for the semifinals by virtue of their first-innings lead. In the 2010–11 season, Kaul made 561 runs from 11 innings, averaging 56.10 with one century and four fifties. In 2011–12, he continued his consistent batting display by scoring 478 runs from 11 innings with two hundreds and two fifties. In 2012–13 Ranji Trophy, Kaul amassed 652 runs from 10 matches, averaging more than 65. He struck three centuries in that season including an unbeaten 113 against Jharkhand in the quarterfinal. His consistent form earned him a place in the India A squad in October 2013 against West Indies A. He made an unbeaten 63 in the first match.

In 2012, he also played for Prime Bank Cricket Club (Old DOHS) in the Dhaka Premier League. He scored 221 runs in three innings including a hundred and two fifties. He was the leading run-scorer for Shinepukur Cricket Club in the 2017–18 Dhaka Premier Division Cricket League, with 478 runs in 9 matches.

After his playing career, he moved to coaching and worked with Punjab's men's domestic team.
