= Fazle =

Fazle may refer to:

- Fazle Hasan Abed, KCMG (1936–2019), Bangladeshi social worker, founder and chairman of BRAC
- Molla Fazle Akbar, three-star rank Bangladesh Army officer
- Fazle Hossain Badsha (born 1952), Bangladeshi politician
- A.B.M. Fazle Karim Chowdhury (born 1954), Bangladesh Awami League Member of Parliament
- Fazle Haq (1928–1991), Pakistan Army general, martial law administrator of Khyber-Pakhtunkhwa province
- Fazle Hussain (born 1943), Professor of Mechanical Engineering and Physics
- Fazle Kabir (born 1955), Bangladeshi economist and banker
- Fazle Shakoor Khan (born 1976), Pakistani politician from Charsadda
- Fazle Lohani (1929–1985), Bangladeshi journalist, television host, songwriter and film producer
- Fazle Mahmud (born 1987), first-class and List A cricketer from Bangladesh
- Fazle Rabbi Miah (born 1946), Bangladesh Awami League Member of Parliament, deputy speaker of the Bangladeshi parliament
- Fazle Kaderi Mohammad Abdul Munim (1924–2001), 4th Chief Justice of Bangladesh, chief of Bangladesh Law Commission
- Mohammed Fazle Rabbee (1932–1971), cardiologist and a published medical researcher
- Fazle Rabby (born 1997), Bangladeshi cricketer
- Sheikh Fazle Noor Taposh (born 1971), Bangladeshi politician
- TIM Fazle Rabbi Chowdhury, six-time MP and former leader of the Jatiya Party (Zafar)

== See also ==
- Fazle Omar Mosque in Hamburg, the second purpose-built mosque in Germany
- Fazl
- Fazleh
