= Shakil Hossain =

Bangladeshi cricketer (born 2000)

Personal information
- Born: 22 April 2000 (age 26)
- Batting: Right-handed
- Role: Wicket-keeper batsman
- Source: Cricinfo, 13 August 2021

Shakil Hossain (born 22 April 2000) is a Bangladeshi cricketer who plays as a wicket-keeper batsman. He made his List A debut for Brothers Union in the 2017–18 Dhaka Premier Division Cricket League on 17 February 2018. Prior to his List A debut, he was part of Bangladesh's squad for the 2018 Under-19 Cricket World Cup. He made his Twenty20 debut for Abahani Limited in the 2018–19 Dhaka Premier Division Twenty20 Cricket League on 25 February 2019. He made his first-class debut for Dhaka Division in the 2019–20 National Cricket League on 10 October 2019.
