= Mohammad Ishak =

Bangladeshi cricketer

Personal information
- Full name: Mohammad Ishak
- Source: ESPNcricinfo, 4 December 2020

Mohammad Ishak is a Bangladeshi cricketer. He made his List A debut for Agrani Bank Cricket Club in the 2017–18 Dhaka Premier Division Cricket League on 19 February 2018.
