= Tipu Sultan (cricketer) =

Bangladeshi cricketer (born 1998)

Personal information
- Full name: Mohammad Tipu Sultan
- Born: 17 December 1998 (age 27); Jessore, Khulna, Bangladesh
- Batting: Left-handed
- Bowling: Slow left-arm orthodox
- Role: All-rounder

Domestic team information
- Years: Team
- 2018: Gazi Group Cricketers (squad no. 21)
- 2019: Shinepukur Cricket Club (squad no. 21)
- Source: ESPNcricinfo, 5 September 2019

Tipu Sultan (born 12 September 1998) is a Bangladeshi cricket all-rounder. He made his List A debut for Gazi Group Cricketers in the 2017–18 Dhaka Premier Division Cricket League on 17 February 2018. Prior to his List A debut, he was part of Bangladesh's squad for the 2018 Under-19 Cricket World Cup. He made his Twenty20 debut for Shinepukur Cricket Club in the 2018–19 Dhaka Premier Division Twenty20 Cricket League on 25 February 2019. He made his first-class debut for Khulna Division in the 2019–20 National Cricket League on 16 November 2019.
