= Digvijay Rangi =

Indian cricketer (born 1998)

Personal information
- Full name: Digvijay Birender Rangi
- Born: 15 April 1998 (age 28); Sangrur, Punjab, India
- Source: ESPNcricinfo, 14 January 2021

Digvijay Rangi (born 15 April 1998) is an Indian cricketer. He made his List A debut on 11 February 2018, for Sheikh Jamal Dhanmondi Club in the 2017–18 Dhaka Premier Division Cricket League in Bangladesh. He made his Twenty20 debut on 14 January 2021, for Himachal Pradesh in the 2020–21 Syed Mushtaq Ali Trophy.
