= Salauddin Pappu =

Bangladeshi cricketer (born 1980)

Personal information
- Full name: Salauddin Pappu
- Born: 20 July 1980 (age 46); Rangpur, Bangladesh
- Batting: Right-handed
- Source: Cricinfo, 12 April 2017

Salauddin Pappu (born 2 July 1980) is a Bangladeshi cricketer, who played as a wicketkeeper-batsman. He made his List A debut for Khelaghar Samaj Kallyan Samity in the 2016–17 Dhaka Premier Division Cricket League on 12 April 2017.

On 12 March 2018, Pappu scored his first century in List A cricket, making 125 off 99 balls for Legends of Rupganj against Kala Bagan Krira Chakra in the 2017–18 Dhaka Premier Division Cricket League. He made his Twenty20 debut for Legends of Rupganj in the 2018–19 Dhaka Premier Division Twenty20 Cricket League on 25 February 2019.
