= Jaimul Hasan =

Bangladeshi cricketer (born 1998)

Personal information
- Born: 12 August 1998 (age 28)
- Source: ESPNcricinfo, 29 March 2018

Jaimul Hasan (born 12 August 1998) is a Bangladeshi cricketer. He made his List A debut for Kala Bagan Krira Chakra in the 2017–18 Dhaka Premier Division Cricket League on 29 March 2018.
