= Abahani Limited =

Abahani Limited may refer to:

- Abahani Limited Dhaka, sports club in Dhaka, Bangladesh
- Abahani Limited (Chittagong), sports club in Chittagong, Bangladesh
- Abahani Limited cricket team, List A cricket team in Bangladesh
