= Riyazul Huda =

Bangladeshi cricketer

Personal information
- Full name: Mohammad Riyazul Huda
- Source: ESPNcricinfo, 4 December 2020

Riyazul Huda is a Bangladeshi cricketer. He plays as a batter. He made his List A debut for Kala Bagan Krira Chakra in the 2017–18 Dhaka Premier Division Cricket League on 16 March 2018.
