= Shahbaz Chouhan =

Bangladeshi cricketer (born 1995)

Personal information
- Born: 23 September 1995 (age 31); Dhaka, Bangladesh
- Source: ESPNcricinfo, 26 September 2016

Shahbaz Chouhan (born 23 September 1995) is a Bangladeshi cricketer. He made his List A debut for Kala Bagan Krira Chakra in the Dhaka Premier Division Cricket League on 18 May 2016. He made his Twenty20 debut for Sheikh Jamal Dhanmondi Club in the 2018–19 Dhaka Premier Division Twenty20 Cricket League on 25 February 2019. He made his first-class debut on 14 November 2021, for Dhaka Metropolis in the 2021–22 National Cricket League, where he took three wickets in the match while bowling against Barisal Division, but got a pair while batting.
