= Sandip Roy =

Sandip Roy may refer to:

- Sandip Roy (cricketer) (born 1989), Bangladeshi cricketer

== See also ==
- Sandip Ray (born 1953), Indian film director and music director
