= Mohammad Sozib =

Bangladeshi cricketer (1999–2020)

Personal information
- Born: 1 June 1999; Rajshahi, Bangladesh
- Died: 15 November 2020 (aged 21); Rajshahi, Bangladesh
- Source: Cricinfo, 17 November 2020

Mohammad Sozib (1 June 1999 – 15 November 2020) was a Bangladeshi cricketer who played as an opening batsman and had also played for the Bangladesh national under-19 cricket team. He made his List A debut for Shinepukur Cricket Club in the 2017–18 Dhaka Premier Division Cricket League on 5 February 2018. On 15 November 2020, Sozib was found dead, with local police confirming that he had committed suicide.
