= Mahidul Islam Ankon =

Bangladeshi cricketer (born 1999)

Personal information
- Full name: Mahidul Islam Bhuiyan Ankon
- Born: 4 May 1999 (age 27); Comilla, Bangladesh
- Batting: Right-handed
- Role: Wicket-keeper

International information
- National side: Bangladesh (2024-present)
- Only Test (cap 106): 29 October 2024 v South Africa
- ODI debut (cap 154): 18 October 2025 v West Indies
- Last ODI: 23 October 2025 v West Indies
- ODI shirt no.: 4

Domestic team information
- Years: Team
- 2018-2020: Chittagong Division
- 2018/19: Khulna Titans
- 2019-2024: Comilla Victorians
- 2020-present: Dhaka Division
- 2025: Khulna Tigers
- 2025/26: Noakhali Express

Career statistics
Competition	Test	FC	LA	T20
Matches	1	54	114	92
Runs scored	29	2,400	4,107	1,343
Batting average	14.50	30.76	44.64	22.01
100s/50s	0/0	4/10	5/33	0/3
Top score	29	122	125*	63
Catches/stumpings	1/–	118/20	95/25	44/9
Medal record
Men's Cricket
Representing Bangladesh
South Asian Games
Gold medal – first place	2019 Kathmandu/Pokhara	Team
- Source: ESPNcricinfo, 16 June 2026

Mahidul Islam Ankon (Bengali: মাহিদুল ইসলাম অঙ্কন; born 4 May 1999) is a Bangladeshi cricketer, who plays as a wicketkeeper-batsman. He made his List A debut for Khelaghar Samaj Kallyan Samity in the 2017–18 Dhaka Premier Division Cricket League on 5 February 2018. Prior to his List A debut, he was named in Bangladesh's squad for the 2018 Under-19 Cricket World Cup.

== Career ==
On 24 February 2018, he scored his first century in List A cricket, batting for Khelaghar Samaj Kallyan Samity against Agrani Bank Cricket Club in the 2017–18 Dhaka Premier Division Cricket League.

He made his first-class debut for Chittagong Division in the 2018–19 National Cricket League on 1 October 2018. Later the same month, he was named in the Khulna Titans squad, following the draft for the 2018–19 Bangladesh Premier League. He made his Twenty20 debut for the Khulna Titans in the 2018–19 Bangladesh Premier League on 12 January 2019. He was the leading run-scorer for Khelaghar Samaj Kallyan Samity in the 2018–19 Dhaka Premier Division Cricket League tournament, with 420 runs in 11 matches.

In November 2019, he was named in Bangladesh's squad for the 2019 ACC Emerging Teams Asia Cup in Bangladesh. Later the same month, he was selected to play for the Cumilla Warriors in the 2019–20 Bangladesh Premier League, and he was named in Bangladesh's squad for the men's cricket tournament at the 2019 South Asian Games. The Bangladesh team won the gold medal, after they beat Sri Lanka by seven wickets in the final.

In February 2021, he was selected in the Bangladesh Emerging squad for their home series against the Ireland Wolves. He was selected by the Comilla Victorians for the 2021-22 Bangladesh Premier League.
