= Roni Hossen =

Bangladeshi cricketer (born 2000)

Personal information
- Born: 10 July 2000 (age 26)
- Source: Cricinfo, 13 February 2018

Roni Hossen (born 10 July 2000) is a Bangladeshi cricketer. He made his List A debut for Brothers Union in the 2017–18 Dhaka Premier Division Cricket League on 13 February 2018. Prior to his List A debut, he was part of Bangladesh's squad for the 2018 Under-19 Cricket World Cup.
