= Junaid Siddique =

Bangladeshi cricketer

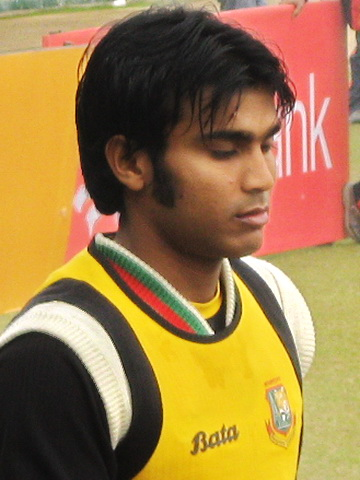
- Siddique in 23 January 2009

Personal information
- Full name: Mohammad Junaid Siddique
- Born: 30 October 1987 (age 39); Rajshahi, Bangladesh
- Nickname: Imrose
- Height: 1.85 m (6 ft 1 in)
- Batting: Left-handed
- Bowling: Right-arm off break
- Role: Batsman

International information
- National side: Bangladesh (2007-2012)
- Test debut (cap 48): 4 January 2008 v New Zealand
- Last Test: 13 November 2012 v West Indies
- ODI debut (cap 86): 26 December 2007 v New Zealand
- Last ODI: 19 August 2011 v Zimbabwe
- ODI shirt no.: 31
- T20I debut (cap 18): 20 September 2007 v Pakistan
- Last T20I: 26 July 2012 v Netherlands
- T20I shirt no.: 31

Domestic team information
- Years: Team
- 2003–present: Rajshahi Division
- 2012: Duronto Rajshahi
- 2013: Rangpur Riders
- 2015–present: Sylhet Super Stars
- 2021–22: Maratha Arabians

Career statistics
Competition	Test	ODI	FC	LA
Matches	19	54	152	188
Runs scored	969	1,196	8,785	5,183
Batting average	26.18	23.00	35.00	28.47
100s/50s	1/7	1/6	18/44	7/30
Top score	106	100	193	136
Balls bowled	18	12	271	47
Wickets	0	0	1	0
Bowling average	–	–	179.00	–
5 wickets in innings	–	–	0	–
10 wickets in match	–	–	0	–
Best bowling	–	–	1/30	–
Catches/stumpings	11/–	22/–	149/–	63/–
- Source: ESPNcricinfo, 27 March 2025

Mohammad Junaid Siddique (born 30 October 1987) is a Bangladeshi cricketer. He is sometimes referred to by his nickname Imrose. A left-handed batsman and occasional right arm off break bowler, he made his debut for Rajshahi Division in 2003/04 and played through the 2006/07 season. He made his Test and ODI debuts during the tour of New Zealand in 2007/08.

== Early life ==
Siddique was born on 30 October 1987 in Rajshahi, Bangladesh. He is of Pakistani Punjabi descent. His grandparents and father originally originated from Sialkot, Punjab, Pakistan but migrated to East Pakistan in 1968 which is now Bangladesh.

== Domestic career ==
Siddique has scored one first-class century, 114 not out against Khulna Division, and also scored a limited overs century, 104 against Chittagong Division. He appeared for Bangladesh A in 2006/07.

Siddique made his debut for Bangladesh in the Twenty20 International World Cup during September 2007. He made 71 on debut, against Pakistan, an innings filled with wristy strokeplay, striking 6 fours and 3 sixes. Siddique scored a half-century against India as part of a Bangladeshi record stand between him and Tamim Iqbal in 2010.

He was the leading run-scorer for Brothers Union in the 2017–18 Dhaka Premier Division Cricket League, with 542 runs in 13 matches. He was also the leading run-scorer for Rajshahi Division in the 2018–19 National Cricket League, with 404 runs in six matches.

In October 2018, he was named in the squad for the Khulna Titans team, following the draft for the 2018–19 Bangladesh Premier League. He was the leading run-scorer for the team in the tournament, with 298 runs in twelve matches. In November 2019, he was selected to play for the Chattogram Challengers in the 2019–20 Bangladesh Premier League.

== International career ==
In December 2007 Siddique was selected in the Test and ODI squads for the tour of New Zealand. On 26 December 2007 he made his ODI debut, scoring 13 runs as an opener. On 4 January 2008 he made his Test debut, scoring 74 in Bangladesh's second innings and sharing in a 161-run opening stand with fellow debutant Tamim Iqbal. The stand is a first wicket record for Bangladesh and the third highest set made by debutants. Siddique scored a patient 74 against South Africa in a Test match in February, the second highest partnership for debutant openers.

He scored his maiden ODI century against Ireland in a lost cause in 2010. He was dropped for the Australian tour of Bangladesh due to his poor run of form in the World Cup.
