= Sandip Roy (cricketer) =

Bangladeshi cricketer (born 1989)

Personal information
- Full name: Sandip Roy Chowdhury Babu
- Born: 1 November 1989 (age 37); Narail, Bangladesh
- Source: Cricinfo, 10 March 2018

Sandip Roy (born 1 November 1989) is a Bangladeshi cricketer. He made his List A debut for Abahani Limited in the 2017–18 Dhaka Premier Division Cricket League on 10 March 2018.
