= Irfan Ahmed (Bangladeshi cricketer) =

Bangladeshi cricketer (born 1994)

Personal information
- Born: 28 October 1994 (age 32); Narayanganj, Bangladesh
- Source: Cricinfo, 2 April 2018

Irfan Ahmed (born 28 October 1994) is a Bangladeshi cricketer. He made his List A debut for Khelaghar Samaj Kallyan Samity in the 2017–18 Dhaka Premier Division Cricket League on 2 April 2018.

As of 2026 that remains his only List A match.
