= Shakhawat Hossain =

Bangladeshi cricketer (born 1998)

Personal information
- Full name: Shakhawat Hossain
- Born: 8 October 1998 (age 28); Chittagong, Bangladesh
- Source: Cricinfo, 15 September 2017

Shakhawat Hossain (born 8 October 1998) is a Bangladeshi cricketer. He made his first-class debut for Chittagong Division in the 2017–18 National Cricket League on 15 September 2017. He made his List A debut for Brothers Union in the 2017–18 Dhaka Premier Division Cricket League on 28 February 2018. His Twenty20 debut was also for Brothers Union, against Abahani Limited, in the 2018–19 Dhaka Premier Division Twenty20 Cricket League on 25 February 2019.
