= Nirjan Bhadra =

Bangladeshi cricketer (born 1994)

Personal information
- Full name: Nirjan Bhadra
- Born: 5 June 1994 (age 32); Satkhira, Bangladesh
- Batting: Left-handed
- Bowling: Slow left-arm orthodox
- Source: ESPNcricinfo, 4 December 2020

Nirjan Bhadra (born 5 June 1994) is a Bangladeshi cricketer. He made his List A debut for Khelaghar Samaj Kallyan Samity in the 2017–18 Dhaka Premier Division Cricket League on 27 March 2018.
