= Fazle Rabby =

Bangladeshi cricketer (born 1997)

Fazley Rabby
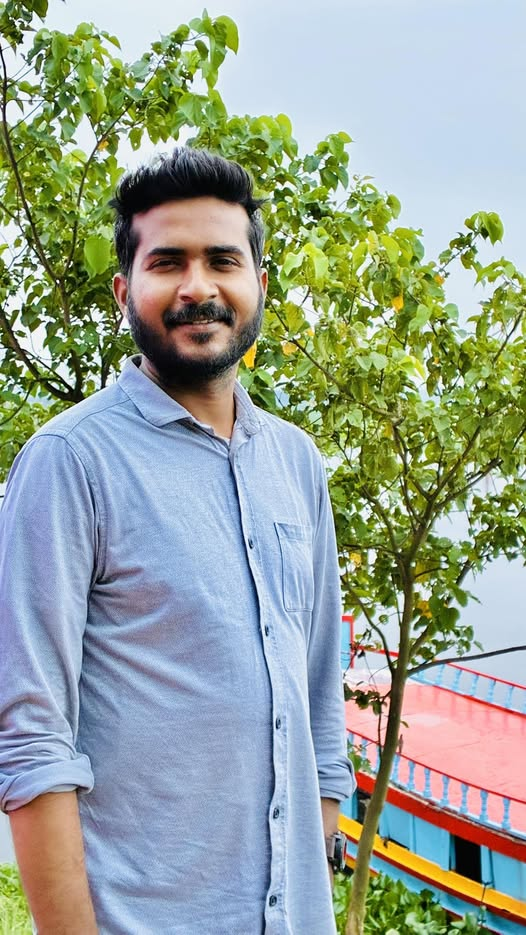

Personal information
- Born: 21 May 1995 (age 31); Rajshahi
- Source: Cricinfo, 6 March 2018

Fazley Rabby (born 1 December 1997) is a Bangladeshi cricketer & entrepreneur. He made his List A debut for Agrani Bank Cricket Club in the 2017–18 Dhaka Premier Division Cricket League on 6 March 2018.
