= Rubel Ahmed (cricketer) =

Bangladeshi cricketer

Rubel Ahmed is a Bangladeshi cricketer. He made his List A debut for Gazi Group Cricketers in the 2017–18 Dhaka Premier Division Cricket League on 9 February 2018.
