= Robiul Haque =

Bangladeshi cricketer (born 1999)

Personal information
- Full name: Robiul Haque
- Born: 28 October 1999 (age 27)
- Batting: Right-handed
- Bowling: Right-arm medium-fast
- Role: Bowler

Career statistics
Competition	FC	LA	T20
Matches	32	57	28
Runs scored	602	568	107
Batting average	20.75	17.21	17.83
100s/50s	0/2	0/0	0/0
Top score	70	32*	18*
Balls bowled	4,915	2,721	519
Wickets	107	92	27
Bowling average	20.90	22.84	27.77
5 wickets in innings	4	3	0
10 wickets in match	0	0	0
Best bowling	5/13	5/33	4/22
Catches/stumpings	16/–	16/–	4/–
- Source: Cricinfo, 12 June 2026

Robiul Haque (born 28 October 1999) is a Bangladeshi cricketer. He made his first-class debut for Rangpur Division in the 2017–18 National Cricket League on 13 October 2017. In December 2017, he was named in Bangladesh's squad for the 2018 Under-19 Cricket World Cup.

He made his List A debut for Sheikh Jamal Dhanmondi Club in the 2017–18 Dhaka Premier Division Cricket League on 15 February 2018. He was the leading wicket-taker for Sheikh Jamal Dhanmondi Club in the 2017–18 Dhaka Premier Division Cricket League, with 27 dismissals in 14 matches.

In October 2018, he was named in the squad for the Chittagong Vikings team, following the draft for the 2018–19 Bangladesh Premier League. He made his Twenty20 debut for the Chittagong Vikings in the 2018–19 Bangladesh Premier League on 25 January 2019. He was also the leading wicket-taker for Rangpur Division in the 2018–19 National Cricket League, with seventeen dismissals in four matches.

He was the leading wicket-taker for Khelaghar Samaj Kallyan Samity in the 2018–19 Dhaka Premier Division Cricket League tournament, with 22 dismissals in 11 matches.
