= Naeem Islam =

Bangladeshi cricketer (born 1986)

Personal information
- Full name: Mohammed Naeem Islam
- Born: 31 December 1986 (age 39); Gaibandha, Bangladesh
- Nickname: Chokka Naeem
- Batting: Right-handed
- Bowling: Right arm off break
- Role: Batting all-rounder

International information
- National side: Bangladesh (2008–2014)
- Test debut (cap 51): 17 October 2008 v New Zealand
- Last Test: 21 November 2012 v West Indies
- ODI debut (cap 92): 9 October 2008 v New Zealand
- Last ODI: 1 March 2014 v Afghanistan
- ODI shirt no.: 77
- T20I debut (cap 21): 5 November 2008 v South Africa
- Last T20I: 6 November 2013 v New Zealand
- T20I shirt no.: 77

Domestic team information
- Years: Team
- 2004–2011: Rajshahi Division
- 2011–2025: Rangpur Division
- 2012: Sylhet Royals
- 2013, 2025: Chittagong Kings
- 2015: Chittagong Vikings
- 2016: Rangpur Riders
- 2022: Chattogram Challengers

Career statistics
Competition	Test	ODI	FC	LA
Matches	8	59	186	263
Runs scored	416	975	11,253	8,149
Batting average	32.00	27.08	42.46	42.00
100s/50s	1/1	0/5	34/47	13/53
Top score	108	84	221	124
Balls bowled	574	1,743	5,789	5,942
Wickets	1	35	55	140
Bowling average	303.00	40.20	51.90	32.15
5 wickets in innings	0	0	1	0
10 wickets in match	0	0	0	0
Best bowling	1/11	3/32	5/50	4/31
Catches/stumpings	2/–	19/–	107/1	108/2
Medal record
Representing Bangladesh
Men's Cricket
Asian Games
Gold medal – first place	2010 Guangzhou	Team
- Source: ESPNcricinfo, 5 March 2026

Mohammad Naeem Islam (Bengali: মোহাম্মদ নাঈম ইসলাম; born 31 December 1986) is a former Bangladeshi international cricketer and the current national selector of Bangladesh national cricket team. He was born on 31 December 1986 in Gaibandha and is a right-handed batsman and occasional off-break bowler.

== Domestic career ==
He made his debut for Rajshahi Division in 2004/05 and played through the 2006/07 season, after having represented the full range of Bangladesh representative youth teams and went on to make his international debut on 9 October 2008 against New Zealand. He has scored seven centuries and 17 fifties in first-class cricket as of December 2011, with a best of 136 against Barisal Division.

He was the leading run-scorer for Legends of Rupganj in the 2017–18 Dhaka Premier Division Cricket League, (720 runs in 16 matches). He was also the leading run-scorer for Rangpur Division in the 2018–19 National Cricket League (444 runs in six matches), and for North Zone in the 2018–19 Bangladesh Cricket League (522 runs in six matches).

== International career ==
Following the exodus of 14 players to the Dhaka Warriors team of the unsanctioned Indian Cricket League, Bangladesh were forced to introduce new players. Naeem Islam was one of three uncapped players called into the Bangladesh squad for a series of three One Day Internationals (ODIs) against New Zealand in October 2008, shortly after the exodus. Chief selector Rafiqul Alam called Islam a "talented young batsman". He played in all three matches in the series, although he only got a chance to face a ball in the second match, as he was run out without facing a ball in the first match. Naeem top scored in the final match with an unbeaten 46 in Chittagong, although that was unable to prevent his team from slumping to a 79-run loss.

That was followed by his inclusion in the Test squad to face New Zealand in Chittagong, where he made his Test debut, scoring 14 in the first innings and 19 in the second. On a turning track, he picked up his maiden Test wicket when he dismissed Daniel Flynn caught behind in New Zealand's first innings.

Naeem was part of the 13-man Bangladesh squad that played in the 2010 Asian Games in late November. They played Afghanistan in the final and won by five wickets, securing the country's first gold medal at the Asian Games. The Bangladesh Cricket Board founded the six-team Bangladesh Premier League in 2012, a twenty20 tournament to be held in February that year. An auction was held for teams to buy players, and Naeem was bought by the Sylhet Royals for $90,000.

== International centuries ==
Test centuries by Naeem Islam
No.	Runs	Against	Venue	H/A	Date	Result	Ref
1	108	West Indies	Sher-e-Bangla National Cricket Stadium, Dhaka	Home	15 November 2012	Lost	
