= Zabid Hossain =

Bangladeshi cricketer (born 1992)

Personal information
- Born: 12 September 1992 (age 34)
- Source: Cricinfo, 16 October 2018

Zabid Hossain (born 12 September 1992) is a Bangladeshi cricketer. He made his first-class debut for Dhaka Metropolis in the 2014–15 National Cricket League on 25 January 2015.
