= Shamsul Islam (cricketer) =

Bangladeshi cricketer (born 1994)

Personal information
- Full name: Shamsul Islam
- Born: 2 September 1994 (age 32)
- Source: Cricinfo, 16 September 2017

Shamsul Islam (born 2 September 1994) is a Bangladeshi cricketer. He made his first-class debut for Barisal Division in the 2011–12 National Cricket League on 21 November 2011. He made his Twenty20 debut on 23 June 2021, for Legends of Rupganj in the 2021 Dhaka Premier Division Twenty20 Cricket League.
