= Ali Arman =

Bangladeshi cricketer (born 1983)

Personal information
- Born: 12 December 1983 (age 42); Dhaka, Bangladesh
- Batting: Right-handed
- Bowling: Right-arm off-break
- Role: Bowling All-rounder, Umpire

Domestic team information
- Years: Team
- 2007: Barisal Division
- Chittagon Division
- Abahani Limited

Umpiring information
- WODIs umpired: 1 (2023)
- WT20Is umpired: 8 (2023–2024)

Career statistics
Competition	FC	LA
Matches	34	24
Runs scored	1,269	247
Batting average	30.21	17.64
100s/50s	1/6	0/0
Top score	109*	41*
Balls bowled	5,201	1,182
Wickets	54	20
Bowling average	43.11	42.40
5 wickets in innings	1	0
10 wickets in match	0	NA
Best bowling	5/25	4/35
Catches/stumpings	7/0	4/0
- Source: ESPNcricinfo, 28 November 2023

Ali Arman (Bengali: আলী আরমান; born 12 December 1983) is a Bangladeshi former cricket all-rounder. He played 34 first-class and 24 List A matches between 2001 and 2007. He was also part of Bangladesh's squad for the 2002 Under-19 Cricket World Cup. He is now an umpire, and stood in matches in the 2017–18 Dhaka Premier Division Cricket League.

He made news when he tested COVID-19 positive while serving as a reserve umpire during a 2020–21 Bangabandhu T20 Cup match and was later withdrawn from the list of match officials.
