= Agrani Bank Cricket Club =

Bangladesh cricket team

Personnel
- Captain: Imrul Kayes
- Owner: Agrani Bank

Team information
- City: Dhaka
- Founded: 1972

Agrani Bank Cricket Club is a cricket team in Bangladesh. They were one of the twelve teams that took part in the 2017–18 Dhaka Premier Division Cricket League tournament. They were relegated after one season, but have since returned to the league for the 2022–23, 2024–25 and 2025–26 seasons.

== History ==
The club is owned by the state-owned Agrani Bank, one of the largest banks in Bangladesh. It is one of the oldest existing cricket clubs in Bangladesh, having competed in domestic cricket since the first competitions in 1972–73. The team was promoted to the Dhaka Premier Division for 2017–18 after finishing first in Group A of the Dhaka First Division Cricket League in 2016–17.

In their first List A match, in the first round of the 2017–18 tournament, they beat the defending champions Gazi Group Cricketers by 8 wickets. However, they finished the group stage of the 2017–18 tournament in eleventh place, therefore qualifying for the relegation playoffs. In the final match of the relegation playoffs, they lost to Brothers Union by four wickets, therefore relegating them to the Dhaka First Division Cricket League for the next season.

Agrani Bank returned to the Dhaka Premier Division Cricket League for the 2022–23 competition. They finished eleventh, and were relegated for the 2023–24 season. They finished on top of the Dhaka First Division Cricket League in 2023–24, and were again promoted to the Premier Division for the 2024–25 season.

In their first match in the 2024–25 competition, captained by Imrul Kayes, Agrani Bank beat the previous season's champions, Abahani Limited, by six wickets with five overs to spare.

== List A record ==
- 2017–18: 13 matches, won 5, finished eleventh
- 2022–23: 13 matches, won 4, finished eleventh
- 2024–25: 16 matches, won 8, finished sixth
- 2025–26: 11 matches, won 6, finished sixth

== Records ==
Agrani Bank's highest individual List A score is 154 by Soumya Sarkar in 2017–18, and the best bowling figures are 5 for 34 by Elias Sunny in 2022–23.
