= Legends of Rupganj =

- LOR

Personnel
- Owner: Lutfar Rahman Badal

Team information
- Founded: 2014

Legends of Rupganj is a team that plays List A cricket in the Dhaka Premier Division. Rupganj, in Narayanganj District, just to the east of Dhaka, is the home town of the club's founding owner, Lutfar Rahman Badal.

== History ==
Under their previous name, Gazi Tank Cricketers, they won the title in 2013–14. In the 2014–15 season, under their new name and ownership, they finished fifth.

- 2014–15: 16 matches, won 8, finished fifth
- 2015–16: 16 matches, won 9, finished third
- 2016–17: 11 matches, won 6, finished seventh
- 2017–18: 16 matches, won 10, finished second
- 2018–19: 16 matches, won 13, finished second
- 2021–22: 15 matches, won 11, finished second
- 2022–23: 16 matches, won 9, finished fourth
- 2023–24: 11 matches, won 6, finished seventh
- 2024–25: 16 matches, won 9, finished fourth
- 2025–26: 11 matches, won 7, finished fourth

Naeem Islam captained the team from 2017–18 to 2021–22, Mashrafe Mortaza in 2022–23.

== Records ==
The team's highest score is 141 by Ashar Zaidi against Old DOHS Sports Club in the first match of the 2014–15 season. The best bowling figures are 6 for 33, performed twice: by Naeem Islam against Partex Sporting Club, in the second match of the 2014–15 season, and by Mohammad Sharif, who also took a hat-trick in the same innings, against Gazi Group Cricketers in 2017–18.

== Current squad ==
Players with international caps are listed in bold

Name	Nat	Batting style	Bowling style	Notes
Batsmen
**Naeem Islam**	(Bangladesh)	Right-hand bat	Right-arm off break	**Captain**
Mohammad Naim	(Bangladesh)	Left-hand bat		
**Shahriar Nafees**	(Bangladesh)	Left-hand bat		
Mehedi Maruf	(Bangladesh)	Right-hand bat	Right-arm off break	
**Mominul Haque**	(Bangladesh)	Left-hand bat	Slow left-arm orthodox	
Azmir Ahmed	(Bangladesh)	Right-hand bat	Right-arm off break	
Akbar-ur-Rehman	(Pakistan)	Right-hand bat	Right-arm leg break	
All-rounders
Asif Ahmed	(Bangladesh)	Right-hand bat	Right-arm off break	
Wicketkeepers
Jaker Ali	(Bangladesh)	Right-hand bat	-	
Salauddin Pappu	(Bangladesh)	Right-hand bat	-	
Spin Bowlers
Nabil Samad	(Bangladesh)	Left-hand bat	Slow left-arm orthodox	
Asif Hasan	(Bangladesh)	Right-hand bat	Slow left-arm orthodox	
Minhazur Rahman	(Bangladesh)	Right-hand bat	Slow left-arm orthodox	
Bowlers
**Muktar Ali**	(Bangladesh)	Right-hand bat	Right-arm medium-fast	
**Mohammad Shahid**	(Bangladesh)	Right-hand bat	Right-arm medium-fast	
**Rishi Dhawan**	(India)	Right-hand bat	Right-arm medium-fast	
**Subashis Roy**	(Bangladesh)	Right-hand bat	Right-arm fast-medium	
**Taskin Ahmed**	(Bangladesh)	Left-hand bat	Right-arm fast	
