= Mizanur Rahman (cricketer) =

Bangladeshi cricketer (born 1991)

Personal information
- Born: 30 July 1991 (age 35); Rajshahi, Bangladesh
- Batting: Right-handed
- Bowling: Right-arm offbreak
- Role: Batsman

Domestic team information
- Years: Team
- 2008/09–present: Rajshahi Division
- 2012; 2025: Duronto Rajshahi
- 2013: Khulna Royal Bengals
- 2013/14: Kalabagan Cricket Academy
- 2014/15: Prime Doleshwar Sporting Club
- 2016: Legends of Rupganj
- 2017–: Brothers Union
- 2018/19: Dhaka Dynamites
- 2021/22: Sylhet Sunrisers
- 2021/22: Rupganj Tigers
- 2023: Dhaka Dominators

Career statistics
Competition	FC	LA	T20
Matches	85	119	43
Runs scored	4,249	3,519	789
Batting average	28.90	30.33	21.91
100s/50s	12/12	6/17	1/5
Top score	176	136*	100*
Catches/stumpings	60/–	39/1	12/–
- Source: ESPNcricinfo, 8 November 2025

Mizanur Rahman (born 30 July 1991) is a first-class and List A cricketer from Bangladesh. He played for Duronto Rajshahi in the 2012 BPL tournament where he scored a half century on debut.

In December 2017, he and Nazmul Hossain Shanto batting for Rajshahi Division against Dhaka Metropolis in the 2017–18 National Cricket League, made the highest opening partnership in a domestic first-class match in Bangladesh, scoring 341 runs.

He was the leading run-scorer for Central Zone in the 2017–18 Bangladesh Cricket League, with 439 runs in six matches.

In October 2018, he was named in the squad for the Dhaka Dynamites team, following the draft for the 2018–19 Bangladesh Premier League. In December 2018, he was named in Bangladesh's team for the 2018 ACC Emerging Teams Asia Cup.
