= Shafiuddin Ahmed =

Bangladeshi cricketer (born 1973)

Personal information
- Full name: Shafiuddin Ahmed Babu
- Born: 1 June 1973 (age 53); Dhaka, Bangladesh
- Batting: Right-handed
- Bowling: Right-arm fast-medium

International information
- National side: Bangladesh
- ODI debut (cap 37): 11 October 1997 v Zimbabwe
- Last ODI: 2 June 2000 v Pakistan
- ODI shirt no.: 12

Career statistics
Competition	Tests	ODIs
Matches	-	11
Runs scored	-	22
Batting average	-	5.50
100s/50s	-	-/-
Top score	-	11
Balls bowled	-	495
Wickets	-	11
Bowling average	-	38.72
5 wickets in innings	-	-
10 wickets in match	-	n/a
Best bowling	-	3/42
Catches/stumpings	-/-	-/-
- Source: Cricinfo, 27 July 2019

Shafiuddin Ahmed Babu (born June 1, 1973, Dhaka) is a Bangladeshi former cricketer who played in eleven One Day Internationals from 1997 to 2000. He is now an umpire and has stood in matches in Bangladesh's National Cricket League.
