= Shinepukur Cricket Club =

Cricket team

Personnel
- Captain: Rayan Rafsan
- Owner: Beximco

Team information
- Founded: 2016

Shinepukur Cricket Club is a cricket team in Bangladesh that has competed in the 50-over Dhaka Premier Division Cricket League.

Before the 2016–17 season the Cricket Coaching School club defaulted on its player payments and was bought by Beximco, Bangladesh's largest conglomerate, and renamed Shinepukur Cricket Club, after Shinepukur Ceramics, a subsidiary of Beximco. Shinepukur Cricket Club were one of the twelve teams that took part in the 2017–18 Dhaka Premier Division Cricket League tournament. In their first match of the tournament, they beat Prime Doleshwar Sporting Club by eight wickets. They finished the group stage of the 2017–18 tournament in eighth place, with five wins and six defeats from their eleven matches.

In the 2023–24 competition Shinepukur finished the preliminary rounds in second place, reaching the Super League phase for the first time. However, the next season they finished last and were relegated.

== List A record ==
- 2017–18: 11 matches, won 5, finished eighth
- 2018–19: 11 matches, 5 wins and a tie, finished seventh
- 2021–22: 10 matches, won 4, finished eighth
- 2022–23: 13 matches, won 4, finished tenth
- 2023–24: 16 matches, won 9, finished fourth
- 2024–25: 13 matches, won 1, finished twelfth (last)

== Records ==
Shinepukur's highest List A score is 144 not out by Shadman Islam in 2017–18, and the best bowling figures are 5 for 43 by Naeem Ahmed in 2022–23.
