= Dhanmondi Sports Club cricket team =

Bangladeshi cricket team

Dhanmondi Sports Club
Personnel
- Captain: Nurul Hasan
- Coach: Mohammad Ashraful

History
- Dhaka Premier Division Cricket League wins: 1
- Dhaka Premier Division Twenty20 Cricket League wins: 1

Dhanmondi Sports Club is a Bangladeshi cricket team that plays List A cricket in the Dhaka Premier League and Twenty20 cricket in the Dhaka Premier Division Twenty20 Cricket League. It is affiliated with Sheikh Jamal Dhanmondi Club football team.

Originally named Dhanmondi Club, it was renamed Sheikh Jamal Dhanmondi Club in 2009 after Sheikh Jamal, a son of Sheikh Mujibur Rahman. It reverted to its old name before the 2024–25 Dhaka Premier Division Cricket League.

== Honours ==
- Dhaka Premier Division Cricket League
  - Winners: 2021–22
  - Runners-up: 2013–14, 2022–23
- Dhaka Premier Division Twenty20 Cricket League
  - Winners: 2018–19

== List A record ==
- 2013–14: 15 matches, won 10, finished second
- 2014–15: 11 matches, won 4, finished ninth
- 2015–16: 11 matches, won 5, finished ninth
- 2016–17: 16 matches, won 7, finished sixth
- 2017–18: 16 matches, won 10, finished third
- 2018–19: 16 matches, won 9, finished fourth
- 2021–22: 15 matches, won 12, champions
- 2022–23: 16 matches, won 13, finished second
- 2023–24: 16 matches, won 9, finished fifth
- 2024–25: 11 matches, won 4, finished eighth

Nurul Hasan captained the team in 2017–18, 2018–19, 2022–23, 2023–24 and 2024–25. Imrul Kayes captained the team to the title in 2021–22.

== Twenty20 record ==
Dhanmondi Sports Club won the inaugural tournament of the Dhaka Premier Division Twenty20 Cricket League in 2018–19 when, captained by Nurul Hasan, they defeated Prime Doleshwar Sporting Club in the final by 24 runs.

== Records ==
The team's highest List A individual score is 145 not out (off 118 balls) by Mushfiqur Rahim in 2013–14, and the best bowling figures are 5 for 18 by Arafat Sunny in 2014–15.
