= Kala Bagan Krira Chakra =

- KKC, KBKC

Team information
- Founded: 1982

History
- Dhaka Premier Division Cricket League wins: 0

Kala Bagan Krira Chakra (also known as Kalabagan Krira Chakra) is a team that played List A cricket in the Dhaka Premier League from 2013–14 to 2017–18. Kalabagan is a suburb of Dhaka. "Kalabagan Krira Chakra" translates as "Kalabagan Sports Circle".

After the team finished last in 2017–18 it was demoted to the sub-List-A Dhaka First Division Cricket League, where it still plays.

== List A results ==
- 2013–14: 10 matches, won 2, finished tenth
- 2014–15: 13 matches, won 4, finished tenth
- 2015–16: 11 matches, won 6, finished eighth
- 2016–17: 11 matches, won 4, finished ninth
- 2017–18: 13 matches, won 2, finished last

Several players captained the side in 2013–14, Abdur Razzak was the captain in 2014–15, Mashrafe Mortaza in 2015–16, Mohammad Ashraful and Tushar Imran in 2016–17, and Muktar Ali in 2017–18.

== Records ==
Since the league gained List A status, Kala Bagan Krira Chakra's highest score is 127 by Mohammad Ashraful in 2017–18, and the best bowling figures are 6 for 42 by Mashrafe Mortaza in 2015–16.
