= Abahani Limited cricket team =

List A Dhaka Premier League cricket team

Abahani Limited
- Nickname: ABL

Personnel
- Captain: Mosaddek Hossain

History
- No. of titles: 6

The Abahani Limited cricket team has played List A cricket in the Dhaka Premier League since 2013–14. It won the title in 2015–16, 2017–18, 2018–19, 2022–23, and 2023–24. In Twenty20 cricket, it also won the 2021 Dhaka Premier Division Twenty20 Cricket League.

== History ==
Abahani Limited was founded by Sheikh Kamal, the eldest son of Sheikh Mujibur Rahman, the founding president of Bangladesh. The club has always had close ties with the Awami League.

Between 1974–75, when the Dhaka Premier League was formed, and 2012–13, Abahani Limited won the competition 17 times. Their victories included the inaugural season of 1974–75 and three instances of three championships in a row.

Since the competition gained List A status in 2013–14, Abahani has continued to be the most successful team, winning six of the ten tournaments. In 2023–24 they became the first team in the league's List A history to win every match in a season.

=== List A results ===
- 2013–14: 4 wins from 10 matches, finished ninth
- 2014–15: 10 wins from 16 matches, finished fourth
- 2015–16: 11 wins from 16 matches, champions
- 2016–17: 12 wins from 16 matches, finished third
- 2017–18: 12 wins from 16 matches, champions
- 2018–19: 13 wins from 16 matches, champions
- 2019–20: Abandoned
- 2021–22: 9 wins from 15 matches, finished fourth
- 2022–23: 14 wins from 16 matches, champions
- 2023–24: 16 wins from 16 matches, champions
- 2024–25: 14 wins from 16 matches, champions
- 2025–26: 8 wins from 11 matches, finished second

=== Twenty20 results ===
- 2018–19: 1 win from 2 matches, second in Group A
- 2019–20: Not held
- 2021: 12 wins from 16 matches, champions

== Records ==
Since the Dhaka Premier League gained List A status, Abahani Limited's highest score is 142 by Tamim Iqbal, and the best bowling figures are 7 for 58 by Saqlain Sajib. Both took place in the last match of the 2015–16 season, in which Abahani clinched their first List A title.

== Current squad ==
Players with international caps are listed in bold

Name	Nat	Batting style	Bowling style	Notes
Batters
**Nazmul Hossain Shanto**	(Bangladesh)	Left-hand bat	Right-arm off break	
Parvez Hossain Emon	(Bangladesh)	Left-hand bat		
**Jishan Alam**	(Bangladesh)	Right-hand bat	Right-arm off break	
Mominul Haque	(Bangladesh)	Left-hand bat	Slow Left-arm Orthodox	
All-rounders
**Mosaddek Hossain**	(Bangladesh)	Right-hand bat	Right-arm off break	**Captain**
**SM Meherob**	(Bangladesh)	Right-hand bat	Right-arm off break	
**Mrittunjoy Chowdhury**	(Bangladesh)	Left-hand bat	Left-arm fast-medium	
**Mahfuzur Rahman Rabby**	(Bangladesh)	Left-hand bat	Slow left-arm orthodox	
Wicketkeepers
Shamsul Islam	(Bangladesh)	Right-hand bat		
**Mohammad Mithun**	(Bangladesh)	Right-hand bat	-	
Shahriar Komol	(Bangladesh)	Right-hand bat	-	
Spin Bowlers
**Rakibul Hasan**	(Bangladesh)	Left-hand bat	Slow left-arm orthodox	
Naimur Rahman Noyon	(Bangladesh)	Left-hand bat	Slow left-arm orthodox	
Bowlers
**Ripon Mondol**	(Bangladesh)	Right-hand bat	Right-arm fast-medium	
**Nahid Rana**	(Bangladesh)	Right-hand bat	Right-arm fast	
Mehedi Hasan	(Bangladesh)	Right-hand bat	Right-arm fast-medium	
Anamul Haque	(Bangladesh)	Right-hand bat	Right-arm fast-medium	
