= 2016–17 National Cricket League =

Cricket tournament

- Dates: 25 September 2016 – 6 January 2017
- Administrator: Bangladesh Cricket Board
- Cricket format: First-class
- Tournament format: Double round-robin
- Champions: Khulna Division (5th title)
- Participants: 8
- Matches: 24
- Most runs: Alok Kapali (598)
- Most wickets: Abu Jayed (29)

The 2016–17 National Cricket League was the eighteenth edition of the National Cricket League, a first-class cricket competition that was held in Bangladesh. The tournament started on 25 September 2016 and concluded on 6 January 2017. Khulna Division were the defending champions.

Heavy rain affected the first three rounds of matches, with only two matches out of twelve ending in a result other than a draw. The Bangladesh Cricket Board (BCB) announced that all matches scheduled to take place on 14 October 2016 would be delayed until the weather improved. However, there was no improvement in the weather and those matches and future fixtures were postponed due to the upcoming Bangladesh Premier League (BPL). The tournament restarted on 20 December 2016 after the conclusion of the BPL.

Khulna Division retained their title when they beat Dhaka Metropolis by 398 runs in their final match. Dhaka Metropolis were relegated to Tier 2 for the next season, while Rangpur Division were promoted to Tier 1.

Following the conclusion of this tournament, the 2016–17 Bangladesh Cricket League began.

== Squads ==
Barisal Division	Dhaka Division	Dhaka Metropolis	Khulna Division	Chittagong Division	Rajshahi Division	Rangpur Division	Sylhet Division
Abdulla-Al-Saif; Abu Sayeem; Al-Amin; Fazle Mahmud; Golam Kabir; Islamul Ahsan; Kamrul Islam Rabbi; Mohammad Manik; Monir Hossain; Mosaddek Hossain; Nuruzzaman; Saleh Ahmed Shawon; Salman Hossain; Shahin Hossain; Shahriar Nafees; Sohag Gazi; Tawhidul Islam; Zakaria Masud	Dewan Sabbir; Jony Talukdar; Joyraz Sheik; Mahbubul Alam; Mohammad Azim; Mohammad Masum; Mohammad Sharif; Mosharraf Hossain; Nadif Chowdhury; Nazmul Hossain; Prosenjit Das; Rakibul Hasan; Rony Talukdar; Saghir Hossain; Saif Hassan; Shahadat Hossain; Shuvagata Hom; Tayabur Rahman Fahim; Zahiduzzaman	Abu Hider; Arafat Sunny; Ashiquzzaman; Asif Ahmed; Asif Hasan; Marshall Ayub; Mehedi Maruf; Mehrab Hossain jnr; Mohammad Ashraful; Mohammad Shohid; Moinul Islam; Nazmul Hossain Milon; Shadman Islam; Shahbaz Chouhan; Shohidul Islam; Shamsur Rahman; Sharifullah	Abdul Halim; Abdur Razzak; Amit Majumder; Bishawnath Halder; Mahedi Hasan; Mehedi Hasan; Mohammad Mithun; Murad Khan; Nahidul Islam; Najmus Sadat; Nurul Hasan; Robiul Islam; Robiul Islam Robi; Tushar Imran; Ziaur Rahman	Abdullah Al Mamun; Belal Hossen; Iftekhar Sajjad; Irfan Sukkur; Jashimuddin; Jasimuddin; Kazi Kamrul Islam; Mahbubul Karim; Mohammad Saifuddin; Mojibur Rahman; Mominul Haque; Moniruzzaman; Nazimuddin; Noor Hossain; Rony Chowdhury; Saeed Sarkar; Sazzadul Haque; Tasamul Haque; Yasir Ali; Yeasin Arafat	Avishek Mitra; Delwar Hossain; Farhad Hossain; Farhad Reza; Habibur Rahman; Hamidul Islam; Jahurul Islam; Jubair Ahmed; Junaid Siddique; Mizanur Rahman; Muktar Ali; Myshukur Rahaman; Naeem Islam; Najmul Hossain Shanto; Saqlain Sajib; Sujon Hawlader; Tanumoy Ghosh; Touhid Tareq	Abdur Rahman; Ahmedul Kabir; Alauddin Babu; Ariful Haque; Dhiman Ghosh; Jahid Javed; Litton Das; Mahmudul Hasan; Naeem Islam; Nobin Islam; Saddam Hossain; Saddam Hossain; Sajedul Islam; Sanjit Saha; Saymon Ahmed; Subashis Roy; Suhrawadi Shuvo; Tanvir Haider	Abul Hasan; Abu Jayed; Alok Kapali; Ebadot Hossain; Enamul Haque jnr; Imran Ali; Imtiaz Hossain; Rajin Saleh; Ruman Ahmed; Ahmed Sadequr; Sayem Alam; Shahanur Rahman; Shanaj Ahmed; Khaled Ahmed; Zakir Hasan; Ezaz Ahmed; Nasum Ahmed; Nazmul Hossain Milon; Rahatul Ferdous

== Fixtures ==
=== Tier 1 ===
Points table

Team	Pld	W	L	D	A	Pts
Khulna Division	6	2	0	4	0	58
Dhaka Division	6	4	0	4	0	54
Barisal Division	6	0	2	4	0	32
Dhaka Metropolis	6	0	2	4	0	29

- 2016–17 Champions
- Bottom placed team relegated to Tier 2 for 2017–18 National Cricket League.

25–28 September 2016
Scorecard

Dhaka Metropolis	v	Dhaka Division
47/2 (15 overs); Shadman Islam 18* (38); Mohammad Sharif 2/18 (6 overs)

Match drawn
Shaheed Chandu Stadium, Bogra
Umpires: Akteruzzaman and Mahfuzur Rahman

- Dhaka Metropolis won the toss and elected to bat.
- Only 15 overs of play were possible across all four days due to rain.
- Zahiduzzaman (Dhaka Division) made his first-class debut.

25–28 September 2016
Scorecard

Barisal Division	v	Khulna Division
261 (80 overs); Fazle Mahmud 82 (118); Al-Amin Hossain 3/38 (17 overs)		424 (99.3 overs); Abdur Razzak 97 (155); Golam Kabir 3/32 (12 overs)
248/8 (87 overs); Shahriar Nafees 72 (127); Mehedi Hasan Miraz 2/52 (24 overs)

Match drawn
Sheikh Abu Naser Stadium, Khulna
Umpires: Imran Parvez and Mozahiduzzaman
Player of the match: Abdur Razzak (Khulna Division)

- Barisal Division won the toss and elected to bat.

2–5 October 2016
Scorecard

Barisal Division	v	Dhaka Metropolis
419 (118 overs); Sohag Gazi 142 (190); Mohammad Ashraful 4/62 (21 overs)		245 (99.3 overs); Shamsur Rahman 49 (117); Monir Hossain 2/29 (15 overs)
		353/7 (127 overs) (f/o); Shadman Islam 88 (236); Saleh Ahmed Shawon 3/100 (37 overs)

Match drawn
Sheikh Abu Naser Stadium, Khulna
Umpires: Imran Parvez and Tanvir Ahmed
Player of the match: Sohag Gazi (Barisal Division)

- Barisal Division won the toss and elected to bat.

2–5 October 2016
Scorecard

Khulna Division	v	Dhaka Division
172/1 (50.5 overs); Anamul Haque 84* (145); Shahadat Hossain 1/34 (9 overs)

Match drawn
Shaheed Chandu Stadium, Bogra
Umpires: Akteruzzaman and Gazi Sohel

- Dhaka Division won the toss and elected to field.

8–11 October 2016
Scorecard

Khulna Division	v	Dhaka Metropolis
293 (104.4 overs); Nurul Hasan 103* (172); Arafat Sunny 3/113 (41.4 overs)		59/0d (20 overs); Mehedi Maruf 34* (56)

Match drawn
Sheikh Kamal International Cricket Stadium, Cox's Bazar
Umpires: Gazi Sohel and Imran Parvez
Player of the match: Nurul Hasan (Khulna Division)

- Khulna Division won the toss and elected to bat.
- Asif Hossain (Dhaka Metropolis) made his first-class debut.

8–11 October 2016
Scorecard

Dhaka Division	v	Barisal Division
523 (132 overs); Taibur Rahman 147 (229); Monir Hossain 5/152 (41.3 overs)		103/1d (24 overs); Fazle Mahmud 55* (66); Mohammad Sharif 1/20 (7 overs)

Match drawn
Sheikh Kamal International Cricket Stadium Academy Ground, Cox's Bazar
Umpires: Akteruzzaman and Mahfuzur Rahman
Player of the match: Taibur Rahman (Dhaka Division)

- Dhaka Division won the toss and elected to bat.

20–23 December 2016
Scorecard

Barisal Division	v	Khulna Division
171 (60.4 overs); Fazle Mahmud 95 (150); Ziaur Rahman 3/29 (10.4 overs)		371 (102 overs); Anamul Haque 136 (202); Monir Hossain 6/66 (23 overs)
211 (46.3 overs); Monir Hossain 70 (72); Ashiquzzaman 6/57 (13.3 overs)		15/0 (1.4 overs); Mahedi Hasan 11* (8)

Khulna Division won by 10 wickets
Bangladesh Krira Shikkha Protisthan No 3 Ground, Savar
Umpires: Anisur Rahman and Gazi Sohel
Player of the match: Ashiquzzaman (Khulna Division)

- Barisal Division won the toss and elected to bat.
- Ashiquzzaman (Khulna Division) made his first-class debut.
- Tushar Imran (Khulna Division) scored his 19th century, the most first-class hundreds by a Bangladeshi.

20–23 December 2016
Scorecard

Dhaka Metropolis	v	Dhaka Division
166 (77.1 overs); Shadman Islam 47 (111); Mohammad Sharif 4/35 (13.1 overs)		187 (63 overs); Minhaz Khan 43 (77); Shohidul Islam 3/44 (14 overs)
125 (55.5 overs); Mehrab Hossain 39 (60); Mohammad Sharif 3/24 (16 overs)		106/5 (31.5 overs); Joyraz Sheik 30 (69); Abu Hider 4/42 (11 overs)

Dhaka Division won by 5 wickets
Khan Shaheb Osman Ali Stadium, Fatullah
Umpires: Mahfuzur Rahman and Masudur Rahman
Player of the match: Mohammad Sharif (Dhaka Division)

- Dhaka Division won the toss and elected to field.
- Minhaz Khan (Dhaka Division) made his first-class debut.

27–30 December 2016
Scorecard

Dhaka Division	v	Khulna Division
366 (103.3 overs); Raqibul Hasan 111 (137); Abdur Razzak 5/103 (34.3 overs)		342 (96 overs); Tushar Imran 141 (240); Dewan Sabbir 5/58 (23 overs)
278/8d (82.3 overs); Mohammad Sharif 86 (108); Al-Amin Hossain 4/69 (21 overs)		92/3 (26 overs); Hasanuzzaman 55 (53); Mohammad Nazmul Islam 2/32 (10 overs)

Match drawn
Khan Shaheb Osman Ali Stadium, Fatullah
Umpires: Anisur Rahman and Nadir Shah
Player of the match: Raqibul Hasan (Dhaka Division)

- Khulna Division won the toss and elected to field.
- Hasanuzzaman (Khulna Division) made his first-class debut.

27–30 December 2016
Scorecard

Dhaka Metropolis	v	Barisal Division
292 (115.5 overs); Mehrab Hossain 61 (235); Monir Hossain 5/51 (25.5 overs)		280 (81.2 overs); Al-Amin 89 (126); Abu Hider 4/81 (20 overs)
223 (70.1 overs); Marshall Ayub 54 (70); Sohag Gazi 3/53 (24 overs)		171/6 (37 overs); Al-Amin 69 (73); Abu Hider 3/51 (11 overs)

Match drawn
Bangladesh Krira Shikkha Protisthan No 3 Ground, Savar
Umpires: Gazi Sohel and Masudur Rahman
Player of the match: Al-Amin (Barisal Division)

- Barisal Division won the toss and elected to field.
- Moin Khan (Barisal Division) made his first-class debut.

3–6 January 2017
Scorecard

Khulna Division	v	Dhaka Metropolis
207 (61.4 overs); Anamul Haque 62 (136); Dolar Mahmud 5/53 (14 overs)		122 (36 overs); Sharifullah 38 (60); Abdur Razzak 3/15 (7 overs)
423/5d (80 overs); Tushar Imran 138 (169); Mehrab Hossain 1/45 (6 overs)		110 (39 overs); Marshall Ayub 29 (45); Al-Amin Hossain 6/41 (14 overs)

Khulna Division won by 398 runs
Khan Shaheb Osman Ali Stadium, Fatullah
Umpires: Anisur Rahman and Gazi Sohel
Player of the match: Al-Amin Hossain (Khulna Division) and Anamul Haque (Khulna Division)

- Dhaka Metropolis won the toss and elected to field.
- Hasanuzzaman (Khulna Division) made his first-class debut.

3–6 January 2017
Scorecard

Dhaka Division	v	Barisal Division
588/6d (152.5 overs); Taibur Rahman 242 (302); Tawhidul Islam 5/87 (20.5 overs)		189 (39.5 overs); Salman Hossain 47 (53); Shahadat Hossain 4/53 (11 overs)
		321 (84.5 overs) (f/o); Shahriar Nafees 104 (143); Dewan Sabbir 3/25 (5.5 overs)

Dhaka Division won by an innings and 78 runs
Sylhet International Cricket Stadium, Sylhet
Umpires: Mahfuzur Rahman and Masudur Rahman
Player of the match: Taibur Rahman (Dhaka Division)

- Barisal Division won the toss and elected to field.
- Saif Hassan (Dhaka Division) became the youngest player in Bangladesh to score a first-class double century when he made 204 in the first innings.

=== Tier 2 ===
Points table

Team	Pld	W	L	D	A	Pts
Rangpur Division	6	3	0	3	0	72
Rajshahi Division	6	3	0	3	0	65
Sylhet Division	6	0	3	3	0	35
Chittagong Division	6	0	3	3	0	33

- Top placed team promoted to Tier 1 for 2017–18 National Cricket League.

25–28 September 2016
Scorecard

Rajshahi Division	v	Sylhet Division
199 (68 overs); Farhad Hossain 46 (88); Abu Jayed 5/59 (17 overs)		175 (56 overs); Ruman Ahmed 44 (111); Farhad Reza 3/46 (13 overs)
120/4 (49 overs); Myshukur Rahaman 42 (94); Ebadot Hossain 2/12 (5 overs)

Match drawn
Shahid Kamruzzaman Stadium, Rajshahi
Umpires: Manjurul Islam and Shafiuddin Ahmed
Player of the match: Abu Jayed (Sylhet Division)

- Sylhet Division won the toss and elected to field.
- Ebadot Hossain and Shahanur Rahman (Sylhet Division) both made their first-class debuts.

25–28 September 2016
Scorecard

Chittagong Division	v	Rangpur Division
368 (106.2 overs); Yasir Ali 90 (151); Alauddin Babu 3/73 (19 overs)		355 (103.2 overs); Tanveer Haider 97 (180); Yeasin Arafat 5/65 (20.2 overs)
251 (66.5 overs); Mominul Haque 62 (85); Suhrawadi Shuvo 5/50 (15)		224/5 (43 overs); Mahmudul Hasan 85* (89); Yeasin Arafat 2/48 (11 overs)

Match drawn
Sylhet International Cricket Stadium, Sylhet
Umpires: Morshed Ali Khan and Shyful Islam
Player of the match: Yeasin Arafat (Chittagong Division)

- Rangpur Division won the toss and elected to field.
- Hossain Ali and Yeasin Arafat (Chittagong Division) both made their first-class debuts.
- Yeasin Arafat took his maiden five-wicket haul in a first-class match.

2–5 October 2016
Scorecard

Chittagong Division	v	Rajshahi Division
141 (54.1 overs); Irfan Sukkur 28 (49); Farhad Reza 4/45 (14.4 overs)		558/9d (136.5 overs); Mizanur Rahman 144 (163); Arif Ahmed 4/117 (40 overs)
175 (56.2 overs); Yasir Ali 78* (133); Habibur Rahman 3/27 (14 overs)

Rajshahi Division won by an innings and 242 runs
Shahid Kamruzzaman Stadium, Rajshahi
Umpires: Mozahiduzzaman and Shafiuddin Ahmed
Player of the match: Mizanur Rahman (Rajshahi Division)

- Chittagong Division won the toss and elected to bat.
- Rony Chowdhury (Chittagong Division) made his first-class debut.
- This was Rajshahi Division's biggest victory in a first-class match.

2–5 October 2016
Scorecard

Rangpur Division	v	Sylhet Division
217 (87.4 overs); Dhiman Ghosh 45 (112); Alok Kapali 3/43 (17 overs)		247 (93 overs); Zakir Hasan 112 (203); Sanjit Saha 3/55 (21 overs)
183 (52.5 overs); Sajedul Islam 44* (60); Shahanur Rahman 4/44 (17 overs)		97 (34 overs); Imtiaz Hossain 26 (25); Suhrawadi Shuvo 7/45 (15 overs)

Rangpur Division won by 56 runs
Sylhet International Cricket Stadium, Sylhet
Umpires: Moniruzzaman and Sohrab Hossain
Player of the match: Suhrawadi Shuvo (Rangpur Division)

- Rangpur Division won the toss and elected to bat.

8–11 October 2016
Scorecard

Rangpur Division	v	Rajshahi Division
234 (77.4 overs); Tanveer Haider 53 (108); Farhad Reza 3/59 (23 overs)		268 (82.4 overs); Junaid Siddique 126 (177); Saddam Hossain 4/46 (16.4 overs)
233/7 (79 overs); Saymon Ahmed 94 (133); Sunzamul Islam 4/106 (31 overs)

Match drawn
Bangladesh Krira Shikkha Protisthan No 3 Ground, Savar
Umpires: Asadur Rahman and Shafiuddin Ahmed
Player of the match: Junaid Siddique (Rajshahi Division)

- Rajshahi Division won the toss and elected to field.

8–11 October 2016
Scorecard

Sylhet Division	v	Chittagong Division
444 (139.2 overs); Alok Kapali 137 (249); Mohammad Saifuddin 3/63 (24.2 overs)		315 (101.2 overs); Yasir Ali 95 (198); Shahanur Rahman 5/66 (24 overs)
243/5d (42 overs); Zakir Hasan 86 (104); Arif Ahmed 3/85 (16)		146/9 (57.3 overs); Saeed Sarkar 68 (118); Rahatul Ferdous 5/48 (24.3 overs)

Match drawn
Khan Shaheb Osman Ali Stadium, Fatullah
Umpires: Moniruzzaman and Rezwan Parvez
Player of the match: Shahanur Rahman (Sylhet Division)

- Chittagong Division won the toss and elected to field.
- Saeed Sarkar (Chittagong Division) made his first-class debut.

20–23 December 2016
Scorecard

Rangpur Division	v	Chittagong Division
450 (108); Suhrawadi Shuvo 121 (204); Mohammad Saifuddin 4/93 (21 overs)		182 (58 overs); Irfan Sukkur 47 (91); Saddam Hossain 3/36 (12 overs)
33/0 (5.2 overs); Saymon Ahmed 18* (12)		297 (99.3 overs) (f/o); Yasir Ali 58 (86); Ariful Haque 4/34 (14.3 overs)

Rangpur Division won by 10 wickets
Sylhet International Cricket Stadium, Sylhet
Umpires: Sohrab Hossain and Tanvir Ahmed
Player of the match: Suhrawadi Shuvo (Rangpur Division)

- Chittagong Division won the toss and elected to field.
- Saddam Hossain (Rangpur Division) made his first-class debut.

20–23 December 2016
Scorecard

Rajshahi Division	v	Sylhet Division
204 (65.5 overs); Farhad Hossain 35 (90); Abu Jayed 6/48 (16.5 overs)		219 (72.1 overs); Abul Hasan 59* (72); Farhad Reza 5/91 (30 overs)
344 (92.5 overs); Farhad Hossain 132 (234); Abu Jayed 3/77 (20 overs)		178 (61 overs); Rajin Saleh 75 (126); Sunzamul Islam 3/15 (6 overs)

Rajshahi Division won by 151 runs
Shaheed Chandu Stadium, Bogra
Umpires: Nadir Shah and Sharfuddoula
Player of the match: Farhad Hossain (Rajshahi Division)

- Sylhet Division won the toss and elected to field.

27–30 December 2016
Scorecard

Sylhet Division	v	Rangpur Division
272 (115 overs); Jaker Ali 88 (194); Suhrawadi Shuvo 3/72 (31 overs)		398/9d (119 overs); Nasir Hossain 201 (343); Abu Jayed 5/112 (29 overs)
150 (58.4 overs); Alok Kapali 35 (50); Sajidul Islam 3/34 (17 overs)		27/0 (2.3 overs); Saymon Ahmed 14* (6)

Rangpur Division won by 10 wickets
Sylhet International Cricket Stadium, Sylhet
Umpires: Akteruzzaman and Morshed Ali Khan
Player of the match: Nasir Hossain (Rangpur Division)

- Sylhet Division won the toss and elected to bat.
- Jaker Ali (Sylhet Division) made his first-class debut.

27–30 December 2016
Scorecard

Chittagong Division	v	Rajshahi Division
315 (103.2 overs); Tasamul Haque 104 (251); Saqlain Sajib 5/54 (29.2 overs)		230 (72.2 overs); Jahurul Islam 90 (158); Kazi Kamrul Islam 4/74 (25 overs)
299/3d (96.4 overs); Yasir Ali 105* (187); Saqlain Sajib 2/102 (40 overs)		387/2 (65.2 overs); Farhad Hossain 113* (77); Iftekhar Sajjad 1/79 (15 overs)

Rajshahi Division won by 8 wickets
Zohur Ahmed Chowdhury Stadium, Chittagong
Umpires: Mahfuzur Rahman and Tanvir Ahmed
Player of the match: Junaid Siddique (Rajshahi Division)

- Rajshahi Division won the toss and elected to field.
- Mojibur Rahman (Chittagong Division) made his first-class debut.

3–6 January 2017
Scorecard

Rajshahi Division	v	Rangpur Division
191 (54.2 overs); Farhad Hossain 59 (79); Saddam Hossain 5/57 (14 overs)		351 (94.5 overs); Dhiman Ghosh 97 (123); Mamun Hossain 5/81 (19.5 overs)
403/7d (86.4 overs); Myshukur Rahaman 160 (212); Saddam Hossain 2/47 (13 overs)		196/2 (44.2 overs); Jahid Javed 70 (105); Mamun Hossain 1/23 (6 overs)

Match drawn
Zohur Ahmed Chowdhury Stadium, Chittagong
Umpires: Nadir Shah and Sharfuddoula
Player of the match: Myshukur Rahaman (Rajshahi Division)

- Rangpur Division won the toss and elected to field.

3–6 January 2017
Scorecard

Sylhet Division	v	Chittagong Division
555/7d (143 overs); Alok Kapali 200* (266); Iftekhar Sajjad 3/105 (30 overs)		320 (100.5 overs); Nafees Iqbal 99 (219); Abu Jayed 5/63 (19.3 overs)
165/7d (25 overs); Ruman Ahmed 68 (66); Iftekhar Sajjad 3/53 (6 overs)		261/7 (88 overs); Sazzadul Haque 54 (112); Rahatul Ferdous 3/71 (23 overs)

Match drawn
Bangladesh Krira Shikkha Protisthan No 3 Ground, Savar
Umpires: Mozahiduzzaman and Tanvir Ahmed
Player of the match: Alok Kapali (Sylhet Division)

- Sylhet Division won the toss and elected to bat.
- Nayeem Hasan (Chittagong Division) made his first-class debut.
