= List of Bangladesh under-19 international cricketers =

This is presenting a complete list in alphabetical order of the cricketers who have played for the Bangladesh national under-19 cricket team. Like other team lists, details are the player's name followed by his years active in the Under-19 team, current players to the end of the 2015–16 season.

Please to note that the list includes players who have not (yet) gone on to appear in first-class or List A cricket. These players' names are unlinked, as Under-19 players only they are not complying with WP:NCRIC.

== A ==
- Md Rabiul Islam Robi (2014–15 to 2015–16)
- Abdul Qayium (2014)
- Abdur Rashid (2010–11)
- Abu Hider (2012 to 2013–14)
- Abu Jayed (2009 to 2012)
- Abu Sayeem (2013 to 2013–14)
- Abul Bashar (2003–04)
- Abul Hasan (2009 to 2009–10)
- Aftab Ahmed (2001–02 to 2004)
- Aftabul Islam (1994–95)
- Ahsanullah Hasan (1997–98)
- Al-Amin Abdullah (1989–90)
- Al-Amin (2011–12 to 2012)
- Alauddin Babu (2009 to 2009–10)
- Ali Arman (2001–02)
- Al Sahariar (1995–96 to 1997–98)
- Aminul Islam Bulbul (1989–90)
- Amit Majumder (2007–08 to 2009–10)
- Anamul Haque (2009 to 2012)
- Anisur Rahman (1989–90)
- Anwar Hossain Monir (1999–2000)
- Arafat Sunny (2003–04)
- Ariful Haque (2007)
- Ariful Islam (2015–16)
- Arman Badshah (2009–10)
- Arman Hossain (1999–2000)
- Ashim Chowdhury (2004)
- Ashiqul Islam (2007–08)
- Ashiqur Rahman (2001–02)
- Ashiqur Rahman, born 1986 (2003–04)
- Ashraful Aziz (2007 to 2007–08)
- Ashraful Hossain (2007–08)
- Asif Ahmed (2009 to 2012)
- Aslam Hossain (2010–11 to 2012)
- Aslam Khan (2005–06)
- Atiar Rahman (1994–95 to 1995–96)

== D ==
- Dewan Sabbir (2011–12 to 2012)
- Dhiman Ghosh (2003–04 to 2004)
- Dolar Mahmud (2005–06 to 2007–08)

== E ==
- Ehsanul Haque (1997–98)
- Enamul Haque (2003–04 to 2004)

== F ==
- Fahim Muntasir (1997–98 to 1999)

== G ==
- Gazi Salahuddin (2001–02)
- Golam Kibria (2007 to 2007–08)
- Golam Mortaza (1997–98 to 1999)

== H ==
- Habibul Bashar (1989–90)
- Halim Shah (1989–90)
- Hamidul Islam (2007 to 2007–08)
- Hannan Sarkar (1997–98 to 1999–2000)
- Hasibul Haque (2001–02)
- Hasibul Hossain (1994–95 to 1995–96)
- Humayun Kabir (2005–06)

== I ==
- Iftekhar Nayem (2007)
- Iftikharul Islam (2003–04)
- Imamul Hossain (2009 to 2009–10)
- Imran Ahmed (1999)
- Imran Rahim (1999)
- Irfan Shukkur (2009)
- Ishraq Sonet (2004 to 2005–06)

== J ==
- Jahangir Alam (1989–90)
- Jakir Ali (2014–15 to 2015–16)
- Jashimuddin (2011–12 to 2013–14)
- Javed Omar (1989–90 to 1994)
- Jewel Hossain (1995–96)
- Joyraz Sheik (2013 to 2015–16)
- Jubair Hossain (2010–11 to 2013–14)

== K ==
- Kamrul Islam Imon (2003–04)
- Kamrul Islam Rabbi (2009 to 2009–10)
- Kazi Hasibul Haque (2001–02)
- Kazi Kamrul Islam (2005–06)
- Kazi Anik (2014–15)
- Khaled Mahmud (1989–90)
- Khaled Mashud (1994)
- Kuntal Chandra (1999–2000)

== L ==
- Liton Das (2010–11 to 2013–14)

== M ==
- Mafizul Islam (1994)
- Mahbubur Rahman (1989–90)
- Mahfuz Kabir (1999–2000)
- Mahmudul Hasan (2007 to 2009–10)
- Mahmudullah (2003–04)
- Manjural Islam (1997–98)
- Marshall Ayub (2005–06 to 2007–08)
- Mazharul Haque (1999)
- Mehdi Hasan (2005–06)
- Mehedi Hasan Bappy (2013)
- Mehedi Hasan Milon (2013)
- Mehedi Hasan Miraz (2013 to 2015–16)
- Mehedi Hasan Rana (2013 to 2015–16)
- Mehrab Hossain senior (1994 to 1997–98)
- Mehrab Hossain junior (2005–06)
- Mithun Ali (2007 to 2007–08)
- Mobashir Khan (2009–10)
- Mohammad Al-Amin (1994)
- Mohammad Ali (1989–90)
- Mohammad Ashraful (1999–2000 to 2001–02)
- Mohammad Azim (2009)
- Mohammad Kalim (1999–2000)
- Mohammad Mostadir (1994 to 1995–96)
- Mohammad Nazmul Hossain (2003–04 to 2004)
- Mohammad Rubel (2009)
- Mohammad Saddam (2013–14)
- Mohammad Saifuddin (2013 to 2015–16)
- Mohammad Salim (1999–2000)
- Mohammad Shakil (2007 to 2007–08)
- Mohammad Shariful (2001–02)
- Mohammad Sukran (2007–08)
- Mohammad Sumon (2013 to 2013–14)
- Mominul Haque (2009 to 2009–10)
- Morshed Alam (1997–98)
- Morshed Ali Khan (1994 to 1995–96)
- Mosaddek Hossain (1999 to 1999–2000)
- Mosaddek Hossain (2010–11 to 2014)
- Mossabbek Hossain (2014–15 to 2015–16)
- Munim Shahriar (2010–11 to 2014–15)
- Murad Khan (2001–02)
- Mushfiqur Rahim (2004 to 2005–06)
- Mushfiqur Rahman (1997–98)
- Mustafizur Rahman (2013 to 2013–14)

== N ==
- Nabil Samad (2005–06)
- Nadif Chowdhury (2003–04 to 2004)
- Nadimuddin (2007–08)
- Naeem Islam senior (2003–04)
- Naeem Islam junior (2010–11 to 2012)
- Nafees Iqbal (2001–02 to 2004)
- Nahid Hasan (2013–14 to 2014–15)
- Nahidul Haque (1999 to 1999–2000)
- Naimur Rahman (1994 to 1995–96)
- Nasir Hossain (2007 to 2007–08)
- Nasum Ahmed (2010–11 to 2012)
- Nazimuddin (2003–04 to 2004)
- Nazmul Hossain Milon (2005–06)
- Nazmul Hossain Shanto (2013 to 2015–16)
- Nazmus Sadat (2005–06)
- Niamur Rashid (1994–95)
- Nihaduzzaman (2013 to 2014–15)
- Noor Hossain (2009 to 2012)
- Nurul Hasan (2009 to 2012)
- Nuruzzaman (2011–12)

== P ==
- Pinak Ghosh (2014–15 to 2015–16)
- Prosenjit Das (2013–14 to 2015)

== R ==
- Hasibul Hasan Rakib (unlimited time)
- Rahatul Ferdous (2013 to 2013–14)
- Raihan Anas (2007 to 2007–08)
- Rajin Saleh (1999 to 1999–2000)
- Rakib Hasan (1994)
- Ranjan Das (1999 to 1999–2000)
- Raqibul Hasan (2005–06)
- Rashidul Haque (1997–98)
- Rezaul Haque (1999)
- Rezaul Islam (2005–06)
- Rifat Pradhan (2013 to 2015–16)
- Rony Talukdar (2007 to 2007–08)
- Rubaiyat Haque (2003–04 to 2004)
- Rubel Hossain (2007 to 2007–08)

== S ==
- Sabbir Khan (1997–98)
- Sabbir Rahman (2009 to 2009–10)
- Saddam Hossain (2009)
- Saddam Hossain (2010–11)
- Saddam Khan (2009)
- Sadik Hasan (1999)
- Saeed Sarkar (2013 to 2015–16)
- Saghir Hossain (2003–04)
- Saif Hassan (2014–15 to 2015–16)
- Saiful Islam (1989–90)
- Saikat Ali (2007–08 to 2009–10)
- Sajal Chowdhury (1994 to 1997–98)
- Sajid Hasan (1994–95 to 1995–96)
- Sajjad Ahmed (1994–95)
- Saleh Ahmed (2014 to 2015–16)
- Salman Hossain (2010–11 to 2012)
- Sanjit Saha (2014 to 2015–16)
- Selim Shahid (1989–90)
- Shadman Islam (2013 to 2014–15)
- Shafaq Al Zabir (2001–02)
- Shafiul Alam (2001–02)
- Shafiul Hayat (2014–15 to 2015–16)
- Shahadat Hossain, Albahani Ltd (2009)
- Shahadat Hossain (2003–04 to 2004)
- Shahanur Rahman (2014–15 to 2015)
- Shahnawaz Kabir (1997–98)
- Shahriar Hossain (1994 to 1995–96)
- Shahriar Nafees (2003–04 to 2004)
- Shaker Ahmed (2009 to 2009–10)
- Shakib Al Hasan (2005–06)
- Shamsul Huda (1989–90)
- Shamsur Rahman (2004 to 2005–06)
- Shariful Haque (1994–95)
- Shohag Raza (2009)
- Shourabh Paul (2008–2009)
- Sifat Islam (2013–14 to 2014)
- Sirajullah Khadim (2005–06)
- Sohail Islam (1994 to 1994–95)
- Soumya Sarkar (2009–10 to 2012)
- Subashis Roy (2007 to 2007–08)
- Suhrawadi Shuvo (2005–06 to 2007–08)
- Syed Rasel (2001–02)

== T ==
- Taibur Rahman (2009)
- Taijul Islam (2009)
- Talha Jubair (2001–02 to 2004)
- Tamim Iqbal (2005–06 to 2007–08)
- Tanveer Khan (1997–98)
- Tanvirul Islam (1997–98)
- Taposh Ghosh (2007 to 2007–08)
- Tarikul Hasan (1999 to 1999–2000)
- Tasamul Haque (2009 to 2009–10)
- Taskin Ahmed (2010–11 to 2012)
- Touhid Tareq (2010–11 to 2011–12)
- Towhid Hossain (1997–98)
- Tushar Imran (1999)

== W ==
- Waseluddin Ahmed (2001–02)

== Y ==
- Yasir Ali (2010–11 to 2013–14)

== Z ==
- Zabid Hossain (2007 to 2007–08)
- Zahed Zabed (2010–11)
- Zakaria Imtiaz (1994 to 1994–95)
- Zakaria Masud (2010–11 to 2013–14)
- Zakir Hasan (2013–14 to 2015–16)
- Ziaur Rahman (2003–04)
