= 2013 Bangladesh Premier League player auction =

The players auction for the 2013 Bangladesh Premier League was held on December 20, 2012, at the Radisson Blu Water Garden Hotel, Dhaka. Domestic players were set a base price between $10,000 and $50,000, while international players were set a base price between $15,000 and $75,000. No Indian players were included in 2013 BPL edition.

== Player list ==
=== Domestic players ===
Domestic players in the top three categories for the auction are listed below:

- Golden ($50,000):
1. Tamim Iqbal
2. Shakib Al Hasan
3. Mahmudullah
4. Mushfiqur Rahim
- Category A ($30,000):
1. Mohammad Ashraful
2. Anamul Haque
3. Nasir Hossain
4. Shohag Gazi
5. Ziaur Rahman
6. Mashrafe Mortaza
7. Abdur Razzak
- Category B ($20,000):
1. Nazim Uddin
2. Jahurul Islam
3. Shahriar Nafees
4. Zunaied Siddique
5. Imrul Kayes
6. Mominul Haque
7. Alok Kapali
8. Farhad Reza
9. Naeem Islam
10. Shahadat Hossain
11. Rubel Hossain
12. Shafiul Islam
13. Abul Hasan
14. Nazmul Hossain
15. Elias Sunny
16. Arafat Sunny
17. Mosharraf Hossain
18. Enamul Haque Jr

=== International players ===
International players in the two top categories for the auction are listed below. Players with a strike through their name were withdrawn on the day of the auction. Yasir Arafat, Ryan ten Doeschate and Peter Trego were added to Category A on auction day.

- Golden ($75,000):
1. Shahid Afridi
2. Saeed Ajmal
3. Imran Nazir
4. Luke Wright
5. Owais Shah
6. Dimitri Mascarenhas
7. Tino Best
8. Sunil Narine
9. Dwayne Bravo
10. Marlon Samuels
11. Andre Russell
12. Fidel Edwards
13. Alfonso Thomas
14. Shaun Tait
15. Dirk Nannes
16. Brad Hodge
- Category A ($50,000):
1. Umar Gul
2. Abdul Razzaq
3. Wahab Riaz
4. Mohammad Sami
5. Kamran Akmal
6. Umar Akmal
7. Azhar Mahmood
8. Ravi Bopara
9. Phil Mustard
10. Dwayne Smith
11. Shivnarine Chanderpaul
12. Yasir Arafat
13. Ryan ten Doeschate
14. Peter Trego

== Sold players ==
Player	Team	Winning bid	Base price
Shakib Al Hasan	Dhaka Gladiators	$365,000	$50,000
Imran Nazir	Chittagong Kings	$280,000	$75,000
Shahid Afridi	Dhaka Gladiators	$275,000	$75,000
Nasir Hossain	Rangpur Riders	$208,137	$30,000
Azhar Mahmood	Barisal Burners	$206,000	$75,000
Mushfiqur Rahim	Sylhet Royals	$205,000	$50,000
Tamim Iqbal	Duronto Rajshahi	$165,000	$50,000
Sohag Gazi	Sylhet Royals	$141,000	$30,000
Mashrafe Mortaza	Dhaka Gladiators	$141,000	$30,000
Ziaur Rahman	Duronto Rajshahi	$137,000	$30,000
Mominul Haque	Sylhet Royals	$127,000	$20,000
Brad Hodge	Barisal Burners	$125,000	$75,000
Ravi Bopara	Chittagong Kings	$125,000	$50,000
Mahmudullah	Chittagong Kings	$125,000	$50,000
Anamul Haque	Dhaka Gladiators	$121,000	$30,000
Abul Hasan	Duronto Rajshahi	$121,000	$20,000
Enamul Haque Jr	Chittagong Kings	$120,000	$20,000
Saeed Ajmal	Barisal Burners	$115,000	$75,000
Dwayne Bravo	Chittagong Kings	$115,000	$75,000
Andre Russell	Sylhet Royals	$115,000	$75,000
Lasith Malinga	Dhaka Gladiators	$115,000	$75,000
Marlon Samuels	Duronto Rajshahi	$115,000	$75,000
Jacob Oram	Chittagong Kings	$111,000	$50,000
Ahmed Shehzad	Khulna Royal Bengals	$111,000	$30,000
Jahurul Islam	Duronto Rajshahi	$111,000	$20,000
Ryan Ten Doeschate	Chittagong Kings	$100,000	$50,000
Elias Sunny	Barisal Burners	$106,000	$20,000
Arafat Sunny	Chittagong Kings	$100,000	$20,000
Abdur Razzak	Rangpur Riders	$92,777	$30,000
Abdul Razzaq	Duronto Rajshahi	$91,000	$50,000
Mosharraf Hossain	Dhaka Gladiators	$91,000	$20,000
Shoaib Malik	Khulna Royal Bengals	$85,000	$75,000
Naeem Islam	Chittagong Kings	$85,000	$20,000
Mohammad Sami	Duronto Rajshahi	$83,000	$50,000
Alok Kapali	Barisal Burners	$83,000	$20,000
Shahzaib Hasan	Duronto Rajshahi	$76,000	$30,000
Luke Wright	Dhaka Gladiators	$75,000	$75,000
Owais Shah	Dhaka Gladiators	$75,000	$75,000
Tino Best	Sylhet Royals	$75,000	$75,000
Sunil Narine	Barisal Burners	$75,000	$75,000
Fidel Edwards	Rangpur Riders	$75,000	$75,000
Tillakaratne Dilshan	Dhaka Gladiators	$75,000	$75,000
Kamran Akmal	Barisal Burners	$75,000	$50,000
Nazmul Hossain	Sylhet Royals	$71,000	$20,000
Dwayne Smith	Sylhet Royals	$70,000	$50,000
Junaid Siddique	Rangpur Riders	$67,757	$20,000
Shafiul Islam	Barisal Burners	$67,000	$20,000
Alex Hales	Duronto Rajshahi	$62,000	$30,000
Umar Gul	Barisal Burners	$60,000	$50,000
Wahab Riaz	Chittagong Kings	$60,000	$50,000
Umar Akmal	Khulna Royal Bengals	$60,000	$50,000
Mohammad Ashraful	Dhaka Gladiators	$60,000	$30,000
Rubel Hossain	Chittagong Kings	$60,000	$20,000
Sharjeel Khan	Rangpur Riders	$59,000	$15,000
Sabbir Rahman	Barisal Burners	$55,000	$10,000
Farhad Reza	Khulna Royal Bengals	$51,505	$20,000
Saqlain Sajib	Dhaka Gladiators	$51,000	$10,000
Hammad Azam	Barisal Burners	$51,000	$15,000
Phil Mustard	Barisal Burners	$50,000	$50,000
Kevon Cooper	Chittagong Kings	$50,000	$30,000
Kevin O'Brien	Rangpur Riders	$45,000	$30,000
Sanjamul Islam	Khulna Royal Bengals	$45,000	$10,000
Imrul Kayes	Rangpur Riders	$44,010	$20,000
Nazmul Islam	Barisal Burners	$44,000	$10,000
Farhad Hossain	Duronto Rajshahi	$42,000	$10,000
Umar Amin	Khulna Royal Bengals	$40,000	$30,000
Chris Liddle	Dhaka Gladiators	$40,000	$30,000
Shahriar Nafees	Khulna Royal Bengals	$40,000	$20,000
Haris Sohail	Khulna Royal Bengals	$40,000	$15,000
Soumya Sarkar	Dhaka Gladiators	$32,500	$10,000
Suhrawadi Shuvo	Sylhet Royals	$33,000	$10,000
Mithun Ali	Khulna Royal Bengals	$32,000	$10,000
Nurul Hasan	Chittagong Kings	$32,000	$10,000
Alauddin Babu	Barisal Burners	$31,000	$10,000
Awais Zia	Khulna Royal Bengals	$30,000	$30,000
Azeem Ghumman	Sylhet Royals	$30,000	$30,000
Zulfiqar Babar	Sylhet Royals	$30,000	$30,000
Josh Cobb	Dhaka Gladiators	$30,000	$30,000
Jason Roy	Chittagong Kings	$30,000	$30,000
Darren Stevens	Dhaka Gladiators	$30,000	$30,000
Hamilton Masakadza	Sylhet Royals	$30,000	$30,000
Brendan Taylor	Chittagong Kings	$30,000	$30,000
Paul Stirling	Sylhet Royals	$30,000	$15,000
Nazmul Hossain Milon	Sylhet Royals	$26,000	$10,000
Taijul Islam	Duronto Rajshahi	$26,000	$10,000
Rikki Wessels	Khulna Royal Bengals	$25,000	$15,000
Nazim Uddin	Khulna Royal Bengals	$25,000	$20,000
Shahadat Hossain	Khulna Royal Bengals	$20,000	$20,000
Shuvagata Hom	Barisal Burners	$18,000	$10,000
Marshall Ayub	Chittagong Kings	$16,000	$10,000
Nabil Samad	Khulna Royal Bengals	$16,000	$10,000
Kabir Ali	Barisal Burners	$15,000	$15,000
Shane Harwood	Khulna Royal Bengals	$15,000	$15,000
Khalid Latif	Duronto Rajshahi	$15,000	$15,000
Babar Azam	Sylhet Royals	$15,000	$15,000
Sohail Ahmed	Sylhet Royals	$15,000	$15,000
Raza Ali	Rangpur Riders	$15,000	$15,000
Anwar Ali	Rangpur Riders	$15,000	$15,000
Bilawal Bhatti	Khulna Royal Bengals	$15,000	$15,000
Saeed Anwar Jr	Chittagong Kings	$15,000	$15,000
Kaushal Lokuarachchi	Dhaka Gladiators	$15,000	$15,000
Sean Ervine	Duronto Rajshahi	$15,000	$15,000
Dhiman Ghosh	Rangpur Riders	$14,000	$10,000
Mizanur Rahman	Khulna Royal Bengals	$14,000	$10,000
Raqibul Hasan	Dhaka Gladiators	$10,000	$10,000
Aftab Ahmed	Chittagong Kings	$10,000	$10,000
Mohammad Sharif	Rangpur Riders	$10,000	$10,000
Dolar Mahmud	Khulna Royal Bengals	$10,000	$10,000
Mahbubul Alam	Dhaka Gladiators	$10,000	$10,000
Shamsur Rahman	Rangpur Riders	$10,000	$10,000
Al-Amin	Barisal Burners	$10,000	$10,000
Iftekhar Nayem	Barisal Burners	$10,000	$10,000
Mukhtar Ali	Duronto Rajshahi	$10,000	$10,000
Liton Das	Dhaka Gladiators	$10,000	$10,000
Taposh Ghosh	Rangpur Riders	$10,000	$10,000
Shaker Ahmed	Duronto Rajshahi	$10,000	$10,000
Monir Hossain	Duronto Rajshahi	$10,000	$10,000
Imtiaz Hossain	Sylhet Royals	$10,000	$10,000
Jubair Ahmed	Barisal Burners	$10,000	$10,000
Mehedi Maruf	Rangpur Riders	$10,000	$10,000
Jupita Ghosh	Sylhet Royals	$10,000	$10,000

== Unsold players ==
The following is a list of players who remained unsold in the auction.

1. Aaron O'Brien
2. Cameron Borgas
3. Dirk Nannes
4. Lee Carseldine
5. Abdul Majid
6. Abu Jayed
7. Abu Haider
8. Abul Bashar
9. Amit Kumar
10. Amit Majumder
11. Arafat Salahuddin
12. Ariful Haque
13. Arman Badsha
14. Arman Hossain
15. Asif Ahmed
16. Avishek Mitra
17. Bishawnath Halder
18. Delwar Hossain
19. Dewan Sabbir
20. Ezaz Ahmed
21. Faisal Hossain
22. Fariduddin Masud
23. Fazle Rabbi
24. Kamrul Islam Rabbi
25. Kazi Kamrul Islam
26. Mahbubul Karim
27. Mahmudul Hasan
28. Monir Hossain
29. Monwer Hossain
30. Murad Khan
31. Maisur Rahman
32. Nadif Chowdhury
33. Nafees Iqbal
34. Nasir Uddin Faruque
35. Nazmus Sadat
36. Noor Hossain
37. Robiul Islam
38. Rajin Saleh
39. Rassal Al-Mamun
40. Rejaul Karim Rajib
41. Rony Talukdar
42. Rubiayat Haq
43. Saikat Ali
44. Sajidul Islam
45. Saju Datta
46. Sahgir Hossain
47. Sharifullah
48. Shuvashish Roy
49. Syed Rasel
50. Talha Jubair
51. Tanbir Hayder
52. Tareq Aziz
53. Tarik Ahmed
54. Tasamul Haque
55. Taskin Ahmed
56. Tushar Imran
57. Ashley Nurse
58. Corey Collymore
59. Kirk Edwards
60. Sulieman Benn
61. Rizwan Cheema
62. Andy Carter
63. Bilal Shafayat
64. Chris Schofield
65. Dimitri Mascarenhas
66. Jack Shantry
67. Majid Haq
68. Peter Trego
69. Rikki Clarke
70. Sajid Mahmood
71. Tim Groenewald
72. Usman Afzaal
73. Andre Fletcher
74. Assad Fudadin
75. Shivnarine Chanderpaul
76. Irfan Ahmed
77. Gary Wilson
78. Niall O'Brien
79. Brendon Nash
80. Danza Hyatt
81. Ricardo Powell
82. Xavier Marshall
83. Carlton Baugh
84. Sheldon Cottrell
85. Alexei Kervezee
86. Mudassar Bukhari
87. Stephan Myburgh
88. Michael Swart
89. Tonito Willett
90. Adeel Malik
91. Adnan Rajak
92. Adnan Raza
93. Ali Asad
94. Ali Khan
95. Anop Ravi
96. Asad Shafiq
97. Asif Raza
98. Babar Naeem
99. Bilawal Bhatti
100. Haris Sohail
101. Iftikhar Anjum
102. Junaid Zia
103. Kamran Shahzad
104. Kamran Younis
105. Khurram Manzoor
106. Mansoor Amjad
107. Mohammad Irshad
108. Mohammad Khalil
109. Mohammad Salman
110. Naved Arif
111. Rahat Ali
112. Raza Ali Dar
113. Rehan Riaz
114. Saeed Anwar Jr
115. Samiullah Khan
116. Sarfraz Ahmed
117. Shahid Yousuf
118. Shakeel Ansar
119. Shoaib Khan
120. Sohail Ahmed
121. Yasir Arafat
122. Zohaib Khan
123. Kyle Coetzer
124. Calum MacLeod
125. Preston Mommsen
126. Alfonso Thomas
127. Charles Peiterson
128. Neil Carter
129. Kaushal Lokuarachchi
130. Malinga Bandara
131. Akeal Hosein
132. Rayad Emrit
133. Samuel Badree
134. Denesh Ramdin
135. Charles Coventry
136. Elton Chigumbura
137. Gary Ballance
138. Malcolm Waller
139. Prosper Utseya
140. Vusi Sibanda

== Post-auction signings ==
Franchises are able sign players after the BPL auction, as replacement of contracted players who are not available to play due to injuries and national commitments. Under BPL rules, the replacements have to be chosen from the pool of players who went unsold in the auction, and cannot be paid more than the players they are replacing, though they can be paid less. The Pakistan Cricket Board refused to issue No Objection Certificates (NOC) to any of its player who were selected by the BPL franchises and therefore Pakistani cricketers will not take part in the 2013 Bangladesh Premier League.

Signed player	Replaced player	Team	Cost	Reason for replacement
Alfonso Thomas	Lasith Malinga	Dhaka Gladiators	$75,000	Injury
Shivnarine Chanderpaul	Andre Russell	Sylhet Royals	$30,000	Injury
Dirk Nannes	Tino Best	Sylhet Royals	$75,000	Injury
	Mohammad Hafeez	Khulna Royal Bengals	$15,000	No NOC and Hafeez was also Extra Sign.
Kieron Pollard		Dhaka Gladiators		Extra signing
Shehan Jayasuriya		Chittagong Kings		Extra signing
Dilhara Lokuhettige		Chittagong Kings		Extra signing
Isuru Udana		Duronto Rajshahi		Extra signing
Charles Coventry		Duronto Rajshahi		Extra signing
Cameron Borgas		Rangpur Riders		Extra signing
Simon Katich	Marlon Samuels	Duronto Rajshahi	$50,000	Injury
Dilshan Munaweera	Alex Hales	Duronto Rajshahi	$30,000	National Commitments
David Miller	Imran Nazir	Chittagong Kings	$30,000	No NOC
Chris Gayle	Shahid Afridi	Dhaka Gladiators	$75,000	No NOC
Farveez Maharoof	Saeed Ajmal	Barisal Burners	$50,000	No NOC
	Ahmed Shehzad	Khulna Royal Bengals	$15,000	No NOC
Chamara Kapugedera	Abdul Razzaq	Duronto Rajshahi	$15,000	No NOC
Jehan Mubarak	Shoaib Malik	Khulna Royal Bengals	$30,000	No NOC
Ben Edmondson	Mohammad Sami	Duronto Rajshahi	$50,000	No NOC
Moeen Ali	Shahzaib Hasan	Duronto Rajshahi	$15,000	No NOC
Joe Denly	Kamran Akmal	Barisal Burners	$15,000	No NOC
Hamid Hasan	Umar Gul	Barisal Burners	$30,000	No NOC
Shaun Tait	Wahab Riaz	Chittagong Kings	$75,000	No NOC
Lou Vincent	Umar Akmal	Khulna Royal Bengals	$50,000	No NOC
Niall O'Brien	Sharjeel Khan	Rangpur Riders	$30,000	No NOC
Mahmudul Hasan	Hammad Azam	Barisal Burners	$10,000	No NOC
Travis Birt	Umar Amin	Khulna Royal Bengals	$50,000	No NOC
Samuel Badree	Haris Sohail	Khulna Royal Bengals	$40000	No NOC
Daniel Harris	Awais Zia	Khulna Royal Bengals	$50,000	No NOC
Samiullah Shenwari	Azeem Ghumman	Sylhet Royals	$15,000	No NOC
Nadif Chowdhury	Zulfiqar Babar	Sylhet Royals	$10,000	No NOC
	Khalid Latif	Duronto Rajshahi	$30,000	No NOC
Elton Chigumbura	Babar Azam	Sylhet Royals	$30,000	No NOC
Mohammad Nabi	Sohail Ahmed	Sylhet Royals	$15,000	No NOC
Dimitri Mascarenhas	Raza Ali	Rangpur Riders	$75,000	No NOC
James Pattinson	Anwar Ali	Rangpur Riders	$50,000	No NOC
Shapoor Zadran	Bilawal Bhatti	Khulna Royal Bengals	$15,000	No NOC
Krishmar Santokie	Shane Harwood	Khulna Royal Bengals	$15,000	Injury

== See also ==
- 2013 Bangladesh Premier League
- 2012-13 Bangladeshi cricket season
