= 2013 Bangladesh Premier League squads =

The Bangladesh Premier League (BPL) is a professional Twenty20 cricket league in Bangladesh. In 2013, seven teams competed.

== Dhaka Gladiators ==
Dhaka Gladiators squad for 2013.

Dhaka Gladiators squad
Batsmen: 23 Tillakaratne Dilshan; 333 Chris Gayle; 99 Owais Shah; 71 Raqibul Hasan; 108 Ashik Chowdhury; 12 Soumya Sarkar; 05 Josh Cobb; All-rounders: 20 Kaushal Lokuarachchi; 75 Shakib Al Hasan; 06 Luke Wright; 03 Darren Stevens; 55 Kieron Pollard	Wicket-keepers: 31 Anamul Haque; 19 Liton Das; Bowlers: 02 Mashrafe Mortaza (Captain); 08 Alfonso Thomas; 11 Chris Liddle; 70 Mosharraf Hossain; 65 Mahbubul Alam; 96 Saqlain Sajib	Support staff: Head coach: Ian Pont; Consultant: Habibul Bashar; Bowling coach: Mohammad Rafique

== Khulna Royal Bengal ==
Khulna Royal Bengals squad for 2013.

Khulna Royal Bengals squad
Batsmen: 06 Nazimuddin; 74 Shahriar Nafees (Captain); -- Travis Birt; 13 Mizanur Rahman; 68 Lou Vincent; 16 Daniel Harris; 10 Jehan Mubarak; All-rounders: 69 Farhad Reza; 68 Samiullah Shenwari; 77 Asif Ahmed	Wicket-keepers: 10 Rikki Wessels; 68 Daniel Smith; 77 Mithun Ali; Bowlers: 10 Shahadat Hossain; -- Shane Harwood; 10 Samuel Badree; 68 Shapoor Zadran; 10 Krishmar Santokie; 33 Sanjamul Islam; 96 Nabil Samad; 99 Dolar Mahmud; 10 Noor Hossain	Support staff: Manager: Zahid Razzak; Head coach: Robin Singh

== Chittagong Kings ==
Chittagong Kings squad for 2013.

Chittagong Kings squad
Batsmen: 42 Ravi Bopara; 20 Jason Roy; 97 Aftab Ahmed; 08 David Miller; 17 Ariful Haque; All-rounders: 27 Ryan Ten Doeschate; 90 Kevon Cooper; 30 Mahmudullah (Captain); 77 Naeem Islam; 24 Jacob Oram; 07 Marshall Ayub; 78 Mehrab Hossain, Jr.	Wicket-keepers: 10 Brendan Taylor; 18 Nurul Hasan; Bowlers: 34 Rubel Hossain; 32 Shaun Tait; 99 Taskin Ahmed; 12 Arafat Sunny; 45 Enamul Haque Jr	Support staff: Head coach: Waqar Younis; Batting consultant: Brian Lara; Consultant: Minhajul Abedin

== Barisal Burners ==
Barisal Burners squad for 2013.

Barisal Burners squad
Batsmen: 71 Brad Hodge (captain); 51 Shuvagata Hom; 02 Joe Denly; -- Iftekhar Nayem; 07 Jubair Ahmed; All-rounders: 14 Alok Kapali; 11 Azhar Mahmood; 65 Sabbir Rahman; 62 Mahmudul Hasan; 28 Farveez Maharoof	Wicket-keepers: 52 Phil Mustard; Bowlers: 19 Elias Sunny; 13 Shafiul Islam; 53 Kabir Ali; 18 Al Amin; 17 Alauddin Babu; 32 Nazmul Islam Apu; 66 Hamid Hassan	Support staff: Head coach: Sarwar Imran; Assistant coach: Khaled Mahmud; Consultant: Akram Khan

== Rangpur Riders ==
Rangpur Riders squad for 2013.

Rangpur Riders squad
Batsmen: 31 Junaid Siddique; 62 Imrul Kayes; 63 Shamsur Rahman; 04 Maruf Reza; -- Danza Hyatt; 10 Saikat Ali; All-rounders: 17 Dimitri Mascarenhas; 22 Kevin O'Brien; 69 Cameron Borgas; 69 Nasir Hossain; -- Taposh Ghosh	Wicket-keepers: 96 Dhiman Ghosh; 72 Niall O'Brien; Bowlers: 41 Abdur Razzak (Captain); -- James Pattinson; -- Fidel Edwards; 19 Tapash Baisya; 10 Mohammad Sharif; 00 Amit Kumar; 10 Murad Khan; 02 Saju Datta	Support staff: Head coach: Saqlain Mushtaq; Assistant coach: Feilding coach:

== Sylhet Royals ==
Sylhet Royals squad for the season.

Sylhet Royals squad
Batsmen: -- Hamilton Masakadza; 62 Paul Stirling; 25 Nazmul Hossain Milon; 68 Mominul Haque; 06 Shivnarine Chanderpaul; All-rounders: 07 Imtiaz Hossain; 11 Dwayne Smith; -- Mohammad Nabi; 68 Elton Chigumbura; 13 Nadif Chowdhury	Wicket-keepers: 15 Mushfiqur Rahim (Captain); -- Jupiter Ghosh; 10 Jashimuddin; Bowlers: 33 Sohag Gazi; 68 Dirk Nannes; 99 Nazmul Hossain; 31 Suhrawadi Shuvo; 13 Sulieman Benn; 14 Biswanath Halder; 00 Sajidul Islam	Support staff: Head coach: Mohammad Salahuddin; Fielding coach: Jason Swift; Consultant: Naimur Rahman; Consultant: Rafiqul Alam

== Duronto Rajshahi ==
Duronto Rajshahi squad for the season of 2013.

Duronto Rajshahi squad
Batsmen: 29 Simon Katich (captain); 68 Chamara Kapugedera; 29 Nazmul Haque; 68 Dilshan Munaweera; 29 Moeen Ali; 10 Rizwan Cheema; All-rounders: 07 Ziaur Rahman; 16 Farhad Hossain; 15 Sean Ervine; 10 Mukhtar Ali	Wicket-keepers: 77 Charles Coventry; 15 Jahurul Islam; Bowlers: 68 Ben Edmondson; 10 Shakar Ahmed; 99 Abul Hasan; 13 Sachithra Senanayake; 02 Taijul Islam; 22 Monir Hossain; 13 Naeem Islam jnr; 11 Isuru Udana	Support staff: Head coach: Khaled Mashud; Assistant coach: Hannan Sarkar; Batting coach: Athar Ali Khan
