= List of East Zone cricketers (Bangladesh) =

This is presenting a complete list in alphabetical order of cricketers who have played for East Zone in first-class, List A or Twenty20 matches since the team was formed ahead of the 2012–13 season for the first Bangladesh Cricket League (BCL) competition. East Zone is a composite regional team which combines two divisional teams, Chittagong and Sylhet. Complying with other team lists, details are the player's name followed by his years active as an East Zone player, current players to the end of the 2015–16 season.

== A ==
- Abdul Halim (2015–16)
- Abu Jayed (2012–13 to 2015–16)
- Abul Hasan (2012–13 to 2015–16)
- Aftab Ahmed (2012–13)
- Alauddin Babu (2013–14)
- Ali Akbar (2013–14)
- Alok Kapali (2012–13 to 2015–16)
- Arafat Sunny (2014–15)
- Asif Ahmed (2014–15 to 2015–16)

== D ==
- Dhiman Ghosh (2012–13 to 2013–14)

== E ==
- Enamul Haque (2012–13 to 2013–14)

== F ==
- Faisal Hossain (2012–13)

== I ==
- Iftekhar Sajjad (2015–16)
- Imtiaz Hossain (2015–16)
- Irfan Shukkur (2014–15 to 2015–16)

== J ==
- Jubair Ahmed (2013–14)
- Jubair Hossain (2015–16)

== K ==
- Kamrul Islam Rabbi (2014–15 to 2015–16)
- Kazi Kamrul Islam (2012–13)

== L ==
- Liton Das (2013–14 to 2015–16)

== M ==
- Mashrafe Mortaza (2013–14)
- Mohammad Saifuddin (2015–16)
- Mominul Haque (2012–13 to 2015–16)
- Mosaddek Hossain (2013–14)

== N ==
- Nabil Samad (2012–13 to 2014–15)
- Nafees Iqbal (2012–13 to 2014–15)
- Nazimuddin (2013–14)
- Nazmul Hossain (2014–15)
- Nazmul Hossain Milon (2014–15)
- Nazmul Islam (2014–15 to 2015–16)

== R ==
- Rahatul Ferdous (2015–16)
- Rajin Saleh (2012–13 to 2014–15)

== S ==
- Sadiqur Rahman (2014–15)
- Shadman Islam (2013–14 to 2015–16)
- Shafiul Islam (2013–14 to 2015–16)
- Shahriar Nafees (2012–13)

== T ==
- Tamim Iqbal (2013–14 to 2014–15)
- Tapash Baisya (2012–13 to 2013–14)
- Tasamul Haque (2014–15 to 2015–16)

== Y ==
- Yasin Arafat (2012–13 to 2013–14)
- Yasir Ali (2015–16)

== Z ==
- Zakir Hasan (2015–16)
