= List of Abahani Limited cricketers =

Abahani Limited is a cricket team that plays List A and T20 cricket in the Dhaka Premier League and Dhaka Premier Division Twenty20 Cricket League. It has won three titles in 2015–16, 2017–18 and 2018–19.

This is presenting a complete list in alphabetical order of cricketers who have played for Abahani Limited in first-class, List A or Twenty20 matches since the team was formed ahead of the 1992-93 for the first edition of Navana Premier Division Cricket League competition. Complying with other club lists, details are the player's name followed by his years active as a Abahani Limited/Abahani Krira Chakra player, current players to the end of the 2015–16 season.

== A ==
- Abdul Mazid (2014–15)
- Abdul Razzaq (Pakistan; 2009–10)
- Abul Hasan (2010–11 to 2015–16)
- Aftab Ahmed (2013–14)
- Ahsanullah Hasan (2000–01 to 2005–06)
- Akram Khan (1993–94 to 2001–02)
- Alamgir Kabir (2001–02)
- Al-Amin (2013–14 to 2014–15)
- Al-Amin Hossain (2013–14 to 2014–15)
- Alauddin Babu (2010–11 to 2013–14)
- Ali Arman (2000–01 to 2005–06)
- Amit Kumar (2015–16)
- Anamul Haque (2010–11 to 2015–16)
- Anisur Rahman (2000–01)
- Anwaar Hafeez (2007–08)
- Anwar Hossain Monir (2001–02 to 2005–06)
- Arafat Sunny (2007–08 to 2015–16)
- Asadullah Khan (2000–01 to 2001–02)
- Ashfaq Ali (1994–95)
- Ashiqul Islam (2008–09)
- Ashraful Islam (1994–95)
- Aslam Ali (2013–14)
- Avishek Mitra (2015–16)
- Azam Iqbal (2000–01)

== B ==
- Babu (1993–94)
- Rajat Bhatia (India; 2010–11 to 2015–16)
- Biplab Sarkar (2008–09)
- Manvinder Bisla (India; 2015–16)

== D ==
- Rashmi Ranjan Das (India; 2011–12)
- Debabrata Paul (2005–06)
- Zander de Bruyn (South Africa; 2013–14)
- Indika de Saram (Sri Lanka; 2013–14)
- Shikhar Dhawan (India; 2010–11)

== E ==
- Elias Sunny (2011–12)
- Enamul Haque (2010–11)

== F ==
- Neil Fairbrother (England; 1993–94)
- Faisal Hossain (2005–06)
- Farhad Hossain (2010–11 to 2014–15)
- Farhad Reza (2011–12 to 2013–14)
- Faruque (1993–94)
- Fawad Alam (Pakistan; 2010–11)
- Fazle Mahmud (2011–12)

== G ==
- Gazi Alamgir (2005–06 to 2007–08)
- Gazi Ashraf (1993–94 to 1994–95)
- Janaka Gunaratne (Sri Lanka; 2013–14)

== H ==
- Hamidul Islam (2009–10 to 2013–14)
- Hannan Sarkar (2010–11)
- Harunur Rashid (1994–95)
- Hasanuzzaman (2005–06)

== I ==
- Iftekhar Nayeem (2013–14)
- Richard Illingworth (England; 1993–94)
- Imran Abbas (Pakistan; 2006–07)
- Imran Ahmed (2005–06 to 2008–09)
- Imrul Kayes (2009–10 to 2010–11)
- Iqbal Hossain (2000–01 to 2001–02)
- Iqbal Sikandar (Pakistan; 1994–95)
- Istiak Jamil (2006–07)

== J ==
- Jahidul Islam (2011–12 to 2013–14)
- Jahurul Islam (2005–06 to 2015–16)
- Jewel Hossain (1994–95)
- Jubair Hossain (2014–15 to 2016)
- Jupiter Ghosh (2009–10)

== K ==
- Kamal Merchant (Pakistan; 1994–95)
- Kamrul Islam Imon (2007–08 to 2008–09)
- Kamrul Islam Rabbi
- Thilina Kandamby (Sri Lanka; 2007–08 to 2013–14)
- Dinesh Karthik (India; 2015–16)
- Uday Kaul (India; 2015–16)
- Khaled Mashud (1994–95 to 2006–07)
- Ajay Kudua (India; 2009–10)
- Khuntal Chandra (2006–07)

== L ==
- Raman Lamba (1994–95)
- Liton (1993–94)
- Liton Das (2013–14 to 2015–16)

== M ==
- Mahbubul Alam (2010–11)
- Mahbubul Karim (2007–08 to 2009–10)
- Mahmudullah (2010–11 to 2015–16)
- Manash Kumar (2008–09)
- Mithun Manhas (India; 2010–11 to 2011–12)
- Manurul Islam Rana (2006–07)
- Manzoor Akhtar (Pakistan; 1994–95)
- Marshal Ayyub (2010–11 to 2011–12)
- Hamilton Masakdaza (Zimbabwe; 2014–15)
- Mashrafe Mortaza (2006–07 to 2015–16)
- Masudur Rahman (2000–01)
- Mehedi Maruf (2013–14)
- Mehrab Hossain (2001–02)
- Minhajul Abedin (1993–94 to 1994–95)
- Mohammad Mithun (2015–16)
- Mizanur Rahman (2013–14)
- Mohammad Hossain (2000–01 to 2001–02)
- Mohammad Rafique (2007–08 to 2010–11)
- Mohammad Saifuddin (2015–16)
- Mohammad Salim (2000–01)
- Mohammad Shahzada (2006–07 to 2015–16)
- OH Monir (1994–95)
- Moniruzzaman (2001–02)
- Morshed Ali Khan (2000–01)
- Mosaddek Hossain (2013–14 to 2015–16)
- Muktar Ali (2009–10)
- Mukhtar Siddique (2001–02)
- Mushfiqur Rahim (2013–14 to 2015–16)
- Mustafizur Rahman (2014–15 to 2015–16)
- Amol Mazumdar (2008–09)Naeem Islam Jr.

== N ==
- Nabil Samad (2013–14)
- Nadif Chowdhury (2007–08 to 2009–10)
- Naeem Islam Jr. (2013–14)
- Naeem Islam (2006–07)
- Nafees Iqbal (2000–01 to 2013–14)
- Naimur Rahman (1994–95 to 2001–02)
- Narendar Singh (India; 2011–12)
- Nasir Ahmed (1993–94)
- Nasir Hossain (2008–09 to 2015–16)
- Naved Anjum (Pakistan; 1994–95)
- Nazimuddin (2006–07 to 2013–14)
- Nazmul Hossain Shanto (2015–16)
- Mohammad Nazmul Hossain (2007–08 to 2008–09)
- Nazmul Hossain Milon (2013–14)
- Nazmul Islam (2011–12 to 2015–16)
- Nazmus Sadat (2006–07)
- Niamur Rashid (2000–01 to 2005–06)

== P ==
- Tharanga Pranavitana (Sri Lanka; 2013–14)
- Rashmi Parida (India; 2008–09 to 2010–11)
- Yusuf Pathan (India; 2015–16)
- Punit Singh (India; 2011–12)

== R ==
- Rafikul Khan (2007–08)
- Bhanuka Rajapaksha (Sri Lanka; 2014–15)
- Rajibul Islam (2001–02)
- Rakib Hasan (1994–95)
- Raqibul Hasan (2014–15)
- Rezaul Islam (2013–R14)
- Rejaul Karim (2007–08 to 2008–09)
- Rafiqul Hasan Ripon (1993–94)
- Robiul Islam (2009–10)
- Rony Talukdar (2008–09 to 2010–11)

== S ==
- Saghir Hossain (2007–08 to 2010–11)
- Saidul Islam (1993–94)
- Saif Hassan (2015–16)
- Saiful Islam (1993–94 to 1994–95)
- Sunzamul Islam (2015–16)
- Saqlain Sajib (2010–11to 2015–16)
- Sachithra Serasinghe (Sri Lanka; 2013–14)
- Shadab Kabir (Pakistan; 2005–06)
- Shadman Islam (2015–16)
- Shahadat Hossain (2015–16)
- Shahriar Nafees (2007–08 to 2013–14)
- Shakib Al Hasan (2009–10 to 2015–16)
- Shamimul Haque (2005–06)
- Shamsul Alam (2013–14)
- Shamsur Rahman (2013–14)
- Sheikh Sadi (1994–95)
- Shoaib Malik (Pakistan; 2000–01)
- Shuvagata Hom (2015–16)
- Chamara Silva (Sri Lanka; 2014–15)
- Gurupartap Singh (India; 1994–95)
- Robin Singh (India; 2000–01)
- Greg Smith (South Africa; 2013–14)
- Soumya Sarkar (2013–14 to 2015–16)
- Darren Stevens (England; 2011–12)
- Heath Streak (Zimbabwe; 2001–02)
- Subashis Roy (2007–08 to 2014–15)
- Subroto Sarkar (2011–12)
- Suhrawadi Shuvo (2006–07 to 2013–14)
- Sujon (1993–94)

== T ==
- Talha Jubair (2007–08 to 2008–09)
- Tamim Iqbal (2008–09 to 2015–16)
- Tapash Baisya (2010–11 to 2015–16)
- Taposh Ghosh (2013–14 to 2015–16)
- Tareq Javed (2000–01)
- Taskin Ahmed (2015–16)
- Manoj Tiwary (India; 2015–16)
- Tawhidul Islam (2015–16)
- Peter Trego (England; 2011–12)
- Tushar Imran (2006–07 to 2007–08)
- Twilna Sahan (2007–08)

== U ==
- Mahela Udawatte (Sri Lanka; 2011–12)

== V ==
- Venugopal Rao (India; 2008–09)

== W ==
- Wasim Akram (Pakistan; 1994–95)
- Riki Wessels (Australia; 2013–14)
- Luke Wright (England; 2013–14)

== Y ==
- Yashpal Singh (India; 2010–11 to 2015–16)
- Yasir Ali (2013–14)

== Z ==
- Zakir Hossain (1994–95)
- Ziaur Rahman (2006–07 to 2014–15)
