= List of Bangladesh under-23 international cricketers =

This is presenting a complete list in alphabetical order of the cricketers who have played for the Bangladesh national under-23 cricket team in first-class, List A and Twenty20 cricket.

== A ==
- Abdur Razzak
- Abu Jayed
- Arafat Sunny
- Ariful Haque
- Asif Ahmed

== D ==
- Dhiman Ghosh

== F ==
- Faisal Hossain

== G ==
- Gazi Alamgir

== I ==
- Imran Ahmed

== K ==
- Kamrul Islam

== L ==
- Liton Das

== M ==
- Mahmudul Hasan
- Mizanur Rahman
- Mohammad Mithun
- Myshukur Rahaman

== N ==
- Naeem Islam
- Nasiruddin Faruque
- Nazimuddin
- Nazmul Islam
- Noor Hossain
- Nurul Hasan

== R ==
- Rony Talukdar
- Rumman Ahmed

== S ==
- Sabbir Rahman
- Shahriar Nafees
- Soumya Sarkar
- Syed Rasel

== T ==
- Taijul Islam
