= List of Rangpur Division cricketers =

This is presenting a complete list in alphabetical order of cricketers who have played for Rangpur Division in first-class, List A or Twenty20 matches since the team was formed ahead of the 2011–12 season for the thirteenth National Cricket League (NCL) competition. Complying with other club lists, details are the player's name followed by his years active as a Rangpur player, current players to the end of the 2015–16 season.

== A ==
- Abdur Rahman (2011–12 to 2012–13)
- Afsharul Sujon (2011–12)
- Ahamedul Kabir (2013–14)
- Ahsanul Lipu (2011–12 to 2012–13)
- Alauddin Babu (2011–12 to 2013–14)
- Arafat Sunny (2015–16)
- Arif Reza (2011–12)
- Ariful Haque (2011–12 to 2015–16)
- Ashraful Alam (2013–14)
- Avishek Mitra (2012–13)

== B ==
- Bishawnath Halder (2014–15 to 2015–16)

== D ==
- Dhiman Ghosh (2011–12 to 2015–16)

== J ==
- Jahid Javed (2013–14)

== K ==
- Kalyan Ashish (2013–14 to 2015–16)

== L ==
- Liton Das (2011–12 to 2015–16)

== M ==
- Mahmudul Hasan (2011–12 to 2015–16)
- Minhas Reza (2011–12)
- S. M. Mustakim (2011–12)

== N ==
- Naeem Islam junior (2011–12)
- Naeem Islam senior (2011–12 to 2015–16)
- Nahidul Islam (2015–16)
- Nasir Hossain (2012–13 to 2015–16)
- Nobin Islam (2015–16)

== R ==
- Robiul Islam Robi (2011–12 to 2012–13)

== S ==
- Saddam Hossain (2015–16)
- Saddam Hossain Shawon (2013–14 to 2015–16)
- Sajidul Islam (2011–12 to 2015–16)
- Salauddin (2012–13 to 2013–14)
- Sanjit Saha (2014–15 to 2015–16)
- Saymon Ahmed (2011–12 to 2015–16)
- Subashis Roy (2011–12 to 2015–16)
- Suhrawadi Shuvo (2012–13 to 2015–16)

== T ==
- Tanveer Haider (2011–12 to 2015–16)
- Tariq Ahmed (2011–12 to 2015–16)
