= List of Central Zone cricketers (Bangladesh) =

This is presenting a complete list in alphabetical order of cricketers who have played for Central Zone in first-class, List A or Twenty20 matches since the team was formed ahead of the 2012–13 season for the first Bangladesh Cricket League (BCL) competition. Central Zone is a composite regional team which combines two divisional teams, Dhaka Division and Dhaka Metropolis. Complying with other team lists, details are the player's name followed by his years active as a Central Zone player, current players to the end of the 2015–16 season.

== A ==
- Abdul Mazid (2013/14 to 2014/15)
- Abu Hider (2014/15)
- Al-Amin Hossain (2015/16)
- Arafat Sunny (2013/14)
- Asif Ahmed (2012/13 to 2013/14)

== D ==
- Dewan Sabbir (2014/15 to 2015/16)
- Dhiman Ghosh (2014/15)

== E ==
- Elias Sunny (2012/13 to 2014/15)

== M ==
- Mahmudullah (2012/13 to 2014/15)
- Marshall Ayub (2012/13 to 2015/16)
- Mehrab Hossain (2012/13 to 2015/16)
- Mohammad Ashraful (2012/13)
- Mohammad Shahid (2013/14 to 2015/16)
- Mohammad Sharif (2012/13 to 2015/16)
- Mosharraf Hossain (2012/13 to 2015/16)

== N ==
- Nadif Chowdhury (2014/15)
- Nurul Hasan (2012/13 to 2013/14)

== R ==
- Raqibul Hasan (2012/13 to 2015/16)
- Rony Talukdar (2013/14 to 2015/16)

== S ==
- Saikat Ali (2015/16)
- Sajidul Islam (2015/16)
- Shahadat Hossain (2012/13 to 2013/14)
- Shohidul Islam (2014/15 to 2015/16)
- Shahriar Nafees (2013/14)
- Shamsur Rahman (2012/13 to 2015/16)
- Sharifullah (2014/15 to 2015/16)
- Shuvagata Hom (2012/13 to 2015/16)

== T ==
- Talha Jubair (2012/13)
- Tanveer Haider (2014/15 to 2015/16)
- Taskin Ahmed (2012/13 to 2014/15)

== Z ==
- Zabid Hossain (2014/15 to 2015/16)
