= 2015–16 Bangladesh Cricket League =

Cricket tournament

- Dates: 2015 – 2016
- Administrator(s): Bangladesh Cricket Board
- Cricket format: First-class
- Tournament format(s): Round-robin
- Champions: North Zone (1st title)
- Participants: 4
- Matches: 12
- Most runs: Tushar Imran (731)
- Most wickets: Sunzamul Islam (25); Shuvagata Hom (25)

The 2015–16 Bangladesh Cricket League was the fourth edition of the Bangladesh Cricket League, a first-class cricket competition. It was held in Bangladesh from 28 January to 8 March 2017. The tournament was played after the conclusion of the other first-class competition in Bangladesh, the 2016–17 National Cricket League. Central Zone were the defending champions. North Zone won the tournament, securing their first title in the competition.
