= Yeasin Arafat =

Yeasin Arafat may refer to:

- Yeasin Arafat (cricketer) (born 1998), Bangladeshi cricketer
- Yeasin Arafat (footballer) (born 2003), Bangladeshi footballer
