= Ashiquzzaman =

Ashiquzzaman is a masculine given name of Bengali origin. Notable people with the name include:

== Given name ==
- Ashiqur Zaman (born 2002), Bangladeshi cricketer
- Ashiquzzaman (cricketer) (born 1991), Bangladeshi cricketer
- Ashiquzzaman Tulu (born 1966), Bangladeshi singer, songwriter, and musician

== See also ==
- Aashiq (disambiguation)
- Zaman (disambiguation)
