= Minhaz Khan =

Bangladeshi cricketer (born 1991)

Personal information
- Full name: Minhaz Khan
- Born: 17 December 1991 (age 34); Dhaka, Bangladesh
- Source: ESPNcricinfo, 20 December 2016

Minhaz Khan (born 17 December 1991) is a Bangladeshi cricketer. He made his first-class debut for Dhaka Division in the 2016–17 National Cricket League on 20 December 2016. He made his List A debut for Shinepukur Cricket Club in the 2017–18 Dhaka Premier Division Cricket League on 15 February 2018. He made his Twenty20 debut for Uttara Sporting Club against Khelaghar Samaj Kallyan Samity in the 2018–19 Dhaka Premier Division Twenty20 Cricket League on 26 February 2019.
