= Ashiquzzaman (cricketer) =

Bangladeshi cricketer (born 1991)

Personal information
- Born: 15 August 1991 (age 35); Satkhira, Bangladesh
- Source: ESPNcricinfo, 20 December 2016

Ashiquzzaman (born 15 August 1991) is a Bangladeshi cricketer. He made his first-class debut for Khulna Division in the 2016–17 National Cricket League on 20 December 2016. On debut, he took 6 wickets for 57 runs in the second innings and nine wickets in the match, winning the man of the match award.

He made his List A debut for Legends of Rupganj in the 2017–18 Dhaka Premier Division Cricket League on 17 February 2018.
