= Nazmul Hossain =

Nazmul Hossain may refer to:

- Nazmul Hussain (born 1948), Indian cricketer
- Mohammad Nazmul Hossain (born 1987), Bangladeshi cricketer
- Nazmul Hossain Milon (born 1987), Bangladeshi cricketer
- Najmul Hossain Shanto (born 1998), Bangladeshi cricketer
