= Rony Chowdhury =

Bangladeshi cricketer (born 1995)

Personal information
- Born: 1 December 1995 (age 30); Chittagong, Bangladesh
- Source: ESPNcricinfo, 2 October 2016

Rony Chowdhury (born 1 December 1995) is a Bangladeshi cricketer. He made his first-class debut for Chittagong Division in the 2016–17 National Cricket League on 2 October 2016. In May 2021, Chowdhury was named in Khelaghar Samaj Kallyan Samity's squad for the 2021 Dhaka Premier Division Twenty20 Cricket League tournament. He made his Twenty20 debut on 7 June 2021, for Khelaghar Samaj Kallyan Samity, and took two wickets in the match. He made his List A debut on 16 March 2022, for Khelaghar Samaj Kallyan Samity in the 2021–22 Dhaka Premier Division Cricket League.
