= Mojibur Rahman (cricketer) =

Bangladeshi cricketer (born 1993)

Personal information
- Born: 1 November 1993 (age 33); Chittagong, Bangladesh
- Batting: Right-handed
- Bowling: Left-arm medium
- Role: All-rounder

Domestic team information
- Years: Team
- 2016/17–: Victoria Sporting Club

Career statistics
Competition	First-class
Matches	3
Runs scored	136
Batting average	34.00
100s/50s	1/0
Top score	102
Balls bowled	642
Wickets	16
Bowling average	16.18
5 wickets in innings	1
10 wickets in match	0
Best bowling	5/66
Catches/stumpings	1/–
- Source: ESPNcricinfo, 26 September 2016

Mojibur Rahman (born 1 November 1993) is a Bangladeshi cricketer. He made his List A debut for Victoria Sporting Club in the Dhaka Premier Division Cricket League on 8 May 2016. He made his first-class debut for Chittagong Division in the 2016–17 National Cricket League on 27 December 2016.
