= Saddam Hossain Shawon (cricketer, born 1994) =

Bangladeshi cricketer (born 1994)

Saddam Hossain
Personal information
- Born: 29 December 1994 (age 31); Lalmonirhat, Bangladesh
- Source: ESPNcricinfo, 25 September 2016

Saddam Hossain (born 29 December 1994) is a Bangladeshi first-class cricketer who plays for Rangpur Division.

== See also ==
- List of Rangpur Division cricketers
