= Shahanur Rahman =

Bangladeshi cricketer (born 1996)

Personal information
- Full name: Mohammad Shahanur Rahman
- Born: 25 April 1996 (age 30); Sylhet, Bangladesh
- Batting: Right-handed
- Bowling: Right-arm off-spin
- Role: All-rounder

Domestic team information
- Years: Team
- 2016-17 –: Sylhet Division

Career statistics
Competition	FC
Matches	3
Runs scored	136
Batting average	34.00
100s/50s	1/0
Top score	102
Balls bowled	642
Wickets	16
Bowling average	16.18
5 wickets in innings	1
10 wickets in match	0
Best bowling	5/66
Catches/stumpings	1/–
- Source: ESPNcricinfo, 12 October 2016

Shahanur Rahman (born 25 April 1996) is a Bangladeshi cricketer. He made his first-class debut for Sylhet Division in the 2016–17 National Cricket League on 25 September 2016. He is an off-spinner who bats in the lower middle order.

In his third match, against Chittagong Division, he scored 102 in Sylhet's first innings, then took 5 for 66 in Chittagong's first innings.

He made his List A debut for Partex Sporting Club against Prime Doleshwar Sporting Club in the 2016–17 Dhaka Premier Division Cricket League on 12 April 2017. He took two top-order wickets for 47 runs and affected a runout on debut.
