= Rifat Pradhan =

Bangladeshi cricketer (born 1997)

Personal information
- Born: 25 October 1997 (age 29); Narsingdi, Bangladesh
- Batting: Right-handed
- Bowling: Right-arm medium

Domestic team information
- Years: Team
- 2015–2016: Kalabagan

Career statistics
Competition	List A
Matches	4
Runs scored	18
Batting average	–
100s/50s	0/0
Top score	18*
Balls bowled	102
Wickets	2
Bowling average	33.50
5 wickets in innings	0
10 wickets in match	0
Best bowling	2/27
Catches/stumpings	0/–
- Source: ESPNcricinfo, 30 May 2016

Rifat Pradhan (born 9 August 1997) is a Bangladeshi first-class cricketer. He is a right-handed batsman and right-handed medium first bowler.
