= Zahiduzzaman =

Bangladeshi cricketer (born 1996)

Zahiduzzaman Sagor
Personal information
- Full name: Zahiduzzaman Khan Sagor
- Born: 3 July 1996 (age 30); Kawkhali, Pirojpur
- Batting: Left-handed
- Role: Wicket-keeper batsman

Domestic team information
- Years: Team
- 2023: Dhaka Dominators
- Source: ESPNcricinfo, 20 December 2016

Zahiduzzaman Sagor (born 3 July 1996) is a Bangladeshi cricketer, who plays as a wicket-keeper batsman. He made his first-class debut for Dhaka Division in the 2016–17 National Cricket League on 25 September 2016. He made his Twenty20 debut for Brothers Union in the 2018–19 Dhaka Premier Division Twenty20 Cricket League on 26 February 2019. He made his List A debut for Brothers Union in the 2018–19 Dhaka Premier Division Cricket League on 20 March 2019. Zahiduzzaman made his debut in Bangladesh Premier League for Dhaka Dominators on 7 February 2023.
