= Bangladesh national under-23 cricket team =

Bangladesh U23
Personnel
- Test captain: Naeem Islam
- One Day captain: Saif Hassan
- T20I captain: Najmul Hossain Shanto
- Owner: Bangladesh Cricket Board
- Manager: Habibul Bashar

History
- First-class debut: Zimbabwe A in 2004 at Osmani Stadium, Fatullah, Narayanganj

The Bangladesh national under-23 cricket team in March 2004 played a first-class match against Zimbabwe A at the Fatullah Osmani Stadium in Narayanganj, losing by 223 runs. The team has since played four matches in 2013, two of them having List A status.

== Honours ==
=== ACC ===
- ACC Emerging Asia Cup:
  - Runners-up (1): 2019

=== South Asian ===
- South Asian Games:
  - Gold Medal (1): 2019

== See also ==
- Bangladesh A cricket team
- Bangladesh High Performance XI
- Bangladesh national under-19 cricket team
- List of Bangladesh under-23 international cricketers
