= Tanumoy Ghosh =

Bangladeshi cricketer (born 1987)

Personal information
- Born: 10 December 1987 (age 38); Rajshahi, Bangladesh
- Source: ESPNcricinfo, 25 September 2016

Tanumoy Ghosh (born 10 December 1987) is a Bangladeshi first-class cricketer who plays for Rajshahi Division.

== See also ==
- List of Rajshahi Division cricketers
