= Najmus Sadat =

Bangladeshi cricketer (born 1984)

Personal information
- Born: 22 October 1984 (age 42); Dhaka, Bangladesh
- Source: ESPNcricinfo, 26 September 2016

Najmus Sadat (born 22 October 1984) is a Bangladeshi cricketer. He made his List A debut for Dhaka Division on 12 April 2005.
