= Abdur Rahman (Bangladeshi cricketer) =

Bangladeshi cricketer (born 1990)

Personal information
- Born: 21 February 1990 (age 36); Rangpur, Bangladesh
- Source: ESPNcricinfo, 25 September 2016

Abdur Rahman (born 21 February 1990) is a Bangladeshi first-class cricketer who plays for Rangpur Division.

== See also ==
- List of Rangpur Division cricketers
