= Indian Cricket League =

Defunct cricket league that operated from 2007 to 2009

- Sport: Cricket
- Founded: 2007
- Folded: 2009
- Divisions: 9
- No. of teams: 9 city teams, 4 international teams
- Country: India; Pakistan; Bangladesh
- Last champions: ICL India XI (ICL 20s World); Chennai Superstars (ICL 50s); Hyderabad Heroes (ICL 20s Grand); Lahore Badshahs (ICL 20-20)

The Indian Cricket League (ICL) was a short-lived cricket league that ran from 2007 to 2009. It was sponsored by Zee Entertainment Enterprises, a media company. The ICL had two seasons, featuring four international teams and nine domestic teams from India, Pakistan and Bangladesh. The matches were played in the Twenty20 format. A 50-over tournament was also held in early 2008.

The ICL faced significant opposition from the Board of Control for Cricket in India (BCCI) and the International Cricket Council (ICC). The BCCI did not approve of the ICL and launched its own rival league, the Indian Premier League (IPL), in 2008. The BCCI also banned the players who joined the ICL from playing for their national teams or in any other official tournaments. The IPL was more popular and successful than the ICL, leading to the ICL's collapse in 2009, ending its brief and controversial existence.

== Background ==
'Rebel' cricket leagues and fixtures played without backing from international boards and the International Cricket Council had been attempted before. Most notably, World Series Cricket, introduced in 1977 by broadcasting tycoon Kerry Packer, had proved the viability of cricket as a commercial product despite the league's short lifespan. In the 1980s, many international cricketers toured South Africa whilst the country was under a sporting boycott due to apartheid, often sponsored by private companies. Both these attempts resulted in pushback from international cricket authorities. World Series Cricket was the subject of litigation and were not permitted to use recognised cricket stadiums or language like "Test Match", so instead had to use stadiums intended for other sports and invent new terminology such as 'Supertest'. In the case of the latter, many cricketers received bans from their respective national teams for participating in these tours. As a result, the tours eventually came to an end, a few years before apartheid ended in South Africa and the sporting boycott was lifted.

In the early 2000s, the England and Wales Cricket Board (ECB) were looking for a way to market the game to a younger audience. Their solution was a new twenty-over competition to be played between counties. The resulting Twenty20 Cup, later renamed the T20 Blast, was a success and drew large crowds during its first season in 2003. Similar competitions sprung up in Pakistan, Australia and the West Indies. Eventually, the ICC conducted the first official Men's T20 World Cup in 2007.

The Board of Control for Cricket in India sent a young side to participate in the World Cup, due to their skepticism over the format's viability. Despite their inexperience, the Indian side won the tournament. Two months later, the inaugural season of the Indian Cricket League began without backing from the BCCI, who deemed the participants 'rebels' and excluded them from the Indian side.

== League structure ==
Each team was coached by a former international cricketer and composed of four international, two Indian and eight domestic players. The Board of Control for Cricket in India (BCCI) was assured that it was free to draw from ICL's talent pool. The league became active in November 2007 with matches in the Twenty20 format. Former international cricketers including Tony Greig, Dean Jones and Kiran More were hired as board members of the Indian Cricket League.

=== City teams ===
The city teams were club teams located in major cities in India, along with Lahore in Pakistan and Dhaka in Bangladesh. The 2007–08 season's 20-20 Indian Championship and 50s only featured Chandigarh, Chennai, Delhi, Hyderabad, Kolkata and Mumbai teams while Ahmedabad and Lahore teams joined in the 20s Grand Championship, and the Dhaka team joined in 2008–09 season.

- Chandigarh Lions
- Chennai Superstars
- Delhi Jets / Delhi Giants
- Hyderabad Heroes
- Kolkata Tigers / Royal Bengal Tigers
- Mumbai Champs
- Ahmedabad Rockets
- Lahore Badshahs
- Dhaka Warriors

=== ICL World teams ===
The ICL World teams participated in an additional competition, the ICL World Series. They did not play against the city teams. The 2007–08 season only featured World XI, India and Pakistan teams while Bangladeshi teams joined in 2008–09 season.

ICL World XI	ICL India XI	ICL Pakistan XI	ICL Bangladesh XI
Chris Harris; Damien Martyn; Chris Cairns (c); Ian Harvey; Jimmy Maher; Johan van der Wath; Lou Vincent (wk); Marvan Atapattu; Matthew Elliot; Michael Kasprowicz; Russel Arnold	Steve Rixon – Coach; Rajagopal Sathish (c); Abbas Ali; Abhishek Jhunjhunwala; Abu Nechim; Ali Murtaza; Ambati Rayudu; Ganapathi Vignesh; Ibrahim Khaleel (wk); Love Ablish; Ravi Raj Patil; Rohan Gavaskar; Stuart Binny; Syed Mohammed; Thirunavukkarasu Kumaran; TP Sudhindra; Sarbjit Singh; Sumit Kumar (wk); Tejinder Pal Singh; V. Sarvanan; A. Ansuman	Moin Khan – Coach; Inzamam-ul-Haq (c); Azhar Mahmood; Taufeeq Umar; Imran Farhat; Rana Naved-ul-Hasan; Abdul Razzaq; Naved Latif; Humayun Farhat; Shahid Nazir; Hasan Raza; Mohammad Sami; Imran Nazir; Riaz Afridi; Shabbir Ahmed	Balwinder Sandhu – Coach; Habibul Bashar (c); Aftab Ahmed; Alok Kapali; Dhiman Ghosh; Farhad Reza; Manjural Islam; Golam Mabud; Mahbubul Karim; Mohammad Rafique; Mohammad Sharif; Mosharraf Hossain; Gurt; Yuvraj Khanna; Jack Masterson; Kyle Magistrado; Youssef J Karam

== Tournaments ==
=== 2007–08 season results ===
Competition	Champion
ICL 20-20 Indian Championship	Chennai Superstars
ICL 50s	Chennai Superstars
ICL 20s Grand Championship	Hyderabad Heroes
ICL 20s World Series	ICL India XI

=== 2008–09 season results ===
Competition	Champion
ICL 20-20 Indian Championship	Lahore Badshahs
ICL 20s World Series	Cancelled

== Reception ==
The ICL received some support from unexpected quarters. Camps were held at Mayajaal in Chennai, a private resort with adequate cricket facilities. The then head of Indian Railways Lalu Prasad Yadav showed his backing by opening all the cricket stadiums controlled by the Indian Railways to the league. Describing the ICL as a "good initiative", Prasad issued a statement saying that the BCCI and ICL should each come up with a cricket team and play against each other to show who's the best. The state Government of West Bengal also agreed to rent its cricket grounds, notably Eden Gardens, to the league. In Ahmedabad, Ahmedabad Municipal Corporation provided its Sardar Vallabhbhai Patel Stadium for matches.

== Controversy ==
=== BCCI Response ===
The BCCI refused to recognise the ICL as a cricket league, and criticised Kiran More and Kapil Dev for joining the ICL. Kapil Dev's association with ICL was seen by the establishment as a conflict of interest as he was also the chairman of National Cricket Academy, a BCCI owned cricket facility. On 21 August 2007, Kapil Dev was sacked from his NCA post. Subhash Chandra had earlier stated that the ICL will go ahead regardless of the BCCI's stance. The International Cricket Council gave a statement through its chief executive, Malcolm Speed, that the ICC would not recognize the ICL unless the BCCI chooses to recognise it. On 25 July 2012, Kapil Dev informed BCCI that he had resigned from the ICL.

The BCCI decided to start its own Twenty20 league. The official league, which launched in April 2008, was called the Indian Premier League. The league's model was based on the franchise model of the National Football League and Major League Baseball in the US.

==== ICL takes BCCI to court ====
In August 2007, the ICL filed a petition against the BCCI in the Delhi High Court accusing the BCCI of threatening and intimidating them and other state organisations, and asked the court to stop BCCI from interfering with its attempts to sign up players for its tournaments. It also petitioned that the BCCI stop trying to "out-hire" cricket stadiums in India that are owned by the state governments, in anti-competitive attempts to stop the ICL from using them to play matches. On 27 August 2007, the Delhi High Court ruled in favour of the ICL. In its ruling, the Delhi High Court said that players should not suffer in the battle between corporate giants. The court issued notices to all corporate sponsors, the state cricket associations & the BCCI against terminating valid contracts of players joining the ICL. The Monopolies and Restrictive Trade Practices Commission (MRTPC) of India had asked its Director-General of Investigation to do an initial investigation into the BCCI's action against players who had joined the ICL. The investigation was based on media reports of the BCCI giving an open statement that it would ban players who join ICL. It was also reported in the media that all state associations, under direction from the BCCI, had cancelled their contracts with players.

=== Pressure on players from other national organisations ===
In considering rejoining the ICL former England wicketkeeper Paul Nixon was said to have put his career in jeopardy because any player that signed up with the ICL, which did not have official status from the International Cricket Council, risked losing their registration. The addition of a new team from Dhaka in Bangladesh, consisting largely of Bangladesh internationals caused more controversy as the cricket board of that country banned the players for 10 years for joining the 'rebel' ICL. Faced with the departure of so many players the board appealed to other Bangladeshi players to reject the new ICL team, stay loyal to the board and embrace the opportunity to play for their country.

== Downfall of the ICL ==
In April 2009, the BCCI offered an 'amnesty' to all Indian players associated with the ICL, a move that was quickly replicated by other boards like Bangladesh and South Africa. This led to a mass withdrawal of players from the ICL, and the league also faced a cash-crunch due to the impact of the Great Recession on the league's owners. The ICL still remained publicly confident of surviving the withdrawal and holding a new season of the tournament in October 2009, although that never happened.
