= Saeed Sarkar =

Bangladeshi cricketer (born 1997)

Personal information
- Born: 5 May 1997 (age 29); Comilla, Bangladesh
- Source: ESPNcricinfo, 16 May 2016

Saeed Sarkar (born 5 May 1997) is a Bangladeshi cricketer. He made his List A debut on 22 April 2016 for Cricket Coaching School in the Dhaka Premier Division Cricket League. Prior to his List A debut, he was named in Bangladesh's squad for the 2016 Under-19 Cricket World Cup. He made his first-class debut on 8 October 2016 for Chittagong Division in the 2016–17 National Cricket League.
