= Prosenjit Das =

Bangladeshi cricketer (born 1996)

Personal information
- Born: 17 December 1996 (age 29); Brahmanbaria, Bangladesh
- Batting: Right-handed
- Role: Wicket-keeper

Domestic team information
- Years: Team
- 2016-present: Dhaka Division
- 2016-present: Kala Bagan Cricket Academy
- Source: ESPNcricinfo, 7 June 2016

Prosenjit Das (born 17 December 1996) is a Bangladeshi first-class cricketer who played for Dhaka Division cricket team as well as Kala Bagan Cricket Academy. He is a right-handed wicket-keeper batsman.
