= Yeasin Arafat (cricketer) =

Bangladeshi cricketer

Yeasin Arafat Mishu
Personal information
- Born: 7 October 1998 (age 28); Noakhali, Bangladesh
- Height: 6 ft 1 in (185 cm)
- Batting: Right handed
- Bowling: Right arm medium
- Role: Fast bowler

International information
- National side: Bangladesh

Domestic team information
- Years: Team
- 2016-present: Chittagong
- 2017: Chittagong Vikings
- Source: ESPNcricinfo, 9 September 2019

Yeasin Arafat Mishu (born 7 October 1998) is a Bangladeshi cricketer. He made his first-class debut for Chittagong Division in the 2016–17 National Cricket League on 25 September 2016. He took a five-wicket haul in the first innings and was named man of the match. He made his List A debut for Brothers Union in the 2016–17 Dhaka Premier Division Cricket League on 20 April 2017.

== Domestic career ==
On 14 March 2018, bowling for Gazi Group Cricketers against Abahani Limited in the 2017–18 Dhaka Premier Division Cricket League, Arafat became the first Bangladeshi bowler to take eight wickets in a List A match. He finished with figures of 8 for 40 from 8.1 overs. It was the first eight-wicket haul in List A cricket since 2010.

In August 2019, he was one of 35 cricketers named in a training camp ahead of Bangladesh's 2019–20 season. He made his Twenty20 debut on 31 May 2021, for Mohammedan Sporting Club in the 2021 Dhaka Premier Division Twenty20 Cricket League.

== International career ==
In September 2019, he was named in Bangladesh's first two T20Is squad for the 2019–20 Bangladesh Tri-Nation Series. However, he could not play due to injury and he was replaced by Abu Haider. He was later dropped from the squad for the next two T20Is.
