= Saddam Hossain (cricketer) =

Bangladeshi cricketer (born 1995)

Personal information
- Full name: Mohammad Noor Alam Saddam Hossain
- Born: 3 October 1995 (age 31)
- Batting: Right-handed
- Bowling: Right-arm medium
- Role: Bowler

Domestic team information
- Years: Team
- 2015: Rangpur Division
- 2016: Khulna Titans

Career statistics
Competition	FC	LA	T20
Matches	20	31	9
Runs scored	114	203	10
Batting average	8.14	9.66	2.50
100s/50s	0/0	0/0	0/0
Top score	31	39	8
Balls bowled	1786	1244	118
Wickets	29	44	5
Bowling average	34.10	24.63	39.20
5 wickets in innings	1	0	0
10 wickets in match	0	0	0
Best bowling	5/57	4/39	2/3
Catches/stumpings	10/0	6/0	1/0
- Source: ESPNcricinfo, 23 December 2016

Saddam Hossain or Mohammad Noor Alam Saddam Hossain (born 3 October 1995) is a Bangladeshi cricketer. He made his first-class debut for Rangpur Division in the 2016–17 National Cricket League on 23 December 2016.
