= Kalabagan Cricket Academy =

Team information
- Founded: 2013
- Dissolved: 2016

Kalabagan Cricket Academy (also known as Kala Bagan Cricket Academy) was a Bangladeshi cricket team that played List A cricket in the Dhaka Premier League from 2013–14 to 2015–16.

== List A results ==
- 2013-14: 9 matches, won 5, finished sixth
- 2014-15: 16 matches, won 10, finished third
- 2015-16: 11 matches, won 2, finished last

Sharifullah captained the team in 2013–14, Mahmudul Hasan and Anamul Haque in 2014–15, and Mahmudul Hasan in 2015–16.

Before the 2016–17 season, the club was bought by the Gazi group of companies and renamed "Rupganj Tigers". They competed under this name in the Dhaka First Division Cricket League, one level below List A status, before achieving promotion to the Dhaka Premier League in 2021–22. While the Kalabagan Cricket Academy no longer fields a professional team, it continues to coach young players.

== Records ==
In their List A matches Kalabagan Cricket Academy's highest score was 150 not out by Anamul Haque in 2014–15, and the best bowling figures were 6 for 43 by Sabbir Rahman in 2014–15.
