= Saymon Ahmed =

Bangladeshi cricketer (born 1990)

Personal information
- Full name: Saymon Ahmed
- Born: 1 September 1990 (age 36); Lalmonirhat, Bangladesh
- Source: ESPNcricinfo, 23 December 2016

Saymon Ahmed (born 1 September 1990) is a Bangladeshi cricketer. He made his first-class debut for Rajshahi Division in the 2009–10 National Cricket League on 26 January 2010. He made his List A debut for Agrani Bank Cricket Club in the 2017–18 Dhaka Premier Division Cricket League on 15 February 2018.
