= Iftekhar Sajjad =

Bangladeshi cricketer (born 1991)

Personal information
- Born: 20 August 1991 (age 35); Chittagong, Bangladesh
- Source: ESPNcricinfo, 25 September 2016

Iftekhar Sajjad (born 20 August 1991) is a Bangladeshi cricketer who plays for the domestic first-class cricket side Chittagong Division. He made his Twenty20 debut on 31 May 2021, for Shinepukur Cricket Club in the 2021 Dhaka Premier Division Twenty20 Cricket League.

== See also ==
- List of Chittagong Division cricketers
