= Saleh Ahmed (cricketer, born 1997) =

Bangladeshi cricketer (born 1997)

Personal information
- Full name: Saleh Ahmed Shawon Gazi
- Born: 21 July 1997 (age 29); Bangladesh
- Batting: Left-handed
- Bowling: Slow left-arm orthodox

Domestic team information
- Years: Team
- 2014–present: Old DOHS Sports Club
- Source: ESPNCricinfo, 9 July 2015

Saleh Ahmed (born 21 July 1997) is a first-class cricketer from Bangladesh. In December 2015 he was named in Bangladesh's squad for the 2016 Under-19 Cricket World Cup.
