= Tawhidul Islam =

Bangladeshi cricketer (born 1992)

Personal information
- Born: 17 November 1992 (age 33); Jhalakathi, Bangladesh

Domestic team information
- Years: Team
- 2011 - 2019: Barisal Division
- Source: ESPNcricinfo, 25 September 2016

Tawhidul Islam (born 17 November 1992) is a Bangladeshi first-class cricketer who plays for Barisal Division.

== See also ==
- List of Barisal Division cricketers
