= Ruman Ahmed =

Bangladeshi cricketer (born 1991)

Personal information
- Born: 5 October 1991 (age 35); Dhaka, Bangladesh
- Batting: Right-handed

Career statistics
Competition	FC	LA	T20
Matches	39	27	2
Runs scored	1,614	344	19
Batting average	26.03	14.95	9.5
100s/50s	1/10	0/1	0/0
Top score	106	53	16
Catches/stumpings	33/1	5/–	2/–
- Source: ESPNcricinfo, 9 February 2022

Ruman Ahmed (born 5 October 1991) is a Bangladeshi cricketer who plays for Sylhet Division since the 2009–10 season.
