= Ezaz Ahmed =

Bangladeshi cricketer (born 1984)

Personal information
- Full name: Ezaz Hashmi
- Born: 10 April 1984 (age 42); Sylhet, Bangladesh
- Batting: Right-handed
- Bowling: Right-arm fast-medium

Domestic team information
- Years: Team
- 2002/03–2010/11: Sylhet Division

Career statistics
Competition	FC	List A
Matches	37	45
Runs scored	1,166	734
Batting average	18.50	18.82
100s/50s	1/5	–/3
Top score	120	67
Balls bowled	425	145
Wickets	9	5
Bowling average	32.55	25.20
5 wickets in innings	–	–
10 wickets in match	–	–
Best bowling	3/41	4/48
Catches/stumpings	21/–	9/–
- Source: CricketArchive, 18 January 2011

Ezaz Hashmi (born 4 October 1984, in Sylhet) is a first-class and List A cricketer from Bangladesh. He made his debut for Sylhet Division in 2002/03, playing in 35 first-class and 43 one day matches.
