= Arman Hossain =

Bangladeshi cricketer (born 1983)

Personal information
- Born: 22 June 1983 (age 43); Kalindi, Dhaka, Bangladesh
- Source: ESPNcricinfo, 12 December 2016

Arman Hossain (born 22 June 1983) is a Bangladeshi cricketer. He played sixteen first-class and fourteen List A matches between 2007 and 2014. He was also part of Bangladesh's squad for the 2000 Under-19 Cricket World Cup.
