= Joyraz Sheik =

Bangladeshi cricketer (born 1996)

Personal information
- Full name: Joyraz Sheik Emon
- Born: 21 September 1996 (age 30); Dhaka, Bangladesh
- Batting: Right-handed
- Bowling: Right-arm offbreak

International information
- National side: Bangladesh

Domestic team information
- Years: Team
- 2015–present: Dhaka Division

Career statistics
Competition	FC	LA	T20
Matches	13	20	7
Runs scored	473	319	69
Batting average	23.65	15.95	17.25
100s/50s	0/2	0/1	0/0
Top score	65	61	24
Balls bowled	78	63	0
Wickets	1	3	–
Bowling average	69.00	21.66	–
5 wickets in innings	0	0	–
10 wickets in match	0	–	–
Best bowling	1/20	2/14	–
Catches/stumpings	14/–	11/–	3/–
- Source: Cricinfo, 8 November 2022

Joyraz Sheik (born 21 September 1996) is a Bangladeshi cricketer.

He has played first-class cricket irregularly for Dhaka Division since 2015. In December 2015 he was named in Bangladesh's squad for the 2016 Under-19 Cricket World Cup. He made his Twenty20 debut on 11 June 2021, for Partex Sporting Club in the 2021 Dhaka Premier Division Twenty20 Cricket League.
