= Hamidul Islam =

Bangladeshi cricketer (born 1989)

Personal information
- Full name: Mohammad Hamidul Islam
- Born: 15 August 2002 (age 24); Rajshahi, Bangladesh
- Batting: Right handed
- Role: wicket-keeper
- Source: ESPNcricinfo, 24 February 2020

Hamidul Islam (born 12 January 1989) is a Bangladeshi cricketer. A right-handed batsman and wicket-keeper, he made his first-class debut for Rajshahi Division in the 2008–09 National Cricket League on 26 October 2008.
