= Alok Kapali =

Bangladeshi cricketer

Personal information
- Born: 1 January 1984 (age 42); Sylhet, Bangladesh
- Batting: Right-handed
- Bowling: Leg break

International information
- National side: Bangladesh (2002–2011)
- Test debut (cap 26): 28 July 2002 v Sri Lanka
- Last Test: 28 February 2006 v Sri Lanka
- ODI debut (cap 57): 4 August 2002 v Sri Lanka
- Last ODI: 6 December 2011 v Pakistan
- ODI shirt no.: 14
- T20I debut (cap 12): 1 September 2007 v Kenya
- Last T20I: 29 November 2011 v Pakistan

Domestic team information
- Years: Team
- 2000–2021: Sylhet Division
- 2012: Sylhet Royals
- 2013: Barisal Burners
- 2015: Comilla Victorians
- 2016: Khulna Titans
- 2017–2019: Sylhet Sixers
- 2019–2020: Rajshahi Royals

Career statistics
Competition	Test	ODI	FC	LA
Matches	17	69	172	262
Runs scored	584	1,235	9,138	5,367
Batting average	17.69	19.60	33.84	25.67
100s/50s	0/2	1/5	20/37	4/23
Top score	85	115	228	115
Balls bowled	1,103	1,452	14,194	7,164
Wickets	6	24	217	178
Bowling average	118.16	52.29	32.56	32.33
5 wickets in innings	0	0	7	0
10 wickets in match	0	0	1	0
Best bowling	3/3	3/49	7/33	5/44
Catches/stumpings	5/–	29/–	144/–	108/–
- Source: ESPNcricinfo, 13 November 2025

Alok Kapali (Bengali: অলোক কাপালী; born 1 January 1984) is a Bangladeshi cricketer. He is an allrounder who bats in the middle to lower order and bowls leg spin. He was the first Bangladeshi cricketer to take a Test hat-trick.

== Early life and background ==
Kapali was born into a Bengali Hindu family in Sylhet, Bangladesh. He is the youngest of six brothers and four sisters in his family. His father worked at a Hindu temple in his hometown, Sylhet.

== International career ==
=== Test career ===
Kapali made his Test debut in 2002, against Sri Lanka at Colombo. He took 2 wickets, Michael Vandort and Upul Chandana as well as scoring 39 runs and 23 runs with batting. In his next 16 Tests he took just 4 more wickets and this included a hat-trick against Pakistan in 2003. This was spread over two overs and when he trapped Umar Gul in a LBW with the first ball of his 3rd over, Kapali became the first Bangladeshi bowler to achieve the milestone in Test cricket, and the youngest of all time, at the age of 19 years and 240 days. He finished with figures of three runs for three wickets (3/3). His effort in quickly cleaning up the tail order also allowed Bangladesh their maiden first innings lead in Tests. He is currently the player with the lowest amount of wickets in total, with 6, for those who have bowled a Test hat-trick.

With the bat, Kapali has struggled thus far in Test cricket and made his highest score of 85 runs against the West Indies at Chittagong.

Kapali has the unfortunate distinction of playing for the losing side in all 17 of his Test matches for Bangladesh.

=== One Day Internationals ===
In One Day International cricket he has been in and out of the side, impressing more with the bat than the ball. He hit the fastest century by a Bangladeshi batsmen (86 deliveries) in a match against India during the 2008 Asia cup., a record broken by Shakib Al Hasan two years later. He also holds the Bangladeshi record of 7th wicket partnership of 89 runs with Khaled Mashud, made against Kenya in 2006.One Day International Cricket - Partnership Records (Countries & Grounds)

== Domestic career ==
Kapali scored 3 hundreds for Sylhet in the Bangladeshi National Cricket League of 2006–07, finishing with 744 runs.

He was the leading run-scorer in the 2016–17 National Cricket League tournament, with 598 runs, including a career-best of 200 not out in the final match of the competition.

In January 2018, he scored his 20th century in first-class cricket, batting for the East Zone against Central Zone, in the 2017–18 Bangladesh Cricket League.

== ICL career ==
In 2008, Kapali was banned for 10 years for playing international cricket because he joined the unsanctioned Indian Cricket League and played for the Dhaka Warriors in the Indian Cricket League. He scored the first century in the two seasons of ICL, 100 runs in 60 balls, against Hyderabad Heroes. He finished as the second highest scorer of the league stage with 324 runs in 8 matches at an average of 54 runs. However Kapali announced he quit the ICL in June 2009 and was available for national selection by 31 December 2009.

== BPL career ==
The Bangladesh Cricket Board founded the six-team Bangladesh Premier League in 2012, a twenty20 tournament to be held in February that year. The BCB made Alok Kapali the 'icon player' for Sylhet Royals. He scored 124 runs from 9 matches.

Later he also played for several BPL teams, while his innings during final match of 2015–16 Bangladesh Premier League on behalf of Comilla Victorians was extraordinary.

In October 2018, he was named in the squad for the Sylhet Sixers team, following the draft for the 2018–19 Bangladesh Premier League. In November 2019, he was selected to play for the Rajshahi Royals in the 2019–20 Bangladesh Premier League.
