= Mahbubul Karim =

Bangladeshi cricketer (born 1986)

Personal information
- Born: 7 May 1986 (age 40); Chittagong, Bangladesh
- Nickname: Mithu
- Batting: Right-handed

Domestic team information
- Years: Team
- 2003/04–2016/17: Chittagong Division
- 2008: Dhaka Warriors
- 2013/14: Kala Bagan Krira Chakra
- 2014/15: Victoria Sporting Club
- 2016–2017: Sheikh Jamal Dhanmondi Club

Career statistics
Competition	FC	LA	T20
Matches	43	51	1
Runs scored	1,747	1,357	45
Batting average	22.39	26.60	45.00
100s/50s	2/8	2/5	0/0
Top score	162	145	45
Balls bowled	201	71	–
Wickets	0	2	–
Bowling average	–	28.00	–
5 wickets in innings	–	0	–
10 wickets in match	–	0	–
Best bowling	–	2/17	–
Catches/stumpings	10/–	8/–	1/–
- Source: ESPNcricinfo, 29 June 2019

Mahbubul Karim (born 10 May 1986) is a former Bangladeshi cricketer. He is also known as Mahbub-ul-Karim and sometime referred to on scoresheets by the name Mithu. He was born in Chittagong in 1986.

A specialist batsman, he made his debut for Chittagong Division in 2003/04 and played through the 2017/18 season, playing in a total of 43 first-class and 51 list A matches. He played in eight Indian Cricket League matches for Dhaka Warriors in 2008.
