= Rahatul Ferdous =

Bangladeshi cricketer (born 1995)

Personal information
- Full name: Rahatul Ferdous Javed
- Born: 5 October 1995 (age 31); Sylhet, Bangladesh
- Batting: Left-handed
- Bowling: Slow left-arm orthodox
- Role: All Rounder

Domestic team information
- Years: Team
- 2015-present: Sylhet Division
- 2014–2019: Mohammedan SC
- 2019–2023: Brothers Union
- 2024- Present: Chittagong Kings
- 2022: Hetton Lyons CC, UK
- 2024: Fairburn CC, UK
- Source: ESPNcricinfo, 2 June 2022

Rahatul Ferdous (born 5 October 1995) is a Bangladeshi cricketer. A left-handed all rounder, he made his Twenty20 debut on 31 May 2021, for Brothers Union in the 2021 Dhaka Premier Division Twenty20 Cricket League.
