= Kazi Kamrul Islam =

Bangladeshi cricketer (born 1987)

Kazi Kamrul Islam (born 12 October 1987) is a Bangladeshi first-class cricketer who has played for Chittagong Division since the 2005–06 Bangladeshi cricket season.
