= Dewan Sabbir =

Bangladeshi cricketer (born 1992)

Personal information
- Born: 3 October 1992 (age 34)
- Batting: Right handed
- Bowling: Right arm Fast medium
- Role: Bowler

Domestic team information
- Years: Team
- 2012- present: Dhaka Division
- 2013: Dhaka Gladiators
- Source: ESPNcricinfo, 25 September 2016

Dewan Sabbir (born 3 October 1992) is a Bangladeshi first-class cricketer who plays for Dhaka Division as a fast medium bowler.

== See also ==
- List of Dhaka Division cricketers
