= Tasamul Haque =

Bangladeshi cricketer (born 1991)

Personal information
- Full name: Mohamed Tasamul Haque
- Born: 2 October 1991 (age 35); Dhaka, Bangladesh
- Nickname: Rubel
- Batting: Right-handed
- Bowling: Right-arm off-spin

Domestic team information
- Years: Team
- 2010/11: Sylhet Division
- 2011/12–2013/14: Dhaka Metropolis
- 2013/14–: Kala Bagan Krira Chakra
- 2014/15–: Chittagong Division

Career statistics
Competition	FC	List A	T20
Matches	48	40	3
Runs scored	3059	964	45
Batting average	42.48	34.42	15.00
100s/50s	11/15	1/2	0/0
Top score	135*	126*	26
Balls bowled	924	102	0
Wickets	14	3	–
Bowling average	44.28	29.00	–
5 wickets in innings	0	0	–
10 wickets in match	0	0	–
Best bowling	3/109	2/23	–
Catches/stumpings	40/–	16/–	1/–
- Source: ESPNcricinfo, 18 November 2016

Mohamed Tasamul Haque (born 2 October 1991) is a Bangladeshi cricketer who has played first-class cricket since 2011, mainly as a batsman.
