= Mehrab Hossain (cricketer, born 1987) =

Bangladeshi cricketer (born 1987)

Personal information
- Full name: Mehrab Hossain
- Born: 8 July 1987 (age 39); Rajshahi, Bangladesh
- Batting: Left-handed
- Bowling: Slow left-arm orthodox
- Role: Batsman

International information
- National side: Bangladesh
- Test debut (cap 47): 3 July 2007 v Sri Lanka
- Last Test: 3 January 2009 v Sri Lanka
- ODI debut (cap 83): 13 October 2006 v Zimbabwe
- Last ODI: 18 August 2009 v Zimbabwe
- T20I debut (cap 20): 5 November 2008 v South Africa
- Last T20I: 2 August 2009 v West Indies

Domestic team information
- Years: Team
- 2004–2011: Dhaka Division
- 2011–present: Dhaka Metropolis
- 2011: Dhaka Gladiators (squad no. Chittagong Kings)
- 2012

Career statistics
Competition	Test	ODI	FC	LA
Matches	7	18	40	52
Runs scored	243	276	2,084	1,070
Batting average	20.25	17.25	32.06	23.26
100s/50s	0/1	0/1	4/9	0/6
Top score	83	54	196	65*
Balls bowled	407	253	3,042	1,495
Wickets	4	4	41	36
Bowling average	70.25	53.50	42.75	31.19
5 wickets in innings	0	0	2	0
10 wickets in match	0	0	1	0
Best bowling	2/29	2/30	6/80	4/37
Catches/stumpings	2/–	7/–	20/–	20/–
- Source: CricketArchive, 31 October 2009

Mehrab Hossain (Bengali: মেহরাব হোসেন; born 8 July 1987) is a former Bangladeshi cricketer who came through successfully through the age groups of the country. He was a member of the U-19 Bangladesh National Cricket Team of the 2006 U-19 Cricket World Cup. He was called in the national team for the first time at the 2006 ICC Champions Trophy and played his first ODI match against Zimbabwe. He is a left-handed middle order batsman and slow left arm bowler. He represented Bangladesh in 12 U19 ODI matches, taking 16 wickets and scoring 213 runs. In May 2007, he was picked for the Bangladesh Test squad for the first time, for India's tour of the country.

After dropping off from the national team, Hossain played in the domestic league for Dhaka Metropolis, Dhaka Gladiators and Chittagong Kings.

Hossain migrated to Canada after retiring from playing professional cricket. In September 2023, he joined the Royal Canadian Mounted Police at the Niagara Regional Police Service as a police officer.
