= Al-Amin (cricketer) =

Bangladeshi cricketer (born 1993)

Personal information
- Full name: Mohammad Al-Amin
- Born: 5 October 1993 (age 33)
- Batting: Right-handed
- Bowling: Right arm Offbreak

Domestic team information
- Years: Team
- 2012-2024: Dhaka Metropolis
- 2025-present: Mymensingh Division
- 2015: Rangpur Riders
- 2016: Comilla Victorians
- 2017: Chittagong Vikings
- 2019: Khulna Titans
- 2019–20: Rangpur Rangers
- 2023: Chattogram Challengers

Career statistics
Competition	FC	LA	T20
Matches	72	144	56
Runs scored	3,246	3,680	605
Batting average	34.90	31.45	15.92
100s/50s	4/21	5/20	0/1
Top score	199	111	51
Balls bowled	2,297	3,060	205
Wickets	28	78	9
Bowling average	46.28	31.71	31.44
5 wickets in innings	1	3	0
10 wickets in match	0	0	0
Best bowling	5/49	6/22	2/22
Catches/stumpings	43/-	55/-	12/-
- Source: ESPNcricinfo, 4 December 2025

Mohammad Al-Amin (born 5 October 1993), known simply as Al-Amin, is a Bangladeshi first-class cricketer who plays for Barisal Division. He was a member of Bangladesh's under-19 cricket team for the 2012 Under-19 Cricket World Cup.

He was the leading run-scorer for Prime Bank Cricket Club in the 2017–18 Dhaka Premier Division Cricket League, with 495 runs in 11 matches. In October 2018, he was named in the squad for the Khulna Titans, following the draft for the 2018–19 Bangladesh Premier League. He was the leading run-scorer for Barisal Division in the 2018–19 National Cricket League, with 260 runs in five matches.
