= Noor Hossain (cricketer) =

Bangladeshi cricketer (born 1992)

Mohammad Noor Hossain
Personal information
- Born: 3 December 1992 (age 33); Dhaka, Bangladesh
- Nickname: Munna
- Batting: Right-handed
- Bowling: Legbreak

Domestic team information
- Years: Team
- 2011/12–2016/17: Chittagong Division
- 2009/10–2013/14: Dhaka Division
- First-class debut: 22 February 2010 Dhaka Division v Chittagong Division
- Last First-class: 25 September 2016 Chittagong Division v Rangpur Division
- List A debut: 5 May 2010 Bangladesh A v South Africa A
- Last List A: 6 June 2016 Kala Bagan Cricket Academy v Kala Bagan Krira Chakra

Career statistics
Competition	FC	LA	T20
Matches	26	40	10
Runs scored	579	261	27
Batting average	19.30	19.30	13.50
100s/50s	–/1	–/–	–/–
Top score	68	38	13*
Balls bowled	4191	1433	174
Wickets	80	41	6
Bowling average	34.32	29.85	38.33
5 wickets in innings	4	–	–
10 wickets in match	–	–	–
Best bowling	6/146	3/22	2/21
Catches/stumpings	18/–	15/–	3/–
- Source: Cricket Archive, 6 December 2016

Mohammad Noor Hossain (born December 3, 1992) is a Bangladeshi cricketer. A leg spinner and a useful lower-order batsman, Hossain's most memorable performance to date is his 65 at number eight against Zimbabwe Under-19s in a one-dayer in November 2009 to help Bangladesh Under-19s win by one wicket.
