= Mohammad Sharif (cricketer) =

Bangladeshi cricketer (born 1985)

Personal information
- Full name: Mohammad Sharif
- Born: 12 December 1985 (age 40); Narayanganj, Dhaka, Bangladesh
- Height: 1.67 m (5 ft 6 in)
- Batting: Right-handed
- Bowling: Right-arm medium-fast

International information
- National side: Bangladesh (2001-2007)
- Test debut (cap 14): 19 April 2001 v Zimbabwe
- Last Test: 3 July 2007 v Sri Lanka
- ODI debut (cap 51): 7 April 2001 v Zimbabwe
- Last ODI: 9 February 2007 v Zimbabwe

Domestic team information
- Years: Team
- 2000-2018: Dhaka Division
- Rangpur Riders
- Dhaka Warriors

Career statistics
Competition	Tests	ODIs	FC	LA
Matches	10	9	132	119
Runs scored	122	53	3222	1029
Batting average	7.17	13.25	19.06	15.35
100s/50s	0/0	0/0	1/10	0/2
Top score	24*	13*	147*	58*
Balls bowled	1651	499	19,427	5,352
Wickets	14	10	393	185
Bowling average	79.00	42.40	28.03	23.63
5 wickets in innings	0	0	15	7
10 wickets in match	–	–	3	0
Best bowling	4/98	3/40	6/24	6/33
Catches/stumpings	5/-	1/-	73/–	39/–
- Source: ESPNcricinfo, 12 April 2020

Mohammad Sharif (Bengali: মোহাম্মদ শরীফ) (born 12 December 1985) is a Bangladeshi former right-arm medium-fast bowler who played 10 Tests and 9 One Day Internationals (ODIs) for the Bangladesh cricket team from 2001 to 2007. He has taken 393 wickets in first-class cricket, the most by a Bangladeshi who is not a left-arm orthodox spin bowler.

== Career ==
He has played 10 Tests and 9 ODIs in his entire playing career. Five and a half years after taking part in the one-day international series in Zimbabwe, India are on tour. He holds the record for most first-class matches among Bangladesh fast bowlers. He has taken 393 wickets in 132 matches. There are more records next to Sharif's name. No other fast bowler in the country has the reputation of taking 5 wickets 15 times in the first class. He also did a hat trick. He has scored 3,222 runs in 199 innings with the bat. There are 10 half-centuries with 1 century.

== International career ==
He made his Test and ODI debut against Zimbabwe in April 2001. He played in ten Tests and nine ODIs for the Bangladeshi cricket team. He was called in the national side after five years for the Bangladesh tour of Zimbabwe for ODIs, and was recalled for Tests after five and a half years for the Indian tour of Bangladesh. He last played for Bangladesh in 2007.

International One Day Cricket Match lists:

- 1st Match Bangladesh vs. Zimbabwe on 05/04/2001 in Harare. (Zimbabwe)
- 2nd Match Bangladesh vs. Zimbabwe on 08/04/2001 in Harare. (Zimbabwe)
- 3rd Match Bangladesh vs. Zimbabwe on 11/04/2001 in Bulawayo. (Zimbabwe)
- 4th Match Bangladesh vs. Zimbabwe on 23/11/2001 in Chattogram. (Bangladesh )
- 5th Match Bangladesh vs. Zimbabwe on 26/11/2001 in Bangobandhu National Cricket stadium Dhaka. ( Bangladesh )
- 6th Match Bangladesh vs. Pakistan on 22/1/2002 in Chattogram. (Bangladesh )
- 7th Match Bangladesh vs. Pakistan on 24/1/2002 in Bangobandhu National Cricket stadium Dhaka. ( Bangladesh )
- 8th Match Bangladesh vs. Pakistan on 25/1/2002 in Bangobandhu National Cricket stadium Dhaka. ( Bangladesh )
- 9th Match Bangladesh vs. Zimbabwe on 9/2/2007 in Harare. (Zimbabwe)

International Test Cricket Match lists:

- 1st Match Bangladesh vs. Zimbabwe from 19 April to 22 April 2001 in Zulawayo. ( Zimbabwe )
- 2nd Match Bangladesh vs. Zimbabwe from 26 April to 30 April 2001 in Harare. ( Zimbabwe )
- 3rd Match Bangladesh vs. Pakistan from 29 August to 31 August 2001 in Multan. ( Pakistan )
- 4th Match Bangladesh vs. Sri Lanka from 6 September to 8 September 2001 in Colombo. (Sri Lanka )
- 5th Match Bangladesh vs. Zimbabwe from 15 November to 19 November 2001 in Chattogram. ( Bangladesh )
- 6th Match Bangladesh vs. New Zealand from 18 December to 22 December 2001 in Hamilton. (New Zealand )
- 8th Match Bangladesh vs. Pakistan from 9 January to 13 January 2002 in Dhaka. (Bangladesh)
- 9th Match Bangladesh vs. Pakistan from 16 January to 20 January 2002 in Chattogram. (Bangladesh)
- 10th Match Bangladesh vs. India from 25 May to 27 May 2007 in Dhaka. (Bangladesh)
- 11th Match Bangladesh vs. India from 3 July to 5 July 2007 in Colombo(Pss) (Sri Lanka)

== Domestic career ==
He played 132 First-class cricket, 119 List A cricket and 22 T20 matches. In February 2018, he took a hat-trick, bowling for Legends of Rupganj against Gazi Group Cricketers in the 2017–18 Dhaka Premier Division Cricket League. It was his second hat-trick in List A cricket. He was the leading wicket-taker for Brothers Union in the 2018–19 Dhaka Premier Division Cricket League tournament, with 14 dismissals in 9 matches.

=== Dhaka Premiere League (DPL) ===
- Bangladesh Biman – (2000- 2005)
- Surjotorun –(2005–2006)
- Sonargaon Cricketers –(2006–2007)
- Victoria Sporting – (2007–2008)
- Kalabagan Cricketers – (2008–2009)
- Kalabagan Krira Chakra – ( 2009–2011)
- Prime Bank- (2011–2012)
- Kalabagan Krira Chakra -(2012–2014)
- Gazi Group Cricketers –(2014–2015)
- Legends of Rupganj –( 2015–2017)
- Brothers Union-( 2017–2019)

=== Bangladesh Premiere League ( BPL ) ===
- Played 22 T20 matches in BPL ( Bangladesh Premier League )
- Played for Rangpur Riders in 2012.
- Played for Comilla Victorians in 2016.
- Played for Sylhet Sixers in 2017.

== Test cricket career ==
International Match	Organizing body	Team Represented	Format	Year	Country	Match Result	Awards/ Recognitions
Bangladesh vs. Zimbabwe	ICC	Bangladesh Cricket Team	Test Cricket (5days)	19 to 22 April 2001	Zimbabwe	Zimbabwe won by an innings and 32 runs	Mohammad Sharif 1/112 (29 overs)
Bangladesh vs. Zimbabwe	ICC	Bangladesh Cricket Team	Test	26th to 30 April 2001	Zimbabwe	Zimbabwe won by 8 wickets	Mohammad Sharif 2/142 (34.4 overs)
Bangladesh vs. Pakistan	ICC	Bangladesh Cricket Team	Test	27 to 31 Aug, 2001	Pakistan	Pakistan won by an innings and 264 runs	Mohammad Sharif 2/110 (24.5 overs)
Bangladesh vs. Sri Lanka	ICC	Bangladesh Cricket Team	Test	06 to 08 Sep, 2001	Sri Lanka	Sri Lanka won by an innings and 137 runs	Mohammad Sharif 0/110 (17 overs)
Bangladesh vs. Zimbabwe	ICC	Bangladesh Cricket Team	Test	15 to 19 Nov 2001	Bangladesh	Zimbabwe won by 8 wickets	Mohammad Sharif 0/118 (29 overs)
Bangladesh vs. New Zealand	ICC	Bangladesh Cricket Team	Test	18 to 22 Dec 2001	New Zealand	New Zealand won by an innings and 52 runs	Mohammad Sharif 3/114 (20.1 overs)
Bangladesh vs. Pakistan	ICC	Bangladesh Cricket Team	Test	9 to 13 Jan 2002	Bangladesh	Pakistan won by an innings and 178 runs	Mohammad Sharif 2/95 (35 overs)
Bangladesh vs. Pakistan	ICC	Bangladesh Cricket Team	Test	16 to 20 Jan 2002	Bangladesh	Pakistan won by an innings and 169 runs	Mohammad Sharif 4/98 (35.5 overs)
Bangladesh vs. India	ICC	Bangladesh Cricket Team	Test	25 to 27 May 2007	Bangladesh	India won by an innings and 239 runs	Mohammad Sharif 0/109 (25.4overs)
Bangladesh vs. Sri Lanka	ICC	Bangladesh Cricket Team	Test	3 to 5 July 2007	Sri Lanka	Sri Lanka won by an innings and 90 runs	Mohammad Sharif 0/86(24overs)

== One Day cricket career ==
International Match	Organizing body	Team Represented	Format	Year	Country	Match Result	Awards/ Recognitions
Bangladesh vs. Zimbabwe	ICC	Bangladesh Cricket Team	One Day Cricket (ODI)	05/04/01	Zimbabwe	Zimbabwe won by 7 wickets	Mohammad Sharif 1/31 (10 overs)
Bangladesh vs. Zimbabwe	ICC	Bangladesh Cricket Team	ODI	08/04/01	Zimbabwe	Zimbabwe won by 127 runs	Mohammad Sharif 3/48 (10 overs)
Bangladesh vs. Zimbabwe	ICC	Bangladesh Cricket Team	ODI	11/04/01	Zimbabwe	Zimbabwe won by 36 runs	Mohammad Sharif 0/77 (10 overs)
Bangladesh vs. Zimbabwe	ICC	Bangladesh Cricket Team	ODI	23/11/01	Zimbabwe	Zimbabwe won by 5 wickets	Mohammad Sharif 0/39 (7 overs)
Bangladesh vs. Zimbabwe	ICC	Bangladesh Cricket Team	ODI	26/11/01	Zimbabwe	Zimbabwe won by 7 wickets	Mohammad Sharif 0/37 (10 overs)
Bangladesh vs. Pakistan	ICC	Bangladesh Cricket Team	ODI	22/01/02	Pakistan	Pakistan won by 49 runs	Mohammad Sharif 3/40 (10 overs)
Bangladesh vs. Pakistan	ICC	Bangladesh Cricket Team	ODI	24/01/02	Pakistan	Pakistan won by 72 runs	Mohammad Sharif 2/59 (10 overs)
Bangladesh vs. Pakistan	ICC	Bangladesh Cricket Team	ODI	25/01/02	Pakistan	Pakistan won by 8 wickets	Mohammad Sharif 0/40 (6.3overs)
Bangladesh vs. Zimbabwe	ICC	Bangladesh Cricket Team	ODI	09/02/07	Zimbabwe	Bangladesh won by 14 runs	Mohammad Sharif 1/53 (9.5overs)
