= Mohammed Nazimuddin =

Bangladeshi cricketer (born 1985)

Nazimuddin
Personal information
- Full name: Mohammad Nazimuddin Ahmed
- Born: 1 October 1985 (age 41); Chittagong, Chittagong Division, Bangladesh
- Height: 5 ft 8 in (1.73 m)
- Batting: Right-handed
- Bowling: Right arm medium
- Role: Batsman

International information
- National side: Bangladesh (2007–2012)
- Test debut (cap 63): 9 December 2011 v Pakistan
- Last Test: 12 November 2012 v West Indies
- ODI debut (cap 90): 12 March 2008 v South Africa
- Last ODI: 22 March 2012 v Pakistan
- T20I debut (cap 15): 1 September 2007 v Kenya
- Last T20I: 20 April 2008 v Pakistan

Domestic team information
- Years: Team
- 2001–present: Chittagong Division
- 2008: Dhaka Warriors

Career statistics
Competition	Test	ODI	FC	LA
Matches	3	11	104	121
Runs scored	125	147	6,269	2,636
Batting average	20.83	13.36	36.66	24.18
100s/50s	0/1	0/0	12/36	1/17
Top score	78	47	205	108
Balls bowled	–	–	198	12
Wickets	–	–	2	1
Bowling average	–	–	68.50	14.00
5 wickets in innings	–	–	0	0
10 wickets in match	–	–	0	0
Best bowling	–	–	1/9	1/14
Catches/stumpings	1/–	1/–	39/–	24/–
Medal record
Men's Cricket
Representing Bangladesh
ACC Asia Cup
Runner-up	2012 Bangladesh
Asian Games
Gold medal – first place	2010 Guangzhou	Team
- Source: CricInfo, 3 December 2025

Mohammed Nazimuddin Ahmed (born 1 October 1985) is a Bangladeshi cricketer. A right-handed batsman, he is the captain of Chittagong Division, and has played Test, limited overs and Twenty20 cricket for Bangladesh.

Nazimuddin made his first-class debut at the age of 16. Over the following seasons he was selected to play in the Bangladesh A and Bangladesh Under-19 teams. He played his first senior match for Bangladesh in 2007, in a Twenty20 tournament in Kenya. He was also selected in the Bangladesh national squad that toured Australia in August and September 2008. However, he broke his finger in the warmup to the matches and could not participate. Later in 2008, he was part of a group of Bangladesh players banned from Bangladeshi cricket for ten years for playing in the private Indian Cricket League (ICL). When he left the ICL in 2009, the Bangladesh Cricket Board rescinded the ban.

Nazimuddin was recalled to the national team for the two-Test series against Pakistan in December 2011. He made his Test debut in the first match of the series in Chittagong, opening the batting for Bangladesh.
