= Suhrawadi Shuvo =

Bangladeshi cricketer (born 1988)

Sohrawordi Shuvo
Personal information
- Full name: Mohammad Sohrawordi Shuvo
- Born: 21 November 1988 (age 37); Jummapara, Rangpur, Bangladesh
- Batting: Left-handed
- Bowling: Slow left arm orthodox
- Role: Bowler

International information
- National side: Bangladesh
- Only Test (cap 62): 29 October 2011 v West Indies
- ODI debut (cap 97): 2 March 2010 v England
- Last ODI: 18 October 2011 v West Indies
- Only T20I (cap 27): 1 May 2010 v Pakistan

Domestic team information
- Years: Team
- 2004/05–2011/12: Rajshahi Division
- 2012: Barisal Burners
- 2012–present: Rangpur Division
- 2013–present: Sylhet Royals

Career statistics
Competition	Test	ODI	FC	LA
Matches	1	17	111	147
Runs scored	15	98	4,459	1,843
Batting average	7.50	14.00	33.02	20.70
100s/50s	0/0	0/0	5/26	1/5
Top score	15	20*	151	105*
Balls bowled	297	762	21,028	6,865
Wickets	4	14	364	175
Bowling average	36.50	40.85	27.90	28.72
5 wickets in innings	0	0	22	1
10 wickets in match	0	0	2	0
Best bowling	3/73	3/14	7/45	5/6
Catches/stumpings	0/–	9/–	75/–	55/–
Medal record
Representing Bangladesh
Men's Cricket
Asian Games
Gold medal – first place	2010 Guangzhou	Team
- Source: Cricinfo, 13 June 2024

Mohammad Sohrawordi Shuvo (born 21 November 1988) is a Bangladeshi international cricketer. He is a right-handed batsman and slow left-arm orthodox spin bowler. He played for Rajshahi Division from 2004/05 through the 2006/07 season and also appeared for Bangladesh Under-19s in 2005/06 and the Bangladesh Cricket Board Academy in 2006/07. He has taken five wickets in a first-class innings on 22 occasions, with career-best figures of 7 for 45 against Sylhet Division in 2016.

Shuvo was part of the 13-man Bangladesh squad that played in the 2010 Asian Games in late November. They faced Afghanistan in the final and won by five wickets, securing the country's first gold medal at the Asian Games.

He was the leading wicket-taker for Brothers Union in the 2017–18 Dhaka Premier Division Cricket League, with 24 dismissals in 13 matches.
