= Nazmul Hossain Milon =

Bangladeshi cricketer (born 1987)

Personal information
- Full name: Nazmul Hossain
- Born: 11 September 1987 (age 39); Tangail, Bangladesh
- Nickname: Milon
- Batting: Right-handed
- Bowling: Right-arm medium
- Role: All-rounder

Domestic team information
- Years: Team
- 2007–: Dhaka Division
- 2010: Sultans of Sylhet
- 2012: Khulna Royal Bengals
- 2013–: Sylhet Royals
- FC debut: 20 February 2007 Dhaka Division v Chittagong Division
- LA debut: 27 March 2007 Dhaka Division v Barisal Division

Career statistics
Competition	FC	LA	T20
Matches	17	29	20
Runs scored	634	592	219
Batting average	28.81	28.19	31.28
100s/50s	0/5	1/1	0/0
Top score	95*	144	42*
Balls bowled	573	251	7
Wickets	16	5	1
Bowling average	16.87	52.20	8.00
5 wickets in innings	0	0	0
10 wickets in match	0	0	0
Best bowling	4/28	3/58	1/8
Catches/stumpings	10/–	13/–	10/–
- Source: CricketArchive, 25 January 2013

Nazmul Hossain (born 11 September 1987), commonly referred to as Nazmul Hossain Milon is a Bangladeshi cricketer. He is a right-handed batsman and right-arm medium bowler and has represented Dhaka Division and Sylhet Division in first-class.

== Career overview ==
In the 2005–6 season, he played for the Bangladesh national under-19 cricket team in both one day international and limited overs matches. Hossain made his first-class debut for Dhaka Division in February 2007 and scored one first-class fifty in his maiden season, an unbeaten 65 against Khulna Division. His best performance in one day cricket came in April 2007 against Rajshahi Division, when batting at number 8 Hossain scored 144 off just 89 balls in an innings that included 11 fours and 9 sixes.
