= Shahriar Nafees =

Bangladeshi cricketer (born 1985)

Personal information
- Full name: Shahriar Nafees Ahmed
- Born: 1 May 1985 (age 41); Dhaka, Bangladesh
- Batting: Left-handed
- Bowling: Left Arm off-break
- Role: Top-order batsman
- Relatives: Iftekhar Nayem (brother); Faruk Ahmed (cousin)

International information
- National side: Bangladesh (2005–2013)
- Test debut (cap 43): 12 September 2005 v Sri Lanka
- Last Test: 17 April 2013 v Zimbabwe
- ODI debut (cap 77): 21 June 2005 v England
- Last ODI: 6 December 2011 v Pakistan
- Only T20I (cap 10): 28 November 2006 v Zimbabwe

Domestic team information
- Years: Team
- 2005–present: Barisal Blazers,
- 2008: Dhaka Warriors
- 2009/10: Barisal Blazers
- 2012: Barisal Burners
- 2013: Khulna Royal Bengal

Career statistics
Competition	Test	ODI	FC	LA
Matches	24	75	124	180
Runs scored	1,267	2,201	8,141	5,269
Batting average	26.39	31.44	38.40	32.32
100s/50s	1/7	4/13	15/48	9/30
Top score	138	123*	219	147
Balls bowled	–	–	96	–
Wickets	–	–	0	–
Bowling average	–	–	–	–
5 wickets in innings	–	–	–	–
10 wickets in match	–	–	–	–
Best bowling	–	–	–	–
Catches/stumpings	19/–	13/–	74/–	51/–
- Source: ESPNcricinfo, 17 April 2025

Shahriar Nafees Ahmed (Bengali: শাহরিয়ার নাফীস আহমেদ; born: 1 May 1985) is a former Bangladeshi cricketer, who played all formats of the game, and was also a former T20I captain for Bangladesh. He made his One Day International (ODI) debut for Bangladesh in 2005 against England, and later the same year played his first Test.

In 2008 he joined the Indian Cricket League (ICL) as part of the Dhaka Warriors. The members of the team were given 10-year bans by the Bangladesh Cricket Board for playing in the "rebel" league, but the bans were lifted when they Bangladeshi players left the league. Nafees later returned to the national team. Domestically he played for Barisal Division. In February 2021, Nafees announced his retirement from all forms of cricket.

== Personal life ==
Nafees was born on 1 May 1985 at Combined Military Hospital in Dhaka Cantonment. He is the eldest of three sons of retired army officer Mohiuddin Ahmed and his wife Salma Anjum. He completed his secondary education from St Joseph Higher Secondary School in 2001 and his higher secondary education from Notre Dame College in 2003. Then, he got himself admitted into University of Dhaka in 2003-04 for his bachelor's degree.

At University of Dhaka, Nafees met Eshita Tasmin, whom he married later. They have a son and a daughter.

== International career ==
Nafees first played in the national team in Bangladesh's maiden tour of England (2005). Nafees scored his maiden first-class century, as well as his first in Tests, at Fatullah in April 2006 against Australia. He scored his maiden one-day hundred against Zimbabwe in August 2006. Nafees held the record for the highest individual score for Bangladesh in Champions Trophy until Tamim Iqbal surpassed his milestone

Nafees was appointed vice-captain for the Champions Trophy in India in October 2006 with the view of grooming a successor for Habibul Bashar. The tournament was a successful one for him as he scored his second ODI century, again Zimbabwe were his opponents. He scored his third century against Zimbabwe again in November. Nafees finished 2006 with over 1,000 ODI runs, becoming the first Bangladeshi to pass the milestone in a calendar year.

Once again available to play for Bangladesh, Nafees returned to the squad for the first time since joining the ICL in preparation for Bangladesh's home series against India in January. Bangladesh lost both Tests, and Nafees played in one, scoring 25 runs. His Test come-back lasted one match and Nafees would have to wait more than 18 months before playing another Test. He made his return in an ODI series against New Zealand in October 2010 in which he scored 35 as Bangladesh won that match and 73 in the next match as Bangladesh once again took a seven-wicket victory. Despite his good performance Nafees was originally selected on the grounds that Tamim Iqbal was injured and eventually made way for him in the series against Zimbabwe and he was placed on standby in case of an injury. In the first two years after his return from the ICL Nafees played just four ODIs.

Included in Bangladesh's squad for the 2011 World Cup, Nafees played in two matches (scoring 42 runs) as the team exited the tournament in the group stage. He was retained in the squad to face Australia in three ODIs immediately after the World Cup finished in April, and struck two half-centuries that cemented his place in the team. Nafees was recalled to the squad to face Zimbabwe in August. In the one-off Test, his first since January 2010, he made scores of 50 and 9 as Bangladesh unexpectedly slid to defeat.

After scoring 82 runs including a half-century in the first Test against the West Indies in October, Nafees endured a run of low scores across Tests and ODIs that jeopardised his place in the team. He responded by striking an innings of 97 against Pakistan in the second match of a two-Test series. The 180-run partnership was a landmark in several ways: it was record for Bangladesh's fifth wicket, the first time the team had batted through a whole session without losing a wicket since March 2010, and the team's first century partnership in Tests since June 2010.

=== Captaincy ===
He was the first T20I captain for Bangladesh and also he's the youngest T20I captain for Bangladesh at the age of 21 years and 211 days.

== Domestic career ==
In June 2008 Nafees joined the unauthorised Indian Cricket League and was given a ten-year ban by the Bangladesh Cricket Board (BCB) however he severed his ties with the league in September 2009 and was therefore available for national selection.

The Bangladesh Cricket Board founded the six-team Bangladesh Premier League in 2012, a twenty20 tournament to be held in February that year. The BCB made Shahriar the 'icon player' for Barisal Burners. Despite his status, Nafees played just five matches, scoring 38 runs.

In the 2nd edition of BPL held in 2013, he joined Khulna Royal Bengals. He was selected as the captain of the team. He scored the maiden century in BPL 2. Before him, no other Bangladeshi player scored a century in the history of BPL.

He was the leading run-scorer for Agrani Bank Cricket Club in the 2017–18 Dhaka Premier Division Cricket League, with 550 runs in 13 matches.

== Retirement and aftermath ==
On 13 February 2021, Nafees along with Abdur Razzak, announced his retirement from all forms of cricket. Soon after his retirement, he was offered a position in the cricket operations department of Bangladesh Cricket Board.

After his retirement form cricket he joined a faculty of University of Scholars.

== International centuries ==
Test centuries by Shahriar Nafees
No.	Runs	Against	Venue	H/A	Date	Result	Ref
1	138	Australia	Khan Shaheb Osman Ali Stadium, Fatullah	Home	9 April 2006	Lost	

One Day International centuries by Shahriar Nafees
No.	Runs	Against	Venue	H/A/N	Date	Result	Ref
1	118 not out	Zimbabwe	Harare Sports Club, Harare	Away	6 August 2006	Won	
2	123 not out	Zimbabwe	Sawai Mansingh Stadium, Jaipur	Neutral	13 October 2006	Won	
3	105 not out	Zimbabwe	Sheikh Abu Naser Stadium, Khulna	Home	30 November 2006	Won	
4	104 not out	Bermuda	Antigua Recreation Ground, St. John's	Neutral	25 February 2007	Won	

== Awards ==
- 2006 – nominated for International Cricket Council Emerging Player of the Year
- 2006 – BCB Cricketer of the Year
- 2006 – BCB Best Batsman of the Year
- 2006 – Grameenphone Prothom-Alo Sportsperson of the Year
