= Mahmudul Hasan (cricketer, born 1990) =

Bangladeshi cricketer (born 1990)

Personal information
- Full name: Mahmadul Hasan
- Born: 10 December 1990 (age 35); Gaibandha, Bangladesh
- Batting: Right-handed
- Bowling: Right-arm offbreak
- Role: All-rounder

Domestic team information
- Years: Team
- 2008/09–2010/11: Chittagong Division
- 2011/12–: Rangpur Division
- 2012/13: Barisal Burners
- 2015/16: Comilla Victorians
- 2016/17: Chittagong Vikings
- 2018/19: Dhaka Dynamites

Career statistics
Competition	First-class
Matches	83
Runs scored	2,744
Batting average	22.12
100s/50s	1/14
Top score	135
Balls bowled	10,336
Wickets	143
Bowling average	34.93
5 wickets in innings	6
10 wickets in match	0
Best bowling	5/38
Catches/stumpings	70/–
- Source: Cricinfo, 21 November 2024

Mahmudul Hasan is a Bangladeshi cricketer who plays as a batsman and off-spinner for Rangpur Division.

== Youth career ==
Mahmudul Hasan has represented Bangladesh at the under-19 level. He has the unflattering record of being the only batsman removed for the highest number of ducks in U19 One Day International (ODI) history, with seven.

He has played for Bangladesh U19 team in nine Test matches and 54 One Day Internationals. He captained the side in his first five ODIs, and was a member of Bangladesh's squad in the 2008 Under-19 Cricket World Cup. He made his first-class debut for Chittagong Division in October 2008.
