= Dhiman Ghosh =

Bangladeshi cricketer (born 1987)

Personal information
- Born: 23 November 1987 (age 38); Dinajpur, Bangladesh
- Batting: Right-handed
- Role: Wicket-keeper

International information
- National side: Bangladesh
- ODI debut (cap 87): 9 March 2008 v South Africa
- Last ODI: 6 September 2008 v Australia
- Only T20I (cap 19): 20 April 2008 v Pakistan

Domestic team information
- Years: Team
- 2004–2007: Chittagong Division
- 2007–2011: Rajshahi Division
- 2008: Dhaka Warriors
- 2011–2021: Rangpur Division
- 2013: Rangpur Riders

Career statistics
Competition	ODI	T20I	FC	LA
Matches	14	1	137	141
Runs scored	126	1	6,840	3,046
Batting average	14.00	1.00	36.00	29.86
100s/50s	0/0	0/0	12/41	1/13
Top score	30	1	183	147
Balls bowled	–	–	633	6
Wickets	–	–	16	0
Bowling average	–	–	26.93	–
5 wickets in innings	–	–	0	–
10 wickets in match	–	–	0	–
Best bowling	–	–	4/46	–
Catches/stumpings	9/4	0/1	287/42	108/49
- Source: ESPNcricinfo, 14 June 2024

Dhiman Ghosh (born 23 November 1987) is a Bangladeshi former first-class cricketer. He represented Bangladesh through the age group levels, playing for Bangladesh A in 2003–04 and 2004–05, and appeared in Under-19 Tests and ODIs. He played 14 ODIs and one T20I for Bangladesh in 2008.

Dhiman was born in Dinajpur. A right-handed batsman and wicket-keeper, he scored 12 first-class centuries. Also an occasional off-break bowler, his best spell of bowling in first-class cricket was four wickets for 46 runs.

He made his full international debut in a One Day International against South Africa in Chittagong in March 2008, and became the first-choice wicketkeeper for Bangladesh for most of the year ahead of Mushfiqur Rahim, although Mushfiqur returned for the 2008 Asia Cup matches. Dhiman played in one T20 International against Pakistan in April 2008, and in ODI series against Ireland, Pakistan and Australia, and played his most recent ODI in September 2008. He was dropped when Mushfiqur returned to form, and risked giving up his international career when he signed for the Dhaka Warriors in the Indian Cricket League.

He was banned for 10 years by the Bangladesh Cricket Board for participating in the "rebel" tournament, but along with other Bangladeshi players left the ICL in 2009 after an amnesty was offered. He continued to play domestic cricket in Bangladesh, but was not selected for the national team after 2008.
