= 2016–17 Dhaka Premier Division Cricket League =

Cricket tournament

- Dates: 12 April 2017 – 8 June 2017
- Administrator: Bangladesh Cricket Board
- Cricket format: List A
- Tournament format: Round-robin
- Champions: Gazi Group Cricketers (1st title)
- Participants: 12
- Matches: 84
- Most runs: Litton Das (752)
- Most wickets: Abu Hider (35)

The 2016–17 Dhaka Premier Division Cricket League was the fourth edition of the Dhaka Premier Division Cricket League, a List A cricket competition held in Bangladesh between April and June 2017. The tournament started on 12 April 2017 with player transfers beginning on 17 March 2017. Abahani Limited were the defending champions.

The first part of the tournament was played as a round-robin, before progressing to the championship and relegation phase. In the first relegation play-off match, Khelaghar Samaj Kallyan Samity defeated Partex Sporting Club by 8 wickets, therefore relegating Partex and Victoria Sporting Club to the Dhaka First Division Cricket League.

The tournament was won by Gazi Group Cricketers, their first title. Gazi Group, along with Abahani Limited and Prime Doleshwar Sporting Club finished level on points at the end of the Super League phase of the tournament. Gazi Group were crowned champions, having won the most head-to-head matches among the three teams.

== Points tables ==
Group stage

Team	Pld	W	L	NR	Pts	NRR
Gazi Group Cricketers	11	9	2	0	18	+0.404
Abahani Limited	11	8	3	0	16	+1.014
Prime Doleshwar Sporting Club	11	8	3	0	16	+0.583
Prime Bank Cricket Club	11	8	3	0	16	+0.529
Sheikh Jamal Dhanmondi Club	11	7	4	0	14	+0.051
Mohammedan Sporting Club	11	6	5	0	12	–0.125
Legends of Rupganj	11	6	5	0	12	–0.192
Brothers Union	11	5	6	0	10	+0.424
Kala Bagan Krira Chakra	11	4	7	0	8	–0.129
Khelaghar Samaj Kallyan Samity	11	3	8	0	6	–0.336
Partex Sporting Club	11	1	10	0	2	–0.814
Victoria Sporting Club	11	1	10	0	2	–1.308

Team qualified for the Super League phase of the tournament

Super League

Team	Pld	W	L	NR	Pts	NRR
Abahani Limited	16	12	4	0	24	+1.112
Gazi Group Cricketers	16	12	4	0	24	+0.601
Prime Doleshwar Sporting Club	16	12	4	0	24	+0.537
Prime Bank Cricket Club	16	10	6	0	20	+0.292
Mohammedan Sporting Club	16	8	8	0	16	–0.350
Sheikh Jamal Dhanmondi Club	16	7	9	0	14	–0.464

Champions (based on head-to-head record)

Relegation League

Team	Pld	W	L	NR	Pts	NRR
Khelaghar Samaj Kallyan Samity	13	5	8	0	10	+0.310
Victoria Sporting Club	13	2	11	0	6	–1.454
Partex Sporting Club	13	1	12	0	2	–1.095

Team relegated to the Dhaka First Division Cricket League

== Fixtures ==
=== Round Robin ===
==== April ====
12 April 2017
Scorecard

Khelaghar; 293/6 (50 overs)	v	Abahani Limited; 297/5 (47.3 overs)
Nafees Iqbal 78* (68); Mohammad Saifuddin 3/45 (10 overs)		Mosaddek Hossain 110 (85); Sadiqur Rahman 2/36 (9 overs)

Abahani Limited won by 5 wickets
Khan Shaheb Osman Ali Stadium, Fatullah
Umpires: Mahfuzur Rahman and Tanvir Ahmed
Player of the match: Mosaddek Hossain (Abahani Limited)

- Khelaghar Samaj Kallyan Samity won the toss and elected to bat.
- Kazi Anik (Abahani Limited), Ariful Islam, Masum Khan and Salauddin Pappu (Khelaghar Samaj Kallyan Samity) all made their List A debuts.

12 April 2017
Scorecard

Brothers Union; 206/9 (50 overs)	v	Legends of Rupganj; 207/6 (46.1 overs)
Myshukur Rahaman 65 (90); Mohammad Sharif 3/25 (9 overs)		Mushfiqur Rahim 75* (103); Abhishek Nayar 2/22 (9 overs)

Legends of Rupganj won by 4 wickets
Krira Shikkha Protisthan No 4 Ground, Savar
Umpires: Morshed Ali Khan and Nadir Shah
Player of the match: Mushfiqur Rahim (Legends of Rupganj)

- Brothers Union won the toss and elected to bat.
- Merajul Hoque (Brothers Union) made his List A debut.

12 April 2017
Scorecard

Prime Doleshwar Sporting Club; 287/9 (50 overs)	v	Partex Sporting Club; 209/9 (50 overs)
Abdul Mazid 77 (83); Golam Kabir 3/41 (5 overs)		Yashpal Singh 74 (96); Arafat Sunny 5/33 (10 overs)

Prime Doleshwar Sporting Club won by 78 runs
Bangladesh Krira Shikkha Protisthan No 3 Ground, Savar
Umpires: Imran Parvez and Sharfuddoula
Player of the match: Arafat Sunny (Prime Doleshwar Sporting Club)

- Prime Doleshwar Sporting Club won the toss and elected to bat.
- Hafiz Al-Hasan and Shahanur Rahman (Partex Sporting Club) both made their List A debuts.

13 April 2017
Scorecard

Mohammedan Sporting Club; 220/8 (50 overs)	v	Gazi Group Cricketers; 223/3 (37 overs)
Rahmat Shah 78 (91); Mahedi Hasan 2/29 (10 overs)		Nasir Hossain 106* (106); Taijul Islam 2/61 (9 overs)

Gazi Group Cricketers won by 7 wickets
Bangladesh Krira Shikkha Protisthan No 3 Ground, Savar
Umpires: Morshed Ali Khan and Sharfuddoula
Player of the match: Nasir Hossain (Gazi Group Cricketers)

- Gazi Group Cricketers won the toss and elected to field.

13 April 2017
Scorecard

Kala Bagan Krira Chakra; 184 (46.2 overs)	v	Prime Bank Cricket Club; 186/5 (46.5 overs)
Tushar Imran 47 (52); Rubel Hossain 6/21 (8.2 overs)		Unmukt Chand 61* (100); Sanjit Saha 3/25 (10 overs)

Prime Bank Cricket Club won by 5 wickets
Bangladesh Krira Shikkha Protisthan No 4 Ground, Savar
Umpires: Gazi Sohel and Nadir Shah
Player of the match: Rubel Hossain (Prime Bank Cricket Club)

- Prime Bank Cricket Club won the toss and elected to field.

13 April 2017
Scorecard

Victoria Sporting Club; 209 (48.2 overs)	v	Sheikh Jamal; 210/8 (49.2 overs)
Uttam Sarkar 88 (102); Abdur Razzak 4/29 (10 overs)		Nurul Hasan 80 (94); Monir Hossain 3/36 (10 overs)

Sheikh Jamal Dhanmondi Club won by 2 wickets
Khan Shaheb Osman Ali Stadium, Fatullah
Umpires: Akteruzzaman and Mahfuzur Rahman
Player of the match: Nurul Hasan (Sheikh Jamal Dhanmondi Club)

- Victoria Sporting Club won the toss and elected to bat.
- Mehdi Mahbub, Mohimenul Khan, Moinul Islam and Shafiul Hayet (Victoria Sporting Club) all made their List A debuts.

17 April 2017
Scorecard

Legends of Rupganj; 305/5 (50 overs)	v	Sheikh Jamal; 237 (46.2 overs)
Mushfiqur Rahim 134 (134); Shahadat Hossain 2/52 (9 overs)		Ziaur Rahman 42 (38); Naeem Islam 2/21 (6 overs)

Legends of Rupganj won by 68 runs
Bangladesh Krira Shikkha Protisthan No 4 Ground, Savar
Umpires: Anisur Rahman and Gazi Sohel
Player of the match: Mushfiqur Rahim (Legends of Rupganj)

- Legends of Rupganj won the toss and elected to bat.

17 April 2017
Scorecard

Partex Sporting Club; 234/7 (50 overs)	v	Abahani Limited; 237/3 (38.3 overs)
Jubair Ahmed 50 (69); Shuvagata Hom 2/45 (10 overs)		Najmul Hossain Shanto 101* (109); Mamun Hossain 1/20 (6 overs)

Abahani Limited won by 7 wickets
Bangladesh Krira Shikkha Protisthan No 3 Ground, Savar
Umpires: Akteruzzaman and Mahfuzur Rahman
Player of the match: Najmul Hossain Shanto (Abahani Limited)

- Partex Sporting Club won the toss and elected to bat.
- Mamun Hossain and Sabbir Hossain (Partex Sporting Club) both made their List A debuts.

17 April 2017
Scorecard

Brothers Union; 246/9 (50 overs)	v	Prime Doleshwar Sporting Club; 247/6 (48.3 overs)
Junaid Siddique 87 (115); Arafat Sunny 4/45 (10 overs)		Imtiaz Hossain 99 (143); Saddam Hossain 3/55 (9.3 overs)

Prime Doleshwar Sporting Club won by 4 wickets
Khan Shaheb Osman Ali Stadium, Fatullah
Umpires: Masudur Rahman and Nadir Shah
Player of the match: Imtiaz Hossain (Prime Doleshwar Sporting Club)

- Prime Doleshwar Sporting Club won the toss and elected to field.

18 April 2017
Scorecard

Victoria Sporting Club; 177 (48.4 overs)	v	Gazi Group Cricketers; 181/2 (31.2 overs)
Uttam Sarkar 29 (43); Parvez Rasool 4/28 (10 overs)		Jahurul Islam 52 (71); Mohammad Arafat 1/22 (4 overs)

Gazi Group Cricketers won by 8 wickets
Khan Shaheb Osman Ali Stadium, Fatullah
Umpires: Masudur Rahman and Nadir Shah
Player of the match: Parvez Rasool (Gazi Group Cricketers)

- Victoria Sporting Club won the toss and elected to bat.

18 April 2017
Scorecard

Mohammedan Sporting Club; 307/9 (50 overs)	v	Kala Bagan Krira Chakra; 283/9 (50 overs)
Tamim Iqbal 157 (125); Sanjit Saha 4/52 (10 overs)		Hamilton Masakadza 68 (81); Kamrul Islam Rabbi 3/69 (10 overs)

Mohammedan Sporting Club won by 24 runs
Bangladesh Krira Shikkha Protisthan No 4 Ground, Savar
Umpires: Mahfuzur Rahman and Sharfuddoula
Player of the match: Tamim Iqbal (Mohammedan Sporting Club)

- Mohammedan Sporting Club won the toss and elected to bat.

18 April 2017
Scorecard

Prime Bank Cricket Club; 307/6 (50 overs)	v	Khelaghar Samaj Kallyan Samity; 248 (47.1 overs)
Al-Amin 106* (94); Shamsul Alam 2/62 (9 overs)		Nazmus Sadat 56 (54); Nahidul Islam 2/31 (6 overs)

Prime Bank Cricket Club won by 59 runs
Bangladesh Krira Shikkha Protisthan No 4 Ground, Savar
Umpires: Anisur Rahman and Gazi Sohel
Player of the match: Al-Amin (Prime Bank Cricket Club)

- Prime Bank Cricket Club won the toss and elected to bat.
- Arifurzaman Sagor (Khelaghar Samaj Kallyan Samity) made his List A debut.

20 April 2017
Scorecard

Abahani Limited; 327/6 (50 overs)	v	Brothers Union; 295/8 (50 overs)
Uday Kaul 94 (120); Alok Kapali 2/46 (10 overs)		Junaid Siddique 114 (112); Shuvagata Hom 3/45 (10 overs)

Abahani Limited won by 32 runs
Khan Shaheb Osman Ali Stadium, Fatullah
Umpires: Akteruzzaman and Anisur Rahman
Player of the match: Shuvagata Hom (Abahani Limited)

- Abahani Limited won the toss and elected to bat.
- Yeasin Arafat (Brothers Union) made his List A debut.

20 April 2017
Scorecard

Sheikh Jamal; 235/7 (38 overs)	v	Prime Doleshwar Sporting Club; 230/7 (38 overs)
Imrul Kayes 67 (74); Habibur Rahman 2/44 (8 overs)		Puneet Bisht 83 (60); Abdur Razzak 3/39 (8 overs)

Sheikh Jamal Dhanmondi Club won by 5 runs
Bangladesh Krira Shikkha Protisthan No 4 Ground, Savar
Umpires: Gazi Sohel and Mahfuzur Rahman
Player of the match: Abdur Razzak (Sheikh Jamal Dhanmondi Club)

- Sheikh Jamal Dhanmondi Club won the toss and elected to bat.

20 April 2017
Scorecard

Legends of Rupganj; 156 (44 overs)	v	Gazi Group Cricketers; 157/2 (36 overs)
Mosharraf Hossain 37 (48); Abu Hider 4/26 (9 overs)		Jahurul Islam 62* (106); Mahmudul Hasan 1/27 (6 overs)

Gazi Group Cricketers won by 8 wickets
Bangladesh Krira Shikkha Protisthan No 3 Ground, Savar
Umpires: Masudur Rahman and Nadir Shah
Player of the match: Abu Hider (Gazi Group Cricketers)

- Legends of Rupganj won the toss and elected to bat.

21 April 2017
Scorecard

Mohammedan Sporting Club; 142 (36.1 overs)	v	Prime Bank Cricket Club; 150/3 (27.4 overs)
Tamim Iqbal 46 (67); Al-Amin 5/25 (6 overs)		Sabbir Rahman 78* (75); Enamul Haque 1/15 (3 overs)

Prime Bank Cricket Club won by 7 wickets (D/L method)
Khan Shaheb Osman Ali Stadium, Fatullah
Umpires: Gazi Sohel and Nadir Shah
Player of the match: Al-Amin (Prime Bank Cricket Club)

- Prime Bank Cricket Club won the toss and elected to field.

21 April 2017
Scorecard

Khelaghar Samaj Kallyan Samity; 288/8 (50 overs)	v	Partex Sporting Club; 211 (45.1 overs)
Amit Majumder 101 (85); Jubair Ahmed 3/69 (10 overs)		Jubair Ahmed 44 (63); Ariful Islam 3/24 (9.1 overs)

Khelaghar Samaj Kallyan Samity won by 77 runs
Bangladesh Krira Shikkha Protisthan No 4 Ground, Savar
Umpires: Anisur Rahman and Morshed Ali Khan
Player of the match: Amit Majumder (Khelaghar Samaj Kallyan Samity)

- Partex Sporting Club won the toss and elected to field.
- Tanvir Islam (Khelaghar Samaj Kallyan Samity) made his List A debut.
- Amit Majumder (Khelaghar Samaj Kallyan Samity) made his first List A century.

21 April 2017
Scorecard

Kala Bagan Krira Chakra; 259/6 (50 overs)	v	Victoria Sporting Club; 249/9 (50 overs)
Mehrab Hossain 63 (108); Monir Hossain 2/46 (10 overs)		Moinul Islam 75 (57); Abul Hasan 2/31 (10 overs)

Kalabagan Krira Chakra won by 10 runs
Bangladesh Krira Shikkha Protisthan No 3 Ground, Savar
Umpires: Mahfuzur Rahman and Moniruzzaman
Player of the match: Muktar Ali (Kalabagan Krira Chakra)

- Victoria Sporting Club won the toss and elected to field.

26 April 2017
Scorecard

Abahani Limited; 269 (50 overs)	v	Sheikh Jamal; 270/4 (48 overs)
Mahmudullah 62 (66); Tanbir Hayder 4/45 (10 overs)		Ziaur Rahman 73* (57); Mohammad Saifuddin 1/36 (5 overs)

Sheikh Jamal Dhanmondi Club won by 6 wickets
Khan Shaheb Osman Ali Stadium, Fatullah
Umpires: Masudur Rahman and Tanvir Ahmed
Player of the match: Ziaur Rahman (Sheikh Jamal Dhanmondi Club)

- Abahani Limited won the toss and elected to bat.

26 April 2017
Scorecard

Gazi Group Cricketers; 307 (48.2 overs)	v	Prime Doleshwar Sporting Club; 272/9 (50 overs)
Mominul Haque 152 (120); Farhad Reza 4/41 (9.2 overs)		Samiullah Shinwari 55 (66); Nasir Hossain 3/40 (10 overs)

Gazi Group Cricketers won by 35 runs
Bangladesh Krira Shikkha Protisthan No 3 Ground, Savar
Umpires: Mahfuzur Rahman and Morshed Ali Khan
Player of the match: Mominul Haque (Gazi Group Cricketers)

- Prime Doleshwar Sporting Club won the toss and elected to field.
- Jaker Ali (Prime Doleshwar Sporting Club) made his List A debut.
- Mominul Haque (Gazi Group Cricketers) made the third-highest List A score in Bangladesh cricket.

26 April 2017
Scorecard

Kala Bagan Krira Chakra; 176/8 (27 overs)	v	Legends of Rupganj; 178/7 (26.4 overs)
Mehrab Hossain 79* (81); Mosharraf Hossain 2/28 (5 overs)		Mushfiqur Rahim 44 (53); Muktar Ali 2/23 (5.4 overs)

Legends of Rupganj won by 3 wickets
Bangladesh Krira Shikkha Protisthan No 4 Ground, Savar
Umpires: Gazi Sohel and Nadir Shah
Player of the match: Mashrafe Mortaza (Legends of Rupganj)

- Legends of Rupganj won the toss and elected to field.
- The match was reduced to 27 overs per side.

27 April 2017
Scorecard

Prime Bank Cricket Club; 283 (49.4 overs)	v	Victoria Sporting Club; 153 (33.5 overs)
Mehedi Maruf 101 (103); Monir Hossain 3/44 (10 overs)		Shafiul Hayet 42 (62); Ariful Haque 3/14 (2.5 overs)

Prime Bank Cricket Club won by 130 runs
Bangladesh Krira Shikkha Protisthan No 4 Ground, Savar
Umpires: Gazi Sohel and Tanvir Ahmed
Player of the match: Mehedi Maruf (Prime Bank Cricket Club)

- Victoria Sporting Club won the toss and elected to field.

27 April 2017
Scorecard

Khelaghar Samaj Kallyan Samity; 189 (45.4 overs)	v	Mohammedan Sporting Club; 190/6 (44.5 overs)
Robiul Islam Robi 63 (73); Enamul Haque 3/33 (10 overs)		Raqibul Hasan 76* (92); Robiul Islam Robi 3/20 (6 overs)

Mohammedan Sporting Club won by 4 wickets
Khan Shaheb Osman Ali Stadium, Fatullah
Umpires: Mahfuzur Rahman and Nadir Shah
Player of the match: Raqibul Hasan (Mohammedan Sporting Club)

- Khelaghar Samaj Kallyan Samity won the toss and elected to bat.

27 April 2017
Scorecard

Partex Sporting Club; 102 (30.5 overs)	v	Brothers Union; 103/3 (17.5 overs)
Sajjadul Haque 42 (44); Nihaduzzaman 4/21 (8.5 overs)		Farhad Hossain 35* (36); Rajibul Islam 1/9 (3 overs)

Brothers Union won by 7 wickets
Bangladesh Krira Shikkha Protisthan No 3 Ground, Savar
Umpires: Masudur Rahman and Morshed Ali Khan
Player of the match: Nihaduzzaman (Brothers Union)

- Brothers Union won the toss and elected to field.

29 April 2017
Scorecard

Gazi Group Cricketers; 282/9 (50 overs)	v	Abahani Limited; 257 (48.1 overs)
Anamul Haque 97 (109); Mohammad Saifuddin 3/56 (10 overs)		Afif Hossain 76* (80); Alauddin Babu 3/45 (9 overs)

Gazi Group Cricketers won by 25 runs
Bangladesh Krira Shikkha Protisthan No 3 Ground, Savar
Umpires: Mahfuzur Rahman and Nadir Shah
Player of the match: Parvez Rasool (Gazi Group Cricketers)

- Abahani Limited won the toss and elected to field.
- Sujon Hawlader (Abahani Limited), Hossain Ali and Munim Shahriar (Gazi Group Cricketers) all made their List A debuts.

29 April 2017
Scorecard

Prime Doleshwar Sporting Club; 202/9 (50 overs)	v	Kala Bagan Krira Chakra; 201 (49.2 overs)
Shahriar Nafees 39 (93); Sanjit Saha 4/28 (9 overs)		Tasamul Haque 89 (126); Farhad Reza 3/32 (9.2 overs)

Prime Doleshwar Sporting Club won by 1 run
Khan Shaheb Osman Ali Stadium, Fatullah
Umpires: Gazi Sohel and Morshed Ali Khan
Player of the match: Sharifullah (Prime Doleshwar Sporting Club)

- Kalabagan Krira Chakra won the toss and elected to field.
- Nahid Hasan (Kalabagan Krira Chakra) made his List A debut.

29 April 2017
Scorecard

Prime Bank Cricket Club; 284/6 (50 overs)	v	Legends of Rupganj; 218 (49.2 overs)
Rafatullah Mohmand 128 (125); Mohammad Sharif 3/42 (10 overs)		Naeem Islam 95 (127); Al-Amin Hossain 5/49 (9 overs)

Prime Bank Cricket Club won by 66 runs
Bangladesh Krira Shikkha Protisthan No 4 Ground, Savar
Umpires: Masudur Rahman and Tanvir Ahmed
Player of the match: Rafatullah Mohmand (Prime Bank Cricket Club)

- Prime Bank Cricket Club won the toss and elected to bat.

30 April 2017
Scorecard

Victoria Sporting Club; 154 (40 overs)	v	Mohammedan Sporting Club; 158/3 (30 overs)
Rubel Mia 42 (58); Taijul Islam 4/37 (8 overs)		Shamsur Rahman 74* (77); Monir Hossain 1/19 (10 overs)

Mohammedan Sporting Club won by 7 wickets
Bangladesh Krira Shikkha Protisthan No 4 Ground, Savar
Umpires: Mahfuzur Rahman and Shafiuddin Ahmed
Player of the match: Shamsur Rahman (Mohammedan Sporting Club)

- Mohammedan Sporting Club won the toss and elected to field.

30 April 2017
Scorecard

Partex Sporting Club; 201 (46.3 overs)	v	Sheikh Jamal; 202/7 (45.2 overs)
Jony Talukdar 65 (84); Abdur Razzak 5/22 (8.3 overs)		Mahbubul Karim 42 (27); Mamun Hossain 3/37 (7.2 overs)

Sheikh Jamal Dhanmondi Club won by 3 wickets
Khan Shaheb Osman Ali Stadium, Fatullah
Umpires: Akteruzzaman and Tanvir Ahmed
Player of the match: Abdur Razzak (Sheikh Jamal Dhanmondi Club)

- Partex Sporting Club won the toss and elected to bat.
- Imran Ali (Partex Sporting Club) made his List A debut.

30 April 2017
Scorecard

Brothers Union; 267/6 (50 overs)	v	Khelaghar Samaj Kallyan Samity; 196/9 (50 overs)
Myshukur Rahaman 84* (90); Tanvir Islam 3/49 (10 overs)		Nazimuddin 68 (100); Nihaduzzaman 3/37 (10 overs)

Brothers Union won by 71 runs
Bangladesh Krira Shikkha Protisthan No 3 Ground, Savar
Umpires: Imran Parvez and Masudur Rahman
Player of the match: Myshukur Rahaman (Brothers Union)

- Khelaghar Samaj Kallyan Samity won the toss and elected to field.
- Milon Kumar (Khelaghar Samaj Kallyan Samity) made his List A debut.

==== May ====
2 May 2017
Scorecard

Kala Bagan Krira Chakra; 156 (45.5 overs)	v	Abahani Limited; 161/4 (30.2 overs)
Tushar Imran 36 (60); Shuvagata Hom 4/19 (10 overs)		Saif Hassan 61 (62); Abul Hasan 2/20 (4 overs)

Abahani Limited won by 6 wickets
Bangladesh Krira Shikkha Protisthan No 4 Ground, Savar
Umpires: Anisur Rahman and Shafiuddin Ahmed
Player of the match: Shuvagata Hom (Abahani Limited)

- Abahani Limited won the toss and elected to field.
- Mosabbek Hossain (Kalabagan Krira Chakra) made his List A debut.

2 May 2017
Scorecard

Prime Doleshwar Sporting Club; 180 (49.5 overs)	v	Partex Sporting Club; 181/3 (45.2 overs)
Zakir Hasan 52 (103); Delwar Hossain 3/17 (8 overs)		Shahriar Nafees 78* (125); Al-Amin Hossain 2/26 (8 overs)

Prime Doleshwar Sporting Club won by 7 wickets
Khan Shaheb Osman Ali Stadium, Fatullah
Umpires: Imran Parvez and Masudur Rahman
Player of the match: Delwar Hossain (Prime Doleshwar Sporting Club)

- Prime Bank Cricket Club won the toss and elected to bat.

2 May 2017
Scorecard

Mohammedan Sporting Club; 135 (39.4 overs)	v	Legends of Rupganj; 84 (32.4 overs)
Raqibul Hasan 24 (34); Asif Hasan 4/19 (5.4 overs)		Mosharraf Hossain 22 (60); Taijul Islam 6/24 (10 overs)

Mohammedan Sporting Club won by 51 runs
Bangladesh Krira Shikkha Protisthan No 3 Ground, Savar
Umpires: Mahfuzur Rahman and Tanvir Ahmed
Player of the match: Taijul Islam (Mohammedan Sporting Club)

- Legends of Rupganj won the toss and elected to field.

3 May 2017
Scorecard

Khelaghar Samaj Kallyan Samity; 303/7 (50 overs)	v	Victoria Sporting Club; 246/9 (50 overs)
Robiul Islam Robi 107 (115); Rubel Mia 3/58 (8 overs)		Mohammad Arafat 47* (41); Suraj Randiv 3/34 (10 overs)

Khelaghar Samaj Kallyan Samity won by 57 runs
Bangladesh Krira Shikkha Protisthan No 3 Ground, Savar
Umpires: Anisur Rahman and Tanvir Ahmed
Player of the match: Robiul Islam Robi (Khelaghar Samaj Kallyan Samity)

- Victoria Sporting Club won the toss and elected to field.
- Robiul Islam Robi (Khelaghar Samaj) made his first century in a List A match.

3 May 2017
Scorecard

Sheikh Jamal; 309/7 (50 overs)	v	Brothers Union; 217 (43.5 overs)
Prashant Chopra 106 (116); Kazi Kamrul Islam 2/51 (10 overs)		Farhad Hossain 70 (79); Tanbir Hayder 5/41 (8.5 overs)

Sheikh Jamal Dhanmondi Club won by 92 runs
Khan Shaheb Osman Ali Stadium, Fatullah
Umpires: Imran Parvez and Masudur Rahman
Player of the match: Prashant Chopra (Sheikh Jamal Dhanmondi Club)

- Sheikh Jamal Dhanmondi Club won the toss and elected to bat.
- Tanbir Hayder (Sheikh Jamal) took his first five-wicket haul in a List A match.

3 May 2017
Scorecard

Partex Sporting Club; 270/9 (50 overs)	v	Gazi Group Cricketers; 271/6 (49 overs)
Irfan Sukkur 69 (77); Hossain Ali 2/21 (6 overs)		Jahurul Islam 96 (122); Jubair Ahmed 2/32 (6 overs)

Gazi Group Cricketers won by 4 wickets
Bangladesh Krira Shikkha Protisthan No 4 Ground, Savar
Umpires: Akteruzzaman and Mahfuzur Rahman
Player of the match: Jahurul Islam (Gazi Group Cricketers)

- Gazi Group Cricketers won the toss and elected to field.

5 May 2017
Scorecard

Abahani Limited; 305 (49.2 overs)	v	Prime Bank Cricket Club; 198 (44.5 overs)
Shadman Islam 103 (100); Al-Amin Hossain 3/47 (10 overs)		Salman Hossain 61* (75); Shuvagata Hom 5/47 (9.5 overs)

Abahani Limited won by 107 runs
Bangladesh Krira Shikkha Protisthan No 3 Ground, Savar
Umpires: Nadir Shah and Tanvir Ahmed
Player of the match: Shadman Islam (Abahani Limited)

- Abahani Limited won the toss and elected to bat.
- Shadman Islam (Abahani Limited) made his first century in a List A match.

5 May 2017
Scorecard

Prime Doleshwar Sporting Club; 228/8 (50 overs)	v	Mohammedan Sporting Club; 232/4 (47.4 overs)
Abdul Mazid 50 (73); Charith Asalanka 3/29 (10 overs)		Avishek Mitra 95 (134); Imtiaz Hossain 1/7 (2 overs)

Mohammedan Sporting Club won by 6 wickets
Khan Shaheb Osman Ali Stadium, Fatullah
Umpires: Anisur Rahman and Masudur Rahman
Player of the match: Avishek Mitra (Mohammedan Sporting Club)

- Mohammedan Sporting Club won the toss and elected to field.
- Khaled Ahmed (Prime Doleshwar Sporting Club) made his List A debut.

5 May 2017
Scorecard

Victoria Sporting Club; 155 (45.3 overs)	v	Legends of Rupganj; 156/4 (45.3 overs)
Uttam Sarkar 35 (45); Raza Ali Dar 3/13 (8.3 overs)		Pinak Ghosh 62 (110); Mohammad Arafat 1/16 (10 overs)

Legends of Rupganj won by 6 wickets
Bangladesh Krira Shikkha Protisthan No 4 Ground, Savar
Umpires: Moniruzzaman and Morshed Ali Khan
Player of the match: Pinak Ghosh (Legends of Rupganj)

- Victoria Sporting Club won the toss and elected to bat.

6 May 2017
Scorecard

Khelaghar; 266/8 (50 overs)	v	Sheikh Jamal; 246 (47.2 overs)
Robiul Islam Robi 103 (126); Abdur Razzak 5/52 (10 overs)		Rajin Saleh 76 (117); Tanvir Islam 4/41 (10 overs)

Khelaghar Samaj Kallyan Samity won by 20 runs
Bangladesh Krira Shikkha Protisthan No 4 Ground, Savar
Umpires: Morshed Ali Khan and Tanvir Ahmed
Player of the match: Robiul Islam Robi (Khelaghar Samaj Kallyan Samity)

- Khelaghar Samaj Kallyan Samity won the toss and elected to bat.

6 May 2017
Scorecard

Partex Sporting Club; 278/5 (50 overs)	v	Kalabagan Krira Chakra; 216 (46.1 overs)
Irfan Sukkur 58 (68); Nabil Samad 3/50 (10 overs)		Hamilton Masakadza 45 (55); Imran Ali 5/42 (7.1 overs)

Partex Sporting Club won by 62 runs
Khan Shaheb Osman Ali Stadium, Fatullah
Umpires: Akteruzzaman and Mahfuzur Rahman
Player of the match: Imran Ali (Partex Sporting Club)

- Kalabagan Krira Chakra won the toss and elected to field.
- Imran Ali (Partex Sporting Club) took his first five-wicket haul in a List A match.

6 May 2017
Scorecard

Gazi Group Cricketers; 236 (48.4 overs)	v	Brothers Union; 226 (48.5 overs)
Anamul Haque 93 (97); Saddam Hossain 3/34 (7 overs)		Manvinder Bisla 56 (95); Abu Hider 4/52 (9.5 overs)

Gazi Group Cricketers won by 10 runs
Bangladesh Krira Shikkha Protisthan No 3 Ground, Savar
Umpires: Anisur Rahman and Masudur Rahman
Player of the match: Anamul Haque (Gazi Group Cricketers)

- Brothers Union won the toss and elected to field.

8 May 2017
Scorecard

Abahani Limited; 366/5 (50 overs)	v	Mohammedan Sporting Club; 339/9 (50 overs)
Litton Das 135 (103); Taijul Islam 3/57 (10 overs)		Raqibul Hasan 190 (138); Manan Sharma 5/47 (10 overs)

Abahani Limited won by 27 runs
Bangladesh Krira Shikkha Protisthan No 4 Ground, Savar
Umpires: Anisur Rahman and Mahfuzur Rahman
Player of the match: Raqibul Hasan (Mohammedan Sporting Club)

- Abahani Limited won the toss and elected to bat.
- Ebadot Hossain (Mohammedan Sporting Club) made his List A debut.

8 May 2017
Scorecard

Prime Doleshwar Sporting Club; 339/6 (50 overs)	v	Victoria Sporting Club; 220 (45.5 overs)
Abdul Mazid 116 (184); Mohammad Arafat 2/48 (9 overs)		Shafiul Hayet 66 (65); Arafat Sunny 6/56 (9.5 overs)

Prime Doleshwar Sporting Club won by 119 runs
Bangladesh Krira Shikkha Protisthan No 3 Ground, Savar
Umpires: Akteruzzaman and Mozahiduzzaman
Player of the match: Abdul Mazid (Prime Doleshwar Sporting Club)

- Prime Doleshwar Sporting Club won the toss and elected to bat.
- Mahbubul Alam Anik (Victoria Sporting Club) made his List A debut.

8 May 2017
Scorecard

Legends of Rupganj; 239 (49.5 overs)	v	Khelaghar; 211 (48.1 overs)
Yasir Ali 59 (69); Tanvir Islam 3/54 (9 overs)		Nazimuddin 59 (86); Naeem Islam 2/16 (5 overs)

Legends of Rupganj won by 28 runs
Khan Shaheb Osman Ali Stadium, Fatullah
Umpires: Masudur Rahman and Morshed Ali Khan
Player of the match: Yasir Ali (Legends of Rupganj)

- Legends of Rupganj won the toss and elected to bat.

9 May 2017
Scorecard

Partex Sporting Club; 192 (46.2 overs)	v	Prime Bank Cricket Club; 114/0 (24 overs)
Jony Talukdar 69 (86); Nazmul Islam 3/23 (7 overs)		Zakir Hasan 55* (75)

Prime Bank Cricket Club won by 37 runs (D/L method)
Khan Shaheb Osman Ali Stadium, Fatullah
Umpires: Mahfuzur Rahman and Tanvir Ahmed

- Partex Sporting Club won the toss and elected to bat.

9 May 2017
Scorecard

Kalabagan Krira Chakra; 171 (42.2 overs)	v	Brothers Union; 82/1 (22.2 overs)
Mehrab Hossain 28 (49); Manvinder Bisla 3/23 (5.2 overs)		Junaid Siddique 38* (61); Abul Hasan 1/25 (7 overs)

Brothers Union won by 17 runs (D/L method)
Bangladesh Krira Shikkha Protisthan No 3 Ground, Savar
Umpires: Gazi Sohel and Moniruzzaman
Player of the match: Manvinder Bisla (Brothers Union)

- Kalabagan Krira Chakra won the toss and elected to bat.

9 May 2017
Scorecard

Sheikh Jamal; 232/9 (43 overs)	v	Gazi Group Cricketers; 114/2 (20.5 overs)
Tanbir Hayder 57 (54); Mahedi Hasan 2/36 (9 overs)		Jahurul Islam 49* (56); Tanbir Hayder 1/17 (3 overs)

Gazi Group Cricketers won by 24 runs (D/L method)
Bangladesh Krira Shikkha Protisthan No 4 Ground, Savar
Umpires: Anisur Rahman and Morshed Ali Khan
Player of the match: Jahurul Islam (Gazi Group Cricketers)

- Sheikh Jamal Dhanmondi Club won the toss and elected to bat.

11 May 2017
Scorecard

Partex Sporting Club; 229 (49.3 overs)	v	Mohammedan Sporting Club; 234 (48.2 overs)
Rakin Ahmed 46* (55); Kamrul Islam Rabbi 3/54 (6.3 overs)		Taijul Islam 57* (51); Imran Ali 2/36 (7.1 overs)

Mohammedan Sporting Club won by 2 wickets
Bangladesh Krira Shikkha Protisthan No 3 Ground, Savar
Umpires: Anisur Rahman and Gazi Sohel
Player of the match: Taijul Islam (Mohammedan Sporting Club)

- Partex Sporting Club won the toss and elected to bat.
- Rakin Ahmed (Partex Sporting Club) made his List A debut.

11 May 2017
Scorecard

Prime Doleshwar Sporting Club; 276 (49.5 overs)	v	Legends of Rupganj; 247/6 (50 overs)
Sharifullah 82 (73); Mosharraf Hossain 5/57 (10 overs)		Naeem Islam 78 (85); Sharifullah 3/32 (10 overs)

Prime Doleshwar Sporting Club won by 29 runs
Bangladesh Krira Shikkha Protisthan No 4 Ground, Savar
Umpires: Masudur Rahman and Nadir Shah
Player of the match: Sharifullah (Prime Doleshwar Sporting Club)

- Legends of Rupganj won the toss and elected to field.

11 May 2017
Scorecard

Victoria Sporting Club; 130 (42.4 overs)	v	Abahani Limited; 134/2 (20.5 overs)
Mohammad Arafat 47 (78); Manan Sharma 4/21 (6 overs)		Shadman Islam 58* (65); Mohammad Arafat 1/18 (5 overs)

Abahani Limited won by 8 wickets
Khan Shaheb Osman Ali Stadium, Fatullah
Umpires: Mahfuzur Rahman and Tanvir Ahmed
Player of the match: Manan Sharma (Abahani Limited)

- Victoria Sporting Club won the toss and elected to bat.
- Imran Sarker and Mujibor Rahman (Victoria Sporting Club) both made their List A debuts.

15 May 2017
Scorecard

Prime Bank Cricket Club; 249/6 (43 overs)	v	Brothers Union; 248/8 (43 overs)
Abhimanyu Easwaran 70 (68); Nihaduzzaman 3/49 (9 overs)		Manvinder Bisla 57 (47); Al-Amin Hossain 2/44 (7 overs)

Prime Bank Cricket Club won by 1 run
Bangladesh Krira Shikkha Protisthan No 3 Ground, Savar
Umpires: Gazi Sohel and Tanvir Ahmed
Player of the match: Abhimanyu Easwaran (Prime Bank Cricket Club)

- Prime Bank Cricket Club won the toss and elected to bat.

15 May 2017
Scorecard

Sheikh Jamal; 213/9 (45 overs)	v	Kalabagan Krira Chakra; 214/3 (43.3 overs)
Rajin Saleh 45 (71); Abul Hasan 3/50 (9 overs)		Mohammad Ashraful 81* (87); Mohammad Shakil 1/43 (9 overs)

Kalabagan Krira Chakra won by 7 wickets
Bangladesh Krira Shikkha Protisthan No 4 Ground, Savar
Umpires: Nadir Shah and Shafiuddin Ahmed
Player of the match: Mohammad Ashraful (Kalabagan Krira Chakra)

- Sheikh Jamal Dhanmondi Club won the toss and elected to bat.

15 May 2017
Scorecard

Khelaghar; 175/7 (43 overs)	v	Gazi Group Cricketers; 176/3 (36.1 overs)
Amit Majumder 49 (55); Abu Hider 4/35 (9 overs)		Anamul Haque 67 (77); Tanvir Islam 3/31 (8.1 overs)

Gazi Group Cricketers won by 7 wickets
Khan Shaheb Osman Ali Stadium, Fatullah
Umpires: Mahfuzur Rahman and Masudur Rahman
Player of the match: Abu Hider (Gazi Group Cricketers)

- Khelaghar Samaj Kallyan Samity won the toss and elected to bat.
- Moin Khan and Rafsan Al Mahmud (Khelaghar Samaj Kallyan Samity) both made their List A debuts.

17 May 2017
Scorecard

Abahani Limited; 333 (49.5 overs)	v	Legends of Rupganj; 284/6 (50 overs)
Litton Das 136 (101); Mosharraf Hossain 3/30 (5.5 overs)		Naeem Islam 123 (119); Abu Jayed 3/44 (8 overs)

Abahani Limited won by 49 runs
Bangladesh Krira Shikkha Protisthan No 4 Ground, Savar
Umpires: Anisur Rahman and Tanvir Ahmed
Player of the match: Litton Das (Abahani Limited)

- Abahani Limited won the toss and elected to bat.

17 May 2017
Scorecard

Khelaghar; 178 (45.3 overs)	v	Prime Doleshwar Sporting Club; 181/0 (33.1 overs)
Amit Majumder 73 (86); Arafat Sunny 3/14 (8 overs)		Imtiaz Hossain 107* (99)

Prime Doleshwar Sporting Club won by 10 wickets
Khan Shaheb Osman Ali Stadium, Fatullah
Umpires: Mahfuzur Rahman and Shafiuddin Ahmed
Player of the match: Imtiaz Hossain (Prime Doleshwar Sporting Club)

- Prime Doleshwar Sporting Club won the toss and elected to field.

17 May 2017
Scorecard

Partex Sporting Club; 302/9 (50 overs)	v	Victoria Sporting Club; 299/8 (49.3 overs)
Irfan Sukkur 95 (92); Mahbubul Alam 4/66 (9 overs)		Arun Karthik 89 (76); Imran Ali 4/55 (8.3 overs)

Victoria Sporting Club won by 2 wickets
Bangladesh Krira Shikkha Protisthan No 3 Ground, Savar
Umpires: Gazi Sohel and Masudur Rahman
Player of the match: Arun Karthik (Victoria Sporting Club)

- Partex Sporting Club won the toss and elected to bat.

18 May 2017
Scorecard

Prime Bank Cricket Club; 270/9 (50 overs)	v	Sheikh Jamal; 271/8 (49.5 overs)
Mehedi Maruf 61 (68); Shahadat Hossain 2/43 (8 overs)		Sohag Gazi 54 (62); Ariful Haque 4/75 (9.5 overs)

Sheikh Jamal Dhanmondi Club won by 2 wickets
Bangladesh Krira Shikkha Protisthan No 4 Ground, Savar
Umpires: Masudur Rahman and Moniruzzaman
Player of the match: Elias Sunny (Sheikh Jamal Dhanmondi Club)

- Sheikh Jamal Dhanmondi Club won the toss and elected to field.

18 May 2017
Scorecard

Kalabagan Krira Chakra; 222/9 (50 overs)	v	Gazi Group Cricketers; 95 (32.5 overs)
Tasamul Haque 102 (132); Parvez Rasool 4/44 (10 overs)		Nadif Chowdhury 45 (67); Sanjit Saha 3/7 (6.5 overs)

Kalabagan Krira Chakra won by 127 runs
Khan Shaheb Osman Ali Stadium, Fatullah
Umpires: Gazi Sohel and Mahfuzur Rahman
Player of the match: Tasamul Haque (Kalabagan Krira Chakra)

- Gazi Group Cricketers won the toss and elected to field.

18 May 2017
Scorecard

Brothers Union; 276/8 (49 overs)	v	Mohammedan Sporting Club; 147 (35.4 overs)
Junaid Siddique 110 (123); Taijul Islam 2/41 (8 overs)		Saikat Ali 70 (66); Iftekhar Sajjad 4/19 (5.4 overs)

Brothers Union won by 129 runs
Bangladesh Krira Shikkha Protisthan No 3 Ground, Savar
Umpires: Anisur Rahman and Tanvir Ahmed
Player of the match: Junaid Siddique (Brothers Union)

- Mohammedan Sporting Club won the toss and elected to field.
- Moinuddin Rubel (Brothers Union) made his List A debut.

20 May 2017
Scorecard

Abahani Limited; 246/7 (50 overs)	v	Prime Doleshwar Sporting Club; 247/6 (47.1 overs)
Afif Hossain 94 (106); Arafat Sunny 2/34 (8 overs)		Marshall Ayub 83 (94); Abu Jayed 3/64 (9 overs)

Prime Doleshwar Sporting Club won by 4 wickets
Bangladesh Krira Shikkha Protisthan No 3 Ground, Savar
Umpires: Imran Parvez and Mahfuzur Rahman
Player of the match: Marshall Ayub (Prime Doleshwar Sporting Club)

- Abahani Limited won the toss and elected to bat.

20 May 2017
Scorecard

Partex Sporting Club; 272/9 (50 overs)	v	Legends of Rupganj; 277/5 (49.2 overs)
Jatin Saxena 91 (50); Syed Rasel 4/38 (10 overs)		Raza Ali Dar 99 (99); Mamun Hossain 2/42 (9 overs)

Legends of Rupganj won by 5 wickets
Khan Shaheb Osman Ali Stadium, Fatullah
Umpires: Anisur Rahman and Tanvir Ahmed
Player of the match: Raza Ali Dar (Legends of Rupganj)

- Partex Sporting Club won the toss and elected to bat.

20 May 2017
Scorecard

Brothers Union; 235 (49.1 overs)	v	Victoria Sporting Club; 234/9 (50 overs)
Manvinder Bisla 78 (87); Monir Hossain 5/38 (9.1 overs)		Uttam Sarkar 49 (53); Manvinder Bisla 3/39 (10 overs)

Brothers Union won by 1 run
Bangladesh Krira Shikkha Protisthan No 4 Ground, Savar
Umpires: Moniruzzaman and Morshed Ali Khan
Player of the match: Manvinder Bisla (Brothers Union)

- Victoria Sporting Club won the toss and elected to field.

21 May 2017
Scorecard

Mohammedan Sporting Club; 339/5 (50 overs)	v	Sheikh Jamal; 343/9 (49.4 overs)
Shamsur Rahman 144* (152); Abdullah Al Mamun 2/31 (4 overs)		Sohag Gazi 89 (64); Mohammad Azim 4/70 (10 overs)

Sheikh Jamal Dhanmondi Club won by 1 wicket
Bangladesh Krira Shikkha Protisthan No 3 Ground, Savar
Umpires: Masudur Rahman and Shafiuddin Ahmed
Player of the match: Shamsur Rahman (Mohammedan Sporting Club)

- Sheikh Jamal Dhanmondi Club won the toss and elected to field.
- This was the highest-successful run-chase and the highest second-innings total in a List A match in Bangladesh.

21 May 2017
Scorecard

Gazi Group Cricketers; 214 (50 overs)	v	Prime Bank Cricket Club; 218/3 (46.5 overs)
Mominul Haque 79 (106); Nazmul Islam 3/45 (10 overs)		Zakir Hasan 66 (79); Hossain Ali 1/28 (5 overs)

Prime Bank Cricket Club won by 7 wickets
Khan Shaheb Osman Ali Stadium, Fatullah
Umpires: Mahfuzur Rahman and Nadir Shah
Player of the match: Zakir Hasan (Prime Bank Cricket Club)

- Prime Bank Cricket Club won the toss and elected to field.

21 May 2017
Scorecard

Khelaghar; 204/7 (50 overs)	v	Kala Bagan Krira Chakra; 205/5 (47.5 overs)
Arifurzaman Sagor 46 (58); Saad Nasim 3/34 (10 overs)		Jashimuddin 89 (105); Suraj Randiv 3/31 (9 overs)

Kalabagan Krira Chakra won by 5 wickets
Bangladesh Krira Shikkha Protisthan No 4 Ground, Savar
Umpires: Morshed Ali Khan and Sharfuddoula
Player of the match: Jashimuddin (Kalabagan Krira Chakra)

- Kalabagan Krira Chakra won the toss and elected to field.

=== Super League ===
24 May 2017
Scorecard

Abahani Limited; 321/6 (47 overs)	v	Prime Bank Cricket Club; 273 (43.3 overs)
Litton Das 85 (73); Al-Amin Hossain 2/43 (9 overs)		Zakir Hasan 55 (38); Manan Sharma 3/54 (9.3 overs)

Abahani Limited won by 60 runs (D/L method)
Bangladesh Krira Shikkha Protisthan No 4 Ground, Savar
Umpires: Mahfuzur Rahman and Nadir Shah
Player of the match: Litton Das (Abahani Limited)

- Prime Bank Cricket Club won the toss and elected to field.

24 May 2017
Scorecard

Mohammedan Sporting Club; 324/8 (50 overs)	v	Gazi Group Cricketers; 317/8 (50 overs)
Rony Talukdar 92 (95); Mohammad Shahzada 2/52 (8 overs)		Munim Shahriar 88 (83); Kamrul Islam Rabbi 2/59 (10 overs)

Mohammedan Sporting Club won by 7 runs
Khan Shaheb Osman Ali Stadium, Fatullah
Umpires: Anisur Rahman and Morshed Ali Khan
Player of the match: Rony Talukdar (Mohammedan Sporting Club)

- Gazi Group Cricketers won the toss and elected to field.

24 May 2017
Scorecard

Prime Doleshwar Sporting Club; 274/7 (46 overs)	v	Sheikh Jamal Dhanmondi Club; 251 (42.2 overs)
Imtiaz Hossain 128 (109); Tanbir Hayder 2/58 (10 overs)		Tanbir Hayder 46 (41); Chathuranga de Silva 2/38 (9 overs)

Prime Doleshwar Sporting Club won by 40 runs (D/L method)
Bangladesh Krira Shikkha Protisthan No 3 Ground, Savar
Umpires: Gazi Sohel and Masudur Rahman
Player of the match: Imtiaz Hossain (Prime Doleshwar Sporting Club)

- Sheikh Jamal Dhanmondi Club won the toss and elected to field.

27 May 2017
Scorecard

Mohammedan Sporting Club; 100 (33.4 overs)	v	Abahani Limited; 104/5 (15.3 overs)
Shamsur Rahman 23 (22); Manan Sharma 4/21 (6.4 overs)		Litton Das 50 (22); Shamsur Rahman 2/7 (2.3 overs)

Abahani Limited won by 5 wickets
Bangladesh Krira Shikkha Protisthan No 3 Ground, Savar
Umpires: Anisur Rahman and Nadir Shah
Player of the match: Saqlain Sajib (Abahani Limited)

- Mohammedan Sporting Club won the toss and elected to bat.

27 May 2017
Scorecard

Gazi Group Cricketers; 350/5 (50 overs)	v	Sheikh Jamal Dhanmondi Club; 173 (38.1 overs)
Nasir Hossain 134 (113); Ziaur Rahman 2/56 (9 overs)		Ziaur Rahman 46 (29); Abu Hider 6/35 (8 overs)

Gazi Group Cricketers won by 177 runs
Khan Shaheb Osman Ali Stadium, Fatullah
Umpires: Mahfuzur Rahman and Sharfuddoula
Player of the match: Nasir Hossain (Gazi Group Cricketers)

- Sheikh Jamal Dhanmondi Club won the toss and elected to field.

27 May 2017
Scorecard

Prime Bank Cricket Club; 241/8 (50 overs)	v	Prime Doleshwar Sporting Club; 242/4 (48.4 overs)
Abhimanyu Easwaran 71 (93); Rajat Bhatia 3/50 (10 overs)		Marshall Ayub 84 (89); Raihan Uddin 2/28 (10 overs)

Prime Doleshwar Sporting Club won by 6 wickets
Bangladesh Krira Shikkha Protisthan No 4 Ground, Savar
Umpires: Masudur Rahman and Morshed Ali Khan
Player of the match: Marshall Ayub (Prime Doleshwar Sporting Club)

- Prime Doleshwar Sporting Club won the toss and elected to field.
- Waliul Karim (Prime Doleshwar Sporting Club) made his List A debut.

30 May 2017
Scorecard

Sheikh Jamal Dhanmondi Club; 197 (45 overs)	v	Mohammedan Sporting Club; 201/5 (30.2 overs)
Ziaur Rahman 103 (85); Taijul Islam 3/49 (10 overs)		Shamsur Rahman 59 (58); Elias Sunny 2/48 (9 overs)

Mohammedan Sporting Club won by 5 wickets
Bangladesh Krira Shikkha Protisthan No 4 Ground, Savar
Umpires: Gazi Sohel and Morshed Ali Khan
Player of the match: Ziaur Rahman (Sheikh Jamal Dhanmondi Club)

- Sheikh Jamal Dhanmondi Club won the toss and elected to bat.

30 May 2017
Scorecard

Prime Doleshwar Sporting Club; 189/9 (50 overs)	v	Abahani Limited; 193/3 (36.3 overs)
Marshall Ayub 57 (83); Abu Jayed 3/42 (10 overs)		Shadman Islam 65 (78); Habibur Rahman 2/66 (9.3 overs)

Abahani Limited won by 7 wickets
Bangladesh Krira Shikkha Protisthan No 3 Ground, Savar
Umpires: Anisur Rahman and Nadir Shah
Player of the match: Saif Hassan (Abahani Limited)

- Abahani Limited won the toss and elected to field.

30–31 May 2017
Scorecard

Prime Bank Cricket Club; 173 (39.1 overs)	v	Gazi Group Cricketers; 177/5 (38.4 overs)
Shanaj Ahmed 54 (75); Gurkeerat Singh 3/27 (7.1 overs)		Nasir Hossain 61* (64); Nahidul Islam 2/29 (7 overs)

Gazi Group Cricketers won by 5 wickets
Khan Shaheb Osman Ali Stadium, Fatullah
Umpires: Masudur Rahman and Sharfuddoula
Player of the match: Nasir Hossain (Gazi Group Cricketers)

- Gazi Group Cricketers won the toss and elected to field.
- Only 4 balls were bowled before the match was stopped due to rain. The match continued on the next day.

2 June 2017
Scorecard

Abahani Limited; 156 (41.2 overs)	v	Gazi Group Cricketers; 157/4 (36.4 overs)
Afif Hossain 23 (31); Nasir Hossain 3/36 (8.2 overs)		Nasir Hossain 56* (92); Manan Sharma 2/40 (10 overs)

Gazi Group Cricketers won by 6 wickets
Bangladesh Krira Shikkha Protisthan No 3 Ground, Savar
Umpires: Anisur Rahman and Nadir Shah

- Gazi Group Cricketers won the toss and elected to field.

2 June 2017
Scorecard

Sheikh Jamal Dhanmondi Club; 242/7 (50 overs)	v	Prime Bank Cricket Club; 243/5 (48 overs)
Tanbir Hayder 58 (86); Al-Amin Hossain 3/46 (10 overs)		Mehedi Maruf 127 (143); Mehedi Hasan Rana 1/12 (2 overs)

Prime Bank Cricket Club won by 5 wickets
Bangladesh Krira Shikkha Protisthan No 4 Ground, Savar
Umpires: Akteruzzaman and Masudur Rahman
Player of the match: Mehedi Maruf (Prime Bank Cricket Club)

- Sheikh Jamal Dhanmondi Club won the toss and elected to bat.
- Arifur Rahman Rabin (Prime Bank Cricket Club) made his List A debut.

3 June 2017
Scorecard

Prime Doleshwar Sporting Club; 264/6 (50 overs)	v	Mohammedan Sporting Club; 167 (34.5 overs)
Shahriar Nafees 70 (103); Sajidul Islam 2/35 (7 overs)		Bipul Sharma 48 (47); Sharifullah 3/32 (7 overs)

Prime Doleshwar Sporting Club won by 97 runs
Khan Shaheb Osman Ali Stadium, Fatullah
Umpires: Gazi Sohel and Moniruzzaman
Player of the match: Shahriar Nafees (Prime Doleshwar Sporting Club)

- Mohammedan Sporting Club won the toss and elected to field.

5–6 June 2017
Scorecard

Mohammedan Sporting Club; 215 (49.4 overs)	v	Prime Bank Cricket Club; 216/4 (43.5 overs)
Nazmul Hossain Milon 53 (53); Al-Amin Hossain 4/35 (8.4 overs)		Rafatullah Mohmand 88 (129); Shamsur Rahman 1/11 (1 over)

Prime Bank Cricket Club won by 6 wickets
Khan Shaheb Osman Ali Stadium, Fatullah
Umpires: Masudur Rahman and Mozahiduzzaman
Player of the match: Rafatullah Mohmand (Prime Bank Cricket Club)

- Prime Bank Cricket Club won the toss and elected to field.
- The match continued on the next day due to rain.

5–6 June 2017
Scorecard

Gazi Group Cricketers; 222 (49.1 overs)	v	Prime Doleshwar Sporting Club; 224/4 (44.3 overs)
Jahurul Islam 87 (87); Farhad Reza 3/31 (8.1 overs)		Puneet Bisht 89* (91); Mominul Haque 1/16 (4 overs)

Prime Doleshwar Sporting Club won by 6 wickets
Bangladesh Krira Shikkha Protisthan No 3 Ground, Savar
Umpires: Anisur Rahman and Gazi Sohel
Player of the match: Puneet Bisht (Prime Doleshwar Sporting Club)

- Prime Doleshwar Sporting Club won the toss and elected to field.
- The match continued on the next day due to rain.

5 June 2017
Scorecard

Sheikh Jamal Dhanmondi Club; 162/7 (30.4 overs)	v	Abahani Limited; 124/4 (17.2 overs)
Mahbubul Karim 60 (59); Afif Hossain 5/32 (10 overs)		Saif Hassan 51 (40); Tanbir Hayder 2/14 (4 overs)

Abahani Limited won by 6 wickets (D/L method)
Bangladesh Krira Shikkha Protisthan No 4 Ground, Savar
Umpires: Akteruzzaman and Nadir Shah
Player of the match: Afif Hossain (Abahani Limited)

- Sheikh Jamal Dhanmondi Club won the toss and elected to bat.
- Moinul Hossain (Sheikh Jamal Dhanmondi Club) made his List A debut.
- Afif Hossain (Abahani Limited) took a hat-trick.

=== Relegation League ===
29 May 2017
Scorecard

Partex Sporting Club; 73 (25.1 overs)	v	Khelaghar Samaj Kallyan Samity; 77/2 (15.1 overs)
Irfan Sukkur 27 (24); Tanvir Islam 6/18 (9.1 overs)		Robiul Islam Robi 34 (38); Nuruzzaman Masum 1/8 (3 overs)

Khelaghar Samaj Kallyan Samity won by 8 wickets
Khan Shaheb Osman Ali Stadium, Fatullah
Umpires: Gazi Sohel and Masudur Rahman
Player of the match: Tanvir Islam (Khelaghar Samaj Kallyan Samity)

- Partex Sporting Club won the toss and elected to bat.

1–2 June 2017
Scorecard

Victoria Sporting Club; 120/1 (20 overs)	v	Partex Sporting Club; 88/4 (20 overs)
Nasiruddin Faruque 52* (59); Zakaria Masud 1/30 (4 overs)		Jony Talukdar 34 (47); Moinul Islam 2/18 (4 overs)

Victoria Sporting Club won by 32 runs
Khan Shaheb Osman Ali Stadium, Fatullah
Umpires: Mozahiduzzaman and Swakat Ali
Player of the match: Nasiruddin Faruque (Victoria Sporting Club)

- Partex Sporting Club won the toss and elected to field.
- Only 5 overs were bowled before the match was stopped due to rain. The match continued on the next day, with the match reduced to 20 overs per side.
- Imrul Karim, Jaynul Islam, Zarif Abdulla (Partex Sporting Club); Abdul Razzak Rajib, Sadmim Rahman and Shakinul Siraj (Victoria Sporting Club) all made their List A debuts.

8 June 2017
Scorecard

Victoria Sporting Club; 46 (18.2 overs)	v	Khelaghar Samaj Kallyan Samity; 47/2 (9.2 overs)
Rubel Mia 13 (17); Masum Khan 4/5 (3.2 overs)		Amit Majumder 33* (29); Monir Hossain 2/9 (4 overs)

Khelaghar Samaj Kallyan Samity won by 8 wickets
Khan Shaheb Osman Ali Stadium, Fatullah
Umpires: Abdullah Al Matin and Mohammad Wahid
Player of the match: Shaiful Islam (Khelaghar Samaj Kallyan Samity)

- Victoria Sporting Club won the toss and elected to bat.
- Shaiful Islam (Khelaghar Samaj Kallyan Samity), Mahmudul Hasan and Raafi Reza (Victoria Sporting Club) all made their List A debuts.
