= List of Dhaka Division cricketers =

This is presenting a complete list in alphabetical order of cricketers who have played for Dhaka Division in first-class, List A or Twenty20 matches since the team was formed ahead of the 1999–2000 season for the first National Cricket League (NCL) competition. Complying with other club lists, details are the player's name followed by his years active as a Dhaka player, current players to the end of the 2015–16 season.

Please to note that this list excludes players who appeared for the team in 1999–2000 only. This is because the NCL was not a first-class competition in its opening season. Some players (for example, MAHIAN RAHMAN) played for Dhaka that season and then played in first-class cricket for other teams in later seasons.

== A ==
- Abdul Mazid (2010–11 to 2015–16)
- Abu Taher (2000–01 to 2001–02)
- Abul Bashar (2011–12)
- Adil Ahmed (2004–05)
- Al-Hamim (2008–09)
- Ali Ahmed (2015–16)
- Al Sahariar (1999–2000 to 2007–08)
- Aminul Islam Bulbul (1994–95 to 2002–03)
- Anamul Haque (2008–09 to 2010–11)
- Anwar Hossain Monir (2002–03 to 2007–08)
- Anwar Hossain Piju (2002–03 to 2011–12)
- Arafat Sunny (2001–02 to 2009–10)
- Arman Hossain (2007–08 to 2010–11)
- Ashiqul Islam (2008–09)
- Ashraful Haque (2005–06 to 2008–09)
- Ashraful Khan (2003–04 to 2008–09)
- Asif Iqbal Babu (2010–11)

== B ==
- Biplab Sarkar (2000–01)

== D ==
- Dewan Sabbir (2013 to 2015–16)
- Didar Hossain (2013–14 to 2015–16)
- Dippajjal Day (2004–05 to 2006–07)

== E ==
- Elias Sunny (2003–04 to 2010–11)
- Emon Ahmed (2008–09 to 2010–11)

== F ==
- Fahim Muntasir (1999–2000 to 2004–05)
- Famim (2010- running )

== G ==
- Giashuddin (2011–12)

== H ==
- Halim Shah (2001–02 to 2004–05)
- Hannan Sarkar (2011–12)
- Harunur Rashid (1999–2000 to 2000–01)
- Humayun Kabir (2008–09)

== I ==
- Iftekhar Ahmed (2008–09)
- Imran Ahmed (1999–2000 to 2011–12)
- Imran Nazir (2009–10)

== J ==
- Jahangir Alam (1994–95 to 2004–05)
- Jahurul Islam (2009–10)
- Javed Omar (1994–95 to 2008–09)
- Jewel Hossain (2000–01 to 2004–05)
- Jony Talukdar (2014–15 to 2015–16)
- Joyraz Sheik (2015–16)
- Jubair Hossain (2014–15)

== K ==
- Thilina Kandamby (Sri Lanka; 2009–10)
- Khaled Mahmud (1999–2000 to 2005–06)

== L ==
- Lablur Rahman (2000–01 to 2003–04)

== M ==
- Mahbubul Alam (2003–04 to 2015–16)
- Mahbubur Rahman (2000–01)
- Mahfuzur Rahman (2003–04)
- Mahmudullah (2004–05 to 2012–13)
- Marshall Ayub (2006–07 to 2010–11)
- Masudur Rahman (2002–03 to 2004–05)
- Masum Khan (2013–14 to 2014–15)
- Mazharul Haque (2000–01 to 2003–04)
- Mehdi Hasan (2010–11)
- Mehrab Hossain senior (1994–95 to 2008–09)
- Mehrab Hossain junior (2004–05 to 2010–11)
- Jeevan Mendis (Sri Lanka; 2009–10)
- Mohammad Ashraful (2001–02 to 2010–11)
- Mohammad Azim (2006–07 to 2010–11)
- Mohammad Kamrul Islam (2005–06 to 2006–07)
- Mohammad Nazmul Islam (2009–10 to 2015–16)
- Mohammad Rafique (2001–02 to 2009–10)
- Mohammad Sento (2010–11)
- Mohammad Shahid (2011–12 to 2013)
- Mohammad Shahzada (2009–10)
- Mohammad Shakil (2006–07)
- Mohammad Sharif (2001–02 to 2015–16)
- Mohammad Sukran (2006–07)
- Mominul Haque (2008–09)
- Moniruzzaman (2003–04)
- Mosaddek Hossain senior (2000–01 to 2003–04)
- Mosaddek Hossain junior (2013–14)
- Mosharraf Hossain (2001–02 to 2015–16)
- Muklesur Rahman (2005–06)
- Myshukur Rahaman (2015–16)

== N ==
- Nabil Samad (2009–10)
- Nadif Chowdhury (2006–07 to 2015–16)
- Nadimuddin (2009–10)
- Naimur Rahman (1994–95 to 2003–04)
- Nasiruddin Faruque (2014–15 to 2015–16)
- Nazmul Hossain Milon (2006–07 to 2013)
- Nazmus Sadat (2004–05)
- Niamur Rashid (2001–02 to 2005–06)
- Niaz Morshed (2004–05 to 2008–09)
- Noor Hossain (2009–10 to 2013–14)
- Nurul Hasan (2011–12 to 2013–14)
- Nuruzzaman Masum (2015–16)

== P ==
- Prosenjit Das (2015–16)

== R ==
- Ranjan Das (1999–2000 to 2002–03)
- Raqibul Hasan (2011–12 to 2015–16)
- Rashedul Islam (2006–07)
- Rashidul Haque (2000–01 to 2008–09)
- Rezaul Islam (2005–06 to 2008–09)
- Rony Talukdar (2009–10 to 2015–16)
- Rumman Ahmed (2009–10)

== S ==
- Sadik Hasan (1999–00 to 2001–02)
- Saghir Hossain (2014–15 to 2015–16)
- Saif Hassan (2015–16)
- Saiful Islam (1999–2000 to 2003–04)
- Saikat Ali (2011–12 to 2013)
- Sajib Datta (2010–11)
- Sajjad Ahmed (2001–02 to 2005–06)
- Sajjad Kadir (2000–01 to 2007–08)
- Sanwar Hossain (1999–00 to 2005–06)
- Saqib Razzak (2003–04)
- Shahadat Hossain (2005–06 to 2014–15)
- Shahriar Hasan (2003–04 to 2006–07)
- Shahriar Hossain (1999–2000 to 2001–02)
- Shamsur Rahman (2006–07 to 2010–11)
- Sharifullah (2006–07 to 2010–11)
- Shuvagata Hom (2009–10 to 2015–16)
- Milinda Siriwardana (Sri Lanka; 2009–10)
- Sohel Hossain (2000–01 to 2001–02)

== T ==
- Taibur Rahman (2010–11 to 2014–15)
- Talha Jubair (2004–05 to 2010–11)
- Tapash Baisya (2009–10)

== U ==
- Uttam Sarkar (2003–04 to 2011–12)

== Z ==
- Zakir Hasan (2000–01)
