= List of Prime Bank Cricket Club cricketers =

Prime Bank Cricket Club, owned by Prime Bank Limited, plays List A and Twenty20 cricket in the Dhaka Premier Division in Bangladesh. It won the tournament in 2014–15. The club also participated in the 2013–14 Victory Day T20 Cup and was crowned the champions. Prime Bank Limited established its cricket club and associated cricket academy in 2012, when it bought the ownership rights of the Old DOHS Sports Club cricket team. When the Dhaka Premier Division resumed in 2013–14 after a one-season hiatus, with List A status for the first time, Prime Bank Cricket Club was one of the 12 competing teams. In 2014-15 Old DOHS returned to the Dhaka Premier Division as a separate team. Prime Bank won the first encounter between the two teams by 41 runs, and went on to win the championship.

In September 2013, Prime Bank Cricket Club first played List A cricket against the Brothers Union in the 2013–14 Dhaka Premier League, while they first played T20 cricket against the Mohammedan Sporting Club during the 2013–14 Victory Day T20 Cup. Prime Bank Cricket Club played 92 List A matches and 10 T20 matches in total. In total, 85 players have represented Prime Bank Cricket Club in at least one match across both formats. Taibur Rahman has made more appearances for the club than any other, who played in 64 matches for the club.

This is presenting a complete list in alphabetical order of cricketers who have played for Prime Bank Cricket Club in List A or Twenty20 matches, since the matches played by the team got official List A or Twenty20 status.

Last updated at the end of the 2019/20 season.

== A ==
- Abdur Rahman (2013–14)
- Abdur Razzak (2018–19)
- Al-Amin (2017 to 2018–19)
- Al-Amin Hossain (2017 to 2018–19)
- Alok Kapali (2013–14 to 2019–20)
- Anamul Haque (2013–14 to 2019–20)
- Mohammad Arafat (2021)
- Ariful Haque (2017 to 2018–19)
- Ariful Hasan (2013–14)
- Arifur Rahman (2017)
- Ashraful Alam (2014–15)
- Asif Ahmed (2017)

== B ==
- Ravi Bopara (England; 2013–14)

== C ==
- Unmukt Chand (India; 2015–16 to 2016–17)
- Kunal Chandela (India; 2017–18)
- Sudip Chatterjee (India; 2018–19)

== D ==
- Liam Dawson (England; 2013–14)
- Delwar Hossain (2017–18)
- Sameera de Zoysa (Sri Lanka; 2013–14)
- Dolar Mahmud (2013–14)

== E ==
- Abhimanyu Easwaran (India; 2016–17 to 2018–19)
- Emon Das (2013–14 to 2014–15)
- Enamul Haque (2013–14 to 2017–18)

== F ==
- Farhad Reza (2014–15)
- Mohammad Fariduddin (2013–14)

== G ==
- Golam Mabud (2013–14)

== I ==
- Imran Ali (2018–19)

== J ==
- Sanath Jayasuriya (2013–14 to 2015–16)
- Jony Talukdar (2015–16)

== K ==
- Thilina Kandamby (Sri Lanka; 2014–15)

== L ==
- Liton Das (2013–14)

== M ==
- Mahmudul Hasan (2013–14)
- Mahmudullah (2014–15)
- Mehdi Hasan (2015–16 to 2017–18)
- Mehrab Hossain Jnr. (2013–14 to 2017–18)
- Jeevan Mendis (Sri Lanka; 2013–14)
- Amit Majumder (2021)
- Mohammad Mithun (2019–20)
- Mohammad Azim (2015–16)
- Mohamamad Forkan (2014–15)
- Mohammad Saddam (2018–19)
- Mohammad Sharif (2013–14)
- Mohor Sheikh (2018–19)
- Monir Hossain (2015–16 to 2018–19)
- Dilshan Munaweera (Sri Lanka; 2014–15 to 2015–16)
- Mustafizur Rahman (2019–20)

== N ==
- Nahidul Islam (2016–17 to 2019–20)
- Nayeem Hasan (2018–19 to 2019–20)
- Nazmul Hossain Milon (2018–19)
- Nazmul Islam (2015–16 to 2016–17)
- Nurul Hasan (2014–15 to 2015–16)

== O ==
- Naman Ojha (India; 2018–19)

== P ==
- Yusuf Pathan (India; 2017–18)

== R ==
- Rafatullah Mohmand (Pakistan; 2016–17)
- Raihan Uddin (2015–16 to 2016–17)
- Bhanuka Rajapaksa (Sri Lanka; 2013–14)
- Suresh Raina (India; 2015–16)
- Rakibul Hasan (2021)
- Raqibul Hasan (2019–20)
- Rejaul Karim (2013–14)
- Robiul Islam (2013–14)
- Rony Talukdar (2019–20)
- Rubel Hossain (2013–14 to 2019–20)
- Rubel Mia (2018–19)
- Rumman Ahmed (2013–14)

== S ==
- Sabbir Rahman (2013–14 to 2016–17)
- Saikat Ali (2013–14 to 2014–15)
- Sajjadul Haque (2017–18)
- Salman Hossain (2016–17 to 2018–19)
- Shadman Islam (2014–15)
- Shahadat Hossain (2013–14)
- Shakib Al Hasan (2013–14)
- Shanaj Ahmed (2015–16 to 2017–18)
- Shoriful Islam (2017–18 to 2019–20)
- Shuvagata Hom (2014–15 to 2015–16)
- Sohag Gazi (2013–14)
- Soumya Sarkar (2014–15 to 2016–17)

== T ==
- Taibur Rahman (2013–14 to 2016–17)
- Taijul Islam (2013–14 to 2014–15)
- Tamim Iqbal (2019–20)
- Tanbir Hayder (2013–14)
- Tapash Baisya (2013–14 to 2014–15)
- Taskin Ahmed (2014–15)
- Brendan Taylor (Zimbabwe; 2013–14 to 2014–15)
- Lahiru Thirimanne (Sri Lanka; 2013–14)

== Y ==
- Yasir Ali (2015–16)

== Z ==
- Zakir Hasan (2016–17 to 2018–19)
- Ziaur Rahman (2013–14)
