= List of Khulna Division cricketers =

This is presenting a complete list in alphabetical order of cricketers who have played for Khulna Division in first-class, List A or Twenty20 matches since the team was formed ahead of the 1999–2000 season for the first National Cricket League (NCL) competition. Complying with other club lists, details are the player's name followed by his years active as a Khulna player, current players to the end of the 2015–16 season.

Please to note that this list excludes players who appeared for the team in 1999–2000 only. This is because the NCL was not a first-class competition in its opening season. Some players (for example, MAHIAN RAHMAN ) played for Khulna that season and then played in first-class cricket for other teams in later seasons.

== A ==
- Abdul Halim (2015–16)
- Abdur Razzak (2001–02 to 2015–16)
- Abu Bakkar (2014–15 to 2015–16)
- Abu Khaled (2002–03)
- Ahmed Kamal (1999–2000 to 2001–02)
- Al-Amin Hossain (2011–12 to 2015–16)
- Alauddin Babu (2009–10)
- Amit Majumder (2008–09 to 2015–16)
- Anamul Haque (2011–12 to 2015–16)
- Asadullah Khan (1999–2000 to 2007–08)
- Ashiqur Zaman (2022–23 to present)
- Ashraful Aziz (2008–09)
- Ashraful Haque (2003–04 to 2011–12)
- Aslam Ali Khan (2005–06 to 2010–11)
- Aslam Khan (2005–06 to 2008–09)
- Atiqur Rahman (2008–09)

== B ==
- Ryan Bailey (South Africa; 2009–10)
- Bijon Bhattacharya (2001–02)
- Bishawnath Halder (2008–09 to 2011–12)

== C ==
- Sanjay Chakrabarty (2003–04 to 2007–08)

== D ==
- Dolar Mahmud (2004–05 to 2014–15)

== E ==
- Elias Sunny (2009–10)
- Enamul Haque (2015–16)

== F ==
- Fahim Muntasir (2006–07)
- Faizul Islam (2003–04 to 2005–06)
- Farhad Hossain (2009–10)
- Fariduddin (2006–07 to 2011–12)

== G ==
- Giashuddin (2008–09)

== H ==
- Habibul Bashar (2003–04 to 2009–10)
- Habibur Rahman (2008–09 to 2009–10)
- Hasanuzzaman (1999–2000 to 2005–06)
- Hasibul Haque (2003–04)
- Humayun Kabir (2005–06 to 2006–07)

- Imran Hossain (2013)
- Imrul Kayes (2006–07 to 2015–16)
- Imtiaz Hossain (2009–10)

== J ==
- Jalaluddin (2003–04)
- Jamaluddin Ahmed (1999–2000 to 2007–08)
- Jobaydur Rahman (2010–11 to 2013)
- Jupiter Ghosh (2010–11 to 2015–16)

== K ==
- Kazi Hasibul Haque (2003–04)
- Khairuzzaman (1999–2000 to 2000–01)

== M ==
- Mahmudul Haque (2015–16)
- Mahmuduzzaman (2006–07 to 2008–09)
- Manjural Islam Monju (1999–2000 to 2007–08)
- Manjural Islam Rana (2000–01 to 2006–07)
- Mashrafe Mortaza (2002–03 to 2013–14)
- Mashud Ahmed (2001–02)
- Masudul Hasan (1999–2000 to 2002–03)
- Mehedi Hasan (born 1994) (2014–15 to 2015–16)
- Mehedi Hasan (born 1997) (2014–15 to 2015–16)
- Mohammad Al-Amin (2000–01 to 2005–06)
- Mithun Ali (2009–10 to 2015–16)
- Mohammad Mazhar (2006–07)
- Mohammad Rahi (2013)
- Mohammad Salim (1999–2000 to 2013–14)
- Mohammad Shakil (2008–09)
- Mohammad Sharif (2009–10)
- Monirul Islam Taj (1999–2000 to 2008–09)
- Monowar Hossain (2009–10 to 2011–12)
- Mosaddek Iftekhar (2008–09 to 2012–13)
- Mostafizur Rahman (2007–08 to 2010–11)
- Murad Khan (2006–07 to 2015–16)
- Mustafizur Rahman (2013–14 to 2015–16)
- MD. Mizanur rahman Manik (1999–2006)
- Mahian rahman Famim (2015-continued)

== N ==
- Nahidul Haque (2000–01 to 2008–09)
- Nahidul Islam (2013–14)
- Nazmus Sadat (2004–05 to 2013–14)
- Niaz Morshed (1999–2000 to 2004–05)
- Nizamuddin (2003–04 to 2013–14)
- Nurul Hasan (2009–10 to 2015–16)
- Nuruzzaman (1999–2000 to 2003–04)

== P ==
- Alviro Petersen (South Africa; 2009–10)

== R ==
- Raihan Anas (2008–09)
- Raihanuddin Arafat (2013)
- Rajibul Islam (2013–14)
- Raju Parvez (2000–01 to 2003–04)
- Rasheduzzaman (2000–01)
- Raziul Ahsan (2003–04)
- Rezwan Kabir (2004–05 to 2009–10)
- Riazul Karim (2009–10)
- Robiul Islam Robi (2008–09 to 2014–15)
- Robiul Islam Shiplu (2005–06 to 2015–16)
- Rubel Hossain (2010–11 to 2012–13)

== S ==
- Sadik Khan (2005–06 to 2006–07)
- Saghir Hossain (2004–05 to 2011–12)
- Sajjadul Hasan (1999–2000 to 2006–07)
- Shafiul Alam (2000–01 to 2006–07)
- Shahin Ahmed (1999–2000 to 2001–02)
- Shahriar Alam (2003–04)
- Shahriar Habib (2003–04)
- Shahriar Kabir (2001–02)
- Shakib Al Hasan (2004–05 to 2015–16)
- Shamsur Rahman (2005–06)
- Sheikh Salahuddin (1999–2000 to 2006–07)
- Sohel Islam (1999–2000 to 2001–02)
- Soumya Sarkar (2010–11 to 2015–16)
- Syed Rasel (2001–02 to 2014–15)

== T ==
- Taibur Rahman (2008–09)
- Tamim Bashir (2001–02 to 2003–04)
- Taposh Ghosh (2009–10 to 2013–14)
- Tareq Aziz (2009–10)
- Tarequzzaman (2008–09)
- Tarikul Hasan (1999–2000 to 2001–02)
- Tushar Imran (2000–01 to 2015–16)

== U ==
- Mahela Udawatte (Sri Lanka; 2009–10)

== Z ==
- Zakir Hossain (2004–05)
- Ziaur Rahman (2004–05 to 2015–16)
- Nuwan Zoysa (Sri Lanka; 2009–10)
