= List of Sylhet Super Stars cricketers =

This is presenting a complete list in alphabetical order of cricketers who have played for Sylhet Super Stars in Twenty20 matches held by the Bangladesh Premier League. The Sylhet Super Stars franchise was formed ahead of the 2015 BPL edition, replacing the former Sylhet Royals team which participated in the 2012 and 2013 BPL editions. The list includes all players who represented the Royals. Complying with other club lists, details are the player's name followed by his years active as a Sylhet Royals/Super Stars player, current players to the end of the 2015–16 Bangladeshi cricket season.

== A ==
- Abdur Razzak (2015–16)
- Abul Hasan (2011–12)
- Alok Kapali (2011–12)

== B ==
- Sulieman Benn (West Indies; 2012–13)
- Bishawnath Halder (2012–13)
- Ravi Bopara (England; 2015–16)

== C ==
- Shivnarine Chanderpaul (West Indies; 2012–13)
- Elton Chigumbura (Zimbabwe; 2012–13)
- Josh Cobb (England; 2015–16)

== E ==
- Fidel Edwards (West Indies; 2015–16)

== F ==
- Faisal Iqbal (Pakistan; 2011–12)

== H ==
- Hammad Azam (Pakistan; 2015–16)
- Brad Hogg (Australia; 2011–12)

== I ==
- Imrul Kayes (2011–12)
- Imtiaz Hossain (2012–13)

== J ==
- Jashimuddin (2012–13)
- Shehan Jayasuriya (Sri Lanka; 2015–16)
- Junaid Siddique (2015–16)

== K ==
- Kamran Akmal (Pakistan; 2011–12)
- Gary Keedy (England; 2011–12)

== M ==
- Hamilton Masakadza (Zimbabwe; 2012–13)
- Tom Maynard (England; 2011–12)
- Ajantha Mendis (Sri Lanka; 2015–16)
- Mohammad Nabi (Afghanistan; 2012–13)
- Mohammad Nazmul Hossain (2012–13)
- Mohammed Nazmul Islam (2015–16)
- Mohammad Shahid (2015–16)
- Mominul Haque (2012–13 to 2015–16)
- Dilshan Munaweera (Sri Lanka; 2015–16)
- Mushfiqur Rahim (2012–13 to 2015–16)

== N ==
- Nabil Samad (2011–12)
- Nadif Chowdhury (2011–12 to 2012–13)
- Naeem Islam senior (2011–12)
- Dirk Nannes (Australia; 2012–13)
- Nasum Ahmed (2015–16)
- Nazmul Hossain Milon (2012–13 to 2015–16)
- Noor Hossain (2011–12)
- Nurul Hasan (2015–16)

== O ==
- Owais Shah (England; 2015–16)

== R ==
- Raza Ali Dar (Pakistan; 2011–12)
- Rubel Hossain (2011–12 to 2015–16)

== S ==
- Sajidul Islam (2012–13)
- Shahid Afridi (Pakistan; 2015–16)
- Shuvagata Hom (2011–12)
- Dwayne Smith (West Indies; 2012–13)
- Sohag Gazi (2012–13)
- Sohail Tanvir (Pakistan; 2011–12 to 2015–16)
- Paul Stirling (Ireland; 2012–13)
- Scott Styris (New Zealand; 2011–12)
- Subashis Roy (2015–16)
- Suhrawadi Shuvo (2012–13)

== T ==
- Talha Jubair (2011–12)
- Peter Trego (England; 2011–12)
