= List of Barisal Bulls cricketers =

This is presenting a complete list in alphabetical order of cricketers who have played for Barisal Bulls in Twenty20 matches held by the Bangladesh Premier League. The Barisal Bulls franchise was formed ahead of the 2015 BPL edition, replacing the former Barisal Burners team which participated in the 2012 and 2013 BPL editions. The list includes all players who represented the Burners. Complying with other club lists, details are the player's name followed by his years active as a Barisal Burners/Bulls player, current players to the end of the 2015–16 Bangladeshi cricket season.

== A ==
- Ahmed Shehzad (Pakistan; 2011/12)
- Al-Amin Hossain (2011/12 to 2015/16)
- Alauddin Babu (2011/12 to 2012/13)
- Alok Kapali (2012/13)
- Azhar Mahmood (England; 2012/13)
- Al Amin Shehzad ( 2012/13)

== C ==
- Kevon Cooper (West Indies; 2015/16)

== D ==
- Joe Denly (England; 2012/13)
- Nikhil Dutta (Canada; 2015/16)

== E ==
- Elias Sunny (2012/13)

== F ==
- Farhad Hossain (2011/12)

== G ==
- Chris Gayle (West Indies; 2011/12 to 2015/16)

== H ==
- Shane Harwood (Australia; 2011/12)
- Hameed Hassan (Afghanistan; 2012/13)
- Brad Hodge (Australia; 2011/12 to 2012/13)

== J ==
- Jubair Ahmed (2012/13)

== K ==
- Kabir Ali (England; 2011/12 to 2012/13)

== L ==
- Evin Lewis (West Indies; 2015/16)

== M ==
- Farveez Maharoof (Sri Lanka; 2012/13)
- Mahmudul Hasan (2012/13)
- Mahmudullah (2015/16)
- Mehdi Hasan (2015/16)
- Mithun Ali (2011/12)
- Mohammed Nazmul Islam (2011/12 to 2012/13)
- Mohammad Sami (Pakistan; 2015/16)
- Mominul Haque (2011/12)
- Phil Mustard (England; 2011/12 to 2012/13)

== N ==
- Nadif Chowdhury (2015/16)

== P ==
- Seekkuge Prasanna (Sri Lanka; 2015/16)

== R ==
- Rayad Emrit (West Indies; 2015/16)
- Rameez Raja (Pakistan; 2011/12)
- Rony Talukdar (2015/16)

== S ==
- Sabbir Rahman (2012/13 to 2015/16)
- Sajidul Islam (2015/16 to 2012/13)
- Shahriar Nafees (2011/12 to 2015/16)
- Shuvagata Hom (2012/13)
- Sohag Gazi (2011/12 to 2015/16)
- Suhrawadi Shuvo (2011/12 to 2015/16)

== T ==
- Taijul Islam (2015/16)
- Brendan Taylor (Zimbabwe; 2015/16)

== Y ==
- Yasir Arafat (Pakistan; 2011/12)
