= Moin Khan (Bangladeshi cricketer) =

Bangladeshi cricketer (born 1995)

Personal information
- Full name: Moin Khan
- Born: 24 October 1995 (age 31)

Domestic team information
- Years: Team
- 2016-present: Barisal Division
- 2017-present: Khelaghar Samaj Kallyan Samity
- Source: ESPNcricinfo, 30 December 2016

Moin Khan (born 24 October 1995) is a Bangladeshi cricketer. He made his first-class debut for Barisal Division in the 2016–17 National Cricket League on 27 December 2016. He made his List A debut for Khelaghar Samaj Kallyan Samity in the 2016–17 Dhaka Premier Division Cricket League on 15 May 2017. He made his Twenty20 debut on 31 May 2021, for Partex Sporting Club in the 2021 Dhaka Premier Division Twenty20 Cricket League.
