= Shafiul Hayet =

Bangladeshi cricketer (born 1997)

Personal information
- Born: 21 November 1997 (age 28); Dhaka, Bangladesh
- Source: Cricinfo, 13 April 2017

Shafiul Hayet (born 21 November 1997) is a Bangladeshi cricketer. He made his List A debut for Victoria Sporting Club in the 2016–17 Dhaka Premier Division Cricket League on 13 April 2017. Prior to his List A debut, he was part of Bangladesh's squad for the 2016 Under-19 Cricket World Cup. He made his first-class debut for Dhaka Division in the 2019–20 National Cricket League on 16 November 2019. He made his Twenty20 debut on 31 May 2021, for Partex Sporting Club in the 2021 Dhaka Premier Division Twenty20 Cricket League.
