= Raafi Reza =

Bangladeshi cricketer (born 1999)

Personal information
- Born: 15 April 1999 (age 27)
- Source: Cricinfo, 8 June 2017

Raafi Reza (born 15 April 1999) is a Bangladeshi cricketer. He made his List A debut for Victoria Sporting Club in the 2016–17 Dhaka Premier Division Cricket League on 8 June 2017.
