= Hafiz Al-Hasan =

Bangladeshi cricketer

Personal information
- Full name: Hafiz Al-Hasan
- Source: ESPNcricinfo, 12 April 2017

Hafiz Al-Hasan is a Bangladeshi cricketer. He made his List A debut for Partex Sporting Club in the 2016–17 Dhaka Premier Division Cricket League on 12 April 2017.
