= Milon Kumar =

Bangladeshi cricketer

Personal information
- Full name: Milon Kumar Sahananto
- Source: Cricinfo, 2 May 2017

Milon Kumar is a Bangladeshi cricketer. He made his List A debut for Khelaghar Samaj Kallyan Samity in the 2016–17 Dhaka Premier Division Cricket League on 30 April 2017.
