= Mahmudul Hasan (cricketer, born 1994) =

Bangladeshi cricketer (born 1994)

Personal information
- Born: 22 October 1994 (age 32); Rangpur, Bangladesh
- Batting: Right-handed
- Bowling: Slow left arm orthodox
- Role: All-rounder

Domestic team information
- Years: Team
- 2015–2017: Victoria Sporting Club (squad no. 13)
- 2017–2018: Sheikh Jamal Dhanmondi Club Limited (squad no. 13)
- Source: ESPNcricinfo, 8 June 2017

Mahmudul Hasan (born 22 October 1994) is a Bangladeshi cricketer. He made his List A debut for Victoria Sporting Club in the 2016–17 Dhaka Premier Division Cricket League on 8 June 2017.
