= Shaiful Islam =

Bangladeshi cricketer (born 1983)

Personal information
- Born: 2 January 1983 (age 43)
- Source: ESPNcricinfo, 8 June 2017

Shaiful Islam (born 2 January 1983) is a Bangladeshi cricketer. He made his List A debut for Khelaghar Samaj Kallyan Samity in the 2016–17 Dhaka Premier Division Cricket League on 8 June 2017.
