= Arifurzaman Sagor =

Bangladeshi cricketer

Personal information
- Full name: Arifurzaman Sagor
- Source: Cricinfo, 20 April 2017

Arifurzaman Sagor is a Bangladeshi cricketer. He made his List A debut for Khelaghar Samaj Kallyan Samity in the 2016–17 Dhaka Premier Division Cricket League on 18 April 2017.
