= Mamun Hossain =

Bangladeshi cricketer

Personal information
- Full name: Mamun Hossain
- Source: ESPNcricinfo, 4 January 2017

Mamun Hossain is a Bangladeshi cricketer. Primarily a bowler, he made his first-class debut for North Zone in the 2015–16 Bangladesh Cricket League on 7 March 2016. He made his List A debut for Partex Sporting Club in the 2016–17 Dhaka Premier Division Cricket League on 17 April 2017.
