= Mujibor Rahman =

Bangladeshi cricketer

Personal information
- Full name: Mujibor Rahman
- Source: ESPNcricinfo, 11 May 2017

Mujibor Rahman is a Bangladeshi cricketer. He made his List A debut for Victoria Sporting Club in the 2016–17 Dhaka Premier Division Cricket League on 11 May 2017.
