= Moinuddin Rubel =

Bangladeshi cricketer (born 1988)

Personal information
- Full name: Moinuddin Rubel
- Born: 12 August 1988 (age 38)
- Batting: Right-handed
- Bowling: Right-arm medium-fast

Domestic team information
- Years: Team
- Bondor
- Source: ESPNcricinfo, 4 December 2020

Moinuddin Rubel (born 12 August 1988) is a Bangladeshi cricketer. He made his first-class debut for Chittagong Division in the 2013–14 National Cricket League on 6 February 2014. He made his List A debut for Brothers Union in the 2016–17 Dhaka Premier Division Cricket League on 18 May 2017.
