= Zarif (given name) =

Zarif is an Arabic masculine given name, meaning "elegant". The feminine equivalent is Zarifa. Notable people with the given name include:

== Given name ==
- Zarif (singer), English singer-songwriter
- Zarif Abdulla, Bangladeshi cricketer
- Zarif Baiguskarov (born 1967), Russian political figure
- Zarif Irfan Hashimuddin (born 1995), Malaysian footballer
- Zarif Khan (1887–1964), Pakistani-American restaurant owner and investor
- Zarif Sharifzoda (1970–2017), Tajik general
- Zarifou Ayéva (1942–2025), Togolese politician
