= Merajul Hoque =

Bangladeshi cricketer (born 1986)

Personal information
- Born: 14 December 1986 (age 39)
- Source: ESPNcricinfo, 12 April 2017

Merajul Hoque (born 14 December 1986) is a Bangladeshi cricketer. He made his List A debut for Brothers Union in the 2016–17 Dhaka Premier Division Cricket League on 12 April 2017.
