= Imran Ali (cricketer, born 1994) =

Bangladeshi cricketer (born 1994)

Personal information
- Full name: Imran Ali
- Born: 3 January 1994 (age 32); Sylhet, Bangladesh
- Source: Cricinfo, 2 May 2017

Imran Ali (born 3 January 1994) is a Bangladeshi cricketer. He made his first-class debut for Sylhet Division in the 2013–14 National Cricket League on 13 February 2014. He made his List A debut for Partex Sporting Club in the 2016–17 Dhaka Premier Division Cricket League on 30 April 2017. Six days later in his second List A match, he took a five-wicket haul. He made his Twenty20 debut on 31 May 2021, for Partex Sporting Club in the 2021 Dhaka Premier Division Twenty20 Cricket League.

== See also ==
- List of Prime Bank Cricket Club cricketers
