= Mehdi Mahbub =

Bangladeshi cricketer

Personal information
- Full name: Mehdi Mahbub
- Source: Cricinfo, 13 April 2017

Mehdi Mahbub is a Bangladeshi cricketer. He made his List A debut for Victoria Sporting Club in the 2016–17 Dhaka Premier Division Cricket League on 13 April 2017.
