= Sadmim Rahman =

Bangladeshi cricketer (born 1999)

Personal information
- Born: 21 August 1999 (age 27)
- Source: Cricinfo, 2 June 2017

Sadmim Rahman (born 21 August 1999) is a Bangladeshi cricketer. He made his List A debut for Victoria Sporting Club in the 2016–17 Dhaka Premier Division Cricket League on 1 June 2017.
