= Robiul Islam Robi =

Bangladeshi cricketer (born 1990)

Personal information
- Born: 15 October 1990 (age 36); Rajshahi, Bangladesh

Domestic team information
- Years: Team
- 2008-present: Khulna Division
- 2014-2015: Partex SC
- 2015-2016: Prime Doleshwar SC
- 2016-2019: Khelaghar Samaj Kallyan Samity
- 2019-2021: Shinepukur Cricket Club
- 2021-present: Sheikh Jamal Dhanmondi Club
- Source: Cricinfo, 4 June 2022

Robiul Islam Robi (born 15 October 1990) is a Bangladeshi first-class cricketer who plays for Khulna Division. In May 2017, he scored his first century in a List A match, playing for Khelaghar Samaj Kallyan Samity in the 2016–17 Dhaka Premier Division Cricket League. He made his Twenty20 debut for Khelaghar Samaj Kallyan Samity in the 2018–19 Dhaka Premier Division Twenty20 Cricket League on 25 February 2019.

== See also ==
- List of Khulna Division cricketers
