= Zarifa =

Zarifa is a given name and surname of Arabic origin. Notable people with the name include:

== Given Name ==
- Zarifa Aliyeva (1924–1985), Azerbaijani ophthalmologist
- Zarifa Ghafari (born 1994), Afghan activist
- Zarifa Pashaevna Mgoyan, the birth name of Russian pop singer Zara (born 1983)
- Zarifa Sautieva (born 1978), Russian museum director and political activist

== Surname ==
- David Zarifa, Canadian academic

== See also ==
- Zarif (given name), masculine form of the name Zarifa
