= Shakinul Siraj =

Bangladeshi cricketer

Personal information
- Full name: Shakinul Siraj
- Source: ESPNcricinfo, 2 June 2017

Shakinul Siraj is a Bangladeshi cricketer. He made his List A debut for Victoria Sporting Club in the 2016–17 Dhaka Premier Division Cricket League on 1 June 2017.
