= Imran Sarker =

Bangladeshi cricketer

Personal information
- Full name: Imran Sarker
- Source: Cricinfo, 11 May 2017

Imran Sarker is a Bangladeshi cricketer. He made his List A debut for Victoria Sporting Club in the 2016–17 Dhaka Premier Division Cricket League on 11 May 2017.
