= Golam Mabud =

Bangladeshi cricketer (born 1984)

Personal information
- Full name: Golam Mabud Chowdhury
- Born: 10 October 1984 (age 42)
- Source: Cricinfo, 16 May 2021

Golam Mabud (born 10 October 1984) is a Bangladeshi cricketer. He played in 79 first-class and 55 List A matches from 2001/02 to 2012/13. He was also part of the Dhaka Warriors' squad for the Indian Cricket League (ICL). After initially facing a ten-year ban by the Bangladesh Cricket Board (BCB) for joining the ICL, Mabud was one of thirteen players to end their relationship with the ICL in June 2009.

== See also ==
- List of Prime Bank Cricket Club cricketers
- List of Sylhet Division cricketers
