= Waliul Karim =

Bangladeshi cricketer (born 1992)

Personal information
- Born: 18 December 1992 (age 33)
- Source: ESPNcricinfo, 27 May 2017

Waliul Karim (born 18 December 1992) is a Bangladeshi cricketer. He made his List A debut for Prime Doleshwar Sporting Club in the 2016–17 Dhaka Premier Division Cricket League on 27 May 2017. He made his Twenty20 debut for Gazi Group Cricketers in the 2018–19 Dhaka Premier Division Twenty20 Cricket League on 26 February 2019.
