= Hossain Ali =

Bangladeshi cricketer (born 1998)

Personal information
- Born: 10 September 1998 (age 28); Narsingdi, Bangladesh
- Batting: Right-handed
- Bowling: Right-arm medium
- Source: Cricinfo, 13 August 2021

Hossain Ali (born 10 September 1998) is a Bangladeshi cricketer. He made his first-class debut for Chittagong Division in the 2016–17 National Cricket League on 25 September 2016. He made his List A debut for Gazi Group Cricketers in the 2016–17 Dhaka Premier Division Cricket League on 29 April 2017. He made his Twenty20 debut for Rajshahi Kings on 7 November 2017 in the 2017–18 Bangladesh Premier League.
