= Zarif Abdulla =

Bangladeshi cricketer

Zarif Abdullah
Personal information
- Full name: Zarif Abdullah
- Source: Cricinfo, 2 June 2017

Zarif Abdullah is a Bangladeshi cricketer. He made his List A debut for Partex Sporting Club in the 2016–17 Dhaka Premier Division Cricket League on 1 June 2017.
