= Moinul Hossain =

Bangladeshi cricketer

- Source: ESPNcricinfo, 5 June 2017

Moinul Hossain is a Bangladeshi cricketer. He made his List A debut for Sheikh Jamal Dhanmondi Club in the 2016–17 Dhaka Premier Division Cricket League on 5 June 2017.
