= Shamsul Alam (cricketer) =

Bangladeshi cricketer

Personal information
- Full name: Shamsul Alam
- Source: ESPNcricinfo, 20 April 2017

Shamsul Alam is a Bangladeshi cricketer. He made his List A debut for Abahani Limited in the 2013–14 Dhaka Premier Division Cricket League on 30 September 2013. On 7 November 2013, in the match against Brothers Union, he took a five-wicket haul and was named the player of the match.
