= Sujon Hawlader =

Bangladeshi cricketer (born 1995)

Personal information
- Born: 23 June 1995 (age 31)
- Batting: Right-handed

Career statistics
Competition	First-class	List A
Matches	10	14
Runs scored	59	25
Batting average	6.55	5.00
100s/50s	0/0	0/0
Top score	27	22
Balls bowled	1132	671
Wickets	17	11
Bowling average	32.58	60.09
5 wickets in innings	0	0
10 wickets in match	0	0
Best bowling	4/83	2/28
Catches/stumpings	4/–	5/–
- Source: ESPNcricinfo, 11 August 2021

Sujon Hawlader (born 23 June 1995) is a Bangladeshi first-class cricketer who plays for Rajshahi Division. He made his List A debut for Abahani Limited against Gazi Group Cricketers in the 2016–17 Dhaka Premier Division Cricket League on 29 April 2017. He made his Twenty20 debut for Shinepukur Cricket Club against Legends of Rupganj in the 2018–19 Dhaka Premier Division Twenty20 Cricket League on 25 February 2019.
