= Mosabbek Hossain =

Bangladeshi cricketer (born 1998)

Personal information
- Born: 15 October 1998 (age 28)
- Source: Cricinfo, 2 May 2017

Mosabbek Hossain (born 15 October 1998) is a Bangladeshi cricketer. He made his List A debut for Kala Bagan Krira Chakra in the 2016–17 Dhaka Premier Division Cricket League on 2 May 2017. Prior to his List A debut, he represented Bangladesh in the 3rd-place playoff match against Sri Lanka in the 2016 Under-19 Cricket World Cup.
