= Abul Hasan (cricketer) =

Bangladeshi cricketer (born 1992)

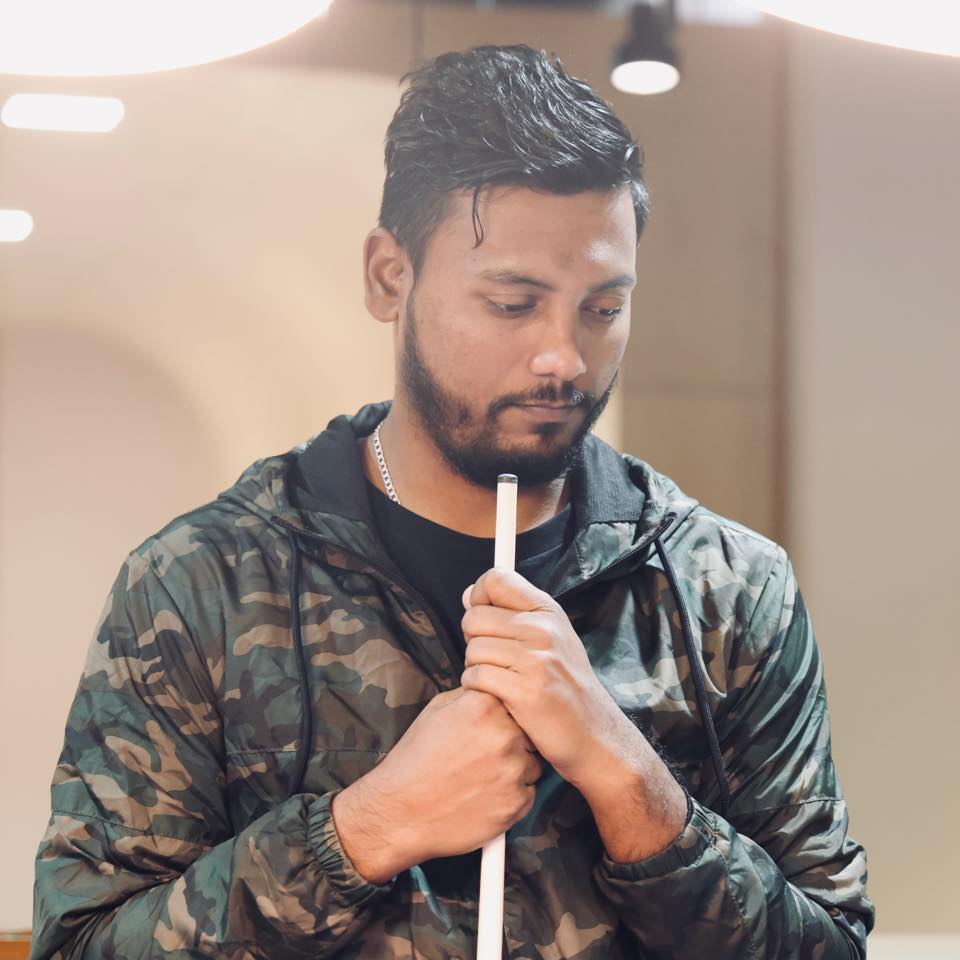

Personal information
- Full name: Mohammad Abul Hasan
- Born: 5 August 1992 (age 34); Kulaura, Moulvibazar, Sylhet, Bangladesh
- Nickname: Raju
- Height: 6 ft 1 in (1.85 m)
- Batting: Left-handed
- Bowling: Right-arm medium-fast
- Role: Bowling all-rounder

International information
- National side: Bangladesh
- Test debut (cap 65): 21 November 2012 v West Indies
- Last Test: 16 March 2013 v Sri Lanka
- ODI debut (cap 102): 30 November 2012 v West Indies
- Last ODI: 25 January 2018 v Sri Lanka
- ODI shirt no.: 10
- T20I debut (cap 30): 18 July 2012 v Ireland
- Last T20I: 3 June 2018 v Afghanistan

Domestic team information
- Years: Team
- 2008–: Sylhet Division
- 2013: Duronto Rajshahi
- 2015: Dhaka Dynamites
- 2016: Rajshahi Kings
- 2017: Sylhet Sixers
- 2018: Rangpur Riders

Career statistics
Competition	Test	ODI	FC	LA
Matches	3	6	20	35
Runs scored	166	4	506	402
Batting average	83	2.00	22.00	20.10
100s/50s	1/0	0/0	1/2	0/3
Top score	113	3	113	72
Balls bowled	528	192	2,450	1,233
Wickets	3	0	33	28
Bowling average	123.66	–	41.36	37.64
5 wickets in innings	0	–	0	1
10 wickets in match	0	–	0	0
Best bowling	2/80	–	4/78	5/32
Catches/stumpings	3/–	1/–	7/–	9/–
- Source: ESPNcricinfo, 19 October 2015

Abul Hasan (born 5 August 1992) is a Bangladeshi cricketer. A bowling allrounder, he is a right-arm medium-fast bowler and a robust left-handed lower-order batsman.

== International career ==
Abul Hasan has played Tests, One Day Internationals and Twenty20 Internationals for the Bangladesh national team. In his first Test, against the West Indies at Khulna in November 2012, he became only the fourth player to make a century batting at number 10, and the second to do so on debut - the first being Australia's Reggie Duff in 1902. Abul Hasan made 113 from 123 balls, and added 184 for the ninth wicket with Mahmudullah, which was the highest ninth wicket partnership for Bangladesh in Test. By coincidence, he had conceded 113 runs when bowling in the West Indies' first innings.

== Domestic career ==
Domestically, Abul Hasan plays for Sylhet Division, though he played for Duronto Rajshahi during the second season of the Bangladesh Premier League in 2013.

In February 2018, Abul Hasan and Taibur Rahman scored 136 runs for the eighth wicket for Kala Bagan Krira Chakra against Khelaghar Samaj Kallyan Samity in the 2017–18 Dhaka Premier Division Cricket League. Before the partnership, Kala Bagan Krira Chakra were 34 for 7 in the eleventh over of the match. This was the first partnership of more than 100 runs for a team seven wickets down for fewer than 100 runs in List A cricket in Bangladesh. He finished the tournament as the leading wicket-taker for Kala Bagan Krira Chakra, with 11 dismissals in 10 matches.

In October 2018, he was named in the squad for the Rangpur Riders team, following the draft for the 2018–19 Bangladesh Premier League.
