= David Zarifa =

Canadian sociologist

- Born: St.Thomas, Ontario, Canada
- Education: University of Western Ontario; McMaster University
- Scientific career
- Fields: Sociology
- Workplaces: Nipissing University

David Zarifa is a Canadian academic, currently a Canada Research Chair in Life Course Transitions in Northern and Rural Communities at Nipissing University. Zarifa is a Professor of Sociology in the Faculty of Arts & Science at Nipissing University in North Bay, Ontario. His areas of specialization include sociology of education, social inequality, sociology of work, and quantitative research methods.
