= Amit Majumder =

Bangladeshi cricketer (born 1991)

Personal information
- Born: 1 January 1991 (age 35); Khulna, Bangladesh
- Batting: Left-handed
- Bowling: Legbreak

Domestic team information
- Years: Team
- 2008–present: Khulna Division
- 2014–2015: Sheikh Jamal Dhanmondi Club
- 2015–2016: Cricket Coaching School
- 2016–2019 & 2022: Khelaghar Samaj Kallyan Samity
- 2019–2021: Prime Bank CC
- 2025–present: Rupganj Tigers Cricket Club

Career statistics
Competition	FC	LA	T20
Matches	53	97	6
Runs scored	2,262	2,560	43
Batting average	26.30	28.44	10.75
100s/50s	2/12	1/16	0/0
Top score	145	101	27
Balls bowled	18	–	–
Wickets	0	–	–
Bowling average	–	–	–
5 wickets in innings	–	–	–
10 wickets in match	–	–	–
Best bowling	–	–	–
Catches/stumpings	45/–	30/–	2/–
- Source: Cricinfo, 16 April 2025

Amit Majumder (born 1 January 1991) is a Bangladeshi first-class cricketer who plays for Khulna Division. In April 2017, he scored his first century in List A cricket, playing for Khelaghar Samaj Kallyan Samity (KSKS) in the 2016–17 Dhaka Premier Division Cricket League. He made his Twenty20 debut for KSKS in the 2018–19 Dhaka Premier Division Twenty20 Cricket League on 25 February 2019. He also represented Bangladesh in the 2008 U-19 Cricket World Cup.
