= Tanbir Hayder =

Bangladeshi cricketer (born 1991)

Personal information
- Full name: Md Tanbir Hayder Khan
- Born: 5 December 1991 (age 34); Rangpur, Bangladesh
- Batting: Right-handed
- Bowling: Legbreak
- Role: Bowling all-rounder

International information
- National side: Bangladesh
- ODI debut (cap 122): 29 December 2016 v New Zealand
- Last ODI: 31 December 2016 v New Zealand

Domestic team information
- Years: Team
- 2016: Kala Bagan Krira Chakra
- 2016/17: Dhaka Dynamites
- 2014/15–2015/16: Central Zone
- 2012/13–2013/14: North Zone
- 2011/12–2016/17: Rangpur Division
- 2009/10: Bangladesh Cricket Board XI
- 2009/10–2010/11: Sylhet Division

Career statistics
Competition	FC	LA	T20
Matches	107	142	47
Runs scored	4607	2938	500
Batting average	30.91	30.28	22.72
100s/50s	8/23	1/15	0/2
Top score	177	132*	71
Balls bowled	7317	2459	295
Wickets	136	74	8
Bowling average	34.60	30.14	50.00
5 wickets in innings	0	1	0
10 wickets in match	0	0	0
Best bowling	4/62	5/41	2/26
Catches/stumpings	100/–	71/–	18/–
Medal record
Representing Bangladesh
Men's Cricket
South Asian Games
Gold medal – first place	2010 Dhaka	Team
- Source: ESPNcricinfo, 1 October 2025

Tanbir Hayder Khan (born 5 December 1991) is a Bangladeshi cricketer. He made his first senior appearances in 2010, playing in two first-class matches for Sylhet Division. He later made his List A debut for the Bangladesh Cricket Board XI, playing against the touring England XI.

In May 2017, he took his first five-wicket haul in a List A match, playing for Sheikh Jamal in the 2016–17 Dhaka Premier Division Cricket League.

== International career ==
In November 2016, he was named in a 22-man preparatory squad to train in Australia, ahead of Bangladesh's tour to New Zealand. In December 2016 he was named in Bangladesh's One Day International (ODI) squad for their series against New Zealand. He made his ODI debut for Bangladesh on 29 December 2016 against New Zealand.

In January 2018, he was added to Bangladesh's Test squad for their series against Sri Lanka.
