= Imtiaz Hossain =

Bangladeshi cricketer (born 1985)

Personal information
- Full name: Imtiaz Hossain
- Born: 24 February 1985 (age 41); Sylhet, Bangladesh
- Nickname: Tanna
- Batting: Right-handed
- Bowling: Right-arm off break
- Role: Batter

Domestic team information
- Years: Team
- 2002–present: Sylhet Division
- 2010: Kings of Khulna
- 2012–2013: Sylhet Royals
- 2013–2014: Brothers Union
- 2015–2018: Prime Doleshwar Sporting Club
- 2018–2019: Sheikh Jamal Dhanmondi Club
- 2019-2021: Khelaghar Samaj Kallyan Samity
- 2021-present: Brothers Union
- FC debut: 2 January 2002 Sylhet v Khulna Division
- LA debut: 6 January 2002 Sylhet v Khulna Division

Career statistics
Competition	FC	LA	T20
Matches	113	96	3
Runs scored	5,698	2,367	27
Batting average	28.77	24.91	9.00
100s/50s	7/26	3/10	0/0
Top score	154	124	13
Balls bowled	3,658	1,746	–
Wickets	55	44	–
Bowling average	34.87	33.27	–
5 wickets in innings	0	0	–
10 wickets in match	0	0	–
Best bowling	3/50	4/22	–
Catches/stumpings	70/–	31/–	0/–
- Source: CricketArchive, 25 May 2016

Imtiaz Hossain (born 24 February 1985) is a first-class and List A cricketer from Bangladesh.

A right-handed batsman and off-break bowler, he made his debut for Sylhet Division in 2001–02. His highest first-class score is 154 for Sylhet Division against Rajshahi Division in 2015–16. His best bowling figures, 3 for 50, came against Khulna Division in 2001–02. His highest List A score is 124 for Sylhet Division against Barisal Division and his best List A bowling figures are 4 for 22 against Chittagong Division in 2001–02.
