= Nuruzzaman Masum =

Bangladeshi cricketer (born 1990)

Personal information
- Born: 12 March 1990 (age 36)
- Source: Cricinfo, 29 May 2017

Nuruzzaman Masum (born 12 March 1990) is a Bangladeshi cricketer. He made his first-class debut for Dhaka Division in the 2013–14 National Cricket League on 19 April 2014. He made his List A debut for Partex Sporting Club in the 2014–15 Dhaka Premier Division Cricket League on 11 November 2014.
