= Masum Khan (cricketer) =

Bangladeshi cricketer (born 1987)

Personal information
- Full name: Mohammad Masum Khan
- Born: 5 July 1987 (age 39); Khulna, Bangladesh
- Nickname: Tutul
- Batting: Right-handed
- Bowling: Right arm medium fast

Domestic team information
- Years: Team
- 2013–2022: Khelaghar Samaj Kallyan Samity
- 2023: Shinepukur Cricket Club

Career statistics
Competition	FC	LA	T20
Matches	10	63	13
Runs scored	233	815	171
Batting average	25.88	18.95	24.42
100s/50s	0/2	0/0	0/1
Top score	61*	44	59
Balls bowled	1077	2393	223
Wickets	17	62	7
Bowling average	27.29	33.00	45.28
5 wickets in innings	0	0	0
10 wickets in match	0	0	0
Best bowling	4/34	4/5	2/32
Catches/stumpings	8/0	26/0	5/0
- Source: CricketArchive, 22 January 2024

Mohammad Masum Khan (Bengali: মোহাম্মদ মাসুম খান; born 5 July 1987) is a Bangladeshi cricketer. He made his List A debut for Khelaghar Samaj Kallyan Samity in the 2013–14 edition of the Dhaka Premier Division Cricket League on 22 September 2013. He made his Twenty20 debut for Khelaghar Samaj Kallyan Samity in the 2018–19 Dhaka Premier Division Twenty20 Cricket League on 25 February 2019. He made his first-class debut on 10 October 2019, for Chittagong Division against Dhaka Metropolis in the 2019–20 National Cricket League.
