= Tamim Bashir =

Bangladeshi cricketer

Personal information
- Full name: Tamim Bashir
- Born: 1984 or 1985
- Died: 18 June 2004; Renal Hospital, Dhaka
- Nickname: Tushar
- Bowling: Right-arm off spin
- Role: All-rounder

Career statistics
Competition	First-class	List A
Matches	15	11
Runs scored	593	91
Batting average	37.06	30.33
100s/50s	0/4	0/0
Top score	98*	27
Balls bowled	2,538	531
Wickets	44	13
Bowling average	24.52	23.61
5 wickets in innings	3	1
10 wickets in match	0	0
Best bowling	6/41	5/32
Catches/stumpings	7/–	4/–
- Source: ESPNcricinfo, 14 September, 2014

Tamim Bashir was a first-class and List A cricketer from Bangladesh who died of cerebral malaria on 18 June 2004, aged only 19.

He was a talented left-arm spinner who had already played 15 first-class matches for Khulna Division and fell ill while training with the Bangladesh high performance unit. Tamim Bashir, nicknamed "Tushar" on some scoresheets, claimed 44 wickets at 24.52, and was also a handy batsman, being stranded on 98 not out against Chittagong Division at Jessore in January 2004. His best bowling, six for 41, came against Dhaka Division at Jessore in 2001–02, when he was just 16 years old. He also took a five wicket haul in List A cricket.

Bashir died after contracting malaria on a vacation to Rangamati. Returning to Dhaka, he continued training despite having a fever. On 18 June 2014, he was taken unconscious to the Renal Hospital in Dhaka, where he died in a matter of hours. His death led to a call by former Bangladesh captain Naimur Rahman and then-captain Habibul Bashar to call for stronger representation for Bangladeshi players through their player's association.
