= Jony Talukdar =

Bangladeshi cricketer (born 1993)

Personal information
- Born: 6 June 1993 (age 33); Narayanganj, Bangladesh
- Relatives: Rony Talukdar (brother)
- Source: ESPNcricinfo, 25 September 2016

Jony Talukdar (born 6 June 1993) is a Bangladeshi cricketer who has played for Dhaka Division. He made his Twenty20 debut for Uttara Sporting Club in the 2018–19 Dhaka Premier Division Twenty20 Cricket League on 26 February 2019. His brother Rony is an international cricketer for Bangladesh, having made his debut in Twenty20 Internationals in July 2015, and in One Day Internationals in May 2023.

== See also ==
- List of Dhaka Division cricketers
- List of Prime Bank Cricket Club cricketers
