= Mohammad Arafat =

Bangladeshi cricketer (born 1994)

Personal information
- Full name: Arafat Sunny jnr
- Born: 10 December 1994 (age 31); Faridpur, Bangladesh
- Source: Cricinfo, 20 April 2017

Mohammad Arafat (born 10 December 1994) is a Bangladeshi cricketer, who plays as a left-handed opening batsman. He made his first-class debut for Rangpur Division in the 2015–16 National Cricket League on 13 April 2017. He made his Twenty20 debut for Prime Doleshwar Sporting Club in the 2018–19 Dhaka Premier Division Twenty20 Cricket League on 25 February 2019.
