= Habibur Rahman (cricketer) =

Bangladeshi cricketer (born 1987)

Personal information
- Born: 18 July 1987 (age 39)
- Role: All-rounder
- Source: ESPNcricinfo, 25 September 2016

Habibur Rahman (born 18 July 1987) is a Bangladeshi first-class cricketer who plays for Rajshahi Division. He made his Twenty20 (T20) debut on 21 November 2016 playing for Comilla Victorians in the 2016–17 Bangladesh Premier League.

== See also ==
- List of Rajshahi Division cricketers
