= Abdul Mazid =

Bangladeshi cricketer (born 1991)

Personal information
- Full name: Mohammad Abdul Mazid
- Born: 1 January 1991 (age 35); Mymensingh, Bangladesh
- Batting: Right-handed
- Bowling: Right-arm off-spin

Domestic team information
- Years: Team
- 2010-11 – present: Dhaka Division
- 2016: Khulna Titans
- 2019-20: Sylhet Thunder

Career statistics
Competition	FC	LA	T20
Matches	115	128	29
Runs scored	6,369	4,137	536
Batting average	35.58	34.76	18.48
100s/50s	14/32	10/29	0/3
Top score	253*	118	57
Balls bowled	457	75	0
Wickets	1	1	–
Bowling average	266.00	85.00	–
5 wickets in innings	0	0	–
10 wickets in match	–	–	–
Best bowling	1/47	1/16	–
Catches/stumpings	82/1	59/5	7/–
- Source: Cricinfo, 4 June 2026

Mohammad Abdul Mazid (born 1 January 1991) is a Bangladeshi first-class cricketer who has played for Dhaka Division since 2011.

An opening batsman, Abdul Mazid made his first-class debut against Rajshahi Division in 2010–11, scoring 51 off 64 balls. In his first three seasons he played 16 matches and made 734 runs at an average of 27.18, with one century, 104 not out against Rangpur Division in 2012–13, when he and Rony Talukdar put on 191 for the first wicket.

In 2013-14 Abdul Mazid was fifth in the national aggregates, with 721 runs at an average of 60.08. He made two centuries: 182 against Rajshahi Division, when he shared a 197-run opening partnership with Talukdar, and, a week later, 142 against Dhaka Metropolis. Dhaka Division won the National Cricket League. He also scored two centuries in List A cricket for Abahani Limited.

Abdul Mazid toured the West Indies with Bangladesh A in May and June 2014, but was not selected in the playing eleven in either of the first-class matches. In the first first-class match of the 2014–15 season, he made 76 and put on 197 for the first wicket with Talukdar in an innings victory over Barisal Division. In the second match, against Dhaka Metropolis, he made 253 not out off 383 balls, putting on 314 for the first wicket with Talukdar, and batting throughout the innings of 525 for nine declared. Again Dhaka Division won by an innings. In the third match, another innings victory, he made 113, putting on 301 with Talukdar. He made his Twenty20 (T20) debut on 9 November 2016 playing for Khulna Titans in the 2016–17 Bangladesh Premier League.

In November 2018, while batting for Central Zone in the 2018–19 Bangladesh Cricket League, Abdul Mazid scored his tenth century in first-class cricket. He was the leading run-scorer for Central Zone in the tournament, with 410 runs in six matches.
