= Jubair Ahmed =

Bangladeshi cricketer (born 1987)

Personal information
- Full name: Jubair Ahmed
- Born: 10 February 1987 (age 39); Rajshahi, Bangladesh
- Batting: Right-handed
- Bowling: Right-arm fast-medium

Domestic team information
- Years: Team
- 2005–: Rajshahi Division
- 2013–: Barisal Burners
- FC debut: 21 April 2005 Barisal Division v Rajshahi Division
- LA debut: 20 April 2005 Barisal Division v Rajshahi Division

Career statistics
Competition	FC	LA	T20
Matches	23	11	1
Runs scored	739	140	0
Batting average	26.39	20.00	0.00
100s/50s	0/3	0/0	0/0
Top score	89	46	0
Balls bowled	672	149	–
Wickets	11	2	–
Bowling average	24.81	58.50	–
5 wickets in innings	0	0	–
10 wickets in match	0	0	–
Best bowling	2/19	1/30	–
Catches/stumpings	17/–	3/–	0/–
- Source: CricketArchive, 22 January 2013

Jubair Ahmed (born 10 February 1987) is a Bangladeshi first-class cricketer who represents Rajshahi Division and Barisal Burners in the Bangladesh Premier League. He is a right-handed batsman and right-arm fast-medium bowler. He made his debut for Rajshahi Division in April 2005 against Sylhet Division.
