= Uttam Sarkar =

Bangladeshi cricketer (born 1986)

Uttam Kumar Sarkar
Personal information
- Full name: Uttam Kumar Sarkar
- Born: 1986 (age 39–40); Madhukhali Upazila, Bangladesh
- Role: Batsman, Bowler

Uttam Kumar Sarkar (born 1986) is a Bangladeshi cricketer who plays for Dhaka Division in Bangladeshi domestic cricket. During the 2005–06 season, he also played for Security Express in the Corporate League and Kalabagan in the Premier League for clubs. Sarkar has also played for the Bangladesh Cricket Control Board Academy in Pakistan, and was selected for a Bangladesh "B team" of 13 for practice matches ahead of the 2006 ICC Champions Trophy.

Sarkar made his first-class debut in January 2004, when he played for Dhaka against Rajshahi Division and scored 26 runs in two innings as a specialist batsman. Then, he disappeared from the first-class scene, and though he played in club matches in the late months of 2005, he only returned to first-class cricket with a half-century in a National One-Day League match, which led Dhaka Division to 116 for two, chasing 178 to win. Dhaka won by six wickets, and Sarkar was retained for the first-class fixture against Khulna the following day. After falling for 14 in the first innings, he returned to bat on the following day and was part of the season's highest opening partnership, adding 203 with Anwar Hossain. In his next first-class game, against Rajshahi Division, he was given the chance to bowl for the first time, and retrieved match figures of four for 41 from 18 overs; however, when Dhaka were set 349 to win in the final innings, Sarkar was bowled by Shafaq Al Zabir for an 11-ball duck.

Sarkar contributed three more first-class half-centuries during the season: one as Dhaka drew the match with Barisal, and 71 and 60 in a draw with Khulna Division. Three of his four first-class half-centuries thus came against Khulna, who finished bottom of the first-class league in the 2005–06 season, as did his only Man of the Match award, which came in a one-day game where he scored 124 and shared an opening stand of 199 with Anwar Hossain. This was the highest partnership of the one-day league that season. Dhaka won by 50 runs after totalling 296 for nine, with Sarkar first out: he had hit 17 fours and two sixes in his 124. In 2015 he joined Madhukhali Cricket Academy as main coach. He was also assistant coach of Faridpur district cricket academy. He comes from Madhukhali.
