= Jasimuddin (cricketer) =

Bangladeshi cricketer (born 1995)

Personal information
- Full name: Md Jasim Uddin
- Born: 26 December 1995 (age 30); Bandarban district, Chittagong Division
- Batting: Right-handed
- Role: Wicket-keeper-batsman

Domestic team information
- Years: Team
- 2012: Sheikh Jamal Cricket Academy
- Source: ESPNcricinfo, 2 January 2017

Md Jasim Uddin (Bengali: মোঃ জসিম উদ্দিন) also known as Jasimuddin (Born:26 December 1995)(Bengali: জসিমউদ্দিন). Jasimuddin is a Bangladeshi cricketer. He made his first-class debut for Chittagong Division in the 2012–13 National Cricket League.

== Career ==
Jashimuddin made his U-19 debut in 2013 between West Indies U-19 vs Bangladesh U-19. Jasimuddin scored 66 runs off 92 balls in that match
