= Rubel Mia =

Bangladeshi cricketer (born 1992)

Personal information
- Born: 5 August 1992 (age 34); Dhaka, Bangladesh
- Source: Cricinfo, 30 April 2017

Rubel Mia (born 5 August 1992) is a Bangladeshi cricketer. He made his List A debut for Old DOHS Sports Club in the 2014–15 Dhaka Premier Division Cricket League on 11 November 2014. He made his Twenty20 debut for Prime Bank Cricket Club in the 2018–19 Dhaka Premier Division Twenty20 Cricket League on 26 February 2019. He was the leading run-scorer during the tournament, with 129 runs in three matches.

In November 2019, he was selected to play for the Sylhet Thunder in the 2019–20 Bangladesh Premier League. He made his first-class debut on 7 November 2021, for Dhaka Division in the 2021–22 National Cricket League.
