= Nasiruddin Faruque =

Bangladeshi cricketer (born 1983)

Personal information
- Born: 31 August 1983 (age 43); Dhaka, Bangladesh
- Batting: Left-handed
- Bowling: Right-arm (unknown style)

Domestic team information
- Years: Team
- 2016: Gazi Group Cricketers
- 2014/15–2015/16: Dhaka Division
- 2003/04–2012/13: Barisal Division
- First-class debut: 10 December 2003 Barisal Division v Dhaka Division
- Last First-class: 31 October 2015 Dhaka Division v Dhaka Metropolis
- List A debut: 14 December 2003 Barisal Division v Dhaka Division
- Last List A: 30 May 2016 Gazi Group Cricketers v Brothers Union

Career statistics
Competition	FC	LA	T20
Matches	66	47	1
Runs scored	2961	1195	27
Batting average	28.74	28.45	27.00
100s/50s	6/14	1/6	–/–
Top score	141	115	27
Balls bowled	444	6	–
Wickets	3	–	–
Bowling average	90.00	–	–
5 wickets in innings	–	–	–
10 wickets in match	–	–	–
Best bowling	2/24	0/1	–
Catches/stumpings	37/–	10/–	–/–
- Source: Cricket Archive, 15 December 2016

Nasiruddin Faruque is a first-class and List A cricketer from Bangladesh. He was born on 31 August 1983 and is a left-handed batsman. He made his debut for Barisal Division in 2003/04 and played through the 2006/07 season. He has also represented Bangladesh A from 2003/04 to 2006/07 and Bangladesh Under-23s in 2003/04.

He has scored 2 first-class hundreds, with a highest knock of 141 against Sylhet Division and 6 fifties. His only one day hundred to date, 115, was scored against the same team.
