= Mohammad Shahzada =

Bangladeshi cricketer (born 1986)

Mohammad Shahzada Hossain (born September 10, 1986, in Rasai) is a Bangladeshi cricketer who plays first-class cricket for Rajshahi Division. He is a right-arm medium-fast bowler and has also represented the Bangladesh Cricket Board XI.
