= Taibur Rahman =

Bangladeshi cricketer (born 1991)

Personal information
- Born: 10 August 1991 (age 35); Narayanganj, Bangladesh
- Nickname: Parvez
- Batting: Left-handed
- Bowling: Slow left-arm orthodox
- Role: Allrounder

Career statistics
Competition	FC	LA	T20
Matches	100	164	24
Runs scored	4,721	3,533	296
Batting average	34.45	35.68	22.76
100s/50s	7/25	3/20	0/1
Top score	242	114*	63*
Balls bowled	5,747	4,024	258
Wickets	103	98	14
Bowling average	26.92	30.71	21.57
5 wickets in innings	1	0	0
10 wickets in match	0	0	0
Best bowling	5/40	4/24	3/22
Catches/stumpings	31/–	66/–	7/–
- Source: ESPNcricinfo, 1 October 2025

Taibur Rahman (born 10 August 1991) is a Bangladeshi cricketer.

In February 2018, Taibur Rahman and Abul Hasan scored 136 runs for the eighth wicket for Kala Bagan Krira Chakra against Khelaghar Samaj Kallyan Samity in the 2017–18 Dhaka Premier Division Cricket League. Before the partnership, Kala Bagan Krira Chakra were 34 for 7 in the eleventh over of the match. This was the first partnership of more than 100 runs for a team seven wickets down for fewer than 100 runs in List A cricket in Bangladesh. He was the leading run-scorer in the 2019–20 National Cricket League, with 523 runs in six matches.
