= Monir Hossain =

Bangladeshi cricketer (born 1985)

Personal information
- Full name: Monir Hossain Khan
- Born: 27 January 1986 (age 40); Barisal, Bangladesh
- Batting: Left-handed
- Bowling: Slow left-arm orthodox
- Role: Bowler

Domestic team information
- Years: Team
- 2006–2008, 2010–present: Barisal Division
- 2009: Sylhet Division
- 2012–2013: Duronto Rajshahi
- 2013, 2017: Victoria Sporting Club
- 2016: Prime Bank Cricket Club
- 2021: Pune Devils
- First-class debut: 24 February 2006 Barisal Division v Rajshahi Division
- List A debut: 15 February 2006 Barisal Division v Chittagong Division

Career statistics
Competition	FC	LA	T20
Matches	57	64	28
Runs scored	1,087	364	27
Batting average	14.11	13.00	4.50
100s/50s	0/3	0/0	0/0
Top score	70	43	14
Balls bowled	12,035	3,177	564
Wickets	181	98	22
Bowling average	29.78	23.66	29.86
5 wickets in innings	8	1	0
10 wickets in match	0	0	0
Best bowling	6/27	5/38	2/22
Catches/stumpings	31/–	19/–	1/–
- Source: CricketArchive, 4 September 2017

Monir Hossain (born 27 January 1985) is a Bangladeshi cricketer who has played at first-class, List A and Twenty20 level. He is a left-handed batsman and slow left arm orthodox bowler. He has represented Barisal Division and Sylhet Division in First-class and List A cricket. He has played with Duronto Rajshahi and the Barisal Bulls in the Bangladesh Premier League.

== Career ==
Monir made his First-class and List A debuts for Barisal Division in February 2006, against Rajshahi Division and Chittagong Division respectively. After playing for Sylhet Division in 2009, he returned to Barisal Division in 2010.

Monir was selected by Duronto Rajshahi for the 2012–13 Bangladesh Premier League. In October 2016, he was selected by the Barisal Bulls for the 2016–17 Bangladesh Premier League draft.

Playing for Barisal Division against Rajshahi Division in the National Cricket League in November 2018, Monir finished the Rajshahi first innings by taking a hat-trick, dismissing all three victims leg before wicket.

In November 2019, Monir was selected to play for the Sylhet Thunder in the 2019–20 Bangladesh Premier League.
