= Mohammad Azim =

Bangladeshi cricketer

Domestic team information
- Years: Team
- 2015/16: Prime Bank Cricket Club
- 2014/15: Partex Sporting Club
- 2013/14: Dhaka Metropolis
- 2009/10: Barisal Division
- 2006/07–2010/11: Dhaka Division
- FC debut: 27 November 2006 Dhaka Division v Rajshahi Division
- Last FC: 27 February 2014 Dhaka Metropolis v Dhaka Division
- LA debut: 27 March 2007 Dhaka Division v Barisal Division
- Last LA: 20 June 2016 Prime Bank Cricket Club v Mohammedan Sporting Club

Career statistics
Competition	First-class	List A
Matches	15	29
Runs scored	59	111
Batting average	6.55	12.33
100s/50s	0/0	0/0
Top score	16	39*
Balls bowled	2048	1212
Wickets	33	40
Bowling average	32.66	26.02
5 wickets in innings	1	0
10 wickets in match	0	0
Best bowling	5/54	3/23
Catches/stumpings	6/–	2/–
- Source: Cricket Archive, 10 December 2016

Mohammad Azim is a first-class and List A cricketer from Bangladesh. He made his debut for Dhaka Division in 2006/07 and impressed with 5 for 54 against Dhaka Division.
