= Nazmus Sadat =

Bangladeshi cricketer (born 1986)

Personal information
- Born: 18 October 1986 (age 40); Khulna, Bangladesh
- Batting: Left-handed
- Bowling: Slow left-arm orthodox

International information
- National side: Bangladesh
- Only T20I (cap 8): 28 November 2006 v Zimbabwe

Domestic team information
- Years: Team
- 2004/05–2010/11: Khulna Division
- 2009/10: Sylhet Division

Career statistics
Competition	T20I	FC	LA	T20
Matches	1	59	84	6
Runs scored	4	3,005	2,153	101
Batting average	4.00	28.08	30.32	25.25
100s/50s	0/0	2/20	1/16	0/1
Top score	4	151	110*	90*
Balls bowled	–	2,372	2,163	12
Wickets	–	23	52	0
Bowling average	–	57.82	33.21	–
5 wickets in innings	–	0	0	–
10 wickets in match	–	0	0	–
Best bowling	–	2/12	4/59	–
Catches/stumpings	0/–	27/–	16/–	1/–
- Source: CricketArchive, 25 January 2025

Nazmus Sadat (born 18 October 1986) is a Bangladeshi cricketer who has represented Bangladesh A and has played a Twenty20 International for his country. A left-handed batsman, he plays domestic cricket for Khulna Division.
