= Alauddin Babu =

Bangladeshi cricketer (born 1991)

Personal information
- Born: 5 December 1991 (age 34); Rangpur, Bangladesh
- Batting: Right-handed
- Bowling: Right-arm medium-fast
- Role: All-rounder

Domestic team information
- Years: Team
- 2010: Rajshahi Division
- 2011-present: Rangpur Division
- 2012-2013: Barisal Burners
- 2016: Dhaka Dynamites
- 2019: Rajshahi Kings
- 2019-20: Khulna Tigers
- 2022: Sylhet Sunrisers
- 2024: Durdanto Dhaka
- 2025: Dhaka Capitals

Career statistics
Competition	FC	LA	T20
Matches	37	109	84
Runs scored	1,228	1,212	527
Batting average	25.58	16.60	14.24
100s/50s	2/4	0/3	0/0
Top score	180	81	47
Balls bowled	4,802	4,156	1289
Wickets	92	126	81
Bowling average	29.68	29.78	22.07
5 wickets in innings	1	2	1
10 wickets in match	0	0	0
Best bowling	6/56	5/35	5/16
Catches/stumpings	20/–	26/–	31/–
- Source: Cricinfo, 6 June 2026

Alauddin Babu (born 5 December 1991) is a Bangladeshi cricketer.

== Under-19s career ==
Babu is a right-arm fast bowler who can bat in the middle-order. He was included in the Bangladesh squad for the 2010 2010 Under-19 Cricket World Cup in New Zealand. He took a four-wicket haul in the first four-day match against England Under-19s in July 2009.

== Domestic career ==
Babu first earned attention in 2008, when he took an eight-wicket haul in Dhaka's First Division League, which is the level just below the Premier League. Earmarked as a future prospect, and consequently selected for the National Cricket Academy in 2010, he made his first-class debut for Rajshahi Division Cricket Team, and then moved to Rangpur Division when the region became a divisional cricket team the following year.

He played for Barisal Burners in the Bangladesh Premier League. He played important role in the getting Barisal Burners to get them into the finals.

In 2013, Elton Chigumbura of Sheikh Jamal Dhanmondi Club hammered 39 from the last over of the innings bowled by Alauddin. He gave away five off the first ball which was a no-ball, and then bowled a wide. Off the next five balls, Chigumbura alternated between sixes and fours before Alauddin bowled another wide and was finished off with a six. Alauddin ended up conceding 93 in his 10 overs. A world record at the time, it has since been broken, and now stands at 43 runs from one over.

In October 2018, he was named in the squad for the Rajshahi Kings team, following the draft for the 2018–19 Bangladesh Premier League.

In May 2021, he was selected to play for the Brothers Union in the 2021 Dhaka Premier Division Twenty20 Cricket League. In the 10th match of the tournament against the Legends of Rupganj, he picked up a hat-trick, being the only fifth Bangladeshi bowler to do so in Twenty20 cricket.
