= Myshukur Rahaman =

Bangladeshi cricketer (born 1991)

Personal information
- Born: 10 December 1991 (age 34); Nuranir, Bangladesh
- Nickname: Real
- Batting: Right-handed
- Bowling: Right-arm medium

Domestic team information
- Years: Team
- 2009/10: Sylhet Division
- 2010/11–2014/15: Rajshahi Division
- 2015/16–present: Dhaka Division
- 2012: Khulna Royal Bengals
- 2014–present: Sheikh Jamal Dhanmondi Club
- Source: ESPNcricinfo

Myshukur Rahaman (born 10 December 1991), also known as Maisuqur Rahman, is a Bangladeshi cricketer who plays for Dhaka Division in domestic cricket. He is a right-handed batsman and occasional right-arm medium pace bowler.
