= Nadif Chowdhury =

Bangladeshi cricketer (born 1987)

Personal information
- Born: 21 April 1987 (age 39); Manikganj, Bangladesh
- Batting: Right-handed
- Bowling: Slow left-arm orthodox

International information
- National side: Bangladesh
- T20I debut (cap 7): 28 November 2006 v Zimbabwe
- Last T20I: 20 September 2007 v Pakistan

Domestic team information
- Years: Team
- 2002–2006: Barisal Division
- 2006–2010: Dhaka Division
- 2010: Rajshahi Rangers
- 2010–2012: Sylhet Division
- 2012–present: Sylhet Royals
- 2012–present: Dhaka Division

Career statistics
Competition	T20I	FC	LA	T20
Matches	3	90	89	25
Runs scored	27	3955	1640	189
Batting average	9.00	32.15	23.09	11.81
100s/50s	0/0	5/20	0/9	0/0
Top score	12	114	83	31
Balls bowled	–	4,413	897	48
Wickets	–	72	15	3
Bowling average	–	30.04	40.53	21.33
5 wickets in innings	–	3	0	0
10 wickets in match	–	0	0	0
Best bowling	–	5/34	2/24	2/17
Catches/stumpings	0/–	69/1	30/–	7/–
- Source: Cricinfo, 23 June 2016

Nadif Chowdhury (born 21 April 1987) is a Bangladeshi cricketer who has represented the Bangladesh Under-19 and played Twenty20 Internationals for his country. He is a slow left-arm orthodox bowler and right-handed batsman. In domestic competitions he plays for Dhaka Division in first-class cricket, and captains Victoria Sporting Club in List A cricket.

In October 2018, he was named in the squad for the Rangpur Riders team, following the draft for the 2018–19 Bangladesh Premier League. In November 2019, he was selected to play for the Rangpur Rangers in the 2019–20 Bangladesh Premier League.
