= Mehedi Maruf =

Bangladeshi cricketer (born 1988)

Personal information
- Full name: Mehedi Hasan Siddiqui Maruf
- Born: 4 April 1988 (age 38); Tangail, Bangladesh
- Batting: Right-handed
- Bowling: Right-arm off-spin
- Role: Batsman

Domestic team information
- Years: Team
- Abahani Limited
- Barisal Division
- Prime Bank
- 2016-2018: Dhaka Dynamites
- 2019: Rangpur Riders
- 2023: Chattogram Challengers

Career statistics
Competition	FC	LA	T20
Matches	37	130	58
Runs scored	1,561	4,293	941
Batting average	25.17	35.47	18.09
100s/50s	3/4	8/27	0/4
Top score	141	137*	94
Balls bowled	42	6	0
Wickets	0	0	–
Bowling average	–	–	–
5 wickets in innings	–	–	–
10 wickets in match	–	–	–
Best bowling	–	–	–
Catches/stumpings	35/–	75/–	18/–
- Source: Cricinfo, 2 June 2024

Mehedi Hasan Siddiqui Maruf (born 4 April 1988) is a Bangladeshi first-class and List A cricketer. He is a right handed batsman. In October 2018, he was named in the squad for the Rangpur Riders team, following the draft for the 2018–19 Bangladesh Premier League.
