= Brothers Union cricket team =

Bangladeshi cricket team

Brothers Union
Personnel
- Captain: Zahiduzzaman

Brothers Union cricket team is a Bangladeshi cricket team that plays List A cricket in the Dhaka Premier Division Cricket League.

When the Brothers Union organisation was founded in Dacca in 1949, it concentrated on cultural activities. Sport came later, most prominently in the form of Brothers Union football team and the cricket team. The cricket club is one of the oldest extant in Bangladesh, having competed since 1973, when it was one of the clubs that played in the Dacca Metropolis Knockout Tournament.

== List A record ==
- 2013–14: 10 matches, won 4, finished seventh
- 2014–15: 11 matches, won 5, finished eighth
- 2015–16: 11 matches, won 4, finished tenth
- 2016–17: 11 matches, won 5, finished eighth
- 2017–18: 13 matches, won 6, finished tenth
- 2018–19: 13 matches, won 4, finished tenth
- 2021–22: 11 matches, won 4, finished ninth
- 2022–23: 11 matches, won 4, finished ninth
- 2023–24: 11 matches, won 3, finished eighth
- 2024–25: 13 matches, won 4, finished tenth
- 2025–26: 8 matches, won 1, finished last (relegated)

The List A captains have changed from season to season. In 2024–25 the captain was Myshukur Rahaman.

In their last match of the 2017–18 season, Brothers Union needed to score 335 runs to beat Agrani Bank and avoid relegation. At the end, they needed four off the last ball of the 50th over, and Nazmus Sadat hit a boundary to secure victory by four wickets. In 2018–19 they again avoided relegation by winning their final match, defeating Bangladesh Krira Shikkha Protishtan by six wickets, Fazle Mahmud scoring 127 not out. In 2024–25 they again avoided relegation by winning their final match, this time defeating Partex Sporting Club by 113 runs.

For some years the Brothers Union management had repeatedly failed to pay the players fully and promptly. After more such failures during the 2025–26 competition, the players refused to take the field on 5 June 2026 against Agrani Bank. Under the competition rules, the referee immediately awarded the match to Agrani Bank. Also under the rules, Brothers Union were removed from the tournament and relegated.

== Records ==
The highest List A score is 150 not out by Nafees Iqbal in 2013–14, and the best bowling figures are 7 for 25 by Sean Williams, also in 2013–14.
