= Rony Talukdar =

Bangladeshi cricketer (born 1990)

Personal information
- Born: 10 October 1990 (age 36); Narayanganj, Bangladesh
- Height: 5 ft 6 in (1.68 m)
- Batting: Right-handed
- Bowling: Right-arm medium-fast
- Role: Top-order batter
- Relatives: Jony Talukdar (brother)

International information
- National side: Bangladesh
- Only ODI (cap 141): 14 May 2023 v Ireland
- ODI shirt no.: 37
- T20I debut (cap 47): 7 July 2015 v South Africa
- Last T20I: 31 December 2023 v New Zealand

Domestic team information
- Years: Team
- 2008/09–2009/10: Barisal Division
- 2009/10–present: Dhaka Division
- 2015/16: Barisal Bulls
- 2016/17–2017/18: Rajshahi Kings
- 2018/19: Dhaka Dynamites
- 2019/20: Sylhet Thunder
- 2021/22: Khulna Tigers
- 2022/23–2023/24: Rangpur Riders
- 2024/25: Sylhet Strikers

Career statistics
Competition	ODI	T20I	FC	LA
Matches	1	11	112	159
Runs scored	4	224	6,076	4,330
Batting average	4.00	22.40	33.94	28.30
100s/50s	0/0	0/1	12/28	5/20
Top score	4	67	228*	141
Balls bowled	–	–	830	315
Wickets	–	–	12	6
Bowling average	–	–	35.00	35.00
5 wickets in innings	–	–	0	0
10 wickets in match	–	–	0	0
Best bowling	–	–	3/11	3/26
Catches/stumpings	1/–	2/1	80/–	63/4
Medal record
Representing Bangladesh
Men's Cricket
Asian Games
Gold medal – first place	2010 Guangzhou	Team
South Asian Games
Gold medal – first place	2010 Dhaka	Team
- Source: ESPNcricinfo, 18 July 2025

Rony Talukdar (Bengali: রনি তালুকদার; born 10 October 1990) (Note: Listed as 10 October 1990 in ESPNcricinfo and 29 May 1989 in CricketArchive) is a Bangladeshi cricketer. He is a right-handed batter. He made his international debut for Bangladesh in July 2015 against South Africa. He plays first-class cricket for Dhaka Division in Bangladesh. He was part of Bangladesh's squad for the Under-19 World Cup in 2008.

== Personal life ==
Talukdar is from a Hindu family of the Narayanganj district of Bangladesh. He studied at Southeast University.

== Domestic career ==
In the first three matches of the 2014-15 first-class season, opening the batting for Dhaka Division, Talukdar scored 227, 163 and 201 in three innings victories, sharing opening stands of 197, 314 and 301 with Abdul Mazid.

In October 2018, he was named in the squad for the Dhaka Dynamites team, following the draft for the 2018–19 Bangladesh Premier League. He was the leading run-scorer for Dhaka Division in the 2018–19 National Cricket League, with 426 runs in four matches. He was the also the leading run-scorer for East Zone in the tournament, with 460 runs in six matches. In November 2019, he was selected to play for the Sylhet Thunder in the 2019–20 Bangladesh Premier League.

In November 2022, he was named in the Rangpur Riders' squad, following the draft for the 2022–23 Bangladesh Premier League. In the second match of the tournament, on 6 January 2023, he smashed 67 runs off just 31 balls, helping Rangpur Riders to start their season with a convincing 34-run victory over the Comilla Victorians. He reached his fifty off just 19 balls, which is the fastest half-century by a Bangladeshi batter in the history of Bangladesh Premier League.

== International career ==
Talukdar made his Twenty20 International (T20I) debut against South Africa on 7 July 2015.

In March 2023, Talukdar returned to Bangladesh's T20I squad after 8 years as he was selected to play in the series against England. In the same month, he was also named in Bangladesh's ODI and T20I squad for their series against Ireland. On 27 March 2023, in the 1st T20I, Rony scored his maiden half-century in international cricket in just 24 balls, recording the third fastest fifty by Bangladeshi batter in T20Is. His score of 67 runs off 38 balls helped Bangladesh post 207/5, their third highest total in T20Is.

He made his One Day International (ODI) debut against Ireland on 14 May 2023.
