= Victoria Sporting Club cricket team =

Bangladeshi Cricket team

Victoria Sporting Club

Victoria Sporting Club is a team that played List A cricket in the Dhaka Premier League up to the 2016–17 season.

== History ==
Victoria Sporting Club won the Dhaka Premier League title four times in the years before it became a List A competition. In May 2017, they were relegated from the 2016–17 Dhaka Premier Division Cricket League down to the Dhaka First Division Cricket League.

== List A record ==
- 2013-14: 9 matches, won 4, finished eighth
- 2014-15: 11 matches, won 7, finished seventh
- 2015-16: 16 matches, won 9, finished fourth
- 2016-17: 13 matches, won 2, finished eleventh

Nasir Hossain was captain in 2013–14, Nadif Chowdhury in 2014-15 and 2015–16, and Monir Hossain in 2016–17.

== Records ==
The highest score was 161 not out (off 136 balls) by Chamara Kapugedera in 2014–15, and the best bowling figures were 6 for 35 by Chaturanga de Silva in 2015–16.
