= Khelaghar Samaj Kallyan Samity cricket team =

Bangladeshi cricket team

Khelaghar Samaj Kallyan Samity
- KSKS

Khelaghar Samaj Kallyan Samity is a Bangladeshi cricket team that has played List A cricket in the Dhaka Premier League in 2013–14, 2016–17, 2017–18 and 2021–22. Its name translates as "Khelaghar Social Welfare Association". Khelaghar is a patriotic youth cultural organization founded in Dacca in 1952, which has over 500 branches around Bangladesh.

== Playing history ==
In the inaugural List A status season of the League in 2013–14, captained by Faisal Hossain, Khelaghar Samaj Kallyan Samity finished last, with one win from 10 matches, and were relegated.

In 2014–15, in the non-List-A Dhaka First Division Cricket League, Khelaghar Samaj Kallyan Samity finished sixth with eight wins and eight losses; in 2015–16 they finished first in Group B of the Dhaka First Division League, and were promoted back to the Dhaka Premier League for 2016–17, captained by Nafees Iqbal. He also captained the team in 2017–18.

In March 2018, they reached the Super League section of the 2017–18 Dhaka Premier Division Cricket League. It was the first time the team had reached that section of the competition. In the 2021–22 competition they finished last, and were relegated again. They finished runners-up in the 2022–23 Dhaka First Division Cricket League, and were due to be promoted back to the Dhaka Premier Division Cricket League for the 2023–24 competition. However, in the event they remained in the First Division for 2023–24, replaced in the Premier Division by Partex Sporting Club.

=== List A record ===
- 2013–14: 10 matches, won 1, finished last (twelfth)
- 2016–17: 13 matches, won 5, finished tenth
- 2017–18: 16 matches, won 8, finished fifth
- 2018–19: 11 matches, won 3, finished ninth
- 2021–22: 12 matches, won 2, finished last (eleventh)

== Records ==
Khelaghar Samaj Kallyan Samity's highest individual List A score is 116 by Robiul Islam Robi against Legends of Rupganj in 2017–18. The best bowling figures are 6 for 18 by Tanvir Islam against Partex Sporting Club in 2016–17.

== See also ==
- Khelaghar Samaj Kallyan Samity
