= Partex Sporting Club =

Bangladesh cricket team

Personnel
- Captain: Sabbir Rahman; Alauddin Babu
- Owner: Partex Group

Partex Sporting Club is a Bangladesh cricket team that has played List A cricket in the Dhaka Premier League in the 2014–15, 2016–17, 2019–20, 2023–24 and 2024–25 competitions. It is owned by the Partex Group of companies.

== Playing history ==
Promoted from the lower division, Partex won their first match in 2014–15 but finished the season with only three wins from 13 matches, and were demoted for the 2015–16 season.

In 2015–16 Partex finished first in Group A of the non-List-A Dhaka First Division Cricket League, and were promoted back to the Dhaka Premier League for 2016–17. However, they won only one match and were again relegated from the Premier League to the First Division League.

In 2018–19 Partex finished second in the First Division League and thus qualified to return to the Premier League in 2019–20, but the tournament was abandoned shortly after it began, owing to the COVID-19 pandemic. Partex did not play again in the Premier League until the 2023–24 season. After two seasons in the Premier League, they were relegated again.

== List A record ==
- 2014–15: 13 matches, won 3, finished eleventh
- 2016–17: 13 matches, won 1, finished twelfth
- 2019–20: abandoned due to COVID-19 pandemic
- 2023–24: 11 matches, won 2, finished ninth
- 2024–25: 13 matches, won 4, finished eleventh

Partex has had several captains. Sabbir Rahman and Alauddin Babu captained the team in 2024–25.

== Records ==
The highest individual score for Partex is 111 not out made by Roshen Silva in 2014–15, and the best bowling figures are 5 for 31 by Shahidul Islam in 2024–25.
