= List of Khulna Royal Bengals cricketers =

This is presenting a complete list in alphabetical order of cricketers who played for Khulna Royal Bengals in Twenty20 matches held by the Bangladesh Premier League. The Khulna Royal Bengals franchise was formed ahead of the 2012 BPL edition and participated in the 2012 and 2013 BPL editions, the team then becoming defunct. Complying with other club lists, details are the player's name followed by his years active as a Khulna Royal Bengals player.

== A ==
- Abdur Razzak (2011–12)
- Andre Adams (New Zealand; 2011–12)
- Asif Ahmed (2012–13)

== B ==
- Samuel Badree (West Indies; 2012–13)
- Travis Birt (Australia; 2012–13)

== C ==
- Shivnarine Chanderpaul (West Indies; 2011–12)

== D ==
- Dolar Mahmud (2011–12 to 2012–13)

== F ==
- Farhad Reza (2012–13)

== G ==
- Herschelle Gibbs (South Africa; 2011–12)

== H ==
- Hammad Azam (Pakistan; 2011–12)
- Daniel Harris (Australia; 2012–13)

== J ==
- Sanath Jayasuriya (Sri Lanka; 2011–12)

== M ==
- Marshall Ayub (2011–12)
- Mithun Ali (2012–13)
- Mizanur Rahman (2012–13)
- Mohammad Hafeez (Pakistan; 2011–12)
- Jehan Mubarak (Sri Lanka; 2012–13)

== N ==
- Nabil Samad (2012–13)
- Nasir Hossain (2011–12)
- Nazimuddin (2012–13)
- Nazmul Hossain Milon (2011–12)
- Noor Hossain (2012–13)

== O ==
- Niall O'Brien (Ireland; 2011–12)

== R ==
- Andre Russell (West Indies; 2011–12)

== S ==
- Saghir Hossain (2011–12)
- Samiullah Shenwari (Afghanistan; 2012–13)
- Sanjamul Islam (2012–13)
- Krishmar Santokie (West Indies; 2012–13)
- Shafiul Islam (2011–12)
- Shahadat Hossain (2011–12 to 2012–13)
- Shahriar Nafees (2012–13)
- Shakib Al Hasan (2011–12)
- Shapoor Zadran (Afghanistan; 2012–13)
- Dwayne Smith (2011–12)

== V ==
- Lou Vincent (New Zealand; 2012–13)

== W ==
- Riki Wessels (England; 2012–13)
