= List of Duronto Rajshahi cricketers =

This is presenting a complete list in alphabetical order of cricketers who played for Duronto Rajshahi in Twenty20 matches held by the Bangladesh Premier League. The Duronto Rajshahi franchise was formed ahead of the 2012 BPL edition and participated in the 2012 and 2013 BPL editions, the team then becoming defunct. Complying with other club lists, details are the player's name followed by his years active as a Duronto Rajshahi player.

== A ==
- Abdul Razzaq (Pakistan; 2011–12)
- Abul Hasan (2012–13)
- Ariful Haque (2011–12)
- Asif Ahmed (2011–12)

== C ==
- Charles Coventry (Zimbabwe; 2012–13)

== E ==
- Ben Edmondson (Australia; 2012–13)
- Sean Ervine (Zimbabwe; 2011–12 to 2012–13)

== F ==
- Farhad Hossain (2012–13)
- Fawad Alam (Pakistan; 2011–12)

== J ==
- Jahurul Islam (2012–13)
- Junaid Siddique (2011–12)

== K ==
- Chamara Kapugedera (Sri Lanka; 2012–13)
- Simon Katich (Australia; 2012–13)
- Khalid Latif (Pakistan; 2011–12)

== M ==
- Mizanur Rahman (2011–12)
- Moeen Ali (England; 2012–13)
- Mohammad Sami (Pakistan; 2011–12)
- Monir Hossain (2011–12 to 2012–13)
- Muktar Ali (2011–12 to 2012–13)
- Dilshan Munaweera (Sri Lanka; 2012–13)
- Mushfiqur Rahim (2011–12)

== N ==
- Naeem Islam (2012–13)

== Q ==
- Qaiser Abbas (Pakistan; 2011–12)

== R ==
- Rizwan Cheema (Pakistan; 2011–12)

== S ==
- Sabbir Rahman (2011–12)
- Marlon Samuels (West Indies; 2011–12)
- Saqlain Sajib (2011–12)
- Shahzaib Hasan (Pakistan; 2011–12)
- Soumya Sarkar (2011–12)
- Syed Rasel (2011–12)

== T ==
- Taijul Islam (2011–12 to 2012–13)
- Tamim Iqbal (2012–13)

== U ==
- Isuru Udana (2012–13)

== Z ==
- Ziaur Rahman (2012–13)
