= Sitalpati =

Sitalpati may refer to:

- Sitalpati, Sindhuli, Janakpur Zone, Nepal
- Sitalpati, Sankhuwasabha, Nepal
- Shital pati, a kind of mat used on beds in Bangladesh and India
