= Icon player =

Status indicating an exceptional athlete

Icon player is a status given to an athlete to indicate that they are the most valued player in the team. The title is most commonly currently used in domestic cricket, particularly in the Bangladesh Premier League, Afghanistan Premier League and Euro T20 Slam. It was previously used in Indian Premier League, Pakistan Super League and Global T20 Canada. The status can sometimes denote that the player will be among the first to be drafted or auctioned in the league.

== Indian Premier League ==
Icon player was a status given to five players of the Indian Premier League. They were not a part of the first IPL players auction, which was held in 2008. They played for the team they were assigned to. The icon players received 15% percent more money than the highest-paid player of the team bought in the auction. As of the 2010 season, the clause pertaining to icon players has been removed on account of complaints by franchises with icon players that having these players was a handicap in the player auction.

Initially there were four icon players designated by the Indian Premier League organizing committee: Sachin Tendulkar for Mumbai Indians, Sourav Ganguly for Kolkata Knight Riders, Rahul Dravid for Royal Challengers Bangalore, and Yuvraj Singh for Kings XI Punjab. Later, on the request of Delhi Daredevils, Virender Sehwag's name was added to the list. Deccan Chargers also asked for Icon Player status to be given to VVS Laxman, but he declined the offer in order to allow the franchise to spend more money on other players and still not breach the US$5 million salary cap. The purpose behind designating the icon players is to ensure that top draw players will represent their respective city sides, which is important for the league to increase fan support and interest among the locals.

It has been reported that all the franchises with icon players felt that having the icon player was a handicap in the player auction, as the money spent on the icon resulted in less room under the salary cap to purchase other players. For example, the presence of Sachin Tendulkar as an icon player was cited as the main reason why Mumbai Indians could not compete with Chennai Super Kings for Mahendra Singh Dhoni.

== Pakistan Super League ==
The Icon player status was given to five players in the first season of the Pakistan Super League. The five players would be the first five to be drafted in the league so that every team would have an Icon player. The title was not exclusive to Pakistani players and three out of the five icon players were foreigners.

The decision created controversy as it was reported that Pakistan's captain, Misbah-ul-Haq and highest test scoring batsman, Younus Khan were unhappy with their exclusion as icon players and threatened to skip the league if they were not given leadership roles.

== Bangladesh Premier League ==
Icon player status was given to six players of the six team in the Bangladesh Premier League. Icon player status was available only for the first season. Icon players' base prize was US$ 210,000. They were not included in the auction list, and they would receive 15% more than the highest-paid local players. Later, icon status was excluded in the next season and first category local players were categorized as Golden Category. Again the icon category was introduced in the 2015 Bangladesh Premier League with a base price of US$ 50,000.

=== List of icon players in the BPL ===
- Mushfiqur Rahim for Comilla Victorians
- Taskin Ahmed for Dhaka Dynamites
- Tamim Iqbal for Khulna Titans
- Mustafizur Rahman for Rajshahi Kings
- Shakib Al Hasan for Rangpur Riders
- Liton Das for Sylhet Sixers

== Afghanistan Premier League ==
=== List of icon players in the APL ===
- Chris Gayle for Balkh Legends
- Rashid Khan for Kabul Zwanan
- Brendon McCullum for Kandahar Knights
- Andre Russell for Nangarhar Leopards
- Shahid Afridi for Paktia Panthers

== Euro T20 Slam ==
=== List of icon players in the ET20 Slam ===
- Shane Watson for Amsterdam Knights
- Shahid Afridi for Belfast Titans
- Eoin Morgan for Dublin Chiefs
- Martin Guptill for Edinburgh Rocks
- Brendon McCullum for Glasgow Giants
- Rashid Khan for Rotterdam Rhinos
