= List of Chittagong Vikings cricketers =

This is presenting a complete list in alphabetical order of cricketers who have played for Chittagong Vikings in Twenty20 matches held by the Bangladesh Premier League. The Chittagong Vikings franchise was formed ahead of the 2015 BPL edition, replacing the former Chittagong Kings team which participated in the 2012 and 2013 BPL editions. The list includes all players who represented the Kings. Complying with other club lists, details are the player's name followed by his years active as a Chittagong Kings/Vikings player, current players to the end of the 2015–16 Bangladeshi cricket season.

== A ==
- Aftab Ahmed (2012–13)
- Anamul Haque (2015–16)
- Arafat Sunny senior (2011–12 to 2012–13)
- Ariful Haque (2012–13)
- Asif Ahmed (2015–16)
- Asif Hasan (2015–16)

== B ==
- Bilawal Bhatti (Pakistan; 2015–16)
- Ravi Bopara (England; 2012–13)
- Dwayne Bravo (West Indies; 2011–12)

== C ==
- Elton Chigumbura (Zimbabwe; 2015–16)
- Kyle Coetzer (Scotland; 2011–12)
- Kevon Cooper (West Indies; 2011–12 to 2012–13)

== D ==
- Tillakaratne Dilshan (Sri Lanka; 2015–16)

== E ==
- Elias Sunny (2015–16)
- Enamul Haque (2011–12 to 2015–16)

== F ==
- Faisal Hossain (2011–12)
- Farhad Reza (2011–12)

== J ==
- Jahurul Islam (2011–12)
- Shehan Jayasuriya (Sri Lanka; 2012–13)

== K ==
- Kamran Akmal (Pakistan; 2015–16)
- Chamara Kapugedera (Sri Lanka; 2015–16)

== L ==
- Dilhara Lokuhettige (2012–13)

== M ==
- Mahmudullah (2011–12 to 2012–13)
- Marshall Ayub (2012–13)
- Mehrab Hossain (2012–13)
- Jeevan Mendis (Sri Lanka; 2015–16)
- David Miller (South Africa; 2012–13)
- Mohammad Amir (Pakistan; 2015–16)
- Muttiah Muralitharan (Sri Lanka; 2011–12)

== N ==
- Naeem Islam senior (2012–13 to 2015–16)
- Nasir Jamshed (Pakistan; 2011–12)
- Nurul Hasan (2012–13)

== O ==
- Jacob Oram (New Zealand; 2012–13)

== R ==
- Jason Roy (England; 2011–12 to 2012–13)
- Rubel Hossain (2012–13)

== S ==
- Saeed Ajmal (Pakistan; 2015–16)
- Sanjamul Islam (2011–12)
- Shafiul Islam (2015–16)
- Shamsur Rahman (2011–12)

== T ==
- Shaun Tait (Australia; 2012–13)
- Tamim Iqbal (2011–12 to 2015–16)
- Taskin Ahmed (2012–13 to 2015–16)
- Brendan Taylor (Zimbabwe; 2011–12 to 2012–13)
- Ryan ten Doeschate (Netherlands; 2012–13)

== U ==
- Umar Akmal (Pakistan; 2015–16)

== Y ==
- Yasir Ali (2015–16)

== Z ==
- Ziaur Rahman (2011–12 to 2015–16)
