= 2012 Bangladesh Premier League player auction =

The players auction for the 2012 Bangladesh Premier League was held on 19 January 2012 at the Hotel Radisson, Dhaka. Each franchise could sign a total of 10 local players and 8 foreign players, and could play no more than 5 foreign players in each match. Each franchise will also have one domestic icon player in their team. Players were allowed to set their base price between $20,000 and $100,000.

== Player list ==
=== Domestic players ===
Domestic players with top three base prices for the auction are listed below: Icon players will receive 15% salary more than the highest cost local player.

- Icon players ($210,000):
1. Shahriar Nafees (Barisal Burners)
2. Tamim Iqbal (Chittagong Kings)
3. Mohammad Ashraful (Dhaka Gladiators)
4. Shakib Al Hasan (Khulna Royal Bengal)
5. Mushfiqur Rahim (Duronto Rajshahi)
6. Alok Kapali (Sylhet Royals)
- Grade A ($45,000):
1. Mahmudullah
2. Abdur Razzak
3. Nasir Hossain
4. Junaid Siddique
5. Imrul Kayes
6. Mashrafe Mortaza
- Grade B ($30,000):
1. Nazimuddin
2. Raqibul Hasan
3. Elias Sunny
4. Suhrawadi Shuvo
5. Rubel Hossain
6. Shafiul Islam
7. Nazmul Hossain
8. Farhad Reza
9. Mithun Ali
10. Jahurul Islam
11. Shahadat Hossain
12. Naeem Islam

=== International players ===
International players with one of the top two base prices for the auction are listed below:

- Grade A ($100,000):
1. Dirk Nannes
2. Matt Prior
3. Scott Styris
4. Shoaib Malik
5. Abdul Razzaq
6. Azhar Mahmood
7. Shahid Afridi
8. Chaminda Vaas
9. Muttiah Muralitharan
10. Ajantha Mendis
11. Herschelle Gibbs
12. Chris Gayle
13. Kieron Pollard
14. Dwayne Bravo
15. Marlon Samuels
16. Ramnaresh Sarwan
17. Kemar Roach
18. Brendan Taylor
- Grade B ($50,000):
1. Brad Hodge
2. James Tredwell
3. Graham Onions
4. James Foster
5. Peter Trego
6. Ian Blackwell
7. Sajid Mahmood
8. Geraint Jones
9. Gary Keedy
10. Niall O'Brien
11. Lou Vincent
12. Danish Kaneria
13. Kamran Akmal
14. Rana Naved-ul-Hasan
15. Taufeeq Umar
16. Yasir Arafat
17. Raza Hasan
18. Sanath Jayasuriya
19. Thilina Kandamby
20. Andre Nel
21. Andrew Hall
22. Sulieman Benn
23. Lionel Baker
24. Dinesh Ramdin
25. Fidel Edwards
26. Dwayne Smith
27. Hamilton Masakadza
28. Elton Chigumbura

== Sold players ==
List of bought players.

Player	Team	Winning bid	Base price
Shahid Afridi	Dhaka Gladiators	$700,000	$100,000
Chris Gayle	Barisal Burners	$551,000	$100,000
Marlon Samuels	Duronto Rajshahi	$360,000	$50,000
Kieron Pollard	Dhaka Gladiators	$300,000	$100,000
Nasir Hossain	Khulna Royal Bengals	$200,000	$45,000
Shoaib Malik	Chittagong Kings	$150,000	$100,000
Dwayne Bravo	Chittagong Kings	$150,000	$100,000
Brad Hodge	Barisal Burners	$140,000	$100,000
Mahmudullah	Chittagong Kings	$110,000	$45,000
Jahurul Islam	Chittagong Kings	$110,000	$30,000
Sanath Jayasuriya	Khulna Royal Bengals	$110,000	$100,000
Muttiah Muralitharan	Chittagong Kings	$100,000	$100,000
Nasir Jamshed	Chittagong Kings	$100,000	$25,000
Abdul Razzaq	Duronto Rajshahi	$100,000	$100,000
Saeed Ajmal	Dhaka Gladiators	$100,000	$100,000
Sohail Tanvir	Sylhet Royals	$100,000	$50,000
Rana Naved-ul-Hasan	Dhaka Gladiators	$100,000	$50,000
Kamran Akmal	Sylhet Royals	$100,000	$50,000
Herschelle Gibbs	Khulna Royal Bengals	$100,000	$100,000
Naeem Islam	Sylhet Royals	$90,000	$30,000
Abdur Razzak	Khulna Royal Bengals	$85,000	$45,000
Nazimuddin	Dhaka Gladiators	$85,000	$30,000
Imran Nazir	Dhaka Gladiators	$85,000	$25,000
Andre Russell	Khulna Royal Bengals	$85,000	$50,000
Mithun Ali	Barisal Burners	$80,000	$30,000
Shuvagata Hom	Sylhet Royals	$80,000	$20,000
Yasir Arafat	Barisal Burners	$80,000	$50,000
Niall O'Brien	Khulna Royal Bengals	$80,000	$50,000
Elias Sunny	Dhaka Gladiators	$75,000	$30,000
Peter Trego	Sylhet Royals	$75,000	$50,000
Junaid Siddique	Duronto Rajshahi	$70,000	$45,000
Rubel Hossain	Sylhet Royals	$70,000	$30,000
Mohammad Sami	Duronto Rajshahi	$70,000	$25,000
Shafiul Islam	Khulna Royal Bengals	$65,000	$30,000
Mosharraf Hossain	Dhaka Gladiators	$65,000	$20,000
Alauddin Babu	Barisal Burners	$65,000	$20,000
Fidel Edwards	Khulna Royal Bengals	$60,000	$50,000
Farhad Reza	Chittagong Kings	$55,000	$30,000
Enamul Haque Jr	Chittagong Kings	$55,000	$20,000
Darren Sammy	Sylhet Royals	$55,000	$50,000
Imrul Kayes	Sylhet Royals	$50,000	$45,000
Arafat Sunny	Chittagong Kings	$50,000	$20,000
Nazmul Islam Apu	Barisal Burners	$50,000	$20,000
Imran Tahir	Duronto Rajshahi	$50,000	$50,000
Brad Hogg	Sylhet Royals	$50,000	$50,000
Ahmed Shehzad	Barisal Burners	$50,000	$50,000
Stuart MacGill	Dhaka Gladiators	$50,000	$50,000
Dwayne Smith	Khulna Royal Bengals	$50,000	$50,000
Jerome Taylor	Chittagong Kings	$50,000	$50,000
Mashrafe Mortaza	Dhaka Gladiators	$45,000	$45,000
Suhrawadi Shuvo	Barisal Burners	$45,000	$30,000
Shamsur Rahman	Chittagong Kings	$45,000	$20,000
Fawad Alam	Duronto Rajshahi	$45,000	$25,000
Sabbir Rahman	Duronto Rajshahi	$40,000	$20,000
Ziaur Rahman	Chittagong Kings	$40,000	$20,000
Sanjamul Islam	Chittagong Kings	$40,000	$20,000
Hameed Hassan	Barisal Burners	$40,000	$25,000
Nazmul Hossain Milon	Khulna Royal Bengals	$35,000	$20,000
Saqlain Sajib	Duronto Rajshahi	$35,000	$20,000
Alexei Kervezee	Dhaka Gladiators	$35,000	$25,000
Nazmul Hossain	Dhaka Gladiators	$30,000	$30,000
Shahadat Hossain	Khulna Royal Bengals	$30,000	$30,000
Nadif Chowdhury	Sylhet Royals	$30,000	$20,000
Rizwan Cheema	Duronto Rajshahi	$25,000	$25,000
Frederik Klokker	Sylhet Royals	$25,000	$25,000
Jos Buttler	Khulna Royal Bengals	$25,000	$25,000
Gary Keedy	Sylhet Royals	$25,000	$25,000
Darren Stevens	Dhaka Gladiators	$25,000	$25,000
Qaiser Abbas	Duronto Rajshahi	$25,000	$25,000
Faisal Iqbal	Sylhet Royals	$25,000	$25,000
Rameez Raja	Barisal Burners	$25,000	$25,000
Kyle Coetzer	Chittagong Kings	$25,000	$25,000
Shivnarine Chanderpaul	Khulna Royal Bengals	$25,000	$25,000
Kevon Cooper	Chittagong Kings	$25,000	$25,000
Lendl Simmons	Chittagong Kings	$25,000	$25,000
Sean Ervine	Duronto Rajshahi	$25,000	$25,000
Farhad Hossain	Barisal Burners	$20,000	$20,000
Mominul Haque	Barisal Burners	$20,000	$20,000
Faisal Hossain	Chittagong Kings	$20,000	$20,000
Aftab Ahmed	Dhaka Gladiators	$20,000	$20,000
Sohag Gazi	Barisal Burners	$20,000	$20,000
Noor Hossain	Sylhet Royals	$20,000	$20,000
Asif Ahmed	Duronto Rajshahi	$20,000	$20,000
Mukhtar Ali	Duronto Rajshahi	$20,000	$20,000
Syed Rasel	Duronto Rajshahi	$20,000	$20,000
Al Amin	Barisal Burners	$20,000	$20,000
Dolar Mahmud	Khulna Royal Bengals	$20,000	$20,000
Arafat Salahuddin	Sylhet Royals	$20,000	$20,000
Dhiman Ghosh	Dhaka Gladiators	$20,000	$20,000
Anamul Haque	Dhaka Gladiators	$20,000	$20,000
Soumya Sarkar	Duronto Rajshahi	$20,000	$20,000
Maisuqur Rahman	Khulna Royal Bengals	$20,000	$20,000
Marshall Ayub	Khulna Royal Bengals	$20,000	$20,000
Tanveer Haider	Dhaka Gladiators	$20,000	$20,000
Saghir Hossain	Khulna Royal Bengals	$20,000	$20,000
Kamrul Islam Rabbi	Barisal Burners	$20,000	$20,000
Ariful Haque	Duronto Rajshahi	$20,000	$20,000
Mizanur Rahman	Duronto Rajshahi	$20,000	$20,000
Talha Jubair	Sylhet Royals	$20,000	$20,000
Nabil Samad	Sylhet Royals	$20,000	$20,000

== Unsold players ==
These players remained unsold at the auction.

1. Aaron Finch
2. Dirk Nannes
3. Graham Manou
4. Riki Wessels
5. Ryan Campbell
6. Abishek Mitra
7. Abu Jayed
8. Abul Bashar
9. Abul Hasan
10. Delwar Hossain
11. Ejaz Ahmed
12. Fazle Mahmud
13. Imtiaz Hossain
14. Jubair Ahmed
15. Kamrul Islam
16. Mahbubul Alam
17. Mahbubul Karim
18. Mehrab Hossain jnr
19. Mohammad Sharif
20. Mohammad Shahzada
21. Monir Hossain
22. Murad Khan
23. Nafees Iqbal
24. Nasir Ussin Faruque
25. Rajin Saleh
26. Rokibul Hasan
27. Rezaul Karim
28. Robiul Islam
29. Rony Talukdar
30. Shahin Hossain
31. Shakar Ahmed
32. Shuvashish Roy
33. Taijul Islam
34. Tapash Baisya
35. Tasamul Haque
36. Taskin Ahmed
37. Tushar Imran
38. Chris Schofield
39. Darren Stevens
40. Dimitri Mascarenhas
41. Graham Onions
42. Geraint Jones
43. Ian Blackwell
44. Jason Roy
45. James Hildreth
46. James Tredwell
47. Josh Cobb
48. Matt Prior
49. Sajid Mahmood
50. Scott Borthwick
51. Tom Maynard
52. Irfan Ahmed
53. Thomas Odoyo
54. Gerrie Snyman
55. Andre Adams
56. Bruce Kruger
57. Hamish Marshall
58. Lou Vincent
59. Scott Styris
60. Adnan Akmal
61. Azhar Mahmood
62. Danish Kaneria
63. Taufeeq Umar
64. Yasir Hamid
65. Andre Nel
66. Andrew Hall
67. Claude Henderson
68. Johann Myburgh
69. Ajantha Mendis
70. Chamara Silva
71. Chaminda Vaas
72. Dilhara Fernando
73. Farveez Maharoof
74. Jehan Mubarak
75. Kaushalya Weeraratne
76. Nuwan Zoysa
77. Thilina Kandamby
78. Simon Jones
79. Dinesh Ramdin
80. Kemar Roach
81. Lionel Baker
82. Nikita Miller
83. Ramnaresh Sarwan
84. Sulieman Benn
85. Tino Best
86. Hamilton Masakadza
87. Elton Chigumbura
88. Brendan Taylor

== Post-draft signings ==
Many franchises signed players after draft as replacements for contracted players who were not available to play due to injuries and national commitments. Under BPL rules, the replacements had to be chosen from the pool of players who went unsold in the January auction, and could not be paid more than the players they are replacing, though they can be paid less.

Signed player	Replaced player	Team	Cost	Reason for replacement
Kabir Ali	Shane Harwood	Barisal Burners	$20,000	Injury
Jason Roy	Shoaib Malik	Chittagong Kings	$50,000	Pakistan call up
Brendan Taylor	Lendl Simmons	Chittagong Kings	$100,000	Injury
Azhar Mahmood	Stuart MacGill	Dhaka Gladiators	$100,000	Personal issues
Andre Adams	Fidel Edwards	Khulna Royal Bengal	$50,000	Personal issue
Scott Styris	Darren Sammy	Sylhet Royals	$100,000	Local league
Mohammad Hafeez	Jos Buttler	Khulna Royal Bengal	$50,000	National commitments

== See also ==
- 2012 Bangladesh Premier League
