= Alisha Pradhan =

Bangladeshi Actress

- আলিশা প্রধান
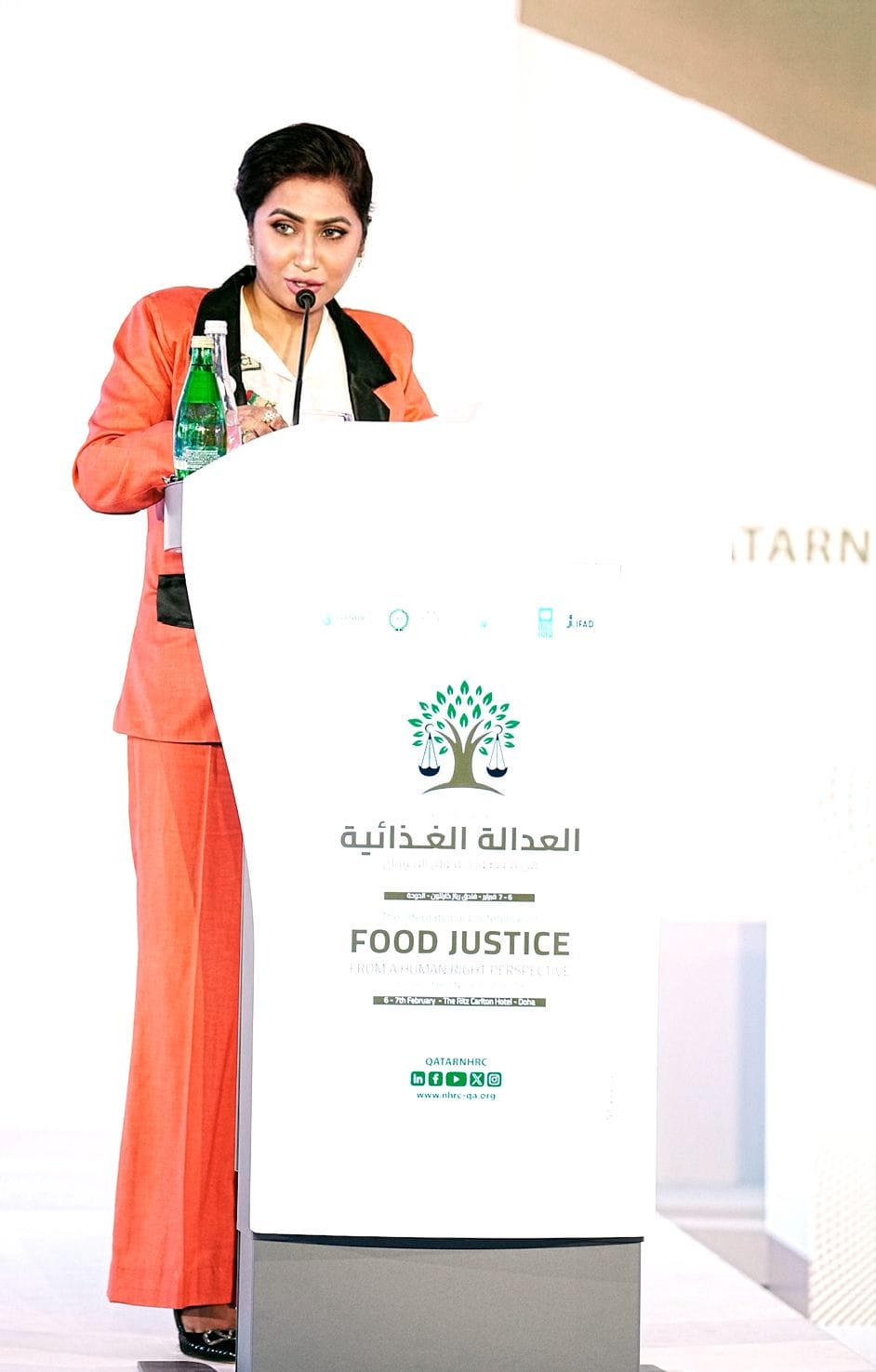
- Alisha Pradhan at the Qatar Food Justice Conference, co-hosted by NHRC, UN, UNFPA, and the World Bank, 2023.
- Born: 1993 or 1994 (age 31–32)
- Occupations: Social Entrepreneur, Media Personality, Businesswoman, Cultural Curator, & Former Film Actor
- Years active: 2008–present
- Title: Founding CEO of HerNet TV (2018–present) Secretary General of HerNet Foundation (2018–present), Chief Curator of HerNet Fine Arts (2024–present), and Founding Managing Director of Ashben Tech Ltd (2017–present)
- Website: www.thealishapradhan.com

Alisha Pradhan (pronounced [əˈliːʃa ˈprɑːdʱaːn]; born 22 February 1994) is a Bangladeshi actor, social entrepreneur, media personality, and businesswoman. She is the founding CEO of HerNet TV, secretary-general of HerNet Foundation, and Chief Curator of HerNet Fine Arts Pradhan has been working for the United Nations Sustainable Development Goals (SDGs), particularly on Gender equality, Youth empowerment, and fine arts and cultural diplomacy. She is the first Bangladeshi woman to speak at an international TEDx stage.

Alisha is also a former Bangladeshi film actress, television Show moderator and film Investor. She rose to prominence as a teenager on television. She later starred in several films, most notably with Emon in director Chashi Nazrul Islam's final two pictures, Antaranga and Bhul Jodi Hoy. Pradhan retired from acting in 2016.

Alisha regularly writes for leading Bangladeshi newspapers.

== Early life ==
Alisha Pradhan was born to Monir and Hosna Pradhan, both businesspeople. She is the second of three children, born between older sister Faiza and younger brother Ryan. She grew up in Dhaka, Bangladesh. From age 8, she studied classical dance at Bulbul Academy for Fine Arts. Later she learned Western and Latin dance and hip hop.

In 2008, at age 14, Pradhan began her show business career by modeling in a television commercial for Cova chocolate bars. She returned to the form two years later in an advertisement for Bangladeshi soft drink Uro Cola with actor Riaz, and did a second commercial for the beverage with Emon in 2012.

While still in school, she appeared in more than 30 dramas and serials on the small screen, including NTV's Dakhinayaner Din, Fazlur Rahman's Swapnochura, Ferdous Hasan Rana's Dahan, and Mostofa Sarwar Farooki's First Date. In 2011, she performed an item number for a film by director Raffael Ahsan, then titled 69 Patla Khan Lane. Legal objections by the owner of that address delayed the film, and it would not be released until December 2015, under the new title Noy Choy.

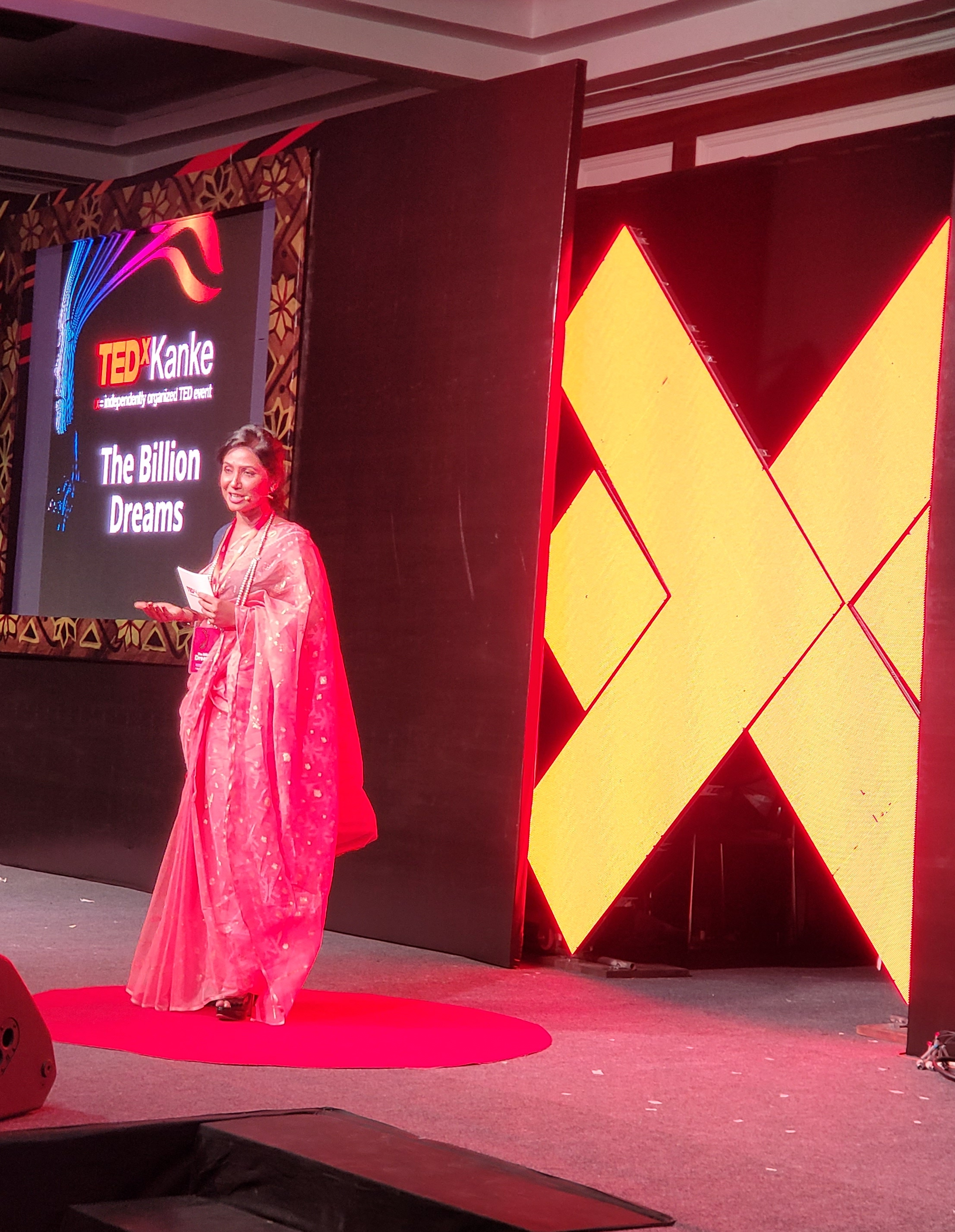
Alisha Pradhan as the first Bangladeshi woman to speak at an international TEDx stage, TEDx Kanke 2022, featuring global entrepreneurs, government representatives, and social leaders

She completed her A-levels in mid-2012.

== Career ==
Pradhan made a guest appearance in the film Eito Bhalobasha, which was released in early 2013. Meanwhile, she became a presenter for broadcasts of the 2013 Bangladesh Premier League (BPL) cricket season.

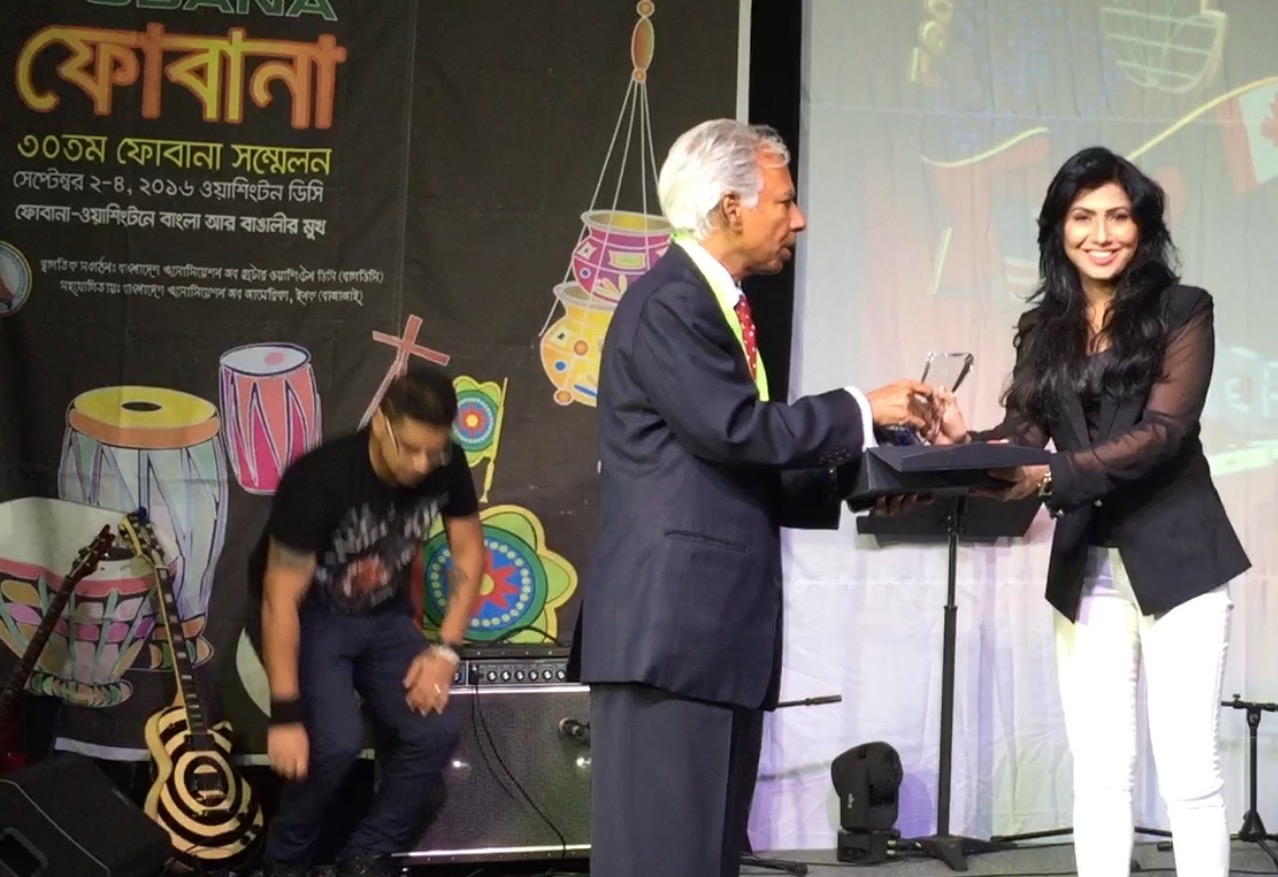
Alisha Pradhan receiving the Debut Best Actress Award at the FOBANA Convention in the USA (2016), for her debut movie "Antaranga"

Director Chashi Nazrul Islam saw her work as a presenter for the BPL and invited her to co-star with Emon in his film Bhul Jodi Hoy. Shooting took place in May 2013. While it was in post-production, she signed a four-film contract with Carnival Motion Pictures, a new production company directed by her mother. Antaranga, the first film under their banner, was again with Emon and under Islam's direction. In it she played a double role, Tamanna, a conventional Bangladeshi character dependent on her family in a patriarchal society, and Banya, a more independent, rebellious character. Filming began in December 2013 at the Bangladesh Film Development Corporation. Islam died without completing the picture. Finishing it fell to his assistant, Tarek Shikdar. It was edited by Pradhan's sister Faiza, who had studied film in India.

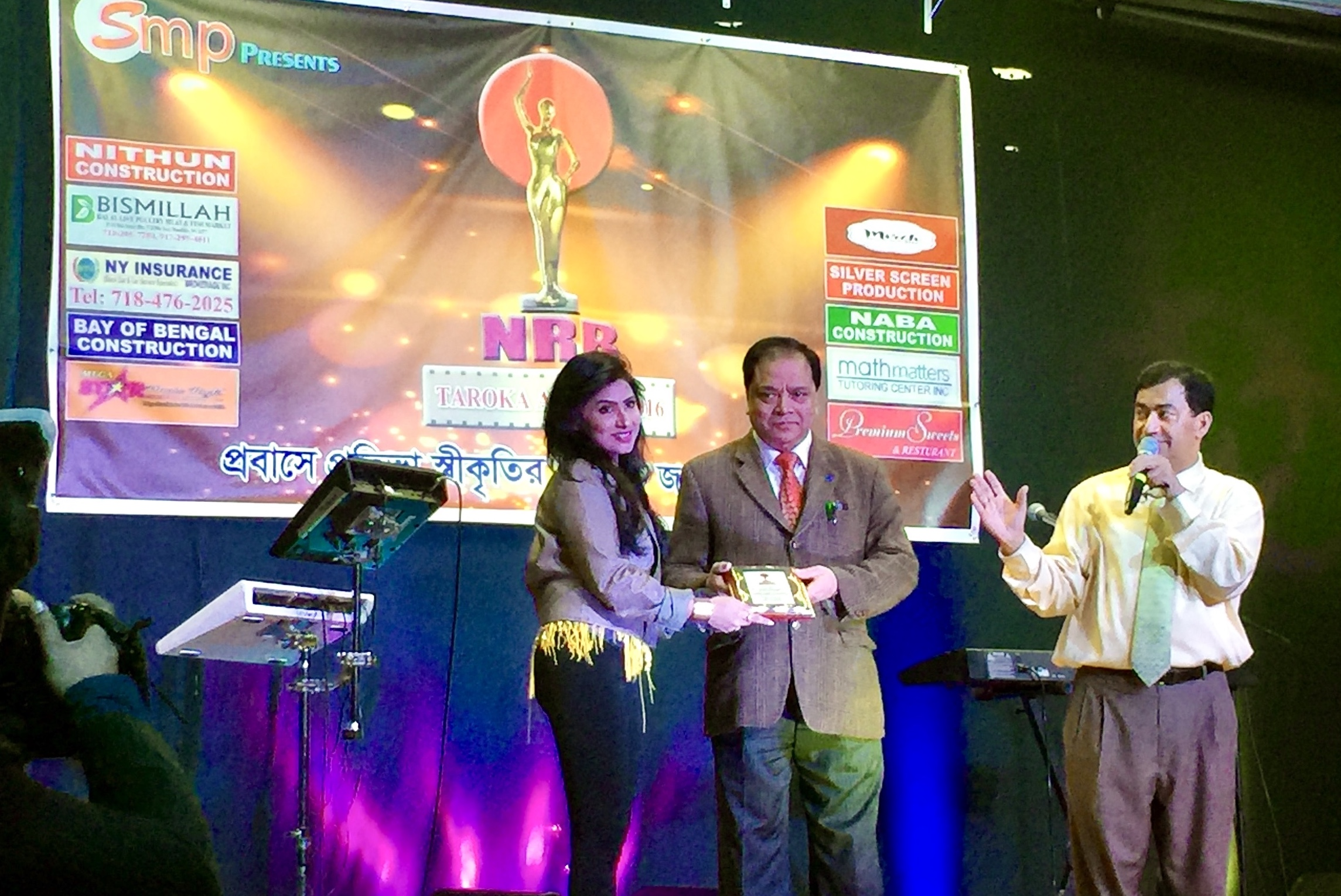
Alisha Pradhan receiving the NRB USA Debut Best Actress Award (2016), at New York for her debut movie "Antaranga"

Shooting of Pradhan's third film, Ojante Bhalobasha, directed by A J Rana, began in January 2014. In it she played the role of Kajol, "a simple middle class female". In March 2014, with several pictures in the can, but none yet released, filming began on the second Carnival Motion Pictures property, Zakir Hossain Raju's Premer Kajal. She played opposite Shipon in it. As of 2021, it is yet to be released.

Antaranga hit cinemas in November 2015, making it Pradhan's debut film in a lead role. Bhul Jodi Hoy, though filmed earlier, didn't premiere until January 2016. Antaranga was not very successful at the box office, but after its release director Shahin Sumon signed Pradhan to star in his film Probashi Don opposite Symon Sadik. The intention was to shoot most of the film abroad, starting in early 2016, but that plan became snarled in visa complications. As of November 2017, it was still in pre-production.

Ojante Bhalobasha was released in May 2016. The production house, Surjo Chalachitra, described it as a flop. Director Rana said he had hoped to at least break even, "But in hindsight, I was thinking the impossible". Pradhan announced in December 2017 that she was retiring from acting.

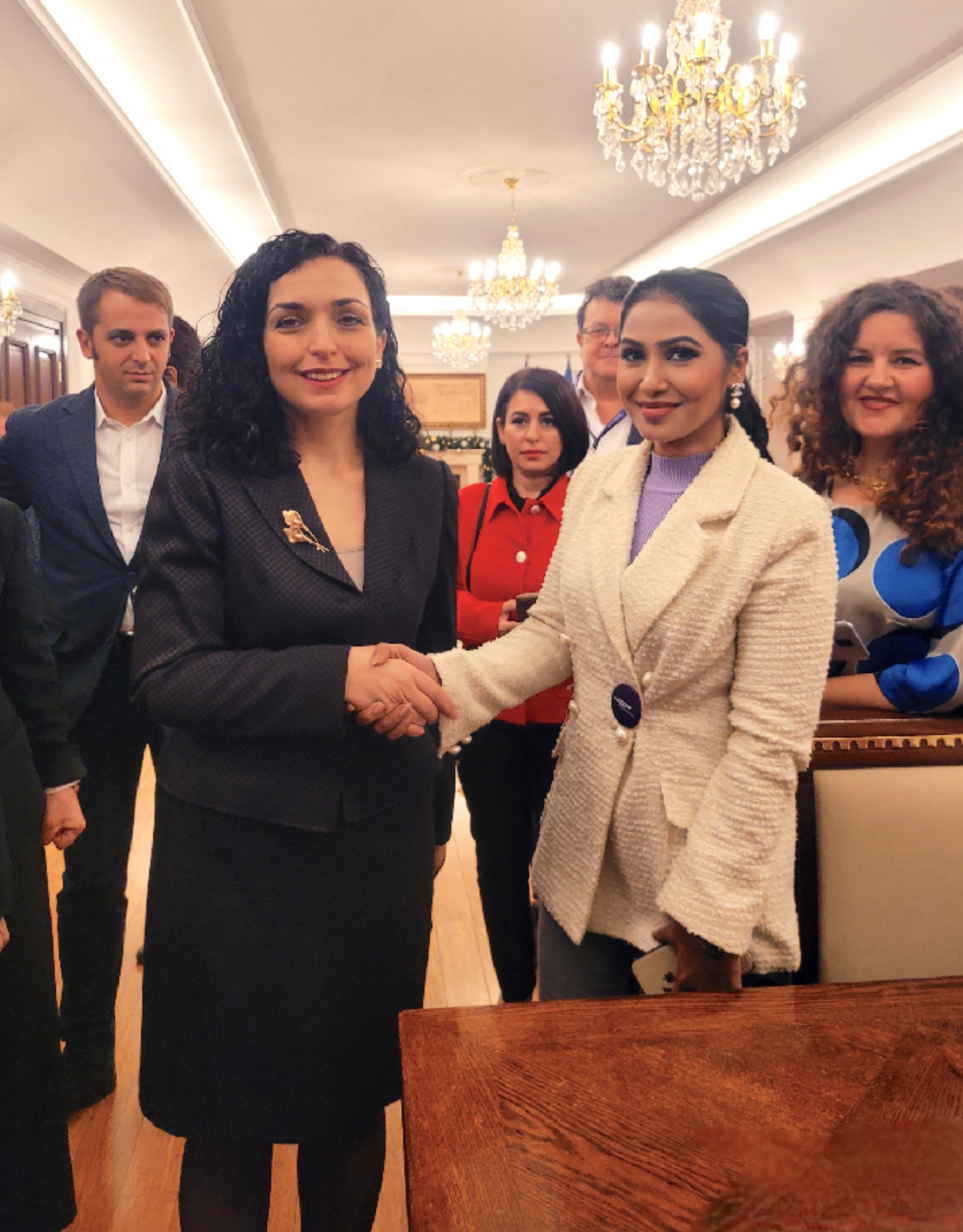
Alisha Pradhan with the President of Kosovo, Vjosa Osmani Sadriu during the Global Congress on Disabilities and Human Rights, where she served as a keynote speaker and delegate.

=== Beyond acting ===
As of 2018, Pradhan is general secretary of Bangladesh Heritage Crafts Foundation, a nonprofit organization that aims to boost the traditional crafts of Bangladesh, such as jamdani and other textiles, shital pati woven mats, and pottery.

In July 2019, Pradhan became managing director of a new internet-based television channel, HerNet TV, focused on women's wellbeing. Her mother is the chairman of the company.

== Filmography ==
=== Films ===
†	Denotes films that have not yet been released

Year	Title	Role	Ref.
2013	Eito Bhalobasha		
2015	Antaranga	Tamanna/Banya	
2015	Noy Choy	Item girl	
2016	Bhul Jodi Hoy		
2016	Ojante Bhalobasha	Kajal	
TBA †	Premer Kajol	TBA	

== See also ==
- Cinema of Bangladesh
