= Sitalpati, Sankhuwasabha =

Sitalpati सित्तलपाटी
- Village development committee
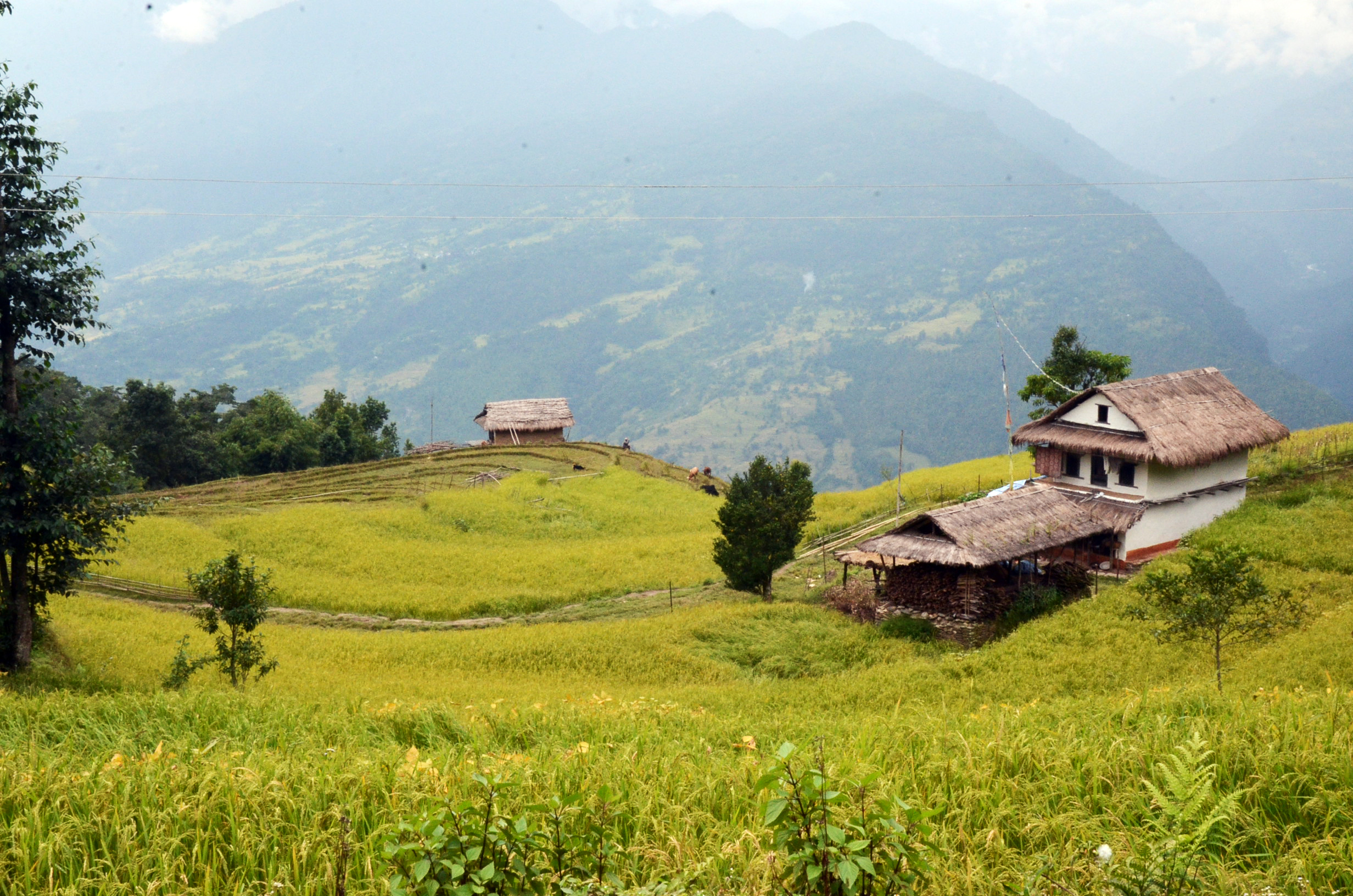

- Location in Nepal
- Coordinates: 27.43°N 87.15°E
- Country: Nepal
- Zone: Kosi Zone
- District: Sankhuwasabha District

Population (1991)
  - Total: 4,862
- Time zone: UTC+5:45 (Nepal Time)

Sitalpati is a village development committee in Sankhuwasabha District in the Kosi Zone of north-eastern Nepal. At the time of the 1991 Nepal census it had a population of 4862 people living in 975 individual households.

== List of villages ==
- [[]]
- Heluwa
- Angla
- Pangma
- Malingtar
- Nageswori
- Koktima
- helwabeshi
- Chapabote
- chandanpur
- Simle
