= 2012–13 Bangladesh Premier League =

Cricket Tournament

2013 Bangladesh Premier League
- 2013 BPL Logo
- Dates: 18 January – 19 February 2013
- Administrator: Bangladesh Cricket Board
- Cricket format: Twenty20
- Tournament format(s): Double round-robin and playoffs
- Host: Bangladesh
- Champions: Dhaka Gladiators (2nd title)
- Runners-up: Chittagong Kings
- Participants: 7
- Matches: 46
- Player of the series: Shakib Al Hasan (Dhaka Gladiators)
- Most runs: Mushfiqur Rahim (Sylhet Royals) (440)
- Most wickets: Alfonso Thomas (Dhaka Gladiators) (20)
- Official website: BPL

The Bangladesh Premier League 2013 season, also known as BPL Season 2 or Prime Bank BPL 2013 (for sponsorship reasons), was the second season of the Bangladesh Premier League, established by the Bangladesh Cricket Board (BCB) in 2012. The tournament began on 18 January 2013 and ended on 19 February. The competition featured seven teams, with the addition of the Rangpur Riders to the six franchise teams that played the first edition of the tournament. Dhaka Gladiators became champions again by beating Chittagong Kings by 43 runs in the final.

This season did not include any Pakistan players as the Pakistan Cricket Board refused to release the 27 players sold at the auction in retaliation to Bangladesh cancelling their international tour of Pakistan over safety issues.

== Venues ==
Most of the matches were held at the Sher-e-Bangla Cricket Stadium in Dhaka. For the first time, matches were played in Khulna at the Sheikh Abu Naser Stadium. MA Aziz Stadium hosted the matches in Chittagong, instead of Zohur Ahmed Chowdhury Stadium, which hosted the tournament in the first season.

Chittagong	Dhaka	Khulna
MA Aziz Stadium	Sher-e-Bangla Cricket Stadium	Sheikh Abu Naser Stadium
Capacity: 20,000	Capacity: 26,000	Capacity: 15,000
Matches: 10	Matches: 28	Matches: 8
2012–13 Bangladesh Premier League is located in Bangladesh

== Player auction ==
The player auction was held on 20 December 2012. Changes were made this season to the players' salaries structure, including the introduction of restrictions on payment to players. This glorious Auction were host by the popular & sensational film Actress Alisha Pradhan along with other honourable BPL members. Players were divided into the following categories:

Category	Base price (USD)	Bidding price restriction (USD)
Golden	50,000	75,000
Golden (foreign)	75,000	150,000
A (local)	30,000	50,000
B (local)	20,000	30,000
C (local)	10,000	20,000
A (foreign)	50,000	75,000
B (foreign)	30,000	50,000
C (foreign)	15,000	30,000

== Teams and standings ==
Pos	Team	Pld	W	L	NR	Pts	NRR
1	Dhaka Gladiators	12	9	3	0	18	0.928
2	Sylhet Royals	12	9	3	0	18	0.081
3	Chittagong Kings	12	6	6	0	12	1.170
4	Duronto Rajshahi	12	5	7	0	10	−0.557
5	Rangpur Riders	12	5	7	0	10	−0.506
6	Barisal Burners	12	5	7	0	10	−0.040
7	Khulna Royal Bengals	12	3	9	0	6	−1.056

Source: ESPNcricinfo
- The top four teams qualified for the playoffs
- advanced to the Qualifier 1
- advanced to the Eliminator
- Duronto Rajshahi qualified in fourth place, due to their head-to-head record against Rangpur Riders and Barisal Burners.

== Fixtures ==
All times are in Bangladesh Standard Time (UTC+06:00).

=== Group stage ===
==== Phase 1 ====
18 January
14:00
Scorecard

Dhaka Gladiators; 204/4 (20 overs)	v	Khulna Royal Bengals; 142/8 (20 overs)
Owais Shah 84 (48); Dolar Mahmud 3/40 (4 overs)		Riki Wessels 30 (23); Mosharraf Hossain 4/9 (4 overs)

Dhaka won by 62 runs
Shere Bangla National Stadium, Mirpur
Umpires: Richard Illingworth (Eng) and Masudur Rahman (Ban)
Player of the match: Owais Shah (Dhaka)

- Dhaka Gladiators won the toss and elected to bat

18 January
18:00 (D/N)
Scorecard

Sylhet Royals; 175/7 (20 overs)	v	Barisal Burners; 142/9 (20 overs)
Paul Stirling 50 (29); Alok Kapali 2/20 (3 overs)		Kabir Ali 50 (21); Suhrawadi Shuvo 3/23 (4 overs)

Sylhet won by 33 runs
Shere Bangla National Stadium, Mirpur
Umpires: Anisur Rahman (Ban) and Jeremy Lloyds (Eng)
Player of the match: Paul Stirling (Sylhet)

- Barisal Burners won the toss and elected to field
- Jubair Ahmed from Barisal Burners and Bishawnath Halder from Sylhet Royals made Twenty20 debut.

19 January
14:00
Scorecard

Duronto Rajshahi; 99/9 (20 overs)	v	Chittagong Kings; 97 (19.2 overs)
Mukhtar Ali 22* (31); Mahmudullah 2/17 (3 overs)		Mahmudullah 40 (42); Abul Hasan 3/20 (4 overs)

Rajshahi won by 2 runs
Shere Bangla National Stadium, Mirpur
Umpires: Jeremy Lloyds (Eng) and Mahfuzur Rahman (Ban)
Player of the match: Sean Ervine (Rajshahi)

- Duronto Rajshahi won the toss and elected to bat

19 January
18:00 (D/N)
Scorecard

Dhaka Gladiators; 202/5 (20 overs)	v	Rangpur Riders; 167/4 (20 overs)
Mohammad Ashraful 73 (47); Nasir Hossain 1/25 (4 overs)		Nasir Hossain 80 (49); Shakib Al Hasan 2/17 (4 overs)

Dhaka won by 35 runs
Shere Bangla National Stadium, Mirpur
Umpires: Masudur Rahman (Ban) and Tanvir Ahmed (Ban)
Player of the match: Mohammad Ashraful (Dhaka)

- Dhaka Gladiators won the toss and elected to bat

20 January
14:00
Scorecard

Khulna Royal Bengals; 142/8 (20 overs)	v	Barisal Burners; 146/2 (18.2 overs)
Riki Wessels 48 (44); Shafiul Islam 1/13 (2 overs)		Brad Hodge 53 (40); Dolar Mahmud 1/22 (2 overs)

Barisal won by 8 wickets
Shere Bangla National Stadium, Mirpur
Umpires: Anisur Rahman (Ban) and Richard Illingworth (Eng)
Player of the match: Brad Hodge (Barisal)

- Khulna Royal Bengals won the toss and elected to bat

20 January
18:00 (D/N)
Scorecard

Duronto Rajshahi; 147/8 (20 overs)	v	Sylhet Royals; 150/6 (19.1 overs)
Jahurul Islam 50 (38); Elton Chigumbura 3/21 (4 overs)		Elton Chigumbura 43* (21); Naeem Islam Jr. 2/17 (4 overs)

Sylhet won by 4 wickets
Shere Bangla National Stadium, Mirpur
Umpires: Jeremy Lloyds (Eng) and Tanvir Ahmed (Ban)
Player of the match: Elton Chigumbura (Sylhet)

- Duronto Rajshahi won the toss and elected to bat

==== Phase 2 ====
22 January
14:00
Scorecard

Chittagong Kings; 132/5 (20 overs)	v	Rangpur Riders; 135/4 (19.3 overs)
Brendan Taylor 65* (51); Kevin O'Brien 1/18 (3 overs)		Shamsur Rahman 52 (45); Jacob Oram 2/21 (3.3 overs)

Rangpur won by 6 wickets
Sheikh Abu Naser Stadium, Khulna
Umpires: Anisur Rahman (Ban) and Richard Illingworth (Eng)
Player of the match: Nasir Hossain (Rangpur)

- Chittagong Kings won the toss and elected to bat

22 January
18:00 (D/N)
Scorecard

Dhaka Gladiators; 156/8 (20 overs)	v	Duronto Rajshahi; 143/3 (20 overs)
Luke Wright 51 (37); Moeen Ali 3/19 (4 overs)		Tamim Iqbal 57 (41); Shakib Al Hasan 1/18 (4 overs)

Dhaka won by 13 runs
Sheikh Abu Naser Stadium, Khulna
Umpires: Gazi Sohel (Ban) and Masudur Rahman (Ban)
Player of the match: Shakib Al Hasan (Dhaka)

- Dhaka Gladiators won the toss and elected to bat

23 January
14:00
Scorecard

Rangpur Riders; 174/4 (20 overs)	v	Barisal Burners; 167/8 (20 overs)
Shamsur Rahman 66 (40); Elias Sunny 2/21 (4 overs)		Sabbir Rahman 69 (35); Abdur Razzak 4/33 (4 overs)

Rangpur won by 7 runs
Sheikh Abu Naser Stadium, Khulna
Umpires: Richard Illingworth (Eng) and Mahfuzur Rahman (Ban)
Player of the match: Shamsur Rahman (Rangpur)

- Rangpur Riders won the toss and elected to bat

23 January
18:00 (D/N)
Scorecard

Khulna Royal Bengals; 145/7 (20 overs)	v	Sylhet Royals; 146/4 (16.2 overs)
Riki Wessels 63* (44); Nannes, Gazi 2/20 (4 overs)		Hamilton Masakadza 52 (30); Nabil Samad 2/23 (4 overs)

Sylhet won by 6 wickets
Sheikh Abu Naser Stadium, Khulna
Umpires: Anisur Rahman (Ban) and Mahfuzur Rahman (Ban)
Player of the match: Hamilton Masakadza (Sylhet)

- Khulna Royal Bengals won the toss and elected to bat

24 January
10:00
Scorecard

Chittagong Kings; 129/7 (20 overs)	v	Barisal Burners; 108/9 (20 overs)
Ravi Bopara 38 (29); Azhar Mahmood 2/22 (4 overs)		Brad Hodge 34 (25); Enamul Haque Jr 2/12 (4 overs)

Chittagong won by 21 runs
Sheikh Abu Naser Stadium, Khulna
Umpires: Richard Illingworth (Eng) and Gazi Sohel (Ban)
Player of the match: Ravi Bopara (Chittagong)

- Barisal Burners won the toss and elected to field

24 January
18:00 (D/N)
Scorecard

Khulna Royal Bengals; 197/0 (20 overs)	v	Duronto Rajshahi; 129 (18.3 overs)
Shahriar Nafees 102* (69)		Jahurul Islam 26 (23); Farhad Reza 3/22 (3 overs)

Khulna won by 68 runs
Sheikh Abu Naser Stadium, Khulna
Umpires: Anisur Rahman (Ban) and Tanvir Ahmed
Player of the match: Shahriar Nafees (Khulna)

- Duronto Rajshahi won the toss and elected to field

25 January
14:00
Scorecard

Dhaka Gladiators; 152/8 (20 overs)	v	Sylhet Royals; 157/3 (18.4 overs)
Mohammad Ashraful 38 (35); Dirk Nannes 2/ 27 (4 overs)		Mushfiqur Rahim 75* (50); Alfonso Thomas 2/27 (3 overs)

Sylhet won by 7 wickets
Sheikh Abu Naser Stadium, Khulna
Umpires: Richard Illingworth (Eng) and Mahfuzur Rahman (Ban)
Player of the match: Mushfiqur Rahim (Sylhet)

- Dhaka Gladiators won the toss and elected to bat

25 January
18:00 (D/N)
Scorecard

Khulna Royal Bengals; 150/7 (20 overs)	v	Rangpur Riders; 141/7 (20 overs)
Shahriar Nafees 53 (50); Mohammad Sharif 3/22 (4 overs)		Nasir Hossain 70* (49); Shapoor Zadran 3/21 (4 overs)

Khulna won by 9 runs
Sheikh Abu Naser Stadium, Khulna
Umpires: Mahfuzur Rahman (Ban) and Masudur Rahman (Ban)
Player of the match: Daniel Harris (Khulna)

- Khulna Royal Bengals won the toss and elected to bat

==== Phase 3 ====
28 January
14:00
Scorecard

Chittagong Kings; 172/6 (20 overs)	v	Sylhet Royals; 176/7 (19.3 overs)
Naeem Islam 72 (52); Sohag Gazi 2/21 (3.1 overs)		Mohammad Nabi 43 (26); Kevon Cooper 3/21 (4 overs)

Sylhet won by 3 wickets
MA Aziz Stadium, Chittagong
Umpires: Jeremy Lloyds (Eng) and Tanvir Ahmed (Ban)
Player of the match: Mohammad Nabi (Sylhet)

- Sylhet Royals won the toss and elected to field

28 January
18:00 (D/N)
Scorecard

Duronto Rajshahi; 213/6 (20 overs)	v	Barisal Burners; 209/7 (20 overs)
Tamim Iqbal 66 (47); Alok Kapali 3/23 (4 overs)		Azhar Mahmood 54 (28); Abul Hasan 2/43 (4 overs)

Rajshahi won by 4 runs
MA Aziz Stadium, Chittagong
Umpires: Anisur Rahman (Ban) and Gazi Sohel (Ban)
Player of the match: Charles Coventry (Rajshahi)

- Duronto Rajshahi won the toss and elected to bat

29 January
14:00
Scorecard

Dhaka Gladiators; 158/5 (20 overs)	v	Sylhet Royals; 127/8 (20 overs)
Darren Stevens 55* (35); Mominul Haque 1/19 (2 overs)		Mushfiqur Rahim 41 (37); Alfonso Thomas 2/12 (4 overs)

Dhaka won by 31 runs
MA Aziz Stadium, Chittagong
Umpires: Jeremy Lloyds (Eng) and Masudur Rahman (Ban)
Player of the match: Darren Stevens (Dhaka)

- Sylhet Royals won the toss and elected to field

29 January
18:00 (D/N)
Scorecard

Rangpur Riders; 122 (20 overs)	v	Khulna Royal Bengals; 89 (18.4 overs)
Kevin O' Brien 24* (30); Daniel Harris 3/22 (4 overs)		Asif Ahmed 19 (18); Fidel Edwards 4/11 (3.4 overs)

Rangpur won by 33 runs
MA Aziz Stadium, Chittagong
Umpires: Anisur Rahman (Ban) and Mahfuzur Rahman (Ban)
Player of the match: Fidel Edwards (Rangpur)

- Rangpur Riders won the toss and elected to bat

31 January
14:00
Scorecard

Rangpur Riders; 122 (19.3 overs)	v	Sylhet Royals; 126 (19.3 overs)
Shamsur Rahman 52 (46); Sohag Gazi 3/20 (4 overs)		Nazmul Hossain Milon 45* (29); Nasir Hossain 2/19 (4 overs)

Sylhet won by 5 wickets
MA Aziz Stadium, Chittagong
Umpires: Jeremy Lloyds (Eng) and Tanvir Ahmed (Ban)
Player of the match: Nazmul Hossain Milon (Sylhet)

- Sylhet Royals won the toss and elected to field

31 January
18:00 (D/N)
Scorecard

Barisal Burners; 182/5 (20 overs)	v	Chittagong Kings; 176/6 (20 overs)
Sabbir Rahman 40 (27); Kevon Cooper 2/27 (4 overs)		Brendan Taylor 51 (42); Elias Sunny 3/24 (4 overs)

Barisal won by 6 runs
MA Aziz Stadium, Chittagong
Umpires: Anisur Rahman (Ban) and Tanvir Ahmed (Ban)
Player of the match: Azhar Mahmood (Barisal)

- Barisal Burners won the toss and elected to bat

1 February
14:30
Scorecard

Dhaka Gladiators; 137/5 (20 overs)	v	Duronto Rajshahi; 124/9 (20 overs)
Owais Shah 43* (40); Taijul Islam 2/24 (4 overs)		Tamim Iqbal 33 (18); Alfonso Thomas 2/15 (4 overs)

Dhaka won by 13 runs
MA Aziz Stadium, Chittagong
Umpires: Jeremy Lloyds (Eng) and Gazi Sohel (Ban)
Player of the match: Alfonso Thomas (Dhaka)

- Dhaka Gladiators won the toss and elected to bat

1 February
18:30 (D/N)
Scorecard

Khulna Royal Bengals; 136/5 (20 overs)	v	Chittagong Kings; 137/2 (18 overs)
Riki Wessels 35 (32); Enamul Haque Jr. 3/28 (4 overs)		Brendan Taylor 69* (49); Sanjamul Islam 1/26 (4 overs)

Chittagong won by 8 wickets
MA Aziz Stadium, Chittagong
Umpires: Mahfuzur Rahman (Ban) and Masudur Rahman (Ban)
Player of the match: Brendan Taylor (Chittagong)

- Chittagong Kings won the toss and elected to field

2 February
14:30
Scorecard

Barisal Burners; 152/6 (20 overs)	v	Duronto Rajshahi; 153/6 (19.4 overs)
Azhar Mahmood 57 (34); Dilshan Munaweera 2/18 (4 overs)		Jahurul Islam 57 (38); Azhar Mahmood 2/20 (4 overs)

Rajshahi won by 4 wickets
MA Aziz Stadium, Chittagong
Umpires: Jeremy Lloyds (Eng) and Gazi Sohel (Ban)
Player of the match: Jahurul Islam (Rajshahi)

- Barisal Burners won the toss and elected to bat

2 February
19:30 (D/N)
Scorecard

Chittagong Kings; 142 (20 overs)	v	Dhaka Gladiators; 88/8 (20 overs)
Naeem Islam 50 (38); Alfonso Thomas 2/11 (4 overs)		Mohammad Ashraful 33 (48); Jacob Oram 2/7 (4 overs)

Chittagong won by 54 runs
MA Aziz Stadium, Chittagong
Umpires: Mahfuzur Rahman (Ban) and Masudur Rahman (Ban)
Player of the match: Naeem Islam (Chittagong)

- Dhaka Gladiators won the toss and elected to field

==== Phase 4 ====
4 February
15:30
Scorecard

Rangpur Riders; 163/3 (20 overs)	v	Duronto Rajshahi; 168/3 (19 overs)
Shamsur Rahman 68 (57); Monir Hossain 1/23 (4 overs)		Tamim Iqbal 50 (36); Kevin O'Brien 1/17 (3 overs)

Rajshahi won by 7 wickets
Shere Bangla National Stadium, Mirpur
Umpires: Enamul Haque (Ban) and Richard Illingworth (Eng)
Player of the match: Tamim Iqbal (Rajshahi)

- Rangpur Riders won the toss and elected to bat

4 February
19:30 (D/N)
Scorecard

Khulna Royal Bengals; 145/7 (20 overs)	v	Barisal Burners; 148/3 (17.5 overs)
Shahriar Nafees 66 (50); Azhar Mahmood 3/23 (4 overs)		Brad Hodge 63 (47); Samuel Badree 1/25 (4 overs)

Barisal won by 7 wickets
Shere Bangla National Stadium, Mirpur
Umpires: Jeremy Lloyds (Eng) and Gazi Sohel (Ban)
Player of the match: Azhar Mahmood (Barisal)

- Barisal Burners won the toss and elected to field

5 February
15:30
Scorecard

Sylhet Royals; 147/8 (20 overs)	v	Duronto Rajshahi; 152/5 (19.4 overs)
Mushfiqur Rahim 34 (23); Dilshan Munaweera 2/19 (4 overs)		Jahurul Islam 49* (37); Dwayne Smith 2/25 (3.4 overs)

Rajshahi won by 5 wickets
Shere Bangla National Stadium, Mirpur
Umpires: Enamul Haque (Ban) and Masudur Rahman (Ban)
Player of the match: Jahurul Islam (Rajshahi)

- Duronto Rajshahi won the toss and elected to field

5 February
19:30 (D/N)
Scorecard

Dhaka Gladiators; 217/4 (20 overs)	v	Rangpur Riders; 129 (19.5 overs)
Anamul Haque 83 (46); Murad Khan 2/29 (4 overs)		Dhiman Ghosh 36* (27); Shakib Al Hasan 3/19 (4 overs)

Dhaka won by 88 runs
Shere Bangla National Stadium, Mirpur
Umpires: Enamul Haque (Ban) and Tanvir Ahmed (Ban)
Player of the match: Anamul Haque (Dhaka)

- Rangpur Riders won the toss and elected to field

7 February
15:30
Scorecard

Chittagong Kings; 156/5 (20 overs)	v	Khulna Royal Bengals; 67 (14.2 overs)
Ryan ten Doeschate 95* (61); Shapoor Zadran 2/21 (4 overs)		Shahriar Nafees 15 (17); Kevon Cooper 4/10 (3.2 overs)

Chittagong won by 83 runs
Shere Bangla National Stadium, Mirpur
Umpires: Jeremy Lloyds (Eng) and Masudur Rahman (Ban)
Player of the match: Ryan ten Doeschate (Chittagong)

- Khulna Royal Bengals won the toss and elected to field

7 February
19:30 (D/N)
Scorecard

Rangpur Riders; 197/4 (19 overs)	v	Sylhet Royals; 198/4 (10 overs)
Shamsur Rahman 98* (50); Nazmul Hossain 2/42 (4 overs)		Mushfiqur Rahim 56 (31); Abdur Razzak 2/38 (4 overs)

Sylhet won by 6 wickets.
Shere Bangla National Stadium, Mirpur
Umpires: Enamul Haque (Ban) and Richard Illingworth (Eng)
Player of the match: Shamsur Rahman (Rangpur)

- Sylhet Royals won the toss and elected to field

8 February
15:30
Scorecard

Duronto Rajshahi; 138/9 (20 overs)	v	Khulna Royal Bengals; 140/3 (19.2 overs)
Mukhtar Ali 41* (30); Krishmar Santokie 3/18 (4 overs)		Shahriar Nafees 71 (51); Ben Edmondson 2/29 (4 overs)

Khulna won by 7 wickets
Shere Bangla National Stadium, Mirpur
Umpires: Enamul Haque (Ban) and Jeremy Lloyds (Eng)
Player of the match: Shahriar Nafees (Khulna)

- Duronto Rajshahi won the toss and elected to bat.

8 February
19:30 (D/N)
Scorecard

Chittagong Kings; 193/4 (20 overs)	v	Sylhet Royals; 74 (13.5 overs)
Naeem Islam 58 (43); Mohammad Nabi 3/27 (4 overs)		Mohammad Nabi 35 (33); Rubel Hossain 3/14 (3 overs)

Chittagong won by 119 runs
Shere Bangla National Stadium, Mirpur
Umpires: Gazi Sohel (Ban) and Richard Illingworth (Eng)
Player of the match: Brendan Taylor (Chittagong)

- Sylhet Royals won the toss and elected to field.

9 February
15:30
Scorecard

Chittagong Kings; 160/6 (20 overs)	v	Rangpur Riders; 161/5 (20 overs)
Ryan ten Doeschate 50 (32); Nasir Hossain 2/25 (4 overs)		Imrul Kayes 48 (40); Shaun Tait 2/25 (4 overs)

Rangpur won by 5 wickets
Shere Bangla National Stadium, Mirpur
Umpires: Enamul Haque (Ban) and Richard Illingworth (Eng)
Player of the match: Danza Hyatt (Rangpur)

- Rangpur Riders won the toss and elected to field.

9 February
19:30 (D/N)
Scorecard

Barisal Burners; 114/9 (20 overs)	v	Dhaka Gladiators; 115/2 (12.4 overs)
Azhar Mahmood 30 (33); Chris Liddle 2/16 (4 overs)		Shakib Al Hasan 54 (31); Shuvagata Hom 1/5 (1 over)

Dhaka won by 8 wickets
Shere Bangla National Stadium, Mirpur
Umpires: Jeremy Lloyds (Eng) and Masudur Rahman (Ban)
Player of the match: Shakib Al Hasan (Dhaka)

- Barisal Burners won the toss and elected to bat.

11 February
15:30
Scorecard

Khulna Royal Bengals; 176/6 (20 overs)	v	Dhaka Gladiators; 180/4 (19.2 overs)
Travis Birt 94* (56); Alfonso Thomas 3/34 (4 overs)		Mohammad Ashraful 103* (58); Jehan Mubarak 1/8 (1 over)

Dhaka won by 6 wickets
Shere Bangla National Stadium, Mirpur
Umpires: Gazi Sohel (Ban) and Jeremy Lloyds (Eng)
Player of the match: Mohammad Ashraful (Dhaka)

- Khulna Royal Bengals won the toss and elected to bat

11 February
19:30 (D/N)
Scorecard

Rangpur Riders; 160 (18.4 overs)	v	Duronto Rajshahi; 179/8 (20 overs)
Ziaur Rahman 36* (18); Kevin O'Brien 3/17 (3 overs)		Shamsur Rahman 51 (36); Mukhtar Ali 3/25 (4 overs)

Rangpur won by 19 runs
Shere Bangla National Stadium, Mirpur
Umpires: Enamul Haque (Ban) and Jeremy Lloyds (Eng)
Player of the match: Kevin O'Brien (Rangpur)

- Duronto Rajshahi won the toss and elected to field.

12 February
15:30
Scorecard

Sylhet Royals; 196/3 (20 overs)	v	Khulna Royal Bengals; 135/7 (20 overs)
Paul Stirling 66 (39); Krishmar Santokie 1/21 (4 overs)		Mithun Ali 60 (47); Mohammad Nabi 3/28 (4 overs)

Sylhet won by 61 runs
Shere Bangla National Stadium, Mirpur
Umpires: Jeremy Lloyds (Eng) and Tanvir Ahmed (Ban)
Player of the match: Paul Stirling (Sylhet)

- Khulna Royal Bengals won the toss and elected to field

12 February
19:30 (D/N)
Scorecard

Dhaka Gladiators; 114 (19.2 overs)	v	Barisal Burners; 117/3 (13.3 overs)
Tillakaratne Dilshan 32 (35); Azhar Mahmood 3/7 (3.2 overs)		Brad Hodge 70* (44); Shakib Al Hasan 1/18 (4 overs)

Barisal won by 7 wickets
Shere Bangla National Stadium, Mirpur
Umpires: Enamul Haque (Ban) and Richard Illingworth (Eng)
Player of the match: Brad Hodge (Barisal)

- Dhaka Gladiators won the toss and elected to bat.

13 February
15:30
Scorecard

Chittagong Kings; 193/3 (20 overs)	v	Duronto Rajshahi; 160/6 (20 overs)
Jason Roy 92* (55); Monir Hossain 1/30 (3 overs)		Simon Katich 53 (39); Rubel Hossain 2/23 (3 overs)

Chittagong won by 33 runs
Shere Bangla National Stadium, Mirpur
Umpires: Richard Illingworth (Eng) and Gazi Sohel (Ban)
Player of the match: Jason Roy (Chittagong)

- Duronto Rajshahi won the toss and elected to field

13 February
19:30 (D/N)
Scorecard

Barisal Burners; 144/9 (20 overs)	v	Sylhet Royals; 145/9 (19.4 overs)
Brad Hodge 46 (40); Mominul Haque 2/14 (3 overs)		Paul Stirling 42 (29); Hamid Hassan 3/31 (4 overs)

Sylhet won by 1 wicket
Shere Bangla National Stadium, Mirpur
Umpires: Enamul Haque (Ban) and Jeremy Lloyds (Eng)
Player of the match: Paul Stirling (Sylhet)

- Sylhet Royals won the toss and elected to field

14 February
15:30
Scorecard

Barisal Burners; 139/7 (20 overs)	v	Rangpur Riders; 113 (20 overs)
Farveez Maharoof 34* (34); Saju Datta 3/23 (4 overs)		Cameron Borgas 32 (30); Hamid Hassan 3/22 (4 overs)

Barisal won by 26 runs
Shere Bangla National Stadium, Mirpur
Umpires: Enamul Haque (Ban) and Jeremy Lloyds (Eng)
Player of the match: Hamid Hassan (Barisal)

- Barisal Burners won the toss and elected to bat.

14 February
19:30 (D/N)
Scorecard

Dhaka Gladiators; 168/6 (20 overs)	v	Chittagong Kings; 139/9 (20 overs)
Tillakaratne Dilshan 49 (38); Enamul Haque Jr. 1/23 (4 overs)		Nurul Hasan 42 (30); Tillakaratne Dilshan 2/6 (2 overs)

Dhaka won by 29 runs
Shere Bangla National Stadium, Mirpur
Umpires: Anisur Rahman (Ban) and Jeremy Lloyds (Eng)
Player of the match: Shakib Al Hasan (Dhaka)

- Chittagong Kings won the toss and elected to field

== Playoff stage ==
Semifinals
15 February — Shere Bangla National Stadium, Mirpur
Dhaka Gladiators	197/9
Sylhet Royals	193/6
16 February — Shere Bangla National Stadium, Mirpur
Chittagong Kings	108/6
Duronto Rajshahi	107/7

Preliminary final
18 February — Shere Bangla National Stadium, Mirpur
Sylhet Royals	149/7
Chittagong Kings	150/7

Final
19 February — Shere Bangla National Stadium, Mirpur
Dhaka Gladiators	172/9
Chittagong Kings	129/10

Qualifier 1

15 February
18:00
Scorecard

Dhaka Gladiators; 197/9 (20 overs)	v	Sylhet Royals; 193/6 (20 overs)
Chris Gayle 114 (51); Sajidul Islam 3/23 (4 overs)		Mushfiqur Rahim 86 (44); Mashrafe Mortaza 2/40 (4 overs)

Dhaka won by 4 runs
Shere Bangla National Stadium, Mirpur
Umpires: Enamul Haque (Ban) and Jeremy Lloyds (Eng)
Player of the match: Chris Gayle (Dhaka)

- Sylhet Royals won the toss and elected to field
- As a result of this match, Dhaka Gladiators qualified for the final and Sylhet Royals qualified for the semi-final.

Elimination

16 February
18:00 (D/N)
Scorecard

Duronto Rajshahi; 107/7 (20 overs)	v	Chittagong Kings; 108/6 (17.2 overs)
Sean Ervine 47* (48); Taskin Ahmed 4/31 (3 overs)		Ravi Bopara 34* (30); Naeem Islam Jr 2/25 (4 overs)

Chittagong won by 4 wickets
Shere Bangla National Stadium, Mirpur
Umpires: Richard Illingworth (Eng) and Anisur Rahman (Ban)
Player of the match: Taskin Ahmed (Chittagong)

- Duronto Rajshahi won the toss and elected to field
- As a result of this match, Kings qualified for the semi-final and Duronto Rajshahi were eliminated.

Qualifier 2

18 February
18:00 (D/N)
Scorecard

Sylhet Royals; 149/7 (20 overs)	v	Chittagong Kings; 150/7 (19.1 overs)
Elton Chigumbura 44 * (25); Enamul Haque Jr 2/24 (4 overs)		Ryan ten Doeschate 44* (28); Nazmul Hossain 2/9 (2 overs)

Chittagong won by 3 wickets
Shere Bangla National Stadium, Mirpur
Umpires: Enamul Haque (Ban) and Jeremy Lloyds (Eng)
Player of the match: Ryan ten Doeschate (Chittagong)

- Chittagong Kings won the toss and elected to field
- As a result of this match, Chittagong Kings qualified for the final and Sylhet Royals were eliminated.

Final

19 February
18:00 (D/N)
Scorecard

Dhaka Gladiators; 172/9 (20 overs)	v	Chittagong Kings; 129 (16.5 overs)
Anamul Haque 58 (36); Rubel Hossain 4/44 (4 overs)		Mahmudullah Riyad 44 (28); Alfonso Thomas 3/19 (2.5 overs)

Dhaka won by 43 runs
Shere Bangla National Stadium, Mirpur
Umpires: Enamul Haque (Ban) and Richard Illingworth (Eng)
Player of the match: Mosharraf Hossain (Dhaka)

- Chittagong Kings won the toss and elected to field.
- Dhaka Gladiators won the 2013 BPL as a result of this match.

== Statistics ==
=== Highest team totals ===
The following table lists the five highest team scores during this season.

Team	Total	Opponent	Ground
Dhaka Gladiators	217/4 (20 overs)	Rangpur Riders	Shere Bangla National Stadium
Duronto Rajshahi	213/6 (20 overs)	Barisal Burners	MA Aziz Stadium
Barisal Burners	209/7 (20 overs)	Duronto Rajshahi	MA Aziz Stadium
Dhaka Gladiators	204/4 (20 overs)	Khulna Royal Bengals	Shere Bangla National Stadium
Dhaka Gladiators	202/5 (20 overs)	Rangpur Riders	Shere Bangla National Stadium

=== Most runs ===
The top five highest run scorers in the season are included in this table.

Player	Team	Runs
Mushfiqur Rahim	Sylhet Royals	440
Ryan ten Doeschate	Chittagong Kings	432
Shamsur Rahman	Rangpur Riders	416
Brad Hodge	Barisal Burners	410
Shahriar Nafees	Khulna Royal Bengals	395

=== Most wickets ===
The top five highest wicket-takers in the season are included in this table.

Player	Team	Wickets
Alfonso Thomas	Dhaka Gladiators	20
Azhar Mahmood	Barisal Burners	19
Enamul Haque Jr.	Chittagong Kings	18
Mohammad Nabi	Sylhet Royals	18
Mosharraf Hossain	Dhaka Gladiators	17

== See also ==
- 2013 Bangladesh Premier League squads
- 2012–13 Bangladeshi cricket season
