= Shital Pati =

Kind of mat which feels cold

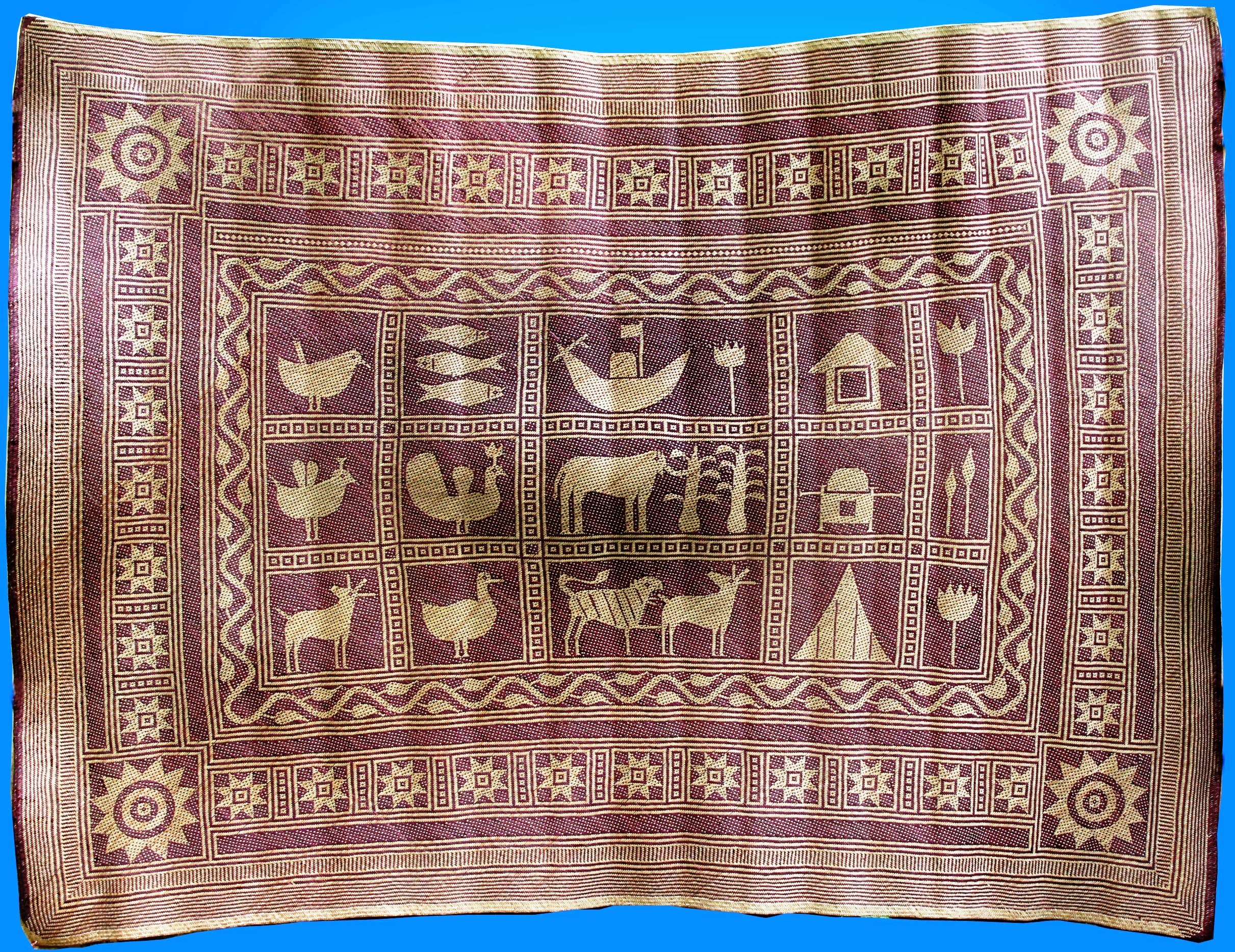
- Sheetal Pati Self Weaving
- Type: Carpeting
- Material: Murta plants fiber
- Production method: Weaving
- Production process: Handicraft
- Place of origin: Bangladesh

Traditional art of Shital Pati weaving of Sylhet
- UNESCO Intangible Cultural Heritage
- Country: Bangladesh
- Reference: 01112
- Region: Asia and the Pacific

Inscription history
- Inscription: 2017 (12th session)
- List: Representative

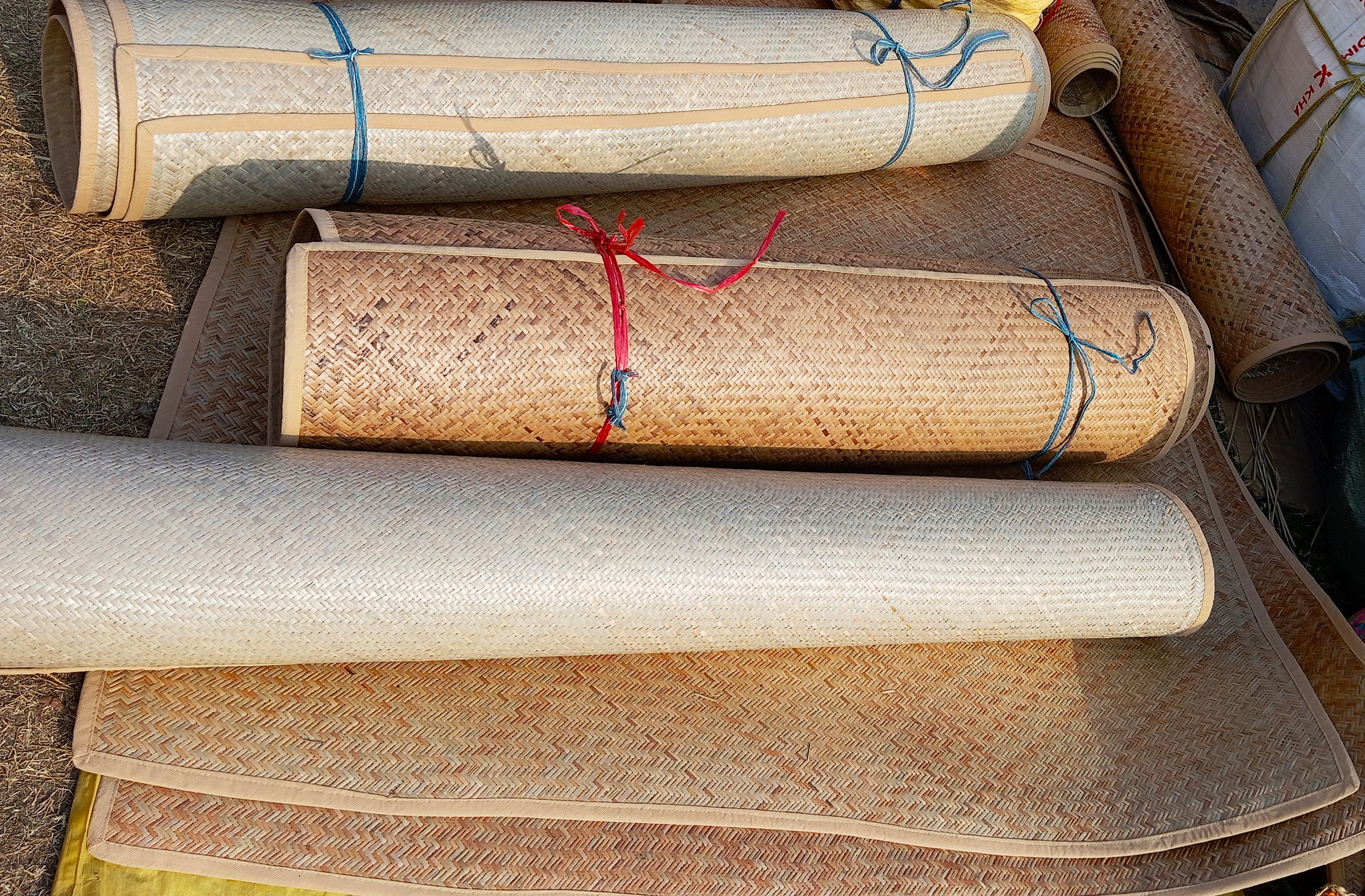
Shital Pati from Ghughumari. Cooch Behar, West Bengal

Shitalpati (Bengali: শীতল পাটি also called sital pati or sittal pati is a kind of mat which feels cold by nature. It is made from murta plants (Schumannianthus dichotomus). It is usually used in Bangladesh and the Indian state of West Bengal. Mats with decorative designs are called nakshi pati.

Sitalpati are made from cane or from murta plants, known in different places as mostak, patipata, patibet and paitara. The murta plant grows around water bodies in Sylhet, Sunamganj, Barisal, Tangail, Comilla, Noakhali, Feni and Chittagong. Nakshi pati made of murta plants is available only in Sylhet and Noakhali districts of Bangladesh. In India, Sitalpati is made in the northern Cooch Behar district of the state of West Bengal. Among the areas of Cooch Behar where Sitalpatis are woven, Sagareswar, Ghugumari and Pashnadanga are important centres.

== Recognition ==
UNESCO has recognised the Traditional Art of Shital Pati weaving of Sylhet and included it in the Representative List of the Intangible Cultural Heritage of Humanity.

== See also ==
- Nakshi kantha, decorative quilts made from cloth
