= Riki Wessels =

Australian-English cricketer

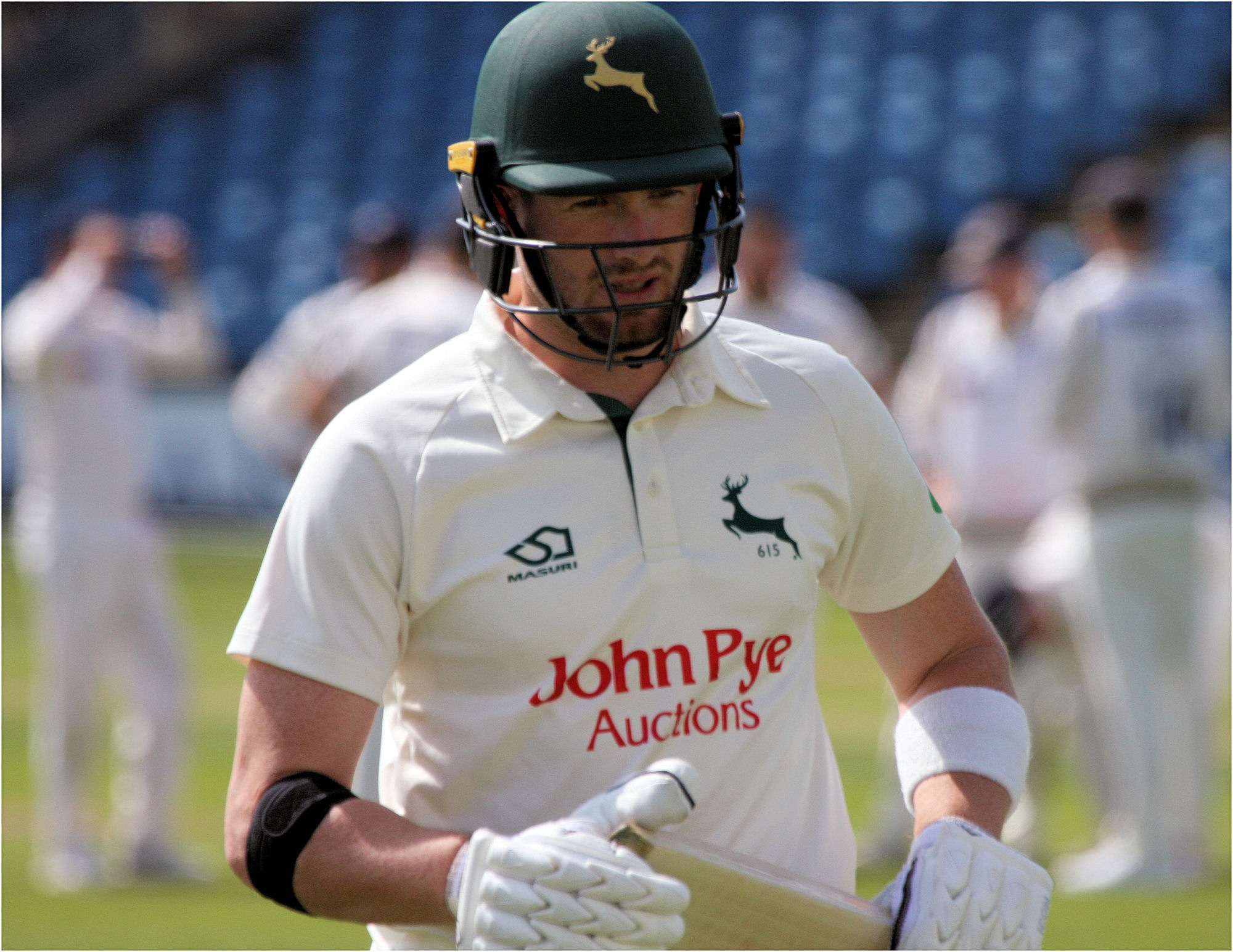
- Wessels in 2018

Personal information
- Full name: Mattheus Hendrik Wessels
- Born: 12 November 1985 (age 41); Nambour, Queensland, Australia
- Nickname: Blood
- Height: 5 ft 11 in (1.80 m)
- Batting: Right-handed
- Role: Wicket-keeper batsman
- Relatives: Kepler Wessels (father)

Domestic team information
- Years: Team
- 2004–2009: Northamptonshire (squad no. 6)
- 2004: MCC
- 2007/08: Nondescripts
- 2009/10–2011/12: Mid West Rhinos
- 2011–2018: Nottinghamshire (squad no. 9)
- 2013: Khulna Royal Bengals
- 2013: Abahani Limited
- 2014/15: Sydney Sixers
- 2016: Karachi Kings
- 2016: Khulna Titans
- 2017: Peshawar Zalmi
- 2018: Kandahar Knights
- 2019: Lahore Qalandars
- 2019–2021: Worcestershire (squad no. 99)
- FC debut: 13 July 2004 MCC v West Indians
- LA debut: 3 May 2005 Northamptonshire v Denmark

Career statistics
Competition	FC	LA	T20
Matches	224	179	237
Runs scored	11,701	4,765	5,684
Batting average	34.61	30.94	28.85
100s/50s	23/61	5/26	1/26
Top score	202*	146	110
Balls bowled	240	49	–
Wickets	3	1	–
Bowling average	43.33	48.00	–
5 wickets in innings	0	0	–
10 wickets in match	0	0	–
Best bowling	1/10	1/0	–
Catches/stumpings	339/16	121/0	96/16
- Source: ESPNcricinfo, 1 November 2021

Mattheus Hendrik "Riki" Wessels (born 12 November 1985) is an Australian-English cricketer who most recently played for Worcestershire County Cricket Club. A right-handed batsman and wicket-keeper, Wessels has played for Marylebone Cricket Club, Northamptonshire and Nottinghamshire, and also for the Mid West Rhinos in Zimbabwe and the Sydney Sixers in Australia. He is the son of former South African captain Kepler Wessels, who also played 24 Test matches for Australia.

== Early life ==
Wessels was born in Queensland, Australia, where his father was playing domestic cricket at the time. After Kepler decided to return to South Africa, Riki grew up in Port Elizabeth. Cricket was not an automatic choice for him, as he was also a keen hockey player, but at 18 he made the decision to pursue a cricket career in England.

== Cricket career ==
In 2004, Wessels joined the staff at Northamptonshire County Cricket Club where he impressed in the second eleven producing several noticeable scores. This led to him being selected for the MCC in 2004 and in the first team of Nottinghamshire for the start of the 2011 season. In 2004, he established himself as a first class player, and scored his first century at the age of 19 against Somerset. In 2007, he became eligible to play for England, which is what he wanted to do from an early age. Being a keen hockey player (playing for Northampton Lions and the University of Northampton teams) helps him to play a variety of shots including the reverse sweep for which he is well known. He is a fairly attacking player especially in one-day cricket, where he made one century to date. On 7 November 2008, Wessels signed a contract extension along with fellow Northamptonshire wicket keeper Niall O'Brien, keeping Riki at the club until 2010.

He also turned out for Nondescripts Cricket Club in Sri Lanka during the English off-season between 2008 and 2010.

Wessels signed for Nottinghamshire County Cricket Club for the 2011 season, where he plies his trade as a specialist batsman.

He was signed as a specialist batsman by the Sydney Sixers in the 2014–15 Big Bash League tournament in Australia.

After returning to Brisbane following his playing retirement, he took up umpiring. Following a successful 2024/25 season, where he officiated in the Queensland Premier Cricket grand final, as well as matches in the Women's National Cricket League and men's second XI competition, he was elevated to the Cricket Australia Contracted Umpire Panel, and made his first class debut in September 2025.
