= Asif Ahmed (Bangladeshi cricketer) =

Bangladeshi cricketer (born 1992)

Personal information
- Born: 17 December 1992 (age 33); Dhaka, Bangladesh
- Batting: Right-handed
- Bowling: Right-arm off break
- Role: Batsman

Domestic team information
- Years: Team
- 2010–: Barisal Division
- FC debut: 14 January 2010 Barisal Division v Chittagong Division
- Last FC: 19 January 2016 East Zone (Bangladesh) v North Zone (Bangladesh)
- LA debut: 23 October 2010 Barisal Division v Sylhet Division
- Last LA: 22 June 2016 Legends of Rupganj v Prime Doleshwar Sporting Club

Career statistics
Competition	FC	LA	T20
Matches	15	9	1
Runs scored	1121	185	5
Batting average	43.11	26.42	5.00
100s/50s	3/5	0/0	0/0
Top score	152	48	5
Balls bowled	609	271	16
Wickets	34.88	33.87	0
Bowling average	9	8	–
5 wickets in innings	0	0	–
10 wickets in match	0	0	–
Best bowling	4/29	3/25	–
Catches/stumpings	15/–	7/–	0/–
Medal record
Representing Bangladesh
Men's Cricket
South Asian Games
Gold medal – first place	2010 Dhaka	Team
- Source: Cricinfo

Asif Ahmed (born 17 December 1992) is a Bangladeshi first-class cricketer who plays for the Barisal Division. He made his Twenty20 debut for Chittagong Kings against Duronto Rajshahi in the 2012 Bangladesh Premier League on 10 February 2012.
